= 2010 UEFA European Under-17 Championship squads =

Below are the rosters for the 2010 UEFA European Under-17 Championship tournament in Liechtenstein. Players whose names are marked in bold went on to earn full international caps.

Players' ages as of the tournament's opening day (18 May 2010).

== Group A ==
=== France ===
Head coach: Guy Ferrier

No.	Pos.	Player	Date of birth (age)	Caps	Club
1	GK	**Alphonse Areola**	27 February 1993 (aged 17)	7	(France) Paris Saint-Germain
2	DF	**Youssouf Sabaly**	5 March 1993 (aged 17)	8	(France) Paris Saint-Germain
3	DF	Alvin Arrondel	11 November 1993 (aged 16)	6	(France) Paris Saint-Germain
4	DF	**Samuel Umtiti**	14 November 1993 (aged 16)	5	(France) Lyon
5	DF	Wesley Yamnaine	7 July 1993 (aged 16)	12	(France) Rennes
6	MF	**Paul Pogba**	15 March 1993 (aged 17)	6	(England) Manchester United
7	MF	**Abdoulaye Doucouré**	1 January 1993 (aged 17)	15	(France) Rennes
8	FW	William Le Pogam	3 March 1993 (aged 17)	7	(France) Lyon
9	FW	Yaya Sanogo	27 January 1993 (aged 17)	12	(France) Auxerre
10	FW	**Anthony Koura**	6 May 1993 (aged 17)	9	(France) Le Mans
11	MF	Dylan Deligny	5 August 1993 (aged 16)	15	(France) Lens
12	DF	**Lucas Digne**	20 July 1993 (aged 16)	11	(France) Lille
13	DF	Jérémy Obin (c)	5 March 1993 (aged 17)	7	(France) Lille
14	MF	Marco Rosenfelder	19 July 1993 (aged 16)	16	(France) Strasbourg
15	MF	Eliott Sorin	1 March 1993 (aged 17)	15	(France) Rennes
16	GK	Maxime Dupé	4 March 1993 (aged 17)	7	(France) Nantes
17	MF	Vincent Le Roux	19 January 1993 (aged 17)	5	(France) Nice
18	FW	**Billel Omrani**	2 June 1993 (aged 16)	9	(France) Marseille

=== Portugal ===
Head coach: Rui Bento

No.	Pos.	Player	Date of birth (age)	Caps	Club
1	GK	André Preto	18 April 1993 (aged 17)	12	(Portugal) Vitória de Guimarães
2	DF	Pedro Almeida	5 April 1993 (aged 17)	13	(Portugal) Benfica
3	DF	Tiago Ferreira	10 July 1993 (aged 16)	13	(Portugal) Porto
4	DF	Tobias Figueiredo	2 February 1994 (aged 16)	12	(Portugal) Sporting CP
5	DF	Rodolfo Simões	2 May 1993 (aged 17)	6	(Portugal) Sporting CP
6	MF	Paulo Jorge	18 January 1993 (aged 17)	12	(Portugal) Porto
7	FW	Ricardo Esgaio	16 May 1993 (aged 17)	14	(Portugal) Sporting CP
8	MF	**João Mário**	19 January 1993 (aged 17)	14	(Portugal) Sporting CP
9	FW	Betinho	21 July 1993 (aged 16)	9	(Portugal) Sporting CP
10	MF	Mateus Fonseca	10 May 1993 (aged 17)	14	(Portugal) Sporting CP
11	FW	Sancidino Silva	5 March 1994 (aged 16)	14	(Portugal) Benfica
12	GK	Rafael Veloso	3 November 1993 (aged 16)	2	(Portugal) Sporting CP
13	DF	Daniel Martins	20 July 1993 (aged 16)	12	(Portugal) Benfica
14	DF	André Teixeira	14 August 1993 (aged 16)	7	(Portugal) Porto
15	MF	Agostinho Cá	24 July 1993 (aged 16)	0	(Portugal) Sporting CP
16	FW	**Ivan Cavaleiro**	18 October 1993 (aged 16)	6	(Portugal) Belenenses
17	FW	**Bruma**	24 October 1994 (aged 15)	11	(Portugal) Sporting CP
18	MF	João Carlos Teixeira	18 January 1993 (aged 17)	13	(Portugal) Sporting CP

=== Spain ===
Head coach: Ginés Meléndez

No.	Pos.	Player	Date of birth (age)	Caps	Club
1	GK	Alfonso Herrero	21 April 1994 (aged 16)	2	(Spain) Real Madrid
2	DF	Edu Campabadal	26 January 1993 (aged 17)	8	(Spain) Barcelona
3	DF	Uxío Marcos	11 January 1993 (aged 17)	0	(Spain) Deportivo La Coruña
4	DF	**Jonás Ramalho** (captain)	10 June 1993 (aged 16)	8	(Spain) Athletic Bilbao
5	DF	Víctor Álvarez	14 March 1993 (aged 17)	3	(Spain) Espanyol
6	MF	Sergi Darder	22 December 1993 (aged 16)	3	(Spain) Espanyol
7	FW	Jesé	26 February 1993 (aged 17)	2	(Spain) Real Madrid
8	MF	**José Campaña**	31 May 1993 (aged 16)	7	(Spain) Sevilla
9	FW	**Paco Alcácer**	30 August 1993 (aged 16)	8	(Spain) Valencia
10	MF	**Saúl**	21 November 1994 (aged 15)	0	(Spain) Atlético Madrid
11	MF	**Juan Bernat**	1 March 1993 (aged 17)	8	(Spain) Valencia
12	DF	Israel Puerto	15 June 1993 (aged 16)	1	(Spain) Sevilla
13	GK	Adrián Ortolá	20 August 1993 (aged 16)	3	(Spain) Roda
14	DF	Cristian Galas	15 February 1993 (aged 17)	7	(Spain) Villarreal
15	MF	Pablo Hervías	8 March 1993 (aged 17)	0	(Spain) Real Sociedad
16	MF	Aitor Castro	17 April 1993 (aged 17)	0	(Spain) Real Sociedad
17	FW	**Gerard Deulofeu**	13 March 1994 (aged 16)	6	(Spain) Barcelona
18	FW	Jorge Ortí	28 April 1993 (aged 17)	4	(Spain) Zaragoza

=== Switzerland ===
Head coach: Heinz Moser

No.	Pos.	Player	Date of birth (age)	Caps	Club
1	GK	Yanick Brecher	25 May 1993 (aged 16)	4	(Switzerland) Zürich
2	DF	Fabio Schmid	28 June 1993 (aged 16)	9	(Switzerland) Zürich
3	DF	Mattia Desole	10 May 1993 (aged 17)	9	(Italy) Inter Milan
4	DF	Aleksandar Žarković	23 February 1993 (aged 17)	7	(Switzerland) Basel
5	DF	**Arlind Ajeti**	25 September 1993 (aged 16)	5	(Switzerland) Basel
6	MF	Alessandro Martinelli	30 May 1993 (aged 16)	9	(Switzerland) Grasshopper
7	MF	Numa Lavanchy	25 August 1993 (aged 16)	10	(Switzerland) Lausanne
8	MF	Nico Zwimpfer	6 July 1993 (aged 16)	12	(Switzerland) Basel
9	FW	Gaëtan Karlen	7 June 1993 (aged 16)	4	(Switzerland) Sion
10	MF	Mike Kleiber	4 February 1993 (aged 17)	9	(Switzerland) Zürich
11	FW	Stjepan Vuleta	29 October 1993 (aged 16)	8	(Switzerland) Basel
12	GK	Andreas Hirzel	25 March 1993 (aged 17)	7	(Switzerland) Aarau
13	FW	Endoğan Adili	3 August 1994 (aged 15)	0	(Switzerland) Grasshopper
14	DF	Ivo Zangger	2 February 1993 (aged 17)	6	(Switzerland) Young Boys
15	MF	Cristian Miani	28 July 1993 (aged 16)	5	(Switzerland) Young Boys
16	MF	Joël Geissmann	3 March 1993 (aged 17)	9	(Switzerland) Aarau
17	MF	Samir Naïli	17 April 1993 (aged 17)	7	(Switzerland) Young Boys
18	MF	Davide Riva	4 September 1993 (aged 16)	3	(Italy) Empoli

== Group B ==
=== Czech Republic ===
Head coach: Štol Jiří

No.	Pos.	Player	Date of birth (age)	Caps	Club
1	GK	Jiří Adamuška	2 November 1993 (aged 16)	9	(Czech Republic) Tescoma Zlín
2	DF	**Tomáš Kalas**	15 May 1993 (aged 17)	9	(Czech Republic) Sigma Olomouc
3	MF	Jan Mižič	11 January 1993 (aged 17)	11	(Czech Republic) Bohemians 1905
4	MF	Martin Štancl	2 March 1993 (aged 17)	2	(Czech Republic) Vysočina Jihlava
5	DF	Jakub Plšek	13 December 1993 (aged 16)	0	(Czech Republic) Sigma Olomouc
6	MF	Jan Toms	2 August 1993 (aged 16)	14	(Czech Republic) Sparta Prague
7	MF	Marek Krátký	8 June 1993 (aged 16)	14	(Czech Republic) Teplice
8	FW	Martin Hurka	20 April 1993 (aged 17)	14	(Czech Republic) Slavia Prague
9	FW	Dominik Mandula	24 July 1993 (aged 16)	8	(Czech Republic) Viktoria Plzeň
10	FW	Adam Kučera	25 February 1993 (aged 17)	0	(Czech Republic) Sparta Prague
11	MF	Tomáš Česlák	8 June 1993 (aged 16)	14	(Czech Republic) Teplice
12	MF	Matěj Hybš	3 January 1993 (aged 17)	11	(Czech Republic) Sparta Prague
13	MF	Martin Krameš	17 August 1993 (aged 16)	11	(Czech Republic) Příbram
14	DF	Filip Twardzik	10 February 1993 (aged 17)	11	(Scotland) Celtic
15	MF	Roman Haša	15 February 1993 (aged 17)	6	(Czech Republic) Slovácko
16	GK	Vlastimil Veselý	6 May 1993 (aged 17)	13	(Czech Republic) Brno
17	FW	Robert Mariotti	16 March 1993 (aged 17)	8	(Czech Republic) Sparta Prague
18	FW	Patrik Twardzik	10 February 1993 (aged 17)	11	(Scotland) Celtic

=== England ===
Head coach: John Peacock

No.	Pos.	Player	Date of birth (age)	Caps	Club
1	GK	**Sam Johnstone**	24 March 1993 (aged 17)	13	(England) Manchester United
2	MF	Bruno Pilatos	3 March 1993 (aged 17)	15	(England) Middlesbrough
3	DF	Luke Garbutt	21 May 1993 (aged 16)	20	(England) Everton
4	MF	**Conor Coady**	25 February 1993 (aged 17)	13	(England) Liverpool
5	DF	**Nathaniel Chalobah**	15 December 1994 (aged 15)	13	(England) Chelsea
6	DF	Andre Wisdom	9 May 1993 (aged 17)	10	(England) Liverpool
7	FW	**Will Keane**	11 January 1993 (aged 17)	11	(England) Manchester United
8	MF	George Thorne	4 January 1993 (aged 17)	14	(England) West Bromwich Albion
9	FW	**Benik Afobe**	12 February 1993 (aged 17)	19	(England) Arsenal
10	FW	**Saido Berahino**	4 August 1993 (aged 16)	1	(England) West Bromwich Albion
11	FW	Robert Hall	20 October 1993 (aged 16)	11	(England) West Ham United
12	DF	Ben Gibson	15 January 1993 (aged 17)	3	(England) Middlesbrough
13	GK	**Jack Butland**	10 March 1993 (aged 17)	6	(England) Birmingham City
14	DF	Tom Thorpe	13 January 1993 (aged 17)	4	(England) Manchester United
15	MF	Josh McEachran	1 March 1993 (aged 17)	8	(England) Chelsea
16	MF	**Ross Barkley**	5 December 1993 (aged 16)	2	(England) Everton
17	FW	Connor Wickham	31 March 1993 (aged 17)	9	(England) Ipswich Town
18	MF	Luke Williams	11 June 1993 (aged 16)	2	(England) Middlesbrough

=== Greece ===
Head coach: Leonidas Vokolos

No.	Pos.	Player	Date of birth (age)	Caps	Club
1	GK	**Stefanos Kapino**	18 March 1994 (aged 16)	6	(Greece) Panathinaikos
2	DF	Vasilios Karagounis	18 January 1994 (aged 16)	4	(Greece) Atromitos
3	DF	**Charalampos Lykogiannis**	22 October 1993 (aged 16)	6	(Greece) Olympiacos
4	DF	Konstantinos Rougalas	13 October 1993 (aged 16)	7	(Greece) Olympiacos
5	DF	Mavroudis Bougaidis	1 June 1993 (aged 16)	6	(Greece) Aris
6	DF	Ioannis Polychronakis	15 March 1993 (aged 17)	6	(Greece) Olympiacos
7	MF	**Giannis Gianniotas**	29 April 1993 (aged 17)	2	(Greece) Aris
8	MF	Spyros Fourlanos	19 November 1993 (aged 16)	6	(Greece) Panathinaikos
9	FW	**Dimitrios Diamantakos**	5 March 1993 (aged 17)	9	(Greece) Olympiacos
10	MF	Christos Arianoutsos	29 May 1993 (aged 16)	5	(Greece) Olympiacos
11	MF	Nikos Kousidis	3 January 1993 (aged 17)	5	(Greece) Panathinaikos
12	GK	Makis Giannikoglou	25 March 1993 (aged 17)	0	(Greece) Skoda Xanthi
14	DF	Nikos Marinakis	12 September 1993 (aged 16)	2	(Greece) Panathinaikos
15	FW	Christos Provatidis	19 February 1993 (aged 17)	5	(Greece) PAOK
16	FW	Fotis Kaimakamoudis	2 January 1993 (aged 17)	3	(Greece) AEK Athens
17	MF	**Charalampos Mavrias**	21 February 1994 (aged 16)	5	(Greece) Panathinaikos
18	MF	Giorgos Katidis	12 February 1993 (aged 17)	5	(Greece) Aris
19	MF	**Kostas Stafylidis**	2 December 1993 (aged 16)	3	(Greece) PAOK

=== Turkey ===
Head coach: Abdullah Ercan

No.	Pos.	Player	Date of birth (age)	Caps	Club
1	GK	Muhammed Uysal	1 January 1994 (aged 16)	6	(Turkey) Galatasaray
2	DF	Erhan Kartal	1 March 1993 (aged 17)	6	(Turkey) Denizlispor
3	DF	Onur Yavuz	14 May 1993 (aged 17)	3	(Turkey) Gençlerbirliği
4	DF	Metin Aydın	6 March 1993 (aged 17)	3	(Turkey) Ankaragücü
5	DF	Oğuzhan Azğar	14 July 1993 (aged 16)	6	(Turkey) Samsunspor
6	MF	Servan Taştan	20 May 1993 (aged 16)	3	(France) Metz
7	MF	Taşkın Çalış	25 July 1993 (aged 16)	?	(Germany) Borussia Mönchengladbach
8	MF	İlker Sayan	4 May 1993 (aged 17)	6	(Turkey) Dardanel Spor
9	FW	Artun Akçakın	6 May 1993 (aged 17)	6	(Turkey) Gençlerbirliği
10	MF	Çağrı Tekin	16 June 1993 (aged 16)	4	(Turkey) Gençlerbirliği
11	FW	Okan Derici	16 April 1993 (aged 17)	3	(Germany) Eintracht Frankfurt
12	GK	Aykut Özer	1 January 1993 (aged 17)	0	(Germany) Eintracht Frankfurt
13	MF	Rıdvan Armut	29 September 1993 (aged 16)	2	(Germany) Rot-Weiss Essen
14	MF	**Okay Yokuşlu**	9 March 1994 (aged 16)	5	(Turkey) Altay
15	MF	Bilal Gülden	1 May 1993 (aged 17)	5	(Turkey) Ankaraspor
16	FW	Beykan Şimşek	1 January 1995 (aged 15)	0	(Turkey) Fenerbahçe
17	MF	Recep Niyaz	1 January 1995 (aged 15)	0	(Turkey) Denizlispor
18	DF	Kani Özdil	20 January 1993 (aged 17)	0	(Germany) VfL Wolfsburg
