= 2010 UEFA European Under-17 Championship qualifying round =

Football tournament qualification stage

2010 UEFA European Under-17 Football Championship (qualifying round) was the first round of qualifications for the Final Tournament of UEFA U-17 Championship 2010. Of the 52 countries contesting in the qualifying round, 28 would advance to the elite round.

The qualifying round was played between 5 September and 31 October 2009. The 52 teams were divided into 13 groups of four teams, with each group being contested as a mini-tournament, hosted by one of the group's teams. After all matches were played, the 13 group winners and 13 group runners-up automatically advanced to the Elite round. If two or more teams were tied in points, a tie-breaking procedure applied according to the following criteria:

1. Higher number of points obtained in the group matches played among the teams in question;
2. Superior goal difference resulting from the group matches played among the teams in question;
3. Higher number of goals scored in the group matches played among the teams in question;
4. If, after having applied criteria 1. to 3., two teams still had an equal ranking, criteria 1. to 3. was reapplied to determine the ranking of the two teams. If this procedure did not lead to a decision, criteria 5. and 6. applied.
5. Results of all group matches:
  1. Superior goal difference.
  2. Higher number of goals scored.
6. Drawing of lots.

Alongside the 26 winner and runner-up teams, the two best third-placed teams also qualified. These were determined after considering only their results against their group's top two teams, and applying the following criteria in this order:

1. Higher number of points obtained in these matches;
2. Superior goal difference from these matches;
3. Higher number of goals scored in these matches;
4. Fair-play conduct of the teams in all group matches in the qualifying round;
5. Drawing of lots.

The host team of each group's mini-tournament are indicated in italics in the tables below.

== Stages ==
=== Group 1 ===
Team	Pld	W	D	L	GF	GA	GD	Pts
England	3	3	0	0	11	2	+9	9
Serbia	3	1	1	1	1	1	0	4
Azerbaijan	3	1	1	1	3	5	−2	4
Kazakhstan	3	0	0	3	3	10	−7	0

26 October 2009
09:00 CET

England	6–2	Kazakhstan
Garbutt 2'; Keane 15'; Afobe 26', 75'; Hall 66', 73'	Report	31' Kuat; 33' Utrobin

Ismet Qaibov, Baku
Referee: (North Macedonia) Goran Spirkoski

26 October 2009
12:00 CET

Serbia	0–0	Azerbaijan
	Report

Tofikh Bakhramov-Republic stadium, Baku
Referee: (Cyprus) Christos Elia

28 October 2009
09:00 CET

Serbia	1–0	Kazakhstan
Rudić 51'	Report

Tofikh Ismayilov, Baku
Referee: (Cyprus) Christos Elia

28 October 2009
12:00 CET

Azerbaijan	0–4	England
	Report	18', 30' (pen.), 39' Wickham; 67' Afobe

Tofikh Bakhramov-Republic stadium, Baku
Referee: (Czech Republic) Jan Jílek

31 October 2009
12:00 CET

England	1–0	Serbia
Afobe 58'	Report

Ismet Qaibov, Baku
Referee: (Czech Republic) Jan Jílek

31 October 2009
12:00 CET

Kazakhstan	1–3	Azerbaijan
Utrobin 49'	Report	46' Tagizade; 73' (pen.) Ahmadov; 80' Abatsiyev

Tofikh Bakhramov-Republic stadium, Baku
Referee: (North Macedonia) Goran Spirkoski

=== Group 2 ===
Team	Pld	W	D	L	GF	GA	GD	Pts
Spain	3	3	0	0	19	2	+17	9
Romania	3	2	0	1	6	4	+2	6
Lithuania	3	1	0	2	4	12	−8	3
Faroe Islands	3	0	0	3	2	13	−11	0

16 October 2009
10:00 CET

Romania	1–0	Lithuania
Musca 1'	Report

Town Stadium, Buftea
Referee: (North Macedonia) Dimitar Meckarovski

16 October 2009
13:00 CET

Spain	6–0	Faroe Islands
Alcácer 1'; Suso 26', 69', 80'; Juanmi 31', 36'	Report

Concordia, Chiajna
Referee: (Malta) Clayton Pisani

18 October 2009
10:00 CET

Romania	4–0	Faroe Islands
Gavra 19'; Vatajelu 43'; Petrea 77'; Baluta 80+1'	Report

Town Stadium, Buftea
Referee: (Malta) Clayton Pisani

18 October 2009
13:00 CET

Lithuania	1–9	Spain
Jefisov 44'	Report	16', 62', 80+1' Alcácer; 20' Osede; 30', 37', 78' Bernat; 50' Rafinha; 80+2' Suso

Concordia, Chiajna
Referee: (Georgia (country)) George Vadachkoria

21 October 2009
10:00 CET

Spain	4–1	Romania
Suso 10'; Rafinha 33'; Ortí 55', 72'	Report	62' Vatajelu

Concordia, Chiajna
Referee: (North Macedonia) Dimitar Meckarovski

21 October 2009
13:00 CET

Faroe Islands	2–3	Lithuania
Ellingsgaard 21'; Suduroy 54'	Report	7' Baranauskas; 36' Jefisov; 48' Gedminas

Town Stadium, Buftea
Referee: (Georgia (country)) George Vadachkoria

=== Group 3 ===
Team	Pld	W	D	L	GF	GA	GD	Pts
Croatia	3	2	1	0	4	2	+2	7
Belgium	3	1	1	1	4	3	+1	4
Denmark	3	1	0	2	10	6	+4	3
Montenegro	3	0	2	1	3	10	−7	2

23 September 2009
15:30 CET

Croatia	1–1	Montenegro
Čorić 42' (o.g.)	Report	28' Nikolić

Pod Goricom, Podgorica
Referee: (Turkey) Fırat Aydınus

23 September 2009
15:30 CET

Belgium	3–1	Denmark
Arslanagić 39'; Van der Bruggen 40+1'; Lallemand 61'	Report	23' Geertsen

Camp FSCG, Podgorica
Referee: (Wales) Huw Jones

25 September 2009
15:30 CET

Denmark	1–2	Croatia
Zohore 70'	Report	9' Ivanić; 34' Tezak

Gradski, Nikšić
Referee: (Turkey) Fırat Aydınus

25 September 2009
15:30 CET

Montenegro	1–1	Belgium
Gardašević 57' (pen.)	Report	24' Hazard

Camp FSCG, Podgorica
Referee: (Poland) Hubert Siejewicz

28 September 2009
15:30 CET

Belgium	0–1	Croatia
	Report	56' Livaja

Camp FSCG, Podgorica
Referee: (Poland) Hubert Siejewicz

28 September 2009
15:30 CET

Denmark	8–1	Montenegro
Zohore 28', 38', 56'; Geertsen 37'; Gytkjær 43'; Jensen 62' 69'; Fischer 80+1'	Report	39' Raičević

Gradski, Nikšić
Referee: (Wales) Huw Jones

=== Group 4 ===
Team	Pld	W	D	L	GF	GA	GD	Pts
Austria	3	2	1	0	7	3	+4	7
Poland	3	2	0	1	13	5	+8	6
Israel	3	1	0	2	6	10	−4	3
Armenia	3	0	1	2	3	11	−8	1

9 October 2009
12:00 CET

Poland	2–4	Austria
Wiktorski 21'; Przybyłko 40'	Report	14' Traunmüller; 57' Burušić; 61' Prosenik; 80+1' (pen.) Holzhauser

City Stadium GOS, Nadarzyn
Referee: (Cyprus) Leontios Trattou

9 October 2009
15:00 CET

Israel	6–1	Armenia
Krasnostavsky 3'; Halabi 28' (pen.), 77'; Elbaz 51'; Genish 71'; Izenstein 75'	Report	32' H. Hovhannisyan

MZOS Znicz, Pruszkow
Referee: (Faroe Islands) Petur Reinert

11 October 2009
12:00 CET

Armenia	1–4	Poland
Miranian 59'	Report	44' (o.g.) G. Hovhannisian; 49' Nalepa; 56' Bogusławski; 80+2' Serafin

City Stadium OSIR, Grodzisk Mazowiecki
Referee: (Faroe Islands) Petur Reinert

11 October 2009
15:00 CET

Israel	0–2	Austria
	Report	39' Vaštić; 80+3' Burušić

MZOS Znicz, Pruszkow
Referee: (Belgium) Christof Virant

14 October 2009
15:00 CET

Poland	7–0	Israel
Nalepa 8', 43'; Byszewski 21'; Romachow 38'; Wiktorski 58'; Przybyłko 59'; Drewniak 76'	Report

MZOS Znicz, Pruszkow
Referee: (Belgium) Christof Virant

14 October 2009
15:00 CET

Austria	1–1	Armenia
Prosenik 51'	Report	62' Poghosyan

City Stadium OSIR, Grodzisk Mazowiecki
Referee: (Cyprus) Leontios Trattou

=== Group 5 ===
Team	Pld	W	D	L	GF	GA	GD	Pts
Turkey	3	2	0	1	5	3	+2	6
Germany	3	2	0	1	4	2	+2	6
Finland	3	2	0	1	6	4	+2	6
Macedonia	3	0	0	3	3	9	−6	0

Note: Turkey, Germany and Finland are ranked by the goal difference resulting from the group matches played among them: Turkey +1 (3–2), Germany +0 (2–2), Finland −1 (1–2).

23 October 2009
13:00 CET

Turkey	2–0	Finland
Akçakın 13'; Çalış 57'	Report

Kukuš Stadium, Strumica
Referee: (Switzerland) Stephan Studer

23 October 2009
13:00 CET

Germany	2–0	Macedonia
Parker 63', 80'	Report

Mladost Stadium, Strumica
Referee: (Bulgaria) Nikolay Yordanov

25 October 2009
13:00 CET

Turkey	2–1	Macedonia
Akçakın 15', 60' (pen.)	Report	66' Hadzija

Kukuš Stadium, Strumica
Referee: (Scotland) Euan Norris

25 October 2009
13:00 CET

Finland	1–0	Germany
Väyrynen 75'	Report

Mladost Stadium, Strumica
Referee: (Switzerland) Stephan Studer

28 October 2009
13:00 CET

Germany	2–1	Turkey
Parker 4'; Hahn 65'	Report	2' Çalış

Kukuš Stadium, Strumica
Referee: (Scotland) Euan Norris

28 October 2009
13:00 CET

Macedonia	2–5	Finland
Hadzija 40'; Angelov 61'	Report	16' Lähde; 46', 58' (pen.) Väyrynen; 71' Seferi; 73' (o.g.) Kandikijan

Mladost Stadium, Strumica
Referee: (Bulgaria) Nikolay Yordanov

=== Group 6 ===
Team	Pld	W	D	L	GF	GA	GD	Pts
Republic of Ireland	3	2	1	0	3	1	+2	7
Sweden	3	1	2	0	2	0	+2	5
Bulgaria	3	1	1	1	5	2	+3	4
Latvia	3	0	0	3	0	7	−7	0

27 September 2009
13:00 CET

Sweden	2–0	Latvia
Sandberg Magnusson 68'; Nazari 70' (pen.)	Report

Albena 1, Albena
Attendance: 50
Referee: (Greece) Georgios Daloukas

27 September 2009
15:00 CET

Republic of Ireland	2–1	Bulgaria
Sutherland 38'; Purdy 80+3'	Report	80' Nedelev

Druzhba Stadium, Dobrich
Attendance: 300
Referee: (Malta) Marco Borg

29 September 2009
13:00 CET

Republic of Ireland	1–0	Latvia
O'Brien 79'	Report

Albena 1, Albena
Attendance: 80
Referee: (Malta) Marco Borg

29 September 2009
15:00 CET

Bulgaria	0–0	Sweden
	Report

Druzhba Stadium, Dobrich
Attendance: 250
Referee: (Hungary) Tamas Bognar

2 October 2009
15:00 CET

Sweden	0–0	Republic of Ireland
	Report

Albena 1, Albena
Attendance: 50
Referee: (Greece) Georgios Daloukas

2 October 2009
15:00 CET

Latvia	0–4	Bulgaria
	Report	7', 36' A. Georgiev; 58' Kozhuharov; 61' Botev

Druzhba Stadium, Dobrich
Attendance: 150
Referee: (Hungary) Tamas Bognar

=== Group 7 ===
Team	Pld	W	D	L	GF	GA	GD	Pts
France	3	2	1	0	7	3	+4	7
Ukraine	3	1	2	0	2	1	+1	5
Estonia	3	1	1	1	2	3	−1	4
Slovenia	3	0	0	3	1	5	−4	0

17 October 2009
11:00 CET

France	3–1	Slovenia
Deligny 8'; A. Doucouré 41'; Sanogo 60'	Report	60' Palčič

Linnastaadion, Rakvere
Referee: (Bulgaria) Tsvetan Georgiev

17 October 2009
14:00 CET

Ukraine	0–0	Estonia
	Report

Kadrioru Stadium, Tallinn
Referee: (Montenegro) Jovan Kaludjerovic

19 October 2009
11:00 CET

Slovenia	0–1	Ukraine
	Report	40' Khamid

Linnastaadion, Rakvere
Referee: (Turkey) Halis Özkahya

19 October 2009
14:00 CET

France	3–1	Estonia
Sanogo 7', 70'; Omrani 78'	Report	20' Leht

Kadrioru Stadium, Tallinn
Referee: (Montenegro) Jovan Kaludjerovic

22 October 2009
14:00 CET

Ukraine	1–1	France
Lukanyuk 21'	Report	73' Tandia

Linnastaadion, Rakvere
Referee: (Turkey) Halis Özkahya

22 October 2009
14:00 CET

Estonia	1–0	Slovenia
Rättel 58'	Report

Kadrioru Stadium, Tallinn
Referee: (Bulgaria) Tsvetan Georgiev

=== Group 8 ===
Team	Pld	W	D	L	GF	GA	GD	Pts
Netherlands	3	2	0	1	6	2	+4	6
Northern Ireland	3	2	0	1	4	1	+3	6
Malta	3	1	1	1	2	3	−1	4
Andorra	3	0	1	2	0	6	−6	1

22 October 2009
12:00 CET

Netherlands	4–0	Andorra
Bartels 35'; Locadia 40'; Denswil 47'; Lewis 54'	Report

Estadi Comunal, Andorra-la-Vella
Referee: Aleksander Gauzer (Kazakhstan)
22 October 2009
16:00 CET

Northern Ireland	2–0	Malta
Wilson 13'; McLellan 39'	Report

Estadi Comunal, Andorra-la-Vella
Referee: Pavle Radovanović (Montenegro)

24 October 2009
12:00 CET

Andorra	0–2	Northern Ireland
	Report	23', 25' Carson

Estadi Comunal, Andorra-la-Vella
Referee: Aleksander Gauzer (Kazakhstan)
24 October 2009
16:00 CET

Netherlands	1–2	Malta
Locadia 80+4'	Report	47' (pen.) Borg; 70' (pen.) D'Agostino

Estadi Comunal, Andorra-la-Vella
Referee: Vitaly Sevostyanik (Belarus)

27 October 2009
12:00 CET

Northern Ireland	0–1	Netherlands
	Report	49' Locadia

Estadi Comunal, Andorra-la-Vella
Referee: Pavle Radovanović (Montenegro)
27 October 2009
12:00 CET

Malta	0–0	Andorra
	Report

Camp d'Esports del M.I. Consell General, Andorra-la-Vella
Referee: Vitaly Sevostyanik (Belarus)

=== Group 9 ===
Team	Pld	W	D	L	GF	GA	GD	Pts
Greece	3	1	2	0	3	2	+1	5
Norway	3	1	1	1	2	1	+1	4
Italy	3	1	1	1	5	2	+3	4
Moldova	3	0	2	1	2	7	−5	2

24 October 2009
11:30 CET

Norway	0–1	Greece
	Report	51' Diamantakos

Comunale, Teramo
Referee: (Israel) Menashe Masiah

24 October 2009
15:00 CET

Italy	5–0	Moldova
Magnaghi 19', 62'; Baccarin 28' (pen.); Quaggiotto 45', 49'	Report

Stadio Rubens Fadini, Giulianova
Referee: (Azerbaijan) Fariz Yusifov

26 October 2009
11:30 CET

Moldova	0–0	Norway
	Report

Stadio Rubens Fadini, Giulianova
Referee: (Hungary) Mihaly Fabian

26 October 2009
15:00 CET

Italy	0–0	Greece
	Report

Comunale, Teramo
Referee: (Israel) Menashe Masiah

29 October 2009
11:30 CET

Norway	2–0	Italy
Nielsen 20'; Anene 80+3'	Report

Stadio Rubens Fadini, Giulianova
Referee: (Hungary) Mihaly Fabian

29 October 2009
11:30 CET

Greece	2–2	Moldova
Diamantakos 37', 74' (pen.)	Report	21' Iurcu; 28' Dima

Comunale, Teramo
Referee: (Azerbaijan) Fariz Yusifov

=== Group 10 ===
Team	Pld	W	D	L	GF	GA	GD	Pts
Portugal	3	2	1	0	6	3	+3	7
Georgia	3	2	0	1	6	5	+1	6
Cyprus	3	1	0	2	5	7	−2	3
Scotland	3	0	1	2	4	6	−2	1

20 October 2009
20:30 CET

Scotland	1–2	Cyprus
C. McGregor 62'	Report	73' Sotiriou; 80+2' Englezou

East End Park, Dunfermline
Referee: (Latvia) Vadims Direktorenko

20 October 2009
20:30 CET

Portugal	2–0	Georgia
Esgaio 28'; João Mário 72' (pen.)	Report

Forthbank Stadium, Stirling
Referee: (Moldova) Ghennadi Sidenco

22 October 2009
20:30 CET

Scotland	1–2	Georgia
C. McGregor 40'	Report	8' Chanturia; 52' Skhirtladze

Stark's Park, Kirkcaldy
Referee: (Slovakia) Richard Trutz

22 October 2009
20:30 CET

Cyprus	1–2	Portugal
Sotiriou 30'	Report	56' Bruma; 75' Betinho

Bayview, Methil
Referee: (Latvia) Vadims Direktorenko

25 October 2009
16:00 CET

Portugal	2–2	Scotland
João Carlos 39'; Figueiredo 47'	Report	7' C. McGregor; 32' Walker

Stark's Park, Kirkcaldy
Referee: (Slovakia) Richard Trutz

25 October 2009
16:00 CET

Georgia	4–2	Cyprus
Gagnidze 30'; Skhirtladze 37'; Chanturia 61', 69'	Report	38' Sotiriou; 50' Chatzigeorgiou

Forthbank Stadium, Stirling
Referee: (Moldova) Ghennadi Sidenco

=== Group 11 ===
Team	Pld	W	D	L	GF	GA	GD	Pts
Hungary	3	2	1	0	7	1	+6	7
Slovakia	3	2	0	1	5	1	+4	6
Luxembourg	3	1	1	1	4	5	−1	4
Albania	3	0	0	3	2	11	−9	0

25 September 2009
14:30 CET

Slovakia	2–0	Luxembourg
Stulajter 32'; Kovač 80+2'	Report

Global Football Park, Telki
Referee: (Andorra) Ignasi Villamayor Rozados

25 September 2009
17:30 CET

Hungary	5–0	Albania
Szloga 8'; Serfözö 37', 49', 59'; Mumajesi 80+2' (o.g.)	Report

Global Football Park, Telki
Referee: (Moldova) Veaceslav Banari

27 September 2009
14:30 CET

Hungary	1–1	Luxembourg
Magyar 3'	Report	12' Deidda

Tatai Honved Atletikai Klub, Tata
Referee: (Andorra) Ignasi Villamayor Rozados

27 September 2009
17:30 CET

Albania	0–3	Slovakia
	Report	12' Miklos; 64' Jacko; 78' Schranz

Global Football Park, Telki
Referee: (Croatia) Damir Batinic

30 September 2009
16:00 CET

Slovakia	0–1	Hungary
	Report	80' Vass

Tatai Honved Atletikai Klub, Tata
Referee: (Croatia) Damir Batinic

30 September 2009
16:00 CET

Luxembourg	3–2	Albania
Muslji 72'; Bastos 75'; Boro 80+1'	Report	25' F. Hoxha; 61' Abdija

Global Football Park, Telki
Referee: (Moldova) Veaceslav Banari

=== Group 12 ===
Team	Pld	W	D	L	GF	GA	GD	Pts
Wales	3	2	1	0	7	5	+2	7
Bosnia and Herzegovina	3	0	3	0	3	3	0	3
Iceland	3	0	2	1	4	5	−1	2
Russia	3	0	2	1	2	3	−1	2

28 September 2009
19:00 CET

Wales	3–2	Iceland
Newall 50'; Amadi-Holloway 51'; Peniket 68'	Report	59' Fridjonsson; 66' Emilsson

Richmond Park, Carmarthen
Referee: (Slovenia) Matej Jug

28 September 2009
19:00 CET

Russia	0–0	Bosnia and Herzegovina
	Report

Stebonheath Park, Llanelli
Referee: (Malta) Christopher Lautier

30 September 2009
19:00 CET

Wales	2–2	Bosnia and Herzegovina
Peniket 43'; Loveridge 80'	Report	48' Maletić; 63' Sarvan

Stebonheath Park, Llanelli
Referee: (Finland) Mattias Gestranius

30 September 2009
19:00 CET

Iceland	1–1	Russia
Emilsson 59'	Report	25' Kutin

Bridge Meadow Stadium, Haverfordwest
Referee: (Slovenia) Matej Jug

3 October 2009
16:00 CET

Russia	1–2	Wales
Barsov 72'	Report	78' Bond; 80+1' Loveridge

Bridge Meadow Stadium, Haverfordwest
Referee: (Finland) Mattias Gestranius

3 October 2009
16:00 CET

Bosnia and Herzegovina	1–1	Iceland
Bevab 40'	Report	69' Gunnarsson

Richmond Park, Carmarthen
Referee: (Malta) Christopher Lautier

=== Group 13 ===
Team	Pld	W	D	L	GF	GA	GD	Pts
Czech Republic	3	3	0	0	9	0	+9	9
Switzerland	3	2	0	1	12	4	+8	6
Belarus	3	1	0	2	4	3	+1	3
San Marino	3	0	0	3	0	18	−18	0

5 September 2009
13:00 CET

Switzerland	10–0	San Marino
Jevtić 4' (pen.); Zwimpfer 31'; Vuleta 47', 50', 61', 73'; Kleiber 67'; Miani 70'; Geissmann 75'; Žarković 80+2'	Report

City Stadium, Molodechno
Referee: Levan Kvaratskhelia (Georgia)
5 September 2009
16:00 CET

Czech Republic	1–0	Belarus
F. Twardzik 65'	Report

Dinamo-Yuni Stadium, Minsk
Referee: Boško Jovanetić (Serbia)

7 September 2009
13:00 CET

San Marino	0–4	Czech Republic
	Report	F.Twardzik 26'; Rozsíval 69'; P.Twardzik 70'; Mandula 79'

Torpedo Stadium, Minsk
Referee: Levan Kvaratskhelia (Georgia)
7 September 2009
16:00 CET

Switzerland	2–0	Belarus
Desole 36' (pen.), 62'	Report

Dinamo-Yuni Stadium, Minsk
Referee: Vusal Aliyev (Azerbaijan)

10 September 2009
16:00 CET

Czech Republic	4–0	Switzerland
F. Twardzik 6'; Rozsíval 21'; Hybš 39'; Česlák 80+2'	Report

City Stadium, Molodechno
Referee: Boško Jovanetic (Serbia)
10 September 2009
16:00 CET

Belarus	4–0	San Marino
Kavalyow 3', 37', 77'; Shpak 72'	Report

City Stadium, Borisov
Referee: Vusal Aliyev (Azerbaijan)

=== Third-placed qualifiers ===
At the end of the first stage, a comparison is made between the third placed teams from all groups. The two best third-placed teams advanced to the next round, with only the results against the top two teams from each group to be used for classifying the teams.

Group	Team	Pld	W	D	L	GF	GA	GD	Pts
8	Malta	2	1	0	1	2	3	−1	3
5	Finland	2	1	0	1	1	2	−1	3
12	Iceland	2	0	1	1	3	4	−1	1
6	Bulgaria	2	0	1	1	1	2	−1	1
7	Estonia	2	0	1	1	1	3	−2	1
11	Luxembourg	2	0	1	1	1	3	−2	1
9	Italy	2	0	1	1	0	2	−2	1
1	Azerbaijan	2	0	1	1	0	4	−4	1
10	Cyprus	2	0	0	2	3	6	−3	0
3	Denmark	2	0	0	2	2	5	−3	0
13	Belarus	2	0	0	2	0	3	−3	0
2	Lithuania	2	0	0	2	1	10	−9	0
4	Israel	2	0	0	2	0	9	−9	0
