= Twardzik =

Twardzik is a surname. Notable people with the surname include:

- Dan Twardzik (born 1991), Czech footballer
- Dave Twardzik (born 1950), American basketball player
- Dick Twardzik (1931–1955), American jazz pianist
- Filip Twardzik (born 1993), Czech footballer
- Patrik Twardzik (born 1993), Czech footballer
- René Twardzik (born 1970), Czech footballer
- Ted Twardzik, Mrs. T's Pierogies founder
