= 2010 UEFA European Under-17 Championship elite round =

Football tournament qualification stage

2010 UEFA European Under-17 Football Championship (Elite Round) was the second round of qualifications for the final tournament of UEFA U-17 Championship 2010. The Elite round was played between March 17 and April 1, 2010. The 28 teams advancing from the qualifying round were distributed into seven groups of four teams each, with each group being contested in a round-robin format, with one of the four teams hosting all six group games. The seven group-winning teams automatically qualified for the final tournament in Liechtenstein. The host nation was guaranteed one of the eight final tournament spots, but since Liechtenstein withdrew, the eight team to qualify was chosen from the second-placed teams with the best record against the first and third placed teams in its group.

Each team was placed in one of four drawing pots, according to their qualifying round results. The seven sides with the best records were placed in Pot A, and so forth until Pot D, which contained the seven teams with the weakest records. During the draw, each group was filled with one team from every pot, with the only restriction being that teams that played each other in the first qualifying round could not be drawn into the same group again. The draw was conducted December 7, 2009.

| Pot A | Pot B | Pot C | Pot D |
|---|---|---|---|
| England; Spain; Czech Republic; Hungary; Austria; France; Portugal | Wales; Croatia; Republic of Ireland; Poland; Switzerland; Netherlands; Slovakia | Northern Ireland; Finland; Romania; Turkey; Germany; Georgia; Sweden | Greece; Ukraine; Belgium; Norway; Serbia; Malta; Bosnia and Herzegovina |

The hosts of the seven one-venue mini-tournament groups are indicated below in italics.

== Stages ==
=== Group 1 ===
| Team | Pld | W | D | L | GF | GA | GD | Pts |
|---|---|---|---|---|---|---|---|---|
| Czech Republic | 3 | 2 | 0 | 1 | 3 | 2 | +1 | 6 |
| Netherlands | 3 | 2 | 0 | 1 | 4 | 2 | +2 | 6 |
| Georgia | 3 | 1 | 1 | 1 | 4 | 4 | 0 | 4 |
| Ukraine | 3 | 0 | 1 | 2 | 3 | 6 | −3 | 1 |

Czech Republic advances due to head-to-head result

March 25, 2010
15:00 CET

| Czech Republic | 0–1 | Georgia |
|---|---|---|
| | Report | 40+1' Kazaishvili |

Na Slajsi, Lanžhot
Referee: Oliver Drachta (Austria)

March 25, 2010
15:00 CET

| Netherlands | 2–0 | Ukraine |
|---|---|---|
| Locadia 7'; Klaassen 63' | Report |

Baník Ratíškovice, Ratíškovice
Referee: Thorvaldur Arnason (Iceland)

March 27, 2010
15:00 CET

| Czech Republic | 2–1 | Ukraine |
|---|---|---|
| Hurka 15'; Twardzik 80+1' | Report | 64' Khamid |

FC Kyjov, Kyjov
Referee: Elmir Pilav (Bosnia and Herzegovina)

March 27, 2010
15:00 CET

| Georgia | 1–2 | Netherlands |
|---|---|---|
| Chanturia 16' | Report | 4' Maher; 69' Locadia |

Mestsky sportovni klub Breclav, Břeclav
Referee: Thorvaldur Arnason (Iceland)

March 30, 2010
16:00 CET

| Netherlands | 0–1 | Czech Republic |
|---|---|---|
| | Report | 16' Hurka |

Mestsky sportovni klub Breclav, Břeclav
Referee: Oliver Drachta (Austria)

March 30, 2010
16:00 CET

| Ukraine | 2–2 | Georgia |
|---|---|---|
| Khamid 63'; Lukanyuk 71' (pen.) | Report | 45', 78' (pen.) Kazaishvili |

Na Slajsi, Lanžhot
Referee: Elmir Pilav (Bosnia and Herzegovina)

=== Group 2 ===
| Team | Pld | W | D | L | GF | GA | GD | Pts |
|---|---|---|---|---|---|---|---|---|
| Portugal | 3 | 2 | 1 | 0 | 7 | 2 | +5 | 7 |
| Croatia | 3 | 2 | 0 | 1 | 5 | 3 | +2 | 6 |
| Bosnia and Herzegovina | 3 | 0 | 2 | 1 | 5 | 6 | −1 | 2 |
| Romania | 3 | 0 | 1 | 2 | 4 | 10 | −6 | 1 |

March 19, 2010
15:00 CET

| Portugal | 4–1 | Romania |
|---|---|---|
| João Mário 24' (pen.); Figueiredo 32'; Betinho 43'; Tozé 80+2' | Report | 26' Vatajelu |

Grbavica Stadium, Sarajevo
Referee: Ilias Spathas (Greece)

March 19, 2010
15:00 CET

| Croatia | 2–1 | Bosnia and Herzegovina |
|---|---|---|
| Aleksić 33'; Kukavica 65' (o.g.) | Report | 51' Ćemalović |

Asim Ferhatović Hase Stadium, Sarajevo
Referee: Davit Kharitonashvili (Georgia (country))

March 21, 2010
15:00 CET

| Portugal | 1–1 | Bosnia and Herzegovina |
|---|---|---|
| Bruma 19' | Report | 13' Kukavica |

Asim Ferhatović Hase Stadium, Sarajevo
Referee: Davit Kharitonashvili (Georgia (country))

March 21, 2010
15:00 CET

| Romania | 0–3 | Croatia |
|---|---|---|
| | Report | 9' Livaja; 14' Ivančić; 30' Džoni |

Grbavica Stadium, Sarajevo
Referee: Jan Valasek (Slovakia)

March 24, 2010
15:00 CET

| Croatia | 0–2 | Portugal |
|---|---|---|
| | Report | 57' Esgaio; 80+1' Cavaleiro |

Asim Ferhatović Hase Stadium, Sarajevo
Referee: Ilias Spathas (Greece)

March 24, 2010
15:00 CET

| Bosnia and Herzegovina | 3–3 | Romania |
|---|---|---|
| Sivišić 1'; Ćemalović 12', 45' | Report | 39', 66' Băluță; 80' Gavra |

Grbavica Stadium, Sarajevo
Referee: Jan Valasek (Slovakia)

=== Group 3 ===
| Team | Pld | W | D | L | GF | GA | GD | Pts |
|---|---|---|---|---|---|---|---|---|
| Greece | 3 | 2 | 1 | 0 | 7 | 3 | +4 | 7 |
| Republic of Ireland | 3 | 2 | 0 | 1 | 4 | 3 | +1 | 6 |
| Austria | 3 | 0 | 2 | 1 | 5 | 8 | −3 | 2 |
| Finland | 3 | 0 | 1 | 2 | 4 | 6 | −2 | 1 |

March 19, 2010
10:30 CET

| Republic of Ireland | 0–3 | Greece |
|---|---|---|
| | Report | 57', 70' Georgios; 79' Diamantakos |

Municipal Stadium of Kato Achaia, Kato Achaia
Referee: Dawid Piasecki (Poland)

March 19, 2010
14:00 CET

| Austria | 3–3 | Finland |
|---|---|---|
| Burušić 16'; Holzhauser 68' (pen.); Traunmüller 80+1' | Report | 8' Mäkelä; 28' Paananen; 42' Väyrynen |

Pampeloponnisiako Stadium, Patras
Referee: Anar Salmanov (Azerbaijan)

March 21, 2010
10:30 CET

| Austria | 2–2 | Greece |
|---|---|---|
| Burušić 8', 33' | Report | 4' Rougkalas; 80+4' Diamantakos |

Municipal Stadium of Kato Achaia, Kato Achaia
Referee: Sébastien Delferiere (Belgium)

March 21, 2010
14:00 CET

| Finland | 0–1 | Republic of Ireland |
|---|---|---|
| | Report | 54' Knight |

Pampeloponnisiako Stadium, Patras
Referee: Anar Salmanov (Azerbaijan)

March 24, 2010
10:30 CET

| Republic of Ireland | 3–0 | Austria |
|---|---|---|
| O'Brien 20', 72'; Knight 44' | Report |

Pampeloponnisiako Stadium, Patras
Referee: Sébastien Delferiere (Belgium)

March 24, 2010
10:30 CET

| Greece | 2–1 | Finland |
|---|---|---|
| Diamantakos 72', 79' | Report | 48' Väyrynen |

Kostas Davourlis Stadium, Patras
Referee: Dawid Piasecki (Poland)

=== Group 4 ===
| Team | Pld | W | D | L | GF | GA | GD | Pts |
|---|---|---|---|---|---|---|---|---|
| Spain | 3 | 2 | 0 | 1 | 6 | 1 | +5 | 6 |
| Belgium | 3 | 2 | 0 | 1 | 3 | 1 | +2 | 6 |
| Northern Ireland | 3 | 2 | 0 | 1 | 2 | 4 | −2 | 6 |
| Poland | 3 | 0 | 0 | 3 | 0 | 5 | −5 | 0 |

Spain advances due to a +3 goal difference in games among tied teams (Belgium 0, Northern Ireland −3)

March 17, 2010
16:00 CET

| Poland | 0–2 | Belgium |
|---|---|---|
| | Report | 17' Lallemand; 66' Arslanagic |

Shamrock Park, Portadown
Referee: Antti Munukka (Finland)

March 17, 2010
20:30 CET

| Spain | 4–0 | Northern Ireland |
|---|---|---|
| Juanmi 43', 75'; Alcácer 69', 77' | Report |

The Showgrounds, Coleraine
Referee: Ionut Marius Avram (Romania)

March 19, 2010
16:00 CET

| Spain | 0–1 | Belgium |
|---|---|---|
| | Report | 63' Raman |

Mourneview Park, Lurgan
Referee: Alan Mario Sant (Malta)

March 19, 2010
20:30 CET

| Northern Ireland | 1–0 | Poland |
|---|---|---|
| Ball 70' | Report |

The Oval, Belfast
Referee: Ionut Marius Avram (Romania)

March 22, 2010
20:30 CET

| Poland | 0–2 | Spain |
|---|---|---|
| | Report | 3', 79' (pen.) Alcácer |

The Showgrounds, Coleraine
Referee: Antti Munukka (Finland)

March 22, 2010
20:30 CET

| Belgium | 0–1 | Northern Ireland |
|---|---|---|
| | Report | 43' McAlinden |

Mourneview Park, Lurgan
Referee: Alan Mario Sant (Malta)

=== Group 5 ===
| Team | Pld | W | D | L | GF | GA | GD | Pts |
|---|---|---|---|---|---|---|---|---|
| Turkey | 3 | 2 | 1 | 0 | 4 | 1 | +3 | 7 |
| France | 3 | 2 | 0 | 1 | 5 | 1 | +4 | 6 |
| Wales | 3 | 0 | 2 | 1 | 1 | 5 | −4 | 2 |
| Norway | 3 | 0 | 1 | 2 | 0 | 3 | −3 | 1 |

March 26, 2010
18:00 CET

| Wales | 0–0 | Norway |
|---|---|---|
| | Report |

François Le Parco, La Rochelle
Referee: Artyom Kuchin (Kazakhstan)

March 26, 2010
20:00 CET

| France | 0–1 | Turkey |
|---|---|---|
| | Report | 34' Derici |

Complexe Sportif, Périgny
Referee: Steven McLean (Scotland)

March 28, 2010
17:00 CET

| Turkey | 1–1 | Wales |
|---|---|---|
| Derici 44' | Report | 57' March |

François Le Parco, La Rochelle
Referee: Slavko Vinčić (Slovenia)

March 28, 2010
19:00 CET

| France | 1–0 | Norway |
|---|---|---|
| Deligny 75' | Report |

Complexe Sportif, Périgny
Referee: Steven McLean (Scotland)

March 31, 2010
18:00 CET

| Wales | 0–4 | France |
|---|---|---|
| | Report | 35' Koura; 52', 70', 71' Omrani |

François Le Parco, La Rochelle
Referee: Artyom Kuchin (Kazakhstan)

March 31, 2010
18:00 CET

| Norway | 0–2 | Turkey |
|---|---|---|
| | Report | 11' Yokuşlu; 44' Azğar |

Complexe Sportif, Périgny
Referee: Slavko Vinčić (Slovenia)

=== Group 6 ===
| Team | Pld | W | D | L | GF | GA | GD | Pts |
|---|---|---|---|---|---|---|---|---|
| Switzerland | 3 | 2 | 0 | 1 | 5 | 3 | +2 | 6 |
| Germany | 3 | 2 | 0 | 1 | 5 | 2 | +3 | 6 |
| Serbia | 3 | 1 | 1 | 1 | 3 | 5 | −2 | 4 |
| Hungary | 3 | 0 | 1 | 2 | 1 | 4 | −3 | 1 |

Switzerland advances due to head-to-head result

March 25, 2010
19:30 CET

| Hungary | 0–1 | Germany |
|---|---|---|
| | Report | 17' (pen.) Pusch |

Esp Stadium, Fislisbach
Referee: Eli Hacmon (Israel)

March 25, 2010
19:30 CET

| Switzerland | 1–2 | Serbia |
|---|---|---|
| Vuleta 10' | Report | 32', 60' Nastasić |

Sportanlagen Trinermatten, Zofingen
Referee: Raymond Crangle (Northern Ireland)

March 27, 2010
16:00 CET

| Hungary | 0–0 | Serbia |
|---|---|---|
| | Report |

Sportanlagen Trinermatten, Zofingen
Referee: Suren Baliyan (Armenia)

March 27, 2010
16:00 CET

| Germany | 0–1 | Switzerland |
|---|---|---|
| | Report | 56' Savić |

Stadion Brügglifeld, Aarau
Referee: Eli Hacmon (Israel)

March 30, 2010
19:30 CET

| Switzerland | 3–1 | Hungary |
|---|---|---|
| Vuleta 16', 23'; Savić 43' | Report | 52' Adorján |

Esp Stadium, Fislisbach
Referee: Suren Baliyan (Armenia)

March 30, 2010
19:30 CET

| Serbia | 1–4 | Germany |
|---|---|---|
| Georgijević 35' | Report | 6' Kittel; 18' Parker; 30' Bittencourt; 55' Younes |

Stadion Brügglifeld, Aarau
Referee: Raymond Crangle (Northern Ireland)

=== Group 7 ===
| Team | Pld | W | D | L | GF | GA | GD | Pts |
|---|---|---|---|---|---|---|---|---|
| England | 3 | 3 | 0 | 0 | 11 | 0 | +11 | 9 |
| Sweden | 3 | 2 | 0 | 1 | 7 | 4 | +3 | 6 |
| Slovakia | 3 | 1 | 0 | 2 | 2 | 4 | −2 | 3 |
| Malta | 3 | 0 | 0 | 3 | 0 | 12 | −12 | 0 |

March 27, 2010
14:00 CET

| Slovakia | 2–0 | Malta |
|---|---|---|
| Schranz 52'; Špilár 58' | Report |

Pirelli Stadium, Burton upon Trent
Referee: Kristo Tohver (Estonia)

March 27, 2010
16:00 CET

| England | 4–0 | Sweden |
|---|---|---|
| Wickham 21'; Afobe 32'; Hall 73'; Keane 80+2' | Report |

Sixfields Stadium, Northampton
Referee: Ioannis Anastasiou (Cyprus)

March 29, 2010
16:00 CET

| Sweden | 2–0 | Slovakia |
|---|---|---|
| Ohlander 13' (pen.); Söderqvist 55' | Report |

Sixfields Stadium, Northampton
Referee: Kristo Tohver (Estonia)

March 29, 2010
20:00 CET

| England | 5–0 | Malta |
|---|---|---|
| Aneke 20', 36'; Keane 30'; Afobe 38'; Kane 72' (pen.) | Report |

Pirelli Stadium, Burton upon Trent
Referee: Igor Pristovnik (Croatia)

April 1, 2010
20:00 CET

| Slovakia | 0–2 | England |
|---|---|---|
| | Report | Wickham 60'; Kane 76' |

Sixfields Stadium, Northampton
Referee: Igor Pristovnik (Croatia)

April 1, 2010
20:00 CET

| Malta | 0–5 | Sweden |
|---|---|---|
| | Report | Azulay 24'; Sandberg Magnusson 31', 51'; Törnros 68', 76' |

Pirelli Stadium, Burton upon Trent
Referee: Ioannis Anastasiou (Cyprus)

=== Second-placed qualifiers ===
At the end of the elite round, a comparison was made between the second placed teams from all groups. The best second-placed team advanced to the final round, with only the results against the first- and third-ranked teams from each group used to classifying the teams.

| Group | Team | Pld | W | D | L | GF | GA | GD | Pts |
|---|---|---|---|---|---|---|---|---|---|
| 5 | France | 2 | 1 | 0 | 1 | 4 | 1 | +3 | 3 |
| 6 | Germany | 2 | 1 | 0 | 1 | 4 | 2 | +2 | 3 |
| 3 | Republic of Ireland | 2 | 1 | 0 | 1 | 3 | 3 | 0 | 3 |
| 1 | Netherlands | 2 | 1 | 0 | 1 | 2 | 2 | 0 | 3 |
| 4 | Belgium | 2 | 1 | 0 | 1 | 1 | 1 | 0 | 3 |
| 2 | Croatia | 2 | 1 | 0 | 1 | 2 | 3 | −1 | 3 |
| 7 | Sweden | 2 | 1 | 0 | 1 | 2 | 4 | −2 | 3 |
