= Geertgen =

Geertgen is a given name. Notable people with the name include:

- Geertgen tot Sint Jans (c. 1465–c. 1495), Early Netherlandish painter
- Geertgen Wyntges (1636–1712), Dutch Golden Age flower painter

== See also ==
- Geertsen
