= Marko Maletić (footballer, born 1993) =

Bosnia and Herzegovina footballer (born 1993)

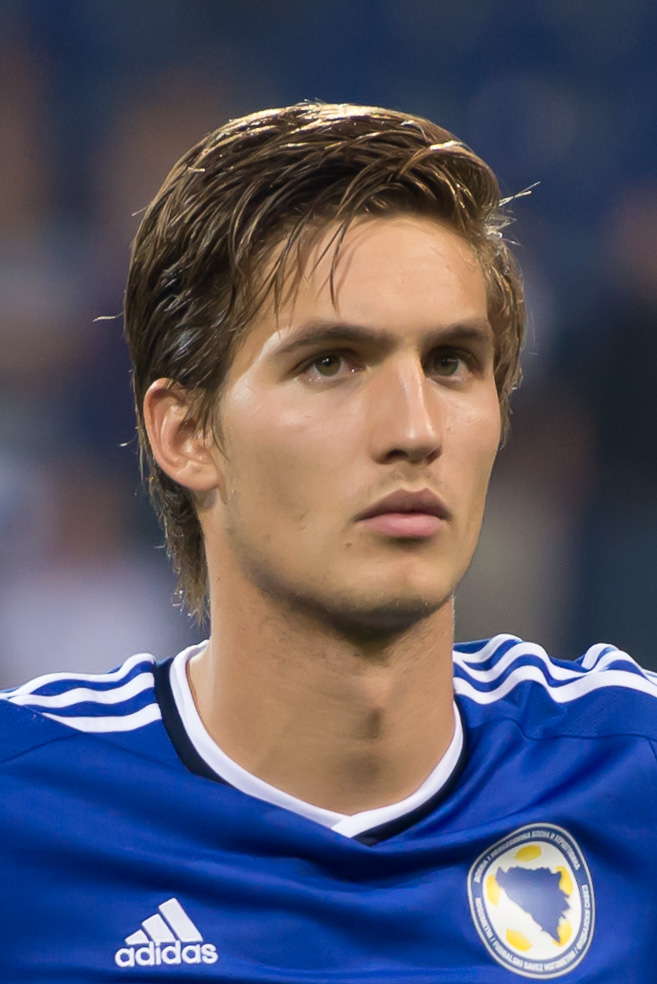
- Maletić in 2014

Personal information
- Date of birth: 25 October 1993 (age 33)
- Place of birth: Belgrade, FR Yugoslavia
- Height: 1.96 m (6 ft 5 in)
- Position: Striker

Team information
- Current team: Nardò
- Number: 9

Youth career
- –2004: Voetbalvereniging Lengel
- 2004–2009: De Graafschap
- 2010–2012: Utrecht

Senior career*
| Years | Team | Apps | (Gls) |
| 2012–2014 | VfB Stuttgart II | 14 | (1) |
| 2013–2014 | → FC Oss (loan) | 29 | (8) |
| 2014–2016 | Excelsior | 6 | (0) |
| 2015–2016 | → Telstar (loan) | 27 | (9) |
| 2016–2017 | Lommel United | 27 | (4) |
| 2017–2019 | Roeselare | 15 | (1) |
| 2018–2019 | → FC Dordrecht (loan) | 10 | (2) |
| 2019 | → Paris FC (loan) | 7 | (1) |
| 2019 | Paris FC II | 1 | (0) |
| 2019–2020 | Paris FC | 4 | (0) |
| 2020 | Stade-Lausanne | 12 | (2) |
| 2020–2021 | NK Aluminij | 14 | (0) |
| 2021 | Zlatibor Čajetina | 1 | (0) |
| 2022 | TOP Oss | 4 | (0) |
| 2022–2023 | Javor Ivanjica | 14 | (0) |
| 2023 | Nocerina | 17 | (8) |
| 2023–2024 | Renate | 10 | (0) |
| 2024 | Cjarlins Muzane | 12 | (1) |
| 2024– | Nardò | 8 | (3) |

International career
| 2009–2010 | Bosnia and Herzegovina U17 | 6 | (1) |
| 2011–2012 | Bosnia and Herzegovina U19 | 6 | (3) |
| 2012–2014 | Bosnia and Herzegovina U21 | 11 | (2) |
- * Club domestic league appearances and goals as of 17 November 2024

Marko Maletić (born 25 October 1993) is a Bosnian-Herzegovinian professional footballer who plays as a striker for Italian Serie D club Nardò. He holds dual Bosnian and Dutch citizenship, but competes internationally for Bosnia and Herzegovina.

== Club career ==
Maletić made his debut for VfB Stuttgart II on 25 August 2012 in the 3. Liga in a 3–0 victory against SpVgg Unterhaching.

On 2 September 2013, he was loaned out to FC Oss until the end of the season.

On 27 June 2014, Maletić signed a two-year deal with Eredivisie side Excelsior.

In June 2017, he moved to K.S.V. Roeselare.

In January 2019, Maletić joined Paris FC on loan from Roeselare until the end of the season.

In June 2022, Maletić signed with Javor Ivanjica in Serbia.

== International career ==
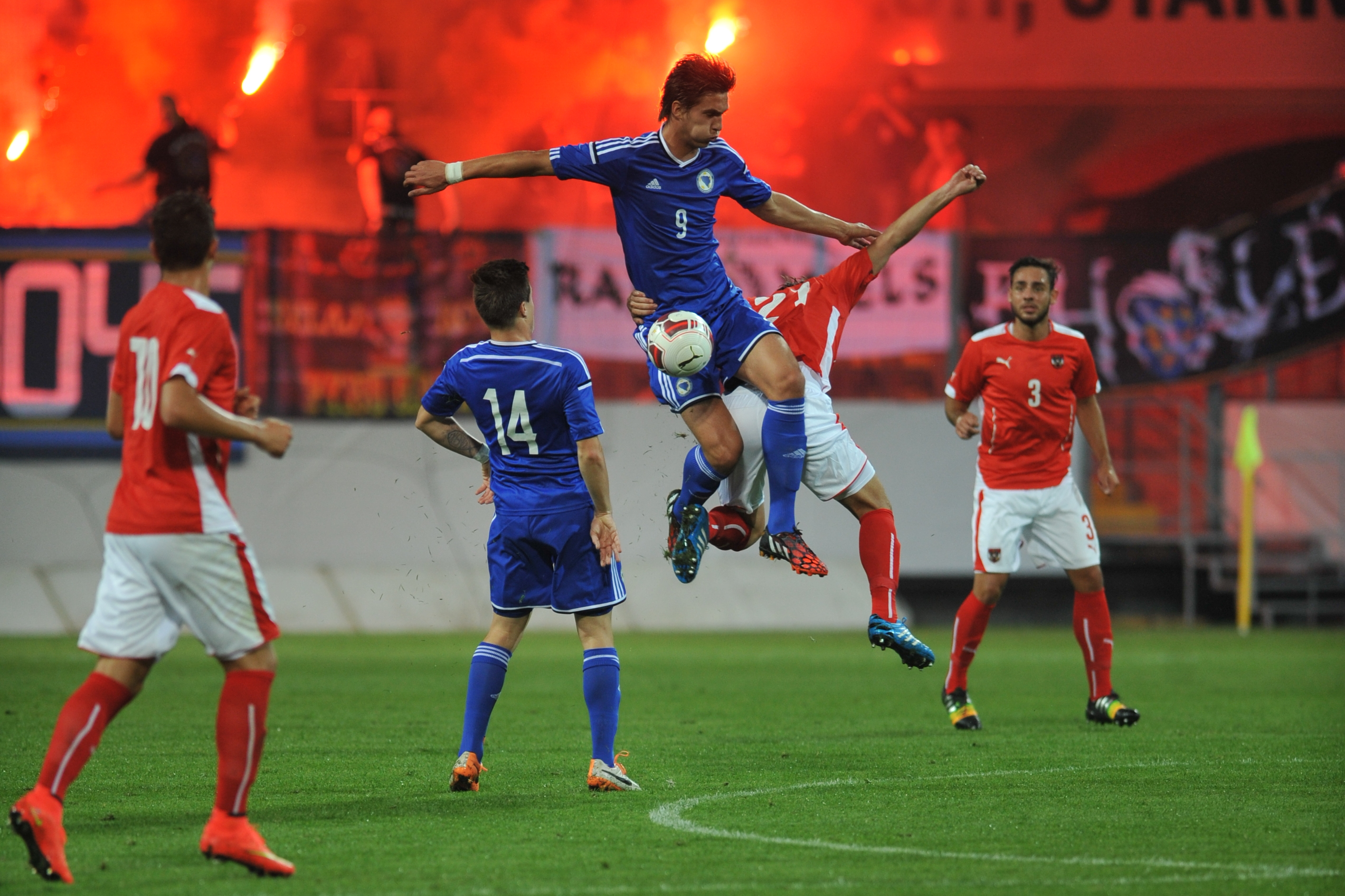
Maletić playing for the national under-21 team in 2014

Maletić played for the Bosnia and Herzegovina under-17 team at the 2010 European Under-17 Championship qualifying round. He scored a goal in this qualifying round on 30 September 2009 against Wales and reached the elite round of the competition. Maletić scored three goals for the Bosnia and Herzegovina under-19 team when he participated in the 2012 European Under-19 Championship qualification and elite round.

At the age of 18 Maletić was called for the first time into the Bosnia and Herzegovina national under-21 team for the last two matches of the 2013 European Under-21 Championship qualification Group 1 in September 2012. He made his debut for the Bosnia and Herzegovina under-21 team on 14 November 2012 against Poland. On 4 June 2013, he scored his first goal for the under-21 national team in friendly match against Serbia.

== Personal life ==
The parents of Marko and his older brother Stefan, who is also a footballer, are originally from Bijeljina in Bosnia and Herzegovina.
