= Hurka =

Hurka is a surname. Notable people with the surname include:

- Martin Hurka (born 1993), Czech footballer
- Mykhaylo Hurka (born 1975), Ukrainian footballer and manager
- Thomas Hurka (born 1952), Canadian philosopher

== See also ==
- Hůrka (Prague Metro)
