= Martin Geertsen =

Danish politician (born 1970)

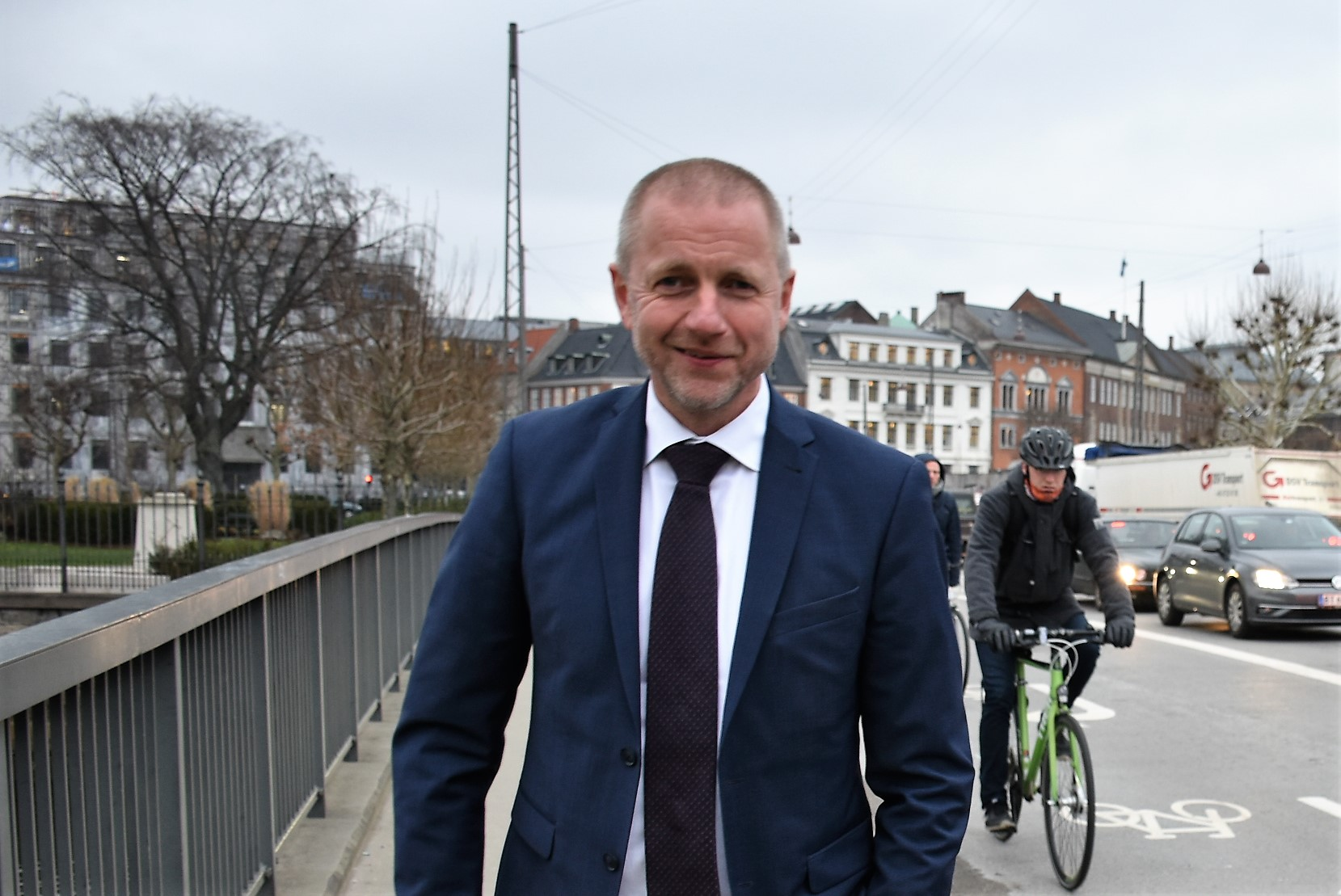
- Geertsen in 2019

Member of the Folketing
- Incumbent
- Assumed office 4 May 2018
- Constituency: Copenhagen
- In office 15 September 2011 – 18 June 2015
- Constituency: Copenhagen

Personal details
- Born: 16 March 1970 (age 56) Sakskøbing, Denmark
- Party: Venstre

Martin Raahauge Borreskov Geertsen (born 16 March 1970 in Sakskøbing) is a Danish politician, who is a member of the Folketing for the Venstre political party. He entered parliament in 2018 after Søren Pind resigned his seat. He was previously a member of parliament between 2011 and 2015. He is a former mayor of the Culture Committee in Copenhagen and former political leader of the Venstre party in Copenhagen.

== Political career ==
Martin Geertsen has been a member of Venstre, including its youth arm VU since 1987, and was the leader of the Falster branch of VU from 1989 to 1990. He started studying political science at the University of Copenhagen in 1991, from which he got his Bachelor of Arts degree. From 1993 to 1994 he was the leader of the Copenhagen branch of VU. From 1994 to 1996 he was a member of the national assembly of VU, and from 1995 to 1996 he was vice-president of the Danish national VU.

From 1998 to 2008 he was a member of the city council of Copenhagen, and was mayor of the Culture and Leisure Committee from 2002 to 2008. When Jens Rohde left the Folketing on 9 January 2007, Geertsen was the initial substitute to take over his seat, but he refused the seat due to his position of leading the Venstre party in Copenhagen, with the prospect of becoming the first Lord Mayor of Copenhagen ever to not belong to the Social Democratic Party. He has also been in the regional council of the Capital Region of Denmark since 2014.

Geertsen was first elected into parliament in the 2011 election, receiving 1,965 votes. Although not reelected in the 2015 election, he was the party's primary substitute in the constituency. This led him into Parliament on 4 May 2018 when Søren Pind resigned his seat. He was reelected into parliament in the 2019 election, receiving 2,404 votes.
