= Filip Raičević =

Montenegrin footballer (born 1993)

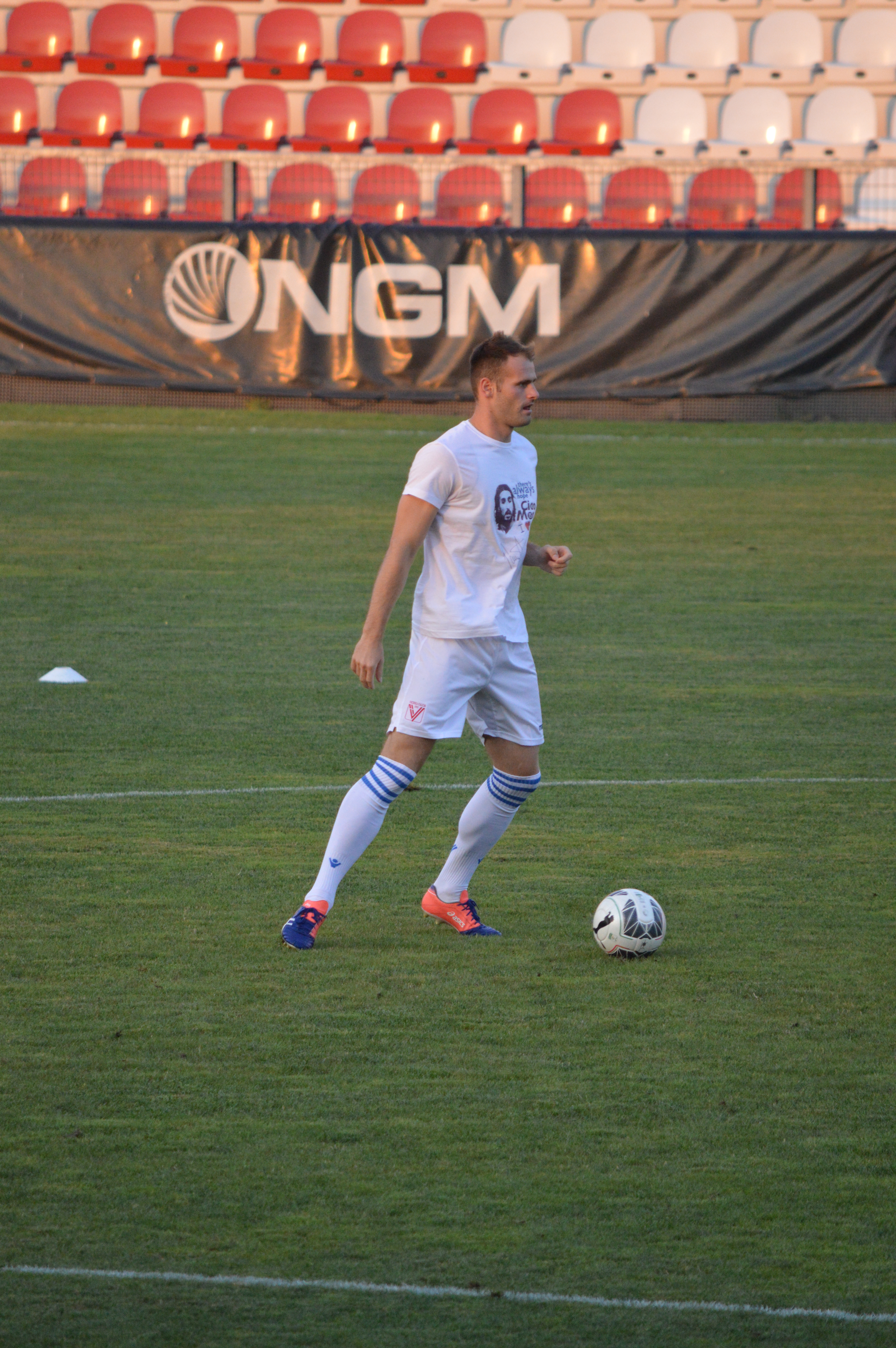
- Raičević in 2016

Personal information
- Date of birth: 2 July 1993 (age 33)
- Place of birth: Podgorica, FR Yugoslavia
- Height: 1.88 m (6 ft 2 in)
- Position: Forward

Team information
- Current team: Pistoiese
- Number: 13

Youth career
- 2008–2011: Partizan
- 2012–2013: Petrovac
- 2013–2014: Montegnée

Senior career*
Years	Team	Apps	(Gls)
2014–2015	Lucchese	26	(3)
2015–2017	Vicenza	50	(14)
2017	→ Bari (loan)	8	(0)
2017–2018	Bari	0	(0)
2017–2018	→ Pro Vercelli (loan)	34	(4)
2018–2021	Livorno	49	(6)
2020	→ Śląsk Wrocław (loan)	6	(1)
2020–2021	→ Ternana (loan)	27	(6)
2021–2022	Piacenza	19	(1)
2022–2023	Taranto	5	(0)
2023–2025	Bassano	48	(11)
2026–	Pistoiese	3	(0)

International career
2009	Montenegro U17	3	(1)
2016	Montenegro	3	(0)
- * Club domestic league appearances and goals as of 28 February 2026

Filip Raičević (Montenegrin: Филип Раичевић, pronounced [fǐlip raǐːtʃeʋitɕ]; born 2 July 1993) is a Montenegrin footballer who plays for Italian Serie D club Pistoiese.

Raičević also holds Belgian passport.

== Club career ==
Born in Podgorica, the capital of Montenegro, Raičević started his career at Serbian club FK Partizan.

=== Lucchese ===
Raičević was signed by Italian Serie D club Lucchese in February 2014. He followed the club promoted to 2014–15 Lega Pro.

=== Vicenza ===
Raičević was signed by Italian Serie B club Vicenza on 22 July 2015 for €50,000 transfer fee, in a 3-year contract, with Niko Bianconi moved to Lucchese in a temporary deal.

On 31 January 2017 Raičević and Cristian Galano were left for Bari in temporary deals from Vicenza, with an obligation to sign them outright. On the same day Giuseppe De Luca and Souleyman Doumbia moved to the Veneto-based club from Bari in temporary basis.

=== Livorno ===
==== Loan to Śląsk Wrocław ====
On 27 January 2020 he joined Polish club Śląsk Wrocław on loan until the end of the 2019–20 season.

==== Loan to Ternana ====
On 3 October 2020 he joined Ternana on loan with an option to buy.

=== Piacenza ===
On 4 November 2021, he signed a one-season deal with Piacenza.

== International career ==
Raičević was a player of Montenegro U17 in 2009–10 season. He scored once in 2010 UEFA European Under-17 Championship qualifying round, out of possible 3 matches. He received a call-up from Montenegro under-18 team in 2010–11 season.

He made his senior debut for Montenegro in a March 2016 friendly match against Greece and has, as of October 2020, earned a total of 3 caps, scoring no goals.
