= Michel Sorin =

French footballer (born 1961)

Personal information
- Date of birth: 18 September 1961 (age 65)
- Place of birth: Cossé-le-Vivien, France
- Height: 1.80 m (5 ft 11 in)
- Position: Defender

Team information
- Current team: Lyon Women (assistant)

Youth career
- Laval

Senior career*
Years	Team	Apps	(Gls)
1980–1986	Laval	153	(3)
1986–1989	Brest	108	(2)
1989–1995	Rennes	177	(6)
Total		438	(11)

Managerial career
- 1995–1997: Rennes II
- 2000–2001: US Changé
- 2001–2002: US Saint-Malo
- 2002–2007: Rennes (assistant)
- 2009–2010: Requins FC
- 2010: Benin
- 2011–2019: AS Vitré
- 2019–: Lyon Women (assistant)
- * Club domestic league appearances and goals

Michel Sorin (born 18 September 1961) is a French football manager and former player who is an assistant manager of Olympique Lyonnais Féminin. He managed the Benin national team and—from 2011 to 2019—was the head coach of AS Vitré.

== Personal life ==
Sorin was born in Cossé-le-Vivien. His sons Arthur Sorin and Eliott Sorin are also footballers and started their youth career at Rennes, where he used to play.
