= Arthur Sorin =

French footballer (born 1985)

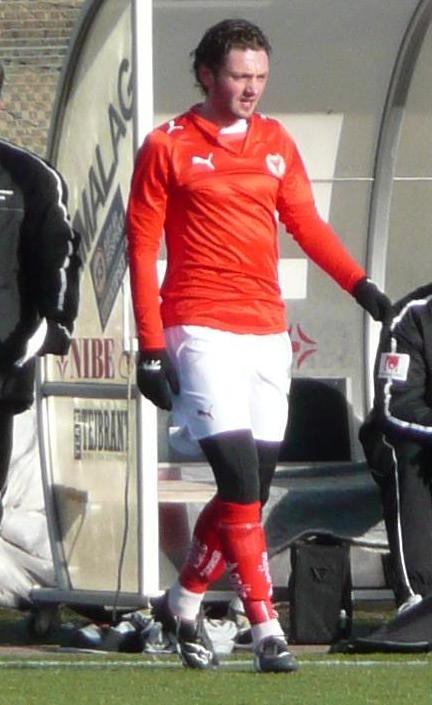

Personal information
- Date of birth: 1 November 1985 (age 41)
- Place of birth: Laval, France
- Height: 1.83 m (6 ft 0 in)
- Positions: Right-back; right midfielder

Youth career
- Rennes

Senior career*
Years	Team	Apps	(Gls)
2004–2005	Rennes B		
2005–2006	Rennes	0	(0)
2005–2006	→ Vannes (loan)	29	(1)
2007–2008	Kalmar	62	(1)
2009–2010	→ Sedan (loan)	3	(0)
2009–2015	AGF	101	(5)
2015–2020	AS Vitré	84	(5)
- * Club domestic league appearances and goals

Arthur Sorin (born 1 November 1985) is a French former professional footballer who normally played as a right-back, but could also play on the right side of midfield.

== Career ==
Born in Laval, Mayenne, Sorin starting playing for Stade Rennais F.C. but had a hard time to gain a position in the first squad. After a loan period at Vannes OC he was sold to Kalmar FF.

In the summer of 2008, Danish Superliga side AGF Aarhus made a bid for Sorin, but Kalmar FF refused to let him go in mid season, so though he signed a deal with AGF in July 2008, he was not able to join the club before his contract with Kalmar expired in January 2009. His contract with AGF was suspended 30 June. 2015.

== Personal life ==
His younger brother Eliott Sorin is also a professional footballer, while his father Michel Sorin is a former footballer and the current head coach of AS Vitré.

== Honours ==
Kalmar FF

- Allsvenskan: 2008
- Svenska Cupen: 2007

Individual

- Sorin was selected as the second best Full back (and the best right back) in the Swedish league 2008, by the big Swedish football website svenskafans.com.
