= František Jakubec =

Czech footballer (1956–2016)

Personal information
- Date of birth: 12 April 1956
- Place of birth: Český Brod, Czechoslovakia
- Date of death: 27 May 2016 (aged 60)
- Position: Defender

Youth career
- Sokol Vyšehořovice
- Bohemians Prague

Senior career*
Years	Team	Apps	(Gls)
1976–1978	VTJ Karlovy Vary		
1978–1986	Bohemians Prague	284	(19)
1987	Veria F.C.	14	(1)
1987–1989	AC Bellinzona	42	(0)
1989–1990	Bohemians Prague	5	(0)

International career
1981–1984	Czechoslovakia	25	(0)
- * Club domestic league appearances and goals

František Jakubec (12 April 1956 – 27 May 2016) was a Czech football player.

Jakubec played for Bohemians Prague for most of his career. He also had a spell with Veria in the Super League Greece.

He played for Czechoslovakia national football team (25 matches) and was a non-playing member of their squad at the 1982 FIFA World Cup.
