= Tomáš Kalán =

Czech footballer

Tomáš Kalan
Personal information
- Date of birth: 10 July 1973 (age 53)
- Position: Midfielder

Senior career*
Years	Team	Apps	(Gls)
–1991	Union Cheb		
1992	Slavia Praha		
1992–1993	Dukla Praha		
1993	Karlovy Vary		
1994–1997	Slavia Prague B		
1997–2000	Atlantic Lázně Bohdaneč		
2000–2001	Pardubice		
2001–2002	Spolana Neratovice		
- * Club domestic league appearances and goals

Tomáš Kalan (born 10 July 1973) is a retired Czech football midfielder.
