= Geertsen =

Geertsen is Danish patronymic surname from the given name Geert. Notable people with the surname include:

- Christopher Geertsen (born 1993), Danish footballer
- Ib Geertsen (1919–2009), Danish painter and sculptor
- Martin Geertsen (born 1970), Danish politician
- Mason Geertsen (born 1995), Canadian ice hockey player
- Nicolai Geertsen (born 1991), Danish footballer
