= Niko Bianconi =

Italian footballer

Personal information
- Date of birth: 10 October 1991 (age 35)
- Place of birth: Città di Castello, Italy
- Height: 1.80 m (5 ft 11 in)
- Position: Forward

Team information
- Current team: Varesina

Youth career
- Madonna del Latte
- 2004–2006: Tiferno Castello
- 2006–2009: Sansovino
- 2008–2009: → Vicenza (loan)
- 2009–2010: Vicenza
- 2010–2011: Juventus

Senior career*
Years	Team	Apps	(Gls)
2011–2014	Juventus	0	(0)
2011–2012	→ Vicenza (loan)	1	(0)
2012	→ Visé (loan)	3	(0)
2012–2013	→ Poggibonsi (loan)	14	(0)
2013–2014	→ Gavorrano (loan)	17	(1)
2014–2016	Vicenza	0	(0)
2015	→ Savona (loan)	3	(0)
2015–2016	→ Lucchese (loan)	18	(1)
2016	Caronnese	12	(0)
2016–2017	Verbania	20	(2)
2018	Sammaurese	6	(0)
2018–	Varesina		
- * Club domestic league appearances and goals

Niko Bianconi (born 10 October 1991) is an Italian footballer who plays as a forward for Varesina.

== Club career ==
Born in Città di Castello, Umbria, Bianconi started his career at hometown club G.S.D. Madonna del Latte and then U.S. Tiferno Castello Calcio. (not to be confused with A.C. Castello Calcio S.S.D., the Tiferno before WWII) He received a call-up to Umbria regional Allievi–Giovanissimi team for 2006 Coppa Nazionale Primavera, an event competed by the representative teams of Italian regions.

Bianconi then left for Sansovino. In 2006–07 season Bianconi was a member of Allievi Regionali U-16 team and played the match against Empoli, in a friendly event, 2007 Torneo Internazionale Colli Senesi. Bianconi played for Sansovino U-20 team in 2008 Torneo di Viareggio which he was promoted from the U-17 team Allievi Nazionali.

=== Vicenza ===
On 1 September 2008 he was signed by Serie B club Vicenza, initially on a temporary deal. Bianconi played 2 seasons in the Primavera U-20 team. He scored 10 goals in 2009–10 season as Vicenza Primavera team top-scorer.

=== Juventus ===
In July 2010 Bianconi was signed by Serie A club Juventus on a 5-year contract on a co-ownership deal. The club swapped Bianconi with Fausto Rossi. Both players were valued €1 million at that time thus 50% registration rights worth €500,000.

Bianconi scored a hat-trick in 2011 Torneo di Viareggio, which he became the top-scorer of Juve in that tournament with only 3 goals.

In July 2011 Bianconi returned to Vicenza. Bianconi wore No.97 shirt.

However, after only 1 appearance in half-season for the first team (and 6 more for the U20 team as one of the four born 1991 overage player in Campionato Nazionale Primavera), Bianconi left for Belgian club Visé, wearing No.45 shirt.

In August 2012, he was loaned to Lega Pro Seconda Divisione side Poggibonsi.

On 28 August 2013 Bianconi moved to Gavorrano. He fail to score regularly with only 5 starts. He rarely played in the second half of season, after the club signed Simone Malatesta and Francesco Zizzari as forwards.

=== Vicenza return ===
On 20 June 2014 Vicenza bought back Bianconi for €600,000, with Carlo Pinsoglio return to Turin on the same day, for €700,000. He was awarded No.17 shirt. Bianconi signed a 3-year deal.

On 5 January 2015 he was signed by Savona on a temporary deal.

On 22 July 2015 Bianconi was signed by Lucchese on a temporary deal, as part of the deal of Filip Raičević.

=== Amateur career ===
Circa July 2016 he was released by Vicenza. He joined Caronnese and made his debut against Ciserano. In December 2016 he left the club. He then played for Verbania and Sammaurese.

In September 2018 he was signed by Eccellenza Lombardy club Varesina.
