= VTJ Karlovy Vary =

VTJ Karlovy Vary was a football club in Karlovy Vary, Czech Republic.

In 1995 the club was incorporated into SK Slavia Karlovy Vary. Its last placement was 13th in the 1994–95 Bohemian Football League.

== Historical names ==
- 1951 — Krušnohor Karlovy Vary
- 1953 — PDA Karlovy Vary
- 1965 — VTJ Dukla Karlovy Vary
- 1976 — VTJ Karlovy Vary

== Players ==
- Josef Csaplár
- Milan Fukal
- Martin Frýdek
- František Jakubec
- Aleš Jindra
- Tomáš Kalán
- Pavel Lukáš
- René Twardzik
- Ivo Ulich
- Jan Velkoborský
- Petr Vlček
