= 2010 UEFA European Under-17 Championship =

U-17-Fußball-Europameisterschaft 2010

Tournament details
- Host country: Liechtenstein
- Dates: 18–30 May
- Teams: 8 (from 1 confederation)
- Venue: 2 (in 2 host cities)

Final positions
- Champions: England (1st title)
- Runners-up: Spain

Tournament statistics
- Matches played: 15
- Goals scored: 41 (2.73 per match)
- Attendance: 20,268 (1,351 per match)
- Top scorer: (Spain) Paco Alcácer (6 goals)
- Best player: (England) Connor Wickham

The 2010 UEFA European Under-17 Championship was the ninth edition of UEFA's European Under-17 Football Championship, held in Liechtenstein from 18 to 30 May 2010. The hosts decided not to field a team, fearing it would not be competitive enough for the tournament's prestige; their place was occupied by France, the best runner-up in the qualification's elite round. Germany was the 2009 title holder, but failed to qualify. In the final, England defeated Spain by 2–1, and achieved their first ever under-17 European title.

== Qualification ==
The final tournament of the 2010 UEFA European Under-17 Championship was preceded by two qualification stages: a qualifying round and an Elite round. During these rounds, 52 national teams competed to determine the eight teams.

== Participants ==
- Czech Republic
- England
- France
- Greece
- Portugal
- Spain
- Switzerland
- Turkey

Despite being hosts, Liechtenstein did not participate in the finals. They withdrew from the competition after raising concerns with UEFA that their U-17 side would not be competitive, and devalue the tournament.

== Match officials ==
A total of six referees, eight assistant referees and two fourth officials were appointed for the final tournament.

Referees

- (Latvia) Vadims Direktorenko
- (Kazakhstan) Artyom Kuchin
- (Finland) Antti Munukka
- (Scotland) Euan Norris
- (Bulgaria) Stanislav Todorov
- (Belgium) Christof Virant

Assistant referees

- (Netherlands) Angelo Boonman
- (Austria) Roland Brandner
- (Azerbaijan) Orkhan Mammadov
- (Norway) Sven Erik Midthjell
- (Montenegro) Nikola Razic
- (Luxembourg) Marco Tropeano
- (Hungary) Laszlo Viszokai
- (Slovenia) Matej Zunic

Fourth officials

- (Switzerland) Alain Bieri
- (Switzerland) Stephan Klossner

The match officials were observed by Markus Nobs and Andreas Schluchter from Switzerland.

== Group stage ==
=== Group A ===
| Team | Pld | W | D | L | GF | GA | GD | Pts |
|---|---|---|---|---|---|---|---|---|
| Spain | 3 | 3 | 0 | 0 | 8 | 1 | +7 | 9 |
| France | 3 | 2 | 0 | 1 | 5 | 3 | +2 | 6 |
| Portugal | 3 | 1 | 0 | 2 | 3 | 3 | 0 | 3 |
| Switzerland | 3 | 0 | 0 | 3 | 1 | 10 | −9 | 0 |

18 May 2010
17:30 CEST

| France | 1–2 | Spain |
|---|---|---|
| Koura 66' | Report | Bernat 24'; Alcácer 75' |

Rheinpark Stadion, Vaduz
Attendance: 565
Referee: Euan Norris (Scotland)
18 May 2010
17:30 CEST

| Portugal | 3–0 | Switzerland |
|---|---|---|
| Esgaio 25', 50'; Fonseca 48' | Report |

Sportpark Eschen-Mauren, Eschen
Attendance: 1,400
Referee: Artyom Kuchin (Kazakhstan)

21 May 2010
17:00 CEST

| Spain | 4–0 | Switzerland |
|---|---|---|
| Alcácer 13', 36', 43'; Ortí 48' | Report |

Rheinpark Stadion, Vaduz
Attendance: 2,175
Referee: Antti Munukka (Finland)
21 May 2010
20:00 CEST

| France | 1–0 | Portugal |
|---|---|---|
| Pogba 29' | Report |

Sportpark Eschen-Mauren, Eschen
Attendance: 848
Referee: Christof Virant (Belgium)

24 May 2010
17:00 CEST

| Switzerland | 1–3 | France |
|---|---|---|
| Žarković 29' | Report | Sanogo 43', 47'; Koura 64' |

Sportpark Eschen-Mauren, Eschen
Attendance: 1,340
Referee: Vadims Direktorenko (Latvia)
24 May 2010
17:00 CEST

| Spain | 2–0 | Portugal |
|---|---|---|
| Deulofeu 70', 74' | Report |

Rheinpark Stadion, Vaduz
Attendance: 1,965
Referee: Stanislav Todorov (Bulgaria)

=== Group B ===
| Team | Pld | W | D | L | GF | GA | GD | Pts |
|---|---|---|---|---|---|---|---|---|
| England | 3 | 3 | 0 | 0 | 6 | 2 | +4 | 9 |
| Turkey | 3 | 1 | 1 | 1 | 5 | 4 | +1 | 4 |
| Czech Republic | 3 | 0 | 2 | 1 | 2 | 4 | −2 | 2 |
| Greece | 3 | 0 | 1 | 2 | 1 | 4 | −3 | 1 |

18 May 2010
20:30 CEST

| Greece | 1–3 | Turkey |
|---|---|---|
| Diamantakos 62' (pen.) | Report | Yokuşlu 16'; Akçakın 60', 90+3' (pen.) |

Sportpark Eschen-Mauren, Eschen
Attendance: 700
Referee: Christof Virant (Belgium)
18 May 2010
20:30 CEST

| England | 3–1 | Czech Republic |
|---|---|---|
| Barkley 21'; McEachran 68'; Afobe 69' | Report | Plšek 7' |

Rheinpark Stadion, Vaduz
Attendance: 550
Referee: Stanislav Todorov (Bulgaria)

21 May 2010
17:00 CEST

| Turkey | 1–1 | Czech Republic |
|---|---|---|
| Akçakın 43' | Report | Haša 70' |

Sportpark Eschen-Mauren, Eschen
Attendance: 1,016
Referee: Vadims Direktorenko (Latvia)
21 May 2010
20:00 CEST

| Greece | 0–1 | England |
|---|---|---|
| | Report | Barkley 35' |

Rheinpark Stadion, Vaduz
Attendance: 665
Referee: Artyom Kuchin (Kazakhstan)

24 May 2010
20:00 CEST

| Czech Republic | 0–0 | Greece |
|---|---|---|
| | Report |

Sportpark Eschen-Mauren, Eschen
Attendance: 384
Referee: Euan Norris (Scotland)
24 May 2010
20:00 CEST

| Turkey | 1–2 | England |
|---|---|---|
| Derici 31' | Report | Berahino 35'; Hall 62' (pen.) |

Rheinpark Stadion, Vaduz
Attendance: 1,630
Referee: Antti Munukka (Finland)

== Knockout stage ==
=== Bracket ===
Semi-finals
27 May
England | 2
France | 1
27 May
Spain | 3
Turkey | 1

Final
30 May
England | 2
Spain | 1

=== Semi-finals ===
27 May 2010
16:00 CEST

| England | 2–1 | France |
|---|---|---|
| Wickham 23', 40' | Report | Pogba 56' |

Rheinpark Stadion, Vaduz
Attendance: 1,100
Referee: Stanislav Todorov (Bulgaria)

27 May 2010
20:00 CEST

| Spain | 3–1 | Turkey |
|---|---|---|
| Jesé 11'; Alcácer 63', 66' (pen.) | Report | Çalış 47' |

Rheinpark Stadion, Vaduz
Attendance: 1,940
Referee: Antti Munukka (Finland)

=== Final ===
30 May 2010
17:30 CEST

| England | 2–1 | Spain |
|---|---|---|
| Wisdom 30'; Wickham 42' | Report | Deulofeu 22' |

Rheinpark Stadion, Vaduz
Attendance: 3,990
Referee: Antti Munukka (Finland)

== Goalscorers ==
6 goals

- (Spain) Paco Alcácer

3 goals

- (England) Connor Wickham
- (Spain) Gerard Deulofeu
- (Turkey) Artun Akçakın

2 goals

- (England) Ross Barkley
- (France) Anthony Koura
- (France) Paul Pogba
- (France) Yaya Sanogo
- (Portugal) Ricardo Esgaio

1 goal

- (Czech Republic) Roman Haša
- (Czech Republic) Jakub Plšek
- (England) Benik Afobe
- (England) Saido Berahino
- (England) Robert Hall
- (England) Joshua McEachran
- (England) Andre Wisdom
- (Greece) Dimitrios Diamantakos
- (Portugal) Mateus Fonseca
- (Spain) Juan Bernat
- (Spain) Jorge Ortí Gracia
- (Spain) Jesé
- (Switzerland) Aleksandar Žarković
- (Turkey) Taşkın Çalış
- (Turkey) Okan Derici
- (Turkey) Okay Yokuşlu

== Technical team selection ==
Goalkeepers

- (England) 13. Jack Butland
- (Spain) 13. Adrián Ortolá

Defenders

- (Spain) 5. Víctor Álvarez
- (England) 3. Luke Garbutt
- (Czech Republic) 2. Tomáš Kalas
- (France) 2. Youssouf Sabaly
- (Czech Republic) 14. Filip Twardzik
- (England) 6. Andre Wisdom

Midfielders

- (England) 16. Ross Barkley
- (Spain) 8. José Campaña
- (England) 4. Conor Coady
- (Portugal) 8. João Mário
- (England) 15. Josh McEachran
- (Czech Republic) 5. Jakub Plšek
- (France) 6. Paul Pogba
- (France) 15. Eliott Sorin

Attackers

- (England) 9. Benik Afobe
- (Spain) 9. Paco Alcácer
- (Spain) 17. Gerard Deulofeu
- (Spain) 7. Jesé
- (France) 9. Yaya Sanogo
- (England) 17. Connor Wickham
