= Aleš Jindra =

Czech footballer and coach

Personal information
- Date of birth: 12 June 1973 (age 53)
- Place of birth: Plzeň, Czechoslovakia
- Position: Defensive midfielder

Youth career
- 1979–1993: FC Viktoria Plzeň

Senior career*
| Years | Team | Apps | (Gls) |
| 1993–1994 | VTJ Karlovy Vary | – | (–) |
| 1994–1995 | FC Viktoria Plzeň | 3 | (0) |
| 1995–1999 | Chmel Blšany | 94 | (4) |
| 1999–2000 | FC Viktoria Plzeň | 35 | (8) |
| 2001 | FK AS Pardubice | 14 | (1) |
| 2001–2002 | FC Augsburg | 26 | (1) |
| 2007 | SV Etzenricht | 16 | (3) |

Managerial career
- 2008: FK Baník Sokolov (assistant coach)
- 2009: CFR Cluj (assistant coach)
- 2010–2011: Sparta Prague (assistant coach)
- 2012–2017: FK Baník Sokolov
- * Club domestic league appearances and goals

Aleš Jindra (born 12 June 1973) is a Czech football coach and a former football player.

Before moving to Romania, he was the assistant coach of the Czech 2. Liga team FK Baník Sokolov.
