= Vlastimil Veselý =

Czech footballer

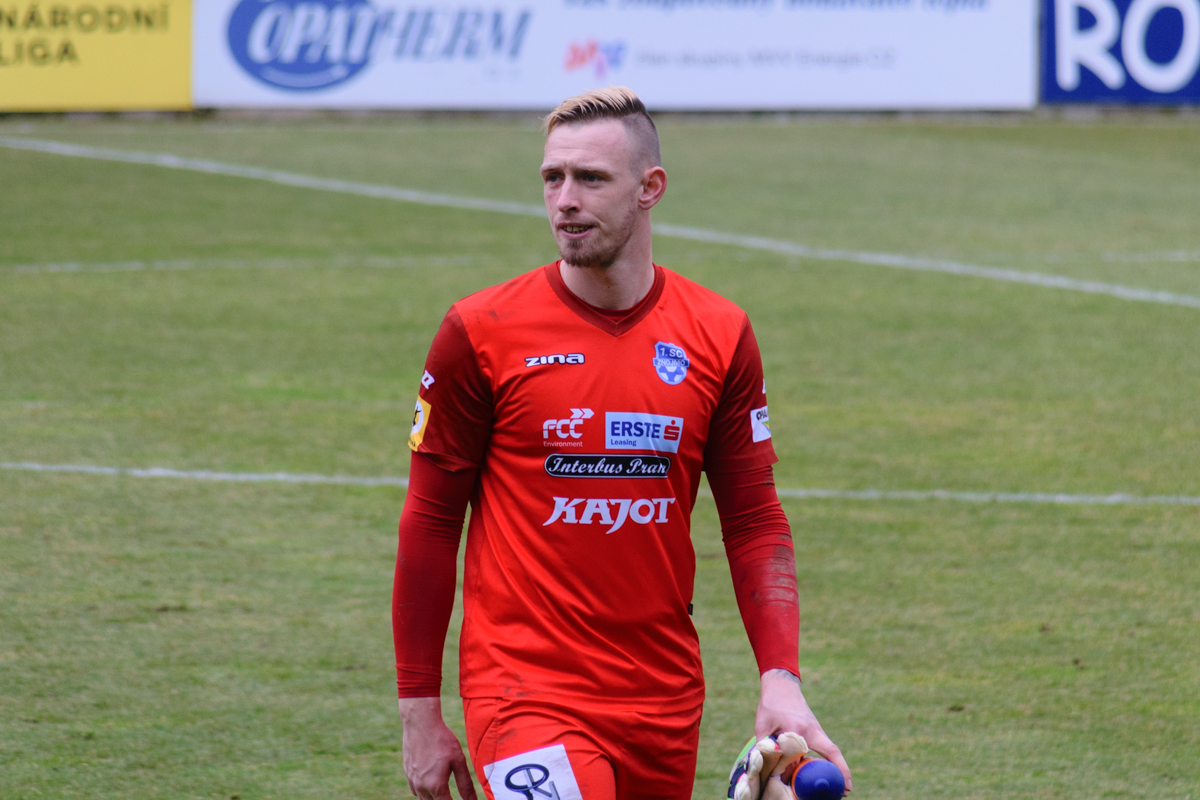

Personal information
- Date of birth: 6 May 1993 (age 33)
- Place of birth: Brno, Czech Republic
- Height: 1.87 m (6 ft 1 1/2 in)
- Position: Goalkeeper

Team information
- Current team: SK Líšeň
- Number: 93

Youth career
- 2001−2012: FC Zbrojovka Brno

Senior career*
Years	Team	Apps	(Gls)
2012	Brno B	5	(0)
2012−2016	Brno U-21	49	(0)
2012−2014	→ SK Líšeň (loan)	15	(0)
2015−2016	→ Znojmo (loan)	21	(0)
2016−2017	Brno	1	(0)
2017−2019	Znojmo	28	(0)
2019	→ Jihlava (loan)	3	(0)
2019−2020	Jihlava	1	(0)
2020−	SK Líšeň	59	(0)

International career
2008−2009	Czech Republic U16	6	(0)
2009−2010	Czech Republic U17	12	(0)
2009−2011	Czech Republic U18	6	(0)
2011−2012	Czech Republic U19	6	(0)
2012	Czech Republic U21	1	(0)
- * Club domestic league appearances and goals as of 25 January 2024

Vlastimil Veselý (born 6 May 1993 in Brno) is a Czech football player who currently plays for SK Líšeň in the Czech National Football League.
