= Alvin Arrondel =

French professional footballer (born 1993)

Personal information
- Full name: Alvin Arrondel
- Date of birth: 11 November 1993 (age 33)
- Place of birth: Pontoise, France
- Height: 1.80 m (5 ft 11 in)
- Position: Defender

Youth career
- 1999–2007: Osny FC
- 2007–2008: L'Entente SSG
- 2008–2011: Paris Saint-Germain

Senior career*
Years	Team	Apps	(Gls)
2011–2014	Paris Saint-Germain II	57	(1)
2014–2017	Vitória de Guimarães B	64	(1)
2015–2017	Vitória de Guimarães	6	(0)
2016–2017	→ Portimonense (loan)	4	(0)

International career^{‡}
2009–2010	France U17	11	(0)
2010–2011	France U18	9	(0)
- * Club domestic league appearances and goals as of 6 November 2016 ‡ National team caps and goals as of 16:49, 26 November 2014 (UTC)

Alvin Arrondel (born 11 November 1993) is a French professional footballer who plays as a defender.

== Club career ==
Arrondel signed for the PSG academy in the 2008/09 season.

In July 2013, Alvin has signed his first professional contract with PSG for one year.

In 2014, his contract expired and he was linked with a move to Creteil.

On 1 August 2014, Arrondel signed for Vitória Guimarães of Portugal with his two agents Jeremie Fhima and Guido Boccara, penning a three-year contract.

During the 2016 summer window, he joined Portimonense for a one year loan.
