= René Twardzik =

Czech footballer and coach

Personal information
- Date of birth: 25 June 1970 (age 56)
- Place of birth: Třinec, Czechoslovakia
- Position: Goalkeeper

Youth career
- 1978–1986: TZ Třinec

Senior career*
| Years | Team | Apps | (Gls) |
| 1986–1987 | TZ Třinec | 1 | (0) |
| 1987–1988 | Slavia Prague | 0 | (0) |
| 1988–1989 | VTJ Tábor | 16 | (0) |
| 1989–1990 | VTJ Karlovy Vary | 0 | (0) |
| 1990–1992 | TZ Třinec | 0 | (0) |
| 1992–1994 | Boby Brno | 46 | (0) |
| 1994–1996 | FC Vítkovice | 8 | (0) |
| 1996–1999 | Opava | 86 | (0) |
| 1999–2001 | Sachsen Leipzig | 69 | (0) |
| 2001–2005 | Rot-Weiß Erfurt | 124 | (0) |
| 2005–2008 | Sachsen Leipzig | 56 | (0) |
| 2018 | Rot-Weiß Erfurt | 0 | (0) |
| Total | | 406 | (0) |

International career
| | Czechoslovakia U21 | 4 | (0) |
- * Club domestic league appearances and goals

René Twardzik (born 25 June 1970) is a Czech former professional footballer who played as a goalkeeper.

== Playing career ==
Born in Třinec, Twardzik played for TZ Třinec, Slavia Prague, VTJ Tábor, VTJ Karlovy Vary, Boby Brno, FC Vítkovice, Opava, Sachsen Leipzig and Rot-Weiß Erfurt. He played four matches for Czechoslovakia U21.

== Coaching career ==
Twardzik became the goalkeeping coach of Rot-Weiß Erfurt in July 2010. From September 2018 to November 2018, he sat on the bench for Rot-Weiß Erfurt for five games due to injuries. At the end of January 2020, the club ceased operations due to financial difficulties, and as a result, withdrew from the Regionalliga Nordost. The day after, he was released by the club.

== Personal life ==
His sons Dan, Filip and Patrik are also all professional footballers. As of 2014 he has lived in Germany for 15 years.
