= Dan Twardzik =

German footballer (born 1991)

Personal information
- Date of birth: 13 April 1991 (age 35)
- Place of birth: Třinec, CSFR
- Height: 1.83 m (6 ft 0 in)
- Position: Goalkeeper

Youth career
- Bayern Munich

Senior career*
Years	Team	Apps	(Gls)
2009–2011	Karlsruher SC II	22	(0)
2011–2013	Como	0	(0)
2013	Aberdeen	0	(0)
2013–2014	Dundee	2	(0)
2013–2014	→ Motherwell (loan)	5	(0)
2014–2016	Motherwell	25	(0)
2018–2022	VSG Altglienicke	69	(0)
Total		123	(0)

International career
2008	Germany U17	1	(0)
2008	Germany U18	2	(0)
- * Club domestic league appearances and goals

Dan Twardzik (born 13 April 1991) is a former professional footballer who played as a goalkeeper.

== Club career ==
Twardzik trained with Bayern Munich as a youngster, and after leaving the German giants in 2009, trained with Scottish club Motherwell. Compensation issues were to kill off any possibility of a move to Fir Park, so he signed on at Karlsruher SC. In 2011, he moved to Italian football with Calcio Como.

Having struggled to make an impact in Italy, Twardzik was recruited by Scottish club Aberdeen. He did not make a single appearance for the Pittodrie club, as he was used mostly as a back-up to Jamie Langfield and he was released at the end of the 2012–13 season.

The following season, Twardzik moved down a division and signed for relegated club Dundee. Again, he found first-team opportunities very hard to come by.

With both Lee Hollis and Gunnar Nielsen out injured, Twardzik went on an emergency one-month loan to Motherwell. He made his debut, and indeed his first ever appearance in Scottish football, in a 2–1 win away to Ross County. He made five appearances for the club. Twardzik returned to Dundee when his loan spell had expired, with Motherwell attempting to extend the loan, however this did not happen.

After making his return, Twardzik made his debut for Dundee on 25 January 2014, coming on as a substitute against Falkirk, after first choice goalkeeper Kyle Letheren had been sent off. He immediately saved a penalty but could not stop Dundee losing 2–0. After spending the remainder of the season as back-up for Letheren, Twardzik's futures appeared to be uncertain following the club's promotion to the Scottish Premiership. At the end of the season it was confirmed Twardzik would be leaving the club.

On 23 May 2014, Twardzik returned to Motherwell, signing a two-year contract. Following the move, he said he aimed to become the first choice goalkeeper at the club. Twardzik made his second debut for Motherwell, in the Europa League second qualifying round first leg, in a 2–2 draw against Icelandic side Stjarnan. However, in the return leg, he came under criticism when he allowed the opposition team to take the lead in extra time, with the match finishing in a 3–2 victory for Stjarnan, eliminating Motherwell. Twardzik started in goal, in the opening game of the league season, in a 1–0 win over St Mirren. Since making his debut, Twardzik became the first choice goalkeeper, with manager Stuart McCall showing faith in him.

On 26 January 2016, Twardzik left Motherwell by mutual consent.

== International career ==
Despite being of Czech origin, Twardzik also claims German nationality. In 2008, he made two appearances for the Germany under-18 team, and one for the Germany under-17 team.

== Personal life ==
Twardzik is an older brother to former Celtic twins Filip and Patrik. His father René also played as a goalkeeper. Twardzik speaks five languages and is a fan of travelling.
