= Bilal Gülden =

Turkish footballer

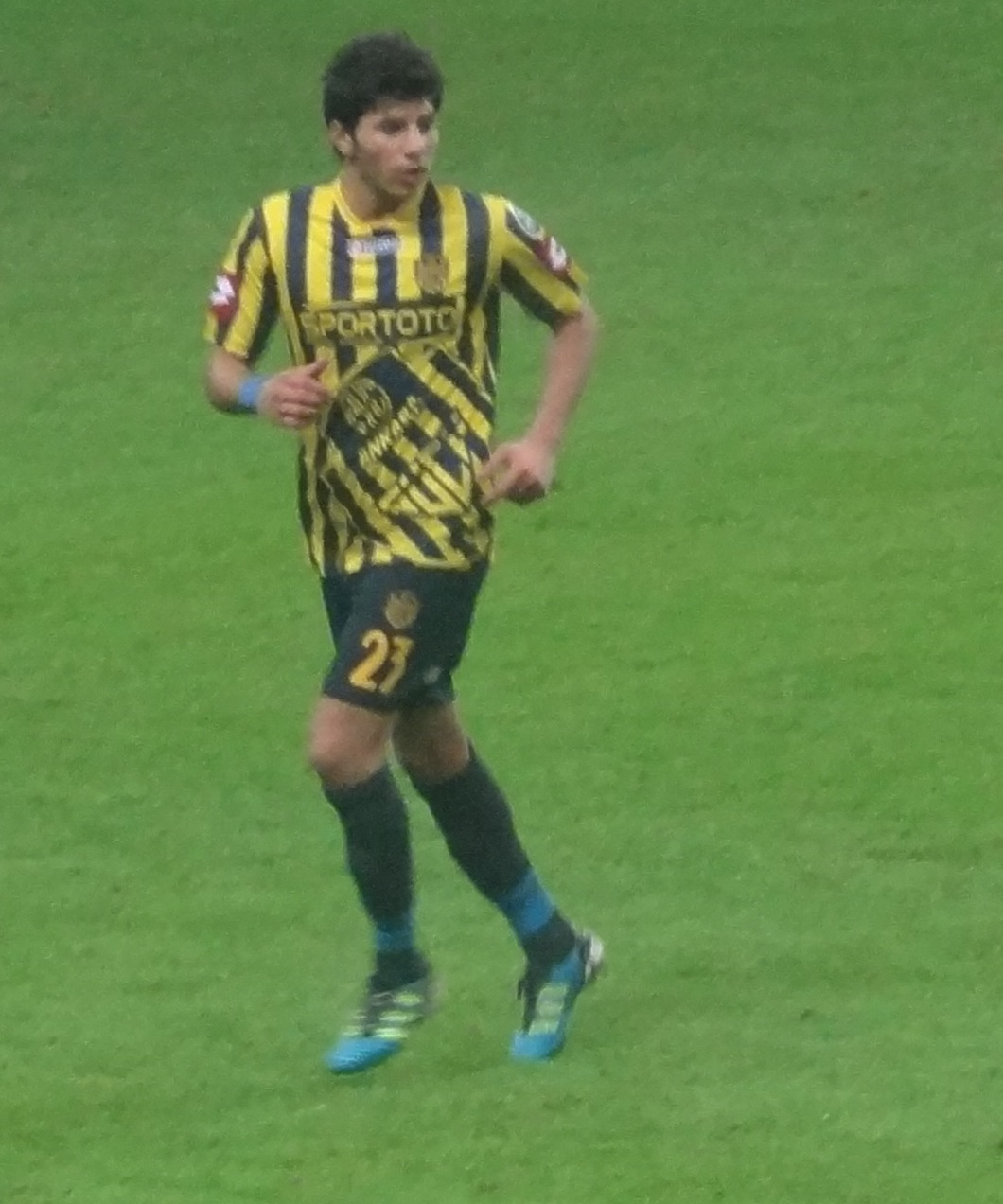

Personal information
- Date of birth: 1 May 1993 (age 33)
- Place of birth: Mannheim, Germany
- Height: 1.85 m (6 ft 1 in)
- Position: Midfielder

Team information
- Current team: Kepez Spor Futbol
- Number: 8

Senior career*
Years	Team	Apps	(Gls)
2010–2013	Ankaragücü	52	(2)
2013–2014	Kayserispor	0	(0)
2014	→ Adana Demirspor (loan)	11	(1)
2014–2015	Boluspor	28	(0)
2016–2018	Eyüpspor	58	(6)
2018–2019	Samsunspor	0	(0)
2018–2019	→ Tokatspor (loan)	25	(5)
2019–2020	Bayburt Özel İdarespor	26	(2)
2020–2021	Kırşehir Belediyespor	17	(0)
2021	Düzcespor	16	(1)
2021–2022	Orduspor	27	(3)
2022–2023	TSG Weinheim	11	(0)
2023	Orduspor	14	(4)
2023–	Kepez Spor Futbol	2	(0)

International career
2009	Turkey U16	10	(2)
2009–2010	Turkey U17	18	(0)
2010–2011	Turkey U18	7	(1)
2012	Turkey U19	2	(0)
- * Club domestic league appearances and goals as of 17 September 2023

Bilal Gülden (born 1 May 1993) is a Turkish footballer who plays as a midfielder for TFF Third League club Kepez Spor Futbol.

He made his Süper Lig debut for Ankaragücü on 21 May 2011.
