= Valmir Seferi =

Finnish footballer (born 1993)

Personal information
- Date of birth: 18 February 1993 (age 33)
- Place of birth: Karkkila, Finland
- Height: 1.78 m (5 ft 10 in)
- Position: Midfielder

Team information
- Current team: LoPa

Youth career
- EBK
- FC Honka

Senior career*
Years	Team	Apps	(Gls)
2009–2010	Pallohonka II	38	(7)
2010–2012	FC Honka	1	(0)
2012	→ Pallohonka II (dual registration)	7	(1)
2012	PK-35	4	(0)
2013	LoPa	14	(6)
2014–	FC Viikingit	0	(0)

International career
- Finland U-16
2009–2010	Finland U-17	25	(5)
2010–2011	Finland U-18	15	(4)
- Finland U-19
- * Club domestic league appearances and goals as of 2 May 2013

Valmir Seferi (born 18 February 1993) is a Finnish football player currently playing for Finnish Kakkonen side Lohjan Pallo.
