= Marek Krátký =

Czech footballer (born 1993)

Personal information
- Date of birth: 8 June 1993 (age 33)
- Place of birth: Kadaň, Czech Republic
- Height: 1.79 m (5 ft 10 in)
- Position: Right back

Team information
- Current team: Sokol Brozany
- Number: 8

Youth career
- Teplice

Senior career*
Years	Team	Apps	(Gls)
2010–2016	Teplice	14	(0)
2014	→ Sparta Prague (loan)	0	(0)
2014–2015	→ Ústí nad Labem (loan)	24	(1)
2016–2018	Hradec Králové	31	(4)
2018–2020	Ústí nad Labem	44	(2)
2020	→ Baník Sokolov (loan)	11	(2)
2020–	Sokol Brozany	8	(0)

International career
2008–2009	Czech Republic U-16	13	(0)
2009–2010	Czech Republic U-17	17	(3)
2010–2011	Czech Republic U-18	9	(0)
2011–2012	Czech Republic U-19	10	(0)
2013	Czech Republic U-21	4	(0)
- * Club domestic league appearances and goals as of 18:52, 21 February 2021 (UTC)

Marek Krátký (born 8 June 1993) is a Czech football player who currently plays for SK Sokol Brozany. He has represented his country at youth international level.
