= Eliott Sorin =

French footballer (born 1993)

- Sorin with Rennes B in 2011

Personal information
- Date of birth: 1 March 1993 (age 33)
- Place of birth: Rennes, France
- Height: 1.78 m (5 ft 10 in)
- Position: Midfielder

Team information
- Current team: AS Vitré
- Number: 6

Youth career
- 1999–2010: Rennes

Senior career*
Years	Team	Apps	(Gls)
2010–2013	Rennes B	16	(0)
2013	Helsingborgs IF Akademi		
2013–2015	Dijon B	40	(7)
2014–2015	Dijon	2	(0)
2016–	AS Vitré	180	(12)

International career
2009–2010	France U17	19	(0)
2010	France U18	6	(1)
- * Club domestic league appearances and goals as of 1 June 2023

Eliott Sorin (born 1 March 1993) is a French footballer who plays as a midfielder for AS Vitré.

== Career ==
Sorin was part of the Rennes youth setup from age of six. He progressed through the levels, joining the training centre, and made his debut with the B team in 2010, before signing a trainee contract. Unable to secure a professional contract with the club, he spend a few weeks in Sweden with Helsingborgs IF Akademi before signing with Dijon FCO at the start of the 2013–14 season. Released after two seasons, he signed for AS Vitré in June 2015.

== Personal life ==
Eliot is brother of Arthur Sorin and son of Michel Sorin, who coached him at AS Vitré when he first joined the club.
