= Christopher Geertsen =

Danish footballer (born 1993)

Personal information
- Full name: Christopher Geertsen
- Date of birth: 24 January 1993 (age 33)
- Place of birth: Randers, Denmark
- Height: 1.77 m (5 ft 9 1/2 in)
- Position: Midfielder

Team information
- Current team: Brabrand IF
- Number: 11

Youth career
- Helsted-Fremad IF
- Randers Freja

Senior career*
Years	Team	Apps	(Gls)
2012–2013	Randers FC	2	(0)
2013–2015	FC Fredericia	50	(0)
2015–	Brabrand IF	0	(0)

International career
	Denmark U-16	2	(0)
	Denmark U-17	11	(3)
	Denmark U-18	6	(0)
	Denmark U-19	3	(0)
- * Club domestic league appearances and goals as of 16 February 2015

Christopher Geertsen (born 24 January 1993) is a Danish footballer who currently plays as a midfielder for Brabrand IF.
