= Mateus Fonseca =

Portuguese footballer

Personal information
- Full name: Mateus Borges da Fonseca
- Date of birth: 10 May 1993 (age 33)
- Place of birth: Almada, Portugal
- Height: 1.79 m (5 ft 10 1/2 in)
- Position: Attacking midfielder

Team information
- Current team: Casa Pia
- Number: 23

Youth career
- 2002–2012: Sporting

Senior career*
Years	Team	Apps	(Gls)
2012–2013	FC Chiasso	6	(0)
2013–2015	Trofense	40	(4)
2015–2016	Pinhalnovense	22	(0)
2016–	Casa Pia	16	(1)

International career^{‡}
2008	Portugal U15	2	(2)
2008–2009	Portugal U16	8	(2)
2009–2010	Portugal U17	17	(2)
2010–2011	Portugal U18	4	(1)
- * Club domestic league appearances and goals as of 9 April 2017 ‡ National team caps and goals as of 7 April 2011

Mateus Borges da Fonseca (born 10 May 1993) is a Portuguese footballer who plays for Casa Pia, as a midfielder.

== Football career ==
On 11 August 2012, Fonseca made his professional debut with FC Chiasso in a 2012–13 Swiss Challenge League match against FC Wohlen.
