= Martin Hurka =

Czech footballer

Personal information
- Date of birth: 20 April 1993 (age 33)
- Place of birth: Prague, Czech Republic
- Height: 1.74 m (5 ft 8 1/2 in)
- Position: Striker

Team information
- Current team: Schöllnach

Youth career
- –2008: Libuš
- 2008–2010: Slavia Prague

Senior career*
Years	Team	Apps	(Gls)
2010–2015	Slavia Prague	26	(3)
2014	→ Dynamo České Budějovice (loan)	4	(0)
2014–2015	→ Kolín (loan)	16	(0)
2015–2018	Viktoria Žižkov	18	(2)
2016	→ Dobrovice (loan)		
2018	Benešov	10	(0)
2018–2019	Litoměřicko		
2019–2021	Motorlet Prague	6	(0)
2021–2022	Fürstenstein		
2022–2023	Gottsdorf		
2023–2024	Reichstorf		
2024–2025	Sokol Krchleby		
2025–	Schöllnach		

International career^{‡}
2009	Czech Republic U-16	9	(3)
2009–2010	Czech Republic U-17	16	(5)
2010–2011	Czech Republic U-18	9	(2)
2011–2012	Czech Republic U-19	8	(0)
2013	Czech Republic U-20	2	(0)
- * Club domestic league appearances and goals as of 28 September 2019 ‡ National team caps and goals as of 14 October 2013

Martin Hurka (born 20 April 1993) is a Czech football player who currently plays for Schöllnach, as a striker.

== Career ==
Hurka began his career with SK Slavia Prague on youth side, he played than his first game in the Gambrinus liga on 25 April 2010 against Sigma Olomouc.

== International career ==
Hurka had passages in U17 and U18 levels, and was in the national squad for the 2010 UEFA European Under-17 Football Championship.
