= Artun Akçakın =

Turkish footballer (born 1993)

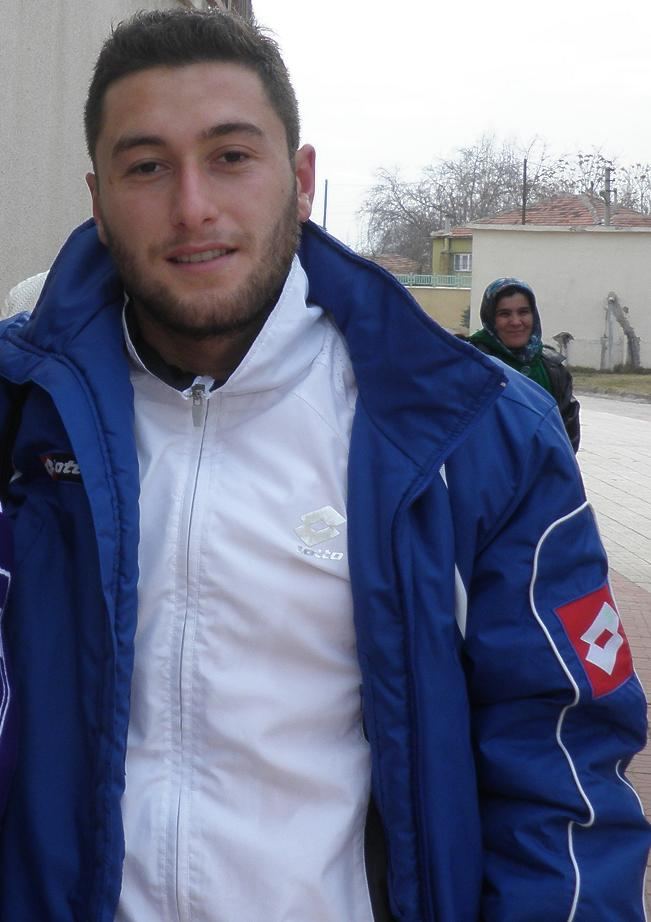

Personal information
- Full name: Artun Akçakın
- Date of birth: 6 May 1993 (age 33)
- Place of birth: Çankaya, Turkey
- Height: 1.82 m (6 ft 0 in)
- Position: Forward

Team information
- Current team: İskenderunspor
- Number: 19

Youth career
- 2003–2009: Gençlerbirliği

Senior career*
Years	Team	Apps	(Gls)
2009–2016	Gençlerbirliği	21	(1)
2010–2012	→ Hacettepe (loan)	53	(27)
2013–2014	→ Fethiyespor (loan)	33	(6)
2015	→ Adana Demirspor (loan)	10	(4)
2015–2016	→ Alanyaspor (loan)	4	(0)
2016	→ Ümraniyespor (loan)	12	(3)
2016–2018	Şanlıurfaspor	54	(10)
2018	Manisa BB	18	(4)
2019	Kastamonuspor 1966	13	(5)
2019–2020	Tarsus İdman Yurdu	26	(13)
2020–2021	Eyüpspor	25	(4)
2021–2022	Tarsus İdman Yurdu	49	(11)
2023–	İskenderunspor	31	(9)

International career^{‡}
2008	Turkey U15	9	(7)
2008–2009	Turkey U16	13	(13)
2009–2010	Turkey U17	23	(15)
2009–2011	Turkey U18	11	(2)
2012	Turkey U19	5	(0)
2012–2013	Turkey U20	8	(1)
2013	Turkey U21	3	(0)
- * Club domestic league appearances and goals as of 1 October 2023 ‡ National team caps and goals as of 26 March 2013

Artun Akçakın (born 6 May 1993) is a Turkish professional footballer who plays as a forward for TFF Second League club İskenderunspor.

== Career ==
=== Club career ===
Akçakın started his youth and professional career with Gençlerbirliği, where his grandfather was manager. During the 2011–12 season, he performed well with Hacettepe, where he was their top scorer. He returned to Gençlerbirliği and joined the first team for the 2012–13 season. Artun was then loaned to Fethiyespor on 28 August 2013. On 11 January 2015, he joined Adana Demirspor on a short-term loan. He then joined Alanyaspor on 7 August 2015, on a one-year loan with option to buy. Nonetheless, on 21 December his loan was terminated. He then joined Ümraniyespor on loan for the remainder of the season.

On 12 July 2016, Artun joined Şanlıurfaspor on a permanent transfer.

On 6 June 2018, he joined Manisa, signing a two-year contract.

On 31 January 2019 Artun joined Kastamonuspor.

On 16 August 2019, he joined Tarsus İdman Yurdu on a free transfer.

After the Covid-19 interruption, Akçakın joined Eyüpspor, signing a one-year contract on 28 July 2020.

After a successful season at Eyüpspor, on 16 June 2021, he returned to Tarsus İdman Yurdu.

On 8 January 2023, Artun joined İskenderunspor signing an 1.5-year contract.

=== International career ===
Akçakın represented Turkey at the 2013 FIFA U-20 World Cup, and lead the team as captain.

== Career statistics ==
=== Club ===
As of 27 November 2023

Appearances and goals by club, season and competition
Club	Season	League			National cup		Total	
Club	Season	Division	Apps	Goals	Apps	Goals	Apps	Goals
Hacettepe (loan)	2010–11	TFF Second League	20	3	0	0	20	3
Hacettepe (loan)	2011–12	TFF Third League	33	24	0	0	33	24
Hacettepe (loan)	Total		53	27	0	0	53	27
Gençlerbirliği	2012–13	Süper Lig	16	0	3	7	19	7
Gençlerbirliği	2014–15	Süper Lig	5	1	4	3	9	4
Gençlerbirliği	Total		21	1	7	10	28	11
Fethiyespor (loan)	2013–14	TFF First League	33	6	4	2	37	8
Adana Demirspor (loan)	2014–15	TFF First League	10	4	2	1	12	5
Alanyaspor (loan)	2015–16	TFF First League	4	0	1	1	5	1
Ümraniyespor (loan)	2015–16	TFF Second League	12	3	0	0	12	3
Şanlıurfaspor	2016–17	TFF First League	24	1	7	2	31	3
Şanlıurfaspor	2017–18	TFF Second League	30	9	0	0	30	9
Şanlıurfaspor	Total		54	10	7	2	61	12
Manisa	2018–19	TFF Second League	18	4	0	0	18	4
Kastamonuspor	2018–19	TFF Second League	13	5	0	0	13	5
Tarsus İdman Yurdu	2019–20	TFF Second League	26	13	1	0	27	13
Eyüpspor	2020–21	TFF Second League	25	4	1	0	26	4
Tarsus İdman Yurdu	2021–22	TFF Second League	36	9	0	0	36	9
Tarsus İdman Yurdu	2022–23	TFF Second League	13	2	1	0	14	2
Tarsus İdman Yurdu	Total		49	11	1	0	50	11
İskenderunspor	2022–23	TFF Second League	21	8	0	0	21	8
İskenderunspor	2023–24	TFF Second League	10	1	0	0	10	1
İskenderunspor	Total		31	9	0	0	31	9
Career total			349	97	25	17	374	114
