= Filip Twardzik =

Czech footballer (born 1993)

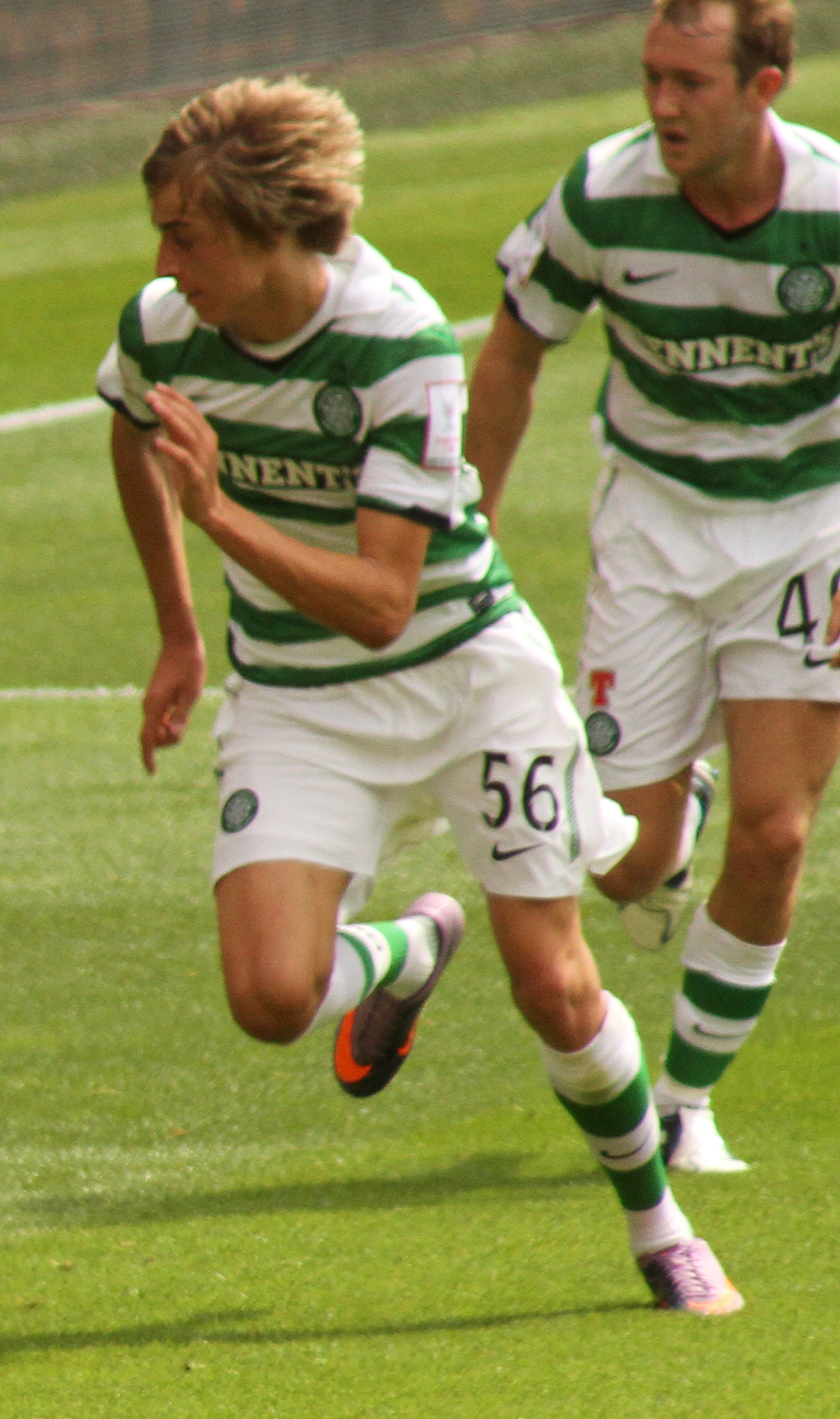
- Twardzik (left) playing for Celtic in 2010

Personal information
- Full name: Filip Twardzik
- Date of birth: 10 February 1993 (age 33)
- Place of birth: Třinec, Czech Republic
- Height: 1.86 m (6 ft 1 in)
- Position: Centre-back

Youth career
- Sachsen Leipzig
- 2007–2008: Rot-Weiß Erfurt
- 2008: Hertha BSC
- 2009–2011: Celtic

Senior career*
| Years | Team | Apps | (Gls) |
| 2011–2015 | Celtic | 5 | (0) |
| 2015–2016 | Bolton Wanderers | 5 | (1) |
| 2017–2018 | Vítkovice | 26 | (6) |
| 2018–2020 | Ružomberok | 42 | (8) |
| 2020 | Karviná | 11 | (0) |
| 2021 | Spartak Trnava | 26 | (4) |
| 2022–2024 | LASK | 5 | (0) |
| 2023 | → Spartak Trnava (loan) | 12 | (3) |
| 2024–2026 | Spartak Trnava | 29 | (0) |

International career
| 2009–2010 | Czech Republic U17 | 14 | (5) |
| 2011–2013 | Czech Republic U19 | 11 | (1) |
- * Club domestic league appearances and goals as of 16 May 2026

Filip Twardzik (born 10 February 1993) is a Czech professional footballer who last played as a centre-back for Spartak Trnava.

== Club career ==
=== Celtic ===
Twardzik and twin brother Patrik started off their careers with Sachsen Leipzig before being signed by Hertha Berlin. On 1 February 2009, they were both signed by Celtic, a week before their 16th birthday. Filip and Patrik both suspended their education when they moved to Celtic. Their mother also moved to Scotland to help them adjust to their new life.

Twardzik made his first-team debut for Celtic on 8 January 2012, coming on as a 70th-minute substitute in a Scottish Cup win against Peterhead. He made his second appearance in the next round of the Scottish Cup against Inverness coming on as a late substitute in the 93rd minute. His league debut came on 7 April in a 6–0 against victory Kilmarnock, he came on shortly after the start of the second half and assisted the fifth goal with a clever back-heel.

=== Bolton Wanderers ===
On 2 February 2015, Twardzik re-joined his former Celtic manager Neil Lennon at Championship side Bolton Wanderers. He signed a two-year contract at the Macron Stadium and went on to score on his debut in a 4–1 defeat for Wanderers at Derby County.

=== MFK Ružomberok ===
After one season with Ostrava-based club MFK Vítkovice (second division), he joined Ružomberok. He cited co-operation with his former coach David Holoubek as one of the reasons for the shift to Ružomberok. He also said that a 'career restart' was another reason for his spell in Ružomberok, where he had been on a pre-season trial two years earlier.

Although in Vítkovice he played as a defensive midfielder, in Ružomberok Holoubek utilised him as a centre-back again. He debuted in Fortuna liga on the first matchday (21 July 2018) against iClinic Sereď. The game concluded as a goal-less tie. In the season he made 19 league appearances (plus 3 in Slovnaft Cup), always in the starting XI. He scored a single goal, on 2 December 2018, in a 3–1 win over struggling reigning champions, Spartak Trnava, from a penalty after a foul on fellow Czech Erik Daniel.

In early March, however, Twardzik suffered an unspecified injury and did not participate in the remaining 12 games of the season, particularly the championship group, during which Ružomberok reclaimed and kept the third position, guaranteeing a spot in next season's Europa League first qualifying round.

After the departure of Holoubek and his assistant Jiří Jarošík from Ružomberok, it was unclear whether Twardzik would remain in the club.

After a tenure at Karviná, Twardzik signed a 2 1/2-year contract with Spartak Trnava in late January 2021.

== International career ==
Twardzik played three times in the 2010 UEFA European Under-17 Championship. He played 14 times in total for Czech Republic U17s scoring five goals. He made his competitive debut for Czech Republic U19s on 21 May 2011, in a 1–0 victory over the Netherlands.

== Personal life ==
Twardzik was born in the Czech Republic but raised and educated in Germany as his father played football there.

His twin brother Patrik, a midfielder, also played for Celtic. His older brother, Dan, plays for VSG Altglienicke as a goalkeeper. His father, René, was also a goalkeeper and played for Sachsen Leipzig.

== Honours ==
Spartak Trnava

- Slovak Cup: 2022–23, 2024–25
