= Taşkın Çalış =

Turkish footballer

Personal information
- Full name: Taşkın Çalış
- Date of birth: 25 July 1993 (age 33)
- Place of birth: Bonn, Germany
- Height: 1.78 m (5 ft 10 in)
- Position: Defensive midfielder

Team information
- Current team: İnegöl Kafkasspor
- Number: 10

Youth career
- Alemannia Aachen
- 2009–2011: Borussia Mönchengladbach

Senior career*
Years	Team	Apps	(Gls)
2011–2014	Gaziantepspor	29	(0)
2014	Bursaspor	4	(0)
2014–2015	Akhisarspor	1	(0)
2015–2016	Gümüşhanespor	32	(7)
2016–2018	Yeni Malatyaspor	0	(0)
2016–2017	→ Gümüşhanespor (loan)	36	(8)
2017–2018	→ Menemenspor (loan)	35	(8)
2018–2021	Menemenspor	74	(11)
2021	Balıkesirspor	14	(4)
2021–2022	Ankara Keçiörengücü	24	(0)
2022–2023	Bucaspor 1928	38	(2)
2024	Amed	17	(1)
2024–2025	Nazilli Spor	21	(4)
2025–2026	Erbaaspor	21	(2)
2026–	İnegöl Kafkasspor	2	(0)

International career
2009–2010	Turkey U17	18	(5)
2010–2011	Turkey U18	6	(0)
2010–2012	Turkey U19	9	(6)
2012–2013	Turkey U20	9	(1)
2013	Turkey U21	2	(0)
- * Club domestic league appearances and goals as of 1 October 2026

Taşkın Çalış (born 25 July 1993) is a footballer who plays for TFF 2. Lig club İnegöl Kafkasspor.

== Career ==
=== Club career ===
Çalış made his Süper Lig debut for Gaziantepspor on 4 January 2012.

After having his contract terminated in January 2014, he joined Bursaspor as a free agent.

He then joined Akhisarspor for the 2014–15 season, wearing number 7.

On 2 August 2016, he joined Yeni Malatyaspor. Later that month, he rejoined Gümüşhanespor on loan.

On 11 July 2017, Çalış joined Menemen on a one-year loan. In 2020, he extended his contract with Menemen.

On 29 January 2021, he joined Balıkesirspor for a fee of ₺250,000 (approximately €8,000).

On 24 June 2021, Çalış joined Ankara Keçiörengücü on free transfer, signing a three-year contract.

On 10 August 2022, he joined Bucaspor 1928.

=== International career ===
Çalış represented Turkey at the 2013 FIFA U-20 World Cup.

== Career statistics ==
=== Club ===
As of 20 November 2023

Appearances and goals by club, season and competition
Club	Season	League			National Cup		Other		Total	
Club	Season	Division	Apps	Goals	Apps	Goals	Apps	Goals	Apps	Goals
Gaziantepspor	2011–12	Süper Lig	1	0	0	0	6 (Note: Appearances in Spor Toto Cup)	0	7	0
Gaziantepspor	2012–13	Süper Lig	20	0	3	0	—		23	0
Gaziantepspor	2013–14	Süper Lig	8	0	1	0	—		9	0
Gaziantepspor	Total		29	0	4	0	6	0	39	0
Bursaspor	2013–14	Süper Lig	4	0	0	0	—		4	0
Arkhisarspor	2014–15	Süper Lig	1	0	5	0	—		6	0
Gümüşhanespor	2015–16	TFF Second League	32	7	1	0	—		33	7
Gümüşhanespor (loan)	2016–17	TFF Second League	36	8	4	0	—		40	8
Menemenspor (loan)	2017–18	TFF Second League	35	8	0	0	—		35	8
Menemenspor	2018–19	TFF Second League	32	7	3	0	—		35	7
Menemenspor	2019–20	TFF First League	27	3	1	1	—		28	4
Menemenspor	2020–21	TFF First League	15	1	1	0	—		16	1
Menemenspor	Total		109	19	5	1	0	0	114	20
Balıkesirspor	2020–21	TFF First League	14	4	0	0	—		14	0
Ankara Keçiörengücü	2021–22	TFF First League	24	0	1	0	—		25	0
Bucaspor 1928	2022–23	TFF Second League	28	1	1	0	—		29	1
Bucaspor 1928	2023–24	TFF Second League	11	1	0	0	—		11	1
Bucaspor 1928	Total		39	2	1	0	0	0	40	2
Career total			288	40	24	1	6	0	318	41
