= Patrik Twardzik =

Czech footballer (born 1993)

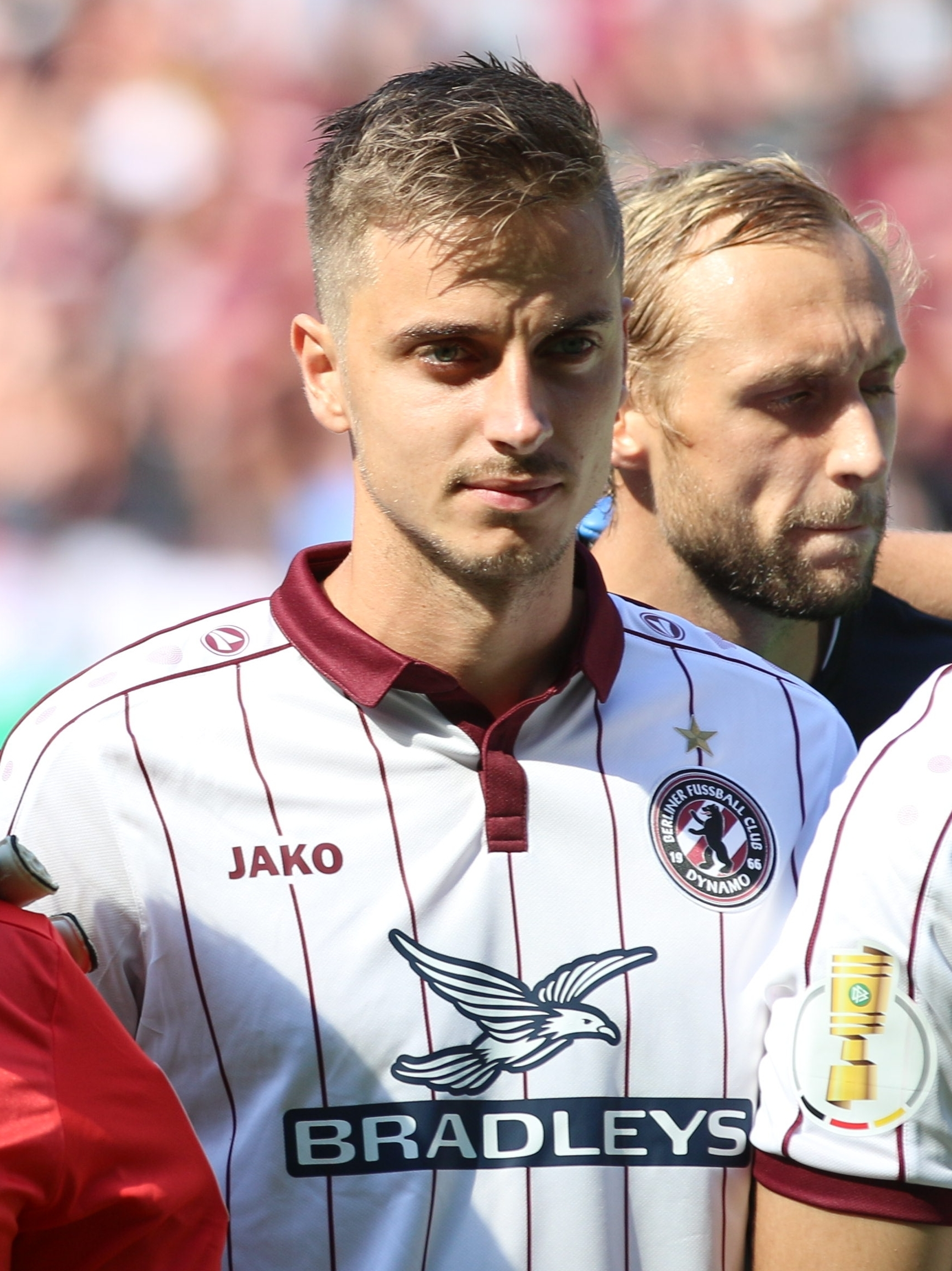
- Twardzik with BFC Dynamo in 2018

Personal information
- Date of birth: 10 February 1993 (age 33)
- Place of birth: Třinec, Czech Republic
- Height: 1.85 m (6 ft 1 in)
- Position: Midfielder

Team information
- Current team: FC Gütersloh
- Number: 18

Youth career
- –2008: Rot-Weiß Erfurt
- 2008–2009: Hertha BSC
- 2009–2012: Celtic

Senior career*
Years	Team	Apps	(Gls)
2012–2014	Celtic	0	(0)
2013–2014	→ Livingston (loan)	1	(0)
2014–2017	Rot-Weiß Erfurt II	15	(1)
2014–2017	Rot-Weiß Erfurt	5	(0)
2017–2018	Germania Halberstadt	59	(11)
2018	BFC Dynamo	9	(0)
2019–2021	Germania Halberstadt	48	(8)
2021–2023	Rot Weiss Ahlen	62	(2)
2023–	FC Gütersloh	97	(54)

International career
	Czech Republic U17	13	(3)
	Czech Republic U19	2	(0)
- * Club domestic league appearances and goals as of 23 September 2026

Patrik Twardzik (born 10 February 1993) is a Czech footballer who plays as a midfielder for German Regionalliga West club FC Gütersloh.

== Early life ==
Twardzik was born in the Czech Republic but educated in Germany as his father played football there.

== Club career ==
Twardzik and twin brother Filip started off their careers with Sachsen Leipzig before being signed by Hertha Berlin. On 1 February 2009, they were both signed by Celtic, a week before their 16th birthday. Filip and Patrik both suspended their education when they moved to Celtic. Their mother also moved to Scotland to help them adjust to their new life.

In September 2012, Twardzik signed a contract extension with the club, which will keep him until 2014. After a year, Twardzik joined Scottish Championship side Livingston on loan that will keep him until January. Twardzik made his debut for the club on 23 November 2013, where he set up a goal, in a 5–1 victory over Greenock Morton. After appearing two substitute appearances for the club, Twardzik returned to his parent club. At the end of the season, Twardzik was released by the club upon his expiry of his contract and separating his twin brother.

In November 2014 he joined the reserve team of his youth club Rot-Weiß Erfurt.

Twardzik signed for Rot Weiss Ahlen in 2021.

== Personal life ==
His twin brother Filip, a defender, also played for Celtic. His older brother, Dan, plays for Motherwell as a goalkeeper. His father, René, was also a goalkeeper and played for Sachsen Leipzig.

== Career statistics ==
As of match played 3 February 2018

Appearances and goals by club, season and competition
Club	Season	League			National cup		Other		Total	
Club	Season	Division	Apps	Goals	Apps	Goals	Apps	Goals	Apps	Goals
Livingston (loan)	2013–14	Scottish Championship	1	0	1	0	0	0	2	0
Rot-Weiß Erfurt	2015–16	3. Liga	5	0	—		—		5	0
Germania Halberstadt	2017–18	Regionalliga Nordost	19	3	1	0	—		20	3
Career total			25	3	2	0	0	0	27	3
