= 2026 UEFA European Under-17 Championship qualification =

Tournament details
- Dates: Round 1: 1 October – 18 November 2025; Round 2: 25 March – 9 June 2026
- Teams: 54 (from 1 confederation)

Tournament statistics
- Matches played: 156
- Goals scored: 560 (3.59 per match)
- Top scorer(s): (Iceland) Alexander Máni Guðjónsson (Italy) Diego Perillo (6 goals each)

The 2026 UEFA European Under-17 Championship qualification is an under-17 men's national football team competition that will determine the seven teams joining the automatically qualified hosts Estonia in the 2026 UEFA European Under-17 Championship final tournament.

Russia were excluded from the tournament due to the ongoing invasion of Ukraine. Therefore, including hosts Estonia, 54 teams entered this qualification competition. The Round 1 of the qualification was played from 1 October to 18 November 2025, while the Round 2 will be played in spring 2026. Players born on or after 1 January 2009 are eligible to participate.

== Format ==
The qualification consisted of two rounds; both of them consisted of several groups, which were played as single-round-robin mini-tournaments, with one team from each group selected as the host after the draw.

- Round 1: 54 teams were drawn into 14 groups of three or four. The top two teams from each group advanced to Round 2 League A; the other teams advanced to Round 2 League B.
- Round 2:
  - League A: 28 teams were drawn into seven groups of four. The group winners qualified for the final tournament. If Estonia, as the host of the final tournament, won one of these groups, the best runner-up team also qualified. Teams that finished fourth were relegated to Round 1 League B for the next season.
  - League B: 26 teams were drawn into seven groups of three or four. The group winners were promoted to Round 1 League A for the next season.

In addition, the qualification also acted as the UEFA qualifiers for the FIFA U-17 World Cup, with Round 1 being the first round and Round 2 League A being the final round of World Cup qualifying. The winners of each group in Round 2 League A, along with the four best second-placed teams, qualified for the 2026 FIFA U-17 World Cup.

=== Tiebreakers ===
In a group, teams were ranked according to points (3 points for a win, 1 point for a draw, 0 points for a loss), and if tied on points, the following tiebreaking criteria were applied, in the order given, to determine the rankings (Regulations Articles 14.01 and 14.02):

1. Points in head-to-head matches among tied teams;
2. Goal difference in head-to-head matches among tied teams;
3. Goals scored in head-to-head matches among tied teams;
4. If more than two teams were tied, and after applying all head-to-head criteria above, a subset of teams were still tied, all head-to-head criteria above were reapplied exclusively to this subset of teams;
5. Goal difference in all group matches;
6. Goals scored in all group matches;
7. Penalty shoot-out if only two teams had the same number of points, and they met in the last round of the group and were tied after applying all criteria above (not used if more than two teams had the same number of points, or if their rankings were not relevant for qualification for the next stage);
8. Disciplinary points (red card = 3 points, yellow card = 1 point, expulsion for two yellow cards in one match = 3 points);
9. Position in the applicable ranking:
  1. for teams in Round 1, position in the 2024–25 qualification overall rankings;
  2. for teams in Round 2, position in the Round 1 overall rankings.

== Round 1 ==
=== Draw ===
The draw for Round 1 was held on 5 December 2024 at the UEFA headquarters in Nyon, Switzerland.

The teams were seeded according to their results in Round 1 of the 2024–25 qualification. The matches of the first-, the second- and the third-placed teams against the fourth-placed teams in their group did not count towards this ranking. To determine this ranking, the following criteria were followed (Regulations Article 15.03):

1. higher position in the group;
2. higher number of points;
3. superior goal difference;
4. higher number of goals scored;
5. lower disciplinary points (red card = 3 points, yellow card = 1 point, expulsion for two yellow cards in one match = 3 points).

The teams were allocated to four drawing pots. Teams in the same pot were drawn into different groups. Each group contained one team from Pot A, one team from Pot B, one team from Pot C, and 12 groups contained one team from Pot D. Based on the decisions taken by the UEFA Emergency Panel, the following pairs of teams could not be drawn in the same group: Spain and Gibraltar, Belarus and Ukraine, Kosovo and Serbia. Due to the ongoing situation, Ukraine, Israel and Belarus could not host tournaments on their territory.

Pot A
Team	Position in group	Pts.	GD	GS
Italy	Winner, Group 9	6	11	11
Portugal	Winner, Group 5	6	6	9
England	Winner, Group 1	6	6	8
France	Winner, Group 11	6	3	3
Belgium	Winner, Group 4	6	2	4
Spain	Winner, Group 12	4	5	7
Czech Republic	Winner, Group 7	4	3	6
Switzerland	Winner, Group 10	4	3	5
Poland	Winner, Group 2	4	3	5
Greece	Winner, Group 6	4	3	5
Croatia	Winner, Group 3	4	2	4
Serbia	Winner, Group 13	4	2	3
Austria	Winner, Group 14	4	1	2
Northern Ireland	Winner, Group 8	3	0	4

Pot B
Team	Position in group	Pts.	GD	GS
Germany	Runner-up, Group 7	4	6	11
Iceland	Runner-up, Group 12	4	3	6
Slovenia	Runner-up, Group 2	4	1	4
Turkey	Runner-up, Group 13	4	1	2
Netherlands	Runner-up, Group 3	3	3	6
Denmark	Runner-up, Group 14	3	2	3
Ukraine	Runner-up, Group 4	3	1	5
Slovakia	Runner-up, Group 11	3	0	3
Sweden	Runner-up, Group 1	3	–1	4
Norway	Runner-up, Group 9	3	–6	4
Israel	Runner-up, Group 10	2	0	3
Hungary	Runner-up, Group 6	2	0	2
Republic of Ireland	Runner-up, Group 8	1	–2	3
Finland	Runner-up, Group 5	1	–4	3

Pot C
Team	Position in group	Pts.	GD	GS
Lithuania	Third, Group 8	4	2	5
Bosnia and Herzegovina	Third, Group 5	1	–2	4
Montenegro	Third, Group 10	1	–3	1
Luxembourg	Third, Group 14	1	–3	1
Romania	Third, Group 6	1	–3	0
Albania	Third, Group 3	1	–5	1
Kosovo	Third, Group 4	0	–3	3
Cyprus	Third, Group 11	0	–3	2
Bulgaria	Third, Group 13	0	–3	0
Georgia	Third, Group 2	0	–4	1
Wales	Third, Group 9	0	–5	3
Latvia	Third, Group 1	0	–5	1
North Macedonia	Third, Group 12	0	–8	1
Belarus	Third, Group 7	0	–9	2

Pot D
Team	Position in group	Pts.	GD	GS
Scotland	Last, Group 8	3	–4	3
Kazakhstan	Last, Group 4	1	–5	5
Azerbaijan	Last, Group 6	1	–7	1
Estonia	Last, Group 12	0	–8	3
Armenia	Last, Group 2	0	–11	1
Moldova	Last, Group 10	0	–11	0
Malta	Last, Group 1	0	–12	1
Andorra	Last, Group 7	0	–14	1
San Marino	Last, Group 9	0	–14	0
Faroe Islands	Last, Group 3	0	–14	0
Gibraltar	Last, Group 11	0	–19	0
Liechtenstein	Last, Group 5	0	–24	0

Times are CET/CEST, (Note: CEST (UTC+2) for dates up to 25 October 2025, and CET (UTC+1) for dates thereafter.) as listed by UEFA (local times, if different, are in parentheses).

=== Group 1 ===
Pos	Team	Pld	W	D	L	GF	GA	GD	Pts	Qualification
1	Montenegro	3	2	1	0	4	2	+2	7	Round 2 League A
2	Italy	3	2	0	1	11	4	+7	6	Round 2 League A
3	Ukraine	3	1	1	1	4	3	+1	4	Round 2 League B
4	Estonia (H)	3	0	0	3	1	11	−10	0	Round 2 League B

Source: UEFA
Rules for classification: Tiebreakers
(H) Hosts
1 October 2025
11:30 (12:30 UTC+3)

Italy	8–1	Estonia
Perillo 9'; Giammattei 13'; Corigliano 16'; Varali 41'; Bonifazi 47'; Fugazzola 49'; Gasparello 66'; Del Fabro 81'	Report	Visse 64'

Rakvere Linnastaadion, Rakvere
Attendance: 146
Referee: Patryk Gryckiewicz (Poland)
1 October 2025
14:30 (15:30 UTC+3)

Montenegro	1–1	Ukraine
Kljajević 28'	Report	Serdiuk 71'

Kalevi Keskstaadion, Tallinn
Attendance: 32
Referee: Aleko Aptsiauri (Georgia)

4 October 2025
11:30 (12:30 UTC+3)

Italy	1–2	Montenegro
Corigliano 31'	Report	Vujović 21'; Vušurović 49'

Kalevi Keskstaadion, Tallinn
Attendance: 51
Referee: Sam Barrott (England)
4 October 2025
14:30 (15:30 UTC+3)

Ukraine	2–0	Estonia
Buravtsov 40'; Serdiuk 76'	Report

Rakvere Linnastaadion, Rakvere
Attendance: 140
Referee: Aleko Aptsiauri (Georgia)

7 October 2025
14:30 (15:30 UTC+3)

Estonia	0–1	Montenegro
	Report	Vujović 22'

Rakvere Linnastaadion, Rakvere
Attendance: 90
Referee: Sam Barrott (England)
7 October 2025
14:30 (15:30 UTC+3)

Ukraine	1–2	Italy
Kvikvinia 55'	Report	Giammattei 34'; Perillo 85'

Kalevi Keskstaadion, Tallinn
Attendance: 42
Referee: Patryk Gryckiewicz (Poland)

=== Group 2 ===
Pos	Team	Pld	W	D	L	GF	GA	GD	Pts	Qualification
1	Czech Republic	3	3	0	0	22	1	+21	9	Round 2 League A
2	North Macedonia (H)	3	1	1	1	11	4	+7	4	Round 2 League A
3	Hungary	3	1	1	1	11	9	+2	4	Round 2 League B
4	Gibraltar	3	0	0	3	0	30	−30	0	Round 2 League B

Source: UEFA
Rules for classification: Tiebreakers
(H) Hosts
8 October 2025
13:00

Czech Republic	13–0	Gibraltar
Zahálka 1', 14', 40'; Azaka 11', 22', 45+2'; Švec 16', 20'; Drakes 31' (o.g.); Srb 45+3'; Cáhlik 55' (pen.); Ilinčič 71'; Key 88' (o.g.)	Report

Stadion Kukuš, Turnovo
Attendance: 35
Referee: Karl Koppel (Estonia)
8 October 2025
13:00

North Macedonia	2–2	Hungary
Stojkovski 44'; Dzangarovski 67'	Report	Polonkai 23'; Bősze 48'

Stadion Mladost, Strumica
Attendance: 200
Referee: Artem Gasparyan (Armenia)

11 October 2025
13:00

Czech Republic	2–0	North Macedonia
Marek 31'; Sivok 87'	Report

Stadion Mladost, Strumica
Attendance: 220
Referee: Dmytro Kubriak (Ukraine)
11 October 2025
13:00

Hungary	8–0	Gibraltar
Juhász 23'; Somogyi 30', 45+4', 69'; Somfalvi 48'; Bősze 66'; Polonkai 89'; Dajka 90+5'	Report

Stadion Kukuš, Turnovo
Attendance: 35
Referee: Karl Koppel (Estonia)

14 October 2025
13:00

Hungary	1–7	Czech Republic
Bősze 89' (pen.)	Report	Zahálka 10'; Švec 28'; Srb 40', 84'; Polonkai 58' (o.g.); Cvejn 68'; Chumlen 73'

Stadion Mladost, Strumica
Attendance: 30
Referee: Artem Gasparyan (Armenia)
14 October 2025
13:00

Gibraltar	0–9	North Macedonia
	Report	Papaliski 23', 44', 68'; Ljacka 34'; Mihajlovski 41'; Cvetkovski 53'; Dzangarovski 56', 61' (pen.); Mamuti 89'

Stadion Kukuš, Turnovo
Attendance: 60
Referee: Dmytro Kubriak (Ukraine)

=== Group 3 ===
Pos	Team	Pld	W	D	L	GF	GA	GD	Pts	Qualification
1	Sweden	3	3	0	0	9	3	+6	9	Round 2 League A
2	Scotland (H)	3	2	0	1	5	3	+2	6	Round 2 League A
3	Lithuania	3	1	0	2	2	6	−4	3	Round 2 League B
4	England	3	0	0	3	3	7	−4	0	Round 2 League B

Source: UEFA
Rules for classification: Tiebreakers
(H) Hosts
28 October 2025
12:00 (11:00 UTC+1)

Lithuania	0–2	Sweden
	Report	Odefalk 28'; Bardghji 79'

Broadwood Stadium, Cumbernauld
Attendance: 74
Referee: Wojciech Myc (Poland)
28 October 2025
16:30 (15:30 UTC+1)

England	0–1	Scotland
	Report	Douglas 90+5'

Excelsior Stadium, Airdrie
Attendance: 617
Referee: Szabolcs Kovacs (Romania)

31 October 2025
12:00 (11:00 UTC+1)

England	0–1	Lithuania
	Report	Jonyla 17'

Broadwood Stadium, Cumbernauld
Attendance: 131
Referee: Ladislav Szikszay (Czech Republic)
31 October 2025
16:30 (15:30 UTC+1)

Sweden	2–0	Scotland
Santos 35'; Mehmeti 38'	Report

Excelsior Stadium, Airdrie
Attendance: 386
Referee: Szabolcs Kovacs (Romania)

3 November 2025
16:00 (15:00 UTC+1)

Sweden	5–3	England
Odefalk 17'; Bardghji 39', 50'; Mehmeti 55', 65'	Report	Madjo 13', 90+3'; Boast 63' (pen.)

Broadwood Stadium, Cumbernauld
Attendance: 96
Referee: Ladislav Szikszay (Czech Republic)
3 November 2025
16:00 (15:00 UTC+1)

Scotland	4–1	Lithuania
Cadamarteri 6', 27' (pen.), 39'; Thomson 82'	Report	Pocius 59'

Excelsior Stadium, Airdrie
Attendance: 252
Referee: Wojciech Myc (Poland)

=== Group 4 ===
Pos	Team	Pld	W	D	L	GF	GA	GD	Pts	Qualification
1	Spain (H)	3	3	0	0	12	0	+12	9	Round 2 League A
2	Denmark	3	2	0	1	7	7	0	6	Round 2 League A
3	Latvia	3	1	0	2	7	9	−2	3	Round 2 League B
4	Andorra	3	0	0	3	2	12	−10	0	Round 2 League B

Source: UEFA
Rules for classification: Tiebreakers
(H) Hosts
8 October 2025
11:30

Latvia	2–3	Denmark
Solomonovs 38', 57'	Report	Jørgensen 31', 44'; Vestergaard 87'

Ciudad Deportiva, Los Ángeles de San Rafael
Attendance: 35
Referee: Karel Rouček (Czech Republic)
8 October 2025
18:30

Spain	3–0	Andorra
Del Pino 74'; Tunkara 76', 83' (pen.)	Report

Ciudad Deportiva, Los Ángeles de San Rafael
Attendance: 130
Referee: Florian Lata (Albania)

11 October 2025
11:30

Spain	5–0	Latvia
Tomás 5'; Tunkara 58'; Pesquer 61'; Del Pino 69'; Żuk 86'	Report

Ciudad Deportiva, Los Ángeles de San Rafael
Attendance: 117
Referee: Simon Bourdeaud'hui (Belgium)
11 October 2025
16:30

Denmark	4–1	Andorra
Hansen 8', 83', 86'; Nicolaisen 88'	Report	Barral 25'

Ciudad Deportiva, Los Ángeles de San Rafael
Attendance: 74
Referee: Florian Lata (Albania)

14 October 2025
16:30

Denmark	0–4	Spain
	Report	Del Pino 55'; Badji 58'; Alves 67'; Mayans 73'

Municipal Campo de Fútbol Matapiñonera, San Sebastian de los Reyes
Attendance: 1505
Referee: Simon Bourdeaud'hui (Belgium)
14 October 2025
16:30

Andorra	1–5	Latvia
Moreno 21'	Report	Saveļjevs 11'; Menniks 38'; Ščerbinskis 45+2'; Solomonovs 61'; Bombāns 70'

Ciudad Deportiva, Los Ángeles de San Rafael
Attendance: 20
Referee: Karel Rouček (Czech Republic)

=== Group 5 ===
Pos	Team	Pld	W	D	L	GF	GA	GD	Pts	Qualification
1	Belgium (H)	3	3	0	0	9	0	+9	9	Round 2 League A
2	Norway	3	1	1	1	5	6	−1	4	Round 2 League A
3	Belarus	3	1	0	2	9	10	−1	3	Round 2 League B
4	Moldova	3	0	1	2	1	8	−7	1	Round 2 League B

Source: UEFA
Rules for classification: Tiebreakers
(H) Hosts
8 October 2025
14:00

Belarus	3–4	Norway
Yastachkin 14' (pen.); Varonin 58'; Hudach 69' (pen.)	Report	Wilhelmsen 9'; Cedergren 89' (pen.), 90+4'; Johnsen 90+1'

Académie Robert Louis-Dreyfus, Seraing
Attendance: 51
Referee: Giorgi Avazashvili (Georgia)
8 October 2025
19:00

Belgium	1–0	Moldova
Kana 25'	Report

Stedelijk Sportstadion, Hasselt
Attendance: 253
Referee: Aaron Wyn Jones (Wales)

11 October 2025
14:00

Norway	1–1	Moldova
Elvebu 45+3'	Report	Palancica 25'

Cegeka Arena, Genk
Attendance: 105
Referee: Kamal Umudlu (Azerbaijan)
11 October 2025
19:00

Belgium	6–0	Belarus
Benktib 10'; Dierckx 19', 65' (pen.); Achahbar 30', 70'; Kamara 90+3'	Report

Stedelijk Sportstadion, Lommel
Attendance: 650
Referee: Aaron Wyn Jones (Wales)

14 October 2025
15:00

Norway	0–2	Belgium
	Report	Dierckx 80'; Achahbar 84'

Académie Robert Louis-Dreyfus, Seraing
Attendance: 208
Referee: Giorgi Avazashvili (Georgia)
14 October 2025
15:00

Moldova	0–6	Belarus
	Report	Liavonenka 6'; Varonin 9' (pen.); Hudach 13', 82'; Tsitou 38'; Sanko 89'

Stedelijk Sportstadion, Hasselt
Attendance: 28
Referee: Kamal Umudlu (Azerbaijan)

=== Group 6 ===
Pos	Team	Pld	W	D	L	GF	GA	GD	Pts	Qualification
1	Republic of Ireland	3	3	0	0	7	0	+7	9	Round 2 League A
2	Austria (H)	3	2	0	1	9	6	+3	6	Round 2 League A
3	Faroe Islands	3	1	0	2	4	10	−6	3	Round 2 League B
4	Kosovo	3	0	0	3	5	9	−4	0	Round 2 League B

Source: UEFA
Rules for classification: Tiebreakers
(H) Hosts
8 October 2025
12:00

Kosovo	0–2	Republic of Ireland
	Report	Byrne 44'; Mahon 61'

Lindabrunn, Enzesfeld-Lindabrunn
Attendance: 200
Referee: Anton Lashuk (Belarus)
8 October 2025
18:00

Austria	5–1	Faroe Islands
Aleksic 19' (pen.); M'Bock 52'; Mijatovic 65'; Schreiber 81'; Berger 88'	Report	Anghel 77'

Wiener Neustadt Arena, Wiener Neustadt
Attendance: 358
Referee: Rares Vidican (Romania)

11 October 2025
12:00

Republic of Ireland	3–0	Faroe Islands
Murray 18'; Mahon 48' (pen.); Murphy 53'	Report

Lindabrunn, Enzesfeld-Lindabrunn
Attendance: 100
Referee: Márton Rúsz (Hungary)
11 October 2025
16:00

Austria	4–3	Kosovo
Jakupi 8', 13'; M'Bock 45+3'; Mijatovic 52'	Report	Mustafa 42'; Llugaxhiu 45+1'; Krasniqi 61' (pen.)

Wiener Neustadt Arena, Wiener Neustadt
Attendance: 650
Referee: Rares Vidican (Romania)

14 October 2025
15:00

Republic of Ireland	2–0	Austria
Mahon 60'; Sheridan 82'	Report

Wiener Neustadt Arena, Wiener Neustadt
Attendance: 215
Referee: Márton Rúsz (Hungary)
14 October 2025
15:00

Faroe Islands	3–2	Kosovo
Anghel 14'; Danielsen 27'; Joensen 59'	Report	Llugaxhiu 34'; Mustafa 90+5' (pen.)

Lindabrunn, Enzesfeld-Lindabrunn
Attendance: 103
Referee: Anton Lashuk (Belarus)

=== Group 7 ===
Pos	Team	Pld	W	D	L	GF	GA	GD	Pts	Qualification
1	Turkey	3	3	0	0	11	3	+8	9	Round 2 League A
2	Serbia (H)	3	2	0	1	7	3	+4	6	Round 2 League A
3	Bosnia and Herzegovina	3	0	1	2	3	6	−3	1	Round 2 League B
4	Malta	3	0	1	2	2	11	−9	1	Round 2 League B

Source: UEFA
Rules for classification: Tiebreakers
(H) Hosts
11 November 2025
11:00

Bosnia and Herzegovina	1–3	Turkey
Jovic 46'	Report	Yüzgeç 16'; Şen 42'; Kalpakli 68'

Voždovac Stadium, Belgrade
Attendance: 50
Referee: Ben Mcmaster (Northern Ireland)
11 November 2025
17:00

Serbia	4–0	Malta
Grujić 3' (pen.); Mitić 13'; Matanović 70'; Andrijašević 75'	Report

SRC Mladost Pančevo, Pančevo
Attendance: 146
Referee: Martin Matoša (Slovenia)

14 November 2025
11:00

Turkey	5–0	Malta
Kalpakli 22', 27', 69'; Sayar 76'; Demirbilek 81'	Report

Voždovac Stadium, Belgrade
Attendance: 30
Referee: Ben Mcmaster (Northern Ireland)
14 November 2025
17:00

Serbia	1–0	Bosnia and Herzegovina
Anokić 90+6' (pen.)	Report

SRC Mladost Pančevo, Pančevo
Attendance: 185
Referee: Jakob Semler (Austria)

17 November 2025
16:00

Turkey	3–2	Serbia
Demirbilek 26'; Yüzgeç 61'; Şen 68'	Report	Matanović 24'; Millwood Rece 55'

SRC Mladost Pančevo, Pančevo
Attendance: 173
Referee: Jakob Semler (Austria)
17 November 2025
16:00

Malta	2–2	Bosnia and Herzegovina
Roe 39'; Attard 48'	Report	Vulin 28'; Korora 62'

Voždovac Stadium, Belgrade
Attendance: 25
Referee: Martin Matoša (Slovenia)

=== Group 8 ===
Pos	Team	Pld	W	D	L	GF	GA	GD	Pts	Qualification
1	Kazakhstan	3	2	0	1	5	6	−1	6 (Note: Ranked on head-to-head points: Kazakhstan 3, Croatia 0.)	Round 2 League A
2	Croatia (H)	3	2	0	1	7	4	+3	6	Round 2 League A
3	Netherlands	3	1	1	1	7	5	+2	4	Round 2 League B
4	Albania	3	0	1	2	2	6	−4	1	Round 2 League B

Source: UEFA
Rules for classification: Tiebreakers
(H) Hosts
Notes:
11 November 2025
11:30

Croatia	1–2	Kazakhstan
Frigan 33' (pen.)	Report	Rakym 2'; Akimov 45'

SRP Trate Nedelišće, Nedelišće
Attendance: 200
Referee: Oscar Johnson (Sweden)
11 November 2025
13:45

Albania	1–1	Netherlands
Vata 52'	Report	Schaken 11'

Sportski park NK Graničar, Kotoriba
Attendance: 103
Referee: Oguzhan Çakir (Turkey)

14 November 2025
11:30

Croatia	3–0	Albania
Bartolović 10'; Miličić 26'; Frigan 35'	Report

SRP Trate Nedelišće, Nedelišće
Attendance: 224
Referee: Oscar Johnson (Sweden)
14 November 2025
13:45

Netherlands	4–1	Kazakhstan
Simeon 9'; Van Der Lijcke 26'; Abdalla 44' (pen.), 90+5'	Report	Orynbassar 56' (pen.)

Sportski park NK Graničar, Kotoriba
Attendance: 65
Referee: Ross Hardie (Scotland)

17 November 2025
11:30

Netherlands	2–3	Croatia
Plantinga 14'; Schaken 53'	Report	Bartolović 61' (pen.); Škafar 68'; Beljan 90+1' (pen.)

Sportski park NK Graničar, Kotoriba
Attendance: 300
Referee: Oguzhan Çakir (Turkey)
17 November 2025
11:30

Kazakhstan	2–1	Albania
Chernomorets 21'; Zhilkaidar 58'	Report	Muslika 90+5'

SRP Trate Nedelišće, Nedelišće
Attendance: 50
Referee: Ross Hardie (Scotland)

=== Group 9 ===
Pos	Team	Pld	W	D	L	GF	GA	GD	Pts	Qualification
1	France (H)	3	2	1	0	14	1	+13	7	Round 2 League A
2	Romania	3	1	2	0	7	3	+4	5	Round 2 League A
3	Israel	3	1	1	1	6	7	−1	4	Round 2 League B
4	Azerbaijan	3	0	0	3	2	18	−16	0	Round 2 League B

Source: UEFA
Rules for classification: Tiebreakers
(H) Hosts
8 October 2025
15:00

France	8–0	Azerbaijan
Merrifield 28'; Dago 30'; Gadou 38'; Traore 45+6' (pen.), 64'; Amaaouch 57', 85'; Zeynalov 84' (o.g.)	Report

Bourret, Capbreton
Attendance: 304
Referee: Marius Hansen Grøtta (Norway)
8 October 2025
18:00

Romania	1–1	Israel
Niculcea 63'	Report	Dadia 82'

Plaine des Sports, Saint-Paul-lès-Dax
Attendance: 130
Referee: Vlatko Ilioski (North Macedonia)

11 October 2025
15:00

France	1–1	Romania
Traore 90+6'	Report	Niculcea 81' (pen.)

Bourret, Capbreton
Attendance: 260
Referee: Mateo Erceg (Croatia)
11 October 2025
18:00

Israel	5–1	Azerbaijan
Bar 39', 47'; Grimberg 83'; Didi 90' (pen.); Zuares 90+4'	Report	Sharifov 45+1'

Plaine des Sports, Saint-Paul-lès-Dax
Attendance: 61
Referee: Marius Hansen Grøtta (Norway)

14 October 2025
15:00

Israel	0–5	France
	Report	Munongo 20'; Gadou 40', 50'; Merrifield 46'; Batola 89'

Plaine des Sports, Saint-Paul-lès-Dax
Attendance: 187
Referee: Vlatko Ilioski (North Macedonia)
14 October 2025
15:00

Azerbaijan	1–5	Romania
Bashirov 20'	Report	Niculcea 24'; Marincean 40'; Corlat 65' (pen.); Rusu 77', 90+2'

Bourret, Capbreton
Attendance: 115
Referee: Mateo Erceg (Croatia)

=== Group 10 ===
Pos	Team	Pld	W	D	L	GF	GA	GD	Pts	Qualification
1	Slovakia (H)	3	2	1	0	4	1	+3	7	Round 2 League A
2	Switzerland	3	1	2	0	4	2	+2	5	Round 2 League A
3	Bulgaria	3	1	1	1	6	2	+4	4	Round 2 League B
4	San Marino	3	0	0	3	0	9	−9	0	Round 2 League B

Source: UEFA
Rules for classification: Tiebreakers
(H) Hosts
28 October 2025
13:00

Switzerland	2–0	San Marino
Azemi 3'; Montebelli 16' (o.g.)	Report

Mestský štadión, Spišská Nová Ves
Attendance: 64
Referee: Igor Bosca (Moldova)
28 October 2025
17:00

Bulgaria	0–1	Slovakia
	Report	Ševčík 42'

NTC Poprad, Poprad
Attendance: 190
Referee: Klym Zabroda (Ukraine)

31 October 2025
13:00

Switzerland	1–1	Bulgaria
Izquierdo 90+3'	Report	Kakor 48' (o.g.)

Mestský štadión, Spišská Nová Ves
Attendance: 155
Referee: Igor Bosca (Moldova)
31 October 2025
17:00

Slovakia	2–0	San Marino
Ševčík 11'; Líška 78'	Report

NTC Poprad, Poprad
Attendance: 105
Referee: Mehmet Türkmen (Turkey)

3 November 2025
12:00

Slovakia	1–1	Switzerland
Václavek 77'	Report	Ponik 90+1'

NTC Poprad, Poprad
Attendance: 100
Referee: Klym Zabroda (Ukraine)
3 November 2025
12:00

San Marino	0–5	Bulgaria
	Report	Angelov 2'; Grozdanov 27', 32'; Popov 41', 57' (pen.)

Mestský štadión, Spišská Nová Ves
Attendance: 25
Referee: Mehmet Türkmen (Turkey)

=== Group 11 ===
Pos	Team	Pld	W	D	L	GF	GA	GD	Pts	Qualification
1	Cyprus (H)	3	2	1	0	2	0	+2	7	Round 2 League A
2	Northern Ireland	3	1	2	0	3	2	+1	5	Round 2 League A
3	Finland	3	1	1	1	3	2	+1	4	Round 2 League B
4	Armenia	3	0	0	3	1	5	−4	0	Round 2 League B

Source: UEFA
Rules for classification: Tiebreakers
(H) Hosts
28 October 2025
10:00 (11:00 UTC+3)

Northern Ireland	2–1	Armenia
Tohill 21'; Kerr 40'	Report	Ghazaryan 45+2'

Sotira Municipal Stadium, Sotira
Attendance: 50
Referee: Márton Rúsz (Hungary)
28 October 2025
11:00 (12:00 UTC+3)

Cyprus	1–0	Finland
Gerasimou 73' (pen.)	Report

Ethnikos Achnas, Achna
Attendance: 250
Referee: Mervan Bejtullahu (Kosovo)

31 October 2025
10:00 (11:00 UTC+3)

Finland	2–0	Armenia
Mäkeläinen 51'; Salo 86'	Report

Sotira Municipal Stadium, Sotira
Attendance: 42
Referee: Mervan Bejtullahu (Kosovo)
31 October 2025
11:00 (12:00 UTC+3)

Northern Ireland	0–0	Cyprus
	Report

Ethnikos Achnas, Achna
Attendance: 240
Referee: Karel Rouček (Czech Republic)

3 November 2025
10:00 (11:00 UTC+3)

Finland	1–1	Northern Ireland
Mäkeläinen 49'	Report	Kerr 11'

Sotira Municipal Stadium, Sotira
Attendance: 30
Referee: Karel Rouček (Czech Republic)
3 November 2025
10:00 (11:00 UTC+3)

Armenia	0–1	Cyprus
	Report	Marneros 6'

Ethnikos Achnas, Achna
Attendance: 310
Referee: Márton Rúsz (Hungary)

=== Group 12 ===
Pos	Team	Pld	W	D	L	GF	GA	GD	Pts	Qualification
1	Portugal (H)	3	2	1	0	15	3	+12	7	Round 2 League A
2	Slovenia	3	2	0	1	9	5	+4	6	Round 2 League A
3	Wales	3	1	1	1	13	3	+10	4	Round 2 League B
4	Liechtenstein	3	0	0	3	0	26	−26	0	Round 2 League B

Source: UEFA
Rules for classification: Tiebreakers
(H) Hosts
12 November 2025
13:00

Wales	1–2	Slovenia
Pita 52'	Report	Matjašec 22'; Jereb 33'

Albufeira Municipal Stadium, Albufeira
Attendance: 45
Referee: Seth Galia (Gibraltar)
12 November 2025
16:00

Portugal	10–0	Liechtenstein
Ribeiro 15', 18', 47'; Constantino 61'; Fawler 65', 90+2'; Batista 71'; Semedo 74'; Ferreirinha 76', 81'	Report

Estádio Algarve, Faro-Loulé
Attendance: 85
Referee: Gal Levi (Israel)

15 November 2025
13:00

Slovenia	5–0	Liechtenstein
Primc 4'; Okanović 28', 58'; Koren 59'; Kotar 85'	Report

Albufeira Municipal Stadium, Albufeira
Attendance: 66
Referee: Gal Levi (Israel)
15 November 2025
15:00

Portugal	1–1	Wales
Semedo 62'	Report	Donczew 83'

Estádio de São Luís, Faro
Attendance: 216
Referee: Daniel Higraff (Norway)

18 November 2025
16:00

Slovenia	2–4	Portugal
Bogatinov 58'; Ferreira 71' (o.g.)	Report	Ferreirinha 28', 45+2'; Tomás 30'; Guerra 47'

Estádio Algarve, Faro-Loulé
Attendance: 146
Referee: Seth Galia (Gibraltar)
18 November 2025
16:00

Liechtenstein	0–11	Wales
	Report	Moreno 11' (pen.), 29', 45+4' (pen.); Norris 21', 33'; Lewis 45', 65'; Honorio 53' (o.g.); Scarlett 59'; Donczew 71' (pen.); Godfrey 90'

Albufeira Municipal Stadium, Albufeira
Attendance: 49
Referee: Daniel Higraff (Norway)

=== Group 13 ===
Pos	Team	Pld	W	D	L	GF	GA	GD	Pts	Qualification
1	Germany	2	2	0	0	8	1	+7	6	Round 2 League A
2	Poland	2	1	0	1	2	4	−2	3	Round 2 League A
3	Luxembourg (H)	2	0	0	2	0	5	−5	0	Round 2 League B

Source: UEFA
Rules for classification: Tiebreakers
(H) Hosts
8 October 2025
18:00

Germany	4–0	Luxembourg
Najdi 28'; Eichhorn 45', 84'; Veit 78'	Report

Kaerjenger Dribbel, Bascharage
Attendance: 852
Referee: Konstantinos Fellas (Cyprus)

11 October 2025
15:00

Poland	1–4	Germany
Zalewski 28'	Report	Seretis 9'; Najdi 43'; Mirza 54' (pen.), 68'

Stade Émile Mayrisch, Esch-sur-Alzette
Attendance: 155
Referee: Dalibor Černý (Czech Republic)

14 October 2025
18:00

Luxembourg	0–1	Poland
	Report	Smyrak 87'

Kaerjenger Dribbel, Bascharage
Attendance: 521
Referee: Alexandros Tsakalidis (Greece)

=== Group 14 ===
Pos	Team	Pld	W	D	L	GF	GA	GD	Pts	Qualification
1	Iceland	2	2	0	0	9	4	+5	6	Round 2 League A
2	Greece	2	1	0	1	5	5	0	3	Round 2 League A
3	Georgia (H)	2	0	0	2	2	7	−5	0	Round 2 League B

Source: UEFA
Rules for classification: Tiebreakers
(H) Hosts
24 October 2025
16:00 (18:00 UTC+4)

Iceland	5–1	Georgia
Guðjónsson 4', 85'; Pálmason 29'; Ingólfsson 45'; Garðarsson 71'	Report	Avdoevi 37'

Mikheil Meskhi Stadium, Tbilisi
Attendance: 900
Referee: Michele Beltrano (San Marino)

27 October 2025
12:00 (14:00 UTC+4)

Greece	3–4	Iceland
Nempis 7'; Moysiadis 40' (pen.); Souvlatzis 59'	Report	Garðarsson 6'; Guðjónsson 10', 25', 60'

David Petriashvili Stadium, Tbilisi
Attendance: 47
Referee: Sven Wolfensberger (Switzerland)

30 October 2025
15:00 (17:00 UTC+4)

Georgia	1–2	Greece
Bartishvili 49'	Report	Souvlatzis 56'; Papasarafianos 70'

Mikheil Meskhi Stadium, Tbilisi
Attendance: 500
Referee: Patryk Gryckiewicz (Poland)

== Round 2 ==
=== Draw ===
The draw for Round 2 was made at 12:15 CET on 10 December at the UEFA headquarters in Nyon, Switzerland.

The 28 teams of Round 1 (top 2 of each group) were drawn in seven groups of four teams in League A. The bottom two teams in groups of 4 teams, and the last ranked team in groups of 3 teams, were relegated to League B for Round 2.

The teams were seeded according to their results in Round 1 (Regulations Article 15.01).

==== Teams entering League A ====
Pot 1
Team	Pos. in group	Pts.	GD	GS	DP
Spain	1st / Group 4	6	9	9	
Czech Republic	1st / Group 2	6	8	9	
Belgium	1st / Group 5	6	8	8	
Germany	1st / Group 13	6	7	8	
Iceland	1st / Group 14	6	5	9	
Republic of Ireland	1st / Group 6	6	5	5	
Sweden	1st / Group 3	6	4	4	

Pot 2
Team	Pos. in group	Pts.	GD	GS	DP
Turkey	1st / Group 7	6	3	6	
France	1st / Group 9	4	5	6	
Portugal	1st / Group 12	4	2	5	
Montenegro	1st / Group 1	4	1	3	
Slovakia	1st / Group 10	4	1	2	
Cyprus	1st / Group 11	4	1	1	
Kazakhstan	1st / Group 8	3	−2	3	

Pot 3
Team	Pos. in group	Pts.	GD	GS	DP
Austria	2nd / Group 6	3	2	5	
Scotland	2nd / Group 3	3	1	4	
Greece	2nd / Group 14	3	0	5	
Croatia	2nd / Group 8	3	0	4	
Italy	2nd / Group 1	3	0	3	5
Serbia	2nd / Group 7	3	0	3	9
Slovenia	2nd / Group 12	3	−1	4	5 ^{1}

Pot 4
Team	Pos. in group	Pts.	GD	GS	DP
Norway	2nd / Group 5	3	−1	4	5 ^{1}
Poland	2nd / Group 13	3	−2	2	
Denmark	2nd / Group 4	3	−3	3	
Romania	2nd / Group 9	2	0	2	3
Switzerland	2nd / Group 10	2	0	2	6
Northern Ireland	2nd / Group 11	2	0	1	
North Macedonia	2nd / Group 2	1	−2	2	

^{1} – Slovenia and Norway were tied in all markers; the 2024/25 R2 overall rankings were used: Slovenia 12th, Norway 28th.

==== Teams entering League B ====
Pot 1
Team	Pos. in group	Pts.	GD	GS	DP
Netherlands	3rd / Group 8	3	2	6	
Ukraine	3rd / Group 1	1	−1	2	4
Wales	3rd / Group 12	1	−1	2	7
Finland	3rd / Group 11	1	−1	1	2
Bulgaria	3rd / Group 10	1	−1	1	10
Israel	3rd / Group 9	1	−5	1	
Hungary	3rd / Group 2	1	−6	3	

Pot 2
Team	Pos. in group	Pts.	GD	GS	DP
Bosnia and Herzegovina	3rd / Group 7	0	−3	1	
Georgia	3rd / Group 14	0	−5	2	
Lithuania	3rd / Group 3	0	−5	1	
Luxembourg	3rd / Group 13	0	−5	0	
Latvia	3rd / Group 4	0	−6	2	
Belarus	3rd / Group 5	0	−7	3	
Faroe Islands	3rd / Group 6	0	−7	1	

Pot 3
Team	Pos. in group	Pts.	GD	GS	DP
Albania	4th / Group 8	1	−4	2	
Moldova	4th / Group 5	1	−7	1	
Malta	4th / Group 7	1	−9	2	
Kosovo	4th / Group 6	0	−4	5	
England	4th / Group 3	0	−4	3	
Armenia	4th / Group 11	0	−4	1	
San Marino	4th / Group 10	0	−9	0	

Pot 4
Team	Pos. in group	Pts.	GD	GS	DP
Andorra	4th / Group 4	0	−10	2	
Estonia	4th / Group 1	0	−10	1	
Azerbaijan	4th / Group 9	0	−16	2	
Liechtenstein	4th / Group 12	0	−26	0	
Gibraltar	4th / Group 2	0	−30	0	

=== League A ===
Times are CET/CEST, (Note: CET (UTC+1) for dates up to 26 March 2023, and CEST (UTC+2) for dates thereafter.) as listed by UEFA (local times, if different, are in parentheses).

==== Group A1 ====
Pos	Team	Pld	W	D	L	GF	GA	GD	Pts	Promotion
1	France	3	3	0	0	6	1	+5	9	Qualified for the final tournament and 2026 FIFA U-17 World Cup
2	Slovenia (H)	3	1	1	1	5	3	+2	4	
3	Germany	3	1	1	1	3	4	−1	4	
4	North Macedonia	3	0	0	3	2	8	−6	0	Relegation to League B Round 1 of the 2027/2028 season for respective U-19 team

Source: UEFA
Rules for classification: Qualification tiebreakers
(H) Hosts
25 March 2026
16:00

Germany	2–1	North Macedonia
Mirza 3'; Veit 25'	Report	Dzangarovski 63'

Športni park Brinje, Grosuplje
Referee: David Rafael Oliveira Da Silva (Portugal)
25 March 2026
16:00

Slovenia	0–2	France
	Report	Gadou 63'; Dago 76'

Športni park Radomlje, Radomlje
Referee: Mateo Busquets Ferrer (Spain)

28 March 2026
16:00

Germany	1–1	Slovenia
Lemke 64'	Report	Matjašec 52'

Športni park Radomlje, Radomlje
Referee: Jan Všetečka (Czechia)
28 March 2026
16:00

France	2–1	North Macedonia
Loufoundou 23'; Amaaouch 63'	Report	Dzangarovski 22' (pen.)

Športni park Brinje, Grosuplje
Referee: David Rafael Oliveira Da Silva (Portugal)

31 March 2026
16:30

France	2–0	Germany
Loufoundou 70'; Gadou 84'	Report

Športni park Radomlje, Radomlje
Referee: Mateo Busquets Ferrer (Spain)
31 March 2026
16:30

North Macedonia	0–4	Slovenia
	Report	Jereb 11', 82'; Balažic 43'; Robin 90+2'

NNC Brdo, Kranj
Referee: Jan Všetečka (Czechia)

==== Group A2 ====
Pos	Team	Pld	W	D	L	GF	GA	GD	Pts	Promotion
1	Italy (H)	3	3	0	0	9	3	+6	9	Qualified for the final tournament and 2026 FIFA U-17 World Cup
2	Romania	3	2	0	1	7	4	+3	6	Qualified for the 2026 FIFA U-17 World Cup
3	Iceland	3	1	0	2	4	10	−6	3	
4	Portugal	3	0	0	3	3	6	−3	0	Relegation to League B Round 1 of the 2027/2028 season for respective U-19 team

Source: UEFA
Rules for classification: Qualification tiebreakers
25 March 2026
14:00

Iceland	2–5	Romania
Kárason 44'; Martin 69'	Report	Bota 22'; Goncear 30', 34'; Tripon 51'; Precup 57' (pen.)

Carlo Angelo Luzi, Gualdo Tadino
Referee: Duncan Nicolson (Scotland)
25 March 2026
15:00

Italy	3–2	Portugal
Perillo 46'; Okon 51'; Landi 75'	Report	Guerra 11'; Ferreirinha 15'

Stadio Pietro Barbetti, Gubbio
Referee: Lasse Læbel Graagaard (Denmark)

28 March 2026
12:00

Portugal	0–1	Romania
	Report	Tripon 34'

Carlo Angelo Luzi, Gualdo Tadino
Referee: Oguzhan Çakir (Turkey)
28 March 2026
15:00

Iceland	0–4	Italy
	Report	Perillo 7', 37'; Biondini 25'; Corigliano 38'

Stadio Renato Curi, Perugia
Referee: Lasse Læbel Graagaard (Denmark)

31 March 2026
18:00

Portugal	1–2	Iceland
Guerra 48'	Report	Ingólfsson 40'; Guðjónsson 90+2'

Stadio Renato Curi, Perugia
Referee: Duncan Nicolson (Scotland)
31 March 2026
18:00

Romania	1–2	Italy
Matei 85'	Report	Fugazzola 26'; Perillo 41'

Stadio Pietro Barbetti, Gubbio
Referee: Oguzhan Çakir (Turkey)

==== Group A3 ====
Pos	Team	Pld	W	D	L	GF	GA	GD	Pts	Promotion
1	Montenegro (H)	3	2	0	1	5	5	0	6	Qualified for the final tournament and 2026 FIFA U-17 World Cup
2	Greece	3	2	0	1	4	3	+1	6	Qualified for the 2026 FIFA U-17 World Cup
3	Sweden	3	1	1	1	9	5	+4	4	
4	Norway	3	0	1	2	2	7	−5	1	Relegation to League B Round 1 of the 2027/2028 season for respective U-19 team

Source: UEFA
Rules for classification: Qualification tiebreakers
25 March 2026
12:00

Greece	0–1	Montenegro
	Report	Vušurović 67'

Stadion Topolica, Bar
Referee: Ihar Shumilau (Belarus)
25 March 2026
15:00

Sweden	2–2	Norway
Bardghji 58'; Persson 67'	Report	Johnsen 29'; Hillestad 44'

Stadion Olympic, Ulcinj
Referee: Eldorjan Hamiti (Albania)

28 March 2026
15:00

Sweden	2–3	Greece
Bryhn 61'; Imeri 90+3'	Report	Kalpakis 3'; Hidalgo 76' (o.g.); Siozios 90+5'

Stadion Olympic, Ulcinj
Referee: Ryan Lee (Scotland)
28 March 2026
15:00

Montenegro	4–0	Norway
Đukić 50', 82'; Čukić 56'; Caušević 89'	Report

Stadion Topolica, Bar
Referee: Ihar Shumilau (Belarus)

31 March 2026
15:00

Montenegro	0–5	Sweden
	Report	Hidalgo 25'; Persson 39'; Nedić 45' (o.g.); Månsson 63'; Bardghji 82'

Stadion Topolica, Bar
Referee: Ryan Lee (Scotland)
31 March 2026
15:00

Norway	0–1	Greece
	Report	Tsigkas 32'

Stadion Olympic, Ulcinj
Referee: Eldorjan Hamiti (Albania)

==== Group A4 ====
Pos	Team	Pld	W	D	L	GF	GA	GD	Pts	Promotion
1	Denmark (H)	3	2	1	0	10	3	+7	7	Qualified for the final tournament and 2026 FIFA U-17 World Cup
2	Czech Republic	3	1	2	0	5	3	+2	5	
3	Austria	3	0	2	1	3	7	−4	2	
4	Kazakhstan	3	0	1	2	1	6	−5	1	Relegation to League B Round 1 of the 2027/2028 season for respective U-19 team

Source: UEFA
Rules for classification: Qualification tiebreakers
25 March 2026
12:00

Austria	0–0	Kazakhstan
	Report

Helsingør Stadium, Helsingør
Referee: Miloš Bošković (Montenegro)
25 March 2026
17:00

Czech Republic	1–1	Denmark
Azaka 32'	Report	Chukwuani 81'

Helsingør Stadium, Helsingør
Referee: Ashot Ghaltakhchyan (Armenia)

28 March 2026
12:00

Czech Republic	1–1	Austria
Marek 16'	Report	Aleksic 86' (pen.)

Helsingør Stadium, Helsingør
Referee: Anojen Kanagasingam (Switzerland)
28 March 2026
17:00

Kazakhstan	0–3	Denmark
	Report	Khatar 21' (pen.), 39'; Hansen 69'

Helsingør Stadium, Helsingør
Referee: Ashot Ghaltakhchyan (Armenia)

31 March 2026
15:00

Kazakhstan	1–3	Czech Republic
Rakym 36' (pen.)	Report	Marek 11'; Azaka 82'; Srb 88'

Helsingør Stadium, Helsingør
Referee: Anojen Kanagasingam (Switzerland)
31 March 2026
15:00

Denmark	6–2	Austria
Khatar 17'; Chukwuani 37'; Mortensen 41'; Hansen 43'; Nasnas 56'; Stojanovic 90+2'	Report	Karner 76'; M'Bock 88'

Brøndby Stadium, Brøndby
Referee: Miloš Bošković (Montenegro)

==== Group A5 ====
Pos	Team	Pld	W	D	L	GF	GA	GD	Pts	Promotion
1	Belgium	3	3	0	0	7	4	+3	9	Qualified for the final tournament and 2026 FIFA U-17 World Cup
2	Serbia (H)	3	2	0	1	8	5	+3	6	Qualified for the 2026 FIFA U-17 World Cup
3	Switzerland	3	1	0	2	3	4	−1	3	
4	Cyprus	3	0	0	3	1	6	−5	0	Relegation to League B Round 1 of the 2027/2028 season for respective U-19 team

Source: UEFA
Rules for classification: Qualification tiebreakers
25 March 2026
11:00

Belgium	2–1	Switzerland
Onia Seke 18'; Kamara 90+1'	Report	Ocran 58'

Voždovac Stadium, Belgrade
Referee: Aaron O’Dowd (Ireland)
25 March 2026
17:00

Serbia	3–1	Cyprus
Marinković 64'; Matanović 83', 86'	Report	Gerasimou 81'

SRC Mladost Pančevo, Pančevo
Referee: Dovydas Švėgžda (Lithuania)

28 March 2026
11:00

Cyprus	0–2	Switzerland
	Report	Smajic 2'; Bajraktar 62'

Voždovac Stadium, Belgrade
Referee: Tom Owen (Wales)
28 March 2026
17:00

Belgium	4–3	Serbia
Onia Seke 3'; Benktib 40'; Achahbar 47', 66'	Report	Fekete 50'; Anokić 58'; Samardzic 83'

SRC Mladost Pančevo, Pančevo
Referee: Dovydas Švėgžda (Lithuania)

31 March 2026
16:00

Cyprus	0–1	Belgium
	Report	Onia Seke 83'

Voždovac Stadium, Belgrade
Referee: Aaron O’Dowd (Ireland)
31 March 2026
16:00

Switzerland	0–2	Serbia
	Report	Anokić 15'; Rece 87'

SRC Mladost Pančevo, Pančevo
Referee: Tom Owen (Wales)

==== Group A6 ====
Pos	Team	Pld	W	D	L	GF	GA	GD	Pts	Promotion
1	Spain	3	2	1	0	5	0	+5	7	Qualified for the final tournament and 2026 FIFA U-17 World Cup
2	Scotland	3	2	0	1	4	4	0	6	
3	Turkey	3	1	1	1	4	2	+2	4	
4	Northern Ireland (H)	3	0	0	3	1	8	−7	0	Relegation to League B Round 1 of the 2027/2028 season for respective U-19 team

Source: UEFA
Rules for classification: Qualification tiebreakers
15 March 2026
13:00

Scotland	2–0	Turkey
Crombie 32'; Cadamarteri 45+1'	Report

The Showgrounds, Coleraine
Referee: Luca Zufferli (Italy)
15 March 2026
19:00

Spain	2–0	Northern Ireland
Alves 19'; Imga 83' (pen.)	Report

The Showgrounds, Coleraine
Referee: Márton Rúsz (Hungary)

18 March 2026
13:00

Spain	3–0	Scotland
Tunkara 10'; Tomás 33'; Mikel 44'	Report

The Showgrounds, Coleraine
Referee: Lukáš Dzivjak (Slovakia)
18 March 2026
19:00

Turkey	4–0	Northern Ireland
Tosun 15'; Yançel 22'; Erdogan 48'; Şen 51' (pen.)	Report

The Showgrounds, Coleraine
Referee: Márton Rúsz (Hungary)

21 March 2026
15:00

Turkey	0–0	Spain
	Report

Solitude, Belfast
Referee: Luca Zufferli (Italy)
21 March 2026
15:00

Northern Ireland	1–2	Scotland
Mcgarry 13'	Report	Cadamarteri 10'; Douglas 85'

The Showgrounds, Coleraine
Referee: Lukáš Dzivjak (Slovakia)

==== Group A7 ====
Pos	Team	Pld	W	D	L	GF	GA	GD	Pts	Promotion
1	Croatia	3	2	1	0	8	3	+5	7	Qualified for the final tournament and 2026 FIFA U-17 World Cup
2	Republic of Ireland	3	2	0	1	10	2	+8	6	Qualified for the 2026 FIFA U-17 World Cup
3	Poland (H)	3	1	1	1	5	4	+1	4	
4	Slovakia	3	0	0	3	2	16	−14	0	Relegation to League B Round 1 of the 2027/2028 season for respective U-19 team

Source: UEFA
Rules for classification: Qualification tiebreakers
25 March 2026
14:00

Croatia	5–2	Slovakia
Škafar 30'; Dedić 33', 43'; Benkotić 40' (pen.); Cingel 84' (o.g.)	Report	Tomáško 28' (pen.); Prekop 90+2'

Odra Opole, Opole
Referee: Ioannis Christodoulou (Cyprus)
25 March 2026
15:00

Republic of Ireland	3–0	Poland
Murphy 45+1'; Byrne 48'; Sheridan 84'	Report

MOSiR Brzeg, Brzeg
Referee: Yura Mahtesyan (Armenia)

28 March 2026
13:00

Slovakia	0–4	Poland
	Report	Buchta 5'; Szywała 6', 55' (pen.); Zalewski 57'

MOSiR Brzeg, Brzeg
Referee: Yura Mahtesyan (Armenia)
28 March 2026
13:30

Republic of Ireland	0–2	Croatia
	Report	Dedić 9', 29'

Odra Opole, Opole
Referee: Miloš Savović (Montenegro)

31 March 2026
16:00

Slovakia	0–7	Republic of Ireland
	Report	Murphy 8', 20', 39'; Sheridan 29'; Harpur 55'; Wuna 61' (pen.); Armstrong 75'

MOSiR Brzeg, Brzeg
Referee: Miloš Savović (Montenegro)
31 March 2026
16:00

Poland	1–1	Croatia
Buchta 38'	Report	Dedić 73'

Itaka Arena, Opole
Referee: Ioannis Christodoulou (Cyprus)

=== Ranking of second-placed teams ===
Pos	Grp	Team	Pld	W	D	L	GF	GA	GD	Pts	Qualification
1	A7	Republic of Ireland	3	2	0	1	10	2	+8	6	Qualified for the 2026 FIFA U-17 World Cup
2	A5	Serbia	3	2	0	1	8	5	+3	6	Qualified for the 2026 FIFA U-17 World Cup
3	A2	Romania	3	2	0	1	7	4	+3	6	Qualified for the 2026 FIFA U-17 World Cup
4	A3	Greece	3	2	0	1	4	3	+1	6	Qualified for the 2026 FIFA U-17 World Cup
5	A6	Scotland	3	2	0	1	4	4	0	6	
6	A4	Czech Republic	3	1	2	0	5	3	+2	5	
7	A1	Slovenia	3	1	1	1	5	3	+2	4	

Source: UEFA
Rules for classification: 1) points; 2) goal difference; 3) goals scored; 4) disciplinary points; 5) coefficient ranking.

=== League B ===
==== Group B1 ====
Pos	Team	Pld	W	D	L	GF	GA	GD	Pts	Promotion
1	Israel	3	3	0	0	9	1	+8	9	Promoted to League A for the Round 1 of the 2028 UEFA European Under-19 Championship qualification
2	England (H)	3	2	0	1	6	3	+3	6	
3	Faroe Islands	3	1	0	2	2	8	−6	3	
4	Estonia	3	0	0	3	1	6	−5	0	

Source: UEFA
Rules for classification: Qualification tiebreakers
25 March 2026
15:00 (14:00 UTC+00:00)

England	3–0	Faroe Islands
Kavuma-McQueen 11', 19'; Higgins 90+1'	Report

St George's Park National Football Centre, Burton upon Trent
Referee: Bálint Kišš (Slovakia)
25 March 2026
20:00 (19:00 UTC+00:00)

Israel	2–0	Estonia
Goldenberg 8'; Ghanayim 90+1'	Report

St George's Park National Football Centre, Burton upon Trent
Referee: Arnes Talic (Austria)

28 March 2026
15:00 (14:00 UTC+00:00)

Israel	3–1	England
Didi 34'; Yossef 57'; Dadia 67'	Report	Kavuma-McQueen 48'

St George's Park National Football Centre, Burton upon Trent
Referee: Oscar Johnson (Sweden)
28 March 2026
20:00 (19:00 UTC+00:00)

Faroe Islands	2–1	Estonia
Danielsen 45+1', 55'	Report	Kaares 45+3'

St George's Park National Football Centre, Burton upon Trent
Referee: Arnes Talic (Austria)

31 March 2026
14:00 (13:00 UTC+00:00)

Faroe Islands	0–4	Israel
	Report	Shushan 16' (pen.); Dadia 42'; Abihazira 58'; Ghanayim 79'

St George's Park National Football Centre, Burton upon Trent
Referee: Bálint Kišš (Slovakia)
31 March 2026
14:00 (13:00 UTC+00:00)

Estonia	0–2	England
	Report	Lamb 69'; Higgins 90'

St George's Park National Football Centre, Burton upon Trent
Referee: Oscar Johnson (Sweden)

==== Group B2 ====
Pos	Team	Pld	W	D	L	GF	GA	GD	Pts	Promotion
1	Bulgaria (H)	3	2	1	0	5	1	+4	7	Promoted to League A for the Round 1 of the 2028 UEFA European Under-19 Championship qualification
2	Lithuania	3	1	1	1	3	4	−1	4	
3	Azerbaijan	3	0	3	0	3	3	0	3	
4	Malta	3	0	1	2	3	6	−3	1	

Source: UEFA
Rules for classification: Qualification tiebreakers
24 March 2026
10:00

Malta	1–3	Lithuania
Attard 78' (pen.)	Report	Pocius 55'; Zubavičius 62'; Valatkevičius 90+2'

Nikola Shterev - Starika Sports Complex, Plovdiv
Referee: Ozan Ergün (Turkey)
24 March 2026
14:00

Bulgaria	1–1	Azerbaijan
Grozdanov 31'	Report	Bashirov 39' (pen.)

Stadion Hristo Botev, Plovdiv
Referee: Mateo Tozan (Slovenia)

27 March 2026
10:00

Lithuania	0–0	Azerbaijan
	Report

Nikola Shterev - Starika Sports Complex, Plovdiv
Referee: Ozan Ergün (Turkey)
27 March 2026
14:00

Bulgaria	1–0	Malta
Grozdanov 33'	Report

Stadion Hristo Botev, Plovdiv
Referee: Trpchevski Stojancho (North Macedonia)

30 March 2026
12:00

Lithuania	0–3	Bulgaria
	Report	Beykov 1'; Lazarov 66'; Deyanski 84'

Stadion Georgi Benkovski, Pazardjik
Referee: Mateo Tozan (Slovenia)
30 March 2026
12:00

Azerbaijan	2–2	Malta
Bashirov 57'; Debono 72' (o.g.)	Report	Roe 2'; Zammit 51'

Nikola Shterev - Starika Sports Complex, Plovdiv
Referee: Trpchevski Stojancho (North Macedonia)

==== Group B3 ====
Pos	Team	Pld	W	D	L	GF	GA	GD	Pts	Promotion
1	Georgia	3	2	1	0	7	3	+4	7	Promoted to League A for the Round 1 of the 2028 UEFA European Under-19 Championship qualification
2	Andorra	3	1	1	1	3	2	+1	4	
3	San Marino (H)	3	1	0	2	3	7	−4	3	
4	Wales	3	0	2	1	2	3	−1	2	

Source: UEFA
Rules for classification: Qualification tiebreakers
11 April 2026
11:00

Wales	0–0	Andorra
	Report

Acquaviva Stadium, Acquaviva
Referee: Lukáš Dzivjak (Slovakia)
11 April 2026
11:00

San Marino	1–4	Georgia
Ciacci 58'	Report	Jourdain 21' (o.g.); Mikautadze 62'; Gazdeliani 67'; Jamarauli 90'

Stadio Ezio Conti di Dogana, Dogana
Referee: Cihan Aydın (Türkiye)

14 April 2026
11:00

Wales	0–1	San Marino
	Report	Montali 63'

Stadio Ezio Conti di Dogana, Dogana
Referee: Fotios Polychronis (Greece)
14 April 2026
11:00

Georgia	1–0	Andorra
Kuntchulia 42'	Report

Acquaviva Stadium, Acquaviva
Referee: Lukáš Dzivjak (Slovakia)

17 April 2026
11:00

Georgia	2–2	Wales
Avdoevi 23'; Khatoyan 72'	Report	Norris 20'; Papirnyk 90+1'

Acquaviva Stadium, Acquaviva
Referee: Fotios Polychronis (Greece)
17 April 2026
11:00

Andorra	3–1	San Marino
Sanchez 4'; Martinez 45+1'; Frau 76'	Report	Pala 79'

Stadio Ezio Conti di Dogana, Dogana
Referee: Cihan Aydın (Türkiye)

==== Group B4 ====
Pos	Team	Pld	W	D	L	GF	GA	GD	Pts	Promotion
1	Finland	3	2	1	0	6	2	+4	7	Promoted to League A for the Round 1 of the 2028 UEFA European Under-19 Championship qualification
2	Moldova (H)	3	1	2	0	7	0	+7	5	
3	Bosnia and Herzegovina	3	1	1	1	6	3	+3	4	
4	Gibraltar	3	0	0	3	0	14	−14	0	

Source: UEFA
Rules for classification: Qualification tiebreakers
23 April 2026
10:00

Finland	3–0	Gibraltar
Meltoranta 74'; Barret 85'; Mäkeläinen 90+1'	Report

Stadionul CPSM, Vadul lui Vodă
Attendance: 50
Referee: Robin Hensgens (The Netherlands)
23 April 2026
12:00

Moldova	0–0	Bosnia and Herzegovina
	Report

Zimbru Stadium, Chișinău
Attendance: 64
Referee: Benjamin Brand (Germany)

26 April 2026
10:00

Bosnia and Herzegovina	4–0	Gibraltar
Milijević 20'; Perera Vinent 24' (o.g.); Korora 31'; Đerić 39'	Report

Stadionul CPSM, Vadul lui Vodă
Referee: Andreu Simarro (Andorra)
26 April 2026
12:00

Finland	0–0	Moldova
	Report

Zimbru Stadium, Chișinău
Referee: Robin Hensgens (The Netherlands)

29 April 2026
12:00

Bosnia and Herzegovina	2–3	Finland
Korora 47' (pen.), 66'	Report	Mendolin 41'; Kroupkin 51'; Helander 53'

Stadionul CPSM, Vadul lui Vodă
Referee: Benjamin Brand (Germany)
29 April 2026
12:00

Gibraltar	0–7	Moldova
	Report	Ciuchin 14'; Ceaciru 16', 37', 48', 90+7'; Rosioru 41'; Turetchi 68'

Zimbru Stadium, Chișinău
Referee: Andreu Simarro (Andorra)

==== Group B5 ====
Pos	Team	Pld	W	D	L	GF	GA	GD	Pts	Promotion
1	Hungary	3	3	0	0	8	1	+7	9	Promoted to League A for the Round 1 of the 2028 UEFA European Under-19 Championship qualification
2	Luxembourg	3	1	1	1	7	3	+4	4	
3	Armenia (H)	3	1	1	1	5	6	−1	4	
4	Liechtenstein	3	0	0	3	1	11	−10	0	

Source: UEFA
Rules for classification: Qualification tiebreakers
22 April 2026
11:00

Hungary	4–0	Liechtenstein
Somogyi 26'; Szakál 45+1'; Vasiljevic 78'; Wiesner 90+4' (pen.)	Report

Yerevan Football Academy Stadium, Yerevan
Referee: Alex Johnson (Malta)
22 April 2026
14:00

Armenia	2–2	Luxembourg
Arakelyan 63'; Yervandyan 65'	Report	Martins 19'; Elombo 33'

Vazgen Sargsyan Republican Stadium, Yerevan
Referee: Kristaps Ratnieks (Latvia)

25 April 2026
11:00

Luxembourg	5–0	Liechtenstein
Moreira 49'; Elombo 61' (pen.); Nascimento 66' (pen.); Macedo 68'; Rodrigues 76'	Report

Yerevan Football Academy Stadium, Yerevan
Referee: Alex Johnson (Malta)
25 April 2026
14:00

Hungary	3–1	Armenia
Berekméri-Szigeti 22'; Vincze 31'; Wiesner 50'	Report	Arakelyan 67'

Vazgen Sargsyan Republican Stadium, Yerevan
Referee: Patryk Gryckiewicz (Poland)

28 April 2026
14:00

Luxembourg	0–1	Hungary
	Report	Berekméri-Szigeti 38'

Yerevan Football Academy Stadium, Yerevan
Referee: Patryk Gryckiewicz (Poland)
28 April 2026
14:00

Liechtenstein	1–2	Armenia
Wolf 77'	Report	Yervandyan 12', 90+7' (pen.)

Vazgen Sargsyan Republican Stadium, Yerevan
Referee: Kristaps Ratnieks (Latvia)

==== Group B6 ====
Pos	Team	Pld	W	D	L	GF	GA	GD	Pts	Promotion
1	Latvia	2	1	1	0	5	4	+1	4	Promoted to League A for the Round 1 of the 2028 UEFA European Under-19 Championship qualification
2	Ukraine	2	1	0	1	6	3	+3	3	
3	Albania (H)	2	0	1	1	2	6	−4	1	

Source: UEFA
Rules for classification: Qualification tiebreakers
3 June 2026
17:00

Latvia	2–2	Albania
Baltrušaitis 2'; Blūms 88'	Report	Muslika 19' (pen.), 81'

Egnatia Arena, Rrogozhinë
Attendance: 300
Referee: Artem Gasparyan (Armenia)

6 June 2026
17:00

Ukraine	2–3	Latvia
Huram 11'; Dziurynets 48'	Report	Menniks 53' (pen.); Baltrušaitis 65'; Ščerbinskis 90+6'

Egnatia Arena, Rrogozhinë
Attendance: 50
Referee: Mathias Støfringshaug (Norway)

9 June 2026
17:00

Albania	0–4	Ukraine
	Report	Dziurynets 42'; Voloshko 57'; Pylypchuk 63'; Cappellato 83'

Egnatia Arena, Rrogozhinë
Referee: Karel Rouček (Czech Republic)

==== Group B7 ====
The matches will be played at a neutral venue in Antalya, Turkey.

Pos	Team	Pld	W	D	L	GF	GA	GD	Pts	Promotion
1	Netherlands	2	2	0	0	3	1	+2	6	Promoted to League A for the Round 1 of the 2028 UEFA European Under-19 Championship qualification
2	Belarus	2	1	0	1	2	2	0	3	
3	Kosovo	2	0	0	2	0	2	−2	0	

Source: UEFA
Rules for classification: Qualification tiebreakers
25 March 2026
17:00

Kosovo	0–1	Netherlands
	Report	Van Der Lijcke 90+4'

Mardan Sports Complex, Antalya
Referee: Aaron Wyn Jones (Wales)

28 March 2026
17:00

Belarus	1–0	Kosovo
Sanko 3'	Report

Mardan Sports Complex, Antalya
Referee: Ilioski Vlatko (North Macedonia)

31 March 2026
14:00

Netherlands	2–1	Belarus
Abdalla 17'; Schaken 21'	Report	Karpovich 35'

Mardan Sports Complex, Antalya
Referee: Tural Kurbanov (Azerbaijan)

== Goalscorers ==
In Round 1, there were 319 goals scored in 78 matches, for an average of 4.09 goals per match.

In Round 2, there were 241 goals scored in 78 matches, for an average of 3.09 goals per match.

In total, there were 560 goals scored in 156 matches, for an average of 3.59 goals per match.

6 goals

- (Iceland) Alexander Guðjónsson
- (Italy) Diego Perillo

5 goals

- (Belgium) Kiyan Achahbar
- (Croatia) Jakov Dedić
- (Czech Republic) Lewis Azaka
- (Czech Republic) Matouš Srb
- (Denmark) Mikkel Bro Hansen
- (France) Arone Gadou
- (North Macedonia) Martin Dzangarovski
- (Portugal) Afonso Ferreirinha
- (Scotland) Caelan Cadamarteri
- (Sweden) Rayan Bardghji

4 goals

- (Bosnia and Herzegovina) Aldian Korora
- (Bulgaria) Anrdey Grozdanov
- (Czech Republic) Filip Zahálka
- (Hungary) Tamás Somogyi
- (Moldova) Nicolae Ceaciru
- (Republic of Ireland) Cillian Murphy
- (Serbia) Ognjen Matanović
- (Spain) Ebrima Tunkara
- (Turkey) Tarik Buğra Kalpakli

3 goals

- (Albania) Armend Muslika
- (Armenia) Andranik Yervandyan
- (Austria) Joseph M'Bock
- (Azerbaijan) Ali Bashirov
- (Belarus) Tsimafei Hudach
- (Belgium) Xander Dierckx
- (Belgium) Jayden Onia Seke
- (Czech Republic) Jakub Marek
- (Czech Republic) Viktor Švec
- (Denmark) Omran Khatar
- (England) Ryan Kavuma-McQueen
- (Faroe Islands) Markus Danielsen
- (Finland) Juuso Mäkeläinen
- (France) Aymen Amaaouch
- (France) Aly Traore
- (Germany) Marwan-Omir Mirza
- (Hungary) Levente Bősze
- (Israel) Idan Dadia
- (Italy) Thomas Corigliano
- (Netherlands) Mohamed Abdalla
- (Netherlands) Jerayno Ricardo Neville Schaken
- (North Macedonia) Vasko Papaliski
- (Portugal) Gustavo Guerra
- (Portugal) Martim Ribeiro
- (Republic of Ireland) Ben Mahon
- (Romania) Andrei Niculcea
- (Serbia) Dragan Anokić
- (Slovenia) David Jereb
- (Spain) Santiago Del Pino
- (Sweden) Dion Mehmeti
- (Turkey) Ali Demirbilek
- (Turkey) Yağiz Fikri Şen
- (Wales) Paul Moreno
- (Wales) Jacob Gareth Norris

2 goals

- (Armenia) Arsen Arakelyan
- (Austria) Filip Aleksic
- (Austria) Edin Jakupi
- (Austria) Luca Mijatovic
- (Belarus) Nikita Sanko
- (Belarus) Uladzislau Varonin
- (Belgium) Ilyas Benktib
- (Belgium) Al-Hassan Kamara
- (Bulgaria) Nikolay Popov
- (Croatia) Luka Bartolović
- (Croatia) Juraj Frigan
- (Croatia) Nik Žužić Škafar
- (Czech Republic) Dominik Cvejn
- (Denmark) Ekene Chukwuani
- (Denmark) Mads Meedom Jørgensen
- (England) Harvey Higgins
- (England) Brian Madjo
- (Faroe Islands) Dennis Anghel
- (France) Christ Batola
- (France) Joshua Dago
- (France) Noah Loufoundou
- (France) Loan Merrifield
- (Georgia (country)) Saba Avdoevi
- (Germany) Kennet Eichhorn
- (Germany) Ahmad Najdi
- (Germany) Jannik Veit
- (Greece) Konstantinos Souvlatzis
- (Hungary) Ákos Berekméri-Szigeti
- (Hungary) Noel Polonkai
- (Hungary) Balázs Wiesner
- (Iceland) Bjarki Garðarsson
- (Iceland) Þorri Ingólfsson
- (Israel) Tamir Bar
- (Israel) Erez Didi
- (Israel) Foad Ghanayim
- (Italy) Marcello Fugazzola
- (Italy) Gioele Giammattei
- (Kazakhstan) Islam Rakym
- (Kosovo) Arjon Llugaxhiu
- (Kosovo) Unejs Mustafa
- (Latvia) Deivids Baltrušaitis
- (Latvia) Miķelis Krišjānis Menniks
- (Latvia) Aleks Ščerbinskis
- (Latvia) Ņikita Solomonovs
- (Lithuania) Vėjas Pocius
- (Luxembourg) Charel Elombo
- (Malta) Denzel Attard
- (Malta) Jayden Roe
- (Montenegro) Blažo Đukić
- (Montenegro) Petar Vujović
- (Montenegro) Luka Vušurović
- (Netherlands) Donny Van Der Lijcke
- (Northern Ireland) Joel Kerr
- (Norway) Abel Cedergren
- (Norway) Patrik Tørset Johnsen
- (Poland) Philip Buchta
- (Poland) Bartosz Szywała
- (Poland) Zachary Zalewski
- (Portugal) Lamine Fawler
- (Portugal) Andreson Semedo
- (Republic of Ireland) Ryan Sheridan
- (Romania) Alexandru Goncear
- (Romania) Ryan Rusu
- (Romania) Darius Tripon
- (Scotland) Luke Douglas
- (Serbia) William Millwood Rece
- (Slovakia) Šimon Ševčík
- (Slovenia) Miha Matjašec
- (Slovenia) Deen Okanović
- (Spain) Enzo Alves
- (Spain) Roberto Tomás
- (Sweden) Alexander Odefalk
- (Sweden) Lucas Persson
- (Switzerland) Euron Bajraktar
- (Switzerland) Aldin Smajic
- (Ukraine) Oleh Dziurynets
- (Ukraine) Kirill Serdiuk
- (Wales) Axel Donczew
- (Wales) Bobby Lewis

1 goal

- (Albania) Dion Vata
- (Andorra) Ramon Barral
- (Andorra) Fernandez Frau
- (Andorra) Huguet Martinez
- (Andorra) Unai Subiros Moreno
- (Andorra) Soriano Sanchez
- (Armenia) Armen Ghazaryan
- (Austria) Nico Berger
- (Austria) Jan Karner
- (Austria) Fabio Schreiber
- (Azerbaijan) Samir Sharifov
- (Belarus) Maxim Karpovich
- (Belarus) Danila Liavonenka
- (Belarus) Marat Tsitou
- (Belarus) Anatoli Yastachkin
- (Belgium) Joshua Nga Kana
- (Bosnia and Herzegovina) Vladan Đerić
- (Bosnia and Herzegovina) Damjan Jovic
- (Bosnia and Herzegovina) Svetozar Milijević
- (Bosnia and Herzegovina) Luka Vulin
- (Bulgaria) Ernan Angelov
- (Bulgaria) Victor Beykov
- (Bulgaria) Kaloyan Deyanski
- (Bulgaria) Maksimilian Lazarov
- (Croatia) Ante Beljan
- (Croatia) Jona Benkotić
- (Croatia) Matej Miličić
- (Cyprus) David Gerasimou
- (Cyprus) Christodoulos Marneros
- (Czech Republic) Jakub Cáhlik
- (Czech Republic) Nicolas Chumlen
- (Czech Republic) Aleksa Ilinčič
- (Czech Republic) André Thomas Sivok
- (Denmark) Malthe Mortensen
- (Denmark) Marvin Nasnas
- (Denmark) Benjamin Staack Nicolaisen
- (Denmark) David Stojanovic
- (Denmark) Frederik Vestergaard
- (England) Oliver Boast
- (England) Teddie Lamb
- (Estonia) Andero Kaares
- (Estonia) Aston Visse
- (Faroe Islands) Tummas Jákupsonur Joensen
- (Finland) Ruben Barret
- (Finland) Lucas Helander
- (Finland) Nicklas Kroupkin
- (Finland) Nestori Meltoranta
- (Finland) Rasmus Mendolin
- (Finland) Samuel Salo
- (France) Believe Munongo
- (Georgia (country)) Andria Bartishvili
- (Georgia (country)) Rezo Gazdeliani
- (Georgia (country)) Giorgi Jamarauli
- (Georgia (country)) Nika Khatoyan
- (Georgia (country)) Aleksandre Kuntchulia
- (Georgia (country)) Sandro Mikautadze
- (Germany) Louis Lemke
- (Germany) Isaiah Seretis
- (Greece) Theodoros Kalpakis
- (Greece) Alexandros Moysiadis
- (Greece) Iason Nempis
- (Greece) Sarafianos Papasarafianos
- (Greece) Georgios Siozios
- (Greece) Stefanos Tsigkas
- (Hungary) Mihály Dajka
- (Hungary) Martin Juhász
- (Hungary) Barna Somfalvi
- (Hungary) Dénes Szakál
- (Hungary) Andrej Vasiljevic
- (Hungary) Tamás Vincze
- (Iceland) Sigurður Kárason
- (Iceland) Markús Andri Daníelsson Martin
- (Iceland) Alexander Rafn Pálmason
- (Israel) Yarin Abihazira
- (Israel) Noam Goldenberg
- (Israel) Adam Grimberg
- (Israel) Daniel Ben Shushan
- (Israel) Ido Yossef
- (Israel) Ben Zuares
- (Italy) Edoardo Biondini
- (Italy) Giampaolo Bonifazi
- (Italy) Jacopo Del Fabro
- (Italy) Francesco Gasparello
- (Italy) Jacopo Landi
- (Italy) Gianluca Okon
- (Italy) Ludovico Varali
- (Kazakhstan) Rasul Akimov
- (Kazakhstan) Roman Chernomorets
- (Kazakhstan) Daulet Orynbassar
- (Kazakhstan) Abylay Zhilkaidar
- (Kosovo) Endi Krasniqi
- (Latvia) Ralfs Blūms
- (Latvia) Georgijs Bombāns
- (Latvia) Alims Saveļjevs
- (Latvia) Ņikita Solomonovs
- (Liechtenstein) Emanuel Wolf
- (Lithuania) Tomas Jonyla
- (Lithuania) Gvidas Valatkevičius
- (Lithuania) Dominykas Zubavičius
- (Luxembourg) Cristiano Alves Macedo
- (Luxembourg) Tiago Oliveira Martins
- (Luxembourg) Saiyen Moreira
- (Luxembourg) Kilian Elias Nascimento
- (Luxembourg) Jess Gomes Rodrigues
- (Malta) Kaylon Zammit
- (Moldova) Maxim Ciuchin
- (Moldova) Cristian Palancica
- (Moldova) Marius-Nicolae Rosioru
- (Moldova) Toma Turetchi
- (Montenegro) Aleksa Caušević
- (Montenegro) Vesko Čukić
- (Montenegro) Nemanja Kljajević
- (Netherlands) Mika Pieterse
- (Netherlands) Jeshurun Simeon
- (North Macedonia) Filip Cvetkovski
- (North Macedonia) Blendi Ljacka
- (North Macedonia) Erdin Mamuti
- (North Macedonia) Gregorijan Mihajlovski
- (North Macedonia) Jakov Stojkovski
- (Northern Ireland) Shea Mcgarry
- (Northern Ireland) Eamon Tohill
- (Norway) Aleksander Lilletun Elvebu
- (Norway) Emil Hillestad
- (Norway) Andreas Wilhelmsen
- (Poland) Hubert Smyrak
- (Portugal) Nélio Batista
- (Portugal) Simão Constantino
- (Portugal) Duarte Tomás
- (Republic of Ireland) Desmond Armstrong
- (Republic of Ireland) Joe Byrne
- (Republic of Ireland) Josh Harpur
- (Republic of Ireland) Trevor Molloy Murray
- (Republic of Ireland) Joey Wuna
- (Romania) Darius Bota
- (Romania) Edu Corlat
- (Romania) Razvan Marincean
- (Romania) Cosmin Matei
- (Romania) Ioan Precup
- (San Marino) Alessandro Ciacci
- (San Marino) Giacomo Montali
- (San Marino) Edoardo Pala
- (Scotland) Ethan Crombie
- (Scotland) Aaron Thomson
- (Serbia) Luka Andrijašević
- (Serbia) Danilo Fekete
- (Serbia) Nebojša Grujić
- (Serbia) Vojin Marinković
- (Serbia) Aleksa Mitić
- (Serbia) Tadija Samardzic
- (Slovakia) Lukáš Líška
- (Slovakia) Marco Prekop
- (Slovakia) Matúš Tomáško
- (Slovakia) Marko Václavek
- (Slovenia) Maj Balažic
- (Slovenia) Gabriel Bogatinov
- (Slovenia) Tian Nai Koren
- (Slovenia) Tristan Kotar
- (Slovenia) Tai Primc
- (Slovenia) Jaka Robin
- (Spain) Abdou Kemo Badji
- (Spain) Christian Imga
- (Spain) Sergi Mayans
- (Spain) Jordi Pesquer
- (Spain) Mikel Urrestarazu
- (Spain) Michal Zuk
- (Sweden) Leon Westin Bryhn
- (Sweden) Elion Imeri
- (Sweden) Vicente Ponnert Hidalgo
- (Sweden) Oliver Månsson
- (Sweden) Gabriel Duarte Santos
- (Switzerland) Altin Azemi
- (Switzerland) Ivan Izquierdo
- (Switzerland) Bright Boahen Ocran
- (Switzerland) Gentian Ponik
- (Turkey) Eymen Erdogan
- (Turkey) Emin Sayar
- (Turkey) Mustafa Tosun
- (Turkey) Necati Yançel
- (Turkey) Ada Yüzgeç
- (Ukraine) Yaroslav Buravtsov
- (Ukraine) Adam Huram
- (Ukraine) Nicola Cappellato
- (Ukraine) Volodymyr Kvikvinia
- (Ukraine) Daniil Pylypchuk
- (Ukraine) Yevhenii Voloshko
- (Wales) Alex Godfrey
- (Wales) Leo Papirnyk
- (Wales) Shea Pita
- (Wales) Leon Scarlett

1 own goal

- (Gibraltar) Kaion Drakes (against Czech Republic)
- (Gibraltar) Christian Anthony Perera Vinent (against Bosnia and Herzegovina)
- (Liechtenstein) Manoel Honorio (against Wales)
- (Malta) Ryan Debono (against Azerbaijan)
- (Montenegro) Stevan Nedić (against Sweden)
- (Portugal) Tomás Ferreira (against Slovenia)
- (San Marino) Victor Joseph Marius Jourdain (against Georgia)
- (San Marino) Achille Montebelli (against Switzerland)
- (Slovakia) Mark Marian Cingel (against Croatia)
- (Sweden) Vicente Ponnert Hidalgo (against Greece)
- (Switzerland) Noah Kakor (against Bulgaria)
