= Edu Corlat =

Romanian footballer (born 2009)

Personal information
- Full name: Eduardo Valentin Corlat Cucu
- Date of birth: 17 February 2009 (age 17)
- Place of birth: Madrid, Spain
- Position: Defender

Team information
- Current team: Real Madrid

Youth career
- –2018: Moscardó
- 2018–2020: Getafe
- 2020–: Real Madrid

International career^{‡}
Years	Team	Apps	(Gls)
2024–2025	Romania U16	6	(0)
2025–2026	Romania U17	9	(1)
2026–	Romania U18	2	(0)
- ‡ National team caps and goals as of 2 October 2026

Eduardo Valentin Corlat Cucu (born 17 February 2009) is a footballer who plays as a defender for Real Madrid. Born in Spain to Romanian parents, he is a Romania youth international.

== Early life ==
Corlat was born on 17 February 2009 in Madrid, Spain. A native of the city, he obtained Romanian citizenship and Spanish citizenship. Both of his parents are Romanians.

== Club career ==
As a youth player, Corlat joined the youth academy of Spanish side Moscardó. Following his stint there, he joined the youth academy of Getafe in Spain in 2018.

Ahead of the 2020–21 season, he joined the youth academy of Spanish La Liga outfit Real Madrid, where he played alongside Spanish footballer Enzo Alves and was promoted to the club's under-18 team in 2026.

== International career ==
Corlat is a Romania youth international and has represented the country internationally at under-16, under-17 and under-18 levels and is eligible to represent Spain internationally, having been born in the country. Altogether, he made six appearances and scored zero goals while playing for the Romania national under-16 football team and nine appearances and scored one goals while playing for the Romania national under-17 football team and captained the latter.

During the autumn of 2025 and the spring of 2026, he played for the Romania national under-17 football team for 2026 UEFA European Under-17 Championship qualification. On 29 September 2026, he debuted for the Romania national under-18 football team during a 2–0 away friendly win over the Turkey national under-18 football team.

== Style of play ==
Corlat plays as a defender. English newspaper The Guardian wrote in 2026 that "his positioning is excellent and he knows how to pass the ball – and he doesn't hesitate to bring the ball out of defence himself either".
