= Poland national under-19 football team =

National association football team

Poland Under-19
- Nickname(s): Biało-czerwoni (The White and Reds); Białe Orły (The White Eagles)
- Association: Polish Football Association (Polski Związek Piłki Nożnej)
- Head coach: Radosław Sobolewski
- FIFA code: POL
| First colours | Second colours |

UEFA European Under-19 Championship
- Appearances: 3 (first in 2004)
- Best result: Group stage (2004, 2006, 2023)

The Poland national under-19 football team represents the Polish Football Association in international football at this age level.

This team is for Polish players aged 19 or under at the start of a two-year European Under-19 Football Championship campaign.

== Competitive record ==
*Denotes draws include knockout matches decided on penalty kicks.
Gold background colour indicates that the tournament was won.
Silver background colour indicates second-place finish.
Bronze background colour indicates third-place finish.
Red border color indicates tournament was held on home soil.

=== UEFA European U-19 Championship ===
UEFA European Under-19 Championship record
| Year | Round | Pld | W | D * | L | GF | GA |
|---|---|---|---|---|---|---|---|
| (Norway) 2002 | did not qualify | | | | | | |
| (Liechtenstein) 2003 | did not qualify | | | | | | |
| (Switzerland) 2004 | Group stage | 3 | 0 | 0 | 3 | 5 | 11 |
| (Northern Ireland) 2005 | did not qualify | | | | | | |
| (Poland) 2006 | Group stage | 3 | 1 | 0 | 2 | 4 | 4 |
| (Austria) 2007 | did not qualify | | | | | | |
| (Czech Republic) 2008 | did not qualify | | | | | | |
| (Ukraine) 2009 | did not qualify | | | | | | |
| (France) 2010 | did not qualify | | | | | | |
| (Romania) 2011 | did not qualify | | | | | | |
| (Estonia) 2012 | did not qualify | | | | | | |
| (Lithuania) 2013 | did not qualify | | | | | | |
| (Hungary) 2014 | did not qualify | | | | | | |
| (Greece) 2015 | did not qualify | | | | | | |
| (Germany) 2016 | did not qualify | | | | | | |
| (Georgia (country)) 2017 | did not qualify | | | | | | |
| (Finland) 2018 | did not qualify | | | | | | |
| (Armenia) 2019 | did not qualify | | | | | | |
| (Northern Ireland) 2020 | Cancelled | | | | | | |
| (Romania) 2021 | Cancelled | | | | | | |
| (Slovakia) 2022 | did not qualify | | | | | | |
| (Malta) 2023 | Group stage | 3 | 1 | 1 | 1 | 3 | 3 |
| (Northern Ireland) 2024 | did not qualify | | | | | | |
| (Romania) 2025 | did not qualify | | | | | | |
| (Wales) 2026 | did not qualify | | | | | | |
| (Czech Republic) 2027 | To be determined | | | | | | |
| (Bulgaria) 2028 | To be determined | | | | | | |
| (Netherlands) 2029 | To be determined | | | | | | |
| Total | 3/23 | 9 | 2 | 1 | 6 | 12 | 18 |

== Results and fixtures ==
The following is a list of match results from the last 12 months, as well as any future matches that have been scheduled.

Win Draw Loss Fixture

| 25 March 2026 2026 UEFA Euro Under-19 qualifying Elite Round | Poland | 0–1 | Portugal | Braga, Portugal |
| 16:00 CET (UTC+01:00) | | Report | Rodrigues 60' | Stadium: Estádio Amélia Morais; Attendance: 537; Referee: Christian-Petru Ciochircă (Austria) |

| 28 March 2026 2026 UEFA Euro Under-19 qualifying Elite Round | England | 1–0 | Poland | Guimarães, Portugal |
| 12:00 CET (UTC+01:00) | Mheuka 86' | Report | | Stadium: Pista de Atletismo Gémeos Castro; Attendance: 159; Referee: Jacob Karlsen (Denmark) |

| 31 March 2026 2026 UEFA Euro Under-19 qualifying Elite Round | Serbia | 1–0 | Poland | Fafe, Portugal |
| 17:00 CEST (UTC+02:00) | Cvetković 77' | Report | | Stadium: Estádio Municipal de Fafe; Attendance: 51; Referee: Christian-Petru Ciochircă (Austria) |

| 25 September 2026 Friendly | Poland | 0–1 | Switzerland | Dunajská Lužná, Slovakia |
| 11:30 CEST (UTC+02:00) | | Report | Despotovic 79' | Stadium: NTC Dunajská Lužná |

| 28 September 2026 Friendly | Slovakia | 1–2 | Poland | Senec, Slovakia |
| 17:00 CEST (UTC+02:00) | Hofstädter 31' | Report | Szczygieł 77', 90' | Stadium: NTC Senec |

| 1 October 2026 Friendly | Poland | 3–0 | Kazakhstan | Dunajská Lužná, Slovakia |
| 11:30 CEST (UTC+02:00) | Zalewski 22'; Karmelita 50'; Burkiewicz 64' | Report | | Stadium: NTC Dunajská Lužná |

| 11 November 2026 2027 UEFA Euro Under-19 qualifying | Andorra | 0–5 | Poland | Przeworsk, Poland |
| 12:00 CET (UTC+01:00) | | Report | Szymczak 4'; Burkiewicz 29', 44'; Zalewski 50'; Śledziński 87' | Stadium: Przeworsk Municipal Stadium; Attendance: 880; Referee: Miloš Savović (Montenegro) |

| 17 November 2026 2027 UEFA Euro Under-19 qualifying | Poland | 2–1 | Luxembourg | Leżajsk, Poland |
| 12:00 CET (UTC+01:00) | Rostek 61'; Lauryn 83' | Report | Gomes Rodrigues 67' | Stadium: Leżajsk Municipal Stadium, Leżajsk; Attendance: 942; Referee: Dominik Starý (Czech Republic) |

== Players ==
=== Current squad ===
The following players were called up for the 2027 UEFA Euro Under-19 qualifying matches against Andorra and Luxembourg on 11 and 17 November 2026.

Caps and goals updated as of 17 November 2026 after the match against Luxembourg.

| No. | Pos. | Player | Date of birth (age) | Caps | Goals | Club |
|---|---|---|---|---|---|---|
| 1 | GK | Jakub Zieliński | 21 February 2008 (age 18) | 4 | 0 | (German Football Association) VfL Wolfsburg |
| 22 | GK | Jan Bienduga | 10 August 2008 (age 18) | 1 | 0 | (Polish Football Association) Legia Warsaw |
| | GK | Hubert Charuży | 21 February 2008 (age 18) | 1 | 0 | (Portuguese Football Federation) Porto |
| 2 | DF | Wojciech Machura | 3 March 2008 (age 18) | 3 | 0 | (Polish Football Association) Stal Rzeszów |
| 4 | DF | Patryk Mackiewicz | 23 October 2008 (age 18) | 5 | 0 | (Italian Football Federation) Inter Milan |
| 18 | DF | Mateusz Lauryn | 28 March 2008 (age 18) | 5 | 1 | (Polish Football Association) Legia Warsaw II |
| 5 | MF | Mateusz Rosół | 11 June 2008 (age 18) | 5 | 0 | (Polish Football Association) Ruch Chorzów |
| 6 | MF | Filip Przybyłko | 4 August 2008 (age 18) | 5 | 0 | (Polish Football Association) Legia Warsaw |
| 7 | MF | Eryk Śledziński | 24 June 2008 (age 18) | 2 | 1 | (Polish Football Association) Lech Poznań II |
| 8 | MF | Adam Ciućka | 16 January 2008 (age 18) | 5 | 0 | (Polish Football Association) Śląsk Wrocław |
| 9 | MF | Lenard Szczygieł | 24 August 2008 (age 18) | 5 | 2 | (Polish Football Association) ŁKS Łódź |
| 10 | MF | Sammy Dudek | 18 April 2008 (age 18) | 3 | 0 | (Polish Football Association) Unia Skierniewice |
| 11 | MF | Tymoteusz Gmur | 2 January 2008 (age 18) | 5 | 0 | (Polish Football Association) Stal Mielec |
| 13 | MF | Filip Karmelita | 8 December 2008 (age 17) | 4 | 1 | (Polish Football Association) Raków Częstochowa II |
| 15 | MF | Jakub Kucharski | 3 November 2008 (age 18) | 1 | 0 | (Polish Football Association) Jagiellonia Białystok |
| 16 | MF | Pascal Mozie | 6 May 2008 (age 18) | 5 | 0 | (French Football Federation) Annecy |
| 19 | MF | Zachary Zalewski | 3 January 2009 (age 17) | 5 | 2 | (Polish Football Association) Jagiellonia Białystok |
| 20 | MF | Krystian Rostek | 8 March 2008 (age 18) | 5 | 1 | (Polish Football Association) Ruch Chorzów |
| 21 | MF | Antoni Burkiewicz | 21 April 2008 (age 18) | 5 | 3 | (Polish Football Association) Unia Skierniewice |
| 14 | FW | Mikołaj Czerniatowicz | 7 June 2008 (age 18) | 3 | 0 | (Polish Football Association) Widzew Łódź II |
| 17 | FW | Wojciech Szymczak | 5 January 2008 (age 18) | 5 | 1 | (Polish Football Association) Lech Poznań |

=== Recent call-ups ===
The following players (born in 2008 or after) have previously been called up to the Poland under-19 squad in the last 12 months and remain eligible:

| Pos. | Player | Date of birth (age) | Caps | Goals | Club | Latest call-up |
|---|---|---|---|---|---|---|
| DF | Jan Juśkiewicz | 23 May 2008 (age 18) | 3 | 0 | (Poland) Zawisza Bydgoszcz | v. Switzerland, 1 October 2026 |
| DF | Jakub Stasiak | 15 May 2008 (age 18) | 3 | 0 | (Portugal) Sporting | v. Switzerland, 1 October 2026 |
| DF | Nikodem Całko | 10 November 2008 (age 18) | 0 | 0 | (Poland) Raków Częstochowa | v. Switzerland, 25 September 2026 ^{WD} |
| DF | Noé Kemtchoum | 6 April 2009 (age 17) | 0 | 0 | (France) Lens | v. Switzerland, 25 September 2026 ^{INJ} |
| MF | Justin Hoy | 14 July 2008 (age 18) | 3 | 0 | (Germany) Borussia Dortmund | v. Switzerland, 1 October 2026 |
| MF | Karol Delikat | 11 March 2008 (age 18) | 1 | 0 | (Poland) Lech Poznań | v. Switzerland, 1 October 2026 |
| FW | Jakub Ligocki | 26 March 2008 (age 18) | 0 | 0 | (Poland) Zagłębie Lubin | v. Switzerland, 25 September 2026 ^{WD} |
^{WD} Withdrew from the squad.^{INJ} Withdrew from the squad due to an injury.^{U21} Player withdrew from the squad due to a call up to the under-21 team.

== See also ==
- Poland national football team
- Poland Olympic football team
- Poland national under-21 football team
- Poland national under-20 football team
- Poland national under-18 football team
- Poland national under-17 football team
- Poland national under-16 football team
