= Alexander Rafn Pálmason =

Icelandic footballer (born 2004)

Personal information
- Date of birth: 7 April 2010 (age 16)
- Place of birth: Iceland
- Height: 1.87 m (6 ft 2 in)
- Position: Winger

Team information
- Current team: KR
- Number: 14

Youth career
- KR

Senior career*
Years	Team	Apps	(Gls)
2024–	KR	9	(1)

International career^{‡}
2024	Iceland U15	3	(0)
2025–	Iceland U16	3	(0)
2025–	Iceland U17	4	(1)
- * Club domestic league appearances and goals ‡ National team caps and goals as of 27 October 2025

Alexander Rafn Pálmason (born 7 April 2010) is an Icelandic professional footballer who plays as a winger for KR He is one of the youngest players ever to score a hat-trick in a senior team match and the youngest player to play, start and score in the Besta deild karla.

== Early life ==
Alexander was born on 7 April 2010. Born in Iceland, he is the son of Iceland international Pálmi Rafn Pálmason.

== Club career ==
As a youth player, Alexander joined the youth academy of Icelandic side Knattspyrnufélag Reykjavíkur (KR) and was promoted to the club's senior team in 2024. On 1 September 2024, at the age of 14 years and 147 days, he became the youngest player to play in the Besta deild karla. The same year, he trialed for Danish sides Nordsjælland and Copenhagen.

On 10 May 2025, he became both the youngest player to start and the youngest to score in the Besta deild, in a 4–1 win against ÍBV. On 19 April 2025, Pálmason scored a hat-trick as a starter for KR Reykjavíkur in their 11-0 win over fifth-division KÁ Ásvellir in the third round of the Icelandic Cup and he became the second youngest hat-trick scorer in history, at 15 years and 12 days. (Note: There is a doubt whether the fourth goal of the game was scored by Palmasson or it was an own goal as a KÁ Ásvellir defender put the ball in the net.)

On 19 August 2025, it was announced that Alexander would join Danish Superliga club FC Nordsjælland from 1st July 2026.

== International career ==
Alexander is an Iceland youth international. During October 2025, he played for the Iceland national under-17 football team for 2026 UEFA European Under-17 Championship qualification.
