= Abel Cedergren =

Norwegian footballer (born 2009)

Personal information
- Date of birth: 26 June 2009 (age 17)
- Height: 1.87 m (6 ft 2 in)
- Positions: Winger; forward

Team information
- Current team: Slavia Prague B
- Number: 19

Youth career
- –2023: Snarøya

Senior career*
Years	Team	Apps	(Gls)
2024–2025	Stabæk 2	33	(17)
2025	Stabæk	4	(0)
2026–	Slavia Prague B	20	(3)
2026–	→ Slavia Prague C	3	(2)

International career^{‡}
2024	Norway U15	2	(1)
2025	Norway U16	8	(8)
2025–	Norway U17	9	(4)
- * Club domestic league appearances and goals ‡ National team caps and goals as of 6 October 2026

Abel Cedergren (born 26 June 2009) is a Norwegian professional footballer who plays as a winger or forward for Slavia Prague B.

== Early life ==
Cedergren was born on 26 June 2009. Born in Norway, he has a younger sister.

== Club career ==
As a youth player, Cedergren joined the youth academy of Snarøya SK. Following his stint there, he joined the youth academy of Stabæk and was promoted to the club's senior team in 2025, where he made four league appearances and scored zero goals.

Subsequently, he joined the youth academy of Czech side Slavia Prague in 2026 at the age of sixteen. On 28 February 2026, he debuted for the club's reserve team during a 2–2 home draw with Sparta Prague B in the Czech National Football League. On 26 July 2026, he scored his first goal for them during a 2–2 home draw with Příbram in the league.

== International career ==
Cedergren is a Norway youth international and has represented the country internationally at under-15, under-16 and under-17 level. Altogether, he made two appearances and scored one goal while playing for the Norway national under-15 football team and eight appearances and scored eight goals while playing for the Norway national under-16 football team.

During the autumn of 2025 and the spring of 2026, he played for the Norway national under-17 football team for 2026 UEFA European Under-17 Championship qualification.
