= David Gerasimou =

Cypriot footballer (born 2009)

Personal information
- Date of birth: 2 November 2009 (age 16)
- Place of birth: Larnaca, Cyprus
- Position: Winger

Team information
- Current team: AEK
- Number: 37

Youth career
- AEK

Senior career*
Years	Team	Apps	(Gls)
2025–	AEK	1	(0)

International career^{‡}
2025	Cyprus U16	5	(3)
2025–	Cyprus U17	5	(2)
- * Club domestic league appearances and goals as of 14 June 2026 ‡ National team caps and goals as of 3 November 2025

David Gerasimou (Greek: Δαυίδ Γερασίμου; born 2 November 2009) is a Cypriot professional footballer who plays as a winger for AEK.

== Early life ==
Gerasimou was born on 2 November 2009. Born in Larnaca, Cyprus, he is of Lithuanian descent through his mother.

== Club career ==
As a youth player, Gerasimou joined the youth academy of AEK. Ahead of the 2025–26 season, he was promoted to the club's senior team.

== International career ==
Gerasimou is a Cyprus youth international. During October and November 2025, he played for the Cyprus national under-17 football team for 2026 UEFA European Under-17 Championship qualification.
