= Altin Azemi =

Swiss footballer (born 2009)

Personal information
- Date of birth: 29 April 2009 (age 17)
- Place of birth: Switzerland
- Height: 1.78 m (5 ft 10 in)
- Positions: Midfielder; winger; forward

Team information
- Current team: Neuchâtel Xamax
- Number: 35

Youth career
- FC Boudry
- Neuchâtel Xamax

Senior career*
Years	Team	Apps	(Gls)
2025–	Neuchâtel Xamax	34	(2)

International career^{‡}
2024	Switzerland U15	2	(0)
2024–2025	Switzerland U16	14	(3)
2025–2026	Switzerland U17	10	(3)
2026–	Switzerland U18	3	(1)
- * Club domestic league appearances and goals ‡ National team caps and goals as of 3 October 2026

Altin Azemi (born 29 April 2009) is a Swiss professional footballer who plays as a midfielder, winger or forward for Neuchâtel Xamax.

== Early life ==
Azemi was born on 29 April 2009. Born in Switzerland, he is of Kosovan descent through his parents.

== Club career ==
As a youth player, Azemi joined the youth academy of FC Boudry. Following his stint there, he joined the youth academy of Neuchâtel Xamax at the age of thirteen and was promoted to the club's senior team in 2025, where he received interest from English Premier League side Manchester City.

On 31 March 2025, he debuted and scored his first goal for them during a 6–2 home win over FC Schaffhausen in the league. During the 2024–25 season, he made seven league appearances and scored one goal while playing for Xamax.

== International career ==
Azemi is a Switzerland youth international and has represented the country internationally at under-15, under-16, under-17 and under-18 level and is eligible to represent Kosovo internationally through his parents.

Altogether, he made two appearances and scored zero goals while playing for the Switzerland national under-15 football team and thirteen appearances and scored three goals while playing for the Switzerland national under-16 football team.

During the autumn of 2025, he played for the Switzerland national under-17 football team for 2026 UEFA European Under-17 Championship qualification. On 28 September 2026, he debuted for the Switzerland national under-18 football team during a 1–1 away friendly draw with the Denmark national under-18 football team.

== Style of play ==
Azemi plays as a midfielder, winger or forward and is right-footed. English newspaper The Guardian wrote in 2026 that he "is a dead-ball specialist, but that is just one of his qualities. He is a tall and elegant attacking midfielder".
