= Czech Republic national under-17 football team =

Sports team

Czech Republic Under-17
- Association: Fotbalová asociace České republiky (FAČR)
- Head coach: Tomáš Kulvajt
- Most caps: Michal Sadílek (30)
- Top scorer: Václav Kadlec (18)
First colours	Second colours

First international
- Italy 2–0 Czech Republic (Savignone, Italy; 19 January 1994)

Biggest win
- Czech Republic 13–0 Gibraltar (Strumica, North Macedonia; 8 October 2025)

Biggest defeat
- Spain 4–0 Czech Republic (Cádiz, Spain; 27 March 2004) Records are for competitive matches only

FIFA U-17 World Cup
- Appearances: 1 (first in 2011)
- Best result: Group stage (2011)

European Championship
- Appearances: 9 (first in 1995)
- Best result: Runners-up (2000, 2006)

The Czech Republic national under-17 football team is the national under-17 football team of the Czech Republic and is governed by the Football Association of the Czech Republic. The team competes in the UEFA European Under-17 Championship, held every year. As of June 2011, their biggest achievement is second place in the 2000 UEFA European Under-16 Championship and the 2006 UEFA European Under-17 Championship.

== Competitive record ==
=== FIFA U-17 World Cup ===
Edition	Round	MP	W	D*	L	GF	GA
(Ecuador) 1995	did not qualify						
(Egypt) 1997	did not qualify						
(New Zealand) 1999	did not qualify						
(Trinidad and Tobago) 2001	did not qualify						
(Finland) 2003	did not qualify						
(Peru) 2005	did not qualify						
(South Korea) 2007	did not qualify						
(Nigeria) 2009	did not qualify						
(Mexico) 2011	Group stage	3	1	0	2	2	5
(United Arab Emirates) 2013	did not qualify						
(Chile) 2015	did not qualify						
(India) 2017	did not qualify						
(Brazil) 2019	did not qualify						
(Indonesia) 2023	did not qualify						
(Qatar) 2025	Round of 32	4	1	0	3	7	6
(Qatar) 2026	did not qualify						
(Qatar) 2027	To be determined						
(Qatar) 2028	To be determined						
(Qatar) 2029	To be determined						
Total	2/16	7	2	0	5	9	11

*Draws include knockout matches decided by penalty shoot-out.
**Gold background colour indicates that the tournament was won. Red border colour indicates tournament was held on home soil.

=== UEFA European Under-16 and Under-17 Football Championship ===
==== Under-16 era ====
Edition	Round	MP	W	D*	L	GF	GA
(Belgium) 1995	Quarter-final	4	3	0	1	7	4
(Austria) 1996	did not qualify						
(Germany) 1997	did not qualify						
(Scotland) 1998	did not qualify						
(Czech Republic) 1999	Fourth place	6	3	0	3	7	6
(Israel) 2000	Runners-up	6	4	1	1	17	9
(England) 2001	did not qualify						

*Draws include knockout matches decided by penalty shoot-out.
**Gold background colour indicates that the tournament was won. Red border colour indicates tournament was held on home soil.

==== Under-17 era ====
Edition	Round	MP	W	D*	L	GF	GA
(Denmark) 2002	Group stage	3	1	0	2	5	9
(Portugal) 2003	did not qualify						
(France) 2004	did not qualify						
(Italy) 2005	did not qualify						
(Luxembourg) 2006	Runners-up	5	3	2	0	9	4
(Belgium) 2007	did not qualify						
(Turkey) 2008	did not qualify						
(Germany) 2009	did not qualify						
(Liechtenstein) 2010	Group stage	3	0	2	1	2	4
(Serbia) 2011	Group stage	3	0	3	0	2	2
(Slovenia) 2012	did not qualify						
(Slovakia) 2013	did not qualify						
(Malta) 2014	did not qualify						
(Bulgaria) 2015	Group stage	3	1	0	2	1	7
(Azerbaijan) 2016	did not qualify						
(Croatia) 2017	did not qualify						
(England) 2018	did not qualify						
(Republic of Ireland) 2019	Group stage	3	0	3	0	3	3
(Estonia) ~~2020~~	Cancelled due to COVID-19 pandemic						
(Cyprus) ~~2021~~	Cancelled due to COVID-19 pandemic						
(Israel) 2022	did not qualify						
(Hungary) 2023	did not qualify						
(Cyprus) 2024	Quarter-final	4	3	0	1	14	7
(Albania) 2025	Group stage	3	0	0	3	4	9
(Estonia) 2026	Did not qualify						
(Latvia) 2027	To be determined						
(Lithuania) 2028	To be determined						
(Moldova) 2029	To be determined						

*Draws include knockout matches decided by penalty shoot-out.
**Gold background colour indicates that the tournament was won. Red border colour indicates tournament was held on home soil.

== Players ==
=== Current squad ===
The following players were called up for the 2026 UEFA European Under-17 Championship qualification, games against Denmark, Austria, and Kazakhstan on 25, 28, and 31 March 2026.

No.	Pos.	Player	Date of birth (age)	Club
1	GK	Ondřej Suchý	16 March 2009 (age 17)	(Football Association of the Czech Republic) Slavia Prague
16	GK	Jakub Veselý	31 January 2009 (age 17)	(Football Association of the Czech Republic) FK Dukla Prague
15	DF	Sebastian Pech (captain)	5 January 2009 (age 17)	(Football Association of the Czech Republic) Sparta Prague
2	DF	David Barčot	10 April 2009 (age 17)	(Football Association of the Czech Republic) Slavia Prague
3	DF	André Thomas Sivok	30 June 2009 (age 17)	(Football Association of the Czech Republic) Sparta Prague
13	DF	Jakub Kratochvíl	25 January 2009 (age 17)	(Football Association of the Czech Republic) Slavia Prague
20	DF	Mikuláš Lužný	25 May 2009 (age 17)	(Football Association of the Czech Republic) Zbrojovka
8	DF	Eduard Wenke	27 August 2009 (age 17)	(Football Association of the Czech Republic) FC Hradec Králové
19	DF	Aleš Sukdolák	3 March 2009 (age 17)	(Football Association of the Czech Republic) Sparta Prague
5	DF	Jakub Chvílíček	3 April 2009 (age 17)	(Football Association of the Czech Republic) Sigma Olomouc
4	MF	Jan Kuneš	16 April 2009 (age 17)	(Football Association of the Czech Republic) Slavia Prague
17	MF	Jakub Chalík	16 January 2009 (age 17)	(Football Association of the Czech Republic) Baník Ostrava
18	MF	Jiří Pšenica	13 May 2009 (age 17)	(Football Association of the Czech Republic) Sigma Olomouc
10	MF	Matouš Srb	1 September 2009 (age 17)	(Football Association of the Czech Republic) Slavia Prague
21	MF	Chinguun Bolorbold	8 January 2009 (age 17)	(Football Association of the Czech Republic) Sparta Prague
	FW	Adam Leibl	5 July 2009 (age 17)	(Football Association of the Czech Republic) Slavia Prague
14	FW	Jakub Marek	16 January 2009 (age 17)	(Football Association of the Czech Republic) Sigma Olomouc
11	FW	Lewis Azaka	12 February 2009 (age 17)	(Football Association of the Czech Republic) Sparta Prague
7	FW	Nicolas Chumlen	30 March 2009 (age 17)	(Football Association of the Czech Republic) Viktoria Plzeň
9	FW	Filip Zahálka	18 December 2009 (age 16)	(German Football Association) Dynamo Dresden
22	FW	Simon Baroš	10 January 2009 (age 17)	(Football Association of the Czech Republic) Baník Ostrava

=== Leading appearances ===
As of 15 October 2025.

#	Player	Caps
1	Michal Sadílek	30
2	Jáchym Šíp	29
3	Václav Černý	27
4	Václav Kadlec	26
4	Dominik Mašek	26
6	Kryštof Čížek	24
7	Pavel Malchárek	20
7	Jan Polák	20
7	Josef Koželuh	20
7	Lukáš Hroník	20

=== Leading goalscorers ===
As of 15 October 2025.

#	Player	Goals
1	Václav Kadlec	18
2	Tomáš Necid	11
3	Pavel Malchárek	10
3	Jan Blažek	10
3	Lukáš Moudrý	10
6	Jakub Štourač	9
6	Michal Sadílek	9
8	Václav Černý	8
9	Tomáš Jun	7
9	Michal Papadopulos	7
9	Tomáš Pekhart	7
9	Dominik Mašek	7
9	Patrik Schick	7
9	Jiří Klíma	7
9	Petr Potměšil	7
9	Kryštof Čížek	7
9	Matouš Srb	7

== See also ==
- Czech Republic men's national football team
- Czech Republic men's national under-21 football team
- Czech Republic men's national under-19 football team
- Czech Republic men's national under-18 football team
- Czech Republic women's national football team
- Czech Republic women's national under-19 football team
- Czech Republic women's national under-17 football team
