= Ognjen Matanović =

Serbian footballer (born 2010)

Personal information
- Date of birth: 14 January 2010 (age 16)
- Position: Attacking midfielder

Team information
- Current team: Grafičar (on loan from Red Star Belgrade)
- Number: 17

Youth career
- Virtus
- Čukarički
- 2023–: Red Star Belgrade

Senior career*
Years	Team	Apps	(Gls)
2026–	Red Star Belgrade	1	(0)
2026–	→ Grafičar (loan)	9	(2)

International career^{‡}
2025–	Serbia U17	10	(4)
- * Club domestic league appearances and goals as of 17 September 2026 ‡ National team caps and goals as of 5 June 2026

Ognjen Matanović (Serbian Cyrillic: Огњен Матановић; born 14 January 2010) is a Serbian footballer who plays as an attacking midfielder for Serbian First League club Grafičar, on loan from Red Star Belgrade. He has represented Serbia at under-17 level.

== Club career ==
=== Youth career ===
Matanović began playing football at the Virtus football school in Belgrade before joining the youth system of Čukarički. He moved to Red Star Belgrade in 2023.

At Red Star's annual club awards for 2024, he was named the club's best player at pioneer level. During the 2025–26 season, Matanović played for Red Star's cadet side despite being younger than most players in the competition.

=== Red Star Belgrade ===
Matanović was included in Red Star's first-team squad during the closing stages of the 2025–26 season. He made his senior debut on 22 May 2026, appearing as a late substitute in a 2–1 home defeat against OFK Beograd in the Serbian SuperLiga.

=== Loan to Grafičar ===
Ahead of the 2026–27 season, Matanović joined Grafičar on loan from Red Star to play in the Serbian First League.

On 14 August 2026, he scored the only goal in Grafičar's 1–0 away win against Voždovac. He scored in the 48th minute after receiving a long pass from Dragan Anokić.

As of 24 August 2026, Matanović had made five league appearances for Grafičar, scoring one goal and playing 341 minutes.

== International career ==
Matanović has represented Serbia at under-17 level. He was selected for Serbia's squad for the first round of qualification for the 2026 UEFA European Under-17 Championship in November 2025.

On 17 November, he scored Serbia's opening goal in a 3–2 qualifying defeat against Turkey.

In March 2026, he was selected for Serbia's squad for the second qualifying round. In the opening match against Cyprus on 25 March, Matanović entered as a substitute and scored twice late in the match as Serbia won 3–1, before being sent off in stoppage time.

As of 5 June 2026, Matanović had made 10 appearances for Serbia at under-17 level, scoring four goals.
