= Zachary Zalewski =

Polish footballer (born 2009)

Personal information
- Date of birth: 3 January 2009 (age 17)
- Place of birth: Windsor, Ontario, Canada
- Height: 1.70 m (5 ft 7 in)
- Position: Winger

Team information
- Current team: Jagiellonia Białystok
- Number: 80

Youth career
- Vardar SC
- 2024–2025: Columbus Crew Academy

Senior career*
Years	Team	Apps	(Gls)
2025–	Jagiellonia Białystok II	26	(10)
2026–	Jagiellonia Białystok	6	(0)

International career^{‡}
2024–2025	Poland U16	11	(2)
2025–2026	Poland U17	11	(4)
2026–	Poland U19	5	(2)
- * Club domestic league appearances and goals as of 13:50, 10 November 2026 (UTC) ‡ National team caps and goals as of 21:16, 19 November 2026 (UTC)

Zachary Zalewski (born 3 January 2009) is a professional footballer who plays as a winger for Ekstraklasa club Jagiellonia Białystok. Born in Canada, he is a youth international for Poland.

== Club career ==
Zalewski developed through youth football in North America, spending time with Vardar SC and Columbus Crew Academy in the United States before relocating to Poland. He joined Jagiellonia Białystok's youth setup and progressed into the club's reserve side Jagiellonia Białystok II, competing in the III liga. In January 2026, Zalewski began training with Jagiellonia's first team under head coach Adrian Siemieniec. He made his senior professional debut in a match against Piast Gliwice on 16 March 2026. On 17 April 2026, he extended his contract with the club until 2028.

== International career ==
Born in Canada and of Polish descent, Zalewski is eligible to play for Poland, Canada and the United States. He began representing Poland at under-16 level, making his debut on 11 October 2024. He made 11 appearances for the U16 side, scoring two goals and contributing three assists, featuring in friendly tournaments against Germany, Romania, and Ukraine, as well as the Football Federations Cup and UEFA Development Tournament.
