= Maksim Karpovich =

Belarusian footballer

Personal information
- Date of birth: 27 February 1986 (age 40)
- Place of birth: Lida, Belarusian SSR
- Height: 1.78 m (5 ft 10 in)
- Position: Midfielder

Youth career
- 2002–2003: Slavia Mozyr

Senior career*
Years	Team	Apps	(Gls)
2003	Slavia Mozyr	26	(0)
2004–2005	Naftan Novopolotsk	41	(0)
2006	Savit Mogilev	27	(1)
2007–2009	Naftan Novopolotsk	60	(1)
2010	Dnepr Mogilev	28	(2)
2011	Vorskla Poltava	3	(0)
2011	Naftan Novopolotsk	12	(0)
2012	Torpedo-BelAZ Zhodino	15	(0)
2013	Belshina Bobruisk	7	(0)
2013	Granit Mikashevichi	15	(0)
2014–2015	Vitebsk	39	(0)
- * Club domestic league appearances and goals as of 7 December 2015

Maksim Pyatrovich Karpovich (Belarusian: Максім Пятровіч Карповіч; Russian: Максим Карпович; born 27 February 1986) is a retired Belarusian professional footballer. His latest club was Vitebsk.

== Honours ==
Naftan Novopolotsk

- Belarusian Cup winner: 2008–09, 2011–12
