= Romania national under-17 football team =

Romania under-17 football team

Romania U-17
- Nickname: Tricolorii (The Tricolours)
- Association: Federația Română de Fotbal
- Confederation: UEFA (Europe)
- Head coach: Mircea Diaconescu
- Captain: Edu Corlat
- Most caps: Laurențiu Brănescu (12)
- Top scorer: Fabian Himcinschi (9)
- Home stadium: CNAF
- FIFA code: ROU
First colours	Second colours	Third colours

First international
- Romania 0–1 Soviet Union (Bucharest, Romania; 17 October 1981)

Biggest win
- Romania 10–0 Liechtenstein (Cumbernauld, Scotland; 19 March 2025)

Biggest defeat
- Romania 2–8 Germany (Darlington, England; 24 April 2001)

FIFA U-17 World Cup
- Appearances: 1 (first in 2026)

European Championship
- Appearances: 9 (first in 1986)
- Best result: Group phase (9 times)

The Romania national under-17 football team represents Romania in international football at this age level and is controlled by the Federația Română de Fotbal, the governing body for football in Romania.

== Competitive record ==
=== FIFA U-17 World Cup record ===
Year	Round	GP	W	D*	L	GS	GA
(China) 1985	Did not qualify						
(Canada) 1987	Did not qualify						
(Scotland) 1989	Did not qualify						
(Italy) 1991	Did not qualify						
(Japan) 1993	Did not qualify						
(Ecuador) 1995	Did not qualify						
(Egypt) 1997	Did not qualify						
(New Zealand) 1999	Did not qualify						
(Trinidad and Tobago) 2001	Did not qualify						
(Finland) 2003	Did not qualify						
(Peru) 2005	Did not qualify						
(South Korea) 2007	Did not qualify						
(Nigeria) 2009	Did not qualify						
(Mexico) 2011	Did not qualify						
(United Arab Emirates) 2013	Did not qualify						
(Chile) 2015	Did not qualify						
(India) 2017	Did not qualify						
(Brazil) 2019	Did not qualify						
(Indonesia) 2023	Did not qualify						
(Qatar) 2025	Did not qualify						
(Qatar) 2026	In progress	1	0	0	1	0	1
(Qatar) 2027	To be determined						
(Qatar) 2028	To be determined						
(Qatar) 2029	To be determined						
Total:1/21	TBD	1	0	0	1	0	1

=== UEFA European Under-16 and Under-17 Championship ===
==== Under-16 era ====
European Championship record								European Championship Qualification record						
Year	Round	Pld	W	D *	L	GF	GA	Position	Pld	W	D *	L	GF	GA
(Italy) 1982	did not qualify	–	–	–	–	–	–	3	4	0	0	4	2	12
(West Germany) 1984	did not qualify	–	–	–	–	–	–	3	6	2	1	3	5	8
(Hungary) 1985	did not qualify	–	–	–	–	–	–	2	2	1	0	1	2	2
(Greece) 1986	Group phase	3	1	0	2	3	5	2	2	1	0	1	3	2
(France) 1987	did not qualify	–	–	–	–	–	–	2	2	1	0	1	1	3
(Spain) 1988	Group phase	3	0	3	0	3	3	1	2	2	0	0	11	3
(Denmark) 1989	Group phase	3	1	1	1	1	4	1	2	1	0	1	5	2
(East Germany) 1990	did not qualify	–	–	–	–	–	–	2	4	1	2	1	6	5
(Switzerland) 1991	Group phase	3	1	1	1	3	5	1	2	1	0	1	3	2
(Cyprus) 1992	Group phase	3	0	1	2	1	7	1	2	1	0	1	2	2
(Turkey) 1993	did not qualify	–	–	–	–	–	–	2	2	0	0	2	0	3
(Republic of Ireland) 1994	did not qualify	–	–	–	–	–	–	3	4	0	1	3	2	8
(Belgium) 1995	did not qualify	–	–	–	–	–	–	3	2	0	2	2	2	4
(Austria) 1996	Group phase	3	0	0	3	1	6	1	2	2	0	0	4	1
(Germany) 1997	did not qualify	–	–	–	–	–	–	3	3	1	1	1	3	4
(Scotland) 1998	did not qualify	–	–	–	–	–	–	2	4	2	1	1	5	2
(Czech Republic) 1999	did not qualify	–	–	–	–	–	–	3	2	0	1	1	3	5
(Israel) 2000	Group phase	3	0	0	3	0	5	1	2	2	0	0	5	0
(England) 2001	Group phase	3	0	0	3	2	13	1	2	2	0	0	9	0

*Draws also include penalty shootouts, regardless of the outcome.

==== Under-17 era ====
European Championship record								European Championship Qualification record						
Year	Round	Pld	W	D *	L	GF	GA	Position	Pld	W	D *	L	GF	GA
(Denmark) 2002	did not qualify	–	–	–	–	–	–	3	3	1	0	2	3	3
(Portugal) 2003	did not qualify	–	–	–	–	–	–	^{Q1} 2	3	2	0	1	13	2
(Portugal) 2003	did not qualify	–	–	–	–	–	–	^{Q2} 3	3	1	1	1	4	5
(France) 2004	did not qualify	–	–	–	–	–	–	^{Q1} 2	3	2	0	1	6	1
(France) 2004	did not qualify	–	–	–	–	–	–	^{Q2} 4	3	0	1	2	3	6
(Italy) 2005	did not qualify	–	–	–	–	–	–	^{First} 2	3	2	0	1	5	4
(Italy) 2005	did not qualify	–	–	–	–	–	–	^{Elite} 3	3	1	1	1	2	2
(Luxembourg) 2006	did not qualify	–	–	–	–	–	–	^{First} 2	3	1	1	1	4	1
(Luxembourg) 2006	did not qualify	–	–	–	–	–	–	^{Elite} 4	3	1	0	2	3	6
(Belgium) 2007	did not qualify	–	–	–	–	–	–	^{First} 3	3	1	1	1	4	4
(Turkey) 2008	did not qualify	–	–	–	–	–	–	^{First} 2	3	1	2	0	2	1
(Turkey) 2008	did not qualify	–	–	–	–	–	–	^{Elite} 2	3	1	2	0	4	3
(Germany) 2009	did not qualify	–	–	–	–	–	–	^{First} 2	3	2	0	1	7	4
(Germany) 2009	did not qualify	–	–	–	–	–	–	^{Elite} 3	3	1	1	1	2	4
(Liechtenstein) 2010	did not qualify	–	–	–	–	–	–	^{First} 2	3	2	0	1	6	4
(Liechtenstein) 2010	did not qualify	–	–	–	–	–	–	^{Elite} 4	3	0	1	2	4	10
(Serbia) 2011	Group phase	3	0	1	2	1	3	^{First} 1	3	3	0	0	12	0
(Serbia) 2011	Group phase	3	0	1	2	1	3	^{Elite} 1	3	2	1	0	4	2
(Slovenia) 2012	did not qualify	–	–	–	–	–	–	^{First} 3	3	0	1	2	2	4
(Slovakia) 2013	did not qualify	–	–	–	–	–	–	^{First} 3	3	0	1	2	2	5
(Malta) 2014	did not qualify	–	–	–	–	–	–	^{First} 1	3	3	0	0	4	0
(Malta) 2014	did not qualify	–	–	–	–	–	–	^{Elite} 3	3	0	1	2	0	2
(Bulgaria) 2015	did not qualify	–	–	–	–	–	–	^{First} 2	3	2	0	1	8	3
(Bulgaria) 2015	did not qualify	–	–	–	–	–	–	^{Elite} 4	3	0	0	3	1	7
(Azerbaijan) 2016	did not qualify	–	–	–	–	–	–	^{First} 3	3	1	1	1	3	5
(Croatia) 2017	did not qualify	–	–	–	–	–	–	^{First} 4	3	0	0	3	1	6
(England) 2018	did not qualify	–	–	–	–	–	–	^{First} 2	3	1	1	1	2	2
(England) 2018	did not qualify	–	–	–	–	–	–	^{Elite} 4	3	0	0	3	2	9
(Republic of Ireland) 2019	did not qualify	–	–	–	–	–	–	^{First} 2	3	1	2	0	6	2
(Republic of Ireland) 2019	did not qualify	–	–	–	–	–	–	^{Elite} 3	3	1	0	2	4	9
(Estonia) 2020	Cancelled due to COVID-19 pandemic							^{First} 3	3	2	0	1	7	1
(Cyprus) 2021	Cancelled due to COVID-19 pandemic													
(Israel) 2022	did not qualify	–	–	–	–	–	–	^{First} 3	3	1	0	2	5	7
(Hungary) 2023	did not qualify	–	–	–	–	–	–	^{First} 3	3	1	0	2	4	8
(Cyprus) 2024	did not qualify	–	–	–	–	–	–	^{Elite} 3	3	0	2	1	2	3
(Albania) 2025	did not qualify	–	–	–	–	–	–	^{First} 3	3	0	2	1	1	4
(Estonia) 2026	did not qualify	–	–	–	–	–	–	^{Elite} 2	6	3	2	1	14	7

*Draws also include penalty shootouts, regardless of the outcome.

== Results and fixtures ==
The following is a list of match results from the last 12 months, as well as any future matches that have been scheduled.

Win Draw Loss

Fixture

25 March 2026 2026 UEFA European Under-17 Championship qualification - Round 2 Group A2	Iceland	2–5	Romania	Carlo Angelo Luzi, Gualdo Tadino
14:00	Kárason 44'; Martin 69'	Report	Bota 22'; Goncear 30', 34'; Tripon 51'; Precup 57' (pen.)	Referee: Duncan Nicolson (Scotland)

28 March 2026 2026 UEFA European Under-17 Championship qualification - Round 2 Group A2	Portugal	0–1	Romania	Carlo Angelo Luzi, Gualdo Tadino
12:00		Report	Tripon 34'	Referee: Oguzhan Çakir (Turkey)

31 March 2026 2026 UEFA European Under-17 Championship qualification - Round 2 Group A2	Romania	1–2	Italy	Stadio Pietro Barbetti, Gubbio
18:00	Matei 85'	Report	Fugazzola 26'; Perillo 41'	Referee: Oguzhan Çakir (Turkey)

2 July 2026 Friendly	Serbia	1–0	Romania	Serbian FA Sports Center, Stara Pazova
18:00	Tadić 63'	Report

5 July 2026 Friendly	Serbia	2–1	Romania	Serbian FA Sports Center, Stara Pazova
12:00	Zarkovic 43'; Anokic 87'	Report	Chira 57'

22 September 2026 Friendly	Slovenia	2–5	Romania	SRC Slatina, Radenci
16:00	Jevšnik 56'; Ružnić 67'	Report	Loghin 37', 48'; Năstac 69'; Matei 74'; Iovan 90'

24 September 2026 Friendly	Slovenia	0–4	Romania	SRC Slatina, Radenci
11:00		Report	Loghin 4'; Matei 9'; Ilie 43'; Oniga 87'

27 October 2026 2027 UEFA European Under-17 Championship qualification - Round 1 Group 13	Faroe Islands	0–4	Romania	Sotira Municipal Stadium, Sotira
15:00		Report	Oniga 33', 36'; Nastac 63'; Loghin 83'	Referee: Igor Bosca (Moldova)

21 November 2026 2026 FIFA U-17 World Cup Group K	Mexico	v	Romania	Aspire Zone, Al Rayyan

24 November 2026 2026 FIFA U-17 World Cup Group K	Venezuela	v	Romania	Aspire Zone, Al Rayyan

27 November 2026 2026 FIFA U-17 World Cup Group K	Romania	v	Cameroon	Aspire Zone, Al Rayyan

== Players ==
=== Current squad ===
The following players were called up for the most recent 2026 UEFA European Under-17 Championship qualification matches.

No.	Pos.	Player	Date of birth (age)	Club
1	GK	Tudor Coșa	22 March 2009 (age 17)	(Romanian Football Federation) Universitatea Cluj
12	GK	Victor Kroes	29 January 2009 (age 17)	(Royal Spanish Football Federation) Real Betis
23	GK	Rareș Andrei	17 February 2010 (age 16)	(Romanian Football Federation) FCSB
22	DF	Ayan Anghel	14 August 2009 (age 17)	(Romanian Football Federation) CS Dinamo București
4	DF	Andrei Dăncuș	20 January 2009 (age 17)	(Romanian Football Federation) FCSB
5	DF	Edu Corlat (captain)	17 February 2009 (age 17)	(Royal Spanish Football Federation) Real Madrid
6	DF	Daniele Paul	12 June 2009 (age 17)	(Italian Football Federation) Roma
13	DF	Robert Corduneanu	27 February 2009 (age 17)	(Italian Football Federation) Fiorentina
14	DF	Claudiu Stancu	4 November 2009 (age 17)	(Romanian Football Federation) CSM Slatina
3	DF	Lóránd Bencze	4 July 2009 (age 17)	(Romanian Football Federation) Csíkszereda Miercurea Ciuc
8	MF	Ioan Precup	20 January 2009 (age 17)	(Royal Spanish Football Federation) Roda
2	MF	Cosmin Matei	20 May 2009 (age 17)	(Romanian Football Federation) CFR Cluj
17	MF	Darius Bota	17 June 2009 (age 17)	(Romanian Football Federation) Csíkszereda Miercurea Ciuc
10	MF	Alexandru Goncear	7 July 2009 (age 17)	(Romanian Football Federation) Farul Constanța
15	MF	Matei Pădure	11 June 2010 (age 16)	(Romanian Football Federation) FCSB
11	FW	Răzvan Marincean	27 February 2009 (age 17)	(Romanian Football Federation) Farul Constanța
7	FW	Denys Muntean	13 May 2009 (age 17)	(Romanian Football Federation) Universitatea Craiova
16	FW	Erik Mănăilă	13 March 2009 (age 17)	(Romanian Football Federation) Rapid București
20	FW	Darius Tripon	2 October 2009 (age 17)	(Romanian Football Federation) Farul Constanța
9	FW	Eduardo Bodnar	30 September 2009 (age 17)	(Romanian Football Federation) Universitatea Cluj
19	FW	Cosmin Mihai	27 January 2009 (age 17)	(Romanian Football Federation) Farul Constanța

=== Recent call-ups ===
Pos.	Player	Date of birth (age)	Caps	Goals	Club	Latest call-up

== Coaching staff ==
Role	Name
Head coach	(Romania) Mircea Diaconescu
Video Analyst	(Italy) Federico Carboni
Match Analyst	(Romania) Cristian Bădiță

== See also ==
- Romania national football team
- Romania national under-21 football team
- Romania national under-20 football team
- Romania national under-19 football team
- Romania national under-16 football team
- UEFA European Under-17 Championship
