= Matouš Srb =

Czech footballer (born 2009)

Personal information
- Date of birth: 1 September 2009 (age 17)
- Place of birth: Czech Republic
- Positions: Midfielder; winger

Team information
- Current team: Bayern Munich II

Youth career
- –2017: Bohemians Praha 1905
- 2017–2026: Slavia Prague

Senior career*
Years	Team	Apps	(Gls)
2025–2026	Slavia Prague	0	(0)
2026	Slavia Prague B	9	(0)
2026	Slavia Prague C	1	(0)
2026–	Bayern Munich II	10	(0)

International career^{‡}
2023–2024	Czech Republic U15	8	(2)
2024	Czech Republic U16	5	(1)
2025–	Czech Republic U17	16	(7)
2026–	Czech Republic U19	3	(0)
- * Club domestic league appearances and goals as of 31 October 2026 ‡ National team caps and goals as of 3 October 2026

Matouš Srb (born 1 September 2009) is a Czech professional footballer who plays as a midfielder and winger for Regionalliga Bayern club Bayern Munich II.

== Club career ==
=== Slavia Prague ===
As a youth player, Srb joined the youth academy of Bohemians Praha 1905. Following his stint there, he joined the youth academy of Czech giants Slavia Prague in 2017, helping the club's under-15 team win the league title. At the of fifteen, he signed his first professional contract with the club in 2024.

Srb received his first and only call-up with the Slavia Prague's first team on 23 September 2025, during a 2–0 away win Czech Cup against SK Sokol Brozany, as an unused substitute however.

In 2026, he was promoted to their reserve team in the Czech National Football League, after playing in the UEFA Youth League. The same year, he also played for their C team in the third division Bohemian Football League.

=== Bayern Munich ===
On 23 July 2026, he moved to Germany and transferred permanently to Bundesliga giants Bayern Munich ahead of the 2026–27 season, getting immediately assigned to their reserve team which competes in the Regionalliga Bayern.

== International career ==
Srb is a Czech Republic youth international and has represented the country internationally at under-15, under-16 and under-17 levels. On 28 November 2023, he debuted for the Czech Republic national under-15 football team during a 2–0 home friendly win over the Hungary national under-15 football team.

Altogether, he made eight appearances and scored two goals while playing for the Czech Republic national under-15 football team and five appearances and scored one goal while playing for the Czech Republic national under-16 football team. During May 2025, he played for the Czech Republic national under-17 football team at the 2025 UEFA European Under-17 Championship, where he was one of the three youngest players in the competition.

== Style of play ==
Srb plays as a midfielder and winger. German magazine Kicker wrote in 2026 that "the attacking midfielder... can find solutions even against physically stronger opponents... ambidexterity, pace, dribbling skills, agility, and vision as his strengths. The young Czech player can also be deployed centrally as well as on either wing".
