= Alexandru Goncear =

Romanian footballer (born 2009)

Personal information
- Date of birth: 7 July 2009 (age 17)
- Place of birth: Ungheni, Moldova
- Height: 1.75 m (5 ft 9 in)
- Position: Attacking midfielder

Team information
- Current team: Farul Constanța
- Number: 29

Youth career
- 2017–: Gheorghe Hagi Academy

Senior career*
Years	Team	Apps	(Gls)
2025–	Farul Constanța	16	(2)

International career^{‡}
2023	Romania U15	2	(1)
2024	Romania U16	6	(0)
2026–	Romania U17	6	(2)
2026–	Romania U18	2	(0)
- * Club domestic league appearances and goals as of 25 October 2026 ‡ National team caps and goals as of 2 October 2026

Alexandru Goncear (born 7 July 2009) is a professional footballer who plays as an attacking midfielder for Liga I club Farul Constanța. Born in Moldova, he represent Romania at youth international level.

== Career statistics ==
As of match played 25 October 2026

Appearances and goals by club, season and competition
Club	Season	League			Cupa României		Europe		Other		Total	
Club	Season	Division	Apps	Goals	Apps	Goals	Apps	Goals	Apps	Goals	Apps	Goals
Farul Constanța	2025–26	Liga I	9	0	1	0	—		0	0	10	0
Farul Constanța	2026–27	Liga I	7	2	1	0	—		—		8	2
Career total			16	2	2	0	—		0	0	18	2
