= Juraj Frigan =

Croatian footballer (born 2009)

Personal information
- Date of birth: 16 May 2009 (age 17)
- Place of birth: Zagreb, Croatia
- Position: Midfielder

Team information
- Current team: HNK Gorica

Youth career
- –2021: NK Zelina
- 2021–2023: NK Dubrava
- 2023–: HNK Gorica

Senior career*
Years	Team	Apps	(Gls)
2025–	HNK Gorica	8	(0)

International career^{‡}
2025–	Croatia U17	15	(3)
- * Club domestic league appearances and goals ‡ National team caps and goals as of 31 May 2026

Juraj Frigan (born 16 May 2009) is a Croatian professional footballer who plays as a midfielder for HNK Gorica.

== Club career ==
As a youth player, Frigan joined the youth academy of NK Zelina. Following his stint there, he joined the youth academy of NK Dubrava in 2021.

Subsequently, he joined the youth academy of HNK Gorica and was promoted to the club's senior team in 2026. On 18 May 2025, he debuted for them during a 0–4 away loss to NK Slaven Belupo in the league.

== International career ==
Frigan is a Croatia youth international. During May 2026, he played for the Croatia national under-17 football team at the 2025 UEFA European Under-17 Championship.

== Style of play ==
Frigan plays as a midfielder. Croatian news website RVG wrote in 2025 "in scouting reports he is compared to [Croatia internationals] Luka Modrić in terms of his playing style, and some will also mention Marcelo Brozović in such comparisons".
