= NTC Dunajská Lužná =

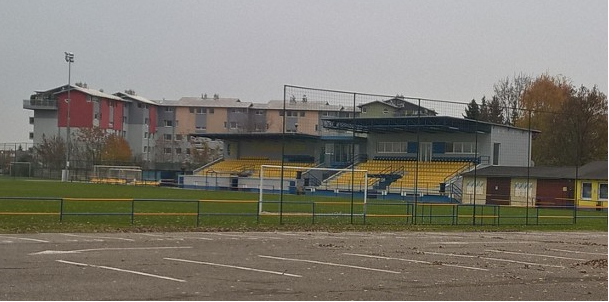
- Interactive map of NTC Dunajská Lužná
- Full name: National Training Centre Dunajská Lužná
- Location: Športová 749/1, Dunajská Lužná, Slovakia
- Coordinates: 48.080890°N 17.263335°E
- Operator: Slovak Football Association
- Capacity: 500
- Surface: Grass
- Field size: 105 x 68 m

Construction
- Renovated: 2014
- Cost: Renovation 520,000 € in 2014

Tenants
- OFK Dunajská Lužná; Slovakia women's national football team

NTC Dunajská Lužná (Národné tréningové centrum Dunajská Lužná) is a football training center of the Slovak Football Association and a multi-use stadium in Dunajská Lužná, Slovakia. It is currently used mostly for football matches and is the home ground of OFK Dunajská Lužná. The stadium holds 500 seating people.
