= Darius Bota =

Romanian footballer (born 2009)

Personal information
- Full name: Darius Cristian Bota
- Date of birth: 17 June 2009 (age 17)
- Place of birth: Satu Mare, Romania
- Height: 1.76 m (5 ft 9 in)
- Position: Attacking midfielder

Team information
- Current team: FK Csíkszereda
- Number: 55

Youth career
- Il Calcio Satu Mare
- –2025: Academia Partium
- 2025–: FK Csíkszereda

Senior career*
Years	Team	Apps	(Gls)
2026–	FK Csíkszereda	20	(0)

International career^{‡}
2025–	Romania U17	11	(2)
2026–	Romania U18	2	(0)
- * Club domestic league appearances and goals as of 11 October 2026 ‡ National team caps and goals as of 2 October 2026

Darius Cristian Bota (born 17 June 2009) is a Romanian professional footballer who plays as an attacking midfielder for Liga I club FK Csíkszereda.
