= Aleksa Mitić =

Serbian association football player

Personal information
- Full name: Aleksa Mitić
- Date of birth: 30 September 2009 (age 17)
- Place of birth: Belgrade, Serbia
- Height: 1.85 m (6 ft 1 in)
- Position: Forward

Team information
- Current team: IMT
- Number: 21

Youth career
- IMT

Senior career*
Years	Team	Apps	(Gls)
2025–	IMT	5	(1)
2025–	→ Ušće Novi Beograd (dual)	7	(1)
- * Club domestic league appearances and goals as of 14 May 2026

Aleksa Mitić (Serbian Cyrillic: Алекса Митић; born 30 September 2009) is a Serbian professional footballer who plays as a forward for IMT.

== Career ==
As a youth player, Mitić joined the academy of IMT and was promoted to the club's senior team in 2025. On 19 October 2025, he debuted and scored his first goal for them during a 1–6 away loss to Crvena zvezda in the league.
