= Michał Żuk =

Polish footballer (born 2009)

Personal information
- Full name: Michał Żuk
- Date of birth: 2 January 2009 (age 17)
- Place of birth: Blanes, Catalonia, Spain
- Position: Midfielder

Team information
- Current team: Barcelona

Youth career
- Aqua Hotel
- 2016–2022: Barcelona
- 2022–2023: Pogoń Szczecin
- 2023–: Barcelona

International career^{‡}
| Years | Team | Apps | (Gls) |
| 2023–2024 | Spain U15 | 9 | (1) |
| 2025 | Spain U16 | 3 | (1) |
| 2025–2026 | Spain U17 | 8 | (1) |
| 2026– | Spain U18 | 3 | (0) |
- ‡ National team caps and goals as of 14:57, 16 October 2026 (UTC)

Michał Żuk (born 2 January 2009) is a Spanish footballer who plays as a midfielder for Barcelona.

== Club career ==
=== Early career ===
Born in Blanes, Catalonia, Spain, to Polish parents from Zamość, Lublin Voivodeship, Żuk grew up in Girona, starting his career with Aqua Hotel, where he scored 27 goals in 16 games as a midfielder. This caught the eye of Spanish giants Barcelona, and he joined the Catalan club's La Masia academy in 2016. Żuk progressed well through Barcelona's youth ranks, racking up over 400 goals by the time he was eleven. He was seen as one of Barcelona's biggest young prospects.

In June 2022, Michał and his brother Miłosz moved to Pogoń Szczecin due to their parents relocating to Poland. However, only a year later, it was reported by Spanish journalist Albert Rogé that Żuk and his brother had returned to Spain, both joining the academy of Barcelona.

== International career ==
Though born in Spain, Żuk is also eligible to represent his parents' native Poland. During a November 2021 visit to the Poland national football team's training, Żuk and his brother, Miłosz, discussed the possibility of representing Poland's youth international teams in the future with president of the Polish FA, Cezary Kulesza.

In September 2023, he received call-ups to both Spanish and Polish under-15 national teams, and chose to represent his country of birth. He made his debut for La Furia Roja's youth system on 2 October against Iceland.

== Style of play ==
Noted for his superior technical ability, especially his ball control and vision, Żuk has been compared to Lionel Messi and Barcelona legend Andrés Iniesta.

== Personal life ==
=== Family ===
Żuk's brother, Miłosz, is also a footballer, who played for FC Barcelona as well. Both of their parents are Polish Citizens who live in Spain.

=== Sponsorship ===
In 2018, Żuk signed a sponsorship deal with German company Adidas. In doing so, he became one of the youngest athletes to have signed a deal with the sporting goods manufacturer.
