= Jeshurun Simeon =

Dutch footballer (born 2009)

Personal information
- Date of birth: 24 December 2009 (age 16)
- Position: Winger

Team information
- Current team: Jong Ajax
- Number: 7

Youth career
- Fortuna Wormerveer
- 2020–2026: Ajax

Senior career*
Years	Team	Apps	(Gls)
2026–	Jong Ajax	9	(0)

International career^{‡}
2024	Netherlands U15	4	(1)
2024–2025	Netherlands U16	5	(5)
2025–	Netherlands U17	7	(5)
- * Club domestic league appearances and goals as of 23 September 2026 ‡ National team caps and goals as of 23 September 2026

Jeshurun Simeon (born 24 December 2009) is a Dutch professional footballer who plays as a forward for Jong Ajax.

== Club career ==
Simeon is a youth product of the Fortuna club from Wormerveer, before joining Ajax in 2020, where he soon as one of the academy most interesting prospects, along the likes of Abdellah Ouazane or Jorthy Mokio.

In April 2026, he signed his first professional contract with Ajax, after a season where he led the under-19 team.

Simeon made his professional debut with Ajax's reserve team in a 2–1 away Eerste Divisie loss to FC Dordrecht on 7 August 2026.

== International career ==
A youth international for Netherlands, Simeon also has Nigerian origins. He played for the Dutch under-15, under-16 and under-17 teams, where he proved to be a prolific goalscorer.

== Style of play ==
Simeon mainly plays as a winger, on the right side of the attack. He is a described as a creative player with good dribbling and scoring abilities.
