= Juuso Mäkeläinen =

Finnish footballer (born 2009)

Personal information
- Date of birth: 27 January 2009 (age 17)
- Place of birth: Kajaani, Finland
- Height: 1.75 m (5 ft 9 in)
- Position: Central midfielder

Team information
- Current team: AC Oulu
- Number: 30

Youth career
- –2023: KajHa
- 2023–2024: OLS

Senior career*
| Years | Team | Apps | (Gls) |
| 2023 | KajHa | 4 | (2) |
| 2025– | AC Oulu | 17 | (1) |
| 2025– | → OLS (loan) | 9 | (0) |
| 2025 | → OsPa (loan) | 5 | (0) |

International career^{‡}
| 2023 | Finland U15 | 6 | (1) |
| 2025 | Finland U16 | 5 | (0) |
| 2025–2026 | Finland U17 | 14 | (3) |
| 2026– | Finland U18 | 3 | (1) |
- * Club domestic league appearances and goals as of 12 November 2026 ‡ National team caps and goals as of 30 August 2026

Juuso Mäkeläinen (born 27 January 2009) is a Finnish professional football midfielder for Veikkausliiga club AC Oulu.

Mäkeläinen made his senior debut in 2023 with Kajaanin Haka in Kolmonen when aged 14.

He scored his first Veikkausliiga goal for AC Oulu on 17 October 2026, the winning goal in a stoppage time against Inter Turku at the Veritas Stadium.

== Honours ==
AC Oulu

- Finnish League Cup runner-up: 2026

Individual

- Football Association of Finland: Boy player of the year 2025
