= Axel Donczew =

Welsh footballer (born 2010)

Personal information
- Date of birth: 6 February 2010 (age 16)
- Place of birth: Wales
- Height: 1.72 m (5 ft 8 in)
- Position: Midfielder

Team information
- Current team: Arsenal
- Number: 80

Youth career
- Cardiff City

Senior career*
| Years | Team | Apps | (Gls) |
| 2025–2026 | Cardiff City | 0 | (0) |
| 2026– | Arsenal | 0 | (0) |

International career^{‡}
| 2024–2025 | Wales U15 | 3 | (1) |
| 2025 | Wales U16 | 2 | (0) |
| 2026– | Wales U17 | 4 | (1) |
| 2026– | Wales U19 | 4 | (0) |
- * Club domestic league appearances and goals as of 17:15, 27 August 2025 (UTC) ‡ National team caps and goals as of 14:43, 29 September 2026 (UTC)

Axel Donczew (born 15 February 2010) is a Welsh professional footballer who plays as a midfielder for Premier League club Arsenal.

== Club career ==
Donczew made his senior and professional debut with Cardiff City as a substitute in a 1–0 EFL Trophy loss to Newport County on 7 October 2025. At 15 years and 234 days old, he is Cardiff City's youngest ever player. On 30 August 2026, Donczew signed for the academy of Premier League club Arsenal as part of club's first-year scholarship intake.

== International career ==
Donczew was born in Wales and is of Polish and Bulgarian descent. In July 2024, he was called up to the Wales U15s for a set of friendlies. In October 2025, he was called up to the Wales U17s for a set of friendlies against the Italy U17s.
