= 2026 UEFA European Under-17 Championship squads =

Football tournament squads

This article describes about the squads for the 2026 UEFA European Under-17 Championship in Estonia. Each national team had to submit a squad of 20 players born on or after 1 January 2009.

All ages are as of 25 May 2025, the day before the start of tournament.

== Group A ==
=== Belgium ===
Head coach: Sven Vermant

| No. | Pos. | Player | Date of birth (age) | Club |
|---|---|---|---|---|
| 1 | GK | Mattis Seghers | 19 January 2009 (aged 17) | (Royal Belgian Football Association) Anderlecht |
| 12 | GK | Lowie Piselé | 17 September 2009 (aged 16) | (Royal Belgian Football Association) Antwerp |
| 2 | DF | Sami El Morabet | 19 May 2009 (aged 17) | (Royal Belgian Football Association) Genk |
| 3 | DF | Elie Mbavu | 20 October 2009 (aged 16) | (Royal Belgian Football Association) Genk |
| 4 | DF | Preben Blondeel | 7 January 2009 (aged 17) | (Royal Belgian Football Association) Gent |
| 5 | DF | Assil Saidi | 10 June 2009 (aged 16) | (Royal Belgian Football Association) Genk |
| 13 | DF | Rayan Garcia Belkacem | 29 September 2009 (aged 16) | (Royal Belgian Football Association) Gent |
| 14 | DF | Léni Strouwen | 24 April 2009 (aged 17) | (Royal Belgian Football Association) Club Brugge |
| 19 | DF | Tinus Moorthamer | 6 October 2009 (aged 16) | (Royal Belgian Football Association) Antwerp |
| 6 | MF | Louie Van Gelder | 30 January 2009 (aged 17) | (Royal Belgian Football Association) Antwerp |
| 8 | MF | Xander Dierckx | 27 February 2009 (aged 17) | (Royal Belgian Football Association) Antwerp |
| 10 | MF | Joshua Nga Kana | 13 June 2009 (aged 16) | (Royal Belgian Football Association) Anderlecht |
| 15 | MF | Noah Kalonji | 22 April 2009 (aged 17) | (Royal Belgian Football Association) Anderlecht |
| 16 | MF | Rune Verstrepen | 20 February 2009 (aged 17) | (Royal Belgian Football Association) Anderlecht |
| 17 | MF | Jelle Driessen | 19 January 2009 (aged 17) | (Royal Belgian Football Association) Genk |
| 7 | FW | Jayden Onia Seke | 8 May 2009 (aged 17) | (Royal Belgian Football Association) Anderlecht |
| 9 | FW | Ilyas Benktib | 23 January 2009 (aged 17) | (Royal Belgian Football Association) Anderlecht |
| 11 | FW | Kiyan Achahbar | 30 June 2009 (aged 16) | (Royal Belgian Football Association) Genk |
| 18 | FW | Noa Ojea | 10 August 2009 (aged 16) | (Royal Belgian Football Association) Anderlecht |
| 20 | FW | Yhanis Onehese | 25 June 2009 (aged 16) | (Royal Belgian Football Association) Standard Liège |

=== Croatia ===
The final squad was announced on 12 May 2026.

Head coach: Marijan Budimir

| No. | Pos. | Player | Date of birth (age) | Club |
|---|---|---|---|---|
| 1 | GK | Lovro Lojen | 27 July 2010 (aged 15) | (Croatian Football Federation) Gorica |
| 12 | GK | Josip Pandurić | 11 March 2009 (aged 17) | (Croatian Football Federation) Hajduk Split |
| 2 | DF | Lovro Trupčević | 23 May 2010 (aged 16) | (Croatian Football Federation) Dinamo Zagreb |
| 3 | DF | Filip Tolić | 23 March 2009 (aged 17) | (German Football Association) Karlsruher SC |
| 4 | DF | Filip Pavić | 19 January 2010 (aged 16) | (German Football Association) Bayern Munich |
| 5 | DF | Karlo Zirdum | 21 January 2009 (aged 17) | (Croatian Football Federation) Dinamo Zagreb |
| 13 | DF | Luka Posavec | 15 April 2009 (aged 17) | (Croatian Football Federation) Osijek |
| 14 | DF | Vito Sablić | 22 May 2010 (aged 16) | (Croatian Football Federation) Lokomotiva Zagreb |
| 15 | DF | Ivan Paunović | 20 July 2009 (aged 16) | (Croatian Football Federation) Dinamo Zagreb |
| 6 | MF | Matej Miličić | 21 September 2009 (aged 16) | (Croatian Football Federation) Dinamo Zagreb |
| 8 | MF | Juraj Frigan | 16 May 2009 (aged 17) | (Croatian Football Federation) Gorica |
| 10 | MF | Jona Benkotić | 20 March 2009 (aged 17) | (Croatian Football Federation) Dinamo Zagreb |
| 16 | MF | Marin Modrić | 5 August 2009 (aged 16) | (Croatian Football Federation) Hajduk Split |
| 18 | MF | Dino Beader Trajanovski | 29 January 2010 (aged 16) | (Croatian Football Federation) Lokomotiva Zagreb |
| 20 | MF | Rio Joka | 10 March 2010 (aged 16) | (Croatian Football Federation) Istra 1961 |
| 7 | FW | Luka Bartolović | 11 January 2010 (aged 16) | (Croatian Football Federation) Cibalia |
| 9 | FW | Toni Ruso | 4 January 2009 (aged 17) | (Croatian Football Federation) Hajduk Split |
| 11 | FW | Nik Žužić Škafar | 3 June 2009 (aged 16) | (Croatian Football Federation) Istra 1961 |
| 17 | FW | Luka Radić | 19 August 2009 (aged 16) | (Croatian Football Federation) Dinamo Zagreb |
| 19 | FW | Jakov Dedić | 27 August 2009 (aged 16) | (Croatian Football Federation) Osijek |

=== Estonia ===
The final squad was announced on 14 May 2026.

Head coach: Marko Pärnpuu

| No. | Pos. | Player | Date of birth (age) | Club |
|---|---|---|---|---|
| 1 | GK | Harly Ollin | 23 August 2009 (aged 16) | (Estonian Football Association) Harju |
| 12 | GK | Sander Karlsson | 10 November 2009 (aged 16) | (Swedish Football Association) Hammarby TFF |
| 2 | DF | Andreas Põder | 26 February 2009 (aged 17) | (Estonian Football Association) Flora |
| 3 | DF | Ronald Sammul | 23 March 2009 (aged 17) | (Estonian Football Association) Flora |
| 4 | DF | Kregor Kalvik | 11 July 2010 (aged 15) | (Estonian Football Association) Flora |
| 5 | DF | Uku Nõmm | 5 June 2009 (aged 16) | (Estonian Football Association) Vaprus |
| 14 | DF | Ron Neltsas | 20 May 2009 (aged 17) | (Estonian Football Association) Elva |
| 19 | DF | Uku Viiroja | 1 July 2009 (aged 16) | (Estonian Football Association) Flora |
| 23 | DF | Samuel Kirsipuu | 10 August 2009 (aged 16) | (Estonian Football Association) Kalev |
| 6 | MF | Jaron Silm | 10 March 2009 (aged 17) | (Estonian Football Association) Flora |
| 7 | MF | Robert Kaasik | 8 January 2009 (aged 17) | (Football Association of Finland) Honka |
| 9 | MF | Karl-Tristan Lorenz | 2 June 2009 (aged 16) | (Estonian Football Association) Flora |
| 10 | MF | Robert Mihhalevski | 10 January 2009 (aged 17) | (Football Association of Finland) HJK |
| 15 | MF | Ricardo Kranberg | 1 January 2010 (aged 16) | (Estonian Football Association) Nõmme United |
| 17 | MF | Karel Isok | 1 June 2009 (aged 16) | (Estonian Football Association) Flora |
| 18 | MF | Robert Lehtmets | 20 October 2009 (aged 16) | (Estonian Football Association) Viimsi |
| 8 | FW | Artjom Timakov | 1 January 2010 (aged 16) | (Estonian Football Association) Levadia |
| 11 | FW | Kert Tomingas | 15 January 2009 (aged 17) | (Estonian Football Association) Nõmme United |
| 13 | FW | Aston Visse | 14 February 2009 (aged 17) | (Estonian Football Association) Kuressaare |
| 21 | FW | Andero Kaares | 29 June 2009 (aged 16) | (Estonian Football Association) Flora |

=== Spain ===
The final squad was announced on 11 May 2026.

Head coach: Sergio García

| No. | Pos. | Player | Date of birth (age) | Club |
|---|---|---|---|---|
| 1 | GK | Guille Ponce | 9 March 2009 (aged 17) | (Royal Spanish Football Federation) Real Madrid |
| 13 | GK | Darlington Osuchukwu | 18 November 2009 (aged 16) | (The Football Association) Manchester United |
| | GK | Diego Piqueras | 3 September 2009 (aged 16) | (Royal Spanish Football Federation) Atlético Madrid |
| 2 | DF | Raúl Expósito | 26 April 2009 (aged 17) | (Royal Spanish Football Federation) Barcelona |
| 3 | DF | Jordi Pesquer | 26 January 2009 (aged 17) | (Royal Spanish Football Federation) Barcelona |
| 4 | DF | Mario Díaz | 17 January 2009 (aged 17) | (Royal Spanish Football Federation) Sevilla |
| 5 | DF | Sergi Mayans | 30 January 2009 (aged 17) | (Royal Spanish Football Federation) Barcelona |
| 12 | DF | Arnau Cases | 17 May 2009 (aged 17) | (Royal Spanish Football Federation) Espanyol |
| 15 | DF | Jorge Domínguez | 21 December 2009 (aged 16) | (Royal Spanish Football Federation) Atlético Madrid |
| 18 | DF | Mikel Urrestarazu | 23 April 2009 (aged 17) | (Royal Spanish Football Federation) Athletic Bilbao |
| 6 | MF | Ian Mencía | 26 March 2009 (aged 17) | (Royal Spanish Football Federation) Atlético Madrid |
| 8 | MF | Mauro Valeiro | 1 September 2009 (aged 16) | (Royal Spanish Football Federation) Deportivo La Coruña |
| 10 | MF | Ebrima Tunkara | 10 March 2010 (aged 16) | (Royal Spanish Football Federation) Barcelona |
| 14 | MF | Holmes Junior | 8 August 2009 (aged 16) | (Royal Spanish Football Federation) Girona |
| 16 | MF | Cherif Fofana | 20 November 2009 (aged 16) | (Royal Spanish Football Federation) Real Madrid |
| 7 | FW | Rubén Gómez | 12 September 2009 (aged 16) | (Royal Spanish Football Federation) Atlético Madrid |
| 9 | FW | Enzo Alves | 16 September 2009 (aged 16) | (Royal Spanish Football Federation) Real Madrid |
| 11 | FW | Abdou Kemo | 5 March 2009 (aged 17) | (Royal Spanish Football Federation) Atlético Madrid |
| 17 | FW | Joaquín Sánchez | 15 January 2010 (aged 16) | (Royal Spanish Football Federation) Espanyol |
| 19 | FW | Roberto Tomás | 20 February 2009 (aged 17) | (Royal Spanish Football Federation) Barcelona |
| 20 | FW | Christian Imga | 17 February 2009 (aged 17) | (Royal Spanish Football Federation) Athletic Bilbao |

== Group B ==
=== Denmark ===
The final squad was announced on 12 May 2026.

Head coach: Morten Corlin

| No. | Pos. | Player | Date of birth (age) | Club |
|---|---|---|---|---|
| 1 | GK | Elias Medina | 14 February 2009 (aged 17) | (Danish Football Association) Brøndby |
| 16 | GK | Villads Bertelsen | 23 May 2009 (aged 17) | (Danish Football Association) AaB |
| | GK | Marinus Bach | 12 July 2009 (aged 16) | (Danish Football Association) AaB |
| 2 | DF | David Stojanovic | 13 August 2009 (aged 16) | (Danish Football Association) Silkeborg |
| 3 | DF | Raphael Canut | 31 March 2009 (aged 17) | (Danish Football Association) Brøndby |
| 4 | DF | Felix Sommer | 25 May 2009 (aged 17) | (Danish Football Association) Randers |
| 5 | DF | Xander Poulsen | 2 June 2009 (aged 16) | (Danish Football Association) Copenhagen |
| 12 | DF | Noah Madsen | 9 February 2009 (aged 17) | (Danish Football Association) Copenhagen |
| 17 | DF | Elias Villumsen | 17 February 2009 (aged 17) | (Danish Football Association) Copenhagen |
| 6 | MF | Marvin Nasnas | 18 December 2009 (aged 16) | (Danish Football Association) Copenhagen |
| 8 | MF | Frederik Vestergaard | 10 May 2009 (aged 17) | (Danish Football Association) Midtjylland |
| 13 | MF | Willads Tuxen | 29 September 2009 (aged 16) | (Danish Football Association) Brøndby |
| 14 | MF | Viktor Bastrup | 28 February 2009 (aged 17) | (Danish Football Association) Midtjylland |
| 18 | MF | Mads Jørgensen | 25 February 2009 (aged 17) | (Danish Football Association) Copenhagen |
| 19 | MF | Noah Manata | 26 February 2009 (aged 17) | (Danish Football Association) Odense |
| 7 | FW | Benjamin Nicolaisen | 29 August 2009 (aged 16) | (Danish Football Association) Vejle |
| 9 | FW | Mikkel Bro Hansen | 25 January 2009 (aged 17) | (Norwegian Football Federation) Bodø/Glimt |
| 10 | FW | Elias Broberg | 4 June 2009 (aged 16) | (Danish Football Association) Brøndby |
| 11 | FW | Omran Khatar | 2 April 2009 (aged 17) | (Danish Football Association) Køge |
| 15 | FW | Kerim Sejdic | 9 March 2009 (aged 17) | (Danish Football Association) Vejle |
| 20 | FW | Tobias Ekstrand | 22 September 2010 (aged 15) | (Danish Football Association) Brøndby |

=== France ===
The final squad was announced on 12 May 2026.

Head coach: José Alcocer

| No. | Pos. | Player | Date of birth (age) | Club |
|---|---|---|---|---|
| 1 | GK | Thâo Mouapa Mwa Meuraillo | 24 September 2009 (aged 16) | (French Football Federation) Rennes |
| 16 | GK | Axel Decrenisse | 25 January 2009 (aged 17) | (French Football Federation) Monaco |
| 2 | DF | Mathis Chambon | 18 January 2009 (aged 17) | (French Football Federation) Montpellier |
| 3 | DF | Nathan Kasia N'Kondo | 5 February 2009 (aged 17) | (French Football Federation) Saint-Étienne |
| 4 | DF | Yoann Becker | 12 January 2009 (aged 17) | (French Football Federation) Strasbourg |
| 5 | DF | Maël Gernigon | 1 October 2009 (aged 16) | (French Football Federation) Angers |
| 12 | DF | Mohamed Diaby | 31 August 2009 (aged 16) | (French Football Federation) Monaco |
| 14 | DF | Mohamed Sylla | 1 February 2009 (aged 17) | (French Football Federation) Paris Saint-Germain |
| 15 | DF | Léo Lemaître | 20 March 2009 (aged 17) | (Royal Spanish Football Federation) Real Madrid |
| 6 | MF | Kénan Doganay | 22 January 2009 (aged 17) | (French Football Federation) Lyon |
| 7 | MF | Joshua Dago | 10 May 2009 (aged 17) | (French Football Federation) Nantes |
| 8 | MF | Believe Munongo | 23 November 2009 (aged 16) | (French Football Federation) Metz |
| 10 | MF | Yanis Addich | 23 February 2009 (aged 17) | (French Football Federation) Strasbourg |
| 17 | MF | Aymen Amaaouch | 30 September 2009 (aged 16) | (French Football Federation) Toulouse |
| 20 | MF | Noah Loufoundou | 13 May 2009 (aged 17) | (French Football Federation) Rennes |
| 9 | FW | Christ Batola | 3 June 2009 (aged 16) | (French Football Federation) Troyes |
| 11 | FW | Arone Gadou | 19 January 2009 (aged 17) | (French Football Federation) Reims |
| 13 | FW | Noha Tiehi | 30 June 2009 (aged 16) | (French Football Federation) Paris Saint-Germain |
| 18 | FW | Mamadou Meïté | 1 July 2009 (aged 16) | (French Football Federation) Paris Saint-Germain |
| 19 | FW | Loan Merrifield | 29 March 2009 (aged 17) | (French Football Federation) Nantes |

=== Italy ===
The final squad was announced on 22 May 2026.

Head coach: Daniele Franceschini

| No. | Pos. | Player | Date of birth (age) | Club |
|---|---|---|---|---|
| 1 | GK | Emanuele Giaretta | 30 April 2009 (aged 17) | (Italian Football Federation) Juventus |
| 12 | GK | Christian Lupo | 29 May 2009 (aged 16) | (Italian Football Federation) Lecce |
| 2 | DF | Giampaolo Bonifazi | 23 February 2009 (aged 17) | (Italian Football Federation) Roma |
| 3 | DF | Matteo Albini | 4 March 2009 (aged 17) | (Italian Football Federation) Como |
| 4 | DF | Djibril Diallo | 9 March 2009 (aged 17) | (Italian Football Federation) Parma |
| 5 | DF | Ludovico Varali | 17 January 2009 (aged 17) | (Italian Football Federation) Parma |
| 6 | DF | Andrea Donato | 14 January 2009 (aged 17) | (Italian Football Federation) Inter Milan |
| 13 | DF | Lorenzo Dattilo | 5 May 2010 (aged 16) | (Italian Football Federation) Roma |
| 14 | DF | Lorenzo Puricelli | 14 March 2009 (aged 17) | (Italian Football Federation) Inter Milan |
| 20 | DF | Edoardo Dario Rocca | 26 October 2009 (aged 16) | (Italian Football Federation) Inter Milan |
| 8 | MF | Edoardo Biondini | 1 January 2009 (aged 17) | (Italian Football Federation) Empoli |
| 15 | MF | Gianluca Okon | 24 January 2009 (aged 17) | (Royal Belgian Football Association) Club Brugge |
| 16 | MF | Francesco Ballarin | 21 July 2009 (aged 16) | (Italian Football Federation) Venezia |
| 17 | MF | Francesco Gasparello | 2 January 2009 (aged 17) | (Italian Football Federation) Atalanta |
| 7 | FW | Jacopo Landi | 26 February 2009 (aged 17) | (Italian Football Federation) Empoli |
| 9 | FW | Diego Perillo | 17 March 2009 (aged 17) | (Italian Football Federation) Empoli |
| 10 | FW | Thomas Corigliano | 10 January 2009 (aged 17) | (Italian Football Federation) Juventus |
| 11 | FW | Marcello Fugazzola | 12 February 2009 (aged 17) | (Italian Football Federation) Atalanta |
| 19 | FW | Tommaso Casagrande | 19 July 2009 (aged 16) | (Italian Football Federation) Hellas Verona |
| 21 | FW | Federico Croci | 1 July 2010 (aged 15) | (Italian Football Federation) Fiorentina |

=== Montenegro ===
The final squad was announced on 15 May 2026.

Head coach: Radovan Kavaja

| No. | Pos. | Player | Date of birth (age) | Club |
|---|---|---|---|---|
| 1 | GK | Danilo Koljčević | 29 January 2010 (aged 16) | (Football Association of Serbia) Grafičar |
| 12 | GK | Simon Sošić | 9 June 2010 (aged 15) | (Football Association of Montenegro) Budućnost |
| 2 | DF | Andrej Krunić | 25 September 2009 (aged 16) | (Football Association of Montenegro) Kom |
| 3 | DF | Luka Marković | 8 January 2009 (aged 17) | (Football Association of Montenegro) Stari Aerodrom |
| 4 | DF | Blagoje Uzunovski | 12 February 2009 (aged 17) | (Football Association of Serbia) IMT |
| 5 | DF | Aleksa Peković | 1 January 2009 (aged 17) | (French Football Federation) Montfermeil |
| 6 | DF | Lazar Popović | 19 March 2009 (aged 17) | (Football Association of Montenegro) Budućnost |
| 15 | DF | Petar Radomirović | 29 September 2009 (aged 16) | (Football Association of Montenegro) Stari Aerodrom |
| 16 | DF | Stefan Nedić | 2 January 2009 (aged 17) | (Football Association of Montenegro) Stari Aerodrom |
| 7 | MF | Nemanja Kljajević | 21 January 2010 (aged 16) | (Football Association of Montenegro) Grbalj |
| 8 | MF | Matija Rakčević | 26 January 2009 (aged 17) | (Football Association of Montenegro) Budućnost |
| 10 | MF | Mark Đokaj | 15 January 2009 (aged 17) | (Football Association of Montenegro) Dečić |
| 11 | MF | Vesko Čukić | 24 April 2009 (aged 17) | (Football Association of Serbia) Red Star Belgrade |
| 13 | MF | Mateja Sekulić | 1 July 2009 (aged 16) | (Football Association of Montenegro) Rudar |
| 14 | MF | Blažo Đukić | 13 April 2009 (aged 17) | (Football Association of Montenegro) Sutjeska |
| 17 | MF | Petar Vujović | 11 August 2009 (aged 16) | (Football Association of Montenegro) Budućnost |
| 19 | MF | Luka Vušurović | 2 January 2010 (aged 16) | (Football Association of Serbia) Red Star Belgrade |
| 9 | FW | Miloš Šekularac | 7 September 2009 (aged 16) | (Football Association of Montenegro) Stari Aerodrom |
| 18 | FW | Aleksa Caušević | 30 August 2010 (aged 15) | (Football Association of Montenegro) Budućnost |
| 20 | FW | Nikola Vukoje | 15 June 2010 (aged 15) | (Football Association of Montenegro) Grbalj |
