= Noah Kalonji =

Belgian footballer (born 2009)

Personal information
- Date of birth: 22 April 2009 (age 17)
- Place of birth: Verviers, Belgium
- Height: 1.85 m (6 ft 1 in)
- Position: Midfielder

Team information
- Current team: Anderlecht
- Number: 68

Youth career
- Standard Liège
- 2019–2025: Anderlecht

Senior career*
Years	Team	Apps	(Gls)
2026–	Anderlecht	2	(0)

International career^{‡}
2026–	Belgium U17	7	(1)
- * Club domestic league appearances and goals as of 19 September 2026 ‡ National team caps and goals as of 29 August 2026

Noah Kalonji (born 22 April 2009) is a Belgian professional footballer who plays as a midfielder for Belgian Pro League club Anderlecht.

== Club career ==
Born in Belgium, to a Rwandan-Congolese father and a Belgian mother, Noah Kalonji grew up near Verviers, in the province of Liège.

He is a youth product of the Standard Liège and Anderlecht academies.

In September 2024, he signed his first professional contract with Anderlecht.

Kalonji made his professional debut with Anderlecht's first team in a 1–1 Europa League qualifier draw to Hammarby IF on 23 July 2026.

== International career ==
Kalonji was selected with the under-17 team to play the European Under-17 Championship in May and June 2026.

Belgium reached the final of the competition after beating Believe Munongo's French team 2–1, a first in the nation's history, after 4 semi-final exits, including twice against France. Belgium finished as runner-ups after eventually losing to Federico Croci and Gianluca Okon's Italy after a penalty shoot-out.

== Career statistics ==
As of match played 19 September 2026

Appearances and goals by club, season and competition
Club	Season	League			Cup		Europe		Other		Total	
Club	Season	Division	Apps	Goals	Apps	Goals	Apps	Goals	Apps	Goals	Apps	Goals
Anderlecht	2026–27	Belgian Pro League	2	0	0	0	2 (Note: Appearances in UEFA Europa League)	0	—		4	0
Career total			2	0	0	0	2	0	0	0	4	0
