= Edoardo Biondini =

Italian footballer (born 2009)

Personal information
- Date of birth: 1 January 2009 (age 17)
- Place of birth: Gualdo Cattaneo, Italy
- Height: 1.83 m (6 ft 0 in)
- Position: Midfielder

Team information
- Current team: Empoli
- Number: 39

Youth career
- Perugia
- 2023–2026: Empoli

Senior career*
Years	Team	Apps	(Gls)
2026–	Empoli	9	(0)

International career^{‡}
2024	Italy U15	2	(0)
2024–2025	Italy U16	18	(0)
2025–2026	Italy U17	17	(2)
2026–	Italy U18	2	(0)
- * Club domestic league appearances and goals as of 7 November 2026 ‡ National team caps and goals as of 29 September 2026

Edoardo Biondini (born 1 January 2009) is an Italian professional footballer who plays as a midfielder for Serie B club Empoli.

== Club career ==
Biondini is from the locality of Grutti in the town of Gualdo Cattaneo, Province of Perugia, and he is a youth product of Vigor Nuova Gualdo in Bastardo, Perugia and Empoli. There, he first impressed with Empoli's under-16, reaching the final of the campionato, where they lost to Juventus.

Biondini started playing with the Primavera team toward the end of the 2025–26 season, while captaining the under-17 to the playoffs, where they won the league after this time defeating Juventus in the final.

On the summer 2026, he started training with Guido Pagliuca's first team.

Biondini made his professional debut with Empoli in a 1–1 Coppa Italia Tuscan derby draw with Pisa on 17 August 2026, starting in the midfield along Gerard Yepes as his team exited the competition on a penalty shootout. He kept his starting jersey for the following Serie B game against Cremonese, like fellow youngster Matteo Egan, Biondini cementing his place in Pagliuca's team, despite being already linked to Serie A team Torino during the last weeks of the transfer window.

== International career ==
Biondini is a youth international for Italy, having played for the under-15, under-16 and under-17.

He was selected as the under-17's captain to play the European Under-17 Championship in May and June 2026.

Italy reached the final of the tournament after defeating Ebrima Tunkara's Spain in a penalty shootout, following a 1–1 draw. They then went on to win the competition after another penalty shootout victory with the same regular time score, against a Belgium team comprising the likes of Xander Dierckx, Elie Mbavu and Jayden Onia Seke.

This Italy under-17 success was also Empoli Youth Sector's, as along Biondini where also Jacopo Landi and Diego Perillo playing a central part in winning both the under-17 Euro and Empoli's national Scudetto.

Biondini was also selected with Italy under-18 in August 2026 to play the Mediterranean Games, but ended up not participating as his club selected him to train with the first team.

== Style of play ==
Biondini mainly plays as a central or defensive midfielder, he's been compared to fellow mediano Italian international Sandro Tonali. He has been described as a team player, leading with example, possessing a good technique, work ethic and vision of the game.

== Honours ==
Empoli FC

- Campionato Nazionale Under-16 runner-up: 2024–25
- Campionato Nazionale Under-17: 2025–26
- Campionato Primavera 2: 2025–26

Italy U17

- UEFA European Under-17 Championship: 2026
