= Ludovico Varali =

Italian footballer (born 2009)

Personal information
- Date of birth: 17 January 2009 (age 17)
- Place of birth: Verona, Italy
- Height: 1.90 m (6 ft 3 in)
- Position: Centre-back

Team information
- Current team: Parma

Youth career
- –2026: Hellas Verona
- 2025–2026: → Parma (loan)
- 2026–: Parma

International career^{‡}
Years	Team	Apps	(Gls)
2025	Italy U16	2	(0)
2025–	Italy U17	18	(1)
2026–	Italy U18	2	(0)
Medal record
Men's football
Representing Italy
UEFA European Under-17 Championship
Winner	2026 Estonia
- ‡ National team caps and goals as of 5 October 2026

Ludovico Varali (born 17 January 2009) is an Italian footballer who plays as a centre-back for Serie A club Parma.

== Club career ==
Born in Verona, Varali is a youth product of Hellas Verona, from which he joined the youth academy of Parma in 2025, for a reported fee of approximately €1 million.

Varali started playing with the Parma Primavera team during the 2025–26 season, becoming a regular with the team that reached the final of the under-20 competition.

== International career ==
Eligible for both Italy and Kenya, Varali is a youth international for Italy, having played for the under-16 and under-17.

He was selected with the under-17 team to play the European Under-17 Championship in May and June 2026.

Italy reached the final of the tournament after defeating Ebrima Tunkara's Spain in a penalty shootout, following a 1–1 draw. They then went on to win the competition after another penalty shootout victory with the same regular time score, against a Belgium team comprising the likes of Xander Dierckx, Elie Mbavu and Jayden Onia Seke.

Varali was one of the players who were called up with the Italy U17s on 11 November 2026, by head coach Daniele Franceschini for the 2026 FIFA U-17 World Cup in Qatar.

== Style of play ==
Described during his youth years as an athletic centre-back, good with his head, his profile was compared to the likes Antonio Rüdiger, while Alessandro Bastoni and William Saliba were his models.

== Honours ==
Italy U17

- UEFA European Under-17 Championship: 2026

Individual

- UEFA European Under-17 Championship Team of the Tournament: 2026
