= Noa Ojea =

Belgian footballer (born 2009)

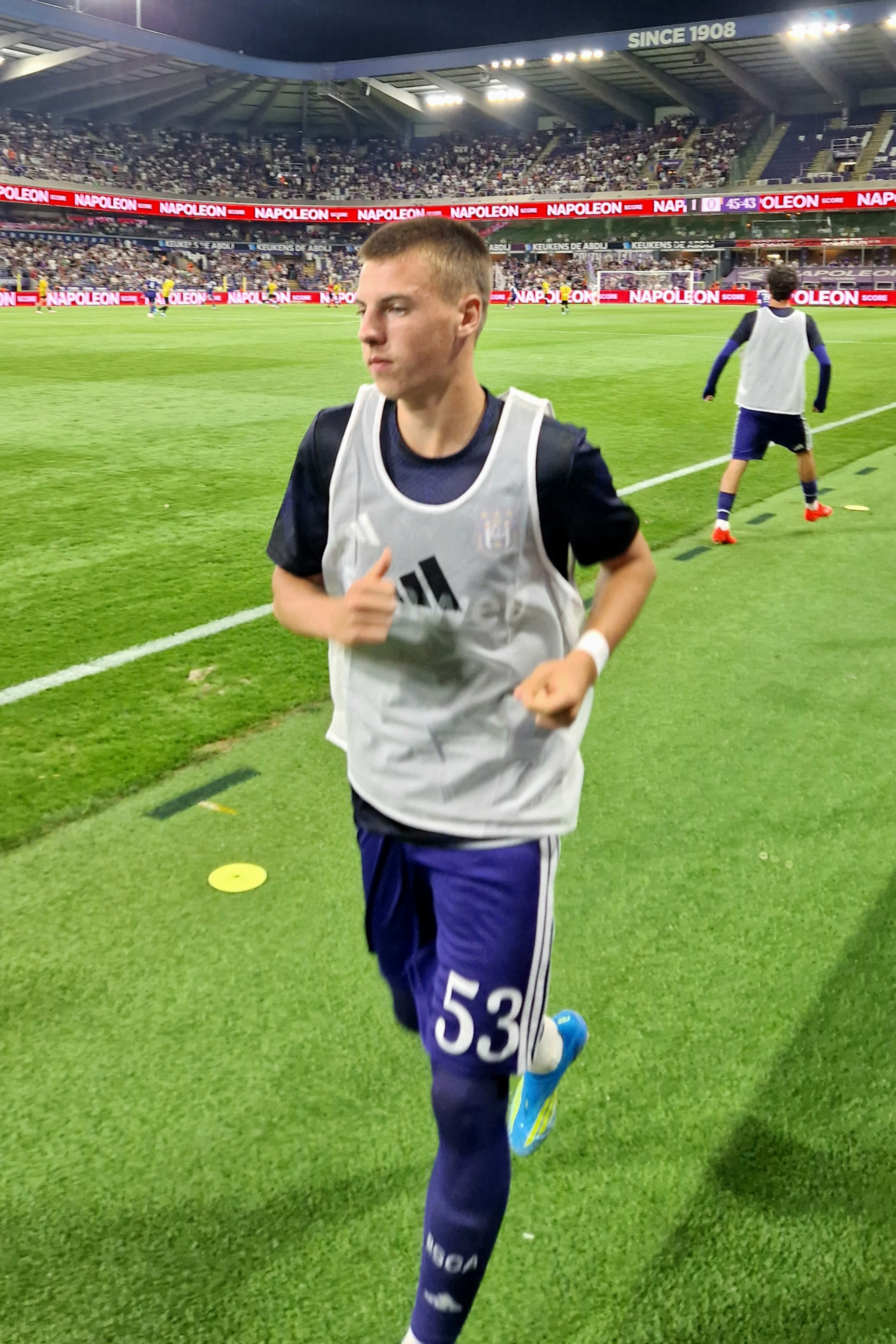
- Ojea with Anderlecht in 2026

Personal information
- Full name: Noa Thomas Ojea Cobiella
- Date of birth: 10 August 2009 (age 17)
- Place of birth: Liège, Belgium
- Position: Forward

Team information
- Current team: Anderlecht
- Number: 53

Youth career
- Standard Liège
- 2023–2025: Anderlecht

Senior career*
Years	Team	Apps	(Gls)
2025–2026	RSCA Futures	2	(0)
2026–	Anderlecht	4	(0)

International career^{‡}
2025	Belgium U15	2	(0)
2025	Belgium U17	4	(1)
- * Club domestic league appearances and goals as of 19 September 2026 ‡ National team caps and goals as of 29 August 2026

Noa Ojea (born 10 August 2009) is a Belgian professional footballer who plays as a forward for Belgian Pro League club Anderlecht.

== Club career ==
Born in Liège, Ojea is a youth product of Wanze-Bas-Oha, Standard Liège and Anderlecht.

In September 2024, he signed his first professional contract with Anderlecht.

Ojea made his professional debut with the reserve team in a 2–1 away Challenger Pro League Brussels derby loss to RWDM on 11 April 2026.

On 8 August 2026, Ojea extended his contract with Anderlech, and made his official first-team debut the following day under Vítor Bruno's management: on the Pro League's opening, he replaced Marco Kana on the 89th minute, as his team defeated La Louvière 2-1 in the Constant Vanden Stock Stadium.

That same month, Ojea also impressed in the Europa League qualifiers, as they beat Kazakh champions FC Kairat who played the previous Champions league, to qualify for the Europa's league phase.

== International career ==
Born in Belgium, Ojea also has Spanish origins. He is a youth international for Belgium, having played for the under-16 and under-17.

He was selected with the under-17 team to play the European Under-17 Championship in May and June 2026.

Belgium reached the final of the competition after beating Believe Munongo's French team 2–1, a first in the nation's history, after 4 semi-final exits, including twice against France. Belgium finished as runner-ups after eventually losing to Federico Croci and Gianluca Okon's Italy: despite Ojea coming off the bench and opening the score, the game finished 1–1 with a penalty shoot-out where Italian goalkeeper Christian Lupo emerged victorious.

== Career statistics ==
As of match played 19 September 2026

Appearances and goals by club, season and competition
Club	Season	League			National cup		Europe		Other		Total	
Club	Season	Division	Apps	Goals	Apps	Goals	Apps	Goals	Apps	Goals	Apps	Goals
RSCA Futures	2024–25	Challenger Pro League	2	0	—		—		—		2	0
Anderlecht	2026–27	Belgian Pro League	4	0	0	0	1 (Note: Appearance in UEFA Europa League)	0	—		5	0
Career total			6	0	0	0	1	0	0	0	7	0
