= Thomas Corigliano =

Italian footballer (born 2009)

Personal information
- Date of birth: 20 January 2009 (age 17)
- Place of birth: Bra, Italy
- Position: Attacking midfielder

Team information
- Current team: Juventus U20
- Number: 10

Youth career
- Cheraschese 1904
- 2016–: Juventus

International career^{‡}
Years	Team	Apps	(Gls)
2023–2024	Italy U15	4	(1)
2024–2025	Italy U16	14	(4)
2025–	Italy U17	18	(4)
2026–	Italy U18	7	(0)
Medal record
Men's football
Representing Italy
UEFA European Under-17 Championship
Winner	2026 Estonia
- ‡ National team caps and goals as of 29 September 2026

Thomas Corigliano (born 20 January 2009) is an Italian footballer who plays as an attacking midfielder for the under-20 (Campionato Primavera 1) team of Serie A club Juventus.

== Club career ==
Born in Bra, Corigliano first played with Cheraschese 1904, a club from Cherasco, before joining the youth academy of Juventus as a 7 years old.

During the 2024–25 season, he started playing with Juventus's under-17, while he was one of the main protagonists of the under-16 side that won the national championship, scoring a direct free kick in the final against Empoli.

In July 2025, he signed his first professional contract with Juventus.

Corigliano started playing with the Primavera team during the 2025–26 season, among the likes of Destiny Elimoghale, whilst being a standout with the under-17, with 12 goals and 16 assists in only 20 games.

== International career ==
Corigliano is a youth international for Italy, having played for the under-15, under-16 and under-17.

He was selected with the under-17 team to play the European Under-17 Championship in May and June 2026.

Italy reached the final of the tournament after defeating Ebrima Tunkara's Spain in a penalty shootout, where Corigliano converted the first penalty, following a 1–1 draw. They then went on to win the competition after another penalty shootout victory with the same regular time score, against a Belgium team comprising the likes of Xander Dierckx, Elie Mbavu and Jayden Onia Seke. Corigliano was among the most salient offensive talents of the Italian team throughout the Euro.

He was one of the players who were called up with the Italy U17s on 11 November 2026, by head coach Daniele Franceschini for the 2026 FIFA U-17 World Cup in Qatar.

== Style of play ==
A left-footed attacking midfielder described as a creative and gifted player that likes to attack spaces and eliminate opponents in 1v1 trough dribbling or passing, his profile drew comparison to Juventus players Kenan Yıldız.

He was also compared to former Italy under-17 standouts Mattia Liberali and Samuele Inácio.

== Honours ==
Italy U17

- UEFA European Under-17 Championship: 2026
