= Federico Croci =

Italian footballer (born 2010)

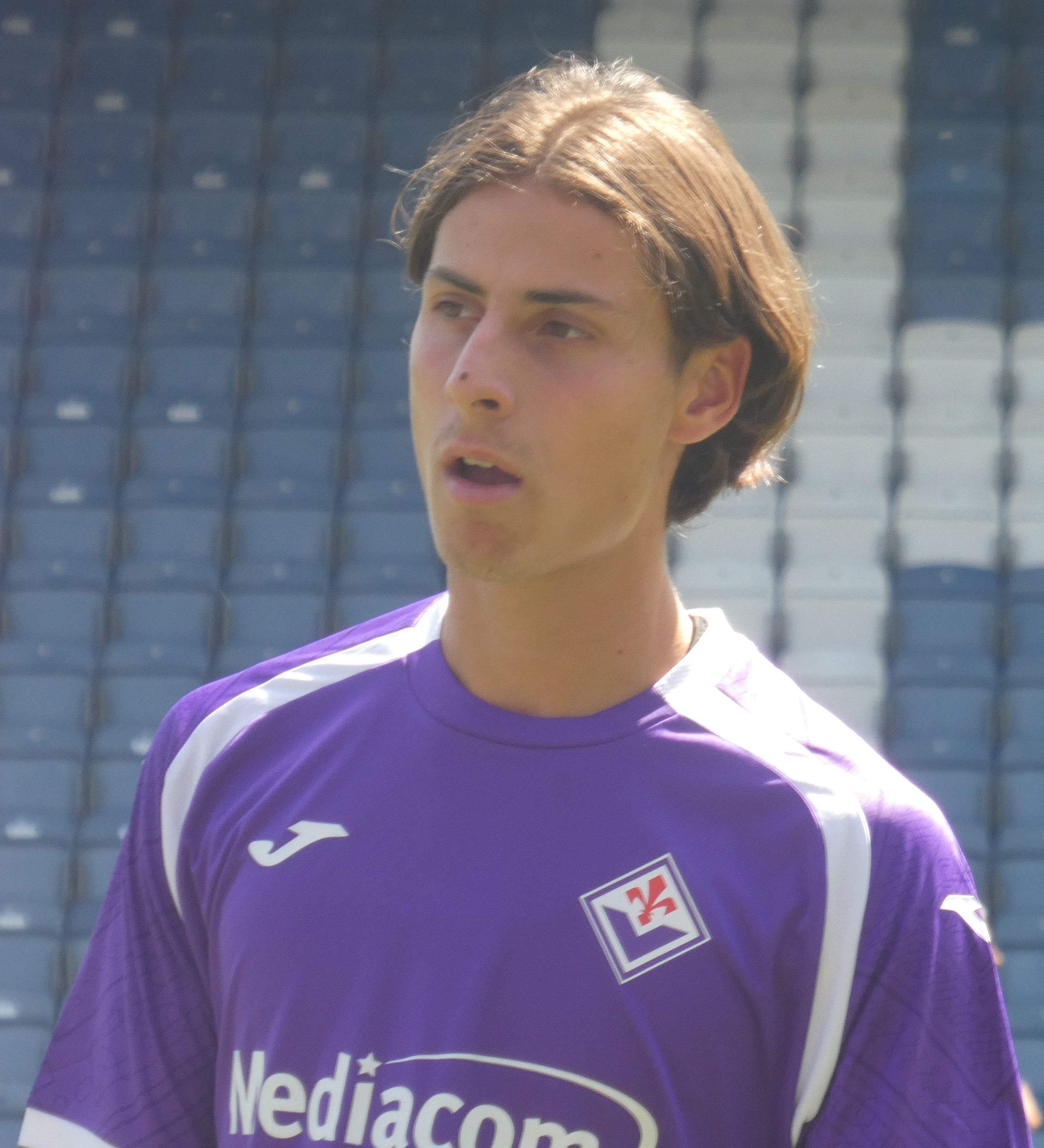
- Croci warming up for Fiorentina in 2026

Personal information
- Date of birth: 1 July 2010 (age 16)
- Place of birth: Bibbiena, Italy
- Positions: Forward; attacking midfielder; winger

Team information
- Current team: Fiorentina
- Number: 70

Youth career
- Montevarchi
- 2022–: Fiorentina

Senior career*
Years	Team	Apps	(Gls)
2026–	Fiorentina	0	(0)

International career^{‡}
2024–2025	Italy U15	13	(9)
2025–2025	Italy U16	9	(5)
2025–	Italy U17	7	(3)
2026–	Italy U18	3	(0)
Medal record
Men's football
Representing Italy
UEFA European Under-17 Championship
Winner	2026 Estonia
- * Club domestic league appearances and goals as of 14 June 2026 ‡ National team caps and goals as of 2 October 2026

Federico Croci (born 1 July 2010) is an Italian professional footballer who plays as a forward, attacking midfielder and winger for Serie A club Fiorentina.

== Club career ==
Born in Bibbiena, Croci is a youth product of Subbiano, Montevarchi and Fiorentina.

In Florence, he was a standout with the under-15, proving to be prolific in front of the goal with the team that reached the final of the Campionato Nazionale Under-15.

He started playing with the Primavera team during the 2025–26 season.

== International career ==
Croci is a youth international for Italy, having played for the under-15, under-16 and under-17.

He was selected with the under-17 team to play the European Under-17 Championship in May and June 2026.

Italy reached the final of the tournament after defeating Ebrima Tunkara's Spain in a penalty shootout, following a 1–1 draw. They then went on to win the competition after another penalty shootout victory with the same regular time score, against a Belgium team comprising the likes of Xander Dierckx, Elie Mbavu and Jayden Onia Seke.

Croci was one of the players who were called up with the Italy U17s on 11 November 2026, by head coach Daniele Franceschini for the 2026 FIFA U-17 World Cup in Qatar.

== Career statistics ==
As of match played 24 August 2026

Appearances and goals by club, season and competition
Club	Season	League			Cup		Europe		Other		Total	
Club	Season	Division	Apps	Goals	Apps	Goals	Apps	Goals	Apps	Goals	Apps	Goals
Fiorentina	2026–27	Serie A	0	0	1	0	—		—		1	0
Career total			0	0	1	0	0	0	0	0	1	0

== Honours ==
Italy U17

- UEFA European Under-17 Championship: 2026
