= Sami El Morabet =

Belgian footballer (born 2009)

Personal information
- Date of birth: 19 May 2009 (age 17)
- Place of birth: Belgium
- Position: Defender

Team information
- Current team: Jong Genk
- Number: 54

Youth career
- KRC Genk

Senior career*
Years	Team	Apps	(Gls)
2026–	Jong Genk	1	(0)

International career^{‡}
2024	Belgium U15	2	(0)
2024	Morocco U16		
2024–2025	Belgium U16	3	(0)
2025–2026	Belgium U17	12	(0)
2026–	Belgium U18	2	(0)
Medal record
Men's football
Representing Belgium
UEFA European Under-17 Championship
Runner-up	2026 Estonia
- * Club domestic league appearances and goals as of 7 October 2026 ‡ National team caps and goals as of 7 October 2026

Sami El Morabet (born 19 May 2009) is a Belgian professional footballer who plays as a defender for Jong Genk.

== Club career ==
A native of Alken, El Morabet is a product of the KRC Genk youth system. He signed his first contract, a three-year deal, in June 2024. El Morabet helped KRC Genk win the U18 Elite league title in 2025–26 after losing just one match all season.

El Morabet was promoted to Genk's reserve side, Jong Genk, ahead of the 2026–27 Challenger Pro League season. He was a starter in their first pre-season friendly, a 7–0 win over Kabouters Opglabbeek on 11 July 2026. El Morabet started again four days later in another pre-season win over RWDM Brussels.

== International career ==
El Morabet was born in Belgium and has Moroccan roots, thus making him eligible to represent Belgium and Morocco at the international level. By 2026, he had been approached "multiple times" by the Royal Moroccan Football Federation to commit to Morocco. El Morabet has represented his birth country of Belgium at the under-15, under-16, and under-17 levels. He also earned a call-up to the Morocco under-16s in 2024.

El Morabet was first called up to the Belgium U17s by manager Sven Vermant in October 2025 for European Under-17 Championship qualification. He was then selected to play the European Under-17 Championship, held in Estonia in May and June 2026. El Morabet started in Belgium's 2–1 semi-final win over France, securing their place in the final of the competition for the first time in the nation's history. The win also avenged their semi-final loss to France the previous year. Belgium finished as runner-ups after losing in the final to Italy via penalty shoot-out. According to RTBF, El Morabet "stole the show" throughout the competition, starting in all five matches. He was subsequently named to the Team of the Tournament.

== Player profile ==
El Morabet is considered a versatile defender who has been employed both as a left-back and a right-back. His under-18 coach at Genk, Eric Reenaers, said he epitomized the "modern full-back".

In 2025, El Morabet was described as an "offensively minded and technically skilled right-back who can cover the entire flank".

== Honours ==
Belgium U17

- UEFA European Under-17 Championship runner-up: 2026

KRC Genk

- U18 Elite champion: 2025–26

Individual

- UEFA European Under-17 Championship Team of the Tournament: 2026
