= Rayan Garcia Belkacem =

Belgian footballer (born 2009)

Personal information
- Full name: Rayan Garcia Belkacem Lachat
- Date of birth: 29 September 2009 (age 17)
- Place of birth: Brussels, Belgium
- Height: 1.85 m (6 ft 1 in)
- Position: Left-back

Team information
- Current team: Jong Genk
- Number: 85

Youth career
- 2024–2026: Genk

Senior career*
Years	Team	Apps	(Gls)
2026–	Jong Genk	1	(0)

International career^{‡}
2026	Belgium U17	6	(0)
2026–	Belgium U18	2	(0)
Medal record
Men's football
Representing Belgium
UEFA European Under-17 Championship
Runner-up	2026 Estonia
- * Club domestic league appearances and goals as of 4 June 2026 ‡ National team caps and goals as of 8 June 2026

Rayan Garcia Belkacem Lachat (born 29 September 2009) is a Belgian professional footballer who plays as a left-back for Jong Genk and the Belgium national under-18 football team.

== Club career ==
Garcia Belkacem made his professional debut with the Genk reserve team in a 2–0 Challenger Pro League loss to Sporting Lokeren on 24 October 2026.

== International career ==
Born in Belgium, Garcia Belkacem is of Algerian and Spanish descent. Garcia Belkacem was part of the Belgium under-17 team that reached the final of the European Under-17 Championship in June 2026.

== Honours ==
Belgium U17

- UEFA European Under-17 Championship runner-up: 2026
