= Zion Pullan =

Spanish footballer (born 2011)

Personal information
- Full name: Zion Orobosa Pullan
- Date of birth: 7 February 2011 (age 15)
- Place of birth: Tudela, Spain
- Height: 1.78 m (5 ft 10 in)
- Positions: Winger; forward

Team information
- Current team: Celtic

Youth career
- Celtic

International career
Years	Team	Apps	(Gls)
2025–2026	Scotland U15	3	(1)
2026–	Spain U15		

Zion Orobosa Pullan (born 7 February 2011) is a professional footballer who plays as a winger or forward for Celtic. Born in Spain, he has represented Scotland and Spain internationally at youth level.

== Early life ==
Pullan was born on 7 February 2011. Born in Tudela, Spain, he is of Nigerian descent through his parents.

== Club career ==
As a youth player, Pullan joined the youth academy of Scottish side Celtic.

== International career ==
Pullan is a Scotland and Spain youth international. On 26 November 2025, he debuted for the Scotland national under-15 football team during a 1–3 away friendly loss to the Hungary national under-15 football team.

== Style of play ==
Pullan plays as a winger or forward. Spanish news website Migrantes del Balón wrote in 2026 that "[he is known for] his explosiveness in one-on-one situations, his ability to attack space, and his goalscoring prowess".
