= 1992 UEFA European Under-16 Championship squads =

Those marked in bold have later been capped at full International level.

== Group A ==
=== Denmark ===
Head coach:

=== Finland ===
Head coach:

=== Italy ===
Head coach:

=== Yugoslavia ===
Head coach:

== Group B ==
=== Netherlands ===
Head coach:

=== Republic of Ireland ===
Head coach:

=== Romania ===
Head coach: Marcel Pigulea

No.	Pos.	Player	Date of birth (age)	Club
1	GK	Petru Țurcaș	16 May 1976 (aged 15)	Politehnica Timișoara
2	DF	Cosmin Contra	15 December 1975 (aged 16)	Politehnica Timișoara
3	DF	Gheorghe Bujor (C)	14 September 1975 (aged 16)	Universitatea Craiova
4	DF	Adrian Gongolea	20 August 1975 (aged 16)	Bihor Oradea
5	DF	Lucian Bica	11 October 1975 (aged 16)	Tractorul Brașov
6	DF	George Movilă	4 October 1975 (aged 16)	Oțelul Galați
7	FW	Laurențiu Lică	28 October1975 (aged 16)	Dinamo București
8	FW	Cristian Ciocoiu	23 Noiembrie 1975 (aged 16)	FC Bacău
9	FW	Mugur Bolohan	28 May 1976 (aged 15)	Suceava
10	MF	Dragoș Tănase	Aged 16	Petrolul Ploiești
11	FW	Laurențiu Roșu	26 October 1975 (aged 16)	Politehnica Iași
12	GK	Silviu Dumitrache	Aged 16	Bucuresti
13	DF	Anton Negrea	Aged 16	Universitatea Craiova
14	MF	Horea Codorean	14 September 1975 (aged 16)	Steaua București
15	MF	Mircea Curuia	7 February 1976 (aged 16)	Sportul Studențesc București
16	MF	Edmond Trifu	10 November 1975 (aged 16)	Șoimii Sibiu

=== Spain ===
Head coach:Juan Santisteban

No.	Pos.	Player	Date of birth (age)	Club
	GK	Javier López Vallejo	25 September 1975 (aged 16)	(Royal Spanish Football Federation) CA Osasuna B
	GK	Manu	6 January 1977 (aged 15)	(Royal Spanish Football Federation) FC Barcelona
	DF	Luis Carlos Cuartero	17 August 1975 (aged 16)	(Royal Spanish Football Federation) Real Zaragoza
	DF	Quique Campos	5 September 1975 (aged 16)	(Royal Spanish Football Federation) Celta Vigo
	DF	Luis González Jiménez		(Royal Spanish Football Federation) Athletic Bilbao
	DF	José Merinero Pachón		(Royal Spanish Football Federation) Real Madrid
	MF	**Iván de la Peña**	6 May 1976 (aged 16)	(Royal Spanish Football Federation) FC Barcelona
	MF	José Félix Guerrero	23 August 1975 (aged 16)	(Royal Spanish Football Federation) Athletic Bilbao
	MF	Íñigo	18 August 1975 (aged 16)	(Royal Spanish Football Federation) Real Zaragoza
	MF	Bruno	16 September 1975 (aged 16)	(Royal Spanish Football Federation) Sporting Gijon
	MF	Daniel Amieva	24 March 1976 (aged 16)	(Royal Spanish Football Federation) Real Oviedo
	MF	Fernando Morán	24 April 1976 (aged 16)	(Royal Spanish Football Federation) Real Madrid
	MF	Álvaro Benito	10 December 1976 (aged 15)	(Royal Spanish Football Federation) Real Madrid
	FW	Loren	26 October 1975 (aged 16)	(Royal Spanish Football Federation) RCD Mallorca
	FW	Iván Pérez	29 January 1976 (aged 16)	(Royal Spanish Football Federation) Real Madrid
	FW	Álvaro Pérez	13 October 1975 (aged 16)	(Royal Spanish Football Federation) Athletic Bilbao

== Group C ==
=== Cyprus ===
Head coach:

=== Germany ===
Head coach:

No.	Pos.	Player	Date of birth (age)	Caps	Goals	Club
	GK	Markus Krause	23 October 1975 (aged 16)	0	0	(German Football Association) Bayer 05 Uerdingen
	GK	Conny Wieland	8 October 1975 (aged 16)	5	0	(German Football Association) BSV Stahl Brandenburg
	DF	Martin Dawitschek	12 August 1975 (aged 16)	1	0	(German Football Association) Bayer 04 Leverkusen
	DF	Marcel Fensch	23 May 1976 (aged 15)	5	0	(German Football Association) FC Berlin
	DF	Sebastian Hahn	18 December 1975 (aged 16)	5	0	(German Football Association) Bayer 05 Uerdingen
	DF	Daniel Wennmann	22 October 1975 (aged 16)	2	0	(German Football Association) FC Schalke 04
	DF	Mariio Wildmann	17 November 1975 (aged 16)	4	0	(German Football Association) SC Freiburg
	MF	Michael Bochtler	15 October 1975 (aged 16)	5	0	(German Football Association) SSV Ulm 1846
	MF	Carsten Hinz	7 August 1975 (aged 16)	4	1	(German Football Association) Borussia Dortmund
	MF	Lutz Lehmann	3 January 1976 (aged 16)	5	0	(German Football Association) Hamburger SV
	MF	Robert Rakowski	3 August 1975 (aged 16)	5	1	(German Football Association) Bayer 05 Uerdingen
	MF	Lars Ricken	10 July 1976 (aged 15)	5	1	(German Football Association) Borussia Dortmund
	MF	Markus Wedau	31 December 1975 (aged 16)	3	0	(German Football Association) Bayer 05 Uerdingen
	FW	Til Bettenstedt	20 January 1976 (aged 16)	5	3	(German Football Association) VfL Marburg
	FW	Matthias Gehring	6 August 1975 (aged 16)	3	0	(German Football Association) SV Bühlertal
	FW	Kai Michalke	5 April 1976 (aged 16)	5	1	(German Football Association) VfL Bochum

=== Northern Ireland ===
Head coach:

=== Scotland ===
Head coach:

== Group D ==
=== France ===
Head coach:

=== Hungary ===
Head coach:

=== Israel ===
Head coach:

=== Portugal ===
Head coach:
