= Montenegro national under-17 football team =

Junior Football Team

Montenegro
- Nickname: Hrabri Sokoli (The Brave Falcons)
- Association: Football Association of Montenegro
- Confederation: UEFA (Europe)
- Head coach: Radovan Kavaja
- Captain: Lazar Popović
- Home stadium: Stadion pod Goricom, Podgorica
- FIFA code: MNE
First colours	Second colours

First international
- Belgium 2–0 Montenegro (Brussels, Belgium; 22 October 2007)

Biggest win
- Montenegro 4–0 Norway (Bar, Montenegro; 31 March 2026)

Biggest defeat
- Denmark 8–1 Montenegro (Montenegro; 28 September 2009)

World Cup
- Appearances: 1 (first in 2026)
- Best result: TBD (2026)

European Championship
- Appearances: 1 (first in 2026)
- Best result: Group stage (2026)

The Montenegro national under-17 football team is the national under-17 football team of Montenegro and is controlled by the Football Association of Montenegro. The team competes in the European Under-17 Football Championship, held every year.

== FIFA U-17 World Cup record ==
Year	Round	GP	W	D*	L	GS	GA
FIFA Under-16 World Championship
(China) 1985	Part of Yugoslavia						
(Canada) 1987	Part of Yugoslavia						
(Scotland) 1989	Part of Yugoslavia						
(Italy) 1991	Part of Yugoslavia						
FIFA Under-17 World Championship
(Japan) 1993	Part of Federal Republic of Yugoslavia (1992-2003), Serbia and Montenegro (2003-2006)						
(Ecuador) 1995	Part of Federal Republic of Yugoslavia (1992-2003), Serbia and Montenegro (2003-2006)						
(Egypt) 1997	Part of Federal Republic of Yugoslavia (1992-2003), Serbia and Montenegro (2003-2006)						
(New Zealand) 1999	Part of Federal Republic of Yugoslavia (1992-2003), Serbia and Montenegro (2003-2006)						
(Trinidad and Tobago) 2001	Part of Federal Republic of Yugoslavia (1992-2003), Serbia and Montenegro (2003-2006)						
(Finland) 2003	Part of Federal Republic of Yugoslavia (1992-2003), Serbia and Montenegro (2003-2006)						
(Peru) 2005	Part of Federal Republic of Yugoslavia (1992-2003), Serbia and Montenegro (2003-2006)						
FIFA Under-17 World Cup
(South Korea) 2007	Did not qualify						
(Nigeria) 2009	Did not qualify						
(Mexico) 2011	Did not qualify						
(United Arab Emirates) 2013	Did not qualify						
(Chile) 2015	Did not qualify						
(India) 2017	Did not qualify						
(Brazil) 2019
(Peru) ~~2021~~	Cancelled due to COVID-19 pandemic						
(Indonesia) 2023	Did not qualify						
(Qatar) 2025	Did not qualify						
(Qatar) 2026	In progress	1	0	1	0	1	1
(Qatar) 2027	To be determined						
(Qatar) 2028	To be determined						
(Qatar) 2029	To be determined						
Total:1/21	TBD	1	0	1	0	1	1

== UEFA European Under-17 Championship record ==
Year	Round	GP	W	D*	L	GS	GA
(Belgium) 2007	Did not qualify						
(Turkey) 2008	Did not qualify						
(Germany) 2009	Did not qualify						
(Liechtenstein) 2010	Did not qualify						
(Serbia) 2011	Did not qualify						
(Slovenia) 2012	Did not qualify						
(Slovakia) 2013	Did not qualify						
(Malta) 2014	Did not qualify						
(Bulgaria) 2015	Did not qualify						
(Azerbaijan) 2016	Did not qualify						
(Croatia) 2017	Did not qualify						
(England) 2018	Did not qualify						
(Republic of Ireland) 2019	Did not qualify						
~~(Estonia) 2020~~	Cancelled due to COVID-19 pandemic						
~~(Cyprus) 2021~~	Cancelled due to COVID-19 pandemic						
(Israel) 2022	did not qualify						
(Hungary) 2023	did not qualify						
(Cyprus) 2024	did not qualify						
(Albania) 2025	did not qualify						
(Estonia) 2026	Group stage	3	0	0	3	1	10
(Latvia) 2027	To be determined						
(Lithuania) 2028	To be determined						
(Moldova) 2029	To be determined						
Total:1/20	Group stage	3	0	0	3	1	10

== Players ==
=== Current squad ===
- The following players were called up for the 2026 UEFA European Under-17 Championship qualification matches.
- Match dates: 25–31 March 2026
- Opposition: Greece, Sweden and Norway
- Caps and goals correct as of: 28 March 2026, after the match against Norway

No.	Pos.	Player	Date of birth (age)	Caps	Goals	Club
1	GK	Danilo Koljčević	29 January 2010 (age 16)	1	0	(Football Association of Serbia) RFK Grafičar Beograd
12	GK	Simon Sošić	9 July 2010 (age 16)	6	0	(Football Association of Montenegro) Budućnost Podgorica
2	DF	Andrej Krunić	25 September 2009 (age 17)	2	0	(Football Association of Montenegro) FK Kom
3	DF	Luka Marković	8 January 2009 (age 17)	6	0	(Football Association of Montenegro) Stari Aerodrom Podgorica
4	DF	Blagoje Uzunovski	12 February 2009 (age 17)	4	0	(Football Association of Serbia) FK IMT
5	DF	Aleksa Peković	1 January 2009 (age 17)	4	0	Free agent
6	DF	Lazar Popović	19 March 2009 (age 17)	9	0	(Football Association of Montenegro) Budućnost Podgorica
15	DF	Petar Radomirović	29 September 2009 (age 17)	7	0	(Football Association of Montenegro) Stari Aerodrom Podgorica
16	DF	Stefan Nedić	2 January 2009 (age 17)	3	0	(Football Association of Montenegro) Stari Aerodrom Podgorica
7	MF	Nemanja Kljajević	21 January 2010 (age 16)	5	1	(Football Association of Montenegro) Grbalj
8	MF	Matija Rakčević	26 January 2009 (age 17)	4	0	(Football Association of Montenegro) Budućnost Podgorica
10	MF	Mark Đokaj	15 January 2009 (age 17)	9	0	(Football Association of Montenegro) FK Dečić
11	MF	Vesko Čukić	24 April 2009 (age 17)	6	2	(Football Association of Serbia) Red Star Belgrade
13	MF	Mateja Sekulić	1 August 2009 (age 17)	1	0	(Football Association of Montenegro) FK Rudar Pljevlja
17	MF	Petar Vujović	11 October 2009 (age 17)	8	4	(Football Association of Montenegro) Budućnost Podgorica
9	FW	Miloš Šekularac	9 July 2009 (age 17)	5	0	(Football Association of Montenegro) Stari Aerodrom Podgorica
14	FW	Blažo Đukić	13 April 2009 (age 17)	4	2	(Football Association of Montenegro) FK Sutjeska Nikšić
18	FW	Aleksa Caušević	30 October 2010 (age 16)	4	1	(Football Association of Montenegro) Budućnost Podgorica
19	FW	Luka Vušurović	2 January 2010 (age 16)	4	2	(Football Association of Serbia) Red Star Belgrade
20	FW	Petar Begović	29 September 2009 (age 17)	4	0	(Football Association of Serbia) FK Teleoptik
