= Christ Batola =

French footballer (born 2009)

Personal information
- Full name: Christ Brunel Neyjunior Batola
- Date of birth: 3 June 2009 (age 17)
- Place of birth: Bondy, France
- Height: 1.87 m (6 ft 2 in)
- Position: Forward

Team information
- Current team: Troyes
- Number: 37

Youth career
- –2020: ES Nangis
- 2020–2022: RCP Fontainebleau
- 2023–: Troyes

Senior career*
Years	Team	Apps	(Gls)
2025–	Troyes B	15	(12)
2026–	Troyes	0	(0)

International career^{‡}
2024–2025	France U16	11	(12)
2025–2026	France U17	20	(4)
2025–	France U18	3	(1)
2026–	France U19	1	(0)
- * Club domestic league appearances and goals ‡ National team caps and goals as of 25 September 2026

Christ Brunel Neyjunior Batola (born 3 June 2009) is a French professional footballer who plays as a forward for Ligue 1 club Troyes.

== Early life ==
Batola was born on 3 June 2009 and is the son of Brunel. Born in Bondy, France, and is a native of the city. Growing up, he regarded France international Kylian Mbappé as his football idol.

== Club career ==
As a youth player, Bartola joined the youth academy of ES Nangis at the age of five. Following his stint there, he joined the youth academy of RCP Fontainebleau in 2020.

Subsequently, he joined the youth academy of ES Troyes AC after receiving interest from the youth academies of Lille OSC and Stade Brestois 29 and was promoted to the club's reserve team in 2025. In 2026, he trained with the youth academy of English Premier League side Manchester City FC. Ahead of the 2026–27 season, he was promoted to the senior team of ESTAC.

== International career ==
Born in France, Batola is of Congolese descent. He is a French youth international and has represented the country internationally at under-15, under-16, under-17, under-18 and under-19 level. Altogether, he made eleven appearances and scored twelve goals while playing for the France national under-16 football team.

During May and June 2025, he played for the France national under-17 football team at the 2025 UEFA European Under-17 Championship. One year later, he played for the France national under-17 football team at the 2026 UEFA European Under-17 Championship.
