= Maël Gernigon =

French footballer (born 2009)

Personal information
- Date of birth: 1 October 2009 (age 17)
- Place of birth: Angers, France
- Position: Centre-back

Team information
- Current team: Angers
- Number: 34

Youth career
- 2016–2026: Angers

Senior career*
Years	Team	Apps	(Gls)
2025–2026	Angers II	8	(1)
2026–	Angers	2	(0)

International career^{‡}
2024	France U15	2	(0)
2024–2025	France U16	7	(0)
2025–2026	France U17	11	(0)
2026–	France U18	2	(0)
- * Club domestic league appearances and goals as of 22:22, 15 November 2026 (UTC) ‡ National team caps and goals as of 13 October 2026

Maël Gernigon (born 1 October 2009) is a French professional footballer who plays as a centre-back for Ligue 1 club Angers.

== Club career ==
Born in Angers, Gernigon is a youth product of Angers, joining the club in September 2026.

In December 2025, he signed his first professional contract with Angers, as he had already with the National 3 reserve team.

He signed a contract extension on the summer 2026, making the pre-season with the first team.

Gernigon made his professional debut with Angers in a 5–1 Ligue 1 loss to Stade Brestois 29 on 10 October 2026. He replaced Yassin Belkhdim at the 62nd minute, taking the place of just sent off Jordan Lefort in the center of the défense, as his team were already losing 5–1.

== International career ==
Gernigon is a youth international for France, having played for the under-16 and under-17.

With the latter, he was among the key players of the French team at the 2026 European Under-17 Championship, where they reached the semi-final.

== Style of play ==
A central defender also able to play as a fullback, Gernigon has been described as a calm and precise player, earning him comparaisons with the likes of Dutch international Nathan Aké.
