= Rubén Gómez (footballer, born 2009) =

Spanish footballer (born 2009)

Personal information
- Full name: Rubén Gómez Hernández
- Date of birth: 12 September 2009 (age 17)
- Place of birth: Spain
- Height: 1.92 m (6 ft 4 in)
- Position: Winger

Team information
- Current team: Atlético Madrid

Youth career
- Puerto Malagueño
- Atlético Madrid

International career^{‡}
| Years | Team | Apps | (Gls) |
| 2024 | Spain U15 | 4 | (1) |
| 2024 | Spain U16 | 3 | (0) |
| 2025– | Spain U17 | 11 | (2) |
- ‡ National team caps and goals as of 21 March 2026

Rubén Gómez Hernández (born 12 September 2009) is a Spanish professional footballer who plays as a winger for Atlético Madrid.

== Early life ==
Gómez was born on 12 September 2009. Born in Spain, he is a native of Andalusia, Spain.

== Club career ==
As a youth player, Gómez joined the youth academy of Puerto Malagueño. Following his stint there, he joined the youth academy of La Liga side Atlético Madrid, where he played in the UEFA Youth League.

== International career ==
Gómez is a Spain youth international. During the spring of 2026, he played for the Spain national under-17 football team for 2026 UEFA European Under-17 Championship qualification.

== Style of play ==
Domínguez plays as a attacker. Spanish newspaper Marca wrote in 2024 that he is "an attacker who roams across the entire front line, a dribbler, brave, and with an eye for goal".
