= Sergi Mayans =

Spanish footballer (born 2009)

Personal information
- Full name: Sergi Mayans Mayol
- Date of birth: 30 January 2009 (age 17)
- Place of birth: L'Hospitalet de l'Infant, Spain
- Height: 1.84 m (6 ft 0 in)
- Position: Defender

Team information
- Current team: Barcelona

Youth career
- Reus
- Barcelona

International career^{‡}
Years	Team	Apps	(Gls)
2023–2024	Spain U15	5	(0)
2025	Spain U16	3	(0)
2025–2026	Spain U17	7	(2)
- ‡ National team caps and goals as of 4 June 2026

Sergi Mayans Mayol (born 30 January 2009) is a Spanish footballer who plays as a defender for Barcelona.

== Early life ==
Mayans was born on 30 January 2009. Born in L'Hospitalet de l'Infant, Spain, he is a native of the city.

== Club career ==
As a youth player, Mayans joined the youth academy of Reus. Following his stint there, he joined the youth academy of La Liga side Barcelona at the age of nine.

In 2025, his contract with the club was renewed until 2028 and he was promoted to their under-19 team. Ahead of the 2026–27 season, he trained with their reserve team.

== International career ==
Mayans is a Spain youth international and has represented the country internationally at under-15, under-16, and under-17 level. On 4 October 2023, he debuted for the Spain national under-15 football team during a 3–1 away friendly win over the Wales national under-15 football team.

On 22 April 2025, he debuted for the Spain national under-16 football team during a 2–0 home friendly win over the Austria national under-16 football team. During May and June 2026, he played for the Spain national under-17 football team at the 2026 UEFA European Under-17 Championship.

== Style of play ==
Mayans plays as a defender and is left-footed. Initially, he played as a left-back before switching to centre-back.

Spanish news website LaDobleC wrote in 2025 that he "already stands at 1.87 meters , a height that, combined with his excellent positioning and composure, allows him to dominate in the air and in one-on-one duels. His left-footedness also gives him added value in building attacks from the back... [has] the ability to anticipate plays , clean ball distribution , and quiet leadership from the back".
