= Frederik Vestergaard =

Danish footballer (born 2009)

Personal information
- Date of birth: 10 May 2009 (age 17)
- Place of birth: Skjern, Denmark
- Position: Midfielder

Team information
- Current team: Midtjylland

Youth career
- Skjern GF
- –2022: FC Midtjylland
- 2022–2024: Esbjerg fB
- 2024–: FC Midtjylland

International career^{‡}
Years	Team	Apps	(Gls)
2024–2025	Denmark U16	8	(1)
2025–2026	Denmark U17	16	(2)
- ‡ National team caps and goals as of 17 June 2026

Frederik Vestergaard (born 10 May 2009) is a Danish professional footballer who plays as a midfielder for Midtjylland.

== Club career ==
Growing up in Skjern, Vestergaard went through the FC Midtjylland Academy, spending two years at Esbjerg fB, before returning to Midtjylland.

In May 2024, he signed his first academy contract with Midtjylland.

During the 2025–26 season, after he first made stride with the under-19 team, Vestergaard started playing with Midtjylland's first team in the Danish Superliga.

== International career ==
Vestergaard is a youth international for Denmark, having played for the under-16 and under-17.

With the Danish U17, he played the 2026 European Championship as a leader, where his team missed the semi-final despite drawing 3–3 with eventual winners Italy. Vestergaard was named in the team of the tournament.

== Career statistics ==
As of match played 10 September 2026

Appearances and goals by club, season and competition
Club	Season	League			Danish Cup		Europe		Other		Total	
Club	Season	Division	Apps	Goals	Apps	Goals	Apps	Goals	Apps	Goals	Apps	Goals
Midtjylland	2026–27	Danish Superliga	0	0	1	0	—		—		1	0
Career total			0	0	1	0	0	0	0	0	1	0

== Honours ==
Individual

- UEFA European Under-17 Championship Team of the Tournament: 2026
