= Jordi Pesquer =

Spanish footballer (born 2009)

Personal information
- Full name: Jordi Pesquer Barraquer
- Date of birth: 26 January 2009 (age 17)
- Place of birth: Barcelona, Spain
- Height: 1.83 m (6 ft 0 in)
- Position: Left-back

Team information
- Current team: Barcelona B
- Number: 35

Youth career
- Llinars
- Barcelona

Senior career*
Years	Team	Apps	(Gls)
2026–	Barcelona B	0	(0)

International career^{‡}
2023–2024	Spain U15	8	(0)
2024	Spain U16	2	(0)
2025–2026	Spain U17	15	(2)
- * Club domestic league appearances and goals ‡ National team caps and goals as of 4 June 2026

Jordi Pesquer Barraquer (born 26 January 2009) is a Spanish professional footballer who plays as a left-back for Segunda Federación club Barcelona Atlètic.

== Early life ==
Pesquer was born on 26 January 2009 and is the son of Joan and Belén. Born in Barcelona, Catalonia, he is a native of Llinars del Vallès, Spain. Growing up, he enjoyed skiing.

== Club career ==
As a youth player, Pesquer joined the youth academy of CE Llinars. Following his stint there, he joined the youth academy of La Liga side Barcelona and was promoted to the club's senior team ahead of the 2026–27 season under German manager Hansi Flick.

== International career ==
Pesquer is a Spain youth international and has represented the country internationally at under-15, under-16, and under-17 levels. On 6 December 2023, he debuted for the Spain national under-15 football team during a 6–0 away friendly win over the Saudi Arabia national under-15 football team. Altogether, he made eight appearances and scored zero goals while playing for the Spain national under-15 football team.

On 17 September 2024, he debuted for the Spain national under-16 football team during a 3–2 away friendly win over the Italy national under-16 football team. Altogether, he made two appearances and scored zero goals while playing for the Spain national under-16 football team. During May and June 2026, he played for the Spain national under-17 football team at the 2026 UEFA European Under-17 Championship.

== Style of play ==
Pesquer plays as a defender and is left-footed. Spanish newspaper Mundo Deportivo wrote in 2026 that he "is an attacking full-back who is comfortable playing in central positions when the winger is wide. From that position, his crossing ability is particularly noteworthy. He has a good touch to deliver crosses both from set pieces and open play. Technically, he is a complete player".
