= Jakov Dedić =

Croatian footballer (born 2009)

Personal information
- Date of birth: 27 August 2009 (age 17)
- Place of birth: Osijek, Croatia
- Height: 1.90 m (6 ft 3 in)
- Position: Forward

Team information
- Current team: TSG Hoffenheim II
- Number: 36

Youth career
- KNŠ Hypo-Limač
- 2020–2025: Osijek

Senior career*
Years	Team	Apps	(Gls)
2025–2026	Osijek	3	(0)
2026–	TSG Hoffenheim II	7	(2)

International career^{‡}
2024	Croatia U15	2	(0)
2025–2026	Croatia U17	15	(13)
- * Club domestic league appearances and goals as of 08:54, 30 September 2026 (UTC) ‡ National team caps and goals as of 16 June 2026

Jakov Dedić (born 27 August 2009) is a Croatian professional footballer who plays as a forward for 3. Liga club TSG Hoffenheim II.

== Club career ==
Born in Osijek, Dedić is a youth product of ŠNK Baranja Belje, KNŠ Hypo-Limač and NK Osijek.

On the summer 2025, he started playing with Osijek's first team, making his debut and scored against Cibalia.

Dedić made his professional debut with Osijek in a 2–1 Croatian Football League loss to NK Varazdin on 8 February 2026.

On 6 July 2026, Dedić signed a five-year contract with TSG Hoffenheim in Germany, initially joining their reserve team TSG Hoffenheim II in 3. Liga.

== International career ==
Dedić is a youth international for Croatia, having played for the under-17 since 2025.

With the latter, he played a central role in Croatia's run to the 2026 Euro under-17, narrowly missing the semi-final of the tournament despite beating Ebrima Tunkara's Spain 3–2. He scored 3 goals in this game, enough to make him the best scorer of the European Championship.

Dedić was one of the players who were called up with the Croatia U17 for the 2026 FIFA U-17 World Cup in Qatar, by head coach Marijan Budimir.

== Honours ==
Individual

- UEFA European Under-17 Championship top scorer: 2026
- UEFA European Under-17 Championship Team of the Tournament: 2026
