= Leo Lemaitre =

French footballer (born 2010)

Personal information
- Full name: Leo Lemaitre Lezcano
- Date of birth: 20 March 2009 (age 17)
- Place of birth: Zaragoza, Spain
- Height: 1.94 m (6 ft 4 in)
- Position: Defender

Team information
- Current team: Real Madrid

Youth career
- 2015–2019: EM El Olivar
- 2019–2021: Zaragoza
- 2021–: Real Madrid

International career^{‡}
Years	Team	Apps	(Gls)
2024	Spain U15	6	(0)
2024	Spain U16	2	(0)
2025–	France U17	8	(1)
- ‡ National team caps and goals as of 4 June 2026

Leo Lemaitre Lezcano (French: Léo Lemaître; born 20 March 2009) is a footballer who plays as a defender for Real Madrid. Born in Spain, he has represented Spain and France internationally at youth level.

== Early life ==
Lemaitre was born on 20 March 2009. Born in Zaragoza, Spain, he is a native of the city. Born to a French volleyball player father and a Spanish mother, he is fluent in the French language and obtained French citizenship and Spanish citizenship.

== Club career ==
As a youth player, Lemaitre joined the youth academy of Spanish side EM El Olivar, where he played for the club's under-10 team. Following his stint there, he joined the youth academy of Spanish side Zaragoza in 2019 after being scouted by the club's scouts.

Ahead of the 2021–22 season, he joined the youth academy of Spanish La Liga side Real Madrid at the age of twelve, where he was regarded to have established himself as a regular starter while playing for the club and helped their under-19 team win the 2025–26 UEFA Youth League. In 2026, he signed his first professional contract with them with a €100 million release clause.

== International career ==
Lemaitre is a Spain and France youth international and has represented Spain internationally at under-15 and under-16 levels and France internationally at under-17 level. On 5 March 2024, he debuted for the Spain national under-15 football team during a 1–1 away friendly draw with the Italy national under-15 football team. On 16 September 2024, he debuted for the Spain national under-16 football team during a 3–2 away friendly win over the Italy national under-16 football team.

On 17 September 2025, he debuted for the France national under-17 football team during a 3–0 home friendly win over the Finland national under-17 football team. During the spring of 2026, he played for the France national under-17 football team for 2026 UEFA European Under-17 Championship qualification. The same year, he played for the France national under-17 football team at the 2026 UEFA European Under-17 Championship.

== Style of play ==
Lemaitre plays as a defender. Left-footed, he has received comparisons to Spain international Dean Huijsen.

Spanish news website Fichajes.com wrote in 2026 he "[is] a very strong player, over 1.90 meters tall... this certainly helps him in aerial duels, but Lemaitre is, above all, a modern defender, with qualities practically equivalent to those of a midfielder: technically gifted, skillful in ball distribution, intelligent in decision-making, and with a great capacity for anticipation and reading the game".
