= Diego Perillo =

Italian footballer (born 2009)

Personal information
- Date of birth: 17 March 2009 (age 17)
- Place of birth: Prato, Italy
- Position: Centre-forward

Team information
- Current team: Atalanta U20

Youth career
- Maliseti Tobbianese
- 2017–2026: Empoli
- 2026–: Atalanta

International career^{‡}
Years	Team	Apps	(Gls)
2025	Italy U16	3	(0)
2025–	Italy U17	18	(13)
2026–	Italy U18	7	(5)
Medal record
Men's football
Representing Italy
UEFA European Under-17 Championship
Winner	2026 Estonia
- ‡ National team caps and goals as of 29 September 2026

Diego Perillo (born 17 March 2009) is an Italian footballer who plays as a forward for the under-20 team (Campionato Primavera 1) of Serie A club Atalanta.

== Club career ==
Born in Prato, Perillo played for Maliseti Tobbianese in his hometown, before joining the youth academy of Empoli. He began playing for the club's Primavera team during the 2025–26 season, as well as for their under-17 side, where he scored 23 goals in 23 games.

On 1 July 2026, he joined the youth academy of Atalanta ahead of the 2026–27 season.

== International career ==
Perillo represented Italy at youth level, playing for their under-16 and under-17 sides.

In May 2026, he was selected for Italy's squad at the 2026 UEFA European Under-17 Championship in Estonia. There, he helped Italy reach the final after beating Spain in a penalty shootout, before scoring the winning penalty in the shootout during the final against Belgium.

Perillo was one of the players who were called up with the Italy U17s on 11 November 2026, by head coach Daniele Franceschini for the 2026 FIFA U-17 World Cup in Qatar.

== Honours ==
Italy U17

- UEFA European Under-17 Championship: 2026

Individual

- UEFA European Under-17 Championship Team of the Tournament: 2026
