= José Félix Guerrero =

Spanish footballer (born 1975)

Personal information
- Full name: José Félix Guerrero López
- Date of birth: 23 August 1975 (age 51)
- Place of birth: Portugalete, Spain
- Height: 1.75 m (5 ft 9 in)
- Position: Central midfielder

Youth career
- Athletic Bilbao

Senior career*
Years	Team	Apps	(Gls)
1995–1996	Bilbao Athletic	28	(3)
1996–1997	Athletic Bilbao	0	(0)
1996–1997	→ Eibar (loan)	36	(5)
1997–1998	Racing Santander	28	(1)
1999–2002	Real Sociedad	30	(1)
2001–2002	→ Eibar (loan)	38	(6)
2002	Burgos	0	(0)
Total		160	(16)

International career
1991–1992	Spain U16	17	(2)
1992–1993	Spain U17	7	(1)
1994	Spain U18	9	(0)
1995	Spain U19	2	(0)
1998	Spain U21	3	(0)
1997	Spain U23	2	(0)
- * Club domestic league appearances and goals

José Félix Guerrero López (born 23 August 1975) is a Spanish former professional footballer who played as a central midfielder.

== Club career ==
Guerrero was born in Portugalete, Basque Country. Brought up in Athletic Bilbao's prolific youth ranks, Lezama, he made his senior debut in 1995–96, suffering Segunda División relegation with the B team. In the following season, as Luis Fernández replaced Dragoslav Stepanović as manager, he was again deemed surplus to requirements and loaned, going on to experience one of his best years as a professional with neighbours SD Eibar in the same level.

Released by Athletic in the summer of 1997, Guerrero signed for Racing de Santander of La Liga, starting in most of the matches during the campaign and making his debut in the competition on 26 October in a 2–0 away loss against FC Barcelona. He scored his first goal on 7 December in the 2–1 comeback win at CP Mérida, as the Cantabrians eventually retained their status.

Subsequently, Guerrero joined another club in his native region, Real Sociedad. He was sparingly used over a three-year spell, due to a serious knee injury.

In 2002, Guerrero moved to Segunda División B side Burgos CF on a free transfer. He retired from the game before the season started, aged only 27.

== Personal life ==
Guerrero's older brother, Julen, was also a footballer and a midfielder. He too represented Athletic Bilbao, and appeared for Spain in two FIFA World Cups.

== Honours ==
Spain U21

- UEFA European Under-21 Championship: 1998

Spain U16

- UEFA European Under-17 Championship runner-up: 1992
