= Enzo Alves =

Spanish professional footballer (born 2009)

Personal information
- Full name: Enzo Alves Vieira
- Date of birth: 16 September 2009 (age 17)
- Place of birth: Madrid, Spain
- Position: Forward

Team information
- Current team: Real Madrid
- Number: 39

Youth career
- 2014–2017: Santa Ana
- 2017–: Real Madrid

Senior career*
Years	Team	Apps	(Gls)
2026–	Real Madrid	0	(0)

International career^{‡}
2023–2024	Spain U15	5	(4)
2024–2025	Spain U16	4	(2)
2025–	Spain U17	6	(2)
- * Club domestic league appearances and goals as of 17:04, 31 July 2023 (UTC) ‡ National team caps and goals as of 03:45, 1 December 2025 (UTC)

Enzo Alves Vieira (born 16 September 2009) is a Spanish professional footballer who plays as a forward for La Liga club Real Madrid.

== Early life ==
Alves was born in Madrid to Brazilian international footballer Marcelo and actress Clarice Alves.

== Club career ==
Alves began his career with Santa Ana, where he spent three years before a move to Real Madrid, the club where his father had played for fifteen years. On his debut for the club's 'Infantil B' side, he scored a hat-trick. During his first years in the academy, he drew attention on social media as clips of his footballing ability were posted by his family.

In the 2018–19 season, Alves scored twenty-four goals, helping Real Madrid's 'Benjamin A' side to the title. Following his promotion to the 'Alevín A' side, he was part of the squad for the La Liga Promises tournament in 2021. In December of the following year, he signed his first contract with the club, having represented Real Madrid at the La Liga Promises tournament again, as the club won the competition earlier in the year.

Promoted to the 'Infantil A' side in the 2022–23 season, Alves notably scored a twenty-minute hat-trick against rivals Atlético Madrid on 11 January 2023 as his side won 5–2. In his first hundred games for the youth teams of Real Madrid, he scored 105 goals, earning praise from Spanish sports newspaper Marca for his goal-scoring ability, being labelled a "scoring machine".

== International career ==
Though both of his parents are Brazilian, he was born in Spain, making him eligible to represent both nations. In April 2023, he chose to represent Spain, having been called up to their under-15 side for the Pinatar Cup. He made his debut for the side in the final game, featuring in a 2–1 win against England.
