= Joaquín Sánchez =

Joaquín Sánchez may refer to:

- Joaquín Sánchez de Toca (1852–1942), Spanish conservative politician and former prime minister
- Joaquín Sánchez Rodríguez (born 1981), Spanish footballer and Real Betis player
- Joaquín Sánchez (Colombian footballer) (1941–2020), Colombian footballer
