= Michael Bochtler =

German footballer and manager

Personal information
- Date of birth: 15 October 1975 (age 51)
- Place of birth: Ulm, West Germany
- Height: 1.76 m (5 ft 9 in)
- Position: Defender

Youth career
- TSV Steinberg/Staig
- –1992: SSV Ulm
- 1992–1993: VfB Stuttgart

Senior career*
Years	Team	Apps	(Gls)
1993–1998	VfB Stuttgart	35	(1)
1996–1997	FC St. Pauli	19	(0)
1998–2001	Sturm Graz	14	(0)
2001–2004	VfR Aalen	99	(3)
2004–2005	FC Nöttingen	26	(0)
2005	FV Illertissen		
2005–2006	Carl Zeiss Jena	2	(0)
2006–2008	FV Illertissen		

International career
1994	Germany U18	1	(0)
1996–1998	Germany U21	11	(1)
- * Club domestic league appearances and goals

Michael Bochtler (born 15 October 1975) is a German former professional footballer who played as a defender.
