= Abdou Kemo Badji =

Spanish footballer (born 2009)

Personal information
- Full name: Abdou Kemo Badji Fall
- Date of birth: 5 March 2009 (age 17)
- Height: 1.73 m (5 ft 8 in)
- Position: Winger

Team information
- Current team: Atlético Madrid

Youth career
- –2024: Espanyol
- 2024–: Atlético Madrid

International career^{‡}
Years	Team	Apps	(Gls)
2023	Spain U16	3	(0)
2025–	Spain U17	8	(1)
- ‡ National team caps and goals as of 23 April 2026

Abdou Kemo Badji Fall (born 5 March 2009) is a Spanish professional footballer who plays as a winger for Atlético Madrid.

== Club career ==
As a youth player, Badji joined the youth academy of Puerto Malagueño. Following his stint there, he joined the youth academy of La Liga side Atlético Madrid, where he played in the UEFA Youth League. African news website Foot Africa wrote in 2025 that he "quickly established himself as one of the most promising talents in Atlético's youth ranks" while playing for the club.

== International career ==
Born in Spain, Badji is of Senegalese descent. He is a Spain youth international. During the autumn of 2025 and the spring of 2026, he played for the Spain national under-17 football team for 2026 UEFA European Under-17 Championship qualification.

== Style of play ==
Badji plays as a winger. Two-footed, he is known for his strength.
