= Elie Mbavu =

Belgian footballer (born 2009)

Personal information
- Date of birth: 20 October 2009 (age 17)
- Place of birth: Brussels, Belgium
- Height: 1.88 m (6 ft 2 in)
- Position: Centre-back

Team information
- Current team: Jong Genk
- Number: 73

Youth career
- Sporting Bruxelles
- 2014–2025: Genk

Senior career*
Years	Team	Apps	(Gls)
2025–	Jong Genk	27	(0)

International career^{‡}
2024	Belgium U15	4	(0)
2024–2025	Belgium U16	6	(0)
2025–	Belgium U17	9	(0)
Medal record
Men's football
Representing Belgium
UEFA European Under-17 Championship
Runner-up	2026 Estonia
- * Club domestic league appearances and goals as of 4 June 2026 ‡ National team caps and goals as of 8 June 2026

Elie Mbavu (born 20 October 2009) is a Belgian professional footballer who plays as a centre-back for Jong Genk.

== Club career ==
Born in Brussels, Mbavu is a youth product of Sporting Bruxelles and KRC Genk, where he signed his first contract in November 2024.

During the 2024–25 season he was a standout with the club's U18 and U19 in the Youth League.

Mbavu made his professional debut with the reserve team in a 3–0 Challenger Pro League loss to Club NXT on 14 March 2025.

== International career ==
Born in Belgium, Mbavu also has Congolese origins. He is a youth international for Belgium, having played for the under-15 and under-16.

He then captained the under-17 team to the European Under-17 Championship in May and June 2026. Belgium reached the final of the competition after beating Believe Munongo's French team 2–1, a first in the nation's history, after 4 semi-final exits, including twice against France.

== Honours ==
Belgium U17

- UEFA European Under-17 Championship runner-up: 2026
