= Daniele Franceschini =

Italian footballer and manager (born 1976)

Personal information
- Date of birth: 13 January 1976 (age 50)
- Place of birth: Rome, Italy
- Height: 1.80 m (5 ft 11 in)
- Position: Winger

Team information
- Current team: Italy U17 (manager)

Youth career
- 1993–1995: Lazio

Senior career*
| Years | Team | Apps | (Gls) |
| 1995–1997 | Lazio | 3 | (0) |
| 1997 | → Castel di Sangro (loan) | 8 | (0) |
| 1997–1998 | Foggia | 34 | (2) |
| 1998–2006 | Chievo | 205 | (16) |
| 2004 | → Lecce (loan) | 15 | (2) |
| 2006–2010 | Sampdoria | 101 | (9) |
| 2010–2011 | Atletico Roma | 21 | (2) |

Managerial career
- 2016: Martina Franca
- 2017–2019: Italy U18
- 2019–2020: Italy U20
- 2020–2025: Italy U18
- 2025–: Italy U17
Medal record
Men's football
Representing Italy (as manager)
UEFA European Under-17 Championship
| Winner | 2026 Estonia |
- * Club domestic league appearances and goals

Daniele Franceschini (born 13 January 1976) is an Italian professional football manager and former player who played as a left winger. He is currently in charge of the Italy national under-17 team.

== Club career ==
In mid-2006, Franceschini joined another Serie A club Sampdoria. After 4 seasons in Genoa city, Franceschini moved to Atletico Roma in mid-2010.

== Managerial career ==
In February 2016, Franceschini was appointed as the head coach (Italian: allenatore) of Lega Pro struggler Martina Franca.

In mid-2017, Franceschini was appointed as the coach (Italian: c.t. or Italian: tecnico, lit. 'technician') of Italy national under-18 team. His debut match was a draw. His team won the next match.

Franceschini led the team in 2018 Mediterranean Games. The team won the silver medal.

== Honours ==
=== Managerial ===
Italy U17

- UEFA European Under-17 Championship: 2026
