= Believe Munongo =

French footballer (born 2009)

Personal information
- Date of birth: 23 November 2009 (age 16)
- Place of birth: Metz, France
- Height: 1.91 m (6 ft 3 in)
- Position: Midfielder

Team information
- Current team: Metz
- Number: 33

Youth career
- CO Metz Bellecroix
- –2018: UL Plantières
- 2018–: Metz

Senior career*
Years	Team	Apps	(Gls)
2025	Metz B	4	(0)
2025–	Metz	11	(0)

International career^{‡}
2024	France U16	6	(1)
2025–	France U17	18	(1)
2025–	France U18	3	(0)
- * Club domestic league appearances and goals as of 17 May 2026 ‡ National team caps and goals as of 18 November 2025

Believe Munongo (born 23 November 2009) is a French professional footballer who plays as a midfielder for Metz.

== Early life ==
Munongo was born on 23 November 2009 in Metz, France. The older brother of French footballer Goodness Munongo, he is of Congolese descent through his parents.

== Club career ==
As a youth player, Munongo joined the youth academy of CO Metz Bellecroix. Following his stint there, he joined the youth academy of UL Plantières. Subsequently, he joined the youth academy of Metz and was promoted to the club's senior team in 2025.

== International career ==
Mungongo is a French youth international. During the autumn of 2025, he played for the France national under-17 football team at the 2025 FIFA U-17 World Cup.

== Style of play ==
Mungongo plays as a midfielder. French news website Foot Mercato wrote in 2026 that he "stands out for his physical attributes and recovery ability, as well as his capacity to slow the tempo and initiate transitions".

== Career statistics ==
As of match played 17 May 2026

Appearances and goals by club, season and competition
Club	Season	League			Coupe de France		Other		Total	
Club	Season	Division	Apps	Goals	Apps	Goals	Apps	Goals	Apps	Goals
Metz B	2025–26	National 3	4	0	—		—		4	0
Metz	2025–26	Ligue 1	11	0	1	0	—		12	0
Career total			15	0	1	0	0	0	16	0
