= Gianluca Okon =

Italian footballer (born 2009)

Personal information
- Full name: Gianluca Tommaso Okon-Engstler
- Date of birth: 24 January 2009 (age 17)
- Place of birth: Sydney, Australia
- Height: 1.90 m (6 ft 3 in)
- Position: Defensive midfielder

Team information
- Current team: Club Brugge
- Number: 86

Youth career
- 2019–2025: Club Brugge

Senior career*
Years	Team	Apps	(Gls)
2024–	Club NXT	18	(0)
2026–	Club Brugge	0	(0)

International career^{‡}
2024–2025	Australia U17	2	(0)
2025	Italy U16	3	(0)
2025–	Italy U17	10	(1)
2026–	Italy U18	1	(0)
Medal record
Men's football
Representing Italy
UEFA European Under-17 Championship
Winner	2026 Estonia
- * Club domestic league appearances and goals as of 7 November 2026 ‡ National team caps and goals as of 26 September 2026

Gianluca Tommaso Okon-Engstler (born 24 January 2009) is a footballer who plays as a defensive midfielder for Belgian Pro League club Club Brugge and its reserve team Club NXT. Born in Australia, he has represented Italy and Australia at youth international level.

== Early life ==
Okon was born on 24 January 2009 in Australia. The son of Australia international Paul Okon, he is the younger brother of Australian soccer player Paul Okon-Engstler.

== Club career ==
As a youth player, Okon joined the youth academy of Belgian side Club Brugge. In 2024, he was promoted to the club's reserve team.

== International career ==
Okon-Engstler is eligible to represent Belgium through birth, Australia, Italy and Germany through his father, and Cuba through his mother. Okon is an Australia and Italy youth international. On 4 September 2025, he debuted for the Italy under-17 team during a 2–1 away friendly win over Portugal.

He was one of the players who were called up with the Italy U17s on 11 November 2026, by head coach Manuel Pasqual for the 2026 FIFA U-17 World Cup in Qatar.

== Style of play ==
Okon plays as a defensive midfielder and is right-footed. Italian news website wrote in 2025 that he is "a midfielder with great quality, an excellent right-footed pass, but also good physicality and timing in the box that allow him to see the goal with ease".

== Honours ==
Italy U17

- UEFA European Under-17 Championship: 2026

Individual

- UEFA European Under-17 Championship Team of the Tournament: 2026
