= 2026 UEFA European Under-17 Championship =

Jalgpalli alla 17-aastaste Euroopa meistrivõistlused 2026

Tournament details
- Host country: Estonia
- Dates: 25 May – 7 June
- Teams: 8 (from 1 confederation)

Final positions
- Champions: Italy (3rd title)
- Runners-up: Belgium

Tournament statistics
- Matches played: 15
- Goals scored: 47 (3.13 per match)
- Attendance: 24,755 (1,650 per match)
- Top scorer(s): (Croatia) Jakov Dedić (3 goals)
- Best player: (Spain) Ebrima Tunkara

The 2026 UEFA European Under-17 Championship was the 23rd edition of the UEFA European Under-17 Championship (42nd edition if the Under-16 era is also included), the annual international youth football championship organised by UEFA for the men's under-17 national teams of Europe. Estonia, which were selected by UEFA on 26 September 2023, hosted the tournament.

A total of eight teams played in the tournament, with players born on or after 1 January 2009 eligible to participate.

The tournament and its qualification acted as the UEFA qualifiers for the FIFA U-17 World Cup. The top 11 teams qualified for the 2026 FIFA U-17 World Cup in Qatar as the UEFA representatives.

Italy won the competition for the third time (second in the under-17 era) after defeating Belgium 4–3 on penalties in the final.

== Qualification ==
=== Qualified teams ===
The following teams qualified for the final tournament.

Note: All appearance statistics include only U-17 era (since 2002).

Team	Qualification method	Date of qualification	Appearance(s)				Previous best performance (Note: Bold text indicates they hosted that edition.)
Team	Qualification method	Date of qualification	Total	First	Last	Streak	Previous best performance
Estonia	Host nation	26 September 2023	1st	Debut			
France	Round 2 Group A1 winners	31 March 2026	17th	2002	2025	6	Champions (2004, 2015, 2022)
Italy	Round 2 Group A2 winners	31 March 2026	14th	2003	2025	10	Champions (2024)
Montenegro	Round 2 Group A3 winners	28 March 2026	1st	Debut			
Denmark	Round 2 Group A4 winners	31 March 2026	8th	2002	2024	1	Semi-finals (2011, 2024)
Belgium	Round 2 Group A5 winners	28 March 2026	10th	2006	2025	2	Semi-finals (2007, 2015, 2018, 2025)
Spain	Round 2 Group A6 winners	21 March 2026	17th	2002	2024	1	Champions (2007, 2008, 2017)
Croatia	Round 2 Group A7 winners	31 March 2026	7th	2005	2024	1	Fourth place (2005)

== Venues ==
The tournament was hosted in four venues.

Tallinn			Rakvere	2026 UEFA European Under-17 Championship is located in Estonia
Lilleküla staadion	Kalevi Keskstaadion	Kadrioru staadion	Rakvere staadion	2026 UEFA European Under-17 Championship is located in Estonia
Capacity: 14,336	Capacity: 11,842	Capacity: 5,000	Capacity: 1,831	2026 UEFA European Under-17 Championship is located in Estonia

== Group stage ==
The group winners and runners-up advanced to the semi-finals.

Tie-breaking criteria for group play
The ranking of teams in the group stage was determined as follows:
1. Points obtained in all group matches;
2. Points in head-to-head matches among tied teams;
3. Goal difference in head-to-head matches among tied teams;
4. Goals scored in head-to-head matches among tied teams;
5. If more than two teams were tied, and after applying all head-to-head criteria above, a subset of teams were still tied, all head-to-head criteria above were reapplied exclusively to this subset of teams;
6. Goal difference in all group matches;
7. Goals scored in all group matches;
8. Penalty shoot-out if only two teams had the same number of points, and they met in the last round of the group and were tied after applying all criteria above (not used if more than two teams had the same number of points, or if their rankings were not relevant for qualification for the next stage);
9. Disciplinary points
  - Yellow card: −1 point;
  - Indirect red card (second yellow card): −3 points;
  - Direct red card: −3 points;
10. UEFA coefficient for the qualifying round draw;
11. Drawing of lots.

=== Group A ===
Pos	Team	Pld	W	D	L	GF	GA	GD	Pts	Qualification
1	Belgium	3	2	0	1	3	1	+2	**6 (Note: Ranked on goal difference in head-to-head matches: Belgium +1, Spain 0, Croatia -1.)**	Knockout stage
2	Spain	3	2	0	1	7	4	+3	**6**	Knockout stage
3	Croatia	3	2	0	1	6	5	+1	**6**	
4	Estonia (H)	3	0	0	3	2	8	−6	**0**	

First match(es) will be played: 25 May 2026. Source: UEFA
Rules for classification: Group stage tiebreakers
(H) Hosts
Notes:
25 May 2026
14:30 EEST

Croatia	0–2	Belgium
	Report	Driessen 9'; Moorthamer 13'

Rakvere Linnastaadion, Rakvere
Attendance: 436
Referee: Florian Lata (Albania)
25 May 2026
20:00 EEST

Estonia	1–4	Spain
Neltsas 42'	Report	Urrestarazu 16'; Mayans 30'; Alves 35'; Tunkara 49' (pen.)

Lilleküla Stadium, Tallinn
Attendance: 4,724
Referee: Asker Nadjafaliev (Uzbekistan)

28 May 2026
14:30 EEST

Belgium	0–1	Spain
	Report	Badji 9'

Rakvere Linnastaadion, Rakvere
Attendance: 715
Referee: Alexandros Tsakalidis (Greece)
28 May 2026
19:00 EEST

Estonia	1–3	Croatia
Visse 90'	Report	Žužić Škafar 2', 35'; Benkotić 55' (pen.)

Lilleküla Stadium, Tallinn
Attendance: 3,004
Referee: Oğuzhan Çakır (Turkey)

31 May 2026
14:30 EEST

Spain	2−3	Croatia
Sánchez 56'; Alves 77'	Report	Dedić 3', 82', 89'

Rakvere Linnastaadion, Rakvere
Attendance: 727
Referee: Alexandros Tsakalidis (Greece)
31 May 2026
14:30 EEST

Belgium	1−0	Estonia
Kalonji 41'	Report

Lilleküla Stadium, Tallinn
Attendance: 2,258
Referee: Tom Owen (Wales)

=== Group B ===
Pos	Team	Pld	W	D	L	GF	GA	GD	Pts	Qualification
1	Italy	3	2	1	0	7	3	+4	**7**	Knockout stage
2	France	3	2	0	1	9	1	+8	**6**	Knockout stage
3	Denmark	3	1	1	1	5	8	−3	**4**	
4	Montenegro	3	0	0	3	1	10	−9	**0**	

Source: UEFA
Rules for classification: Group stage tiebreakers
26 May 2026
14:30 EEST

Italy	1–0	France
Perillo 55'	Report

Kalevi Keskstaadion, Tallinn
Attendance: 713
Referee: Alexandros Tsakalidis (Greece)
26 May 2026
19:00 EEST

Montenegro	1–2	Denmark
Đokaj 39'	Report	Hansen 20'; Khatar 76'

Kadrioru staadion, Tallinn
Attendance: 374
Referee: Constantinos Fellas (Cyprus)

29 May 2026
14:30 EEST

Montenegro	0−3	Italy
	Report	Ballarin 5'; Corigliano 26'; Fugazzola 87'

Kalevi Keskstaadion, Tallinn
Attendance: 328
Referee: Tom Owen (Wales)
29 May 2026
19:00 EEST

France	4−0	Denmark
Madsen 51' (o.g.); Tiehi 54'; Gadou 73'; Lemaître 90'	Report

Kadrioru staadion, Tallinn
Attendance: 606
Referee: Asker Nadjafaliev (Uzbekistan)

1 June 2026
14:30 EEST

Denmark	3–3	Italy
Hansen 14'; Ekstrand 58'; Khatar 90+1'	Report	Biondini 24'; Dattilo 42'; Donato 45'

Kalevi Keskstaadion, Tallinn
Attendance: 300
Referee: Oguzhan Çakir (Turkey)
1 June 2026
14:30 EEST

France	5–0	Montenegro
Loufoundou 31'; Batola 45' (pen.); Meïté 56'; Dago 68'; Doganay 70'	Report

Kadrioru staadion, Tallinn
Attendance: 150
Referee: Florian Lata (Albania)

== Knockout stage ==
The winners of each group were paired with the runners-up of the other group, and the allocation of matches to stadiums was only confirmed on 1 June 2026 upon completion of the group stage. In the knockout stage, a penalty shoot-out was used to decide the winner if necessary (no extra time was played).

=== Bracket ===
Semi-finals
4 June – Tallinn
Belgium	2
France	1
4 June – Tallinn
Italy (p)	1 (4)
Spain	1 (2)

Final
7 June – Tallinn
Belgium	1 (3)
Italy (p)	1 (4)

=== Semi-finals ===
4 June 2026
14:30 EEST

Belgium	2−1	France
Onia Seke 25'; Benktib 52'	Report	Gadou 64'

Kadrioru staadion, Tallinn
Attendance: 639
Referee: Oğuzhan Çakır (Turkey)
4 June 2026
20:00 EEST

Italy	1−1	Spain
Croci 42' (pen.)	Report	Urrestarazu 77'
Penalties
Corigliano (penalty scored); Casagrande (penalty scored); Dattilo (penalty scored); Rocca (penalty scored)	4−2	(penalty scored) Mayans; (penalty missed) Mencía; (penalty missed) Alves; (penalty scored) Pesquer

Lilleküla Stadium, Tallinn
Attendance: 2,754
Referee: Tom Owen (Wales)

=== Final ===
7 June 2026
20:00 EEST

Belgium	1−1	Italy
Ojea 85'	Report	Fugazzola 90+1' (pen.)
Penalties
Dierckx (penalty scored); Blondeel (penalty scored); Verstrepen (penalty scored); Ojea (penalty missed); Moorthamer (penalty missed)	3−4	(penalty scored) Fugazzola; (penalty scored) Casagrande; (penalty scored) Okon; (penalty missed) Rocca; (penalty scored) Perillo

Lilleküla Stadium, Tallinn
Attendance: 7,027
Referee: Florian Lata (Albania)

== Goalscorers ==
There were 47 goals scored in 15 matches, for an average of 3.13 goals per match.

3 goals

- (Croatia) Jakov Dedić

2 goals

- (Croatia) Nik Žužić Škafar
- (Denmark) Mikkel Bro Hansen
- (Denmark) Omran Khattar
- (France) Arone Gadou
- (Italy) Marcello Fugazzola
- (Spain) Enzo Alves

1 goal

- (Belgium) Ilyas Benktib
- (Belgium) Jelle Driessen
- (Belgium) Noah Kalonji
- (Belgium) Tinus Moorthamer
- (Belgium) Noa Ojea
- (Belgium) Jayden Onia Seke
- (Croatia) Jona Benkotić
- (Denmark) Tobias Ekstrand
- (Estonia) Ron Neltsas
- (Estonia) Aston Visse
- (France) Christ Batola
- (France) Joshua Dago
- (France) Kénan Doganay
- (France) Léo Lemaître
- (France) Noah Loufoundou
- (France) Mamadou Meïté
- (France) Noha Tiehi
- (Italy) Francesco Ballarin
- (Italy) Edoardo Biondini
- (Italy) Thomas Corigliano
- (Italy) Federico Croci
- (Italy) Lorenzo Dattilo
- (Italy) Andrea Donato
- (Italy) Diego Perillo
- (Montenegro) Mark Đokaj
- (Spain) Abdou Kemo Badji
- (Spain) Sergi Mayans
- (Spain) Joaquín Sánchez
- (Spain) Ebrima Tunkara
- (Spain) Mikel Urrestarazu

1 own goal

- (Denmark) Noah Madsen (against France)

== Awards ==
The following awards were given after the conclusion of the tournament:

- Player of the Tournament: (Spain) Ebrima Tunkara
- Top Scorer: (Croatia) Jakov Dedić

=== Team of the Tournament ===
After the tournament, the Under-17 Team of the Tournament was selected by the UEFA Technical Observer panel.

Position	Player
Goalkeeper	(Italy) Christian Lupo
Defender	(France) Mathis Chambon
Defender	(Italy) Ludovico Varali
Defender	(Belgium) Preben Blondeel
Defender	(Belgium) Sami El Morabet
Midfielder	(Italy) Gianluca Okon
Midfielder	(Denmark) Frederik Vestergaard
Midfielder	(Spain) Ebrima Tunkara
Forward	(Italy) Diego Perillo
Forward	(Croatia) Jakov Dedić
Forward	(Belgium) Jayden Onia Seke
