= Italy national under-17 football team =

Selected team of Italian football players under 17 years

Italy Under-17
- Association: Italian Football Federation (Federazione Italiana Giuoco Calcio – FIGC)
- Confederation: UEFA (Europe)
- Head coach: Manuel Pasqual
- FIFA code: ITA
First colours	Second colours

FIFA U-17 World Cup
- Appearances: 10 (first in 1985)
- Best result: Third place (2025)

European Championship
- Appearances: 25 (first in 1982)
- Best result: Champions (1982, 2024, 2026)
Medal record
Men's football
FIFA U-17 World Cup
Bronze medal – third place	2025 Qatar	Team
UEFA European U-17 Championship Formerly U-16 Championship
Gold medal – first place	1982 Italy	Team
Gold medal – first place	2024 Cyprus	Team
Silver medal – second place	1986 Greece	Team
Silver medal – second place	1993 Turkey	Team
Silver medal – second place	1998 Scotland	Team
Silver medal – second place	2013 Slovakia	Team
Silver medal – second place	2018 England	Team
Silver medal – second place	2019 Republic of Ireland	Team
Bronze medal – third place	1992 Cyprus	Team
Bronze medal – third place	2005 Italy	Team

The Italy national under-17 football team is the national under-17 football team of Italy and is controlled by the Italian Football Federation.

The team competes in the UEFA European Under-17 Championship, held every year. If qualified, the team also competes in the FIFA U-17 World Cup, which since the 2025 edition is also held every year.

== Competitive record ==
=== FIFA Under-17 World Cup ===
Year	Round	Pld	W	D*	L	GF	GA
FIFA Under-16 World Championship
(China) 1985	Group stage	3	1	0	2	3	4
(Canada) 1987	Fourth place	6	3	1	2	8	4
(Scotland) 1989	Did not qualify						
(Italy) 1991	Group stage	3	0	2	1	2	3
FIFA Under-17 World Championship
(Japan) 1993	Group stage	3	0	1	2	1	6
(Ecuador) 1995	Did not qualify						
(Egypt) 1997	Did not qualify						
(New Zealand) 1999	Did not qualify						
(Trinidad and Tobago) 2001	Did not qualify						
(Finland) 2003	Did not qualify						
(Peru) 2005	Group stage	3	1	1	1	6	7
FIFA Under-17 World Cup
(South Korea) 2007	Did not qualify						
(Nigeria) 2009	Quarter-finals	5	3	1	1	6	4
(Mexico) 2011	Did not qualify						
(United Arab Emirates) 2013	Round of 16	4	2	0	2	3	5
(Chile) 2015	Did not qualify						
(India) 2017	Did not qualify						
(Brazil) 2019	Quarter-finals	5	3	0	2	9	5
(Peru) ~~2021~~	Cancelled due to COVID-19 pandemic						
(Indonesia) 2023	Did not qualify						
(Qatar) 2025	Third place	8	6	1	1	14	5
(Qatar) 2026	In progress	1	1	0	0	6	0
(Qatar) 2027	To be determined						
(Qatar) 2028	To be determined						
(Qatar) 2029	To be determined						
Total:10/21	Third place	41	20	7	14	58	43

*Draws include knockout matches decided on penalty kicks.

=== UEFA European Under-17 Championship ===
Year	Round	Pld	W	D*	L	GF	GA	Squad
UEFA European Under-16 Championship
(Italy) 1982	Champions	2	1	1	0	2	1	Squad
(West Germany) 1984	Did not qualify							
(Hungary) 1985	Group stage	3	0	1	2	2	6	Squad
(Greece) 1986	Runners-up	3	2	2	1	7	4	Squad
(France) 1987	~~Champions~~ (Note: Italy won the final of the 1987 UEFA European Under-16 Championship 1–0 against the Soviet Union. However, UEFA ruled that Riccardo Secci had been ineligible to participate in the competition. UEFA stripped Italy of their title and decided to not reaward the under-16 European title that year.)	3	3	2	0	8	4	Squad
(Spain) 1988	Did not qualify							
(Denmark) 1989	Group stage	3	0	2	1	2	3	Squad
(East Germany) 1990	Did not qualify							
(Switzerland) 1991	Did not qualify							
(Cyprus) 1992	Third place	3	3	1	1	8	2	Squad
(Turkey) 1993	Runners-up	3	2	1	0	5	3	Squad
(Republic of Ireland) 1994	Did not qualify							
(Belgium) 1995	Group stage	3	0	2	1	1	2	Squad
(Austria) 1996	Did not qualify							
(Germany) 1997	Group stage	3	0	1	2	6	6	Squad
(Scotland) 1998	Runners-up	5	4	1	1	12	6	Squad
(Czech Republic) 1999	Did not qualify							
(Israel) 2000	Did not qualify							
(England) 2001	Quarter-finals	4	1	2	1	8	7	Squad
UEFA European Under-17 Championship
(Denmark) 2002	Did not qualify							
(Portugal) 2003	Group stage	3	1	1	1	4	2	Squad
(France) 2004	Did not qualify							
(Italy) 2005	Third place	5	3	0	2	4	3	Squad
(Luxembourg) 2006	Did not qualify (Elite round)							
(Belgium) 2007	Did not qualify (Elite round)							
(Turkey) 2008	Did not qualify (Elite round)							
(Germany) 2009	Semi-finals	4	1	1	2	3	6	Squad
(Liechtenstein) 2010	Did not qualify (Qualifying round)							
(Serbia) 2011	Did not qualify (Elite round)							
(Slovenia) 2012	Did not qualify (Elite round)							
(Slovakia) 2013	Runners-up	4	2	3	0	5	2	Squad
(Malta) 2014	Did not qualify (Elite round)							
(Bulgaria) 2015	Quarter-finals	3	1	1	2	3	5	Squad
(Azerbaijan) 2016	Group stage	3	1	0	2	4	6	Squad
(Croatia) 2017	Group stage	3	1	0	2	3	5	Squad
(England) 2018	Runners-up	6	4	1	1	10	5	Squad
(Republic of Ireland) 2019	Runners-up	6	5	0	1	14	8	Squad
(Estonia) ~~2020~~	Cancelled due to the COVID-19 pandemic							
(Cyprus) ~~2021~~	Cancelled due to the COVID-19 pandemic							
(Israel) 2022	Quarter-finals	4	2	0	2	5	5	Squad
(Hungary) 2023	Group stage	3	1	0	2	4	4	Squad
(Cyprus) 2024	Champions	6	5	1	0	11	2	Squad
(Albania) 2025	Semi-finals	4	3	1	0	10	6	Squad
(Estonia) 2026	Champions	5	2	3	0	9	5	Squad
(Latvia) 2027	To be determined							
(Lithuania) 2028	To be determined							
(Moldova) 2029	To be determined							
Total:25/42	3 Titles	94	48	28	29	150	108	-

*Draws include knockout matches decided on penalty kicks.

== Honours ==
- FIFA Under-17 World Cup

- Third place: 2025
- Fourth place: 1987

- UEFA European Under-17 Championship

- Winner: 2024; 2026
- Runners-up: 2013; 2018; 2019
- Third place: 2005

- Under-16 era (1982–2001)

- Winner: 1982
- Runners-up: 1986; 1993; 1998
- Third place: 1992

== Players ==
The following 20 players were called up for the 2026 UEFA European Under-17 Championship.

No.	Pos.	Player	Date of birth (age)	Club
1	GK	Emanuele Giaretta	30 April 2009 (age 17)	(Italian Football Federation) Juventus
12	GK	Christian Lupo	29 May 2009 (age 17)	(Italian Football Federation) Lecce
2	DF	Giampaolo Bonifazi	23 February 2009 (age 17)	(Italian Football Federation) Roma
3	DF	Matteo Albini	4 March 2009 (age 17)	(Italian Football Federation) Como
4	DF	Djibril Diallo	9 March 2009 (age 17)	(Italian Football Federation) Parma
5	DF	Ludovico Varali	17 January 2009 (age 17)	(Italian Football Federation) Parma
6	DF	Andrea Donato	14 January 2009 (age 17)	(Italian Football Federation) Inter
13	DF	Lorenzo Dattilo	5 May 2010 (age 16)	(Italian Football Federation) Roma
14	DF	Lorenzo Puricelli	14 March 2009 (age 17)	(Italian Football Federation) Inter
20	DF	Edoardo Dario Rocca	26 October 2009 (age 17)	(Italian Football Federation) Inter
8	MF	Edoardo Biondini (captain)	1 January 2009 (age 17)	(Italian Football Federation) Empoli
15	MF	Gianluca Okon	24 January 2009 (age 17)	(Royal Belgian Football Association) Club Brugge
16	MF	Francesco Ballarin	21 July 2009 (age 17)	(Italian Football Federation) Venezia
17	MF	Francesco Gasparello	2 January 2009 (age 17)	(Italian Football Federation) Atalanta
7	FW	Jacopo Landi	26 February 2009 (age 17)	(Italian Football Federation) Empoli
9	FW	Diego Perillo	17 March 2009 (age 17)	(Italian Football Federation) Empoli
10	FW	Thomas Corigliano	10 January 2009 (age 17)	(Italian Football Federation) Juventus
11	FW	Marcello Fugazzola	12 February 2009 (age 17)	(Italian Football Federation) Atalanta
19	FW	Tommaso Casagrande	19 July 2009 (age 17)	(Italian Football Federation) Hellas Verona
21	FW	Federico Croci	1 July 2010 (age 16)	(Italian Football Federation) Fiorentina

== See also ==
- FIFA U-17 World Cup
- UEFA European Under-17 Championship
