= Jayden Onia Seke =

Belgian footballer (born 2009)

Personal information
- Date of birth: 8 May 2009 (age 17)
- Place of birth: Brussels, Belgium
- Position: Winger

Team information
- Current team: Anderlecht
- Number: 49

Youth career
- KSC Grimbergen
- 2014–2024: Anderlecht

Senior career*
Years	Team	Apps	(Gls)
2024–2026	RSCA Futures	34	(1)
2026–	Anderlecht	1	(0)

International career^{‡}
2023–2024	Belgium U15	4	(2)
2024–2025	Belgium U16	6	(1)
2025–	Belgium U17	11	(4)
2026–	Belgium U19	3	(1)
Medal record
Men's football
Representing Belgium
UEFA European Under-17 Championship
Runner-up	2026 Estonia
- * Club domestic league appearances and goals as of 25 October 2026 ‡ National team caps and goals as of 5 October 2026

Jayden Onia Seke (born 8 May 2009) is a Belgian professional footballer who plays as a winger for RSCA Futures.

== Club career ==
Born in Brussels, Onia Seke is a youth product of KSC Grimbergen and Anderlecht.

On the summer 2024, he signed his first professional contract with Anderlecht.

Onia Seke made his professional debut with the reserve team in a 3–0 Challenger Pro League win over Deinze on 16 August 2024. At 15 years, 3 months and 8 days, he became the youngest ever professional player in Belgium surpassing previous record holder Jessi Da Silva, but also the likes of Nathan De Cat, Jesse Bisiwu and Konstantinos Karetsas.

During the following season, he cemented his position as a standout Challenger Pro League player, despite suffering a serious ankle injury mid-season, also starting to train with the Pro League first team.

== International career ==
Born in Belgium, Seke is of Ghanaian descent. He is a youth international for Belgium, having played for the under-15, under-16 and under-17.

He was selected with the under-17 team to play the European Under-17 Championship in May and June 2026. Belgium reached the final of the competition after beating Believe Munongo's French team 2–1, a first in the nation's history, after 4 semi-final exits, including twice against France.

== Career statistics ==
As of match played 25 October 2026

Appearances and goals by club, season and competition
Club	Season	League			Cup		Europe		Other		Total	
Club	Season	Division	Apps	Goals	Apps	Goals	Apps	Goals	Apps	Goals	Apps	Goals
RSCA Futures	2024–25	Challenger Pro League	12	0	—		—		4 (Note: Appearances in Premier League Cup)	0	16	0
RSCA Futures	2025–26	Challenger Pro League	21	1	—		—		2	0	23	1
RSCA Futures	2026–27	Challenger Pro League	1	0	—		—		—		1	0
RSCA Futures	Total		34	1	—		—		6	0	40	1
Anderlecht	2026–27	Belgian Pro League	1	0	0	0	5 (Note: Appearances in UEFA Europa League)	1	—		6	1
Career total			35	1	0	0	5	1	7	0	47	2

== Honours ==
Belgium U17

- UEFA European Under-17 Championship runner-up: 2026

Individual

- UEFA European Under-17 Championship Team of the Tournament: 2026
