= Xander Dierckx =

Belgian footballer (born 2009)

Personal information
- Date of birth: 27 February 2009 (age 17)
- Place of birth: Belgium
- Position: Midfielder

Team information
- Current team: Royal Antwerp F.C.
- Number: 78

Youth career
- –2024: Royal Antwerp F.C.

Senior career*
Years	Team	Apps	(Gls)
2025–	Young Reds	10	(1)
2025–	Royal Antwerp F.C.	19	(1)

International career
2025–	Belgium U17	5	(3)
Medal record
Men's football
Representing Belgium
UEFA European Under-17 Championship
Runner-up	2026 Estonia
- * Club domestic league appearances and goals as of 19 May 2026

Xander Dierckx (born 27 February 2009) is a Belgian footballer who plays as a midfielder for Belgian Pro League club Royal Antwerp F.C..

== Early life ==
Dierckx was born on 27 February 2009 in Belgium. Growing up, he played tennis.

== Club career ==
=== Antwerp ===
Dierckx came through the youth academy of Royal Antwerp F.C.. In May 2024, Dierckx signed his first pro contract. At 30 November 2025, he made his professional debut with Royal Antwerp F.C. against Club Brugge K.V.. He replaced Christopher Scott after 75 minutes in a 0-1 away win.

== Honours ==
Belgium U17

- UEFA European Under-17 Championship runner-up: 2026
