= France national under-17 football team =

National under-17 association football team representing France

France
- Nicknames: Les Bleuets (The Little Blues); Les Tricolores (The Tricolors)
- Association: French Football Federation
- Confederation: UEFA (Europe)
- Head coach: Sebastián Beccacece
- Captain: Luca Abril
- FIFA code: FRA
First colours	Second colours

Biggest defeat
- Germany 3–0 France (Ljubljana, Slovenia; 10 May 2012)

FIFA U-17 World Cup
- Appearances: 10 (first in 1987)
- Best result: Champions (2001)

UEFA European Under-17 Championship
- Appearances: 14 (first in 2002)
- Best result: Champions (2004, 2015, 2022)
Medal record
Men's football
FIFA U-17 World Cup
Gold medal – first place	2001 Trinidad & Tobago	Team
Silver medal – second place	2023 Indonesia	Team
Bronze medal – third place	2019 Brazil	Team
UEFA European U-17 Championship
Gold medal – first place	2004 France	Team
Gold medal – first place	2015 Bulgaria	Team
Gold medal – first place	2022 Israel	Team
Silver medal – second place	2002 Denmark	Team
Silver medal – second place	2008 Turkey	Team
Silver medal – second place	2023 Hungary	Team
Bronze medal – third place	2007 Belgium	Team
Bronze medal – third place	2010 Liechtenstein	Team
Bronze medal – third place	2019 Ireland	Team

The France national under-17 football team is the national under-17 football team of France who will be playing in the UEFA European Championship this year controlled by the French Football Federation. The team competes in the annual UEFA European Under-17 Championship and the FIFA U-17 World Cup, which is held every two years. The under-17 team also participates in local and international friendly tournaments, such as the Montaigu Tournament.

== Players ==
=== Current squad ===
The following players were named in the squad for the 2026 UEFA European Under-17 Championship, to be played 25 May – 7 June 2026.

No.	Pos.	Player	Date of birth (age)	Club
	GK	Axel Decrenisse	25 January 2009 (age 17)	(French Football Federation) Monaco (Note: Monaco is a Monégasque club playing in the French soccer league system.)
	GK	Thâo Mouapa Mwa Meuraillo	24 September 2009 (age 17)	(French Football Federation) Rennes
	DF	Mathis Chambon	18 January 2009 (age 17)	(French Football Federation) Montpellier
	DF	Mohamed Sylla	1 February 2009 (age 17)	(French Football Federation) Paris FC
	DF	Léo Lemaître	20 March 2009 (age 17)	(Royal Spanish Football Federation) Real Madrid
	DF	Maël Gernigon	1 October 2009 (age 17)	(French Football Federation) Angers
	DF	Yoann Becker	12 January 2009 (age 17)	(French Football Federation) Strasbourg
	DF	Jarell Paisley	30 January 2009 (age 17)	(French Football Federation) Paris Saint-Germain
	DF	David Boly	22 January 2009 (age 17)	(French Football Federation) Paris Saint-Germain
	MF	Kenan Doganay	22 January 2009 (age 17)	(French Football Federation) Lyon
	MF	Believe Munongo	23 November 2009 (age 16)	(French Football Federation) Metz
	MF	Yanis Addich	23 February 2009 (age 17)	(French Football Federation) Strasbourg
	MF	Noah Loufoundou	13 May 2009 (age 17)	(French Football Federation) Rennes
	FW	Aly Traoré	2 February 2009 (age 17)	(French Football Federation) Amiens
	FW	Loan Merrifield	29 March 2009 (age 17)	(French Football Federation) Nantes
	FW	Arone Gadou	19 January 2009 (age 17)	(French Football Federation) Reims
	FW	Joshua Dago	10 May 2009 (age 17)	(French Football Federation) Nantes
	FW	Aymen Amaaouch	30 September 2009 (age 17)	(French Football Federation) Toulouse
	FW	Noha Tiehi	30 June 2009 (age 17)	(French Football Federation) Paris Saint-Germain
	FW	Christ Batola	3 June 2009 (age 17)	(French Football Federation) Troyes

=== Recent call-ups ===
Pos.	Player	Date of birth (age)	Caps	Goals	Club	Latest call-up

== Previous squads ==
FIFA U-17 World Cup/Championship squads

- 2023 FIFA U-17 World Cup squads – France
- 2019 FIFA U-17 World Cup squads – France
- 2017 FIFA U-17 World Cup squads – France
- 2015 FIFA U-17 World Cup squads – France
- 2011 FIFA U-17 World Cup squads – France
- 2007 FIFA U-17 World Cup squads – France
- 2001 FIFA U-17 World Championship squads – France

UEFA European Under-17 Championship squads

- 2023 UEFA European Under-17 Championship squads – France
- 2022 UEFA European Under-17 Championship squads – France
- 2019 UEFA European Under-17 Championship squads – France
- 2017 UEFA European Under-17 Championship squads – France
- 2016 UEFA European Under-17 Championship squads – France
- 2015 UEFA European Under-17 Championship squads – France
- 2012 UEFA European Under-17 Championship squads – France
- 2011 UEFA European Under-17 Championship squads – France
- 2010 UEFA European Under-17 Championship squads – France
- 2009 UEFA European Under-17 Championship squads – France
- 2008 UEFA European Under-17 Championship squads – France
- 2007 UEFA European Under-17 Championship squads – France
- 2004 UEFA European Under-17 Championship squads – France
- 2002 UEFA European Under-17 Championship squads – France

== Competitive record ==
=== FIFA U-17 World Cup record ===
Year	Result	GP	W	D*	L	GS	GA
(China) 1985	did not qualify						
(Canada) 1987	Quarter-finals	4	1	1	2	6	6
(Scotland) 1989	did not qualify						
(Italy) 1991	did not qualify						
(Japan) 1993	did not qualify						
(Ecuador) 1995	did not qualify						
(Egypt) 1997	did not qualify						
(New Zealand) 1999	did not qualify						
(Trinidad and Tobago) 2001	Champions	6	5	0	1	18	8
(Finland) 2003	did not qualify						
(Peru) 2005	did not qualify						
(South Korea) 2007	Quarter-finals	5	2	2	1	8	6
(Nigeria) 2009	did not qualify						
(Mexico) 2011	Quarter-finals	5	2	2	1	9	6
(United Arab Emirates) 2013	did not qualify						
(Chile) 2015	Round of 16	4	3	1	0	14	4
(India) 2017	Round of 16	4	3	0	1	15	5
(Brazil) 2019	Third place	7	6	0	1	22	6
(Peru) ~~2021~~	Cancelled due to COVID-19 pandemic						
(Indonesia) 2023	Runners-up	7	5	2	0	12	3
(Qatar) 2025	Round of 16	5	2	2	1	5	2
(Qatar) 2026	In progress	1	1	0	0	3	1
(Qatar) 2027	To be determined						
(Qatar) 2028	To be determined						
(Qatar) 2029	To be determined						
Total:10/21	1 Title	48	30	10	8	112	47

=== UEFA U-17 European Championship record ===
Year	Result	GP	W	D*	L	GS	GA
(Denmark) 2002	Runners-up	6	1	4	1	5	4
(Portugal) 2003	did not qualify						
(France) 2004	Champions	5	5	0	0	11	3
(Italy) 2005	did not qualify						
(Luxembourg) 2006	did not qualify						
(Belgium) 2007	Semi-finals	4	1	1	2	4	6
(Turkey) 2008	Runners-up	5	2	2	1	8	9
(Germany) 2009	Group stage	3	0	2	1	2	3
(Liechtenstein) 2010	Semi-finals	4	2	0	2	6	5
(Serbia) 2011	Group stage	3	0	2	1	3	4
(Slovenia) 2012	Group stage	3	0	2	1	3	6
(Slovakia) 2013	did not qualify						
(Malta) 2014	did not qualify						
(Bulgaria) 2015	Champions	6	5	1	0	15	2
(Azerbaijan) 2016	Group stage	3	0	1	2	0	3
(Croatia) 2017	Fifth place	5	3	0	2	13	7
(England) 2018	did not qualify						
(Republic of Ireland) 2019	Semi-finals	5	3	1	1	14	6
(Estonia) ~~2020~~	Cancelled due to COVID-19 pandemic						
(Cyprus) ~~2021~~	Cancelled due to COVID-19 pandemic						
(Israel) 2022	Champions	6	4	1	1	16	8
(Hungary) 2023	Runners-up	6	3	2	1	9	6
(Cyprus) 2024	Group stage	3	2	0	1	3	5
(Albania) 2025	Runners-up	5	3	1	1	10	5
(Estonia) 2026	Semi-finals	4	2	0	2	10	3
(Latvia) 2027	To be determined						
(Lithuania) 2028	To be determined						
(Moldova) 2029	To be determined						
Total:17/23	3 Titles	76	36	20	20	132	85

*Draws include knockout matches decided by penalty shoot-out.
**Gold background colour indicates that the tournament was won. Red border colour indicates tournament was held on home soil.
***Red border colour indicates tournament was held on home soil.

== Head-to-head record ==
The following table shows France's head-to-head record in the FIFA U-17 World Cup.

Opponent	Pld	W	D	L	GF	GA	GD	Win %
Argentina	2	2	0	0	5	1	+4	100.00
Australia	2	2	0	0	8	1	+7	100.00
Brazil	3	1	1	1	4	4	+0	33.33
Burkina Faso	1	1	0	0	3	0	+3	100.00
Chile	1	1	0	0	2	0	+2	100.00
Costa Rica	1	0	1	0	0	0	+0	0.00
Germany	1	0	1	0	2	2	+0	0.00
Haiti	2	1	1	0	3	1	+2	50.00
Honduras	1	1	0	0	5	1	+4	100.00
Ivory Coast	1	1	0	0	3	2	+1	100.00
Jamaica	1	0	1	0	1	1	+0	0.00
Japan	4	3	1	0	10	4	+6	75.00
Mali	1	1	0	0	2	1	+1	100.00
Mexico	1	0	0	1	1	2	−1	0.00
Netherlands	1	1	0	0	3	1	+2	100.00
New Caledonia	1	1	0	0	7	1	+6	100.00
New Zealand	1	1	0	0	6	1	+5	100.00
Nigeria	3	1	0	2	5	4	+1	33.33
Paraguay	1	1	0	0	4	3	+1	100.00
Saudi Arabia	1	0	0	1	0	2	−2	0.00
Senegal	1	0	1	0	0	0	+0	0.00
South Korea	2	2	0	0	4	1	+3	100.00
Soviet Union	1	0	0	1	2	3	−1	0.00
Spain	3	1	1	1	8	4	+4	33.33
Syria	1	1	0	0	4	0	+4	100.00
Tunisia	1	1	0	0	3	1	+2	100.00
United States	2	2	0	0	8	3	+5	100.00
Uzbekistan	1	1	0	0	1	0	+1	100.00
Total	42	27	8	7	104	44	+60	64.29

== Honours ==
- FIFA Under-17 World Cup

Champions (1): 2001
Runners-up (1): 2023
Third place (1): 2019

- UEFA European Under-17 Championship

Champions (3): 2004, 2015, 2022
Runners-up (5): 1996, 2001, 2002, 2008, 2023

- Montaigu Tournament

Champions (9): 1976, 1977, 1983, 1996, 1997, 1998, 2001, 2005, 2006
