= Ebrima Tunkara =

Spanish footballer (born 2010)

Personal information
- Full name: Ebrima Tunkara Yataberreh
- Date of birth: 10 March 2010 (age 16)
- Place of birth: Lamoi, The Gambia
- Height: 1.78 m (5 ft 10 in)
- Position: Attacking midfielder

Team information
- Current team: Barcelona B
- Number: 10

Youth career
- 2017–2018: AEiLL Cerdanyola Mataró
- 2018–2026: Barcelona

Senior career*
| Years | Team | Apps | (Gls) |
| 2026– | Barcelona B | 5 | (0) |

International career^{‡}
| 2023–2024 | Spain U15 | 9 | (3) |
| 2024 | Spain U16 | 3 | (1) |
| 2025– | Spain U17 | 5 | (3) |
- * Club domestic league appearances and goals as of 11:18, 13 June 2026 (UTC) ‡ National team caps and goals as of 01:49, 13 May 2025 (UTC)

Ebrima Tunkara Yataberreh (born 10 March 2010) is a professional footballer who plays as an attacking midfielder for Segunda Federación club Barcelona Atlètic. Born in The Gambia, he is a youth international for Spain.

== Club career ==
Born in The Gambia, Tunkara's father moved to Mataró in 2007, and was able to bring his family with him in 2017. Tunkara immediately joined the youth academy of AEiLL Cerdanyola Mataró shortly after arriving, and was scouted by FC Barcelona shortly after. In 2018, he was integrated to Barcelona's youth academy, and in 2021 he moved to La Masia to finish his development. As a youth, he was undefeated in 30 games at benjamin level, and 30 games with the infantiles.

== International career ==
Born in The Gambia, Tunkara moved to Spain at a young age and has dual-citizenship. In September 2023, he was called up to the Spain U15s for a friendly tournament. In March 2025, he was called up to the Spain U16s for a development tournament for April. Ebrima Tunkara was one of the standout figures in the recent Spain-Andorra 3–0. In that match, the young culer scored two goals and provided an assist, directly contributing to all three goals for the national team.

== Honours ==
Individual

- UEFA European Under-17 Championship Player of the Tournament: 2026
- UEFA European Under-17 Championship Team of the Tournament: 2026
