= Spain national under-15 football team =

Youth association football team representing Spain

Spain Under-15
- Nickname: La Rojita (The Little Red One)
- Association: Real Federación Española de Fútbol
- Confederation: UEFA (Europe)
- Head coach: David Gordo
- FIFA code: ESP
First colours	Second colours

First international
- Austria 1–3 Spain (Messina, Italy; 29 May 1989)

Biggest win
- Spain 4–1 Costa Rica (Mexico City, Mexico; 23 June 2012)

Biggest defeat
- Spain 0–2 Poland (Lugo, Spain; 7 April 2002)

The Spain national under-15 football team is the national team that represents Spain and the Royal Spanish Football Federation under this age level. It is currently the youngest feeder for the national team and competes in such tournaments as the Under-15 Mexican Nations Cup, a competition that is seen as an attempt in creating an Under-15 FIFA World Cup in the near future.

As FIFA plan in making a World Cup tournament for players under the age of 15 soon, the Spain national team returned from a five-year hiatus (the last time the team played was in 2007 when they were crowned champions in the Torneo Villa de Santiago del Teide for the fifth consecutive time) to participate in a tournament that was hosted by Mexico in June 2012, the Mexican Nations Cup.

== Competitive record ==
=== Youth Olympic Games ===
Youth Olympic Games record
Year	Round	Position	Pld	W	D	L	GF	GA
(Singapore) 2010	did not enter
(China) 2014	did not enter
(Argentina) 2018	to be determined
Total	0/1	-	-	-	-	-	-	-

=== Under-15 Mexican Nations Cup ===
FIFA World Cup Record
Year	Round	Position	Pld	W	D	L	GF	GA
(Mexico) 2012	Third place	3rd	4	3	1	0	9	4
(Mexico) 2013	did not enter
Total	1/2	Semi-finals	4	3	1	0	9	4

=== Torneo Villa de Santiago del Teide ===
Year	Result	Position	GP	W	D*	L	GS	GA
(Spain) 2001	Champions	1st	2	2	0	0	4	2
(Spain) (Portugal) 2002	Runners-up	2nd	2	0	1	1	2	2
(Spain) 2003	Champions	1st	2	2	0	0	5	1
(Spain) 2004	Champions	1st	2	1	1	0	2	1
(Spain) 2005	Champions	1st	2	2	0	0	3	0
(Spain) (Portugal) 2006	Champions	1st	2	2	0	0	5	0
(Spain) (Portugal) 2007	Champions	1st	2	2	0	0	10	0
Total	7/7	5 titles	14	11	2	1	31	6

== Honours ==
Under-15 Mexican Nations Cup

- Semi-Finals (1): 2012

Torneo Villa de Santiago del Teide

- Winners (6): 2001, 2003, 2004, 2005, 2006, 2007
- Runners-up (1): 2002

== See also ==
- Spain national football team
- Spain Olympic football team
- Spain national under-21 football team
- Spain national under-20 football team
- Spain national under-19 football team
- Spain national under-18 football team
- Spain national under-17 football team
- Spain national under-16 football team
