= Belgium national under-17 football team =

National association football team

Belgium U-17
- Nickname(s): De Jonge Duivels; Les Diablotins; The Super Devils "Brussel Sprouts"
- Association: Royal Belgian Football Association
- Confederation: UEFA
- Head coach: Sven Vermant
- FIFA code: BEL
First colours	Second colours

World Cup
- Appearances: 4 (first in 2007)
- Best result: (bronze) 3rd (2015)

European Championship
- Appearances: 8 (first in 2006)
- Best result: (silver) 2nd (2026)
Medal record
Men's football
FIFA U-17 World Cup
Bronze medal – third place	2015 Chile	Team
UEFA U-17 European Championship
Silver medal – second place	2026 Estonia	Team
Bronze medal – third place	2007 Belgium	Team
Bronze medal – third place	2015 Bulgaria	Team
Bronze medal – third place	2018 England	Team
Bronze medal – third place	2025 Albania	Team

The Belgium national under-17 football team is the national under-17 football team of Belgium and is controlled by the Belgian Football Association. The team competes in the UEFA European Under-17 Championship and the FIFA U-17 World Cup. Their biggest successes have been their bronze medal at the 2015 World Cup and reaching the final of the European championship in 2026.

== Players ==
=== Current squad ===
The following players were called up for the 2026 UEFA European Under-17 Championship, to be played between 25 May – 7 June 2026.

No.	Pos.	Player	Date of birth (age)	Club
	GK	Esteban Levaux	29 December 2009 (age 16)	(Royal Belgian Football Association) Standard Liège
1	GK	Mattis Seghers	19 January 2009 (age 17)	(Royal Belgian Football Association) Anderlecht
12	GK	Lowie Piselé	17 September 2009 (age 17)	(Royal Belgian Football Association) Antwerp
	DF	Elie Mbavu	20 October 2009 (age 17)	(Royal Belgian Football Association) Genk
4	DF	Preben Blondeel (captain)	7 January 2009 (age 17)	(Royal Belgian Football Association) Gent
3	DF	Léni Strouwen	24 August 2009 (age 17)	(Royal Belgian Football Association) Club Brugge
5	DF	Assil Saidi	10 June 2009 (age 17)	(Royal Belgian Football Association) Genk
20	DF	Rayan Garcia Belkacem	29 September 2009 (age 17)	(Royal Belgian Football Association) Gent
2	DF	Sami El Morabet	19 May 2009 (age 17)	(Royal Belgian Football Association) Genk
17	MF	Noah Kalonji	22 April 2009 (age 17)	(Royal Belgian Football Association) Anderlecht
8	MF	Xander Dierckx	27 February 2009 (age 17)	(Royal Belgian Football Association) Antwerp
6	MF	Louie Van Gelder	30 January 2009 (age 17)	(Royal Belgian Football Association) Antwerp
14	MF	Tinus Moorthamer	6 October 2009 (age 17)	(Royal Belgian Football Association) Antwerp
16	MF	Rune Verstrepen	20 February 2009 (age 17)	(Royal Belgian Football Association) Anderlecht
10	MF	Jelle Driessen	19 January 2009 (age 17)	(Royal Belgian Football Association) Genk
9	MF	Ilyas Benktib	23 January 2009 (age 17)	(Royal Belgian Football Association) Anderlecht
18	FW	Gabriel Biladi	16 May 2009 (age 17)	(Royal Belgian Football Association) Anderlecht
	FW	Joshua Nga Kana	13 June 2009 (age 17)	(Royal Belgian Football Association) Anderlecht
7	FW	Jayden Onia Seke	8 May 2009 (age 17)	(Royal Belgian Football Association) Anderlecht
11	FW	Kiyan Achahbar	30 June 2009 (age 17)	(Royal Belgian Football Association) Genk
	FW	Yhanis Onehese	25 June 2009 (age 17)	(Royal Belgian Football Association) Standard Liège

=== Recent call-ups ===
The following players have also been called up to the Belgium under-17 squad within the last twelve months and remain eligible for selection.

Pos.	Player	Date of birth (age)	Caps	Goals	Club	Latest call-up

== Competitive record ==
=== FIFA U-17 World Cup record ===
Year	Round	Pld	W	D	L	GF	GA
(China) 1985	did not qualify						
(Canada) 1987	did not qualify						
(Scotland) 1989	did not qualify						
(Italy) 1991	did not qualify						
(Japan) 1993	did not qualify						
(Ecuador) 1995	did not qualify						
(Egypt) 1997	did not qualify						
(New Zealand) 1999	did not qualify						
(Trinidad and Tobago) 2001	did not qualify						
(Finland) 2003	did not qualify						
(Peru) 2005	did not qualify						
(South Korea) 2007	Group stage	3	1	0	2	3	6
(Nigeria) 2009	did not qualify						
(Mexico) 2011	did not qualify						
(United Arab Emirates) 2013	did not qualify						
(Chile) 2015	Third place	7	4	1	2	9	8
(India) 2017	did not qualify						
(Brazil) 2019	did not qualify						
(Indonesia) 2023	did not qualify						
(Qatar) 2025	Round of 32	4	2	1	1	12	5
(Qatar) 2026	In progress	1	1	0	0	3	2
(Qatar) 2027	To be determined						
(Qatar) 2028	To be determined						
(Qatar) 2029	To be determined						
Total:4/21	Third place	12	6	1	5	16	18

=== UEFA European U-17 Football Championship record ===
Year	Round	Pld	W	D*	L	GF	GA
(Denmark) 2002	did not qualify						
(Portugal) 2003	did not qualify						
(France) 2004	did not qualify						
(Italy) 2005	did not qualify						
(Luxembourg) 2006	Group stage	3	0	1	2	2	8
(Belgium) 2007	Semi-finals	4	1	3*	0	5	5
(Turkey) 2008	did not qualify						
(Germany) 2009	did not qualify						
(Liechtenstein) 2010	did not qualify						
(Serbia) 2011	did not qualify						
(Slovenia) 2012	Group stage	3	1	1	1	3	2
(Slovakia) 2013	did not qualify						
(Malta) 2014	did not qualify						
(Bulgaria) 2015	Semi-finals	5	2	2*	1	6	4
(Azerbaijan) 2016	Quarter-finals	4	1	2	1	3	2
(Croatia) 2017	did not qualify						
(England) 2018	Semi-finals	5	4	0	1	10	3
(Republic of Ireland) 2019	Quarter-finals	4	1	2	1	5	5
(Estonia) 2020	Cancelled due to COVID-19 pandemic						
(Cyprus) 2021	Cancelled due to COVID-19 pandemic						
(Israel) 2022	Group stage	3	1	1	1	4	4
(Hungary) 2023	did not qualify						
(Cyprus) 2024	did not qualify						
(Albania) 2025	Semi-finals	4	1	1	2	7	7
(Estonia) 2026	Runners-up	5	3	1	1	6	3
(Latvia) 2027	To be determined						
(Lithuania) 2028	To be determined						
(Moldova) 2029	To be determined						
Total:9/10	Runners-up	40	16	12	12	51	43

- * denotes draws include knockout matches decided on penalty kicks.
- indicates tournament was held on home soil.

2

== Head-to-head record ==
The following table shows Belgium's head-to-head record in the FIFA U-17 World Cup.

Opponent	Pld	W	D	L	GF	GA	GD	Win %
Costa Rica	1	1	0	0	1	0	+1	100.00
Ecuador	1	0	0	1	0	2	−2	0.00
Honduras	1	1	0	0	2	1	+1	100.00
Mali	2	0	1	1	1	3	−2	0.00
Mexico	1	1	0	0	3	2	+1	100.00
South Korea	1	1	0	0	2	0	+2	100.00
Tajikistan	1	1	0	0	1	0	+1	100.00
Tunisia	1	0	0	1	2	4	−2	0.00
United States	1	0	0	1	0	2	−2	0.00
Total	10	5	1	4	12	14	−2	50.00

== See also ==
- Belgium national football team
- Belgium national under-21 football team
- Belgium national under-19 football team
