= 2006 UEFA European Under-17 Championship squads =

Football tournament squads

Below are the rosters for the 2006 UEFA European Under-17 Championship held in Luxembourg.

== Belgium ==
Coach: Eric Abrams (Belgium)

#	Name	Pos	Club
1	Tom Vandenbossche	GK	Club Brugge (Belgium)
2	Enrico Pellegriti	DF	Genk (Belgium)
3	Toby Alderweireld	DF	Ajax (Netherlands)
4	Cor Gillis	DF	Anderlecht (Belgium)
5	Jeremy Huyghebaert	DF	Mouscron (Belgium)
6	Axel Witsel	MF	Standard Liège (Belgium)
7	Cedric Baes	FW	Genk (Belgium)
8	Siegerd Degeling	MF	Feyenoord (Netherlands)
9	Dieter Wittesaele	FW	Cercle Brugge (Belgium)
10	Gael Arend	MF	Standard Liège (Belgium)
11	Livio D'Amires	FW	Genk (Belgium)
12	Cyprien Baguette	GK	Charleroi (Belgium)
13	Dwayne Dildick	DF	Club Brugge (Belgium)
14	Robbe Van Ruyskensvelde	DF	Club Brugge (Belgium)
15	Niels De Loof	MF	Club Brugge (Belgium)
16	Mehdi Carcela	FW	Standard Liège (Belgium)
17	Maurizio Aquino	FW	Genk (Belgium)
18	Jens Van Damme	FW	Cercle Brugge (Belgium)

== Czech Republic ==
Coach: Jakub Dovalil (Czech Republic)

#	Name	Pos	Club
1	Marek Štěch	GK	Sparta Prague (Czech Republic)
2	Ondřej Mazuch	DF	Brno (Czech Republic)
3	Jan Polák	DF	Slovan Liberec (Czech Republic)
4	Martin Zeman	MF	Sparta Prague (Czech Republic)
5	Jan Hable	MF	Hradec Králové (Czech Republic)
6	Lukáš Vácha	DF	Slavia Prague (Czech Republic)
7	Jan Vošahlík	FW	Marila Příbram (Czech Republic)
8	Ivan Lacko	MF	Brno (Czech Republic)
9	Martin Holek	MF	Slovácko (Czech Republic)
10	Tomáš Necid	FW	Slavia Prague (Czech Republic)
11	Tomáš Pekhart	FW	Tottenham Hotspur (England)
12	Petr Reinberk	MF	Slovácko (Czech Republic)
13	Miroslav Štěpánek	DF	Sigma Olomouc (Czech Republic)
14	Radim Řezník	DF	Baník Ostrava (Czech Republic)
15	Jakub Heidenheimer	DF	Sigma Olomouc (Czech Republic)
16	Ondřej Volšík	GK	Hradec Králové (Czech Republic)
17	Petr Wojnar	MF	Baník Ostrava (Czech Republic)
18	Jakub Süsser	DF	Chmel Blšany (Czech Republic)

== Germany ==
Coach: Bernd Stöber (Germany)

#	Name	Pos	Club
1	Ron-Robert Zieler	GK	Manchester United (England)
2	Björn Kopplin	DF	Bayern Munich (Germany)
3	David Vrzogic	DF	Borussia Dortmund (Germany)
4	Christopher Schorch	DF	Hertha BSC (Germany)
5	Florian Jungwirth	DF	1860 Munich (Germany)
6	Sven Bender	MF	1860 Munich (Germany)
7	Marko Marin	MF	Borussia Mönchengladbach (Germany)
8	Lars Bender	MF	1860 Munich (Germany)
9	Manuel Fischer	FW	VfB Stuttgart (Germany)
10	Toni Kroos	MF	Hansa Rostock (Germany)
11	Timo Gebhart	FW	1860 Munich (Germany)
12	Sascha Burchert	GK	Hertha BSC (Germany)
13	Stefan Reinartz	DF	Bayer Leverkusen (Germany)
14	Mathias Wittek	DF	1860 Munich (Germany)
15	Danny Latza	MF	Schalke 04 (Germany)
16	Mario Vrančić	MF	Mainz 05 (Germany)
17	Sebastian Huke	FW	Hertha BSC (Germany)
18	Raphael Lorenz	FW	Borussia Dortmund (Germany)

== Hungary ==
Coach: József Both (Hungary)

#	Name	Pos	Club
1	Milán Balikó	GK	MTK Budapest (Hungary)
2	Attila Busai	DF	MTK Budapest (Hungary)
3	Ádám Simon	MF	MTK Budapest (Hungary)
4	András Gál	DF	MTK Budapest (Hungary)
5	András Debreceni	DF	Budapest Honvéd (Hungary)
6	Gergő Rása	MF	MTK Budapest (Hungary)
7	Vladimir Koman	MF	Sampdoria (Italy)
8	Ádám Dudás	FW	Győri ETO (Hungary)
9	Krisztián Németh	FW	MTK Budapest (Hungary)
10	Márk Nikházi	FW	MTK Budapest (Hungary)
11	Péter Tóth	FW	Újpest (Hungary)
12	Péter Gulácsi	GK	MTK Budapest (Hungary)
13	Adrián Szekeres	DF	MTK Budapest (Hungary)
14	Ádám Présinger	DF	MTK Budapest (Hungary)
15	Tamás Nagy	MF	MTK Budapest (Hungary)
16	András Simon	FW	MTK Budapest (Hungary)
17	László Szabó	FW	MTK Budapest (Hungary)
18	Dániel Lengyel	DF	MTK Budapest (Hungary)

== Luxembourg ==
Coach: Ronny Bonvini (Luxembourg)

#	Name	Pos	Club
1	Fabiano Castellani	GK	Rumelange (Luxembourg)
2	Massimo Martino	DF	Racing Luxembourg
3	Christophe Scholer	DF	Racing Luxembourg
4	Michel Kettenmeyer	DF	Villerupt (France)
5	Jérôme Marcolino	DF	Käerjeng 97 (Luxembourg)
6	Lars Gerson	MF	—
7	Pit Hilbert	FW	AS Pratzerthal/Rédange (Luxembourg)
8	Gilles Bettmer	MF	SC Freiburg (Germany)
9	Miralem Pjanić	MF	Metz (France)
10	Matthew De Cae	MF	Kehlen (Luxembourg)
11	Richard Jankowoy	FW	Mensdorf (Luxembourg)
12	André Bill	GK	Käerjeng 97 (Luxembourg)
13	Mirko Albanese	FW	Differdange (Luxembourg)
14	Ricardo Thom	MF	Mondercange (Luxembourg)
15	Mato Djuric	FW	Racing Luxembourg
16	Mathias Jänisch	MF	Hostert (Luxembourg)
17	Paul Bossi	MF	Progrès Niedercorn (Luxembourg)
18	Tom Siebenaler	DF	Remerschen (Luxembourg)

== Russia ==
Coach: Igor Kolyvanov (Russia)

#	Name	Pos	Club
1	Roman Savenkov	GK	FC Krylia Sovetov-SOK Dimitrovgrad (Russia)
2	Sergei Morozov	DF	Torpedo Moscow (Russia)
3	Artyom Samsonov	DF	Torpedo Moscow (Russia)
4	Aleksandr Sapeta	MF	Saturn Ramenskoe (Russia)
5	Anton Vlasov	DF	FC Krylia Sovetov-SOK Dimitrovgrad (Russia)
6	Vadim Gagloyev	MF	CSKA Moscow (Russia)
7	Yevgeni Korotayev	FW	FC Krylia Sovetov-SOK Dimitrovgrad (Russia)
8	Semyon Fomin	MF	Lokomotiv Moscow (Russia)
9	Aleksandr Prudnikov	FW	Spartak Moscow (Russia)
10	Igor Gorbatenko	MF	FC Krylia Sovetov-SOK Dimitrovgrad (Russia)
11	Yan Bobrovsky	MF	Zenit Saint Petersburg (Russia)
12	Yevgeny Pomazan	GK	Kuban Krasnodar (Russia)
13	Dmitri Ryzhov	FW	FC Krylia Sovetov-SOK Dimitrovgrad (Russia)
14	Pavel Mochalin	MF	Zenit Saint Petersburg (Russia)
15	Roman Amirkhanov	DF	Lokomotiv Moscow (Russia)
16	Amir Kashiyev	MF	CSKA Moscow (Russia)
17	Denis Shcherbak	MF	FC Krylia Sovetov-SOK Dimitrovgrad (Russia)
18	Aleksandr Marenich	FW	Rostov (Russia)

== Serbia and Montenegro ==
Coach: Saša Medin (Serbia and Montenegro)

#	Name	Pos	Club
1	Marko Knežević	GK	—
2	Dušan Brković	DF	—
3	Rajko Brežančić	DF	—
4	Saša Blagojević	DF	—
5	Miloš Nikolić	MF	—
6	Nikola Gulan	MF	Partizan (Serbia and Montenegro)
7	Zarija Peličić	MF	—
8	Stevan Jovetić	FW	Partizan (Serbia and Montenegro)
9	Nenad Adamović	MF	Partizan (Serbia and Montenegro)
10	Igor Miladinović	MF	—
11	Veljko Vuković	MF	—
12	Živko Živković	GK	—
13	Goran Četnik	DF	—
14	Marko Nikolić	MF	—
15	Slavko Lukić	DF	—
16	Slavko Perović	FW	—
17	Darko Karadžić	MF	—
18	Vlado Peličić	DF	—

== Spain ==
Coach: Juan Santisteban (Spain)

#	Name	Pos	Club
1	Sergio Asenjo	GK	Real Valladolid (Spain)
2	Manuel Castellano	DF	Valencia (Spain)
3	Ramón Soria	DF	Villarreal (Spain)
4	Roberto García	DF	Atlético Madrid (Spain)
5	Pedro Alcalá	DF	Málaga (Spain)
6	Ignacio Camacho	MF	Atlético Madrid (Spain)
7	César Azpilicueta	DF	Osasuna (Spain)
8	Marcos Gullón	MF	Villarreal (Spain)
9	Emilio Nsue	FW	Mallorca (Spain)
10	Aarón Ñíguez	FW	Valencia (Spain)
11	Cristian Vergara	MF	Barcelona (Spain)
12	César Ortiz	DF	Atlético Madrid (Spain)
13	Jesús Coca	GK	Atlético Madrid (Spain)
14	Rubén Ramos	FW	Atlético Madrid (Spain)
15	Guillem Savall	DF	RCD Espanyol (Spain)
16	Bojan Krkić	FW	Barcelona (Spain)
17	Raúl Baena	MF	Barcelona (Spain)
18	José Hermosa	MF	Villarreal (Spain)
