= List of Belgian football transfers winter 2008–09 =

This is a list of Belgian football transfers for the 2008–09 winter transfer window. Only transfers involving a team from the Jupiler League are listed.

The winter transfer window opened on 1 January 2009, although a few transfers may have taken place prior to that date. The window closed at midnight on 31 January 2009.

== Sorted by date ==
=== October 2008 ===
Date	Name	Moving from	Moving to	Fee
21 October 2008	Tom De Sutter	Cercle Brugge	Anderlecht	Undisclosed

=== November 2008 ===
Date	Name	Moving from	Moving to	Fee
24 November 2008	(Mali) Mamoutou N'Diaye	(Mali) Jeanne D'Arc Bamako	Gent	Undisclosed

=== December 2008 ===
Date	Name	Moving from	Moving to	Fee
2 December 2008	(Morocco) Mohamed Armoumen	Lokeren	(Morocco) Raja Casablanca	Undisclosed
5 December 2008	Bart Goor	Anderlecht	Germinal Beerschot	Undisclosed
8 December 2008	Stef Wils	Westerlo	Gent	Undisclosed
9 December 2008	Tim Smolders	Charleroi	Gent	Undisclosed
11 December 2008	Pieter Mbemba	Mechelen	(Netherlands) FC Eindhoven	Loan
13 December 2008	(Brazil) Kanu	Anderlecht	Cercle Brugge	Loan
16 December 2008	(Honduras) Víctor Bernárdez	(Honduras) Motagua	Anderlecht	Loan
16 December 2008	(Cameroon) Ernest Nfor	Gent	Zulte Waregem	Loan
18 December 2008	Michaël Cordier	Brussels	Anderlecht	Undisclosed
18 December 2008	(Mali) Kassim Doumbia	(Mali) AS Korofina	Gent	Undisclosed
20 December 2008	(Bosnia and Herzegovina) Adnan Čustović	Mouscron	Gent	Undisclosed
20 December 2008	Tim Matthys	Zulte Waregem	(Greece) Panthrakikos	Loan
20 December 2008	Roy Meeus	Club Brugge	Dender	Loan
20 December 2008	Robbe Van Ruyskensvelde	Club Brugge	Dender	Loan
20 December 2008	(Netherlands) Niels Vorthoren	(Netherlands) Willem II	Roeselare	Loan
22 December 2008	Logan Bailly	Genk	(Germany) Borussia Mönchengladbach	Undisclosed
22 December 2008	Wim Mennes	Westerlo	Sint-Truiden	Undisclosed
23 December 2008	(Serbia) Aleksandar Mutavdžić	Gent	(Greece) Panserraikos	Undisclosed
24 December 2008	(Brazil) Dante	Standard Liège	(Germany) Borussia Mönchengladbach	Undisclosed
29 December 2008	Sinan Bolat	Genk	Standard Liège	€ 150.000
30 December 2008	(Ghana) Gideon Boateng	Anderlecht	(Netherlands) MVV	Undisclosed
31 December 2008	Massimo Moia	Gent	Charleroi	Undisclosed

=== January 2009 ===
Date	Name	Moving from	Moving to	Fee
1 January 2009	Mark De Man	(Netherlands) Roda JC	Germinal Beerschot	Undisclosed
2 January 2009	Christian Benteke	Genk	Standard Liège	€ 150.000
2 January 2009	Wouter Degroote	Dender EH	Eendracht Aalst	Undisclosed
2 January 2009	Jérémy Huyghebaert	(France) Auxerre	Roeselare	Loan
2 January 2009	(Croatia) Ivan Perišić	(France) Sochaux	Roeselare	Loan
2 January 2009	(France) Jérémy Taravel	(France) Lille	Zulte Waregem	Loan
2 January 2009	(Netherlands) Arturo ten Heuvel	Free agent	Roeselare	N/A
3 January 2009	(Montenegro) Predrag Filipović	Dender EH	Eendracht Aalst	Undisclosed
3 January 2009	(Poland) Dawid Janczyk	(Russia) CSKA Moscow	Lokeren	Loan
4 January 2009	(Ivory Coast) Charles Banga	Olympic Charleroi	Dender EH	Undisclosed
4 January 2009	(France) Rudy Saintini	Olympic Charleroi	Dender EH	Undisclosed
5 January 2009	Mustapha Oussalah	Mouscron	Kortrijk	Undisclosed
6 January 2009	Sem Franssen	Tongeren	Genk	Undisclosed
6 January 2009	(Cameroon) Arnaud Sutchuin	Anderlecht	(Netherlands) Roda JC	Undisclosed
7 January 2009	(Democratic Republic of the Congo) Patiyo Tambwe	Lokeren	(Turkey) Hacettepe	Undisclosed
9 January 2009	(Bosnia and Herzegovina) Admir Aganović	(Serbia) Čukarički Belgrade	Dender EH	Undisclosed
9 January 2009	(Netherlands) Harrie Gommans	(Netherlands) Roda JC	Roeselare	Loan
9 January 2009	Niels Houman	Anderlecht	OH Leuven	Undisclosed
9 January 2009	(Germany) Marc-André Kruska	(Germany) Borussia Dortmund	Club Brugge	€ 500.000
9 January 2009	(Serbia) Mladen Lazarević	(Serbia) Partizan Belgrade	Roeselare	Loan
9 January 2009	(Netherlands) Sherjill MacDonald	(England) West Bromwich Albion	Roeselare	Loan
9 January 2009	(North Macedonia) Igor Mitreski	(Germany) FC Energie Cottbus	Germinal Beerschot	Loan
9 January 2009	Vadis Odjidja-Ofoe	(Germany) Hamburger SV	Club Brugge	€ 900.000
14 January 2009	(Serbia) Dušan Đokić	Club Brugge	(Cyprus) Omonia Nicosia	Loan
14 January 2009	(Turkey) Mehmet Kiskaç	(Turkey) Ankaragücü	Standard Liège	Undisclosed
15 January 2009	Tom De Mul	(Spain) Sevilla	Genk	Loan
15 January 2009	(Croatia) Ivan Leko	Club Brugge	Germinal Beerschot	Undisclosed
16 January 2009	(Argentina) Juan Amieva	(Argentina) Defensores de Belgrano	Lokeren	Undisclosed
16 January 2009	(Norway) Erlend Hanstveit	(Norway) Brann Bergen	Gent	Undisclosed
16 January 2009	Stein Huysegems	(Netherlands) Twente	Genk	Undisclosed
22 January 2009	Kris De Wree	Germinal Beerschot	(Netherlands) Roda JC	Undisclosed
23 January 2009	Davy De Beule	Gent	Kortrijk	Undisclosed
27 January 2009	(Republic of Ireland) Dominic Foley	Gent	Cercle Brugge	Undisclosed
27 January 2009	Cor Gillis	Anderlecht	Mechelen	Undisclosed
29 January 2009	(Algeria) Mohamed Dahmane	Mons	Club Brugge	Undisclosed
29 January 2009	(Algeria) Adlène Guedioura	Kortrijk	Charleroi	Undisclosed
29 January 2009	(Democratic Republic of the Congo) Jean-Paul Kielo-Lezi	Mechelen	Brussels	Loan
29 January 2009	(Israel) Yoav Ziv	(Israel) Beitar Jerusalem	Lokeren	Undisclosed
30 January 2009	(Morocco) Abdessalam Benjelloun	Charleroi	Roeselare	Undisclosed
30 January 2009	(Ivory Coast) Zoro Cyriac Gohi Bi	(Ivory Coast) ASEC Mimosas	Standard Liège	Undisclosed
30 January 2009	Christophe Grégoire	(Netherlands) Willem II	Charleroi	Loan
30 January 2009	(Germany) Torben Joneleit	(France) AS Monaco	Charleroi	Loan
31 January 2009	(Bosnia and Herzegovina) Jusuf Dajić	(South Korea) Jeonbuk Hyundai Motors	Tubize	Undisclosed
31 January 2009	Jérémy De Vriendt	Standard Liège	Mechelen	Undisclosed
31 January 2009	(Slovenia) Dejan Kelhar	(Slovenia) NK Celje	Cercle Brugge	Undisclosed
31 January 2009	(Poland) Błażej Radler	(Poland) Odra Wodzisław	Tubize	Undisclosed

=== February 2009 ===
Date	Name	Moving from	Moving to	Fee
1 February 2009	(South Africa) Quinton Fortune	(Italy) Brescia	Tubize	Loan
1 February 2009	(Trinidad and Tobago) Khaleem Hyland	(England) Portsmouth	Zulte Waregem	Loan
1 February 2009	(Senegal) Mbaye Leye	Zulte Waregem	Gent	Undisclosed
1 February 2009	(Finland) Eetu Muinonen	(Finland) MyPa	Zulte Waregem	Undisclosed
1 February 2009	(Estonia) Tarmo Neemelo	(Finland) MyPa	Zulte Waregem	Undisclosed
2 February 2009	(France) Cédric Bétrémieux	Roeselare	Kortrijk	Undisclosed
2 February 2009	Wim De Decker	Genk	Germinal Beerschot	Traded for Ederson
2 February 2009	(France) Kamulete Makiese	(France) Lille	Zulte Waregem	Loan
2 February 2009	(Brazil) Ederson Tormena	Germinal Beerschot	Genk	Traded for De Decker

== Sorted by team ==
=== Anderlecht ===
In: Note: Flags indicate national team as defined under FIFA eligibility rules; some limited exceptions apply. Players may hold more than one non-FIFA nationality.

No.	Pos.	Nation	Player
21	FW	BEL	Tom De Sutter (from Cercle Brugge)
26	DF	HON	Víctor Bernárdez (on loan from Motagua)
28	GK	BEL	Michaël Cordier (from Brussels)

Out: Note: Flags indicate national team as defined under FIFA eligibility rules; some limited exceptions apply. Players may hold more than one non-FIFA nationality.

No.	Pos.	Nation	Player
10	FW	BRA	Kanu (on loan to Cercle Brugge)
14	MF	BEL	Bart Goor (to Germinal Beerschot)
—	MF	GHA	Gideon Boateng (to MVV)
—	DF	BEL	Cor Gillis (to Mechelen)
—	MF	BEL	Niels Houman (to OH Leuven)
—	MF	CMR	Arnaud Sutchuin (to Roda JC)

=== Cercle Brugge ===
In: Note: Flags indicate national team as defined under FIFA eligibility rules; some limited exceptions apply. Players may hold more than one non-FIFA nationality.

No.	Pos.	Nation	Player
—	FW	IRL	Dominic Foley (from Gent)
—	FW	BRA	Kanu (on loan from Anderlecht)
—	DF	SLO	Dejan Kelhar (from NK Celje)

Out: Note: Flags indicate national team as defined under FIFA eligibility rules; some limited exceptions apply. Players may hold more than one non-FIFA nationality.

No.	Pos.	Nation	Player
10	FW	BEL	Tom De Sutter (to Anderlecht)

=== Charleroi ===
In: Note: Flags indicate national team as defined under FIFA eligibility rules; some limited exceptions apply. Players may hold more than one non-FIFA nationality.

No.	Pos.	Nation	Player
7	MF	BEL	Massimo Moia (from Gent)
—	MF	BEL	Christophe Grégoire (from Willem II)
—	MF	ALG	Adlène Guedioura (from Kortrijk)
—	DF	GER	Torben Joneleit (from AS Monaco)

Out: Note: Flags indicate national team as defined under FIFA eligibility rules; some limited exceptions apply. Players may hold more than one non-FIFA nationality.

No.	Pos.	Nation	Player
7	MF	BEL	Tim Smolders (to Gent)
—	FW	MAR	Abdessalam Benjelloun (to Roeselare)

=== Club Brugge ===
In: Note: Flags indicate national team as defined under FIFA eligibility rules; some limited exceptions apply. Players may hold more than one non-FIFA nationality.

No.	Pos.	Nation	Player
24	MF	GER	Marc-André Kruska (from Dortmund)
32	MF	BEL	Vadis Odjidja-Ofoe (from Hamburg)
—	FW	ALG	Mohamed Dahmane (from Mons)

Out: Note: Flags indicate national team as defined under FIFA eligibility rules; some limited exceptions apply. Players may hold more than one non-FIFA nationality.

No.	Pos.	Nation	Player
9	FW	SRB	Dušan Đokić (on loan to Omonia Nicosia)
17	MF	BEL	Robbe Van Ruyskensvelde (on loan to Dender)
18	MF	CRO	Ivan Leko (to Germinal Beerschot)
27	MF	BEL	Roy Meeus (on loan to Dender)

=== Dender ===
In: Note: Flags indicate national team as defined under FIFA eligibility rules; some limited exceptions apply. Players may hold more than one non-FIFA nationality.

No.	Pos.	Nation	Player
—	FW	BIH	Admir Aganović (from Čukarički Belgrade)
—	MF	CIV	Charles Banga (from Olympic Charleroi)
—	MF	BEL	Roy Meeus (on loan from Club Brugge)
—	FW	FRA	Rudy Saintini (from Olympic Charleroi)
—	MF	BEL	Robbe Van Ruyskensvelde (on loan from Club Brugge)

Out: Note: Flags indicate national team as defined under FIFA eligibility rules; some limited exceptions apply. Players may hold more than one non-FIFA nationality.

No.	Pos.	Nation	Player
3	MF	MNE	Predrag Filipović (to Eendracht Aalst)
19	MF	BEL	Wouter Degroote (to Eendracht Aalst)

=== Genk ===
In: Note: Flags indicate national team as defined under FIFA eligibility rules; some limited exceptions apply. Players may hold more than one non-FIFA nationality.

No.	Pos.	Nation	Player
6	MF	BRA	Ederson Tormena (from Germinal Beerschot)
14	MF	BEL	Tom De Mul (on loan from Sevilla)
26	GK	BEL	Sem Franssen (from Tongeren)
—	FW	BEL	Stein Huysegems (from Twente)

Out: Note: Flags indicate national team as defined under FIFA eligibility rules; some limited exceptions apply. Players may hold more than one non-FIFA nationality.

No.	Pos.	Nation	Player
6	MF	BEL	Wim De Decker (to Germinal Beerschot)
17	FW	BEL	Christian Benteke (to Standard Liège)
26	GK	BEL	Logan Bailly (to Mönchengladbach)
27	GK	BEL	Sinan Bolat (to Standard Liège)

=== Gent ===
In: Note: Flags indicate national team as defined under FIFA eligibility rules; some limited exceptions apply. Players may hold more than one non-FIFA nationality.

No.	Pos.	Nation	Player
—	FW	BIH	Adnan Čustović (from Mouscron)
—	MF	MLI	Kassim Doumbia (from AS Korofina)
—	DF	NOR	Erlend Hanstveit (from Brann Bergen)
—	MF	MLI	Mamoutou N'Diaye (from Jeanne D'Arc Bamako)
—	FW	SEN	Mbaye Leye (from Zulte Waregem)
—	MF	BEL	Tim Smolders (from Charleroi)
—	DF	BEL	Stef Wils (from Westerlo)

Out: Note: Flags indicate national team as defined under FIFA eligibility rules; some limited exceptions apply. Players may hold more than one non-FIFA nationality.

No.	Pos.	Nation	Player
14	FW	CMR	Ernest Nfor (on loan to Zulte Waregem)
18	FW	EIR	Dominic Foley (to Cercle Brugge)
21	MF	BEL	Davy De Beule (to Kortrijk)
22	MF	BEL	Massimo Moia (to Charleroi)
24	DF	SRB	Aleksandar Mutavdžić (to Panserraikos)

=== Germinal Beerschot ===
In: Note: Flags indicate national team as defined under FIFA eligibility rules; some limited exceptions apply. Players may hold more than one non-FIFA nationality.

No.	Pos.	Nation	Player
31	DF	BEL	Mark De Man (from Roda JC)
44	MF	BEL	Bart Goor (from Anderlecht)
—	MF	BEL	Wim De Decker (from Genk)
—	MF	CRO	Ivan Leko (from Club Brugge)
—	DF	MKD	Igor Mitreski (on loan from Cottbus)

Out: Note: Flags indicate national team as defined under FIFA eligibility rules; some limited exceptions apply. Players may hold more than one non-FIFA nationality.

No.	Pos.	Nation	Player
6	MF	BRA	Ederson Tormena (to Genk)
8	DF	BEL	Kris De Wree (to Roda JC)
99	MF	SEN	Khalilou Fadiga (contract terminated)

=== Kortrijk ===
In: Note: Flags indicate national team as defined under FIFA eligibility rules; some limited exceptions apply. Players may hold more than one non-FIFA nationality.

No.	Pos.	Nation	Player
—	FW	FRA	Cédric Bétrémieux (from Roeselare)
—	MF	BEL	Davy De Beule (from Gent)
—	MF	BEL	Mustapha Oussalah (from Mouscron)

Out: Note: Flags indicate national team as defined under FIFA eligibility rules; some limited exceptions apply. Players may hold more than one non-FIFA nationality.

No.	Pos.	Nation	Player
—	MF	ALG	Adlène Guedioura (to Charleroi)

=== Lokeren ===
In: Note: Flags indicate national team as defined under FIFA eligibility rules; some limited exceptions apply. Players may hold more than one non-FIFA nationality.

No.	Pos.	Nation	Player
2	DF	ISR	Yoav Ziv (from Beitar Jerusalem)
—	MF	ARG	Juan Amieva (from Defensores de Belgrano)
—	FW	POL	Dawid Janczyk (on loan from CSKA Moscow)

Out: Note: Flags indicate national team as defined under FIFA eligibility rules; some limited exceptions apply. Players may hold more than one non-FIFA nationality.

No.	Pos.	Nation	Player
27	FW	COD	Patiyo Tambwe (to Hacettepe)
—	FW	MAR	Mohamed Armoumen (to Raja Casablanca)

=== Mechelen ===
In: Note: Flags indicate national team as defined under FIFA eligibility rules; some limited exceptions apply. Players may hold more than one non-FIFA nationality.

No.	Pos.	Nation	Player
—	GK	BEL	Jérémy De Vriendt (from Standard Liège)
—	DF	BEL	Cor Gillis (from Anderlecht)

Out: Note: Flags indicate national team as defined under FIFA eligibility rules; some limited exceptions apply. Players may hold more than one non-FIFA nationality.

No.	Pos.	Nation	Player
12	DF	COD	Jean-Paul Kielo-Lezi (on loan to Brussels)
22	DF	BEL	Pieter Mbemba (on loan to FC Eindhoven)

=== Mons ===
In: Note: Flags indicate national team as defined under FIFA eligibility rules; some limited exceptions apply. Players may hold more than one non-FIFA nationality.

No.	Pos.	Nation	Player

Out: Note: Flags indicate national team as defined under FIFA eligibility rules; some limited exceptions apply. Players may hold more than one non-FIFA nationality.

No.	Pos.	Nation	Player
7	FW	ALG	Mohamed Dahmane (to Club Brugge)
21	FW	ALG	Mohamed Amroune (contract terminated)
27	MF	CIV	Roméo Séka (contract terminated)

=== Mouscron ===
In: Note: Flags indicate national team as defined under FIFA eligibility rules; some limited exceptions apply. Players may hold more than one non-FIFA nationality.

No.	Pos.	Nation	Player

Out: Note: Flags indicate national team as defined under FIFA eligibility rules; some limited exceptions apply. Players may hold more than one non-FIFA nationality.

No.	Pos.	Nation	Player
7	FW	BIH	Adnan Čustović (to Gent)
13	MF	BEL	Mustapha Oussalah (to Kortrijk)

=== Roeselare ===
In: Note: Flags indicate national team as defined under FIFA eligibility rules; some limited exceptions apply. Players may hold more than one non-FIFA nationality.

No.	Pos.	Nation	Player
—	FW	MAR	Abdessalam Benjelloun (from Charleroi)
—	FW	NED	Harrie Gommans (from Roda JC)
—	DF	BEL	Jérémy Huyghebaert (on loan from Auxerre)
—	DF	SRB	Mladen Lazarević (from Partizan Belgrade)
—	FW	NED	Sherjill MacDonald (from West Bromwich Albion)
—	FW	CRO	Ivan Perišić (on loan from Sochaux)
—	MF	NED	Arturo ten Heuvel (free agent)
—	MF	NED	Niels Vorthoren (on loan from Willem II)

Out: Note: Flags indicate national team as defined under FIFA eligibility rules; some limited exceptions apply. Players may hold more than one non-FIFA nationality.

No.	Pos.	Nation	Player
4	DF	FRA	Nasser Daineche (contract terminated)
17	FW	FRA	Cédric Bétrémieux (to Kortrijk)
—	DF	BRA	Felipe Soares (contract terminated)

=== Standard Liège ===
In: Note: Flags indicate national team as defined under FIFA eligibility rules; some limited exceptions apply. Players may hold more than one non-FIFA nationality.

No.	Pos.	Nation	Player
25	FW	BEL	Christian Benteke (from Genk)
38	GK	BEL	Sinan Bolat (from Genk)
—	FW	CIV	Zoro Cyriac Gohi Bi (from ASEC Mimosas)
—	DF	TUR	Mehmet Kiskaç (from Ankaragücü)

Out: Note: Flags indicate national team as defined under FIFA eligibility rules; some limited exceptions apply. Players may hold more than one non-FIFA nationality.

No.	Pos.	Nation	Player
4	DF	BRA	Dante (to Mönchengladbach)
—	GK	BEL	Jérémy De Vriendt (to Mechelen)

=== Tubize ===
In: Note: Flags indicate national team as defined under FIFA eligibility rules; some limited exceptions apply. Players may hold more than one non-FIFA nationality.

No.	Pos.	Nation	Player
—	FW	BIH	Jusuf Dajić (from Jeonbuk Hyundai Motors)
—	MF	RSA	Quinton Fortune (on loan from Brescia)
—	FW	POL	Błażej Radler (from Odra Wodzisław)

Out: Note: Flags indicate national team as defined under FIFA eligibility rules; some limited exceptions apply. Players may hold more than one non-FIFA nationality.

No.	Pos.	Nation	Player

=== Westerlo ===
In: Note: Flags indicate national team as defined under FIFA eligibility rules; some limited exceptions apply. Players may hold more than one non-FIFA nationality.

No.	Pos.	Nation	Player

Out: Note: Flags indicate national team as defined under FIFA eligibility rules; some limited exceptions apply. Players may hold more than one non-FIFA nationality.

No.	Pos.	Nation	Player
3	DF	BEL	Wim Mennes (to Sint-Truiden)
6	DF	BEL	Stef Wils (to Gent)

=== Zulte Waregem ===
In: Note: Flags indicate national team as defined under FIFA eligibility rules; some limited exceptions apply. Players may hold more than one non-FIFA nationality.

No.	Pos.	Nation	Player
—	MF	TTO	Khaleem Hyland (on loan from Portsmouth)
—	FW	FRA	Kamulete Makiese (on loan from Lille)
—	MF	FIN	Eetu Muinonen (from MyPa)
—	FW	EST	Tarmo Neemelo (from MyPa)
—	FW	CMR	Ernest Nfor (on loan from Gent)
—	DF	FRA	Jérémy Taravel (on loan from Lille)

Out: Note: Flags indicate national team as defined under FIFA eligibility rules; some limited exceptions apply. Players may hold more than one non-FIFA nationality.

No.	Pos.	Nation	Player
7	FW	BEL	Tim Matthys (on loan to Panthrakikos)
9	FW	FRA	Zahir Zerdab (contract terminated)
14	FW	SEN	Mbaye Leye (to Gent)
—	FW	BRA	Leandro Barrios (contract terminated)
