= 2006 UEFA European Under-17 Championship =

2006 UEFA Under-17 Championship
Championnat d'Europe de football des moins de 17 ans 2006 U-17-Fußball-Europameisterschaft 2006

Tournament details
- Host country: Luxembourg
- Dates: 3–14 May
- Teams: 8
- Venues: 6 (in 6 host cities)

Final positions
- Champions: Russia (1st title)
- Runners-up: Czech Republic
- Third place: Spain
- Fourth place: Germany

Tournament statistics
- Matches played: 16
- Goals scored: 46 (2.88 per match)
- Attendance: 19,743 (1,234 per match)
- Top scorer(s): (Germany) Manuel Fischer (Spain) Bojan (Czech Republic) Tomáš Necid (5 goals each)
- Best player: (Germany) Toni Kroos

The 2006 UEFA European Under-17 Championship was the fifth edition of UEFA's European Under-17 Football Championship. Luxembourg hosted the championship, during 3–14 May. Russia defeated the Czech Republic in the final to win the competition for the first time. Players born after 1 January 1989 could participate in this competition.

== Squads ==
Is for 17 and younger normally Between late May to early June

== Qualifying ==
There were two qualifying rounds.

== Venues ==
Ettelbruck	Luxembourg	Hesperange
Stade Am Deich	Stade Josy Barthel	Stade Alphonse Theis
Capacity: 2,020	Capacity: 8,022	Capacity: 3,058
2006 UEFA European Under-17 Championship is located in Luxembourg
Grevenmacher	Mondorf-les-Bains	Dudelange
Op Flohr Stadion	Stade John Grün	Stade Jos Nosbaum
Capacity: 550	Capacity: 3,500	Capacity: 2,558

== Teams ==
Belgium
Czech Republic
Germany
Hungary
Luxembourg (host)
Russia
Serbia and Montenegro
Spain

== Match Officials ==
A total of 6 referees, 8 assistant referees and 2 fourth officials were appointed for the final tournament.

Referees

- (Scotland) William Collum
- (Austria) Thomas Einwaller
- (Estonia) Hannes Kaasik
- (Netherlands) Björn Kuipers
- (Belarus) Alexey Kulbakov
- (North Macedonia) Aleksandar Stavrev

Assistant referees

- (Portugal) José Bolinhas
- (Wales) Edward King
- (Croatia) Igor Krmar
- (Bulgaria) Vesselin Dobrianov
- (Switzerland) Manuel Navarro
- (Norway) Dag Roger Nebben
- (Turkey) Cem Șatman
- (Slovakia) Tomas Somolani

Fourth officials

- (Luxembourg) Albert Toussaint
- (Luxembourg) Luc Wilmes

== Group stage ==
=== Group A ===
Teams	GP	W	D	L	GF	GA	GD	Pts	Status
Spain	3	3	0	0	12	1	+11	9	Advanced to the semifinals
Russia	3	2	0	1	3	3	0	6	Advanced to the semifinals
Hungary	3	1	0	2	4	3	+1	3	
Luxembourg	3	0	0	3	1	13	−12	0	

3 May 2006
17:00 CET

Hungary	0–1	Russia
	Report	Morozov 78'

Stade John Grün, Mondorf-les-Bains
Attendance: 320
Referee: Willie Collum (Scotland)
3 May 2006
19:00 CET

Luxembourg	1–7	Spain
Pjanić 73'	Report	Aarón 6', 18'; Ramos 13'; Bojan 48', 69', 76'; Hermosa 55'

Stade Alphonse Theis, Hesperange
Attendance: 3,550
Referee: Hannes Kaasik (Estonia)

5 May 2006
17:00 CET

Spain	3–0	Russia
Aarón 59'; Vergara 64'; Gullón 74'	Report

Stade Alphonse Theis, Hesperange
Attendance: 360
Referee: Björn Kuipers (Netherlands)
5 May 2006
19:30 CET

Luxembourg	0–4	Hungary
	Report	Németh 42', 28'; Koman 64' (pen.); Nikházi 76'

Stade John Grün, Mondorf-les-Bains
Attendance: 2,050
Referee: Aleksei Kulbakov (Belarus)

8 May 2006
17:30 CET

Russia	2–0	Luxembourg
Gorbatenko 32'; Korotayev 75'	Report

Stade Alphonse Theis, Hesperange
Attendance: 1,450
Referee: Aleksandar Stavrev (Macedonia)
8 May 2006
17:30 CET

Spain	2–0	Hungary
Ramos 18'; Bojan 76' (pen.)	Report

Stade Am Deich, Ettelbruck
Attendance: 653
Referee: Thomas Einwaller (Austria)

=== Group B ===
Teams	GP	W	D	L	GF	GA	GD	Pts	Status
Germany	3	2	1	0	8	0	+8	7	Advanced to the semifinals
Czech Republic	3	2	1	0	5	2	+3	7	Advanced to the semifinals
Serbia and Montenegro	3	0	1	2	2	7	−5	1	
Belgium	3	0	1	2	2	8	−6	1	

3 May 2006
17:00 CET

Belgium	0–4	Germany
	Report	Gillis 2' (o.g.); Fischer 35'; Kroos 51' (pen.); Lorenz 80'

Stade Am Deich, Ettelbruck
Attendance: 960
Referee: Aleksandar Stavrev (Macedonia)
3 May 2006
19:00 CET

Serbia and Montenegro	1–2	Czech Republic
Vuković 72'	Report	Necid 49', 67'

Stade Jos Nosbaum, Dudelange
Attendance: 400
Referee: Thomas Einwaller (Austria)

5 May 2006
17:00 CET

Belgium	1–1	Serbia and Montenegro
Aquino 71'	Report	Karadžić 83'

Stade Jos Nosbaum, Dudelange
Attendance: 530
Referee: Hannes Kaasik (Estonia)
5 May 2006
19:00 CET

Germany	0–0	Czech Republic
	Report

Stade Op Flor, Grevenmacher
Attendance: 1,425
Referee: Willie Collum (Scotland)

8 May 2006
19:30 CET

Germany	4–0	Serbia and Montenegro
Fischer 5', 22', 37'; Reinartz 65'	Report

Stade Josy Barthel, Luxembourg
Attendance: 900
Referee: Björn Kuipers (Netherlands)
8 May 2006
19:30 CET

Czech Republic	3–1	Belgium
Wojnar 11'; Necid 42', 72'	Report	Carcela 75'

Stade Op Flor, Grevenmacher
Attendance: 450
Referee: Aleksei Kulbakov (Belarus)

== Knockout stage ==
=== Semifinals ===
11 May 2006
20:15 CET

Germany	0–1	Russia
	Report	Prudnikov 72'

Stade Josy Barthel, Luxembourg
Attendance: 1,350
Referee: Willie Collum (Scotland)

11 May 2006
17:30 CET

Spain	0–2	Czech Republic
	Report	Pekhart 31'; Vošahlík 58'

Stade Am Deich, Ettelbruck
Attendance: 1,335
Referee: Aleksandar Stavrev (Macedonia)

=== Third Place Playoff ===
14 May 2006
15:00 CET

Spain	1–1	Germany
Bojan 53'	Report	Fischer 68'
Penalties
Savall (penalty scored); Baena (penalty scored); Ortiz (penalty missed); Bojan (penalty scored)	3–2	(penalty scored) Marin; (penalty scored) Vrančić; (penalty missed) Fischer; (penalty missed) Schorch; (penalty missed) Kroos

Stade John Grün, Mondorf-les-Bains
Attendance: 1,250
Referee: Aleksei Kulbakov (Belarus)

=== Final ===
14 May 2006
19:00 CET

Czech Republic	2–2	Russia
Pekhart 80+3'; Necid 88'	Report	Prudnikov 46'; Marenich 86'
Penalties
Vácha (penalty scored); Wojnar (penalty missed); Holek (penalty scored); Necid (penalty scored)	3–5	(penalty scored) Shcherbak; (penalty scored) Gagloyev; (penalty scored) Prudnikov; (penalty scored) Amirkhanov; (penalty scored) Korotayev

Stade Josy Barthel, Luxembourg City
Attendance: 2,760
Referee: Björn Kuipers (Netherlands)

== Goalscorers ==
Team	#	Players	Goals
(Spain)	20	Bojan	5
(Germany)	9	Manuel Fischer	5
(Czech Republic)	10	Tomáš Necid	5
(Spain)	10	Aarón	3
(Hungary)	9	Krisztián Németh	2
(Spain)	14	Rubén Ramos	2
(Russia)	9	Aleksandr Prudnikov	2
(Czech Republic)	11	Tomáš Pekhart	2
(Russia)	2	Sergei Morozov	1
(Spain)	18	José Hermosa	1
(Luxembourg)	9	Miralem Pjanić	1
(Germany)	10	Toni Kroos	1
(Germany)	18	Raphael Lorenz	1
(Serbia and Montenegro)	11	Veljko Vuković	1
(Spain)	11	Cristian Vergara	1
(Spain)	8	Marcos Gullón	1
(Hungary)	7	Vladimir Koman	1
(Hungary)	10	Márk Nikházi	1
(Belgium)	17	Mauricio Aquino	1
(Serbia and Montenegro)	17	Darko Karadžić	1
(Russia)	10	Igor Gorbatenko	1
(Russia)	7	Yevgeny Korotayev	1
(Germany)	13	Stefan Reinartz	1
(Czech Republic)	17	Petr Wojnar	1
(Belgium)	16	Mehdi Carcela	1
(Czech Republic)	7	Jan Vošahlík	1
(Russia)	18	Aleksandr Marenich	1
Total Goals: 46 ( 1 own goals ); Match Played: 16

== Golden Player ==
- (Germany) Toni Kroos
