= Radler (surname) =

Radler is a surname. Notable people with the surname include:

- Ariane Rädler (born 1995), Austrian alpine skier
- Błażej Radler (born 1982, Rydułtowy), Polish professional footballer
- F. David Radler (born 1944, Montreal, Quebec), Canadian executive and close associate of Conrad Black
- Dorothy Raedler (born 1917, New York City)
- Josef Karl Rädler (1844–1917), Austrians porcelain painter
- Antonie Rädler (1899–1991), Marian religious visionary who founded the Maria vom Sieg shrine in Wigratzbad
