= Mutavdžić =

Mutavdžić (Serbian: Мутавџић) is a Serbian surname. It may refer to:

- Aleksandar Mutavdžić (born 1977), Serbian footballer
- Miljan Mutavdžić (born 1986), Serbian footballer

Around 70 people with the surname were killed during the Second World War in the Jasenovac concentration camp by Fascist Ustashe forces.
