= Saintini =

Saintini is a surname. Notable people with the surname include:

- Nathanaël Saintini (born 2000), Guadeloupean footballer
- Rudy Saintini (born 1987), French footballer
