= Luxembourg national under-17 football team =

Men's national U-17 association football team

Luxembourg Under 17
- Nickname(s): D'Rout Léiwen; Les Lions Rouges; Die Roten Löwen (The Red Lions)
- Association: Fédération Luxembourgeoise de Football (FLF)
- Head coach: René Peters
First colours	Second colours	Third colours

First international
- Slovakia 4–1 Luxembourg (29 September 2001)

Biggest win
- Luxembourg 5–0 Liechtenstein (25 April 2026)

Biggest defeat
- Czech Republic 7–0 Luxembourg (1 October 2001); Luxembourg 0–7 Northern Ireland (30 October 2019)

The Luxembourg national under-17 football team is the under-17 football team of Luxembourg. It is controlled by the Luxembourg Football Federation.

== Competition history ==
=== FIFA Under-17 World Cup ===
Luxembourg have, as of the 2024 tournament, not made it to the finals of any FIFA Under-17 World Cup.

=== UEFA European Under-17 Championship ===
Before 2002, the event was classified as a U-16 tournament.

UEFA European Under-17 Championship record										UEFA European Under-17 Championship qualification record					
Year	Round	Position	Pld	W	D	L	GF	GA	Squad	Pld	W	D	L	GF	GA
(Denmark) 2002	Did not qualify									3	0	0	3	1	14
(Portugal) 2003	Did not qualify									3	1	0	2	1	2
(France) 2004	Did not qualify									3	1	0	2	2	9
(Italy) 2005	Did not qualify									3	1	0	2	3	4
(Luxembourg) 2006	Group Stage	4th	3	0	0	3	1	13	Squad	Qualified as hosts					
(Belgium) 2007	Did not qualify									3	0	2	1	1	3
(Turkey) 2008	Did not qualify									3	1	1	1	4	7
(Germany) 2009	Did not qualify									2	0	2	0	1	1
(Liechtenstein) 2010	Did not qualify									3	1	1	1	4	5
(Serbia) 2011	Did not qualify									3	1	0	2	4	3
(Slovenia) 2012	Did not qualify									6	1	2	3	7	9
(Slovakia) 2013	Did not qualify									3	0	0	3	3	14
(Malta) 2014	Did not qualify									3	0	1	2	3	7
(Bulgaria) 2015	Did not qualify									3	1	0	2	3	4
(Azerbaijan) 2016	Did not qualify									3	0	0	3	2	10
(Croatia) 2017	Did not qualify									3	0	1	2	3	6
(England) 2018	Did not qualify									3	0	1	2	2	4
(Republic of Ireland) 2019	Did not qualify									3	0	0	3	3	13
(Estonia) ~~2020~~	Tournament cancelled due to COVID-19 pandemic									3	0	0	3	1	17
(Cyprus) ~~2021~~	Tournament cancelled due to COVID-19 pandemic									Qualification cancelled					
(Israel) 2022	Group Stage	4th	3	0	0	3	0	7	Squad	5	3	1	1	8	4
(Hungary) 2023	Did not qualify									3	1	0	2	4	9
(Cyprus) 2024	Did not qualify									3	0	2	1	2	5
(Albania) 2025	Did not qualify									5	1	2	2	3	7
(Estonia) 2026	Did not qualify									5	1	1	3	7	8
(Latvia) 2027	To be determined									To be determined					
Total	2/23		6	0	0	6	1	20		77	14	17	46	72	165

== Current squad ==
The following players were called up for the 2026 UEFA European Under-17 Championship qualification matches against the Armenia, Liechtenstein and Hungary on 22, 25 and 28 April 2025; respectively.

Caps and goals correct as of 14 October 2025, after the match against Poland.

No.	Pos.	Player	Date of birth (age)	Caps	Goals	Club
	GK	Max Gillen	23 January 2009 (age 17)	0	0	(Luxembourg Football Federation) Etzella Ettelbruck
	GK	Eltion Morina	25 June 2009 (age 17)	2	0	(Luxembourg Football Federation) Belval Belvaux
	DF	Lucca Cantante	29 June 2009 (age 17)	2	0	(French Football Federation) US Thionville Lusitanos
	DF	Cristiano de Castro Rolo	24 September 2009 (age 17)	2	0	(French Football Federation) US Thionville Lusitanos
	DF	Tiago Geraldes	2 December 2009 (age 16)	0	0	(Luxembourg Football Federation) F91 Dudelange
	DF	Santiago Inacio Santos	14 February 2009 (age 17)	0	0	(Luxembourg Football Federation) Swift Hesperange
	DF	Daris Osmanovic	24 March 2009 (age 17)	0	0	(Luxembourg Football Federation) UN Käerjéng 97
	MF	Mateo Carreira	28 December 2009 (age 16)	0	0	(Luxembourg Football Federation) Etzella Ettelbruck
	MF	Edson Cruz Taveira	4 November 2009 (age 17)	1	0	(Luxembourg Football Federation) AS Red Black Luxembourg
	MF	Maurice Mehlen	21 June 2010 (age 16)	0	0	(Luxembourg Football Federation) Racing Union
	MF	Tiago Oliveira Martins	1 July 2009 (age 17)	2	0	(Luxembourg Football Federation) Etzella Ettelbruck
	MF	Jo Pimenta	11 November 2009 (age 16)	2	0	(Luxembourg Football Federation) Etzella Ettelbruck
	MF	Jerimo Rock	19 February 2009 (age 17)	0	0	(Luxembourg Football Federation) Marisca Mersch
	MF	Marceu Soares Delgado	2 March 2009 (age 17)	0	2	(Luxembourg Football Federation) Differdange 03
	FW	Cristiano Alves Macedo	28 April 2009 (age 17)	0	0	(French Football Federation) US Thionville Lusitanos
	FW	Kilian Elias Nascimento	10 February 2009 (age 17)	2	0	(Luxembourg Football Federation) US Rumelange
	FW	Charel Elombo	8 July 2009 (age 17)	0	0	(Luxembourg Football Federation) Swift Hesperange
	FW	Jess Gomes	9 February 2009 (age 17)	7	1	(French Football Federation) FC Metz
	FW	Saiyen Moreira	13 September 2009 (age 17)	0	0	(Luxembourg Football Federation) Racing Union
	FW	Adin Sakalic	23 May 2010 (age 16)	2	0	(Luxembourg Football Federation) Racing Union

== See also ==
- Luxembourg Football Federation
- Luxembourg national football team
- Football in Luxembourg
