= Holek (surname) =

- Language: Czech

Origin
- Region of origin: Czech Republic

Holek is a Czech surname. Notable people with the surname include:

- Mario Holek (born 1986), Czech footballer
- Martin Holek (born 1989), Czech footballer
- Stan Holek (1933–2015), Canadian professional wrestler
- Václav Holek (1886–1954), Czech firearm engineer
