= Predrag Filipović =

Predrag Filipović may refer to:

- Predrag Filipović (racewalker) (born 1978), Serbian racewalker
- Predrag Filipović (footballer) (born 1975), Montenegrin footballer
