= Laurens ten Heuvel =

Dutch footballer and coach

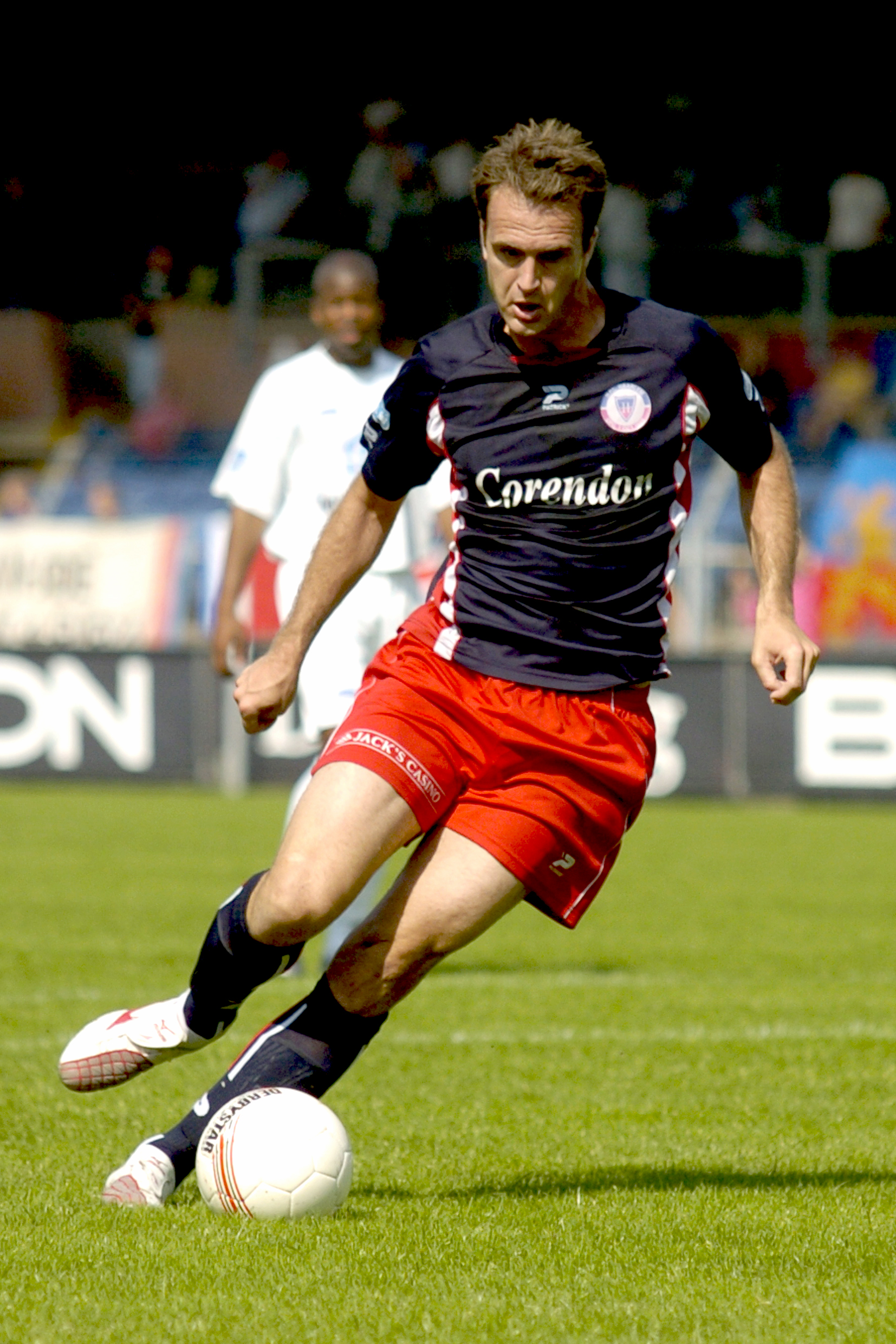
- Ten Heuvel with Haarlem in 2008

Personal information
- Date of birth: 6 June 1976 (age 50)
- Place of birth: Amsterdam, Netherlands
- Position: Striker

Team information
- Current team: Koninklijke HFC (Under-21 Head coach)

Youth career
- JOS
- Ajax
- Haarlem

Senior career*
Years	Team	Apps	(Gls)
1995	Den Bosch	3	(0)
1996–1998	Barnsley	8	(0)
1998	→ Northampton Town (loan)	0	(0)
1998–2000	First Vienna	58	(12)
2000–2001	DCG		
2001–2002	Stormvogels Telstar	31	(20)
2002–2003	Sheffield United	5	(0)
2003	→ Bradford City (loan)	5	(0)
2003	→ Grimsby Town (loan)	4	(0)
2003–2004	De Graafschap	15	(5)
2004–2006	Haarlem	53	(21)
2006–2008	RBC	51	(13)
2008	→ Stormvogels Telstar (loan)	10	(6)
2008–2010	Haarlem	56	(9)
2010–2011	Katwijk	28	(6)
2011–2013	Ajax Amateurs	28	(6)
Total		355	(98)

Managerial career
- 2013–2014: Ajax Amateurs
- 2014–2017: SV Zandvoort
- 2017–2018: Koninklijke HFC
- 2018–2019: Voetbalvereniging Amstelveen
- * Club domestic league appearances and goals

Laurens ten Heuvel (born 6 June 1976) is a Dutch football manager and former professional footballer who is head coach of the under-21 team at Koninklijke HFC.

He played as a striker notably in the Premier League with Barnsley and in the Austrian Bundesliga with First Vienna. He also had a short spell in the Eredivise with FC Den Bosch, however he would spend most of his time in Dutch football in the second and third tiers with DCG, Stormvogels Telstar, De Graafschap, HFC Haarlem, RBC Roosendaal, Katwijk and Ajax Amateurs. He also played in the English Football League for Northampton Town, Sheffield United, Bradford City and Grimsby Town.

As a coach he had spells as manager of Ajax Amateurs, AJSV Zandvoort, Koninklijke HFC and Voetbalvereniging Amstelveen.

== Playing career ==
=== Barnsley ===
In the summer of 1996, ten Heuvel signed for First Division club Barnsley for £75,000. He made his debut in a 1–1 draw away to Ipswich Town on 1 October 1996, coming on as an 87th minute substitute for Peter Shirtliff. He would make 3 appearances all season as the club were promoted to the Premier League, finishing 2nd to Bolton Wanderers.

Whilst with the Tykes he played twice in the Premier League against Aston Villa and Southampton.

=== Sheffield United ===
In the summer of 2002 he returned to England, signing a two-year contract with First Division side Sheffield United.

On 29 March 2003, ten Heuvel was loaned out to First Division rival Bradford City for the remainder of the 2002–03 season.

At the beginning of the 2003–04 season, he signed for Grimsby Town on a one-month loan.

=== Return to the Netherlands ===
Upon his release from Sheffield United, ten Heuvel joined De Graafschap, initially on trial before signing a one-year contract. He signed with Haarlem in 2004 and in 2008 he returned to Haarlem after a two-year spell at RBC.

He retired in 2013 at Ajax Amateurs.

== Coaching career ==
In 2014 he was named Head Coach of SV Zandvoort, and in 2017 he took charge of Koninklijke HFC.

He is now the head coach of the over-18's team at SC Buitenveldert.

== Personal life ==
Ten Heuvel is the older brother of Arturo ten Heuvel.
