= Josef Karl Rädler =

Austrian painter (1844–1917)

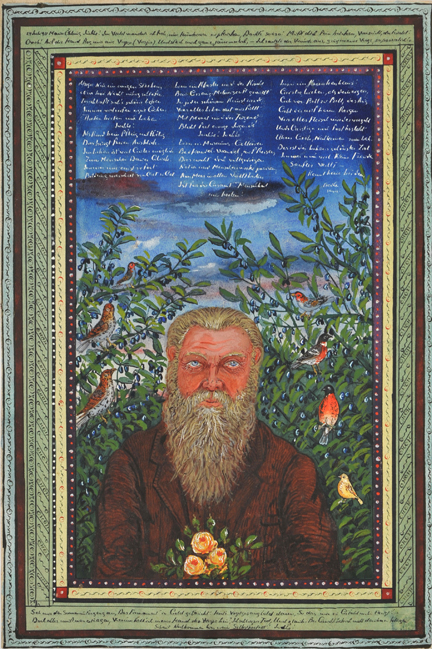

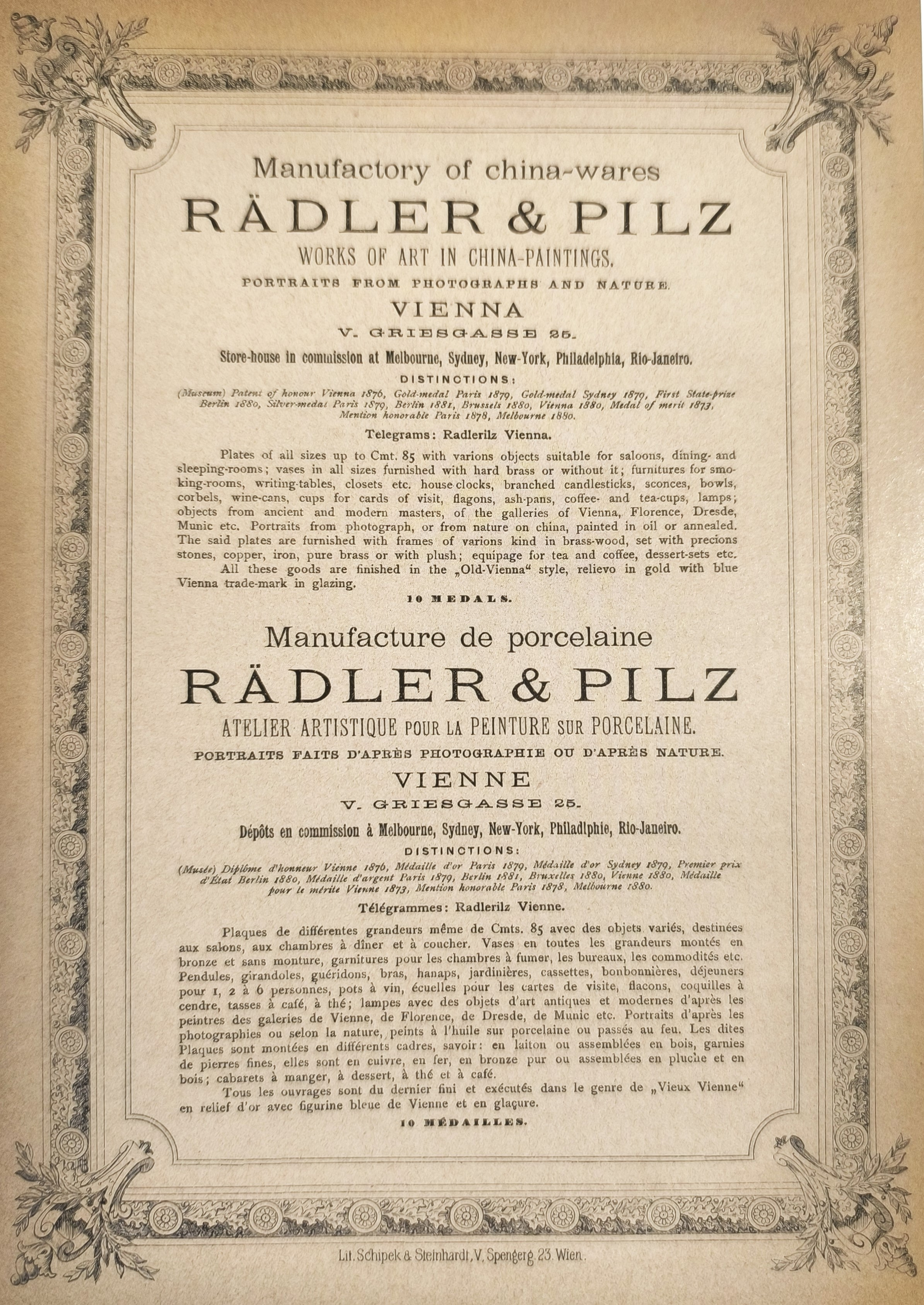
Rädler & Pilz Atelier Vienna

Josef Karl Rädler (9. September 1844 — 13. November 1917) was an Austrian porcelain and watercolor painter. He has been described as "one of the most exciting self-taught artists to be discovered in recent years" and a representant of art brut. In 1872, he founded with Robert Pilz a porcelain painting studio named Artistische Atelier für Porzellanmalerei Rädler & Pilz in Vienna.

Rädler painted about 400 watercolors while an inpatient at an asylum.

== Early life ==
Josef Karl Rädler was born in 1844 in Sokolov, Czech Republic, from the middle ages part of Kingdom Bohemia and then part of the Austrian Empire. He was the son of Josef Anton Radler (1808–1880) and Barbara Theresia Bach (1811–1878), a family with many other artists.

Between 1852 and 1856 he learned in Horní Slavkov at Haas & Czjzek Porcelain Manufactory as a painter of porcelain. At the age of 23, he moved to Vienna. He established there in 1870 a famous porcelain workshop Rädler & Pilz. In the years 1878-1890 the company was at its peak, with branches in London, Paris, Melbourne, warehouses in Australia, North and South America. In 1886 it received the status of c. and k. Austrian court supplier.

1872 married with Albine Anna Pilz, and fathered four children. In 1889 Rädler's wife opened a fashion salon. In 1890 Rädler broke up with Pilz, and then went it alone. The company soon got into trouble. Rädler embarked in legal battles protecting his trademark.

His wife had to make hand-make hats to complement their income.

In his late 40s, severe mood swings led him down a path of unrealistic business ventures and protracted legal battles, ultimately resulting in his commitment to the Viennese asylum at Pilgerhain in 1893. There, he received a diagnosis of "secondary dementia", which today might be likened to schizophrenia.

== Paintings and creative expression ==
In 1897, during his confinement at the asylum, Rädler began producing watercolor paintings. His works often used both sides of the paper, where one side featured relatively realistic imagery, and the other contained intricately woven symbolic figures and text.

In 1905, Rädler was transferred to a state-of-the-art sanatorium at Mauer-Öhling. There, he had access to expansive grounds and an amusement area where patients congregated for communal activities. His subject matter expanded significantly, transitioning from birds to portraits of fellow patients and landscapes of the hospital grounds.

== Legacy ==
The discovery of Rädler's work in the 1960s marked a turning point in his posthumous recognition. Approximately 400 of his watercolors were rescued from a rubbish heap at Mauer-Öhling. Austrian psychiatrist Leo Navratil played a role in bringing Rädler's art to the public eye. In 1994, Rädler's works were displayed at the Lower Austria Museum. The Wellcome Collection in London also showcased his paintings in 2009 in an exhibition titled Madness & Modernity: Mental Illness and the Visual Arts in Vienna 1900.
