= Mehmet Sarper Kiskaç =

Turkish footballer

Mehmet Sarper Kıskaç
Personal information
- Full name: Mehmet Sarper Kıskaç
- Date of birth: July 9, 1990 (age 36)
- Place of birth: Kadıköy, Turkey
- Height: 1.87 m (6 ft 1 1/2 in)
- Position: Central defender

Youth career
- 2005—2008: Ankaragücü
- 2009–2010: Standard Liège

Senior career*
Years	Team	Apps	(Gls)
2006—2009	Ankaragücü	0	(0)
2008	→ Aksarayspor (loan)	2	(0)
2010—2012	RFC de Liège	2	(0)
2012–2013	BB Erzurumspor		
2013	Ankara Demirspor		

International career
2006	Turkey U16	10	(0)
2006—2008	Turkey U17	2	(0)
- * Club domestic league appearances and goals

Mehmet Sarper Kıskaç (born July 9, 1990, in Kadıköy, Turkey) is a Turkish football player.

== Career ==
He played central defender for Standard Liège in the Jupiler League and MKE Ankaragücü. On 31 August 2010 announced his re-sign with Standard Liège and joined to local rival RFC de Liège.
