= Michel Kettenmeyer =

Luxembourgish footballer

Personal information
- Date of birth: 7 February 1989 (age 37)
- Place of birth: Luxembourg
- Height: 1.83 m (6 ft 0 in)
- Position: Defensive midfielder

Senior career*
Years	Team	Apps	(Gls)
2006–2015	Differdange 03	122	(5)
2015–2016	→ UNA Strassen (loan)	29	(2)
2016–2020	Titus Pétange	28	(0)
2017–2018	→ Lorentzweiler (loan)		
2020–2022	Käerjéng 97		
2022–2023	Belvaux		

International career^{‡}
2010	Luxembourg	2	(0)
- * Club domestic league appearances and goals as of 22:28, 27 June 2023 (UTC) ‡ National team caps and goals as of 22:22, 6 January 2021 (UTC)

Michel Kettenmeyer (born 7 February 1989) is a Luxembourgish former international footballer who played as a defensive midfielder.

== Career ==
Kettenmeyer has played for FC Differdange 03, FC UNA Strassen, Union Titus Pétange, FC Lorentzweiler and UN Käerjéng 97.

He earned 2 international caps for Luxembourg in 2010.
