= José Hermosa =

Spanish footballer

Personal information
- Full name: José Manuel Hermosa Melis
- Date of birth: 23 April 1989 (age 37)
- Place of birth: Villajoyosa, Spain
- Height: 1.78 m (5 ft 10 in)
- Position: Left back

Youth career
- Villarreal

Senior career*
Years	Team	Apps	(Gls)
2007–2009	Villarreal C	52	(8)
2009–2010	Atlético C	21	(5)
2010–2011	Atlético B	14	(3)
2011–2013	Osasuna B	12	(0)
2012	Osasuna	0	(0)
2014	Ontinyent	12	(1)
2014–2015	Marbella	8	(0)
2015	→ Lucena (loan)	10	(0)
2017–2018	La Nucía	35	(0)
2018–2019	Alcoyano	29	(0)
2019–2021	La Nucía	29	(0)

International career
2006	Spain U17	7	(1)
- * Club domestic league appearances and goals

José Manuel Hermosa Melis (born 23 April 1989) is a Spanish former footballer. Mainly a left back, he also appeared as a left midfielder.

== Football career ==
Born in Villajoyosa, Alicante, Valencia, Hermosa was a product of Villarreal CF's youth system, and made senior debuts with the C-team in the 2007–08 campaign, in Tercera División. In the 2009 summer he moved to Atlético Madrid, being also assigned to the C's.

In June 2010 Hermosa was promoted to the reserves in Segunda División B, but only started in six matches during the season. In July of the following year he moved to another reserve team, CA Osasuna B also in the third level.

Hermosa made his first team debut on 12 January 2012, replacing fellow youth graduate Eneko Satrústegui in the 72nd minute of a 1–2 home loss against FC Barcelona, for the season's Copa del Rey. He spent the vast majority of his spell with the B-side, and was released in May 2013.

On 31 January 2014 Hermosa signed for Ontinyent CF. He appeared in 12 matches during the campaign, also suffering relegation, and moved to fellow league team Marbella FC on 5 August.

On 30 January 2015 Hermosa was loaned to Lucena CF also in the third division, until June.
