= Sergey Morozov (footballer, born 1989) =

Russian footballer

Sergei Morozov
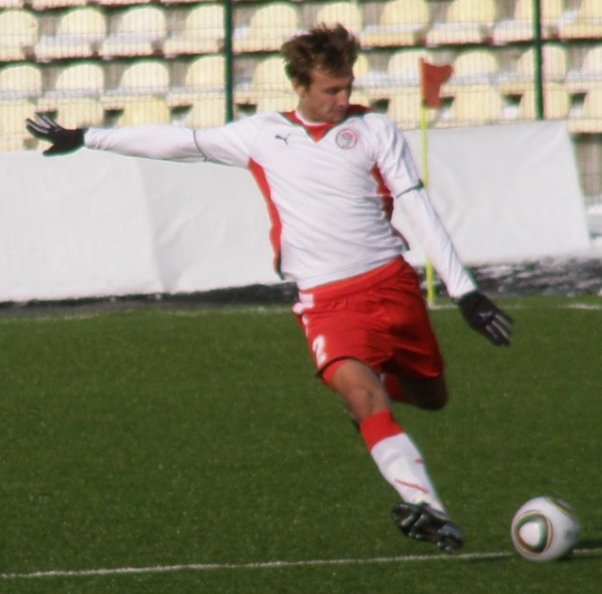

Personal information
- Full name: Sergei Borisovich Morozov
- Date of birth: 3 March 1989 (age 37)
- Place of birth: Moscow, Russian SFSR
- Height: 1.90 m (6 ft 3 in)
- Position: Centre back

Youth career
- –2005: FC Torpedo Moscow

Senior career*
Years	Team	Apps	(Gls)
2005–2008	FC Torpedo Moscow	19	(2)
2009–2010	FC Amkar Perm	0	(0)
2011–2013	FC Neftekhimik Nizhnekamsk	55	(4)
2013	FC SKA-Energiya Khabarovsk	4	(0)
2014	FC Avangard Kursk	23	(0)
2015–2018	FC Neftekhimik Nizhnekamsk	68	(6)
2019–2020	FC Zvezda Perm	23	(1)
2020	FC Volga Ulyanovsk	13	(3)
2021–2022	FC KAMAZ Naberezhnye Chelny	35	(4)
2022	FK Turon Yaypan	10	(2)

International career
2005–2006	Russia U-17	12	(2)
2007–2008	Russia U-19	7	(1)
2009	Russia U-21	1	(0)
- * Club domestic league appearances and goals

Sergei Borisovich Morozov (Russian: Серге́й Борисович Морозов; born 3 March 1989) is a Russian former professional footballer.

== Club career ==
He made his professional debut in the Russian First Division in 2007 for FC Torpedo Moscow.

== International career ==
Morozov was one of the key members of the Russian U-17 squad that won the 2006 UEFA U-17 Championship.
