= Jérémy De Vriendt =

Belgian footballer

Personal information
- Date of birth: 22 March 1986 (age 40)
- Place of birth: Sambreville, Belgium
- Height: 1.86 m (6 ft 1 in)
- Position: Goalkeeper

Senior career*
Years	Team	Apps	(Gls)
2007–2009	Standard Liège	3	(0)
2009–2011	KV Mechelen	0	(0)
2011–2012	White Star Woluwe	16	(0)
- * Club domestic league appearances and goals as of 24 May 2012 ‡ National team caps and goals as of 24 July 2010

Jérémy De Vriendt (born 22 March 1986) is a Belgian football goalkeeper. He previously played for Standard Liège, KV Mechelen and White Star Woluwe.
