= Rubén Ramos (footballer, born 1989) =

Spanish footballer

Personal information
- Full name: Rubén Ramos Martínez
- Date of birth: 31 January 1989 (age 37)
- Place of birth: Leganés, Spain
- Height: 1.82 m (6 ft 0 in)
- Position: Forward

Youth career
- 1995–2007: Atlético Madrid

Senior career*
Years	Team	Apps	(Gls)
2007–2009	Atlético Madrid B	54	(14)
2009–2011	Real Madrid B	19	(3)
2011	Brescia	4	(0)
2012	Lucena	10	(0)
2012–2013	Fuenlabrada	36	(14)
2013–2014	Puerta Bonita	35	(3)
2014–2016	Alcoyano	62	(4)
2016–2017	Murcia	13	(1)
2017–2018	SS Reyes	30	(5)
2018–2019	Internacional Madrid	18	(5)
2019	Castellón	16	(2)
2019–2022	Internacional Madrid	84	(16)
2022–2023	Las Rozas	24	(3)

International career
2006	Spain U17	11	(5)
2007	Spain U19	1	(0)
- * Club domestic league appearances and goals as of 15:46, 8 February 2024 (UTC)

Rubén Ramos Martínez (Spanish pronunciation: [ruˈβen ˈramos maɾˈtineθ]; born 31 January 1989) is a Spanish professional footballer who plays as a forward.

== Club career ==
Born in Leganés, Madrid, Ramos only played lower league football in his country, starting out at Atlético Madrid B in the 2007–08 season. In 2009, he moved to city rivals Real Madrid, and was assigned to the reserves also in the Segunda División B.

Free agent Ramos signed with Italian club Brescia Calcio in August 2011, but the international clearance only arrived two months later. He played the first of only four matches as a professional on 8 October, coming on as a 68th-minute substitute in a 2–1 away loss against Calcio Padova in the Serie B.

Ramos returned to Spain in January 2012, joining Lucena CF of the third division. He continued to compete in that tier in the following years, representing CF Fuenlabrada, CD Puerta Bonita, CD Alcoyano, Real Murcia, UD San Sebastián de los Reyes, Internacional de Madrid (two spells) and CD Castellón.
