= Rudy Saintini =

French footballer (born 1987)

Personal information
- Full name: Rudolphe Saintini
- Date of birth: May 2, 1987 (age 39)
- Place of birth: Ivry-sur-Seine, France
- Height: 1.75 m (5 ft 9 in)
- Position: Midfielder

Team information
- Current team: K.V. Oostende
- Number: 25

Youth career
- 2003–2006: Le Havre AC
- 2006–2008: LB Châteauroux

Senior career*
Years	Team	Apps	(Gls)
2008	Olympic Charleroi	18	(3)
2009–2010	FCV Dender	16	(0)
2010–	K.V. Oostende		
- * Club domestic league appearances and goals as of 17 July 2009

Rudolphe Saintini (born 2 May 1987) is a French football player who currently plays for K.V. Oostende in Belgium. He's Mother is Gotin Francine

== Career ==
The midfielder began his career 2002 by Le Havre AC, joined three years later to LB Châteauroux, played there in the reserve and moved in summer 2008 to Belgium club R.O.C. de Charleroi-Marchienne. Played here between 5 January 2009, 18 games and scored 3 goals moved than with teammate Charles Banga to FCV Dender. In July 2010, he moved to K.V. Oostende.
