= Wouter Degroote =

Belgian footballer

Personal information
- Date of birth: 28 January 1978 (age 48)
- Place of birth: Ghent, Belgium
- Height: 1.74 m (5 ft 9 in)
- Position: Attacking midfielder

Youth career
- S.V. Zulte Waregem

Senior career*
Years	Team	Apps	(Gls)
1997–2004	Zulte Waregem		
2004–2005	FC Denderleeuw		
2005–2009	FCV Dender EH		
2009–2011	Eendracht Aalst		
- * Club domestic league appearances and goals as of 9 November 2015

Wouter Degroote (born 28 January 1978) is a Belgian former footballer.

He previously played for clubs including FCV Dender EH.
