= Arturo ten Heuvel =

Dutch footballer

Personal information
- Date of birth: 20 December 1978 (age 47)
- Place of birth: Amsterdam, Netherlands
- Position: Midfielder

Youth career
- 1983-1986: JOS Watergraafsmeer
- 1986-1987: Ajax
- 1987-1991: Zeeburgia

Senior career*
Years	Team	Apps	(Gls)
1997–1999	Haarlem	22	(0)
1999–2003	Volendam	98	(11)
2003–2006	Haarlem	102	(16)
2006–2008	FC Den Bosch	74	(13)
2009–2010	Roeselare	17	(1)
2011	Katwijk		
2012–2014	Ajax Zaterdag		

Managerial career
- 2014–2020: Almere City (youth)
- * Club domestic league appearances and goals

Arturo ten Heuvel (born 20 December 1978) is a Dutch retired footballer who played for HFC Haarlem, FC Volendam, FC Den Bosch, Roeselare, Katwijk and Ajax Zaterdag during the span of his playing career. He is a youth coach and managed the D2 squad (under-13) at Almere City FC.

== Career ==
He began his career with Eerste Divisie outfits Haarlem and Volendam, and later played for FC Den Bosch before being released in May 2008 at the end of his contract. After half a season without a club, he then joined Belgian top-tier side KSV Roeselare.

== Personal life ==
He is the younger brother of retired footballer Laurens ten Heuvel.
