= Op Flohr Stadion =

Football stadium in Grevenmacher, Luxembourg

Coordinates: 49.6869°N 6.4485°E

Stade Op Flohr
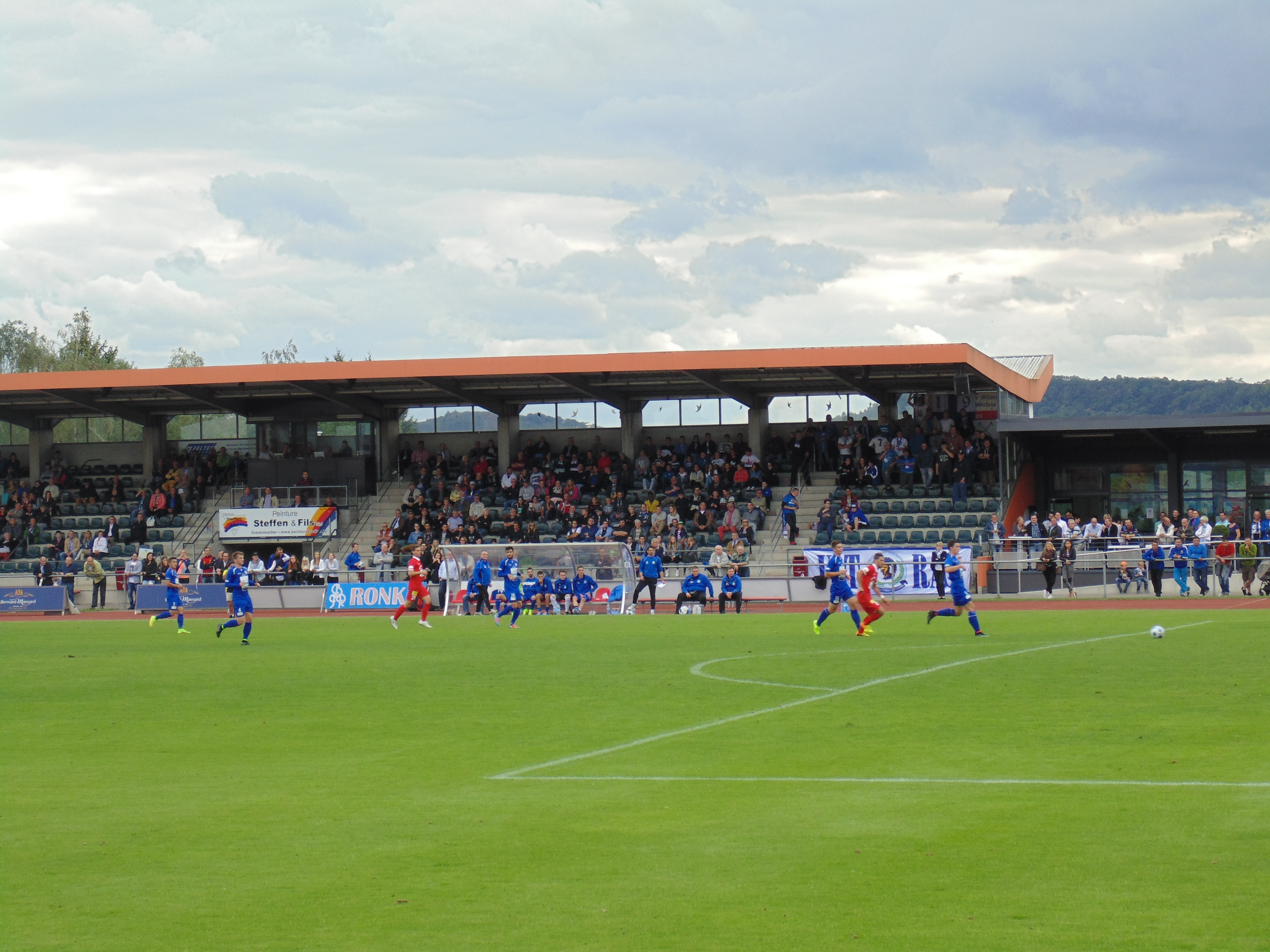
- Stade Op Flohr, only stand
- Interactive map of Stade Op Flohr
- Full name: Stade Op Flohr
- Location: Grevenmacher, Luxembourg
- Capacity: 562
- Surface: grass

Construction
- Opened: 1983
- Renovated: 2006

Tenant
- CS Grevenmacher

Op Flohr Stadion is a multi-use stadium in Grevenmacher, Luxembourg.

It is currently used mostly for football matches and is the home stadium of CS Grevenmacher. The stadium holds 4,062 people.

== Gallery ==
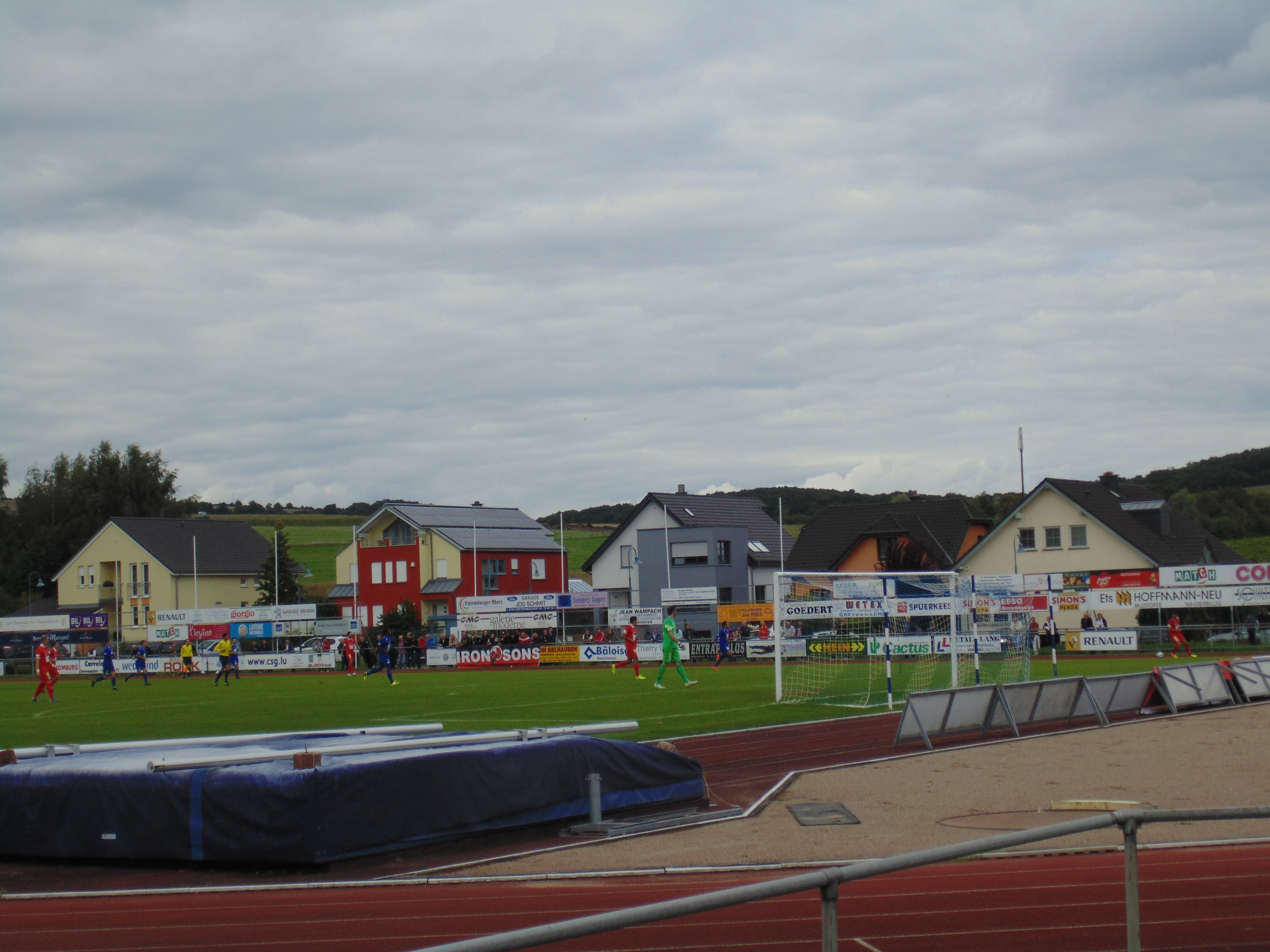
Stade Op Flohr, southeast side

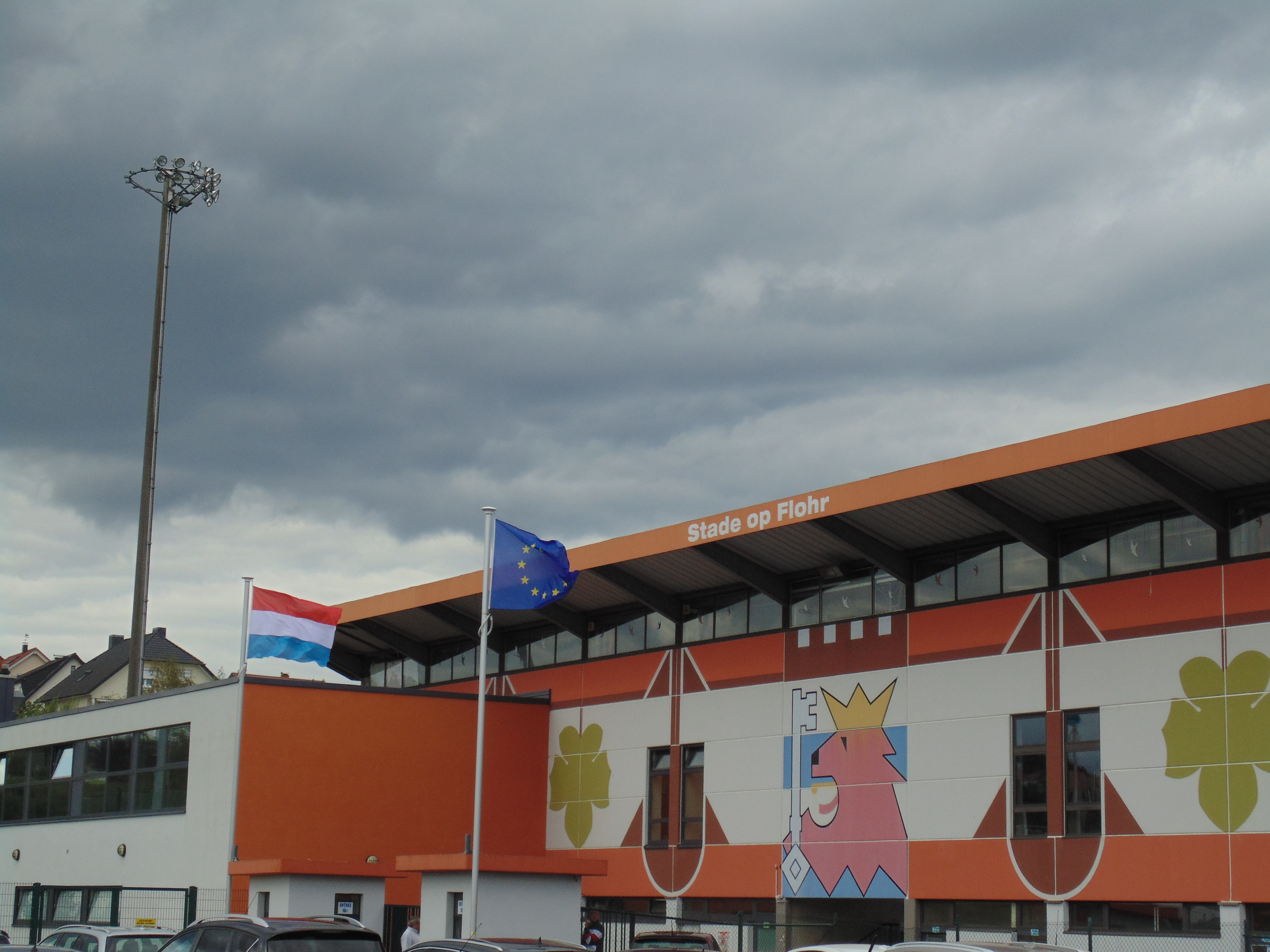
Stade Op Flohr, entrance side
