= Roman Amirkhanov =

Russian footballer

Personal information
- Full name: Roman Vladimirovich Amirkhanov
- Date of birth: 13 May 1989 (age 37)
- Place of birth: Revda, Russian SFSR
- Height: 1.74 m (5 ft 9 in)
- Positions: Midfielder; defender

Youth career
- –2007: FC Lokomotiv Moscow

Senior career*
Years	Team	Apps	(Gls)
2008	FC Lokomotiv Moscow	0	(0)
2009–2010	FC Sibir Novosibirsk	4	(0)
2010	PFC Spartak Nalchik	1	(0)
2011	FC Olimpia Gelendzhik	5	(0)
2012	Skonto Riga	23	(1)
2013	FC SKA-Energiya Khabarovsk	9	(0)
2014–2015	FC Yakutiya Yakutsk	12	(1)

International career
2005–2006	Russia U17	8	(0)
2009	Russia U21	1	(0)
- * Club domestic league appearances and goals

Roman Vladimirovich Amirkhanov (Russian: Роман Владимирович Амирханов; born 13 May 1989) is a Russian former professional footballer.

== International career ==
Amirkhanov was one of the members of the Russian U17 squad that won the 2006 UEFA U17 Championship.
