= Marcos Gullón =

Spanish footballer

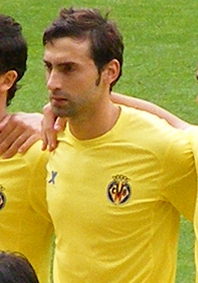
- Gullón before a game with Villarreal in 2011

Personal information
- Full name: Marcos Gullón Ferrera
- Date of birth: 20 February 1989 (age 37)
- Place of birth: Madrid, Spain
- Height: 1.85 m (6 ft 1 in)
- Position: Midfielder

Youth career
- Escuela Fútbol A.F.E
- 2003–2007: Villarreal

Senior career*
Years	Team	Apps	(Gls)
2007–2008	Villarreal C	20	(0)
2008–2012	Villarreal B	121	(6)
2010–2012	Villarreal	2	(0)
2012–2013	Racing Santander	44	(4)
2013–2016	Apollon Limassol	58	(5)
2016–2017	Roda	30	(1)
2018–2019	Fuenlabrada	15	(1)
2019–2020	S.S. Reyes	17	(1)
2020–2021	Las Rozas	8	(0)
Total		315	(18)

International career
2004–2005	Spain U16	4	(1)
2006	Spain U17	10	(1)
2009	Spain U20	7	(0)
2009	Spain U21	3	(0)
- * Club domestic league appearances and goals

Marcos Gullón Ferrera (born 20 February 1989) is a Spanish former professional footballer who played as a midfielder.

== Club career ==
Born in Madrid, Gullón started his career with Villarreal CF, going on to represent both reserve teams in his beginnings as a senior. In the 2008–09 season, whilst with the B side, he contributed 36 games – play-offs included – as they promoted to Segunda División for the first time ever.

Gullón continued to be first choice for the B's in the following years. His competitive input with the main squad, however, consisted of six matches, the first occurring on 29 October 2009 in a 1–1 away draw against CD Puertollano in the round of 32 of the Copa del Rey. His maiden appearance in La Liga took place ten days later, as he came on as an 87th-minute substitute in the 3–2 loss at Sevilla FC.

In 2011–12, Gullón experienced three relegations as both Villarreal A and B dropped down a level – in the latter case, in spite of ranking in 12th position in the second tier. He signed for top-flight club Racing de Santander in January 2012, and they finished dead last.

After another drop with the Cantabrians, Gullón spent the following two and a half seasons in the Cypriot First Division with Apollon Limassol FC, scoring four goals from 31 appearances in his first to help his team to the third place. In 2016, in another winter transfer window move, he joined Roda JC Kerkrade from the Dutch Eredivisie.

== International career ==
Across four age groups, Gullón earned 24 caps for Spain. The first of three for the under-21 side came on 4 September 2009, as he featured the full 90 minutes in a 2–0 win over Poland for the 2011 UEFA European Championship qualifiers at the Estadio Carlos Tartiere, providing the assist for Joselu's goal.

== Career statistics ==
As of 8 February 2015

Club	Season	League			Cup		Continental		Total	
Club	Season	Division	Apps	Goals	Apps	Goals	Apps	Goals	Apps	Goals
Villarreal	2009–10	La Liga	1	0	1	0	0	0	2	0
Villarreal	2010–11	La Liga	1	0	0	0	2 (Note: Appearances in UEFA Europa League)	0	3	0
Villarreal	2011–12	La Liga	0	0	1	0	1 (Note: Appearances in UEFA Champions League)	0	2	0
Villarreal	Total		2	0	2	0	3	0	7	0
Racing Santander	2011–12	La Liga	10	0	0	0	—		10	0
Racing Santander	2012–13	Segunda División	34	4	1	0	—		35	4
Racing Santander	Total		44	4	1	0	—		45	4
Apollon Limassol	2013–14	Cypriot First Division	31	4	7	1	8	0	46	5
Apollon Limassol	2014–15	Cypriot First Division	11	1	0	0	6	1	17	2
Apollon Limassol	Total		42	5	7	1	14	1	63	7
Career total			88	9	10	1	17	1	115	11

== Honours ==
Fuenlabrada

- Segunda División B: 2018–19

Spain U20

- Mediterranean Games: 2009
