= Denis Shcherbak =

Russian footballer (born 1989)

Personal information
- Full name: Denis Vladimirovich Shcherbak
- Date of birth: 17 August 1989 (age 37)
- Place of birth: Omsk, USSR
- Height: 1.78 m (5 ft 10 in)
- Position: Midfielder

Youth career
- –2002: Molniya Omsk
- 2003–2006: Konoplyov football academy

Senior career*
Years	Team	Apps	(Gls)
2006–2007	FC Krylia Sovetov-SOK Dimitrovgrad	39	(3)
2008	FC Togliatti	5	(5)
2009	AC Bellinzona		
2009	FC Krylia Sovetov Samara	0	(0)
2010	FC Irtysh Omsk	5	(0)
2011–2014	FC Syzran-2003	42	(1)
2014	FC Volga Ulyanovsk	8	(1)
2015–2016	FC Strogino Moscow	34	(1)
2017	FC Lada-Togliatti	7	(0)
2017–2018	FC Murom	23	(3)

International career
2005–2006	Russia U-17	5	(0)
- * Club domestic league appearances and goals

Denis Vladimirovich Shcherbak (Russian: Денис Владимирович Щербак; born 17 August 1989) is a Russian former professional footballer.

== Club career ==
He made his professional debut in the Russian Second Division in 2006 for FC Krylia Sovetov-SOK Dimitrovgrad.

He played in the Russian Football National League for FC Irtysh Omsk in 2010.

== International career ==
Shcherbak was one of the members of the Russian U-17 squad that won the 2006 UEFA U-17 Championship.

== Personal ==
He is a son of Vladimir Shcherbak.
