= Błażej Radler =

Polish footballer

Personal information
- Full name: Błażej Radler
- Date of birth: 2 August 1982 (age 44)
- Place of birth: Rydułtowy, Poland
- Height: 1.90 m (6 ft 3 in)
- Position: Defender

Team information
- Current team: Piast Przyrów
- Number: 3

Senior career*
Years	Team	Apps	(Gls)
1998–2000	Rymer Niedobczyce		
2001–2007	Górnik Zabrze	105	(7)
2004–2005	→ Podbeskidzie (loan)	25	(2)
2008	Odra Wodzisław	11	(0)
2009	AFC Tubize	9	(0)
2009–2010	Znicz Pruszków	29	(1)
2010	Odra Wodzisław	17	(2)
2011–2013	Pogoń Szczecin	33	(3)
2013	Energetyk ROW Rybnik	14	(3)
2013–2015	Chojniczanka Chojnice	47	(2)
2015–2016	Raków Częstochowa	37	(1)
2016–2017	Unia Turza Śląska	15	(0)
2017–2018	Odra Wodzisław Śląski		
2018	MKS 32 Radziejów	11	(1)
2020–	Piast Przyrów	110	(30)

International career
2000–2001	Poland U18		
Medal record
Men's football
Representing Poland
UEFA European Under-18 Championship
Winner	2001 Finland
- * Club domestic league appearances and goals as of 22:28, 24 June 2025 (UTC)

Błażej Radler (Polish pronunciation: [ˈbwa.ʐɛi̯ ˈrad.lɛr]; born 2 August 1982) is a Polish footballer who plays as a defender for Klasa A club Piast Przyrów.

== Club career ==
Previously he played for Górnik Zabrze in the Polish Ekstraklasa.

In February 2011, he joined Pogoń Szczecin one and a half contract.

== International career ==
He was a member of the Poland national under-18 football team which won the U-18 European Championship in 2001.

== Honours ==
Energetyk ROW Rybnik

- II liga West: 2012–13

Poland U18

- UEFA European Under-18 Championship: 2001
