= Predrag Filipović (footballer) =

Montenegrin footballer

Personal information
- Full name: Predrag Filipović
- Date of birth: 12 January 1975 (age 51)
- Place of birth: Titograd, SFR Yugoslavia
- Height: 1.86 m (6 ft 1 in)
- Position: Left back

Senior career*
Years	Team	Apps	(Gls)
1996–1997	Proleter Zrenjanin	44	(1)
1998–1999	Obilić	10	(0)
1999–2001	Eendracht Aalst	59	(1)
2001–2002	Lommel	29	(0)
2002–2005	Roda JC	113	(4)
2006–2007	Lokeren	45	(0)
2007–2009	Dender	41	(0)
2009–2015	Eendracht Aalst	127	(14)
2023-	Eendracht Nieuwerkerken	1	(0)
Total		469	(6)

International career
- FR Yugoslavia U21

Managerial career
- 2023-: Eendracht Nieuwerkerken
- * Club domestic league appearances and goals

Predrag Filipović (Serbian Cyrillic: Предраг Филиповић; born 12 January 1975) is a Montenegrin retired footballer.

== Club career ==
He left Dutch Eredivisie club Roda JC for Lokeren in January 2006. In July 2007, he moved from SC Lokeren to Dender and was transferred in January 2009 back to Eendracht Aalst, his first club in Belgium.

Filipović also holds Belgian nationality. During the 1990s he played in First League of FR Yugoslavia clubs FK Proleter Zrenjanin and FK Obilić.

== Post-playing career ==
He worked as a mailman in Belgium after retiring as a player and took up his first coaching post in 2023 with Belgian amateur side Eendracht Nieuwerkerken.

== Honours ==
Obilić

- First League of FR Yugoslavia: 1997–98
