= Aleksandar Mutavdžić =

Serbian footballer

Personal information
- Full name: Aleksandar Mutavdžić
- Date of birth: 3 January 1977 (age 49)
- Place of birth: Kraljevo, SFR Yugoslavia
- Height: 1.86 m (6 ft 1 in)
- Positions: Left back; left winger

Youth career
- Goč Vrnjačka Banja
- Red Star Belgrade

Senior career*
Years	Team	Apps	(Gls)
1996–1999	Rad	62	(5)
1999–2002	Germinal Beerschot	67	(14)
2002–2005	Standard Liège	18	(0)
2006	CSKA Sofia	3	(0)
2006–2007	Cercle Brugge	24	(0)
2007–2008	AA Gent	28	(0)
2009	Panserraikos	9	(0)
Total		211	(19)
- * Club domestic league appearances and goals

Aleksandar Mutavdžić (Serbian Cyrillic: Александар Мутавџић; born 3 January 1977) is a Serbian footballer who played as a left midfielder.

He has played for FK Rad, K.A.A. Gent, Standard Liège, G. Beerschot, CSKA Sofia and Cercle Brugge.

== Career ==
Mutavdžić started his career in FK Rad before moving to Belgium.

Mutavdžić played 2 games for Germinal Beerschot at the start of 2002-03 season before signed by Standard Liège. But a knee injury made his season came to early end in January 2003. He came out from injury in January 2004. But in 2004-05 season he was excluded in first team although played twice in UEFA Cup.

In January 2006, he was signed for PFC CSKA Sofia along with countryman Oliver Kovačević. he was released at the end of season and moved to Cercle Brugge.

== Personal life ==
Mutavdžić also holds Belgian nationality.
