= Martin Holek =

Czech football player (born 1989)

Personal information
- Date of birth: 29 May 1989 (age 37)
- Place of birth: Czechoslovakia
- Height: 1.96 m (6 ft 5 in)
- Position: Forward

Team information
- Current team: Kroměříž
- Number: 13

Senior career*
| Years | Team | Apps | (Gls) |
| 2011–2013 | Ústí nad Labem | 20 | (2) |
| 2013–2015 | Slovácko | | |
| 2014 | → Karviná (loan) | 12 | (2) |
| 2015–2017 | Bayern Hof | 68 | (41) |
| 2017–2018 | Wacker Burghausen | 38 | (11) |
| 2018–2019 | Türkgücü München | 10 | (2) |
| 2019 | Baník Sokolov | 5 | (0) |
| 2019–2020 | Bayern Hof | 13 | (4) |
| 2020–2021 | Blansko | 9 | (0) |
| 2021–2024 | Hodonín | 79 | (29) |
| 2025– | Kroměříž | 16 | (4) |

International career
| 2004–2005 | Czech Republic U16 | 9 | (1) |
| 2005–2006 | Czech Republic U17 | 19 | (0) |
| 2006–2007 | Czech Republic U18 | 12 | (1) |
| 2008 | Czech Republic U19 | 3 | (0) |
Medal record
Men's football
Representing Czech Republic
UEFA European Under-17 Championship
| Runner-up | 2006 Luxembourg |
- * Club domestic league appearances and goals as of 15 June 2025

Martin Holek (born 29 May 1989) is a Czech footballer who plays as a forward for Kroměříž. He has represented his country at under-19 level.
