= Petr Wojnar =

Czech footballer

Personal information
- Full name: Petr Wojnar
- Date of birth: 12 January 1989 (age 37)
- Place of birth: Třinec, Czechoslovakia
- Height: 1.77 m (5 ft 9 1/2 in)
- Position: Midfielder

Team information
- Current team: FC Hlučín

Youth career
- 1995–2001: Fotbal Třinec
- 2001–2008: FC Baník Ostrava

Senior career*
Years	Team	Apps	(Gls)
2008–2011	Ostrava	20	(0)
2010–2011	→ Kladno (loan)	26	(11)
2011–2015	Mladá Boleslav	12	(1)
2012	→ Karviná (loan)	7	(0)
2012–2013	→ Vlašim (loan)	13	(4)
2013–2014	→ Třinec (loan)	21	(2)
2014	→ Banská Bystrica (loan)	11	(0)
2015	→ Vítkovice (loan)		
2016	Vítkovice		
2017–	Hlučín		

International career
2009	Czech Republic U-20	2	(0)
2009–2010	Czech Republic U-21	3	(1)
- * Club domestic league appearances and goals as of 9 August 2019

Petr Wojnar (born 12 January 1989) is a Czech football player who plays as a midfielder.

He was a member of the Czech under-20 squad in the 2009 FIFA U-20 World Cup.
