= Jan Vošahlík =

Czech footballer

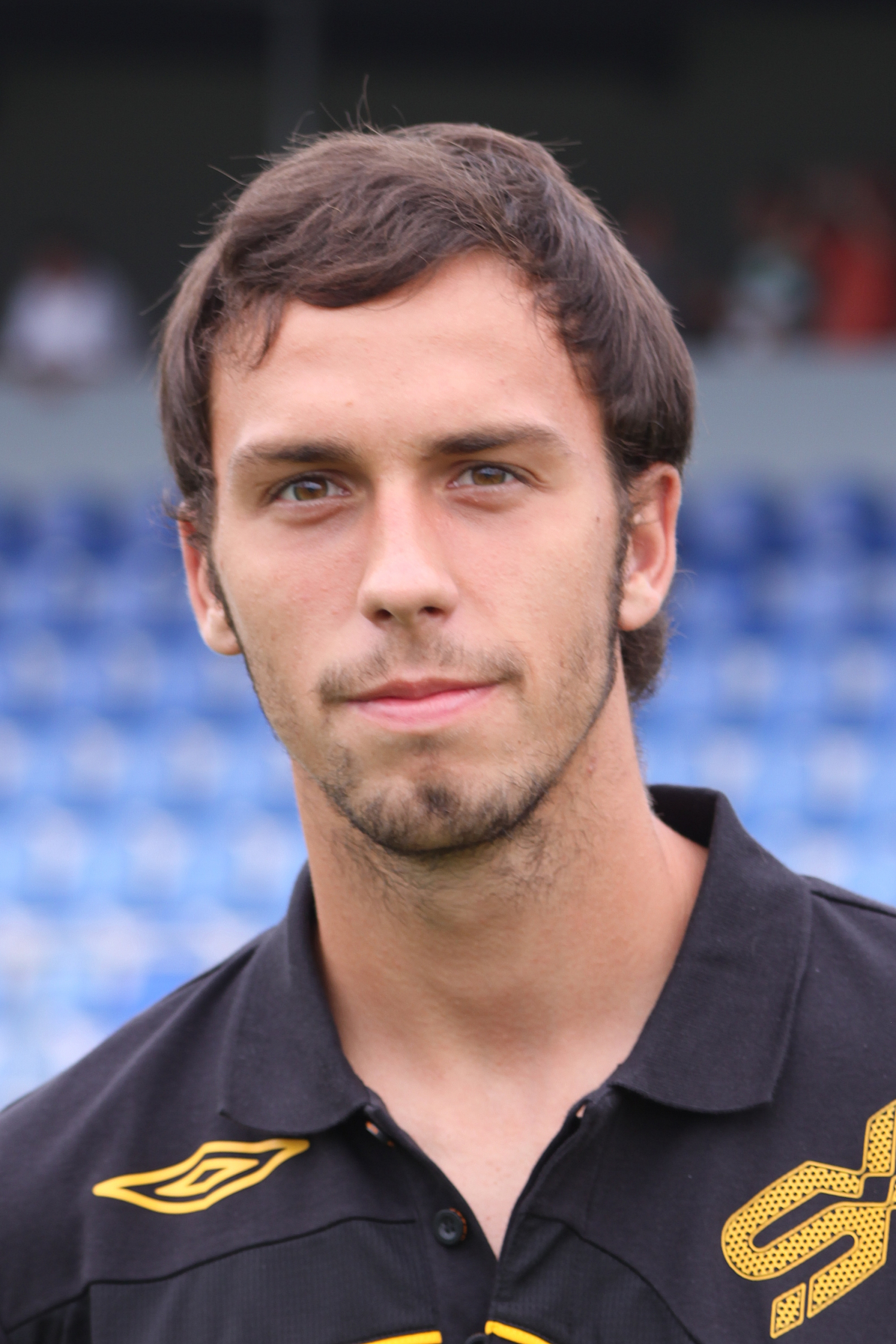

Personal information
- Full name: Jan Vošahlík
- Date of birth: 8 March 1989 (age 37)
- Place of birth: Příbram, Czechoslovakia
- Height: 1.86 m (6 ft 1 in)
- Positions: Winger; forward

Team information
- Current team: SV Gaflenz
- Number: 9

Youth career
- 1997–2002: Marila Příbram
- 2002–2004: Slavia Prague
- 2004–2005: Marila Příbram

Senior career*
Years	Team	Apps	(Gls)
2005–2006	Příbram	21	(1)
2007–2014	Jablonec	76	(7)
2008	→ Čáslav (loan)	13	(2)
2008–2009	→ Střížkov Prague (loan)	24	(2)
2012–2013	→ Slavia Prague (loan)	20	(4)
2013–2016	Slavia Prague	10	(0)
2014	→ České Budějovice (loan)	13	(2)
2015	→ Shakhter Karagandy (loan)	26	(0)
2016	Příbram	8	(0)
2016–2017	Mezőkövesd-Zsóry	6	(0)
2017–2019	Teplice	32	(3)
2019	Prostějov	13	(5)
2019	Kavala	11	(4)
2020–	SV Gaflenz	3	(1)

International career
2010–2011	Czech Republic U-21	14	(3)
- * Club domestic league appearances and goals as of 21:03, 24 May 2020 (UTC)

Jan Vošahlík (born 8 March 1989) is a Czech professional footballer who plays as a winger or forward for Austrian club SV Gaflenz.
