= Charles Banga =

Ivorian footballer

Personal information
- Full name: Charles Damoi Mandella Banga
- Date of birth: June 17, 1981 (age 45)
- Place of birth: Abidjan, Ivory Coast
- Height: 1.80 m (5 ft 11 in)
- Position: Midfielder

Team information
- Current team: FCV Dender
- Number: 13

Youth career
- 2001–2005: Toumodi FC

Senior career*
Years	Team	Apps	(Gls)
2005–2008	R.O.C. de Charleroi-Marchienne	78	(12)
2009–	FCV Dender		
- * Club domestic league appearances and goals

Charles Damoi Mandella Banga (born 17 July 1981) is an Ivorian footballer, who currently plays as a left midfielder for FCV Dender in Belgium.

== Career ==
Banga began his career in 2001 with Toumodi FC and joined in July 2005 the Belgian club R.O.C. de Charleroi-Marchienne. He played 78 games, scoring 12 goals. He moved on 5 January 2009 from R.O.C. de Charleroi-Marchienne to FCV Dender.
