= Spain national under-17 football team =

Spain U-17

Spain U-17
- Nickname: La Rojita (The Little Red One)
- Association: Real Federación Española de Fútbol (RFEF)
- Confederation: UEFA (Europe)
- Head coach: Sergio García
- Most caps: Abel Ruiz (38)
- Top scorer: Abel Ruiz (25)
- FIFA code: ESP
First colours	Second colours

First international
- Spain 1–0 Uruguay (Livorno, Italy; 18 August 1991)

Biggest win
- Spain 13–0 New Zealand (Ismaïlia, Egypt; 15 September 1997)

Biggest defeat
- Spain 1–6 France (Goiânia, Brazil; 11 November 2019) Records for competitive matches only.

FIFA U-17 World Cup
- Appearances: 12 (first in 1991)
- Best result: Runners-up (1991, 2003, 2007, 2017)

European Championship
- Appearances: 15 (first in 2002)
- Best result: Champions (2007, 2008, 2017)

Spain national under-17 football team
Medal record

Men's under-17 football

U-17 World Cup
Silver medal – second place	1991 Italy	Team
Bronze medal – third place	1997 Egypt	Team
Silver medal – second place	2003 Finland	Team
Silver medal – second place	2007 South Korea	Team
Bronze medal – third place	2009 Nigeria	Team
Silver medal – second place	2017 India	Team

U-17 European Championship
Silver medal – second place	2003 Portugal	Team
Silver medal – second place	2004 France	Team
Bronze medal – third place	2006 Luxembourg	Team
Gold medal – first place	2007 Belgium	Team
Gold medal – first place	2008 Turkey	Team
Silver medal – second place	2010 Liechtenstein	Team
Silver medal – second place	2016 Azerbaijan	Team
Gold medal – first place	2017 Croatia	Team

The Spain national under-17 football team represents Spain in international football at this age level and is controlled by Royal Spanish Football Federation, the governing body for football in Spain.

Considered one of the strongest national teams in under 17 level, Spain has participated in 9 out of 14 World Cup tournaments. Spain hold the record of playing the most finals without ever winning the tournament, having finished as runners-up on four occasions.

== Competitive record ==
=== FIFA U-17 World Cup record ===
Year	Round	Position	GP	W	D*	L	GS	GA
(China) 1985	Did not qualify							
(Canada) 1987	Did not qualify							
(Scotland) 1989	Did not qualify							
(Italy) 1991	Runners-up	2nd	6	4	1	1	13	5
(Japan) 1993	Did not qualify							
(Ecuador) 1995	Group stage	9th	3	1	1	1	4	4
(Egypt) 1997	Third place	3rd	6	5	0	1	22	6
(New Zealand) 1999	Group stage	9th	3	1	1	1	7	2
(Trinidad and Tobago) 2001	Group stage	10th	3	1	0	2	4	6
(Finland) 2003	Runners-up	2nd	6	4	1	1	16	10
(Peru) 2005	Did not qualify							
(South Korea) 2007	Runners-up	2nd	7	4	3	0	13	6
(Nigeria) 2009	Third place	3rd	7	5	1	1	18	10
(Mexico) 2011	Did not qualify							
(United Arab Emirates) 2013	Did not qualify							
(Chile) 2015	Did not qualify							
(India) 2017	Runners-up	2nd	7	5	0	2	17	10
(Brazil) 2019	Quarter-finals	6th	5	3	1	1	10	8
(Indonesia) 2023	Quarter-finals	5th	5	3	1	1	7	4
(Qatar) 2025	Did not qualify							
(Qatar) 2026	In progress	TBD	1	1	0	0	5	0
(Qatar) 2027	To be determined							
(Qatar) 2028	To be determined							
(Qatar) 2029	To be determined							
Total:12/21	Runners-up	2nd	59	37	10	12	136	71

=== UEFA European U-17 Championship record ===
Year	Round	GP	W	D*	L	GS	GA
(Denmark) 2002	Fourth place	8	5	2	1	21	11
(Portugal) 2003	Runners-up	8	5	2	1	21	9
(France) 2004	Runners-up	8	5	1	2	19	7
(Italy) 2005	Elite round	3	2	1	0	3	1
(Luxembourg) 2006	Third place	8	5	2	1	19	5
(Belgium) 2007	Champions	8	6	2	0	12	3
(Turkey) 2008	Champions	11	8	3	0	29	9
(Germany) 2009	Group stage	9	4	5	0	14	4
(Liechtenstein) 2010	Runners-up	11	9	0	2	37	7
(Serbia) 2011	Elite round	6	5	0	1	18	6
(Slovenia) 2012	Elite round	6	4	2	0	17	4
(Slovakia) 2013	Elite round	6	3	0	3	9	8
(Malta) 2014	Elite round	6	4	1	1	8	2
(Bulgaria) 2015	Quarter-finals	11	5	6	0	14	5
(Azerbaijan) 2016	Runners-up	12	8	4	0	18	6
(Croatia) 2017	Champions	12	8	3	1	30	9
(England) 2018	Quarter-finals	10	5	3	2	16	8
(Republic of Ireland) 2019	Semi-finals	11	8	1	2	20	6
(Estonia) ~~2020~~	Cancelled due to COVID-19 pandemic						
(Cyprus) ~~2021~~	Cancelled due to COVID-19 pandemic						
(Israel) 2022	Quarter-finals	4	2	1	1	6	3
(Hungary) 2023	Semi-finals	5	3	1	1	10	6
(Cyprus) 2024	Group stage	3	0	0	3	2	6
(Albania) 2025	did not qualify						
(Estonia) 2026	Semi-finals	4	2	1	1	8	5
(Latvia) 2027	To be determined						
(Lithuania) 2028	To be determined						
(Moldova) 2029	To be determined						
Total:15/22	3 Titles	168	105	41	23	351	130

*Denotes draws include knockout matches decided on penalty kicks.

- Gold background color indicates first-place finish. Silver background color indicates second-place finish. Bronze background color indicates third-place finish.

== Honours ==
- FIFA U-17 World Cup

- Runners-up (4): 1991, 2003, 2007, 2017
- Third place (2): 1997, 2009

- UEFA U-17/16 Championship (U-17 since 2002)

- Winners (9): 1986, 1988, 1991, 1997, 1999, 2001, 2007, 2008, 2017
- Runners-up (6): 1992, 1995, 2003, 2004, 2010, 2016
- Third place (3): 1985, 1998, 2006

== Individual awards ==
In addition to team victories, Spanish players have won individual awards at UEFA European Under-17 Football Championship.

Year	Golden Player
(France) 2004	Cesc Fàbregas
(Belgium) 2007	Bojan Krkić

In addition to team victories, Spanish players have won individual awards at FIFA World Cup Under-17 Football Championship.

Year	Golden Player	Golden Shoe
(Egypt) 1997	Sergio Santamaría	David Rodríguez Fraile
(Finland) 2003	Cesc Fàbregas	Cesc Fàbregas
(Nigeria) 2009		Borja Bastón

== Player records ==
=== Top appearances ===
Rank	Player	Club(s)	Year(s)	U-17 caps
1	Abel Ruiz	Barcelona	2015–2017	38
2	Ignacio Camacho	Atlético Madrid	2006–2007	25
3	Albert Dalmau	Barcelona	2008–2009	23
	Manu Morlanes	Villarreal	2014–2016	23
5	Sergio Gómez	Barcelona	2016–2017	22
	Borja	Atlético Madrid	2008–2009	22
	Ferran Torres	Valencia	2016–2017	22
8	David Rodríguez	Atlético Madrid	2002–2003	21
	Gerard Deulofeu	Barcelona	2009–2011	21
	Hugo Guillamón	Valencia	2016–2017	21
	Isco	Valencia	2008–2009	21
	Javi García	Real Madrid	2003–2005	21
	Jaime Gavilán	Valencia	2001–2003	21
	Koke	Atlético Madrid	2008–2009	21

Note: Club(s) represents the permanent clubs during the player's time in the Under-17s.

=== Top goalscorers ===
Rank	Player	Club(s)	Year(s)	U-17 goals
1	Abel Ruiz	Barcelona	2015–2017	25
2	Jonathan Soriano	Espanyol	2001–2003	18
3	Bojan Krkić	Barcelona	2006–2007	16
4	Paco Alcácer	Valencia	2009–2010	14
5	David Rodríguez	Atlético Madrid	2002–2003	13
6	Borja	Atlético Madrid	2008–2009	12
	Roberto Soldado	Real Madrid	2001–2003	12
8	Jaime Gavilán	Valencia	2001–2003	10
	Iker Bravo	Bayer Leverkusen	2021–2022	10
	Marc Guiu	Barcelona	2022–2023	10

Note: Club(s) represents the permanent clubs during the player's time in the Under-17s.

== Players ==
=== Current squad ===
Players born on or after 1 January 2009 are available for selection.

The following players were named in the squad for the friendly matches against Ukraine on 21 and 23 April 2026.

Caps and goals correct as of 23 April 2026, after the match against Ukraine.

No.	Pos.	Player	Date of birth (age)	Caps	Goals	Club
1	GK	Guille Ponce	9 March 2009 (age 17)	10	0	(Royal Spanish Football Federation) Real Madrid
13	GK	Darlington Osuchukwu	18 November 2009 (age 17)	4	0	(The Football Association) Manchester United
2	DF	Raúl Expósito	26 April 2009 (age 17)	11	0	(Royal Spanish Football Federation) Barcelona
3	DF	Jordi Pesquer	26 January 2009 (age 17)	13	2	(Royal Spanish Football Federation) Barcelona
4	DF	Mario Díaz	17 January 2009 (age 17)	11	1	(Royal Spanish Football Federation) Sevilla
5	DF	Sergi Mayans	30 January 2009 (age 17)	14	1	(Royal Spanish Football Federation) Barcelona
12	DF	Arnau Cases	17 May 2009 (age 17)	8	0	(Royal Spanish Football Federation) Espanyol
15	DF	Jorge Domínguez	21 December 2009 (age 16)	7	1	(Royal Spanish Football Federation) Atlético Madrid
18	DF	Mikel Urrestarazu	23 April 2009 (age 17)	7	2	(Royal Spanish Football Federation) Athletic Bilbao
23	DF	Iker Herrera	17 October 2009 (age 17)	4	0	(Royal Spanish Football Federation) Valencia
6	MF	Ian Mencía	26 March 2009 (age 17)	15	1	(Royal Spanish Football Federation) Atlético Madrid
8	MF	Mauro Valeiro	1 September 2009 (age 17)	6	0	(Royal Spanish Football Federation) Deportivo La Coruña
10	MF	Ebrima Tunkara	10 March 2010 (age 16)	14	6	(Royal Spanish Football Federation) Barcelona
14	MF	Holmes Zamorano	8 August 2009 (age 17)	13	1	(Royal Spanish Football Federation) Girona
16	MF	Cherif Fofana	20 November 2009 (age 17)	4	0	(Royal Spanish Football Federation) Real Madrid
17	MF	Marc Martinez	7 April 2009 (age 17)	8	1	(Royal Spanish Football Federation) Valencia
19	MF	Roberto Tomás	20 February 2009 (age 17)	15	8	(Royal Spanish Football Federation) Barcelona
21	MF	Santiago del Pino	6 June 2009 (age 17)	10	4	(Royal Spanish Football Federation) Real Madrid
7	FW	Owen Mira	18 April 2009 (age 17)	2	0	(Royal Spanish Football Federation) Girona
9	FW	Enzo Alves	16 September 2009 (age 17)	16	7	(Royal Spanish Football Federation) Real Madrid
11	FW	Abdou Kemo Badji	5 March 2009 (age 17)	7	1	(Royal Spanish Football Federation) Atlético Madrid
20	FW	Christian Imga	17 February 2009 (age 17)	11	5	(Royal Spanish Football Federation) Athletic Bilbao
22	FW	Byron Mendoza	20 February 2009 (age 17)	7	1	(Royal Spanish Football Federation) Barcelona

=== Recent call-ups ===
The following players have also been called up to the squad within the last twelve months and remain eligible for selection.

Pos.	Player	Date of birth (age)	Caps	Goals	Club	Latest call-up
MF	Marco Company	24 January 2009 (age 17)	2	0	(Spain) Real Madrid	v. Denmark, 19 February 2025
FW	Jaric Prat	10 February 2009 (age 17)	2	0	(England) Chelsea	v. Italy, 23 January 2025
^{INJ} Player withdrew from the squad due to an injury

== Former squads ==
- 2023 FIFA U-17 World Championship squads - Spain
- 2019 FIFA U-17 World Championship squads - Spain
- 2017 FIFA U-17 World Championship squads - Spain
- 2009 FIFA U-17 World Championship squads - Spain
- 2007 FIFA U-17 World Championship squads - Spain
- 2003 FIFA U-17 World Championship squads - Spain
- 2001 FIFA U-17 World Championship squads - Spain
- 1999 FIFA U-17 World Championship squads - Spain
- 1997 FIFA U-17 World Championship squads - Spain
- 1995 FIFA U-17 World Championship squads - Spain
- 1991 FIFA U-17 World Championship squads - Spain
- 2026 UEFA European Under-17 Championship squads - Spain
- 2024 UEFA European Under-17 Championship squads - Spain
- 2023 UEFA European Under-17 Championship squads - Spain
- 2022 UEFA European Under-17 Championship squads - Spain
- 2019 UEFA European Under-17 Championship squads - Spain
- 2018 UEFA European Under-17 Championship squads - Spain
- 2017 UEFA European Under-17 Championship squads - Spain
- 2016 UEFA European Under-17 Championship squads - Spain
- 2015 UEFA European Under-17 Championship squads - Spain
- 2010 UEFA European Under-17 Championship squads - Spain
- 2009 UEFA European Under-17 Championship squads - Spain
- 2008 UEFA European Under-17 Championship squads - Spain
- 2007 UEFA European Under-17 Championship squads - Spain
- 2006 UEFA European Under-17 Championship squads - Spain
- 2004 UEFA European Under-17 Championship squads - Spain
- 2003 UEFA European Under-17 Championship squads - Spain
- 2002 UEFA European Under-17 Championship squads - Spain

== See also ==
- Spain national football team
- Spain national under-23 football team
- Spain national under-21 football team
- Spain national under-20 football team
- Spain national under-19 football team
- Spain national under-18 football team
- Spain national under-16 football team
- Spain national under-15 football team
- Spain national youth football team

== Head-to-head record ==
The following table shows Spain's head-to-head record in the FIFA U-17 World Cup.

Opponent	Pld	W	D	L	GF	GA	GD	Win %
Argentina	5	2	2	1	7	7	+0	40.00
Australia	1	0	1	0	2	2	+0	0.00
Brazil	2	0	0	2	1	3	−2	0.00
Burkina Faso	2	1	0	1	4	2	+2	50.00
Canada	1	1	0	0	2	0	+2	100.00
Cameroon	1	1	0	0	2	0	+2	100.00
Colombia	1	1	0	0	1	0	+1	100.00
Cuba	1	1	0	0	7	2	+5	100.00
Egypt	1	1	0	0	2	1	+1	100.00
England	1	0	0	1	2	5	−3	0.00
France	3	1	1	1	4	8	−4	33.33
Germany	3	2	0	1	5	3	+2	66.67
Ghana	5	1	2	2	5	6	−1	20.00
Honduras	1	1	0	0	4	2	+2	100.00
Iran	1	1	0	0	3	1	+2	100.00
Japan	1	1	0	0	2	1	+1	100.00
Malawi	1	1	0	0	4	1	+3	100.00
Mali	3	3	0	0	5	1	+4	100.00
Mexico	2	1	0	1	3	3	+0	50.00
New Zealand	1	1	0	0	13	0	+13	100.00
Niger	1	1	0	0	4	0	+4	100.00
Nigeria	3	0	1	2	2	5	−3	0.00
North Korea	2	2	0	0	5	0	+5	100.00
Oman	1	1	0	0	2	1	+1	100.00
Portugal	1	1	0	0	5	2	+3	100.00
Qatar	1	1	0	0	1	0	+1	100.00
Senegal	1	1	0	0	2	1	+1	100.00
Sierra Leone	1	0	1	0	3	3	+0	0.00
South Korea	1	1	0	0	3	2	+1	100.00
Syria	1	1	0	0	2	1	+1	100.00
Tajikistan	1	1	0	0	5	1	+4	100.00
Thailand	1	1	0	0	6	0	+6	100.00
United Arab Emirates	1	1	0	0	3	1	+2	100.00
United States	2	2	0	0	4	1	+3	100.00
Uruguay	2	1	1	0	4	3	+1	50.00
Uzbekistan	1	0	1	0	2	2	+0	0.00
Total	58	36	10	12	131	71	+60	62.07
