= Cor Gillis =

Belgian footballer

Personal information
- Date of birth: 31 March 1989 (age 37)
- Place of birth: Anderlecht, Belgium
- Height: 1.90 m (6 ft 3 in)
- Position: Centre back

Team information
- Current team: KVK Ninove

Youth career
- –2008: Anderlecht

Senior career*
Years	Team	Apps	(Gls)
2007–2008	Anderlecht	0	(0)
2008–2009	KV Mechelen	0	(0)
2009–2011	Tubize	46	(0)
2011–2012	FCV Dender EH	34	(2)
2012–2014	MVV Maastricht	26	(0)
2014	FCV Dender EH	10	(0)
2014–2015	Heist	24	(1)
2015–2016	Eendracht Aalst	10	(1)
2016–2017	Sint-Eloois-Winkel	0	(0)
2017–2018	FC Knokke	6	(0)
2018–	KVK Ninove	0	(0)

International career
2006–2007	Belgium U-17	25	(0)
2008–2010	Belgium U-20	2	(0)
- * Club domestic league appearances and goals as of 9 October 2018

Cor Gillis (Born on the 31st of March in 1989) is a Belgian association football player who currently plays for KVK Ninove.

== Career ==
Coming from the Anderlecht youth squad, Cor Gillis started his professional career in the 2006–2007 season for the Belgian Champions.

He had suffered an injury in his debut for the team and had to return in the next season with only 1 cap.

In total, he has played approximately 1900 minutes for the Belgian Champs in the Belgian league and was featured prominently in the UEFA Cup.

Gillis made a substitute appearance of 1 minute against Bayern in the UEFA Cup last year.

In 2008, Cor didn't even have a contract at Anderlecht; he was there simply as a youth player who sometimes trained with the first squad, although he was a member of their reserve team. He was hoping for some playing minutes in the Belgian cup, but never played as Anderlecht had bought a new defender.

Then went from R.S.C. Anderlecht to K.V. Mechelen on the 27th of January 2009.

== International ==
The 2007–2008 season saw him make more appearances with Anderlecht and make his way into the Belgian U-17s (Now in the Belgian U-20s). He later made another 9 appearances, gaining 14 caps in the 2007–2008 season.

In the 2023–2024 season, he had made another 10 caps, bringing his total appearances to a total over 25.

Cor Gillis served as captain of the Belgian U-17 team and was regarded as a promising prospect. In later years, other Belgian players received greater attention.
