= 2024 UEFA European Under-17 Championship qualification =

Tournament details
- Dates: Qualifying round: 27 September – 21 November 2023; Elite round: 6 – 26 March 2024
- Teams: 53 (from 1 confederation)

Tournament statistics
- Matches played: 123
- Goals scored: 401 (3.26 per match)
- Top scorer(s): (Spain) Adrian Arnucio (5 goals)

The 2024 UEFA European Under-17 Championship qualification was a men's under-17 national football team competition that determined the 15 teams joining the automatically qualified hosts Cyprus in the 2024 UEFA European Under-17 Championship final tournament. Players born on or after 1 January 2007 were eligible to participate.

Russia were excluded from the tournament due to the ongoing invasion of Ukraine. Therefore, excluding hosts Cyprus, 53 teams entered this qualification competition, which consists of a qualifying round played in September–November 2023, followed by an elite round played in March 2024.

== Format ==
The qualifying competition consisted of the following two rounds:

- Qualifying round: Apart from Netherlands, which received a bye to the elite round as the team with the highest seeding coefficient, the remaining 52 teams were drawn into 13 groups of four teams. Each group was played in a single round-robin format at one of the teams selected as hosts after the draw. The 13 group winners, the 13 runners-up, and the five third-placed teams with the best record against the first and second-placed teams in their group advanced to the elite round.
- Elite round: The 32 teams were drawn into eight groups of four teams. Each group was played in single round-robin format at one of the teams selected as hosts after the draw. The eight group winners and the seven runners-up with the best record against all teams in their group qualified for the final tournament.

The schedule of each group was as follows, with two rest days between each matchday (Regulations Article 20.04):

Group schedule
Matchday	Matches
Matchday 1	1 v 4, 3 v 2
Matchday 2	1 v 3, 2 v 4
Matchday 3	2 v 1, 4 v 3

=== Tiebreakers ===
In the qualifying round and elite round, teams were ranked according to points (3 points for a win, 1 point for a draw, 0 points for a loss), and if tied on points, the following tiebreaking criteria were applied, in the order given, to determine the rankings (Regulations Articles 14.01 and 14.02):

1. Points in head-to-head matches among tied teams;
2. Goal difference in head-to-head matches among tied teams;
3. Goals scored in head-to-head matches among tied teams;
4. If more than two teams are tied, and after applying all head-to-head criteria above, a subset of teams are still tied, all head-to-head criteria above are reapplied exclusively to this subset of teams;
5. Goal difference in all group matches;
6. Goals scored in all group matches;
7. Penalty shoot-out if only two teams had the same number of points, and they met in the last round of the group and were tied after applying all criteria above (not used if more than two teams had the same number of points, or if their rankings were not relevant for qualification for the next stage);
8. Disciplinary points (red card = 3 points, yellow card = 1 point, expulsion for two yellow cards in one match = 3 points);
9. UEFA coefficient ranking for the qualifying round draw;
10. Drawing of lots.

To determine the four best third-placed teams from the qualifying round, the results against the teams in fourth place were discarded. The following criteria were applied (Regulations Articles 15.01 and 15.03):

1. Points;
2. Goal difference;
3. Goals scored;
4. Disciplinary points (total 3 matches);
5. UEFA coefficient ranking for the qualifying round draw;
6. Drawing of lots.

To determine the seven best runners-up from the elite round, all results were considered. The same criteria as above were applied (Regulations Articles 15.02 and 15.03).

== Qualifying round ==
=== Draw ===
The draw for the qualifying round was held on 8 December 2022 at the UEFA headquarters in Nyon, Switzerland.

The teams were seeded according to their coefficient ranking, calculated based on the following:

- 2017 UEFA European Under-17 Championship final tournament and qualifying competition (qualifying round and elite round)
- 2018 UEFA European Under-17 Championship final tournament and qualifying competition (qualifying round and elite round)
- 2019 UEFA European Under-17 Championship final tournament and qualifying competition (qualifying round and elite round)
- 2022 UEFA European Under-17 Championship final tournament and qualifying competition (qualifying round and elite round)

Each group contained one team from Pot A, one team from Pot B, one team from Pot C, and one team from Pot D. Based on the decisions taken by the UEFA Emergency Panel, the following pairs of teams could not be drawn in the same group: Spain and Gibraltar, Belarus and Ukraine, Kosovo and Serbia, Kosovo and Bosnia & Herzegovina.

Final tournament hosts: Team / Coeff. / Rank; **Cyprus** / 6.500 / —	Bye to elite round: Team / Coeff. / Rank; Netherlands / 30.111 / 1

Teams entering qualifying round

Pot A
Team	Coeff.	Rank
Spain	25.778	2
Italy	24.778	3
France	23.167	4
England	20.233	5
Germany	19.500	6
Portugal	18.500	7
Belgium	17.444	8
Republic of Ireland	16.333	9
Hungary	16.056	10
Serbia	15.611	11
Sweden	14.167	12
Turkey	13.778	13
Denmark	12.333	14

Pot B
Team	Coeff.	Rank
Scotland	12.222	15
Israel	12.000	16
**Norway**	11.722	17
**Switzerland**	11.444	18
**Czech Republic**	11.222	19
**Slovenia**	10.111	20
**Greece**	10.889	21
**Bosnia and Herzegovina**	10.833	22
**Ukraine**	10.722	23
**Poland**	10.667	24
**Austria**	9.556	25
**Slovakia**	9.167	26
**Croatia**	8.667	27

Pot C
Team	Coeff.	Rank
**Finland**	8.500	28
Iceland	6.500	29
**Belarus**	6.500	30
**Bulgaria**	5.556	31
North Macedonia	5.500	32
**Romania**	5.000	33
**Georgia**	4.833	34
**Northern Ireland**	4.167	35
Kosovo	4.000	36
**Wales**	4.000	37
Montenegro	4.000	38
Luxembourg	3.917	39
Latvia	3.833	40

Pot D
Team	Coeff.	Rank
Estonia	3.333	41
Faroe Islands	2.889	42
Albania	2.333	43
Kazakhstan	2.333	44
Azerbaijan	2.000	45
Armenia	1.667	46
Andorra	1.333	47
Lithuania	1.333	48
Moldova	0.667	49
Malta	0.000	50
Gibraltar	0.000	51
Liechtenstein	0.000	52
San Marino	0.000	53

Notes

- Teams marked in **bold** have qualified for the final tournament.

=== Groups ===
The qualifying round was played in September, October, and November 2023.

Times up to 29 October 2023 are CEST (UTC+2), thereafter times are CET (UTC+1), as listed by UEFA (local times, if different, are in parentheses).

==== Group 1 ====
Pos	Team	Pld	W	D	L	GF	GA	GD	Pts	Qualification
1	Austria	3	2	1	0	5	3	+2	**7**	Elite round
2	Georgia (H)	3	1	1	1	4	4	0	**4 (Note: Ranked on head-to-head points: Georgia: 3, Denmark: 0)**	Elite round
3	Denmark	3	1	1	1	7	5	+2	**4**	Elite round
4	Lithuania	3	0	1	2	2	6	−4	**1**	

Source: UEFA
Rules for classification: Tiebreakers
(H) Hosts
Notes:
11 October 2023
13:00

Denmark	4–1	Lithuania
Moalem 17'; Obi 17'; Hyseni 31'; Abildgaard 90+4' (pen.)	Report	Garbaliaukas 13' (pen.)

Tskaltubo Technical Center, Tsqaltubo
Attendance: 50
Referee: Erkan Özdamar (Turkey)
11 October 2023
15:00

Georgia	1–2	Austria
Gvasalia 59'	Report	Adejenughure 14', 87'

Ramaz Shengelia Stadium, Kutaisi
Attendance: 846
Referee: Patrik Kolarić (Croatia)

14 October 2023
13:00

Austria	1–0	Lithuania
Riegel 90+1'	Report

Tskaltubo Technical Center, Tsqaltubo
Attendance: 50
Referee: Patrik Kolarić (Croatia)
14 October 2023
15:00

Denmark	1–2	Georgia
Hansen 56'	Report	Gustafsen 35' (o.g.); Elisashvili 45+2'

Ramaz Shengelia Stadium, Kutaisi
Attendance: 935
Referee: Jamie Robinson (Northern Ireland)

17 October 2023
15:00

Austria	2–2	Denmark
Moizi 61'; Music 75'	Report	Hansen 6'; Obi 45'

Tskaltubo Technical Center, Tsqaltubo
Attendance: 96
Referee: Erkan Özdamar (Turkey)
17 October 2023
15:00

Lithuania	1–1	Georgia
Zdanovič 85'	Report	Danelia 5'

Ramaz Shengelia Stadium, Kutaisi
Attendance: 644
Referee: Jamie Robinson (Northern Ireland)

==== Group 2 ====
Pos	Team	Pld	W	D	L	GF	GA	GD	Pts	Qualification
1	Poland	3	3	0	0	8	1	+7	**9**	Elite round
2	Sweden	3	2	0	1	6	4	+2	**6**	Elite round
3	Latvia	3	1	0	2	3	5	−2	**3**	
4	Moldova (H)	3	0	0	3	2	9	−7	**0**	

Source: UEFA
Rules for classification: Tiebreakers
(H) Hosts
27 September 2023
15:00

Sweden	3–2	Moldova
Kusi-Asare 17', 40', 61'	Report	Caragheorgi 4'; Efros 51'

Zimbru Stadium, Chișinău
Attendance: 1235
Referee: Tim Marshall (Northern Ireland)
27 September 2023
15:00

Latvia	0–3	Poland
	Report	Pļavinš 40' (o.g.); Potulski 45+2'; Izunwanne 48'

CSR Orhei, Orhei
Attendance: 50
Referee: Georgi Davidov (Bulgaria)

30 September 2023
15:00

Sweden	2–0	Latvia
Staykov 72'; Joksts 81' (o.g.)	Report

CSR Orhei, Orhei
Attendance: 50
Referee: Luka Bilbija (Bosnia and Herzegovina)
30 September 2023
15:00

Poland	3–0	Moldova
Adkonis 8', 38' (pen.), 58' (pen.)	Report

Zimbru Stadium, Chișinău
Attendance: 854
Referee: Georgi Davidov (Bulgaria)

3 October 2023
15:00

Poland	2–1	Sweden
Pietuszewski 81'; Jasiak 86'	Report	Jönsson 27' (pen.)

CSR Orhei, Orhei
Attendance: 60
Referee: Tim Marshall (Northern Ireland)
3 October 2023
15:00

Moldova	0–3	Latvia
	Report	Sprukts 45+2' (pen.), 53'; Poskrjobiševs 86'

Zimbru Stadium, Chișinău
Attendance: 873
Referee: Luka Bilbija (Bosnia and Herzegovina)

==== Group 3 ====
Pos	Team	Pld	W	D	L	GF	GA	GD	Pts	Qualification
1	Germany	3	2	1	0	8	1	+7	**7**	Elite round
2	Finland	3	1	2	0	6	3	+3	**5**	Elite round
3	Ukraine	3	1	1	1	9	3	+6	**4**	Elite round
4	Liechtenstein (H)	3	0	0	3	0	16	−16	**0**	

Source: UEFA
Rules for classification: Tiebreakers
(H) Hosts
15 October 2023
12:00

Finland	2–2	Ukraine
Siltanen 70'; Mero 76'	Report	Bondar 67'; Kangasniemi 87' (o.g.)

Sportanlage Blumenau, Triesen
Referee: David Dickinson (Scotland)
15 October 2023
16:30

Germany	6–0	Liechtenstein
Poller 31'; Onyeka 44', 84', 90'; Izekor 56'; Stange 75'	Report

Sportanlage Blumenau, Triesen
Attendance: 450
Referee: Radoslav Gidzhenov (Bulgaria)

18 October 2023
12:00

Germany	1–1	Finland
Husser 66'	Report	Daldum 83'

Sportanlage Blumenau, Triesen
Attendance: 150
Referee: Martin Dohál (Slovakia)
18 October 2023
16:30

Ukraine	7–0	Liechtenstein
Stepanov 5', 21', 57'; Bohdanov 15'; Drahan 45+2'; Harmash 65'; Ukhan 69'	Report

Sportanlage Blumenau, Triesen
Attendance: 350
Referee: David Dickinson (Scotland)

21 October 2023
12:00

Ukraine	0–1	Germany
	Report	Izekor 53'

Sportanlage Blumenau, Triesen
Attendance: 100
Referee: Radoslav Gidzhenov (Bulgaria)
21 October 2023
16:30

Liechtenstein	0–3	Finland
	Report	Sabwele 53'; Kirilov 63'; Koukkumäki 82'

Sportanlage Blumenau, Triesen
Attendance: 150
Referee: Martin Dohál (Slovakia)

==== Group 4 ====
Pos	Team	Pld	W	D	L	GF	GA	GD	Pts	Qualification
1	Serbia (H)	3	2	1	0	10	3	+7	**7**	Elite round
2	Slovenia	3	1	2	0	6	3	+3	**5**	Elite round
3	Luxembourg	3	0	2	1	2	5	−3	**2**	
4	Azerbaijan	3	0	1	2	2	9	−7	**1**	

Source: UEFA
Rules for classification: Tiebreakers
(H) Hosts
21 October 2023
12:00

Luxembourg	1–1	Slovenia
Melo Co 73'	Report	Durmiši 88'

Sports Center of FA of Serbia, Stara Pazova
Attendance: 50
Referee: Jovan Kachevski (North Macedonia)
21 October 2023
17:00

Serbia	5–1	Azerbaijan
Ranković 4'; Mladenović 26', 29'; Kostić 59' (pen.); Bajramović 87'	Report	Bubanja 11' (o.g.)

Sports Center of FA of Serbia, Stara Pazova
Attendance: 105
Referee: Joni Hyytiä (Finland)

24 October 2023
12:00

Slovenia	3–0	Azerbaijan
Aćimović 24'; Pejičić 37'; Hocevar 61'	Report

Sports Center of FA of Serbia, Stara Pazova
Attendance: 50
Referee: Jovan Kachevski (North Macedonia)
24 October 2023
17:00

Serbia	3–0	Luxembourg
Vasilić 33'; Kostić 37'; Bajramović 86'	Report

Sports Center of FA of Serbia, Stara Pazova
Attendance: 150
Referee: Oleksii Derevinskyi (Ukraine)

27 October 2023
14:00

Slovenia	2–2	Serbia
Pejičić 20'; Šunta 90+5'	Report	Đorđević 3'; Kostić 82' (pen.)

Sports Center of FA of Serbia, Stara Pazova
Attendance: 117
Referee: Oleksii Derevinskyi (Ukraine)
27 October 2023
14:00

Azerbaijan	1–1	Luxembourg
Ahmadov 51'	Report	Brites 15'

Sports Center of FA of Serbia, Stara Pazova
Attendance: 50
Referee: Joni Hyytiä (Finland)

==== Group 5 ====
Pos	Team	Pld	W	D	L	GF	GA	GD	Pts	Qualification
1	Portugal (H)	3	3	0	0	11	1	+10	**9**	Elite round
2	Czech Republic	3	2	0	1	10	3	+7	**6**	Elite round
3	Albania	3	1	0	2	3	9	−6	**3**	
4	Montenegro	3	0	0	3	1	12	−11	**0**	

Source: UEFA
Rules for classification: Tiebreakers
(H) Hosts
15 November 2023
14:00

Montenegro	0–4	Czech Republic
	Report	Višňa 16'; Řeháček 63'; Belžík 86'; Nechvátal 90+1'

Estádio Papa Francisco, Fátima
Referee: Viktor Kopiievskyi (Ukraine)
15 November 2023
18:00

Portugal	3–0	Albania
Felicíssimo 34'; Rui Silva 68'; Mota 70'	Report

Rio Maior Municipal Stadium, Rio Maior
Referee: Sayat Karabayev (Kazakhstan)

18 November 2023
14:00

Czech Republic	6–1	Albania
Kolářík 13', 60'; Poturnay 30'; Slončík 40'; Moudrý 44'; Nela 90+1' (o.g.)	Report	Gici 83'

Estádio Papa Francisco, Fátima
18 November 2023
16:00

Portugal	6–1	Montenegro
Varela 6'; Silva 17', 27'; Trovisco 19'; Vieira 44'; Santos 45+1'	Report	Kostić 47'

Campo da Mata, Caldas da Rainha
Referee: Oliver Reitala (Finland)

21 November 2023
17:00

Czech Republic	0–2	Portugal
	Report	Silva 31'; Meireles 82'

Estádio Dr. Magalhães Pessoa, Leiria
Referee: Viktor Kopiievskyi (Ukraine)
21 November 2023
17:00

Albania	2–0	Montenegro
Gecaj 19'; Gjyla 71'	Report

Estádio Municipal da Marinha Grande, Marinha Grande
Referee: Oliver Reitala (Finland)

==== Group 6 ====
Pos	Team	Pld	W	D	L	GF	GA	GD	Pts	Qualification
1	France	3	1	2	0	5	1	+4	**5**	Elite round
2	Romania (H)	3	1	2	0	4	1	+3	**5**	Elite round
3	Norway	3	0	3	0	2	2	0	**3**	Elite round
4	Estonia	3	0	1	2	2	9	−7	**1**	

Source: UEFA
Rules for classification: Tiebreakers
(H) Hosts
15 November 2023
11:00

France	4–0	Estonia
Thebault 21'; Messi Tanfouri 32'; Sternal 48'; Camara 62'	Report

Stadionul Clinceni, Clinceni
Referee: Menelaos Antoniou (Cyprus)
15 November 2023
11:00

Romania	0–0	Norway
	Report

Football Centre FRF, Buftea
Referee: Igor Stojchevski (North Macedonia)

18 November 2023
11:00

France	1–1	Romania
Messi Tanfouri 65'	Report	Popa 4'

Football Centre FRF, Buftea
Referee: Jasper Vergoote (Belgium)
18 November 2023
11:00

Norway	2–2	Estonia
Nilsen-Modebe 7'; Eikrem 75'	Report	Kristal 56'; Limberg 90+6'

Stadionul Anghel Iordănescu, Voluntari
Referee: Menelaos Antoniou (Cyprus)

21 November 2023
10:00

Norway	0–0	France
	Report

Stadionul Arsenal, Tunari
Referee: Jasper Vergoote (Belgium)
21 November 2023
10:00

Estonia	0–3	Romania
	Report	Oargă 23'; Toma 40'; Popa 90+9' (pen.)

Football Centre FRF, Buftea
Referee: Igor Stojchevski (North Macedonia)

==== Group 7 ====
Pos	Team	Pld	W	D	L	GF	GA	GD	Pts	Qualification
1	Turkey (H)	3	2	1	0	4	0	+4	**7**	Elite round
2	Belarus	3	1	1	1	3	2	+1	**4**	Elite round
3	Scotland	3	1	0	2	3	6	−3	**3**	
4	Kazakhstan	3	0	2	1	0	2	−2	**2**	

Source: UEFA
Rules for classification: Tiebreakers
(H) Hosts
21 October 2023
12:00

Belarus	3–1	Scotland
Dziarzhynski 45+3'; Halliwell 61' (o.g.); Ausiannikau 90+4'	Report	Adamson 78'

Arslan Zeki Demirci Sports Complex, Manavgat
Attendance: 35
Referee: Mervan Bejtullahu (Kosovo)
21 October 2023
15:00

Turkey	0–0	Kazakhstan
	Report

Arslan Zeki Demirci Sports Complex, Manavgat
Attendance: 69
Referee: Dominik Stary (Czech Republic)

24 October 2023
12:00

Scotland	2–0	Kazakhstan
Adamson 21'; Stirton 73'	Report

Arslan Zeki Demirci Sports Complex, Manavgat
Attendance: 37
Referee: Mervan Bejtullahu (Kosovo)
24 October 2023
15:00

Turkey	1–0	Belarus
Hekimoğlu 90+4'	Report

Arslan Zeki Demirci Sports Complex, Manavgat
Attendance: 73
Referee: Sivert Øksnes Amland (Norway)

27 October 2023
15:00

Scotland	0–3	Turkey
	Report	Hekimoğlu 62'; Özkan 82', 87'

Arslan Zeki Demirci Sports Complex, Manavgat
Attendance: 86
Referee: Dominik Stary (Czech Republic)
27 October 2023
15:00

Kazakhstan	0–0	Belarus
	Report

Arslan Zeki Demirci Sports Complex, Manavgat
Attendance: 11
Referee: Sivert Øksnes Amland (Norway)

==== Group 8 ====
Pos	Team	Pld	W	D	L	GF	GA	GD	Pts	Qualification
1	Spain	3	3	0	0	17	1	+16	**9**	Elite round
2	Slovakia	3	2	0	1	6	5	+1	**6**	Elite round
3	Malta (H)	3	0	1	2	1	9	−8	**1**	
4	North Macedonia	3	0	1	2	1	10	−9	**1**	

Source: UEFA
Rules for classification: Tiebreakers
(H) Hosts
25 October 2023
10:30

Spain	7–0	Malta
A. Casino 13' (pen.); Arnucio 21', 28', 63'; Reyes López 29'; Cortes 52'; G. Casino 70'	Report

Centenary Stadium, Ta' Qali
Attendance: 214
Referee: Antoni Bandić (Bosnia and Herzegovina)
25 October 2023
14:30

North Macedonia	0–4	Slovakia
	Report	Valko 6'; Vlna 34', 64'; Balog 41'

Centenary Stadium, Ta' Qali
Attendance: 57
Referee: Marek Radina (Czech Republic)

28 October 2023
10:30

Spain	5–0	North Macedonia
Puente 5', 19'; P. Duran 8'; G. Casino 32'; F. Duran 58'	Report

Centenary Stadium, Ta' Qali
Attendance: 47
Referee: Lothar D'hondt (Belgium)
28 October 2023
14:30

Slovakia	1–0	Malta
Trello 50'	Report

Centenary Stadium, Ta' Qali
Attendance: 183
Referee: Antoni Bandić (Bosnia and Herzegovina)

31 October 2023
11:00

Malta	1–1	North Macedonia
Melillo 90+1'	Report	Etoski 38'

Centenary Stadium, Ta' Qali
Attendance: 198
Referee: Marek Radina (Czech Republic)
31 October 2023
14:30

Slovakia	1–5	Spain
Kováčik 28'	Report	P. Duran 9' (pen.), 45+1'; Arnucio 19', 50'; Reyes López 33'

Centenary Stadium, Ta' Qali
Attendance: 42
Referee: Lothar D'hondt (Belgium)

==== Group 9 ====
Pos	Team	Pld	W	D	L	GF	GA	GD	Pts	Qualification
1	England	3	3	0	0	18	1	+17	**9**	Elite round
2	Croatia (H)	3	2	0	1	11	5	+6	**6**	Elite round
3	Kosovo	3	1	0	2	3	10	−7	**3**	
4	Faroe Islands	3	0	0	3	1	17	−16	**0**	

Source: UEFA
Rules for classification: Tiebreakers
(H) Hosts
3 November 2023
12:00

England	8–0	Faroe Islands
Fletcher 12'; Moore 24'; Ólavsson 44' (o.g.); Mheuka 47'; Derry 54'; Mukasa 70', 77'; Dunbar-Mcdonald 73'	Report

Ivan Laljak-Ivić Stadium, Zaprešić
Attendance: 50
Referee: Edgars Maļcevs (Latvia)
3 November 2023
13:00

Kosovo	0–4	Croatia
	Report	Čović 44'; Ćutuk 48'; Zebić 62'; Barić 80'

Stadion Branko Čavlović-Čavlek, Karlovac
Referee: Mohammad Usman Aslam (Norway)

6 November 2023
12:00

England	5–0	Kosovo
Derry 16', 24'; Olusesi 46', 63'; Fletcher 73'	Report

Ivan Laljak-Ivić Stadium, Zaprešić
Attendance: 100
Referee: Alessandro Dudic (Switzerland)
6 November 2023
13:00

Croatia	6–0	Faroe Islands
Matić 13', 90'; Durdov 60'; Čović 70'; Kostelac 81'; Ahmeti 88'	Report

Stadion Branko Čavlović-Čavlek, Karlovac
Attendance: 250
Referee: Mohammad Usman Aslam (Norway)

9 November 2023
13:00

Croatia	1–5	England
Ćutuk 52'	Report	Moore 15', 54', 79'; Mheuka 30'; Derry 69'

Stadion Branko Čavlović-Čavlek, Karlovac
Attendance: 400
Referee: Edgars Maļcevs (Latvia)
9 November 2023
13:00

Faroe Islands	1–3	Kosovo
Benjaminsen 45+5'	Report	Bekolli 8'; Jerlija 45+6', 60'

Ivan Laljak-Ivić Stadium, Zaprešić
Attendance: 100
Referee: Alessandro Dudic (Switzerland)

==== Group 10 ====
Pos	Team	Pld	W	D	L	GF	GA	GD	Pts	Qualification
1	Switzerland	3	2	1	0	8	0	+8	**7**	Elite round
2	Republic of Ireland (H)	3	1	2	0	4	0	+4	**5**	Elite round
3	Iceland	3	1	1	1	7	4	+3	**4**	
4	Armenia	3	0	0	3	1	16	−15	**0**	

Source: UEFA
Rules for classification: Tiebreakers
(H) Hosts
11 October 2023
15:00

Iceland	0–3	Switzerland
	Report	Guido 15'; Tairi 52'; Cassese 70'

Mardyke (UCC), Cork
Attendance: 100
Referee: Kyriakos Athanasiou (Cyprus)
11 October 2023
21:00

Republic of Ireland	4–0	Armenia
Melia 13', 87', 90+4' (pen.); Umeh 38'	Report

Carrig Park, Fermoy
Attendance: 1,100
Referee: Jakob Alexander Sundberg (Denmark)

14 October 2023
15:00

Switzerland	5–0	Armenia
Aguilar 15'; Cakolli 30', 74'; Kospo 54'; Cassese 75'	Report

Mardyke (UCC), Cork
Attendance: 88
Referee: Kyriakos Athanasiou (Cyprus)
14 October 2023
20:00

Republic of Ireland	0–0	Iceland
	Report

Turners Cross, Cork
Attendance: 362
Referee: Dario Bel (Croatia)

17 October 2023
13:00

Switzerland	0–0	Republic of Ireland
	Report

Turners Cross, Cork
Attendance: 278
Referee: Jakob Alexander Sundberg (Denmark)
17 October 2023
15:00

Armenia	1–7	Iceland
Harutyunyan 45+2'	Report	Johannesson 2', 27'; Arnarsson 29', 62', 88'; Johannessen 79' (pen.); Olsen 81'

Mardyke (UCC), Cork
Attendance: 25
Referee: Dario Bel (Croatia)

==== Group 11 ====
Pos	Team	Pld	W	D	L	GF	GA	GD	Pts	Qualification
1	Greece	3	3	0	0	6	1	+5	**9**	Elite round
2	Italy (H)	3	1	1	1	5	2	+3	**4**	Elite round
3	Northern Ireland	3	1	1	1	4	2	+2	**4**	Elite round
4	San Marino	3	0	0	3	0	10	−10	**0**	

Source: UEFA
Rules for classification: Tiebreakers
(H) Hosts
25 October 2023
12:00

Northern Ireland	0–2	Greece
	Report	Sulanjaku 51'; Mythou 67'

Stadio Germano Todoli, Cervia
Attendance: 70
Referee: Bulat Sariyev (Kazakhstan)
25 October 2023
15:00

Italy	4–0	San Marino
Mosconi 8'; Coletta 49'; Camarda 50'; Verde 90+4'	Report

Stadio Valentino Mazzola, Santarcangelo di Romagna
Attendance: 350
Referee: Ivo Torres (Luxembourg)

28 October 2023
12:00

Greece	2–0	San Marino
Dunga 38'; Karargyris 45+3'	Report

Stadio Germano Todoli, Cervia
Attendance: 150
Referee: Bulat Sariyev (Kazakhstan)
28 October 2023
15:00

Italy	0–0	Northern Ireland
	Report

Stadio Valentino Mazzola, Santarcangelo di Romagna
Attendance: 650
Referee: Elchin Masiyev (Azerbaijan)

31 October 2023
15:00

Greece	2–1	Italy
Darviras 13' (pen.); Kostoulas 45' (pen.)	Report	Maiorana 42' (pen.)

Tullo Morgagni, Forli
Attendance: 1,000
Referee: Elchin Masiyev (Azerbaijan)
31 October 2023
15:00

San Marino	0–4	Northern Ireland
	Report	Brannigan 14'; Burnside 30'; Haughey 47'; Graham 76'

Stadio Valentino Mazzola, Santarcangelo di Romagna
Attendance: 80
Referee: Ivo Torres (Luxembourg)

==== Group 12 ====
Pos	Team	Pld	W	D	L	GF	GA	GD	Pts	Qualification
1	Wales (H)	2	2	0	0	5	0	+5	**6**	Elite round
2	Belgium	2	1	0	1	4	1	+3	**3**	Elite round
3	Gibraltar	2	0	0	2	0	8	−8	**0**	
4	Israel	0	0	0	0	0	0	0	**0**	Withdrew

Source: UEFA
Rules for classification: Tiebreakers
(H) Hosts

Gibraltar initially withdrew from the group on 7 October 2023, citing safety concerns in light of the Gaza war. All matches were subsequently postponed by UEFA later that day. New dates and host nation (Wales) were announced later. Israel withdrew from qualification shortly before the re-arranged dates.

15 November 2023
15:00

Wales	Cancelled	Israel
	Report

Cardiff City Stadium, Cardiff
15 November 2023
18:00

Belgium	4–0	Gibraltar
Reumers 22'; Da Costa 30'; M. Diawara 90+1'; Engwanda-Ongena 90+5'	Report

Dragon Park, Newport
Referee: Roman Jitari (Moldova)

18 November 2023
15:00

Israel	Cancelled	Gibraltar
	Report

Dragon Park, Newport
18 November 2023
18:00

Belgium	0–1	Wales
	Report	Myles 90+1'

Cardiff International Sports Stadium, Cardiff
Referee: Jan Machálek (Czech Republic)

21 November 2023
15:00

Israel	Cancelled	Belgium
	Report

Dragon Park, Newport
21 November 2023
15:00

Gibraltar	0–4	Wales
	Report	Bostock 14'; Allen 49'; Jones 77'; Griffiths 89'

Dragon Park, Newport
Referee: Radoslav Gidzhenov (Bulgaria)

==== Group 13 ====
Pos	Team	Pld	W	D	L	GF	GA	GD	Pts	Qualification
1	Bulgaria	3	2	1	0	4	2	+2	**7**	Elite round
2	Hungary (H)	3	2	0	1	5	2	+3	**6**	Elite round
3	Bosnia and Herzegovina	3	1	1	1	5	4	+1	**4**	Elite round
4	Andorra	3	0	0	3	1	7	−6	**0**	

Source: UEFA
Rules for classification: Tiebreakers
(H) Hosts
25 October 2023
13:00

Bulgaria	1–1	Bosnia and Herzegovina
Gaote 6'	Report	Pejić 31'

BSC Stadium, Budaörs
Attendance: 60
Referee: David Munro (Scotland)
25 October 2023
16:00

Hungary	2–0	Andorra
Kugyela 41'; Egri 90+4'	Report

Globall Football Park, Telki
Attendance: 250
Referee: Stefan Ebner (Austria)

28 October 2023
13:00

Bosnia and Herzegovina	3–0	Andorra
Pejić 15'; Petrović 84'; Alajbegović 90+2' (pen.)	Report

BSC Stadium, Budaörs
Attendance: 60
Referee: David Munro (Scotland)
28 October 2023
16:00

Hungary	0–1	Bulgaria
	Report	Gigov 23'

Globall Football Park, Telki
Attendance: 240
Referee: Ashot Ghaltakhchyan (Armenia)

31 October 2023
16:00

Bosnia and Herzegovina	1–3	Hungary
Ignatkov 61'	Report	Mondovics 33', 47'; Barkóczi 78'

Globall Football Park, Telki
Attendance: 200
Referee: Stefan Ebner (Austria)
31 October 2023
16:00

Andorra	1–2	Bulgaria
De Lima 45+3'	Report	Polendakov 16' (pen.); Givedzhov 31'

BSC Stadium, Budaörs
Attendance: 27
Referee: Ashot Ghaltakhchyan (Armenia)

=== Ranking of third-placed teams ===
To determine the five best third-placed teams from the qualifying round which advanced to the elite round, only the results of the third-placed teams against the first and second-placed teams in their group were taken into account.

Pos	Grp	Team	Pld	W	D	L	GF	GA	GD	Pts	Qualification
1	6	Norway	2	0	2	0	0	0	0	2	Elite Round
2	1	Denmark	2	0	1	1	3	4	−1	1	Elite Round
3	3	Ukraine	2	0	1	1	2	3	−1	1	Elite Round
4	13	Bosnia and Herzegovina	2	0	1	1	2	4	−2	1	Elite Round
5	11	Northern Ireland	2	0	1	1	0	2	−2	1	Elite Round
6	4	Luxembourg	2	0	1	1	1	4	−3	1	
7	10	Iceland	2	0	1	1	0	3	−3	1	
8	7	Scotland	2	0	0	2	1	6	−5	0	
9	2	Latvia	2	0	0	2	0	5	−5	0	
10	5	Albania	2	0	0	2	1	9	−8	0	
11	8	Malta	2	0	0	2	0	8	−8	0 (Note: Ranked on disciplinary points: Malta: –3, Gibraltar: –4)	
12	12	Gibraltar	2	0	0	2	0	8	−8	0	
13	9	Kosovo	2	0	0	2	0	9	−9	0	

Source: UEFA
Rules for classification: 1) points; 2) goal difference; 3) goals scored; 4) disciplinary points; 5) coefficient; 6) drawing of lots.

== Elite round ==
=== Draw ===
The draw for the elite round was held on 7 December 2023 at the UEFA headquarters in Nyon, Switzerland.

The teams were seeded according to their results in the qualifying round. The Netherlands, which received a bye to the elite round, were automatically seeded into Pot A. Each group contained one team from Pot A, one team from Pot B, one team from Pot C, and one team from Pot D. Winners and runners-up from the same qualifying round group could not be drawn in the same group, but the best third-placed teams could be drawn in the same group as winners or runners-up from the same qualifying round group.

2023/24 qualifying round results

Pot A
Team	Pos.	Pts.	GD	GS	Coef.
Netherlands	Seeded	–	–	–	–
Spain	Group 8 winners	6	11	12	3.000
England	Group 9 winners	6	9	10	3.000
Portugal	Group 5 winners	6	5	5	3.000
Wales	Group 12 winners	6	5	5	3.000
Poland	Group 2 winners	6	4	5	3.000
Turkey	Group 7 winners	6	4	4	3.000
Greece	Group 11 winners	6	3	4	3.000

Pot B
Team	Pos.	Pts.	GD	GS	Coef.
Serbia	Group 4 winners	4	3	5	2.000
Switzerland	Group 10 winners	4	3	3	2.000
Austria	Group 1 winners	4	1	4	2.000
Bulgaria	Group 13 winners	4	1	2	2.000
Germany	Group 3 winners	4	1	2	2.000
France	Group 6 winners	2	0	1	1.000
Czech Republic	Group 5 runner-up	3	3	6	1.500
Belgium	Group 12 runner-up	3	3	4	1.500

2023/24 qualifying round results

Pot C
Team	Pos.	Pts.	GD	GS	Coef.
Hungary	Group 13 runner-up	3	1	3	1.500
Sweden	Group 2 runner-up	3	1	3	1.500
Belarus	Group 7 runner-up	3	1	3	1.500
Croatia	Group 9 runner-up	3	0	5	1.500
Georgia	Group 1 runner-up	3	0	3	1.500
Slovakia	Group 8 runner-up	3	−3	2	1.500
Slovenia	Group 4 runner-up	2	0	3	1.000
Finland	Group 3 runner-up	2	0	3	1.000

Pot D
Team	Pos.	Pts.	GD	GS	Coef.
Romania	Group 6 runner-up	2	0	1	1.000
Republic of Ireland	Group 10 runner-up	2	0	0	1.000
Italy	Group 11 runner-up	1	−1	1	0.500
Norway	Group 6 third-place	2	0	0	1.000
Denmark	Group 1 third-place	1	−1	3	0.500
Ukraine	Group 3 third-place	1	−1	2	0.500
Bosnia and Herzegovina	Group 13 third-place	1	−2	2	0.500
Northern Ireland	Group 11 third-place	1	−2	0	0.500

=== Group 1 ===
Pos	Team	Pld	W	D	L	GF	GA	GD	Pts	Promotion
1	France	3	3	0	0	9	4	+5	9	Qualified for the final tournament
2	England (H)	3	2	0	1	11	3	+8	6	Qualified for the final tournament
3	Northern Ireland	3	1	0	2	6	11	−5	3	
4	Hungary	3	0	0	3	2	10	−8	0	

Source: UEFA
Rules for classification: Qualification tiebreakers
(H) Hosts
20 March 2024
16:00

England	5–1	Northern Ireland
Mukasa 31', 89'; Nwaneri 63'; Dipepa 66', 69'	Report	Burnside 19'

St George's Park National Football Centre, Burton upon Trent
Referee: Danilo Nikolić (Serbia)
20 March 2024
21:00

Hungary	1–2	France
Mondovics 90+1'	Report	Kouakou 18', 70'

St George's Park National Football Centre, Burton upon Trent
Referee: Jacob Karlsen (Denmark)

23 March 2024
16:00

England	5–0	Hungary
Dipepa 9'; Rigg 27'; Nwaneri 56'; McFarlane 67'; Pál 80' (o.g.)	Report

St George's Park National Football Centre, Burton upon Trent
Referee: Martin Matoša (Slovenia)
23 March 2024
20:00

France	5–2	Northern Ireland
Meïté 32', 49'; Sternal 45+1'; Sellami 70'; Cabral 88'	Report	Stitt 16'; Graham 54'

St George's Park National Football Centre, Burton upon Trent
Referee: Jacob Karlsen (Denmark)

26 March 2024
20:00

France	2–1	England
Messi Tanfouri 18', 37' (pen.)	Report	Nwaneri 70'

St George's Park National Football Centre, Burton upon Trent
26 March 2024
20:00

Northern Ireland	3–1	Hungary
Brannigan 50'; Corrigan 78'; Graham 84'	Report	Mondovics 23'

St George's Park National Football Centre, Burton upon Trent

=== Group 2 ===
Pos	Team	Pld	W	D	L	GF	GA	GD	Pts	Promotion
1	Sweden	3	2	1	0	5	3	+2	7	Qualified for the final tournament
2	Wales	3	2	0	1	5	4	+1	6	Qualified for the final tournament
3	Romania (H)	3	0	2	1	2	3	−1	2	
4	Bulgaria	3	0	1	2	2	4	−2	1	

Source: UEFA
Rules for classification: Qualification tiebreakers
(H) Hosts
20 March 2024
11:00

Wales	2–1	Romania
Myles 24'; Bostock 56'	Report	Popa 72'

Central Stadium of the Romanian National Football Centre, Buftea
Referee: Michele Beltrano (San Marino)
20 March 2024
11:00

Sweden	2–1	Bulgaria
Antwi 59'; Andersson 90+1'	Report	Boychev 52'

Concordia Stadium, Chiajna
Referee: Florian Lata (Albania)

23 March 2024
11:00

Wales	1–2	Sweden
Kpakio 72'	Report	Isaksson 29'; Antwi 56'

Concordia Stadium, Chiajna
Referee: Bahattin Şimşek (Turkey)
23 March 2024
11:00

Bulgaria	0–0	Romania
	Report

Central Stadium of the Romanian National Football Centre, Buftea
Referee: Florian Lata (Albania)

26 March 2024
11:00

Bulgaria	1–2	Wales
Polendakov 89'	Report	Bostock 52'; Myles 74'

Stadionul Mogoșoaia, Mogoșoaia
Referee: Michele Beltrano (San Marino)
26 March 2024
11:00

Romania	1–1	Sweden
Petculescu 90'	Report	Bozicevic 85'

Central Stadium of the Romanian National Football Centre, Buftea
Referee: Bahattin Şimşek (Turkey)

=== Group 3 ===
Pos	Team	Pld	W	D	L	GF	GA	GD	Pts	Promotion
1	Italy	3	2	1	0	9	5	+4	7	Qualified for the final tournament
2	Belgium	3	1	1	1	6	7	−1	4 (Note: Head to head points: Belgium 3, Finland 0.)	
3	Finland (H)	3	1	1	1	3	3	0	4	
4	Netherlands	3	0	1	2	2	5	−3	1	

Source: UEFA
Rules for classification: Qualification tiebreakers
(H) Hosts
Notes:
20 March 2024
12:00

Netherlands	0–2	Italy
	Report	Ciardi 28' (pen.); Liberali 90+8'

Myyrmäen jalkapallostadion, Vantaa
Referee: Pavle Ilić (Serbia)
20 March 2024
17:30

Finland	0–1	Belgium
	Report	Van De Ven 13' (pen.)

Myyrmäen jalkapallostadion, Vantaa
Referee: Mihály Káprály (Hungary)

23 March 2024
17:30

Netherlands	0–1	Finland
	Report	Koukkumäki 1'

Myyrmäen jalkapallostadion, Vantaa
Referee: Alan Kijas (Austria)
23 March 2024
12:00

Belgium	3–5	Italy
Da Costa 1'; Furo 14'; Decresson 62'	Report	Liberali 20' (pen.); Konde 45' (o.g.); Camarda 50' (pen.), 57'; Ciardi 76' (pen.)

Myyrmäen jalkapallostadion, Vantaa
Referee: Pavle Ilić (Serbia)

26 March 2024
12:00

Belgium	2–2	Netherlands
Furo 29'; Bafdili 73' (pen.)	Report	Ünüvar 39', 71'

Mustapekka Areena, Helsinki
Referee: Mihály Káprály (Hungary)
26 March 2024
12:00

Italy	2–2	Finland
Kangasniemi 18' (o.g.); Camarda 90+1' (pen.)	Report	Kirilov 26' (pen.); Multala 56'

Myyrmäen jalkapallostadion, Vantaa
Referee: Alan Kijas (Austria)

=== Group 4 ===
Pos	Team	Pld	W	D	L	GF	GA	GD	Pts	Promotion
1	Ukraine	3	3	0	0	8	0	+8	9	Qualified for the final tournament
2	Slovakia	3	2	0	1	3	4	−1	6	Qualified for the final tournament
3	Switzerland	3	1	0	2	3	5	−2	3	
4	Greece (H)	3	0	0	3	0	5	−5	0	

Source: UEFA
Rules for classification: Qualification tiebreakers
(H) Hosts
6 March 2024
13:00

Slovakia	2–1	Switzerland
Pira 12'; Valko 78'	Report	Cakolli 38'

Pampeloponnisiako Stadium, Patras
Referee: Alejandro Muñiz Ruiz (Spain)
6 March 2024
14:00

Greece	0–2	Ukraine
	Report	Redushko 75'; Bohdanov 80' (pen.)

Kostas Davourlis Stadium, Patras
Referee: Damian Kos (Poland)

9 March 2024
13:00

Switzerland	0–3	Ukraine
	Report	Bohdanov 17'; Stepanov 24' (pen.); Bondar 63'

Pampeloponnisiako Stadium, Patras
Referee: Matthew MacDermid (Scotland)
9 March 2024
14:00

Greece	0–1	Slovakia
	Report	Lusale 85'

Kostas Davourlis Stadium, Patras
Referee: Damian Kos (Poland)

12 March 2024
14:00

Switzerland	2–0	Greece
Kabashi 6'; Rufener 60'	Report

Kostas Davourlis Stadium, Patras
Referee: Alejandro Muñiz Ruiz (Spain)
12 March 2024
14:00

Ukraine	3–0	Slovakia
Stepanov 41', 68'; Redushko 45+1'	Report

Pampeloponnisiako Stadium, Patras
Referee: Matthew MacDermid (Scotland)

=== Group 5 ===
Pos	Team	Pld	W	D	L	GF	GA	GD	Pts	Promotion
1	Portugal (H)	3	3	0	0	10	3	+7	9	Qualified for the final tournament
2	Croatia	3	1	1	1	8	6	+2	4	Qualified for the final tournament
3	Germany	3	1	1	1	7	6	+1	4	
4	Republic of Ireland	3	0	0	3	1	11	−10	0	

Source: UEFA
Rules for classification: Qualification tiebreakers
(H) Hosts
20 March 2024
17:00

Portugal	4–1	Republic of Ireland
Simões 16'; Silva 30', 52'; Mora 55'	Report	Melia 33' (pen.)

Cidade Desportiva do SC Braga, Braga
Referee: Marc Nagtegaal (Netherlands)
20 March 2024
12:00

Croatia	3–3	Germany
Ćutuk 5' (pen.), 56' (pen.); Vojvodić 34'	Report	Neumann 12', 20'; Onyeka 73' (pen.)

Estádio Municipal Manuela Machado, Viana do Castelo
Referee: Bence Csonka (Hungary)

23 March 2024
17:00

Portugal	3–0	Croatia
Silva 18'; Quenda 32'; Mora 62'	Report

Estádio do FC Vizela, Vizela
Referee: Kamal Umudlu (Azerbaijan)
23 March 2024
12:00

Germany	2–0	Republic of Ireland
Sauck 19'; Onyeka 36'	Report

Mun. Stadium Coutada, Arcos de Valdevez
Referee: Bence Csonka (Hungary)

26 March 2024
12:00

Germany	2–3	Portugal
Husser 49', 90'	Report	Quenda 42', 82'; Trovisco 78'

Estádio Municipal 22 de Junho, Vila Nova de Famalicão
Referee: Marc Nagtegaal (Netherlands)
26 March 2024
12:00

Republic of Ireland	0–5	Croatia
	Report	Ćutuk 34' (pen.), 85' (pen.); Zebić 45+1'; Marić 80'; Puljić 90+6'

Estádio Municipal Manuela Machado, Viana do Castelo
Referee: Kamal Umudlu (Azerbaijan)

=== Group 6 ===
Pos	Team	Pld	W	D	L	GF	GA	GD	Pts	Promotion
1	Denmark	3	2	1	0	8	0	+8	7	Qualified for the final tournament
2	Serbia	3	2	0	1	5	1	+4	6	Qualified for the final tournament
3	Georgia (H)	3	1	0	2	3	10	−7	3	
4	Turkey	3	0	1	2	1	6	−5	1	

Source: UEFA
Rules for classification: Qualification tiebreakers
(H) Hosts
20 March 2024
12:00

Turkey	0–0	Denmark
	Report

Tskaltubo Technical Center, Tsqaltubo
Referee: Joakim Östling (Sweden)
20 March 2024
14:00

Georgia	0–2	Serbia
	Report	Vasilić 49'; Kostov 83'

Ramaz Shengelia Stadium, Kutaisi
Referee: Dalibor Černý (Czech Republic)

23 March 2024
14:00

Turkey	1–3	Georgia
Gülmen 90+1'	Report	Shatirishvili 65'; Doltmourziev 76'; Khutsishvili 90+14'

Ramaz Shengelia Stadium, Kutaisi
Referee: Dalibor Černý (Czech Republic)
23 March 2024
12:00

Serbia	0–1	Denmark
	Report	Johannesen 11'

Tskaltubo Technical Center, Tsqaltubo
Referee: Ben Mcmaster (Northern Ireland)

26 March 2024
14:00

Serbia	3–0	Turkey
Milosavljević 19'; Maksimović 61'; Damjanović 81'	Report

Tskaltubo Technical Center, Tsqaltubo
Referee: Joakim Östling (Sweden)
26 March 2024
14:00

Denmark	7–0	Georgia
Obi 23'; Højer 25', 71', 90+3'; Hyseni 36'; Abildgaard 87'; Hansen 90'	Report

Ramaz Shengelia Stadium, Kutaisi
Referee: Ben Mcmaster (Northern Ireland)

=== Group 7 ===
Pos	Team	Pld	W	D	L	GF	GA	GD	Pts	Qualification
1	Austria (H)	3	2	1	0	7	3	+4	7	Qualified for the final tournament
2	Spain	3	2	0	1	9	3	+6	6	Qualified for the final tournament
3	Norway	3	1	1	1	4	6	−2	4	
4	Slovenia	3	0	0	3	1	9	−8	0	

Source: UEFA
Rules for classification: Qualification tiebreakers
(H) Hosts
20 March 2024
15:30

Spain	3–0	Norway
Arnucio 9' (pen.); Yañez 30', 43'	Report

Lindabrunn, Enzesfeld-Lindabrunn
Referee: Bulat Sariyev (Kazakhstan)
20 March 2024
12:00

Slovenia	0–2	Austria
	Report	Hangl 30'; Adejenughure 62'

Wiener Neustadt Arena, Wiener Neustadt
Referee: Igor Stojchevski (North Macedonia)

23 March 2024
15:30

Spain	5–0	Slovenia
Yañez 2', 13'; Osazuwa 8', 24', 60'	Report

Lindabrunn, Enzesfeld-Lindabrunn
Referee: Oleksii Derevinskyi (Ukraine)
23 March 2024
12:00

Austria	2–2	Norway
Ivanschitz 37' (pen.); Moizi 64'	Report	Nilsen-Modebe 1'; Norbye 90+2'

Wiener Neustadt Arena, Wiener Neustadt
Referee: Bulat Sariyev (Kazakhstan)

26 March 2024
17:00

Austria	3–1	Spain
Fidjeu-Tazemeta 19'; Music 36'; Moizi 80' (pen.)	Report	Hernández 12'

Wiener Neustadt Arena, Wiener Neustadt
Referee: Oleksii Derevinskyi (Ukraine)
26 March 2024
17:00

Norway	2–1	Slovenia
Skaarud 39'; Spiten-Nysæther 57'	Report	Žužek 83'

Fussballakademie Burgenland, Mattersburg
Referee: Igor Stojchevski (North Macedonia)

=== Group 8 ===
Pos	Team	Pld	W	D	L	GF	GA	GD	Pts	Promotion
1	Poland	3	2	0	1	6	3	+3	6 (Note: Head to head points: Poland 3, Czech Republic 0.)	Qualified for the final tournament
2	Czech Republic	3	2	0	1	4	2	+2	6	Qualified for the final tournament
3	Bosnia and Herzegovina (H)	3	1	0	2	4	7	−3	3 (Note: Head to head points: Bosnia and Herzegovina 3, Belarus 0.)	
4	Belarus	3	1	0	2	2	4	−2	3	

Source: UEFA
Rules for classification: Qualification tiebreakers
(H) Hosts
Notes:
20 March 2024
14:00

Poland	4–1	Bosnia and Herzegovina
Dziewiatowski 1'; Izunwanne 40'; Adkonis 76', 85'	Report	Pejić 32'

Stadium Etno Selo Stanišići, Bijeljina
Referee: Jérémy Muller (Luxembourg)
20 March 2024
14:00

Belarus	0–1	Czech Republic
	Report	Sosna 90+1'

Novi Gradski, Ugljevik
Referee: Heini Ziskason Viðoy (Faroe Islands)

23 March 2024
14:00

Poland	0–1	Belarus
	Report	Bakhno 7'

Stadium Etno Selo Stanišići, Bijeljina
Referee: Ashot Ghaltakhchyan (Armenia)
23 March 2024
14:00

Czech Republic	2–0	Bosnia and Herzegovina
Míček 11'; Moudrý 65'	Report

Novi Gradski, Ugljevik
Referee: Jérémy Muller (Luxembourg)

26 March 2024
14:00

Czech Republic	1–2	Poland
Míček 74'	Report	Adkonis 12' (pen.); Pietuszewski 23'

Novi Gradski, Ugljevik
Referee: Heini Ziskason Viðoy (Faroe Islands)
26 March 2024
14:00

Bosnia and Herzegovina	3–1	Belarus
Kraljević 52'; Alajbegović 59' (pen.), 89'	Report	Kazmerchuk 7'

Stadium Etno Selo Stanišići, Bijeljina
Referee: Ashot Ghaltakhchyan (Armenia)

=== Ranking of second-placed teams ===
The seven best second-placed teams from the elite round qualified for the final tournament.

Pos	Grp	Team	Pld	W	D	L	GF	GA	GD	Pts	Qualification
1	1	England	3	2	0	1	11	3	+8	6	Qualified for the final tournament
2	7	Spain	3	2	0	1	9	3	+6	6	Qualified for the final tournament
3	6	Serbia	3	2	0	1	5	1	+4	6	Qualified for the final tournament
4	8	Czech Republic	3	2	0	1	4	2	+2	6	Qualified for the final tournament
5	2	Wales	3	2	0	1	5	4	+1	6	Qualified for the final tournament
6	4	Slovakia	3	2	0	1	3	4	−1	6	Qualified for the final tournament
7	5	Croatia	3	1	1	1	8	6	+2	4	Qualified for the final tournament
8	3	Belgium	3	1	1	1	6	7	−1	4	

Source: UEFA
Rules for classification: 1) points; 2) goal difference; 3) goals scored; 4) disciplinary points; 5) coefficient; 6) drawing of lots.

== Goalscorers ==
In the qualifying round, there were 245 goals scored in 75 matches, for an average of 3.27 goals per match. In the elite round, there were 156 goals scored in 48 matches, for an average of 3.25 goals per match. In total, there were 401 goals scored in 123 matches, for an average of 3.26 goals per match.

5 goals

- (Spain) Adrian Arnucio

4 goals

- (England) Jesse Derry
- (England) Mikey Moore
- (Ukraine) Artem Stepanov

3 goals

- (Germany) Francis Onyeka
- (Iceland) Thomas Ari Arnarsson
- (Poland) Jakub Adkonis
- (Portugal) Gabriel Silva
- (Republic of Ireland) Mason Melia
- (Serbia) Bogdan Kostić
- (Spain) Pol Duran
- (Sweden) Jonah Kusi-Asare
- (Switzerland) Dion Cakolli
- (Ukraine) Dmytro Bohdanov

2 goals

- (Austria) Oghenetejiri Adejenughure
- (Bosnia and Herzegovina) Dragan Pejić
- (Croatia) Patrice Čović
- (Croatia) Mislav Ćutuk
- (Croatia) Duje Matić
- (Czech Republic) Josef Kolářík
- (Denmark) Nicolaj Hansen
- (Denmark) Chido Obi
- (England) Jack Fletcher
- (England) Shumaira Mheuka
- (England) Divine Mukasa
- (England) Callum Olusesi
- (France) Rayane Messi Tanfouri
- (Germany) Ken Izekor
- (Hungary) Kevin Mondovics
- (Iceland) Daníel Ingi Johannesson
- (Kosovo) Leotrim Jerlija
- (Latvia) Emīls Sprukts
- (Romania) David-Andronic Popa
- (Scotland) Calum Adamson
- (Serbia) Eldin Bajramović
- (Serbia) Stefan Mladenović
- (Slovakia) Denis Valko
- (Slovakia) Šimon Vlna
- (Slovenia) David Pejičić
- (Spain) Guillermo Fernandez Casino
- (Spain) José Reyes López
- (Spain) Sergio Vinatea Puente
- (Switzerland) Eliano Cassese
- (Turkey) Mustafa Hekimoğlu
- (Turkey) Muhammed Mustafa Özkan
- (Ukraine) Nazar Bondar

1 goal

- (Albania) Kris Gecaj
- (Albania) Matias Gici
- (Albania) Brayan Gjyla
- (Andorra) Dani De Lima
- (Armenia) Davit Harutyunyan
- (Austria) Philipp Moizi
- (Austria) Ensar Music
- (Austria) Adrian Riegel
- (Azerbaijan) Tunjay Ahmadov
- (Belarus) Dzianis Ausiannikau
- (Belarus) Aliaksandr Dziarzhynski
- (Belgium) Wilson Da Costa
- (Belgium) Mamandy Diawara
- (Belgium) Nunzio Engwanda-Ongena
- (Belgium) Alexander Reumers
- (Bosnia and Herzegovina) Kerim Alajbegović
- (Bosnia and Herzegovina) Sergej Ignatkov
- (Bosnia and Herzegovina) Dušan Petrović
- (Bulgaria) Steven Gerard Gaote
- (Bulgaria) Filip Gigov
- (Bulgaria) Denis Givedzhov
- (Bulgaria) Mihail Polendakov
- (Croatia) Dukan Ahmeti
- (Croatia) Ivan Barić
- (Croatia) Bruno Durdov
- (Croatia) Petar Zvonimir Kostelac
- (Croatia) Marko Zebić
- (Czech Republic) Karel Belžík
- (Czech Republic) Lukáš Moudrý
- (Czech Republic) Matyáš Nechvátal
- (Czech Republic) Matyáš Poturnay
- (Czech Republic) David Řeháček
- (Czech Republic) Šimon Slončík
- (Czech Republic) Florián Ashley Višňa
- (Denmark) Lasse Abildgaard
- (Denmark) Olti Hyseni
- (Denmark) Jonathan Moalem
- (England) Christian Dunbar-Mcdonald
- (Estonia) Patrik Kristal
- (Estonia) Matthias Limberg
- (Faroe Islands) Aron Benjaminsen
- (Finland) Sonosi Daldum
- (Finland) Martin Kirilov
- (Finland) Taavi Koukkumäki
- (Finland) Toivo Mero
- (Finland) Adiche Sabwele
- (Finland) Matias Siltanen
- (France) Oumar Camara
- (France) Enzo Sternal
- (France) Yael Thebault
- (Georgia (country)) Reziko Danelia
- (Georgia (country)) Nikoloz Elisashvili
- (Georgia (country)) Giorgi Gvasalia
- (Germany) Denis Husser
- (Germany) Juan Tiago Esteban Poller
- (Germany) Otto Emerson Stange
- (Greece) Christos Efraim Darviras
- (Greece) Bedri Dunga
- (Greece) Zois Karargyris
- (Greece) Charalampos Kostoulas
- (Greece) Anestis Mythou
- (Greece) Stelio Sulanjaku
- (Hungary) Barnabás Barkóczi
- (Hungary) Imre Egri
- (Hungary) Zalán Kugyela
- (Iceland) Tómas Johannessen
- (Iceland) Gunnar Orri Olsen
- (Italy) Francesco Camarda
- (Italy) Federico Coletta
- (Italy) Stefano Maiorana
- (Italy) Mattia Mosconi
- (Italy) Alessandro Verde
- (Kosovo) Leart Bekolli
- (Latvia) Jegors Poskrjobiševs
- (Lithuania) Nedas Garbaliaukas
- (Lithuania) Ernestas Zdanovič
- (Luxembourg) Andrade Brites
- (Luxembourg) Idney Melo Co
- (Malta) Thomas Melillo
- (Moldova) Nichita Caragheorgi
- (Moldova) Ilie Efros
- (Montenegro) Andrej Kostić
- (North Macedonia) Edin Etoski
- (Northern Ireland) Cole Brannigan
- (Northern Ireland) Callum Burnside
- (Northern Ireland) Briaden Graham
- (Northern Ireland) Conor Haughey
- (Norway) Jesper Nerhus Eikrem
- (Norway) Sean Nilsen-Modebe
- (Poland) Michael Izunwanne
- (Poland) Hubert Jasiak
- (Poland) Oskar Pietuszewski
- (Poland) Kacper Potulski
- (Portugal) Eduardo Felicíssimo
- (Portugal) Afonso Meireles
- (Portugal) Rafael Mota
- (Portugal) Denilson Santos
- (Portugal) Rui Silva
- (Portugal) João Trovisco
- (Portugal) Cardoso Varela
- (Portugal) Afonso Vieira
- (Republic of Ireland) Jaden Umeh
- (Romania) Vlad Oargă
- (Romania) Mihai-Vlăduț Toma
- (Scotland) Owen Stirton
- (Serbia) Uroš Đorđević
- (Serbia) Djordje Ranković
- (Serbia) Aleksa Vasilić
- (Slovakia) Dominik Balog
- (Slovakia) Samuel Kováčik
- (Slovakia) Samuel Lusale
- (Slovakia) Jakub Pira
- (Slovakia) Filip Trello
- (Slovenia) Mateo Aćimović
- (Slovenia) Arman Durmiši
- (Slovenia) Svit Hocevar
- (Slovenia) Sven Šunta
- (Spain) Antonio Fernandez Casino
- (Spain) Jose Fernandez Cortes
- (Spain) Victor Fernandez Duran
- (Sweden) Neo Jönsson
- (Sweden) Nikolaj Staykov
- (Switzerland) Enrique Aguilar
- (Switzerland) Eliano Guido
- (Switzerland) Eman Kospo
- (Switzerland) Zidan Tairi
- (Ukraine) Oleksandr Drahan
- (Ukraine) Yevhen Harmash
- (Ukraine) Bohdan Redushko
- (Ukraine) Artur Ukhan
- (Wales) Cruz Allen
- (Wales) Oliver Bostock
- (Wales) Louis Griffiths
- (Wales) Iestyn Jones
- (Wales) Elliott Myles

1 own goal

- (Albania) Rinaldo Nela (against Czech Republic)
- (Denmark) Victor Gustafsen (against Georgia)
- (Faroe Islands) Jósef Ólavsson (against England)
- (Finland) Ilari Kangasniemi (against Ukraine)
- (Latvia) Helvijs Joksts (against Sweden)
- (Latvia) Krists Pļavinš (against Poland)
- (Scotland) Alfie Halliwell (against Belarus)
- (Serbia) Igor Bubanja (against Azerbaijan)

Source: UEFA
