= Ukko Happonen =

Finnish footballer (born 2007)

Personal information
- Full name: Ukko Antti Einari Happonen
- Date of birth: 13 March 2007 (age 19)
- Place of birth: Tuusula, Finland
- Height: 1.93 m (6 ft 4 in)
- Position: Goalkeeper

Team information
- Current team: Bologna
- Number: 77

Youth career
- TuPS
- ToTE
- 2019–2023: PKKU
- 2023–: Bologna

Senior career*
Years	Team	Apps	(Gls)
2026–	Bologna	0	(0)

International career^{‡}
2021–2022	Finland U15	3	(0)
2022–2023	Finland U16	6	(0)
2023–2024	Finland U17	3	(0)
2024–2025	Finland U18	2	(0)
2025	Finland U19	4	(0)
2026–	Finland U21	1	(0)
- * Club domestic league appearances and goals as of 24 August 2026 ‡ National team caps and goals as of 8 June 2026

Ukko Antti Einari Happonen (born 13 March 2007) is a Finnish footballer who plays as a goalkeeper for Serie A club Bologna.

== Youth career ==
In July 2023, it was announced that Happonen will transfer from PK Keski-Uusimaa to Bologna in Italy, signing a three-year deal with an option to extend, for an undisclosed fee. He is registered as a youth academy player.

== Club career ==
After occasionally appearing on the Bologna senior team's bench in the 2025–26 season, he started the 2026–27 season with the senior squad.

== International career ==
Happonen was part of the Finland U16 squad that won the friendly tournament Baltic Cup in July 2023.

On 4 October 2023, he was named in the Finland U17 squad in the 2024 UEFA European Under-17 Championship qualification tournament. In the tournament Finland drew with Ukraine and Germany 2–2 and 1–1, respectively, before winning Liechtenstein 3–0, placing 2nd in the group and advancing to the Elite round.
