= Axel Sandler =

Finnish footballer (born 2007)

Personal information
- Full name: Axel Vilhelm Olavi Sandler
- Date of birth: 5 January 2007 (age 19)
- Place of birth: Finland
- Height: 1.95 m (6 ft 5 in)
- Position: Defender

Team information
- Current team: Inter Turku
- Number: 20

Youth career
- ToTe
- KäPa
- –2023: HJK
- 2023–2024: AC Milan
- 2024–2026: AIK

Senior career*
Years	Team	Apps	(Gls)
2023	Klubi 04	1	(0)
2026–	Inter Turku	1	(0)
2026–	Inter Turku II	16	(2)

International career^{‡}
2021–2022	Finland U15	4	(0)
2023	Finland U16	4	(0)
2023–	Finland U17	13	(0)
2024–2025	Finland U18	4	(0)
2025–	Finland U19	2	(0)
- * Club domestic league appearances and goals as of 12 November 2026 ‡ National team caps and goals as of 9 September 2025

Axel Vilhelm Olavi Sandler (born 5 January 2007) is a Finnish professional footballer who plays as a defender for the Veikkausliiga club Inter Turku.

== Club career ==
=== HJK ===
On 26 July 2023, Sandler made his senior debut for Klubi 04, the reserve team of HJK, in a third-tier Kakkonen match against Reipas Lahti.

=== AC Milan ===
In September 2023, Sandler was acquired by Italian Serie A club AC Milan, for an undisclosed fee. He was initially assigned to the club's under-18 squad.

=== AIK ===
In August 2024, Sandler moved to Sweden and signed with Allsvenskan club AIK, initially joining the under-19 squad.

== International career ==
Sandler was part of the Finland U16 squad that won the friendly tournament Baltic Cup in July 2023.

On 4 October 2023, he was named in the Finland U17 squad in the 2024 UEFA European Under-17 Championship qualification tournament. In the tournament Finland drew with Ukraine and Germany 2–2 and 1–1, respectively, before winning Liechtenstein 3–0, placing 2nd in the group and advancing to the Elite round.
