= Ken Izekor =

German footballer (born 2007)

Personal information
- Full name: Ken Eghosa Gideon Izekor
- Date of birth: 24 May 2007 (age 19)
- Place of birth: Aachen, Germany
- Height: 1.77 m (5 ft 10 in)
- Position: Forward

Team information
- Current team: Alemannia Aachen
- Number: 18

Youth career
- Alemannia Aachen
- 2018–2025: Bayer Leverkusen

Senior career*
Years	Team	Apps	(Gls)
2023–2026	Bayer Leverkusen	0	(0)
2026	→ Eintracht Braunschweig (loan)	1	(0)
2026	→ Eintracht Braunschweig II (loan)	7	(2)
2026–	Alemannia Aachen	0	(0)

International career^{‡}
2022–2023	Germany U16	11	(3)
2023–2024	Germany U17	9	(3)
- * Club domestic league appearances and goals as of 18 May 2026 ‡ National team caps and goals as of 14 February 2024

Ken Eghosa Gideon Izekor (born 24 May 2007) is a German professional footballer who plays as a forward for 3. Liga club Alemannia Aachen.

== Club career ==
=== Bayer Leverkusen ===
A youth product of Alemannia Aachen, Izekor moved to the youth academy of Bayer Leverkusen in 2018. On 18 February 2023, he signed a professional contract with Bayer Leverkusen until 2026. He made his professional debut with them as a substitute in a 5–1 UEFA Europa League win over Molde on 14 December 2023. Aged 16 years and 204 days old, he was the youngest ever Leverkusen debutant in a competitive match.

==== Loan to Eintracht Braunschweig ====
On 2 February 2026, Izekor joined Eintracht Braunschweig in 2. Bundesliga, on loan with an option to buy.

=== Alemannia Aachen ===
On 9 July 2026, Izekor returned to his hometown youth club Alemannia Aachen in 3. Liga.

== International career ==
Born in Germany, Izekor is of Nigerian descent. He was called up to the Germany U17s in November 2023 for a set of 2024 UEFA European Under-17 Championship qualification matches.
