= Víctor Fernández (footballer, born 2007) =

Spanish footballer

Personal information
- Full name: Víctor Fernández Durán
- Date of birth: 9 November 2007 (age 19)
- Place of birth: Valladolid, Spain
- Height: 1.70 m (5 ft 7 in)
- Position: Attacking midfielder

Team information
- Current team: Valladolid (on loan from Valencia)

Youth career
- 2016–2024: Valladolid

Senior career*
Years	Team	Apps	(Gls)
2023–2024	Valladolid B	8	(0)
2024–2026	Levante	1	(0)
2025–2026	→ Valencia B (loan)	32	(11)
2026–	Valencia B	0	(0)
2026–	→ Valladolid (loan)	0	(0)

International career
2023–	Spain U17	5	(1)
- * Club domestic league appearances and goals as of 15 May 2026

Víctor Fernández Durán (born 9 November 2007), sometimes known as Víctor Jr., is a Spanish footballer who plays as an attacking midfielder for Real Valladolid, on loan from Valencia CF.

== Club career ==
=== Valladolid ===
Born in Valladolid, Castile and León, Fernández joined Real Valladolid's youth sides in 2016, aged nine. He made his senior debut with the reserves on 2 December 2023, coming on as a late substitute for goalscorer Israel Salazar in a 2–1 Segunda Federación home win over Zamora CF; aged 16 years and 23 days, he became the youngest player to feature with the B-side, breaking Adrián Arnu's record.

In April 2024, several media outlets reported that Fernández would leave the Pucela after not agreeing to a new contract. After that, he did not feature for either the reserves or the Juvenil squad until the end of his link in June.

=== Levante ===
On 4 July 2024, Fernández signed a four-year contract with Segunda División side Levante UD. He spent the entire pre-season with the main squad, but was unable to feature in any matches until 14 September as the club could did not have a "visa" for him to play with the first team, as he was registered with the reserves.

Fernández made his club – and professional – debut on 29 September 2024, replacing Carlos Álvarez late into a 4–2 home win over UD Almería.

=== Valencia ===
On 1 September 2025, Fernández moved to Valencia CF on a one-year loan deal, being initially assigned to the reserves in the fourth division. The following 24 June, after scoring 11 goals for the B's, he signed a permanent three-year deal with the club, and returned to his first club Valladolid on loan on 8 July.

== International career ==
Fernández made his debut with the Spain national under-17 team on 6 September 2023, in a 2–1 win over Morocco. He scored his first goal with the side on 28 October, in a 5–0 routing of North Macedonia.

== Personal life ==
Fernández's father, also named Víctor, was also a footballer. A striker, he too played for Valladolid.

== Honours ==
Levante

- Segunda División: 2024–25
