= Mats Spiten =

Norwegian footballer (born 2010)

Personal information
- Full name: Mats Spiten
- Date of birth: 8 January 2010 (age 16)
- Height: 1.83 m (6 ft 0 in)
- Position: Forward

Team information
- Current team: Strømsgodset
- Number: 39

Youth career
- –2022: Mjøndalen
- 2023–2025: Strømsgodset

Senior career*
Years	Team	Apps	(Gls)
2025–	Strømsgodset 2	25	(15)
2025–	Strømsgodset	16	(1)
- * Club domestic league appearances and goals as of 20 November 2026

Mats Spiten (born 8 January 2010) is a Norwegian professional footballer who plays as a forward for Norwegian First Division club Strømsgodset. He became the youngest player in Strømsgodset's history when he made his senior debut at the age of 15 years and 95 days in April 2025, breaking a record previously held by Martin Ødegaard.

== Club career ==
=== Youth career ===
Spiten grew up in Kongsberg, Norway, and began playing football for Kongsberg IF before joining Mjøndalen as a youth player. He joined the youth academy of Strømsgodset at the age of 12.

During the 2024 season, he scored 15 goals in 11 matches in the national under-15 league. He also represented the club at under-16 and under-17 levels. Spiten spent time training with the youth academy of Dutch club PSV.

In January 2025, shortly after his 15th birthday, Spiten signed his first professional contract with Strømsgodset, agreeing to a three-year deal.

=== Strømsgodset ===
On 13 April 2025, Spiten made his senior debut for Strømsgodset in a 5–0 victory over Konnerud in the first round of the Norwegian Football Cup. He came on as a half-time substitute for Herman Stengel, becoming the youngest player in the club's history at 15 years and 95 days. The previous record had been held by Martin Ødegaard, who was 15 years and 117 days old when he made his debut in 2014.

He made his Eliteserien debut against Vålerenga on 29 June 2025, aged just 15 years and 172 days, making him one of the youngest players in the competition's history. He made a further two league appearances during the 2025 season.

Following Strømsgodset's relegation to the Norwegian First Division, Spiten continued to feature for the first team in 2026. In April that year, aged 16, he signed a new three-year contract and was permanently promoted to the senior squad.

During the 2026 season, he made 13 league appearances and scored his first competitive league goal for the club.

== Career statistics ==
As of 20 November 2026

Appearances and goals by club, season and competition
Club	Season	League		
Club	Season	Division	Apps	Goals
Strømsgodset 2	2025	3. divisjon	20	10
Strømsgodset 2	2026	3. divisjon	5	5
Total			25	15
Strømsgodset	2025	Eliteserien	3	0
Strømsgodset	2026	1. divisjon	13	1
Total			16	1
Career total			41	16

League appearances and goals are recorded by Strømsgodset and the Norwegian Football Federation.
