= Finland national under-19 football team =

National under-19 football team representing Finland

Finland U19
- Association: Football Association of Finland (Suomen Palloliitto) (Finlands Bollförbund)
- Confederation: UEFA (Europe)
- Head coach: (Åland) Peter Lundberg
- FIFA code: FIN
First colours	Second colours

FIFA U-20 World Cup
- Appearances: 1 (first in 2001)
- Best result: Group Stage (2001)

European Under-19 Championship
- Appearances: 1 (first in 2018)
- Best result: Group Stage (2018)

The Finland national under-19 football team represents Finland in the UEFA European Under-19 Championship.

== UEFA European Under-19 Championship ==
=== UEFA European Under-19 Championship ===
UEFA European Under-19 Championship record								UEFA European Under-19 Championship Qualification/Elite record						
Year	Round	Pld	W	D *	L	GF	GA	Position	Pld	W	D *	L	GF	GA
1963-2001	See Finland national under-18 football team													
(Norway) 2002	Did not qualify							First Qualifying Round	2	1	0	1	4	3
(Liechtenstein) 2003	Did not qualify							First Qualifying Round	3	0	1	2	1	6
(Switzerland) 2004	Did not qualify							Second Qualifying Round	6	3	0	3	10	9
(Northern Ireland) 2005	Did not qualify							Qualification Round	3	1	1	1	10	5
(England) 2006	Did not qualify							Qualification Round	3	1	0	2	6	3
(Austria) 2007	Did not qualify							Qualification Round	3	0	1	2	3	8
(Czech Republic) 2008	Did not qualify							Qualification Round	3	1	0	2	3	3
(Ukraine) 2009	Did not qualify							Elite Round	6	3	1	2	9	7
(France) 2010	Did not qualify							Qualification Round	3	1	0	2	3	7
(Romania) 2011	Did not qualify							Qualification Round	3	1	0	2	6	5
(Estonia) 2012	Did not qualify							Qualification Round	3	1	0	2	6	8
(Lithuania) 2013	Did not qualify							Qualification Round	3	1	0	2	2	4
(Hungary) 2014	Did not qualify							Qualification Round	3	0	1	2	0	7
(Greece) 2015	Did not qualify							Qualification Round	3	0	2	1	2	5
(Germany) 2016	Did not qualify							Qualification Round	3	1	1	1	3	3
(Georgia (country)) 2017	Did not qualify							Elite Round	6	2	2	2	12	9
(Finland) 2018	Group stage	3	0	0	3	2	7	Qualified as host						
(Armenia) 2019	Did not qualify							Qualification Round	3	0	2	1	0	3
2020 and 2021 were cancelled due to COVID-19 pandemic
(Slovakia) 2022	Did not qualify							Elite Round	6	3	0	3	7	10
(Malta) 2023	Did not qualify							Qualifying round	3	2	0	1	7	6
(Northern Ireland) 2024	Did not qualify							Qualifying round	3	1	1	1	8	1
(Romania) 2025	Did not qualify							Elite Round	6	3	0	3	13	7
(Wales) 2026	Did not qualify							Elite Round	6	2	1	3	5	11
(Czech Republic) 2027	To Be Determined							Round 2						

=== Granatkin Memorial ===
- 2011 champion
- 2012 runners-up

== Current squad ==
- The following players were called up for the 2026 UEFA European Under-19 Championship qualification matches.
- Match dates: 25, 28 and 31 March 2026
- Opposition: Netherlands, Spain, Slovenia
- Caps and goals correct as of: 18 November 2025, after the match against Andorra

No.	Pos.	Player	Date of birth (age)	Caps	Goals	Club
	GK	Mitja Haapanen	4 August 2007 (age 19)	1	0	(Football Association of Finland) HJK
	GK	Osku Maukonen	15 February 2007 (age 19)	8	0	(Football Association of Finland) Lahti
	DF	Ilari Kangasniemi	22 April 2007 (age 19)	14	1	(Football Association of Finland) Inter Turku
	DF	Jere Kari	24 February 2007 (age 19)	2	0	(Football Association of Finland) HJK
	DF	Ville Kumpu	18 February 2008 (age 18)	5	0	(Football Association of Finland) Ilves
	DF	Adam Le Goff-Conan	21 April 2007 (age 19)	6	0	(Football Association of Finland) HJK
	DF	Eetu Turkki	31 January 2007 (age 19)	2	0	(Football Association of Finland) TPS
	MF	Taavi Koukkumäki	16 April 2007 (age 19)	8	1	(German Football Association) Borussia Mönchengladbach
	MF	Aniis Machaal	2 May 2007 (age 19)	2	0	(Football Association of Finland) SJK
	MF	Oskari Multala	13 March 2007 (age 19)	6	0	(Football Association of Finland) Ilves
	MF	Antton Nylund	18 June 2008 (age 18)	7	0	(Football Association of Finland) HJK
	MF	Leon Vesterbacka	2 December 2007 (age 18)	6	0	(Football Association of Finland) SJK
	MF	David Weiss	29 May 2007 (age 19)	2	0	(Italian Football Federation) Sassuolo
	FW	Sonosi Daldum	19 March 2007 (age 19)	3	1	(Italian Football Federation) Sassuolo
	FW	Martin Kirilov	8 August 2007 (age 19)	10	2	(Football Association of Finland) HJK
	FW	Valo Konttas	7 August 2007 (age 19)	3	0	(Football Association of Finland) HJK
	FW	Elmeri Lappalainen	12 June 2007 (age 19)	0	0	(Football Association of Finland) Gnistan
	FW	Toivo Mero	7 October 2007 (age 19)	7	1	(Football Association of Finland) HJK
	FW	Djoully Nzoko	11 October 2007 (age 19)	15	3	(Royal Belgian Football Association) Jong Genk
	FW	Rudi Vikström	18 July 2007 (age 19)	7	5	(Football Association of Finland) Jaro

== Coaching staff ==
Name	Role
(Åland) Peter Lundberg	Head coach
(Finland) Mika Nurmela	Assistant coach
(Finland) Sami Ristilä	Assistant coach
(Finland) Jarkko Ojaniemi	Goalkeeping coach
(Finland) Joonas Pöntinen	Goalkeeping coach
(Finland) Ville Ranta-aho	Physiotherapist
(Finland) Antti Kuhmola	Doctor

== See also ==
- Finland national football team
- Finland national under-21 football team
- Finland national under-18 football team
- Finland national under-17 football team
- Finland national under-16 football team
