= Ann Sire Fjerdingstad =

Norwegian politician

Ann Sire Fjerdingstad (born 23 July 1959) is a Norwegian politician for the Conservative Party and former mayor of Øvre Eiker. She ran as mayor from 2009 to 2019.

== Football career ==
Ann Sire Fjerdingstad
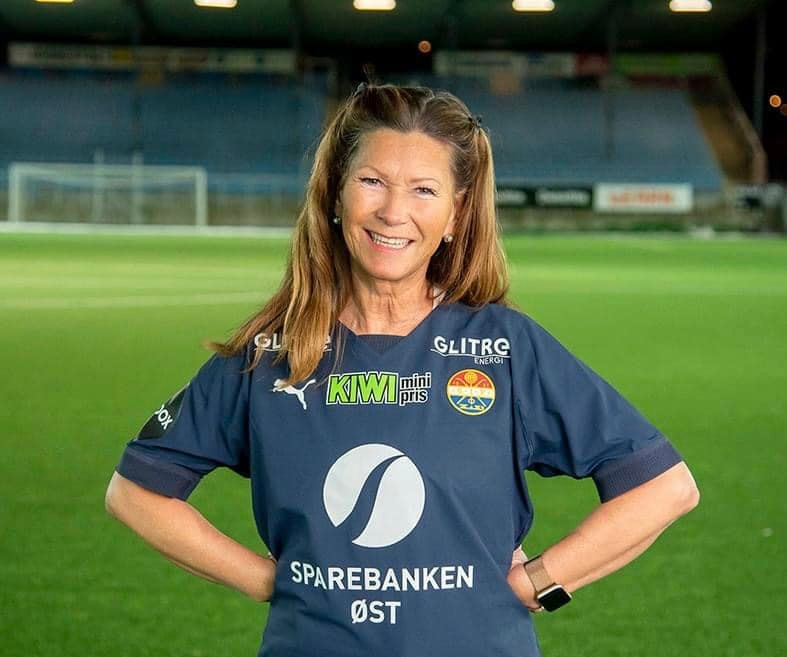

Personal information
- Date of birth: June 23, 1959 (age 67)

Before Fjerdingstad became a politician she played football for SBK Drafn from 1977 to 1980. Between 2021 and March 2024, she served as chairwoman of the board of Strømsgodset Toppfotball.

Preceded by Anders B. Werp	Mayor of Øvre Eiker; 2009-2019	Succeeded by Knut Kvale
