= 1988 UEFA European Under-16 Championship =

Campeonato Europeo Sub-16 de la UEFA 1988

Tournament details
- Host country: Spain
- Dates: 11–21 May
- Teams: 16 (from 1 confederation)

Final positions
- Champions: Spain (2nd title)
- Runners-up: Portugal
- Third place: East Germany
- Fourth place: West Germany

Tournament statistics
- Matches played: 28
- Goals scored: 50 (1.79 per match)

The 1988 UEFA European Under-16 Championship was the 6th edition of the UEFA's European Under-16 Football Championship. Spain hosted the 16 teams entered the competition during 11–21 May 1988.

Italy did not defend its win in the previous year's final.

Spain won their second title.

== Participants ==
- Austria
- Belgium
- East Germany
- Finland
- France
- Hungary
- Republic of Ireland
- Norway
- Portugal
- Romania
- Spain
- Sweden
- Switzerland
- Turkey
- West Germany
- Yugoslavia

== Results ==
=== First stage ===
==== Group A ====
Team	Pld	W	D	L	GF	GA	GD	Pts
West Germany	3	2	1	0	6	2	+4	5
Norway	3	1	1	1	3	2	+1	3
Finland	3	1	0	2	2	4	−2	2
Austria	3	1	0	2	1	4	−3	2

11 May 1988

Finland	1–0	Austria
Nurmela

Alicante
Referee: (Portugal) José Alberto Veiga Trigo

11 May 1988

West Germany	1–1	Norway

Elche

13 May 1988

Norway	2–0	Finland

Santa Pola
Referee: (Republic of Ireland) John Spillane

13 May 1988

West Germany	3–0	Austria

Benidorm

15 May 1988

West Germany	2–1	Finland
		Nurmela

Alicante
Referee: (Switzerland) Kurt Röthlisberger

15 May 1988

Austria	1–0	Norway

Elda

==== Group B ====
Team	Pld	W	D	L	GF	GA	GD	Pts
East Germany	3	1	2	0	3	2	+1	4
Sweden	3	1	2	0	3	2	+1	4
Romania	3	0	3	0	3	3	0	3
Yugoslavia	3	0	1	2	1	3	−2	1

11 May 1988

Romania	1–1	East Germany

Cáceres

11 May 1988

Sweden	1–0	Yugoslavia

Don Benito

13 May 1988

Romania	1–1	Sweden

Almendralejo

13 May 1988

East Germany	1–0	Yugoslavia

Badajoz

15 May 1988

Romania	1–1	Yugoslavia

Los Santos de Maimona

15 May 1988

East Germany	1–1	Sweden
Penalties
	5–4

Mérida

==== Group C ====
Team	Pld	W	D	L	GF	GA	GD	Pts
Spain	3	2	1	0	5	2	+3	5
Hungary	3	1	2	0	2	1	+1	4
France	3	1	1	1	2	2	0	3
Turkey	3	0	0	3	2	6	−4	0

11 May 1988

Hungary	0–0	Spain

Antequera
Referee: (East Germany) Klaus Scheurell

11 May 1988

Turkey	0–1	France
	Report	21' Ouédec

Benalmádena
Referee: (Spain) ?

13 May 1988

Hungary	1–0	Turkey

Benalmádena
Referee: (Romania) ?

13 May 1988

Spain	1–0	France

Municipal, Marbella
Referee: (Sweden) Rune Larsson

15 May 1988

Hungary	1–1	France

Municipal, Marbella

15 May 1988

Spain	4–2	Turkey
Manolo; Urzaiz; Silvestre	Report	57' Süleyman Gülaşlar; 65' Şükür

La Rosaleda Stadium, Málaga
Referee: (East Germany) Klaus Scheurell

==== Group D ====
Team	Pld	W	D	L	GF	GA	GD	Pts
Portugal	3	2	1	0	2	0	+2	5
Republic of Ireland	3	1	2	0	3	2	+1	4
Belgium	3	1	0	2	2	3	−1	2
Switzerland	3	0	1	2	3	5	−2	1

11 May 1988

Republic of Ireland	0–0	Portugal

Basauri

11 May 1988

Switzerland	1–2	Belgium

Bilbao

13 May 1988

Republic of Ireland	2–2	Switzerland

Santurtzi

13 May 1988

Portugal	1–0	Belgium

Barakaldo

15 May 1988

Republic of Ireland	1–0	Belgium

Getxo

15 May 1988

Portugal	1–0	Switzerland

Sestao

=== Semi-finals ===
18 May 1988

West Germany	0–3	Spain

Estadio Las Margaritas, Getafe
Referee: (Republic of Ireland) Stillander
18 May 1988

East Germany	0–4	Portugal

Valdemoro

=== Third place match ===
21 May 1988

West Germany	0–0	East Germany
Penalties
	4–5

Madrid

=== Final ===
21 May 1988

Spain	0–0	Portugal
Penalties
Manolo (penalty scored); Lasa (penalty scored); Urzaiz (penalty scored); Silvestre (penalty scored)	4–2	(penalty scored) Rui Bento; (penalty missed) Paulo Pilar; (penalty scored) Jorge Costa; (penalty missed) Luís Miguel

Vallecas, Madrid
Attendance: 18,000
Referee: (France) Michel Girard
