= Samuel Lusale =

Slovak footballer (born 2007)

Personal information
- Full name: Samuel Malama Lusale
- Date of birth: 7 September 2007 (age 19)
- Place of birth: Guildford, England
- Position: Winger

Team information
- Current team: Manchester United
- Number: 80

Youth career
- –2020: Guildford Saints
- 2020–2024: Crystal Palace
- 2024–: Manchester United

International career^{‡}
Years	Team	Apps	(Gls)
2024	Slovakia U17	6	(1)
2025–	Slovakia U19	3	(0)
- ‡ National team caps and goals as of 25 March 2025

Samuel Malama Lusale (born 7 September 2007) is a footballer who plays as a winger for Manchester United. Born in England, he is a Slovakia youth international.

== Early life ==
Lusale was born on 7 September 2007 in Guildford, England. Born to a Zambian, Malagasy father and a Slovak mother, he represents Slovakia at youth international level, though he does not speak Slovak.

As a youth player, Lusale joined the academy of English side Guildford Saints. At the age of 13 he joined the Crystal Palace youth academy. In July 2024, he joined the youth academy of Manchester United.

== International career ==
Lusale is a Slovakia youth international and is eligible to represent Zambia internationally through his father. In addition, he is eligible to represent England internationally, having been born in the country. On 6 March 2024, he made his debut for the Slovakia national under-17 football team during a 2–1 away win over Switzerland national under-17 football team during 2024 UEFA European Under-17 Championship qualification. He made another appearance in a 2–0 loss against Italy, coming on as a substitute for Dávid Bukovský. In 2025, he was nominated for the Slovakia national under-19 football team ahead of the U17 Euros qualifiers.

== Style of play ==
Lusale plays as a winger. American news website ESPN wrote in 2024 that "his exceptional acceleration, relentless enthusiasm to beat defenders, and clever movement in the final third are qualities that will see him talked about".
