= André Stavås Skistad =

Norwegian footballer (born 2007)

Personal information
- Full name: André Stavås Skistad
- Date of birth: 11 January 2007 (age 19)
- Height: 1.87 m (6 ft 2 in)
- Position: Central midfielder

Team information
- Current team: Strømsgodset
- Number: 19

Youth career
- –2019: Konnerud
- 2020–2024: Strømsgodset

Senior career*
Years	Team	Apps	(Gls)
2023–	Strømsgodset 2	51	(9)
2025–	Strømsgodset	6	(0)

International career^{‡}
2022	Norway U15	4	(0)
2023	Norway U16	2	(0)
2024	Norway U17	3	(0)
2025	Norway U18	5	(2)
- * Club domestic league appearances and goals as of 20 November 2026 ‡ National team caps and goals as of 20 November 2026

André Stavås Skistad (born 11 January 2007) is a Norwegian professional footballer who plays as a central midfielder for Norwegian First Division club Strømsgodset.

== Club career ==
=== Early career ===
Skistad began his youth career with Konnerud before joining the academy of Strømsgodset. In August 2022, aged 15, he signed his first professional contract with the club, a three-year deal.

He made his senior debut for Strømsgodset's reserve team in the Norwegian Second Division in 2023, making four appearances and scoring one goal. During the same season, he was part of the club's under-19 team that won the Norwegian Under-19 Football Championship, starting the final against Rosenborg.

In 2024, Skistad became a regular in the reserve team, making 23 league appearances in the Norwegian Third Division. He also represented Strømsgodset in the UEFA Youth League, starting both matches against Dutch club AZ Alkmaar.

=== Strømsgodset ===
On 13 April 2025, Skistad made his first-team debut for Strømsgodset in a 5–0 away victory against his former club Konnerud in the first round of the Norwegian Football Cup.

He made his Eliteserien debut on 2 November 2025, starting in a 2–1 home defeat against Viking at Marienlyst Stadion. He played the full 90 minutes and subsequently featured against Kristiansund, Sandefjord and Rosenborg, finishing the season with four league appearances.

In February 2026, Skistad suffered a foot fracture during pre-season training. Despite the injury, he signed a new three-year contract in March, extending his stay at Strømsgodset until the end of the 2028 season.

Following Strømsgodset's relegation to the Norwegian First Division, he made two league appearances during the 2026 season.

== International career ==
Skistad has represented Norway at under-15, under-16, under-17 and under-18 levels. He made four appearances for the under-15 team in 2022, followed by two under-16 appearances in 2023 and three under-17 appearances in 2024. In 2025, he played five matches for the under-18 national team, scoring twice.

== Personal life ==
Skistad grew up in Konnerud, a district of Drammen. His older sister is Kristine Stavås Skistad, a Norwegian international cross-country skier, while his older brother Erik Stavås Skistad is also a footballer who has played for Mjøndalen.

== Career statistics ==
As of 20 November 2026

Appearances and goals by club, season and competition
Club	Season	League		
Club	Season	Division	Apps	Goals
Strømsgodset 2	2023	2. divisjon	4	1
Strømsgodset 2	2024	3. divisjon	23	1
Strømsgodset 2	2025	3. divisjon	17	5
Strømsgodset 2	2026	3. divisjon	7	2
Total			51	9
Strømsgodset	2025	Eliteserien	4	0
Strømsgodset	2026	1. divisjon	2	0
Total			6	0
Career total			57	9
