= Eetu Turkki =

Finnish footballer (born 2007)

Personal information
- Date of birth: 31 January 2007 (age 19)
- Place of birth: Finland
- Height: 1.84 m (6 ft 0 in)
- Position: Left back

Team information
- Current team: TPS (on loan from Ilves)
- Number: 3

Youth career
- –2023: Ilves

Senior career*
Years	Team	Apps	(Gls)
2023–	Ilves II	24	(0)
2025–	Ilves	0	(0)
2026–	→ TPS (loan)	16	(0)

International career^{‡}
2021	Finland U15	1	(0)
2022–2023	Finland U16	8	(0)
2023–2024	Finland U17	8	(0)
2024	Finland U18	2	(0)
2025–	Finland U19	5	(0)
- * Club domestic league appearances and goals as of 13 November 2026 ‡ National team caps and goals as of 12 May 2026

Eetu Turkki (born 31 January 2007) is a Finnish professional football player who plays as a left back for Veikkausliiga side Turun Palloseura, on loan from Ilves.
