= Taavi Koukkumäki =

Finnish footballer (born 2007)

Personal information
- Full name: Taavi Koukkumäki
- Date of birth: 16 April 2007 (age 19)
- Place of birth: Finland
- Height: 1.80 m (5 ft 11 in)
- Positions: Midfielder; forward

Team information
- Current team: Borussia Mönchengladbach II
- Number: 21

Youth career
- EBK
- EPS
- GrIFK
- 2022–2023: Honka
- 2023–: Borussia Mönchengladbach

Senior career*
| Years | Team | Apps | (Gls) |
| 2023 | Honka II | 0 | (0) |
| 2026– | Borussia Mönchengladbach II | 16 | (3) |

International career^{‡}
| 2021–2022 | Finland U15 | 5 | (3) |
| 2022–2023 | Finland U16 | 7 | (2) |
| 2023– | Finland U17 | 12 | (4) |
| 2024–2025 | Finland U18 | 6 | (0) |
| 2024– | Finland U19 | 11 | (1) |
- * Club domestic league appearances and goals as of 6 November 2026 ‡ National team caps and goals as of 31 March 2026

Taavi Koukkumäki (born 16 April 2007) is a Finnish professional footballer who plays as a midfielder and forward for Regionalliga West club Borussia Mönchengladbach II.

== Early career ==
Koukkumäki started playing football in the youth teams of Esbo Bollklubb and Grankulla IFK, before joining the FC Honka youth sector in 2022. He made his senior debut with Honka II reserve team on 21 June 2023 in a sixth round of Finnish Cup, scoring a goal in a 5–1 loss against Honka first team. In the summer 2023, he was acquired by German Bundesliga club Borussia Mönchengladbach for an undisclosed fee, and was registered as a youth academy player.

== International career ==
On 4 October 2023, Koukkumäki was named in the Finland U17 squad in the 2024 UEFA European Under-17 Championship qualification tournament. In the tournament Finland drew with Ukraine and Germany 2–2 and 1–1, respectively, before winning Liechtenstein 3–0, placing 2nd in the group and advancing to the Elite round. He scored once and provided an assist in three games.
