= Anders B. Werp =

Norwegian politician

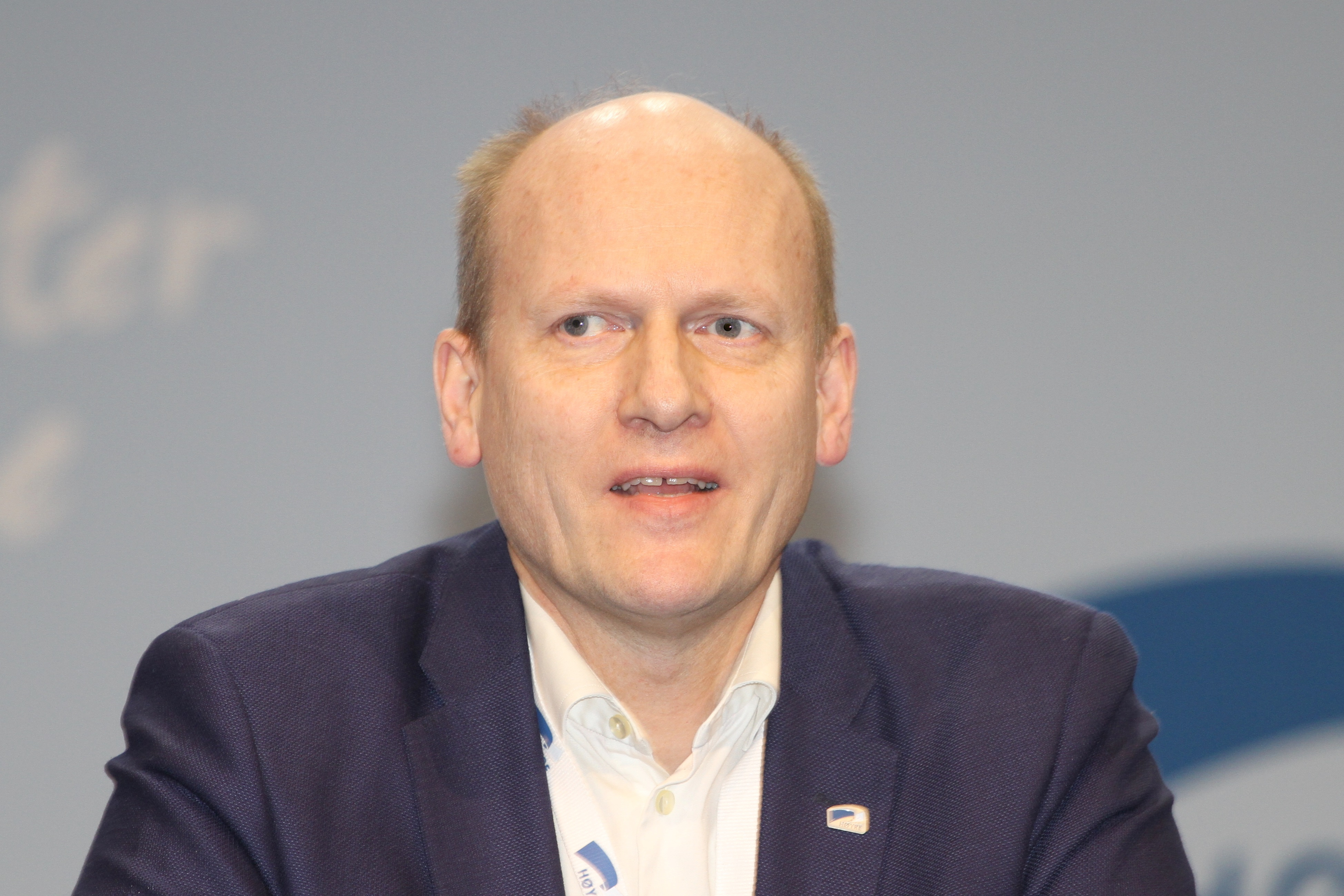
Anders B. Werp (2017)

Anders Bjørnsen Werp (born 16 December 1961) is a Norwegian politician of the Conservative Party. He was mayor of Øvre Eiker from 1999 until he was elected to the Stortinget from Buskerud in 2009. He was also deputy representative in the Stortinget from 1997 until 2005. Werp had formerly worked as an economic consultant and local political advisor for Norges Skogeierforbund. He was the leader of Buskerud Høyre from 1998 to 2008, and sat on Høyre's central board during the same period. He was reelected to the Storting for the period 2013–2017.

== Committees ==
- WERP *2009–2013 member of Justice committee

Preceded by Magne Ødegård	Mayor of Øvre Eiker; 1999-2009	Succeeded by Ann Sire Fjerdingstad
