= Simo Lampinen-Skaug =

Norwegian footballer (born 2005)

Personal information
- Full name: Simo Lampinen-Skaug
- Date of birth: 9 April 2005 (age 21)
- Place of birth: Drammen, Norway
- Height: 1.88 m (6 ft 2 in)
- Position: Goalkeeper

Team information
- Current team: Strømsgodset
- Number: 12

Youth career
- –2020: Skiold
- 2020–2023: Strømsgodset
- 2023–2024: Lecce

Senior career*
| Years | Team | Apps | (Gls) |
| 2022– | Strømsgodset 2 | 47 | (0) |
| 2024– | Strømsgodset | 8 | (0) |
| 2024 | → Eidsvold Turn (loan) | 0 | (0) |
- * Club domestic league appearances and goals as of 20 November 2026

Simo Lampinen-Skaug (born 9 April 2005) is a Norwegian professional footballer who plays as a goalkeeper for Norwegian First Division club Strømsgodset.

== Club career ==
=== Early career ===
Born in Drammen, Lampinen-Skaug began his youth career with local club Skiold before joining the youth academy of Strømsgodset in 2020. He began training with the club's first team at the age of 15.

In August 2023, he joined Italian club Lecce, where he played for their under-19 team in the Campionato Primavera 1. During his time in Italy, he made ten league appearances and two appearances in the UEFA Youth League. He also featured in the 2023 Supercoppa Primavera final against Roma.

=== Strømsgodset ===
Lampinen-Skaug returned to Strømsgodset in April 2024, signing a contract until the end of the year. In May 2024, he joined Eidsvold Turn on a short-term loan, but returned to Strømsgodset after suffering a rib injury.

In January 2025, he signed a new two-year contract with Strømsgodset.

Lampinen-Skaug made his Eliteserien debut on 31 May 2025 in a 3–0 home defeat against HamKam.

Following Strømsgodset's relegation to the Norwegian First Division, he made further first-team appearances during the 2026 season. In June 2026, he signed a contract extension keeping him at the club until the end of 2028.

== Career statistics ==
As of 20 November 2026

Lampinen-Skaug's senior league appearances include matches for Strømsgodset's reserve team in the Norwegian lower divisions and for the first team in Eliteserien and the Norwegian First Division.
