= Strømsgodset Toppfotball =

Norwegian professional football club

Strømsgodset
- Full name: Strømsgodset Toppfotball
- Nickname: Godset
- Founded: 10 February 1907; 119 years ago
- Ground: Marienlyst Stadion
- Capacity: 8,935
- Chairman: Ann Sire Fjerdingstad
- Manager: Magne Hoset
- League: Eliteserien
- 2026: 1. divisjon, 1st of 16 (promoted)
- Website: www.godset.no
Home colours	Away colours

Strømsgodset Toppfotball is a Norwegian professional football club based in Gulskogen, Drammen, competing in the Norwegian First Division. It is part of the multi-sports club Strømsgodset IF, founded on February 10, 1907.

The football team rose to prominence in the late 1960s and early 1970s, led by young striker Steinar Pettersen and his teammates, known as the "Rødgata Boys" (named after their street in Drammen). They climbed from the fourth tier to the top flight in a few years, winning the league title in 1970 and the Norwegian Cup in 1969, 1970, and 1973.

The following decades were challenging, with the club even dropping to the third tier in 1986. This setback marked a turning point, and they returned to the top flight in 1989. In 1991, they won their fourth Norwegian Cup, but the 1990s remained turbulent with promotions and relegations, including winning a bronze medal in 1997 despite losing the cup final the same year

By 2005, financial troubles almost led to bankruptcy. However, local investors stepped in, sparking a new era of success. Strømsgodset returned to Tippeligaen, won the Norwegian Cup in 2010, and steadily improved. After finishing second in 2012, they secured their second league title in 2013.

== Home ground ==
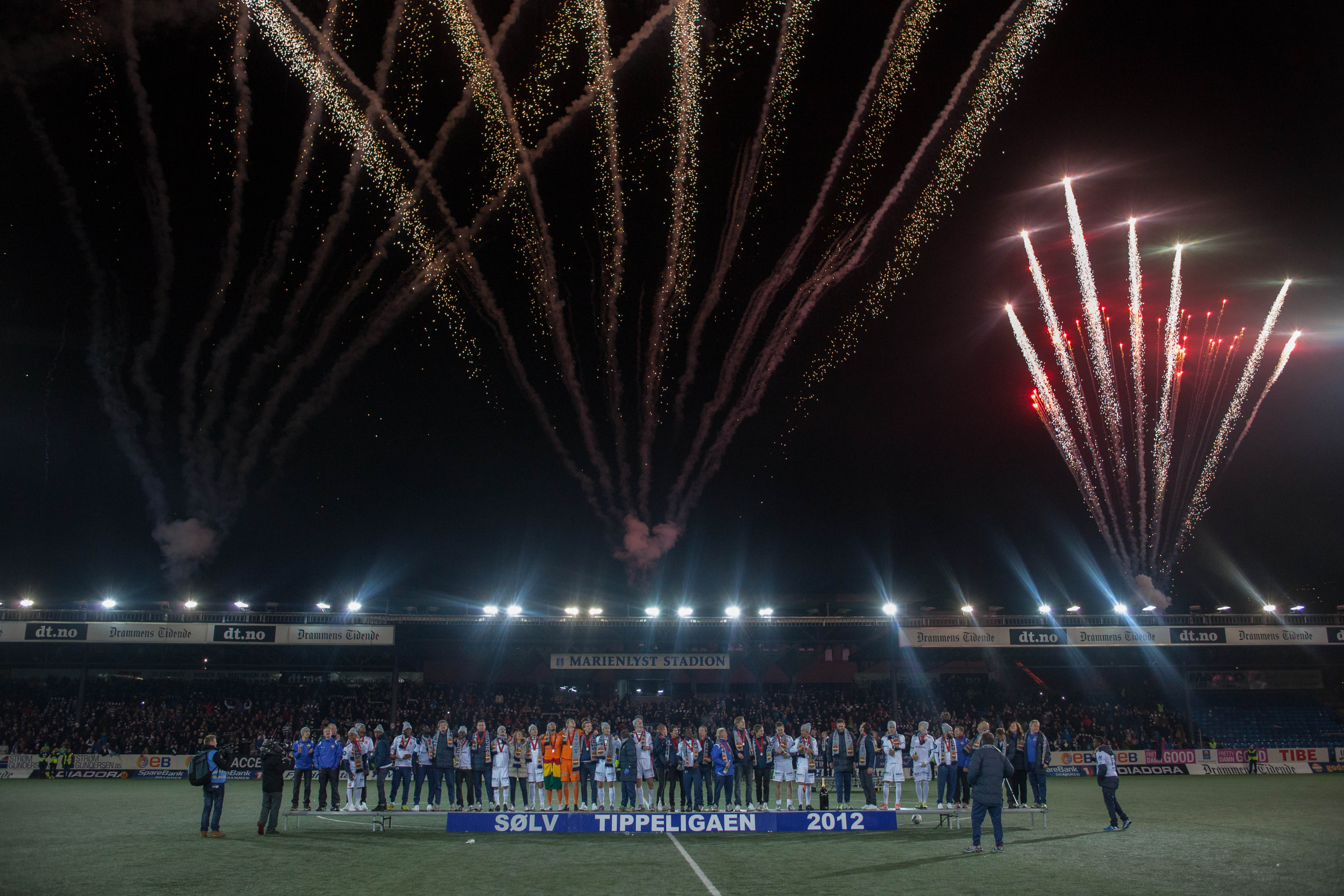
Fireworks over stadium

Strømsgodset Toppfotball play their home games at Marienlyst Stadium. The stadium has been rebuilt several times, most recently with a new south end ("Klokkesvingen") in 2014. There, safe standing (rail seats) was installed, which increased the capacity to 8,935 in matches where standing supporters are allowed. Safe standing has also been installed in the north end. When an all-seating stadium is required, the capacity is 8,060.

Record attendance for the club is 16,687 against Rosenborg BK in 1969. However, local rivals Mjøndalen holds the all-time record from a Cup semi final tie versus Viking in 1949, by approximately another thousand.

The stadium often goes under the name of "Gamle Gress" (meaning "Old turf")

Field measurements are 106 m x 68 m.

The turf has now been replaced with an artificial grass surface.

Marienlyst Stadium has frequently been used in Norway U21 International matches, and on 16 October 2012 when Norway U21 beat France U21 5–3 at Marienlyst and qualified for the 2013 UEFA European Under-21 Football Championship, after France won 1–0 in the first play-off match.

== Honours ==
- Eliteserien
  - Champions (2): 1970, 2013
  - Runners-up: 2012, 2015
  - Third place: 1969, 1972, 1997
- Norwegian Cup
  - Winners (5): 1969, 1970, 1973, 1991, 2010
  - Runners-up: 1993, 1997, 2018
- 1. divisjon
  - Winners (2): 2006, 2026

== Strømsgodset in Europe ==
Season	Competition	Round	Opponents	Home	Away	Aggregate
1970–71	European Cup Winners' Cup	1R	(France) Nantes	0–5	3–2	3–7
1971–72	European Cup	1R	(England) Arsenal	1–3	0–4	1–7
1973–74	UEFA Cup	1R	(England) Leeds United	1–1	1–6	2–7
1974–75	European Cup Winners' Cup	1R	(England) Liverpool	0–1	0–11	0–12
1992–93	European Cup Winners' Cup	QR	(Israel) Hapoel Petah Tikva	0–2	0–2	0–4
1998–99	UEFA Cup	2Q	(Israel) Hapoel Tel Aviv	1–0 (a.e.t.)	0–1	1–1 (4–2 p)
1998–99	UEFA Cup	1R	(England) Aston Villa	0–3	2–3	2–6
2011–12	UEFA Europa League	3Q	(Spain) Atlético Madrid	0–2	1–2	1–4
2013–14	UEFA Europa League	2Q	(Hungary) Debreceni VSC	2–2	3–0	5–2
2013–14	UEFA Europa League	3Q	(Czech Republic) FK Jablonec	1–3	1–2	2–5
2014–15	UEFA Champions League	2Q	(Romania) Steaua București	0–1	0–2	0–3
2015–16	UEFA Europa League	1Q	(Albania) FK Partizani	3–1	1–0	4–1
2015–16	UEFA Europa League	2Q	(Czech Republic) Mladá Boleslav	0–1	2–1	2–2 (a)
2015–16	UEFA Europa League	3Q	(Croatia) Hajduk Split	0–2	0–2	0–4
2016–17	UEFA Europa League	2Q	(Denmark) SønderjyskE	2–2 (a.e.t.)	1–2	3–4

== Recent history ==
Season		Pos.	Pl.	W	D	L	GS	GA	P	Cup	Notes
2009	Tippeligaen	12	30	10	6	14	40	42	36	Second round	
2010	Tippeligaen	7	30	13	4	13	51	59	43	Winner	
2011	Tippeligaen	8	30	12	9	9	44	43	45	Fourth round	
2012	Tippeligaen	2	30	17	7	6	62	40	58	Quarter-final	
2013	Tippeligaen	1	30	19	6	5	66	26	63	Second round	
2014	Tippeligaen	4	30	15	5	10	48	42	50	Third round	
2015	Tippeligaen	2	30	17	6	7	67	44	57	Third round	
2016	Tippeligaen	7	30	12	8	10	44	40	44	Semi-Final	
2017	Eliteserien	4	30	14	8	8	45	37	50	Third round	
2018	Eliteserien	13	30	7	10	13	46	48	31	Runners-up	
2019	Eliteserien	11	30	8	8	14	41	54	32	Third round	
2020	Eliteserien	13	30	7	10	13	41	57	31	Cancelled	
2021	Eliteserien	9	30	9	9	12	43	43	36	Semi-final	
2022	Eliteserien	12	30	9	6	15	44	55	33	Second round	
2023	Eliteserien	7	30	13	3	14	37	35	42	Fourth round	
2024	Eliteserien	7	30	10	8	12	32	40	38	Fourth round	
2025	Eliteserien	↓ 15	30	6	2	22	37	72	20	Second round	Relegated to the 1. divisjon
2026	1. divisjon	↑ 1st	30	20	6	4	82	36	66	Third round	Promoted to the Eliteserien

== Players and staff ==
=== First team squad ===
As of 27 August 2026

Note: Flags indicate national team as defined under FIFA eligibility rules; some limited exceptions apply. Players may hold more than one non-FIFA nationality.

No.	Pos.	Nation	Player
1	GK	FRO	Mattias Lamhauge
3	DF	DEN	Victor Dedes
4	DF	NOR	Aleksander van der Spa
5	DF	NOR	Bent Sørmo
8	MF	KOS	Kreshnik Krasniqi
9	FW	NOR	Elias Melkersen
10	MF	NOR	Herman Stengel (vice-captain)
11	FW	DEN	Sebastian Pingel
12	GK	NOR	Simo Lampinen-Skaug
14	FW	NOR	Ole Enersen
15	MF	NOR	Andreas Heredia-Randen

No.	Pos.	Nation	Player
16	MF	NOR	Fredrik Ardraa
17	MF	DEN	Jonathan Moalem (on loan from Copenhagen)
19	MF	NOR	André Stavås Skistad
22	MF	NOR	Kent-Are Antonsen
23	FW	NOR	Erik Ingebrethsen
25	DF	NOR	Jesper Taaje
26	DF	NOR	Lars-Christopher Vilsvik
39	FW	NOR	Mats Spiten
71	DF	NOR	Gustav Valsvik (captain)
77	FW	NOR	Marcus Mehnert
80	FW	NOR	Gustav Wikheim

=== Coaching staff ===
As of 6 February 2026

Head coach	Magne Hoset
Assistant coach	Bjørn Helge Riise; Jimmy Brinksby
Fitness coach	Andreas Hollingen
Goalkeeping coach	Torstein Jelsa
Player developer	Kjetil Lundebakken
Main physio	Eirik Pettersen
Physio	Sindre Arnås Jødahl
Orthopedist	Marianne Olsson
Doctor	Erik Dag Knudsen

=== Administrative staff ===
Chairman	Ann Sire Fjerdingstad
Managing director	Magne Jordan Nilsen
Sports director	Jackie Rasmussen

== Notable Players ==
- Martin Ødegaard

== Head coaches ==
- Yngvar Lindbo-Hansen (1952)
- Karl Olav Dahlbak (1953)
- Johan Wiig (1954)
- Gunnar Hovde (1955–59)
- Kåre Nielsen (1960)
- Erling Carlsen (1961)
- Gunnar Hovde (1962)
- Einar Larsen (1963–66)
- Ragnar Larsen (1967)
- Asmund Sandli (1968)
- Einar Larsen (1969–70)
- Steinar Johansen (1971)
- Knut Osnes (1972)
- Erik Eriksen (1973–74)
- Einar Larsen (1975)
- Thorodd Presberg (1976–77)
- Arild Mathisen (1978)
- Steinar Pettersen (1979)
- Terje Dokken (1980–82)
- Einar Sigmundstad (1983–84)
- Bjørn Odmar Andersen (1985)
- Erik Eriksen (1986)
- Terje Dokken (1987–88)
- Einar Sigmundstad (1989–90)
- Tor Røste Fossen (1991)
- Hallvar Thoresen (1992)
- Dag Vidar Kristoffersen (Jan 1, 1993–Dec 31, 1998)
- Jens Martin Støten (Jan 1, 1999–Dec 31, 1999)
- Arne Dokken (Jan 1, 2000–Dec 31, 2002)
- Vidar Davidsen (2003–04)
- Anders Jacobsen (Jan 1, 2005–Dec 31, 2005)
- Dag Eilev Fagermo (Jan 1, 2006–Dec 31, 2007)
- Ronny Deila (Jan 1, 2008–14)
- David Nielsen (June 7, 2014 – May 26, 2015)
- Bjørn Petter Ingebretsen (May 26, 2015– Oct 13, 2016)
- Tor Ole Skullerud (Oct 18, 2016 – June 6, 2018)
- Bjørn Petter Ingebretsen (July 30, 2018 – May 15, 2019)
- Henrik Pedersen (June 20, 2019 – Apr 9, 2021)
- Håkon Wibe-Lund & Bjørn Petter Ingebretsen (Apr 11, 2021 – Dec 31, 2022)
- Jørgen Isnes (Jan 1, 2023 – May 26, 2025)
- Dag Eilev Fagermo (June 10, 2025– Jan 19, 2026)
