= Steven Gaote =

Bulgarian footballer (born 2008)

Personal information
- Full name: Steven Gerard Jean Yves Gaote
- Date of birth: 19 February 2008 (age 18)
- Place of birth: Sofia, Bulgaria
- Height: 1.78 m (5 ft 10 in)
- Position: Forward

Team information
- Current team: Rennes

Youth career
- 2013–2024: Levski Sofia
- 2024–: Rennes

Senior career*
| Years | Team | Apps | (Gls) |
| 2023–2024 | Levski Sofia II | 3 | (0) |
| 2025– | Rennes B | 4 | (0) |

International career^{‡}
| 2022–2023 | Bulgaria U15 | 5 | (4) |
| 2023–2024 | Bulgaria U16 | 3 | (2) |
| 2023–2025 | Bulgaria U17 | 9 | (2) |
- * Club domestic league appearances and goals as of 07:38, 30 March 2026 (UTC) ‡ National team caps and goals as of 10:51, 1 April 2024 (UTC)

Steven Gerard Jean Yves Gaote (Bulgarian: Стивън Жерард Жан Ив Гаоте, romanized: Stivǎn Zherard Zhan Iv Gaote; born 19 February 2008) is a Bulgarian footballer who plays as a forward for French club Rennes.

== Club career ==
Born in Sofia to an Ivorian father and a Bulgarian mother, Gaote joined the academy of Levski Sofia in 2013, and progressed through the ranks, notably scoring 35 goals in 38 games throughout the 2021–22 season. In May 2023, he was invited by interim first-team coach Elin Topuzakov to train with the Levski senior squad for the first time. In June of the same year, he stated that he hoped to be involved with the first team again in the 2023–24 season. He made his debut for the second team on 11 November 2023 in a Third League match against Minyor Pernik.

In January 2024 Gaote returned from trials with Red Bull Salzburg and joined again Levski's first team winter training camp. He announced he would leave Levski in April 2024, after he refused to sign a professional contract with the team and was expelled from all team activities.

On 10 June 2024, he officially signed a contract with French club Rennes.

== International career ==
Gaote represented Bulgaria at under-15 and under-16 levels in a friendly tournaments. In May 2023, he was called up for Bulgaria U17.

== Career statistics ==
As of 18 February 2024

| Club performance | | | League | | Cup | | Continental | | Other | | Total | |
| Club | League | Season | Apps | Goals | Apps | Goals | Apps | Goals | Apps | Goals | Apps | Goals |
|---|---|---|---|---|---|---|---|---|---|---|---|---|
| Levski Sofia II | Third League | 2023–24 | 3 | 0 | – | | – | | – | | 3 | 0 |
| Career statistics | | | 3 | 0 | 0 | 0 | 0 | 0 | 0 | 0 | 3 | 0 |
