= Eman Košpo =

Bosnian footballer (born 2007)

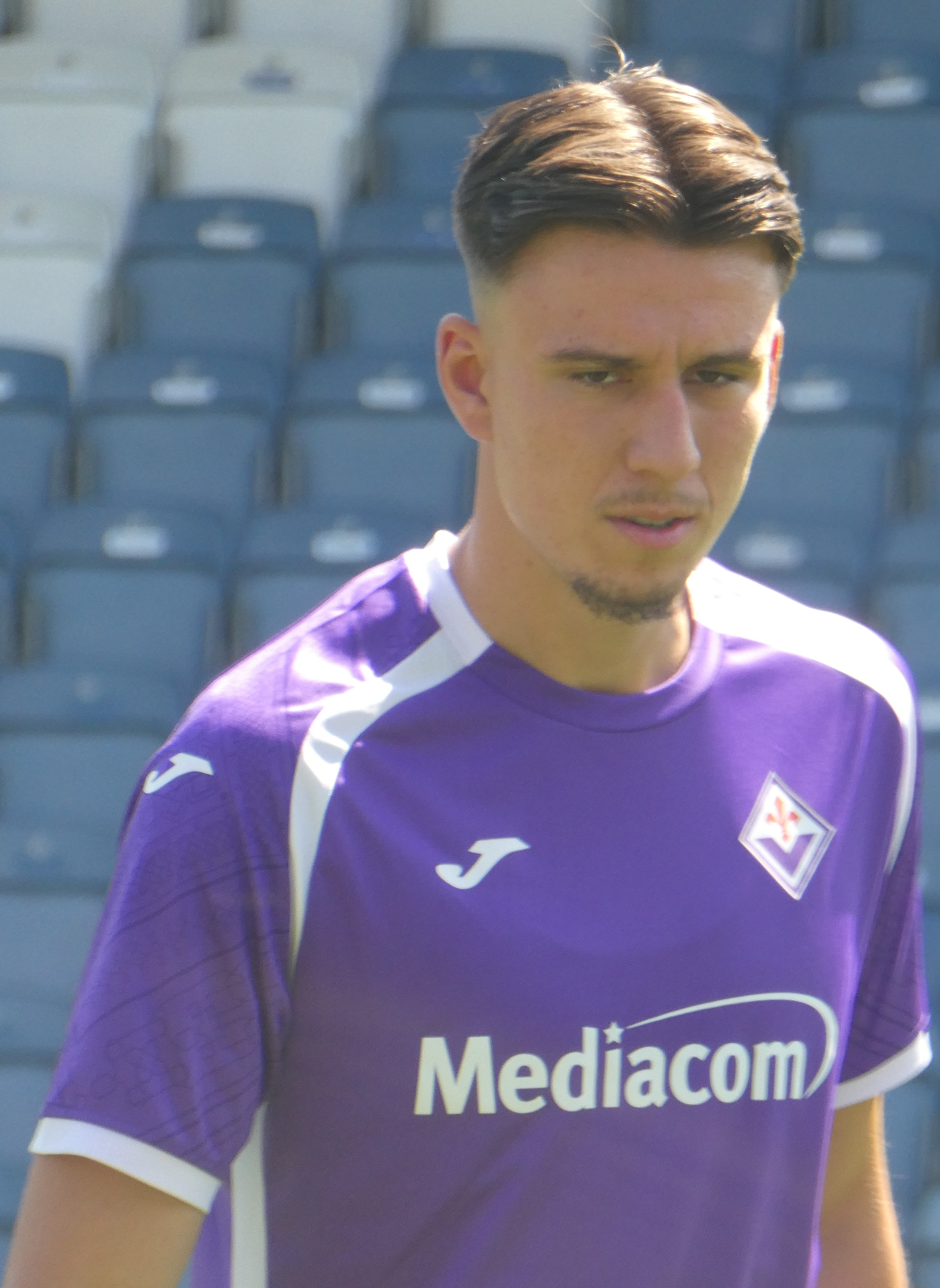
- Košpo with Fiorentina in 2026

Personal information
- Date of birth: 17 May 2007 (age 19)
- Place of birth: Suhr, Switzerland
- Height: 1.91 m (6 ft 3 in)
- Position: Centre-back

Team information
- Current team: Mantova (on loan from Fiorentina)
- Number: 75

Youth career
- FC Gränichen
- 2018–2020: FC Aarau
- 2020–2023: Grasshopper
- 2023–2025: Barcelona
- 2025–: Fiorentina

Senior career*
Years	Team	Apps	(Gls)
2025–	Fiorentina	0	(0)
2026–	→ Mantova (loan)	1	(0)

International career^{‡}
2022	Switzerland U15	2	(0)
2022–2023	Switzerland U16	12	(1)
2023–2024	Switzerland U17	6	(1)
2024	Switzerland U18	10	(0)
2026–	Bosnia and Herzegovina U21	4	(0)
2025–	Bosnia and Herzegovina	1	(0)
- * Club domestic league appearances and goals as of 30 August 2026 ‡ National team caps and goals as of 6 October 2026

Eman Košpo (pronounced [ěman kôːʃpo]; born 17 May 2007) is a professional footballer who plays as a centre-back for Serie B club Mantova, on loan from Fiorentina. Born in Switzerland, he plays for the Bosnia and Herzegovina national team.

A former Swiss youth international, Košpo made his senior international debut for Bosnia and Herzegovina in 2025.

== Club career ==
=== Early career ===
Košpo started playing football at a local club, before joining FC Aarau's youth setup in 2018. In 2020, he switched to Grasshopper's youth academy. In July 2023, he moved to Barcelona's youth setup.

=== Fiorentina ===
In July 2025, Košpo was transferred to Italian side Fiorentina for an undisclosed fee.

In August 2026, he was sent on a season-long loan to Mantova. He made his professional debut against Empoli on 30 August at the age of 19.

== International career ==
Despite representing Switzerland at various youth levels and captaining them at the under-17 level under coach Luigi Pisino, Košpo decided to play for Bosnia and Herzegovina at the senior level.

In August 2025, his request to change sports citizenship from Swiss to Bosnian was approved by FIFA. Earlier that month, he received his first senior call up, for 2026 FIFA World Cup qualifiers against San Marino and Austria. He debuted against the former on 6 September.

== Career statistics ==
=== Club ===
As of match played 30 August 2026

Appearances and goals by club, season and competition
Club	Season	League			National Cup		Continental		Total	
Club	Season	Division	Apps	Goals	Apps	Goals	Apps	Goals	Apps	Goals
Mantova (loan)	2026–27	Serie B	1	0	0	0	—		1	0
Career total			1	0	0	0	—		1	0

=== International ===
As of match played 6 September 2025

Appearances and goals by national team and year
National team	Year	Apps	Goals
Bosnia and Herzegovina
Bosnia and Herzegovina	2025	1	0
Total		1	0
