= Finland national under-16 football team =

National U-16 association football team

There is an under-16 youth team associated with the Finland national football team.

== UEFA European U-16 Championship record ==
Year	Round	Pld	W	D*	L	GF	GA
(Italy) 1982	Third place match	2	0	2	0	1	1
(West Germany) 1984	did not qualify						
(Hungary) 1985	did not qualify						
(Greece) 1986	did not qualify						
(France) 1987	did not qualify						
(Spain) 1988	Group Stage	3	1	0	2	2	4
(Denmark) 1989	did not qualify						
(East Germany) 1990	did not qualify						
(Switzerland) 1991	Group Stage	3	1	1	1	3	3
(Cyprus) 1992	Group Stage	3	1	0	2	2	4
(Turkey) 1993	did not qualify						
(Republic of Ireland) 1994	did not qualify						
(Belgium) 1995	did not qualify						
(Austria) 1996	did not qualify						
(Germany) 1997	did not qualify						
(Scotland) 1998	Group Stage	3	1	0	2	2	3
(Czech Republic) 1999	Group Stage	3	0	0	3	5	10
(Israel) 2000	Group Stage	3	0	1	2	7	14
(England) 2001	Group Stage	3	0	0	3	1	10
2002-	See Finland national under-17 football team						
Total	8/19	23	4	4	15	23	49

*Draws include knockout matches decided on penalty kicks.
**Gold background colour indicates that the tournament was won.
***Red border colour indicates tournament was held on home soil.

== Current squad ==
The following 22 players were named in the squad for the 2023 UEFA Under-16 Development Tournament in May.

Caps and goals are correct as of 7 October 2022, after the match against Estonia.

No.	Pos.	Player	Date of birth (age)	Caps	Goals	Club
	GK	Ukko Happonen	13 March 2007 (age 19)	2	0	(Italian Football Federation) Bologna
	GK	Osku Maukonen	15 February 2007 (age 19)	2	0	(Football Association of Finland) Lahti
	DF	Adam Le Goff-Conan	21 April 2007 (age 19)	4	0	(Football Association of Finland) HJK
	DF	Maxim Nazari	20 February 2007 (age 19)	3	0	(Football Association of Finland) HJK
	DF	Santeri Romppanen	10 September 2007 (age 19)	3	0	(Football Association of Finland) PK Keski-Uusimaa
	DF	Eetu Turkki	31 January 2007 (age 19)	3	0	(Football Association of Finland) Ilves
	DF	Roope Heikkilä		0	0	(Football Association of Finland) Honka
	DF	Kalle Huhta		0	0	(Football Association of Finland) VPS
	DF	Axel Sandler	5 January 2007 (age 19)	0	0	(Italian Football Federation) AC Milan
	MF	Matias Siltanen	29 March 2007 (age 19)	4	0	(Football Association of Finland) KuPS
	MF	Eemil Tanninen	4 April 2007 (age 19)	4	0	(Football Association of Finland) JIPPO
	MF	David Weiss	29 May 2007 (age 19)	4	0	(Italian Football Federation) Sassuolo
	MF	Reko Huhtamäki	23 January 2007 (age 19)	0	0	(Football Association of Finland) KäPa
	MF	Miika Mahlamäki		0	0	(Football Association of Finland) JJK
	MF	Tomas Sovelius		0	0	(Football Association of Finland) Ilves
	MF	Adam Zahedi		0	0	(Football Association of Finland) PK Keski-Uusimaa
	FW	Sonosi Daldum	19 March 2007 (age 19)	5	2	(Italian Football Federation) Sassuolo
	FW	Sulo Ketola	14 February 2007 (age 19)	4	4	(German Football Association) Borussia Mönchengladbach
	FW	Taavi Koukkumäki	16 April 2007 (age 19)	4	2	(German Football Association) Borussia Mönchengladbach
	FW	Djoully Nzoko	11 October 2007 (age 19)	4	0	(Football Association of Finland) Inter Turku
	FW	Martin Kirilov	8 August 2007 (age 19)	0	0	(Italian Football Federation) Torino
	FW	Sander Korsunov		0	0	(Football Association of Finland) Ilves
	FW	Arttu Tulehmo	2 May 2007 (age 19)	0	0	(Football Association of Finland) Ilves
