= Oskari Multala =

Finnish footballer (born 2007)

Personal information
- Date of birth: 13 March 2007 (age 19)
- Place of birth: Järvenpää, Finland
- Height: 1.87 m (6 ft 2 in)
- Position: Midfielder

Team information
- Current team: Ilves
- Number: 22

Youth career
- –2019: JäPS
- 2020–2024: PK Keski-Uusimaa

Senior career*
Years	Team	Apps	(Gls)
2024–	Ilves II	36	(3)
2025–	Ilves	21	(1)

International career^{‡}
2023–2024	Finland U17	17	(1)
2024–2025	Finland U18	3	(0)
2025–	Finland U19	9	(0)
- * Club domestic league appearances and goals as of 13 November 2026 ‡ National team caps and goals as of 18 July 2026

Oskari Multala (born 13 March 2007) is a Finnish professional football player who plays as a midfielder for Veikkausliiga side Ilves and the Finland national under-19 football team.

== Club career ==
Multala spent his early youth career with JäPS and PK Keski-Uusimaa before joining Ilves in July 2024. Initially playing primarily for the club's reserve side, Ilves II, he broke into the first team during the 2025 season, making appearances in both the Veikkausliiga and the UEFA Conference League qualifiers.

After earning significant playing time during the winter Finnish League Cup campaign, where he scored against SJK, Multala signed a two-year contract extension in March 2026, tying him to Ilves until the end of the 2028 season.

== International career ==
Multala has represented Finland at various youth international levels, including the under-17 and under-18 national teams. As a core player for the Finland national under-19 football team, he featured in the team's 2026 UEFA European Under-19 Championship qualification matches against opponents including the Netherlands and Spain.
