= Sonosi Daldum =

Finnish footballer (born 2007)

Personal information
- Date of birth: 19 March 2007 (age 19)
- Place of birth: Kuopio, Finland
- Position: Centre-forward

Team information
- Current team: Sassuolo U20
- Number: 13

Youth career
- –2022: KuPS
- 2023–2024: → Sassuolo (loan)
- 2024–: Sassuolo

Senior career*
Years	Team	Apps	(Gls)
2023–2024	KuPS II	6	(3)

International career^{‡}
2022–2023	Finland U16	5	(2)
2023–2024	Finland U17	9	(3)
2024–	Finland U18	5	(3)
- * Club domestic league appearances and goals as of 21 October 2023 ‡ National team caps and goals as of 22 November 2024

Sonosi Daldum (born 19 March 2007) is a Finnish footballer who plays as a forward for Italian Sassuolo U20 academy team.

== Career ==
Daldum played in the youth sector of Kuopion Palloseura (KuPS), before making his senior debut when aged 16 with the club's reserve team KuPS II in the third tier Kakkonen on 4 August 2023, in a loss against Oulun Luistinseura. He played in six games and scored three goals for the team, before he was loaned out to Italian club Sassuolo in the early September 2023. He was registered to their U17 academy squad. After the season, he joined Sassuolo U18 team on a permanent transfer for an undisclosed fee.

== International career ==
Daldum has represented Finland at under-16 and under-17 youth national teams.

Daldum was part of Finland U16 squad that won the friendly tournament Baltic Cup in July 2023, scoring one goal in three games.

On 4 October 2023, he was named in the Finland U17 squad in the 2024 UEFA European Under-17 Championship qualification tournament. In the tournament Finland drew with Ukraine and Germany 2–2 and 1–1, respectively, before winning Liechtenstein 3–0, placing 2nd in the group and advancing to the Elite round. Daldum scored once in three games, an equaliser against Germany.

== Personal life ==
Born in Finland, Daldum is of Sudanese descent.

== Career statistics ==
As of 18 August 2024.

Appearances and goals by club, season and competition
Club	Season	League			Cup		League cup		Europe		Total	
Club	Season	Division	Apps	Goals	Apps	Goals	Apps	Goals	Apps	Goals	Apps	Goals
KuPS Akatemia	2023	Kakkonen	6	3	–		–		–		6	3
Career total			6	3	0	0	0	0	0	0	6	3

== Honours ==
Finland U16

- Baltic Cup: 2023
