= Oumar Camara (footballer, born 2007) =

French footballer (born 2007)

Personal information
- Date of birth: 11 May 2007 (age 19)
- Place of birth: Aubervilliers, France
- Height: 1.76 m (5 ft 9 in)
- Positions: Winger; forward

Team information
- Current team: Vitória SC
- Number: 19

Youth career
- –2017: Olympique De Pantin
- 2017–2020: FC 93 Bobigny-Bagnolet-Gagny
- 2020–2025: Paris Saint-Germain

Senior career*
Years	Team	Apps	(Gls)
2025–	Vitória de Guimarães	30	(5)

International career^{‡}
2023–2024	France U17	7	(1)
2024	France U18	3	(0)
- * Club domestic league appearances and goals as of 25 May 2026 ‡ National team caps and goals as of 8 September 2024

Oumar Camara (born 11 May 2007) is a French professional footballer who plays as a winger or forward for Primeira Liga club Vitória de Guimarães.

== Early life ==
Camara was born on 11 May 2007 in Aubervilliers, France. Of Malian and Ivorian descent through his parents, he has been nicknamed "Capi".

== Club career ==
As a youth player, Camara joined the youth academy of French side Olympique De Pantin. Following his stint there, he joined the youth academy of French side FC 93 Bobigny-Bagnolet-Gagny in 2017.

During the summer of 2020, he joined the youth academy of French Ligue 1 side Paris Saint-Germain, helping the club's under-19 team win the league title. Ahead of the 2025–26 season, he signed for Portuguese side Vitória de Guimarães. On 10 January 2026, Camara came on from the bench in the Portuguese Taça da Liga final against Braga in which Vitória Guimarães won 2-1.

== Honours ==
Vitória SC

- Taça da Liga: 2025–26

== International career ==
Camara is a France youth international. On 4 September 2024, he debuted for the France national under-18 football team during a 2–2 home friendly draw with the Switzerland national under-18 football team, with France winning 6–4 on penalties.

== Style of play ==
Camara plays as a winger or forward. He is right-footed, and has received comparisons to Cameroon international Samuel Eto'o.
