= Jakub Pira =

Footballer (born 2007)

Personal information
- Date of birth: 24 November 2007 (age 18)
- Place of birth: Ostrava, Czech Republic
- Height: 1.93 m (6 ft 4 in)
- Position: Striker

Team information
- Current team: Karviná (on loan from Baník Ostrava)

Youth career
- 2013–2020: Baník Ostrava
- 2020–2022: Vítkovice
- 2022–2023: Karviná
- 2023–2025: Baník Ostrava

Senior career*
Years	Team	Apps	(Gls)
2025–	Baník Ostrava B	22	(9)
2025–	Baník Ostrava	26	(1)
2026–	→ Karviná (loan)	0	(0)

International career^{‡}
2023–2024	Slovakia U17	11	(1)
2024	Slovakia U18	5	(0)
2025–	Slovakia U21	2	(0)
- * Club domestic league appearances and goals as of 25 May 2026 ‡ National team caps and goals as of 14 October 2025

Jakub Pira (born 24 November 2007) is a professional footballer who plays as a striker for Czech National Football League club Karviná on loan from Baník Ostrava. Born in the Czech Republic, he has represented Slovakia internationally at youth level.

== Career ==
Pira was born on 24 November 2007 in Ostrava, Czech Republic, to Slovak mother, originally from Stropkov and to Slovak father, originally from Bardejov.

Pira joined the youth setup at FC Baník Ostrava in 2013. He made his professional senior debut for Baník Ostrava B against Táborsko on 2 March 2025. After he netted nine goals for a reserve team, he was promoted into the Ostrava's first team. He made his debut for Baník Ostrava against SK Sigma Olomouc on 31 August 2025. He scored a goal in his third match for the first team against FK Mladá Boleslav on 21 September 2025.

In November 2025, he has acquired Czech citizenship and can choose which country he will represent.
