= Jonathan Moalem =

Danish footballer (born 2007)

Personal information
- Full name: Jonathan Christensen Moalem
- Date of birth: 1 February 2007 (age 19)
- Height: 1.76 m (5 ft 9 in)
- Position: Midfielder

Team information
- Current team: Strømsgodset (on loan from F.C. Copenhagen)
- Number: 17

Youth career
- 2011–2025: KB / F.C. Copenhagen

Senior career*
Years	Team	Apps	(Gls)
2025–	F.C. Copenhagen	0	(0)
2026–	→ Strømsgodset (loan)	2	(0)

International career^{‡}
2022–2023	Denmark U16	12	(0)
2023–2024	Denmark U17	17	(3)
2024	Denmark U18	2	(0)
- * Club domestic league appearances and goals as of 20 November 2026 ‡ National team caps and goals as of 20 November 2026

Jonathan Christensen Moalem (born 1 February 2007) is a Danish professional footballer who plays as a midfielder for Norwegian First Division club Strømsgodset, on loan from Danish Superliga club F.C. Copenhagen.

== Club career ==
=== Copenhagen ===
Moalem began playing football at the age of four for Kjøbenhavns Boldklub (KB), the parent club of F.C. Copenhagen. He progressed through Copenhagen's youth academy, representing the club at various age levels and captaining several of its youth teams.

He signed his first contract with Copenhagen on his fifteenth birthday in February 2022. In June 2024, he signed another contract extension following his promotion to the club's under-19 team.

On 6 June 2025, Copenhagen announced that Moalem had signed a new contract until the summer of 2030 and would be promoted to the club's first-team squad ahead of the 2025–26 season. He had scored five goals in 21 appearances in the Danish under-19 league during the preceding season.

On 4 November 2025, Moalem scored in Copenhagen's 3–2 away victory over Tottenham Hotspur in the UEFA Youth League. Following the match, he told Danish sports newspaper Tipsbladet that the goal was particularly meaningful after a period affected by injuries.

Although he was part of the senior squad during the 2025–26 season, he did not make a competitive first-team appearance for Copenhagen.

=== Loan to Strømsgodset ===
On 6 August 2026, Moalem joined Norwegian First Division club Strømsgodset on a one-year loan until the summer of 2027, with an option to make the transfer permanent. The move was first reported by Danish newspaper Tipsbladet, citing its own information. He was assigned the number 17 shirt.

Moalem made two league appearances for Strømsgodset in August 2026. In his first start for the club, against Ranheim, he won a penalty after being fouled by goalkeeper Jacob Storevik. He subsequently suffered a hamstring injury and was substituted shortly before half-time.

On 20 August 2026, Strømsgodset announced that the injury would keep him out for the remainder of the season.

== International career ==
Moalem has represented Denmark at under-16, under-17 and under-18 levels.

He made 12 appearances for the Danish under-16 national team before progressing to the under-17 side, for which he scored three goals in 17 appearances.

In 2024, he was part of Denmark's squad at the 2024 UEFA European Under-17 Championship in Cyprus. Denmark reached the semi-finals of the competition before being eliminated by Italy.

Moalem subsequently made two appearances for Denmark's under-18 national team.

== Career statistics ==
As of 20 November 2026

Appearances and goals by club, season and competition
Club	Season	League		
Club	Season	Division	Apps	Goals
F.C. Copenhagen	2025–26	Danish Superliga	0	0
Strømsgodset (loan)	2026	1. divisjon	2	0
Career total			2	0
