= Owen Stirton =

Scottish footballer (born 2007)

Personal information
- Full name: Owen Lucas Stirton
- Date of birth: 30 January 2007 (age 19)
- Place of birth: Forfar, Scotland
- Position: Striker

Team information
- Current team: Ayr United (on loan from Dundee United)
- Number: 7

Youth career
- Dundee United

Senior career*
Years	Team	Apps	(Gls)
2024–	Dundee United	9	(1)
2025	→ Montrose (loan)	14	(9)
2026	→ Airdrieonians (loan)	6	(0)
2026–	→ Ayr United (loan)	15	(3)

International career^{‡}
2023	Scotland U17	2	(1)
- * Club domestic league appearances and goals as of 21:22, 20 November 2026 (UTC) ‡ National team caps and goals as of 16:46, 22 June 2025 (UTC)

Owen Stirton (born 30 January 2007) is a Scottish professional footballer who plays as a striker for Scottish Championship club Ayr United on loan from Scottish Premiership club Dundee United.

== Club career ==
=== Dundee United ===
Stirton signed his first professional contract with Dundee United in May 2023.

On 9 November 2024 Stirton scored his first professional goal for Dundee United, scoring with his first touch in a 3–0 home win over Ross County.

In January 2025 Stirton signed a two-year contract extension with Dundee United.

Stirton scored his first goal of the 2025–26 season in a 2–1 away defeat to Kilmarnock in the Scottish League Cup.

==== Montrose (loan) ====
In January 2025, Stirton joined Scottish League One club Montrose on loan until the end of the season.

Stirton scored on his Montrose debut in a 2–2 away draw with Annan Athletic. Stirton then followed this up by scoring a double in his second game and home debut for Montrose.

Stirton won the Scottish League One player of the month award for February 2025.

== International career ==
Stirton was called up to the Scottish International Under 17s team, making his debut and scoring his first international goal against Kazakhstan.

Stirton was called up to the Scottish International Under 19s team in March 2025.
