= Adrián Arnu =

Spanish footballer (born 2007)

Personal information
- Full name: Adrián Arnuncio Baquerín
- Date of birth: 4 March 2007 (age 19)
- Place of birth: Palencia, Spain
- Height: 1.85 m (6 ft 1 in)
- Position: Forward

Team information
- Current team: Valladolid

Youth career
- San Juanillo
- 2017–2023: Valladolid

Senior career*
Years	Team	Apps	(Gls)
2023–2025	Valladolid B	43	(6)
2024–	Valladolid	15	(0)
2026	→ Real Madrid C (loan)	13	(6)
2026	→ Real Madrid B (loan)	3	(0)

International career^{‡}
2023–	Spain U17	13	(9)
2023–	Spain U18	3	(0)
- * Club domestic league appearances and goals as of 7 May 2026 ‡ National team caps and goals as of 09:35, 22 April 2026 (UTC)

Adrián Arnuncio Baquerín (born 4 March 2007), known as Adrián Arnu or just Arnu, is a Spanish footballer who plays as a forward for Real Valladolid.

== Club career ==
Born in Palencia, Castile and León, Arnu joined Real Valladolid's youth sides in 2017, from local side CD San Juanillo. He made his senior debut with the reserves on 17 September 2023, coming on as a second-half substitute for Manu Pozo and scoring the winner in a 1–0 Segunda Federación away success over Real Oviedo Vetusta; aged 16 years and 197 days, he became the youngest player to feature for the B's at the time (he was later surpassed by Víctor Fernández in December, but remained the youngest to score).

Arnu made his first team debut on 11 May 2024, starting in a 0–0 Segunda División home draw against RCD Espanyol; aged 17 years, 2 months and 7 days, he became the second-youngest to debut with the main squad, surpassing Iván Fresneda and being only behind Luis Miguel Gail. Three days later, he renewed his contract until 2027. He made his La Liga debut on 20 December, replacing Marcos André late into a 3–0 away loss to Girona FC.

In July 2025, Arnu was promoted to the first team of Pucela, now in Segunda División, but was rarely used afterwards. On 21 January 2026, he was loaned to Real Madrid and was initially assigned to C-team in fourth division and made a brief appearance with Castilla in third division.

== International career ==
Arnu represented Spain at under-17 level.
