= José Reyes López =

Spanish footballer (born 2007)

Personal information
- Full name: José Antonio Reyes López
- Date of birth: 15 October 2007 (age 19)
- Place of birth: Madrid, Spain
- Height: 1.70 m (5 ft 7 in)
- Position: Forward

Team information
- Current team: Real Madrid C
- Number: 19

Youth career
- 2013–2017: Legamar
- 2017–2019: Leganés
- 2019–2026: Real Madrid

Senior career*
Years	Team	Apps	(Gls)
2026–	Real Madrid C	0	(0)

International career^{‡}
2022	Spain U15	5	(0)
2022–2023	Spain U16	9	(4)
2023–	Spain U17	7	(4)
- * Club domestic league appearances and goals as of 06:19, 8 August 2026 (UTC) ‡ National team caps and goals as of 18:24, 25 January 2024 (UTC)

José Antonio Reyes López (born 15 October 2007) is a Spanish professional footballer currently playing as a forward for Real Madrid's youth side.

== Early life ==
Reyes López was born in Madrid to former Spanish international footballer José Antonio Reyes.

== Club career ==
Reyes López began his footballing career with Legamar, spending four years before a stint in the Leganés academy. While at Leganés, Reyes López agreed a deal to join Real Madrid, the club his father had played for, on loan from English Premier League side Arsenal, in the 2006–07 season. After the death of his father on 1 June 2019, shortly before his transfer was set to go through, it was reported that Real Madrid club president, Florentino Pérez, had told El Chiringuito de Jugones sportscaster Cristobal Soria that he would personally look after Reyes López until he was eighteen years old. He played his last matches for Leganés' youth team at the La Liga Promises tournament in June 2019.

On his league debut for Real Madrid's 'Juvenil B' team, Reyes López scored a goal, raising his arms to the sky in a celebration dedicated to his father. Later in the same season, the Juvenil B team won the La Liga Promises tournament, with Reyes López scoring four goals in the final against Sevilla. He was awarded the golden boot, as well as the 'Most Valuable Player' award for the tournament, having scored nine goals in just six games. In June 2020, Reyes López joined the Lifepro football agency, run by former Real Madrid player Marcelo.

For the 2021–22 season, Reyes López was promoted to Real Madrid's 'Cadet A' side, playing in the side managed by Álvaro Arbeloa with players a year above him. He signed a contract extension in March 2022.

For the 2026–27 season, Reyes López was promoted to Real Madrid C in fourth tier Spanish Division.

== International career ==
Reyes López was called up to the Spain under-15 side for the first time in November 2021, replacing Real Betis player Álvaro Muñoz in the squad ahead of the Albin Garden tournament. He has since gone on to also represent the nation at under-16 and under-17 level.

== Career statistics ==
=== Club ===
As of match played 1 July 2026

Appearances and goals by club, season and competition
Club	Season	League			Cup		Europe		Other		Total	
Club	Season	Division	Apps	Goals	Apps	Goals	Apps	Goals	Apps	Goals	Apps	Goals
Real Madrid C	2026–27	Segunda Federación	0	0	—		—		—		0	0
Career total			0	0	0	0	0	0	0	0	0	0
