= Mihail Polendakov =

Bulgarian footballer (born 2007)

Personal information
- Full name: Mihail Yordanov Polendakov
- Date of birth: 5 June 2007 (age 19)
- Place of birth: Sofia, Bulgaria
- Height: 1.79 m (5 ft 10 in)
- Position: Right-back

Team information
- Current team: Ludogorets Razgrad (on loan from Sheffield United)
- Number: 22

Youth career
- 2013–2018: DIT Sofia
- 2018–2023: Septemvri Sofia

Senior career*
Years	Team	Apps	(Gls)
2022–2024	Septemvri Sofia II	24	(1)
2022–2025	Septemvri Sofia	40	(0)
2025–	Sheffield United	0	(0)
2026–	→ Ludogorets II (loan)	4	(0)
2026–	→ Ludogorets Razgrad (loan)	2	(0)

International career^{‡}
2022–2023	Bulgaria U16	5	(1)
2022–2024	Bulgaria U17	14	(2)
2024–	Bulgaria U19	3	(0)
2025–	Bulgaria U21	5	(0)
- * Club domestic league appearances and goals as of 07:29, 20 November 2026 (UTC) ‡ National team caps and goals as of 12:04, 6 September 2025 (UTC)

Mihail Yordanov Polendakov (Bulgarian: Михаил Йорданов Полендаков; born 5 June 2007) is a Bulgarian professional footballer who plays as a defender for Ludogorets Razgrad, on loan from EFL Championship club Sheffield United.

== Career ==
=== Septemvri Sofia ===
Polendakov began his career in the local DIT academy at the age of 6, which merged with Septemvri Sofia in 2015, with Mihail moving to the Septemvri in 2018. On 30 October 2022 he made his professional debut in a league match against Ludogorets Razgrad, at age of 15 years 04 months 25 days. On 30 April 2023 he signed his first professional contract with Septemvri. He went on trials with Red Bull Salzburg on 15 January 2024.

=== Sheffield United ===
On 22 July 2025, Polendakov signed for English Championship side Sheffield United for an undisclosed fee. Sheffield United reportedly utilised Artificial intelligence and data in the recruitment process which led to them signing Polendakov. Polendakov didn't make a single appearance for the Blades in his first season at the club. On 15 July 2026, he joined Ludogorets Razgrad on a season-long loan deal; the deal will become permanent if a certain criteria is met.

== Career statistics ==
=== Club ===
As of 30 December 2023

Club performance			League		Cup		Continental		Other		Total	
Club	League	Season	Apps	Goals	Apps	Goals	Apps	Goals	Apps	Goals	Apps	Goals
Bulgaria			League		Bulgarian Cup		Europe		Other (Note: Includes Promotion/relegation play-off matches.)		Total	
Septemvri Sofia	First League	2022–23	4	0	0	0	–		–		4	0
Septemvri Sofia	Second League	2023–24	1	0	0	0	–		–		1	0
Septemvri Sofia	Total		5	0	0	0	0	0	0	0	5	0
Career statistics			5	0	0	0	0	0	0	0	5	1
