= 2000 UEFA European Under-16 Championship squads =

Football tournament squads

== Group A ==
=== England ===
Head Coach: Les Reed

No.	Pos.	Player	Date of birth (age)	Club
1	GK	Lee Grant	27 January 1983 (aged 17)	(The Football Association) Derby County
2	DF	Neil Austin	26 April 1983 (aged 17)	(The Football Association) Barnsley
3	DF	Benjamin Willetts	10 February 1983 (aged 17)	(The Football Association) Aston Villa
4	DF	Ben Bowditch	19 February 1984 (aged 16)	(The Football Association) Tottenham Hotspur
5	DF	Ben Clark	24 January 1983 (aged 17)	(The Football Association) Sunderland
6	DF	Sean O'Hanlon	2 January 1983 (aged 17)	(The Football Association) Everton
7	MF	Jermaine Pennant	15 January 1983 (aged 17)	(The Football Association) Arsenal
8	MF	John Spicer	13 September 1983 (aged 16)	(The Football Association) Arsenal
9	FW	Stefan Moore	28 September 1983 (aged 16)	(The Football Association) Aston Villa
10	FW	Michael Chopra	23 December 1983 (aged 16)	(The Football Association) Newcastle United
11	MF	Neil Prince	17 March 1983 (aged 17)	(The Football Association) Liverpool
12	FW	Marvin Brown	6 July 1983 (aged 16)	(The Football Association) Bristol City
13	GK	Andy Lonergan	19 October 1983 (aged 16)	(The Football Association) Preston North End
14	MF	Stephen Cooke	15 February 1983 (aged 17)	(The Football Association) Aston Villa
15	MF	Brian Howard	23 January 1983 (aged 17)	(The Football Association) Southampton
16	MF	Lionel Morgan	17 February 1983 (aged 17)	(The Football Association) Wimbledon
17	MF	Ben Muirhead	5 January 1983 (aged 17)	(The Football Association) Manchester United
18	DF	Jon Otsemobor	23 March 1983 (aged 17)	(The Football Association) Liverpool

=== Portugal ===
Head Coach: António José Baptista De Sousa Violante

No.	Pos.	Player	Date of birth (age)	Club
1	GK	Bruno Vale	8 April 1983 (aged 17)	(Portuguese Football Federation) Porto
2	DF	Nuno Batista	17 January 1983 (aged 17)	(Portuguese Football Federation) Boavista
3	DF	Pedro Ribeiro	25 January 1983 (aged 17)	(Portuguese Football Federation) Porto
4	MF	Valdir Cardoso	1 January 1984 (aged 16)	(Portuguese Football Federation) Sporting CP
5	MF	Luís Afonso	18 March 1983 (aged 17)	(Portuguese Football Federation) Porto
6	MF	André	2 July 1983 (aged 16)	(Portuguese Football Federation) Braga
7	DF	Raul Meireles	17 March 1983 (aged 17)	(Portuguese Football Federation) Boavista
8	MF	Custódio Castro	24 May 1983 (aged 16)	(Portuguese Football Federation) Vitória de Guimarães
9	FW	Rui Figueiredo	7 April 1983 (aged 17)	(Portuguese Football Federation) Gil Vicente
10	FW	Mário Carlos	21 February 1983 (aged 17)	(Portuguese Football Federation) Vitória de Setúbal
11	FW	João Paiva	8 February 1983 (aged 17)	(Portuguese Football Federation) Sporting CP
12	GK	Pedro Miguel	16 April 1983 (aged 17)	(Portuguese Football Federation) Boavista
13	FW	Hugo Viana	15 January 1983 (aged 17)	(Portuguese Football Federation) Sporting CP
14	FW	Toninho	14 June 1983 (aged 16)	(Portuguese Football Federation) Porto
15	MF	Daniel Almeida	6 May 1984 (aged 15)	(Portuguese Football Federation) Boavista
16	DF	Carlos Marques	6 February 1983 (aged 17)	(Portuguese Football Federation) Sporting CP
17	FW	Sílvio	4 February 1983 (aged 17)	(Portuguese Football Federation) Porto
18	MF	Ricardo Quaresma	25 September 1983 (aged 16)	(Portuguese Football Federation) Sporting CP

=== Republic of Ireland ===
Head Coach: Brian Kerr

No.	Pos.	Player	Date of birth (age)	Club
1	GK	Wayne Henderson	16 September 1983 (aged 16)	(The Football Association) Aston Villa
2	MF	Stephen Brennan	26 March 1983 (aged 17)	(The Football Association) Newcastle United
3	DF	Anthony Martin	20 September 1983 (aged 16)	(The Football Association) Blackburn Rovers
4	DF	Mark Rossiter	27 May 1983 (aged 16)	(The Football Association) Sunderland
5	DF	Paddy McCarthy	31 May 1983 (aged 16)	(The Football Association) Manchester City
6	MF	Graham Ward	25 February 1983 (aged 17)	(The Football Association) Wolverhampton Wanderers
7	MF	Sean Thornton	18 May 1983 (aged 16)	(The Football Association) Tranmere Rovers
8	MF	Stephen Capper	28 February 1983 (aged 17)	(The Football Association) Sunderland
9	FW	Leonard Walker	7 September 1983 (aged 16)	(The Football Association) Leeds United
10	MF	Keith Fahey	15 January 1983 (aged 17)	(The Football Association) Arsenal
11	MF	Liam Kearney	10 January 1983 (aged 17)	(The Football Association) Nottingham Forest
12	DF	Stephen Kelly	6 September 1983 (aged 16)	(The Football Association) Tottenham Hotspur
13	DF	Seán Dillon	30 July 1983 (aged 16)	(The Football Association) Aston Villa
14	MF	Daryl McMahon	10 October 1983 (aged 16)	(The Football Association) West Ham United
15	FW	Keith Graydon	10 February 1983 (aged 17)	(The Football Association) Sunderland
16	GK	Brian Murphy	7 May 1983 (aged 16)	(The Football Association) Manchester City
17	FW	David Murphy	18 January 1983 (aged 17)	(Scottish Football Association) Celtic
18	FW	George Snee	26 January 1983 (aged 17)	(The Football Association) Tottenham Hotspur

=== Russia ===
Head Coach: Sergei Stukashov

No.	Pos.	Player	Date of birth (age)	Club
1	GK	Dmitri Chigazov	29 March 1983 (aged 17)	(Russian Football Union) Smena Saint Petersburg
2	MF	Sergei Chernogayev	20 March 1983 (aged 17)	(Russian Football Union) Torpedo Moscow
3	DF	Sergei Tsvetayev	30 June 1983 (aged 16)	(Russian Football Union) Torpedo Moscow
4	DF	Kirill Orlov	18 January 1983 (aged 17)	(Russian Football Union) Torpedo-ZIL Moscow
5	DF	Aleksandr Sheshukov	15 April 1983 (aged 17)	(Russian Football Union) Dynamo Omsk
6	MF	Georgi Mikadze	3 October 1983 (aged 16)	(Russian Football Union) Zhemchuzhina-Sochi
7	MF	Pyotr Nemov	18 October 1983 (aged 16)	(Russian Football Union) Dynamo Moscow
8	MF	Maksim Grigoryev	13 October 1983 (aged 16)	(Russian Football Union) Spartak Moscow
9	FW	Vladimir Zelenovskiy	20 June 1983 (aged 16)	(Russian Football Union) Rotor Volgograd
10	FW	Sergei Kruglyakov	8 January 1983 (aged 17)	(Russian Football Union) Fakel Voronezh
11	MF	Dmitri Sychev	26 October 1983 (aged 16)	(Russian Football Union) Smena Saint Petersburg
12	GK	Vladimir Gabulov	19 October 1983 (aged 16)	(Russian Football Union) Mozdok
13	FW	Dmitri Kudryashov	13 May 1983 (aged 16)	(French Football Federation) Saint-Étienne
14	MF	Aleksey Arkhipov	24 March 1983 (aged 17)	(Russian Football Union) Smena Moscow
15	FW	Aleksandr Dobrolyubov	22 September 1983 (aged 16)	(Russian Football Union) Zenit Saint Petersburg
16	DF	Ilya Poprygushin	31 July 1983 (aged 16)	(Russian Football Union) Torpedo-ZIL Moscow
18	DF	Ildar Gazetdinov	23 May 1983 (aged 16)	(Russian Football Union) Dynamo Moscow
19	GK	Konstantin Dzyuba	25 August 1983 (aged 16)	(Russian Football Union) Kristall Smolensk

== Group B ==
=== Czech Republic ===
Head Coach: Josef Krejča

No.	Pos.	Player	Date of birth (age)	Club
1	GK	Michal Daněk	6 July 1983 (aged 16)	(Football Association of the Czech Republic) Baník Ostrava
2	DF	Ondrej Kral	17 April 1983 (aged 17)	(Football Association of the Czech Republic) Viktoria Plzeň
3	DF	Radek Koudelny	27 May 1983 (aged 16)	(Football Association of the Czech Republic) Baník Ostrava
4	FW	Václav Svěrkoš	1 November 1983 (aged 16)	(Football Association of the Czech Republic) Baník Ostrava
5	DF	Lukaš Blazek	30 August 1983 (aged 16)	(Football Association of the Czech Republic) Svit Zlín
6	DF	Tomáš Sivok	15 September 1983 (aged 16)	(Football Association of the Czech Republic) Ceské Budéjovice
7	MF	Roman Fischer	24 March 1983 (aged 17)	(Football Association of the Czech Republic) Baník Ostrava
8	MF	Pavel Mezlík	25 June 1983 (aged 16)	(Football Association of the Czech Republic) Stavoartikel Brno
9	FW	David Střihavka	4 March 1983 (aged 17)	(Football Association of the Czech Republic) Sparta Prague
10	FW	Tomáš Jun	17 January 1983 (aged 17)	(Football Association of the Czech Republic) Sparta Prague
11	MF	Filip Trojan	21 February 1983 (aged 17)	(German Football Association) Schalke 04
12	DF	Michal Braunšleger	1 February 1983 (aged 17)	(Football Association of the Czech Republic) Teplice
13	DF	Tomáš Rada	28 September 1983 (aged 16)	(Football Association of the Czech Republic) Sparta Prague
14	DF	Petr Navratil	15 February 1983 (aged 17)	(Football Association of the Czech Republic) Sigma Olomouc
15	MF	Zdenek Partyš	17 March 1983 (aged 17)	(Football Association of the Czech Republic) Stavoartikel Brno
16	GK	Zdeněk Křížek	16 January 1983 (aged 17)	(Football Association of the Czech Republic) Ceské Budéjovice
17	FW	Petr Machan	14 February 1983 (aged 17)	(Football Association of the Czech Republic) Sigma Olomouc
18	MF	Ondrej Prochazka	16 March 1983 (aged 17)	(Football Association of the Czech Republic) Ceské Budéjovice

=== Denmark ===
Head Coach: Hans Brun Larsen

No.	Pos.	Player	Date of birth (age)	Club
1	GK	Kevin Stuhr Ellegaard	23 May 1983 (aged 16)	(Danish Football Association) Farum
2	MF	Sebastian Svärd	15 January 1983 (aged 17)	(Danish Football Association) KB
3	DF	Frank Hansen	23 February 1983 (aged 17)	(Danish Football Association) Ølstykke
4	DF	Ronnie Berndtsen	23 May 1984 (aged 15)	(Danish Football Association) Køge BK
5	MF	Jacob Sørensen	12 February 1983 (aged 17)	(Danish Football Association) AaB
6	DF	Tim Akmed M. Mansour	12 May 1983 (aged 16)	(Danish Football Association) Farum
7	DF	Martin Engelhardt Jensen	11 May 1983 (aged 16)	(Danish Football Association) BK Frem København
8	FW	Martin Nielsen Hansen	11 May 1983 (aged 16)	(Danish Football Association) AGF Århus
9	FW	Jonas Kamper	3 May 1983 (aged 16)	(Danish Football Association) Nykøbing
10	MF	Hans Yoo Mathiesen	18 August 1983 (aged 16)	(Danish Football Association) Brøndby
11	MF	Claus B. Pedersen	18 February 1983 (aged 17)	(Danish Football Association) Odense BK
12	FW	Ronni Andersen	29 January 1983 (aged 17)	(Danish Football Association) Farum
13	FW	Ronnie Tygesen	1 September 1983 (aged 16)	(Danish Football Association) Brøndby
14	FW	Torben Kruse Holt	22 February 1984 (aged 16)	(Danish Football Association) AGF Århus
15	MF	Anders Alding	15 January 1983 (aged 17)	(Danish Football Association) Akademisk Boldklub
16	GK	Stig Tavlbjerg Olsen	29 September 1983 (aged 16)	(Danish Football Association) Vejle BK
17	MF	Thomas Kahlenberg	20 March 1983 (aged 17)	(Danish Football Association) Brøndby
18	DF	Rasmus Würtz	18 September 1983 (aged 16)	(Danish Football Association) Skive

=== Finland ===
Head Coach: Timo Liekoski

No.	Pos.	Player	Date of birth (age)	Club
1	GK	Markus Koljander	25 October 1983 (aged 16)	(Football Association of Finland) Haka
2	DF	Miikka Bäckman	11 February 1983 (aged 17)	(Football Association of Finland) HJK
3	DF	Heikki Aho	16 March 1983 (aged 17)	(Football Association of Finland) Tampere United
4	DF	Kalle Sorja	2 February 1983 (aged 17)	(Football Association of Finland) HJK
5	MF	Jani Lyyski	16 March 1983 (aged 17)	(Swedish Football Association) Brommapojkarna
6	MF	Ville Harittu	11 March 1983 (aged 17)	(Football Association of Finland) TPS Turku
7	MF	Kristoffer Weckström	26 May 1983 (aged 16)	(Football Association of Finland) IFK Mariehamn
8	MF	Henri Scheweleff	15 April 1983 (aged 17)	(Football Association of Finland) Vaasan Kiisto
9	FW	Daniel Sjölund	22 April 1983 (aged 17)	(The Football Association) West Ham United
10	FW	Jussi Kujala	4 April 1983 (aged 17)	(Football Association of Finland) Tampere United
11	MF	Petri Oravainen	26 January 1983 (aged 17)	(Football Association of Finland) HJK
12	GK	Markku Lappalainen	8 January 1983 (aged 17)	(Football Association of Finland) Ponnistajat
13	DF	Mika Granholm	29 June 1983 (aged 16)	(Swedish Football Association) GIF Sundsvall
14	DF	Jukka Puurunen	20 January 1983 (aged 17)	(Football Association of Finland) OLS
15	DF	Valtter Laaksonen	3 May 1984 (aged 15)	(Football Association of Finland) Inter Turku
16	MF	Tommy Wirtanen	19 January 1983 (aged 17)	(Football Association of Finland) IFK Mariehamn
17	MF	Ari Nyman	7 February 1984 (aged 16)	(Football Association of Finland) Inter Turku
18	FW	Risto Ojanen	12 January 1983 (aged 17)	(Football Association of Finland) HJK

=== Slovakia ===
Head Coach: Anton Valovič

No.	Pos.	Player	Date of birth (age)	Club
1	GK	Peter Kostoláni	6 February 1983 (aged 17)	(Slovak Football Association) Nitra
2	DF	Matej Gala	5 January 1983 (aged 17)	(Slovak Football Association) Nitra
3	DF	Peter Strecansky	31 March 1983 (aged 17)	(Slovak Football Association) Spartak Trnava
4	DF	Marek Kostoláni	6 February 1983 (aged 17)	(Slovak Football Association) Nitra
5	DF	Peter Šedivý	5 January 1983 (aged 17)	(Slovak Football Association) Inter Bratislava
6	MF	Tomáš Ivan	12 July 1983 (aged 16)	(Slovak Football Association) Inter Bratislava
7	MF	Dušan Miklas	7 February 1983 (aged 17)	(Slovak Football Association) Dukla Trenčín
8	MF	Tomáš Labun	28 January 1984 (aged 16)	(Slovak Football Association) 1. FC Košice
9	FW	Roman Jurko	25 January 1983 (aged 17)	(Slovak Football Association) 1. FC Košice
10	MF	Tomáš Sloboda	24 September 1983 (aged 16)	(Slovak Football Association) Slovan Bratislava
11	FW	Jozef Krocko	21 January 1983 (aged 17)	(Slovak Football Association) 1. FC Košice
12	MF	Miroslav Poliaček	13 July 1983 (aged 16)	(Slovak Football Association) Baník Prievidza
13	DF	Radovan Lukac	16 October 1983 (aged 16)	(Slovak Football Association) Tatran Prešov
14	FW	Marek Bakoš	15 April 1983 (aged 17)	(Slovak Football Association) Nitra
15	MF	Matuš Prochaczka	2 January 1983 (aged 17)	(Slovak Football Association) Slovan Bratislava
16	FW	Pavol Jankovic	30 December 1983 (aged 16)	(Slovak Football Association) Slovan Bratislava
17	MF	Robert Pacinda	17 August 1983 (aged 16)	(Slovak Football Association) Inter Bratislava
18	GK	Anton Janoš	18 October 1983 (aged 16)	(Slovak Football Association) Banská Bystrica

== Group C ==
=== Germany ===
Head Coach: Bernd Stöber

No.	Pos.	Player	Date of birth (age)	Club
1	GK	Daniel Haas	1 August 1983 (aged 16)	(German Football Association) Eintracht Frankfurt
2	DF	Sascha Riether	23 March 1983 (aged 17)	(German Football Association) SC Freiburg
3	DF	Martin Stoll	9 February 1983 (aged 17)	(German Football Association) Karlsruher SC
4	DF	Alexander Aischmann	15 March 1983 (aged 17)	(German Football Association) Bayern Munich
5	MF	Benjamin Wingerter	25 March 1983 (aged 17)	(German Football Association) Schalke 04
6	MF	Matthias Lehmann	28 May 1983 (aged 16)	(German Football Association) SSV Ulm
7	DF	Moritz Volz	21 January 1983 (aged 17)	(The Football Association) Arsenal
8	MF	Domenico Cozza	18 January 1983 (aged 17)	(German Football Association) Bayer Leverkusen
9	MF	Sebastian Kneißl	13 January 1983 (aged 17)	(German Football Association) Eintracht Frankfurt
10	DF	Michael Rundio	21 January 1983 (aged 17)	(German Football Association) VfB Stuttgart
11	FW	Emmanuel Krontiris	11 February 1983 (aged 17)	(German Football Association) Tennis Borussia Berlin
12	GK	Milan Jurkovic	15 June 1983 (aged 16)	(German Football Association) VfB Stuttgart
13	DF	Christian Weber	15 September 1983 (aged 16)	(German Football Association) 1. FC Saarbrücken
14	DF	Eberhard Ilg	19 September 1983 (aged 16)	(German Football Association) VfB Stuttgart
15	DF	Christian Schulz	1 April 1983 (aged 17)	(German Football Association) Werder Bremen
16	MF	Adrian Mahr	14 February 1983 (aged 17)	(German Football Association) Borussia Dortmund
17	MF	David Odonkor	21 February 1984 (aged 16)	(German Football Association) Borussia Dortmund
18	FW	Jonas Wendt	16 January 1983 (aged 17)	(German Football Association) 1. FC Köln

=== Hungary ===
Head Coach: András Sarlós

No.	Pos.	Player	Date of birth (age)	Club
1	GK	György Váradi	1 March 1983 (aged 17)	(Hungarian Football Federation) Békéscsaba
2	DF	István Rodenbücher	22 February 1984 (aged 16)	(Hungarian Football Federation) MTK Budapest
3	DF	Roland Juhász	1 July 1983 (aged 16)	(Hungarian Football Federation) MTK Budapest
4	DF	Attila Meszáros	16 March 1983 (aged 17)	(Hungarian Football Federation) Budapest Honvéd
5	DF	Tamás Horváth	4 March 1983 (aged 17)	(Hungarian Football Federation) Békéscsaba
6	DF	Gábor Horváth	10 July 1983 (aged 16)	(Hungarian Football Federation) MTK Budapest
7	MF	Imre Deme	3 August 1983 (aged 16)	(Hungarian Football Federation) Újpest
8	DF	Csaba Regedei	16 January 1983 (aged 17)	(Hungarian Football Federation) Győr
9	FW	Árpád Nógrádi	14 March 1983 (aged 17)	(Hungarian Football Federation) Ferencváros
10	FW	Péter Czvitkovics	10 February 1983 (aged 17)	(Hungarian Football Federation) MTK Budapest
11	MF	István Csopaki	3 September 1983 (aged 16)	(Hungarian Football Federation) Ferencváros
12	GK	Peter Guban	29 August 1983 (aged 16)	(Hungarian Football Federation) Újpest
13	FW	Csaba Fülöp	26 September 1983 (aged 16)	(Hungarian Football Federation) Győr
14	MF	Dániel Lettrich	21 April 1983 (aged 17)	(Hungarian Football Federation) Újpest
15	MF	Patrik Juhász	9 July 1983 (aged 16)	(Hungarian Football Federation) Békéscsaba
16	MF	György Józsi	31 January 1983 (aged 17)	(Hungarian Football Federation) Zalaegerszeg
17	DF	Áron Horváth	1 January 1983 (aged 17)	(Hungarian Football Federation) Ferencváros
18	DF	Vilmos Vanczák	20 June 1983 (aged 16)	(Hungarian Football Federation) Diósgyőr

=== Israel ===
Head Coach: Avraham Bachar

No.	Pos.	Player	Date of birth (age)	Club
1	GK	Klil Cnaani	14 October 1983 (aged 16)	(Israel Football Association) Maccabi Kiryat Gat
2	DF	Eitan Azaria	12 May 1983 (aged 16)	(Israel Football Association) Maccabi Haifa
3	DF	Islam Cana'an	21 May 1983 (aged 16)	(Israel Football Association) Maccabi Haifa
4	MF	Itzik Cohen	10 May 1983 (aged 16)	(Israel Football Association)
5	DF	Ze'ev Haimovich	7 April 1983 (aged 17)	(Israel Football Association) Beitar Nes Tubruk
6	MF	Assaf Avrahami	2 July 1983 (aged 16)	(Israel Football Association) Hapoel Haifa
7	MF	Shay Sibony	3 April 1983 (aged 17)	(Israel Football Association) Hapoel Haifa
8	MF	Shay Abutbul	16 January 1983 (aged 17)	(Israel Football Association) Hapoel Tel Aviv
9	FW	Mor Golan	23 June 1983 (aged 16)	(Israel Football Association) Bnei Yehuda Tel Aviv
10	MF	Yaniv Azran	19 May 1983 (aged 16)	(Israel Football Association) Ashdod
11	DF	Moshe Mishaelof	10 March 1983 (aged 17)	(Israel Football Association) Maccabi Tel Aviv
12	DF	Shlomi Amos	5 February 1983 (aged 17)	(Israel Football Association) Beitar Nes Tubruk
13	DF	Tamir Cohen	4 March 1983 (aged 17)	(Israel Football Association) Maccabi Tel Aviv
14	MF	Nabil Nsaraldin	8 February 1983 (aged 17)	(Israel Football Association) Hapoel Acre
15	DF	Rubel Sarsour	7 August 1983 (aged 16)	(Israel Football Association) Maccabi Petah Tikva
16	DF	Moshe Ohayon	24 May 1983 (aged 16)	(Israel Football Association) Ashdod
17	MF	Yaniv Ben-Nissan	22 August 1983 (aged 16)	(Israel Football Association) Hapoel Petah Tikva

=== Netherlands ===
Head Coach: Arno Pijpers

No.	Pos.	Player	Date of birth (age)	Club
1	GK	Sjoerd Rensen	18 April 1984 (aged 16)	(Royal Dutch Football Association) Vitesse
2	DF	John Heitinga	15 November 1983 (aged 16)	(Royal Dutch Football Association) Ajax
3	MF	Danny Mathijssen	17 March 1983 (aged 17)	(Royal Dutch Football Association) Willem II
4	MF	Civard Sprockel	10 May 1983 (aged 16)	(Royal Dutch Football Association) Feyenoord
5	MF	Theo Groeneveld	4 February 1983 (aged 17)	(Royal Dutch Football Association) Vitesse
6	MF	Chedric Seedorf	20 April 1983 (aged 17)	(Royal Spanish Football Federation) Real Madrid
7	FW	Dona Liongo N'Kunku	5 February 1983 (aged 17)	(Royal Dutch Football Association) Feyenoord
8	DF	Mels van Driel	2 February 1983 (aged 17)	(Royal Dutch Football Association) Feyenoord
9	FW	Jhon van Beukering	29 September 1983 (aged 16)	(Royal Dutch Football Association) Vitesse
10	MF	Rafael van der Vaart	11 February 1983 (aged 17)	(Royal Dutch Football Association) Ajax
11	FW	Diego Jongen	10 March 1983 (aged 17)	(Royal Dutch Football Association) Roda JC Kerkrade
12	DF	Glenn Loovens	22 October 1983 (aged 16)	(Royal Dutch Football Association) Feyenoord
13	DF	Dirk-Jan in den Eng	6 August 1983 (aged 16)	(Royal Dutch Football Association) Ajax
14	MF	Robin van Persie	6 August 1983 (aged 16)	(Royal Dutch Football Association) Feyenoord
15	DF	Matthew Altena	22 January 1983 (aged 17)	(Royal Dutch Football Association) AZ
16	GK	Erwin Friebel	27 March 1983 (aged 17)	(Royal Dutch Football Association) ADO Den Haag
17	FW	Davide Pedrini	10 September 1983 (aged 16)	(Royal Dutch Football Association) Feyenoord
18	FW	Klaas-Jan Huntelaar	12 August 1983 (aged 16)	(Royal Dutch Football Association) De Graafschap

== Group D ==
=== Poland ===
Head Coach: Antoni Szymanowski

No.	Pos.	Player	Date of birth (age)	Club
1	GK	Grzegorz Kasprzik	20 September 1983 (aged 16)	(Polish Football Association) Górnik Zabrze
2	DF	Paweł Iwanowski	12 January 1983 (aged 17)	(Polish Football Association) Amica Wronki
3	DF	Antoni Łukasiewicz	26 June 1983 (aged 16)	(Polish Football Association) Polonia Warszawa
4	DF	Przemyslaw Rygielski	3 January 1983 (aged 17)	(Polish Football Association) Wisła Kraków
5	DF	Paweł Strąk	24 March 1983 (aged 17)	(Polish Football Association) Wisła Kraków
6	DF	Kamil Kuzera	11 March 1983 (aged 17)	(Polish Football Association) Wisła Kraków
7	MF	Mateusz Kaźmierczak	12 April 1983 (aged 17)	(Polish Football Association) Wisła Kraków
8	MF	Sebastian Pluta	31 May 1983 (aged 16)	(Polish Football Association) Raków Częstochowa
9	FW	Karol Gregorek	26 January 1983 (aged 17)	(Polish Football Association) Amica Wronki
10	FW	Paweł Brożek	21 April 1983 (aged 17)	(Polish Football Association) Wisła Kraków
11	MF	Piotr Brożek	21 April 1983 (aged 17)	(Polish Football Association) Wisła Kraków
12	GK	Miroslaw Kasprzak	6 July 1983 (aged 16)	(Polish Football Association) Lechia Zielona Góra
13	DF	Dariusz Dudka	9 December 1983 (aged 16)	(Polish Football Association) Amica Wronki
14	DF	Łukasz Lach	20 May 1983 (aged 16)	(Polish Football Association) Wisła Kraków
15	MF	Piotr Kapłon	6 February 1983 (aged 17)	(Polish Football Association) Hetman Zamość
16	MF	Piotr Biechonski	12 March 1983 (aged 17)	(Polish Football Association) Ursus Warszawa
17	FW	Karol Wójcik	12 April 1983 (aged 17)	(Polish Football Association) Wisła Kraków
18	FW	Sebastian Wrzesinski	4 January 1983 (aged 17)	(Polish Football Association) Dolcan Ząbki

=== Romania ===
Head Coach: Mihai Ianovschi

No.	Pos.	Player	Date of birth (age)	Club
1	GK	Sebastian Huțan	26 October 1983 (aged 16)	(Romanian Football Federation) UTA Arad
2	DF	Ionuț Cristian Stancu	17 January 1983 (aged 17)	(Romanian Football Federation) Școala de Fotbal Gică Popescu
3	DF	Marius Adrian Demian	26 June 1983 (aged 16)	(Romanian Football Federation) UTA Arad
4	DF	Răzvan Daniel Fritea	4 April 1983 (aged 17)	(Romanian Football Federation) UTA Arad
5	MF	Serban Cristescu	11 June 1983 (aged 16)	(Romanian Football Federation) Dinamo București
6	DF	Gabriel Tamaș	9 November 1983 (aged 16)	(Romanian Football Federation) Rapid București
7	MF	Adrian Nalați	25 May 1983 (aged 16)	(Romanian Football Federation) Gloria Bistrița
8	MF	Radu Mărginean	3 January 1983 (aged 17)	(Romanian Football Federation) UTA Arad
9	FW	Cristian Ianu	16 October 1983 (aged 16)	(Romanian Football Federation) UTA Arad
10	MF	Claudiu Mircea Ionescu	20 March 1983 (aged 17)	(Romanian Football Federation) Rapid București
11	MF	Mihăiţă Gheorghe	1 April 1983 (aged 17)	(Romanian Football Federation) Steaua București
12	GK	Alexandru Marc	16 January 1983 (aged 17)	(Romanian Football Federation) Brașov
13	DF	Daniel Nicolae Ghiță	21 March 1983 (aged 17)	(Romanian Football Federation) Argeș Pitești
14	MF	Mădălin Murgan	16 May 1983 (aged 16)	(Romanian Football Federation) Extensiv Craiova
15	MF	Cosmin Năstăsie	22 June 1983 (aged 16)	(Romanian Football Federation) Argeș Pitești
16	MF	Dan Codreanu	28 April 1983 (aged 17)	(Romanian Football Federation) Universitatea Cluj
17	DF	Andrei Nicolae Berde	27 January 1983 (aged 17)	(Romanian Football Federation) Blanuri Oradea
18	FW	Robert Roszel	30 January 1983 (aged 17)	(Romanian Football Federation) Olimpia Satu Mare

=== Spain ===
Head Coach: Juan Santisteban

No.	Pos.	Player	Date of birth (age)	Club
1	GK	David Pociello Guerrero	11 August 1983 (aged 16)	(Royal Spanish Football Federation) Espanyol
2	DF	Iban Zubiaurre	22 January 1983 (aged 17)	(Royal Spanish Football Federation) Real Sociedad
3	DF	Sergio Vara Martínez	2 January 1983 (aged 17)	(Royal Spanish Football Federation) Real Sociedad
4	DF	Héctor Pilán Gil	7 March 1983 (aged 17)	(Royal Spanish Football Federation) Valencia
5	DF	Iago Bouzón	16 March 1983 (aged 17)	(Royal Spanish Football Federation) Celta Vigo
6	MF	Marcos Gallego Reguera	15 February 1983 (aged 17)	(Royal Spanish Football Federation) Sevilla
7	MF	Jorge Pina	28 February 1983 (aged 17)	(Royal Spanish Football Federation) Zaragoza
8	MF	Jesús Ramirez Brenes	3 January 1983 (aged 17)	(Royal Spanish Football Federation) Atlético Madrid
9	MF	Carmelo	9 July 1983 (aged 16)	(Royal Spanish Football Federation) Las Palmas
10	MF	José Antonio Reyes	1 September 1983 (aged 16)	(Royal Spanish Football Federation) Sevilla
11	MF	Alonso	13 February 1983 (aged 17)	(Royal Spanish Football Federation) Real Betis
12	DF	Javier Arribas Rubio	25 March 1983 (aged 17)	(Royal Spanish Football Federation) Real Madrid
13	GK	David Yáñez Lacorzana	22 February 1983 (aged 17)	(Royal Spanish Football Federation) Deportivo La Coruña
14	FW	Toché	1 January 1983 (aged 17)	(Royal Spanish Football Federation) Atlético Madrid
15	DF	Álex Goikoetxea	8 March 1983 (aged 17)	(Royal Spanish Football Federation) Athletic Bilbao
16	MF	Diego León	16 January 1984 (aged 16)	(Royal Spanish Football Federation) Real Madrid
17	FW	Adrián Quintairos Bugallo	15 March 1983 (aged 17)	(Royal Spanish Football Federation) Real Madrid
18	FW	Rubén Arroyo	22 November 1983 (aged 16)	(Royal Spanish Football Federation) Real Madrid
