= 1991 UEFA European Under-16 Championship squads =

Football tournament squads

== Group A ==
=== Austria ===
Head coach:

=== Bulgaria ===
Head coach:

=== Germany ===
Head coach:

No.	Pos.	Player	Date of birth (age)	Caps	Goals	Club
	GK	Christian Fiedler	27 March 1975 (aged 16)			(German Football Association) Hertha BSC
	GK	Karsten Kusch	19 November 1974 (aged 16)			(German Football Association) Eintracht Frankfurt
	DF	Markus Bähr	10 September 1974 (aged 16)			(German Football Association) FC Dossenheim
	DF	Stefan Odenhausen	9 August 1974 (aged 16)			(German Football Association) SF Oestrich
	DF	Jens Rasiejewski	1 January 1975 (aged 16)			(German Football Association) VfL Marburg
	DF	Markus Schenk	26 August 1974 (aged 16)			(German Football Association) FC Berlin
	DF	Lars Schiersand	14 February 1975 (aged 16)			(German Football Association) SV Concordia Belm-Powe
	MF	Markus Carl	23 November 1974 (aged 16)			(German Football Association) 1. FC Köln
	MF	Jörg Günther	3 September 1974 (aged 16)			(German Football Association) TSG Fürstenhagen
	MF	Sascha Licht	27 September 1974 (aged 16)			(German Football Association) 1. FC Nürnberg
	MF	Karl-Heinz Lutz	8 March 1975 (aged 16)			(German Football Association) Karlsruher SC
	MF	Jens Schwab	2 August 1974 (aged 16)			(German Football Association) VfB Stuttgart
	FW	Christof Babatz	3 September 1974 (aged 16)			(German Football Association) Hannover 96
	FW	Oliver Buch	5 September 1974 (aged 16)			(German Football Association) Eintracht Frankfurt
	FW	Carsten Jancker	28 August 1974 (aged 16)			(German Football Association) FC Hansa Rostock
	FW	Jens Sarna	20 September 1974 (aged 16)			(German Football Association) Bayer 04 Leverkusen

=== Sweden ===
Head coach:

== Group B ==
=== Greece ===
Head coach:

=== Poland ===
Head coach: Jan Pieszko

No.	Pos.	Player	Date of birth (age)	Caps	Goals	Club
1	GK	Bogusław Wyparło	29 November 1974 (aged 16)			(Polish Football Association) Mielec
2	DF	Łukasz Gorszkow	6 October 1974 (aged 16)			(Polish Football Association) Star Starachowice
3	DF	Grzegorz Burmer	1 August 1974 (aged 16)			(Polish Football Association) Wisła Kraków
4	DF	Przemysław Boldt	27 August 1974 (aged 16)			(Polish Football Association) Elana Toruń
5	DF	Daniel Bogusz	21 September 1974 (aged 16)			(Polish Football Association) Jagiellonia Białystok
6	DF	Przemysław Urbaniak	9 March 1975 (aged 16)			(Polish Football Association) Mieszko Gniezno
7	MF	Tomasz Szmuc	20 August 1974 (aged 16)			(Polish Football Association) Stal Mielec
8	MF	Sebastian Matuszak	20 January 1975 (aged 16)			(Polish Football Association) Zagłębie Wałbrzych
9	FW	Tomasz Frankowski	16 August 1974 (aged 16)			(Polish Football Association) Jagiellonia Białystok
10	FW	Mariusz Nosal	13 October 1974 (aged 16)			(Polish Football Association) Górnik Zabrze
11	FW	Roman Klepczarek	19 August 1974 (aged 16)			(Polish Football Association) Orzeł Łódź
12	GK	Adam Piekutowski	31 August 1974 (aged 16)			(Polish Football Association) Lublinianka Lublin
13	MF	Mariusz Piekarski	22 March 1975 (aged 16)			(Polish Football Association) Jagiellonia Białystok
14	MF	Robert Staniszewski	23 March 1975 (aged 16)			(Polish Football Association) Górnik Zabrze
15	MF	Marek Nowicki	9 November 1974 (aged 16)			(Polish Football Association) Włókniarz Pabianice
16	FW	Jakub Bilke	11 February 1975 (aged 16)			(Polish Football Association) Broń Radom

=== Portugal ===
Head coach:Rui Cacador

No.	Pos.	Player	Date of birth (age)	Caps	Goals	Club
1	GK	Paulo Morais	10 August 1974 (aged 16)			
2	MF	Rui Gama	22 February 1975 (aged 16)			
3	FW	Bambo	22 October 1974 (aged 16)			
4	DF	Pedro Henriques	16 October 1974 (aged 16)			
5	MF	Madureira	5 February 1976 (aged 15)			
6	MF	Adriano	16 November 1974 (aged 16)			
7	MF	Rui Guerreiro	31 January 1975 (aged 16)			
8	MF	Luisinho	29 October 1974 (aged 16)			
9	MF	Zeca	7 February 1975 (aged 16)			
10	DF	Morbey	13 May 1975 (aged 15)			
11	DF	Nuno Afonso	6 October 1974 (aged 16)			
12	GK	Nuno Sampaio	26 September 1974 (aged 16)			
13	MF	Beto	28 October 1974 (aged 16)			
14	MF	Reisinho	6 July 1975 (aged 15)			
15	DF	Nuno Luis	15 January 1975 (aged 16)			
16	MF	Figueiredo	11 May 1975 (aged 15)			

=== Switzerland ===
Head coach:Jorg Weibel Hans

No.	Pos.	Player	Date of birth (age)	Caps	Goals	Club
1	GK	Andreas Kronenberg	10 September 1974 (aged 16)			
2		Mark Haller				
3	MF	Stephane Savovic	6 September 1974 (aged 16)			
4		Daniel Moser				
5	DF	Stephane Henchoz	7 September 1974 (aged 16)			
6		Raphael Ramuz				
7		Alexander Scaub				
8	DF	Sandro Vifian	13 October 1974 (aged 16)			
9		Patrick Batscher				
10		Luca Salmina				
11	MF	Heiko Plaschy	12 June 1975 (aged 15)			
12	FW	Daniel Dysli	26 August 1974 (aged 16)			
14		Luzius Notter				
15		Daniel Ackermann				
16		Florian Kohler				
20		Philipp Geiser				

== Group C ==
=== Denmark ===
Head coach:Paul Erik Bech

No.	Pos.	Player	Date of birth (age)	Caps	Goals	Club
	GK	Carsten Strøh	5 December 1974 (aged 16)			
	DF	Niclas Jensen	17 August 1974 (aged 16)			
	DF	Thomas Jensen	4 August 1974 (aged 16)			
	DF	Mikkel Kofod	23 November 1974 (aged 16)			
	DF	Kim Larsen	1 September 1974 (aged 16)			
	DF	Peter Østergaard	7 February 1975 (aged 16)			
	DF	Henrik N. Tønder	28 December 1974 (aged 16)			
	MF	Morten B. Nielsen	21 October 1974 (aged 16)			
	MF	Thomas Skovbjerg	25 October 1974 (aged 16)			
	MF	Mads Spur-Mortensen	23 September 1974 (aged 16)			
	FW	Kenni Sommer	2 August 1974 (aged 16)			
	MF	Jesper Søgaard Jensen	22 February 1976 (aged 15)			
	FW	Martin Lassesen	21 August 1974 (aged 16)			
		Rene Schmidt	19 February 1975 (aged 16)			

=== Finland ===
Head coach:

=== France ===
Head coach:

=== Romania ===
Head coach:

== Group D ==
=== Iceland ===
Head coach: Kristinn Björnsson og Þórður Lárusson

Árni Gautur Arason (GK) Gunnar Egill Þórisson (GK) Alfreð Karlsson (DF) Einar Baldvin Árnason (DF) Lúðvík Jónasson (DF) Viðar Erlingsson (DF) Orri Þórðarson (DF) Gunnlaugur Jónsson (DF) Pálmi Haraldsson (MF) Sigurbjörn Hreiðarsson (MF) Hrafnkell Kristjánsson (MF) Þorvaldur Ásgeirsson (MF) Stefán Þór Þórðarsson (MF) Jóhann Steinarsson (MF) Guðmundur Benediktsson (FW) Helgi Sigurðsson (FW) Ívar Bjarklind (FW)

=== Soviet Union ===
Head coach: Boris Ignatiev

No.	Pos.	Player	Date of birth (age)	Club
	GK	Dmitriy Kramarenko	12 September 1974 (aged 16)	(Football Federation of the Soviet Union) Dynamo Baku
	GK	Valeri Chizhov	14 April 1975 (aged 16)	(Football Federation of the Soviet Union) Spartak Moscow
	GK	Pavel Bugalo	21 August 1974 (aged 16)	(Football Federation of the Soviet Union) FC Chirchiq
	DF	Dmytro Parfenov	11 September 1974 (aged 16)	(Football Federation of the Soviet Union) Chornomorets Odesa
	MF	Andrei Konovalov	13 September 1974 (aged 16)	(Football Federation of the Soviet Union) Spartak Moscow
	FW	Valery Kechinov	5 August 1974 (aged 16)	(Football Federation of the Soviet Union) Pakhtakor Tashkent
	FW	Oleg Shatskikh	15 October 1974 (aged 16)	(Football Federation of the Soviet Union) Pakhtakor Tashkent
	FW	Oleh Mochulyak	27 September 1974 (aged 16)	(Football Federation of the Soviet Union) Chornomorets Odesa

=== Spain ===
Head coach:Juan Santisteban

No.	Pos.	Player	Date of birth (age)	Club
	GK	Javier López Vallejo	25 September 1975 (aged 15)	(Royal Spanish Football Federation) CA Osasuna
	GK	Redondo	11 August 1974 (aged 16)	(Royal Spanish Football Federation) Real Madrid
	DF	Carlos Castro	17 December 1974 (aged 16)	(Royal Spanish Football Federation) Sevilla FC
	DF	Ramón	25 November 1975 (aged 15)	(Royal Spanish Football Federation) Real Valladolid
	DF	Pedro Velasco	8 October 1974 (aged 16)	(Royal Spanish Football Federation) Real Madrid
	DF	Quique Medina	14 September 1974 (aged 16)	(Royal Spanish Football Federation) Valencia CF
	MF	César Palacios	19 October 1974 (aged 16)	(Royal Spanish Football Federation) CA Osasuna
	MF	Capó	22 August 1974 (aged 16)	(Royal Spanish Football Federation) Colegio La Salle
	MF	Antonio Robaina	30 November 1974 (aged 16)	(Royal Spanish Football Federation) UD Las Palmas
	MF	Sandro	14 October 1974 (aged 16)	(Royal Spanish Football Federation) Real Madrid
	MF	Gerardo	7 December 1974 (aged 16)	(Royal Spanish Football Federation) CA Osasuna
	FW	Josemi	6 August 1974 (aged 16)	(Royal Spanish Football Federation) Rayo Vallecano
	FW	Murgui	15 November 1974 (aged 16)	(Royal Spanish Football Federation) FC Barcelona
	FW	Juan Carlos	9 October 1974 (aged 16)	(Royal Spanish Football Federation) FC Barcelona
	FW	Dani	22 December 1974 (aged 16)	(Royal Spanish Football Federation) Real Madrid
	FW	Emilio	14 November 1974 (aged 16)	(Royal Spanish Football Federation) UD Pavía

=== Yugoslavia ===
Head coach:
