= 2000 UEFA European Under-16 Championship =

2000 UEFA Under-16 Championship
אליפות אירופה בכדורגל עד גיל 16 - 2000

Tournament details
- Host country: Israel
- Dates: 1–14 May
- Teams: 16 (from 1 confederation)

Final positions
- Champions: Portugal (4th title)
- Runners-up: Czech Republic
- Third place: Netherlands
- Fourth place: Greece

Tournament statistics
- Matches played: 32
- Goals scored: 116 (3.63 per match)
- Top scorer: (Czech Republic) Tomáš Jun (6 goals)

The 2000 UEFA European Under-16 Championship was the 18th edition of UEFA's European Under-16 Football Championship. Israel hosted the championship, during 1–14 May 2000. Players born on or after 1 January 1983 were eligible to participate in this competition. 16 teams entered the competition, and Portugal defeated the Czech Republic in the final to win the competition for the fourth time.

== Group stage ==
=== Group A ===
Team	Pld	W	D	L	GF	GA	GD	Pts
Russia	3	3	0	0	8	3	+5	9
Portugal	3	2	0	1	4	3	+1	6
Republic of Ireland	3	1	0	2	2	5	−3	3
England	3	0	0	3	4	7	−3	0

1 May 2000
11:00

England	2–3	Russia
Bowditch 22'; Moore 25'	Report	O'Hanlon 3' (o.g.); Mikadze 58'; Sheshukov 65'

Ashkelon Municipal, Ashkelon
1 May 2000
11:00

Portugal	1–0	Republic of Ireland
Silvio Nunes 15'	Report

Vasermil Stadium, Be'er Sheva

3 May 2000
11:00

England	1–2	Portugal
Clark 64'	Report	João Paiva 11', 48'

Ashdod Municipal, Ashdod
3 May 2000
11:00

Russia	3–0	Republic of Ireland
Kudryashov 42', 58'; Sheshukov 47'	Report

Vasermil Stadium, Be'er Sheva

5 May 2000
11:00

Republic of Ireland	2–1	England
Fahey 5'; Thornton 11'	Report	Chopra 47'

Ashkelon Municipal, Ashkelon
5 May 2000
11:00

Russia	2–1	Portugal
Kruglyakov 40'; Grigoryev 79'	Report	Toninho 2'

Ashdod Municipal, Ashdod

=== Group B ===
Team	Pld	W	D	L	GF	GA	GD	Pts
Czech Republic	3	2	1	0	12	6	+6	7
Slovakia	3	1	2	0	6	5	+1	5
Denmark	3	1	0	2	7	7	0	3
Finland	3	0	1	2	7	14	−7	1

1 May 2000

Czech Republic	3–1	Denmark
Jun 32', 60'; Svěrkoš 78'	Report	Kamper 41'

Haberfeld Stadium, Rishon LeZion
1 May 2000

Slovakia	2–2	Finland
Sloboda 42'; Miklas 68'	Report	Kujala 20'; Weckström 78'

Bat Yam Municipal Stadium, Bat Yam

3 May 2000

Czech Republic	2–2	Slovakia
Trojan 48', 69'	Report	Jurko 49'; Strecansky 80'

Haberfeld Stadium, Rishon LeZion
3 May 2000

Denmark	5–2	Finland
Andersen 9'; Pedersen 11'; Kamper 44'; Holt 51'; Hansen 60'	Report	Sjölund 56', 63'

Lod Municipal Stadium, Lod

5 May 2000

Finland	3–7	Czech Republic
Sjölund 22', 24'; Scheweleff 42'	Report	Svěrkoš 11'; Jun 21', 33'; Rada 48', 72', 74'; Trojan 69'

Bat Yam Municipal Stadium, Bat Yam
5 May 2000

Denmark	1–2	Slovakia
Pedersen 53'	Report	Krocko 73'; Kostoláni 79'

Haberfeld Stadium, Rishon LeZion

=== Group C ===
Team	Pld	W	D	L	GF	GA	GD	Pts
Germany	3	2	1	0	7	3	+4	7
Netherlands	3	2	0	1	4	1	+3	6
Hungary	3	1	0	2	4	7	−3	3
Israel	3	0	1	2	3	7	−4	1

1 May 2000

Hungary	1–4	Germany
Rodenbücher 5'	Report	Schulz 11'; Krontiris 46', 57'; Wendt 76'

Levita Stadium, Kfar Saba
1 May 2000

Israel	0–2	Netherlands
	Report	N'Kunku 35'; Huntelaar 78'

Herzliya Municipal Stadium, Herzliya

3 May 2000

Israel	1–3	Hungary
Abutbul 37'	Report	Horváth 11', 71'; Czvitkovics 72'

Herzliya Municipal Stadium, Herzliya
3 May 2000

Netherlands	0–1	Germany
	Report	Schulz 61'

Levita Stadium, Kfar Saba

5 May 2000

Germany	2–2	Israel
Kneißl 11', 52'	Report	Abutbul 55', 76'

Herzliya Municipal Stadium, Herzliya
5 May 2000

Netherlands	2–0	Hungary
van Beukering 43', 55'	Report

Levita Stadium, Kfar Saba

=== Group D ===
Team	Pld	W	D	L	GF	GA	GD	Pts
Greece	3	2	1	0	6	4	+2	7
Spain	3	2	0	1	9	4	+5	6
Poland	3	1	1	1	8	10	−2	4
Romania	3	0	0	3	0	5	−5	0

1 May 2000

Spain	7–2	Poland
Reyes 7'; Toché 40'; Pina 44', 52'; Alonso 50', 55', 68'	Report	Piotr Brożek 47', 51'

Beit She'an Stadium, Beit Shean
Referee: Meir Levi (Israel)
1 May 2000

Romania	0–1	Greece
	Report	Papadopoulos 34'

Kiryat Eliezer Stadium. Haifa
Referee: Mark Shield (Australia)

3 May 2000

Spain	1–0	Romania
Toché 6'	Report

Nahariya Municipal Stadium, Nahariya
Referee: Igor Ischenko (Ukraine)
3 May 2000

Poland	3–3	Greece
Pitkas 26' (o.g.); Gregorek 33'; Wojcik 79'	Report	Goundoulakis 6'; Piperias 44', 59'

Kiryat Eliezer Stadium, Haifa
Referee: Mark Shield (Australia)

5 May 2000

Greece	2–1	Spain
Katsaros 19'; Sarigiannidis 22'	Report	Carmelo 40'

Beit She'an Stadium, Beit Shean
Referee: Meir Levi (Israel)
5 May 2000

Poland	3–0	Romania
Wrzesinski 5'; Paweł Brożek 53'; Gregorek 69'	Report

Ilut Stadium, Ilut
Referee: Douglas McDonald (Scotland)

== Knockout stage ==
Quarter-finals
8 May – Rishon LeZion
Russia	0
Netherlands	3
9 May – Herzliya
Czech Republic	2
Spain	0
8 May – Lod
Germany	1 (5)
Portugal (p)	1 (6)
9 May – Bat Yam
Greece (p)	2 (4)
Slovakia	2 (2)

Semi-finals
11 May – Jerusalem
Netherlands	1
Czech Republic	2
11 May – Jerusalem
Portugal	2
Greece	1

Final
14 May – Ramat Gan
Czech Republic	1
Portugal (a.e.t.)	2
Third place
14 May – Ramat Gan
Netherlands	5
Greece	0

=== Quarter-finals ===
8 May 2000

Russia	0–3	Netherlands
	Report	Huntelaar 9'; Heitinga 47'; Van der Vaart 67'

Haberfeld Stadium, Rishon LeZion
Referee: Emil Božinovski (Macedonia)

8 May 2000

Germany	1–1 (a.e.t.)	Portugal
Kneißl 37'	Report	Carlos Marques 33'
Penalties
Stoll (penalty scored); Cozza (penalty scored); Lehmann (penalty scored); Aischmann (penalty scored); Wingerter (penalty scored); Volz (penalty missed)	5–6	(penalty scored) João Paiva; (penalty scored) Quaresma; (penalty scored) Mário Carlos; (penalty scored) Luís Afonso; (penalty scored) André; (penalty scored) Carlos Marques

Lod Municipal Stadium, Lod
Referee: Mark Shield (Australia)

9 May 2000

Czech Republic	2–0	Spain
Rada 28'; Jun 80'	Report

Herzliya Municipal Stadium, Herzliya
Referee: Helmut Fleischer (Germany)

9 May 2000

Greece	2–2 (a.e.t.)	Slovakia
Simos 60'; Piperias 70'	Report	Sloboda 76', 80'
Penalties
Filippis (penalty scored)	4–2	(penalty missed) Kostoláni

Bat Yam Municipal Stadium, Bat Yam
Referee: Levan Paniashvili (Georgia)

=== Semi-finals ===
11 May 2000

Netherlands	1–2	Czech Republic

Teddy Stadium, Jerusalem
Referee: Andrejs Sipailo (Latvia)
11 May 2000

Portugal	2–1	Greece
Custódio 56'; Hugo Viana 59'	Report	Papadopoulos 52'

Teddy Stadium, Jerusalem
Referee: Helmut Fleischer (Germany)

=== Third place playoff ===
14 May 2000

Netherlands	5–0	Greece
Van Beukering 10', 20'; Kofidis 22' (o.g.); Van der Vaart 50'; Jongen 80'	Report

Ramat Gan Stadium, Ramat Gan
Referee: Meir Levi (Israel)

=== Final ===
14 May 2000
18:30

Czech Republic	1–2 (a.e.t./g.g.)	Portugal
Jun 11'	Report	Quaresma 65' (pen.), 91'

Ramat Gan Stadium, Ramat Gan
Attendance: 950
Referee: Igorj Ishchenko (Ukraine)
