= Weckström =

Weckström is a surname. Notable people with the surname include:

- Anu Weckström (born 1977), Finnish badminton player
- Alexander Weckström (born 1987), Finnish footballer
- Björn Weckström (born 1935), Finnish sculptor and jewelry designer
- John Weckström (born 1980), Finnish footballer
- Kristoffer Weckström (born 1983), Finnish footballer
- Kurt Weckström (1911–1983), Finnish footballer
- Nina Weckström (born 1979), Finnish badminton player
