= 2011–12 Budapest Honvéd FC season =

Budapest Honvéd FC
2011–12 season
- Chairman: George Hemingway
- Manager: Attila Supka
- NB 1: 4th
- Hungarian Cup: Third round
- Hungarian League Cup: Group stage
- Top goalscorer: League: Danilo (14); All: Danilo (15)
- Highest home attendance: 5,500 v FTC (13 August 2011)
- Lowest home attendance: 200 v Videoton (12 October 2011); 200 v Gyirmót (16 November 2011)
Home colours	Away colours

The 2011–12 season was Budapest Honvéd FC's 101st competitive season, 7th consecutive season in the OTP Bank Liga and 102nd year in existence as a football club.

== First team squad ==
Note: Flags indicate national team as defined under FIFA eligibility rules; some limited exceptions apply. Players may hold more than one non-FIFA nationality.

No.	Pos.	Nation	Player
4	DF	CIV	Jean-Baptiste Akassou
5	DF	HUN	András Debreceni
6	DF	ROU	Sorin Botis
7	MF	HUN	Richárd Vernes
8	MF	HUN	Norbert Hajdú
9	FW	HUN	Gergely Délczeg
11	MF	CRO	Boris Bjelkanović
14	FW	BIH	Emir Hadžić
15	DF	MNE	Marko Vidović
17	FW	HUN	László Erdélyi
18	FW	MNE	Bojan Božović (loan from BFC Siófok)
19	FW	BRA	Nicolas Ceolin (loan from Győri ETO FC)
20	MF	HUN	Gellért Ivancsics
21	MF	ARG	Matías Porcari

No.	Pos.	Nation	Player
22	FW	CIV	Souleymane Diaby
23	GK	ROU	András Sánta
24	MF	HUN	Adrián Horváth
25	DF	CRO	Ivan Lovrić
26	MF	HUN	Patrik Hidi
27	FW	CMR	Hervé Tchami
28	FW	HUN	Gergely Bobál
29	DF	HUN	Alexisz Novák
30	MF	HUN	Bálint Vécsei
32	MF	HUN	Richárd Czár
70	FW	HUN	Milán Faggyas
71	GK	HUN	Szabolcs Kemenes
81	MF	HUN	Norbert Németh
90	MF	NGR	Marshal Johnson

== Transfers ==
=== Summer ===
In: Note: Flags indicate national team as defined under FIFA eligibility rules; some limited exceptions apply. Players may hold more than one non-FIFA nationality.

No.	Pos.	Nation	Player
9	FW	HUN	Gergely Délczeg (from BFC Siófok)
11	MF	CRO	Boris Bjelkanović (from (Croatia) NK Pomorac)
14	FW	HUN	Sándor Torghelle (from (Germany) Fortuna Düsseldorf)
17	FW	SEN	Dieng Cheikh Abass (loan return from (France) Nîmes Olympique)
18	DF	SVK	Marek Kostoláni (from (Slovakia) FK Bodva Moldava nad Bodvou)
20	MF	HUN	Gellért Ivancsics (from Zalaegerszegi TE)
22	FW	CIV	Souleymane Diaby (from (Ukraine) FC Krymteplytsia Molodizhne)
23	GK	ROU	András Sánta (from Győri ETO FC)
27	FW	CMR	Hervé Tchami (from Szolnoki MÁV FC)
28	FW	MNE	Radislav Sekulić (from (Montenegro) FK Mladost Podgorica)
29	DF	HUN	Alexisz Novák (loan return from BFC Siófok)
70	MF	NGR	Harmony Ikande (from (Italy) A.C. Milan)
81	MF	HUN	Norbert Németh (from Vasas SC)
90	MF	NGR	Marshal Johnson (from (Belgium) R.U. Saint-Gilloise)

Out: Note: Flags indicate national team as defined under FIFA eligibility rules; some limited exceptions apply. Players may hold more than one non-FIFA nationality.

No.	Pos.	Nation	Player
3	DF	BRA	Guilherme Rodrigues Moreira (to (France) Clermont Foot)
9	FW	HUN	Bálint Bajner (to (Italy) ASD Sulmona Calcio)
11	FW	ESP	Rufino Segovia del Burgo (to (Spain) Burgos CF)
15	FW	NZL	Kris Bright (to (Malta) Balzan Youths F.C.)
17	MF	SVK	Peter Fieber (to (Slovakia) FK LAFC Lučenec)
23	FW	MAR	Karim Rouani (to (Thailand) BEC Tero Sasana F.C.)
27	DF	CMR	Sadjo Haman (to Szigetszentmiklósi TK)
28	DF	HUN	Márkó Sós (to Rákospalotai EAC)
29	DF	CRO	Tomislav Labudović (to (Indonesia) Persiba Balikpapan)
99	GK	HUN	Roland Kunsági (to Rákospalotai EAC)
––	FW	HUN	Krisztofer Vida (to (Netherlands) FC Twente)

=== Winter ===
In: Note: Flags indicate national team as defined under FIFA eligibility rules; some limited exceptions apply. Players may hold more than one non-FIFA nationality.

No.	Pos.	Nation	Player
14	FW	BIH	Emir Hadžić (from (Bosnia and Herzegovina) NK Čelik Zenica)
15	DF	MNE	Marko Vidović (from (Bulgaria) PFC Levski Sofia)
18	FW	MNE	Bojan Božović (on loan from BFC Siófok)
19	FW	BRA	Nicolas Ceolin (on loan from Győri ETO FC)
21	MF	ARG	Matías Sebastián Porcari (from (Uruguay) Centro Atlético Fénix)
57	DF	CHI	Tomás Díaz Navarrete (on loan from (Belgium) R.U. Saint-Gilloise)
70	FW	HUN	Milán Faggyas (from (Austria) SV Mattersburg II)

Out: Note: Flags indicate national team as defined under FIFA eligibility rules; some limited exceptions apply. Players may hold more than one non-FIFA nationality.

No.	Pos.	Nation	Player
14	FW	HUN	Sándor Torghelle (to Videoton FC)
15	DF	HUN	Kálmán Tisza (to Szolnoki MÁV FC)
16	FW	HUN	Roland Vólent (on loan to Soproni VSE)
17	FW	SEN	Dieng Cheikh Abass (on loan to (Vietnam) Sông Lam Nghệ An F.C.)
18	MF	SVK	Marek Kostoláni (to (Austria) ASK Mannersdorf)
19	FW	BRA	Danilo (to (Switzerland) FC Sion)
21	FW	HUN	Zoltán Hercegfalvi (to Vasas SC)
28	FW	MNE	Radislav Sekulić
30	MF	CZE	Lukáš Zelenka (to (Czech Republic) 1. SK Prostějov)
70	MF	NGR	Harmony Ikande (to (Israel) Beitar Jerusalem F.C.)

- List of Hungarian football transfer summer 2011
- List of Hungarian football transfers winter 2011–12

== Statistics ==
=== Appearances and goals ===
Last updated on 27 May 2012.

No.	Pos	Nat	Player	Total		OTP Bank Liga		Hungarian Cup		League Cup	
No.	Pos	Nat	Player	Apps	Goals	Apps	Goals	Apps	Goals	Apps	Goals
4	DF	(Ivory Coast) CIV	Jean-Baptiste Akassou	11	0	9	0	0	0	2	0
5	DF	(Hungary) HUN	András Debreceni	31	0	28	0	1	0	2	0
6	DF	(Romania) ROU	Sorin Botis	30	2	28	2	1	0	1	0
7	MF	(Hungary) HUN	Richárd Vernes	6	1	4	0	0	0	2	1
8	MF	(Hungary) HUN	Norbert Hajdú	27	2	21	2	1	0	5	0
9	FW	(Hungary) HUN	Gergely Délczeg	29	6	25	4	0	0	4	2
11	MF	(Croatia) CRO	Boris Bjelkanović	5	0	1	0	0	0	4	0
14	FW	(Bosnia and Herzegovina) BIH	Emir Hadžić	7	0	7	0	0	0	0	0
15	DF	(Montenegro) MNE	Marko Vidović	10	0	10	0	0	0	0	0
17	FW	(Hungary) HUN	László Erdélyi	1	0	1	0	0	0	0	0
18	FW	(Montenegro) MNE	Bojan Božović	5	0	5	0	0	0	0	0
19	FW	(Brazil) BRA	Nicolas Ceolin	5	0	5	0	0	0	0	0
20	MF	(Hungary) HUN	Gellért Ivancsics	30	8	24	7	1	1	5	0
21	MF	(Argentina) ARG	Matías Porcari	2	0	2	0	0	0	0	0
22	FW	(Ivory Coast) CIV	Souleymane Diaby	3	0	1	0	0	0	2	0
23	GK	(Romania) ROU	András Sánta	15	-20	9	-10	1	-2	5	-8
24	MF	(Hungary) HUN	Adrián Horváth	23	1	19	1	0	0	4	0
25	DF	(Croatia) CRO	Ivan Lovrić	34	2	29	2	1	0	4	0
26	MF	(Hungary) HUN	Patrik Hidi	28	1	25	1	1	0	2	0
27	MF	(Cameroon) CMR	Hervé Tchami	29	2	26	2	0	0	3	0
28	FW	(Hungary) HUN	Gergely Bobál	1	0	1	0	0	0	0	0
29	DF	(Hungary) HUN	Alexisz Novák	15	1	12	1	0	0	3	0
30	MF	(Hungary) HUN	Bálint Vécsei	8	0	8	0	0	0	0	0
32	MF	(Hungary) HUN	Richárd Czár	5	0	4	0	0	0	1	0
70	FW	(Hungary) HUN	Milán Faggyas	7	3	7	3	0	0	0	0
71	GK	(Hungary) HUN	Szabolcs Kemenes	22	-30	22	-30	0	0	0	0
81	MF	(Hungary) HUN	Norbert Németh	20	3	16	3	1	0	3	0
90	MF	(Nigeria) NGR	Marshal Johnson	18	0	15	0	0	0	3	0
Players currently out on loan
17	FW	(Senegal) SEN	Dieng Cheikh Abass	19	4	15	2	1	0	3	2
Youth players
1	GK	(Hungary) HUN	Iván Tóth	1	0	0	0	0	0	1	0
2	DF	(Hungary) HUN	Ákos Szala	1	0	0	0	0	0	1	0
3	DF	(Hungary) HUN	Gergő Gengeliczki	1	0	0	0	0	0	1	0
5	MF	(Hungary) HUN	Gerjén Ablonczy	1	0	0	0	0	0	1	0
13	MF	(Hungary) HUN	Valér Kapacina	2	0	0	0	0	0	2	0
14	DF	(Romania) ROU	Sebastian Remeş	1	0	0	0	0	0	1	0
18	FW	(Hungary) HUN	Krisztián Nagy	1	0	0	0	0	0	1	0
32	MF	(Hungary) HUN	Zsombor Futó	1	0	0	0	0	0	1	0
36	DF	(Hungary) HUN	Botond Baráth	3	0	0	0	0	0	3	0
77	DF	(Hungary) HUN	Gergő Nagy	1	0	0	0	0	0	1	0
––	DF	(Hungary) HUN	János Fejes	1	0	0	0	0	0	1	0
––	MF	(Hungary) HUN	Gyula Lengyel	1	0	0	0	0	0	1	0
––	DF	(Hungary) HUN	Máté Varga	2	0	0	0	0	0	2	0
Players no longer at the club
14	FW	(Hungary) HUN	Sándor Torghelle	9	5	6	3	0	0	3	2
15	DF	(Hungary) HUN	Kálmán Tisza	3	0	0	0	0	0	3	0
16	FW	(Hungary) HUN	Roland Vólent	2	0	0	0	0	0	2	0
18	MF	(Slovakia) SVK	Marek Kostoláni	4	0	2	0	1	0	1	0
19	FW	(Brazil) BRA	Danilo Cirino de Oliveira	19	15	16	14	1	0	2	1
21	FW	(Hungary) HUN	Zoltán Hercegfalvi	1	0	0	0	0	0	1	0
28	FW	(Montenegro) MNE	Radislav Sekulić	10	0	6	0	1	0	3	0
30	MF	(Czech Republic) CZE	Lukáš Zelenka	9	0	7	0	1	0	1	0
70	MF	(Nigeria) NGR	Harmony Ikande	5	0	2	0	1	0	2	0

=== Top scorers ===
Includes all competitive matches. The list is sorted by shirt number when total goals are equal.

Last updated on 27 May 2012

Position	Nation	Number	Name	OTP Bank Liga	Hungarian Cup	League Cup	Total
1	(Brazil)	19	Danilo	14	0	1	15
2	(Hungary)	20	Gellért Ivancsics	7	1	0	8
3	(Hungary)	9	Gergely Délczeg	4	0	2	6
4	(Hungary)	14	Sándor Torghelle	3	0	2	5
5	(Senegal)	17	Dieng Abass	2	0	2	4
6	(Hungary)	81	Norbert Németh	3	0	0	3
7	(Hungary)	70	Milán Faggyas	3	0	0	3
8	(Hungary)	8	Norbert Hajdú	2	0	0	2
9	(Romania)	6	Sorin Botis	2	0	0	2
10	(Croatia)	25	Ivan Lovrić	2	0	0	2
11	(Cameroon)	27	Hervé Tchami	2	0	0	2
12	(Hungary)	29	Alexisz Novák	1	0	0	1
13	(Hungary)	26	Patrik Hidi	1	0	0	1
14	(Hungary)	24	Adrián Horváth	1	0	0	1
15	(Hungary)	7	Richárd Vernes	0	0	1	1
/	/	/	Own Goals	1	0	0	1
			TOTALS	48	1	8	57

=== Disciplinary record ===
Includes all competitive matches. Players with 1 card or more included only.

Last updated on 27 May 2012

Position	Nation	Number	Name	OTP Bank Liga		Hungarian Cup		League Cup		Total (Hu Total)	
Position	Nation	Number	Name	Yellow card	Red card	Yellow card	Red card	Yellow card	Red card	Yellow card	Red card
DF	(Hungary)	3	Gergő Gengeliczki	0	0	0	0	1	0	1 (0)	0 (0)
DF	(Ivory Coast)	4	Jean-Baptiste Akassou	2	2	0	0	0	0	2 (2)	2 (2)
DF	(Hungary)	5	András Debreceni	5	0	0	0	1	0	6 (5)	0 (0)
DF	(Romania)	6	Sorin Botis	4	0	0	0	0	0	4 (4)	0 (0)
MF	(Hungary)	7	Richárd Vernes	1	0	0	0	0	0	1 (1)	0 (0)
MF	(Hungary)	8	Norbert Hajdú	4	0	0	0	0	0	4 (4)	0 (0)
FW	(Hungary)	9	Gergely Délczeg	5	0	0	0	0	0	5 (5)	0 (0)
MF	(Croatia)	11	Boris Bjelkanović	0	0	0	0	2	1	2 (0)	1 (0)
MF	(Hungary)	13	Valér Kapacina	0	0	0	0	1	0	1 (0)	0 (0)
FW	(Bosnia and Herzegovina)	14	Emir Hadžić	1	0	0	0	0	0	1 (1)	0 (0)
FW	(Hungary)	14	Sándor Torghelle	2	0	0	0	0	0	2 (2)	0 (0)
DF	(Montenegro)	15	Marko Vidović	4	0	0	0	0	0	4 (4)	0 (0)
FW	(Senegal)	17	Dieng Abass	3	0	0	0	0	0	3 (3)	0 (0)
MF	(Slovakia)	18	Marek Kostoláni	0	0	0	0	1	0	1 (0)	0 (0)
FW	(Brazil)	19	Danilo	5	0	0	0	0	0	5 (5)	0 (0)
MF	(Hungary)	20	Gellért Ivancsics	2	0	0	0	0	0	2 (2)	0 (0)
MF	(Hungary)	24	Adrián Horváth	3	1	0	0	1	0	4 (3)	1 (1)
DF	(Croatia)	25	Ivan Lovrić	9	0	1	0	2	0	12 (9)	0 (0)
MF	(Hungary)	26	Patrik Hidi	2	0	0	0	0	0	2 (2)	0 (0)
MF	(Cameroon)	27	Hervé Tchami	5	0	0	0	0	0	5 (5)	0 (0)
FW	(Hungary)	28	Gergely Bobál	1	0	0	0	0	0	1 (1)	0 (0)
DF	(Hungary)	29	Alexisz Novák	2	0	0	0	1	0	3 (2)	0 (0)
FW	(Hungary)	30	Bálint Vécsei	1	0	0	0	0	0	1 (1)	0 (0)
MF	(Czech Republic)	30	Lukáš Zelenka	1	0	0	0	0	0	1 (1)	0 (0)
FW	(Hungary)	70	Milán Faggyas	1	1	0	0	0	0	1 (1)	1 (1)
MF	(Hungary)	81	Norbert Németh	8	0	0	0	0	0	8 (8)	0 (0)
MF	(Nigeria)	90	Marshal Johnson	3	0	0	0	1	1	4 (3)	1 (0)
FW	(Hungary)		Kálmán Tisza	0	0	0	0	1	0	1 (0)	0 (0)
DF	(Hungary)		Máté Varga	0	0	0	0	1	0	1 (0)	0 (0)
MF	(Hungary)		Gerjén Ablonczy	0	0	0	0	1	0	1 (0)	0 (0)
			TOTALS	74	4	1	0	14	2	89 (74)	6 (4)

=== Overall ===
Games played	37 (30 OTP Bank Liga, 1 Hungarian Cup and 6 Hungarian League Cup)
Games won	15 (13 OTP Bank Liga, 0 Hungarian Cup and 2 Hungarian League Cup)
Games drawn	8 (7 OTP Bank Liga, 0 Hungarian Cup and 1 Hungarian League Cup)
Games lost	14 (10 OTP Bank Liga, 1 Hungarian Cup and 3 Hungarian League Cup)
Goals scored	57
Goals conceded	50
Goal difference	+7
Yellow cards	89
Red cards	6
Worst discipline	(Croatia) Ivan Lovrić (12 (yellow card) , 0 (red card) )
Best result	4–0 (H) v Vasas SC – OTP Bank Liga – 30-07-2011
Best result	4–0 (H) v Zalaegerszegi TE – OTP Bank Liga – 07-08-2011
Worst result	0–3 (A) v Gyirmót SE – Ligakupa – 31-08-2011
Worst result	1–4 (H) v Kecskeméti TE – OTP Bank Liga – 23-03-2012
Worst result	0–3 (H) v Debreceni VSC – OTP Bank Liga – 20-05-2012
Most appearances	(Croatia) Ivan Lovrić (34 appearances)
Top scorer	(Brazil) Danilo (15 goal)
Points	53/111 (47.75%)

Last updated: 27 May 2012

== OTP Bank Liga ==
=== Matches ===
16 July 2011 1	Budapest Honvéd FC	1–2	Győri ETO FC	Budapest, Pest County
16:00 CET (UTC+01)	Hajdú 12'	(Report)	Dudás 57'; Dinjar 79'	Stadium: Bozsik József Stadion; Attendance: 1,500; Referee: (Hungary) Zoltán Iványi

23 July 2011 2	Szombathelyi Haladás	2–4	Budapest Honvéd FC	Szombathely, Vas County
19:00 CET (UTC+01)	Tóth 23'; Kenesei 51' (pen.)	(Report)	Danilo 16' (pen.) 36' (pen.); Novák 64'; Lovrić 71'	Stadium: Rohonci Street Stadium; Attendance: 3,000; Referee: (Hungary) Szabolcs Szilasi

30 July 2011 3	Budapest Honvéd FC	4–0	Vasas SC	Budapest, Pest County
17:30 CET (UTC+01)	Kulcsár 14' (o.g.); Németh 45' 88'; Danilo 82' (pen.)	(Report)		Stadium: Bozsik József Stadion; Attendance: 1,500; Referee: (Hungary) Gábor Oláh

5 August 2011 4	Zalaegerszegi TE	0–4	Budapest Honvéd FC	Zalaegerszeg, Zala County
18:00 CET (UTC+01)		(Report)	Délczeg 35'; Danilo 64' (pen.); Abass 74'; Hidi 90+2'	Stadium: ZTE Arena; Attendance: 2,500; Referee: (Hungary) Sándor Andó-Szabó

13 August 2011 5	Budapest Honvéd FC	1–0	Ferencvárosi TC	Budapest, Pest County
20:00 CET (UTC+01)	Németh 73'	(Report)		Stadium: Bozsik József Stadion; Attendance: 5,500; Referee: (Hungary) Tamás Bognár

20 August 2011 6	Kecskeméti TE	3–1	Budapest Honvéd FC	Kecskemét, Bács-Kiskun County
19:00 CET (UTC+01)	Gyurcsó 37'; Litsingi 47'; Foxi 83'	(Report)	Danilo 8' (pen.)	Stadium: Széktói Stadion; Attendance: 2,500; Referee: (Hungary) Roland Veizer

27 August 2011 7	Budapest Honvéd FC	1–0	Videoton FC	Budapest, Pest County
17:30 CET (UTC+01)	Danilo 58' (pen.)	(Report)		Stadium: Bozsik József Stadion; Attendance: 1,500; Referee: (Hungary) Viktor Kassai

11 September 2011 8	Lombard-Pápa TFC	3–1	Budapest Honvéd FC	Pápa, Veszprém County
19:00 CET (UTC+01)	Ferenczi 58'; Botis 64' (o.g.); Lovrencsics 75'	(Report)	Hajdú 30'	Stadium: Stadion Várkerti; Attendance: 2,200; Referee: (Chile) Alvaro Miquel Garcia

17 September 2011 9	Budapest Honvéd FC	2–0	Újpest FC	Budapest, Pest County
17:30 CET (UTC+01)	Danilo 61' (pen.) 71'	(Report)		Stadium: Bozsik József Stadion; Attendance: 3,400; Referee: (Hungary) Zoltán Iványi

24 September 2011 10	BFC Siófok	0–0	Budapest Honvéd FC	Siófok, Somogy County
18:00 CET (UTC+01)		(Report)		Stadium: Révész Street Stadium; Attendance: 1,500; Referee: (Hungary) Sándor Andó-Szabó

1 October 2011 11	Budapest Honvéd FC	2–3	Paksi SE	Budapest, Pest County
15:00 CET (UTC+01)	Botis 62'; Torghelle 70'	(Report)	Böde 47'; Vayer 66' 76'	Stadium: Bozsik József Stadion; Attendance: 2,500; Referee: (Hungary) Ádám Farkas

15 October 2011 12	Kaposvári Rákóczi FC	2–2	Budapest Honvéd FC	Kaposvár, Somogy County
18:00 CET (UTC+01)	Perić 45' (pen.); Pavlović 55'	(Report)	Danilo 8' 35'	Stadium: Stadion Kaposvár Rákóczi; Attendance: 3,500; Referee: (Hungary) Péter Solymosi

21 October 2011 13	Budapest Honvéd FC	2–1	Diósgyőri VTK	Budapest, Pest County
18:00 CET (UTC+01)	Torghelle 22'; Abass 80'	(Report)	Gallardo 17'	Stadium: Bozsik József Stadion; Attendance: 2,000; Referee: (Hungary) Zsolt Szabó

30 October 2011 14	Debreceni VSC	1–1	Budapest Honvéd FC	Debrecen, Hajdú-Bihar County
16:00 CET (UTC+01)	Szakály 23'	(Report)	Danilo 54'	Stadium: Stadion Oláh Gábor Út; Attendance: 6,000; Referee: (Hungary) Viktor Kassai

5 November 2011 15	Budapest Honvéd FC	1–1	Pécsi Mecsek FC	Budapest, Pest County
15:00 CET (UTC+01)	Torghelle 90+3'	(Report)	Bajzát 36'	Stadium: Bozsik József Stadion; Attendance: 2,500; Referee: (Hungary) Gábor Oláh

19 November 2011 16	Győri ETO FC	1–3	Budapest Honvéd FC	Győr, Győr-Moson-Sopron County
17:30 CET (UTC+01)	Ahjupera 90+1'	(Report)	Danilo 6' 57'; Ivancsics 83'	Stadium: ETO Park; Attendance: 2,500; Referee: (Hungary) Tamás Bognár

25 November 2011 17	Budapest Honvéd FC	2–2	Szombathelyi Haladás	Budapest, Pest County
18:00 CET (UTC+01)	Danilo 1'; Tchami 36'	(Report)	Vujović 46'; Tóth 90'	Stadium: Bozsik József Stadion; Attendance: 3,000; Referee: (Hungary) Roland Veizer

2 March 2012 18	Vasas SC	1–2	Budapest Honvéd FC	Budapest, Pest County
18:00 CET (UTC+01)	Szabó 85'	(Report)	Ivancsics 28' (pen.) 37' (pen.)	Stadium: Stadion Rudolf Illovszky; Attendance: 2,000; Referee: (Hungary) János Takács

10 March 2012 19	Budapest Honvéd FC	2–0	Zalaegerszegi TE	Budapest, Pest County
15:00 CET (UTC+01)	Ivancsics 20' 25' (pen.)	(Report)		Stadium: Bozsik József Stadion; Attendance: 1,000; Referee: (Hungary) Roland Veizer

18 March 2012 20	Ferencvárosi TC	0–0	Budapest Honvéd FC	Budapest, Pest County
18:00 CET (UTC+01)		(Report)		Stadium: Stadion Albert Flórián; Attendance: 7,000; Referee: (Hungary) Zsolt Szabó

23 March 2012 21	Budapest Honvéd FC	1–4	Kecskeméti TE	Budapest, Pest County
18:00 CET (UTC+01)	Faggyas 70'	(Report)	Lencse 40' 48' 84'; Savić 63'	Stadium: Bozsik József Stadion; Attendance: 1,000; Referee: (Hungary) István Vad

1 April 2012 22	Videoton FC	1–0	Budapest Honvéd FC	Székesfehérvár, Fejér County
18:00 CET (UTC+01)	Torghelle 90+2'	(Report)		Stadium: Sóstói Stadion; Attendance: 4,138; Referee: (Hungary) János Takács

8 April 2012 23	Budapest Honvéd FC	2–0	Lombard-Pápa TFC	Budapest, Pest County
16:00 CET (UTC+01)	Délczeg 17'; Botis 24'	(Report)		Stadium: Bozsik József Stadion; Attendance: 500; Referee: (Hungary) Ádám Radványi

15 April 2012 24	Újpest FC	2–0	Budapest Honvéd FC	Budapest, Pest County
18:00 CET (UTC+01)	Vasiljević 5'; Rajczi 79'	(Report)		Stadium: Szusza Ferenc Stadium; Attendance: 4,000; Referee: (Hungary) Viktor Kassai

20 April 2012 25	Budapest Honvéd FC	3–1	BFC Siófok	Budapest, Pest County
18:00 CET (UTC+01)	Lovrić 50'; Ivancsics 71'; Faggyas 80'	(Report)	Simon 84'	Stadium: Bozsik József Stadion; Attendance: 1,000; Referee: (Hungary) Roland Veizer

27 April 2012 26	Paksi SE	2–1	Budapest Honvéd FC	Paks, Tolna County
18:00 CET (UTC+01)	Böde 26'; Kiss 70'	(Report)	Horváth 48'	Stadium: Stadion PSE; Attendance: 1,790; Referee: (Hungary) Balázs Berke

6 May 2012 27	Budapest Honvéd FC	0–0	Kaposvári Rákóczi FC	Budapest, Pest County
16:00 CET (UTC+01)		(Report)		Stadium: Bozsik József Stadion; Attendance: 500; Referee: (Hungary) Zoltán Iványi

13 May 2012 28	Diósgyőri VTK	2–1	Budapest Honvéd FC	Miskolc, Borsod-Abaúj-Zemplén County
18:30 CET (UTC+01)	Tisza 24' 48'	(Report)	Délczeg 3'	Stadium: DVTK Stadion; Attendance: 9,000; Referee: (Hungary) Tamás Bognár

20 May 2012 29	Budapest Honvéd FC	0–3	Debreceni VSC	Budapest, Pest County
16:00 CET (UTC+01)		(Report)	Rezes 33'; Bouadla 75'; Coulibaly 80'	Stadium: Bozsik József Stadion; Attendance: 2,000; Referee: (Hungary) Ádám Németh

26 May 2012 30	Pécsi Mecsek FC	3–4	Budapest Honvéd FC	Pécs, Baranya County
15:00 CET (UTC+01)	Frőhlich 12'; Bajzát 23'; Okoronkwo 51'	(Report)	Tchami 1'; Ivancsics 49' (pen.); Délczeg 52'; Faggyas 61'	Stadium: Stadion PMFC; Attendance: 1,500; Referee: (Hungary) Zsolt Szabó

=== Classification ===
Pos	Team	Pld	W	D	L	GF	GA	GD	Pts	Qualification or relegation
2	Videoton	30	21	3	6	58	19	+39	66	Qualification for Europa League second qualifying round (Note: Since Debrecen won both the league and the 2011–12 Hungarian Cup competition, the second qualifying round berth transferred to the second-placed team of the league, and cup runners-up MTK (playing in the 2011–12 Nemzeti Bajnokság II) inherited the respective spot in the first qualifying round.)
3	Győr	30	20	3	7	56	31	+25	63	Ineligible for 2012–13 European competitions (Note: Győr have been suspended from participating in UEFA competitions for the first season they qualify between the 2011–12 and 2013–14 seasons in relation to club licensing violations. As a consequence, since they finish in any of the top three positions, the respective qualifying spots have been allocated to the team(s) immediately below.)
4	Honvéd	30	13	7	10	48	40	+8	46	Qualification for Europa League first qualifying round
5	Kecskemét	30	13	6	11	48	38	+10	45	
6	Paks	30	12	9	9	47	51	−4	45	

Source: MLSZ (in Hungarian)
Rules for classification: 1st points; 2nd overall wins; 3rd goal difference; 4th goals scored

=== Results summary ===
Overall								Home						Away					
Pld	W	D	L	GF	GA	GD	Pts	W	D	L	GF	GA	GD	W	D	L	GF	GA	GD
30	13	7	10	48	40	+8	46	8	3	4	24	17	+7	5	4	6	24	23	+1

Last updated: 27 May 2012.
Source: NB1

=== Results by round ===
Round	1	2	3	4	5	6	7	8	9	10	11	12	13	14	15	16	17	18	19	20	21	22	23	24	25	26	27	28	29	30
Ground	H	A	H	A	H	A	H	A	H	A	H	A	H	A	H	A	H	A	H	A	H	A	H	A	H	A	H	A	H	A
Result	L	W	W	W	W	L	W	L	W	D	L	D	W	D	D	W	D	W	W	D	L	L	W	L	W	L	D	L	L	W
Position	12	8	5	5	4	4	4	4	3	3	4	4	3	3	5	4	4	4	4	4	4	4	4	4	4	4	4	4	4	4

Updated to match(es) played on 27 May 2012. Source: Matches
A = Away; H = Home; W = Win; D = Draw; L = Loss

== Hungarian Cup ==
21 September 2011 3	Szigetszentmiklósi TK	2–1	Budapest Honvéd FC	Csepel, Pest County
15:30	Á. Fekete 22'; L. Fekete 112'	(Report)	Ivancsics 90'	Stadium: Béke téri Stadion; Referee: (Hungary) Ádám Radványi

== League Cup ==
=== Matches ===
31 August 2011 1	Gyirmót SE	3–0	Budapest Honvéd FC	Győr, Győr-Moson-Sopron County
18:00	Domanyik 16'; Tóth 78' 87'	(Report)		Stadium: Ménfői úti sporttelep Attendance: 200; Referee: (Hungary) József Erdős

7 September 2011 2	Budapest Honvéd FC	0–2	MTK Budapest FC	Budapest, Pest County
17:30		(Report)	Kelemen 28'; Frank 41'	Stadium: Bozsik József Stadion; Referee: (Hungary) László Lovas

5 October 2011 3	Videoton FC	2–1	Budapest Honvéd FC	Székesfehérvár, Fejér County
19:00	Nagy 70'; Nikolić 90+1'	(Report)	Torghelle 72'	Stadium: Sóstói Stadion; Attendance: 500; Referee: (Hungary) Balázs Böcskei

12 October 2011 4	Budapest Honvéd FC	1–1	Videoton FC	Budapest, Pest County
18:00	Abass 82'	(Report)	Fernández 90+2'	Stadium: Bozsik József Stadion; Attendance: 200; Referee: (Hungary) János Takács

9 November 2011 5	MTK Budapest FC	0–3	Budapest Honvéd FC	Budapest, Pest County
13:30		(Report)	Danilo 21'; Torghelle 37'; Abass 89'	Stadium: Hidegkuti Nándor Stadium; Attendance: 200; Referee: (Hungary) Katalin Kulcsár

16 November 2011 4	Budapest Honvéd FC	3–0	Gyirmót SE	Budapest, Pest County
17:00	Délczeg 11' (pen.) 41'; Vernes 80'	(Report)		Stadium: Bozsik József Stadion; Attendance: 200; Referee: (Hungary) Béla Botló

=== Classification ===
Pos	Team	Pld	W	D	L	GF	GA	GD	Pts	Qualification
1	Videoton	6	3	2	1	11	7	+4	11	Advance to knockout phase
2	MTK Budapest	6	3	2	1	6	5	+1	11	Advance to knockout phase
3	Budapest Honvéd	6	2	1	3	8	8	0	7	
4	Gyirmót	6	1	1	4	9	11	−2	4	

Rules for classification: 1) points; 2) goal difference; 3) number of goals scored.

== Pre Season (Winter) ==
21 January 2012	Budapest Honvéd FC	14–0	Kölesd SE	Budapest, Pest County
	Németh; Erdélyi; Nagy; Tchami; Debreceni; Vécsei	(Report)		Stadium: Bozsik József Stadion; Attendance: 300; Referee: (Hungary) Döme

21 January 2012	Budapest Honvéd FC	6–0	Tököl KSK	Budapest, Pest County
	Délczeg; Hidi; Miskovicz; Dinu; Vernes	(Report)		Stadium: Bozsik József Stadion; Attendance: 300; Referee: (Hungary) Döme

25 January 2012	Budapest Honvéd FC	3–2	MFK Ružomberok (Slovakia)	Budapest, Pest County
	Danilo; Natanale; Hadžić	(Report)	Hoferica; Oboya	Stadium: Bozsik József Stadion

25 January 2012	Budapest Honvéd FC	3–0	MFK Ružomberok (Slovakia)	Budapest, Pest County
	Délczeg; Botis	(Report)		Stadium: Bozsik József Stadion

28 January 2012	Budapest Honvéd FC	4–2	Győri ETO FC	Budapest, Pest County
	Ivancsics (pen.); Hadžić; Trninić	(Report)	Dudás; Simon	Stadium: Bozsik József Stadion

28 January 2012	Budapest Honvéd FC	0–1	Pécsi Mecsek FC	Budapest, Pest County
		(Report)	Zeljkovič 17'	Stadium: Bozsik József Stadion; Attendance: 200

1 February 2012	Budapest Honvéd FC	1–2	BKV Előre SC	Budapest, Pest County
	Czár	(Report)	Eszlátyi	Stadium: Bozsik József Stadion

4 February 2012	Budapest Honvéd FC	1–2	FK DAC 1904 Dunajská Streda (Slovakia)	Budapest, Pest County
	Faggyas	(Report)		Stadium: Bozsik József Stadion; Referee: (Hungary) Oláh

8 February 2012	Budapest Honvéd FC	3–2	Szombathelyi Haladás	Budapest, Pest County
	Hajdú; Délczeg; Czár	(Report)	Gyurján; Tóth	Stadium: Bozsik József Stadion; Attendance: 50; Referee: (Hungary) Gyöngyi Gaál

8 February 2012	Budapest Honvéd FC	5–1	Szombathelyi Haladás	Budapest, Pest County
	Ceolin 9'; Hadžić 10'; Apostu 25'; Ivancsics 46'; Horváth 56' (o.g.)	(Report)	Oross 90' (pen.)	Stadium: Bozsik József Stadion; Attendance: 100; Referee: (Hungary) Antal

11 February 2012	(Slovakia) FC ViOn Zlaté Moravce	3–1	Budapest Honvéd FC	Zlaté Moravce, Slovakia
	Hruška 70'; Pavlovič 80'; Orávik 84'	(Report)	Ceolin 35'	Stadium: Štadión FC ViOn

15 February 2012	Budapest Honvéd FC	4–1	FC Tatabánya	Budapest, Pest County
	Debreceni; Délczeg; Hadžić	(Report)	Móri	Stadium: Bozsik József Stadion; Attendance: 100; Referee: (Hungary) Gyöngyi Gaál

18 February 2012	Budapest Honvéd FC	1–1	Tiszafüredi FC	Budapest, Pest County
	Johnson	(Report)	Angyal	Stadium: Bozsik József Stadion; Attendance: 150; Referee: (Hungary) Landeszman

18 February 2012	Budapest Honvéd FC	1–1	FK AS Trenčín (Slovakia)	Budapest, Pest County
	Czár	(Report)	Depetris	Stadium: Bozsik József Stadion; Attendance: 200

25 February 2012	(Romania) FC UTA Arad	2–1	Budapest Honvéd FC	Makó, Csongrád County
		(Report)	Ivancsics 12' (pen.)	Attendance: 300
