= Ricardo André =

Ricardo André may refer to:

- Ricardo André (footballer, born 1982), Portuguese football player, full name Ricardo André Duarte Pires
- Ricardo André (footballer, born 1983), Portuguese football player, full name Ricardo André Braga da Silva
