= Sibony =

Sibony is a surname. Notable people with the surname include:

- Clément Sibony (born 1976), French actor and film director
- Nessim Sibony (1947–2021), French mathematician
- Olivier Sibony (born 1967), French author
- Shay Sibony (born 1983), Israeli footballer
