= Emir Hadžić =

Bosnian footballer (born 1984)

Personal information
- Date of birth: 19 July 1984 (age 42)
- Place of birth: Kakanj, SFR Yugoslavia
- Height: 1.83 m (6 ft 0 in)
- Position: Striker

Youth career
- –2002: Rudar Kakanj

Senior career*
Years	Team	Apps	(Gls)
2002–2003	Rudar Kakanj	14	(6)
2003–2006	Željezničar	39	(22)
2006–2007	Celje	15	(2)
2007–2009	Čelik Zenica	44	(23)
2009–2010	Panetolikos	21	(2)
2010	Istra 1961	10	(0)
2011	Čelik Zenica	25	(6)
2012	Budapest Honvéd	7	(0)
2012–2013	Sarajevo	27	(20)
2013–2014	Ironi Nir Ramat HaSharon	29	(8)
2014–2015	Hapoel Acre	23	(1)
2015–2017	Olimpik	39	(5)
Total		293	(95)

International career
2009	Bosnia and Herzegovina	1	(0)

Managerial career
- 2017–2018: Olimpik (sporting director)
- 2018–2021: Sarajevo (sports coordinator)
- 2022: Sarajevo (sports coordinator)
- * Club domestic league appearances and goals

Emir Hadžić (born 19 July 1984) is a Bosnian retired professional footballer who played as a striker.

== Club career ==
In the summer of 2009, Hadžić was transferred from Čelik Zenica, where he was captain in the Bosnian Premier League. He then decided to join Beta Ethniki club Panetolikos, where he spent the 2009–10 season. On 19 July 2010, Hadžić agreed to terminate his contract with Panetolikos and sign a two-year contract with Istra 1961. Unhappy with the playing time given at Istra, he moved back to Čelik in January 2011.

On 30 January 2012, Hadžić signed with Budapest Honvéd. He left the club in July of the same year. After Honved, Hadžić played for hometown club Sarajevo, Ironi Nir Ramat HaSharon, Hapoel Acre and Olimpik, where he finished his playing career at the age of 33.

== International career ==
Hadžić played in an unofficial game against Poland in December 2007, but he made his official debut for Bosnia and Herzegovina in a June 2009 friendly match against Uzbekistan.

== Managerial career ==
After finishing his playing career, Hadžić started working as a sporting director of Olimpik from June 2017 until May 2018. He was then the sports coordinator of Sarajevo from May 2018 to April 2021. Hadžić was reappointed as Sarajevo's sports coordinator in May 2022. He was released from his duty in November 2022.

== Career statistics ==
=== Club ===
Appearances and goals by club, season and competition
Club	Season	League			National cup (Note: Includes Bosnia and Herzegovina Cup, Slovenian Cup, Greek Cup, Croatian Cup, Israel State Cup)		League cup (Note: Includes Toto Cup)		Continental		Total	
Club	Season	Division	Apps	Goals	Apps	Goals	Apps	Goals	Apps	Goals	Apps	Goals
Željezničar Sarajevo	2002–03	Bosnian Premier League					—		1 (Note: Appearance(s) in UEFA Champions League)	0	1	0
Željezničar Sarajevo	2003–04	Bosnian Premier League		8			—		1 (Note: Appearance(s) in UEFA Cup)	0	1	8
Željezničar Sarajevo	2004–05	Bosnian Premier League	22	6			—		3	0	25	6
Željezničar Sarajevo	2005–06	Bosnian Premier League	13	2			—		—		13	2
Željezničar Sarajevo	Total		35	16			—		5	0	40	16
Celje	2006–07	Slovenian PrvaLiga	15	1			—		—		15	1
Rudar Kakanj	2006–07	First League of FBiH					—		—			
Čelik Zenica	2007–08	Bosnian Premier League	28	11			—		—		28	11
Čelik Zenica	2008–09	Bosnian Premier League	16	9			—		2 (Note: Appearance(s) in UEFA Intertoto Cup)	2	18	11
Čelik Zenica	Total		44	20			—		2	2	46	22
Panetolikos	2009–10	Beta Ethniki	21	1	2	0	—		—		23	1
Istra 1961	2010–11	Prva HNL	10	0			—		—		10	0
Čelik Zenica	2010–11	Bosnian Premier League	11	2	4	1	—		—		15	3
Čelik Zenica	2011–12	Bosnian Premier League	14	4			—		—		14	4
Čelik Zenica	Total		25	6	4	1	—		—		29	7
Budapest Honvéd	2011–12	Nemzeti Bajnokság I	7	0	—		—		—		7	0
Sarajevo	2012–13	Bosnian Premier League	27	20	3	3	—		6 (Note: Appearance(s) in UEFA Europa League)	3	36	26
Hapoel Nir Ramat HaSharon	2013–14	Israeli Premier League	29	8	2	0	—		—		31	8
Hapoel Acre	2014–15	Israeli Premier League	23	1	1	0	3	0	—		27	1
Olimpik	2015–16	Bosnian Premier League	21	4	1	0	—		—		22	4
Olimpik	2016–17	Bosnian Premier League	18	1	0	0	—		—		18	1
Olimpik	Total		39	5	1	0	—		—		40	5
Career total			275	78	13	4	3	0	13	5	304	87

== Honours ==
=== Player ===
Budapest Honvéd

- Puskás Cup: 2012

Individual

- Bosnian Premier League top scorer: 2012–13
