= Greece national under-17 football team =

National association football team

Greece Under-17
- Nickname(s): Εθνική παίδων ("National team of Kids")
- Association: Hellenic Football Federation
- Head coach: Vasilios Papadakis
First colours	Second colours

FIFA U-17 World Cup
- Appearances: 1 (first in 2026)

European Championship
- Appearances: 13 (first in 1985)
- Best result: Runners-up (1985)
Medal record
Men's football
UEFA European U17 Championship Formerly U-16 Championship
Silver medal – second place	1985 Hungary	Team
Bronze medal – third place	1991 Switzerland	Team

The Greece national under-17 football team is the Under-17 years of age team of the Greece national football team.

This team is for Greek players aged 17 or under at the start of the UEFA European Under-17 Championship (From 1982 to 1997 it was an Under-16 event).

== History ==
=== FIFA U-17 World Cup record ===
Year	Round	GP	W	D*	L	GS	GA
(China) 1985	Did not qualify						
(Canada) 1987	Did not qualify						
(Scotland) 1989	Did not qualify						
(Italy) 1991	Did not qualify						
(Japan) 1993	Did not qualify						
(Ecuador) 1995	Did not qualify						
(Egypt) 1997	Did not qualify						
(New Zealand) 1999	Did not qualify						
(Trinidad and Tobago) 2001	Did not qualify						
(Finland) 2003	Did not qualify						
(Peru) 2005	Did not qualify						
(South Korea) 2007	Did not qualify						
(Nigeria) 2009	Did not qualify						
(Mexico) 2011	Did not qualify						
(United Arab Emirates) 2013	Did not qualify						
(Chile) 2015	Did not qualify						
(India) 2017	Did not qualify						
(Brazil) 2019	Did not qualify						
(Indonesia) 2023	Did not qualify						
(Qatar) 2025	Did not qualify						
(Qatar) 2026	In progress	2	2	0	0	4	2
(Qatar) 2027	To be determined						
(Qatar) 2028	To be determined						
(Qatar) 2029	To be determined						
Total:1/21	TBD	2	2	0	0	4	2

Year	Round	Pld	W	D	L	GF	GA	Squad
UEFA European Under-16 Championship
(Italy) 1982	did not qualify							
(West Germany) 1984	did not qualify							
(Hungary) 1985	Runners-up	5	3	1	1	8	5	Squad
(Greece) 1986	Group stage	3	0	0	3	0	7	Squad
(France) 1987	Group stage	3	0	3	0	1	1	Squad
(Spain) 1988	did not qualify							
(Denmark) 1989	Group stage	3	0	2	1	4	5	Squad
(East Germany) 1990	did not qualify							
(Switzerland) 1991	Semi-final	3	2	2	1	7	2	Squad
(Cyprus) 1992	did not qualify							
(Turkey) 1993	Group stage	3	0	2	1	2	5	Squad
(Republic of Ireland) 1994	did not qualify							
(Belgium) 1995	did not qualify							
(Austria) 1996	Semi-final	5	3	1	2	7	8	Squad
(Germany) 1997	did not qualify							
(Scotland) 1998	Quarter-final	3	2	1	1	5	2	Squad
(Czech Republic) 1999	Group stage	3	1	0	2	1	4	Squad
(Israel) 2000	Semi-final	3	2	2	2	9	13	Squad
(England) 2001	did not qualify							
UEFA European Under-17 Championship
(Denmark) 2002	did not qualify							
(Portugal) 2003	did not qualify (Elite round)							
(France) 2004	did not qualify (Elite round)							
(Italy) 2005	did not qualify (Elite round)							
(Luxembourg) 2006	did not qualify							
(Belgium) 2007	did not qualify (Elite round)							
(Turkey) 2008	did not qualify (Elite round)							
(Germany) 2009	did not qualify (Elite round)							
(Liechtenstein) 2010	Group stage	3	0	1	2	1	4	Squad
(Serbia) 2011	did not qualify (Elite round)							
(Slovenia) 2012	did not qualify							
(Slovakia) 2013	did not qualify							
(Malta) 2014	did not qualify (Elite round)							
(Bulgaria) 2015	Group stage	3	1	1	1	3	3	Squad
(Azerbaijan) 2016	did not qualify (Elite round)							
(Croatia) 2017	did not qualify (Elite round)							
(England) 2018	did not qualify (Elite round)							
(Republic of Ireland) 2019	Group stage	3	0	1	2	1	6	Squad
(Estonia) ~~2020~~	Cancelled due to COVID-19 pandemic							
(Cyprus) ~~2021~~	Cancelled due to COVID-19 pandemic							
(Israel) 2022	did not qualify							
(Hungary) 2023	did not qualify							
(Cyprus) 2024	did not qualify							
(Albania) 2025	did not qualify							
(Estonia) 2026	did not qualify							
(Latvia) 2027	did not qualify							
(Lithuania) 2028	To be determined							
(Moldova) 2029	To be determined							
	13/23	66	37	10	19	113	67	

== Results and schedule ==
The following is a list of match results from the previous 12 months, as well as any future matches that have been scheduled.

=== 2026 ===
11 February 2026 Friendly tournament	Ukraine	3–1	Greece	Poreč, Croatia
16:00 EET	Huram 40'; Trokhym 51'; Shukalovych 55'	Report	Siozos 80' (pen.)	Stadium: Sports Center Zelena Laguna

13 February 2026 Friendly tournament	Greece	0–2	Croatia	Poreč, Croatia
13:15 EET		Report	Zuzic 15'; Ruso 30'	Stadium: Sports Center Zelena Laguna

16 February 2026 Friendly tournament	Israel	0–0	Greece	Poreč, Croatia
16:00 EET		Report		Stadium: Sports Center Zelena Laguna

25 March 2026 2026 UEFA European Under-17 Championship qualification	Greece	0–1	Montenegro	Bar, Montenegro
13:00		Report	Vušurović 67'	Stadium: Stadion Topolica; Referee: Ihar Shumilau (Belarus)

28 March 2026 2026 UEFA European Under-17 Championship qualification	Sweden	2–3	Greece	Ulcinj, Montenegro
13:00	Bryhn 61'; Imeri 90+3'	Report	Kalpakis 3'; Hidalgo 76' (o.g.); Siozios 90+5'	Stadium: Stadion Olympic; Referee: Ryan Lee (Scotland)

31 March 2026 2026 UEFA European Under-17 Championship qualification	Norway	0–1	Greece	Ulcinj, Montenegro
16:00		Report	Tsigas 32'	Stadium: Stadion Olympic; Referee: Eldorjan Hamiti (Albania)

23 September 2026 2027 UEFA European Under-17 Championship qualification	Bosnia and Herzegovina	2–0	Greece	Kakanj, Bosnia and Herzegovina
14:00	Leto 65'; Mehić 88'	Report		Stadium: Mladost Stadium; Referee: Dalibor Černý (Czech Republic)

26 September 2026 2027 UEFA European Under-17 Championship qualification	Greece	4–2	Gibraltar	Kakanj, Bosnia and Herzegovina
14:00	Veridiano 21'; Tentolouris 24'; Hinz 50' (pen.); Kakalis 78'	Report	Hill De Oliveira 38'; Payas 56'	Stadium: Mladost Stadium; Referee: Dalibor Černý (Czech Republic)

29 September 2026 2027 UEFA European Under-17 Championship qualification	Greece	2–3	Iceland	Kakanj, Bosnia and Herzegovina
14:00	Fotis 11'; Hinz 39'	Report	Jóhannsson 1'; Garðarsson 35'; Gíslason 78'	Stadium: Mladost Stadium; Referee: Wojciech Myc (Poland)

19 November 2026 2026 FIFA U-17 World Cup	Egypt	1–2	Greece	Al Rayyan, Qatar
18:00 EET	Souidi 71'	Report	Souvlatzis 54'; Karangelis 62'	Stadium: Aspire Zone; Referee: Ismael López Peñuelas (Mexico)

22 November 2026 2026 FIFA U-17 World Cup	Greece	2–1	Panama	Al Rayyan, Qatar
14:30 EET	Siozios 39'; Papasarafianos 90+5'	Report	E. López 84'	Stadium: Aspire Zone; Referee: Jianxin Du (China)

25 November 2026 2026 FIFA U-17 World Cup	Greece	v	Qatar	Al Rayyan, Qatar
16:30 EET		Report		Stadium: Aspire Zone

== 2026 FIFA U-17 World Cup ==
=== Group A ===
Pos	Team	Pld	W	D	L	GF	GA	GD	Pts	Qualification
1	Greece	2	2	0	0	4	2	+2	6	Knockout stage
2	Egypt	2	1	0	1	3	2	+1	3 (Note: Points obtained in the matches played between the teams in question: Egypt 3, Qatar 0)	Knockout stage
3	Qatar (H)	2	1	0	1	2	2	0	3	Possible knockout stage
4	Panama	2	0	0	2	1	4	−3	0	

Updated to match(es) played on 22 November 2026. Source: FIFA
Rules for classification: Group stage tiebreakers
(H) Hosts

== Honours ==
Greece national under-17 football team honours
Type	Competition	Titles	Winners	Runners-up	Third place	Ref.
International	UEFA European Under-17 Championship	0		1985	1991	

- record
- ^{S} Shared record

== Players ==
=== Current squad ===
As of 22 November 2026

The following 21 players were called up for the 2026 FIFA U-17 World Cup.

No.	Pos.	Player	Date of birth (age)	Caps	Goals	Club
1	GK	Christos Gitonas	28 September 2009 (age 17)	9	0	(Hellenic Football Federation) Panathinaikos
12	GK	Georgios Nikolaidis	28 February 2009 (age 17)	1	0	(Hellenic Football Federation) PAOK U19
13	GK	Vasilios Branis	26 October 2009 (age 17)	0	0	(Hellenic Football Federation) Olympiacos U19
2	DF	Georgios Siozios	11 February 2009 (age 17)	23	4	(Hellenic Football Federation) Olympiacos B
3	DF	Konstantinos Karangelis	7 June 2009 (age 17)	7	1	(German Football Association) VfB Stuttgart U19
4	DF	Vasilios Lavdas (captain)	22 January 2009 (age 17)	22	0	(Hellenic Football Federation) Panathinaikos
5	DF	Athanasios Filippiadis	16 February 2009 (age 17)	4	0	(Hellenic Football Federation) AEK U19
11	DF	Nikolaos Chaldezos	4 July 2009 (age 17)	10	2	(Hellenic Football Federation) PAOK U19
15	DF	Andreas Poulopoulos	31 January 2009 (age 17)	3	0	(German Football Association) SV Werder Bremen U19
17	DF	Stefanos Tsigas	27 February 2009 (age 17)	6	1	(Hellenic Football Federation) Panathinaikos U19
19	DF	Giannis Psyroukis	7 April 2009 (age 17)	3	0	(Hellenic Football Federation) PAOK U19
6	MF	Panagiotis Biniaris	25 July 2009 (age 17)	7	0	(Hellenic Football Federation) Panathinaikos
8	MF	Konstantinos Papadakis	27 April 2009 (age 17)	6	0	(Hellenic Football Federation) OFI U19
14	MF	Giannis Neto	28 August 2010 (age 16)	10	0	(Hellenic Football Federation) PAOK U17
20	MF	Sarafianos Papasarafianos	31 January 2009 (age 17)	11	4	(Hellenic Football Federation) Aris
7	FW	Iason Nebis	9 February 2009 (age 17)	20	7	(Hellenic Football Federation) Panathinaikos
9	FW	Konstantinos Souvlatzis	31 August 2009 (age 17)	17	7	(Hellenic Football Federation) PAOK U19
10	FW	Christos Kostoglou	27 June 2009 (age 17)	9	0	(Hellenic Football Federation) PAOK B
16	FW	Leonidas Vasiliadis	25 October 2009 (age 17)	1	0	(German Football Association) Fortuna Düsseldorf U19
18	FW	Argyris Argyriou	5 March 2009 (age 17)	3	0	(Hellenic Football Federation) AEK U19
21	FW	Alexios Bairamidis	10 November 2009 (age 17)	5	0	(Hellenic Football Federation) Panionios

== Former squads ==
- 2019 UEFA European Under-17 Championship squads – Greece
- 2015 UEFA European Under-17 Championship squads – Greece
- 2010 UEFA European Under-17 Championship squads – Greece

== See also ==
- Greece national football team
- Greece national under-23 football team
- Greece national under-21 football team
- Greece national under-20 football team
- Greece national under-19 football team
