= Milán Faggyas =

Hungarian footballer

Personal information
- Full name: Milán Faggyas
- Date of birth: 1 June 1989 (age 37)
- Place of birth: Miskolc, Hungary
- Height: 1.75 m (5 ft 9 in)
- Position: Striker

Team information
- Current team: Pápa
- Number: 7

Youth career
- 2003–2006: Diósgyőr

Senior career*
Years	Team	Apps	(Gls)
2006–2007	Diósgyőr	19	(0)
2007–2009	Debrecen	0	(0)
2009–2010	→ Diósgyőr (loan)	3	(0)
2010	Karlstetten	?	(?)
2010–2011	Diósgyőr	14	(3)
2011–2012	Mattersburg II	4	(0)
2012–2013	Honvéd	19	(3)
2013–2014	Szolnok	6	(1)
2014	Sopron	13	(2)
2014–	Pápa	8	(0)
- * Club domestic league appearances and goals as of 23 November 2014

Milán Faggyas (born 1 June 1989, in Miskolc) is a Hungarian football (forward) player who currently plays for Lombard-Pápa TFC.
