= Assaf Avrahami =

Israeli businessman and academic (born 1973)

- אסף אברהמי
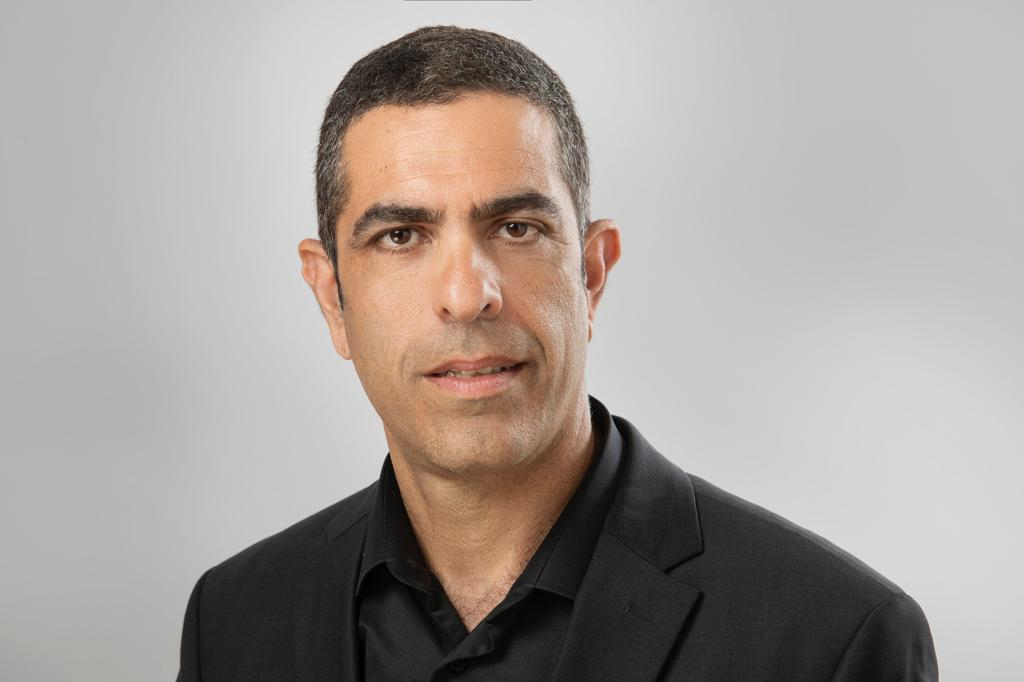
- Born: 7 August 1973 (age 53); Jerusalem, Israel
- Education: Technion
- Occupations: Businessperson, professor
- Children: 4

Assaf Avrahami (Hebrew: אסף אברהמי; born August 7, 1973) is an Israeli businessman and academic. He is the CEO of Hilan Value, chairman of the Board of Directors of the Israeli Center for Citizen Empowerment, a visiting professor at the Technion, and deputy mayor of the Misgav Regional Council.

== Biography ==
Assaf Avrahami was born in Jerusalem and grew up in Kiryat Shmona. His father was a school principal, and his mother was a homemaker. Avrahami is the oldest of three children.

In 1991, he began his undergraduate studies in mechanical engineering at the Technion as part of the Atuda academic reserve program. During the course of his studies he served as chairman of the Technion Students Association. In 1995, after completing his degree, he did his military service in the Israeli Navy as a development engineer. Avrahami went on to earn a Ph.D. in Industrial Engineering and Management from the Technion in 2012. He did his final doctoral year at the Massachusetts Institute of Technology (MIT).

Avrahami is married to Keren, an engineer at Rafael Advanced Defense Systems. They have four children of their own as well as a foster child. Avrahami is a resident of Gilon, a community settlement in the lower Galilee. He is a marathon runner and Ironman competitor.

== Business career ==
After his discharge from the IDF in 2001, Avrahami joined the Yedioth Media Group and became CEO of the printing division. In 2008, he was appointed CEO of Yedioth Information Technologies (YIT), the technology and information systems company responsible for the digital platforms of the Yedioth Group.

He also led and managed the development of Evrit, the first digital book platform in Hebrew.

In 2014, Avrahami was promoted to CEO of Technology and Operation for the Yedioth Group. During his tenure, two additional printing houses were established in Rishon Lezion and Bar Lev industrial park.

After leaving Yedioth, he worked at PayMaxs, a subsidiary of the Omninet Group, the investment branch of the Nazarian family and Neil Kadisha, co-founder of Qualcomm. Paymaxs Ltd. Provides technology solutions for the global lottery industry.

In 2020, he was appointed CEO of Hashavshevet Software - Wizsoft, which was sold the following year to Hilan, a company that provides human capital management and information technology solutions for organizations. The company focus is enterprise resource planning (ERP) solutions to improve business efficiency.

In 2025, Avrahami was appointed CEO of Hilan Value.

== Academic and media career ==
Avrahami is a visiting professor at the Faculty of Data and Decision Sciences of the Technion. He is a guest writer and opinion columnist for the Israeli financial newspapers Globes and Calcalist.

== Public activism and community service ==
In 2023, after a decade on the board of directors, Avrahami was elected chairman of the board of the Israeli Center for Citizen Empowerment. He was chairman of the Gilon local committee for four years and a member of the Misgav Regional Council.

In 2024, he was elected deputy mayor of the Misgav Regional Council. Following the election, Avrahami set out his vision for Misgav's future: "I intend to use my experience and know-how in strategic planning to move Misgav forward. The Misgav Regional Council is a unique body, a mosaic of community settlements, kibbutzim and Bedouin villages. We work with people to create communities. For me, being elected to this position is a great privilege. I believe that together we can do much for the residents of Misgav."

== Awards and recognition ==
In 2013, Avrahami won the Daniel H. Wagner Prize for Excellence in the Practice of Advanced Analytics and Operations Research.
