= Islam Cana'an =

Israeli footballer (born 1983)

Islam Cana'an إسلام کنعان אסלאם כנעאן
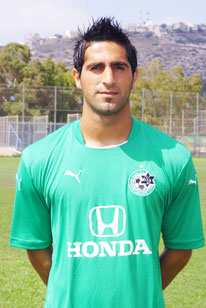

Personal information
- Full name: Islam Cana'an
- Date of birth: 21 May 1983 (age 43)
- Place of birth: Majd al-Krum, Israel
- Position: Left back

Team information
- Current team: Ihud Bnei Majd al-Krum

Youth career
- Majd al-Krum
- Maccabi Haifa

Senior career*
| Years | Team | Apps | (Gls) |
| 1999–2001 | Majd al-Krum | - | (-) |
| 2001–2008 | Maccabi Haifa | 0 | (0) |
| 2003–2005 | → Hapoel Haifa (loan) | 22 | (0) |
| 2005–2006 | → Bnei Sakhnin (loan) | - | (-) |
| 2007 | → Hapoel Nazareth Illit (loan) | 9 | (1) |
| 2007–2008 | → Bnei Sakhnin (loan) | 8 | (0) |
| 2008 | → Maccabi Herzliya (loan) | 0 | (0) |
| 2008 | Peñarol | 1 | (0) |
| 2009–2010 | Hapoel Nazareth Illit | 61 | (7) |
| 2010–2011 | F.C. Umm El Fahm | 57 | (1) |
| 2012–2014 | Maccabi Ahi Nazareth | 31 | (2) |
| 2014 | Hapoel Daliyat al-Karmel | 15 | (0) |
| 2014 | Ihud Bnei Majd al-Krum | 1 | (0) |

International career
| 1999–2000 | Israel U16 | 11 | (0) |
- * Club domestic league appearances and goals

Islam Cana'an (Arabic: إسلام کنعان; Hebrew: איסלאם כנעאן; born May 21, 1983) is an Israeli former footballer.

== Life ==
A product of the youth system at Maccabi Haifa, he was brought into the first team for the start of the 2005-06 Israeli Premier League season after being loaned out to gain playing experience. After not finding his way onto the pitch in the 2006–07 season, it was decided at Maccabi Haifa to loan him out yet again to Maccabi Herzliya. After going out on loan to Herzliya, Cana'an left Israel to join Uruguayan club, Peñarol.

== Statistics ==
| Club performance | | | League | | Cup | | League Cup | | Continental | | Total | |
| Season | Club | League | Apps | Goals | Apps | Goals | Apps | Goals | Apps | Goals | Apps | Goals |
| Israel | | | League | | Israel State Cup | | Toto Cup | | Europe | | Total | |
|---|---|---|---|---|---|---|---|---|---|---|---|---|
| 2006 | Maccabi Haifa | Israeli Premier League | 0 | 0 | 0 | 0 | 3 | 0 | 0 | 0 | 3 | 0 |
| 2006–2007 | Nazareth Illit | Liga Leumit | 9 | 1 | 0 | 0 | 0 | 0 | 0 | 0 | 9 | 1 |
| 2007–2008 | Bnei Sakhnin | Israeli Premier League | 8 | 0 | 1 | 0 | 5 | 0 | 0 | 0 | 14 | 0 |
| Total | Israel | | - | - | - | - | - | - | - | - | - | - |
| Uruguay | | | League | | Cup | | League Cup | | South America | | Total | |
| 2008 | Peñarol | Primera División | 1 | 0 | 0 | 0 | 0 | 0 | 0 | 0 | 1 | 0 |
| Total | Uruguay | | 1 | 0 | 0 | 0 | 0 | 0 | 0 | 0 | 1 | 0 |
| Israel | | | League | | Israel State Cup | | Toto Cup | | Europe | | Total | |
| 2009 | Ahva Arraba | Liga Alef | 1 | 0 | 0 | 0 | 0 | 0 | 0 | 0 | 1 | 0 |
| 2009–2010 | Nazareth Illit | Liga Leumit | 3 | 0 | 0 | 0 | 1 | 0 | 0 | 0 | 4 | 0 |
| Total | Israel | | 4 | 0 | 0 | 0 | 1 | 0 | 0 | 0 | 5 | 0 |
| Career total | | | | | | | | | | | | |
