= Mariusz Nosal =

Polish footballer (born 1974)

Personal information
- Date of birth: 13 October 1974 (age 52)
- Place of birth: Zamość, Poland
- Height: 1.86 m (6 ft 1 in)
- Position: Forward

Senior career*
Years	Team	Apps	(Gls)
–1991	Hetman Zamość		
1991–1997	Górnik Zabrze	39	(9)
1997–1999	Odra Wodzisław Śląski	74	(26)
1999–2002	Orlen Płock (Note: "Petro Płock" until 2000)		
2002–2003	Górnik Zabrze	10	(0)
2003–2005	Odra Wodzisław Śląski	24	(4)
2005	AEK Larnaca	5	(1)
2005	Odra Wodzisław Śląski	2	(0)

International career
1999	Poland	1	(0)
- * Club domestic league appearances and goals

Mariusz Nosal (born 13 October 1974) is a Polish former professional footballer who played as a forward. He made one appearance for the Poland national team in 1999.
