= Erwin Friebel =

Dutch footballer

Personal information
- Full name: Erwin Friebel
- Date of birth: 27 March 1983 (age 43)
- Place of birth: Delft, Netherlands
- Height: 1.89 m (6 ft 2 1/2 in)
- Position: Goalkeeper

Youth career
- DVV
- DHC
- ADO Den Haag
- Feyenoord

Senior career*
Years	Team	Apps	(Gls)
2002–2009	RBC	97	(0)
2009–2013	Almere City	95	(0)
2013–2014	DHC		
2014–2015	Quick Boys		
2015–2016	Scheveningen	16	(0)
- * Club domestic league appearances and goals as of 27 March 2016 (UTC)

Erwin Friebel (born 27 March 1983) is a Dutch retired footballer who played as a goalkeeper. He played professionally for RBC and Almere City.

Friebel joined Scheveningen from fellow amateur side Quick Boys in 2015, after he had moved to Katwijk from hometown club DHC a year earlier.
