= Ívar Bjarklind =

Icelandic footballer

Personal information
- Date of birth: 17 December 1974 (age 51)
- Position: Midfielder

Senior career*
Years	Team	Apps	(Gls)
1995–1999	ÍBV		
2000	KR		
2001	KA		
2002	KR		
2003–2004	KA		

International career
1997	Iceland	1	(0)
- * Club domestic league appearances and goals

Ívar Bjarklind (born 17 December 1974) is a retired Icelandic football midfielder.
