= Zeca (footballer, born 1975) =

Portuguese footballer

Personal information
- Full name: José António Gonçalves da Silva
- Date of birth: 7 February 1975 (age 51)
- Place of birth: Funchal, Portugal
- Height: 1.74 m (5 ft 9 in)
- Position: Midfielder

Youth career
- 1985–1988: Juventude Atlântico
- 1988–1993: Marítimo

Senior career*
Years	Team	Apps	(Gls)
1993–2005	Marítimo	216	(3)
2001–2005	Marítimo B	8	(0)
2005–2007	Santa Clara	25	(0)
2007–2008	União Madeira	11	(0)
Total		260	(3)

International career
1990–1991	Portugal U16	13	(0)
1992	Portugal U17	3	(1)
1992–1993	Portugal U18	6	(0)
1993	Portugal U20	3	(0)
1994	Portugal U21	1	(0)
- * Club domestic league appearances and goals

José António Gonçalves da Silva (born 7 February 1975 in Funchal, Madeira), known as Zeca, is a Portuguese former professional footballer who played as a midfielder.

He spent 13 seasons in the Primeira Liga with C.S. Marítimo, appearing in 216 matches in the competition and scoring three goals.
