= Mădălin Murgan =

Romanian footballer

Personal information
- Date of birth: 16 May 1983 (age 43)
- Place of birth: Craiova, Romania
- Height: 1.78 m (5 ft 10 in)
- Position: Midfielder

Senior career*
Years	Team	Apps	(Gls)
2000–2003	Extensiv Craiova	45	(4)
2003–2005	FC U Craiova	33	(0)
2005–2006	Argeș Pitești	22	(0)
2006	Unirea Urziceni	8	(1)
2006–2007	Ceahlăul Piatra Neamț	4	(1)
2007–2008	Dacia Mioveni	23	(0)
2008–2010	Pandurii Târgu Jiu	24	(0)
2010–2012	Olt Slatina	8	(0)
2012–2014	Voluntari		
2013–2015	CS Podari		
Total		167	(6)

Managerial career
- 2023–: Universitatea II Craiova (assistant)
- * Club domestic league appearances and goals as of 13:45, 15 June 2021 (UTC)

Mădălin Murgan (born 16 May 1983) is a Romanian former professional football player who played as a midfielder for teams such as Extensiv Craiova, FC U Craiova, Argeș Pitești, Dacia Mioveni or Pandurii Târgu Jiu, among others.
