= Alexander Weckström =

Finnish footballer (born 1987)

Personal information
- Date of birth: 27 March 1987 (age 39)
- Place of birth: Finland
- Height: 5 ft 9 in (1.75 m)
- Position: Forward

Team information
- Current team: Rynninge IK

Senior career*
| Years | Team | Apps | (Gls) |
| 2003–2007 | IFK Mariehamn | 26 | (3) |
| 2009 | IFK Örebro | 6 | (2) |
| 2010– | Rynninge IK | 32 | (11) |

International career^{‡}
| 2007– | Åland Islands | 8 | (5) |
- * Club domestic league appearances and goals as of 24 June 2013 ‡ National team caps and goals as of 24 June 2013

Alexander Weckström (born 27 March 1987) is a Ålandic footballer. He has played for Finnish football team IFK Mariehamn. He is 5'9" tall. His elder brother is Kristoffer Weckström. And he's now registered for Rynninge IK.

He also played for Åland Islands in the 2009 Island games scoring three goals, one each against Shetland, Greenland and the Isle of Man.

Appearances and goals by national team and year
| National team | Year | Apps | Goals |
|---|---|---|---|
| Åland Islands | 2009 | 5 | 3 |
| Åland Islands | 2011 | 3 | 2 |
| Total | | 8 | 5 |

Scores and results list Åland Islands' goal tally first, score column indicates score after each Weckström goal.

List of international goals scored by Alexander Weckström
| No. | Date | Venue | Opponent | Score | Result | Competition | Ref. |
|---|---|---|---|---|---|---|---|
| 1 | 28 June 2009 | Wiklöf Holding Arena, Mariehamn, Finland | Greenland | 3–0 | 4–2 | 2009 Island Games | |
| 2 | 29 June 2009 | Flen, Sweden | Shetland | 1–0 | 2–1 | 2009 Island Games | |
| 3 | 2 July 2009 | Vikingavallen, Täby kyrkby, Sweden | Isle of Man | 1–1 | 2–1 | 2009 Island Games | |
| 4 | 26 June 2011 | Beatrice Avenue, East Cowes, Isle of Wight | Saaremaa | 2–2 | 3–3 | 2011 Island Games | |
| 5 | 26 June 2011 | Beatrice Avenue, East Cowes, Isle of Wight | Saaremaa | 3–2 | 3–3 | 2011 Island Games | |
