= Danny Mathijssen =

Dutch footballer and manager

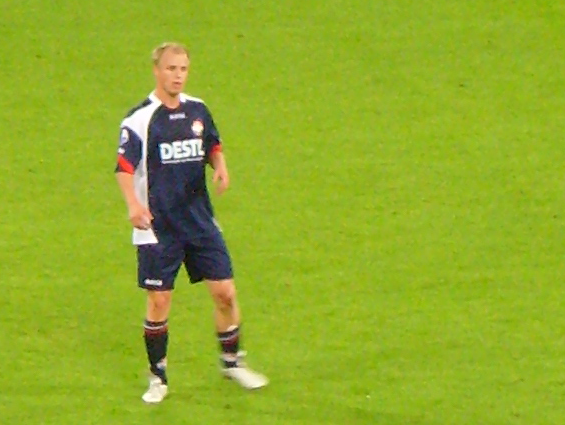

Personal information
- Date of birth: 17 March 1983 (age 43)
- Place of birth: Bergen op Zoom, Netherlands
- Position: Midfielder

Youth career
- METO
- Willem II

Senior career*
Years	Team	Apps	(Gls)
2001–2005	Willem II	94	(2)
2005–2007	AZ	1	(0)
2005–2006	→ RKC Waalwijk (loan)	14	(0)
2006–2007	→ NAC Breda (loan)	23	(0)
2007–2009	Willem II	44	(0)
Total		176	(2)

Managerial career
- 2011: METO
- 2016–2018: RBC
- 2019–: Victoria '03
- * Club domestic league appearances and goals

Danny Mathijssen (born 17 March 1983) is a Dutch football manager and former professional player. He is the head coach of Derde Klasse club Victoria '03.

== Career ==
Born in Bergen op Zoom, Mathijssen played professionally as a midfielder for Willem II, AZ, RKC Waalwijk and NAC Breda.

After retiring from playing due to injury in 2009, Mathijssen worked as a coach at RBC Roosendaal, before becoming manager of amateur team METO in 2011, a team he had previously played youth football for. He returned as head coach of RBC in 2016, leading the team from the Vierde Klasse to the Derde Klasse, before being dismissed after the 2017–18 season. In 2019, he joined Derde Klasse club Victoria '03. On 9 November 2021, he announced that he would leave the club at the end of the 2021–22 season.
