= Yaniv Ben-Nissan =

Israeli footballer

Yaniv Ben-Nissan יניב בן-ניסן
Personal information
- Date of birth: August 22, 1983 (age 43)
- Place of birth: Israel
- Height: 1.81 m (5 ft 11 in)
- Position: Left back

Youth career
- 1991–1999: Hapoel Tel Aviv
- 2000: Hapoel Petah Tikva
- 2001: Hapoel Tel Aviv
- 2001: Örgryte IS

Senior career*
Years	Team	Apps	(Gls)
2002–2003	F.C. Ashdod		
2004	Hapoel Tel Aviv	7	(0)
2005	Hapoel Jerusalem		
2006	Bnei Sakhnin		

International career
1999–2000	Israel U16	14	(0)
2001	Israel U19	3	(0)
- * Club domestic league appearances and goals

Yaniv Ben-Nissan (Hebrew: יניב בן-ניסן; born August 22, 1983) is an Israeli professional football player.

He was capped by his country at under-16 and under-19 level.
