= Przemysław Boldt =

Polish footballer

Personal information
- Date of birth: 27 August 1974 (age 52)
- Place of birth: Toruń, Poland
- Height: 1.88 m (6 ft 2 in)
- Position: Defender

Senior career*
| Years | Team | Apps | (Gls) |
| 1990–1999 | Elana Toruń | | |
| 1994–1995 | → Zawisza Bydgoszcz (loan) | | |
| 1999–2001 | Polonia Warsaw | 18 | (0) |
| 2001 | → Ruch Chorzów (loan) | 2 | (0) |
| 2001–2002 | Wisła Płock | | |
| 2003 | Widzew Łódź | 7 | (0) |
| 2004–2005 | Polar Wrocław | | |
| 2005 | Toruński KP | | |
| 2006 | Cartusia Kartuzy | | |
| 2006 | Zdrój Ciechocinek | | |
| 2007–2008 | Victoria Koronowo | | |
| 2008–2009 | Legia Chełmża | 27 | (5) |
| 2009–2010 | Unia Solec Kujawski | 15 | (1) |
| 2011–2013 | Flisak Złotoria | | |
- * Club domestic league appearances and goals

Przemysław Boldt (born 27 August 1974) is a Polish former professional footballer who played as a defender.

== Honours ==
Polonia Warsaw

- Ekstraklasa: 1999–2000
- Polish League Cup: 1999–2000
