= Kenni Sommer =

Danish footballer (born 1974)

Personal information
- Full name: Kenni Sommer Hansen
- Date of birth: 2 August 1974 (age 52)
- Position: Midfielder

Senior career*
Years	Team	Apps	(Gls)
1991–1996	Silkeborg IF		
1996–1999	Viborg FF		
1999–2000	Esbjerg fB		
- * Club domestic league appearances and goals

Kenni Sommer (born 2 August 1974) is a Danish retired football midfielder.
