= Shay Sibony =

Israeli footballer

Shay Sibony שי סיבוני
Personal information
- Full name: Shay Sibony
- Date of birth: April 3, 1983 (age 43)
- Place of birth: Haifa, Israel
- Position: Midfielder

Team information
- Current team: Maccabi Ironi Kiryat Ata
- Number: 3

Youth career
- Hapoel Haifa

Senior career*
Years	Team	Apps	(Gls)
2000–2012	Hapoel Haifa	79	(2)
2010–2011	→ Maccabi Ahi Nazareth (loan)	9	(1)
2011	→ Ironi Tiberias (loan)	5	(0)
2012	→ Maccabi Ironi Tamra (loan)	6	(0)
2012–2014	Ironi Kiryat Ata	26	(0)

International career
1999–2000	Israel U16	21	(1)
- * Club domestic league appearances and goals as of 15 May 2014

Shay Sibony (Hebrew: שי סיבוני; born 3 April 1983) was an Israeli footballer who played most of his career for Hapoel Haifa.
