= Maksim Grigoryev (footballer, born 1983) =

Russian footballer

Personal information
- Full name: Maksim Yuryevich Grigoryev
- Date of birth: 13 October 1983 (age 43)
- Place of birth: Engels, Saratov Oblast, Russian SFSR
- Height: 1.84 m (6 ft 1/2 in)
- Position: Midfielder

Senior career*
| Years | Team | Apps | (Gls) |
| 1999–2000 | FC Spartak-2 Moscow | 32 | (1) |
| 2001–2002 | FC Spartak Moscow | 0 | (0) |
| 2002 | FC Neftekhimik Nizhnekamsk | 15 | (0) |
| 2003 | FC Sokol Saratov | 2 | (0) |
| 2003 | FC Spartak Tambov | 18 | (1) |
| 2004–2006 | FC Baltika Kaliningrad | 44 | (1) |
| 2007 | FK Jūrmala | 8 | (0) |
| 2007–2008 | FC Sheksna Cherepovets | 18 | (0) |
| 2008 | FC Rusichi Oryol | 8 | (0) |
| 2009 | FC Dnepr Smolensk | 13 | (1) |
| 2009 | FC Gubkin | 12 | (1) |
| 2010–2011 | FC Spartak Tambov | 35 | (2) |
- * Club domestic league appearances and goals

Maksim Yuryevich Grigoryev (Russian: Максим Юрьевич Григорьев; born 13 October 1983) is a former Russian professional football player.

== Club career ==
He played 4 seasons in the Russian Football National League for FC Neftekhimik Nizhnekamsk, FC Sokol Saratov and FC Baltika Kaliningrad.
