= Ricardo André (footballer, born 1983) =

Portuguese footballer

Personal information
- Full name: Ricardo André Braga da Silva
- Date of birth: 2 July 1983 (age 43)
- Place of birth: Braga, Portugal
- Height: 1.76 m (5 ft 9 1/2 in)
- Position: Midfielder

Team information
- Current team: Os Sandinenses

Youth career
- 1995–2002: Braga

Senior career*
Years	Team	Apps	(Gls)
2002–2005	Braga B	57	(2)
2005	→ Joane (loan)		
2006–2007	Braga	0	(0)
2006–2007	→ Maria da Fonte (loan)	19	(0)
2007–2008	Maria da Fonte	27	(1)
2008–2017	Fafe	235	(3)
2017–2018	Juventude de Pedras Salgadas	28	(1)
2018–2019	Maria da Fonte	26	(0)
2019–	Os Sandinenses	31	(0)
Medal record
Men's football
Representing Portugal
UEFA European Under-17 Championship
Winner	2000 Israel
- * Club domestic league appearances and goals as of 3 September 2021

Ricardo André Braga da Silva, known as Ricardo André (born 2 July 1983) is a Portuguese football player who plays for Os Sandinenses.

== Club career ==
He made his professional debut in the Segunda Liga for Fafe on 6 August 2016 in a game against Braga B.

== International ==
He won the 2000 UEFA European Under-16 Championship with Portugal.
