= Mário Carlos =

Portuguese footballer

Personal information
- Full name: Mário Jorge Costa Carlos
- Date of birth: 21 February 1983 (age 43)
- Place of birth: Setúbal, Portugal
- Height: 1.70 m (5 ft 7 in)
- Position: Winger

Youth career
- 1994–2002: Vitória Setúbal

Senior career*
Years	Team	Apps	(Gls)
2002–2003	Vitória Setúbal	23	(2)
2003–2004	Nacional	13	(2)
2004–2005	União Leiria	0	(0)
2004–2005	→ Espinho (loan)	16	(2)
2005	Barreirense	14	(0)
2006	Farul Constanța	5	(0)
2006–2007	Vitória Setúbal	10	(1)
2007	Zamora	13	(1)
2007–2008	Alki Larnaca	25	(1)
2008–2009	Ermis Aradippou	20	(0)
2009–2011	Chalkanoras Idaliou	8	(1)

International career
1999	Portugal U15	6	(2)
2000	Portugal U16	9	(0)
2001	Portugal U17	3	(3)
2003	Portugal U19	10	(2)
2004	Portugal U20	3	(0)
2005	Portugal U21	3	(0)
- * Club domestic league appearances and goals

Mário Jorge Costa Carlos (born 21 February 1983), known as Mário Carlos, is a Portuguese former professional footballer who played as a winger.

A graduate of Vitória de Setúbal's youth academy, Carlos made his professional debut for the Sadinos on 22 August 2002 against Boavista. Carlos scored his first goal for Vitória de Setúbal on 4 January 2003, in a 2–1 home loss to Sporting CP.
