= Karol Gregorek =

Polish footballer

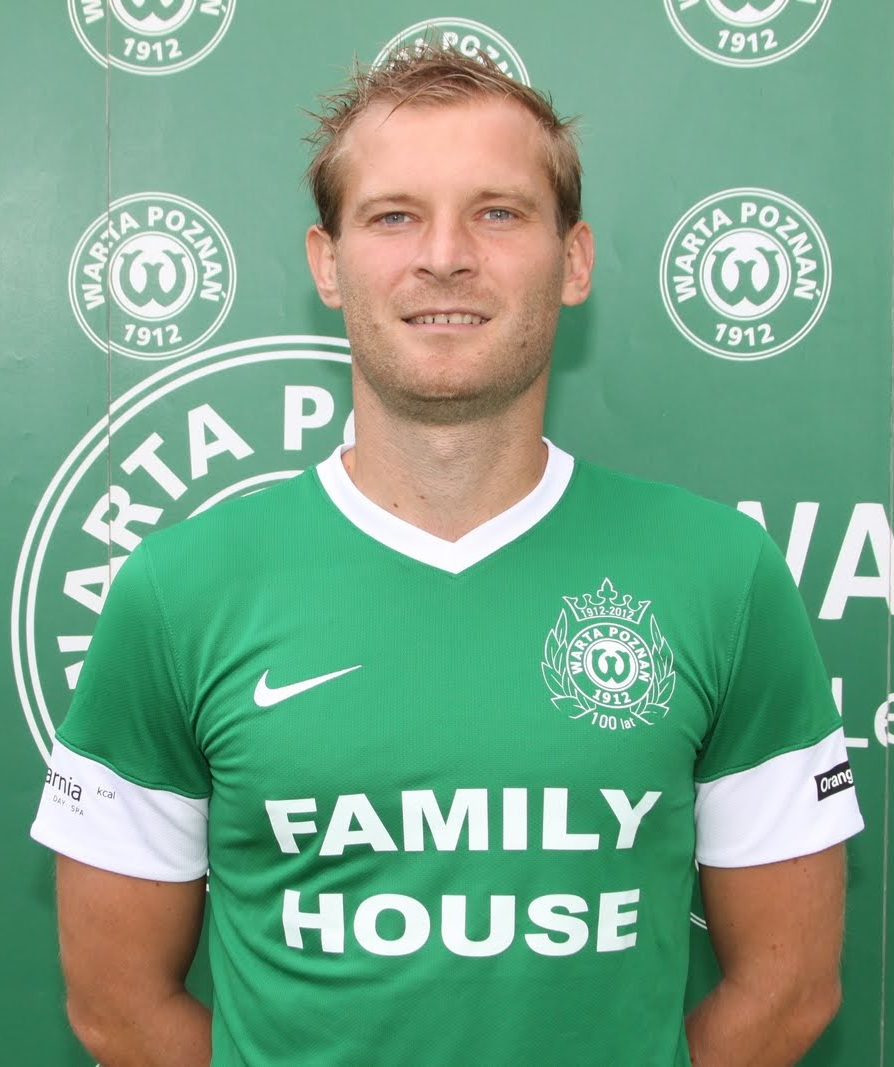
- Karol Gregorek, as a footballer of Warta Poznań in 2013.

Personal information
- Full name: Karol Gregorek
- Date of birth: 26 January 1983 (age 43)
- Place of birth: Zwoleń, Poland
- Height: 1.83 m (6 ft 0 in)
- Position: Striker

Youth career
- 1999–2000: Beniaminek Radom

Senior career*
| Years | Team | Apps | (Gls) |
| 2000–2006 | Amica Wronki | 52 | (8) |
| 2002–2003 | Amica Wronki II | | |
| 2003–2004 | → Arka Gdynia (loan) | 25 | (3) |
| 2006 | Lech Poznań | 0 | (0) |
| 2006–2009 | Wisła Płock | 51 | (7) |
| 2008 | → Cracovia (loan) | 3 | (0) |
| 2009–2011 | GKS Bełchatów | 3 | (0) |
| 2011–2012 | Chojniczanka Chojnice | 7 | (0) |
| 2012–2013 | Nielba Wągrowiec | 27 | (8) |
| 2013–2014 | Warta Poznań | 19 | (1) |
| 2014 | Tarnovia Tarnowo Podgórne | 14 | (0) |
| 2015–2017 | Warta Międzychód | | |
| 2017–2021 | Błękitni Wronki | 55 | (20) |
| 2018–2019 | → Noteć Czarnków (loan) | 27 | (15) |
| 2021–2022 | Byki Obrowo | 23 | (12) |
| 2022–2023 | Zieloni Gaj Mały | 29 | (4) |
| 2024 | Górka Wronki | 4 | (0) |

Managerial career
- 2021–2022: Sparta Szamotuły
- * Club domestic league appearances and goals as of 22:05, 23 June 2025 (UTC)

Karol Gregorek (born 26 January 1983) is a Polish professional footballer who plays as a striker.

== Career ==
He was released from GKS Bełchatów on 4 July 2011.

In August 2011, he joined Chojniczanka Chojnice.

== Honours ==
Warta Międzychód

- IV liga Greater Poland North: 2015–16

Noteć Czarnków

- Regional league Piła: 2018–19
