= Marek Kostoláni =

Slovak footballer

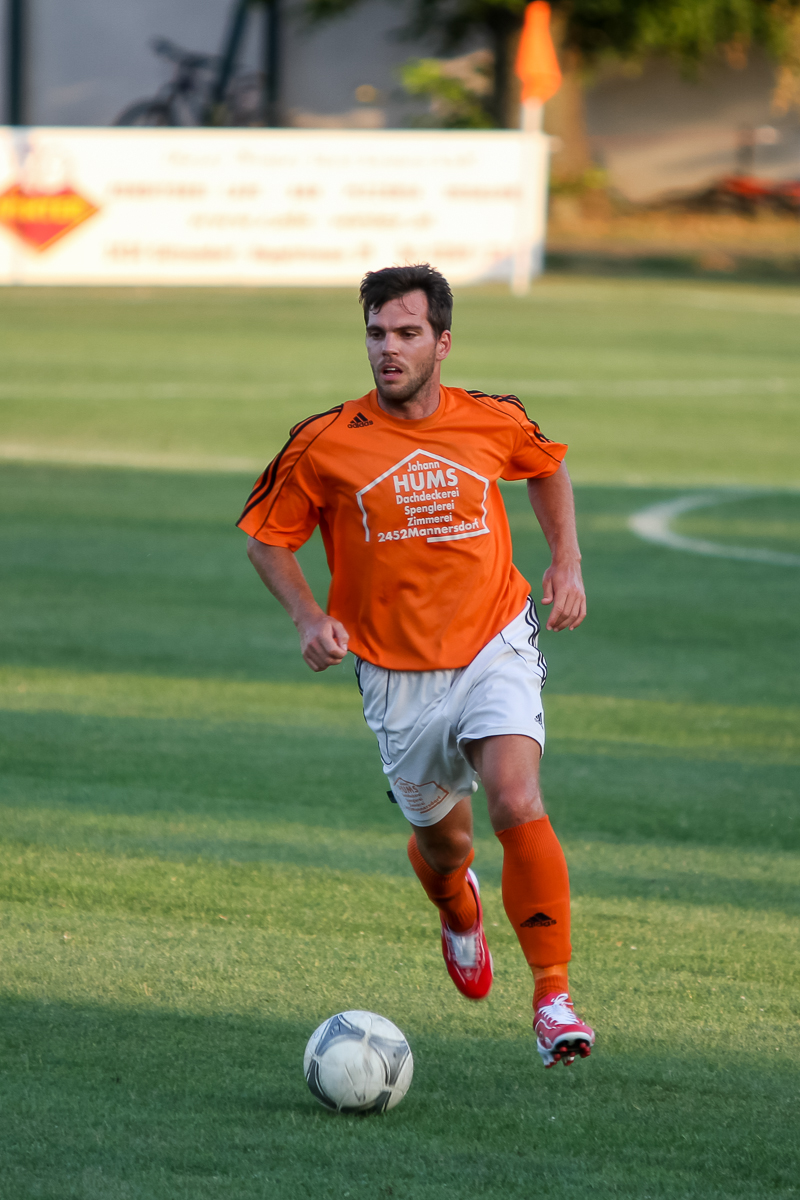

Personal information
- Date of birth: 6 February 1983 (age 43)
- Place of birth: Bojnice, Czechoslovakia
- Height: 1.79 m (5 ft 10 1/2 in)
- Positions: Defensive midfielder; defender

Team information
- Current team: FC Klasov (player-manager)

Youth career
- Nitra

Senior career*
Years	Team	Apps	(Gls)
2001–2005	Nitra		
2005–2006	Wacker Burghausen	5	(0)
2006–2007	Wacker Burghausen II	23	(2)
2007–2009	FC Nitra	3	(0)
2008	→ Nové Zámky (loan)	10	(0)
2009–2010	Karviná	13	(2)
2010–2011	Senec	3	(0)
2011	Bodva Moldava	14	(1)
2011	Budapest Honvéd	2	(0)
2011	Budapest Honvéd II	10	(0)
2012–2014	ASK Mannersdorf	66	(17)
2014–2015	FC Nitra	27	(1)
2015–2016	ASK Mannersdorf	26	(5)
2016–2018	ASV Steinbrunn	47	(9)
2018–2019	USV Halbturn	19	(1)
2019–2020	Slovan Čeľadice		
2020–	FC Klasov		

International career
2002	Slovakia U-19		
2003	Slovakia U-20	4	(0)

Managerial career
- 2020–: FC Klasov (player-manager)
- * Club domestic league appearances and goals as of 6 September 2015

Marek Kostoláni (born 6 February 1983) is a Slovak football midfielder who currently works as a player-manager for FC Klasov. He previously played for FC Nitra and Nemzeti Bajnokság I club Budapest Honvéd FC. Kostoláni is the twin brother of Peter Kostoláni, who is also a football player.

== Honours ==
=== Slovakia ===
Slovakia U20

- 2003 FIFA U-20 World Cup: Participation

Slovakia U19

- 2002 UEFA European Under-19 Football Championship - Third place
