= Kristoffer Weckström =

Finnish footballer (born 1983)

Personal information
- Date of birth: 26 May 1983 (age 43)
- Place of birth: Finland
- Height: 1.74 m (5 ft 9 in)
- Position: Midfielder

Senior career*
Years	Team	Apps	(Gls)
1999–2000	IFK Mariehamn	25	(2)
2000–2005	Derby County	0	(0)
2005–2007	IFK Mariehamn	57	(3)
2008	Sarpsborg	21	(0)
2009–2011	IFK Uppsala		

International career^{‡}
2003	Finland U21		
2011	Åland Islands	4	(0)

Managerial career
- 2013–2019: IFK Mariehamn (conditioning coach)
- 2021–2024: Finland women (conditioning coach)
- * Club domestic league appearances and goals as of 24 June 2013 ‡ National team caps and goals as of 24 June 2013

Kristoffer Weckström (born 26 May 1983) is a Finnish footballer who has played for IFK Uppsala, a Swedish amateur club. He previously played as a midfielder in Norwegian football club Sarpsborg Sparta FK. He has also played in English football club Derby County during their tenure in the Premier League.

His younger brother is Alexander Weckström.

== Career statistics ==
Appearances and goals by national team and year
National team	Year	Apps	Goals
Åland Islands	2011	4	0
Total		4	0
