= 2020–21 UEFA Europa League qualifying =

Union of European Football Associations matches

The 2020–21 UEFA Europa League qualifying phase and play-off round began on 18 August and ended on 1 October 2020.

A total of 178 teams competed in the qualifying system of the 2020–21 UEFA Europa League, which includes the qualifying phase and the play-off round, with 35 teams in Champions Path and 143 teams in Main Path. The 21 winners in the play-off round (8 from Champions Path, 13 from Main Path) advanced to the group stage, to join the 18 teams that enter in the group stage, the 6 losers of the Champions League play-off round (4 from Champions Path, 2 from League Path), and the 3 League Path losers of the Champions League third qualifying round.

Times are CEST (UTC+2), as listed by UEFA (local times, if different, are in parentheses).

== Teams ==
=== Champions Path ===
The Champions Path includes all league champions which are eliminated from the Champions Path qualifying phase of the Champions League, and consists of the following rounds:

- Second qualifying round (20 teams): 20 teams which enter in this round (3 losers of the Champions League preliminary round and 17 losers of the Champions League first qualifying round).
- Third qualifying round (18 teams): 8 teams which enter in this round (8 of the 10 losers of the Champions League second qualifying round), and 10 winners of the second qualifying round.
- Play-off round (16 teams): 7 teams which enter in this round (2 of the 10 losers of the Champions League second qualifying round and 5 losers of the Champions League third qualifying round), and 9 winners of the third qualifying round.

Below are the participating teams of the Champions Path (with their 2020 UEFA club coefficients), grouped by their starting rounds.

Key to colours
Winners of play-off round advance to group stage

Play-off round
Team	Coeff.
(Croatia) Dinamo Zagreb	33.500
(Bulgaria) Ludogorets Razgrad	26.000
(Switzerland) Young Boys	25.500
(Serbia) Red Star Belgrade	22.750
(Azerbaijan) Qarabağ	21.000
(Belarus) Dynamo Brest	3.775
(Albania) Tirana	1.475

Third qualifying round
Team	Coeff.
(Scotland) Celtic	34.000
(Poland) Legia Warsaw	17.000
(Moldova) Sheriff Tiraspol	12.750
(Romania) CFR Cluj	12.500
(Lithuania) Sūduva	6.750
(Bosnia and Herzegovina) Sarajevo	4.750
(Faroe Islands) KÍ	2.750
(Slovenia) Celje	2.600

Second qualifying round
Team	Coeff.
(Kazakhstan) Astana	29.000
(Republic of Ireland) Dundalk	8.500
(Slovakia) Slovan Bratislava	7.000
(Georgia (country)) Dinamo Tbilisi	4.750
(Luxembourg) Fola Esch	4.750
(Sweden) Djurgårdens IF	4.550
(Northern Ireland) Linfield	4.250
(Montenegro) Budućnost Podgorica	4.250
(Estonia) Flora	4.000
(Latvia) Riga	3.500
(Wales) Connah's Quay Nomads	3.250
(Gibraltar) Europa	2.750
Ararat-Armenia	2.500
(Finland) KuPS	2.500
(Iceland) KR	2.500
(San Marino) Tre Fiori	1.500
(Kosovo) Drita	1.500
(North Macedonia) Sileks	1.475
(Malta) Floriana	1.150
(Andorra) Inter Club d'Escaldes	0.566

Notes

1. ^{Q3} Losers of Champions League third qualifying round (Champions Path).
2. ^{Q2 Bye} Losers of Champions League second qualifying round (Champions Path), determined by a draw held on 31 August 2020 after the Europa League second qualifying round draw, which received a bye to the Europa League play-off round.
3. ^{Q2} Losers of Champions League second qualifying round (Champions Path).
4. ^{Q1} Losers of Champions League first qualifying round.
5. ^{PR F} Losers of Champions League preliminary round final.
6. ^{PR SF} Losers of Champions League preliminary round semi-finals.

=== Main Path ===
The Main Path includes all cup winners and league non-champions which do not qualify directly for the group stage, and consists of the following rounds:

- Preliminary round (16 teams): 16 teams which enter in this round.
- First qualifying round (94 teams): 86 teams which enter in this round, and 8 winners of the preliminary round.
- Second qualifying round (72 teams): 25 teams which enter in this round, and 47 winners of the first qualifying round.
- Third qualifying round (52 teams): 16 teams which enter in this round (including 3 League Path losers of the Champions League second qualifying round), and 36 winners of the second qualifying round.
- Play-off round (26 teams): 26 winners of the third qualifying round.

Below are the participating teams of the Main Path (with their 2020 UEFA club coefficients), grouped by their starting rounds.

Key to colours
Winners of play-off round advance to group stage

Third qualifying round
Team	Coeff.
(Turkey) Beşiktaş	54.000
(Portugal) Sporting CP	50.000
(Netherlands) PSV Eindhoven	37.000
(Czech Republic) Viktoria Plzeň	34.000
(Greece) AEK Athens	16.500
(Austria) LASK	14.000
(Russia) Rostov	12.000
(Croatia) Rijeka	11.000
(Belgium) Charleroi	7.580
(Ukraine) Desna Chernihiv	7.220
(Turkey) Alanyaspor	6.720
(Denmark) SønderjyskE	5.850
(Cyprus) Anorthosis Famagusta	5.350
(Switzerland) St. Gallen	5.280
(Serbia) Vojvodina	5.100
(Croatia) Lokomotiva Zagreb	4.975

Second qualifying round
Team	Coeff.
(England) Tottenham Hotspur	85.000
(Switzerland) Basel	58.500
(Denmark) Copenhagen	42.000
(Germany) VfL Wolfsburg	36.000
(Belarus) BATE Borisov	24.000
(Turkey) Galatasaray	23.500
(Belgium) Standard Liège	20.500
(Spain) Granada	20.456
(Italy) Milan	19.000
(Scotland) Rangers	16.250
(France) Reims	11.849
(Portugal) Rio Ave	9.889
(Russia) Dynamo Moscow	9.109
(Czech Republic) Slovan Liberec	8.000
(Croatia) Hajduk Split	7.500
(Ukraine) Kolos Kovalivka	7.220
(Netherlands) Willem II	7.150
(Czech Republic) Jablonec	7.000
(Austria) Hartberg	6.585
(Greece) Aris	5.260
(Greece) OFI	5.260
(Croatia) Osijek	4.975
(Sweden) IFK Göteborg	4.550
(Norway) Viking	4.350
(Kazakhstan) Kaisar	3.850

First qualifying round
Team	Coeff.
(Cyprus) APOEL	27.500
(Sweden) Malmö FF	22.000
(Serbia) Partizan	22.000
(Romania) FCSB	20.500
(Slovenia) Maribor	14.000
(Israel) Hapoel Be'er Sheva	14.000
(Norway) Rosenborg	13.500
(Cyprus) Apollon Limassol	12.500
(Hungary) MOL Fehérvár	10.500
(North Macedonia) Shkëndija	7.250
(Wales) The New Saints	7.000
(Belarus) Dinamo Minsk	7.000
(Poland) Lech Poznań	7.000
(Scotland) Aberdeen	6.500
(Bosnia and Herzegovina) Zrinjski Mostar	6.250
(Armenia) Alashkert	6.000
(Kazakhstan) Kairat	6.000
(Lithuania) Žalgiris	6.000
(Denmark) AGF	5.850
(Scotland) Motherwell	5.575
(Liechtenstein) Vaduz	5.500
(Albania) Kukësi	5.500
(Switzerland) Servette	5.280
(Malta) Valletta	5.250
(Latvia) Ventspils	5.250
(Slovenia) Olimpija Ljubljana	5.250
(Serbia) TSC	5.100
(Romania) Universitatea Craiova	5.000
(Estonia) Nõmme Kalju	5.000
(Belarus) Shakhtyor Soligorsk	4.750
(Sweden) Hammarby IF	4.550
(Iceland) FH	4.500
(Norway) Bodø/Glimt	4.350
(Luxembourg) Progrès Niederkorn	4.250
(Lithuania) Riteriai	4.250
(Bulgaria) CSKA Sofia	4.000
(Montenegro) Sutjeska	4.000
(Hungary) Honvéd	4.000
(Israel) Maccabi Haifa	3.925
(Israel) Beitar Jerusalem	3.925
(Kazakhstan) Ordabasy	3.850
(Azerbaijan) Neftçi	3.750
(Republic of Ireland) Shamrock Rovers	3.750
(Azerbaijan) Keşla	3.750
(Azerbaijan) Sumgayit	3.750
(Bulgaria) Lokomotiv Plovdiv	3.475
(Bulgaria) Slavia Sofia	3.475
(Romania) Botoșani	3.340
(Poland) Piast Gliwice	3.325
(Poland) Cracovia	3.325
(Estonia) FCI Levadia	3.250
(Malta) Hibernians	3.250
(Slovakia) DAC Dunajská Streda	3.175
(Slovakia) Ružomberok	3.175
(Slovakia) Žilina	3.175
(Bosnia and Herzegovina) Željezničar	3.000
(Albania) Laçi	2.750
(Slovenia) Mura	2.600
(Hungary) Puskás Akadémia	2.575
(Georgia (country)) Saburtalo Tbilisi	2.000
(North Macedonia) Shkupi	2.000
(Moldova) Petrocub Hîncești	2.000
(Luxembourg) Differdange 03	1.600
(Luxembourg) Union Titus Pétange	1.600
(Lithuania) Kauno Žalgiris	1.575
(Latvia) RFS	1.525
(Armenia) Shirak	1.525
(Latvia) Valmiera	1.525
(Armenia) Noah	1.525
(North Macedonia) Renova	1.475
(Albania) Teuta	1.475
(Bosnia and Herzegovina) Borac Banja Luka	1.375
(Moldova) Sfîntul Gheorghe	1.350
(Moldova) Dinamo-Auto	1.350
(Republic of Ireland) Derry City	1.340
(Republic of Ireland) Bohemians	1.340
(Finland) Inter Turku	1.300
(Finland) Ilves	1.300
(Finland) Honka	1.300
(Iceland) Breiðablik	1.250
(Wales) Bala Town	1.250
(Georgia (country)) Dinamo Batumi	1.150
(Malta) Sirens	1.150
(Georgia (country)) Locomotive Tbilisi	1.150
(Iceland) Víkingur Reykjavík	1.075
(Estonia) Paide Linnameeskond	0.875

Preliminary round
Team	Coeff.
(Gibraltar) Lincoln Red Imps	5.250
(Andorra) FC Santa Coloma	4.500
(Faroe Islands) B36	3.750
(San Marino) La Fiorita	3.000
(San Marino) Tre Penne	2.250
(Faroe Islands) NSÍ	2.250
(Faroe Islands) HB	2.000
(Andorra) Engordany	2.000
(Gibraltar) St Joseph's	1.750
(Kosovo) Prishtina	1.750
(Montenegro) Zeta	1.250
(Northern Ireland) Coleraine	1.250
(Wales) Barry Town United	1.000
(Northern Ireland) Glentoran	0.975
(Montenegro) Iskra	0.875
(Kosovo) Gjilani	0.800

Notes

1. ^{CL} Losers of Champions League second qualifying round (League Path).

== Format ==
In a change to the format as a result of the COVID-19 pandemic in Europe, each tie is played as a single-legged match hosted by one of the teams decided by draw. If scores are level at the end of normal time, extra time is played, followed by a penalty shoot-out if the scores remain tied.

In each draw of the Champions Path, teams (whose identity may not be known at the time of the draws) are divided into seeded and unseeded pots, which may contain different numbers of teams, based on the following principles:

- In the second qualifying round draw, 17 losers of the Champions League first qualifying round are seeded, and the three losers of the Champions League preliminary round are unseeded.
- In the third qualifying round draw, the eight losers of the Champions League second qualifying round are seeded and the ten winners of the second qualifying round are unseeded.
- In the play-off round draw, the five losers of the Champions League third qualifying round are seeded; the remaining two losers of the Champions League second qualifying round and the nine winners of the third qualifying round are unseeded.

In the beginning of the draws, a seeded team is drawn against an unseeded team until one of the pots is empty. Afterwards, the remaining teams from the non-empty pot are drawn against each other. For each tie, a draw is made between the two teams, and the first team drawn is the home team.

In each draw of the Main Path, teams are seeded based on their 2020 UEFA club coefficients. For any team whose club coefficients are not final at the time of a draw, their club coefficients at that time, taking into account of all 2019–20 UEFA Champions League and Europa League matches played up to that point, are used (Regulations Article 13.03). Teams are divided into seeded and unseeded pots containing the same number of teams, and a seeded team is drawn against an unseeded team. For each tie, a draw is made between the two teams, and the first team drawn is the home team. If the identity of the winners of the previous round is not known at the time of the draws, the seeding is carried out under the assumption that the team with the higher coefficient of an undecided tie advances to this round, which means if the team with the lower coefficient is to advance, it simply takes the seeding of its opponent. Teams from the same association or associations with political conflicts as decided by UEFA may not be drawn into the same tie. Prior to the draws, UEFA may form "groups" in accordance with the principles set by the Club Competitions Committee and based on geographical, logistical and political reasons, and they are purely for convenience of the draw and do not resemble any real groupings in the sense of the competition.

Due to the COVID-19 pandemic in Europe, all qualifying matches are played behind closed doors. The following special rules are applicable to the qualifying phase and play-offs:

- Prior to each draw, UEFA publish the list of known travel restrictions related to the COVID-19 pandemic. All teams must inform UEFA if there are other existing restrictions other than those published. If a team fails to do so which as a consequence the match cannot take place, the team is considered responsible and to have forfeited the match.
- If travel restrictions imposed by the home team's country prevent the away team from entering, the home team must propose an alternative venue that allows the match to take place without any restrictions. Otherwise they are considered to have forfeited the match.
- If travel restrictions imposed by the away team's country prevent the away team from leaving or returning, the home team must propose an alternative venue that allows the match to take place without any restrictions. Otherwise UEFA decide on a venue.
- If after the draw, new restrictions imposed by either the home team's or away team's country prevent the match from taking place, the team of that country are considered to have forfeited the match.
- If either team refuses to play the match, they are considered to have forfeited the match. If both teams refuse to play or are responsible for a match not taking place, both teams are disqualified.
- If a team has players and/or officials tested positive for SARS-2 coronavirus preventing them from playing the match before the deadline set by UEFA, they are considered to have forfeited the match.
- In all cases, the two teams may agree to play the match at the away team's country or at a neutral country, subject to UEFA's approval. UEFA has the final authority to decide on a venue for any match, or to reschedule any match if necessary.
- If, for any reason, the qualifying phase and play-offs cannot be completed before the deadline set by UEFA, UEFA decide on the principles for determining the teams qualified for the group stage.

Four countries (Poland, Hungary, Greece and Cyprus) have provided neutral venue hubs which allow matches to be played at their stadiums without restrictions.

== Schedule ==
The schedule of the competition was as follows (all draws were held at the UEFA headquarters in Nyon, Switzerland). The tournament would originally have started in June 2020, but had been delayed to August due to the COVID-19 pandemic in Europe. The new schedule was announced by the UEFA Executive Committee on 17 June 2020.

Round	Draw date	Match date
Preliminary round	9 August 2020	20 August 2020
First qualifying round	10 August 2020	27 August 2020
Second qualifying round	31 August 2020	17 September 2020
Third qualifying round	1 September 2020	24 September 2020
Play-off round	18 September 2020	1 October 2020

The original schedule of the competition, as planned before the pandemic, was as follows (all draws held at the UEFA headquarters in Nyon, Switzerland, unless stated otherwise).

Original schedule
Round	Draw date	First leg	Second leg
Preliminary round	9 June 2020	25 June 2020	2 July 2020
First qualifying round	16 June 2020	9 July 2020	16 July 2020
Second qualifying round	17 June 2020	23 July 2020	30 July 2020
Third qualifying round	20 July 2020	6 August 2020	13 August 2020
Play-off round	3 August 2020	20 August 2020	27 August 2020

== Preliminary round ==
The draw for the preliminary round was held on 9 August 2020, 13:00 CEST.

=== Seeding ===
A total of 16 teams played in the preliminary round. Seeding of teams was based on their 2020 UEFA club coefficients. The first team drawn in each tie were the home team. Teams from the same association could not be drawn against each other.

Group 1		Group 2	
Seeded	Unseeded	Seeded	Unseeded
(Gibraltar) Lincoln Red Imps; (Andorra) FC Santa Coloma; (San Marino) Tre Penne; (Andorra) Engordany	(Kosovo) Prishtina; (Montenegro) Zeta; (Montenegro) Iskra; (Kosovo) Gjilani	(Faroe Islands) B36; (San Marino) La Fiorita; (Faroe Islands) NSÍ; (Faroe Islands) HB	(Gibraltar) St Joseph's; (Northern Ireland) Coleraine; (Wales) Barry Town United; (Northern Ireland) Glentoran

=== Summary ===
The matches were played on 18, 20 and 21 August 2020. The match between Lincoln Red Imps and Prishtina on 18 August was postponed due to the whole Prishtina team being put into quarantine after eight players had tested positive for SARS-2 coronavirus. The game was rescheduled to 22 August, with Prishtina using UEFA regulations to sign on emergency loan players from rival Kosovar Superleague clubs Feronikel, Llapi, Trepca '89, Flamurtar, Ballkani, Drenica and Vushtrria in order to fulfil the fixture. However the rearranged fixture also had to be cancelled after 7 more players tested positive for coronavirus, and Lincoln Red Imps were awarded a technical 3–0 win by UEFA.

Home team	Score	Away team
Tre Penne (San Marino)	1–3	(Kosovo) Gjilani
Lincoln Red Imps (Gibraltar)	3–0 (Note: Lincoln Red Imps were awarded a 3–0 win after the match was cancelled due to Prishtina players testing positive for SARS-CoV-2.)	(Kosovo) Prishtina
FC Santa Coloma (Andorra)	0–0 (a.e.t.) (3–4 p)	(Montenegro) Iskra
Engordany (Andorra)	1–3	(Montenegro) Zeta
Glentoran (Northern Ireland)	1–0	(Faroe Islands) HB
St Joseph's (Gibraltar)	1–2	(Faroe Islands) B36
Coleraine (Northern Ireland)	1–0	(San Marino) La Fiorita
NSÍ (Faroe Islands)	5–1	(Wales) Barry Town United

=== Matches ===
21 August 2020 (Note: The Tre Penne v Gjilani match, originally scheduled to be played on 20 August 2020, 21:00, was postponed to 21 August 2020, 20:00, due to one player from Gjilani testing positive for SARS-2 coronavirus.)
20:00

Tre Penne (San Marino)	1–3	(Kosovo) Gjilani
Gai 16'	Report	Nikač 24'; Hajdari 64'; Hila 68'

San Marino Stadium, Serravalle
Attendance: 0
Referee: Alex Troleis (Faroe Islands)

22 August 2020 (Note: The Lincoln Red Imps v Prishtina match, originally scheduled to be played on 18 August 2020, was postponed to 22 August 2020 due to several members from Prishtina's delegation testing positive for SARS-2 coronavirus and the whole team being put into quarantine by the Gibraltarian authorities. On 22 August, the match could not be played due to eight players from Prishtina testing positive for SARS-2 coronavirus and the whole second team being put into quarantine by the Gibraltarian authorities. Lincoln Red Imps were subsequently awarded a technical 3–0 victory by UEFA according to the regulations related to COVID-19.)
18:00

Lincoln Red Imps (Gibraltar)	3–0 Awarded	(Kosovo) Prishtina
	Report

Victoria Stadium, Gibraltar
Attendance: 0
Referee: David Munro (Scotland)

20 August 2020
19:30

FC Santa Coloma (Andorra)	0–0 (a.e.t.)	(Montenegro) Iskra
	Report
Penalties
Cisteró (penalty scored); Miranda (penalty scored); Bouharma (penalty missed); Camochu (penalty scored); Santos (penalty missed)	3–4	(penalty scored) Đurišić; (penalty scored) Obradović; (penalty scored) Vuković; (penalty missed) Boričić; (penalty scored) Drinčić

Estadi Comunal, Andorra la Vella
Attendance: 0
Referee: Keith Kennedy (Northern Ireland)

18 August 2020
20:00

Engordany (Andorra)	1–3	(Montenegro) Zeta
Gómez 90+4' (pen.)	Report	Vukčević 45+1'; Mi. Lambulić 54'; L. Lambulić 63'

Estadi Comunal, Andorra la Vella
Attendance: 0
Referee: Juxhin Xhaja (Albania)

20 August 2020
20:00 (19:00 UTC+1)

Glentoran (Northern Ireland)	1–0	(Faroe Islands) HB
McDaid 42'	Report

The Oval, Belfast
Attendance: 0
Referee: Lukas Fähndrich (Switzerland)

20 August 2020
17:30

St Joseph's (Gibraltar)	1–2	(Faroe Islands) B36
Boro 30'	Report	Przybylski 28'; Mellemgaard 43' (pen.)

Victoria Stadium, Gibraltar
Attendance: 0
Referee: Jasmin Šabotić (Luxembourg)

20 August 2020
20:30 (19:30 UTC+1)

Coleraine (Northern Ireland)	1–0	(San Marino) La Fiorita
McLaughlin 89'	Report

The Showgrounds, Coleraine
Attendance: 0
Referee: Christian-Petru Ciochirca (Austria)

20 August 2020
19:00 (18:00 UTC+1)

NSÍ (Faroe Islands)	5–1	(Wales) Barry Town United
K. Olsen 52', 63', 74'; P. Knudsen 67'; Løkin 83'	Report	McLaggon 88'

Svangaskarð, Toftir (Note: NSÍ Runavík played their home match at Svangaskarð, Toftir, instead of their regular stadium Við Løkin, Runavík, which did not meet UEFA requirements.)
Attendance: 0
Referee: Pavel Rejžek (Czech Republic)

== First qualifying round ==
The draw for the first qualifying round was held on 10 August 2020, 13:00 CEST.

=== Seeding ===
A total of 94 teams played in the first qualifying round: 86 teams which entered in this round, and 8 winners of the preliminary round. Seeding of teams was based on their 2020 UEFA club coefficients from matches played through 8 August 2020. For the winners of the preliminary round, whose identity was not known at the time of draw, the club coefficient of the highest-ranked remaining team in each tie was used. The first team drawn in each tie would be the home team. Teams from the same association could not be drawn against each other. Numbers were pre-assigned for each team by UEFA, with the draw held in two runs, one for Groups 1–13 with six teams and one for Groups 14–15 with eight teams.

Group 1		Group 2		Group 3		Group 4		Group 5	
Seeded	Unseeded	Seeded	Unseeded	Seeded	Unseeded	Seeded	Unseeded	Seeded	Unseeded
(Slovenia) Maribor (2); (Slovenia) Olimpija Ljubljana (1); (Faroe Islands) B36 (3)	(Estonia) FCI Levadia (6); (Northern Ireland) Coleraine (4); (Iceland) Víkingur Reykjavík (5)	(Lithuania) Žalgiris (1); (Lithuania) Riteriai (2); (Hungary) Honvéd (3)	(Republic of Ireland) Derry City (4); (Finland) Inter Turku (6); (Estonia) Paide Linnameeskond (5)	(Bosnia and Herzegovina) Zrinjski Mostar (2); (Malta) Valletta (1); (Gibraltar) Lincoln Red Imps (3)	(Luxembourg) Differdange 03 (4); (Luxembourg) Union Titus Pétange (6); (Wales) Bala Town (5)	(Norway) Rosenborg (2); (Scotland) Aberdeen (1); (Scotland) Motherwell (3)	(Faroe Islands) NSÍ (5); (Northern Ireland) Glentoran (6); (Iceland) Breiðablik (4)	(Sweden) Malmö FF (1); (Albania) Kukësi (3); (Sweden) Hammarby IF (2)	(Bulgaria) Slavia Sofia (6); (Poland) Cracovia (5); (Hungary) Puskás Akadémia (4)
Group 6		Group 7		Group 8		Group 9		Group 10	
Seeded	Unseeded	Seeded	Unseeded	Seeded	Unseeded	Seeded	Unseeded	Seeded	Unseeded
(Belarus) Dinamo Minsk (3); (Latvia) Ventspils (2); (Belarus) Shakhtyor Soligorsk (1)	(Poland) Piast Gliwice (6); (Moldova) Sfîntul Gheorghe (5); (Moldova) Dinamo-Auto (4)	(Denmark) AGF (2); (Iceland) FH (3); (Republic of Ireland) Shamrock Rovers (1)	(Slovakia) DAC Dunajská Streda (6); (Finland) Ilves (5); (Finland) Honka (4)	(Wales) The New Saints (2); (Liechtenstein) Vaduz (1); (Switzerland) Servette (3)	(Malta) Hibernians (5); (Slovakia) Ružomberok (6); (Slovakia) Žilina (4)	(Israel) Hapoel Be'er Sheva (3); (Azerbaijan) Neftçi (2); (Azerbaijan) Keşla (1)	(Albania) Laçi (5); (North Macedonia) Shkupi (4); (Georgia (country)) Dinamo Batumi (6)	(Hungary) MOL Fehérvár (3); (Estonia) Nõmme Kalju (2); (Norway) Bodø/Glimt (1)	(Slovenia) Mura (4); (Lithuania) Kauno Žalgiris (5); (Republic of Ireland) Bohemians (6)
Group 11		Group 12		Group 13		Group 14		Group 15	
Seeded	Unseeded	Seeded	Unseeded	Seeded	Unseeded	Seeded	Unseeded	Seeded	Unseeded
(Cyprus) Apollon Limassol (2); (Armenia) Alashkert (3); (Israel) Maccabi Haifa (1)	(Bosnia and Herzegovina) Željezničar (5); (Georgia (country)) Saburtalo Tbilisi (4); (North Macedonia) Renova (6)	(Serbia) Partizan (2); (Poland) Lech Poznań (1); (Kazakhstan) Ordabasy (3)	(Romania) Botoșani (6); (Latvia) RFS (4); (Latvia) Valmiera (5)	(Romania) FCSB (2); (Luxembourg) Progrès Niederkorn (1); (Bulgaria) CSKA Sofia (3)	(Montenegro) Zeta (5); (Armenia) Shirak (4); (Malta) Sirens (6)	(North Macedonia) Shkëndija (2); (Kazakhstan) Kairat (4); (Serbia) TSC (3); (Romania) Universitatea Craiova (1)	(Azerbaijan) Sumgayit (6); (Moldova) Petrocub Hîncești (7); (Armenia) Noah (5); (Georgia (country)) Locomotive Tbilisi (8)	(Cyprus) APOEL (1); (Montenegro) Iskra (4); (Montenegro) Sutjeska (2); (Israel) Beitar Jerusalem (3)	(Bulgaria) Lokomotiv Plovdiv (5); (Kosovo) Gjilani (8); (Albania) Teuta (7); (Bosnia and Herzegovina) Borac Banja Luka (6)

Notes

1. ^{†} Winners of the preliminary round, whose identity was not known at the time of draw. Teams in italics defeated a team with a higher coefficient, thus effectively taking the coefficient of their opponent in the draw.
2. ^{‡} Club coefficients from matches played through 8 August 2020 (AGF: 5.800, Servette: 5.240) were used for the first qualifying round draw, as their 2020 club coefficients were not final at the time of the first qualifying round draw (Regulations Article 13.03).

=== Summary ===
Most matches were played on 25, 26 and 27 August 2020, however two matches were postponed to 9 and 10 September 2020.

Home team	Score	Away team
Maribor (Slovenia)	1–1 (a.e.t.) (4–5 p)	(Northern Ireland) Coleraine
Olimpija Ljubljana (Slovenia)	2–1 (a.e.t.)	(Iceland) Víkingur Reykjavík
B36 (Faroe Islands)	4–3 (a.e.t.)	(Estonia) FCI Levadia
Riteriai (Lithuania)	3–2 (a.e.t.)	(Republic of Ireland) Derry City
Žalgiris (Lithuania)	2–0	(Estonia) Paide Linnameeskond
Honvéd (Hungary)	2–1 (a.e.t.)	(Finland) Inter Turku
Zrinjski Mostar (Bosnia and Herzegovina)	3–0	(Luxembourg) Differdange 03
Valletta (Malta)	0–1	(Wales) Bala Town
Lincoln Red Imps (Gibraltar)	2–0	(Luxembourg) Union Titus Pétange
Rosenborg (Norway)	4–2	(Iceland) Breiðablik
Aberdeen (Scotland)	6–0	(Faroe Islands) NSÍ
Motherwell (Scotland)	5–1	(Northern Ireland) Glentoran
Hammarby IF (Sweden)	3–0	(Hungary) Puskás Akadémia
Malmö FF (Sweden)	2–0	(Poland) Cracovia
Kukësi (Albania)	2–1	(Bulgaria) Slavia Sofia
Ventspils (Latvia)	2–1	(Moldova) Dinamo-Auto
Shakhtyor Soligorsk (Belarus)	0–0 (a.e.t.) (1–4 p)	(Moldova) Sfîntul Gheorghe
Dinamo Minsk (Belarus)	0–2	(Poland) Piast Gliwice
AGF (Denmark)	5–2	(Finland) Honka
Shamrock Rovers (Republic of Ireland)	2–2 (a.e.t.) (12–11 p)	(Finland) Ilves
FH (Iceland)	0–2	(Slovakia) DAC Dunajská Streda
The New Saints (Wales)	3–1 (a.e.t.)	(Slovakia) Žilina
Vaduz (Liechtenstein)	0–2	(Malta) Hibernians
Servette (Switzerland)	3–0	(Slovakia) Ružomberok
Neftçi (Azerbaijan)	2–1	(North Macedonia) Shkupi
Keşla (Azerbaijan)	0–0 (a.e.t.) (4–5 p)	(Albania) Laçi
Hapoel Be'er Sheva (Israel)	3–0	(Georgia (country)) Dinamo Batumi
Nõmme Kalju (Estonia)	0–4	(Slovenia) Mura
Bodø/Glimt (Norway)	6–1	(Lithuania) Kauno Žalgiris
MOL Fehérvár (Hungary)	1–1 (a.e.t.) (4–2 p)	(Republic of Ireland) Bohemians
Apollon Limassol (Cyprus)	5–1	(Georgia (country)) Saburtalo Tbilisi
Maccabi Haifa (Israel)	3–1	(Bosnia and Herzegovina) Željezničar
Alashkert (Armenia)	0–1	(North Macedonia) Renova
Partizan (Serbia)	1–0	(Latvia) RFS
Lech Poznań (Poland)	3–0	(Latvia) Valmiera
Ordabasy (Kazakhstan)	1–2	(Romania) Botoșani
FCSB (Romania)	3–0	(Armenia) Shirak
Progrès Niederkorn (Luxembourg)	3–0	(Montenegro) Zeta
CSKA Sofia (Bulgaria)	2–1	(Malta) Sirens
Petrocub Hîncești (Moldova)	0–2	(Serbia) TSC
Sumgayit (Azerbaijan)	0–2	(North Macedonia) Shkëndija
Kairat (Kazakhstan)	4–1	(Armenia) Noah
Locomotive Tbilisi (Georgia (country))	2–1	(Romania) Universitatea Craiova
Teuta (Albania)	2–0	(Israel) Beitar Jerusalem
Borac Banja Luka (Bosnia and Herzegovina)	1–0	(Montenegro) Sutjeska
Iskra (Montenegro)	0–1	(Bulgaria) Lokomotiv Plovdiv
Gjilani (Kosovo)	0–2 (a.e.t.)	(Cyprus) APOEL

=== Matches ===
27 August 2020
20:45

Maribor (Slovenia)	1–1 (a.e.t.)	(Northern Ireland) Coleraine
Vancaš 65'	Report	McLaughlin 62'
Penalties
Dervišević (penalty scored); Mlakar (penalty scored); Tavares (penalty scored); Mešanović (penalty scored); Vancaš (penalty missed)	4–5	(penalty scored) Parkhill; (penalty scored) Kane; (penalty scored) McConaghie; (penalty scored) Bradley; (penalty scored) Doherty

Ljudski vrt, Maribor
Attendance: 0
Referee: Kai Erik Steen (Norway)

27 August 2020
18:30

Olimpija Ljubljana (Slovenia)	2–1 (a.e.t.)	(Iceland) Víkingur Reykjavík
Fink 88'; Bosić 106'	Report	Karlsson 27'

Stožice Stadium, Ljubljana
Attendance: 0
Referee: Walter Altmann (Austria)

27 August 2020
20:00 (19:00 UTC+1)

B36 (Faroe Islands)	4–3 (a.e.t.)	(Estonia) FCI Levadia
Pingel 72', 76'; R. Samuelsen 106'; Agnarsson 113'	Report	Õigus 52'; Elhi 79'; Manucho 101'

Tórsvøllur, Tórshavn (Note: B36 Tórshavn played their home matches at Tórsvøllur, Tórshavn, instead of their regular stadium Gundadalur, Tórshavn, which did not meet UEFA requirements.)
Attendance: 0
Referee: Donald Robertson (Scotland)

25 August 2020
18:00 (19:00 UTC+3)

Riteriai (Lithuania)	3–2 (a.e.t.)	(Republic of Ireland) Derry City
G. Paulauskas 39', 49'; Kazlauskas 91'	Report	Thomson 18'; Toal 63'

LFF Stadium, Vilnius
Attendance: 0
Referee: Ville Nevalainen (Finland)

27 August 2020
19:00 (20:00 UTC+3)

Žalgiris (Lithuania)	2–0	(Estonia) Paide Linnameeskond
Kaluđerović 9'; Antal 32'	Report

LFF Stadium, Vilnius
Attendance: 0
Referee: Petri Viljanen (Finland)

27 August 2020
21:00

Honvéd (Hungary)	2–1 (a.e.t.)	(Finland) Inter Turku
Traoré 90'; Hämäläinen 105' (o.g.)	Report	Liliu 90+1'

Hidegkuti Nándor Stadion, Budapest (Note: Honvéd played their home matches at Hidegkuti Nándor Stadion, Budapest, instead of their regular stadium Bozsik József Stadion, Budapest, as it was demolished to be replaced by their new stadium Bozsik Aréna, Budapest.)
Attendance: 0
Referee: Gal Leibovitz (Israel)

27 August 2020
20:00

Zrinjski Mostar (Bosnia and Herzegovina)	3–0	(Luxembourg) Differdange 03
Bilbija 37'; Filipović 40'; Ivančić 80'	Report

Stadion pod Bijelim Brijegom, Mostar
Attendance: 0
Referee: Aristotelis Diamantopoulos (Greece)

27 August 2020
20:00

Valletta (Malta)	0–1	(Wales) Bala Town
	Report	Venables 38'

Centenary Stadium, Ta' Qali
Attendance: 0
Referee: Luca Barbeno (San Marino)

27 August 2020
17:30

Lincoln Red Imps (Gibraltar)	2–0	(Luxembourg) Union Titus Pétange
L. Casciaro 36'; Yahaya 90+5'	Report

Victoria Stadium, Gibraltar
Attendance: 0
Referee: Helgi Mikael Jónasson (Iceland)

27 August 2020
19:00

Rosenborg (Norway)	4–2	(Iceland) Breiðablik
Børven 4', 29'; Reginiussen 17'; Hovland 24'	Report	V. Einarsson 61'; Mikkelsen 90+1' (pen.)

Lerkendal Stadion, Trondheim
Attendance: 0
Referee: Matthew De Gabriele (Malta)

27 August 2020
20:45 (19:45 UTC+1)

Aberdeen (Scotland)	6–0	(Faroe Islands) NSÍ
Ferguson 37'; Main 43'; Hedges 50', 59', 86' (pen.); Hayes 63'	Report

Pittodrie Stadium, Aberdeen
Attendance: 0
Referee: Ívar Orri Kristjánsson (Iceland)

27 August 2020
20:45 (19:45 UTC+1)

Motherwell (Scotland)	5–1	(Northern Ireland) Glentoran
Lang 58'; O'Donnell 72'; Polworth 75'; Watt 78'; Long 87'	Report	McDaid 90' (pen.)

Fir Park, Motherwell
Attendance: 0
Referee: Bram Van Driessche (Belgium)

27 August 2020
19:00

Hammarby IF (Sweden)	3–0	(Hungary) Puskás Akadémia
A. Khalili 14'; Bojanić 32'; Paulinho 84'	Report

Tele2 Arena, Stockholm
Attendance: 0
Referee: Mario Zebec (Croatia)

27 August 2020
19:00

Malmö FF (Sweden)	2–0	(Poland) Cracovia
Berget 1'; Rieks 44'	Report

Stadion, Malmö
Attendance: 0
Referee: Urs Schnyder (Switzerland)

27 August 2020
20:00

Kukësi (Albania)	2–1	(Bulgaria) Slavia Sofia
Friday 56' (pen.); Cooper 85'	Report	K. Krastev 81'

Arena Kombëtare, Tirana (Note: Kukësi played their home matches at Arena Kombëtare, Tirana, instead of their regular stadium Zeqir Ymeri Stadium, Kukës, which is under reconstruction.)
Attendance: 0
Referee: Arda Kardeşler (Turkey)

27 August 2020
16:00 (17:00 UTC+3)

Ventspils (Latvia)	2–1	(Moldova) Dinamo-Auto
Villela 22'; Kozlov 75' (pen.)	Report	D. Rogac 15'

Olimpiskais Stadions, Ventspils
Attendance: 0
Referee: Eldorjan Hamiti (Albania)

27 August 2020
19:30 (20:30 UTC+3)

Shakhtyor Soligorsk (Belarus)	0–0 (a.e.t.)	(Moldova) Sfîntul Gheorghe
	Report
Penalties
Yakhshiboev (penalty missed); Sotnikaw (penalty missed); Sachywka (penalty scored)	1–4	(penalty scored) Slivca; (penalty scored) Iurcu; (penalty scored) Volkov; (penalty scored) Suvorov

Stroitel Stadium, Salihorsk
Attendance: 0
Referee: Dragan Petrović (Bosnia and Herzegovina)

27 August 2020
17:00 (18:00 UTC+3)

Dinamo Minsk (Belarus)	0–2	(Poland) Piast Gliwice
	Report	Lipski 10'; Świerczok 56'

Dinamo Stadium, Minsk
Attendance: 0
Referee: Lazar Lukić (Serbia)

27 August 2020
19:00

AGF (Denmark)	5–2	(Finland) Honka
Tingager 21'; Mortensen 29', 45+2' (pen.); Olsen 90+1'; Tengstedt 90+2'	Report	Martín 35'; Kaufmann 64'

Aarhus Stadium, Aarhus
Attendance: 0
Referee: Ioannis Papadopoulos (Greece)

27 August 2020
21:00 (20:00 UTC+1)

Shamrock Rovers (Republic of Ireland)	2–2 (a.e.t.)	(Finland) Ilves
Burke 14'; Lopes 78'	Report	Ala-Myllymäki 10' (pen.); Veteli 62'
Penalties
Byrne (penalty missed); O'Brien (penalty scored); Watts (penalty scored); O'Neill (penalty scored); McEneff (penalty scored); Williams (penalty scored); Lopes (penalty scored); Lafferty (penalty scored); Finn (penalty scored); Mannus (penalty scored); Watts (penalty scored); McEneff (penalty scored); O'Brien (penalty scored)	12–11	(penalty scored) Ala-Myllymäki; (penalty missed) Jair; (penalty scored) Raittinen; (penalty scored) Siira; (penalty scored) Skyttä; (penalty scored) Mömmö; (penalty scored) Tomas; (penalty scored) Almén; (penalty scored) Miettunen; (penalty scored) Hilander; (penalty scored) Ala-Myllymäki; (penalty scored) Jair; (penalty missed) Raittinen

Tallaght Stadium, Tallaght
Attendance: 0
Referee: Michal Ocenáš (Slovakia)

27 August 2020
19:15 (17:15 UTC+0)

FH (Iceland)	0–2	(Slovakia) DAC Dunajská Streda
	Report	Balić 23'; Ramírez 76'

Kaplakriki, Hafnarfjörður
Attendance: 0
Referee: Jason Barcelo (Gibraltar)

27 August 2020
19:30 (18:30 UTC+1)

The New Saints (Wales)	3–1 (a.e.t.)	(Slovakia) Žilina
Robles 56'; Smith 100'; Cieślewicz 108' (pen.)	Report	Myslovič 77' (pen.)

Park Hall, Oswestry
Attendance: 0
Referee: Manfredas Lukjančukas (Lithuania)

27 August 2020
19:00

Vaduz (Liechtenstein)	0–2	(Malta) Hibernians
	Report	Degabriele 34', 57'

Rheinpark Stadion, Vaduz
Attendance: 0
Referee: Luís Teixeira (Portugal)

27 August 2020
20:15

Servette (Switzerland)	3–0	(Slovakia) Ružomberok
Stevanović 54'; Mendy 77'; Antunes 86'	Report

Stade de Genève, Geneva
Attendance: 0
Referee: Viktor Kopiievskyi (Ukraine)

27 August 2020
18:00 (20:00 UTC+4)

Neftçi (Azerbaijan)	2–1	(North Macedonia) Shkupi
Bougrine 66'; Krivotsyuk 88'	Report	Darboe 90+3'

Eighth Kilometer District Stadium, Baku
Attendance: 0
Referee: Aleksandrs Golubevs (Latvia)

27 August 2020
19:00 (21:00 UTC+4)

Keşla (Azerbaijan)	0–0 (a.e.t.)	(Albania) Laçi
	Report
Penalties
Klyots (penalty scored); Sílvio (penalty scored); Akhundov (penalty scored); Hajiyev (penalty scored); Qirtimov (penalty missed)	4–5	(penalty scored) Nwabueze; (penalty scored) Lushkja; (penalty scored) D. Rapo; (penalty scored) Mazrekaj; (penalty scored) Ignjatović

ASK Arena, Baku
Attendance: 0
Referee: Georgi Kikacheishvili (Georgia)

27 August 2020
19:45 (20:45 UTC+3)

Hapoel Be'er Sheva (Israel)	3–0	(Georgia (country)) Dinamo Batumi
Josué 9', 61'; Kobakhidze 21' (o.g.)	Report

HaMoshava Stadium, Petah Tikva (Note: Hapoel Be'er Sheva played their home matches at HaMoshava Stadium, Petah Tikva, instead of their regular stadium Turner Stadium, Be'er Sheva, which was temporarily closed for structural problems with the roof.)
Attendance: 0
Referee: Aleksandrs Anufrijevs (Latvia)

10 September 2020 (Note: The Nõmme Kalju v Mura match, originally scheduled to be played on 27 August 2020, 16:30 (17:30 UTC+3), at Kadriorg Stadium, Tallinn, was postponed to 10 September 2020, 19:30 CEST, and moved to Szusza Ferenc Stadion, Újpest, Hungary, due to one player from Nõmme Kalju and one player from Mura testing positive for SARS-2 coronavirus, after Meistriliiga and Slovenian PrvaLiga matches on 22 August respectively, and both whole teams being put into quarantine by the Estonian authorities.)
19:30

Nõmme Kalju (Estonia)	0–4	(Slovenia) Mura
	Report	Žižek 17', 27'; Kous 32'; Kozar 36'

Szusza Ferenc Stadion, Budapest, Hungary
Attendance: 0
Referee: Robert Hennessy (Republic of Ireland)

27 August 2020
18:00

Bodø/Glimt (Norway)	6–1	(Lithuania) Kauno Žalgiris
Zinckernagel 27', 36'; Hauge 52', 59' (pen.); Boniface 79'; Tounekti 81'	Report	Otele 78'

Aspmyra Stadion, Bodø
Attendance: 0
Referee: Kaarlo Oskari Hämäläinen (Finland)

27 August 2020
18:30

MOL Fehérvár (Hungary)	1–1 (a.e.t.)	(Republic of Ireland) Bohemians
Nikolić 37' (pen.)	Report	Ward 22'
Penalties
Hodžić (penalty missed); Nikolov (penalty scored); Géresi (penalty scored); Stopira (penalty scored); Houri (penalty scored)	4–2	(penalty scored) Mandroiu; (penalty scored) Levingston; (penalty missed) Casey; (penalty missed) Twardek

MOL Aréna Sóstó, Székesfehérvár
Attendance: 0
Referee: Timohethos Christofi (Cyprus)

27 August 2020
18:00 (19:00 UTC+3)

Apollon Limassol (Cyprus)	5–1	(Georgia (country)) Saburtalo Tbilisi
Dabo 4', 32', 76'; Diguiny 59'; Gianniotas 86'	Report	Guliashvili 69'

GSP Stadium, Nicosia (Note: Apollon Limassol played their home matches at GSP Stadium, Nicosia, instead of their regular stadium Tsirio Stadium, Limassol, which did not meet UEFA requirements.)
Attendance: 0
Referee: Adrien Jaccottet (Switzerland)

9 September 2020 (Note: The Maccabi Haifa v Željezničar match, originally scheduled to be played on 27 August 2020, 19:00 (20:00 UTC+3), was postponed to 9 September 2020, 19:00 (20:00 UTC+3), due to five members from Željezničar's delegation testing positive for SARS-2 coronavirus and the whole team being put into quarantine by the Israeli authorities.)
19:00 (20:00 UTC+3)

Maccabi Haifa (Israel)	3–1	(Bosnia and Herzegovina) Željezničar
Chery 38'; Rukavytsya 59'; Ashkenazi 66'	Report	Lendrić 34'

Sammy Ofer Stadium, Haifa
Attendance: 0
Referee: Jørgen Burchardt (Denmark)

27 August 2020
18:00 (20:00 UTC+4)

Alashkert (Armenia)	0–1	(North Macedonia) Renova
	Report	Mishkovski 58'

Vazgen Sargsyan Republican Stadium, Yerevan (Note: Alashkert played their home match at Vazgen Sargsyan Republican Stadium, Yerevan, instead of their regular stadium Alashkert Stadium, Yerevan, which did not meet UEFA requirements.)
Attendance: 0
Referee: Nick Walsh (Scotland)

27 August 2020
21:00

Partizan (Serbia)	1–0	(Latvia) RFS
Natkho 52' (pen.)	Report

Partizan Stadium, Belgrade
Attendance: 0
Referee: Zaven Hovhannisyan (Armenia)

27 August 2020
21:00

Lech Poznań (Poland)	3–0	(Latvia) Valmiera
Ishak 59', 78'; Szymczak 88'	Report

Stadion Miejski, Poznań
Attendance: 0
Referee: Ondřej Pechanec (Czech Republic)

27 August 2020
16:00 (20:00 UTC+6)

Ordabasy (Kazakhstan)	1–2	(Romania) Botoșani
Mahlangu 31'	Report	Holzmann 25'; Dugandžić 33'

Kazhymukan Munaitpasov Stadium, Shymkent
Attendance: 0
Referee: Rauf Jabarov (Azerbaijan)

27 August 2020
20:30 (21:30 UTC+3)

FCSB (Romania)	3–0	(Armenia) Shirak
Olaru 34'; Tănase 65' (pen.); Buziuc 83'	Report

Arena Națională, Bucharest
Attendance: 0
Referee: Admir Šehović (Bosnia and Herzegovina)

26 August 2020
18:30

Progrès Niederkorn (Luxembourg)	3–0	(Montenegro) Zeta
Tekiela 11', 55' (pen.); Thill 90+2'	Report

Stade Municipal, Differdange (Note: Progrès Niederkorn played their home matches at Stade Municipal, Differdange, instead of their regular stadium Stade Jos Haupert, Niederkorn, which did not meet UEFA requirements.)
Attendance: 0
Referee: Rahim Hasanov (Azerbaijan)

27 August 2020
19:00 (20:00 UTC+3)

CSKA Sofia (Bulgaria)	2–1	(Malta) Sirens
Ahmedov 75'; Sowe 90+1'	Report	Maxuell 69'

Stadion Balgarska Armia, Sofia
Attendance: 0
Referee: Krzysztof Jakubik (Poland)

27 August 2020
20:00 (21:00 UTC+3)

Petrocub Hîncești (Moldova)	0–2	(Serbia) TSC
	Report	Tomanović 17'; Lukić 55' (pen.)

Zimbru Stadium, Chișinău (Note: Petrocub Hîncești played their home match at Zimbru Stadium, Chișinău, instead of their regular stadium Stadionul Municipal, Hîncești, which did not meet UEFA requirements.)
Attendance: 0
Referee: Sebastian Colțescu (Romania)

27 August 2020
18:00 (20:00 UTC+4)

Sumgayit (Azerbaijan)	0–2	(North Macedonia) Shkëndija
	Report	Ibraimi 55' (pen.); Doriev 89' (pen.)

Kapital Bank Arena, Sumqayit
Attendance: 0
Referee: Arman Ismuratov (Kazakhstan)

27 August 2020
16:00 (20:00 UTC+6)

Kairat (Kazakhstan)	4–1	(Armenia) Noah
Alykulov 12'; Vágner Love 35', 70'; Eseola 90+4'	Report	Bor 8'

Central Stadium, Almaty
Attendance: 0
Referee: Kristoffer Karlsson (Sweden)

27 August 2020
19:00 (21:00 UTC+4)

Locomotive Tbilisi (Georgia (country))	2–1	(Romania) Universitatea Craiova
Sikharulidze 57'; Oulad Omar 61'	Report	Baiaram 90+4'

Mikheil Meskhi Stadium pitch 2, Tbilisi
Attendance: 0
Referee: Miloš Đorđić (Serbia)

27 August 2020
16:30

Teuta (Albania)	2–0	(Israel) Beitar Jerusalem
Krasniqi 6'; Hebaj 87'	Report

Niko Dovana Stadium, Durrës
Attendance: 0
Referee: Nikolas Neokleous (Cyprus)

27 August 2020
16:30

Borac Banja Luka (Bosnia and Herzegovina)	1–0	(Montenegro) Sutjeska
Vranješ 35'	Report

City Stadium, Banja Luka
Attendance: 0
Referee: Morten Krogh (Denmark)

27 August 2020
20:00

Iskra (Montenegro)	0–1	(Bulgaria) Lokomotiv Plovdiv
	Report	Iliev 75' (pen.)

City Stadium, Podgorica (Note: Iskra Danilovgrad played their home match at City Stadium, Podgorica, instead of their regular stadium Braća Velašević Stadium, Danilovgrad, which did not meet UEFA requirements.)
Attendance: 0
Referee: Gergő Bogár (Hungary)

27 August 2020
19:00

Gjilani (Kosovo)	0–2 (a.e.t.)	(Cyprus) APOEL
	Report	Efrem 102'; Ndongala 116'

Fadil Vokrri Stadium, Pristina (Note: Gjilani played their home match at Fadil Vokrri Stadium, Pristina, instead of their regular stadium City Stadium, Gjilan, which is under reconstruction.)
Attendance: 0
Referee: Yigal Frid (Israel)

== Second qualifying round ==
The draw for the second qualifying round was held on 31 August 2020, 13:00 CEST.

=== Seeding ===
A total of 92 teams played in the second qualifying round. They were divided into two paths:

- Champions Path (20 teams): 3 losers of the 2020–21 UEFA Champions League preliminary round, and 17 losers of the 2020–21 UEFA Champions League first qualifying round.
- Main Path (72 teams): 25 teams which entered in this round, and 47 winners of the first qualifying round.

Seeding of teams in the Champions Path was based on the round they are eliminated from the Champions League. Seeding of teams in the Main Path was based on their 2020 UEFA club coefficients. For the winners of the two postponed first round matches, whose identity was not known at the time of draw, the club coefficient of the highest-ranked remaining team in each tie was used. The first team drawn in each tie would be the home team. Teams from the same association could not be drawn against each other. Numbers were pre-assigned for each team in the Main Path by UEFA, with the draw held in one run for all Groups 1–12 with six teams.

Champions Path
Group 1		Group 2		Group 3	
Seeded	Unseeded	Seeded	Unseeded	Seeded	Unseeded
(Republic of Ireland) Dundalk; (Slovakia) Slovan Bratislava; (Northern Ireland) Linfield; (Finland) KuPS; (Malta) Floriana	(Andorra) Inter Club d'Escaldes	(Sweden) Djurgårdens IF; (Estonia) Flora; (Latvia) Riga; (Gibraltar) Europa; (Iceland) KR	(San Marino) Tre Fiori	(Kazakhstan) Astana; (Georgia (country)) Dinamo Tbilisi; (Luxembourg) Fola Esch; (Montenegro) Budućnost Podgorica; (Wales) Connah's Quay Nomads; Ararat-Armenia; (North Macedonia) Sileks	(Kosovo) Drita

Notes

1. ^{†} Losers of the Champions League first qualifying round.
2. ^{‡} Losers of the Champions League preliminary round.

Main Path
Group 1		Group 2		Group 3		Group 4	
Seeded	Unseeded	Seeded	Unseeded	Seeded	Unseeded	Seeded	Unseeded
(Cyprus) APOEL (1); (Poland) Lech Poznań (3); (Denmark) AGF (2)	(Slovenia) Mura (4); (Sweden) Hammarby IF (6); (Kazakhstan) Kaisar (5)	(Turkey) Galatasaray (2); (Russia) Dynamo Moscow (1); (Kazakhstan) Kairat (3)	(Israel) Maccabi Haifa (6); (Azerbaijan) Neftçi (4); (Georgia (country)) Locomotive Tbilisi (5)	(Denmark) Copenhagen (2); (Wales) The New Saints (3); (Scotland) Motherwell (1)	(Sweden) IFK Göteborg (4); (Faroe Islands) B36 (6); (Northern Ireland) Coleraine (5)	(Romania) FCSB (3); (Spain) Granada (1); (Cyprus) Apollon Limassol (2)	(Greece) OFI (4); (Serbia) TSC (6); (Albania) Teuta (5)
Group 5		Group 6		Group 7		Group 8	
Seeded	Unseeded	Seeded	Unseeded	Seeded	Unseeded	Seeded	Unseeded
(Belgium) Standard Liège (2); (Netherlands) Willem II (3); (Scotland) Aberdeen (1)	(Norway) Viking (5); (Luxembourg) Progrès Niederkorn (6); (Wales) Bala Town (4)	(Belarus) BATE Borisov (1); (Serbia) Partizan (3); (North Macedonia) Shkëndija (2)	(Bulgaria) CSKA Sofia (5); (Romania) Botoșani (4); (Moldova) Sfîntul Gheorghe (6)	(England) Tottenham Hotspur (3); (Israel) Hapoel Be'er Sheva (1); (Ukraine) Kolos Kovalivka (2)	(Greece) Aris (4); (Bulgaria) Lokomotiv Plovdiv (6); (Albania) Laçi (5)	(Sweden) Malmö FF (3); (Norway) Rosenborg (1); (Czech Republic) Slovan Liberec (2)	(Latvia) Ventspils (5); (Lithuania) Riteriai (4); (Hungary) Honvéd (6)
Group 9		Group 10		Group 11		Group 12	
Seeded	Unseeded	Seeded	Unseeded	Seeded	Unseeded	Seeded	Unseeded
(Scotland) Rangers (3); (France) Reims (1); (Portugal) Rio Ave (2)	(Switzerland) Servette (5); (Gibraltar) Lincoln Red Imps (6); (Bosnia and Herzegovina) Borac Banja Luka (4)	(Germany) VfL Wolfsburg (2); (Croatia) Hajduk Split (3); (Bosnia and Herzegovina) Zrinjski Mostar (1)	(Albania) Kukësi (4); (Slovenia) Olimpija Ljubljana (5); (North Macedonia) Renova (6)	(Switzerland) Basel (2); (Czech Republic) Jablonec (3); (Austria) Hartberg (1)	(Croatia) Osijek (4); (Poland) Piast Gliwice (5); (Slovakia) DAC Dunajská Streda (6)	(Italy) Milan (3); (Hungary) MOL Fehérvár (1); (Lithuania) Žalgiris (2)	(Norway) Bodø/Glimt (4); (Republic of Ireland) Shamrock Rovers (6); (Malta) Hibernians (5)

Notes

1. ^{†} Winners of the first qualifying round.
2. ^{‡} Winners of postponed first qualifying round matches, whose identity was not known at the time of draw. Teams in italics defeated a team with a higher coefficient, thus effectively taking the coefficient of their opponent in the draw.

=== Summary ===
The matches were played on 16, 17 and 18 September 2020.

Second qualifying round
Home team	Score	Away team
Champions Path
Inter Club d'Escaldes (Andorra)	0–1	(Republic of Ireland) Dundalk
KuPS (Finland)	1–1 (a.e.t.) (4–3 p)	(Slovakia) Slovan Bratislava
Linfield (Northern Ireland)	0–1	(Malta) Floriana
Riga (Latvia)	1–0	(San Marino) Tre Fiori
Djurgårdens IF (Sweden)	2–1	(Gibraltar) Europa
Flora (Estonia)	2–1	(Iceland) KR
Sileks (North Macedonia)	0–2	(Kosovo) Drita
Astana (Kazakhstan)	0–1	(Montenegro) Budućnost Podgorica
Ararat-Armenia	4–3 (a.e.t.)	(Luxembourg) Fola Esch
Connah's Quay Nomads (Wales)	0–1	(Georgia (country)) Dinamo Tbilisi
Main Path
Hammarby IF (Sweden)	0–3	(Poland) Lech Poznań
Kaisar (Kazakhstan)	1–4	(Cyprus) APOEL
Mura (Slovenia)	3–0	(Denmark) AGF
Maccabi Haifa (Israel)	2–1	(Kazakhstan) Kairat
Locomotive Tbilisi (Georgia (country))	2–1	(Russia) Dynamo Moscow
Neftçi (Azerbaijan)	1–3	(Turkey) Galatasaray
B36 (Faroe Islands)	2–2 (a.e.t.) (5–4 p)	(Wales) The New Saints
Coleraine (Northern Ireland)	2–2 (a.e.t.) (0–3 p)	(Scotland) Motherwell
IFK Göteborg (Sweden)	1–2	(Denmark) Copenhagen
TSC (Serbia)	6–6 (a.e.t.) (4–5 p)	(Romania) FCSB
Teuta (Albania)	0–4	(Spain) Granada
OFI (Greece)	0–1	(Cyprus) Apollon Limassol
Progrès Niederkorn (Luxembourg)	0–5	(Netherlands) Willem II
Viking (Norway)	0–2	(Scotland) Aberdeen
Standard Liège (Belgium)	2–0 (Note: Bala Town were drawn as the home team in the original draw, but the tie was switched to a home match of Standard Liège due to the inability of Bala Town to secure a suitable venue.)	(Wales) Bala Town
Sfîntul Gheorghe (Moldova)	0–1 (a.e.t.)	(Serbia) Partizan
CSKA Sofia (Bulgaria)	2–0	(Belarus) BATE Borisov
Botoșani (Romania)	0–1	(North Macedonia) Shkëndija
Lokomotiv Plovdiv (Bulgaria)	1–2	(England) Tottenham Hotspur
Laçi (Albania)	1–2	(Israel) Hapoel Be'er Sheva
Aris (Greece)	1–2	(Ukraine) Kolos Kovalivka
Honvéd (Hungary)	0–2	(Sweden) Malmö FF
Ventspils (Latvia)	1–5	(Norway) Rosenborg
Riteriai (Lithuania)	1–5	(Czech Republic) Slovan Liberec
Lincoln Red Imps (Gibraltar)	0–5	(Scotland) Rangers
Servette (Switzerland)	0–1	(France) Reims
Borac Banja Luka (Bosnia and Herzegovina)	0–2	(Portugal) Rio Ave
Renova (North Macedonia)	0–1	(Croatia) Hajduk Split
Olimpija Ljubljana (Slovenia)	2–3 (a.e.t.)	(Bosnia and Herzegovina) Zrinjski Mostar
Kukësi (Albania)	0–4	(Germany) VfL Wolfsburg
DAC Dunajská Streda (Slovakia)	5–3 (a.e.t.)	(Czech Republic) Jablonec
Piast Gliwice (Poland)	3–2	(Austria) Hartberg
Osijek (Croatia)	1–2	(Switzerland) Basel
Shamrock Rovers (Republic of Ireland)	0–2	(Italy) Milan
Hibernians (Malta)	0–1	(Hungary) MOL Fehérvár
Bodø/Glimt (Norway)	3–1	(Lithuania) Žalgiris

=== Champions Path matches ===
17 September 2020
19:30

Inter Club d'Escaldes (Andorra)	0–1	(Republic of Ireland) Dundalk
	Report	McMillan 14'

Estadi Comunal, Andorra la Vella
Attendance: 0
Referee: Viktor Shimusik (Belarus)

17 September 2020
17:30 (18:30 UTC+3)

KuPS (Finland)	1–1 (a.e.t.)	(Slovakia) Slovan Bratislava
Udo 120'	Report	Medved 111'
Penalties
Pennanen (penalty scored); Udo (penalty scored); Niskanen (penalty missed); Tomás (penalty scored); Adjei-Boateng (penalty scored)	4–3	(penalty scored) De Marco; (penalty scored) Ožbolt; (penalty scored) De Kamps; (penalty missed) Ratão; (penalty missed) Nono

Savon Sanomat Areena, Kuopio
Attendance: 0
Referee: Volen Chinkov (Bulgaria)

17 September 2020
20:45 (19:45 UTC+1)

Linfield (Northern Ireland)	0–1	(Malta) Floriana
	Report	García 10'

Windsor Park, Belfast
Attendance: 0
Referee: David Munro (Scotland)

17 September 2020 (Note: The Riga v Tre Fiori match, which kicked off on 17 September 2020, 19:00 (20:00 UTC+3), was suspended after 23 minutes due to strong winds and broken floodlights, then resumed on 18 September 2020, 09:00 (10:00 UTC+3).)
19:00 (20:00 UTC+3)

Riga (Latvia)	1–0	(San Marino) Tre Fiori
Pedrinho 57'	Report

Skonto Stadium, Riga
Attendance: 0
Referee: Kári Jóannesarson Á Høvdanum (Faroe Islands)

17 September 2020
19:00

Djurgårdens IF (Sweden)	2–1	(Gibraltar) Europa
Edwards 42'; Ulvestad 69' (pen.)	Report	Gallardo 57'

Tele2 Arena, Stockholm
Attendance: 0
Referee: Stéphanie Frappart (France)

17 September 2020
18:30 (19:30 UTC+3)

Flora (Estonia)	2–1	(Iceland) KR
Sappinen 7'; Lilander 37'	Report	Finnbogason 75'

A. Le Coq Arena, Tallinn
Attendance: 0
Referee: Sigurd Kringstad (Norway)

17 September 2020
20:00

Sileks (North Macedonia)	0–2	(Kosovo) Drita
	Report	Gërbeshi 49' (pen.); Limani 81'

Toše Proeski Arena, Skopje (Note: Sileks played their home match at Toše Proeski Arena, Skopje, instead of their regular stadium Gradski stadion, Kratovo.)
Attendance: 0
Referee: Andrew Madley (England)

17 September 2020
16:00 (20:00 UTC+6)

Astana (Kazakhstan)	0–1	(Montenegro) Budućnost Podgorica
	Report	Terzić 25'

Almaty Central Stadium, Almaty (Note: Astana played their home match at Almaty Central Stadium, Almaty, instead of their regular stadium Astana Arena, Nur-Sultan.)
Attendance: 0
Referee: Dumitri Muntean (Moldova)

17 September 2020
16:00 (18:00 UTC+4)

Ararat-Armenia	4–3 (a.e.t.)	(Luxembourg) Fola Esch
Martínez 16'; Lima 90+1' (pen.), 90+4' (pen.); Vakulenko 113'	Report	Pimentel 19'; Bensi 56'; Hadji 81'

Vazgen Sargsyan Republican Stadium, Yerevan (Note: Ararat-Armenia played their home matches at Vazgen Sargsyan Republican Stadium, Yerevan, instead of their regular stadium Yerevan Football Academy Stadium, Yerevan.)
Attendance: 0
Referee: Enea Jorgji (Albania)

17 September 2020
20:00 (19:00 UTC+1)

Connah's Quay Nomads (Wales)	0–1	(Georgia (country)) Dinamo Tbilisi
	Report	Gabedava 90+7' (pen.)

Racecourse Ground, Wrexham
Attendance: 0
Referee: Alain Durieux (Luxembourg)

=== Main Path matches ===
16 September 2020
19:00

Hammarby IF (Sweden)	0–3	(Poland) Lech Poznań
	Report	Tiba 55'; Kamiński 89'; Marchwiński 90+3'

Tele2 Arena, Stockholm
Attendance: 0
Referee: Sascha Stegemann (Germany)

17 September 2020
14:00 (18:00 UTC+6)

Kaisar (Kazakhstan)	1–4	(Cyprus) APOEL
Lobjanidze 6'	Report	De Vincenti 15', 90+3'; Tuhami 25'; Atzili 48'

Kazhymukan Munaitpasov Stadium, Shymkent (Note: Kaisar played their home match at Kazhymukan Munaitpasov Stadium, Shymkent, instead of their regular stadium Gani Muratbayev Stadium, Kyzylorda.)
Attendance: 0
Referee: Jens Maae (Denmark)

17 September 2020
20:15

Mura (Slovenia)	3–0	(Denmark) AGF
Gorenc 37'; Žižek 72'; Maroša 90+5'	Report

Fazanerija City Stadium, Murska Sobota
Attendance: 0
Referee: Giorgi Kruashvili (Georgia)

17 September 2020
19:00 (20:00 UTC+3)

Maccabi Haifa (Israel)	2–1	(Kazakhstan) Kairat
Ashkenazi 31'; Rukavytsya 72'	Report	Vágner Love 45+1'

Sammy Ofer Stadium, Haifa
Attendance: 0
Referee: Mads-Kristoffer Kristoffersen (Denmark)

17 September 2020
19:00 (21:00 UTC+4)

Locomotive Tbilisi (Georgia (country))	2–1	(Russia) Dynamo Moscow
Sikharulidze 54'; Gavashelishvili 76'	Report	Komlichenko 90' (pen.)

Mikheil Meskhi Stadium pitch 2, Tbilisi
Attendance: 0
Referee: Karim Abed (France)

17 September 2020
18:00 (20:00 UTC+4)

Neftçi (Azerbaijan)	1–3	(Turkey) Galatasaray
Mbodj 46'	Report	Diagne 19', 63'; Luyindama 48'

Baku Olympic Stadium, Baku
Attendance: 0
Referee: Kevin Clancy (Scotland)

16 September 2020
20:00 (19:00 UTC+1)

B36 (Faroe Islands)	2–2 (a.e.t.)	(Wales) The New Saints
Przybylski 47'; Radosavljevic 120+2'	Report	Smith 81'; Ebbe 112'
Penalties
Nattestad (penalty scored); Mellemgaard (penalty scored); Heinesen (penalty scored); Przybylski (penalty missed); Radosavljevic (penalty scored); Pingel (penalty scored)	5–4	(penalty scored) Harrison; (penalty scored) Cieślewicz; (penalty scored) Draper; (penalty scored) Smith; (penalty missed) Ebbe; (penalty missed) Redmond

Tórsvøllur, Tórshavn
Attendance: 0
Referee: Vilhjálmur Þórarinsson (Iceland)

17 September 2020
20:30 (19:30 UTC+1)

Coleraine (Northern Ireland)	2–2 (a.e.t.)	(Scotland) Motherwell
Doherty 49' (pen.), 90' (pen.)	Report	Lang 16'; Watt 37'
Penalties
Parkhill (penalty missed); Kane (penalty missed); McConaghie (penalty missed)	0–3	(penalty scored) O'Hara; (penalty scored) Watt; (penalty scored) O'Donnell

The Showgrounds, Coleraine
Attendance: 0
Referee: Antti Munukka (Finland)

17 September 2020
18:00

IFK Göteborg (Sweden)	1–2	(Denmark) Copenhagen
Sana 73'	Report	Mudražija 83'; Wind 85'

Ullevi, Gothenburg
Attendance: 0
Referee: Guillermo Cuadra Fernández (Spain)

17 September 2020
21:00

TSC (Serbia)	6–6 (a.e.t.)	(Romania) FCSB
Milićević 11'; Duronjić 14'; Antonić 51'; Tomanović 90+4', 117'; Tumbasević 105+1'	Report	Coman 25'; Man 50', 63' (pen.), 105'; Balaž 90+3' (o.g.); Petre 108'
Penalties
Tomanović (penalty scored); Zec (penalty scored); Banjac (penalty missed); Antonić (penalty scored); Đurić (penalty scored)	4–5	(penalty scored) Moruțan; (penalty scored) Perianu; (penalty scored) Panțîru; (penalty scored) Petre; (penalty scored) Man

City Stadium, Senta (Note: TSC Bačka Topola played their home match at City Stadium, Senta, instead of their city stadium in Bačka Topola.)
Attendance: 0
Referee: Dennis Higler (Netherlands)

17 September 2020
16:00

Teuta (Albania)	0–4	(Spain) Granada
	Report	Soldado 5'; Kenedy 10'; Herrera 31', 46'

Niko Dovana Stadium, Durrës
Attendance: 0
Referee: Willy Delajod (France)

17 September 2020
19:00 (20:00 UTC+3)

OFI (Greece)	0–1	(Cyprus) Apollon Limassol
	Report	Szalai 50'

Theodoros Vardinogiannis Stadium, Heraklion
Attendance: 0
Referee: Fabio Maresca (Italy)

16 September 2020
18:30

Progrès Niederkorn (Luxembourg)	0–5	(Netherlands) Willem II
	Report	Pavlidis 20', 34'; Sağlam 28'; Nunnely 46'; Trésor 65'

Stade Municipal, Differdange
Attendance: 0
Referee: Mykola Balakin (Ukraine)

17 September 2020
20:30

Viking (Norway)	0–2	(Scotland) Aberdeen
	Report	McCrorie 45'; Hedges 78'

Viking Stadion, Stavanger
Attendance: 0
Referee: Filip Glova (Slovakia)

17 September 2020
20:00

Standard Liège (Belgium)	2–0	(Wales) Bala Town
Avenatti 19' (pen.); Amallah 34'	Report

Stade Maurice Dufrasne, Liège
Attendance: 0
Referee: Trustin Farrugia Cann (Malta)

17 September 2020
19:00 (20:00 UTC+3)

Sfîntul Gheorghe (Moldova)	0–1 (a.e.t.)	(Serbia) Partizan
	Report	Natkho 104' (pen.)

Zimbru Stadium, Chișinău (Note: Sfântul Gheorghe played their home match at Zimbru Stadium, Chișinău, instead of their regular stadium Suruceni Stadium, Suruceni.)
Attendance: 0
Referee: Juri Fischer (Estonia)

17 September 2020
19:00 (20:00 UTC+3)

CSKA Sofia (Bulgaria)	2–0	(Belarus) BATE Borisov
Sowe 44'; Carey 90+5'	Report

Bulgarian Army Stadium, Sofia
Attendance: 0
Referee: Horațiu Feșnic (Romania)

17 September 2020
17:45 (18:45 UTC+3)

Botoșani (Romania)	0–1	(North Macedonia) Shkëndija
	Report	Ibraimi 2'

Stadionul Municipal, Botoșani
Attendance: 0
Referee: Mohammed Al-Hakim (Sweden)

17 September 2020
18:00 (19:00 UTC+3)

Lokomotiv Plovdiv (Bulgaria)	1–2	(England) Tottenham Hotspur
Minchev 71'	Report	Kane 80' (pen.); Ndombele 85'

Lokomotiv Stadium, Plovdiv
Attendance: 0
Referee: Harm Osmers (Germany)

17 September 2020
19:00

Laçi (Albania)	1–2	(Israel) Hapoel Be'er Sheva
Nwabueze 59'	Report	Agudelo 90'; Varenne 90+3'

Elbasan Arena, Elbasan (Note: Laçi played their home match at Elbasan Arena, Elbasan, instead of their regular stadium Laçi Stadium, Laç.)
Attendance: 0
Referee: Jochem Kamphuis (Netherlands)

17 September 2020
20:00 (21:00 UTC+3)

Aris (Greece)	1–2	(Ukraine) Kolos Kovalivka
Gama 55'	Report	Novak 47'; Antyukh 62'

Kleanthis Vikelidis Stadium, Thessaloniki
Attendance: 0
Referee: Lionel Tschudi (Switzerland)

17 September 2020
21:05

Honvéd (Hungary)	0–2	(Sweden) Malmö FF
	Report	Toivonen 43'; Traustason 86'

Hidegkuti Nándor Stadion, Budapest
Attendance: 0
Referee: Anastasios Papapetrou (Greece)

17 September 2020
14:15 (15:15 UTC+3)

Ventspils (Latvia)	1–5	(Norway) Rosenborg
Kozlov 5'	Report	Islamović 15' (pen.), 45+3'; A. Konradsen 37'; Holse 64'; Zachariassen 71'

Ventspils Olimpiskais Stadions, Ventspils
Attendance: 0
Referee: Paul McLaughlin (Republic of Ireland)

17 September 2020
18:00 (19:00 UTC+3)

Riteriai (Lithuania)	1–5	(Czech Republic) Slovan Liberec
Lezama 61'	Report	Mara 12' (pen.); Hromada 20'; Rabušic 84'; Helal 89' (pen.); Matoušek 90+5'

LFF Stadium, Vilnius
Attendance: 0
Referee: Espen Eskås (Norway)

17 September 2020
17:00

Lincoln Red Imps (Gibraltar)	0–5	(Scotland) Rangers
	Report	Tavernier 21'; Goldson 45+4'; Morelos 67', 88'; Defoe 84'

Victoria Stadium, Gibraltar
Attendance: 0
Referee: Iwan Arwel Griffith (Wales)

17 September 2020
20:45

Servette (Switzerland)	0–1	(France) Reims
	Report	Berisha 4'

Stade de Genève, Geneva
Attendance: 0
Referee: Stuart Attwell (England)

17 September 2020
20:00

Borac Banja Luka (Bosnia and Herzegovina)	0–2	(Portugal) Rio Ave
	Report	Tarantini 90'; Jambor 90+6'

City Stadium, Banja Luka
Attendance: 0
Referee: Peter Kjærsgaard-Andersen (Denmark)

17 September 2020
15:30

Renova (North Macedonia)	0–1	(Croatia) Hajduk Split
	Report	Caktaš 4'

Petar Miloševski Training Centre, Skopje (Note: Renova played their home match at Petar Miloševski Training Centre, Skopje, instead of their regular stadium Ecolog Arena, Tetovo.)
Attendance: 0
Referee: João Pinheiro (Portugal)

17 September 2020
18:30

Olimpija Ljubljana (Slovenia)	2–3 (a.e.t.)	(Bosnia and Herzegovina) Zrinjski Mostar
Ivanović 19'; Vombergar 81'	Report	Bilbija 51', 84'; Ivančić 92'

Stožice Stadium, Ljubljana
Attendance: 0
Referee: Ricardo de Burgos Bengoetxea (Spain)

17 September 2020
20:00

Kukësi (Albania)	0–4	(Germany) VfL Wolfsburg
	Report	Weghorst 21', 74'; Lacroix 33'; Mehmedi 89'

Arena Kombëtare, Tirana
Attendance: 0
Referee: Duje Strukan (Croatia)

17 September 2020
20:45

DAC Dunajská Streda (Slovakia)	5–3 (a.e.t.)	(Czech Republic) Jablonec
Divković 6', 65'; Nicolaescu 85', 96'; Davis 114'	Report	Zelený 25'; Schranz 57', 71' (pen.)

MOL Aréna, Dunajská Streda
Attendance: 0
Referee: Marco Di Bello (Italy)

17 September 2020
20:00

Piast Gliwice (Poland)	3–2	(Austria) Hartberg
Konczkowski 10'; Sokołowski 62'; Żyro 84'	Report	Kainz 33'; Ried 75'

Stadion Piast, Gliwice
Attendance: 0
Referee: Erik Lambrechts (Belgium)

17 September 2020
20:45

Osijek (Croatia)	1–2	(Switzerland) Basel
Majstorović 84'	Report	Cabral 18'; Stocker 44'

Stadion Gradski vrt, Osijek
Attendance: 0
Referee: José Luis Munuera Montero (Spain)

17 September 2020
20:00 (19:00 UTC+1)

Shamrock Rovers (Republic of Ireland)	0–2	(Italy) Milan
	Report	Ibrahimović 23'; Çalhanoğlu 67'

Tallaght Stadium, Tallaght
Attendance: 0
Referee: Ádám Farkas (Hungary)

17 September 2020
19:00

Hibernians (Malta)	0–1	(Hungary) MOL Fehérvár
	Report	Nikolov 61'

Centenary Stadium, Ta' Qali
Attendance: 0
Referee: Ivaylo Stoyanov (Bulgaria)

17 September 2020
18:00

Bodø/Glimt (Norway)	3–1	(Lithuania) Žalgiris
Zinckernagel 20'; Boniface 32'; Berg 81'	Report	Antal 26'

Aspmyra Stadion, Bodø
Attendance: 0
Referee: Peter Kralović (Slovakia)

== Third qualifying round ==
The draw for the third qualifying round was held on 1 September 2020, 13:00 CEST.

=== Seeding ===
A total of 70 teams played in the third qualifying round. They were divided into two paths:

- Champions Path (18 teams): 8 of the 10 losers of the 2020–21 UEFA Champions League second qualifying round (Champions Path), and 10 winners of the second qualifying round (Champions Path).
- Main Path (52 teams): 13 teams which entered in this round, 3 losers of the 2020–21 UEFA Champions League second qualifying round (League Path), and 36 winners of the second qualifying round (Main Path).

Seeding of teams in the Champions Path was based on the round they are eliminated from the Champions League. Seeding of teams in the Main Path was based on their 2020 UEFA club coefficients. For the winners of the second qualifying round (Main Path), whose identity was not known at the time of draw, the club coefficient of the highest-ranked remaining team in each tie was used. The first team drawn in each tie would be the home team. Teams from the same association could not be drawn against each other. Numbers were pre-assigned for each team by UEFA, with the draw held in two runs, one for Groups 1–6 with six teams and one for Groups 7–8 with eight teams.

Champions Path
Group 1		Group 2		Group 3	
Seeded	Unseeded	Seeded	Unseeded	Seeded	Unseeded
(Moldova) Sheriff Tiraspol; (Bosnia and Herzegovina) Sarajevo; (Slovenia) Celje	(Montenegro) Budućnost Podgorica; (Republic of Ireland) Dundalk; Ararat-Armenia	(Scotland) Celtic; (Poland) Legia Warsaw; (Lithuania) Sūduva	(Finland) KuPS; (Latvia) Riga; (Kosovo) Drita	(Romania) CFR Cluj; (Faroe Islands) KÍ	(Georgia (country)) Dinamo Tbilisi; (Sweden) Djurgårdens IF; (Malta) Floriana; (Estonia) Flora

Notes

1. ^{†} Losers of the Champions League second qualifying round (Champions Path).
2. ^{‡} Winners of the second qualifying round (Champions Path), whose identity was not known at the time of draw.

Main Path
Group 1		Group 2		Group 3		Group 4	
Seeded	Unseeded	Seeded	Unseeded	Seeded	Unseeded	Seeded	Unseeded
(Portugal) Sporting CP (2); (Netherlands) PSV Eindhoven (3); (Sweden) Malmö FF (1)	(Scotland) Aberdeen (5); (Slovenia) Mura (4); (Croatia) Lokomotiva Zagreb (6)	(Germany) VfL Wolfsburg (2); (Serbia) Partizan (3); (Norway) Rosenborg (1)	(Belgium) Charleroi (4); (Ukraine) Desna Chernihiv (5); (Turkey) Alanyaspor (6)	(Spain) Granada (1); (France) Reims (3); (Croatia) Rijeka (2)	(Hungary) MOL Fehérvár (4); (Georgia (country)) Locomotive Tbilisi (6); (Ukraine) Kolos Kovalivka (5)	(Italy) Milan (2); (Greece) AEK Athens (3); (Austria) LASK (1)	(Slovakia) DAC Dunajská Streda (6); (Norway) Bodø/Glimt (5); (Switzerland) St. Gallen (4)
Group 5		Group 6		Group 7		Group 8	
Seeded	Unseeded	Seeded	Unseeded	Seeded	Unseeded	Seeded	Unseeded
(England) Tottenham Hotspur (3); (Belgium) Standard Liège (1); (Russia) Rostov (2)	(North Macedonia) Shkëndija (4); (Israel) Maccabi Haifa (5); (Serbia) Vojvodina (6)	(Turkey) Beşiktaş (2); (Scotland) Rangers (3); (Cyprus) Apollon Limassol (1)	(Portugal) Rio Ave (5); (Netherlands) Willem II (4); (Poland) Lech Poznań (6)	(Switzerland) Basel (2); (Denmark) Copenhagen (4); (Romania) FCSB (1); (Israel) Hapoel Be'er Sheva (3)	(Czech Republic) Slovan Liberec (7); (Poland) Piast Gliwice (8); (Scotland) Motherwell (5); (Cyprus) Anorthosis Famagusta (6)	(Czech Republic) Viktoria Plzeň (3); (Cyprus) APOEL (4); (Bulgaria) CSKA Sofia (2); (Turkey) Galatasaray (1)	(Croatia) Hajduk Split (7); (Faroe Islands) B36 (6); (Bosnia and Herzegovina) Zrinjski Mostar (8); (Denmark) SønderjyskE (5)

Notes

1. ^{†} Winners of the second qualifying round (Main Path), whose identity was not known at the time of draw. Teams in italics defeated a team with a higher coefficient, thus effectively taking the coefficient of their opponent in the draw.
2. ^{‡} Losers of the Champions League second qualifying round (League Path).

=== Summary ===
The matches were played on 23 and 24 September 2020.

Third qualifying round
Home team	Score	Away team
Champions Path
Tirana (Albania)	Bye	N/A
Ludogorets Razgrad (Bulgaria)	Bye	N/A
Sarajevo (Bosnia and Herzegovina)	2–1	(Montenegro) Budućnost Podgorica
Sheriff Tiraspol (Moldova)	1–1 (a.e.t.) (3–5 p)	(Republic of Ireland) Dundalk
Ararat-Armenia	1–0 (a.e.t.)	(Slovenia) Celje
Riga (Latvia)	0–1	(Scotland) Celtic
KuPS (Finland)	2–0	(Lithuania) Sūduva
Legia Warsaw (Poland)	2–0	(Kosovo) Drita
KÍ (Faroe Islands)	6–1	(Georgia (country)) Dinamo Tbilisi
Djurgårdens IF (Sweden)	0–1	(Romania) CFR Cluj
Floriana (Malta)	0–0 (a.e.t.) (2–4 p)	(Estonia) Flora
Main Path
Mura (Slovenia)	1–5	(Netherlands) PSV Eindhoven
Malmö FF (Sweden)	5–0	(Croatia) Lokomotiva Zagreb
Sporting CP (Portugal)	1–0	(Scotland) Aberdeen
Charleroi (Belgium)	2–1 (a.e.t.)	(Serbia) Partizan
Rosenborg (Norway)	1–0	(Turkey) Alanyaspor
VfL Wolfsburg (Germany)	2–0	(Ukraine) Desna Chernihiv
MOL Fehérvár (Hungary)	0–0 (a.e.t.) (4–1 p)	(France) Reims
Granada (Spain)	2–0	(Georgia (country)) Locomotive Tbilisi
Rijeka (Croatia)	2–0 (a.e.t.)	(Ukraine) Kolos Kovalivka
St. Gallen (Switzerland)	0–1	(Greece) AEK Athens
LASK (Austria)	7–0	(Slovakia) DAC Dunajská Streda
Milan (Italy)	3–2	(Norway) Bodø/Glimt
Shkëndija (North Macedonia)	1–3	(England) Tottenham Hotspur
Standard Liège (Belgium)	2–1 (a.e.t.)	(Serbia) Vojvodina
Rostov (Russia)	1–2	(Israel) Maccabi Haifa
Willem II (Netherlands)	0–4	(Scotland) Rangers
Apollon Limassol (Cyprus)	0–5	(Poland) Lech Poznań
Beşiktaş (Turkey)	1–1 (a.e.t.) (2–4 p)	(Portugal) Rio Ave
FCSB (Romania)	0–2	(Czech Republic) Slovan Liberec
Hapoel Be'er Sheva (Israel)	3–0	(Scotland) Motherwell
Copenhagen (Denmark)	3–0	(Poland) Piast Gliwice
Basel (Switzerland)	3–2	(Cyprus) Anorthosis Famagusta
Galatasaray (Turkey)	2–0	(Croatia) Hajduk Split
Viktoria Plzeň (Czech Republic)	3–0	(Denmark) SønderjyskE
APOEL (Cyprus)	2–2 (a.e.t.) (4–2 p)	(Bosnia and Herzegovina) Zrinjski Mostar
CSKA Sofia (Bulgaria)	3–1	(Faroe Islands) B36

=== Champions Path matches ===
24 September 2020
20:00

Sarajevo (Bosnia and Herzegovina)	2–1	(Montenegro) Budućnost Podgorica
Tatar 4'; Fanimo 67'	Report	Moraitis 44'

Bilino Polje Stadium, Zenica (Note: Sarajevo played their home matches at Bilino Polje Stadium, Zenica, instead of their regular stadium Koševo City Stadium, Sarajevo.)
Attendance: 0
Referee: José María Sánchez (Spain)

24 September 2020
20:00 (21:00 UTC+3)

Sheriff Tiraspol (Moldova)	1–1 (a.e.t.)	(Republic of Ireland) Dundalk
Posmac 8'	Report	Murray 45'
Penalties
Kapić (penalty scored); Obilor (penalty missed); Veloso (penalty scored); Parra (penalty scored)	3–5	(penalty scored) Čolović; (penalty scored) Hoban; (penalty scored) Hoare; (penalty scored) McEleney; (penalty scored) Shields

Sheriff Stadium, Tiraspol
Attendance: 0
Referee: Aleksandar Stavrev (North Macedonia)

24 September 2020
16:00 (18:00 UTC+4)

Ararat-Armenia	1–0 (a.e.t.)	(Slovenia) Celje
Vakulenko 111'	Report

Yerevan Football Academy Stadium, Yerevan
Attendance: 0
Referee: John Beaton (Scotland)

24 September 2020
19:00 (20:00 UTC+3)

Riga (Latvia)	0–1	(Scotland) Celtic
	Report	Elyounoussi 90'

Skonto Stadium, Riga
Attendance: 0
Referee: Fábio Veríssimo (Portugal)

24 September 2020
17:30 (18:30 UTC+3)

KuPS (Finland)	2–0	(Lithuania) Sūduva
Rangel 31'; Tarasovs 72'	Report

Kuopio Football Stadium, Kuopio
Attendance: 0
Referee: Manuel Schüttengruber (Austria)

24 September 2020
20:30

Legia Warsaw (Poland)	2–0	(Kosovo) Drita
Wszołek 24'; Pekhart 43'	Report

Polish Army Stadium, Warsaw
Attendance: 0
Referee: Halis Özkahya (Turkey)

24 September 2020
20:00 (19:00 UTC+1)

KÍ (Faroe Islands)	6–1	(Georgia (country)) Dinamo Tbilisi
Pavlović 22'; P. Johannesen 58'; Klettskarð 60', 69', 73'; J. Johannesen 85'	Report	Pernambuco 71'

Tórsvøllur, Tórshavn (Note: KÍ played their home match at Tórsvøllur, Tórshavn, instead of their regular stadium Við Djúpumýrar, Klaksvík which did not meet UEFA requirements.)
Attendance: 0
Referee: Thorvaldur Árnason (Iceland)

24 September 2020
19:00

Djurgårdens IF (Sweden)	0–1	(Romania) CFR Cluj
	Report	Vinícius 55'

Tele2 Arena, Stockholm
Attendance: 0
Referee: Bartosz Frankowski (Poland)

24 September 2020
19:00

Floriana (Malta)	0–0 (a.e.t.)	(Estonia) Flora
	Report
Penalties
Keqi (penalty missed); Venancio (penalty missed); Adan (penalty scored); Busuttil (penalty scored)	2–4	(penalty scored) Lilander; (penalty scored) Kreida; (penalty missed) Poom; (penalty scored) Kuusk; (penalty scored) Liivak

National Stadium, Ta' Qali
Attendance: 0
Referee: Irfan Peljto (Bosnia and Herzegovina)

=== Main Path matches ===
24 September 2020
19:00

Mura (Slovenia)	1–5	(Netherlands) PSV Eindhoven
Kouter 21'	Report	Malen 17', 65'; Mauro Júnior 28'; Gakpo 54', 90'

Fazanerija City Stadium, Murska Sobota
Attendance: 0
Referee: Sandro Schärer (Switzerland)

24 September 2020
19:00

Malmö FF (Sweden)	5–0	(Croatia) Lokomotiva Zagreb
Kiese Thelin 5', 17'; Nalić 31'; Larsson 52'; Rieks 72'	Report

Eleda Stadion, Malmö
Attendance: 0
Referee: François Letexier (France)

24 September 2020
21:00 (20:00 UTC+1)

Sporting CP (Portugal)	1–0	(Scotland) Aberdeen
Tomás 8'	Report

Estádio José Alvalade, Lisbon
Attendance: 0
Referee: Nikola Dabanović (Montenegro)

24 September 2020
19:00

Charleroi (Belgium)	2–1 (a.e.t.)	(Serbia) Partizan
Dessoleil 11'; Rezaei 107'	Report	Soumah 53'

Stade du Pays de Charleroi, Charleroi
Attendance: 0
Referee: Bobby Madden (Scotland)

24 September 2020
19:00

Rosenborg (Norway)	1–0	(Turkey) Alanyaspor
Konradsen 59'	Report

Lerkendal Stadion, Trondheim
Attendance: 0
Referee: Kristo Tohver (Estonia)

24 September 2020
20:15

VfL Wolfsburg (Germany)	2–0	(Ukraine) Desna Chernihiv
Guilavogui 16'; Ginczek 90+2'	Report

AOK Stadion, Wolfsburg (Note: VfL Wolfsburg played their home match at AOK Stadion, instead of their regular stadium Volkswagen Arena, as a cost-saving measure.)
Attendance: 0
Referee: Lawrence Visser (Belgium)

24 September 2020
18:00

MOL Fehérvár (Hungary)	0–0 (a.e.t.)	(France) Reims
	Report
Penalties
Evandro (penalty scored); Stopira (penalty scored); Hodžić (penalty scored); Négo (penalty scored)	4–1	(penalty missed) Dia; (penalty missed) Abdelhamid; (penalty scored) Konan

MOL Aréna Sóstó, Székesfehérvár
Attendance: 0
Referee: Matej Jug (Slovenia)

24 September 2020
20:00

Granada (Spain)	2–0	(Georgia (country)) Locomotive Tbilisi
Machís 48'; Molina 90+1'	Report

Nuevo Los Cármenes, Granada
Attendance: 0
Referee: Serdar Gözübüyük (Netherlands)

24 September 2020
20:45

Rijeka (Croatia)	2–0 (a.e.t.)	(Ukraine) Kolos Kovalivka
Escoval 102'; Andrijašević 115'	Report

Stadion Rujevica, Rijeka
Attendance: 0
Referee: Tiago Martins (Portugal)

24 September 2020
20:30

St. Gallen (Switzerland)	0–1	(Greece) AEK Athens
	Report	Oliveira 78'

Kybunpark, St. Gallen
Attendance: 0
Referee: Alejandro Hernández (Spain)

24 September 2020
20:30

LASK (Austria)	7–0	(Slovakia) DAC Dunajská Streda
Raguž 6', 16'; Filipović 47'; Michorl 51'; Gruber 53'; Balić 55'; Sabitzer 77'	Report

Linzer Stadion, Linz
Attendance: 0
Referee: Jérôme Brisard (France)

24 September 2020
20:30

Milan (Italy)	3–2	(Norway) Bodø/Glimt
Çalhanoğlu 16', 50'; Colombo 32'	Report	Junker 15'; Hauge 55'

San Siro, Milan
Attendance: 0
Referee: Fran Jović (Croatia)

24 September 2020
20:00

Shkëndija (North Macedonia)	1–3	(England) Tottenham Hotspur
Nafiu 55'	Report	Lamela 5'; Son Heung-min 70'; Kane 79'

Toše Proeski Arena, Skopje (Note: Shkëndija played their home match at Toše Proeski Arena, Skopje, instead of their regular stadium Ecolog Arena, Tetovo.)
Attendance: 0
Referee: Ali Palabıyık (Turkey)

24 September 2020
20:00

Standard Liège (Belgium)	2–1 (a.e.t.)	(Serbia) Vojvodina
Avenatti 47' (pen.); Amallah 91'	Report	Bojić 75'

Stade Maurice Dufrasne, Liège
Attendance: 0
Referee: Harald Lechner (Austria)

24 September 2020
18:30 (19:30 UTC+3)

Rostov (Russia)	1–2	(Israel) Maccabi Haifa
Shomurodov 9'	Report	Rukavytsya 20'; Abu Fani 60'

Rostov Arena, Rostov-on-Don
Attendance: 0
Referee: Petr Ardeleánu (Czech Republic)

24 September 2020
21:00

Willem II (Netherlands)	0–4	(Scotland) Rangers
	Report	Tavernier 22' (pen.); Kent 25'; Helander 55'; Goldson 71'

Koning Willem II Stadion, Tilburg
Attendance: 0
Referee: Maurizio Mariani (Italy)

23 September 2020
18:00 (19:00 UTC+3)

Apollon Limassol (Cyprus)	0–5	(Poland) Lech Poznań
	Report	Tiba 42', 90+1'; Ishak 47'; Kamiński 58'; Sýkora 81'

GSP Stadium, Nicosia
Attendance: 0
Referee: Mattias Gestranius (Finland)

24 September 2020
19:00 (20:00 UTC+3)

Beşiktaş (Turkey)	1–1 (a.e.t.)	(Portugal) Rio Ave
Yalçın 15'	Report	Moreira 85'
Penalties
Mensah (penalty scored); Töre (penalty scored); Welinton (penalty missed); Larin (penalty missed)	2–4	(penalty scored) Moreira; (penalty scored) Santos; (penalty scored) Jambor; (penalty scored) Reis

Vodafone Park, Istanbul
Attendance: 0
Referee: Daniel Siebert (Germany)

24 September 2020
19:30 (20:30 UTC+3)

FCSB (Romania)	0–2	(Czech Republic) Slovan Liberec
	Report	Abdulla 64'; Rabušic 82'

Marin Anastasovici Stadium, Giurgiu (Note: FCSB played their home match at Marin Anastasovici Stadium, Giurgiu, instead of their regular stadium Arena Națională, Bucharest.)
Attendance: 0
Referee: Aliyar Aghayev (Azerbaijan)

24 September 2020
19:30 (20:30 UTC+3)

Hapoel Be'er Sheva (Israel)	3–0	(Scotland) Motherwell
Vítor 43'; Josué 71' (pen.); Acolatse 83'	Report

HaMoshava Stadium, Petah Tikva
Attendance: 0
Referee: Serhiy Boyko (Ukraine)

24 September 2020
20:00

Copenhagen (Denmark)	3–0	(Poland) Piast Gliwice
Wilczek 14'; Wind 58'; Biel 90+5'	Report

Parken Stadium, Copenhagen
Attendance: 0
Referee: Roi Reinshreiber (Israel)

24 September 2020
20:30

Basel (Switzerland)	3–2	(Cyprus) Anorthosis Famagusta
Widmer 4'; Campo 12'; Hambardzumyan 21' (o.g.)	Report	Vrgoč 45'; Kvilitaia 67' (pen.)

St. Jakob-Park, Basel
Attendance: 0
Referee: Radu Petrescu (Romania)

24 September 2020
20:00 (21:00 UTC+3)

Galatasaray (Turkey)	2–0	(Croatia) Hajduk Split
Belhanda 77'; Babel 86'	Report

Türk Telekom Stadium, Istanbul
Attendance: 0
Referee: Craig Pawson (England)

24 September 2020
18:00

Viktoria Plzeň (Czech Republic)	3–0	(Denmark) SønderjyskE
Ondrášek 35' (pen.); Ba Loua 41'; Káčer 51'	Report

Doosan Arena, Plzeň
Attendance: 0
Referee: Donatas Rumšas (Lithuania)

24 September 2020
20:00 (21:00 UTC+3)

APOEL (Cyprus)	2–2 (a.e.t.)	(Bosnia and Herzegovina) Zrinjski Mostar
Atzili 14'; Nuhiu 26'	Report	Ivančić 11'; Bilbija 69'
Penalties
Jensen (penalty scored); Atzili (penalty missed); Sahar (penalty scored); Al-Taamari (penalty scored); De Vincenti (penalty scored)	4–2	(penalty scored) Filipović; (penalty missed) Ibáñez; (penalty missed) Bilbija; (penalty scored) Govedarica

GSP Stadium, Nicosia
Attendance: 0
Referee: Daniel Stefański (Poland)

24 September 2020
19:00 (20:00 UTC+3)

CSKA Sofia (Bulgaria)	3–1	(Faroe Islands) B36
Sowe 27'; Yomov 38'; Keita 83'	Report	Pingel 61'

Bulgarian Army Stadium, Sofia
Attendance: 0
Referee: Tamás Bognár (Hungary)

== Play-off round ==
The draw for the play-off round was held on 18 September 2020, 14:00 CEST.

=== Seeding ===
A total of 42 teams played in the play-off round. They were divided into two paths:

- Champions Path (16 teams): 2 of the 10 losers of the 2020–21 UEFA Champions League second qualifying round (Champions Path), 5 losers of the 2020–21 UEFA Champions League third qualifying round (Champions Path), and 9 winners of the third qualifying round (Champions Path).
- Main Path (26 teams): 26 winners of the third qualifying round (Main Path).

Seeding of teams in the Champions Path was based on the round they are eliminated from the Champions League. Seeding of teams in the Main Path was based on their 2020 UEFA club coefficients. For the winners of the third qualifying round (Main Path), whose identity was not known at the time of draw, the club coefficient of the highest-ranked remaining team in each tie was used. The first team drawn in each tie would be the home team. Teams from the same association could not be drawn against each other. Numbers were pre-assigned for each team by UEFA, with the draw held in two runs, one for Groups 1–3 with six teams and one for Group 4 with eight teams.

Champions Path
Group 1		Group 2		Group 3	
Seeded	Unseeded	Seeded	Unseeded	Seeded	Unseeded
(Croatia) Dinamo Zagreb; (Switzerland) Young Boys	(Romania) CFR Cluj; (Finland) KuPS; (Estonia) Flora; (Albania) Tirana	(Serbia) Red Star Belgrade; (Belarus) Dynamo Brest	(Scotland) Celtic; (Bulgaria) Ludogorets Razgrad; (Bosnia and Herzegovina) Sarajevo; Ararat-Armenia	(Azerbaijan) Qarabağ	(Poland) Legia Warsaw; (Republic of Ireland) Dundalk; (Faroe Islands) KÍ

Notes

1. ^{†} Losers of the Champions League third qualifying round (Champions Path).
2. ^{‡} Winners of the third qualifying round (Champions Path), whose identity was not known at the time of draw.
3. ^{Bye} Losers of the Champions League second qualifying round (Champions Path) which received a bye to the Europa League play-off round.

Main Path
Group 1		Group 2		Group 3		Group 4	
Seeded	Unseeded	Seeded	Unseeded	Seeded	Unseeded	Seeded	Unseeded
(Switzerland) Basel (1); (Portugal) Rio Ave (3); (Czech Republic) Viktoria Plzeň (2)	(Italy) Milan (5); (Israel) Hapoel Be'er Sheva (6); (Bulgaria) CSKA Sofia (4)	(Portugal) Sporting CP (1); (Denmark) Copenhagen (3); (Netherlands) PSV Eindhoven (2)	(Austria) LASK (4); (Norway) Rosenborg (6); (Croatia) Rijeka (5)	(Germany) VfL Wolfsburg (2); (Sweden) Malmö FF (3); (Belgium) Charleroi (1)	(Spain) Granada (5); (Greece) AEK Athens (6); (Poland) Lech Poznań (4)	(England) Tottenham Hotspur (2); (Cyprus) APOEL (4); (Turkey) Galatasaray (1); (Belgium) Standard Liège (3)	(Czech Republic) Slovan Liberec (8); (Scotland) Rangers (6); (Israel) Maccabi Haifa (5); (Hungary) MOL Fehérvár (7)

Notes

1. ^{†} Winners of the third qualifying round (Main Path), whose identity was not known at the time of draw. Teams in italics defeated a team with a higher coefficient, thus effectively taking the coefficient of their opponent in the draw.

=== Summary ===
The matches were played on 1 October 2020.

Play-off round
Home team	Score	Away team
Champions Path
Young Boys (Switzerland)	3–0	(Albania) Tirana
Dinamo Zagreb (Croatia)	3–1	(Estonia) Flora
CFR Cluj (Romania)	3–1	(Finland) KuPS
Ararat-Armenia	1–2	(Serbia) Red Star Belgrade
Dynamo Brest (Belarus)	0–2	(Bulgaria) Ludogorets Razgrad
Sarajevo (Bosnia and Herzegovina)	0–1	(Scotland) Celtic
Legia Warsaw (Poland)	0–3	(Azerbaijan) Qarabağ
Dundalk (Republic of Ireland)	3–1	(Faroe Islands) KÍ
Main Path
Hapoel Be'er Sheva (Israel)	1–0	(Czech Republic) Viktoria Plzeň
Basel (Switzerland)	1–3	(Bulgaria) CSKA Sofia
Rio Ave (Portugal)	2–2 (a.e.t.) (8–9 p)	(Italy) Milan
Rosenborg (Norway)	0–2	(Netherlands) PSV Eindhoven
Sporting CP (Portugal)	1–4	(Austria) LASK
Copenhagen (Denmark)	0–1	(Croatia) Rijeka
AEK Athens (Greece)	2–1	(Germany) VfL Wolfsburg
Charleroi (Belgium)	1–2	(Poland) Lech Poznań
Malmö FF (Sweden)	1–3	(Spain) Granada
Tottenham Hotspur (England)	7–2	(Israel) Maccabi Haifa
Slovan Liberec (Czech Republic)	1–0	(Cyprus) APOEL
Standard Liège (Belgium)	3–1	(Hungary) MOL Fehérvár
Rangers (Scotland)	2–1	(Turkey) Galatasaray

=== Champions Path matches ===
1 October 2020
20:30

Young Boys (Switzerland)	3–0	(Albania) Tirana
Fassnacht 42'; Nsame 52', 64'	Report

Stadion Wankdorf, Bern
Attendance: 0
Referee: Sergei Karasev (Russia)

1 October 2020
19:00

Dinamo Zagreb (Croatia)	3–1	(Estonia) Flora
Gavranović 11'; Ademi 26', 87'	Report	Sinyavskiy 65'

Stadion Maksimir, Zagreb
Attendance: 0
Referee: Ali Palabıyık (Turkey)

1 October 2020
17:30 (18:30 UTC+3)

CFR Cluj (Romania)	3–1	(Finland) KuPS
Rondón 5', 56'; Debeljuh 42'	Report	Udo 90+1'

Stadionul Dr. Constantin Rădulescu, Cluj-Napoca
Attendance: 0
Referee: Ivan Bebek (Croatia)

1 October 2020
19:00 (20:00 UTC+3)

Ararat-Armenia	1–2	(Serbia) Red Star Belgrade
Lima 72'	Report	Katai 45'; Falcinelli 60'

GSP Stadium, Nicosia, Cyprus (Note: The Ararat-Armenia v Red Star Belgrade match, originally to be played at Vazgen Sargsyan Republican Stadium, Yerevan, was moved to GSP Stadium, Nicosia, Cyprus, due to the 2020 Nagorno-Karabakh conflict.)
Attendance: 0
Referee: Anastasios Sidiropoulos (Greece)

1 October 2020
20:00 (21:00 UTC+3)

Dynamo Brest (Belarus)	0–2	(Bulgaria) Ludogorets Razgrad
	Report	Manu 73'; Marín 79'

Dinamo Stadion, Minsk
Attendance: 0
Referee: Slavko Vinčić (Slovenia)

1 October 2020
20:00

Sarajevo (Bosnia and Herzegovina)	0–1	(Scotland) Celtic
	Report	Édouard 70'

Bilino Polje Stadium, Zenica
Attendance: 0
Referee: Benoît Bastien (France)

1 October 2020
20:00

Legia Warsaw (Poland)	0–3	(Azerbaijan) Qarabağ
	Report	Andrade 50'; Zoubir 62'; Ozobić 70'

Polish Army Stadium, Warsaw
Attendance: 0
Referee: Tobias Stieler (Germany)

1 October 2020
20:30 (19:30 UTC+1)

Dundalk (Republic of Ireland)	3–1	(Faroe Islands) KÍ
Murray 33'; Cleary 48'; Kelly 79'	Report	Midtskogen 66'

Aviva Stadium, Dublin (Note: Dundalk played their home match at Aviva Stadium, Dublin, instead of their regular stadium Oriel Park, Dundalk.)
Attendance: 0
Referee: Maurizio Mariani (Italy)

=== Main Path matches ===
1 October 2020
19:30 (20:30 UTC+3)

Hapoel Be'er Sheva (Israel)	1–0	(Czech Republic) Viktoria Plzeň
Josué 4' (pen.)	Report

HaMoshava Stadium, Petah Tikva
Attendance: 0
Referee: Srđan Jovanović (Serbia)

1 October 2020
20:30

Basel (Switzerland)	1–3	(Bulgaria) CSKA Sofia
Cabral 54' (pen.)	Report	Rodrigues 72', 88'; Ahmedov 90+7'

St. Jakob-Park, Basel
Attendance: 0
Referee: Ivan Kružliak (Slovakia)

1 October 2020
21:00 (20:00 UTC+1)

Rio Ave (Portugal)	2–2 (a.e.t.)	(Italy) Milan
Geraldes 72'; Gelson 91'	Report	Saelemaekers 51'; Çalhanoğlu 120+2' (pen.)
Penalties
Geraldes (penalty scored); Santos (penalty scored); Jambor (penalty scored); Piazon (penalty scored); Filipe Augusto (penalty scored); Gelson (penalty scored); Gabrielzinho (penalty scored); Monte (penalty missed); Pinto (penalty scored); Kieszek (penalty missed); Geraldes (penalty missed); Santos (penalty missed)	8–9	(penalty scored) Bennacer; (penalty scored) Kjær; (penalty scored) Hernandez; (penalty scored) Brahim; (penalty scored) Çalhanoğlu; (penalty scored) Calabria; (penalty scored) Tonali; (penalty missed) Colombo; (penalty scored) Leão; (penalty missed) G. Donnarumma; (penalty missed) Bennacer; (penalty scored) Kjær

Estádio dos Arcos, Vila do Conde
Attendance: 0
Referee: Jesús Gil Manzano (Spain)

1 October 2020
19:00

Rosenborg (Norway)	0–2	(Netherlands) PSV Eindhoven
	Report	Zahavi 22'; Gakpo 61'

Lerkendal Stadion, Trondheim
Attendance: 0
Referee: Davide Massa (Italy)

1 October 2020
21:00 (20:00 UTC+1)

Sporting CP (Portugal)	1–4	(Austria) LASK
Tomás 42'	Report	Trauner 14'; Raguž 58'; Michorl 65'; Gruber 69'

Estádio José Alvalade, Lisbon
Attendance: 0
Referee: Aleksei Kulbakov (Belarus)

1 October 2020
20:00

Copenhagen (Denmark)	0–1	(Croatia) Rijeka
	Report	Ankersen 20' (o.g.)

Parken Stadium, Copenhagen
Attendance: 0
Referee: Chris Kavanagh (England)

1 October 2020
20:45 (21:45 UTC+3)

AEK Athens (Greece)	2–1	(Germany) VfL Wolfsburg
Simões 64'; Ansarifard 90+4'	Report	Mehmedi 45+1'

Olympic Stadium, Athens
Attendance: 0
Referee: Artur Soares Dias (Portugal)

1 October 2020
19:00

Charleroi (Belgium)	1–2	(Poland) Lech Poznań
Fall 56'	Report	Ramírez 34'; Puchacz 41'

Stade du Pays de Charleroi, Charleroi
Attendance: 0
Referee: Felix Zwayer (Germany)

1 October 2020
19:00

Malmö FF (Sweden)	1–3	(Spain) Granada
Berget 45'	Report	Machís 30'; Puertas 58'; Herrera 85'

Eleda Stadion, Malmö
Attendance: 0
Referee: István Kovács (Romania)

1 October 2020
21:00 (20:00 UTC+1)

Tottenham Hotspur (England)	7–2	(Israel) Maccabi Haifa
Kane 2', 56' (pen.), 74'; Lucas 21'; Lo Celso 37', 40'; Alli 90+1' (pen.)	Report	Chery 17'; Rukavytsya 52' (pen.)

Tottenham Hotspur Stadium, London
Attendance: 0
Referee: Ruddy Buquet (France)

1 October 2020
19:00

Slovan Liberec (Czech Republic)	1–0	(Cyprus) APOEL
Mara 90+5' (pen.)	Report

Stadion u Nisy, Liberec
Attendance: 0
Referee: Andreas Ekberg (Sweden)

1 October 2020
20:00

Standard Liège (Belgium)	3–1	(Hungary) MOL Fehérvár
Gavory 51'; Amallah 77' (pen.), 85' (pen.)	Report	Nikolić 10'

Stade Maurice Dufrasne, Liège
Attendance: 0
Referee: Willie Collum (Scotland)

1 October 2020
20:45 (19:45 UTC+1)

Rangers (Scotland)	2–1	(Turkey) Galatasaray
Arfield 52'; Tavernier 59'	Report	Marcão 87'

Ibrox Stadium, Glasgow
Attendance: 0
Referee: Andris Treimanis (Latvia)
