= 2026 Strømsgodset Toppfotball season =

Strømsgodset
2026 season
- Chairman: Finn Egil Holm
- Head coach: Magne Hoseth
- Stadium: Marienlyst Stadion
- 1. divisjon: 1st
- 2026–27 Norwegian Cup: Third round
- Top goalscorer: League: Sebastian Pingel (20); All: Sebastian Pingel (20)
- Highest home attendance: 6064 (vs Haugesund)
- Lowest home attendance: 4120 (vs Sandnes Ulf)
- Average home league attendance: 4755
- Biggest win: Egersund 0–5 Strømsgodset; Strømsgodset 6-1 Raufoss; Strømsgodset 5-0 Haugesund
- Biggest defeat: Molde 4–1 Strømsgodset (cup); Haugesund 4–2 Strømsgodset (league)
| Home colours | Away colours |

The 2026 season was the 119th season in the history of Strømsgodset Toppfotball and its first season in the Norwegian First Division, the second level of football in the country since 2006 after relegation. In addition, the club participated in the 2026–27 Norwegian Cup. Strømsgodset won the league and was promoted to the 2027 Eliteserien.

== Transfers ==
=== In ===
| Pos. | Player | Transferred from | Fee | Date | Source |
|---|---|---|---|---|---|
| GK | (Faroe Islands) Mattias Lamhauge | (Denmark) Fredericia | Undisclosed | 10 January 2026 | |
| DF | (Denmark) Victor Dedes | (Denmark) Hillerød | Undisclosed | 17 January 2026 | |
| FW | (Denmark) Sebastian Pingel | (Denmark) Horsens | Undisclosed | 4 February 2026 | |
| MF | (Norway) Kent-Are Antonsen | (Norway) Tromsø | Free | 9 March 2026 | |

=== Out ===
| Pos. | Player | Transferred to | Fee | Date | Source |
|---|---|---|---|---|---|
| GK | (Norway) Per Kristian Bråtveit | (Scotland) Aberdeen | End of contract | 31 December 2025 | |
| GK | (Norway) Jasper Silva Torkildsen | (Norway) IK Start | Loan return | 31 December 2025 | |
| MF | (Iraq) Marko Farji | (Italy) Venezia | ~NOK 15 million | 8 January 2026 | |
| DF | (Norway) Fredrik Kristensen Dahl | (Norway) Molde | ~NOK 5 million | 10 January 2026 | |
| DF | (Norway) Sivert Westerlund | (Norway) Egersund | | 4 February 2026 | |
| FW | (Sierra Leone) Alie Conteh | (Finland) FC Inter Turku | Loan | 23 February 2026 | |

== Pre-season and friendlies ==
| 27 January 2026 Friendly | Polissya Zhytomyr (Ukraine) | 2–1 | (Norway) Strømsgodset |

| 13 February 2026 Friendly | Lillestrøm (Norway) | 4–4 | (Norway) Strømsgodset |

| 18 February 2026 Friendly | Odd (Norway) | 2–0 | (Norway) Strømsgodset |

| 28 February 2026 Friendly | Strømsgodset (Norway) | 0–3 | (Norway) KFUM Oslo |

| 7 March 2026 Friendly | Vålerenga (Norway) | 4–3 | (Norway) Strømsgodset | Oslo |
| | | | | Stadium: Intility Arena |

| 13 March 2026 Friendly | Strømsgodset (Norway) | 1–1 | (Norway) Mjøndalen |

| 20 March 2026 Friendly | Strømsgodset (Norway) | 3–1 | (Norway) Hønefoss |

| 27 March 2026 Friendly | Strømsgodset (Norway) | 2–2 | (Norway) Sandefjord |

== Competitions ==
=== Overall record ===
| Competition | First match | Last match | Starting round | Final position | Record | | | | | | | |
| Competition | First match | Last match | Starting round | Final position | Pld | W | D | L | GF | GA | GD | Win % |
|---|---|---|---|---|---|---|---|---|---|---|---|---|
| 2026 Norwegian First Division | 5 April 2026 | 8 November 2026 | Matchday 1 | 1 | 30 | 20 | 6 | 4 | 82 | 36 | +46 | 66.67 |
| 2026–27 Norwegian Football Cup | 23 August 2026 | 28 October 2026 | 1st Round | Third Round | 3 | 2 | 0 | 1 | 11 | 5 | +6 | 66.67 |
| Total | | | | | 33 | 22 | 6 | 5 | 93 | 41 | +52 | 66.67 |

Last updated: 17 November 2026
Source: Competitions

=== First Division ===
| Pos | Team | Pld | W | D | L | GF | GA | GD | Pts | Promotion, qualification or relegation |
|---|---|---|---|---|---|---|---|---|---|---|
| 1 | Strømsgodset (C, P) | 30 | 20 | 6 | 4 | 82 | 36 | +46 | 66 | Promotion to Eliteserien |
| 2 | Haugesund (P) | 30 | 21 | 2 | 7 | 86 | 51 | +35 | 65 | Promotion to Eliteserien |
| 3 | Kongsvinger | 30 | 18 | 5 | 7 | 84 | 50 | +34 | 59 | Qualification for the promotion play-offs third round |
| 4 | Stabæk | 30 | 18 | 4 | 8 | 70 | 38 | +32 | 58 | Qualification for the promotion play-offs second round |
| 5 | Odd | 30 | 14 | 7 | 9 | 60 | 48 | +12 | 49 | Qualification for the promotion play-offs first round |

Updated to match(es) played on 8 November 2026. Source: OBOS-ligaen (in Norwegian)
Rules for classification: 1) Points; 2) Goal difference; 3) Goals scored; 4) Head-to-head points; 5) Head-to-head goal difference; 6) Head-to-head goals scored.
(C) Champions; (P) Promoted

==== Results summary ====
| Overall | | | | | | | | Home | | | | | | Away | | | | | |
| Pld | W | D | L | GF | GA | GD | Pts | W | D | L | GF | GA | GD | W | D | L | GF | GA | GD |
|---|---|---|---|---|---|---|---|---|---|---|---|---|---|---|---|---|---|---|---|
| 30 | 20 | 6 | 4 | 82 | 36 | +46 | 66 | 12 | 2 | 1 | 44 | 14 | +30 | 8 | 4 | 3 | 38 | 22 | +16 |

Last updated: 17 November 2026.
Source: flashscore

==== Results by round ====
| Round | 1 | 2 | 3 | 4 | 5 | 6 | 7 | 8 | 9 | 10 | 11 | 12 | 13 | 14 | 15 | 16 | 17 | 18 | 19 | 20 | 21 | 22 | 23 | 24 | 25 | 26 | 27 | 28 | 29 | 30 |
|---|---|---|---|---|---|---|---|---|---|---|---|---|---|---|---|---|---|---|---|---|---|---|---|---|---|---|---|---|---|---|
| Ground | H | A | H | A | H | A | H | A | H | A | H | A | H | A | H | A | H | A | H | A | A | H | A | H | A | H | H | A | H | A |
| Result | W | L | W | D | W | W | W | D | W | W | W | D | D | L | D | W | L | W | W | W | D | W | W | W | W | W | W | L | W | W |
| Position | 7 | 10 | 6 | 8 | 7 | 4 | 2 | 2 | 1 | 1 | 1 | 1 | 1 | 3 | 4 | 4 | 4 | 4 | 4 | 4 | 4 | 3 | 3 | 3 | 3 | 2 | 1 | 2 | 2 | 1 |

Updated to match(es) played on 17 November 2026. Source: Norwegian Football Federation
A = Away; H = Home; W = Win; D = Draw; L = Loss

==== Matches ====
The fixtures schedule was released on 19 December 2025.

| 5 April 2026 1 | Strømsgodset | 2–1 | Stabæk | Drammen |
| 17:00 | Ardraa (yellow card) 45+1'; Sørmo (yellow card) 51'; Antonsen (yellow card) 66'; Vilsvik 67'; Valsvik (yellow card) 72'; Pingel 81' | Report | Hanstad 54'; Karsten Arman Ekorness (yellow card) 76' | Stadium: Marienlyst Stadion; Attendance: 5,309; Referee: (Norway) Jørgen Haugen |

| 11 April 2026 2 | Haugesund | 4–2 | Strømsgodset | Haugesund |
| 15:00 | Anders Bondhus 50'; Diarra 61' (pen.); Rasmus Møller (yellow card) 73'; Leite (yellow card) 76' (goal) 81'; Eirik Viland Andersen 90+3' | Report | Sørmo (yellow card) 60'; Melkersen 68'; Pingel 70' | Stadium: Haugesund Stadion; Attendance: 4,167; Referee: (Norway) Herman Holthe |

| 18 April 2026 3 | Strømsgodset | 3–0 | Sogndal | Drammen |
| 15:00 | Stengel 60' (pen.); Krasniqi (yellow card) 70'; Mehnert 75'; Pingel 90' | Report | Pippola (yellow card) 17'; Sander Granheim (yellow card) 51'; Sturgeon (yellow card) 60' | Stadium: Marienlyst Stadion; Attendance: 4,566; Referee: (Norway) Steinar Hauge |

| 26 April 2026 4 | Sandnes Ulf | 1–1 | Strømsgodset | Sandnes |
| 17:00 | Zifarlino Nsoni (yellow card) 80'; Pingel 90+3' (o.g.) | Report | Melkersen 62'; Krasniqi (yellow card) 74' | Stadium: Øster Hus Arena; Attendance: 1,572; Referee: (Norway) Ajdin Medić |

| 1 May 2026 5 | Strømsgodset | 3–0 | Strømmen | Drammen |
| 16:00 | Lamhauge (yellow card) 6'; Wikheim 15'; Pingel 64'; Mehnert 73' | Report | Lillo (yellow card) 34'; Simen Beck (yellow card) 65' | Stadium: Marienlyst Stadion; Attendance: 4,558; Referee: (Norway) Ali al Hatam |

| 10 May 2026 6 | Åsane | 0–3 | Strømsgodset | Bergen |
| 17:00 | Ole Kallevåg (yellow card) 42'; Jesper Eikrem (yellow card) 57'; Malte Fismen (yellow card) 61' | Report | Ardraa 79'; Melkersen 84'; Pingel 86' | Stadium: Åsane Arena; Attendance: 432; Referee: (Norway) Mohammad Hafezi |

| 16 May 2026 7 | Strømsgodset | 5–4 | Ranheim | Drammen |
| 17:00 | Vilsvik (yellow card) 34'; Pingel 63'; Stengel 69' (pen.) (yellow card) 70'; Ardraa 72' 74'; Mehnert 88' | Report | Johnsen 3' (pen.) 47'; Andreas Fossli 52'; Famara Camara (yellow card) 66'; Taaje 73' (o.g.); Tage Haukeberg (red card) 90+3' | Stadium: Marienlyst Stadion; Attendance: 4,878; Referee: (Norway) Harald Sletner |

| 20 May 2026 8 | Moss | 1–1 | Strømsgodset | Moss, Norway |
| 19:00 | Aga 12' | Report | Taaje (yellow card) 52'; Mehnert 68' | Stadium: Melløs Stadion; Attendance: 1,573; Referee: (Norway) Johan Grundt |

| 25 May 2026 9 | Strømsgodset | 1–0 | Bryne | Drammen |
| 18:00 | Stengel 58'; Mats Spiten (yellow card) 90+1'; Pingel (yellow card) 90+4' | Report | Scriven (yellow card) 15' | Stadium: Marienlyst Stadion; Attendance: 4,619; Referee: (Norway) Magnus Koløy |

| 31 May 2026 10 | Egersund | 0–5 | Strømsgodset | Egersund |
| 18:00 | | Report | Pingel 34' 40'; Stengel 77' 83'; Mats Spiten (yellow card) 86'; Ardraa 90+3' | Stadium: XL-BYGG Sørvest Arena; Attendance: 998; Referee: (Norway) Haakon Bue |

| 14 June 2026 11 | Strømsgodset | 6–1 | Raufoss | Drammen |
| 16:00 | Vilsvik 33'; Pingel 45+2' 68' 75'; Mehnert 73'; Victor Dedes 90+2' | Report | Rogulj 38' (pen.) (yellow card) 38' | Stadium: Marienlyst Stadion; Attendance: 4,518; Referee: (Norway) Jørgen Haugen |

| 21 June 2026 12 | Kongsvinger | 4–4 | Strømsgodset | Kongsvinger |
| 16:00 | Rasmus Opdal Christiansen 25'; Sande 45'; Langrekken 56'; Lars Victor Fors 61' | Report | Pingel 12' 27' 77'; Taaje 53' | Stadium: Gjemselund Stadion; Attendance: 3,855 |

| 27 June 2026 13 | Strømsgodset | 2–2 | Odd | Drammen |
| 18:00 | Mehnert 7'; Melkersen 89' | Report | Filip Rønningen Jørgensen 42'; Hardarson 87' | Stadium: Marienlyst Stadion; Referee: (Norway) Jan Morten Tennøy |

| 4 July 2026 14 | Hødd | 4–3 | Strømsgodset | Ulsteinvik |
| 16:00 | Manaf Rawufu 18'; Cameron Streete 24'; M. Mulac 42'; I. Skotheim 75' (pen.) | Report | Krasniqi 29'; Mats Spiten 36'; Victor Dedes 69' | Stadium: Nye Høddvoll |

| 25 July 2026 15 | Strømsgodset | 1–1 | Lyn | Drammen |
| 18:00 | Krasniqi (yellow card) 18'; Ardraa 63'; Stengel (yellow card) 86' | Report | Andreas Hellum 73' | Stadium: Marienlyst Stadion; Referee: (Norway) Steinar Hauge |

| 1 August 2026 16 | Bryne | 0–2 | Strømsgodset | Bryne |
| 17:00 | | Report | Victor Dedes (yellow card) 39' (goal) 59'; Pingel 77' | Stadium: Bryne Stadion; Referee: (Norway) Abdulhadi Al Fahad |

| 9 August 2026 17 | Strømsgodset | 0–2 | Egersund | Drammen |
| 17:00 | Antonsen (yellow card) 31'; Andreas Heredia-Randen (yellow card) 40' | Report | Ekeland 18'; Scott Vatne (yellow card) 26'; Nicolaj Tornvig 48' | Stadium: Marienlyst Stadion |

| 15 August 2026 18 | Ranheim | 1–3 | Strømsgodset | Trondheim |
| 16:00 | Jacob Storevik (yellow card) 17'; Maurice Sylva 70' | Report | Stengel 18' (pen.) 57'; Sørmo 84' | Stadium: EXTRA Arena |

| 26 August 2026 19 | Strømsgodset | 3–1 | Hødd | Drammen |
| 19:00 | Ardraa (yellow card) 63' (red card); Wikheim 75'; Taaje 90+1'; Andreas Heredia-Randen 90+7' | Report | Martin Håheim Elveseter 67' | Stadium: Marienlyst Stadion |

| 30 August 2026 20 | Sogndal | 2–3 | Strømsgodset | Sogndalsfjøra |
| 17:00 | Skaanes 18'; Kparobo Arierhi 77'; Pippola (yellow card) 81'; Rooney Onyango (yellow card) 85' | Report | Melkersen 7' 22' 90' | Stadium: Fosshaugane Campus |

| 5 September 2026 21 | Odd | 1–1 | Strømsgodset | Skien |
| 16:00 | Daniel Söderberg (yellow card) 46'; Hans Christian Bonnesen (yellow card) 48'; Kasper Andersen 58' (pen.) | Report | Melkersen 33'; Valsvik (yellow card) 53'; Ole Kristian Enersen (yellow card) 57' | Stadium: Skagerak Arena |

| 13 September 2026 22 | Strømsgodset | 4–1 | Sandnes Ulf | Drammen |
| 17:00 | Taaje 32' 37'; Melkersen 45+1'; Erik Frøland 52' | Report | Martin Sundberg 34'; Malthe Henriksen (yellow card) 83'; Olaf Bárdarson (yellow card) 90+3' | Stadium: Marienlyst Stadion; Referee: (Sweden) Fredrik Oppong |

| 20 September 2026 23 | Raufoss | 0–2 | Strømsgodset | Raufoss |
| 17:00 | Markus Aanesland (yellow card) 11' | Report | Melkersen 45+1' 57'; Antonsen (red card) 85' | Stadium: Nammo Stadion |

| 3 October 2026 24 | Strømsgodset | 1–0 | Åsane | Drammen |
| 16:00 | Melkersen 46' | Report | | Stadium: Marienlyst Stadion |

| 11 October 2026 25 | Lyn | 1–5 | Strømsgodset | Oslo |
| 17:00 | Mathias Johansen (yellow card) 50'; Anders Bjørntvedt Olsen 62' | Report | Melkersen 22' 58'; Ardraa 33'; Stengel 41'; Krasniqi 46' | Stadium: Bislett Stadium |

| 14 October 2026 26 | Strømsgodset | 5–1 | Kongsvinger | Drammen |
| 19:00 | Stengel 2'; Pingel 18' 31' 42'; Mehnert 79' | Report | Johnson 88' | Stadium: Marienlyst Stadion |

| 18 October 2026 27 | Strømsgodset | 5–0 | Haugesund | Drammen |
| 14:30 | Antonsen 8' (yellow card) 44'; Pingel 28'; Valsvik 43'; Taaje (yellow card) 45+2'; Melkersen 52'; Stengel 85' | Report | | Stadium: Marienlyst Stadion |

| 25 October 2026 28 | Strømmen | 1–0 | Strømsgodset | Lillestrøm |
| 13:00 | Gal Grobelnik (yellow card) 24'; Cameron Crestani (yellow card) 52'; Simen Beck (yellow card) 55'; Julian Kristengard 73' | Report | | Stadium: Strømmen Stadion |

| 1 November 2026 29 | Strømsgodset | 3–0 | Moss | Drammen |
| 17:00 | Stengel 5'; Melkersen 10'; Valsvik 90+2' | Report | Niclas Schjøth Semmen (yellow card) 7'; Patrik Andersen (yellow card) 59'; Marius Christiansen (yellow card) 90' | Stadium: Marienlyst Stadion |

| 8 November 2026 30 | Stabæk | 2–3 | Strømsgodset | Bærum |
| 13:00 | Aleksa Matić 3'; Eirik Lereng 45'; Hanstad (yellow card) 90' | Report | Krasniqi 8' (yellow card) 14'; Ardraa 24'; Pingel 75' | Stadium: Nye Nadderud stadion |

=== Norwegian Football Cup ===
| 23 August 2026 First round | Modum | 0–6 | Strømsgodset | Geithus |
| 16:00 | | Report | Andreas Heredia-Randen 4'; Krasniqi 21'; Melkersen (yellow card) 27' (goal) 39' 42' 45'; Samuel Silalahi 89' | Stadium: Rolighetsmoen; Attendance: 1,528; Referee: (Norway) Herman Leiulfsrud Aass |

| 8 September 2026 Second round | Asker | 1–4 | Strømsgodset | Asker |
| 19:00 | Roman Fazi 48'; Eskild Braathen Fredriksen (yellow card) 57'; Matias Spiten-Nysæter (yellow card) 69'; Erik Hejer 74' (o.g.) (yellow card) 85' | Report | Erik Ingebrethsen 27'; Ardraa 30'; Mehnert 38'; Ole Kristian Enersen (yellow card) 86' | Stadium: Føyka Stadion; Attendance: 1,302; Referee: (Norway) Anders Bodding |

| 28 October 2026 Third round | Molde | 4–1 | Strømsgodset | Molde |
| 18:00 | Trent Koné-Doherty 11'; Risa (yellow card) 30'; Wolji Jalal Abdullai 42'; Niklas Ødegård 89' 90' | Report | Victor Dedes 20'; Wikheim (yellow card) 37'; Andreas Heredia-Randen (yellow card) 54' | Stadium: Aker Stadion; Attendance: 2,265; Referee: (Norway) Sigurd Smehus Kringstad |
