= Alex Mellemgaard =

Faroese footballer (born 1991)

Personal information
- Date of birth: 27 November 1991 (age 34)
- Position: Left back

Team information
- Current team: B68 Toftir
- Number: 12

Senior career*
Years	Team	Apps	(Gls)
2008–2012	Argja Bóltfelag	97	(23)
2014–2022	B36 Tórshavn	154	(20)
2023	B68 Toftir	22	(3)
2024	B36 Tórshavn II	6	(1)
2024–	B68 Toftir	3	(2)

International career
2018	Faroe Islands	1	(0)
- * Club domestic league appearances and goals as of 27 October 2024

Alex Mellemgaard (born 27 November 1991) is a Faroese international footballer who plays as a left back for B68 Toftir.

== Career ==
He has played club football for Argja Bóltfelag and B36 Tórshavn.

He made his international debut for the Faroe Islands in 2018.
