= Fredrik Ardraa =

Norwegian footballer (born 2006)

Personal information
- Full name: Fredrik Pau Vilaseca Ardraa
- Date of birth: 7 October 2006 (age 20)
- Height: 1.72 m (5 ft 8 in)
- Position: Midfielder

Team information
- Current team: Strømsgodset
- Number: 16

Youth career
- –2019: Stoppen
- 2020–2024: Strømsgodset

Senior career*
Years	Team	Apps	(Gls)
2024–	Strømsgodset	32	(3)

International career^{‡}
2022	Norway U16	5	(0)
2023	Norway U17	6	(0)
2024	Norway U18	5	(2)
2025	Norway U19	5	(1)
2025–	Norway U21	1	(1)
- * Club domestic league appearances and goals as of 1 January 2026 ‡ National team caps and goals as of 1 January 2026

Fredrik Ardraa (born 7 October 2006) is a Norwegian footballer who plays as a midfielder for Strømsgodset.

== Club career ==
He grew up in Lier and played youth football for Stoppen before joining the academy of Strømsgodset. He signed a pro contract with Strømsgodset in early 2023, looking to become a member of the first team later. He helped win the 2023 Norwegian Youth Cup and played in the 2024–25 UEFA Youth League.

Ardraa made his first-team debut in April 2024, first in the cup against Hallingdal and six days later in the league against KFUM. His first goal came in August 2024 against Brann. After the 2024 season, he was officially included in the senior squad, and by 2025 he was an established player, having scored in the season opener against Rosenborg. In an internal award, Ardraa was named Young Player of the Year in 2025. However, Strømsgodset were relegated from the 2025 Eliteserien.

== International career ==
He was a Norway youth international since 2022. Originally meant to play the 2025 UEFA European Under-19 Championship, Ardraa was pulled out of the squad by new Strømsgodset manager Dag-Eilev Fagermo. He received his first callup to Norway U21 in September 2025. Though Norway U21 lost 1–4 to Spain U21, Ardraa scored the Norwegian goal.

== Personal life ==
He is of Spanish descent.
