= Eemeli Raittinen =

Finnish footballer (born 2000)

Personal information
- Full name: Eemeli Herman Raittinen
- Date of birth: 3 February 2000 (age 26)
- Height: 1.96 m (6 ft 5 in)
- Position: Forward

Team information
- Current team: AC Oulu
- Number: 47

Senior career*
Years	Team	Apps	(Gls)
2019–2021	Ilves	16	(0)
2019	→ Haka (loan)	2	(1)
2021-2022	HJS	46	(22)
2023	AC Oulu	2	(0)
2023–	OLS	106	(65)
- * Club domestic league appearances and goals as of 7 November 2026

Eemeli Herman Raittinen (born 3 February 2000) is a Finnish footballer who plays as a forward for Oulun Luistinseura (OLS).

In the 2023 season, Raittinen scored 16 goals for OLS, the reserve team of AC Oulu, making him the best goalscorer in the Kakkonen Group C, in the Finnish third tier. On 30 November 2023, he extended his contract with the AC Oulu organisation for the 2024 season.

== Career statistics ==
As of 7 November 2026.

Appearances and goals by club, season and competition
Club	Season	League			Cup		League cup		Europe		Total	
Club	Season	Division	Apps	Goals	Apps	Goals	Apps	Goals	Apps	Goals	Apps	Goals
Ilves II	2018	Kolmonen	15	5	–		–		–		15	5
Ilves II	2019	Kakkonen	18	9	–		–		–		18	9
Ilves II	2020	Kakkonen	10	2	–		–		–		10	2
Ilves II	Total		43	16	0	0	0	0	0	0	43	16
Ilves	2019	Veikkausliiga	7	0	7	1	–		–		14	1
Ilves	2020	Veikkausliiga	9	0	1	0	–		–		10	0
Ilves	2021	Veikkausliiga	0	0	3	0	–		–		3	0
Ilves	Total		16	0	11	1	0	0	0	0	27	1
Haka (loan)	2019	Ykkönen	2	1	–		–		–		2	1
HJS	2021	Kakkonen	22	9	–		–		–		22	9
HJS	2022	Kakkonen	24	13	4	1	–		–		28	14
HJS	Total		46	22	4	1	0	0	0	0	50	23
AC Oulu	2023	Veikkausliiga	2	0	–		5	0	–		7	0
OLS	2023	Kakkonen	22	16	2	1	–		–		24	17
OLS	2024	Ykkönen	27	9	2	1	–		–		29	10
OLS	2025	Ykkönen	29	20	4	2	–		–		33	22
OLS	2026	Ykkönen	27	19	1	0	–		–		28	19
OLS	Total		105	64	9	3	0	0	0	0	114	68
Career total			214	103	24	6	5	0	1	0	243	109

== Honours ==
AC Oulu

- Finnish League Cup runner-up: 2023

Individual

- Kakkonen Group C Player of the Year: 2023
