= Kevin Žižek =

Slovenian footballer

Personal information
- Date of birth: 21 June 1998 (age 28)
- Place of birth: Maribor, Slovenia
- Height: 1.86 m (6 ft 1 in)
- Position: Forward

Youth career
- –2012: Pobrežje
- 2012–2014: Maribor
- 2014–2016: Bravo
- 2017: 1. FC Nürnberg

Senior career*
| Years | Team | Apps | (Gls) |
| 2018–2019 | 1. FC Nürnberg II | 5 | (0) |
| 2019–2021 | Mura | 46 | (4) |
| 2021–2022 | Celje | 7 | (0) |
| 2022 | Táborsko | 3 | (0) |

International career
| 2014–2015 | Slovenia U17 | 11 | (3) |
| 2016 | Slovenia U18 | 6 | (3) |
| 2016 | Slovenia U19 | 6 | (4) |
- * Club domestic league appearances and goals as of 17 February 2024

Kevin Žižek (born 21 June 1998) is a Slovenian footballer who plays as a forward.
