= Robbie McDaid (association footballer) =

Northern Irish footballer (born 1996)

Personal information
- Date of birth: 23 October 1996 (age 30)
- Place of birth: Omagh, Northern Ireland
- Position: Striker

Team information
- Current team: Linfield
- Number: 14

Senior career*
Years	Team	Apps	(Gls)
2012–2014	Glenavon	10	(2)
2014–2016	Leeds United	0	(0)
2016	→ Lincoln City (loan)	16	(4)
2016	York City	6	(0)
2017	Chorley	10	(1)
2017–2022	Glentoran	154	(55)
2022–	Linfield	36	(7)
- * Club domestic league appearances and goals as of 29 April 2026

Robbie McDaid (born 23 October 1996) is a Northern Irish footballer who plays as a striker for Linfield.

== Early life ==
McDaid was born in 1996 in Northern Ireland. He is a native of County Tyrone, Northern Ireland.

== Career ==
In 2017, McDaid signed for Northern Irish side Glentoran. In 2022, he signed for Northern Irish side Linfield.

McDaid mainly operates as a striker. He operated as a winger while playing for Northern Irish side Glentoran.

== Personal life ==
McDaid is the son of a Northern Irish footballer. He has worked as a teacher for disabled children.

== Career statistics ==
=== Club ===
As of 9 August 2024

Appearances and goals by club, season and competition
Club	Season	League			National Cup		League Cup		Continental		Other		Total	
Club	Season	Division	Apps	Goals	Apps	Goals	Apps	Goals	Apps	Goals	Apps	Goals	Apps	Goals
Glenavon	2012-13	NIFL Premiership	5	0	1	0	—		—		—		6	0
Glenavon	2013-14	NIFL Premiership	5	2	—		—		—		—		5	2
Glenavon	Total		10	2	1	0	—		—		—		11	2
Lincoln City (loan)	2015-16	National League	16	4	—		—		—		—		16	4
York City	2016-17	National League	6	0	—		—		—		0	0	6	0
Chorley	2016-17	National League North	10	1	—		—		—		—		10	1
Glentoran	2017-18	NIFL Premiership	34	10	2	0	—		—		—		36	10
Glentoran	2018-19	NIFL Premiership	32	13	—		2	1	—		—		34	14
Glentoran	2019-20	NIFL Premiership	29	15	4	6	—		—		—		33	21
Glentoran	2020-21	NIFL Premiership	30	12	—		—		2 (Note: Appearance(s) in UEFA Europa League)	2	—		32	14
Glentoran	2021-22	NIFL Premiership	29	5	3	4	2	1	2 (Note: Appearance(s) in UEFA Europa Conference League)	0	—		36	10
Glentoran	Total		154	55	9	10	4	2	4	2	—		171	69
Linfield	2022-23	NIFL Premiership	24	6	1	1	3	1	7 (Note: Four appearances in UEFA Champions League, One appearance in UEFA Europa League, Two appearances in UEFA Europa League)	0	1 (Note: Appearance(s) in Scottish Challenge Cup)	0	36	8
Linfield	2023-24	NIFL Premiership	0	0	—		—		—		—		0	0
Linfield	2024-25	NIFL Premiership	—		—		—		0	0	—		0	0
Linfield	Total		24	6	1	1	3	1	7	0	1	0	36	8
Career Total			220	68	11	11	7	3	11	2	1	0	250	84
