= Mattias Lamhauge =

Faroese footballer (born 1999)

Personal information
- Full name: Mattias Heðinsson Lamhauge
- Date of birth: 2 August 1999 (age 27)
- Place of birth: Faroe Islands
- Height: 1.94 m (6 ft 4 in)
- Position: Goalkeeper

Team information
- Current team: Strømsgodset
- Number: 1

Youth career
- HB

Senior career*
Years	Team	Apps	(Gls)
2016	HB II	7	(0)
2017–2020	HB	0	(0)
2018	→ Argja Bóltfelag (loan)	2	(0)
2019	→ Argja Bóltfelag (loan)	8	(0)
2020–2023	B36	81	(0)
2024–2025	Fredericia	30	(0)
2026–	Strømsgodset	23	(0)

International career^{‡}
2019	Faroe Islands U17	2	(0)
2022–	Faroe Islands	22	(0)
- * Club domestic league appearances and goals as of 14 November 2026 ‡ National team caps and goals as of 16 November 2026

Mattias Heðinsson Lamhauge (born 2 August 1999) is a Faroese professional footballer who plays as a goalkeeper for Strømsgodset and the Faroe Islands national team.

== Career ==
Mattias Lamhauge started his career at Tórshavn-based side HB, but never played for the first team, as he was twice loaned out to Argja Bóltfelag. He moved to HB's rivals B36 in 2020, and established himself as their starting goalkeeper. His performances earned him a move to NordicBet Liga team FC Fredericia in January 2024.

Lamhauge made his international debut for the Faroe Islands on 29 March 2022 in a friendly match against Liechtenstein, which finished as a 0–1 away loss. His first qualifying match was played in the UEFA Euro 2024 qualifying against Moldova, which finished 1–1.

On 10 January 2026, Lamhauge joined newly relegated Norwegian First Division club Strømsgodset on a three-year deal.

== Career statistics ==
=== International ===
As of match played 6 October 2026

Faroe Islands
Year	Apps	Goals
2022	2	0
2023	6	0
2024	1	0
2025	6	0
2026	5	0
Total	20	0

== Personal life ==
Lamhauge works as a Sales Representative while also playing football.

== Honours ==
B36 Tórshavn

- Faroe Islands Cup: 2021
