= Sebastian Pingel =

Danish footballer (born 1993)

Personal information
- Date of birth: 11 May 1993 (age 33)
- Height: 1.79 m (5 ft 10 in)
- Position: Striker

Team information
- Current team: Strømsgodset
- Number: 11

Youth career
- –2012: AGF

Senior career*
Years	Team	Apps	(Gls)
2012–2013	Brabrand		
2013–2016	Odder		
2016	B36	20	(10)
2017–2019	HB	48	(14)
2020–2021	B36	42	(18)
2022–2023	Phönix Lübeck	48	(13)
2023–2024	Hillerød	31	(18)
2024–2026	Horsens	46	(18)
2026–	Strømsgodset	28	(20)
- * Club domestic league appearances and goals as of 11 November 2026

Sebastian Pingel (born 11 May 1993) is a Danish footballer who plays as a striker for Strømsgodset.

== Personal life ==
He is a son of football striker Frank Pingel.

== Career ==
He played youth football for AGF. In his early senior career, he played in the Danish 2nd Division, the third tier, for Brabrand IF and Odder IGF.

Playing in the Faroe Islands for B36 in 2016 and 2020–2021 as well as HB in 2017–2019, he continued his career abroad with German fourth-tier team 1. FC Phönix Lübeck. He desired to move back to Denmark in 2023, and chose Hillerød.

For Hillerød, Pingel became the top goalscorer of the 2023–24 Danish 1st Division with 18 goals. Turning 31 years old that year, he was running out of opportunities to play in the Danish Superliga before his career would end. He made a transfer in the summer of 2024, but only to another 1st Division club, AC Horsens.

While he scored a fair amount of goals for Horsens, it appeared that the club made future plans which did not involve Pingel. He ended up signing for newly relegated Norwegian First Division club Strømsgodset. During the first half of the season, he averaged more than one goal per game. The club compared him to Marcus Pedersen as a striker type. One round before the league was over, Strømsgodset secured direct promotion with Pingel making it into the top 3 in the top goalscorers' table.
