= 1991 FIFA U-17 World Championship squads =

== Group A ==
=== Italy ===
Head coach: (Italy) Sergio Vatta

No.	Pos.	Player	Date of birth (age)	Caps	Club
1	GK	Diego Mainardis	8 January 1975 (aged 16)		(Italy) Juventus
2	DF	Alessandro Rinaldi	23 November 1974 (aged 16)		(Italy) Lazio
3	DF	Alessandro Birindelli	12 November 1974 (aged 16)		(Italy) Empoli
4	DF	Luigi Sartor	30 January 1975 (aged 16)		(Italy) Juventus
5	DF	Daniele Giraldi	6 November 1974 (aged 16)		(Italy) Fiorentina
6	MF	Francesco Tortorelli	17 September 1974 (aged 16)		(Italy) Milan
7	FW	Alessandro Del Piero	9 November 1974 (aged 16)		(Italy) Padova
8	MF	Marco Caputi	14 November 1974 (aged 16)		(Italy) Roma
9	FW	Eddy Baggio	23 September 1974 (aged 16)		(Italy) Fiorentina
10	MF	Ivano Della Morte	13 October 1974 (aged 16)		(Italy) Torino
11	MF	Mirco Poloni	18 September 1974 (aged 16)		(Italy) Atalanta
12	GK	Matteo Sereni	11 February 1975 (aged 16)		(Italy) Sampdoria
13	FW	Giovanni Chiummiello	6 September 1974 (aged 16)		(Italy) Fiorentina
14	FW	Maurizio Sala	20 February 1975 (aged 16)		(Italy) Sampdoria
15	DF	Fabio Moro	13 July 1975 (aged 16)		(Italy) Milan
16	DF	Mirko Conte	12 August 1974 (aged 17)		(Italy) Internazionale
17	MF	Rosario Cerminara	7 October 1974 (aged 16)		(Italy) Udinese
18	MF	Graziano Larusso	27 August 1974 (aged 16)		(Italy) Bologna

=== United States ===
Head coach: (United States) Roy Rees

No.	Pos.	Player	Date of birth (age)	Caps	Club
1	GK	Kyle Campbell	19 April 1975 (aged 16)		(United States) La Jolla Nomads
2	DF	Matt McKeon	24 September 1974 (aged 16)		(United States) San Louis Billikens
3	DF	Michael Dunne	19 May 1975 (aged 16)		(United States) Sockers FC
4	MF	Gabe Serda	15 June 1975 (aged 16)		(United States) Internacionale San Antonio
5	FW	Temoc Suarez	19 April 1975 (aged 16)		(United States) Charleston Battery
6	FW	Cesar Torres	24 February 1975 (aged 16)		(United States) Albany Capitals
7	DF	Shawn Bryden	19 October 1974 (aged 16)		(United States) Texans
8	DF	Julio Guzman	5 February 1975 (aged 16)		(United States) Miami FC
9	MF	Mike Slivinski	31 October 1974 (aged 16)		(United States) Scott Gallagher Soccer Complex
10	FW	Mark Jonas	17 October 1974 (aged 16)		(United States) Bethesda
11	MF	Nelson Vargas	6 August 1974 (aged 17)		(United States) Emerson Express
12	MF	Albertin Montoya	19 February 1975 (aged 16)		(United States) North Carolina State
13	FW	Shohn Beachum	5 July 1975 (aged 16)		(United States) ISA United
14	DF	Roy Gmitter	2 August 1974 (aged 17)		(United States) Santa Rosa United
15	DF	Mike Fisher	28 May 1975 (aged 16)		(United States) Sockers FC
16	MF	Brian Kelly	6 October 1974 (aged 16)		(United States) Delco FC
17	DF	Will Kohler	13 March 1975 (aged 16)		(United States) Narberth
18	GK	Salomon Fontana	11 April 1975 (aged 16)		(United States) Bohemia 74

=== China ===
Head coach: (China) Zhu Guanghu

No.	Pos.	Player	Date of birth (age)	Caps	Club
1	GK	Yao Jian	30 September 1974 (aged 16)		(China) Beijing
2	DF	Chen Gang	7 November 1974 (aged 16)		(China) Qingdao
3	MF	Zhu Qi	24 October 1974 (aged 16)		(China) Shanghai
4	MF	Gao Fei	29 September 1974 (aged 16)		(China) Tianjin
5	DF	Xiao Jian	26 November 1974 (aged 16)		(China) Bayi
6	DF	Huang Yi	26 October 1974 (aged 16)		(China) Shanghai
7	DF	Qiu Zhihua	20 September 1974 (aged 16)		(China) Guangdong
8	MF	Hong Maoren	24 August 1974 (aged 16)		(China) Nanjing Army
9	FW	Zhuang Yi	11 July 1973 (aged 18)		(China) Liaoning
10	FW	Liang Yu	26 September 1974 (aged 16)		(China) Tianjin
11	FW	Pan Yi	20 December 1974 (aged 16)		(China) Bayi
12	MF	Deng Lejun	18 September 1971 (aged 19)		(China) Beijing
13	FW	Song Aijie	4 October 1974 (aged 16)		(China) Bayi
14	MF	Zhang Bin	20 October 1974 (aged 16)		(China) Hubei
15	GK	Wang Hao	7 September 1974 (aged 16)		(China) Qingdao
16	DF	Dong Weiguo	3 November 1974 (aged 16)		(China) Guangdong
17	MF	Zhang Bo	14 August 1974 (aged 17)		(China) Hubei

- Only 17 players in China's squad. (18) Xie Hui FW 02/14/1975 Shanghai Shenhua China.

=== Argentina ===
Head coach: (Argentina) Reinaldo Merlo

No.	Pos.	Player	Date of birth (age)	Caps	Club
1	GK	Raul Sanzotti	12 January 1975 (aged 16)		(Argentina) Argentinos Juniors
2	DF	Ricardo Castellani	23 May 1975 (aged 16)		(Argentina) River Plate
3	DF	Rodolfo Arruabarrena	20 July 1975 (aged 16)		(Argentina) Boca Juniors
4	DF	Gustavo Lombardi	10 September 1975 (aged 15)		(Argentina) River Plate
5	MF	Silvio Rivero	2 January 1975 (aged 16)		(Argentina) Boca Juniors
6	DF	Carlos Chaile	14 January 1975 (aged 16)		(Argentina) Ferro Carril Oeste
7	FW	Rubén Bernuncio	19 January 1976 (aged 15)		(Argentina) San Lorenzo
8	MF	Claudio Husaín	20 November 1974 (aged 16)		(Argentina) Vélez Sársfield
9	FW	Luciano Oliveri	9 July 1975 (aged 16)		(Argentina) Racing Club
10	MF	Marcelo Gallardo	18 January 1976 (aged 15)		(Argentina) River Plate
11	MF	Juan Sebastián Verón	9 March 1975 (aged 16)		(Argentina) Estudiantes de La Plata
12	GK	Damián Garófalo	12 April 1975 (aged 16)		(Argentina) Estudiantes de La Plata
13	DF	Ariel Zapata	2 September 1974 (aged 16)		(Argentina) Estudiantes de La Plata
14	FW	Ángel Morales	14 June 1975 (aged 16)		(Argentina) Independiente
15	FW	Rubén Comelles	4 April 1975 (aged 16)		(Argentina) Argentinos Juniors
16	DF	Juan Manuel Azconzábal	8 September 1974 (aged 16)		(Argentina) Estudiantes de La Plata
17	MF	Christian Akselman	17 August 1974 (aged 16)		(Argentina) Racing Club
18	MF	Norberto Alonso	27 January 1975 (aged 16)		(Argentina) River Plate

== Group B ==
=== Congo ===
Head coach: (Germany) Joachim Fickert

No.	Pos.	Player	Date of birth (age)	Caps	Club
1	GK	Moyere Ngankia	1 October 1976 (aged 14)		(Republic of the Congo) Kotoko MFOA
2	FW	Compaigne Ntsika	22 October 1974 (aged 16)		(Republic of the Congo) CARA
3	FW	Hugues Loubaki-Moukandi	1 December 1974 (aged 16)		(Republic of the Congo) Diables Noirs
4	DF	Davy Mboyo	28 November 1976 (aged 14)		(Republic of the Congo) Kotoko MFOA
5	DF	Elie Malonga	21 September 1975 (aged 15)		(Republic of the Congo) Club 57
6	DF	Christis Milembolo	19 September 1974 (aged 16)		(Republic of the Congo) Cérémonial
7	FW	Ange Kissita	5 February 1975 (aged 16)		(Republic of the Congo) US Agip
8	MF	Jaures Bitambiki	27 June 1975 (aged 16)		(Republic of the Congo) Club 57
9	DF	Roland Buitys	15 August 1974 (aged 17)		(Republic of the Congo) Kotoko MFOA
10	MF	Patrick Tchicaya	14 October 1974 (aged 16)		(Republic of the Congo) Label PME
11	MF	Gaston Kibiti	11 August 1974 (aged 17)		(Republic of the Congo) Pigeon Vert
12	FW	Sylvère Boungou	20 June 1975 (aged 16)		(Republic of the Congo) Inter Club
13	DF	Assane Tope	18 December 1975 (aged 15)		(Republic of the Congo) Label PME
14	MF	Francis Makaya	12 August 1975 (aged 16)		(Republic of the Congo) Juventus
15	MF	Frédéric Ntontomona	28 August 1974 (aged 16)		(Republic of the Congo) Club 57
16	GK	Jean Goma-Boumba	29 August 1974 (aged 16)		(Republic of the Congo) US Agip
17	DF	Patrick Kombo	30 April 1975 (aged 16)		(Republic of the Congo) Club 57
18	MF	Emanuel Moussounda-Mpassi	17 March 1975 (aged 16)		(Republic of the Congo) CARA

=== Qatar ===
Head coach: (Brazil) José Roberto Avila

No.	Pos.	Player	Date of birth (age)	Caps	Club
1	GK	Hussain Al-Romaihi	12 September 1974 (aged 16)		Qatar SC
2	DF	Jassim Al-Tamimi	10 August 1974 (aged 17)		(Qatar) Al-Wakrah
3	DF	Khalil Al-Mazroei	1 October 1974 (aged 16)		(Qatar) Al-Wakrah
4	DF	Ali Al-Haj	12 October 1974 (aged 16)		(Qatar) Al-Arabi
5	DF	Khalid Al-Kuwari	5 December 1974 (aged 16)		(Qatar) Al-Shamal
6	DF	Rayed Al-Boloushi	15 October 1974 (aged 16)		(Qatar) Al-Arabi
7	FW	Ahmed Mubarak Al Shafi	25 September 1974 (aged 16)		(Qatar) Al-Rayyan
8	MF	Ali Al-Ali	23 December 1974 (aged 16)		(Qatar) Al-Sadd
9	FW	Mohamed Al-Bedaid	14 October 1974 (aged 16)		(Qatar) Al-Rayyan
10	FW	Mohammed Salem Al-Enazi	22 November 1976 (aged 14)		(Qatar) Al-Rayyan
11	FW	Yousuf Al-Wadaani	27 November 1974 (aged 16)		(Qatar) Al-Ahli
12	GK	Essa Abu	28 February 1975 (aged 16)		(Qatar) Al-Arabi
13	DF	Ahmed Bu	25 October 1974 (aged 16)		Qatar SC
14	MF	Yousuf Al-Kuwari	10 October 1974 (aged 16)		(Qatar) Al-Arabi
15	MF	Ali Al-Malki	20 September 1974 (aged 16)		Qatar SC
16	FW	Khalil Al-Malki	11 September 1974 (aged 16)		(Qatar) Al-Arabi
17	MF	Khalid Al-Naemi	23 September 1974 (aged 16)		Qatar SC
18	MF	Ghanim Al-Kuwari	11 September 1974 (aged 16)		Qatar SC

=== Australia ===
Head coach: (Germany) Les Scheinflug

No.	Pos.	Player	Date of birth (age)	Caps	Club
1	GK	Steven Wardle	16 November 1974 (aged 16)		(Australia) South Melbourne
2	DF	João Pires	20 September 1974 (aged 16)		(Australia) Adelaide Hellas
3	DF	Tony Josevski	3 March 1975 (aged 16)		(Australia) St. George
4	DF	Aaron Healey	24 November 1974 (aged 16)		(Australia) South Melbourne
5	DF	Craig Moore	12 December 1975 (aged 15)		(Australia) North Star
6	DF	Paul Dee	13 August 1974 (aged 17)		(Australia) St. George
7	MF	Anthony Carbone	13 October 1974 (aged 16)		(Australia) Australian Institute of Sport
8	MF	Fabio Macolino	23 August 1974 (aged 16)		(Australia) St. George
9	FW	Vasilios Kalogeracos	21 March 1975 (aged 16)		(Australia) Australian Institute of Sport
10	FW	Alex Kiratzoglou	27 August 1974 (aged 16)		(Australia) South Melbourne
11	FW	Vasko Trpcevski	7 March 1975 (aged 16)		(Australia) Sunshine George Cross
12	DF	Matthew Coutouvidis	18 February 1975 (aged 16)		(Australia) Salisbury United
13	MF	Lorenzo Campagna	6 September 1974 (aged 16)		(Australia) St. George
14	MF	Tom Haythornthwaite	20 September 1974 (aged 16)		(Australia) Melita Eagles
15	MF	Darren Iocca	29 August 1974 (aged 16)		(Australia) Marconi Stallions
16	FW	Paul Agostino	9 June 1975 (aged 16)		(Australia) Adelaide Hellas
17	DF	Dominic Usalj	22 August 1974 (aged 16)		(Australia) St. George
18	GK	Geof Callinan	10 August 1974 (aged 17)		(Australia) Adamstown Rosebuds

=== Mexico ===
Head coach: (Mexico) Juan Manuel Álvarez

No.	Pos.	Player	Date of birth (age)	Caps	Club
1	GK	Víctor Silva	23 November 1975 (aged 15)		(Mexico) América
2	DF	José Maldonado	30 August 1974 (aged 16)		(Mexico) Atlas
3	DF	Jorge Avendaño	2 November 1974 (aged 16)		(Mexico) Cruz Azul
4	DF	Genoni Martínez	22 February 1975 (aged 16)		(Mexico) América
5	DF	Rafael Astivia	9 April 1975 (aged 16)		(Mexico) América
6	MF	Luís Alcocer	8 August 1974 (aged 17)		(Mexico) Guadalajara
7	MF	Joel Sánchez	17 August 1974 (aged 16)		(Mexico) Guadalajara
8	MF	Mario Garza	5 December 1974 (aged 16)		(Mexico) Monterrey
9	FW	Roberto García	26 May 1975 (aged 16)		(Mexico) Tecos UAG
10	MF	Rafael García	14 August 1974 (aged 17)		(Mexico) UNAM
11	FW	Carlos Cantú	13 December 1975 (aged 15)		(Mexico) UANL
12	GK	Rubén Salas	4 August 1974 (aged 17)		(Mexico) Veracruz
13	FW	Jorge Toledano	2 February 1975 (aged 16)		(Mexico) América
14	DF	Rodolfo Vega	4 December 1974 (aged 16)		(Mexico) UNAM
15	MF	Johan Rodríguez	15 August 1975 (aged 16)		(Mexico) Cedros
16	DF	Omar Rodríguez	15 August 1975 (aged 16)		(Mexico) Cedros
17	FW	Pedro Resendiz	15 December 1974 (aged 16)		(Mexico) Cruz Azul
18	MF	Mario Trevino	11 September 1975 (aged 15)		(Mexico) UANL

== Group C ==
=== Sudan ===
Head coach: (Sudan) Abdel Aziz Suliman

No.	Pos.	Player	Date of birth (age)	Caps	Club
1	GK	Adil Yahya	14 November 1974 (aged 16)		(Sudan) Al-Zahra
2	DF	Seifeldin Abdel	12 August 1974 (aged 17)		(Sudan) Al-Shabia
3	DF	Muhamed Hamdan	6 April 1975 (aged 16)		(Sudan) Al-Ittihad
4	MF	Abdalla Hassan	10 March 1975 (aged 16)		(Sudan) Al-Sabahi
5	DF	Akef Ataa	3 December 1975 (aged 15)		(Sudan) Al-Hilal
6	MF	Malik Hassan	1 April 1975 (aged 16)		(Sudan) Alamal SC (Atbara)
7	MF	Esam Ali	20 September 1974 (aged 16)		(Sudan) Al-Thuria SC (Bahri)
8	MF	Muhamed Ageed	11 September 1974 (aged 16)		(Sudan) Al-Hilal
9	DF	Abdelwahab Belal	4 December 1974 (aged 16)		(Sudan) Al Ahly Shendy
10	MF	Ibrahim Hussein	25 September 1975 (aged 15)		(Sudan) Al-Merreikh
11	FW	Nemairi Ahmed Saeed	13 December 1974 (aged 16)		(Sudan) Al-Hilal
12	MF	Husham Abdelhai	26 March 1975 (aged 16)		(Sudan) Al-Merreikh
13	FW	Mustafa Komi	13 August 1974 (aged 17)		(Sudan) Al-Shabia
14	DF	Osama Ahmed	5 April 1975 (aged 16)		(Sudan) Al Mawrada
15	MF	Khalid Ahmed Elmustafa	25 July 1975 (aged 16)		(Sudan) Al-Merreikh
16	DF	Mustafa Abdalla	9 August 1974 (aged 17)		(Sudan) Al-Hilal
17	FW	Eltag Adam	2 August 1974 (aged 17)		(Sudan) Al-Abasiya
18	GK	Ali Hassan	2 March 1975 (aged 16)		(Sudan) Al-Ittihad

=== United Arab Emirates ===
Head coach: (United Arab Emirates) Ishao Benjamin Zia

No.	Pos.	Player	Date of birth (age)	Caps	Club
1	GK	Juma Rashed	12 December 1972 (aged 18)		(United Arab Emirates) Al-Shabab
2	DF	Mukhtar Khalil	14 November 1974 (aged 16)		(United Arab Emirates) Al-Wasl
3	MF	Munzir Hassan	12 January 1975 (aged 16)		(United Arab Emirates) Al-Wasl
4	DF	Khalid Abdullah	25 December 1974 (aged 16)		(United Arab Emirates) Al-Wasl
5	MF	Adel Mohamed	15 November 1974 (aged 16)		(United Arab Emirates) Al-Ittihad
6	DF	Ali Abdulrahman	13 November 1974 (aged 16)		(United Arab Emirates) Al-Shaab CSC
7	DF	Adnan Saleh	4 September 1974 (aged 16)		(United Arab Emirates) Al-Wahda
8	DF	Ali Mubarak	23 December 1974 (aged 16)		(United Arab Emirates) Al-Wahda
9	FW	Ahmed Jumaa	16 November 1974 (aged 16)		(United Arab Emirates) Al-Wasl
10	MF	Gholam Ali	3 September 1974 (aged 16)		(United Arab Emirates) Al-Wasl
11	FW	Jamal Ibrahim	22 November 1974 (aged 16)		(United Arab Emirates) Al-Sharjah
12	FW	Eissa Jumaa	17 November 1974 (aged 16)		(United Arab Emirates) Al-Nasr
13	MF	Saeed Khamees	8 December 1975 (aged 15)		(United Arab Emirates) Al-Arabi
14	MF	Nasser Eissa	23 November 1974 (aged 16)		(United Arab Emirates) Al-Wasl
15	FW	Salim Mubarak	28 December 1974 (aged 16)		(United Arab Emirates) Al-Nasr
16	MF	Adel Khamees	6 September 1974 (aged 16)		(United Arab Emirates) Al-Wahda
17	GK	Salim Ahmed	19 October 1974 (aged 16)		(United Arab Emirates) Al Khaleej Club
18	DF	Faiz Ismail	19 November 1975 (aged 15)		(United Arab Emirates) Al-Wahda

=== Germany ===
Head coach: (Germany) Fritz Bischoff

No.	Pos.	Player	Date of birth (age)	Caps	Club
1	GK	Christian Fiedler	27 March 1975 (aged 16)		(Germany) Hertha BSC
2	DF	Markus Schenk	26 August 1974 (aged 16)		(Germany) FC Berlin
3	DF	Jens Rasiejewski	1 January 1975 (aged 16)		(Germany) VfL Marburg
4	DF	Lars Schiersand	14 February 1975 (aged 16)		(Germany) VfL Osnabrück
5	DF	Stefan Odenhausen	8 September 1974 (aged 16)		(Germany) Oestrich Iserlohn
6	MF	Jörg Krawczyk	23 November 1974 (aged 16)		(Germany) VfL Bochum
7	DF	Markus Bähr	10 September 1974 (aged 16)		(Germany) FC Dossenheim
8	MF	Karl-Heinz Lutz	8 March 1975 (aged 16)		(Germany) Karlsruher SC
9	MF	Christof Babatz	3 September 1974 (aged 16)		(Germany) Hannover 96
10	MF	Michael Groh	29 January 1975 (aged 16)		(Germany) Eintracht Frankfurt
11	FW	Rafael Lehmann	27 September 1974 (aged 16)		(Germany) Borussia Dortmund
12	GK	Karsten Kusch	29 November 1974 (aged 16)		(Germany) Rot-Weiss Frankfurt
13	DF	Mirko Leuschner	9 October 1974 (aged 16)		(Germany) Eintracht Frankfurt
14	FW	Sascha Lense	5 October 1975 (aged 15)		(Germany) Eintracht Frankfurt
15	MF	Oliver Buch	5 September 1974 (aged 16)		(Germany) Rot-Weiss Frankfurt
16	FW	Jens Sarna	20 September 1974 (aged 16)		(Germany) Bayer Leverkusen
17	FW	Goya Jaekel	25 October 1974 (aged 16)		(Germany) Hertha BSC
18	MF	Kai Michalke	5 April 1976 (aged 15)		(Germany) VfL Bochum

=== Brazil ===
Head coach: (Brazil) Júlio César Leal

No.	Pos.	Player	Date of birth (age)	Caps	Club
1	GK	Fábio	12 October 1975 (aged 15)		(Brazil) Flamengo
2	DF	Neguitão	1 May 1975 (aged 16)		(Brazil) Novorizontino
3	DF	Argel	4 September 1974 (aged 16)		(Brazil) Internacional
4	DF	Pericles	2 January 1975 (aged 16)		(Brazil) Vitória
5	DF	Rodrigo	23 August 1974 (aged 16)		(Brazil) Bahia
6	DF	Nenê	6 June 1975 (aged 16)		(Brazil) Juventus
7	FW	Pintinho	10 July 1975 (aged 16)		(Brazil) Vitória
8	MF	Yan	1 May 1975 (aged 16)		(Brazil) Vasco da Gama
9	FW	Gian	25 August 1974 (aged 16)		(Brazil) Vasco da Gama
10	MF	Adriano	20 September 1974 (aged 16)		(Brazil) Guaraní
11	FW	Leandro	25 January 1975 (aged 16)		(Brazil) Atlético Mineiro
12	GK	Carlos Henrique	1 May 1975 (aged 16)		(Brazil) Guaraní
13	DF	Carlinhos	5 December 1974 (aged 16)		(Brazil) Guaraní
14	DF	Ronaldo	9 October 1974 (aged 16)		(Brazil) São Paulo
15	MF	Víctor	3 November 1974 (aged 16)		(Brazil) Vasco da Gama
16	MF	Elenílson	28 April 1975 (aged 16)		(Brazil) Fluminense
17	MF	Wamberto	13 December 1974 (aged 16)		(Brazil) Sampaio Corrêa
18	FW	Dirceu	27 December 1974 (aged 16)		(Brazil) Internacional

== Group D ==
=== Ghana ===
Head coach: (Germany) Otto Pfister

No.	Pos.	Player	Date of birth (age)	Caps	Club
1	GK	Ben Owu	14 October 1974 (aged 16)		(Ghana) Soccer Missionaries
2	DF	Sebastian Barnes	18 November 1976 (aged 14)		(Ghana) Hearts of Oak
3	DF	Isaac Asare	1 September 1974 (aged 16)		(Belgium) Anderlecht
4	DF	Samuel Kuffour	3 September 1976 (aged 14)		(Ghana) King Faisal
5	DF	Kofi Nimo	1 October 1974 (aged 16)		(Ghana) Hearts of Oak
6	MF	Mohammed Gargo	19 June 1975 (aged 16)		(Ghana) Real Tamale United
7	FW	Yaw Preko	8 September 1974 (aged 16)		(Ghana) Hearts of Oak
8	FW	Nii Lamptey	10 December 1974 (aged 16)		(Belgium) Anderlecht
9	FW	Willie Brown	26 October 1974 (aged 16)		(Ghana) Soccer Missionaries
10	MF	Nana Opoku	31 August 1974 (aged 16)		(Ghana) Brong Ahafo United
11	MF	Emmanuel Duah	14 November 1976 (aged 14)		(Ghana) Neoplan Stars
12	FW	Daniel Addo	6 November 1976 (aged 14)		(Ghana) Great Olympics
13	DF	Kofi Mbeah	11 December 1974 (aged 16)		(Ghana) Soccer Missionaries
14	MF	Abdul Migima	5 December 1974 (aged 16)		(Ghana) Okwawu United
15	MF	Joseph Essien	17 December 1974 (aged 16)		(Ghana) Soccer Missionaries
16	MF	Samuel Kissi	5 September 1974 (aged 16)		(Ghana) Okwawu United
17	DF	Mark Edusei	29 September 1976 (aged 14)		(Ghana) King Faisal
18	GK	Ali Jarrah	4 October 1976 (aged 14)		(Ghana) Hearts of Oak

=== Cuba ===
Head coach: (Cuba) Manuel Rodríguez

No.	Pos.	Player	Date of birth (age)	Caps	Club
1	GK	Lazaro Sánchez	14 December 1974 (aged 16)		(Cuba) Pinar del Río
2	DF	Eliezer Casamayor	2 September 1974 (aged 16)		(Cuba) Ciudad de La Habana
3	DF	Lester Armenteros	23 December 1975 (aged 15)		(Cuba) Ciudad de La Habana
4	DF	José Piloto	31 August 1974 (aged 16)		(Cuba) Ciudad de La Habana
5	DF	Diomedes Rodríguez	11 March 1975 (aged 16)		(Cuba) Holguín
6	DF	Rafael Capo	1 April 1975 (aged 16)		(Cuba) Holguín
7	MF	Osniel Silveira	5 August 1974 (aged 17)		(Cuba) Pinar del Río
8	DF	Félix Roque	21 September 1974 (aged 16)		(Cuba) Sancti Spíritus
9	FW	Luís Rodríguez	15 October 1974 (aged 16)		(Cuba) Sancti Spíritus
10	FW	Luís Marten	10 August 1974 (aged 17)		Santiago de Cuba
11	MF	Yanko Fontanills	6 November 1975 (aged 15)		(Cuba) Cienfuegos
12	MF	Abdel Ruiz	27 August 1974 (aged 16)		(Cuba) Villa Clara
13	MF	Osmani Manzano	9 December 1975 (aged 15)		(Cuba) Holguín
14	MF	Vladimir Sánchez	7 November 1974 (aged 16)		Santiago de Cuba
15	FW	Yoel Zanetti	29 May 1975 (aged 16)		(Cuba) Villa Clara
16	FW	Osmar Peña	26 November 1974 (aged 16)		(Cuba) Camagüey
17	MF	Adrobandy Padron	21 September 1974 (aged 16)		(Cuba) Camagüey
18	GK	Odelín Molina	3 August 1974 (aged 17)		(Cuba) Villa Clara

=== Uruguay ===
Head coach: (Uruguay) Jesús Rodríguez Prado

No.	Pos.	Player	Date of birth (age)	Caps	Club
1	GK	Yany Rodríguez	19 July 1974 (aged 17)		(Uruguay) Defensor
2	DF	Diego López	22 August 1975 (aged 15)		(Uruguay) River Plate
3	DF	Tabaré Silva	30 August 1974 (aged 16)		(Uruguay) Defensor
4	DF	Marcos Madruga	23 August 1974 (aged 16)		(Uruguay) Danubio
5	MF	Sergio Benítez	26 August 1974 (aged 16)		(Uruguay) River Plate
6	DF	Gustavo Diaz	7 November 1974 (aged 16)		(Uruguay) River Plate
7	FW	Nestor Correa	23 August 1974 (aged 16)		(Uruguay) Liverpool
8	MF	Carlos Macchi	18 October 1974 (aged 16)		(Uruguay) Peñarol
9	FW	Diego Pérez	10 March 1975 (aged 16)		(Uruguay) Defensor
10	MF	Javier Delgado	8 July 1975 (aged 16)		(Uruguay) Danubio
11	MF	Juan Martín Parodi	22 September 1974 (aged 16)		(Uruguay) Paysandú
12	GK	Marcelo Suberbie	26 October 1974 (aged 16)		(Uruguay) Montevideo Wanderers
13	DF	Carlos Genta	29 January 1975 (aged 16)		(Uruguay) Danubio
14	FW	Diego Goñi	16 September 1975 (aged 15)		(Uruguay) River Plate
15	MF	Alejandro Traversa	8 September 1974 (aged 16)		(Uruguay) Defensor
16	DF	Andrés Gonzales	22 May 1975 (aged 16)		(Uruguay) Defensor
17	FW	Oscar Silva	5 September 1974 (aged 16)		(Uruguay) Progreso
18	MF	Raúl Salazar	20 August 1974 (aged 16)		(Uruguay) Rentistas

=== Spain ===
Head coach: (Spain) Juan Santisteban

No.	Pos.	Player	Date of birth (age)	Caps	Club
1	GK	Javier López Vallejo	22 September 1975 (aged 15)		(Spain) Osasuna
2	MF	José Gálvez	3 August 1974 (aged 17)		(Spain) Mallorca
3	DF	Carlos Castro	17 December 1974 (aged 16)		(Spain) Sevilla
4	DF	César Palacios	19 October 1974 (aged 16)		(Spain) Osasuna
5	DF	Quique Medina	14 September 1974 (aged 16)		(Spain) Valencia
6	DF	Ramón González	25 November 1974 (aged 16)		(Spain) Real Valladolid
7	DF	Juan Carlos Gutiérrez	9 October 1974 (aged 16)		(Spain) Barcelona
8	MF	Gerardo	7 December 1974 (aged 16)		(Spain) Osasuna
9	MF	Sandro	14 October 1974 (aged 16)		(Spain) Real Madrid
10	MF	Pedro Velasco	8 October 1974 (aged 16)		(Spain) Real Madrid
11	FW	Antonio Robaina	30 November 1974 (aged 16)		(Spain) Las Palmas
12	FW	Juan Carlos Murgui	15 November 1974 (aged 16)		(Spain) Barcelona
13	GK	Álex Sánchez	30 December 1974 (aged 16)		(Spain) Deportivo La Coruña
14	MF	Josemi López	6 August 1974 (aged 17)		(Spain) Rayo Vallecano
15	DF	Felipe Vaqueriza	23 January 1975 (aged 16)		(Spain) Real Madrid
16	MF	Emilio Carrasco	14 November 1974 (aged 16)		(Spain) Pavía
17	DF	Joyce Moreno	29 September 1974 (aged 16)		(Spain) Real Madrid
18	FW	Dani García	22 December 1974 (aged 16)		(Spain) Real Madrid
