= Neguitão =

Neguitão may refer to:

- Neguitão (sambist), Darly Silva, sambist and former president of GRES Vai-Vai
- Neguitão (footballer), Brazilian football right back Carlos Roberto Camargo (born 1975)
