= Mark Jonas =

American soccer player and coach (born 1974)

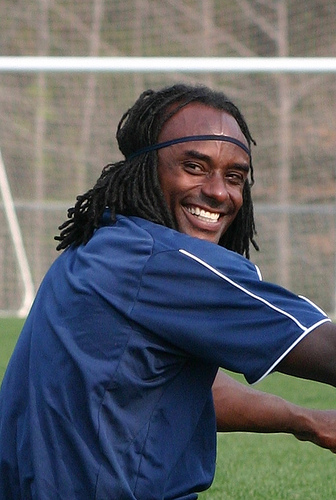

Personal information
- Full name: Mark Jonas
- Date of birth: October 17, 1974 (age 52)
- Place of birth: Washington, D.C., United States
- Height: 5 ft 8 in (1.73 m)
- Position: Midfielder

College career
Years	Team	Apps	(Gls)
1992–1995	NC State Wolfpack		

Senior career*
Years	Team	Apps	(Gls)
1996–1997	Cleveland Crunch (indoor)	8	(1)
1999	Richmond Kickers	24	(2)
1999–2000	Philadelphia KiXX (indoor)	1	(0)
2000	Carolina Dynamo	6	(1)
2003	San Diego Arsenal		
2004–2006	Virginia Beach Mariners	20	(0)
2007	Carolina RailHawks	5	(0)

International career
1991	United States	1	(0)
- * Club domestic league appearances and goals

Mark Jonas (born October 17, 1974) is an American soccer midfielder who had a twelve-year professional career in the U.S. indoor and lower division outdoor leagues. He earned one cap with the U.S. national team in 1991.

== Early life ==
Jonas was born on October 17, 1974, in Washington D.C. He attended Bowie High School where he played on the boys' soccer team. In his senior year, Bowie won the Maryland 4A championship and Jonas was named the All Met Player of the Year having scored 22 goals in addition to 9 assists. He then attended North Carolina State University where he played on the men's soccer team from 1992 to 1995.

== Professional ==
In 1996, Jonas traveled to London in hopes of joining an English club, helped by the fact that, as the holder of a British passport, work permit issues were not an obstacle. He was offered a trial with Wigan Athletic F.C. (then in the third of the four English divisions), which he declined, hoping to start his professional career in a higher division.

At some point during the 1996–1997 National Professional Soccer League (NPSL) season, Jonas played eight games for the Cleveland Crunch. In 1999, he played for the Richmond Kickers in the USL A-League. During the 1999–2000 NPSL season, he played on game for the Philadelphia KiXX. In the summer of 2000, he played six games with the Carolina Dynamo of the Premier Development League. At some point he moved to San Diego, California where he spent the end of the 2002–2003 season with the San Diego Arsenal of the San Diego County Soccer League. In 2004, he signed with the Virginia Beach Mariners and played with them until they folded following the 2006 USL First Division season. He then moved to the expansion Carolina RailHawks for 2007. He retired at the end of the season, having played five league games.

== National team ==
Jonas entered the national team program when he was selected for the U.S. U-17 national team which competed at the 1991 FIFA U-17 World Championship. The U.S. went 3–0 in group play, only to fall to Qatar in the second round.

On September 14, 1991, Jonas became one of three teenage players to earn a cap in the same game when he came on for Sadri Gjonbalaj in a 1–0 win over Jamaica. At the time he was sixteen years, eleven months old. The other two teenagers in that game were Mike Slivinski, who was a month younger than Jonas, and Nelson Vargas.

== Coaching ==
In addition to his extensive playing resume, Jonas is Director of Player Development and coaches soccer at Wake Futbol Club in Holly Springs, NC. He manages and runs Route10 Futbol which contains a vast majority of Wake FC, NCFC Youth and other local club players.

Jonas also coached NCFC Youth (formerly Capital Area Soccer League) the U13 Boys Academy Junior squad to a 2016 National Championship.
