= Eddy Baggio =

Italian football manager (born 1974)

Personal information
- Date of birth: 23 August 1974 (age 52)
- Place of birth: Caldogno, Italy
- Height: 1.79 m (5 ft 10 in)
- Positions: Forward; midfielder

Youth career
- 1992–1994: Fiorentina

Senior career*
Years	Team	Apps	(Gls)
1994–1995	Palazzolo	27	(6)
1995	Prato	6	(0)
1995–1998	Giorgione	89	(31)
1998–1999	Ancona	32	(11)
1999–2000	Ascoli	27	(22)
2000–2001	Ancona	26	(7)
2001–2002	Catania	28	(18)
2002–2003	Salernitana	27	(6)
2003–2004	Vicenza	22	(3)
2004	Catania	11	(2)
2005	Spezia	15	(5)
2005–2008	Pisa	21	(11)
2008	Portosummaga	5	(0)
2008–2009	Sangiovannese	31	(4)
Total		367	(126)

International career
1991	Italy U-17	2	(0)
- * Club domestic league appearances and goals

Eddy Baggio (born 23 August 1974) is an Italian football manager and former player who played as a striker.

== Early life ==
Born in Caldogno, Italy, in the province of Vicenza, Veneto, he is the youngest of the eight children of Matilde and Fiorindo Baggio. Eddy is also the younger brother of the legendary Italian footballer Roberto Baggio, who played as a second striker for Italy, but unlike Roberto, Eddy never made his Serie A debut. Like several of his siblings, Eddy was named after a famous athlete, in his case the Belgian cyclist Eddy Merckx, whilst his older brother Roberto was named after two of his father's Italian footballing idols, Roberto Boninsegna and Roberto Bettega. Neither of the brothers are related to the former Italian defensive midfielder Dino Baggio.

== Club career ==
Baggio started his youth and professional career at A.C. Fiorentina in 1991, the club where his older brother Roberto started to shine, and he was eventually promoted to the first team during the 1993–94 season, in Serie B.

He left the club 4 years after Roberto, and joined two different Serie C1 teams within two years: first Palazzolo, and later Prato in 1995. With Palazzolo, he scored on his professional debut, which came on 28 August 1994, in a 1–1 away draw against Bologna, on the opening match-day of the 1994–95 Serie C1 season. Baggio then joined Serie C2 team Giorgione in November 1995, and played there for 3 years, reaching the semi-finals of the Serie C1 promotion play-offs during the 1996–97 season. He then joined A.C. Ancona and Ascoli Calcio 1898, who were competing in Serie C1 at that time, scoring 11 goals in 32 appearances for the former side.

He returned to Ancona in 2000 and made his Serie B debut during the 2000–01 Serie B season. In the following years, he changed club every season: Calcio Catania (Serie C1), Salernitana Calcio 1919 (Serie B), home-town club Vicenza Calcio (Serie B), Catania again (Serie B), Spezia Calcio 1906 (Serie C1), and he finally settled in Pisa. With Salernitana, on 15 December 2002, he scored his 100th professional goal in a 2–2 home draw against Serie B league leaders Triestina from a penalty; his brother Roberto scored his 300th professional goal on the same day (their father's birthday), also from a penalty. In January 2008 he was sold to Serie C2 club Portosummaga, but managed to play only five times. In August 2008 he accepted an offer from Sangiovannese.

In total, he played 86 Serie B games, scoring 18 goals; throughout his career, he scored 130 goals in all competitions, including Serie B, Serie C1 & C2, the Coppa Italia, and the Coppa Italia Serie C, although he never played in Serie A.

== International career ==
Baggio was called up to the Italy Under-17 side three times in 1991, and represented the team on two occasions. He was a member of the Italy team that took part at the 1991 Under-17 World Championship.

== Managerial career ==
From August 2011, he coached one of the Pisa "Allievi" youth formations. From the 2012–13 season, he became a coach for the Fiorentina youth side, coaching Fiorentina's Allievi Lega Pro. During the 2013–14 season, he was promoted to coach the Giovanissimi nazionali.

== Honours ==
Spezia

- Coppa Italia Serie C: 2004–05
