= Carlos Castro (footballer, born 1974) =

Spanish retired footballer

Personal information
- Full name: Carlos Antonio Castro Caputo
- Date of birth: 17 December 1974 (age 51)
- Place of birth: Seville, Spain
- Height: 1.68 m (5 ft 6 in)
- Position: Right back

Team information
- Current team: Sporting Gijón (assistant)

Youth career
- Sevilla

Senior career*
Years	Team	Apps	(Gls)
1992–1995	Sevilla B	12	(0)
1995–1998	Ceuta		
1998–1999	Universidad LP	32	(1)
1999–2006	Hércules	219	(7)
2006–2008	Villajoyosa	55	(1)
2008	Jove Español	0	(0)
Total		318	(9)

International career
1990–1991	Spain U16	18	(0)
1991	Spain U17	11	(0)
1991–1993	Spain U18	16	(0)
1992	Spain U19	5	(0)
1993	Spain U20	2	(0)

Managerial career
- 2008–2009: Alicante (assistant)
- 2017–2019: Espanyol B (assistant)
- 2019: Espanyol (assistant)
- 2020–: Sporting Gijón (assistant)
Medal record
Men's football
Representing Spain
FIFA World U-17
Runner-up	1991 Italy
UEFA Euro U-16
Winner	1991 Switzerland
- * Club domestic league appearances and goals

Carlos Antonio Castro Caputo (born 17 December 1974) is a Spanish former footballer who played as a right back, and is the current assistant manager of Sporting de Gijón.

== Club career ==
Castro was born in Seville, Andalusia. Grown in the youth ranks of Sevilla FC, he never appeared officially for their first team, going on to resume his career almost exclusively in Segunda División B, mainly with Hércules CF. During his spell in the Valencian Community he was eventually awarded team captaincy, also being one of the most capped players in the club's history.

After having appeared in 32 matches – 31 starts – in the 2005–06 season to help Hércules retain its Segunda División status, Castro left the Estadio José Rico Pérez after a run-in with manager José Bordalás. He continued playing in the region until his retirement in November 2008 with Villajoyosa CF (third division) and FC Jove Español (amateurs), calling it quits after not being able to recover from an injury.

Castro served as assistant coach at Alicante CF in 2008–09, as the second-tier campaign ended in relegation and saw the side hire no fewer than four managers. He continued working with the organisation in directorial capacities, switching to Real Murcia in 2010 and returning to Hércules the following year.

Subsequently, Castro was part of David Gallego's staff at RCD Espanyol and Sporting de Gijón.

== International career ==
Castro represented Spain at the 1991 FIFA U-17 World Championship in Italy, playing all the games for the eventual runners-up.

== Honours ==
=== Club ===
Ceuta

- Tercera División: 1995–96, 1996–97

=== International ===
Spain U16

- UEFA European Under-16 Championship: 1991

Spain U17

- FIFA U-17 World Cup runner-up: 1991
