= Kaspar Anton von Baroni-Cavalcabo =

Italian Baroque painter

Kaspar Anton von Baroni-Cavalcabo (1682 in Sacco di Rovereto, County of Tyrol – 1759 in Rovereto, Count of Tyrol) or Gaspare Antonio Cavalcabò Baroni was a painter in a late Baroque period and style. During the greater part of his life he lived in Sacco, where he died. Many of his drawings are in the Library at Innsbruck.

== Biography ==
He initially studied with his cousin Giovanni Baroni, then moved to Verona to work under Antonio Balestra then after a spell in Venice, to Rome to work under Carlo Maratta. At the age of 26, after the death of his father, he returned to Rovereto, where he mainly painted religious canvases for the churches of Sacco, Trent, and Roveredo. Among his works are a San Francesco di Paola for the church of the Annuziata in Trento; paintings of Simon Stock, Elias and Eliseo for the church of the Carmine in Rovereto, a Cenacolo for the church of Lauretana, frescoes for a church in Sacco di Rovereto, and also for the Villa Lagarinea, where he painted the Stairway of Jacob. Filippo De Boni describes him as having all the defects of Balestra with none of the talents, yet has a fame of a good painter.

== Bibliography ==
- Bryan, Michael (1886). Robert Edmund Graves (ed.). Dictionary of Painters and Engravers, Biographical and Critical. Vol. I: A-K. London: George Bell and Sons. pp. 84–85.
