= 1991 South American U-17 Championship =

Campeonato Sudamericano Sub-17 Paraguay 1991

Tournament details
- Host country: Paraguay
- City: Asunción (Final stage)
- Dates: 4–19 May
- Teams: 10 (from 1 confederation)
- Venue: 3 (in 3 host cities)

Final positions
- Champions: Brazil (2nd title)
- Runners-up: Uruguay
- Third place: Argentina
- Fourth place: Chile

Tournament statistics
- Matches played: 26
- Goals scored: 86 (3.31 per match)
- Top scorer: (Uruguay) Diego Peréz (9 goals)

The 1991 South American Under-17 Football Championship (Spanish: Campeonato Sudamericano Sub-17 Paraguay 1991, Brazilian Portuguese: Campeonato Sul-Americano Sub-17 Paraguai 1991) was the fourth edition of the South American Under-17 Football Championship, a football competition for the under-17 national teams in South America organized by CONMEBOL. It was held in Paraguay from 4 to 19 May 1991.

Brazil were crowned champions, and together with Argentina and Uruguay, which were the top three teams of this tournament, qualified for the 1991 FIFA U-17 World Championship in Italy.

== Teams ==
- Argentina
- Bolivia
- Brazil (title holders)
- Chile
- Colombia
- Ecuador
- Paraguay (hosts)
- Peru
- Uruguay
- Venezuela

== Match officials ==
The referees were:

- (Argentina) Juan Carlos Crespi
- (Bolivia) Pablo Peña
- (Brazil) Ulises Tavares
- (Chile) Iván Guerrero
- (Chile) Carlos Robles
- (Colombia) Jorge Zuluaga
- (Ecuador) Milton Villavicencio
- (Paraguay) Sabino Fariña
- (Peru) Fernando Chappel
- (Uruguay) Fernando Cardellino
- (Uruguay) Jorge Nieto
- (Venezuela) Nelson Rodriguez

== Venues ==
The main venue was Estadio Defensores del Chaco, Asunción with some games being played at Estadio Manuel Ferreira and Estadio General Pablo Rojas in the same city. Estadio Juan Canuto Pettengill, Itauguá and Estadio Feliciano Cáceres, Luque were also used.

Asunción			Itauguá	Luque
Estadio Defensores del Chaco	Estadio Manuel Ferreira	Estadio General Pablo Rojas	Estadio Juan Canuto Pettengill	Estadio Feliciano Cáceres
25.292072°S 57.657381°W	25.291389°S 57.608611°W	25.3°S 57.6375°W	25.395917°S 57.340694°W	25.272222°S 57.493056°W
Capacity:50,000	Capacity:23,732	Capacity:45,000	Capacity:10,000	Capacity:26,974

== First stage ==
The top two teams in each group advanced to the final stage.

Tiebreakers

When teams finished level of points, the final rankings were determined according to:

1. goal difference
2. goals scored
3. head-to-head result between tied teams (two teams only)
4. drawing of lots

All times local, PAT (UTC−4).

=== Group A ===
Pos	Team	Pld	W	D	L	GF	GA	GD	Pts	Qualification
1	Argentina	4	3	1	0	7	4	+3	7	Final stage
2	Chile	4	2	1	1	5	2	+3	5	Final stage
3	Paraguay	4	1	3	0	6	4	+2	5	
4	Peru	4	1	1	2	7	7	0	3	
5	Venezuela	4	0	0	4	0	8	−8	0	

Source: Estadisticas de Fútbol
4 May 1991

Argentina	2–1	Chile
Alonso 24'; Bernuncio 63'	Report	Robles 46' (pen.)

Estadio Defensores del Chaco, Asunción
Referee: Ulises Tavares (Brazil)
4 May 1991

Peru	2–2	Paraguay
Chévez 12'; Quimper 39'	Report	Yugovich 21'; Escobar 61'

Estadio Defensores del Chaco, Asunción
Referee: Fernando Cardellino (Uruguay)

6 May 1991

Chile	3–0	Peru
Silva 10'; Reyes 68'; Mella 79'	Report

Estadio Defensores del Chaco, Asunción
Referee: Jorge Zuluaga (Colombia)
6 May 1991

Paraguay	2–0	Venezuela
Coronel 37'; Yugovich 39'	Report

Estadio Defensores del Chaco, Asunción
Referee: Pablo Peña (Bolivia)

8 May 1991

Chile	1–0	Venezuela
Tissavak 45'	Report

Estadio Feliciano Cáceres, Asunción
Referee: Milton Villavicencio (Ecuador)
8 May 1991

Argentina	2–1	Peru
Olivieri 49', 66'	Report	Colina 13'

Estadio Defensores del Chaco, Asunción
Referee: Jorge Nieto (Uruguay)

10 May 1991

Paraguay	0–0	Chile
	Report

Estadio Defensores del Chaco, Asunción
Referee: Jorge Nieves (Uruguay)
10 May 1991

Argentina	1–0	Venezuela
Akselman 44'	Report

Estadio Defensores del Chaco, Asunción
Referee: Fernando Cardellino (Uruguay)

12 May 1991

Peru	4–0	Venezuela
Solano 32'; Chévez 35'; Cominges 58'; Vásquez 59'	Report

Estadio Defensores del Chaco, Asunción
Referee: Pablo Peña (Bolivia)
12 May 1991

Argentina	2–2	Paraguay
Gallardo 14'; Castellani 31' (pen.)	Report	Caffarena 53', 62'

Estadio Defensores del Chaco, Asunción
Referee: Ulises Tavares (Brazil)

=== Group B ===
Pos	Team	Pld	W	D	L	GF	GA	GD	Pts	Qualification
1	Uruguay	4	2	2	0	16	1	+15	6	Final stage
2	Brazil	4	3	0	1	14	3	+11	6	Final stage
3	Colombia	4	2	1	1	10	4	+6	5	
4	Ecuador	4	1	1	2	9	8	+1	3	
5	Bolivia	4	0	0	4	0	33	−33	0	

Source: Estadisticas de Fútbol
5 May 1991

Colombia	8–0	Bolivia
Niño 14' (pen.); Nieto 14'; Sáez 22'; Pacheco 37', 51', 56', 71'; Betancourt 74' (pen.)	Report

Estadio Manuel Ferreira, Asunción
Referee: Sabino Fariña (Paraguay)
5 May 1991

Brazil	5–2	Ecuador
Gian 8', 38', 51', 78'; Leandro 66'	Report	Yáñez 14'; Hurtado 44'

Estadio Defensores del Chaco, Asunción
Referee: Juan Carlos Crespi (Argentina)

7 May 1991

Colombia	2–1	Ecuador
Betancourt 16'; Vásquez 77'	Report	Caicedo 32'

Estadio Juan Canuto Pettengill, Itauguá
Referee: Iván Guerrero (Chile)
7 May 1991

Uruguay	14–0	Bolivia
Goñi 5', 18', 27', 37', 51', 53'; López 7', 43', 58', 61', 74', 78' (pen.); Correa 35', 68'	Report

Estadio Manuel Ferreira, Asunción
Referee: Carlos Robles (Chile)

9 May 1991

Brazil	6–0	Bolivia
Adriano 29', 77', 79'; Leandro 55'; Yan 38'; Elenilson 73'	Report

Estadio General Pablo Rojas, Asunción
Referee: Fernando Chappell (Peru)
9 May 1991

Colombia	0–0	Uruguay
	Report

Estadio General Pablo Rojas, Asunción
Referee: Sabino Fariña (Paraguay)

13 May 1991

Ecuador	5–0	Bolivia
Delgado 8', 37'; Hurtado 33', 60'; Chalá 42'	Report

Estadio Defensores del Chaco, Asunción
Referee: Nelson Rodriguez (Venezuela)
13 May 1991

Uruguay	1–0	Brazil
Pérez 37'	Report

Estadio Defensores del Chaco, Asunción
Referee: Juan Carlos Crespi (Argentina)

13 May 1991

Uruguay	1–1	Ecuador
Delgado 22'	Report	Yáñez 70'

Estadio Defensores del Chaco, Asunción
Referee: Carlos Robles (Chile)
13 May 1991

Brazil	3–0	Colombia
Adriano 15'; Gian 20'; Leandro 56'	Report

Estadio Defensores del Chaco, Asunción
Referee: Sabino Fariña (Paraguay)

== Final stage ==
When teams finished level of points, the final rankings were determined according to the same criteria as the first stage, taking into account only matches in the final stage.

Pos	Team	Pld	W	D	L	GF	GA	GD	Pts	Qualification
1	Brazil	3	2	0	1	4	3	+1	4	1991 FIFA U-17 World Championship
2	Argentina	3	1	1	1	3	3	0	3	1991 FIFA U-17 World Championship
3	Uruguay	3	1	1	1	3	3	0	3	1991 FIFA U-17 World Championship
4	Chile	3	0	2	1	2	3	−1	2	

Source: Estadisticas de Fútbol
15 May 1991

Brazil	2–1	Argentina
Leandro 47'; Elenilson 73'	Report	Bernuncio 3'

Estadio Defensores del Chaco, Asunción
Referee: Sabino Fariña (Paraguay)
15 May 1991

Uruguay	1–1	Chile
Pérez 15'	Report	Salas 50'

Estadio Defensores del Chaco, Asunción
Referee: Jorge Zuluaga (Colombia)

17 May 1991

Argentina	0–0	Chile
	Report

Estadio Defensores del Chaco, Asunción
Referee: Milton Villavicencio (Ecuador)
17 May 1991

Uruguay	1–0	Brazil
Pérez 14'	Report

Estadio Defensores del Chaco, Asunción
Referee: Fernando Chappell (Peru)

19 May 1991

Brazil	2–1	Chile
Adriano 11', 75'	Report	Salas 36'

Estadio Defensores del Chaco, Asunción
Referee: Sabino Fariña (Paraguay)
19 May 1991

Argentina	2–1	Uruguay
Castellani 38' (pen.); Oliveri 72'	Report	Pérez 24'
Penalties
	0–3

Estadio Defensores del Chaco, Asunción
Referee: Milton Villavicencio (Ecuador)

== Winners ==
1991 South American Under-16 Football champions

Brazil
2nd title

== Goalscorers ==
There were 86 goals scored in 26 matches, for an average of 3.31 goals per match.

9 goals

- (Uruguay) Diego Peréz

6 goals

- (Brazil) Adriano
- (Uruguay) Diego Goñi

5 goals

- (Brazil) Gian

4 goals

- (Brazil) Leandro
- (Colombia) Victor Pacheco

3 goals

- (Argentina) Luciano Oliveri
- (Ecuador) Iván Hurtado

2 goals

- (Argentina) Rubén Bernuncio
- (Argentina) Ricardo Castellani
- (Brazil) Elenilson
- (Chile) Marcelo Salas
- (Colombia) Arley Betancourt
- (Ecuador) Carlos Yáñez
- (Ecuador) Agustin Delgado
- (Paraguay) Paulo Yugovic
- (Paraguay) Roberto Caffarena
- (Peru) David Chévez
- (Uruguay) Néstor Correa

1 goal

- (Argentina) Norberto Alonso
- (Argentina) Christian Akselman
- (Argentina) Marcelo Gallardo
- (Brazil) Yan
- (Chile) Ricardo Robles
- (Chile) Juan Silva
- (Chile) David Reyes
- (Chile) Victor Mella
- (Chile) Daniel Tissavak
- (Colombia) Henry Nieto
- (Colombia) John Sáez
- (Colombia) Henry Vásquez
- (Ecuador) Alí Chalá
- (Ecuador) Marcos Caicedo
- (Paraguay) Pánfilo Escobar
- (Paraguay) Néstor Coronel
- (Peru) Nolberto Solano
- (Peru) Ricardo Quimper
- (Peru) Elmer Colina
- (Peru) Paul Cominges
- (Peru) Jair Vásquez
- (Uruguay) Diego Luis López
- (Uruguay) Javier Delgado

Source: Estadisticas de Fútbol

== Qualified teams for FIFA U-17 World Championship ==
The following three teams from CONMEBOL qualified for the 1991 FIFA U-17 World Championship.

Team	Qualified on	Previous appearances in tournament^{1}
Uruguay	17 May 1991	0
Brazil	19 May 1991	3 (1985, 1987, 1989)
Argentina	19 May 1991	2 (1985, 1989)
