= Nestor Correa =

Uruguayan footballer (born 1974)

Personal information
- Full name: Nestor Fabian Correa
- Date of birth: August 23, 1974 (age 52)
- Place of birth: Uruguay
- Height: 1.72 m (5 ft 8 in)
- Position: Forward

Senior career*
Years	Team	Apps	(Gls)
?–2000	Liverpool	?	(?)
2000	→ Jeonbuk Hyundai Motors (loan)	22	(3)
2001–2002	C.D. FAS	?	(?)
2002	→ Jeonnam Dragons (loan)	15	(0)
2003–	?	?	(?)

International career
1991	Uruguay U-17	2	(0)
1993	Uruguay U-20	2	(0)
1997	Uruguay	?	(?)
- * Club domestic league appearances and goals

Nestor Fabian Correa, commonly Nestor Correa (born August 23, 1974) is a Uruguayan retired football player.

== Career ==
=== Club ===
He played Liverpool. and South Korean side Jeonbuk Hyundai Motors and Jeonnam Dragons.

=== International ===
He was squad of 1991 FIFA U-17 World Championship and 1993 FIFA World Youth Championship.
