= Alejandro Traversa =

Uruguayan footballer (born 1974)

Alejandro Pablo Traversa Machado (born 8 September 1974), commonly known as Alejandro Traversa, is a Uruguayan footballer who played as a defender.

== Club career ==
- (Uruguay) Defensor Sporting 1993–2002
- (Spain) Poli Ejido 2002–2003
- (Spain) Badajoz 2003–2006
- (Spain) Badalona 2006–2007
- (Spain) Premià 2007–2008
- (Uruguay) Defensor Sporting 2008–2010
- (Uruguay) El Tanque Sisley 2010–2012

== International career ==
Traversa played for the Uruguay under-17 team at the 1991 FIFA U-17 World Championship in Italy.

He also played with the Uruguay national under-20 football team at the 1993 FIFA World Youth Championship in Australia.
