= David Reyes (footballer, born 1974) =

Chilean footballer

Personal information
- Full name: David Andrés Reyes Hernández
- Date of birth: 8 December 1974 (age 51)
- Place of birth: Santiago, Chile
- Height: 1.68 m (5 ft 6 in)
- Position: Midfielder

Team information
- Current team: Coquimbo Unido (assistant)

Youth career
- 1990–1993: Universidad de Chile

Senior career*
Years	Team	Apps	(Gls)
1993–2001	Universidad de Chile	45	(2)
1995	→ Deportes Antofagasta (loan)	19	(1)
1997	→ O'Higgins (loan)	24	(1)
1998	→ Deportes Linares (loan)		(14)
1999	→ Unión Española (loan)	12	(1)
2002	Deportes Antofagasta		(6)
2003–2004	Deportes Puerto Montt	48	(10)
2004	Palestino	17	(4)
2005	Rangers	29	(3)
2006	Unión San Felipe	29	(8)
2007	Curicó Unido	37	(3)
2008	Deportes Copiapó	39	(2)

International career
1991	Chile U17	7	(1)

Managerial career
- 2016–2019: Chile U17 (assistant)
- 2019: Universidad de Chile (youth)
- 2019–2020: Universidad de Chile (assistant)
- 2021–2023: Chile U17 (assistant)
- 2023: Ñublense (assistant)
- 2024–2025: Deportes Copiapó (assistant)
- 2026–: Coquimbo Unido (assistant)
- * Club domestic league appearances and goals

David Andrés Reyes Hernández (born 8 December 1974) is a Chilean former footballer who played as a midfielder. He is the current assistant coach of Hernán Caputto for Coquimbo Unido.

== Club career ==
A product of Universidad de Chile, Reyes made his professional debut in 1993. With them, he won the Chilean Primera División league title in 1994 and 2000. He left them in 2001.

Renowned as a talented midfielder, Reyes developed all his career in his homeland. Besides Universidad de Chile, he played for Deportes Antofagasta, O'Higgins, Deportes Linares, Unión Española, Deportes Puerto Montt, Palestino, Rangers de Talca, Unión San Felipe, Curicó Unido and Deportes Copiapó.

== International career ==
Reyes represented Chile U17 in the 1991 South American Championship.

== Coaching career ==
Reyes has served as an assistant coach of Hernán Caputto for Chile U17, Universidad de Chile, Ñublense, Deportes Copiapó and Coquimbo Unido.

== Honours ==
=== Player ===
Universidad de Chile

- Chilean Primera División (2): 1994, 2000

Unión Española

- Primera B de Chile (1): 1999

=== Assistant coach ===
Coquimbo Unido

- Supercopa de Chile (1): 2026
- Copa de La Liga (1): 2026
