= Nelson Vargas =

American soccer player and coach

Personal information
- Full name: Nelson Edgar Vargas
- Date of birth: August 6, 1974 (age 52)
- Place of birth: Holyoke, Massachusetts, U.S.
- Height: 5 ft 7 in (1.70 m)
- Position: Forward

Youth career
- Standard Liège

Senior career*
Years	Team	Apps	(Gls)
1996–1997	Tampa Bay Mutiny	30	(3)
1998–2000	Miami Fusion	54	(2)

International career
- United States U17
- United States U20
1991–1994	United States	4	(0)

Managerial career
- 2018–2019: Miami FC (assistant)
- 2020: Miami FC
- 2020: Miami FC (assistant)
- * Club domestic league appearances and goals

Nelson Vargas (born August 6, 1974) is an American former soccer player and coach. Vargas spent five seasons in Major League Soccer and earned four caps with the United States men's national soccer team. He was also a member of the U.S. soccer team at the 1996 Summer Olympics.

== Soccer ==
=== Youth ===
Vargas attended Miami Coral Park High School and played youth soccer with Inter Juventus in Miami. After high school, he chose to forgo college and moved to Europe to train with Valencienne in France and Sporting Club of Portugal. He signed his first professional contract at the age of 16 to play for Standard Liège in Belgium.

=== Professional ===
The Tampa Bay Mutiny selected Vargas in the twelfth round (117th overall) in the 1996 MLS Inaugural Player Draft. He spent two seasons with the Mutiny before the Miami Fusion selected Vargas in the 1997 MLS Expansion Draft. On July 25, 2000, while playing in an Open Cup game in Saginaw, Michigan, Vargas sustained a right ankle sprain that turned out to be a career-ending injury. After three seasons in Miami, the Fusion waived Vargas in November 2000.

=== International ===
In 1991, Vargas was a member of the United States men's national under-17 soccer team at the U-17 World Youth Championship which went 3–0 in the first round. In the second round, the team tied Qatar 1–1 in regulation only to fall 5–4 in penalty kicks.

That same year, he earned his first of four caps with the U.S. national team when he came on at half time for Mike Slivinski in a September 14 win over Jamaica. At the time, Slivinski was the youngest U.S. player to earn a cap and Vargas was only three months older. Vargas did not play again with the senior national team until November 19, 1994, in a loss to Trinidad and Tobago. He then played two more games that year, his last coming on December 11.

In 1993, Vargas was selected for the U.S. team which qualified for the 1993 U-20 World Cup to be held in Australia. He scored two goal in the CONCACAF qualifying games. At the World Cup, the U.S. went 1-1-1 in group play, qualifying for the second round where it fell to Brazil.

In 1996, U.S. coach Bruce Arena named Vargas to the U.S. soccer team at the 1996 Summer Olympics. Once again, the team went 1–1–1, but this time failed to make the second round.

== Acting ==
In 2005, Vargas played the part of John Souza in The Game of Their Lives, a movie about the U.S. victory over England in the 1950 FIFA World Cup. He also starred in a Powerade and Allsport commercial that also featured Alexi Lalas.
