= Gerardo García León =

Spanish footballer and manager

Gerardo
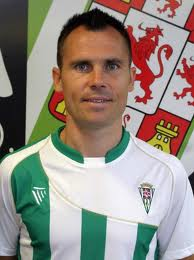
- Gerardo with Córdoba in 2012

Personal information
- Full name: Gerardo García León
- Date of birth: 7 December 1974 (age 51)
- Place of birth: Seville, Spain
- Height: 1.74 m (5 ft 8 1/2 in)
- Position: Right-back

Youth career
- AD Loyola
- Osasuna
- Real Madrid

Senior career*
Years	Team	Apps	(Gls)
1992–1995	Real Madrid B	55	(6)
1993–1994	Real Madrid C	7	(0)
1995–1996	Leganés	36	(4)
1996–1997	Lleida	28	(2)
1997–1998	Badajoz	38	(3)
1998–1999	Villarreal	45	(3)
2000–2001	Valencia	10	(0)
2000–2001	→ Osasuna (loan)	10	(2)
2001–2006	Málaga	156	(5)
2006–2009	Real Sociedad	96	(3)
2009–2011	Córdoba	46	(0)
2011–2013	Logroñés	48	(4)
Total		575	(32)

International career
1991	Spain U16	6	(0)
1991	Spain U17	11	(1)
1991–1993	Spain U18	21	(7)
1992	Spain U19	6	(0)
1997	Spain U23	3	(0)

Managerial career
- 2019–2024: Logroño (women)
Medal record
Men's football
Representing Spain
FIFA World U-17
Runner-up	1991 Italy
UEFA Euro U-16
Winner	1991 Switzerland
- * Club domestic league appearances and goals

Gerardo García León (born 7 December 1974), known simply as Gerardo, is a Spanish former professional footballer, currently a manager. He mainly played as a right-back.

During his extensive professional career he played for ten different clubs, all in his country, after emerging through Real Madrid's youth system. He amassed La Liga totals of 240 games and nine goals mainly in representation of Málaga (five seasons), adding 280 matches and 19 goals in the Segunda División.

== Playing career ==
Born in Seville, Andalusia, Gerardo was an unsuccessful Real Madrid graduate – he never appeared for the first team – and started playing professionally in the Segunda División, with CD Leganés, UE Lleida and CD Badajoz. He made his La Liga debut in 1998–99, playing 34 matches for Villarreal CF who were relegated at the season's end.

Having started 1999–2000 in the second division, Gerardo was transferred to Valencia CF in January 2000, featuring scarcely for the side during the campaign but being a starter in the 3–0 loss against Real Madrid in the final of the UEFA Champions League. He spent 2000–01 on loan to CA Osasuna, also in the top flight.

Gerardo experienced his most successful period at Málaga CF, spending five seasons at a team that had four consecutive mid-table positions and also helping them win the 2002 UEFA Intertoto Cup, scoring in the final to help defeat his former employers Villarreal. They finished last in 2005–06, with the player scoring twice from penalties in two 2–1 defeats.

For the 2006–07 season, Gerardo joined Real Sociedad on a two-year deal, being again relegated at the end of the campaign. He retained his place in the starting XI in his second and third years, totalling exactly 100 appearances.

Gerardo moved to Córdoba CF in the later hours of the August 2009 transfer window. After only 12 second-tier games in the 2010–11 season, the 36-year-old left after his contract was not renewed and signed for SD Logroñés of Tercera División, retiring two years later.

== Coaching career ==
After retiring, Gerardo founded the 'Gerardo García León Tiki-taka Football Academy' and also acted as youth coach for amateurs Comillas CF. On 12 June 2019, he was appointed manager of Primera División (women) team EDF Logroño.

== Personal life ==
Gerardo's two older brothers, Eduardo (born 1969) and Moisés, and younger Manuel (1978), were also footballers. The second, a forward, played nearly 600 games as a professional.

== Honours ==
Valencia

- UEFA Champions League runner-up: 1999–2000

Málaga

- UEFA Intertoto Cup: 2002

Spain U16

- UEFA European Under-16 Championship: 1991

Spain U17

- FIFA U-17 World Cup runner-up: 1991
