= Hugo Smaldone =

Argentine footballer and manager

Personal information
- Full name: Hugo Hector Smaldone
- Date of birth: January 24, 1968
- Place of birth: Argentina
- Position: Midfielder

Senior career*
Years	Team	Apps	(Gls)
?–?	?	?	
1993	→ Daewoo Royals (loan)	0	(0)

Managerial career
- 2004: San Telmo
- 2005: Deportivo Español
- 2008: Talleres (R.E.)
- 2008: Deportivo Armenio
- 2013–2015: Atlético Camioneros
- * Club domestic league appearances and goals

Hugo Smaldone (born 24 January 1968) is an Argentine football manager and former player.

== Club career ==
Smaldone played for Club Atlético San Telmo, Club Atletico Atlanta, Deportivo Armenio, Newell's Old Boys and Deportivo Español in his native Argentina. He also played for Busan IPark of the South Korean K League, then known as the Daewoo Royals. He was first Argentine player of K League with Rubén Bernuncio. He only appeared in League Cup (3 matches)

After he retired from playing, Smaldone became a football manager, leading lower-league clubs Deportivo Armenio, Deportivo Español, San Telmo, Talleres de Remedios de Escalada and Atlético Camioneros. He resigned as manager of San Telmo after winning only three of 19 Primera B Metropolitana matches during the 2004 Apertura tournament. Smaldone managed Deportivo Español in the Primera B Metropolitana during 2005. He managed Talleres (R.E.) until he was appointed to lead rival Primera B Metropolitana side Deportivo Armenio in November 2008.
