= Neguitão (footballer) =

Brazilian footballer

Personal information
- Full name: Carlos Roberto Camargo
- Date of birth: 1 May 1975 (age 51)
- Place of birth: São Paulo, Brazil
- Position: Right back

Youth career
- Novorizontino

Senior career*
Years	Team	Apps	(Gls)
1993	Novorizontino		
1994	São Paulo	4	(0)
1995	Novorizontino		
1995–1996	Inter de Limeira		
1997–1998	Novorizontino		
1999–2000	Prudentópolis		

International career
1991	Brazil U17		
- * Club domestic league appearances and goals as of 22 November 2023

Carlos Roberto Camargo (born 1 May 1975), better known as Neguitão, is a Brazilian former professional footballer who played as a right back.

== Career ==
Formed in the youth categories of GE Novorizontino, he played at the club for most of his career, until its dissolution in 1998. He also had a spell at São Paulo FC, Inter de Limeira and Prudentópolis EC, his last club.

He was the right back for the Brazil U17 team in 1991 South American U-17 Championship and 1991 FIFA U-17 World Championship.

== Honours ==
Brazil U17

- South American U-17 Championship: 1991
