= César Palacios (footballer, born 1974) =

Spanish former footballer (born 1974)

Personal information
- Full name: César Palacios Chocarro
- Date of birth: 19 October 1974 (age 52)
- Place of birth: Pamplona, Spain
- Height: 1.85 m (6 ft 1 in)
- Position: Midfielder

Youth career
- 1987–1993: Osasuna

Senior career*
Years	Team	Apps	(Gls)
1993–1995	Osasuna B	43	(11)
1994–2004	Osasuna	272	(31)
2004–2010	Numancia	197	(9)
Total		512	(51)

International career
1991	Spain U16	6	(0)
1991	Spain U17	6	(1)
1991–1993	Spain U18	19	(4)
1992	Spain U19	5	(0)
Medal record
Men's football
Representing Spain
FIFA World U-17
Runner-up	1991 Italy
UEFA Euro U-16
Winner	1991 Switzerland
- * Club domestic league appearances and goals

César Palacios Chocarro (born 19 October 1974) is a Spanish former professional footballer who played mainly as a central midfielder.

His career was solely associated with two clubs, Osasuna and Numancia, having captained the former a number of years. He appeared in 520 competitive matches across both major levels of Spanish football, amassing totals of 130 games and four goals in seven seasons in La Liga.

== Club career ==
A product of Osasuna's youth system, Palacios – born in Pamplona, Navarre – made his first-team debut on 6 April 1994 in a 1–0 home win against Tenerife, with the team eventually finishing the season in last position. He went on to become an important element of the squad in the following years, which included six Segunda División seasons; in 1999–2000, as they returned to La Liga after a six-year absence, he scored five goals in 40 matches, and also served as one of their captains.

For the 2004–05 campaign, Palacios joined Soria's Numancia, where he was an undisputed first-choice from the start, helping the side to return to the top flight in 2008. In late June 2010, after 52 league appearances over two seasons, 19 in the top tier in 2008–09, the 35-year-old retired from the game, becoming his last club's director of football.

== International career ==
Palacios represented Spain at various youth levels, but was never capped by the senior team. In 1991, he helped the under-17s to win the UEFA European Championship in Switzerland (then named under-16).

Three months later, Palacios played six matches in the category's FIFA U-17 World Cup, as the country finished in second position in Italy.

== Honours ==
Numancia

- Segunda División: 2007–08

Spain U16

- UEFA European Under-16 Championship: 1991

Spain U17

- FIFA U-17 World Cup runner-up: 1991
