= Daniel Tissavak =

Chilean footballer

Personal information
- Full name: Daniel Francisco Tissavak Véliz
- Date of birth: 9 May 1975 (age 51)
- Place of birth: Santiago, Chile
- Position: Midfielder

Youth career
- Universidad de Chile

Senior career*
Years	Team	Apps	(Gls)
- Universidad de Chile
- Deportes La Serena
1996	Unión Santa Cruz		
1997	San Luis		
1998	Unión La Calera		
- PSDS Deli Serdang
- Persma Manado
- PSMS Medan

International career
1991	Chile U17	7	(1)
- * Club domestic league appearances and goals

Daniel Francisco Tissavak Véliz (born 9 May 1975) is a Chilean former professional footballer who played as a midfielder for clubs in Chile and Indonesia.

== Club career ==
A playmaker, Tissavak is a product of Universidad de Chile youth system, where he coincided with Marcelo Salas as fellow and Manuel Rodríguez Vega as coach. In his homeland, he also played for Deportes La Serena, Unión Santa Cruz, San Luis. and Unión La Calera.

After he moved abroad and spent about four years in the Indonesian football, playing for PSDS Deli Serdang, Persma Manado and PSMS Medan.

== International career ==
Tissavak represented Chile at under-17 level in the 1991 South American Championship alongside well-known players such as Marcelo Salas, Clarence Acuña and Álex Varas. He scored the goal in the 1–0 win against Venezuela.

== Personal life ==
As a football player, he was compared to Diego Maradona by his resemblance and playing style.

Following his retirement as a player, he returned to his homeland and joined Gerdau Aza, a steel company, as a machine operator.
