= Ramón González (footballer, born 1974) =

Spanish footballer

Personal information
- Full name: Ramón González Expósito
- Date of birth: 25 November 1974 (age 51)
- Place of birth: Malagón, Spain
- Height: 1.81 m (5 ft 11 in)
- Position: Centre-back

Youth career
- Valladolid

Senior career*
| Years | Team | Apps | (Gls) |
| 1993–1997 | Valladolid | 70 | (0) |
| 1997–1999 | Atlético Madrid B | 59 | (6) |
| 1998–1999 | Atlético Madrid | 12 | (0) |
| 1999–2001 | Las Palmas | 48 | (1) |
| 2002–2004 | Córdoba | 88 | (9) |
| 2004–2006 | Recreativo | 58 | (4) |
| 2006–2007 | Murcia | 28 | (2) |
| 2007–2008 | Xerez | 4 | (1) |
| Total | | 367 | (23) |

International career
| 1991 | Spain U16 | 5 | (1) |
| 1991 | Spain U17 | 8 | (1) |
| 1992–1993 | Spain U18 | 15 | (1) |
| 1992 | Spain U19 | 6 | (0) |
| 1993–1995 | Spain U21 | 7 | (1) |

Managerial career
- 2013–2014: Cultural Leonesa (youth)
- 2014–2016: Cultural Leonesa (assistant)
- 2016–2021: Júpiter Leonés
- 2021: Cultural Leonesa
- 2023–2024: Atlético Bembibre
Medal record
Men's football
Representing Spain
UEFA Euro U-21
| Bronze medal – third place | 1994 France |
FIFA World U-17
| Runner-up | 1991 Italy |
UEFA Euro U-16
| Winner | 1991 Switzerland |
- * Club domestic league appearances and goals

Ramón González Expósito (born 25 November 1974), known simply as Ramón as a player, is a Spanish former professional footballer who played as a central defender, currently a manager.

== Club career ==
Ramón was born in Malagón, Province of Ciudad Real, Castilla–La Mancha. During his professional career he represented Real Valladolid, Atlético Madrid (first and second teams), UD Las Palmas, Córdoba CF, Recreativo de Huelva, Real Murcia CF and Xerez CD.

Most of Ramón's career was spent in the Segunda División, but he did play 101 La Liga matches, the first on 5 September 1993 when Valladolid lost 0–1 at home against Sporting de Gijón. He retired with Andalusia's Xerez at the end of the 2007–08 campaign in the second tier, where he totalled 266 games over ten seasons.

== International career ==
Ramón earned 41 caps for Spain across five youth levels, scoring four goals. He helped the under-17 side to finish second in the 1991 FIFA World Championship held in Italy.

== Honours ==
Las Palmas

- Segunda División: 1999–2000

Recreativo

- Segunda División: 2005–06

Spain U16

- UEFA European Under-16 Championship: 1991

Spain U17

- FIFA U-17 World Cup runner-up: 1991

Spain U21

- UEFA European Under-21 Championship third place: 1994
