= Antonio Robaina =

Spanish footballer

Toni Robaina
Personal information
- Full name: Antonio Segura Robaina
- Date of birth: 30 November 1974 (age 51)
- Place of birth: Las Palmas, Spain
- Height: 1.76 m (5 ft 9 1/2 in)
- Position: Midfielder

Youth career
- Las Palmas

Senior career*
Years	Team	Apps	(Gls)
1992–1995	Las Palmas	67	(17)
1995–2001	Tenerife	102	(4)
1999	→ Las Palmas (loan)	17	(1)
1999–2000	→ Sporting CP (loan)	3	(0)
2000–2001	→ Universidad LP (loan)	26	(0)
2001–2002	Ceuta	29	(2)
2002–2003	Pájara Playas	37	(4)
2003–2004	Universidad LP	29	(2)
2004–2005	Guijuelo	21	(2)
2005–2006	Castillo	26	(0)
2006–2008	Santa Brígida	28	(0)
2009	Breña Alta		
Total		385	(32)

International career
1991	Spain U16	5	(6)
1991	Spain U17	6	(4)
1992–1993	Spain U18	7	(3)
1993	Spain U21	1	(0)
1997	Spain U23	3	(0)
Medal record
Men's football
Representing Spain
FIFA World U-17
Runner-up	1991 Italy
UEFA Euro U-16
Winner	1991 Switzerland
- * Club domestic league appearances and goals

Antonio "Toni" Segura Robaina (born 30 November 1974) is a Spanish former professional footballer who played as a midfielder.

== Club career ==
Robaina was born in Las Palmas. After starting out at local club UD Las Palmas, playing mainly in the Segunda División B, the 20-year-old signed for CD Tenerife also in his native Canary Islands in 1995, immediately having an impact in La Liga by making 39 appearances and providing 17 assists as his team finished fifth and qualified for the UEFA Cup, also featuring regularly as they reached the latter competition's semi-finals.

After another average season, Robaina gradually fell out of favour with Tenerife and, in the 1999 January transfer window, returned to Las Palmas in the first of a series of loans. He spent 1999–2000 in Portugal with Sporting CP, totalling just ten minutes from three games as the Lisbon side claimed the Primeira Liga title. In the following campaign he played with another team in his native region, Universidad de Las Palmas CF, suffering relegation from Segunda División and being subsequently released by his main club, for which he appeared in 117 competitive matches.

From the age of 27 until his retirement eight years later, Robaina all but competed in the third tier of Spanish football, with one-year spells in the Tercera División and regional football; the majority of the sides hailed from the Canary Islands.

== Personal life ==
Robaina's son, also named Antonio, was also a footballer and a midfielder.

== Honours ==
Sporting CP

- Primeira Liga: 1999–2000

Spain U16

- UEFA European Under-16 Championship: 1991

Spain U17

- FIFA U-17 World Cup runner-up: 1991
