= Neguitão (sambist) =

- Born: Darly Silva
- Occupation: Sambist
- Years active: 2010–2019
- Known for: President of Vai-Vai

Darly Silva, better known as Neguitão is a Brazilian sambist, who presided over samba school GRES Vai-Vai from 2010 to 2019.

Neguitão gained relevance during the 2010s, mainly due to his performance on the day of evaluation of samba schools grades, when confusion occurred several times during the event.

During his administration, Vai-Vai won the 2011 (works of maestro João Carlos Martins) and 2015 (tribute to singer Elis Regina) carnivals.

== See also ==
- Carnival of São Paulo
