= Giovanni Baroni =

Argentine footballer (born 2009)

Personal information
- Full name: Giovanni Emir Baroni
- Date of birth: 21 January 2009 (age 17)
- Place of birth: Morteros, Argentina
- Height: 1.86 m (6 ft 1 in)
- Position: Midfielder

Team information
- Current team: Talleres
- Number: 10

Youth career
- 2016–2026: Talleres

Senior career*
Years	Team	Apps	(Gls)
2026–	Talleres	24	(0)

International career^{‡}
2025	Argentina U16	1	(0)
2026–	Argentina U17	5	(0)
- * Club domestic league appearances and goals as of 17:45, 15 November 2026 (UTC) ‡ National team caps and goals as of 17 April 2026

Giovanni Emir Baroni (born 21 January 2009) is an Argentine professional footballer who plays as a right winger or attacking midfielder for Argentine Primera División club Talleres.

== Club career ==
Born in Morteros, Córdoba Province, Baroni is a youth product of CA Talleres.

In February 2025, he signed his first professional contract with Talleres.

Baroni made his professional debut with Talleres in a 2–1 Argentine Primera División win over Newell's Old Boys on 23 January 2026, starting the game and already delivering his first assist for Ronaldo Martínez's opener.

Following his debut, he quickly became a regular with the first team, signing a contract extension in March 2026, until 2028. By then he had already several decisive contributions with Talleres, including his first goal, during a 2–0 Cup beating of Argentino de Merlo.

== International career ==
Baroni is a youth international for Argentina, having played for the under-16 and under-17.
