= Joachim Fickert =

German football coach and instructor

Personal information
- Place of birth: Rodleben, Germany

Managerial career
- Years: Team
- 1971–1979: SV Ellingen
- 1977–1980: Fußballverband Rheinland
- 1980–1981: TuS Neuendorf
- 1981–1983: SV Güllesheim⅝
- 1983: Rwanda
- Mauritania
- 1984–1988: Rwanda
- 1988–1990: Benin
- 1991–1995: Congo (including U17)
- 1995: Eritrea
- 1996–2003: Cambodia
- 2003–2004: An Giang F.C.
- 2006: Nagaworld FC
- 2007: Mali (technical adviser)
- 2008–2012: Mali (technical director)

Joachim Fickert is a German football coach and instructor who has coached in a myriad of countries. As an itinerant football coach, he has had experience in Germany, Rwanda, Mauritania, Benin, Congo, Eritrea, Cambodia, Togo, Laos, Vietnam, Mali, and Ethiopia and has the English, French, and Khmer languages listed on his CV.

== Career ==
=== Cambodia ===
Taking over the Cambodia national team as part of a development project in aid of the country by the German government, Fickert guided the Kouprey Blue to 4-0 and 3-1 group stage triumphs over Brunei and Myanmar at the 1997 Southeast Asian Games. Trusted by public to bring good results, he steered Cambodia to its highest-ever FIFA ranking, 162nd place, in 1998 and was in charge of the team for the 2002 FIFA World Cup qualifying campaign. Took the helm of the Cambodian League's Nagaworld in 2006 where they had two friendlies in Vietnam, which they were beaten 5-1 and 5-0 by Hoàng Anh Gia Lai's A and B teams.

=== Vietnam ===
Roped in by An Giang in December 2003 with two Cambodians, the German was dismissed from his post by mid-February 2004 following five games with unsatisfactory results.

=== Mali ===
Announced as Mali technical director in 2008, the German was tasked with making a system for work within the Malian Football Federation as well as overseeing the national selection. However, he soon was forced to leave the country in 2012 as rebels were closing in on the Malian capital, Bamako. Overall, he held seminars for over 1400 participants, got 44 coaches internships, and helped develop Malian grassroots football as a whole.

=== Ethiopia ===
Tasked to develop football in Ethiopia for four years in 2012 based on the German model as part of a project between Germany and Ethiopia, Fickert helped Ethiopian youngsters secure contracts with European clubs and has said that the main problem with African football is lack of funds, facilities, as well as medical care.
