= Rubén Bernuncio =

Argentine footballer

Personal information
- Full name: Rubén Alejandro Bernuncio Almaraz
- Date of birth: January 19, 1976
- Place of birth: Buenos Aires, Argentina
- Date of death: July 18, 1999 (aged 23)
- Position: Striker

Senior career*
Years	Team	Apps	(Gls)
1992–1993	San Lorenzo	18	(1)
1993–1994	→ Daewoo Royals (loan)	9	(1)
1994–1995	Mandiyú	25	(4)
1995	Argentinos Juniors	8	(2)
1996	San Lorenzo	11	(1)
- * Club domestic league appearances and goals

Rubén Bernuncio (born 19 January 1976 in Buenos Aires, died 18 July 1999) was an Argentine football striker who played for several clubs in Argentina, including San Lorenzo and Textil Mandiyú. In November 1996, Bernuncio was seriously injured in a motorcycle accident and later died in 1999 from kidney failure related to the injuries he sustained.

== Club career ==
He mainly played for clubs in Argentina. He also played for Busan IPark of the South Korean K League, then known as the Daewoo Royals. He was first Argentine player of K League with Hugo Smaldone

== International career ==
Bernuncio was part of the Argentina squad at the 1991 FIFA U-17 World Championship.

== Honours ==
=== Individual ===
- Korean League Cup Top Assists Award: 1993
