= Francis Makaya =

Congolese footballer

Personal information
- Full name: Francis Repin Makaya Tschitenbo
- Date of birth: 12 August 1975 (age 51)
- Place of birth: Congo
- Height: 1.72 m (5 ft 7 1/2 in)
- Position: Midfielder

Senior career*
Years	Team	Apps	(Gls)
1993–1996	Erzgebirge Aue	35	(2)
1996–1998	VfL Herzlake	6+	(0)
1998–2000	VfR Aalen	27	(1)
2000–2001	1. FC Schweinfurt 05		
2001–2002	SV Eckartsweier		
2001–2005	Bahlinger SC	55+	(2+)
2004–2005	FV Gamshurst		
2005–2006	Offenburger FV		
2006–2009	FV Gamshurst		
2009–2010	TuS Greffern		
Total		123+	(5+)

International career
1994–2000	Congo	5	(0)
- * Club domestic league appearances and goals

Francis Repin Makaya Tschitenbo (born 12 August 1975) is a Congolese former footballer who played as a midfielder. He represented the Congo national football team at the 2000 African Cup of Nations.
