= Goya Jaekel =

German footballer

Personal information
- Full name: Goya Jaekel
- Date of birth: 25 October 1974 (age 52)
- Height: 1.88 m (6 ft 2 in)
- Position: Striker

Youth career
- BFC Viktoria 1889

Senior career*
| Years | Team | Apps | (Gls) |
| –1994 | BFC Preussen | | |
| 1995 | Hertha BSC | 2 | (0) |
| 1995– | Kickers Emden | | |
| –1999 | SC Verl | | |
| 1999–2002 | Tennis Borussia Berlin | 12 | (2) |
| 2002–2004 | Tasmania-Gropiusstadt | | |
| 2004–2006 | VfB Concordia Britz | | |
| 2006–2008 | BFC Viktoria 1889 | | |
| 2008 | Prignitzer Kuckuck Kickers | 2 | (2) |

International career
| 1991 | Germany U-17 | 4 | (2) |
- * Club domestic league appearances and goals

Goya Jaekel (born 25 October 1974) is a former professional German football player.

== Playing career ==
Jaekel, a striker by trade, represented Germany at the 1991 FIFA U-17 World Championship, scoring two goals in four games before being knocked out in the quarter-finals by Spain.

He signed for Hertha BSC in 1995 after coming through the ranks of local Berliner teams BFC Viktoria 1889 and BFC Preussen. At the end of the 1994–95 2. Bundesliga season, he made two substitute appearances for Hertha at the Olympic Stadium. Following spells at Kickers Emden and SC Verl in the latter half of the 1990s, the forward signed for Tennis Borussia Berlin and made 12 appearances for the Veilchen in the Regionalliga-Nord. Jaekel later played for SV Tasmania-Gropiusstadt 1973 and VfB Concordia Britz before moving back to his youth team BFC Viktoria 1889 and saw out the twilight of his playing career in the Brandenburg-Liga for Prignitzer Kuckuck Kickers.
