= Juma Rashed =

Emirati footballer (born 1972)

Juma Rashid
Personal information
- Full name: Juma Rashid Al Holi
- Date of birth: 12 December 1972 (age 53)
- Place of birth: United Arab Emirates
- Position: Goalkeeper

Senior career*
Years	Team	Apps	(Gls)
1990–2006	Al Shabab AC		

International career
1992–2004	United Arab Emirates	28	(0)
- * Club domestic league appearances and goals

Juma Rashed (12 December 1972) is an Emirati football goalkeeper who played for United Arab Emirates in the 2004 AFC Asian Cup.
