= Argentina national under-17 football team =

National association football team

Argentina U-17
- Nickname(s): Albiceleste (The White and Sky Blue); Los Cebollitas (Little Onions); Los Pibes (The Kids)
- Association: Asociación del Fútbol Argentino (Argentine Football Association)
- Confederation: CONMEBOL (South American Football Confederation)
- Head coach: Diego Placente
- Captain: Ezequiel Báez
- Most caps: Rodolfo Arruabarrena, Javier Mascherano, Oscar Ustari
- Top scorer: Fernando Gatti, Hernán Peirone
- FIFA code: ARG
First colours	Second colours

Biggest defeat
- Nigeria 4–0 Argentina (Nagoya, Japan; 24 August 1993); Germany 4–0 Argentina (Chillan, Chile; 21 October 2015); Colombia 4–0 Argentina (Luque, Paraguay; 19 April 2026)

FIFA U-17 World Cup
- Appearances: 17 (first in 1985)
- Best result: Third place (1991, 1995, 2003)

South American U-17 Championship
- Appearances: 21 (first in 1985)
- Best result: Champions (1985, 2003, 2013, 2019)
Medal record
U-17 World Cup
Bronze medal – third place	1991 Italia	Team
Bronze medal – third place	1995 Ecuador	Team
Bronze medal – third place	2003 Finland	Team

The Argentina national under-17 football team is the representative of Argentina within all FIFA-sponsored tournaments that pertain to that age level.

Argentina has participated in 16 of the 20 FIFA U-17 World Cups, finishing in third place three times and fourth place twice. Argentina has also won the South American Under-17 Football Championship four times.

Many of Argentina's top players came through the ranks of the U-17 teams, including Emiliano Martínez, Fernando Redondo, Nestor Fabbri, Roberto Bonano, Juan Sebastián Verón, Roberto Abbondanzieri, Franco Costanzo, Leonardo Biagini, Luciano Galletti, Marcelo Gallardo, Esteban Cambiasso, Gabriel Milito, Ezequiel González, Aldo Duscher, Lucas Biglia, Eduardo Salvio, Maxi López, Rodolfo Arruabarrena, Javier Mascherano and Carlos Tevez.

== Competitive record ==
=== FIFA U-17 World Cup ===
Year	Round	Position	GP	W	D^{1}	L	GS	GA
(China) 1985	Group stage	9th	3	1	1	1	5	4
(Canada) 1987	Did not qualify							
(Scotland) 1989	Quarter-finals	8th	4	1	2	1	5	3
(Italy) 1991	Third place	3rd	6	2	2	2	5	5
(Japan) 1993	Group stage	9th	3	1	1	1	7	6
(Ecuador) 1995	Third place	3rd	6	5	0	1	12	4
(Egypt) 1997	Quarter-finals	6th	4	2	1	1	3	2
(New Zealand) 1999	Did not qualify							
(Trinidad and Tobago) 2001	Fourth place	4th	6	3	1	2	12	9
(Finland) 2003	Third place	3rd	6	4	1	1	10	4
(Peru) 2005	Did not qualify							
(South Korea) 2007	Quarter-finals	6th	5	2	2	1	7	4
(Nigeria) 2009	Round of 16	11th	4	2	0	2	6	6
(Mexico) 2011	Round of 16	13th	4	1	1	2	4	8
(United Arab Emirates) 2013	Fourth place	4th	7	4	1	2	13	12
(Chile) 2015	Group stage	24th	3	0	0	3	1	8
(India) 2017	Did not qualify							
(Brazil) 2019	Round of 16	9th	4	2	1	1	8	5
(Indonesia) 2023	Fourth place	4th	7	4	1	2	19	9
(Qatar) 2025	Round of 32	17th	4	3	1	0	13	4
(Qatar) 2026	In progress	TBD	1	0	0	1	0	2
Total:17/21	Third place	3rd	77	37	16	24	130	95

=== South American U-17 Championship ===
Year	Round	GP	W	D^{1}	L	GS	GA
(Argentina) 1985	Champions	8	8	0	0	32	5
(Peru) 1986	Fourth place	7	1	5	1	7	7
(Ecuador) 1988	Runners-up	7	6	0	1	13	4
(Paraguay) 1991	Third place	7	4	2	1	10	7
(Colombia) 1993	Third place	7	4	1	2	12	6
(Peru) 1995	Runners-up	6	4	1	1	12	4
(Paraguay) 1997	Runners-up	7	4	1	2	15	6
(Uruguay) 1999	Fourth place	6	2	2	2	9	9
(Peru) 2001	Runners-up	7	4	1	2	12	8
(Bolivia) 2003	Champions	7	4	3	0	19	5
(Venezuela) 2005	Group stage	4	1	1	2	6	7
(Ecuador) 2007	Third place	9	4	4	1	13	7
(Chile) 2009	Runners-up	5	3	2	0	10	4
(Ecuador) 2011	Third place	9	5	1	3	17	11
(Argentina) 2013	Champions	9	4	3	2	17	13
(Paraguay) 2015	Runners-up	9	4	2	3	14	9
(Chile) 2017	Group stage	4	1	0	3	3	4
(Peru) 2019	Champions	9	5	2	2	14	10
(Ecuador) 2023	Third place	9	5	2	2	15	8
(Colombia) 2025	Sixth place	6	3	1	2	16	7
(Paraguay) 2026	Runners-up	6	3	1	2	11	12
Total	21/21	148	79	35	34	277	153

^{1}Draws include knockout matches decided on penalty kicks.

== Honours ==
=== Competitive ===
- FIFA U-17 World Cup
  - (bronze) Third Place (3): 1991, 1995, 2003
- CONMEBOL Sub 17
  - (gold) Champions (4): 1985, 2003, 2013, 2019
  - (silver) Runners-up (7): 1988, 1995, 1997, 2001, 2009, 2015, 2026
  - (bronze) Third Place (5): 1991, 1993, 2007, 2011, 2023

== Players ==
=== Current squad ===
The following players were called up to the squad for the 2026 South American U-17 Championship between 3–19 April 2026 in Paraguay.

Caps and goals as of 19 April 2026, after the match against Colombia.

No.	Pos.	Player	Date of birth (age)	Caps	Goals	Club
1	GK	Valentin Reigia	30 September 2009 (age 17)	7	0	(Argentine Football Association) Argentinos Juniors
12	GK	Thiago Parga	24 March 2009 (age 17)	1	0	(Argentine Football Association) Huracán
23	GK	Facundo Ortellado	1 June 2009 (age 17)	1	0	(Argentine Football Association) Banfield
2	DF	Alvaro Güich	23 March 2009 (age 17)	7	0	(Argentine Football Association) Rosario Central
3	DF	Simón Escobar	17 July 2009 (age 17)	10	0	(Argentine Football Association) Vélez Sarsfield
4	DF	Thiago Pérez Ferreira	25 March 2009 (age 17)	7	0	(Argentine Football Association) Huracán
6	DF	Julio Coria	15 May 2009 (age 17)	6	0	(Argentine Football Association) Boca Juniors
13	DF	Mateo Mendizabal	14 September 2009 (age 17)	7	0	(Argentine Football Association) Banfield
14	DF	Benjamin Salinas	29 May 2009 (age 17)	1	0	(Argentine Football Association) Boca Juniors
16	DF	Felipe Echenique	10 March 2009 (age 17)	3	0	(Argentine Football Association) Lanús
17	DF	Alex Cardozo	16 January 2009 (age 17)	5	0	(Argentine Football Association) Lanús
5	MF	Matheo Machuca	26 January 2009 (age 17)	6	0	(Argentine Football Association) Independiente
8	MF	Marcos Ortíz	5 March 2009 (age 17)	6	0	(Argentine Football Association) Belgrano
10	MF	Giovanni Baroni	21 January 2009 (age 17)	6	0	(Argentine Football Association) Talleres
15	MF	Santino Mambrín	25 May 2009 (age 17)	5	0	(Argentine Football Association) Lanús
18	MF	Galo Escobar	8 December 2009 (age 16)	5	0	(Argentine Football Association) River Plate
20	MF	Thiago Domínguez	1 March 2009 (age 17)	4	1	(Argentine Football Association) Lanús
7	FW	Tobías Goytia	14 April 2009 (age 17)	6	2	(Argentine Football Association) River Plate
9	FW	Alan Alcaraz	11 July 2009 (age 17)	4	2	(Argentine Football Association) Argentinos Juniors
11	FW	Juan Cruz Policella	3 August 2009 (age 17)	8	3	(Argentine Football Association) Vélez Sarsfield
19	FW	Facundo Salinas	29 January 2009 (age 17)	6	2	(Argentine Football Association) Vélez Sarsfield
21	FW	Emiliano Barrionuevo	2 January 2009 (age 17)	6	2	(Argentine Football Association) Boca Juniors
22	FW	Benjamín Tapia	4 February 2009 (age 17)	4	1	(Argentine Football Association) Belgrano

=== Recent call-ups ===
The following players have also been called up to the squad within the last twelve months and remain eligible for selection.

Pos.	Player	Date of birth (age)	Caps	Goals	Club	Latest call-up

== See also ==
- Argentina national under-20 football team
- Argentina national under-15 football team
- Argentina Olympic football team
- Argentina national football team
- Argentina national futsal team
