= Carlos Macchi =

Uruguayan footballer (born 1974)

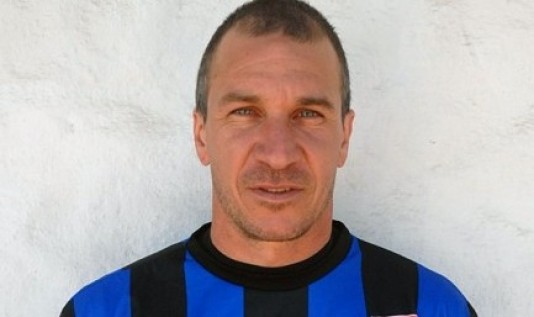
- Macchi in 2013

Personal information
- Full name: Carlos Germán Macchi Vacelaire
- Date of birth: 18 October 1974 (age 52)
- Place of birth: Montevideo, Uruguay
- Height: 1.85 m (6 ft 1 in)
- Position: Defensive midfielder

Team information
- Current team: Canadian

Youth career
- Peñarol

Senior career*
Years	Team	Apps	(Gls)
1995–1998	Peñarol		
1997	Liverpool Montevideo (loan)		
1999	Caracas		
1999	Rampla Juniors		
2000	Frontera Rivera		
2000	Rentistas		
2000	Real España		
2001–2002	Juventud Las Piedras		
2003	Alajuelense		
2003–2004	Rentistas		
2005–2006	Liverpool Montevideo		
2007	Rentistas		
2007	Miramar Misiones		
2008–2013	Liverpool Montevideo	88	(3)
2014–?	Canadian		

International career
1991	Uruguay U17		
- * Club domestic league appearances and goals

Carlos Germán Macchi Vacelaire (born 18 October 1974) is a Uruguayan former professional footballer who played as a defensive midfielder.
