= Elie Rock Malonga =

Congolese footballer

Personal information
- Date of birth: 21 September 1975 (age 51)
- Place of birth: Brazzaville, Congo
- Height: 1.78 m (5 ft 10 in)
- Position: Midfielder

Senior career*
Years	Team	Apps	(Gls)
- Club 57
1995–1996	SG Düren 99		
1996–1997	FC Bremerhaven		
1997–2000	BV Cloppenburg		
2001–2003	VfB Oldenburg	57	(0)
2003–2005	SV Concordia Ihrhove		
2005–2006	GVO Oldenburg		
2006	SSV Jeddeloh		
2006–2009	Blau-Weiß Ramsloh		
2009–2011	FC Sedelsberg		

International career
1995–2000	Congo	15	(0)
- * Club domestic league appearances and goals

Elie Rock Malonga (born 21 September 1975) is a Congolese former footballer. A midfielder, played in 15 matches for the Congo national team from 1995 to 2000. He was also named in Congo's squad for the 2000 African Cup of Nations tournament.
