= Christian Akselman =

Argentine footballer (born 1974)

Personal information
- Full name: Christian Javier Akselman
- Date of birth: 17 August 1974 (age 52)
- Place of birth: Buenos Aires, Argentina
- Position: Midfielder

Youth career
- Racing Club

Senior career*
Years	Team	Apps	(Gls)
1993–1995	Racing Club	22	(0)
1995–1996	Tigre	22	(0)
1997	Emelec	16	(0)
1997–1998	Almagro	28	(2)
1999	Unión Española		(1)
1999–2000	El Porvenir	7	(0)
2000–2005	Berazategui		

International career
1991	Argentina U17	12	(2)
- * Club domestic league appearances and goals

Christian Javier Akselman (born 17 August 1974 in Buenos Aires) is an Argentine former footballer who played for clubs of Argentina, Chile and Ecuador.

== Teams ==
- (Argentina) Racing Club 1993–1995
- (Argentina) Tigre 1995–1996
- (Ecuador) Emelec 1997
- (Argentina) Almagro 1997–1998
- (Chile) Unión Española 1999
- (Argentina) El Porvenir 1999–2000
- (Argentina) Berazategui 2000–2005
