= Emilio Carrasco Gutiérrez =

Mexican artist (1957–2020)

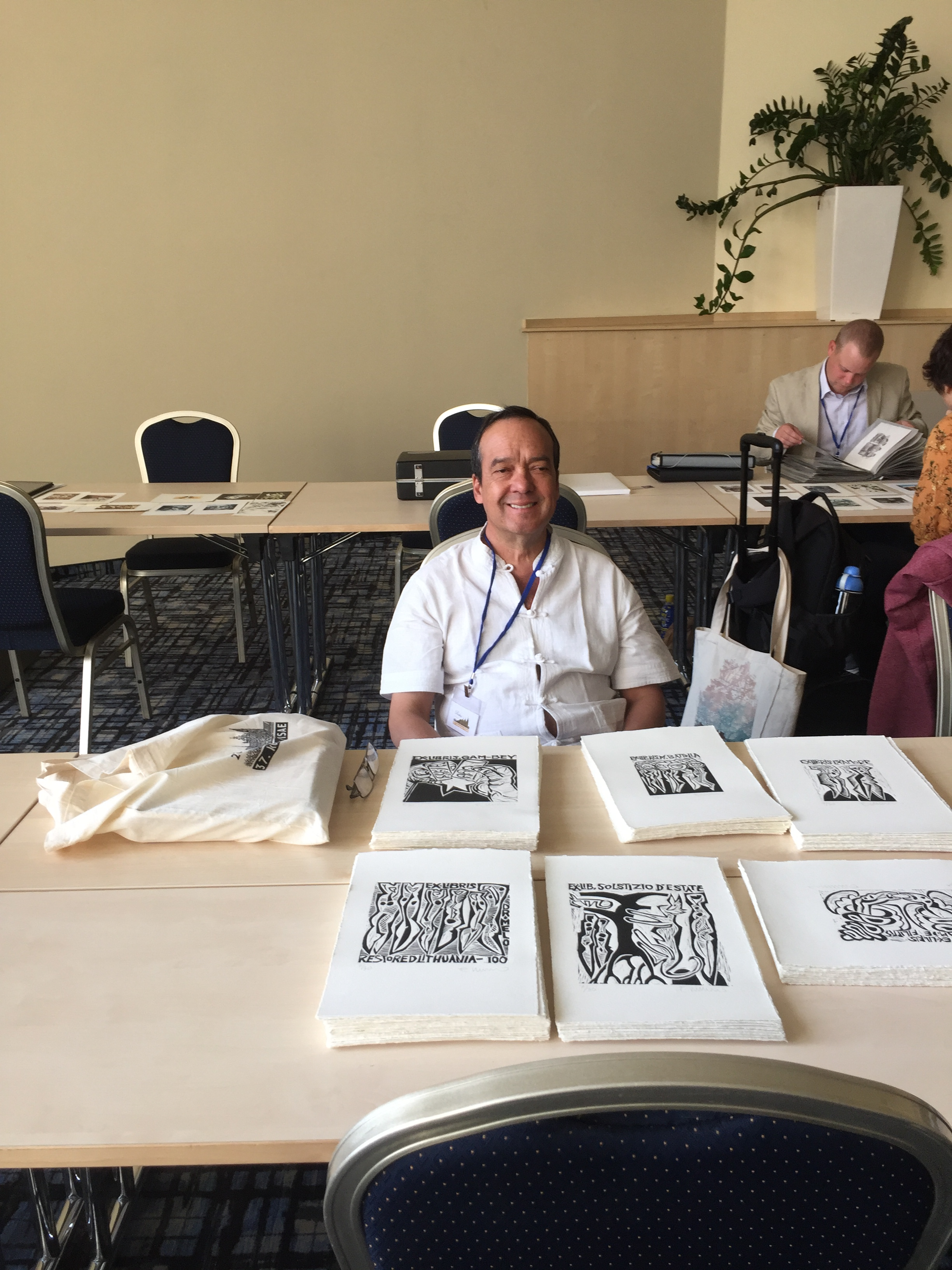
Emilio Carrasco Gutiérrez

Emilio Carrasco Gutiérrez (Note: In this Spanish name, the first or paternal surname is Carrasco and the second or maternal family name is Gutiérrez.) (4 October 1957– 30 October 2020) was a Mexican plastic artist recognized internationally for his artistic career. He worked in different disciplines such as painting, sculpture and engraving, among others. He was also a famous promoter and collector of Ex Libris, creator of the project "El Bosque de la Utopia" of which 9 international biennials were held. He promoted and participated in the International Mail Art Network for more than 30 years and was a research professor at the Autonomous University of Zacatecas (AUZ) for 23 years.

He participated in numerous competitions outside the country, obtaining multiple awards and honorable mentions. He did multiple individual and collective exhibitions in Europe, the United States of America, China, Turkey and Australia. He was also a guest of honour at some of China's top art universities.

== Biography ==
Emilio Carrasco Gutiérrez, born in Mexico City on 4 October 1957, studied drawing in the workshop of Professor Carlos Orozco Romero, and drawing and painting with the Professor Gilberto Aceves Navarro at the National Autonomous University of Mexico (Academy of San Carlos). He obtained the title of drawing teacher at Real Academia de Bellas Artes de San Fernando in Madrid, Spain, in 1981, and later obtained a speciality in museology from the National Institute Of Fine Arts of Mexico.

Emilio Carrasco died on 30 October 2020.
