= Christof Babatz =

German footballer

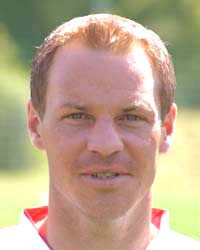

Personal information
- Full name: Christof Babatz
- Date of birth: 3 September 1974 (age 52)
- Place of birth: Hanover, West Germany
- Height: 1.78 m (5 ft 10 in)
- Position: Midfielder

Youth career
- –1986: TSV Schulenburg
- 1986–1990: Germania Grasdorf
- 1990–1993: Hannover 96

Senior career*
Years	Team	Apps	(Gls)
1993–1997	Hannover 96	61	(4)
1997–1999	Hamburger SV (A)	27	(1)
1997–1999	Hamburger SV	26	(0)
1999–2007	Mainz 05	171	(21)
2007	TuS Koblenz	6	(1)
2007–2009	Waldhof Mannheim	46	(5)
Total		337	(32)

International career
- Germany U-17
- * Club domestic league appearances and goals

Christof Babatz (born 3 September 1974) is a former German professional footballer who played as a midfielder.

== Career ==
Babatz was born in Hanover. He played for TSV Schulenburg, SV Germania Grasdorf, Hannover 96, and Hamburger SV. In 2000, he transferred to 1. FSV Mainz 05, and stayed with them for five seasons, helping them reach the Bundesliga. In 2007, Babatz moved to TuS Koblenz, playing only six games before finishing his career with SV Waldhof Mannheim.
