= Mike Slivinski =

American soccer player

Personal information
- Full name: Michael Slivinski
- Date of birth: October 31, 1974 (age 51)
- Place of birth: St. Louis, Missouri, United States
- Height: 5 ft 7 in (1.70 m)
- Position: Midfielder

Youth career
- 1991–1992: St. Louis Scott Gallagher

College career
Years	Team	Apps	(Gls)
1993–1997	Virginia Cavaliers		

Senior career*
Years	Team	Apps	(Gls)
1998–2000	D.C. United	23	(0)
1998	→ MLS Pro-40 (loan)	5	(0)
1998	→ Hampton Roads Mariners (loan)	3	(0)
1999	→ Northern Virginia Royals (loan)	1	(0)
1999	→ Maryland Mania (loan)	2	(0)
1999	→ MLS Pro-40 (loan)	7	(0)
2000	→ San Diego Flash (loan)	8	(1)
2001	Milwaukee Rampage	8	(1)

International career^{‡}
1991	United States	1	(0)
- * Club domestic league appearances and goals as of 05:21, 3 January 2007 (UTC) ‡ National team caps and goals as of 9 June 2007

Mike Slivinski (born October 31, 1974) is an American former professional soccer player.

== Youth and college ==
Slivinski, a native of St. Louis, Missouri, grew up immersed in that city's soccer culture. Beginning playing when he was five, Slivinski became a member of the Scott Gallagher soccer club. Slivinski attended Francis Howell North High School where he was the 1992–1993 Gatorade Player of the Year for the state of Missouri. Slivinski attended the University of Virginia where he was a member of the men's soccer team from 1993 to 1996. A forward with blazing speed and electrifying creativity, Slivinski's college career was shattered when he suffered a torn ACL. Though he recovered from the injury after a year's hiatus, he was never the same. In 1994, Slivinski was unable to play for the Cavaliers as he was academically ineligible. He received an academic suspension for the 1994 season and was not in school that semester.

== Professional career ==
On March 14, 1998 D.C. United of Major League Soccer (MLS) signed Slivinski as a discovery player. That season he saw time in nineteen games, but had difficulty finding playing time the next two seasons. As a result, United loaned him to MLS Pro-40, Hampton Roads Mariners, Northern Virginia Royals, Maryland Mania and San Diego Flash. United waived him on June 30, 2000, after he played only two games that season.

Slivinski signed with the Milwaukee Rampage of USL First Division for the 2001 season. He played eight games and scored one goal.

== International ==
Slivinski was selected for the U.S. team at the 1991 FIFA U-17 World Championship. The U.S. went 3–0 in the first round, but fell to Qatar in penalty kicks in the second round.

Slivinski earned one cap with the U.S. national team. On September 14, 1991, he started in a 1–0 victory over Jamaica. He was 16 years and 10 months old, a record for the youngest player capped by the U.S., a record since eclipsed by Freddy Adu.
