= Ibrahim Hussein (footballer) =

Sudanese footballer (born 1970)

Personal information
- Full name: Ibrahim Hussein Al-Hussein Al-Wageia
- Date of birth: 25 September 1975 (age 51)
- Place of birth: Sudan
- Position: Midfielder

Youth career
- 1987-1991: Al-Merrikh SC

Senior career*
Years	Team	Apps	(Gls)
1990–2000	Al Merrikh SC		
2000	Al-Sahel SC		
2001–2003	Al Merrikh SC		

International career
1994–2000	Sudan	15	(1)

Managerial career
- 2016–2018: El Hilal SC El Obeid
- 2019: Al Merrikh SC
- 2019–2021: Khartoum NC
- 2021: Al Merrikh SC
- 2022: Al Merrikh SC
- 2024: Al Merrikh SC
- 2025–2026: El Merriekh SC Bentiu
- * Club domestic league appearances and goals

Ibrahim Hussein Al-Hussein Al-Wageia (Arabic: ابراهيم حسين; born 25 September 1975) is a Sudanese football manager and former footballer who last managed El Merriekh SC Bentiu.

== Playing career ==
Hussein played as a midfielder and has been nicknamed "Ibrahoma" and started his career with Sudanese side Al Merrikh SC, helping the club win the league title. While playing for them, he captained them at the age of twenty-three and was regarded as a fan favorite.

Following his stint there, he signed for Kuwaiti side Al-Sahel SC in 2000, before returning to Sudanese side Al Merrikh SC in 2001, helping the club win the league title and the 2001 Sudan Cup.

== Managerial career ==
In 2016, Hussein worked as manager of Sudanese side El Hilal SC El Obeid, helping then club achieve qualification for the CAF Confederation Cup for the first time in their history and achieve second place at the 2016 Sudan Cup.

Subsequently, he was appointed manager of Sudanese side Al Merrikh SC, helping the club win the league title, becoming the first person to win the Sudan Premier League as a player and as a manager. The same year, he was appointed manager of Sudanese side Khartoum NC. During the spring of 2025, he was appointed manager of South Sudanese side El Merriekh SC Bentiu, helping the club win the 2026 South Sudan National Cup and the league title, the first league title in their history and the 2025 South Sudan Super Cup.
