= 1991 UEFA European Under-16 Championship =

U-16-Fußball-Europameisterschaft 1991 Championnat d'Europe de football des moins de 16 ans 1991 Campionato di calcio europeo Under-16 1991 Campiunadis Europeans da ballape U16 1991

Tournament details
- Host country: Switzerland
- Dates: 8–18 May
- Teams: 16 (from 1 confederation)

Final positions
- Champions: Spain (3rd title)
- Runners-up: Germany
- Third place: Greece
- Fourth place: France

Tournament statistics
- Matches played: 28
- Goals scored: 72 (2.57 per match)

The 1991 UEFA European Under-16 Championship was the 9th edition of the UEFA's European Under-16 Football Championship. Players born on or after 1 August 1974 were eligible to participate in this competition. Switzerland hosted the 16 teams that contested 8–18 May 1991.

Czechoslovakia did not defend its first title.

Spain won their third title.

== Participants ==
- Austria
- Bulgaria
- Denmark
- Finland
- France
- Germany
- Greece
- Iceland
- Poland
- Portugal
- Romania
- Soviet Union
- Spain
- Sweden
- Switzerland
- Yugoslavia

== Results ==
=== First stage ===
==== Group A ====
| Team | Pld | W | D | L | GF | GA | GD | Pts |
|---|---|---|---|---|---|---|---|---|
| Germany | 3 | 2 | 0 | 1 | 7 | 3 | +4 | 4 |
| Austria | 3 | 2 | 0 | 1 | 5 | 3 | +2 | 4 |
| Sweden | 3 | 2 | 0 | 1 | 2 | 1 | +1 | 4 |
| Bulgaria | 3 | 0 | 0 | 3 | 1 | 8 | −7 | 0 |

8 May 1991

| Bulgaria | 0–1 | Sweden |

Frauenfeld

8 May 1991

| Austria | 3–1 | Germany |

St. Gallen

10 May 1991

| Bulgaria | 1–2 | Austria |

Wil

10 May 1991

| Sweden | 0–1 | Germany |

Weinfelden

12 May 1991

| Bulgaria | 0–5 | Germany |

Kreuzlingen

12 May 1991

| Sweden | 1–0 | Austria |

St. Gallen

==== Group B ====
| Team | Pld | W | D | L | GF | GA | GD | Pts |
|---|---|---|---|---|---|---|---|---|
| Greece | 3 | 2 | 1 | 0 | 6 | 1 | +5 | 5 |
| Portugal | 3 | 2 | 1 | 0 | 4 | 1 | +3 | 5 |
| Poland | 3 | 0 | 1 | 2 | 1 | 3 | −2 | 1 |
| Switzerland | 3 | 0 | 1 | 2 | 1 | 7 | −6 | 1 |

8 May 1991

| Greece | 1–0 | Poland |

Lenzburg

8 May 1991

| Portugal | 2–0 | Switzerland |
|---|---|---|
| Bambo 64'; Nuno Luis 68' |

Muri

10 May 1991

| Portugal | 1–1 | Greece |
|---|---|---|
| Figueiredo 39' | | 1' Stavrakopoulos |

Baden

10 May 1991

| Switzerland | 1–1 | Poland |

Zofingen

12 May 1991

| Switzerland | 0–4 | Greece |

Aarau

12 May 1991

| Portugal | 1–0 | Poland |
|---|---|---|
| Nuno Afonso 11' |

Wettingen

==== Group C ====
| Team | Pld | W | D | L | GF | GA | GD | Pts |
|---|---|---|---|---|---|---|---|---|
| France | 3 | 2 | 1 | 0 | 7 | 1 | +6 | 5 |
| Finland | 3 | 1 | 1 | 1 | 3 | 3 | 0 | 3 |
| Romania | 3 | 1 | 1 | 1 | 3 | 5 | −2 | 3 |
| Denmark | 3 | 0 | 1 | 2 | 3 | 7 | −4 | 1 |

8 May 1991

| Romania | 1–1 | Denmark |

Yverdon-les-Bains

8 May 1991

| France | 0–0 | Finland |

Vevey
Referee: (Socialist Federal Republic of Yugoslavia) Branimir Babarogić

10 May 1991

| France | 3–0 | Romania |

Yverdon-les-Bains

10 May 1991

| Finland | 2–1 | Denmark |
|---|---|---|
| Ristilä; Pylkäs |

Renens
Referee: (Iceland) Eyjólfur Ólafsson

12 May 1991

| Finland | 1–2 | Romania |
|---|---|---|
| Kiljunen |

Vevey
Referee: (Portugal) Jorge Emanuel Monteiro Coroado

12 May 1991

| France | 4–1 | Denmark |

Renens

==== Group D ====
| Team | Pld | W | D | L | GF | GA | GD | Pts |
|---|---|---|---|---|---|---|---|---|
| Spain | 3 | 2 | 0 | 1 | 8 | 5 | +3 | 4 |
| Soviet Union | 3 | 2 | 0 | 1 | 6 | 5 | +1 | 4 |
| Iceland | 3 | 1 | 0 | 2 | 3 | 5 | −2 | 2 |
| Yugoslavia | 3 | 1 | 0 | 2 | 5 | 7 | −2 | 2 |

8 May 1991

| Yugoslavia | 1–2 | Iceland |

Sursee

8 May 1991

| Soviet Union | 1–4 | Spain |
|---|---|---|
| Kechinov 29' | | Robaina 16'; Gerardo 24'; Murgui 44'; Quique Medina 65' |

Baar
Referee: (Austria) Alfred Wieser

10 May 1991

| Yugoslavia | 1–3 | Soviet Union |

Küsnacht

10 May 1991

| Iceland | 1–2 | Spain |
|---|---|---|
| Hreiðarsson 80' | | Ramón 32'; Robaina 56' |

Hochdorf
Referee: (Germany) Karl-Josef Assenmacher

12 May 1991

| Yugoslavia | 3–2 | Spain |
|---|---|---|
| Radak 4' (pen.); Nađ 34'; Rogan 86' | | Robaina 20'; Murgui 28' |

Menzingen
Referee: (France) Rémi Harrel

12 May 1991

| Iceland | 0–2 | Soviet Union |

Entlebuch

=== Semi-finals ===
15 May 1991

| Germany | 1–1 | France |
Penalties
| | 7–6 |

Bulle
Referee: (Soviet Union) Sergei Khusainov
15 May 1991

| Greece | 0–1 | Spain |
|---|---|---|
| | | Robaina 44' |

Langenthal
Referee: (Switzerland) Arturo Martino

=== Third place match ===
18 May 1991

| France | 1–1 | Greece |
Penalties
| | 4–5 |

Bern
Referee: (Socialist Federal Republic of Yugoslavia) Branimir Babarogić

=== Final ===
18 May 1991

| Germany | 0–2 | Spain |
|---|---|---|
| | | Robaina 25', 35' |

Wankdorf Stadium, Bern
Referee: (Sweden) Anders Frisk
