= 1991 FIFA U-17 World Championship =

1st FIFA U-17 World Championship for the FIFA/JVC Cup 1991 FIFA U-17 Campionato del Mondo

Tournament details
- Host country: Italy
- Dates: 16–31 August
- Teams: 16 (from 6 confederations)
- Venue: 6 (in 6 host cities)

Final positions
- Champions: Ghana (1st title)
- Runners-up: Spain
- Third place: Argentina
- Fourth place: Qatar

Tournament statistics
- Matches played: 32
- Goals scored: 81 (2.53 per match)
- Attendance: 37,000 (1,156 per match)
- Top scorer: (Brazil) Adriano
- Best player: (Ghana) Nii Lamptey
- Fair play award: Argentina

The 1991 FIFA U-17 World Championship, the fourth edition of the tournament, was held in the cities of Florence, Montecatini Terme, Viareggio, Massa, Carrara, and Livorno in Italy between 16 and 31 August 1991. Players born after 1 August 1974 could participate in this tournament.

Saudi Arabia, the 1989 champions, were not able to defend their title as they withdrew from the final round of the AFC qualifying tournament, citing the Blue Diamond Affair.

The tournament was originally to be scheduled in Ecuador, but due to the cholera outbreak earlier that year, it was moved to Italy, which hosted the previous year's World Cup. This was the second time a FIFA event was moved from its original hosting country, after the 1986 World Cup was moved from Colombia to Mexico.

== Cities & Stadiums ==
Città	Stadio
Florence	Stadio Artemio Franchi
Livorno	Stadio Armando Picchi
Massa	Stadio Gianpiero Vitali
Carrara	Stadio dei Marmi
Montecatini Terme	Stadio Daniele Mariotti
Viareggio	Stadio Torquato Bresciani

== Qualified Teams ==
Confederation	Qualifying Tournament	Qualifier(s)
AFC (Asia)	1990 AFC U-16 Championship	China; Qatar; United Arab Emirates
CAF (Africa)	1991 African U-17 Qualifying for World Cup	Congo; Ghana; Sudan
CONCACAF (Central, North America and Caribbean)	1991 CONCACAF U-17 Tournament	Cuba; Mexico; United States
CONMEBOL (South America)	1991 South American U-17 Championship	Argentina; Brazil; Uruguay
OFC (Oceania)	1991 OFC U-17 Championship	Australia
UEFA (Europe)	Host nation	Italy^{1}
UEFA (Europe)	1991 UEFA European Under-16 Championship	Germany; Spain

1. replacing Ecuador.

== Squads ==
For a list of all squads that played in the final tournament, see 1991 FIFA U-17 World Championship squads

== Referees ==
Asia

- (Saudi Arabia) Omar Al-Mohanna
- (Malaysia) Lechmanasamy Kathirveloo
- (Syria) Nizar Watti

Africa

- (Benin) Sylvain Abikanlou
- (Tunisia) Rachid Ben Khadija
- (Mauritius) Lim Kee Chong

CONCACAF

- (Trinidad and Tobago) Errol Forbes
- (Mexico) Miguel Angel Salas
- (Antigua and Barbuda) Arlington Success

South America

- (Argentina) Juan Bava
- (Paraguay) Sabino Cespedes
- (Ecuador) Jorge Orellano
- (Brazil) Ulisses Tavares da Silva

Europe

- (Italy) Angelo Amendolia
- (Italy) Fabio Baldas
- (Denmark) Jan Damgaard
- (France) Philippe Leduc
- (Sweden) Leif Sundell
- (Netherlands) Mario van der Ende

Oceania

- (New Zealand) Ronald Gallon

== Group stages ==
=== Group A ===
Teams	Pts	Pld	W	D	L	GF	GA	GD	Status
United States	6	3	3	0	0	5	1	4	Advanced to the quarterfinals
Argentina	3	3	1	1	1	2	2	0	Advanced to the quarterfinals
Italy	2	3	0	2	1	2	3	−1	Eliminated
China	1	3	0	1	2	4	7	−3	Eliminated

August 16, 1991
18:00

Italy	0–1	United States
	(Report)	Dunne 18'

Montecatini Terme
Attendance: 3,200
Referee: Ulisses Tavares da Silva (Brazil)

August 17, 1991
21:00

China	1–2	Argentina
Gao Fei 58'	(Report)	Verón 50'; Castellani 77' (pen.)

Viareggio
Attendance: 350
Referee: Leif Sundell (Sweden)

August 20, 1991
18:00

Italy	2–2	China
Del Piero 30'; Giraldi 67'	(Report)	Liang Yu 14'; Huang Yi 73'

Viareggio
Attendance: 1,200
Referee: Miguel Angel Salas Castillo (Mexico)

August 20, 1991
20:00

United States	1–0	Argentina
McKeon 23'	(Report)

Viareggio
Attendance: 1,200
Referee: Rachid Ben Khedija (Tunisia)

August 22, 1991
18:00

Italy	0–0	Argentina
	(Report)

Viareggio
Attendance: 2,000
Referee: Philippe Leduc (France)

August 22, 1991
20:00

United States	3–1	China
Beachum 6'; Montoya 37'; McKeon 71'	(Report)	Gao Fei 32'

Viareggio
Attendance: 2,000
Referee: Nizar Watti (Syria)

=== Group B ===
Venue: Carrara

Teams	Pts	Pld	W	D	L	GF	GA	GD	Status
Australia	4	3	2	0	1	6	4	2	Advanced to the quarterfinals
Qatar	3	3	1	1	1	1	1	0	Advanced to the quarterfinals
Congo	3	3	1	1	1	2	3	−1	Eliminated
Mexico	2	3	1	0	2	5	6	−1	Eliminated

August 17, 1991
21:00

Congo	0–0	Qatar
	(Report)

Attendance: 600
Referee: Jorge Osvaldo Orellana Vimos (Ecuador)

August 18, 1991
21:00

Australia	4–3	Mexico
Agostino 5', 28', 29'; Kiratzoglu 17'	(Report)	Garza 25'; Toledano 69', 74'

Attendance: 500
Referee: Lim Kee Chong (Mauritius)

August 20, 1991
19:00

Congo	0–2	Australia
	(Report)	Healey 63'; Kiratzoglu 74'

Attendance: 200
Referee: Letchmanasamy Kathirveloo (Malaysia)

August 20, 1991
21:00

Qatar	0–1	Mexico
	(Report)	Toledano 5'

Attendance: 200
Referee: Sabino Farina Cespedes (Paraguay)

August 22, 1991
19:00

Congo	2–1	Mexico
Kibiti 17'; Tchicaya 31'	(Report)	García 71'

Attendance: 400
Referee: Mario van der Ende (Netherlands)

August 22, 1991
21:00

Qatar	1–0	Australia
Al Tamimi 76'	(Report)

Attendance: 400
Referee: Juan Bava (Argentina)

=== Group C ===
Venue: Massa

Teams	Pts	Pld	W	D	L	GF	GA	GD	Status
Brazil	6	3	3	0	0	7	0	7	Advanced to the quarterfinals
Germany	3	3	1	1	1	5	5	0	Advanced to the quarterfinals
Sudan	2	3	1	0	2	5	5	0	Eliminated
United Arab Emirates	1	3	0	1	2	3	10	−7	Eliminated

August 17, 1991
21:00

Sudan	4–1	United Arab Emirates
Nemairi 34'; Ibrahim 36'; Ahmed 37'; Elmustafa 47'	(Report)	Mohamed 59'

Attendance: 250
Referee: Arlington Success (Antigua & Barbuda)

August 18, 1991
19:00

Germany	0–2	Brazil
	(Report)	Argel 18'; Adriano 39'

Attendance: 800
Referee: Fabio Baldas(Italy)

August 20, 1991
19:00

Sudan	1–3	Germany
Ahmed 78'	(Report)	Sarna 48'; Jaekel 62', 75'

Attendance: 200
Referee: Angelo Amendolia (Italy)

August 20, 1991
21:00

United Arab Emirates	0–4	Brazil
	(Report)	Yan 20'; Nenê 26'; Adriano 58', 62'

Attendance: 200
Referee: Jan Damgaard(Denmark)

August 22, 1991
19:00

Sudan	0–1	Brazil
	(Report)	Adriano 73'

Attendance: 500
Referee: Angelo Amendolia(Italy)

August 22, 1991
21:00

United Arab Emirates	2–2	Germany
Abdulrahman 12' (pen.); Ibrahim 44'	(Report)	Lutz 8'; Sarna 51'

Attendance: 500
Referee: Jorge Osvaldo Orellana Vimos(Ecuador)

=== Group D ===
Venue: Livorno

Teams	Pts	Pld	W	D	L	GF	GA	GD	Status
Spain	5	3	2	1	0	9	3	6	Advanced to the quarterfinals
Ghana	5	3	2	1	0	5	2	3	Advanced to the quarterfinals
Uruguay	2	3	1	0	2	1	3	−2	Eliminated
Cuba	0	3	0	0	3	3	10	−7	Eliminated

August 17, 1991
21:00

Ghana	2–1	Cuba
Lamptey 8', 51' (pen.)	(Report)	Sánchez 26'

Attendance: 1,500
Referee: Omar Al Mehanna (Saudi Arabia)

August 18, 1991
21:00

Uruguay	0–1	Spain
	(Report)	Dani 64'

Attendance: 1,400
Referee: Nizar Watti(Syria)

August 20, 1991
19:00

Ghana	2–0	Uruguay
Gargo 36'; Lamptey 52'	(Report)

Attendance: 1,300
Referee: Errol Forbes (Trinidad And Tobago)

August 20, 1991
21:00

Cuba	2–7	Spain
Marten 56'; Casamayor 66'	(Report)	Robaina 5', 23'; Emilio Carrasco 13'; Murgui 43'; Velasco 52'; Palacios 58'; Ramón 74'

Attendance: 1,300
Referee: Fabio Baldas (Italy)

August 22, 1991
19:00

Ghana	1–1	Spain
Opoku 42'	(Report)	Gálvez 62'

Attendance: 1,300
Referee: Ulisses Tavares da Silva(Brazil)

August 22, 1991
21:00

Cuba	0–1	Uruguay
	(Report)	López 72'

Attendance: 1,300
Referee: Lim Kee Chong (Mauricio)

== Knockout stage ==
Quarter-finals
August 25 – Montecatini Terme
United States	1 (4)
Qatar (pen.)	1 (5)
August 25 – Carrara
Brazil	1
Ghana	2
August 25 – Viareggio
Australia	1
Argentina	2
August 25 – Livorno
Spain	3
Germany	1

Semi-finals
August 28 – Viareggio
Qatar	0 (2)
Ghana (pen.)	0 (4)
August 28 – Massa
Argentina	0
Spain	1

Final
August 31 – Florence
Ghana	1
Spain	0
Third place
August 30 – Montecatini Terme
Qatar	1 (1)
Argentina (pen.)	1 (4)

=== Quarter-finals ===
August 25, 1991
18:00

United States	1–1 (a.e.t.) (4–5 pen.)	Qatar
Kelly 3'	(Report)	Bu 14'

Montecatini Terme
Attendance: 2,000
Referee: Jorge Osvaldo Orellana Vimos(Ecuador)

August 25, 1991
21:00

Australia	1–2	Argentina
Azconzobal 75' (o.g.)	(Report)	Comelles 29', 55'

Viareggio
Attendance: 1,100
Referee: Fabio Baldas(Italy)

August 25, 1991
21:00

Brazil	1–2	Ghana
Leandro 42'	(Report)	Lamptey 36'; Gargo 58'

Carrara
Attendance: 1,200
Referee: Leif Sundell (Swedish)

August 25, 1991
21:00

Spain	3–1	Germany
Murgui 59'; Robaina 72'; Josemi 80'	(Report)	Babatz 15'

Livorno
Attendance: 1,100
Referee: Nizar Watti (Syria)

=== Semi-finals ===
August 28, 1991
18:00

Qatar	0–0 (a.e.t.) (2–4 pen.)	Ghana
	(Report)

Viareggio
Attendance: 1,200
Referee: Fabio Baldas(Italy)

August 28, 1991
21:00

Argentina	0–1	Spain
	(Report)	Murgui 22'

Massa
Attendance: 1,100
Referee: Jan Damgaard (Denmark)

=== Third place play-off ===
August 30, 1991
18:00

Qatar	1–1 (a.e.t.) (1–4 pen.)	Argentina
Al Bedaid 60'	(Report)	Akselman 80'

Montecatini Terme
Attendance: 1,500
Referee: Mario van der Ende (Netherlands)

=== Final ===
August 31, 1991
18:00

Ghana	1–0	Spain
Duah 77'	(Report)

Florence
Attendance: 5,000
Referee: Leif Sundell (Swedish)

== Result ==
FIFA U-17 World Championship 1991 winners

Ghana
First title

== Awards ==
Golden Shoe	Golden Ball	FIFA Fair Play
(Brazil) Adriano (4 goals)	(Ghana) Nii Lamptey	Argentina

== Goalscorers ==
Adriano of Brazil won the Golden Shoe award for scoring four goals. In total, 81 goals were scored by 59 different players, with only one of them credited as own goals.

4 goals

- (Brazil) Adriano
- (Ghana) Nii Lamptey

3 goals

- (Australia) Paul Agostino
- (Mexico) Jorge Toledano
- (Spain) Antonio Robaina
- (Spain) Juan Carlos Murgui

2 goals

- (Argentina) Ruben Comelles
- (Australia) Alex Kiratzoglu
- (China) Gao Fei
- (Germany) Goya Jaekel
- (Germany) Jens Sarna
- (Ghana) Mohammed Gargo
- (Sudan) Mohamed Ahmed
- (United States) Matt McKeon

1 goal

- (Argentina) Christian Akselman
- (Argentina) Juan Sebastián Verón
- (Argentina) Ricardo Castellani
- (Australia) Aaron Healey
- (Brazil) Argel
- (Brazil) Leandro
- (Brazil) Nenê
- (Brazil) Yan
- (China) Huang Yi
- (China) Liang Yu
- (Republic of the Congo) Gaston Kibiti
- (Republic of the Congo) Patrick Tchicaya
- (Cuba) Eliezer Casamayor
- (Cuba) Luis Marten
- (Cuba) Vladimir Sánchez
- (Germany) Christof Babatz
- (Germany) Karl-Heinz Lutz
- (Ghana) Emmanuel Duah
- (Ghana) Nana Opoku
- (Italy) Alessandro Del Piero
- (Italy) Daniele Giraldi
- (Mexico) García
- (Mexico) Mario Garza
- (Qatar) Ahmed Bu
- (Qatar) Jassim Al Tamimi
- (Qatar) Mohamed Al Bedaid
- (Sudan) Ibrahim Hussein
- (Sudan) Khalid Elmustafa
- (Sudan) Nemairi Saeed
- (Spain) César Palacios
- (Spain) Dani
- (Spain) Emilio Carrasco
- (Spain) James Beattie
- (Spain) José Miguel López
- (Spain) Pedro Velasco Morón
- (Spain) Ramón
- (United Arab Emirates) Adel Mohamed
- (United Arab Emirates) Ali Abdulrahman
- (United Arab Emirates) Jamal Ibrahim
- (United States) Albertin Montoya
- (United States) Brian Kelly
- (United States) Mike Dunne
- (United States) Shohn Beachum
- (Uruguay) Diego López

Own goal

- (Argentina) Juan Azconzobal (playing against Australia)

== Final ranking ==
Rank	Team	Pld	W	D	L	GF	GA	GD	Pts
1	Ghana	6	4	2	0	8	3	+5	10
2	Spain	6	4	1	1	13	5	+8	9
3	Argentina	6	2	2	2	5	5	0	6
4	Qatar	6	1	4	1	3	3	0	6
Eliminated in the quarter-finals
5	United States	4	3	1	0	6	2	+4	7
6	Brazil	4	3	0	1	8	2	+6	6
7	Australia	4	2	0	2	7	6	+1	4
8	Germany	4	1	1	2	6	8	–2	3
Eliminated at the group stage
9	Congo	3	1	1	1	2	3	–1	3
10	Sudan	3	1	0	2	5	5	0	2
11	Mexico	3	1	0	2	5	6	–1	2
12	Italy	3	0	2	1	2	3	–1	2
13	Uruguay	3	1	0	2	1	3	–2	2
14	China	3	0	1	2	4	7	–3	1
15	United Arab Emirates	3	0	1	2	3	10	–7	1
16	Cuba	3	0	0	3	3	10	–7	0
