= 2003 FIFA World Youth Championship squads =

FIFA championship roster

Below are the rosters for the 2003 FIFA World Youth Championship tournament in UAE.

Players name marked in bold went on to earn full international caps.

== Group A ==
=== Burkina Faso ===
Head coach: (Netherlands) Mart Nooij

No.	Pos.	Player	Date of birth (age)	Caps	Club
1	GK	**Daouda Diakité**	30 March 1983 (aged 20)		(Burkina Faso) Étoile Filante Ouagadougou
2	DF	Saybou Diallo	21 September 1983 (aged 20)		(Burkina Faso) ASF Bobo
3	DF	Daouda Kinda	28 October 1986 (aged 17)		(Burkina Faso) Kadiogo
4	DF	**Saïdou Panandétiguiri**	22 March 1984 (aged 19)		(France) Bordeaux
5	DF	**Salif Nogo**	31 December 1986 (aged 16)		(Burkina Faso) Ouagadougou
6	DF	**Jeannot Bouyain**	29 March 1985 (aged 18)		(Burkina Faso) Kadiogo
7	DF	**Amadou Coulibaly**	30 December 1984 (aged 18)		(Burkina Faso) ASF Bobo-Dioulasso
8	MF	**Boureima Maïga**	15 November 1983 (aged 20)		(Belgium) Lokeren
9	FW	**Aristide Bancé**	19 September 1984 (aged 19)		(Belgium) Lokeren
10	MF	**Abdoul-Aziz Nikiema**	12 June 1985 (aged 18)		(France) Bordeaux
11	FW	**Djibril Compaoré**	1 August 1983 (aged 20)		(Burkina Faso) ASFA Yennenga
12	DF	**Soumaila Tassembedo**	27 November 1983 (aged 20)		(Burkina Faso) Étoile Filante Ouagadougou
13	DF	**Boureima Ouattara**	13 January 1984 (aged 19)		(Burkina Faso) ASF Bobo
14	MF	Roland Sanou	24 May 1983 (aged 20)		(Burkina Faso) ASF Bobo
15	MF	**Ousseni Zongo**	6 August 1984 (aged 19)		(Belgium) Anderlecht
16	GK	Dieudonné Yarga	24 February 1986 (aged 17)		(Burkina Faso) ASFA Yennenga
17	FW	**Hamado Ouedraogo**	17 March 1983 (aged 20)		(Belgium) Lokeren
18	MF	**Amara Ahmed Ouattara**	21 October 1983 (aged 20)		(Ivory Coast) ASEC Mimosas
19	FW	Ibrahim Kaboré	5 September 1984 (aged 19)		(Burkina Faso) Étoile Filante Ouagadougou
20	FW	Seydou Barro	5 April 1984 (aged 19)		(Burkina Faso) Étoile Filante Ouagadougou

=== Panama ===
Head coach: (England) Gary Stempel

No.	Pos.	Player	Date of birth (age)	Caps	Club
1	GK	Carlos Valdez	2 July 1984 (aged 19)		(Panama) Chiriquí
2	DF	Miguel Olivares	3 August 1984 (aged 19)		(Panama) Arabe Unido
3	DF	**Armando Gun**	17 January 1986 (aged 17)		(Panama) Chepo
4	MF	**Juan Ramón Solís**	14 June 1984 (aged 19)		(Panama) San Francisco
5	DF	**Joel Solanilla**	24 December 1983 (aged 19)		(Colombia) Patriotas
6	MF	**Gabriel Gómez**	29 May 1984 (aged 19)		(Colombia) Envigado
7	FW	Jair Carrasquilla	27 April 1984 (aged 19)		(Panama) Tauro
8	FW	Cristian Vega	2 April 1985 (aged 18)		(Panama) Tauro
9	FW	**Orlando Rodríguez**	9 August 1984 (aged 19)		(Panama) Arabe Unido
10	MF	James Brown	28 February 1983 (aged 20)		(Panama) Atlético Veragüense
11	MF	Rodrigo Tello	13 August 1983 (aged 20)		(Panama) Arabe Unido
12	GK	**José Calderón**	14 August 1985 (aged 18)		(Panama) Chepo
13	FW	César Aguilar	6 December 1984 (aged 18)		(Panama) San Francisco
14	DF	Irving Bailey	13 January 1984 (aged 19)		(Panama) Alianza
15	FW	René Cohn	18 February 1983 (aged 20)		(Panama) Plaza Amador
16	MF	**Jean McLean**	16 January 1984 (aged 19)		(Panama) Chiriquí Province
17	MF	Kairo Martínez	23 September 1983 (aged 20)		(Panama) Arabe Unido
18	MF	Ángel Lombardo	13 February 1983 (aged 20)		(Panama) Plaza Amador
19	DF	Édgar Tem	29 January 1984 (aged 19)		(Panama) Alianza
20	MF	Hanamell Hill	12 March 1986 (aged 17)		(Panama) Bocas Express

=== Slovakia ===
Head coach: Peter Polák

No.	Pos.	Player	Date of birth (age)	Caps	Club
1	GK	Peter Kostoláni	6 February 1983 (aged 20)		(Slovakia) FC Družstevník Báč
2	DF	Marek Kostoláni	6 February 1983 (aged 20)		(Slovakia) Nitra
3	MF	**Marek Bakoš**	15 April 1983 (aged 20)		(Slovakia) Matador Púchov
4	DF	**Marek Čech**	26 January 1983 (aged 20)		(Slovakia) Inter Bratislava
5	DF	Roman Konečný	25 July 1983 (aged 20)		(Slovakia) Spartak Trnava
6	MF	**Marián Kurty**	13 May 1983 (aged 20)		(Slovakia) Ružomberok
7	FW	**Milan Ivana**	26 November 1983 (aged 20)		(Slovakia) Trenčín
8	MF	Tomáš Bruško	21 February 1983 (aged 20)		(Ukraine) Vorskla Poltava
9	FW	**Filip Šebo**	24 February 1984 (aged 19)		(Slovakia) Inter Bratislava
10	FW	**Juraj Halenár**	28 June 1983 (aged 20)		(Slovakia) Inter Bratislava
11	FW	**Filip Hološko**	17 January 1984 (aged 19)		(Czech Republic) Slovan Liberec
12	GK	**Dušan Perniš**	28 November 1984 (aged 18)		(Slovakia) Dubnica
13	MF	Štefan Zošák	3 April 1984 (aged 19)		(Slovakia) Ružomberok
14	MF	**Kamil Kopúnek**	18 May 1984 (aged 19)		(Slovakia) Spartak Trnava
15	MF	Dušan Miklas	7 February 1983 (aged 20)		(Slovakia) Trenčín
16	DF	**Miloš Brezinský**	2 April 1984 (aged 19)		(Czech Republic) Slovan Liberec
17	MF	Ľubomír Gajdoš	20 July 1983 (aged 20)		(Slovakia) 1. FC Košice
18	MF	**Igor Žofčák**	10 April 1983 (aged 20)		(Slovakia) Ružomberok
19	MF	**Viktor Pečovský**	24 May 1983 (aged 20)		(Slovakia) Dukla Banská Bystrica
20	DF	**Ľubomír Guldan**	30 January 1983 (aged 20)		(Slovakia) Koba Senec

=== United Arab Emirates ===
Head coach: (France) Jean François Jodar

No.	Pos.	Player	Date of birth (age)	Caps	Club
1	GK	Salem Abdulla	18 January 1984 (aged 19)		(United Arab Emirates) Al-Shabab
2	DF	Abdulla Ahmad	18 March 1983 (aged 20)		(United Arab Emirates) Dubai Club
3	MF	**Yousif Jaber**	25 February 1985 (aged 18)		(United Arab Emirates) Bani Yas
4	MF	Ahmed Abdulla	28 April 1984 (aged 19)		(United Arab Emirates) Al-Wahda
5	DF	Ali Al-Zaabi	8 June 1985 (aged 18)		(United Arab Emirates) Al-Wahda
6	DF	**Tariq Hassan**	18 March 1983 (aged 20)		(United Arab Emirates) Al Wasl FC
7	MF	**Ali Al-Wehaibi**	27 October 1983 (aged 20)		(United Arab Emirates) Al Ain Club
8	DF	Saad Mubarak	5 May 1983 (aged 20)		(United Arab Emirates) Bani Yas
9	MF	Redha Abdulhadi	1 January 1983 (aged 20)		(United Arab Emirates) Al-Jazira
10	FW	**Ismail Matar**	7 April 1983 (aged 20)		(United Arab Emirates) Al-Wahda
11	FW	Saleh Hamad	1 January 1984 (aged 19)		(United Arab Emirates) Al-Wahda
12	DF	Salem Zayed	25 April 1983 (aged 20)		(United Arab Emirates) Al-Wahda
13	FW	Darwush Ahmad	1 July 1984 (aged 19)		(United Arab Emirates) Al Nasr
14	MF	Majid Abdulla	23 March 1984 (aged 19)		(United Arab Emirates) Al-Ittihad Kalba SC
15	FW	**Shehab Ahmed**	29 March 1984 (aged 19)		(United Arab Emirates) Al Ain Club
16	MF	Juma Ali	29 April 1983 (aged 20)		(United Arab Emirates) Al Khaleej
17	GK	**Ismail Rabee**	11 January 1983 (aged 20)		(United Arab Emirates) Al-Shabab
18	DF	Abdulla Malallah	5 July 1983 (aged 20)		(United Arab Emirates) Emirates Club
19	FW	Mohamed Malallah	1 April 1984 (aged 19)		(United Arab Emirates) Al Khaleej
20	FW	Ali Sultan	29 January 1983 (aged 20)		(United Arab Emirates) Al Ain Club

== Group B ==
=== Argentina ===
Head coach: Hugo Tocalli

No.	Pos.	Player	Date of birth (age)	Caps	Club
1	GK	Gustavo Eberto	30 August 1983 (aged 20)		(Argentina) Boca Juniors
2	DF	**Gonzalo Rodríguez**	10 April 1984 (aged 19)		(Argentina) San Lorenzo
3	DF	Osmar Ferreyra	9 January 1983 (aged 20)		(Argentina) River Plate
4	DF	Mauricio Romero	13 January 1983 (aged 20)		(Argentina) Lanús
5	MF	**Javier Mascherano**	8 June 1984 (aged 19)		(Argentina) River Plate
6	DF	**Leandro Fernández**	30 January 1983 (aged 20)		(Argentina) Newell's Old Boys
7	MF	**Pablo Zabaleta**	16 January 1985 (aged 18)		(Argentina) San Lorenzo
8	MF	Hugo Colace	6 January 1984 (aged 19)		(Argentina) Argentinos Juniors
9	FW	**Fernando Cavenaghi**	21 September 1983 (aged 20)		(Argentina) River Plate
10	FW	**Carlos Tevez**	5 February 1984 (aged 19)		(Argentina) Boca Juniors
11	MF	Marcelo Carrusca	1 September 1983 (aged 20)		(Argentina) Estudiantes
12	GK	Mariano Barbosa	27 July 1984 (aged 19)		(Argentina) Banfield
13	DF	Joel Barbosa	15 January 1983 (aged 20)		(Argentina) Boca Juniors
14	DF	**Jonathan Bottinelli**	14 September 1984 (aged 19)		(Argentina) San Lorenzo
15	DF	Walter García	14 March 1984 (aged 19)		(Argentina) San Lorenzo
16	MF	**Neri Cardozo**	8 August 1986 (aged 17)		(Argentina) Boca Juniors
17	MF	**José Sosa**	19 June 1985 (aged 18)		(Argentina) Estudiantes
18	MF	**Walter Montillo**	14 April 1984 (aged 19)		(Argentina) San Lorenzo
19	FW	Germán Herrera	19 July 1983 (aged 20)		(Argentina) Rosario Central
20	FW	Franco Cángele	16 July 1984 (aged 19)		(Argentina) Boca Juniors

=== Mali ===
Head coach: Mamadou Coulibaly

No.	Pos.	Player	Date of birth (age)	Caps	Club
1	GK	**Soumbeïla Diakité**	25 August 1984 (aged 19)		(Mali) Stade Malien
2	MF	Moussa Bagayoko	10 January 1985 (aged 18)		(Mali) Djoliba
3	DF	Daouda Bagayoko	10 May 1985 (aged 18)		(Mali) Stade Malien
4	DF	Boucader Diallo	14 September 1984 (aged 19)		(Mali) Stade Malien
5	DF	**Boubacar Koné**	21 August 1984 (aged 19)		(Mali) Bamako
6	DF	**Alhassane Touré**	5 February 1984 (aged 19)		(Switzerland) Schaffhausen
7	MF	Mamadi Berthe	17 January 1983 (aged 20)		(France) Sedan
8	MF	**Mamoutou Coulibaly**	23 February 1984 (aged 19)		(France) Auxerre
9	FW	Youssouf Diallo	24 December 1984 (aged 18)		(France) Créteil
10	FW	Alain Traoré	11 July 1984 (aged 19)		(Mali) Stade Malien
11	DF	**Souleymane Dembélé**	3 September 1984 (aged 19)		(Mali) Stade Malien
12	MF	**Drissa Diakité**	18 February 1985 (aged 18)		(Mali) Djoliba
13	FW	Bakary Coulibaly	11 April 1984 (aged 19)		(Mali) Djoliba
14	DF	Sekou Coulibaly	3 February 1983 (aged 20)		(France) Lorient
15	MF	**Mamadou Diakité**	22 May 1985 (aged 18)		(France) Metz
16	FW	Siere Hadrien Touré	12 May 1985 (aged 18)		(France) Lyon
17	MF	Drissa Diarra	7 July 1985 (aged 18)		(Italy) Lecce
18	MF	**Kalifa Cissé**	9 January 1984 (aged 19)		(France) Toulouse
19	DF	Mahamet Diagouraga	8 January 1984 (aged 19)		(Italy) Chievo
20	GK	Mamadou Coulibaly	7 December 1987 (aged 15)		(Mali) Real Bamako

=== Spain ===
Head coach: José Ufarte

No.	Pos.	Player	Date of birth (age)	Caps	Club
1	GK	Miguel Ángel Moyá	2 April 1984 (aged 19)		(Spain) Mallorca
2	DF	Alexis	4 August 1985 (aged 18)		(Spain) Málaga
3	DF	Carlos Peña	28 July 1983 (aged 20)		(Spain) Barcelona
4	DF	Carlos García	29 April 1984 (aged 19)		(Spain) Espanyol
5	DF	Melli (c)	6 June 1984 (aged 19)		(Spain) Real Betis
6	MF	Vitolo	9 September 1983 (aged 20)		(Spain) Racing de Santander
7	MF	Coro	5 January 1983 (aged 20)		(Spain) Espanyol
8	MF	**Andrés Iniesta**	11 May 1984 (aged 19)		(Spain) Barcelona
9	FW	**Sergio García**	9 June 1983 (aged 20)		(Spain) Barcelona
10	FW	**Manu del Moral**	25 February 1984 (aged 19)		(Spain) Atlético Madrid
11	MF	Jaime Gavilán	12 May 1985 (aged 18)		(Spain) Valencia
12	DF	Iago Bouzón	17 March 1983 (aged 20)		(Spain) Celta de Vigo
13	GK	Asier Riesgo	6 October 1983 (aged 20)		(Spain) Eibar
14	FW	Javier Arizmendi	3 March 1984 (aged 19)		(Spain) Atlético Madrid
15	DF	Álex Goikoetxea	8 June 1983 (aged 20)		(Spain) Athletic Bilbao
16	MF	Gabi	10 July 1983 (aged 20)		(Spain) Atlético Madrid
17	MF	**Juanfran**	9 January 1985 (aged 18)		(Spain) Real Madrid
18	MF	Jorge Pina	28 February 1983 (aged 20)		(Spain) Real Zaragoza
19	MF	Manuel Tello	16 February 1984 (aged 19)		(Spain) Real Madrid
20	GK	Rubén	22 June 1984 (aged 19)		(Spain) Barcelona

=== Uzbekistan ===
Head coach: Viktor Borisov

No.	Pos.	Player	Date of birth (age)	Caps	Club
1	GK	Temur Ganiev	27 January 1984 (aged 19)		(Ukraine) Metallurg Donetsk
2	DF	**Shavkat Raimqulov**	7 May 1984 (aged 19)		(Uzbekistan) Traktor Tashkent
3	DF	Rustam Kadirov	27 July 1983 (aged 20)		(Uzbekistan) Mash'al Mubarek
4	DF	**Yaroslav Krushelnitskiy**	16 March 1983 (aged 20)		(Uzbekistan) Pakhtakor
5	DF	Muzaffar Holikov	7 October 1984 (aged 19)		(Uzbekistan) Qyzylqum Zarashfan
6	MF	**Jasur Hasanov**	2 August 1983 (aged 20)		(Uzbekistan) Navbahor Namangan
7	MF	Mansurjon Saidov	1 November 1983 (aged 20)		(Uzbekistan) Neftchy Farg'ona
8	MF	Nodirbek Quziboyev	17 February 1985 (aged 18)		(Uzbekistan) Neftchy Farg'ona
9	FW	**Alexander Geynrikh**	6 October 1984 (aged 19)		(Russia) CSKA Moscow
10	MF	**Ilyos Zeytulayev**	13 August 1984 (aged 19)		(Italy) Juventus
11	MF	**Ildar Magdeev**	11 April 1984 (aged 19)		(Uzbekistan) Pakhtakor
12	GK	**Ignatiy Nesterov**	20 June 1983 (aged 20)		(Uzbekistan) Pakhtakor
13	DF	**Kamoliddin Tajiev**	3 May 1983 (aged 20)		(Uzbekistan) Pakhtakor
14	FW	**Marat Bikmaev**	1 January 1986 (aged 17)		(Uzbekistan) Pakhtakor
15	FW	Konstantin Boyev	15 November 1983 (aged 20)		(Uzbekistan) Mash'al Mubarek
16	FW	Bakhriddin Vakhobov	23 January 1983 (aged 20)		(Uzbekistan) Pakhtakor
17	DF	Vladimir Anikin	5 March 1983 (aged 20)		(Uzbekistan) Neftchy Farg'ona
18	DF	**Islom Inomov**	30 May 1984 (aged 19)		(Uzbekistan) Buxoro
19	DF	Timur Sultanov	2 March 1984 (aged 19)		(Uzbekistan) Navbahor Namangan
20	DF	Ilhom Suyunov	17 May 1983 (aged 20)		(Uzbekistan) Mash'al Mubarek

== Group C ==
=== Australia ===
Head coach: Ange Postecoglou

No.	Pos.	Player	Date of birth (age)	Caps	Club
1	GK	**Nathan Coe**	1 June 1984 (aged 19)		(Italy) Internazionale
2	DF	Wayne Heath	28 April 1983 (aged 20)		(Australia) Brisbane Strikers
3	DF	Steve Pantelidis	17 August 1983 (aged 20)		(Australia) Melbourne Knights
4	DF	**Alex Wilkinson**	13 August 1984 (aged 19)		(Australia) Northern Spirit
5	DF	**David Tarka**	11 February 1983 (aged 20)		(England) Nottingham Forest
6	MF	**Carl Valeri**	14 August 1984 (aged 19)		(Italy) Internazionale
7	FW	Spase Dilevski	13 May 1985 (aged 18)		(Germany) Rot-Weiss Essen
8	MF	**Mile Jedinak**	3 August 1984 (aged 19)		(Croatia) Varteks
9	FW	**Scott McDonald**	21 August 1983 (aged 20)		(England) Wimbledon
10	FW	**Alex Brosque**	12 October 1983 (aged 20)		(Australia) Marconi Stallions
11	MF	**Matt McKay**	11 January 1983 (aged 20)		(Australia) Brisbane Strikers
12	FW	Anthony Danze	15 March 1984 (aged 19)		(Australia) Perth Glory
13	MF	Jonathan Richter	12 April 1983 (aged 20)		(Australia) Northern Spirit
14	MF	Massimo Murdocca	2 September 1984 (aged 19)		(Australia) South Melbourne
15	MF	Vince Lia	18 March 1985 (aged 18)		(Australia) South Melbourne
16	MF	Dustin Wells	31 May 1983 (aged 20)		(Australia) Wollongong Wolves
17	FW	Michael Baird	1 August 1983 (aged 20)		(Australia) Sydney Olympic
18	GK	Tom Willis	4 November 1983 (aged 20)		(Australia) Newcastle United
19	DF	**Michael Thwaite**	2 May 1983 (aged 20)		(Australia) Marconi Stallions
20	FW	Jobe Wheelhouse	14 April 1985 (aged 18)		(Australia) Newcastle United

=== Brazil ===
Head coach: Marcos Paqueta

No.	Pos.	Player	Date of birth (age)	Caps	Club
1	GK	**Fernando Henrique**	25 November 1983 (aged 20)		(Brazil) Fluminense
2	DF	**Dani Alves**	6 May 1983 (aged 20)		(Spain) Sevilla
3	DF	Alcides	13 March 1985 (aged 18)		(Germany) Schalke 04
4	DF	Adaílton	16 April 1983 (aged 20)		(Brazil) Vitória
5	MF	Carlos Alberto	24 January 1978 (aged 25)		(Brazil) Figueirense
6	DF	Dyego Coelho	22 March 1983 (aged 20)		(Brazil) Corinthians
7	MF	**Daniel Carvalho**	1 March 1983 (aged 20)		(Brazil) Internacional
8	MF	**Dudu Cearense**	15 April 1983 (aged 20)		(Brazil) Vitória
9	MF	Andrezinho	30 July 1983 (aged 20)		(Brazil) Flamengo
10	FW	**Nilmar**	14 July 1984 (aged 19)		(Brazil) Internacional
11	FW	Dagoberto	22 March 1983 (aged 20)		(Brazil) Atlético Paranaense
12	GK	**Jefferson**	2 January 1983 (aged 20)		(Brazil) Botafogo
13	FW	Kléber	12 August 1983 (aged 20)		(Brazil) São Paulo
14	DF	**Adriano**	26 October 1984 (aged 19)		(Brazil) Coritiba
15	MF	Juninho	11 January 1983 (aged 20)		(Brazil) Atlético Mineiro
16	MF	Jardel	27 January 1983 (aged 20)		(Brazil) Cruzeiro
17	DF	Gabriel Santos	5 March 1983 (aged 20)		(Brazil) Ponte Preta
18	DF	Renato Silva	26 July 1983 (aged 20)		(Brazil) Goiás
19	MF	**Fernandinho**	4 May 1985 (aged 18)		(Brazil) Atlético Paranaense
20	GK	Andrey	9 November 1983 (aged 20)		(Brazil) Grêmio

=== Canada ===
Head coach: Dale Mitchell

No.	Pos.	Player	Date of birth (age)	Caps	Club
1	GK	Alim Karim	20 April 1983 (aged 20)	5 (0)	(United States) Syracuse Orange
2	DF	Winston Marshall	26 February 1983 (aged 20)	8 (0)	(United States) Wright State Raiders
3	MF	**Nikolas Ledgerwood**	16 January 1985 (aged 18)	5 (0)	(Germany) 1860 Munich
4	DF	**Kevin Harmse**	4 July 1984 (aged 19)	12 (0)	(Norway) Tromsø IL
5	MF	Waldemar Dutra	20 February 1983 (aged 20)	9 (1)	(Croatia) Osijek
6	DF	Andres Arango	23 April 1983 (aged 20)	3 (0)	(Canada) Montreal Impact
7	MF	Jason DiTullio	6 January 1984 (aged 19)	12 (0)	(Canada) Montreal Impact
8	MF	Gordon Chin	26 March 1983 (aged 20)	11 (1)	(Canada) Vancouver Whitecaps
9	FW	**Iain Hume**	30 October 1983 (aged 20)	15 (5)	(England) Tranmere Rovers
10	FW	Wyn Belotte	6 May 1984 (aged 19)	11 (3)	(Poland) Wisła Kraków
11	FW	Chris Lemire	3 November 1983 (aged 20)	8 (2)	(Canada) Montreal Impact
12	MF	Francesco Bruno	31 July 1984 (aged 19)	4 (0)	(United States) Syracuse Orange
13	MF	**Atiba Hutchinson**	8 February 1983 (aged 20)	14 (0)	(Sweden) Öster
14	DF	**David Edgar**	19 May 1987 (aged 16)	4 (0)	(England) Newcastle United
15	MF	**Josh Simpson**	15 May 1983 (aged 20)	12 (1)	(United States) Portland Pilots
16	FW	Elliott Godfrey	22 February 1983 (aged 20)	4 (1)	(England) Watford
17	MF	**Sita-Taty Matondo**	28 December 1984 (aged 18)	12 (1)	(Canada) Montreal Impact
18	DF	Richard Asante	24 July 1984 (aged 19)	4 (0)	(United States) Syracuse Orange
19	GK	Tom Lindley	24 January 1985 (aged 18)	2 (0)	(England) Sheffield United
20	GK	**Josh Wagenaar**	26 February 1985 (aged 18)	2 (0)	(United States) Hartwick College

=== Czech Republic ===
Head coach: Pavel Vrba

No.	Pos.	Player	Date of birth (age)	Caps	Club
1	GK	Michal Daněk	6 July 1983 (aged 20)		(Czech Republic) Baník Ostrava
2	DF	**Václav Procházka**	8 May 1984 (aged 19)		(Czech Republic) Viktoria Plzeň
3	DF	Petr Knakal	1 February 1983 (aged 20)		(Czech Republic) Viktoria Plzeň
4	DF	**Roman Hubník**	6 June 1984 (aged 19)		(Czech Republic) Sigma Olomouc
5	DF	Radek Dosoudil	20 June 1983 (aged 20)		(Czech Republic) Sparta Prague
6	MF	**Tomáš Sivok**	15 September 1983 (aged 20)		(Czech Republic) SK České Budějovice
7	DF	Milan Zachariáš	1 October 1983 (aged 20)		(Czech Republic) Slavia Prague
8	MF	**Martin Latka**	28 September 1984 (aged 19)		(Czech Republic) Slavia Prague
9	FW	**Roman Bednář**	26 March 1983 (aged 20)		(Czech Republic) Mladá Boleslav
10	FW	Emil Rilke	19 November 1983 (aged 20)		(Czech Republic) SFC Opava
11	MF	**David Limberský**	6 October 1983 (aged 20)		(Czech Republic) Viktoria Plzeň
12	DF	Petr Šíma	25 February 1983 (aged 20)		(Czech Republic) Viktoria Plzeň
13	FW	Pavel Fořt	26 June 1983 (aged 20)		(Czech Republic) Slavia Prague
14	MF	Jan Broschinský	1 September 1985 (aged 18)		(Czech Republic) Slovan Liberec
15	MF	Jiří Bílek	4 November 1983 (aged 20)		(Czech Republic) Chmel Blšany
16	GK	**Tomáš Grigar**	1 February 1983 (aged 20)		(Czech Republic) Vítkovice
17	MF	Ladislav Volešák	7 April 1984 (aged 19)		(Czech Republic) Sparta Prague
18	MF	**Milan Petržela**	19 June 1983 (aged 20)		(Czech Republic) Drnovice
19	MF	Aleš Besta	10 April 1983 (aged 20)		(Slovakia) MŠK Žilina
20	FW	**Michal Hubník**	1 June 1983 (aged 20)		(Czech Republic) Sigma Olomouc

== Group D ==
=== Colombia ===
Head coach: Reinaldo Rueda

No.	Pos.	Player	Date of birth (age)	Caps	Club
1	GK	Miguel Solis	7 April 1983 (aged 20)		(Colombia) Cortuluá
2	DF	**José de la Cuesta**	10 February 1983 (aged 20)		(Colombia) Atlético Nacional
3	DF	**Javier Arizala**	21 April 1984 (aged 19)		(Colombia) Atlético Nacional
4	DF	**Pablo Pachón**	8 October 1983 (aged 20)		(Colombia) Independiente Santa Fe
5	MF	**Fredy Guarín**	30 June 1986 (aged 17)		(Colombia) Envigado
6	DF	**Andrés González**	8 January 1984 (aged 19)		(Colombia) América de Cali
7	FW	**Edixon Perea**	20 April 1984 (aged 19)		(Colombia) Atlético Nacional
8	MF	Harrison Otálvaro	28 February 1986 (aged 17)		(Colombia) América de Cali
9	FW	**Jaime Alfonso Ruiz**	3 January 1984 (aged 19)		(Colombia) Cortuluá
10	MF	**Macnelly Torres**	1 November 1984 (aged 19)		(Colombia) Junior Barranquilla
11	MF	**Víctor Montaño**	1 May 1984 (aged 19)		(Colombia) Millonarios
12	GK	**Héctor Landazuri**	20 August 1983 (aged 20)		(Colombia) Envigado
13	DF	Cesar Fawcett	12 August 1983 (aged 20)		(Colombia) Junior Barranquilla
14	MF	**Abel Aguilar**	6 January 1985 (aged 18)		(Colombia) Deportivo Cali
15	FW	**Oscar Briceño**	6 September 1985 (aged 18)		(Colombia) Deportes Tolima
16	MF	**Yulián Anchico**	28 May 1984 (aged 19)		(Colombia) Deportes Tolima
17	MF	**Jaime Castrillón**	5 April 1983 (aged 20)		(Colombia) Independiente Medellín
18	MF	**Farid Díaz**	20 July 1983 (aged 20)		(Colombia) Atlético Bucaramanga
19	FW	Erwin Carrillo	25 June 1983 (aged 20)		(Colombia) Unión Magdalena
20	MF	**Avimiled Rivas**	17 October 1984 (aged 19)		(Colombia) Atlético Nacional

=== Egypt ===
Head coach: Hassan Shehata

No.	Pos.	Player	Date of birth (age)	Caps	Club
1	GK	**Sherif Ekramy**	1 July 1983 (aged 20)		(Egypt) Al Ahly
2	DF	**Amir Azmy**	14 February 1983 (aged 20)		(Egypt) El-Zamalek
3	DF	Osama Ragab	15 April 1984 (aged 19)		(Egypt) Aswan
4	MF	**Hosny Abd Rabo**	1 November 1984 (aged 19)		(Egypt) Al-Ismaily
5	DF	Mohamed El Zayat	3 December 1983 (aged 19)		(Egypt) Al Ahly
6	DF	Morsy Abdel Latif	1 January 1983 (aged 20)		(Egypt) ENPPI Club
7	MF	Ali Sakr	14 June 1983 (aged 20)		(Egypt) Al Ahly
8	DF	**Ahmed Saed**	14 March 1983 (aged 20)		(Egypt) Al-Ismaily
9	FW	Rida Metwaly	25 February 1983 (aged 20)		(Egypt) Baladeyet Al-Mahalla
10	FW	Ahmed Wahed	5 January 1983 (aged 20)		(Egypt) ENPPI Club
11	DF	Ahmed Assem	6 August 1983 (aged 20)		(Egypt) Haras El-Hodood
12	MF	**Mohamed Abdelwahab**	1 October 1983 (aged 20)		(Egypt) ENPPI Club
13	MF	**Ahmed Samir Farag**	20 May 1986 (aged 17)		(Egypt) Al Ahly
14	MF	**Ahmed Fathy**	10 November 1984 (aged 19)		(Egypt) Al-Ismaily
15	MF	Hany Said Ahmed	3 June 1983 (aged 20)		(Egypt) Haras El-Hodood
16	GK	Ali Frag	2 February 1984 (aged 19)		(Egypt) Haras El-Hodood
17	FW	**Emad Moteab**	20 February 1983 (aged 20)		(Egypt) Al Ahly
18	FW	Islam Shokry	1 October 1983 (aged 20)		(Egypt) Al-Mokawloon al-Arab
19	DF	Karim Zekri	10 May 1985 (aged 18)		(Egypt) Al-Masry
20	MF	Mohamed Khafagy	26 September 1984 (aged 19)		(Egypt) El-Zamalek

=== England ===
Head coach: Les Reed

No.	Pos.	Player	Date of birth (age)	Caps	Club
1	GK	Andy Lonergan	19 October 1983 (aged 20)		(England) Preston North End F.C.
2	MF	Ben Bowditch	19 February 1984 (aged 19)		(England) Tottenham Hotspur
3	MF	Chris Carruthers	19 August 1983 (aged 20)		(England) Northampton Town
4	MF	David Fox	13 December 1983 (aged 19)		(England) Manchester United
5	DF	Steven Taylor	23 January 1986 (aged 17)		(England) Newcastle United
6	DF	Matthew Kilgallon	8 January 1984 (aged 19)		(England) Leeds United
7	FW	Jerome Thomas	23 March 1983 (aged 20)		(England) Arsenal
8	MF	Gary O'Neil	18 May 1983 (aged 20)		(England) Portsmouth
9	FW	Michael Chopra	23 December 1983 (aged 19)		(England) Newcastle United
10	MF	Darren Carter	18 December 1983 (aged 19)		(England) Birmingham City
11	FW	**James Milner**	4 January 1986 (aged 17)		(England) Leeds United
12	DF	Andrew Taylor	1 August 1986 (aged 17)		(England) Middlesbrough
13	GK	Ross Turnbull	4 January 1985 (aged 18)		(England) Middlesbrough
14	DF	Philip Ifil	18 November 1986 (aged 17)		(England) Tottenham Hotspur
15	DF	Martin Cranie	26 September 1986 (aged 17)		(England) Southampton
16	DF	**Jay McEveley**	11 February 1985 (aged 18)		(England) Blackburn Rovers
17	FW	Lee Croft	21 June 1985 (aged 18)		(England) Manchester City
18	MF	John Welsh	10 January 1984 (aged 19)		(England) Liverpool
19	FW	Eddie Johnson	20 September 1984 (aged 19)		(England) Manchester United
20	FW	Tommy Wright	28 September 1984 (aged 19)		(England) Leicester City

=== Japan ===
Head coach: Kiyoshi Okuma

No.	Pos.	Player	Date of birth (age)	Caps	Club
1	GK	**Eiji Kawashima**	20 March 1983 (aged 20)		(Japan) Omiya Ardija
2	MF	**Yūhei Tokunaga**	25 September 1983 (aged 20)		(Japan) Waseda Univ.
3	DF	Makoto Kakuda	10 July 1983 (aged 20)		(Japan) Kyoto Purple Sanga
4	MF	**Naoya Kikuchi**	24 November 1984 (aged 19)		(Japan) Júbilo Iwata
5	DF	**Mitsuru Nagata**	6 April 1983 (aged 20)		(Japan) Kashiwa Reysol
6	MF	**Yasuyuki Konno**	25 January 1983 (aged 20)		(Japan) Consadole Sapporo
7	MF	Sho Naruoka	31 May 1984 (aged 19)		(Japan) Júbilo Iwata
8	MF	**Daigo Kobayashi**	19 February 1983 (aged 20)		(Japan) Tokyo Verdy 1969
9	FW	Hiroto Mogi	2 March 1984 (aged 19)		(Japan) Sanfrecce Hiroshima
10	FW	**Daisuke Sakata**	16 January 1983 (aged 20)		(Japan) Yokohama F. Marinos
11	FW	Yutaro Abe	5 October 1984 (aged 19)		(Japan) Yokohama F. Marinos
12	GK	Masahiro Okamoto	17 May 1983 (aged 20)		(Japan) JEF United Ichihara
13	DF	**Naoya Kondo**	3 October 1983 (aged 20)		(Japan) Kashiwa Reysol
14	MF	**Satoru Yamagishi**	3 May 1983 (aged 20)		(Japan) JEF United Ichihara
15	MF	Norio Suzuki	14 February 1984 (aged 19)		(Japan) FC Tokyo
16	DF	**Yuzo Kurihara**	18 September 1983 (aged 20)		(Japan) Yokohama F. Marinos
17	FW	Yuji Unozawa	3 May 1983 (aged 20)		(Japan) Kashiwa Reysol
18	MF	Tatsuya Yazawa	3 October 1984 (aged 19)		(Japan) Kashiwa Reysol
19	FW	**Sōta Hirayama**	6 June 1985 (aged 18)		(Japan) Kunimi High School
20	MF	Kei Yamaguchi	11 June 1983 (aged 20)		(Japan) Nagoya Grampus Eight

== Group E ==
=== Ivory Coast ===
Head coach: Mama Ouattara

No.	Pos.	Player	Date of birth (age)	Caps	Club
1	GK	**Daniel Yeboah**	13 November 1984 (aged 19)		(France) Bastia
2	DF	Dan Ouehi	15 January 1984 (aged 19)		(Ivory Coast) Stade Abidjan
3	DF	Dacosta Goore	31 December 1984 (aged 18)		(Ivory Coast) ASEC Abidjan
4	DF	Ayi Ahyee	13 December 1983 (aged 19)		(Ivory Coast) Stella Club
5	DF	Arnaud Kouyo	8 April 1984 (aged 19)		(Italy) Lecce
6	DF	Armand Mahan	9 July 1983 (aged 20)		(Ivory Coast) ASEC Mimosas
7	MF	**Jean-Jacques Gosso**	15 March 1983 (aged 20)		(Morocco) Wydad Casablanca
8	FW	**Arouna Koné**	11 November 1983 (aged 20)		(Netherlands) Roda JC
9	FW	**Antonin Koutouan**	11 November 1983 (aged 20)		(France) Lorient
10	MF	Raphael Yabre	11 April 1984 (aged 19)		(Ivory Coast) Stade Abidjan
11	MF	Adolphe Tohoua	9 December 1983 (aged 19)		(Belgium) Lierse
12	DF	Jean-Martial Kipré	10 November 1984 (aged 19)		(France) Paris Saint-Germain
13	MF	**Almamy Doumbia**	25 October 1983 (aged 20)		(Italy) Sambenedettese
14	MF	Andre Saki	20 October 1985 (aged 18)		(Ivory Coast) Stade Abidjan
15	MF	Mohamed Cissé	26 September 1983 (aged 20)		(France) Stade Beaucairois
16	DF	**Sol Bamba**	13 January 1985 (aged 18)		(France) Paris Saint-Germain
17	FW	Hervé Guy	5 August 1984 (aged 19)		(France) Bastia
18	FW	François Zoko	13 September 1983 (aged 20)		(France) Nancy
19	MF	Kassiaty Labi	6 May 1984 (aged 19)		(Ivory Coast) Africa Sports
20	GK	Drissa Touré	14 January 1983 (aged 20)		(Ivory Coast) ASEC Mimosas

=== Mexico ===
Head coach: Eduardo Rergis

No.	Pos.	Player	Date of birth (age)	Caps	Club
1	GK	José Guadalupe Martínez	12 January 1983 (aged 20)		(Mexico) Tecos UAG
2	DF	Fernando López	7 February 1984 (aged 19)		(Mexico) Irapuato
3	DF	Juan de la Barrera	17 March 1983 (aged 20)		(Mexico) Irapuato
4	DF	**Joel Huiqui**	18 February 1983 (aged 20)		(Mexico) Pachuca
5	DF	Ricardo Jiménez	14 November 1984 (aged 19)		(Mexico) Mérida
6	DF	**Fausto Pinto**	8 August 1983 (aged 20)		(Mexico) Pachuca
7	DF	Adrián Cortés	19 November 1983 (aged 20)		(Mexico) Cruz Azul
8	MF	**Juan Carlos Medina**	22 August 1983 (aged 20)		(Mexico) Atlas
9	FW	**Aldo de Nigris**	22 July 1983 (aged 20)		(Mexico) UANL Tigres
10	MF	**Francisco Torres**	12 May 1983 (aged 20)		(Mexico) América
11	MF	Alvin Mendoza	27 July 1984 (aged 19)		(Mexico) América
12	GK	Jesús Urbina	3 May 1983 (aged 20)		(Mexico) UANL Tigres
13	MF	Jesús Palacios	7 February 1983 (aged 20)		(Mexico) UANL Tigres
14	MF	Oscar Zea	26 January 1983 (aged 20)		(Mexico) Necaxa
15	DF	Diego Cervantes	30 August 1984 (aged 19)		(Mexico) América
16	MF	Mario Ortiz	4 June 1983 (aged 20)		(Mexico) Cruz Azul
17	FW	David Costilla	15 February 1984 (aged 19)		(Mexico) Santos Laguna
18	MF	Juan José de la Cruz	7 April 1983 (aged 20)		(Mexico) Atlas
19	FW	Isaac Romo	23 March 1983 (aged 20)		(Mexico) Club Tijuana
20	MF	Ignacio Torres	25 September 1983 (aged 20)		(Mexico) América

=== Republic of Ireland ===
Head coach: Gerry Smith

No.	Pos.	Player	Date of birth (age)	Caps	Club
1	GK	**Wayne Henderson**	16 September 1983 (aged 20)		(England) Aston Villa
2	DF	Seán Dillon	30 July 1983 (aged 20)		(Republic of Ireland) Longford Town
3	DF	Stephen Paisley	28 July 1983 (aged 20)		(Republic of Ireland) Longford Town
4	DF	John Fitzgerald	10 February 1984 (aged 19)		(England) Blackburn Rovers
5	DF	**Stephen Kelly**	6 September 1983 (aged 20)		(England) Tottenham Hotspur
6	MF	Graham Ward	25 February 1983 (aged 20)		(England) Kidderminster Harriers
7	MF	Willo Flood	10 April 1985 (aged 18)		(England) Manchester City
8	MF	**Keith Fahey**	15 January 1983 (aged 20)		(Republic of Ireland) St. Patrick's Athletic
9	FW	**Stephen Elliott**	6 January 1984 (aged 19)		(England) Manchester City
10	MF	Michael Foley	9 March 1983 (aged 20)		(England) Liverpool
11	FW	Jon Daly	8 January 1983 (aged 20)		(England) Stockport County
12	MF	**Glenn Whelan**	13 January 1984 (aged 19)		(England) Manchester City
13	DF	Paddy McCarthy	31 May 1983 (aged 20)		(England) Manchester City
14	MF	**Darren Potter**	21 December 1984 (aged 18)		(England) Liverpool
15	DF	Stephen Capper	28 February 1983 (aged 20)		(England) Scarborough
16	GK	Brian Murphy	7 May 1983 (aged 20)		(Wales) Swansea City
17	FW	**Kevin Doyle**	18 September 1983 (aged 20)		(Republic of Ireland) Cork City
18	MF	Liam Kearney	10 January 1983 (aged 20)		(Republic of Ireland) Cork City
19	FW	**Éamon Zayed**	4 October 1983 (aged 20)		(Republic of Ireland) Bray Wanderers
20	MF	David Bell	21 January 1984 (aged 19)		(England) Rushden & Diamonds

=== Saudi Arabia ===
Head coach: (Argentina) Daniel Romeo

No.	Pos.	Player	Date of birth (age)	Caps	Club
1	GK	Hamad Al-Suwilm	24 September 1983 (aged 20)		(Saudi Arabia) Al Ittifaq
2	DF	Mesfer Al-Qahtani	15 January 1984 (aged 19)		(Saudi Arabia) Al Ittihad
3	DF	Suliman Ambdu	18 January 1983 (aged 20)		(Saudi Arabia) Al Wahda
4	MF	Mazen Al-Faraj	16 June 1984 (aged 19)		(Saudi Arabia) Al Hilal
5	MF	Abdulatif Al-Ghanam	16 July 1985 (aged 18)		(Saudi Arabia) Al Shabab
6	MF	Abdullah Al-Dossari	1 February 1983 (aged 20)		(Saudi Arabia) Al Shabab
7	MF	Abdulaziz Al-Saran	25 January 1984 (aged 19)		(Saudi Arabia) Al Shabab
8	FW	Ahmed Al-Swaileh	14 May 1986 (aged 17)		(Saudi Arabia) Al Hilal
9	FW	**Naji Majrashi**	2 February 1982 (aged 21)		(Saudi Arabia) Al Shabab
10	FW	Essa Al-Mehyani	22 June 1983 (aged 20)		(Saudi Arabia) Al Wahda
11	MF	**Ahmed Otaif**	14 April 1983 (aged 20)		(Saudi Arabia) Al Shabab
12	DF	Khalid Al-Salamah	28 September 1984 (aged 19)		(Saudi Arabia) Al Nassr
13	DF	Saad Al-Abouad	11 April 1984 (aged 19)		(Saudi Arabia) Al Ittifaq
14	GK	**Tariq Al-Hargan**	5 May 1984 (aged 19)		(Saudi Arabia) Al Shabab
15	MF	Abdoh Otaif	2 April 1984 (aged 19)		(Saudi Arabia) Al Shabab
16	MF	Mohammed Al-Mowallad	17 February 1983 (aged 20)		(Saudi Arabia) Al Ahli
17	DF	Salman Al-Khaldi	14 May 1983 (aged 20)		(Saudi Arabia) Al Qadisiya
18	MF	Abdoh Hakami	14 June 1983 (aged 20)		(Saudi Arabia) Al Qadisiya
19	DF	Osama Al-Muwallad	16 May 1984 (aged 19)		(Saudi Arabia) Al Ittihad
20	GK	**Assaf Al-Qarni**	2 April 1984 (aged 19)		(Saudi Arabia) Al Wahda

== Group F ==
=== Germany ===
Head coach: Uli Stielike

No.	Pos.	Player	Date of birth (age)	Caps	Club
1	GK	Alexander Walke	6 June 1983 (aged 20)		(Germany) Werder Bremen
2	DF	Christian Lell	29 August 1984 (aged 19)		(Germany) Bayern Munich
3	DF	Alexander Meyer	19 October 1983 (aged 20)		(Germany) Bayer Leverkusen
4	DF	**Robert Huth**	18 August 1984 (aged 19)		(England) Chelsea
5	DF	Benjamin Wingerter	25 March 1983 (aged 20)		(Germany) Schalke 04
6	DF	Michael Rundio	21 January 1983 (aged 20)		(Germany) VfB Stuttgart
7	MF	**Piotr Trochowski**	22 March 1984 (aged 19)		(Germany) Bayern Munich
8	MF	**Christian Schulz**	1 April 1983 (aged 20)		(Germany) Werder Bremen
9	FW	Sebastian Kneißl	13 January 1983 (aged 20)		(England) Chelsea
10	MF	Ioannis Masmanidis	9 March 1983 (aged 20)		(Germany) Bayer Leverkusen
11	FW	Denni Patschinsky	26 August 1983 (aged 20)		(Denmark) Viborg
12	GK	Markus Gruenberger	29 August 1984 (aged 19)		(Germany) Bayern Munich
13	DF	**Christian Pander**	28 August 1983 (aged 20)		(Germany) Schalke 04
14	DF	**Malik Fathi**	29 October 1983 (aged 20)		(Germany) Hertha BSC
15	DF	**Sofian Chahed**	18 April 1983 (aged 20)		(Germany) Hertha BSC
16	MF	Matthias Lehmann	28 May 1983 (aged 20)		(Germany) 1860 Munich
17	MF	Dennis Bührer	13 March 1983 (aged 20)		(Germany) SC Freiburg
18	MF	Patrick Milchraum	26 May 1984 (aged 19)		(Germany) Stuttgarter Kickers
19	FW	Erdal Kılıçaslan	23 August 1984 (aged 19)		(Germany) Bayern Munich
20	FW	Alexander Ludwig	31 January 1984 (aged 19)		(Germany) Hertha BSC

=== South Korea ===
Head coach: Park Sung-wha

No.	Pos.	Player	Date of birth (age)	Caps	Club
1	GK	**Kim Young-kwang**	28 June 1983 (aged 20)		(South Korea) Chunnam Dragons
2	DF	**Oh Beom-seok**	29 July 1984 (aged 19)		(South Korea) Pohang Steelers
3	DF	**Kim Chi-woo**	11 November 1983 (aged 20)		(South Korea) Chung-Ang University
4	DF	**Kim Chi-gon**	29 July 1983 (aged 20)		(South Korea) Anyang LG Cheetahs
5	DF	**Park Ju-sung**	20 February 1984 (aged 19)		(South Korea) Suwon Samsung Bluewings
6	DF	**Kim Jin-kyu**	16 February 1985 (aged 18)		(South Korea) Chunnam Dragons
7	MF	**Lee Jong-min**	1 September 1983 (aged 20)		(South Korea) Suwon Samsung Bluewings
8	MF	**Lee Ho**	22 October 1984 (aged 19)		(South Korea) Ulsan Hyundai Horangi
9	FW	**Jung Jo-gook**	23 April 1984 (aged 19)		(South Korea) Anyang LG Cheetahs
10	FW	**Choi Sung-kuk**	8 February 1983 (aged 20)		(South Korea) Ulsan Hyundai Horangi
11	MF	**Cho Won-hee**	17 April 1983 (aged 20)		(South Korea) Gwangju Sangmu Phoenix
12	GK	Sung Kyung-il	1 March 1983 (aged 20)		(South Korea) Konkuk University
13	MF	**Namkung Woong**	29 March 1984 (aged 19)		(South Korea) Suwon Samsung Bluewings
14	MF	Kwon Jip	13 February 1984 (aged 19)		(South Korea) Suwon Samsung Bluewings
15	FW	**Park Chu-young**	10 July 1985 (aged 18)		(South Korea) Cheonggu High School
16	MF	Han Jae-woong	28 September 1984 (aged 19)		(South Korea) Busan I'Cons
17	DF	**Lim You-hwan**	2 December 1983 (aged 19)		(Japan) Kyoto Purple Sanga
18	FW	**Kim Dong-hyun**	20 May 1984 (aged 19)		(Japan) Ōita Trinita
19	DF	Yeo Hyo-jin	25 April 1983 (aged 20)		(South Korea) Korea University
20	MF	Lee Ho-jin	9 March 1983 (aged 20)		(South Korea) Sungkyunkwan University

=== Paraguay ===
Head coach: Rolando Chilavert

No.	Pos.	Player	Date of birth (age)	Caps	Club
1	GK	**Antony Silva**	27 February 1984 (aged 19)		(Paraguay) Club Libertad
2	DF	**Gilberto Velásquez**	11 March 1983 (aged 20)		(Paraguay) Club Guaraní
3	DF	**Víctor Hugo Mareco**	26 February 1984 (aged 19)		(Italy) Brescia
4	DF	**Enrique Meza**	28 November 1985 (aged 17)		(Paraguay) Sol de América
5	DF	Ángel Martínez	9 October 1983 (aged 20)		(Paraguay) Olimpia Asunción
6	MF	Blas López	14 March 1984 (aged 19)		(Paraguay) Club Libertad
7	FW	**Erwin Ávalos**	27 April 1983 (aged 20)		(Paraguay) Cerro Porteño
8	MF	**Édgar Barreto**	15 July 1984 (aged 19)		(Paraguay) Cerro Porteño
9	FW	**Dante López**	16 August 1983 (aged 20)		(Israel) Maccabi Haifa
10	MF	**Julio dos Santos**	7 May 1983 (aged 20)		(Paraguay) Cerro Porteño
11	DF	**Ernesto Cristaldo**	16 March 1984 (aged 19)		(Paraguay) Cerro Porteño
12	GK	Marco Almeda	23 March 1984 (aged 19)		(Paraguay) Cerro Porteño
13	MF	Édgar Benítez	22 April 1984 (aged 19)		(Paraguay) Cerro Porteño
14	DF	Óscar Díaz	29 January 1984 (aged 19)		(Paraguay) 12 de Octubre
15	MF	Cristian Andersen	3 June 1984 (aged 19)		(Paraguay) Sportivo Luqueño
16	MF	Andrés Pérez Matto	7 February 1984 (aged 19)		(Paraguay) Olimpia Asunción
17	FW	Jesús Martínez	27 September 1983 (aged 20)		(Paraguay) Sportivo Trinidense
18	FW	Nelson Romero	18 November 1984 (aged 19)		(Paraguay) San Lorenzo
19	FW	Jorge Cáceres	16 June 1983 (aged 20)		(Paraguay) Colombia
20	FW	**Nelson Valdez**	28 November 1983 (aged 19)		(Germany) Werder Bremen

=== United States ===
Head coach: (Netherlands) Thomas Rongen

No.	Pos.	Player	Date of birth (age)	Caps	Club
1	GK	Steve Cronin	28 May 1983 (aged 20)		(United States) Santa Clara Broncos
2	DF	Zak Whitbread	4 March 1984 (aged 19)		(England) Liverpool
3	MF	**Justin Mapp**	18 October 1984 (aged 19)		(United States) Chicago Fire
4	DF	**Chad Marshall**	22 August 1984 (aged 19)		(United States) Stanford Cardinal
5	DF	Ryan Cochrane	8 August 1983 (aged 20)		(United States) Santa Clara Broncos
6	MF	Jordan Stone	16 March 1984 (aged 19)		(United States) Dallas Burn
7	FW	**Eddie Johnson**	31 March 1984 (aged 19)		(United States) Dallas Burn
8	DF	C. J. Klaas	23 August 1983 (aged 20)		(United States) Washington Huskies
9	FW	**Santino Quaranta**	14 October 1984 (aged 19)		(United States) D.C. United
10	MF	**Bobby Convey**	27 May 1983 (aged 20)		(United States) D.C. United
11	MF	**Ricardo Clark**	10 February 1983 (aged 20)		(United States) MetroStars
12	FW	**Freddy Adu**	2 June 1989 (aged 14)		(United States) IMG Soccer Academy
13	FW	Mike Magee	2 September 1984 (aged 19)		(United States) MetroStars
14	MF	**Clint Dempsey**	9 March 1983 (aged 20)		(United States) Furman Paladins
15	MF	David Johnson	16 January 1984 (aged 19)		(Netherlands) Willem II
16	DF	**Drew Moor**	15 January 1984 (aged 19)		(United States) Indiana Hoosiers
17	FW	Knox Cameron	17 September 1983 (aged 20)		(United States) Michigan Wolverines
18	GK	Ford Williams	20 February 1984 (aged 19)		(United States) North Carolina Tar Heels
19	MF	Ned Grabavoy	1 July 1983 (aged 20)		(United States) Chicago Fire Premier
20	DF	Jordan Harvey	28 January 1984 (aged 19)		(United States) UCLA Bruins
