= 2003 Toulon Tournament =

Association football tournament

Tournament details
- Host country: France
- Dates: 10–21 June
- Teams: 10 (from 5 confederations)

Final positions
- Champions: Portugal
- Runners-up: Italy
- Third place: Argentina
- Fourth place: Mexico

Tournament statistics
- Matches played: 22
- Goals scored: 61 (2.77 per match)
- Top scorer(s): (Argentina) Germán Herrera (Portugal) Luís Lourenço (Italy) Francesco Ruopolo (3 goals each)
- Best player: (Argentina) Javier Mascherano

The 2003 Toulon Tournament was the 31st edition of the Toulon Tournament, and was held from 10 to 21 June 2003. It was won by Portugal, after they beat Italy in the final.

== Results ==
=== Group A ===
==== Table ====
Pos	Team	Pld	W	D	L	GF	GA	GD	Pts	Qualification
1	Italy	4	3	1	0	9	4	+5	10	Qualified for the final
2	Mexico	4	3	0	1	9	6	+3	9	Qualified for the third place match
3	Colombia	4	2	1	1	6	4	+2	7	
4	Burkina Faso	4	1	0	3	5	7	−2	3	
5	Poland	4	0	0	4	3	11	−8	0	

Updated to match(es) played on 18 June 2003. Source: RSSSF, Toulon Tournament.

==== Match summaries ====
10 June 2003

Burkina Faso	0–2	Colombia
Acosta 44'; Anchico 79'

Stade Mayol, Toulon
Referee: Eric Braamhaar (Netherlands)
10 June 2003

Italy	3–2	Mexico
Ruopolo 11'; Paro 43'; Pagano 52'		de la Cruz Ortiz 18' de la Barrera 23'

Stade Mayol, Toulon
Referee: Mike Dean (England)

12 June 2003

Burkina Faso	4–0	Poland
Coulibaly 21'; Ouedraogo 43', 60'; Tassembedo 50'

Stade du Ray, Nice
Referee: Gerald Lehner (Austria)
12 June 2003

Italy	1–1	Colombia
Bovo 9'		Acosta 15'

Stade du Ray, Nice
Referee: Pedro Proença (Portugal)

14 June 2003

Burkina Faso	0–3	Italy
		Crocetti 27'; Ruopolo 31'; Pagano 36'

Stade de Lattre, Aubagne
Referee: Joji Kashihara (Japan)
14 June 2003

Mexico	3–1	Poland
Medina 3', 22'; Romo 38'		Brożek 33'

Stade de Lattre, Aubagne
Referee: Kuddusi Muftutoglu (Turkey)

16 June 2003

Burkina Faso	1–2	Mexico
Diallo 24'		Romo 49'; Ortiz Velásquez 76'

Stade Pourcin, Fréjus
Referee: Joji Kashihara (Japan)
16 June 2003

Colombia	2–1	Poland
Fawcett 12'; Mendoza 70'		Brożek 23'

Stade Pourcin, Fréjus
Referee: Philippe Leuba (Switzerland)

18 June 2003

Colombia	1–2	Mexico
Castrillón 44'		de la Barrera 27'; Medina 67'

Stade Scaglia, La Seyne-sur-Mer
Referee: Mike Dean (England)
18 June 2003

Italy	2–1	Poland
Berardi 65'; Quadri 73'		Romańczuk 71'

Stade Scaglia, La Seyne-sur-Mer
Referee: Kuddusi Muftutoglu (Turkey)

=== Group B ===
==== Table ====
Pos	Team	Pld	W	D	L	GF	GA	GD	Pts	Qualification
1	Portugal	4	3	0	1	8	1	+7	9	Qualified for the final
2	Argentina	4	3	0	1	11	3	+8	9	Qualified for the third place match
3	Japan	4	2	1	1	3	2	+1	7	
4	Turkey	4	1	1	2	2	5	−3	4	
5	England	4	0	0	4	0	13	−13	0	

Updated to match(es) played on 19 June 2003. Source: RSSSF, Toulon Tournament.

==== Match summaries ====
11 June 2003

Argentina	1–0	Japan
Mascherano

Stade des Costières, Nîmes
Referee: Seydou Banao (Burkina Faso)
11 June 2003

England	0–3	Portugal
	Report	Custódio 52'; Lourenço 60'; Ronaldo 76'

Stade des Costières, Nîmes
Referee: Abramo Lima (Mexico)

13 June 2003

Japan	1–1	Turkey
Abe 52'		Sağlık 38'

Stade Mayol, Toulon
Referee: Ricardo Valenzuela (United States)
13 June 2003

England	0–8	Argentina
		Charras 7'; Rivas 25'; Fernández 31', 68'; Herrera 48', 75'; Hylton 58' (o.g.); Carter 71' (o.g.)

Stade Mayol, Toulon
Referee: Paolo Bertini (Italy)

15 June 2003

England	0–1	Turkey
		Cora 29'

Stade Mayol, Toulon
Referee: Carlos Lopez Buitrago (Colombia)
15 June 2003

Argentina	0–3	Portugal
	Report	Custódio 4'; Lourenço 37', 42'

Stade Mayol, Toulon
Referee: Robert Małek (Poland)

17 June 2003

Japan	1–0	Portugal
Mogi 83'	Report

Stade Pourcin, Fréjus
Referee: Ricardo Valenzuela (United States)
17 June 2003

Argentina	2–0	Turkey
Bottinelli 30', 48'

Stade Pourcin, Fréjus
Referee: Paolo Bertini (Italy)

19 June 2003

Turkey	0–2	Portugal
	Report	Viveiros 7'; Danny 78'

Stade Scaglia, La Seyne-sur-Mer
Referee: Eric Braamhaar (Netherlands)
19 June 2003

England	0–1	Japan
		Bowditch 2' (o.g.)

Stade Scaglia, La Seyne-sur-Mer
Referee: Gerald Lehner (Austria)

== Third place match ==
21 June 2003

Argentina	1–0	Mexico
Herrera 27'

Stade Mayol, Toulon
Referee: Philippe Leuba (Switzerland)

== Final ==
21 June 2003

Portugal	3–1	Italy
Paiva 72', 80'; Danny 77'	Report	Ruopolo 68'

Stade Mayol, Toulon
Referee: Mike Dean (England)

== Awards ==
After the final, the following players were rewarded for their performances during the competition.

- Best player: (Argentina) Javier Mascherano
- Most elegant player (Second best player): (Portugal) Raul Meireles
- Most courteous player (Third best player): (Mexico) Juan Carlos Medina
- Best goalkeeper: (Portugal) Bruno Vale
- Top scorers: (Argentina) Germán Herrera, (Portugal) Luís Lourenço, (Italy) Francesco Ruopolo (3 goals each)
- Special Prize: (Italy) Francesco Ruopolo
- Younger player of the final: (Portugal) Cristiano Ronaldo
- Best goal of the tournament: (Japan) Hiroto Mogi
