= 2005 FIFA Club World Championship squads =

Here are the rosters that took part on the 2005 FIFA Club World Championship, held in Japan, between 11 December and 18 December 2005.

== Al Ahly ==
Head coach: (Portugal) Manuel José de Jesus

Note: Flags indicate national team as defined under FIFA eligibility rules; some limited exceptions apply. Players may hold more than one non-FIFA nationality.

No.	Pos.	Nation	Player
1	GK	EGY	Essam El-Hadary
2	DF	EGY	Islam El-Shater
3	DF	EGY	Mohamed Abdelwahab
4	DF	EGY	Emad El-Nahhas
5	DF	EGY	Ahmad El-Sayed
6	DF	EGY	Wael Gomaa
7	MF	EGY	Shady Mohamed
8	MF	EGY	Mohamed Barakat
9	FW	EGY	Emad Moteab
10	MF	EGY	Wael Riad
11	MF	EGY	Ahmad Hassan Stakoza
12	MF	ANG	Sebastião Gilberto
13	MF	EGY	Hossam Ashour
14	MF	EGY	Hassan Mostafa
15	DF	EGY	Ahmed Abou Moslem
16	DF	EGY	Ramy Adel
17	MF	EGY	Mohamed Shawky
18	FW	EGY	Osama Hosny
19	GK	EGY	Amir AbdulHamid
20	MF	EGY	Hady Khashaba
21	GK	EGY	Nader El-Sayed
22	MF	EGY	Mohamed Aboutrika
23	FW	ANG	Flávio Amado

== Al-Ittihad ==
Head coach: (Romania) Anghel Iordănescu

Note: Flags indicate national team as defined under FIFA eligibility rules; some limited exceptions apply. Players may hold more than one non-FIFA nationality.

No.	Pos.	Nation	Player
1	GK	KSA	Mabrouk Zaid
2	DF	KSA	Ahmed Dokhi
3	FW	SLE	Mohamed Kallon
4	DF	KSA	Redha Tukar
5	DF	KSA	Ali Al Garni
6	DF	KSA	Mesfr Al Kahtani
7	MF	KSA	Mohammed Haidar
8	MF	KSA	Manaf Abushgeer
9	FW	KSA	Hamzah Falatah
10	FW	CMR	Joseph-Désiré Job
11	MF	BRA	Tcheco
12	MF	KSA	Abdoh Hakami
13	DF	KSA	Osama Al Harbi
14	MF	KSA	Saud Khariri
15	MF	BRA	Pedrinho *
16	DF	BRA	Marcão *
17	MF	KSA	Ibrahim Suwayed
18	MF	KSA	Mohammed Noor
19	FW	BRA	Lima *
20	DF	KSA	Adnan Fallatah
21	DF	KSA	Hamad Al-Montashari
22	GK	KSA	Hussein Al-Sadiq
23	GK	KSA	Tisir Al-Antaif

- Pedrinho, Marcao and Lima were not permitted to play in 2005 FIFA Club World Championship, because Al-Ittihad acquired them after the permitted time.

== Saprissa ==
Head coach: (Costa Rica) Hernan Medford

Note: Flags indicate national team as defined under FIFA eligibility rules; some limited exceptions apply. Players may hold more than one non-FIFA nationality.

No.	Pos.	Nation	Player
1	GK	CRC	Jose Porras
2	MF	CRC	Christian Bolaños
3	DF	CRC	Victor Cordero
4	DF	CRC	Ronald Gonzalez
5	DF	CRC	Jervis Drummond
6	DF	CRC	Reynaldo Parks
7	FW	CRC	Allan Aleman
8	MF	CRC	Walter Centeno
9	MF	CRC	Pablo Brenes
10	MF	CRC	Alonso Solis
11	FW	CRC	Ronald Gomez
12	FW	CRC	Alvaro Saborio
13	DF	CRC	Juan Esquivel
14	DF	CRC	Andrés Núñez
15	MF	CRC	Saúl Phillips
16	DF	CRC	Gabriel Badilla
17	MF	CRC	José Luis López
18	GK	CRC	Fausto Gonzalez
19	MF	CRC	Randall Azofeifa
20	FW	CRC	Gerald Drummond
21	GK	CRC	Keylor Navas
22	DF	CRC	José Pablo Fonseca
23	DF	CRC	Try Bennett

== Liverpool ==
Head coach: (Spain) Rafael Benítez

Note: Flags indicate national team as defined under FIFA eligibility rules; some limited exceptions apply. Players may hold more than one non-FIFA nationality.

No.	Pos.	Nation	Player
1	GK	POL	Jerzy Dudek
2	DF	ENG	Stephen Warnock
3	DF	IRL	Steve Finnan
4	DF	FIN	Sami Hyypiä
5	DF	ENG	Danny O'Donnell *
6	MF	NOR	John Arne Riise
7	MF	AUS	Harry Kewell
8	FW	ENG	Steven Gerrard
9	FW	FRA	Djibril Cissé
10	MF	ESP	Luis García
11	FW	FRA	Florent Sinama Pongolle
12	GK	ESP	Pepe Reina **
13	GK	ENG	Scott Carson
14	MF	ESP	Xabi Alonso
15	FW	ENG	Peter Crouch
16	MF	GER	Dietmar Hamann
17	DF	ESP	Josemi
18	MF	IRL	Darren Potter *
19	FW	ESP	Fernando Morientes
20	DF	ENG	David Raven *
21	DF	MLI	Djimi Traoré
22	MF	MLI	Mohamed Sissoko
23	DF	ENG	Jamie Carragher

- Danny O'Donnell, Darren Potter and David Raven did not travel to Japan and did not play at the competition
  - Pepe Reina usually wore the number 25 shirt but was required to be assigned a squad number between 1 and 23.

== São Paulo ==
Head coach: (Brazil) Paulo Autuori

Note: Flags indicate national team as defined under FIFA eligibility rules; some limited exceptions apply. Players may hold more than one non-FIFA nationality.

No.	Pos.	Nation	Player
1	GK	BRA	Rogério Ceni (captain)
2	DF	BRA	Cicinho
3	DF	BRA	Fabão
4	DF	BRA	Edcarlos
5	DF	URU	Diego Lugano
6	DF	BRA	Júnior
7	MF	BRA	Mineiro
8	MF	BRA	Josué
9	FW	BRA	Grafite
10	MF	BRA	Danilo
11	FW	BRA	Márcio Amoroso
12	FW	BRA	Christian
13	DF	BRA	Alex Bruno
14	FW	BRA	Aloísio
15	MF	BRA	Denílson
16	DF	BRA	Fábio Santos
17	MF	BRA	Renan
18	DF	BRA	Flávio Donizete
19	FW	BRA	Thiago Ribeiro
20	MF	BRA	Richarlyson
21	MF	BRA	Souza
22	GK	BRA	Bosco
23	GK	BRA	Flávio Kretzer

== Sydney FC ==
Head coach: (Germany) Pierre Littbarski

Note: Flags indicate national team as defined under FIFA eligibility rules; some limited exceptions apply. Players may hold more than one non-FIFA nationality.

No.	Pos.	Nation	Player
1	GK	AUS	Clint Bolton
2	DF	AUS	Iain Fyfe
3	DF	AUS	Alvin Ceccoli
4	DF	AUS	Mark Rudan
5	MF	AUS	Ruben Zadkovich *
6	MF	AUS	Ufuk Talay
7	MF	AUS	Robbie Middleby
8	DF	AUS	Matthew Bingley
9	FW	AUS	David Zdrilic
10	MF	AUS	Steve Corica
11	FW	JPN	Kazuyoshi Miura
12	MF	AUS	David Carney
13	MF	AUS	Dustin Wells
14	MF	AUS	Andrew Packer
15	MF	NIR	Terry McFlynn
16	DF	AUS	Mark Milligan
17	DF	AUS	Jacob Timpano
18	DF	AUS	Wade Oostendorp
19	FW	TRI	Dwight Yorke
20	GK	AUS	Justin Pasfield
21	FW	AUS	John Buonavoglia
22	FW	AUS	Sasho Petrovski
23	GK	AUS	Mitchell Blowes

- Ruben Zadkovich was not entitled to play at the tournament.
