= Landazuri (disambiguation) =

Landazuri may refer to:

- Landazuri is a town and municipality northeastern Colombia, South America
- Héctor Landazuri (born 1983), Colombian football goalkeeper playing for Once Caldas
- Juan Landázuri Ricketts (1913 – 1997) a Peruvian cardinal
