= Kretzer =

Kretzer is a surname with German and Ashkenazic Jewish origins. Notable people with the surname include:

- Flávio Kretzer (born 1979), Brazilian footballer
- Leonor Kretzer Sullivan (1902–1988), American politician
- Max Kretzer (1854–1941), German writer
- Mia Kretzer (born 2014), Australian skateboarder

== See also ==
- Kretzmer
