= Suleyman Camara =

Ivorian football striker

Souleymane Camara
Personal information
- Full name: Souleymane Camara
- Date of birth: April 10, 1984 (age 42)
- Place of birth: Anyama, Côte d'Ivoire
- Position: Striker

Youth career
- Rio Sports

Senior career*
Years	Team	Apps	(Gls)
2004	Rio Sport d'Anyama		
2005–2008	Karvan	43	(12)
- * Club domestic league appearances and goals as of 21 November 2013

Souleymane Camara (born 10 April 1984) is an Ivorian football striker whose last known club was Karvan in the Azerbaijan Premier League.

== Career statistics ==
Club performance			League		Cup		League Cup		Total	
Season	Club	League	Apps	Goals	Apps	Goals	Apps	Goals	Apps	Goals
Azerbaijan			League		Azerbaijan Cup		League Cup		Total	
2005–06	Karvan	Azerbaijan Premier League	1	0			0	0	1	0
2006–07	Karvan	Azerbaijan Premier League	15	3			4	1	19	4
2007–08	Karvan	Azerbaijan Premier League	21	7			-		21	7
2008–09	Karvan	Azerbaijan Premier League	6	2			-		6	2
Total	Country		43	12			4	1	47	13
Career total			43	12			4	1	47	13
