= Adolphe Tohoua =

Ivorian footballer (born 1983)

Personal information
- Full name: Adolphe Tohoua
- Date of birth: December 9, 1983 (age 42)
- Place of birth: Abidjan, Ivory Coast
- Height: 1.69 m (5 ft 6 1/2 in)
- Position: Midfielder

Team information
- Current team: UCE de Liège

Youth career
- 2000–2002: Rio Sport d'Anyama

Senior career*
Years	Team	Apps	(Gls)
2002–2006	K. Lierse S.K.	72	(7)
2006–2008	R.E. Mouscron	18	(1)
2008–2010	FC Brussels	19	(1)
2010–2012	KSK Hasselt		
2012–2013	R.F.C. Tilleur St.-Gilles		
2013–2014	RRFC Montegnée		
2014–2018	RDC Cointe		
2018–2019	RFCB Sprimont		
2019–	UCE de Liège		

International career
2003	Ivory Coast U-17		
- * Club domestic league appearances and goals as of 10 December 2006

Adolphe Tohoua (born December 9, 1983) is an Ivorian footballer who plays as a midfielder for UCE de Liège. He previously played in the Belgian Jupiler League.

== Career ==
Tohoua started his career at homeland club Rio Sport d'Anyama, playing alongside Ivory Coast international, and World Cup 2006 player Arouna Koné. The pair became good friends, and in 2002, Tohoua, along with Koné, moved to Belgium to play for Lierse SK. While Koné moved on to Dutch side Roda JC at the end of the 2002–03 season, Tohoua stayed at Lierse until the end of the 2005-06 campaign, before moving to Excelsior Mouscron. In 2008, he left Mouscron after two years and joined league rival FC Brussels. In July 2010, he moved to lower league club KSK Hasselt.

== International ==
Tohoua and Koné also played alongside each other in the 2003 FIFA World Youth Championship, held in the United Arab Emirates.
