= Dieudonné Yarga =

Burkinabé footballer

Personal information
- Full name: Dieudonné Yarga
- Date of birth: February 24, 1986 (age 40)
- Place of birth: Ouagadougou, Burkina Faso
- Height: 1.82 m (6 ft 0 in)
- Position: Goalkeeper

Team information
- Current team: ASFA Yennega
- Number: 16

Senior career*
Years	Team	Apps	(Gls)
2002–	ASFA Yennega		

International career^{‡}
2003–2007	Burkina Faso U-21	24	(0)
- * Club domestic league appearances and goals ‡ National team caps and goals as of June 28, 2008

Dieudonné Yarga (born February 24, 1986) is a Burkinabé football player who currently plays for ASFA Yennega as a goalkeeper.

== Clubs ==
- 2002–present ASFA Yennega

== International ==
Yarga was member for Burkina Faso at 2003 FIFA World Youth Championship in United Arab Emirates and was member of the 2003 CAN in Egypt & Mali.
