= Kretzmer =

Kretzmer is a surname. Notable people with the surname include:

- David Kretzmer (born 1943), Israeli expert in international and constitutional law
- Herbert Kretzmer (1925–2020), English journalist and lyricist

== See also ==
- Kretzer
