= Petr Šíma =

Czech footballer (born 1983)

Personal information
- Full name: Petr Šíma
- Date of birth: 25 February 1983 (age 43)
- Place of birth: Domažlice, Czechoslovakia
- Height: 1.80 m (5 ft 11 in)
- Position: Left back

Youth career
- 1988–1994: Sokol Kout na Šumavě
- 1994–1996: Jiskra Domažlice
- 1996–1998: 1. FC Plzeň
- 1998–2002: Viktoria Plzeň

Senior career*
Years	Team	Apps	(Gls)
2002–2003	Viktoria Plzeň		
2003	→ Rokycany (loan)		
2003	Blšany		
2003–2008	Viktoria Plzeň	50	(1)
2008–	Dynamo České Budějovice	63	(1)
2011	→ Senica (loan)	4	(0)
2012	→ Zbrojovka Brno (loan)	6	(0)
2012–2013	→ Baník Sokolov (loan)	12	(0)

International career
2003	Czech Republic U-21	3	(0)
- * Club domestic league appearances and goals as of 16:06, 22 January 2013 (UTC)

Petr Šíma (born 25 February 1983 in Domažlice) is a former Czech football defender.

Šíma played for the Czech Republic at the 2003 FIFA World Youth Championship in the United Arab Emirates.
