= Islam Shokry =

Egyptian footballer (born 1983)

Personal information
- Full name: Islam Shokry Farag
- Date of birth: October 1, 1983 (age 43)
- Place of birth: Cairo, Egypt
- Height: 1.87 m (6 ft 2 in)
- Position: Striker

Team information
- Current team: Tersana

Youth career
- Arab Contractors

Senior career*
Years	Team	Apps	(Gls)
2004–2005	Arab Contractors	?	(?)
2005–2006	Ismaily	?	(?)
2006–2008	El-Olympi	?	(?)
2008– 2010	Lierse S.K.	?	(?)
2009	→ KVV Turnhout (loan)		
2010– present	Tersana		

International career
2003	Egypt U-21		
- * Club domestic league appearances and goals as of 16 September 2008

Islam Shokry (Arabic: إسلام شكري; born 1 January 1983) is an Egyptian footballer currently playing with Egyptian club Tersana. He was a member of the Egyptian U-21 youth team that won the 2003 African Youth Championship and participated in the 2003 FIFA World Youth Championship held in the UAE.

== Career ==
Shokry witnessed the golden age of Arab Contractors FC winning the 2003-04 Egyptian Cup against the African club of century Al Ahly, followed by the 2004 Egyptian Super Cup title against the other Egyptian giant Zamalek.

In August 2008, Shokry joined Lierse SK, which was competing in the Belgian Second Division at the time. He had a short spell with Lierse SK in Belgium. Although he managed to score many goals in the pre-seasons, he had tough time getting regular first-time football competing the team's captain Jurgen Cavens and former Fulham F.C. striker Tomasz Radzinski. So he moved on loan to K.V. Turnhout for the rest of the 2008–09 season. Scoring a debut goal and following it with many other goals.

In January 2010, Shokry joined Tersana.

== Honors ==
=== Arab Contractors FC ===
- Egyptian Cup: the 2003–04
- Egyptian Super Cup: 2004

=== Egypt ===
- African Youth Championship: 2003
