= Ángel Lombardo =

Panamanian footballer (born 1983)

Personal information
- Date of birth: 13 February 1983 (age 43)
- Place of birth: Panama City, Panama
- Position: Midfielder

Senior career*
Years	Team	Apps	(Gls)
- C.D. Plaza Amador
- San Francisco F.C.
2010	C.D. Plaza Amador	11	(1)
2010/2011	Unión Deportivo Universitario	8	(0)
2010/11-2013/14	C.D. Plaza Amador	66	(14)

International career
2004-2005	Panama	6	(0)
- * Club domestic league appearances and goals

Ángel Lombardo (born 13 February 1983 in Panama) is a Panamanian retired footballer.

== Career ==
In 2013, Lombardo suffered went into a coma for a month due to a car accident, causing him to retire despite recovering enough to play football a year later.
