= José Pablo Fonseca =

Costa Rican footballer (born 1973)

Personal information
- Full name: José Pablo Fonseca Díaz
- Date of birth: 25 November 1973 (age 52)
- Place of birth: Costa Rica
- Height: 1.70 m (5 ft 7 in)
- Position: Defender

Senior career*
Years	Team	Apps	(Gls)
1991–1999	Saprissa		
1995–1996	Belén		
- Municipal Liberia
2002–2003	Cartaginés		
2005–2007	Saprissa	22	(0)
2007–2008	UCR	8	(2)
2008–2010	Ramonense	39	(3)

International career^{‡}
1996–2000	Costa Rica	4	(0)
- * Club domestic league appearances and goals ‡ National team caps and goals as of 1 July 2014

José Pablo Fonseca Díaz (born November 25, 1973) is a retired Costa Rican footballer.

== Club career ==
Fonseca had played almost his entire career for Saprissa, where he debuted at the young age of 18 years. He was also played for other Costa Rican teams such as A.D. Belén, Municipal Liberia and C.S. Cartaginés, only to return to Saprissa three years ago when asked by coach Hernan Medford.

With Saprissa, Fonseca won five national championships and three CONCACAF Champions' Cup. He was also part of the squad that played the 2005 FIFA Club World Championship Toyota Cup, where Saprissa finished third behind São Paulo and Liverpool. That makes him one of the most title-winning soccer players in Costa Rica's and Saprissa's history.

He retired in June 2010 when at Ramonense.

== International career ==
Fonseca made his debut for Costa Rica in a November 1996 friendly match against Panama and has earned a total of 4 caps, scoring 0 goals. He has represented his country in 1 FIFA World Cup qualification match

His final international was an August 2000 friendly match against Venezuela.
