= Armand Mahan =

Ivorian footballer

Personal information
- Full name: Armand Mondakan Mahan
- Date of birth: 7 September 1983 (age 43)
- Place of birth: Abidjan, Ivory Coast
- Height: 1.69 m (5 ft 7 in)
- Positions: Defender; midfielder

Youth career
- ASEC Mimosas

Senior career*
Years	Team	Apps	(Gls)
2003–2007	SK Beveren	100	(2)
2007–2008	Cercle Brugge	6	(0)
- * Club domestic league appearances and goals as of 9 December 2007 ‡ National team caps and goals as of 5 September 2007

Armand Mahan (born 7 September 1983) is an Ivorian professional association football player. He is usually positioned as a left back or left winger.

== Career ==
Mahan played during his youth for ASEC Mimosas. He moved to Belgium in 2003, when he signed a contract with SK Beveren who worked together with the Ivorian team via the Frenchman Jean-Marc Guillou. Several other more famous players made this same move, such as Emmanuel Eboué, Arthur Boka, Romaric and Yaya Touré.

In the Jupiler League 2006-07 season, SK Beveren ended 18th and last in the league. As a result, they were relegated to the Belgian Second Division. Mahan, being end of contract at Beveren, was offered a contract by Cercle Brugge about two weeks after the end of the season, a contract which he accepted. This way, despite relegation, Mahan still played at the highest level of Belgian football. However, at the end of the 2007-08 season, he was given a free transfer.
