= Héctor Landázuri =

Colombian footballer (born 1983)

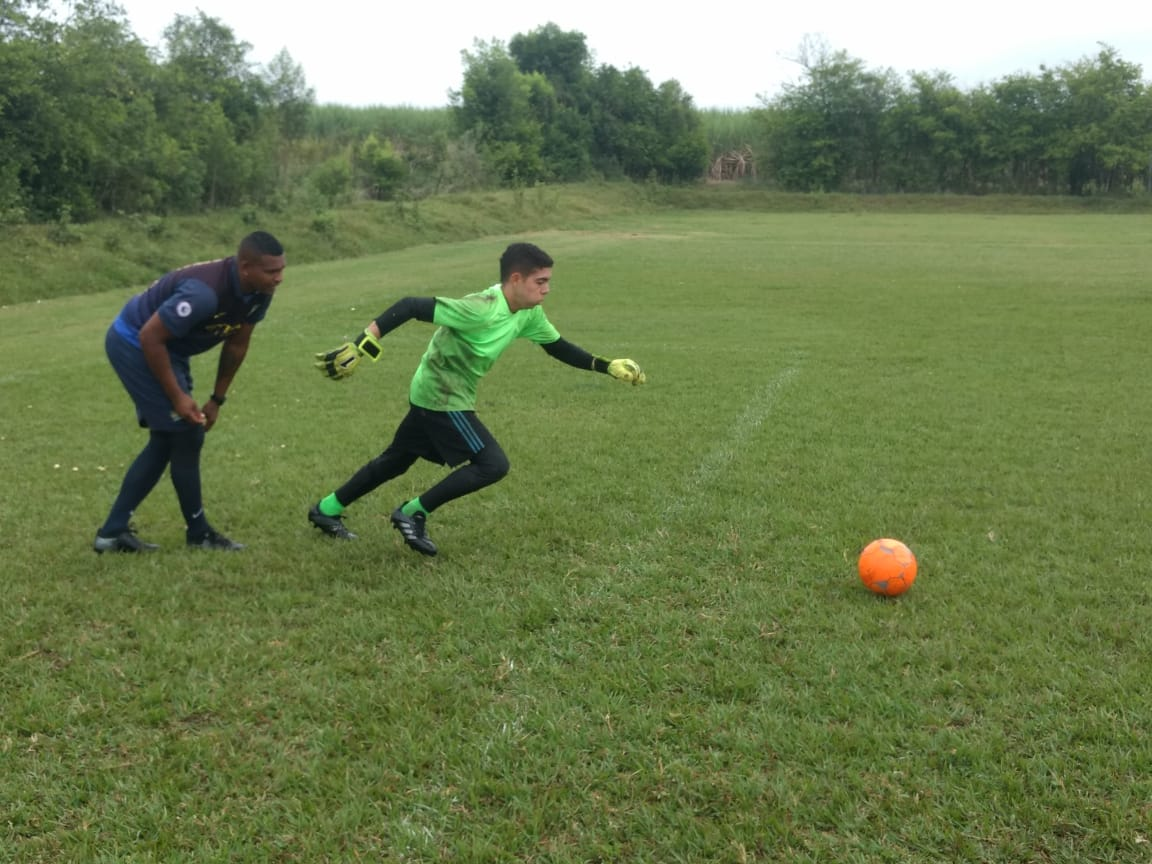

Personal information
- Full name: Héctor Fabio Landázuri
- Date of birth: August 20, 1983 (age 43)
- Place of birth: Cali, Colombia
- Height: 1.83 m (6 ft 0 in)
- Position: Goalkeeper

Team information
- Current team: Boyacá Chicó
- Number: 1

Senior career*
Years	Team	Apps	(Gls)
2004	Envigado	17	(0)
2005–2010	Once Caldas	126	(0)
2011	Atlético Bucaramanga	13	(0)
2012	La Paz	6	(0)
2013–	Boyacá Chicó	6	(0)

International career
2003	Colombia U20	7	(0)
2007	Colombia	1	(0)
- * Club domestic league appearances and goals as of April 24, 2013

Héctor Fabio Landázuri (born 20 August 1983) is a Colombian football goalkeeper currently playing for Boyacá Chicó in the Categoría Primera A.

== International career ==
He has played for the Colombian NT and started in the 2003 Sub-20 World Cup where Colombia finished in 3rd place by beating Argentina 2–1. He was also a member of the Colombian sub-17, sub-20 and the senior Colombia national team during the friendly against Panama were Colombia won 4–0.
