= Mesfer Al-Qahtani =

Saudi Arabian footballer (born 1984)

Personal information
- Full name: Mesfer Al-Qahtani
- Date of birth: January 15, 1984 (age 42)
- Place of birth: Riyadh, Saudi Arabia
- Height: 1.70 m (5 ft 7 in)
- Position: Defender

Youth career
- Al-Shabab

Senior career*
Years	Team	Apps	(Gls)
2002–2003	Al-Shabab		
2003–2008	Al-Ittihad		(1)
2008–2009	Al-Hilal	5	(0)
2010–2011	Al-Najma SC		

International career
2003	Saudi Arabia U20	1	(0)
- * Club domestic league appearances and goals

Mesfer Al-Qahtani (Arabic: مسفر القحطاني; born 15 January 1984) is a Saudi Arabian footballer who played as a defender in the Saudi Premier League. He initially played for Al-Shabab before joining Al-Ittihad. During the 2002–03 Saudi Premier League season, on 25 March 2003 he scored against Al-Riyadh.

While playing for Al-Ittihad he made one appearance for the Saudi Arabia national under-20 football team at the 2003 FIFA World Youth Championship. He also appeared in the third place match of the 2005 FIFA Club World Championship against Deportivo Saprissa in Yokohama, Japan.

Later he briefly played for Al-Hilal before retiring in 2009.
