= RRFC Montegnée =

- Full name: Royal Racing Football Club Montegnée
- Founded: 1915
- Dissolved: 2014
- Ground: Joseph Vanstraelen, Saint-Nicolas, Liège, Belgium

Royal Racing Football Club Montegnée was a Belgian association football club from the municipality of Saint-Nicolas, Liège. It last played in the 8th tier Liège Division 4, in the Belgian league system.

== History ==
Racing Football Club Montegnée was founded in 1915, it received the matricule number 77. It first appeared in the second division in 1923. In 1925 it was relegated to the third division but it came back four years later and won the second division that season. The club then played its only season at the highest level in Belgian football finishing 13th on 14 (before R.S.C. Anderlecht). Montegnée then spent some seasons in the second division until 1938 (except in 1933–34) when it was relegated to the third division again. The club would never come back at the highest two levels.

It was awarded the Royal Stamp in 1952 and became Royal Racing Football Club Montegnée.

After a new appearance in Third Division, the club was relegated two consecutive seasons to the Liége Provincial league. But RRFC Montegnée promoted to the national Promotion D league on 6 June 2010, with a 5–0 playoff final win against FC Herk. However they were relegated back to the Liège leagues in 2011 for finishing 14th out of 16 in Promotion D. They spent their final season, through demotion, in the bottom division after one season each in the top two. In June 2014 Montegnée merged with Royal Ans Football Club (matricule number 617) because of their and Ans' financial problems to become Royal Ans-Montegnée FC, receiving the number 9638. Both clubs ceased to exist and their matricule numbers were expunged. The new club is now playing in Liège's fourth and bottom division.
