= Tariq Al-Hargan =

Saudi Arabian footballer

Tariq Al-Harqan
Personal information
- Date of birth: 4 November 1984 (age 41)
- Place of birth: Saudi Arabia
- Position: Goalkeeper

Senior career*
Years	Team	Apps	(Gls)
2003–2005	Al Shabab	-	(-)

International career
2003	Saudi Arabia Under-20	2	(0)
2004	Saudi Arabia	1	(0)
- * Club domestic league appearances and goals

Tariq Al Harqan (Arabic:طارق الحرقان) is a Saudi football goalkeeper who played for Saudi Arabia in the 2004 Asian Cup. He also played for Al Shabab.
