= Hamado Ouedraogo =

Burkinabé footballer (born 1983)

Hamado Ouédraogo
Personal information
- Full name: Hamado Kassi Ouédraogo
- Date of birth: 17 March 1983 (age 43)
- Place of birth: Ouagadougou, Upper Volta
- Height: 1.82 m (6 ft 0 in)
- Position: Midfielder

Youth career
- 1999–2001: ASFA Yennega

Senior career*
Years	Team	Apps	(Gls)
2001–2003	ASFA Yennega	28	(3)
2003–2004	KSC Lokeren	5	(0)
2004–2005	Besançon RC	28	(8)
2005–2007	CA Bastia	35	(22)
2007–2009	AS Beauvais	37	(18)
2009	Arles-Avignon		
2009–2010	AFC Compiègne		
2010	Moulins	16	(4)
2010–2011	Orléans	16	(0)
2011–2012	JA Drancy	15	(1)
2012–2013	Jura Sud	34	(10)
2013–2015	AS Beauvais	17	(0)

International career
2003–2009	Burkina Faso	2	(0)
- * Club domestic league appearances and goals

Hamado Kassi Ouédraogo (born 17 March 1983) is a Burkinabé former professional footballer who played as a midfielder.

== Club career ==
Ouédraogo began his career with ASFA Yennega and was 2003 transferred to KSC Lokeren. He played five matches for Lokeren.

In the 2003–04 season and joined French side Besançon RC in July 2004. Ouédraogo played for Besançon RC in the Championnat National 28 games, scoring 8 goals. In summer 2005, he signed with CA Bastia. He played 35 matches in two years, scoring 22 goals for Bastia in the Championnat de France amateur, his contract ended in June 2007 and he moved as free agent to AS Beauvais Oise. In his first year with AS Beauvais Oise he played 37 games and scored 18 goals in the Championnat National.

== International career ==
Ouedraogo made two appearances for the Burkina Faso national team. He was a member of the Burkinabé 2003 FIFA World Youth Championship team in United Arab Emirates.
