= Arouna Koné =

Ivorian footballer

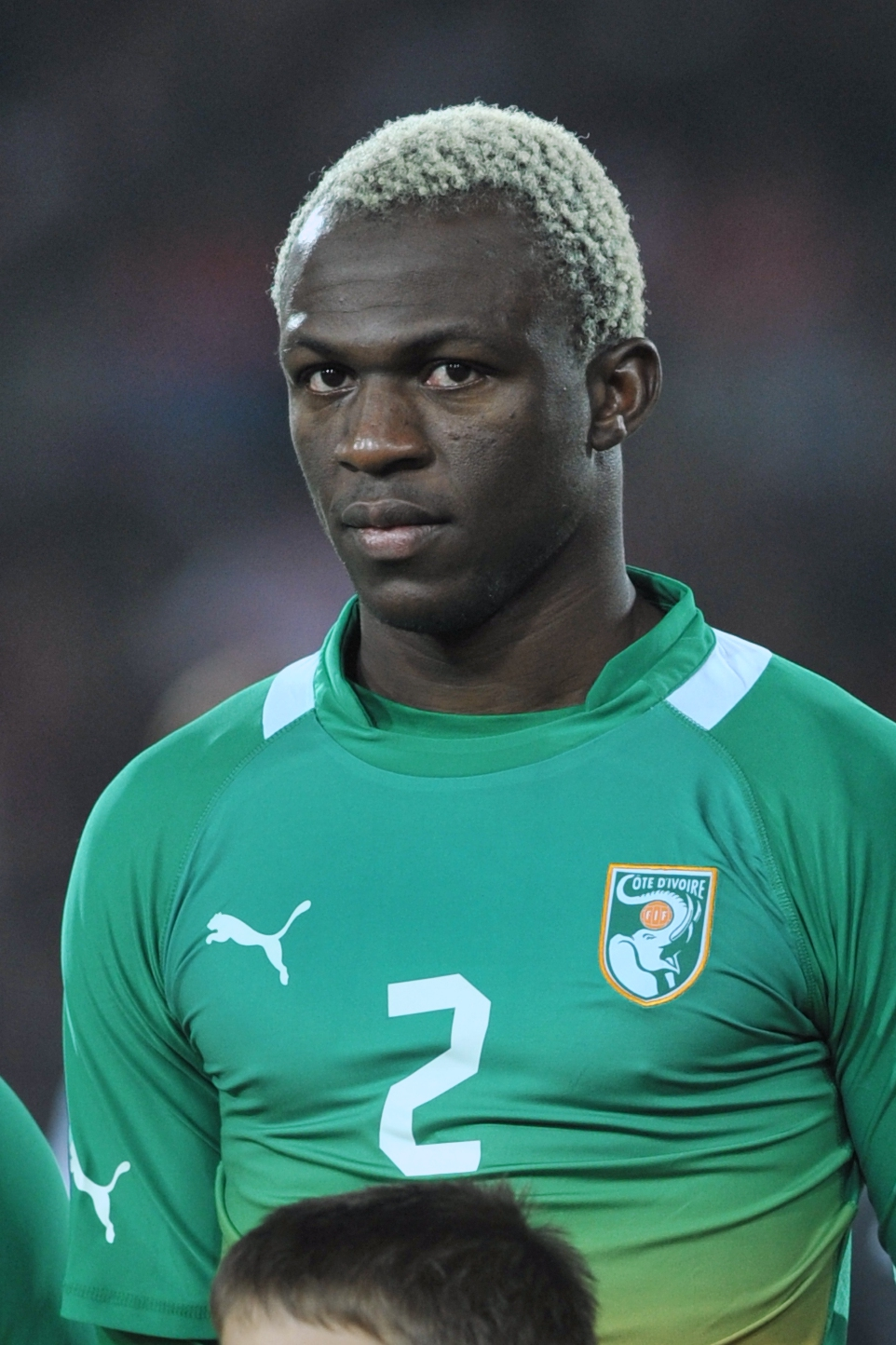
- Koné with Ivory Coast in 2012

Personal information
- Full name: Arouna Koné
- Date of birth: 11 November 1983 (age 43)
- Place of birth: Anyama, Ivory Coast
- Height: 1.81 m (5 ft 11 in)
- Position: Striker

Youth career
- Rio Sport

Senior career*
Years	Team	Apps	(Gls)
2001–2002	Rio Sport	30	(17)
2002–2003	Lierse	32	(11)
2003–2005	Roda JC	63	(27)
2005–2007	PSV	53	(21)
2007–2012	Sevilla	40	(1)
2010	→ Hannover 96 (loan)	8	(2)
2011–2012	→ Levante (loan)	34	(15)
2012	Levante	0	(0)
2012–2013	Wigan Athletic	34	(11)
2013–2017	Everton	47	(6)
2017–2022	Sivasspor	109	(32)
2022–2023	VK Weerde		

International career^{‡}
2004–2013	Ivory Coast	39	(9)
- * Club domestic league appearances and goals as of 28 January, 2024 ‡ National team caps and goals as of 28 January, 2024

Arouna Koné (born 11 November 1983) is an Ivorian former professional footballer who played as a striker.

After making a name for himself in the Eredivisie, with Roda JC and PSV, he signed with Sevilla in 2007, where he rarely appeared due to injury. In 2012, he moved from Levante to the Premier League, where he represented Wigan Athletic and Everton, winning the FA Cup with the former.

Koné played internationally for the Ivory Coast national team from his debut in 2004 until retirement in 2013. He appeared at the 2006 FIFA World Cup, as well as three Africa Cup of Nations for his country, earning a total of 39 caps and scoring 9 goals.

== Club career ==
=== PSV ===
Koné endured a difficult start to PSV's 2007–08 season: due to a date mix-up, he returned late to pre-season training following a holiday in his country, thus missing out on valuable time to prepare for the new campaign. Added to this, the player was struck down with malaria at the end of July 2007, In August, it was announced that he had returned to training following his health scare, and was expected to be fit in time for the team's first league game against Heracles Almelo on the 19 July; he also immediately returned to international duty.

=== Sevilla ===
On 30 August 2007, after reported interest from English Premier League side Middlesbrough, Sevilla signed Koné on a five-year deal for a reported €12 million transfer fee. He made his Liga debut on 16 September as a second-half substitute for Frédéric Kanouté in a 4–1 win against Recreativo de Huelva – he won a penalty in the game, but fellow striker Aleksandr Kerzhakov failed to convert. Nine days later, he scored his first goal for the Spaniards, helping the team come from behind 0–2 against Espanyol to tie it 2–2 in an eventual 2–3 home loss. On 2 October, he netted his first UEFA Champions League goal for the club in a 4–2 group stage win against Slavia Prague after just ten minutes on the pitch.

In April 2008, it was reported that Koné was to be shown the door at Sevilla in the summer of 2008 after a disappointing first season. His lack of playing time, partly due to the form of strikers Luís Fabiano and Kanouté, and an argument on the training ground with a member of the training staff that was caught on Spanish television, made for some intense speculation about the player's future. In the run-up to the 2008–09 campaign, he suffered a serious injury while playing for the Ivory Coast against Guinea on 20 August, and a subsequent scan showed he had suffered a cruciate knee ligament injury in his left leg. He underwent surgery to repair the damage the following week, returning to training in February 2009.

Koné subsequently fell out of favour at Sevilla and, after much transfer speculation, in February 2010 he joined Bundesliga club Hannover 96 on loan until the end of the season.

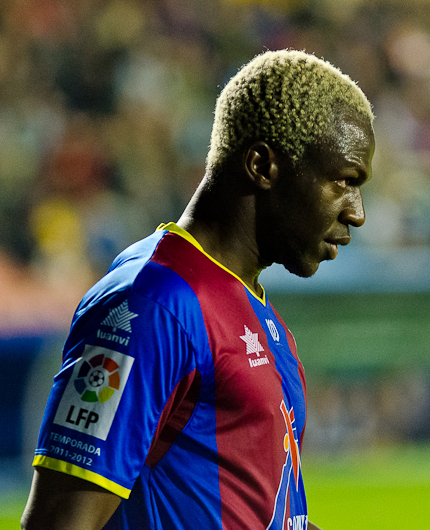
Koné in Levante colours.

Koné only appeared once for Sevilla in 2010–11, playing one minute against Villarreal. For the following season, he was loaned to Levante, starting often and scoring his first goal of the campaign on 18 September 2011 in a surprise 1–0 home win over Real Madrid.

Koné was rested for the final three games of the season due to a minor injury, and also because he was "scoring too many goals", as if he reached 18 he would have to return to Sevilla automatically, something he did not desire. Instead, he moved to Levante on a permanent basis, though the club were reported to be keen to sell him immediately for a profit.

=== Wigan Athletic ===
On 14 August 2012, Koné signed a three-year contract with English side Wigan Athletic, for a reported fee of €3.5 million. Wigan beat off competition from a number of other English clubs, with the striker being persuaded to sign due to the team's passing style of play. He scored his first league goal in his second match and his first start, an 89th-minute strike against Southampton for the final goal in a 0–2 away win. He netted a brace in a 4–1 defeat of Huddersfield Town in the fifth round of the FA Cup on 17 February 2013, and added another two in his side's next match, a 0–3 league win over Reading.

Koné won the FA Cup with the ''Latics'', featuring the full 90 minutes in a 1–0 upset against Manchester City. Only three days later, however, Wigan were relegated from the top division following a 4–1 defeat against Arsenal.

=== Everton ===
On 8 July 2013, Everton confirmed the signing of Koné on a three-year deal for an undisclosed fee. He made his debut on 17 August, coming on as an 81st-minute substitute in a 2–2 draw against Norwich City. In October, he suffered a knee cartilage injury and did not play again for the rest of the season. Returning on 24 December 2014, he netted his first goal for Everton against Newcastle United in the early stages of a 3–2 defeat. On the opening day of the 2015–16 Premier League season, Koné came off the bench to assist and score to help Everton secure a 2–2 draw against Watford. His performance was rewarded with a start away to Southampton, in a 0–3 win in which the Ivorian recorded an assist. Koné then continued his impressive start to the season, excelling in Everton's 3–1 win over Chelsea. He scored his first Everton hat-trick in their 6–2 victory over Sunderland on 1 November 2015. Kone was released by Everton at the end of the 2016–17 season.

=== Sivasspor ===
Koné signed a two-year contract with Turkish Süper Lig club Sivasspor on 4 July 2017. He made his first appearance for the team on 12 August against Akhisarspor, who were defeated 1–0 in the first matchday. He scored his first goal for the team against Yeni Malatyaspor, who they faced in the second round of the league on 19 August; a match they won 2–0. On 5 November 2017, he scored two goals against Konyaspor, securing a 2–1 win for his team. Koné scored 13 goals in the 2017–18 season, and scored another 11 goals in the 2018–19 season, becoming the team's top scorer.

=== VK Weerde ===
In July 2022, Koné signed a contract with Belgian ninth tier club VK Weerde. After six months with the team the veteran attacker retired from the game.

== International career ==
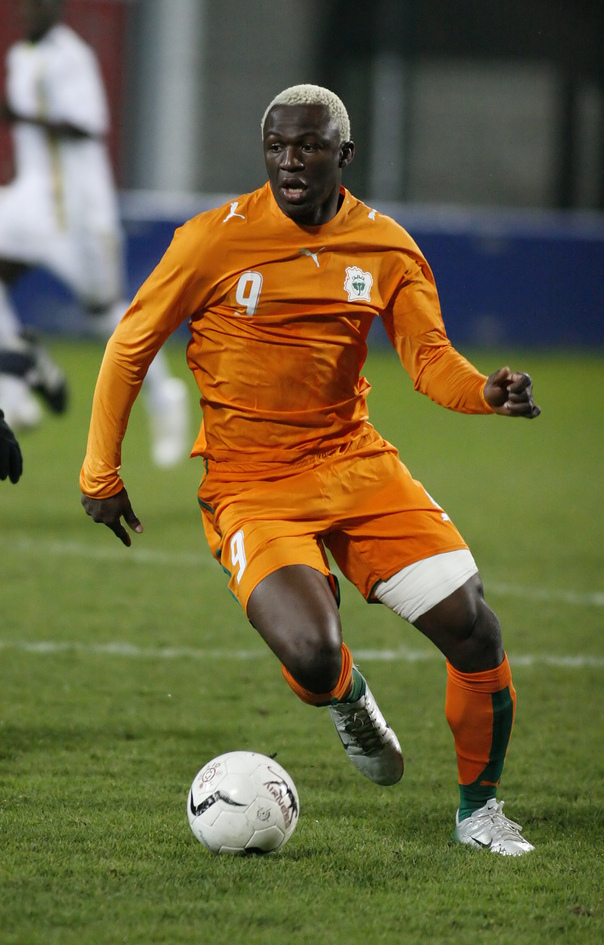
Koné playing for Ivory Coast in 2007.

Koné played for the Mama Ouattara-led Ivory Coast under-20 team in the 2003 FIFA World Youth Championship, where he starred alongside Lierse teammate Adolphe Tohoua. He scored three goals in the tournament – once against Mexico in a 2–1 win, and twice in the 2–2 draw against the Republic of Ireland – in an eventual round-of-16 exit, and the official FIFA website declared him to be a "crucial pivot for the attacking thrust" of the Ivorian team, and described him as a player possessing "physical strength, aerial ability and good ball control".

Koné was also picked for the squad that appeared at the 2006 FIFA World Cup in Germany, a first-ever for the African nation. He replaced Abdul Kader Keïta in the 77th minute of the first game, a 1–2 loss against Argentina, and started in the other two – going scoreless in the process – as the national team did not make it to the knockout stages.

After spending four years in the international wilderness due to injuries and loss of form, Koné was recalled to the Ivorian squad in 2012 and was named in the squad for the 2013 African Cup of Nations due to his club form at Wigan, with boss Roberto Martínez commenting on his player's international return, "Arouna had a long period when he wasn't involved with the national team, and that was hard because he loves representing his country. When he is happy, we are happy, and I am very pleased he is back in the Ivory Coast squad."

== Personal life ==
Koné is married and has two sons and three daughters. He is a Muslim, and his father died when he was nine years old.

Koné attributes his peroxide blonde hair to former basketball player Dennis Rodman, and states that his footballing heroes were Liberian legend George Weah and Brazilian superstar Ronaldo.

== Career statistics ==
=== Club ===
As of match played 16 March 2021

Appearances and goals by club, season and competition
Club	Season	League			National cup (Note: Includes Belgian Cup, KNVB Cup, Copa del Rey, FA Cup, Turkish Cup)		League cup (Note: Includes Football League Cup)		Continental		Other		Total	
Club	Season	Division	Apps	Goals	Apps	Goals	Apps	Goals	Apps	Goals	Apps	Goals	Apps	Goals
Rio Sport	2001	Ivorian Ligue 2	12	6	—		—		—		—		12	6
Rio Sport	2002	Ivorian Ligue 1	18	11	—		—		—		—		18	11
Rio Sport	Total		30	17	—		—		—		—		30	17
Lierse	2002–03	Belgian First Division	32	11	2	0	—		—		—		34	11
Roda JC	2003–04	Eredivisie	28	11	0	0	—		—		—		28	11
Roda JC	2004–05	Eredivisie	33	14	0	0	—		—		—		33	14
Roda JC	2005–06	Eredivisie	2	2	0	0	—		—		—		2	2
Roda JC	Total		63	27	0	0	—		—		—		63	27
PSV	2005–06	Eredivisie	21	11	3	0	—		2 (Note: Appearances in UEFA Champions League)	0	0	0	26	11
PSV	2006–07	Eredivisie	31	10	4	3	—		9	2	1 (Note: Appearance in Johan Cruyff Shield)	0	45	15
PSV	2007–08	Eredivisie	1	0	0	0	—		0	0	0	0	1	0
PSV	Total		53	21	7	3	—		11	2	1	0	72	26
Sevilla	2007–08	La Liga	21	1	1	0	—		3	1	—		25	2
Sevilla	2008–09	La Liga	6	0	0	0	—		—		—		6	0
Sevilla	2009–10	La Liga	12	0	2	0	—		3	0	—		17	0
Sevilla	2010–11	La Liga	1	0	0	0	—		0	0	0	0	1	0
Sevilla	Total		40	1	3	0	—		6	1	0	0	49	2
Hannover 96 (loan)	2009–10	Bundesliga	8	2	0	0	—		—		—		8	2
Levante (loan)	2011–12	La Liga	34	15	5	2	—		—		—		39	17
Wigan Athletic	2012–13	Premier League	35	11	4	2	0	0	—		—		38	13
Everton	2013–14	Premier League	5	0	0	0	1	0	—		—		6	0
Everton	2014–15	Premier League	12	1	0	0	0	0	4 (Note: Appearances in UEFA Europa League)	0	—		16	1
Everton	2015–16	Premier League	25	5	2	2	4	0	—		—		31	7
Everton	2016–17	Premier League	5	0	1	0	2	2	—		—		8	2
Everton	Total		47	6	3	2	7	2	4	0	—		61	10
Sivasspor	2017–18	Süper Lig	33	13	0	0	—		—		—		33	13
Sivasspor	2018–19	Süper Lig	26	10	1	1	—		—		—		27	11
Sivasspor	2019–20	Süper Lig	29	7	4	0	—		—		—		33	7
Sivasspor	2020–21	Süper Lig	21	2	3	0	—		5	2	—		29	4
Sivasspor	Total		109	32	8	1	—		5	2	—		122	35
Career total			450	143	34	10	7	2	26	5	1	0	513	162

=== International ===
Appearances and goals by national team and year
National team	Year	Apps	Goals
Ivory Coast	2004	5	0
Ivory Coast	2005	3	1
Ivory Coast	2006	16	4
Ivory Coast	2007	6	4
Ivory Coast	2008	5	0
Ivory Coast	2009	1	0
Ivory Coast	2012	2	0
Ivory Coast	2013	2	0
Total		40	9

Scores and results list Ivory Coast's goal tally first, score column indicates score after each Koné goal.

List of international goals scored by Arouna Koné
No.	Date	Venue	Opponent	Score	Result	Competition	Ref.
1	12 November 2005	Stade Léon-Bollée, Le Mans, France	Romania	1–0	2–1	Friendly	
2	28 January 2006	Cairo International Stadium, Cairo, Egypt	Egypt	1–1	1–3	2006 Africa Cup of Nations	
3	8 October 2006	Felix Houphouet Boigny Stadium, Abidjan, Ivory Coast	Gabon	2–0	5–0	2008 Africa Cup of Nations qualification	
4	8 October 2006	Felix Houphouet Boigny Stadium, Abidjan, Ivory Coast	Gabon	4–0	5–0	2008 Africa Cup of Nations qualification	
5	8 October 2006	Felix Houphouet Boigny Stadium, Abidjan, Ivory Coast	Gabon	5–0	5–0	2008 Africa Cup of Nations qualification	
6	3 June 2007	Stade de la Paix, Bouaké, Ivory Coast	Madagascar	2–0	5–0	2008 Africa Cup of Nations qualification	
7	3 June 2007	Stade de la Paix, Bouaké, Ivory Coast	Madagascar	4–0	5–0	2008 Africa Cup of Nations qualification	
8	21 November 2007	Jassim bin Hamad Stadium, Al Rayyan, Qatar	Qatar	–	6–1	Friendly	
9	21 November 2007	Jassim bin Hamad Stadium, Al Rayyan, Qatar	Qatar	–	6–1	Friendly	

== Honours ==
PSV

- Eredivisie: 2005–06, 2006–07

Sevilla

- Copa del Rey: 2009–10

Wigan Athletic

- FA Cup: 2012–13

Sivasspor

- Turkish Cup: 2021–22

Ivory Coast

- Africa Cup of Nations runner-up: 2006
