= Denni Patschinsky =

Danish footballer (born 1983)

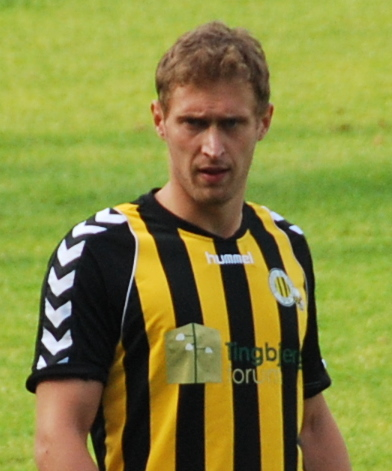

Personal information
- Date of birth: 26 August 1983 (age 43)
- Place of birth: Esbjerg, Denmark
- Position: Forward

Senior career*
Years	Team	Apps	(Gls)
2002-2005	Viborg	8	(0)
2004–2005	→ Eintracht Braunschweig (loan)	30	(2)
2005–2006	TuS Koblenz	12	(0)
2006	→ Kickers Emden (loan)	10	(1)
2006–2009	Skive	11	(0)
2009–2010	Hvidovre	22	(0)
2010–2011	Vanløse		
2011–2012	Brønshøj	8	(1)
2012	Søllerød-Vedbæk		

International career
2002–2004	Germany U20	6	(0)
2004	Germany U21	1	(1)
- * Club domestic league appearances and goals

Denni Patschinsky (born 26 August 1983) is a former professional footballer who played as a forward. Born in Denmark, Patschinsky has a German father and represented Germany at youth level.

== Career ==
Despite offers from VfL Wolfsburg in the German Bundesliga, Patschinsky remained with Danish top flight side Viborg FF until 2004.

At the 2003 FIFA World Youth Championship, he represented Germany through his German father even though he was not considered good enough for the Denmark under-20 national team.

After that, Patschinsky played for German third division clubs Eintracht Braunschweig, TuS Koblenz and Kickers Emden but returned to the Danish lower leagues due to injury.
