= Salem Abdullah (footballer, born 1984) =

Emirati footballer

Personal information
- Full name: Salem Abdullah Rashid Al Hammadi
- Date of birth: 18 January 1984 (age 42)
- Place of birth: United Arab Emirates
- Height: 1.84 m (6 ft 1/2 in)
- Position: Goalkeeper

Youth career
- Al Shabab

Senior career*
Years	Team	Apps	(Gls)
2005–2017	Al Shabab		
2006–2008	→ Al Nasr (loan)		
2017–2018	Al-Wasl		
2019–2020	Masfout		
2020–2022	Masafi		
2022–2023	Al-Hamriyah		
2023–2024	Masafi		
- * Club domestic league appearances and goals

Salem Abdullah (Arabic:سالم عبد الله) (born 18 February 1984) is an Emirati footballer. He currently plays as a goalkeeper.
