= José de la Cuesta =

Colombian footballer (born 1983)

Personal information
- Full name: José Julián de la Cuesta Herrera
- Date of birth: 10 February 1983 (age 43)
- Place of birth: Medellín, Colombia
- Height: 1.84 m (6 ft 1/2 in)
- Position: Centre back

Senior career*
Years	Team	Apps	(Gls)
1998–2001	Atlético Nacional	41	(5)
2002	Austria Wien	1	(0)
2002	→ Untersiebenbrunn (loan)		
2003	Atlético Nacional	7	(0)
2004–2010	Cádiz	83	(6)
2006–2007	→ Valladolid (loan)	10	(2)
2010–2011	Albacete	27	(1)
2014–2015	Santa Fe	33	(1)
2016	Once Caldas	19	(3)
2018	Deportivo Pasto	14	(0)

International career
2003	Colombia U20	7	(1)
2005–2006	Colombia	8	(0)
- * Club domestic league appearances and goals as of 30 September 2018

José Julián de la Cuesta Herrera (born 10 February 1983) is a Colombian former professional footballer who played as a central defender.

== Club career ==
Born in Medellín, de la Cuesta started playing football with local Atlético Nacional. In January 2004, after an unassuming spell in Austria and a brief return to his first club, he signed with Spain's Cádiz CF, where he would remain for the better part of the following six and a half seasons.

With the Andalusia side, de la Cuesta competed in all three major levels of Spanish football. He played 15 games in La Liga in the 2005–06 campaign, which ended in relegation; his best output consisted of 25 matches and one goal in 2007–08, with his team also dropping down a tier, now from the second division.

Released by Cádiz in the summer of 2010, de la Cuesta joined another club in the country, Albacete Balompié, having his season curtailed after suffering an anterior cruciate ligament injury to his left knee and again suffering team relegation from division two.

== International career ==
De la Cuesta represented Colombia at the 2003 FIFA World Youth Championship in the United Arab Emirates, partnering Pablo Pachón in central defense as the national team finished third.
