= Amadou Coulibaly =

Burkinabé footballer

Personal information
- Date of birth: 31 December 1984 (age 41)
- Place of birth: Bobo-Dioulasso, Burkina Faso
- Height: 1.81 m (5 ft 11 in)
- Position: Defender

Youth career
- 2001–2005: RC Bobo Dioulasso

Senior career*
Years	Team	Apps	(Gls)
2005–2007	Rennes B	29	(1)
2007–2008	Grenoble	1	(0)
2009	Zemplín Michalovce	12	(0)
2009–2010	Oostende	0	(0)
2012–2015	FC Échirolles	53	(3)
Total		95	(4)

International career
2001–2007	Burkina Faso	15	(2)
- * Club domestic league appearances and goals

Amadou Coulibaly (born 31 December 1984) is a Burkinabé former professional footballer who played as a right back.

== Club career ==
Coulibaly played youth football for RC Bobo Dioulasso, before moving to Stade Rennais F.C. and Grenoble Foot 38 in France. He also played for Zemplín Michalovce in Slovakia and KV Oostende in Belgium.

== International career ==
Coulibaly represented the Burkina Faso national team at the 2001 FIFA U-17 World Championship and 2003 FIFA World Youth Championship, where the team finished top of Group A, but lost to Canada in the round of 16.

He was a member of the Burkinabé 2004 African Nations Cup team, who finished bottom of their group in the first round of the competition, thus failing to secure qualification for the quarter-finals.
