= Almamy Doumbia =

Ivorian footballer

Personal information
- Full name: Almamy Doumbia
- Date of birth: 25 October 1983 (age 42)
- Place of birth: Daloa, Ivory Coast
- Height: 1.75 m (5 ft 9 in)
- Position: Left midfielder

Senior career*
Years	Team	Apps	(Gls)
2002–2004	Perugia	0	(0)
2003	→ Catania (loan)	0	(0)
2003	→ Sambenedettese (loan)	0	(0)
2004–2006	Melfi	49	(2)
2006–2007	Igea Barcellona	31	(2)
2007–2008	Melfi	11	(0)
2008	Martina	6	(0)
2008–2011	Andria	69	(4)
2009	→ Bari (co-ownership)	1	(0)
2012–2013	Bisceglie	3	(0)
2013–2014	AS Mangasport		
2014	ASD Ascoli Satriano		(2)
2014–2015	Vigor Trani	6	(0)
2015–2016	ASD Ascoli Satriano		

International career
2005–2006	Ivory Coast	1	(0)
- * Club domestic league appearances and goals

Almamy Doumbia (born 25 October 1983) is a retired Ivorian footballer who played as a left midfielder.

Doumbia was born in Daloa. He joined Bari in join-ownership bid in January 2009. He played the first and only match for Bari on 17 January against bottom team Treviso. In June 2009 he was bought back by Andria.
