= Soumaila Tassembedo =

Burkinabé football player (born 1983)

Soumaïla Tassembédo
Personal information
- Full name: Soumaïla Tassembédo
- Date of birth: 27 November 1983 (age 42)
- Place of birth: Peni-Houet, Upper Volta
- Height: 1.85 m (6 ft 1 in)
- Position: Defensive midfielder

Youth career
- 1997–1999: Etoile Filante Ouagadougou

Senior career*
| Years | Team | Apps | (Gls) |
| 2000–2004 | Etoile Filante Ouagadougou | 23 | (1) |
| 2004–2008 | FC Sheriff Tiraspol | 44 | (1) |
| 2009–2013 | Etoile Filante Ouagadougou | | |

International career
| 2002–2008 | Burkina Faso | 22 | (0) |
- * Club domestic league appearances and goals

Soumaïla Tassembédo (born 27 November 1983 in Peni-Houet) is a Burkinabé football midfielder who is currently playing for Etoile Filante Ouagadougou.

== Career ==
Tassembedo played for Etoile Filante Ouagadougou between 2004 joined than to Sheriff Tiraspol, here played between June 2008 than left Moldova after three and a half year. In January 2009 was on trial at Alemannia Aachen, but the transfer failed and he signed for Etoile Filante Ouagadougou.

== International career ==
Tassembedo was part of the Burkinabé 2002 African Nations Cup team, who finished bottom of group B in the first round of competition, thus failing to secure qualification for the quarter-finals. He also featured at the 2003 FIFA World Youth Championship.

== Personal life ==
Soumaila's younger brother Jean-Yves plays in Italy for Associazione Sportiva Virtus Malgrate Valmadrera.
