= Pablo Pachón =

Colombian footballer (born 1983)

Personal information
- Full name: Pablo César Pachón Henao
- Date of birth: 8 October 1983 (age 43)
- Place of birth: Bogotá, Colombia
- Height: 1.75 m (5 ft 9 in)
- Position: Defender

Senior career*
Years	Team	Apps	(Gls)
2000–2007	Santa Fe		
2008–2009	Patriotas		

International career
2003	Colombia U-20	7	(0)
2005–2006	Colombia	4	(0)
- * Club domestic league appearances and goals as of 05:30, 5 June 2018 (UTC)

Pablo César Pachón Henao (born 8 October 1983) is a Colombian retired football defender.

== Career ==
Pachón began his playing career with Independiente Santa Fe in 2001. He joined Patriotas F.C. in 2009.

Pachón partnered with José de la Cuesta in central defense at the Colombia national under-20 football team at the 2003 FIFA World Youth Championship in UAE, where Colombia finished fourth. Between 2005 and 2006 he made four appearances for the Colombia national team.
