= Landázuri =

- Municipality and town
- Location of the municipality and town of Landázuri in the Santander Department of Colombia
- Coordinates: 6°13′5″N 73°48′41″W
- Country: Colombia
- Department: Santander Department
- Founded: April 1, 1907
- Founder: Jose Maria Landazuri

Area
  - Total: 630 km^{2} (240 sq mi)

Population (Census 2018)
  - Total: 9,238
  - Density: 15/km^{2} (38/sq mi)
- Demonym: Landázureño
- Time zone: UTC-5 (Colombia Standard Time)
- Website: www.landazuri-santander.gov.co

Landázuri is a town and municipality in the Santander Department in northeastern Colombia.

== Climate ==
Climate data for Landázuri, elevation 1,085 m (3,560 ft), (1981–2010)
Month	Jan	Feb	Mar	Apr	May	Jun	Jul	Aug	Sep	Oct	Nov	Dec	Year
Mean daily maximum °C (°F)	26.8 (80.2)	27.0 (80.6)	26.8 (80.2)	26.8 (80.2)	26.9 (80.4)	26.9 (80.4)	27.0 (80.6)	27.1 (80.8)	26.7 (80.1)	26.4 (79.5)	26.1 (79.0)	26.4 (79.5)	26.7 (80.1)
Daily mean °C (°F)	22.8 (73.0)	22.8 (73.0)	22.8 (73.0)	22.9 (73.2)	23.0 (73.4)	23.0 (73.4)	23.0 (73.4)	23.1 (73.6)	22.8 (73.0)	22.5 (72.5)	22.5 (72.5)	22.6 (72.7)	22.8 (73.0)
Mean daily minimum °C (°F)	17.9 (64.2)	17.7 (63.9)	17.6 (63.7)	17.6 (63.7)	17.7 (63.9)	17.6 (63.7)	17.4 (63.3)	17.5 (63.5)	17.1 (62.8)	17.0 (62.6)	17.0 (62.6)	17.5 (63.5)	17.4 (63.3)
Average precipitation mm (inches)	112.8 (4.44)	163.7 (6.44)	207.9 (8.19)	297.6 (11.72)	352.2 (13.87)	316.3 (12.45)	255.9 (10.07)	250.1 (9.85)	304.1 (11.97)	341.0 (13.43)	288.7 (11.37)	182.9 (7.20)	3,056.3 (120.33)
Average precipitation days	13	15	18	22	25	23	23	23	23	24	21	17	246
Average relative humidity (%)	88	89	89	88	89	88	86	86	87	89	90	90	88
Source: Instituto de Hidrologia Meteorologia y Estudios Ambientales
