= Juan Carlos de la Barrera =

Mexican footballer (born 1983)

Personal information
- Full name: Juan Carlos de la Barrera Lara
- Date of birth: 17 March 1983 (age 43)
- Place of birth: Querétaro City, Mexico
- Height: 1.84 m (6 ft 0 in)
- Position: Defender

Team information
- Current team: Querétaro U-19 (Manager)

Youth career
- –2003: Querétaro

Senior career*
Years	Team	Apps	(Gls)
2003–2004	Irapuato	4	(0)
2004–2005	Puebla	38	(0)
2006	Pachuca	2	(1)
2006–2010	Indios	70	(6)
2010	San Luis	5	(0)
2011	Irapuato	10	(0)
2012–2013	Correcaminos	14	(1)
2014–2015	Puebla	4	(0)
2015–2017	Atlante	24	(0)
2017–2018	Tampico Madero	4	(0)

International career
2003	Mexico U20	3	(0)

Managerial career
- 2020–2021: Querétaro Reserves and Academy
- 2022–2024: Querétaro (Assistant)
- 2025–: Querétaro Reserves and Academy
- * Club domestic league appearances and goals

Juan Carlos de la Barrera Lara (born 17 March 1983) is a Mexican football coach and a former player.

== Club career ==
A native of Querétaro, Querétaro, De la Barrera is a product of Querétaro F.C.'s youth system. He has had a journeyman's career, making his Mexican Primera División debut with Irapuato FC in September 2003, followed by short stints at Puebla F.C. and C.F. Pachuca.

The central defender next spend four years with Indios de Ciudad Juárez, playing in the Primera División A where he was the vice-captain of the team. On May 15, 2010, he rejoined Puebla F.C.

In January 2011, shortly after joining San Luis F.C., De la Barrera was seriously injured in an auto accident in San José Iturbide, which ruled him out of the team for six months.

== International ==
De la Barerra Participated in the 2003 FIFA World Youth Championship, with Mexico.

== Personal ==
De la Barrera's father, also Juan Carlos, was also a professional footballer who played for Atletas Campesinos.
