= Mamadi Berthe =

French footballer (born 1983)

Personal information
- Full name: Mamadi Berthe
- Date of birth: 17 January 1983 (age 43)
- Place of birth: Nogent-sur-Marne, France
- Height: 1.80 m (5 ft 11 in)
- Position: Forward

Senior career*
Years	Team	Apps	(Gls)
1999–2003	AS Cannes	14	(1)
2003–2005	CS Sedan Ardennes	3	(1)
2004–2005	US Roye	8	(1)
2005–2006	UD Los Barrios		
2006–2007	Ethnikos Assia		
2008	Olympiakos Nicosia		
- * Club domestic league appearances and goals as of 16 January 2008

Mamadi Berthe (born 17 January 1983) is a French retired footballer.

== Career ==
Berthe was part of the Mali U-20 team who finish third in group stage of 2003 FIFA World Youth Championship.

He was part of the Malian 2004 Olympic football team, who exited in the quarter finals, finishing top of group A, but losing to Italy in the next round.
