= Flávio Kretzer =

Brazilian footballer (born 1979)

Personal information
- Full name: Flávio Roberto Kreter
- Date of birth: October 2, 1979 (age 47)
- Place of birth: Brazil
- Height: 1.96 m (6 ft 5 in)
- Position: Goalkeeper

Senior career*
Years	Team	Apps	(Gls)
-2003	Avaí FC		
2004–2006	São Paulo FC	4	(0)
2006	Sport Club do Recife		
2007	Santa Cruz Futebol Clube		
2007	Paulista Futebol Clube		
2008	Grêmio Esportivo Brasil		
2009	Esporte Clube Novo Hamburgo	13	(0)
2010	Uberlândia Esporte Clube	7	(0)
2011–2012	Clube Atlético Metropolitano	39	(0)
2013	Fortaleza Esporte Clube	6	(0)
2014	Tombense Futebol Clube	11	(0)
- * Club domestic league appearances and goals

Flávio Roberto Kretzer (born 2 October 1979 in Brazil) is a retired Brazilian footballer.

== Career ==
In 2005, Kretzer won the 2005 Club World Cup with Sao Paulo.

Throughout his career, he had to undergo five surgeries, including the removal of his left kidney at the age of 28.
