= Rio Sport d'Anyama =

Rio Sport
- Full name: Rio Sport d'Anyama
- Nickname(s): Compagnie Loloba
- Founded: May 1990
- Ground: Stade de Rio Sports
- Capacity: 3,000
- Chairman: Amidou Sylla
- Manager: Moussa Traoré
- League: Championnat de Côte d'Ivoire de football D3
- 2007: 5th Place
Home colours	Away colours

Rio Sport d'Anyama is an association football club based in the town of Anyama, Côte d'Ivoire.

== History ==
The club stadium is Stade de Rio Sports, seating 3,000 people.

The club's president is Amidou Sylla, credited with exercising a formative influence on Arouna Koné when Koné was at Rio Sport, before he went on to play professionally in Europe and represent Côte d'Ivoire internationally.
