= Cesar Fawcett =

Colombian footballer (born 1983)

César Fawcett
Personal information
- Full name: César Augusto Fawcett Lébolo
- Date of birth: August 12, 1983 (age 43)
- Place of birth: Barranquilla, Colombia

Senior career*
Years	Team	Apps	(Gls)
2002–2004	Atlético Junior	121	(2)
2005	→ Real Cartagena (loan)	12	(0)
2006	→ Santa Fe (loan)	17	(0)
2007	→ Deportivo Pereira (loan)	16	(0)

International career
2003	Colombia U-20		
- * Club domestic league appearances and goals as of 21:01, 21 March 2010 (UTC)

César Augusto Fawcett Lébolo (born August 12, 1983) is a Former Colombian football left defender’’’

== International career ==
He played with the Colombia national under-20 football team at the 2003 FIFA World Youth Championship in UAE, helping Colombia finish 3rd by defeating Argentina.
