= 2003 FIFA World Youth Championship =

FIFA World Youth Championship Emirates 2003 2003 الإمارات العربية المتحدة

Tournament details
- Host country: United Arab Emirates
- Dates: 27 November – 19 December
- Teams: 24 (from 6 confederations)
- Venues: 7 (in 4 host cities)

Final positions
- Champions: Brazil (4th title)
- Runners-up: Spain
- Third place: Colombia
- Fourth place: Argentina

Tournament statistics
- Matches played: 52
- Goals scored: 119 (2.29 per match)
- Attendance: 592,100 (11,387 per match)
- Top scorer(s): (Brazil) Dudu (Argentina) Fernando Cavenaghi (United States) Eddie Johnson (Japan) Daisuke Sakata (4 goals)
- Best player: (United Arab Emirates) Ismail Matar
- Fair play award: Colombia

The 2003 FIFA World Youth Championship was the 14th FIFA World Youth Championship. It took place in United Arab Emirates between 27 November and 19 December 2003. Brazil claimed their fourth title, becoming the first country to simultaneously hold all three World Cups of the same gender (senior, under-20, and under-17). (Note: Brazil had won the 2002 FIFA World Cup and 2003 FIFA U-17 World Championship.) The tournament was originally planned to be played 25 March to 16 April 2003, but was postponed because of the Iraq War.

== Venues ==
Abu Dhabi			Al Ain
Zayed Sports City Stadium	Mohammed bin Zayed Stadium	Al Nahyan Stadium	Sheikh Khalifa International Stadium
Capacity: 66,000	Capacity: 15,000	Capacity: 12,000	Capacity: 12,000
2003 FIFA World Youth Championship is located in United Arab Emirates
Dubai			Sharjah
Al-Maktoum Stadium		Al-Rashid Stadium	Sharjah Stadium
Capacity: 12,000		Capacity: 18,000	Capacity: 12,000

== Qualification ==
The following 24 teams qualified for the 2003 FIFA World Youth Championship.

Confederation	Qualifying Tournament	Qualifier(s)
AFC (Asia)	Host nation	United Arab Emirates
AFC (Asia)	2002 AFC Youth Championship	Japan; Saudi Arabia; South Korea; Uzbekistan^{1}
CAF (Africa)	2003 African Youth Championship	Burkina Faso^{1} Ivory Coast; Egypt; Mali
CONCACAF (North, Central America & Caribbean)	2003 CONCACAF U-20 Tournament	Canada; Mexico; Panama^{1} United States
CONMEBOL (South America)	2003 South American Youth Championship	Argentina; Brazil; Colombia; Paraguay
OFC (Oceania)	2002 OFC U-20 Championship	Australia
UEFA (Europe)	2002 UEFA European Under-19 Football Championship	Czech Republic; England; Germany; Republic of Ireland; Slovakia^{1} Spain

1.Teams that made their debut.

== Match officials ==
Confederation	Referee
AFC	Matthew Breeze (Australia)
AFC	Rahman Al-Delawar (Bahrain)
AFC	Shamsul Maidin (Singapore)
AFC	Kwon Jong-chul (South Korea)
CAF	Mohamed Benouza (Algeria)
CAF	Abdou Diouf (Senegal)
CONCACAF	Benito Archundia (Mexico)
CONCACAF	Kevin Stott (United States)
CONMEBOL	Horacio Elizondo (Argentina)
CONMEBOL	Wilson de Souza (Brazil)
CONMEBOL	Óscar Ruiz (Colombia)
UEFA	Frank De Bleeckere (Belgium)
UEFA	Roberto Rosetti (Italy)
UEFA	Eduardo Iturralde González (Spain)
UEFA	Massimo Busacca (Switzerland)

== Squads ==
For a list of all squads that played in the final tournament, see 2003 FIFA World Youth Championship squads.

== Group stage ==
The 24 teams were split into six groups of four teams. Six group winners, six second-place finishers and the four best third-place finishers qualify for the knockout round.

=== Group A ===
Pos	Team	Pld	W	D	L	GF	GA	GD	Pts	Group stage result
1	Burkina Faso	3	2	1	0	2	0	+2	7	Advance to knockout stage
2	Slovakia	3	2	0	1	5	2	+3	6	Advance to knockout stage
3	United Arab Emirates (H)	3	1	1	1	3	5	−2	4	Advance to knockout stage
4	Panama	3	0	0	3	1	4	−3	0	

Source: FIFA
(H) Hosts
27 November 2003
20:30

United Arab Emirates	1–4	Slovakia
Al-Wehaibi 72'	(Report)	Brezinský 5'; Halenár 23'; Čech 48'; Hološko 81'

Zayed Sports City Stadium, Abu Dhabi
Attendance: 46,000
Referee: Horacio Elizondo (Argentina)

28 November 2003
20:30

Panama	0–1	Burkina Faso
	(Report)	Bance 81'

Mohammed bin Zayed Stadium, Abu Dhabi
Attendance: 4,500
Referee: Roberto Rosetti (Italy)

1 December 2003
17:45

Burkina Faso	1–0	Slovakia
Zongo 6'	(Report)

Mohammed bin Zayed Stadium, Abu Dhabi
Attendance: 3,500
Referee: Rahman Al-Delawar (Bahrain)

1 December 2003
20:30

Panama	1–2	United Arab Emirates
Gun 36'	(Report)	Shehab 18' (pen.); Saleh 80'

Mohammed bin Zayed Stadium, Abu Dhabi
Attendance: 15,000
Referee: Frank De Bleeckere (Belgium)

4 December 2003
17:45

United Arab Emirates	0–0	Burkina Faso
	(Report)

Mohammed bin Zayed Stadium, Abu Dhabi
Attendance: 13,000
Referee: Óscar Ruiz (Colombia)

4 December 2003
20:30

Slovakia	1–0	Panama
Pečovský 49'	(Report)

Mohammed bin Zayed Stadium, Abu Dhabi
Attendance: 4,000
Referee: Mohamed Benouza (Algeria)

=== Group B ===
Pos	Team	Pld	W	D	L	GF	GA	GD	Pts	Group stage result
1	Argentina	3	3	0	0	7	3	+4	9	Advance to knockout stage
2	Spain	3	2	0	1	4	2	+2	6	Advance to knockout stage
3	Mali	3	1	0	2	4	7	−3	3	
4	Uzbekistan	3	0	0	3	3	6	−3	0	

Source: FIFA
28 November 2003
17:45

Argentina	2–1	Spain
Fernández 50', 74'	(Report)	Gabi 25'

Sharjah Stadium, Sharjah
Attendance: 15,000
Referee: Benito Archundia (Mexico)

28 November 2003
20:30

Uzbekistan	2–3	Mali
Inomov 18'; Geynrikh 63'	(Report)	Diarra 4'; Berthe 51'; Coulibaly 90+1'

Sharjah Stadium, Sharjah
Attendance: 3,000
Referee: Wilson de Souza (Brazil)

1 December 2003
17:45

Mali	0–2	Spain
	(Report)	Juanfran 16'; S. García 77' (pen.)

Sharjah Stadium, Sharjah
Attendance: 6,500
Referee: Óscar Ruiz (Colombia)

1 December 2003
20:30

Uzbekistan	1–2	Argentina
Geynrikh 4'	(Report)	Fernández 70'; Cavenaghi 90+3' (pen.)

Sharjah Stadium, Sharjah
Attendance: 8,500
Referee: Abdou Diouf (Senegal)

4 December 2003
17:45

Argentina	3–1	Mali
Ferreyra 13'; Herrera 26'; Diakité 32' (o.g.)	(Report)	Berthe 48' (pen.)

Sharjah Stadium, Sharjah
Attendance: 5,000
Referee: Frank De Bleeckere (Belgium)

4 December 2003
20:30

Spain	1–0	Uzbekistan
Iniesta 15'	(Report)

Sharjah Stadium, Sharjah
Attendance: 4,000
Referee: Massimo Busacca (Switzerland)

=== Group C ===
Pos	Team	Pld	W	D	L	GF	GA	GD	Pts	Group stage result
1	Australia	3	2	1	0	6	4	+2	7	Advance to knockout stage
2	Brazil	3	1	1	1	5	4	+1	4	Advance to knockout stage
3	Canada	3	1	0	2	2	4	−2	3	Advance to knockout stage
4	Czech Republic	3	0	2	1	2	3	−1	2	

Source: FIFA
28 November 2003
17:45

Brazil	2–0	Canada
D. Carvalho 56'; Nilmar 84'	(Report)

Al-Rashid Stadium, Dubai
Attendance: 13,150
Referee: Eduardo Iturralde González (Spain)

28 November 2003
20:30

Czech Republic	1–1	Australia
Limberský 24'	(Report)	McDonald 49'

Al-Rashid Stadium, Dubai
Attendance: 8,200
Referee: Abdou Diouf (Senegal)

1 December 2003
17:45

Australia	2–1	Canada
Brosque 12'; McKay 54'	(Report)	Hume 33'

Al-Rashid Stadium, Dubai
Attendance: 8,200
Referee: Kwon Jong-Chul (South Korea)

1 December 2003
20:30

Czech Republic	1–1	Brazil
Limberský 34'	(Report)	Adaílton 37'

Al-Rashid Stadium, Dubai
Attendance: 12,500
Referee: Benito Archundia (Mexico)

4 December 2003
17:45

Brazil	2–3	Australia
Juninho 75'; Dudu 87'	(Report)	Danze 31', 37'; Dilevski 47'

Al-Rashid Stadium, Dubai
Attendance: 10,000
Referee: Roberto Rosetti (Italy)

4 December 2003
20:30

Canada	1–0	Czech Republic
Hume 80'	(Report)

Al-Rashid Stadium, Dubai
Attendance: 4,000
Referee: Horacio Elizondo (Argentina)

=== Group D ===
Pos	Team	Pld	W	D	L	GF	GA	GD	Pts	Group stage result
1	Japan	3	2	0	1	3	4	−1	6	Advance to knockout stage
2	Colombia	3	1	2	0	4	1	+3	5	Advance to knockout stage
3	Egypt	3	1	1	1	1	1	0	4	Advance to knockout stage
4	England	3	0	1	2	0	2	−2	1	

Source: FIFA
29 November 2003
17:45

Colombia	0–0	Egypt
	(Report)

Al-Maktoum Stadium, Dubai
Attendance: 11,000
Referee: Massimo Busacca (Switzerland)

29 November 2003
20:30

Japan	1–0	England
Sakata 54'	(Report)

Al-Maktoum Stadium, Dubai
Attendance: 12,000
Referee: Kevin Stott (United States)

2 December 2003
17:45

England	0–1	Egypt
	(Report)	Moteab 74'

Al-Maktoum Stadium, Dubai
Attendance: 12,000
Referee: Shamsul Maidin (Singapore)

2 December 2003
20:30

Japan	1–4	Colombia
Sakata 75'	(Report)	De la Cuesta 35'; Castrillón 43'; Aguilar 65'; Rivas 90+3'

Al-Maktoum Stadium, Dubai
Attendance: 7,200
Referee: Matthew Breeze (Australia)

5 December 2003
17:45

Colombia	0–0	England
	(Report)

Al-Maktoum Stadium, Dubai
Attendance: 9,210
Referee: Rahman Al-Delawar (Bahrain)

5 December 2003
20:30

Egypt	0–1	Japan
	(Report)	Hirayama 79'

Al-Maktoum Stadium, Dubai
Attendance: 11,800
Referee: Benito Archundia (Mexico)

=== Group E ===
Pos	Team	Pld	W	D	L	GF	GA	GD	Pts	Group stage result
1	Republic of Ireland	3	2	1	0	6	3	+3	7	Advance to knockout stage
2	Ivory Coast	3	1	2	0	4	3	+1	5	Advance to knockout stage
3	Saudi Arabia	3	0	2	1	2	3	−1	2	
4	Mexico	3	0	1	2	2	5	−3	1	

Source: FIFA
29 November 2003
17:45

Saudi Arabia	1–2	Republic of Ireland
Al-Mehyani 49'	(Report)	Elliott 18', 77'

Sheikh Khalifa International Stadium, Al Ain
Attendance: 9,055
Referee: Matthew Breeze (Australia)

29 November 2003
20:30

Mexico	1–2	Ivory Coast
De Nigris 85'	(Report)	Tohoua 19'; Koné 58'

Sheikh Khalifa International Stadium, Al Ain
Attendance: 6,350
Referee: Kwon Jong-Chul (South Korea)

2 December 2003
17:45

Ivory Coast	2–2	Republic of Ireland
Koné 12', 67'	(Report)	Paisley 36'; Elliott 74'

Sheikh Khalifa International Stadium, Al Ain
Attendance: 10,265
Referee: Massimo Busacca (Switzerland)

2 December 2003
20:30

Mexico	1–1	Saudi Arabia
Pinto 30'	(Report)	Majrashi 15'

Sheikh Khalifa International Stadium, Al Ain
Attendance: 10,950
Referee: Kevin Stott (United States)

5 December 2003
17:45

Saudi Arabia	0–0	Ivory Coast
	(Report)

Sheikh Khalifa International Stadium, Al Ain
Attendance: 10,370
Referee: Kwon Jong-Chul (South Korea)

5 December 2003
20:30

Republic of Ireland	2–0	Mexico
Paisley 35'; Kelly 85'	(Report)

Sheikh Khalifa International Stadium, Al Ain
Attendance: 9,230
Referee: Wilson de Souza (Brazil)

=== Group F ===
Pos	Team	Pld	W	D	L	GF	GA	GD	Pts	Group stage result
1	United States	3	2	0	1	6	4	+2	6	Advance to knockout stage
2	Paraguay	3	2	0	1	4	3	+1	6	Advance to knockout stage
3	South Korea	3	1	0	2	2	3	−1	3	Advance to knockout stage
4	Germany	3	1	0	2	3	5	−2	3	

Source: FIFA
29 November 2003
17:45

Paraguay	1–3	United States
Dos Santos 6'	(Report)	Johnson 53'; Magee 68'; Convey 81'

Al-Nahyan Stadium, Abu Dhabi
Attendance: 3,500
Referee: Shamsul Maidin (Singapore)

29 November 2003
20:30

South Korea	2–0	Germany
Lee H.J. 51'; Lee J.M. 70'	(Report)

Al-Nahyan Stadium, Abu Dhabi
Attendance: 8,000
Referee: Mohamed Benouza (Algeria)

2 December 2003
17:45

Germany	3–1	United States
Huth 47'; Trochowski 60'; Kneissl 63'	(Report)	Whitbread 77'

Al-Nahyan Stadium, Abu Dhabi
Attendance: 6,000
Referee: Wilson de Souza (Brazil)

2 December 2003
20:30

South Korea	0–1	Paraguay
	(Report)	Velázquez 14'

Al-Nahyan Stadium, Abu Dhabi
Attendance: 5,000
Referee: Roberto Rosetti (Italy)

5 December 2003
17:45

Paraguay	2–0	Germany
López 39'; Valdez 57'	(Report)

Al-Nahyan Stadium, Abu Dhabi
Attendance: 6,000
Referee: Eduardo Iturralde González (Spain)

5 December 2003
20:30

United States	2–0	South Korea
Johnson 13' (pen.), 24' (pen.)	(Report)

Al-Nahyan Stadium, Abu Dhabi
Attendance: 8,000
Referee: Matthew Breeze (Australia)

=== Ranking of third-placed teams ===
Pos	Grp	Team	Pld	W	D	L	GF	GA	GD	Pts	Result
1	D	Egypt	3	1	1	1	1	1	0	4	Advance to knockout stage
2	A	United Arab Emirates (H)	3	1	1	1	3	5	−2	4	Advance to knockout stage
3	F	South Korea	3	1	0	2	2	3	−1	3	Advance to knockout stage
4	C	Canada	3	1	0	2	2	4	−2	3	Advance to knockout stage
5	B	Mali	3	1	0	2	4	7	−3	3	
6	E	Saudi Arabia	3	0	2	1	2	3	−1	2	

(H) Hosts

== Knockout stages ==
=== Bracket ===
Round of 16
8 December – Abu Dhabi (Al-Nahyan)
Burkina Faso	0
Canada	1
9 December – Al Ain
Paraguay	0
Spain	1
9 December – Al Ain
Republic of Ireland	2
Colombia (g.g.)	3
9 December – Sharjah
Australia	0
United Arab Emirates	1
8 December – Abu Dhabi (Al-Nahyan)
Japan (g.g.)	2
South Korea	1
9 December – Sharjah
Brazil (g.g.)	2
Slovakia	1
8 December – Dubai (Al-Maktoum)
United States	2
Ivory Coast	0
8 December – Dubai (Al-Maktoum)
Argentina (g.g.)	2
Egypt	1

Quarter-finals
12 December – Abu Dhabi (MbZ)
Canada	1
Spain (g.g.)	2
12 December – Dubai (Al-Rashid)
Colombia	1
United Arab Emirates	0
12 December – Dubai (Al-Rashid)
Japan	1
Brazil	5
12 December – Abu Dhabi (MbZ)
United States	1
Argentina (g.g.)	2

Semi-finals
15 December – Dubai (Al-Rashid)
Spain	1
Colombia	0
15 December – Abu Dhabi (MbZ)
Brazil	1
Argentina	0

Final
19 December – Abu Dhabi (Sports City)
Spain	0
Brazil	1
Third place play-off
19 December – Abu Dhabi (Sports City)
Colombia	2
Argentina	1

=== Round of 16 ===
8 December 2003
18:00

Japan	2–1 (a.e.t.)	South Korea
Sakata 82', 105'	(Report)	Choi S.K. 38'

Al-Nahyan Stadium, Abu Dhabi
Attendance: 5,500
Referee: Horacio Elizondo (Argentina)

8 December 2003
18:00

Argentina	2–1 (a.e.t.)	Egypt
Cavenaghi 27', 114'	(Report)	Metwaly 42'

Al-Maktoum Stadium, Dubai
Attendance: 10,800
Referee: Massimo Busacca (Switzerland)

8 December 2003
21:00

Burkina Faso	0–1	Canada
	(Report)	Simpson 59'

Al-Nahyan Stadium, Abu Dhabi
Attendance: 5,000
Referee: Kwon Jong-chul (South Korea)

8 December 2003
21:00

United States	2–0	Ivory Coast
Mapp 7'; Johnson 43' (pen.)	(Report)

Al-Maktoum Stadium, Dubai
Attendance: 3,210
Referee: Óscar Ruiz (Colombia)

9 December 2003
18:00

Brazil	2–1 (a.e.t.)	Slovakia
Dudu 83', 100'	(Report)	Sebo 61'

Sharjah Stadium, Sharjah
Attendance: 12,800
Referee: Eduardo Iturralde González (Spain)

9 December 2003
18:00

Paraguay	0–1	Spain
	(Report)	S. García 66'

Sheikh Khalifa International Stadium, Al Ain
Attendance: 9,250
Referee: Benito Archundia (Mexico)

9 December 2003
21:00

Australia	0–1	United Arab Emirates
	(Report)	Matar 89'

Sharjah Stadium, Sharjah
Attendance: 13,500
Referee: Wilson de Souza (Brazil)

9 December 2003
21:00

Republic of Ireland	2–3 (a.e.t.)	Colombia
Doyle 85'; McCarthy 90+2'	(Report)	Perea 11'; Montaño 70'; Carrillo 104'

Sheikh Khalifa International Stadium, Al Ain
Attendance: 6,860
Referee: Frank De Bleeckere (Belgium)

=== Quarter-finals ===
12 December 2003
18:00

Canada	1–2 (a.e.t.)	Spain
Hume 53'	(Report)	Iniesta 35'; Arizmendi 97'

Mohammed bin Zayed Stadium, Abu Dhabi
Attendance: 15,000
Referee: Wilson de Souza (Brazil)

12 December 2003
18:00

Colombia	1–0	United Arab Emirates
Montaño 14'	(Report)

Al-Rashid Stadium, Dubai
Attendance: 13,000
Referee: Horacio Elizondo (Argentina)

12 December 2003
21:00

United States	1–2 (a.e.t.)	Argentina
Convey 59'	(Report)	Mascherano 90+4'; Cavenaghi 104' (pen.)

Mohammed bin Zayed Stadium, Abu Dhabi
Attendance: 15,500
Referee: Eduardo Iturralde González (Spain)

12 December 2003
21:00

Japan	1–5	Brazil
Hirayama 89'	(Report)	D. Carvalho 2', 13'; Kléber 15'; Nilmar 34', 90+1'

Al-Rashid Stadium, Dubai
Attendance: 10,000
Referee: Óscar Ruiz (Colombia)

=== Semi-finals ===
15 December 2003
18:00

Brazil	1–0	Argentina
Dudu 65'	(Report)

Mohammed bin Zayed Stadium, Abu Dhabi
Attendance: 16,000
Referee: Benito Archundia (Mexico)

15 December 2003
21:00

Spain	1–0	Colombia
Iniesta 86' (pen.)	(Report)

Al-Rashid Stadium, Dubai
Attendance: 5,700
Referee: Frank De Bleeckere (Belgium)

=== Third place play-off ===
19 December 2003
18:00

Colombia	2–1	Argentina
Carrillo 16'; Castrillón 62'	(Report)	Ferreyra 45+1'

Zayed Sports City Stadium, Abu Dhabi
Attendance: 55,000
Referee: Matthew Breeze (Australia)

=== Final ===
19 December 2003
20:45

Spain	0–1	Brazil
	(Report)	Fernandinho 87'

Zayed Sports City Stadium, Abu Dhabi
Attendance: 55,000
Referee: Roberto Rosetti (Italy)

Spain	Brazil

== Result ==
2003 FIFA World Youth champions

Brazil
Fourth title

2nd Place	3rd Place	4th Place
Spain	Colombia	Argentina

== Awards ==
Golden Shoe	Golden Ball	FIFA Fair Play Award
(United States) Eddie Johnson	(United Arab Emirates) Ismail Matar	Colombia

== Goalscorers ==
4 goals

- (Brazil) Dudu
- (Argentina) Fernando Cavenaghi
- (Japan) Daisuke Sakata
- (United States) Eddie Johnson

3 goals

- (Ivory Coast) Arouna Koné
- (Spain) Andrés Iniesta
- (Brazil) Daniel Carvalho
- (Republic of Ireland) Stephen Elliott
- (Argentina) Leandro Fernández
- (Canada) Iain Hume
- (Brazil) Nilmar

2 goals

- (Argentina) Osmar Ferreyra
- (Australia) Anthony Danze
- (Colombia) Erwin Carrillo
- (Colombia) Jaime Castrillón
- (Colombia) Victor Montano
- (Czech Republic) David Limberský
- (Republic of Ireland) Stephen Paisley
- (Japan) Sota Hirayama
- (Mali) Mamadi Berthe
- (Spain) Sergio García
- (United States) Bobby Convey
- (Uzbekistan) Alexander Geynrikh

1 goal

- 57 players with one goal.

== Final ranking ==
Pos	Team	Pld	W	D	L	GF	GA	GD	Pts	Final result
1	Brazil	7	5	1	1	14	6	+8	16	Champions
2	Spain	7	5	0	2	8	4	+4	15	Runners-up
3	Colombia	7	4	2	1	10	5	+5	14	Third place
4	Argentina	7	5	0	2	12	8	+4	15	Fourth place
5	United States	5	3	0	2	9	6	+3	9	Eliminated in Quarter-finals
6	Japan	5	3	0	2	6	10	−4	9	Eliminated in Quarter-finals
7	United Arab Emirates (H)	5	2	1	2	4	6	−2	7	Eliminated in Quarter-finals
8	Canada	5	2	0	3	4	6	−2	6	Eliminated in Quarter-finals
9	Republic of Ireland	4	2	1	1	8	6	+2	7	Eliminated in Round of 16
10	Australia	4	2	1	1	6	5	+1	7	Eliminated in Round of 16
11	Burkina Faso	4	2	1	1	2	1	+1	7	Eliminated in Round of 16
12	Slovakia	4	2	0	2	6	4	+2	6	Eliminated in Round of 16
13	Paraguay	4	2	0	2	4	4	0	6	Eliminated in Round of 16
14	Ivory Coast	4	1	2	1	4	5	−1	5	Eliminated in Round of 16
15	Egypt	4	1	1	2	2	3	−1	4	Eliminated in Round of 16
16	South Korea	4	1	0	3	3	5	−2	3	Eliminated in Round of 16
17	Germany	3	1	0	2	3	5	−2	3	Eliminated in Group stage
18	Mali	3	1	0	2	4	7	−3	3	Eliminated in Group stage
19	Saudi Arabia	3	0	2	1	2	3	−1	2	Eliminated in Group stage
19	Czech Republic	3	0	2	1	2	3	−1	2	Eliminated in Group stage
21	England	3	0	1	2	0	2	−2	1	Eliminated in Group stage
22	Mexico	3	0	1	2	2	5	−3	1	Eliminated in Group stage
23	Uzbekistan	3	0	0	3	3	6	−3	0	Eliminated in Group stage
24	Panama	3	0	0	3	1	4	−3	0	Eliminated in Group stage

Source: rsssf.com
(H) Hosts
