= 2003 South American U-20 Championship squads =

Below are the rosters for the 2003 South American Youth Championship tournament held in Uruguay. The ten national teams involved in the tournament were required to register a squad of 20 players. Only players in these squads were eligible to take part in the tournament.

Players' names marked in bold have been capped at full international level.

== Argentina ==
Coach: Hugo Tocalli (Argentina)

| No. | Pos. | Player | Date of birth (age) | Caps | Club |
|---|---|---|---|---|---|
| 1 | GK | Gustavo Eberto | 30 August 1983 (aged 19) | | (Argentina) Boca Juniors |
| 2 | DF | **Gonzalo Rodríguez** | 10 April 1984 (aged 18) | | (Argentina) San Lorenzo |
| 3 | DF | Marcos Charras | 9 January 1983 (aged 19) | | (Bulgaria) CSKA Sofia |
| 4 | DF | Mauricio Romero | 13 January 1983 (aged 19) | | (Argentina) Lanús |
| 5 | MF | **Javier Mascherano** | 8 June 1984 (aged 18) | | (Argentina) River Plate |
| 6 | DF | **Javier Pinola** | 24 February 1983 (aged 19) | | (Spain) Atlético Madrid |
| 7 | FW | Maxi López | 3 April 1984 (aged 18) | | (Argentina) River Plate |
| 8 | MF | **Pablo Zabaleta** | 16 January 1985 (aged 17) | | (Argentina) San Lorenzo |
| 9 | FW | **Fernando Cavenaghi** | 21 September 1983 (aged 19) | | (Argentina) River Plate |
| 10 | FW | **Carlos Tevez** | 5 February 1984 (aged 18) | | (Argentina) Boca Juniors |
| 11 | MF | Marcelo Carrusca | 1 September 1983 (aged 19) | | (Argentina) Estudiantes |
| 12 | GK | Lucas Molina | 30 March 1984 (aged 18) | | (Argentina) Independiente |
| 13 | DF | Walter García | 14 March 1984 (aged 18) | | (Argentina) San Lorenzo |
| 14 | DF | Joel Barbosa | 15 January 1983 (aged 19) | | (Argentina) Boca Juniors |
| 15 | MF | **Fernando Belluschi** | 10 September 1983 (aged 19) | | (Argentina) Newell's Old Boys |
| 16 | MF | Patricio Pérez | 27 June 1985 (aged 17) | | (Argentina) Vélez Sársfield |
| 17 | MF | Emanuel Rivas | 17 March 1983 (aged 19) | | (Argentina) Independiente |
| 18 | FW | Leonardo Pisculichi | 18 January 1984 (aged 18) | | (Argentina) Argentinos Juniors |
| 19 | MF | Hugo Colace | 6 January 1984 (aged 18) | | (Argentina) Argentinos Juniors |
| 20 | MF | **Jonás Gutiérrez** | 5 July 1983 (aged 19) | | (Argentina) Vélez Sársfield |

== Brazil ==
Coach: Marcos Paqueta (Brazil)

| No. | Pos. | Player | Date of birth (age) | Caps | Club |
|---|---|---|---|---|---|
| 1 | GK | **Jefferson** | 2 January 1983 (aged 20) | | (Brazil) Botafogo |
| 2 | DF | **Dani Alves** | 6 May 1983 (aged 19) | | (Spain) Sevilla |
| 3 | DF | Alcides Eduardo | 13 March 1985 (aged 17) | | (Brazil) Vitória |
| 4 | DF | André Bahia | 24 November 1983 (aged 19) | | (Brazil) Flamengo |
| 5 | MF | **Dudu Cearense** | 15 April 1983 (aged 19) | | (Brazil) Vitória |
| 6 | DF | Jean Carlos | 12 August 1983 (aged 19) | | (Brazil) Atlético-PR |
| 7 | FW | **Daniel Carvalho** | 1 March 1983 (aged 19) | | (Brazil) Internacional |
| 8 | MF | **Felipe Melo** | 26 June 1983 (aged 19) | | (Brazil) Flamengo |
| 9 | FW | Élton Giovanni | 3 September 1983 (aged 19) | | (Brazil) Grêmio |
| 10 | MF | Carlos Alberto | 11 December 1984 (aged 18) | | (Brazil) Fluminense |
| 11 | FW | Dagoberto | 22 March 1983 (aged 19) | | (Brazil) Atlético-PR |
| 12 | GK | **Fernando Henrique** | 25 November 1983 (aged 19) | | (Brazil) Fluminense |
| 13 | DF | Jancarlos | 15 August 1983 (aged 19) | | (Brazil) Fluminense |
| 14 | DF | **Gláuber** | 5 August 1983 (aged 19) | | (Brazil) Palmeiras |
| 15 | DF | Michael Anderson | 5 March 1983 (aged 19) | | (Brazil) Flamengo |
| 16 | MF | Wendel | 25 May 1984 (aged 18) | | (Brazil) Corinthians |
| 17 | MF | Juninho | 11 January 1983 (aged 19) | | (Brazil) Atlético Mineiro |
| 18 | MF | Cleiton Xavier | 23 March 1983 (aged 19) | | (Brazil) Internacional |
| 19 | FW | Jussiê | 19 September 1983 (aged 19) | | (Brazil) Cruzeiro |
| 20 | FW | William | 14 May 1983 (aged 19) | | (Brazil) Santos |

== Chile ==
Coach: Cesar Vaccia (Chile)

| No. | Pos. | Player | Date of birth (age) | Caps | Goals | Club |
|---|---|---|---|---|---|---|
| 1 | GK | **Miguel Pinto** | July 4, 1983 (aged 19) | | | (Football Federation of Chile) Universidad de Chile |
| 2 | DF | Enzo Vera | April 7, 1983 (aged 19) | | | (Football Federation of Chile) Colo-Colo |
| 3 | DF | Juan Toro | May 17, 1984 (aged 18) | | | (Football Federation of Chile) Magallanes |
| 4 | MF | **Gonzalo Fierro** | March 21, 1983 (aged 19) | | | (Football Federation of Chile) Colo-Colo |
| 5 | DF | **Miguel Aceval** | January 8, 1983 (aged 19) | | | (Football Federation of Chile) Colo-Colo |
| 6 | DF | Fernando Fica | April 21, 1983 (aged 19) | | | (Football Federation of Chile) Colo-Colo |
| 7 | MF | **Christian Martínez** | June 18, 1983 (aged 19) | | | (Football Federation of Chile) Universidad de Chile |
| 8 | MF | **Marco Estrada** | May 28, 1983 (aged 19) | | | (Football Federation of Chile) Everton |
| 9 | FW | Marcos Ávila | February 6, 1983 (aged 19) | | | (Football Federation of Chile) Colo-Colo |
| 10 | MF | Cristián Muñoz | May 23, 1983 (aged 19) | | | (Football Federation of Chile) Universidad de Chile |
| 11 | FW | **Eduardo Rubio** | November 7, 1983 (aged 19) | | | (Football Federation of Chile) Universidad Católica |
| 12 | GK | **Claudio Bravo** | April 13, 1983 (aged 19) | | | (Football Federation of Chile) Colo-Colo |
| 13 | DF | **José Manuel Rojas** | June 23, 1983 (aged 19) | | | (Football Federation of Chile) Universidad de Chile |
| 14 | MF | **Luis Pedro Figueroa** | May 14, 1983 (aged 19) | | | (Football Federation of Chile) Universidad de Concepción |
| 15 | MF | **Albert Acevedo** | May 6, 1983 (aged 19) | | | (Football Federation of Chile) Universidad Católica |
| 16 | FW | **Luis Jiménez** | June 17, 1984 (aged 18) | | | (Italian Football Federation) Ternana |
| 17 | MF | Luis Jara | January 12, 1983 (aged 19) | | | (Football Federation of Chile) Universidad Católica |
| 18 | MF | **Jorge Valdivia** | October 19, 1983 (aged 19) | | | (Football Federation of Chile) Colo-Colo |
| 19 | FW | **Mauricio Pinilla** | February 4, 1984 (aged 18) | | | (Football Federation of Chile) Universidad de Chile |
| 20 | MF | **Mark González** | July 10, 1984 (aged 18) | | | (Football Federation of Chile) Universidad Católica |

(Source for player names:)

== Ecuador ==
Coach: Fabián Burbano (Ecuador)

| No. | Pos. | Player | Date of birth (age) | Caps | Goals | Club |
|---|---|---|---|---|---|---|
| 1 | GK | Julio Eche | August 12, 1983 (aged 19) | | | (Ecuadorian Football Federation) Delfín |
| 2 | DF | Pedro Esterilla | October 28, 1984 (aged 18) | | | (Ecuadorian Football Federation) ESPOLI |
| 3 | DF | **Luis Checa** | December 21, 1983 (aged 19) | | | (Ecuadorian Football Federation) El Nacional |
| 4 | DF | **Jayro Campos** | July 18, 1984 (aged 18) | | | (Royal Belgian Football Association) Gent |
| 5 | MF | **Leonardo Soledispa** | January 15, 1983 (aged 19) | | | (Ecuadorian Football Federation) Barcelona |
| 6 | DF | Juan Guerrón | October 21, 1983 (aged 19) | | | (Ecuadorian Football Federation) ESPOLI |
| 7 | FW | **Roberto Miña** | November 7, 1984 (aged 18) | | | (Argentine Football Association) Huracán |
| 8 | MF | **Oswaldo Minda** | July 26, 1983 (aged 19) | | | (Ecuadorian Football Federation) Aucas |
| 9 | FW | **Félix Borja** | April 2, 1983 (aged 19) | | | (Ecuadorian Football Federation) El Nacional |
| 10 | MF | **Luis Saritama** | October 20, 1983 (aged 19) | | | (Ecuadorian Football Federation) Deportivo Quito |
| 11 | FW | **Joffre Guerrón** | April 28, 1985 (aged 17) | | | (Ecuadorian Football Federation) Aucas |
| 12 | GK | Carlos Camacho | September 14, 1983 (aged 19) | | | (Ecuadorian Football Federation) Deportivo Quevedo |
| 13 | DF | Luis Velasco | January 6, 1983 (aged 19) | | | (Ecuadorian Football Federation) LDU Quito |
| 14 | MF | **Luis Bolaños** | March 27, 1985 (aged 17) | | | (Ecuadorian Football Federation) LDU Quito |
| 15 | MF | Tyron Macías | July 9, 1984 (aged 18) | | | (Ecuadorian Football Federation) LDU Quito |
| 16 | DF | Ángel Anaguano | February 14, 1983 (aged 19) | | | (Ecuadorian Football Federation) Deportivo Quito |
| 17 | MF | Javier Caicedo | August 29, 1984 (aged 18) | | | (Ecuadorian Football Federation) El Nacional |
| 18 | MF | José Aguirre | January 5, 1983 (aged 19) | | | (Ecuadorian Football Federation) Emelec |
| 19 | FW | César Barre | March 13, 1983 (aged 19) | | | (Ecuadorian Football Federation) Delfín |
| 20 | DF | Iván Suárez | May 15, 1983 (aged 19) | | | (Ecuadorian Football Federation) Panamá |

(Source for player names:)

== Paraguay ==
Coach: Aníbal Ruiz (Uruguay)

| No. | Pos. | Player | Date of birth (age) | Caps | Club |
|---|---|---|---|---|---|
| 1 | GK | **Antony Silva** | 27 February 1984 (aged 18) | | (Paraguay) Club Libertad |
| 2 | DF | Óscar Díaz | 29 January 1984 (aged 18) | | (Paraguay) 12 de Octubre |
| 3 | DF | **Víctor Hugo Mareco** | 26 February 1984 (aged 18) | | (Italy) Brescia |
| 4 | DF | **Enrique Meza** | 28 November 1985 (aged 17) | | (Paraguay) Sol de América |
| 5 | DF | Ángel Martínez | 9 October 1983 (aged 19) | | (Paraguay) Olimpia Asunción |
| 6 | DF | Juan Miguel Díaz | 14 August 1983 (aged 19) | | (Paraguay) Cerro Porteño |
| 7 | FW | **Erwin Avalos** | 27 April 1983 (aged 19) | | (Paraguay) Cerro Porteño |
| 8 | MF | **Édgar Barreto** | 15 July 1984 (aged 18) | | (Paraguay) Cerro Porteño |
| 9 | MF | Blas López | 14 March 1984 (aged 18) | | (Paraguay) Club Libertad |
| 10 | MF | **Julio dos Santos** | 7 May 1983 (aged 19) | | (Paraguay) Cerro Porteño |
| 11 | DF | **Ernesto Cristaldo** | 16 March 1984 (aged 18) | | (Paraguay) Cerro Porteño |
| 12 | GK | Marco Almeda | 23 March 1984 (aged 18) | | (Paraguay) Cerro Porteño |
| 13 | MF | Jorge Cáceres | 16 June 1983 (aged 19) | | (Paraguay) Colombia |
| 14 | MF | Cristian Andersen | 3 June 1984 (aged 18) | | (Paraguay) Sportivo Luqueño |
| 15 | FW | **Dante López** | 16 August 1983 (aged 19) | | (Paraguay) Sol de América |
| 16 | MF | Andrés Pérez Matto | 7 February 1984 (aged 18) | | (Paraguay) Olimpia Asunción |
| 17 | FW | Pedro Javier Velázquez | 13 May 1983 (aged 19) | | (Paraguay) Club Libertad |
| 18 | FW | Nelson Romero | 18 November 1984 (aged 18) | | (Paraguay) San Lorenzo |
| 19 | FW | Jesús Martínez | 27 September 1983 (aged 19) | | (Paraguay) Sportivo Trinidense |
| 20 | DF | Angel Ramos | 1 October 1983 (aged 19) | | (Paraguay) Club Guaraní |

== Uruguay ==
Coach: Jorge Orosmán da Silva (Uruguay)

| No. | Pos. | Player | Date of birth (age) | Caps | Goals | Club |
|---|---|---|---|---|---|---|
| 1 | GK | **Martín Silva** | March 25, 1983 (aged 19) | | | (Uruguayan Football Association) Defensor Sporting |
| 2 | DF | Nelson Semperena | February 19, 1984 (aged 18) | | | (Uruguayan Football Association) Defensor Sporting |
| 3 | DF | **Guillermo Rodríguez** | March 21, 1984 (aged 18) | | | (Uruguayan Football Association) Danubio |
| 4 | DF | Marcelo López | January 5, 1983 (aged 19) | | | (Uruguayan Football Association) River Plate |
| 5 | MF | Agustín Viana | August 23, 1983 (aged 19) | | | (Uruguayan Football Association) Nacional |
| 6 | DF | **Carlos Valdez** | May 2, 1983 (aged 19) | | | (Uruguayan Football Association) Nacional |
| 7 | MF | **Jorge Martínez** | April 5, 1983 (aged 19) | | | (Uruguayan Football Association) Montevideo Wanderers |
| 8 | MF | **Carlos Diogo** | July 18, 1983 (aged 19) | | | (Uruguayan Football Association) River Plate |
| 9 | FW | William Ferreira | February 25, 1983 (aged 19) | | | (Uruguayan Football Association) Nacional |
| 10 | MF | **Rubén Olivera** | May 4, 1983 (aged 19) | | | (Italian Football Federation) Juventus |
| 11 | MF | **Cristian Rodríguez** | September 30, 1985 (aged 17) | | | (Uruguayan Football Association) Peñarol |
| 12 | GK | **Sebastián Viera** | March 7, 1983 (aged 19) | | | (Uruguayan Football Association) Nacional |
| 13 | MF | Diego Montenegro | June 30, 1983 (aged 19) | | | (Uruguayan Football Association) Racing Club |
| 14 | DF | Álvaro Alonso | March 25, 1984 (aged 18) | | | (Uruguayan Football Association) Peñarol |
| 15 | DF | **Ignacio Ithurralde** | May 30, 1983 (aged 19) | | | (Uruguayan Football Association) Defensor Sporting |
| 16 | FW | Marcelo Guerrero | January 20, 1983 (aged 19) | | | (Uruguayan Football Association) Villa Española |
| 17 | MF | **Carlos Grossmüller** | May 4, 1983 (aged 19) | | | (Uruguayan Football Association) Danubio |
| 18 | FW | Richard Porta | August 1, 1983 (aged 19) | | | (Uruguayan Football Association) River Plate |
| 19 | FW | Andrés Rodríguez | January 21, 1983 (aged 19) | | | (Uruguayan Football Association) Defensor Sporting |
| 20 | MF | Eduardo Fernández | April 15, 1983 (aged 19) | | | (Uruguayan Football Association) Bella Vista |

(Source for player names:)
