= 2003 South American U-20 Championship =

2003 Sudamericano Sub-20

Tournament details
- Host country: Uruguay
- Dates: 4–28 January
- Teams: 10 (from 1 confederation)
- Venue: 3 (in 3 host cities)

Final positions
- Champions: Argentina (4th title)
- Runners-up: Brazil
- Third place: Paraguay
- Fourth place: Colombia

Tournament statistics
- Matches played: 35
- Goals scored: 104 (2.97 per match)
- Top scorer: (Argentina) Fernando Cavenaghi (8 goals)

The 2003 South American Youth Championship (Sudamericana sub-20) is a football competition contested by all ten U-20 national football teams of CONMEBOL. The tournament was held in Uruguay between 4 and 28 January 2003, it was the 21st time the competition has been held and the second to take place in Uruguay. Argentina won their fourth trophy.

== Venues ==
City / Town	Stadium	Capacity
Montevideo	Estadio Centenario	66,500
Colonia del Sacramento	Estadio Suppici	12,000
Maldonado, Uruguay	Estadio Domingo Burgueño	22,000

== Format ==
The teams are separated in two groups of five, and each team plays four matches in a pure round-robin stage. The three top competitors advance to a single final group of six, wherein each team plays five matches. The top four teams in the final group qualify to the 2003 FIFA U-20 World Cup.

== Squads ==
For a list of all the squads in the final tournament, see 2003 South American Youth Championship squads.

The following teams entered the tournament:

- Argentina
- Bolivia
- Brazil
- Chile
- Colombia
- Ecuador
- Peru
- Paraguay
- Uruguay (host)
- Venezuela

== First group stage ==
When teams finish level of points, the final order determined according to:

1. superior goal difference in all matches
2. greater number of goals scored in all group matches
3. better result in matches between tied teams
4. drawing of lots

=== Group A ===
Team	Pts	Pld	W	D	L	GF	GA
Brazil	12	4	4	0	0	15	0
Uruguay	9	4	3	0	1	10	4
Ecuador	6	4	2	0	2	4	6
Bolivia	3	4	1	0	3	3	14
Peru	0	4	0	0	4	3	11

==== Results ====
4 January
17:00

Brazil	3-0	Peru
Carvalho 23'; André Bahia 66'; Dudu 67'

Estadio Centenario, Montevideo
Referee: Héctor Baldassi (Argentina)
5 January
21:00

Uruguay	2–0	Ecuador
Valdez 41'; G. Rodríguez 88'

Estadio Centenario, Montevideo
Referee: Carlos Chandía (Chile)

7 January
17:15

Bolivia	0–7	Brazil
		Carlos Alberto 8'; Felipe Melo 11', 18'; Dagoberto 20' (pen.), 70'; Dudu 72'; William 89'

Estadio Centenario, Montevideo
Referee: Alberto Duque (Colombia)
7 January
21:00

Peru	1–4	Uruguay
Farfán 29' (pen.)		G. Rodríguez 3'; Martínez 14', 50'; Carlos Diogo 44'

Estadio Centenario, Montevideo
Referee: Atilio Invernizzi (Paraguay)

9 January
20:00

Bolivia	0–2	Ecuador
		Jáuregui 22' (o.g.); Guerrón 29'

Estadio Centenario, Montevideo
Referee: Gustavo Brand (Venezuela
10 January
22:00

Brazil	2–0	Uruguay
Carvalho 25', 76'

Estadio Centenario, Montevideo
Referee: Héctor Baldassi (Argentina)

11 January
17:00

Ecuador	0–3	Brazil
		Dagoberto 29' (pen.); William 44'; Wendel 80'

Estadio Centenario, Montevideo
Referee: Alberto Duque (Colombia)
12 January
19:00

Bolivia	2–1	Peru
Arce 9', 61'		Guevara 68'

Estadio Centenario, Montevideo
Referee: Atilio Invernizzi (Paraguay)

13 January
19:00

Ecuador	2–1	Peru
Miña 78'; Borja 90'		Farfán 89' (pen.)

Estadio Centenario, Montevideo
Referee: Carlos Chandía (Chile)
13 January
21:00

Uruguay	4–1	Bolivia
López 11'; A. Rodríguez 34'; Guerrero 45+1'; Porta 64'		J. L. Ortiz 37'

Estadio Centenario, Montevideo
Referee: Alberto Duque (Colombia)

=== Group B ===
Team	Pts	Pld	W	D	L	GF	GA
Argentina	9	4	3	0	1	7	3
Colombia	9	4	3	0	1	7	3
Paraguay	6	4	2	0	2	7	10
Chile	3	4	1	0	3	4	6
Venezuela	3	4	1	0	3	1	4

==== Results ====
6 January
20:00

Paraguay	4–2	Chile
B. López 39'; Ávalos 48'; D. López 63', 65'		Rubio 16'; Corrales 51'

Estadio Suppici (Colonia del Sacramento)
Referee: Martín Vázquez (Uruguay)
6 January
22:00

Argentina	2–1	Colombia
Cavenaghi 45+2', 82' (pen.)		Montaño 90+1' (pen.)

Estadio Suppici (Colonia del Sacramento)
Referee: Wagner Tardelli (Brazil)

8 January
20:00

Venezuela	0–1	Paraguay
		Ávalos 37'

Estadio Suppici (Colonia del Sacramento)
Referee: Mauricio Reinoso (Ecuador)
8 January
22:00

Chile	0–1	Argentina
		Cavenaghi 25'

Estadio Suppici (Colonia del Sacramento)
Referee: Víctor Rivera (Peru)

10 January
20:00

Argentina	0–1	Venezuela
		Estévez 38'

Estadio Suppici (Colonia del Sacramento)
Referee: Hebert Aguilera (Bolivia)
10 January
22:00

Colombia	1–0	Chile
Montaño 45' (pen.)

Estadio Suppici (Colonia del Sacramento)
Referee: Mauricio Reinoso (Ecuador)

12 January
20:00

Venezuela	0–2	Chile
		Rodríguez 75' (o.g.); Pinilla 89'

Estadio Suppici (Colonia del Sacramento)
Referee: Wagner Tardelli (Brazil)
12 January
22:00

Colombia	4–1	Paraguay
Ruiz 15'; Acosta 26', 57', 74'		D. López 90'

Estadio Suppici (Colonia del Sacramento)
Referee: Martín Vázquez (Uruguay)

14 January
20:00

Venezuela	0–1	Colombia
		Ruiz 55'

Estadio Suppici (Colonia del Sacramento)
Referee: Mauricio Reinoso (Ecuador)
14 January
22:00

Paraguay	1–4	Argentina
Romero 74'		Rivas 31'; Cavenaghi 41', 69'; Rodríguez 55'

Estadio Suppici (Colonia del Sacramento)
Referee: Jorge Larrionda (Uruguay)

== Final group ==
Team	Pts	Pld	W	D	L	GF	GA	Dif
Argentina	11	5	3	2	0	8	2	+6
Brazil	10	5	3	1	1	8	5	+3
Paraguay	9	5	2	3	0	8	6	+2
Colombia	7	5	2	1	2	9	7	+2
Uruguay	4	5	1	1	3	6	8	-2
Ecuador	0	5	0	0	5	4	15	-11

=== Results ===
16 January
21:05

Uruguay	1–1	Argentina
Olivera 32'		Pisculichi 82'

Estadio Centenario, Montevideo
Referee: Wilson Souza Mendonça (Brazil)
17 January
20:30

Ecuador	1–4	Colombia
Miña 7'		Montaño 4'; Aguilar 9', 28'; Araújo 91'

Estadio Domingo Burgueño, Maldonado
Referee: Gustavo Brand (Venezuela
17 January
22:30

Brazil	1–1	Paraguay
Carlos Alberto 20'		Ávalos 14'

Estadio Domingo Burgueño, Maldonado
Referee: Carlos Chandía (Chile)

19 January
21:05

Paraguay	2–1	Uruguay
D. López 51'; Martínez 91'		Olivera 24' (pen.)

Estadio Centenario, Montevideo
Referee: Héctor Baldassi (Argentina)
20 January
20:30

Argentina	4–0	Ecuador
Rivas 23'; Zabaleta 33'; Cavenaghi 63', 75'

Estadio Domingo Burgueño, Maldonado
Referee: Alberto Duque (Colombia)
20 January
22:30

Colombia	2–3	Brazil
Alves 51' (o.g.); Aguilar 90'		Melo 35'; William 62'; Jean 91'

Estadio Domingo Burgueño, Maldonado
Referee: Jorge Larrionda (Uruguay)

22 January
21:05

Uruguay	2–1	Ecuador
Guerrero 40', 62'		Barre 65'

Estadio Centenario, Montevideo
Referee: Wilson Souza Mendonça (Brazil)
23 January
20:00

Colombia	1–1	Paraguay
Ruiz 40'		Ávalos 2'

Estadio Domingo Burgueño, Maldonado
Referee: Héctor Baldassi (Argentina)
23 January
22:15

Brazil	0–1	Argentina
		Carrusca 70'

Estadio Domingo Burgueño, Maldonado
Referee: Carlos Amarilla (Paraguay)

25 January
18:30

Paraguay	1–1	Argentina
Dos Santos 75' (pen.)		Pinola 51'

Estadio Domingo Burgueño, Maldonado
Referee: Wilson Souza Mendonça (Brazil)
25 January
20:30

Colombia	2–1	Uruguay
Ruiz 20'; Anchico 87' (pen.)		Fernández 8'

Estadio Domingo Burgueño, Maldonado
Referee: Carlos Chandía (Chile)
25 January
22:30

Ecuador	0–2	Brazil
		Cleiton Xavier 66', 83'

Estadio Domingo Burgueño, Maldonado
Referee: Jorge Larrionda (Uruguay)

28 January
18:00

Ecuador	2–3	Paraguay
Borja 28'; Bolaños 81' (pen.)		B. López 44' (pen.); Barreto 73'; Rotela 88'

Estadio Centenario, Montevideo
Referee: Gustavo Brand (Venezuela
28 January
20:00

Brazil	2–1	Uruguay
Dagoberto 16'; Jussiê 89'		Martínez 64'

Estadio Centenario, Montevideo
Referee: Héctor Baldassi (Argentina)
28 January
22:00

Argentina	1–0	Colombia
Cavenaghi 75'

Estadio Centenario, Montevideo
Referee: Jorge Larrionda (Uruguay)

== Winners ==
2003 South American Youth Championship winners

Argentina
Fourth title

== Qualifiers for 2003 FIFA U-20 World Cup ==
- Argentina
- Brazil
- Paraguay
- Colombia

== Top scorers ==
8 goals

- (Argentina) Fernando Cavenaghi

4 goals

- (Brazil) Dagoberto
- (Colombia) Jaime Ruiz
- (Paraguay) Dante López
- (Paraguay) Erwin Ávalos

3 goals

- (Brazil) Daniel Carvalho
- (Brazil) Felipe Melo
- (Brazil) William
- (Colombia) Abel Aguilar
- (Colombia) Jhonny Acosta
- (Colombia) Víctor Montaño
- (Uruguay) Marcelo Guerrero
- (Uruguay) Jorge Martínez

2 goals

- (Argentina) Emanuel Benito Rivas
- (Bolivia) Juan Carlos Arce
- (Brazil) Carlos Alberto
- (Brazil) Cleiton Xavier
- (Brazil) Dudu Cearense
- (Ecuador) Roberto Mina
- (Ecuador) Félix Borja
- (Paraguay) Blas López
- (Paraguay) Ángel Martínez
- (Peru) Jefferson Farfán
- (Uruguay) Rubén Olivera
- (Uruguay) Guillermo Rodríguez
