= Cristián Muñoz (footballer, born 1983) =

Chilean footballer

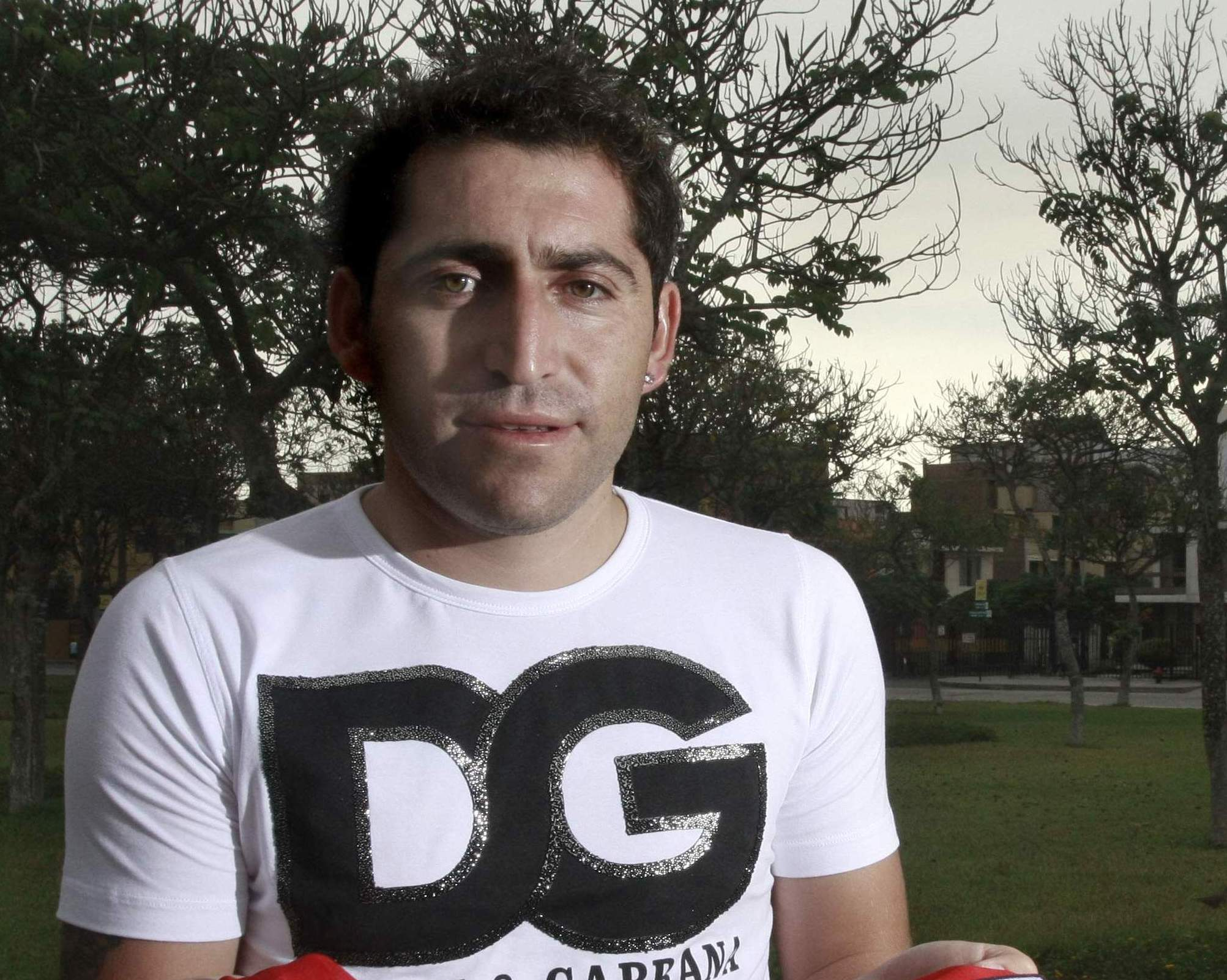
- Muñoz in 2009

Personal information
- Full name: Cristián Marcelo Muñoz Corrales
- Date of birth: 15 July 1983 (age 43)
- Place of birth: Santiago, Chile
- Position: Midfielder

Team information
- Current team: Universidad de Concepción (manager)

Youth career
- Universidad de Chile

Senior career*
Years	Team	Apps	(Gls)
2004	Universidad de Chile	44	(3)
2005	Cobreloa	7	(0)
2005–2006	Santiago Wanderers	17	(0)
2006	Santiago Morning	10	(2)
2007	Deportes Puerto Montt	18	(0)
2007–2008	Deportes Melipilla	20	(4)
2008	José Gálvez	15	(1)
2009	Total Chalaco	31	(8)
2010	Ilioupoli	17	(3)
2011	Coquimbo Unido	109	(22)
2012	Sport Boys	0	(0)
2012–2013	Coquimbo Unido	45	(9)
2014–2015	Iberia	30	(5)
2015–2016	Rangers	27	(3)
2016–2018	Barnechea	63	(13)
2019	Unión San Felipe	23	(1)
2020–2021	Barnechea	49	(3)
Total		525	(77)

International career
2003	Chile U20	4	(1)

Managerial career
- 2022: SIFUP
- 2022–2023: Santiago Morning
- 2024: Barnechea
- 2025: Universidad de Concepción
- 2026: Palestino
- 2026–: Universidad de Concepción
- * Club domestic league appearances and goals

Cristián Marcelo Muñoz Corrales (born 15 July 1983) is a Chilean football manager and former footballer who played as a midfielder. He is the current manager of Universidad de Concepción.

== Club career ==
He began his career in Universidad de Chile, then played on a loan in Cobreloa, then in Santiago Wanderers. In January 2010, it was announced that Corrales will play in Greek Championship of Beta Ethniki. Corrales was transferred to Ilioupoli F.C. He finished the season with fifteen appearances and three goals.

At the end of 2021 season, A.C. Barnechea announced the retirement of Muñoz from the football activity as a professional footballer.

== International career ==
Muñoz represented Chile at several youth levels, the most important of these is the 2003 South American U-20 Championship, without luck, in the category of Sudamericano of Uruguay. A part of that team together with Claudio Bravo, Mark González, Mauricio Pinilla, Gonzalo Fierro, Luis Jiménez, Jorge Valdivia, Miguel Pinto, Marco Estrada, Luis Pedro Figueroa, Miguel Aceval and Eduardo Rubio.

== Managerial career ==
Following his retirement as a professional player, he coached free agents at the SIFUP (Professional Footballers' Trade Union). On second half 2022, he took his first challenge as head coach in a professional club after joining Santiago Morning in the Primera B de Chile, being released in May 2023.

In 2024, he signed with Barnechea.

In 2025, Muñoz switched to Universidad de Concepción and won the 2025 Liga de Ascenso.

In December 2025, Muñoz assumed as manager of Palestino. He was released on 24 April 2026. On 4 August 2026, he returned to Universidad de Concepción.

== Personal life ==
He is nicknamed La Nona, a Spanish form of Nonna (grandmother in Italian). This nickname was given by his teammate Gamadiel García when he was 21 years old, due to the fact that he had many wrinkles in the face.

== Honours ==
=== Player ===
Universidad de Chile

- Primera División: 2004 Apertura

Barnechea

- Segunda División Profesional: 2016-17

=== Manager ===
Universidad de Concepción

- Primera B de Chile: 2025
