= FICA (disambiguation) =

FICA is the Federal Insurance Contributions Act in the United States.

FICA may also refer to:

== People with the surname ==
- Alin Fică (born 2001), Romanian footballer
- Fernando Fica (born 1983), Chilean footballer

== Organizations ==
=== Sports ===
- Federation of International Cricketers' Associations
- Football Inter Club Association, a Haitian association football club
- Fundacao International de Capoeira de Angola or International Capoeira Angola Foundation

=== Other ===
- Forum for International Conciliation and Arbitration

== Other uses ==
- Fića, a Serbian automobile
- Folded inverted conformal antenna
- Foreign Interference (Countermeasures) Act 2021, a law in Singapore dealing with foreign interference
