= Juan Toro =

Juan Toro may refer to:

- Juan Toro (footballer, born 1930) (1930–2007), Chilean football defender
- Juan Toro (footballer, born 1984) (born 1984), Chilean football midfielder
- Juan Pablo Toro (born 1976), Chilean football defender
