= Hugo Bravo =

Hugo Bravo may refer to:

- Hugo Bravo (footballer, born 1944)
- Hugo Bravo (footballer, born 1972)
