= Enzo Vera =

Chilean footballer (born 1983)

Personal information
- Full name: Enzo Andrés Vera Buchholz
- Date of birth: 7 April 1983 (age 43)
- Place of birth: Santiago, Chile
- Height: 1.71 m (5 ft 7 in)
- Position: Defensive midfielder

Youth career
- Colo-Colo

Senior career*
Years	Team	Apps	(Gls)
2002	Colo-Colo		
2003–2004	Iberia		
2005–2007	Temuco		
2008	Copiapó		
2009–2010	Naval		
2011–2012	Unión San Felipe		
2013	Deportes Linares		
- * Club domestic league appearances and goals as of 20 January 2017

Enzo Vera (born 7 April 1983) is a Chilean former footballer.

== Club career ==
Born in Santiago, he joined powerhouse Colo-Colo, playing in its youth ranks. In 2002, he was part of the Torneo Clausura’s team champion, which achieved the league title amid the club's bankruptcy. In that team highlighted players like Marcelo Barticciotto and Marcelo Espina.

In 2003, he left the club and signed for Deportes Iberia, playing there until the incoming year. Then in 2005, he moved to Deportes Temuco, when played until 2007 and was part of two relegations (to the second-tier or Primera B that 2005 and to third-tier two years later with Eduardo Bonvallet as coach).

In 2008 signed for Deportes Copiapó. The next year played for Deportes Naval until 2010.

In January 2011, he moved to Unión San Felipe, being a regular starter during the years that he played there. In late 2012, he left the club and finally in 2013 played in his last club of his career, Deportes Linares of the Chilean third-level in the age.

== Honours ==
=== Club ===
Colo-Colo

- Campeonato Nacional (Chile): 2002 Apertura
