= Estadio Profesor Alberto Suppici =

Stadium in Uruguay

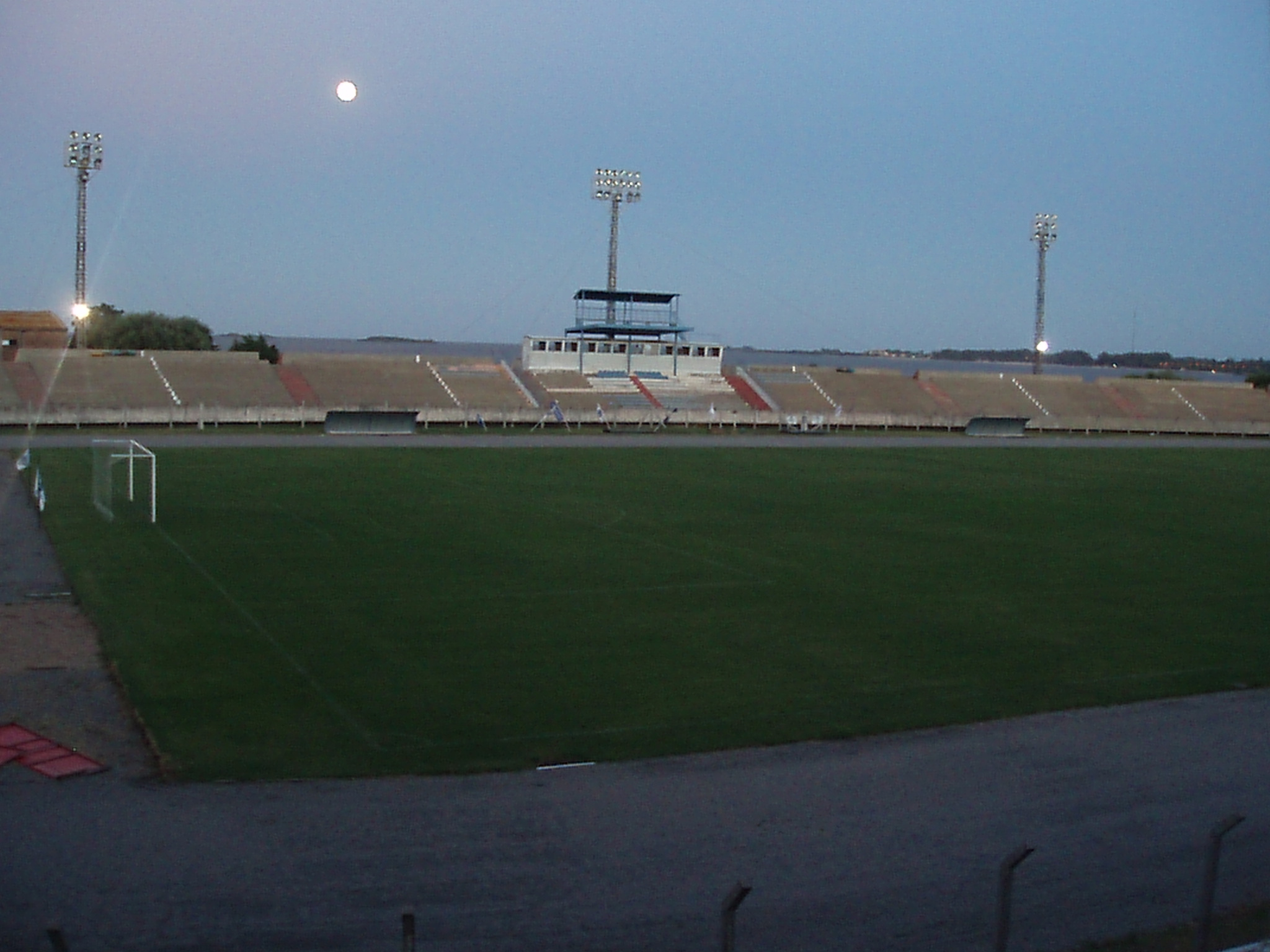
- Interactive map of Estadio Profesor Alberto Suppici
- Full name: Campus Municipal "Profesor Alberto Suppici"
- Location: Colonia del Sacramento, Uruguay
- Coordinates: 34°28′01″S 57°50′43″W
- Owner: Colonia Department
- Capacity: 6,500
- Surface: grass

Tenants
- Plaza Colonia; Local teams

Estadio Profesor Alberto Suppici is a multi-use stadium in Colonia, Uruguay. It is currently used mostly for football matches. The stadium holds 6,500 people. The stadium is named after Alberto Suppici, coach of Uruguay national football team during the 1930 World Cup. It is the home stadium of Plaza Colonia and hosted matches during the 2003 South American Youth Championship. The Estadio Profesor Alberto Suppici is also known as a venue for rugby union.
