= UAE Most Valuable Player =

The UAE Pro League Most Valuable Player is awarded by the Sheikh Majid Bin Mohammed Football Season Award.

== Best Emarati Player ==
Year	Footballer	Club	Nationality
2008	Faisal Khalil	Al-Ahli	United Arab Emirates
2009	Ismail Al Hammadi	Al-Ahli	United Arab Emirates

== Best Foreign Player ==
Year	Footballer	Club	Nationality
2008	Mehrzad Madanchi	Al-Nasr	Iran
2009	Jorge Valdivia	Al-Ain	Chile

== Wins By Club ==
#	Club	Winners
1	Al-Ahli	2
2	Al-Ain	1
3	Al-Nasr	1
