= Pablo Lenci =

Argentine footballer

Personal information
- Full name: Pablo Javier Lenci
- Date of birth: December 27, 1972 (age 53)
- Place of birth: San Nicolás de los Arroyos, Argentina
- Height: 1.83 m (6 ft 0 in)
- Position: Defender

Team information
- Current team: Deportes La Serena (assistant)

Youth career
- Newell's Old Boys

Senior career*
Years	Team	Apps	(Gls)
1991–1992	Newell's Old Boys	1	(0)
1993–1997	Coquimbo Unido	133	(7)
1998–1999	Deportes Iquique	60	(1)
2000	Santiago Morning	27	(0)
2001	Correcaminos UAT	25	(1)
2001–2003	Universidad Católica	77	(4)
2004	Audax Italiano	11	(0)
2004	Palestino	15	(0)
2005	Santiago Wanderers	30	(1)

Managerial career
- 2008: Independiente (assistant)
- 2009–2010: Argentinos Juniors (assistant)
- 2010: Boca Juniors (assistant)
- 2012–2013: Godoy Cruz (assistant)
- 2014–2015: Arsenal de Sarandí (assistant)
- 2015: Cobresal (assistant)
- 2016–2018: Universidad de Concepción (assistant)
- 2019: Pachuca (assistant)
- 2020–: Deportes La Serena (assistant)
- * Club domestic league appearances and goals

Pablo Javier Lenci is a former Argentine football defender. He was born on December 27, 1972, in the city of San Nicolás de los Arroyos in the Buenos Aires Province of Argentina. He played for most of his career in the Liga Chilena de Fútbol: Primera División.

== Club career ==
Lenci started his career at Newell's Old Boys of Rosario in the Primera Division Argentina in 1991. In 1992, he was part of the squad that won the Clausura tournament.

In 1993, he moved to Chile to play for Coquimbo Unido, he also played for Deportes Iquique and Santiago Morning before moving to Mexico for a brief spell with Correcaminos UAT in 2001.

On his return to Chilean football he joined Universidad Católica, where he won the second major title of his career; the Primera División Apertura of 2002.

In 2003, he left UC for brief spells with Audax Italiano, Palestino and Santiago Wanderers where he retired in 2005.

== Coaching career ==
Lenci started his coaching career in 2008, when he became the assistant coach of Claudio Borghi at Independiente. He left the club with Borghi in the beginning of October 2008. He followed Borghi to Argentinos Juniors (2009–2010) and a brief stint at Boca Juniors (2010).

Later when Borghi was hired to be a coach for the Chile national team, Lenci decided to stay in Argentina. Here he was contacted by Martín Palermo, who had recently retired as a professional footballer and later began his coaching career at Godoy Cruz on 28 November 2012, with Lenci as his assistant. They left the club at the end of 2013. On 16 April 2014, he followed Palermo to Arsenal de Sarandí, still as his assistant. They left the club exactly one year later in April 2015.

In 2015, he worked as assistant of Arturo Norambuena in Cobresal. At the end of 2016, on 1 November, Lenci joined Chilean club Universidad de Concepción as an assistant coach of Francisco Bozán. However, Lenci left his position at the club in the beginning of January 2019. A few days later, his former collaborator, Martín Palermo, once again as his assistant coach, this time at Mexican club Pachuca. They lasted until the end of 2019.

In February 2020, Lenci once again joined Francisco Bozán's coaching staff at Deportes La Serena as an assistant coach. After Bozán was fired, Lenci stayed at the club, still as an assistant coach, however, under the new manager Miguel Ponce.

== Honours ==
Newell's Old Boys

- Argentine Primera División (1): 1992 Apertura

Universidad Católica

- Primera División de Chile (1): 2002 Apertura
