= Jorge Valdivia =

Chilean footballer (born 1983)

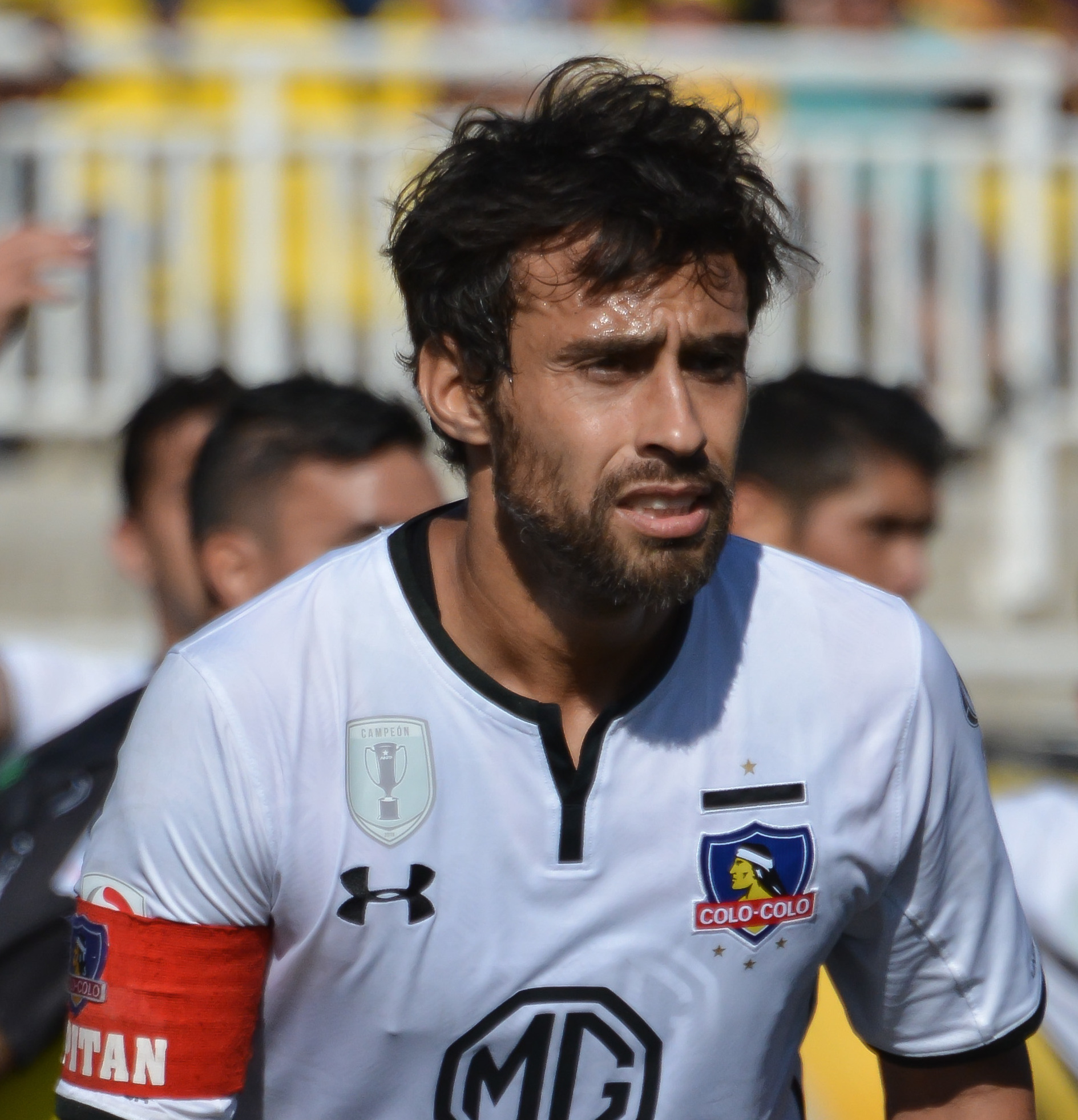
- Valdivia with Colo-Colo in 2018

Personal information
- Full name: Jorge Luis Valdivia Toro
- Date of birth: 19 October 1983 (age 43)
- Place of birth: Maracay, Venezuela
- Height: 1.73 m (5 ft 8 in)
- Position: Attacking midfielder

Youth career
- 1993–2002: Colo-Colo

Senior career*
Years	Team	Apps	(Gls)
2003–2006	Colo-Colo	40	(14)
2003	→ Universidad de Concepción (loan)	30	(7)
2004	→ Rayo Vallecano (loan)	5	(0)
2004	→ Servette (loan)	9	(2)
2006–2008	Palmeiras	53	(11)
2008–2010	Al Ain	25	(12)
2010–2015	Palmeiras	82	(7)
2015–2017	Al Wahda	34	(8)
2017–2019	Colo-Colo	41	(5)
2020	Morelia	3	(0)
2020	Mazatlán	3	(1)
2020–2021	Colo-Colo	3	(0)
2021	Unión La Calera	6	(1)
2022	Necaxa	4	(0)
Total		338	(67)

International career
2003	Chile U20	2	(0)
2004	Chile U23	7	(0)
2004–2017	Chile	78	(7)
Medal record
Men's football
Representing Chile
Copa América
Winner	2015 Chile
- * Club domestic league appearances and goals

Jorge Luis Valdivia Toro (Spanish pronunciation: [ˈxoɾxe ˈlwjs βalˈdjβja], born 19 October 1983) is a former professional footballer who played as an attacking midfielder. Born in Venezuela, he played for the Chile national team.

Product of Colo-Colo youth ranks, Valdivia had an impressing loan spell at Universidad de Concepción during his debut season in 2003. Then after another two loan spells in Europe, he definitely joined Colo-Colo in 2005 winning one year later the Torneo Apertura title, before moving to Palmeiras. Since joining Brazilian club, he spent seven years playing for Verdão — interrupted by his spell at Al Ain — and has appeared in more than 100 games, winning one Paulistão in 2008, a Copa do Brasil in 2012 and a Série B title in 2013.

A Chilean international between 2004 until 2017, he was an integral member of the 2015 Copa América winning squad (the first ever achieved by his national team in its history), having previously appeared in two past editions (2007 and 2011) and in the 2010 and 2014 World Cups. During his years active, Valdivia has reached 7 goals in 78 caps.

== Early life and background ==
Valdivia was born in Maracay, Venezuela, in 1983, to Chilean parents Luis Valdivia and Elizabeth Toro, because of his father's work as a correspondent for LAN airlines, which he did from 1974. In 1985, the Valdivia family returned their homeland moving to Santiago. There they settled in the commune of La Florida. Likely due to these years he spent in Venezuela, he was interested in baseball. After moving to Chile, he developed his taste for football.

== Club career ==
=== Early career ===
In 1993, Valdivia joined Colo-Colo’s football academy. He was promoted to first team in 2003, at the age of nineteen. Nevertheless, he was demotivated by his teammates, like captain Marcelo Espina, complemented by the misbehavior outside the field.

=== Colo-Colo ===
==== Loan to Universidad Concepción ====
After falling out of Colo-Colo's first team figures, Valdivia was loaned to fellow Chilean Primera División side Universidad de Concepción. He made his professional debut for Concepción on 16 March 2003, coming on as a second-half substitute for Pablo Abdala in a 2–1 Primera División away loss against Cobresal. During his first start on 6 April, he scored his team's last in a 3–1 home win against Unión Española.

Following that match, Valdivia became an undisputed starter for the club, contributing with the opener in a 4–3 home win against Universidad de Chile on 16 June, as his side qualified to the quarterfinals of the Torneo Apertura. In his first season at Concepción-based side, he impressed for his skills. There, Valdivia scored seven goals in 30 games.

==== Loans to Rayo Vallecano and Servette ====
That allowed him to go on loan again, this time to Segunda División side Rayo Vallecano, where he only played five matches and failed to score a goal.

After another loan spell at Switzerland's Servette, Valdivia could have played for Boca Juniors, club that was willing to pay US$1.5 million dollars for him, but nevertheless the talks about the transfer didn't have success and, finally, he definitely returned to Colo-Colo.

==== Return and breakthrough ====
In 2005, he returned to Colo-Colo. Likewise, that year he complemented his football career with studies of journalism at the University of the Americas, career which he didn't finished.

Then, in 2006, Valdivia helped his club to achieve the Torneo Apertura, where once again he reached an impressive performance, which was polished by the coach in the age, Claudio Borghi. Noteworthy, he highlighted in a team which had players like Chilean internationals Claudio Bravo, Matías Fernández and Humberto Suazo.

=== Palmeiras ===
On 5 August 2006, Valdivia completed his move to Brazilian club Palmeiras for a US$3.5 million transfer fee. His signing was the club's most expensive transfer – in the year – for a foreign player. After an unsuccessful season, he had a revitalizing 2007 where he reached four honours for his performances: Campeonato Paulista Most Valuable Player, Prêmio Craque do Brasileirão, Bola de Ouro and Troféu Mesa Redonda, that put him as the season's best playmaker of Brazilian football. His further consecration at the Verdão was the obtention of 2008 Campeonato Paulista title, where for his performances he came to cost US$40 dollars.

=== Al Ain ===
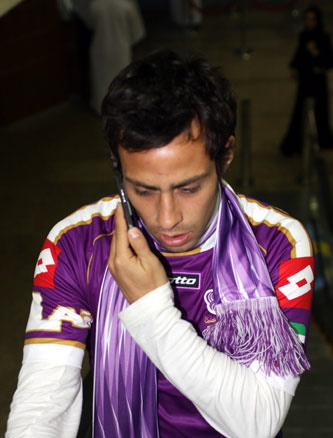
Valdivia with Al-Ain in 2008

In August 2008, it was reported that Valdivia joined United Arab Emirates' Al Ain in an €8 million deal for a two-year contract. At the Emirati club, he won the Etisalat Emirates Cup, President Cup and the Super Cup. There, he became a top idol in the history of the club, so much so that Mohamed bin Zayed Al Nahyan, president of the club, offered him a lifetime contract (which Valdivia didn't sign).

=== Palmeiras return ===
During and after the 2010 FIFA World Cup, there were persistent rumours about his possible return to Palmeiras, which finally occurred on 26 July following the agree between Al-Ain and São Paulo-based side for a €16 million deal. In his presentation on 14 August, Valdivia was received by 15.000 fans at Estádio do Pacaembu. However, he was heavily criticized for his bad performances and for being out of shape; a topic that was recurrent during all his spell at the club.

=== Al Wahda ===
On 25 June 2015, was reported that Valdivia would return to United Arab Emirates to sign for Al-Wahda, after rejecting an offer from China's Guangzhou Evergrande. The player and the club reached a two-season contract and a US$2.8 million salary per year.

=== Colo-Colo return ===
On 19 June 2017, Valdivia returned to his first club Colo-Colo. In December 2019, Colo-Colo announced they would be not renewing his contract.

=== Morelia ===
On January 16, 2020, Valdivia signed with Liga MX side Morelia.

=== Retirement ===
On 1 July 2022, Valdivia confirmed that he had already decided to retire from football on the radio program Los Tenores (The Tenors) from ADN Radio Chile, looking to become a football manager and to work in TV media.

== International career ==
Born in Venezuela, Valdivia was eligible to play for the national team of either country. However, he appeared with Chile's U20 in the 2003 South American Youth Championship, only making two appearances in a tournament which Chile finished last in the group stage.

Valdivia also represented his country in the 2004 Pre-Olympic Tournament — alongside players like Claudio Bravo, Jean Beausejour, Luis Pedro Figueroa or Mark González — where he had an impressive performance. In June of that year, he earned his first senior cap for Chile national team against Mexico. Also that year he became part of the 2006 FIFA World Cup qualifying nominees under Juvenal Olmos as head coach, who choose him to play the Pre-Olympic. Nevertheless, Chile failed to qualify the World Cup.

Valdivia scored his first international goal for Chile in an exhibition match against Paraguay in Vina del Mar on 16 November 2006 during a 3–2 victory.

In June 2007, Valdivia was chosen in Chile's Copa América squad, which they were eliminated in quarterfinals after a 6–1 thrash of Brazil. However, before the game against Brazil, he alongside five players went on a spree and once leaked the press they received a 20-game ban from the federation (ANFP). Then Nelson Acosta resigned as national team coach.

A year and half later, he was re-considered by Marcelo Bielsa after calling-up him to a friendly game with Turkey on 5 August 2008. One month later, on 7 September, Valdivia made his debut for the 2010 World Cup qualifying in a 3–0 loss with Brazil, which he was sent off for double-yellow card. On 10 October 2009, he scored the last goal of the 4–2 win over Colombia at Medellín that finished Chile's 12-year World Cup absence since 1998.

Being a key player during qualification, he was selected in the 23-man World Cup roster and participated in most of the preparatory games, scoring a goal even in a 3–0 win over Zambia in Calama. However at the World Cup, he performed well despite playing as the Second striker, highlighting his 35-yard though pass that broke Switzerland's defensive and allowed Esteban Paredes cross for Mark González header goal. Then Chile was eliminated after losing again to Brazil.

=== 2011–2014 ===
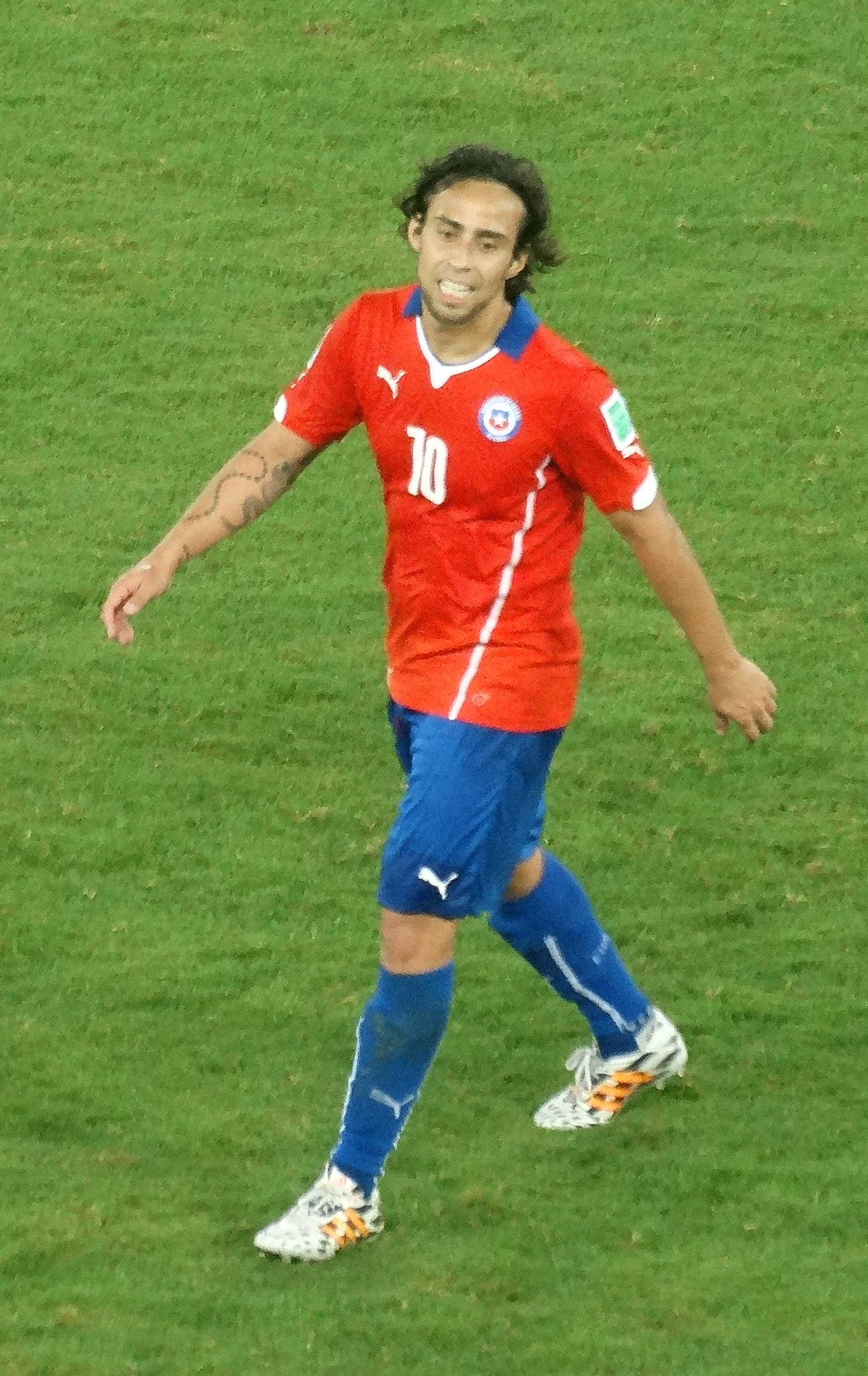
Valdivia in the match against Australia for the 2014 FIFA World Cup

In January 2011, Bielsa left abruptly stepped down as coach following differences with the federation, but Valdivia continued being considered in La Roja by Claudio Borghi, his former coach when he played in Colo-Colo. In June, he was included in the 23-man list to face the Copa América. He made three starts of Chile's four games in the competition, which they were eliminated in quarterfinals by Venezuela (where Valdivia had a crossbar), rival which only one-time Chile lost in its history. However, Valdivia was included in the team of the tournament. Months later in December 2011 before a 2014 World Cup qualifying game with Uruguay in Montevideo, he was involved in another scandal alongside Jean Beausejour, Gonzalo Jara, Arturo Vidal and Carlos Carmona after arriving 45 minutes later and intoxicated to the team's concentration at Juan Pinto Durán. They subsequently received a 10-game ban and Valdivia once finished the punishment it wasn't be considered by Borghi during the qualifiers and friendlies.

On 8 March 2013, after 16 months of the incident, Valdivia was re-called by Jorge Sampaoli, including him in the call-up for the qualifying games against Peru and Uruguay. His official re-debut was on 7 September against Venezuela in a 3–0 victory at Estadio Nacional. On 15 October, following a 2–1 win over Ecuador, Chile reached its eight qualification to a World Cup and its first consecutively.

On 1 June 2014, Valdivia was selected in Chile squad for the 2014 FIFA World Cup in Brazil. On 13 June, Valdivia scored his first World Cup goal during Chile's opening group match against Australia, netting the team's second goal in a 3–1 victory. The following two group games he came as substitute against Spain and the Netherlands, being an unused substitute in the round of 16 game against Brazil, which eliminated Chile on the penalties after 1–1 at Estádio Mineirão. The last fact motivated Valdivia to announce his international retirement, communicated via Twitter on 17 July 2014. However, in November he backtracked his decision later on, and was called for friendly matches against Venezuela and Uruguay, selling his re-debut with a goal and a brilliant performance in 5–0 win over the Venezuelans at Talcahuano.

=== 2015 Copa América ===
Participating in the most preparatory games prior the 2015 Copa América held in his country, Valdivia scored a goal against El Salvador (the game's only one score at Rancagua) and was included in the 23 man list to face the cup. On 12 June, he was a starter in the Copa América opening game with Ecuador: a 2–0 victory for Chile. The following group match with México, Valdivia was praised by the press for play the full 90 minutes, be trasendental in all Chile goals and for have scored a badly canceled goal during that 3–3 draw. After another highlighting match in a 5–0 win over Bolivia where assisted Alexis Sánchez in Chile's second goal, he was a key player in the 1–0 victory against Uruguay (defending champions) for the quarterfinals, match remembered by the incident between Gonzalo Jara and the striker Edinson Cavani. Following the semifinal's triumph over Perú (2–1) that put Chile in a Copa América final after 28 years since 1987,

Valdivia was a starter in the final against Argentina at the Estadio Nacional. However, he was replaced by Matías Fernández on 78th minute in a substitution before the extratime and the penalties, which infuriated him when he left the field. Finally, Chile won 4–1 on the penalties and reached its history's first ever continental title.

== Style of play ==
Valdivia was a classic "number 10" playmaker, widely regarded as a "fantastic talent" with exceptional technical ability. Nicknamed "El Mago" (The Magician), he was noted for his vision and his ability to execute precise, defence-splitting passes. Jorge Sampaoli, who coached Valdivia during his tenure with the Chilean national team, described him as an "irreplaceable talent." Despite his on-field brilliance, Valdivia's career was also marked by disciplinary issues; he served two lengthy bans from international football. Media outlets often characterized his career as a duality between his skill as a playmaker and a controversial off-field persona, frequently described as a "playboy" lifestyle.

== Personal life ==
Valdivia married Chilean model Daniela Aránguiz, with whom he has two children. Valdivia and Aránguiz are separated.

From 2023 to 2024, Valdivia was in a relationship with then Deputy, Maite Orsini.

About football, he has several relatives who have played it at different levels: His maternal grandfather, Juan Toro, who played for the Chile senior team; his uncle, Juan Toro Jr., who played for Palestino and other clubs; his older brother, Luis or Quique as he is known, who played at youth categories of Palestino; his half-brother, Hugo Bravo, who played for clubs such as Palestino and Universidad de Chile; and his younger brother, Claudio, who played for Audax Italiano and Palmeiras B.

=== Legal issues ===
In October 2024, Valdivia was arrested on two rape charges. Later, he was placed under nighttime house arrest.

== Post-retirement ==
In October and November 2021, Valdivia performed as a football commentator for the TV program ESPN F90 until he moved to Mexico to join Necaxa for the 2022 season. Following his definitive retirement from football, in July 2022 he returned to ESPN Chile as a panelist for the program ESPN F360.

== Career statistics ==
=== Club ===
Club	Season	League			Cup		Continental		Other		Total	
Club	Season	Division	Apps	Goals	Apps	Goals	Apps	Goals	Apps	Goals	Apps	Goals
Universidad de Concepción	2003	Chilean Primera División	30	7	1	0	—		—		31	7
Rayo Vallecano	2003–04	Segunda División	5	0	—		—		—		5	0
Servette	2004–05	Swiss Super League	9	2	2	1	—		—		11	3
Colo-Colo	2005	Chilean Primera División	21	10	—		0	0	—		21	10
Colo-Colo	2006	Chilean Primera División	19	4	—		2 (Note: Appearance(s) in Copa Libertadores)	0	—		21	4
Colo-Colo	Total		40	14	—		2	0	—		42	14
Palmeiras	2006	Série A	15	0	—		—		—		15	0
Palmeiras	2007	Série A	22	7	2	0	—		14 (Note: Appearance(s) in Campeonato Paulista)	3	38	10
Palmeiras	2008	Série A	16	4	4	1	—		20	9	40	14
Palmeiras	Total		53	11	6	1	—		34	12	93	24
Al Ain	2008–09	UAE Pro League	13	9	9	5	—		—		22	14
Al Ain	2009–10	UAE Pro League	12	3	2	0	4 (Note: Appearance(s) in AFC Champions League)	1	—		18	4
Al Ain	Total		25	12	11	5	4	1	—		40	18
Palmeiras	2010	Série A	15	2	—		4 (Note: Appearance(s) in Copa Sudamericana)	1	—		19	3
Palmeiras	2011	Série A	15	2	5	0	1	0	7	2	28	4
Palmeiras	2012	Série A	17	0	6	3	1	0	10	0	34	3
Palmeiras	2013	Série B	18	3	—		2	0	7	1	27	4
Palmeiras	2014	Série A	17	0	1	0	—		11	4	29	4
Palmeiras	2015	Série A	4	0	1	0	—		5	0	10	0
Palmeiras	Total		86	7	13	3	8	1	40	7	147	18
Al Wahda	2015–16	UAE Pro League	16	5	2	2	—		—		18	7
Al Wahda	2016–17	UAE Pro League	18	3	2	1	7	1	—		27	5
Al Wahda	Total		34	8	4	3	7	1	—		45	12
Colo-Colo	2017	Chilean Primera División	13	2	1	0	—		1 (Note: Appearance(s) in Supercopa de Chile)	0	15	2
Colo-Colo	2018	Chilean Primera División	18	1	0	0	10	0	0	0	28	1
Colo-Colo	Total		31	3	1	0	10	0	1	0	43	3
Career total			313	64	38	13	31	3	75	19	457	99

=== International ===
Chile
Year	Apps	Goals
2004	3	0
2005	6	0
2006	7	1
2007	7	0
2008	3	0
2009	9	2
2010	7	1
2011	8	0
2012	0	0
2013	4	0
2014	6	2
2015	12	1
2016	0	0
2017	6	0
Total	78	7

==== International goals ====
Scores and results list Chile's goal tally first.

No.	Date	Venue	Opponent	Score	Result	Competition
1.	15 November 2006	Estadio Sausalito, Viña del Mar, Chile	Paraguay	2–0	3–2	Friendly
2.	11 February 2009	Peter Mokaba Stadium, Polokwane, South Africa	South Africa	1–0	2–0	Friendly
3.	10 October 2009	Estadio Atanasio Girardot, Medellín, Colombia	Colombia	3–2	4–2	2010 FIFA World Cup qualification
4.	26 May 2010	Estadio Municipal de Calama, Calama, Chile	Zambia	3–0	3–0	Friendly
5.	13 June 2014	Arena Pantanal, Cuiabá, Brazil	Australia	2–0	3–1	2014 FIFA World Cup
6.	14 November 2014	Estadio CAP, Talcahuano, Chile	Venezuela	2–0	5–0	Friendly
7.	5 June 2015	Estadio El Teniente, Rancagua, Chile	El Salvador	1–0	1–0	Friendly

== Honours ==
Colo-Colo

- Primera División de Chile: 2006 Clausura, 2017 Transición
- Supercopa de Chile: 2017, 2018

Palmeiras

- Campeonato Paulista: 2008
- Copa do Brasil: 2012, 2015
- Campeonato Brasileiro Série B: 2013

Al Ain

- Etisalat Emirates Cup: 2008
- UAE President Cup: 2008–09
- UAE Super Cup: 2009

Al Wahda

- UAE League Cup: 2015–16

Chile

- Copa América: 2015

Individual

- Bola de Prata: 2007
- Campeonato Brasileiro Série A Team of the Year: 2007
- Troféu Mesa Redonda: 2007
- Campeonato Paulista Most Valuable Player: 2007, 2008
- South American Team of the Year: 2007
- UAE Most Valuable Player: 2009
- Copa América top assist provider: 2015
- Primera División de Chile Best Player: 2017
