= Jaime Ruiz (Colombian footballer) =

Colombian footballer (born 1984)

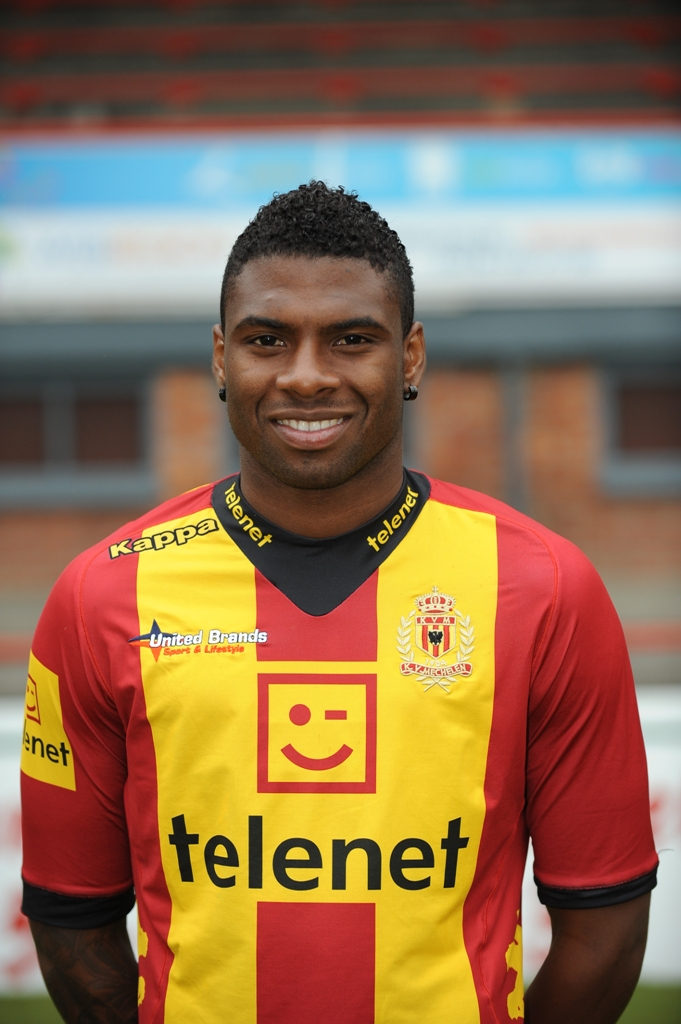

Personal information
- Full name: Jaime Alfonso Ruiz
- Date of birth: 3 January 1984 (age 42)
- Place of birth: Cali, Colombia
- Height: 1.95 m (6 ft 5 in)
- Position: Forward

Senior career*
| Years | Team | Apps | (Gls) |
| 2003–2005 | Cortuluá | 25 | (6) |
| 2005 | Aucas | | |
| 2006 | Deportivo Pasto | 11 | (0) |
| 2007 | Cienciano | 13 | (1) |
| 2007–2008 | Alianza Atlético | 37 | (13) |
| 2008–2011 | Westerlo | 43 | (19) |
| 2011–2013 | Mechelen | 25 | (5) |
| 2013–2014 | Westerlo | 21 | (5) |
| 2014 | Heist | 0 | (0) |

International career
| 2003 | Colombia | 1 | (0) |
- * Club domestic league appearances and goals

Jaime Alfonso Ruiz (born 3 January 1984) is a Colombian former professional footballer who played as a forward.

== Club career ==
Ruiz previously played for Alianza Atlético and Cienciano in the Primera Division Peruana. He scored 18 goals in the 2008/09, although the Belgian league website lists his tally as 17. This is because of an error they make in counting his goal, but failing to add it to his total.. His club website also lists 18 goals.

== International career ==
Ruiz played with the Colombia U20 national team at the 2003 FIFA World Youth Championship in UAE, helping Colombia finish third by beating Argentina 2–1.
