= Juan Toro (footballer, born 1930) =

Chilean footballer (1930–2007)

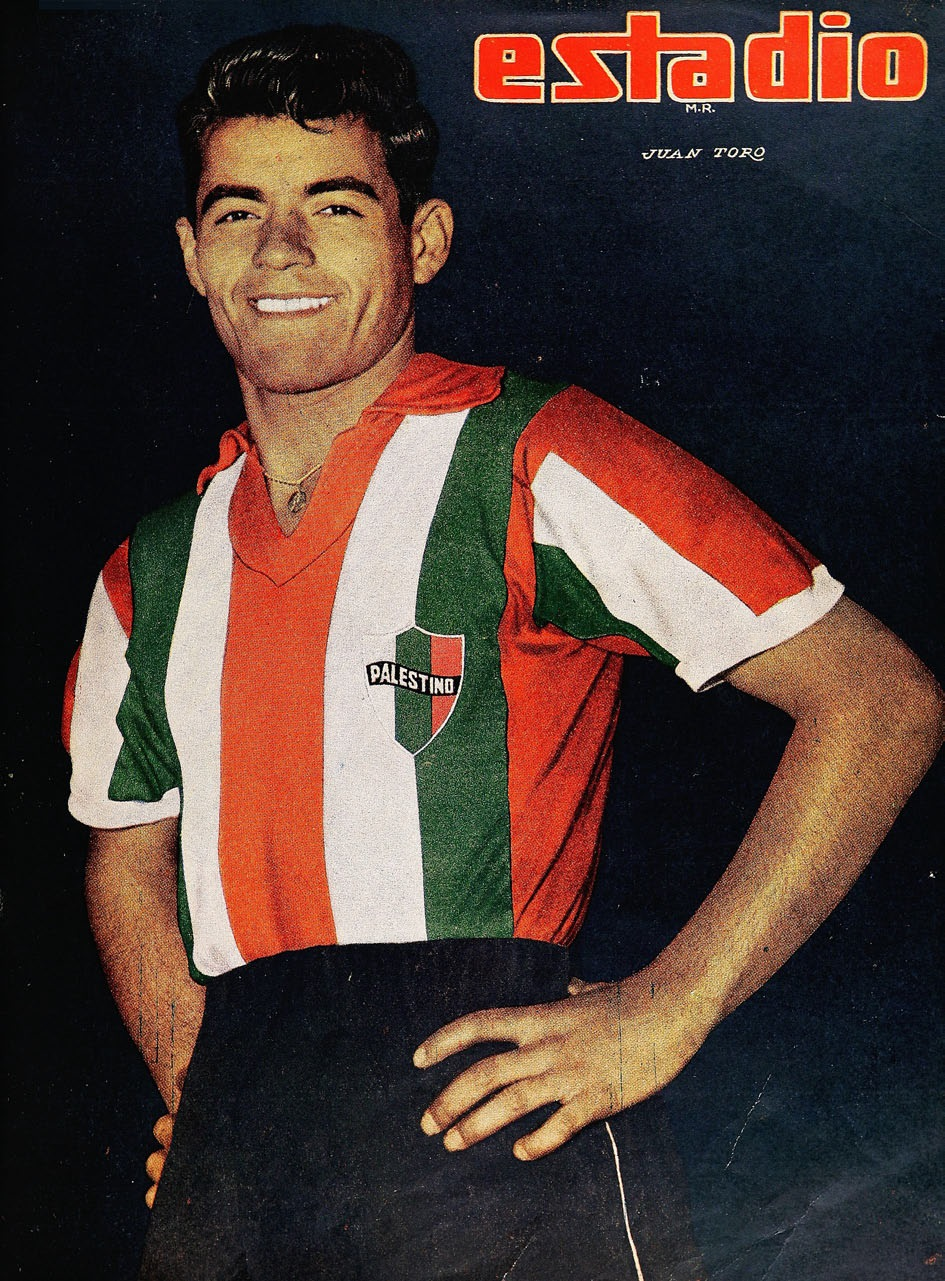
- Toro on the cover of Estadio in 1954

Personal information
- Full name: Juan Agustín Toro Ramírez
- Date of birth: 23 July 1930
- Place of birth: Santiago, Chile
- Date of death: 13 June 2007 (aged 76)
- Place of death: Santiago, Chile
- Position: Left-half

Youth career
- Estrella Blanca

Senior career*
Years	Team	Apps	(Gls)
1952	Audax Italiano		
1953–1964	Palestino		
1966–1967	Coquimbo Unido		
- Miraflores

International career
1957	Chile	2	(0)
- * Club domestic league appearances and goals

Juan Agustín Toro Ramírez (23 July 1930 – 13 June 2007) was a Chilean footballer who played as a left-half.

== Club career ==
A defensive left-half, Toro played for Club Estrella Blanca from Yarur neighbourhood, Santiago, alongside his four brothers in his early years.

At professional level, he began his career with Audax Italiano in 1952. The next year, he switched to Palestino and played for them from 1953 to 1964, always in the top division, winning the league title in the 1955 season.

His last club at professional level was Coquimbo Unido in the Chilean Segunda División.

== International career ==
As a player of Palestino, he made two appearances for the Chile national team in the 1958 World Cup qualifiers against Bolivia (away, 3–0 loss) and Argentina (home, 2–0 loss) in 1957.

== Personal life ==
Toro was the grandfather of the former footballer Hugo Bravo Toro, whom he reared, and his three half-brothers: Luis, who was in the Palestino youth ranks, Jorge, a well-known Chile international and Claudio Valdivia Toro, who played for Audax Italiano and Palmeiras B.

He had a friendship with the former Chile international Jorge Toro.

He died on 13 June 2007 after being run over near his work in a hotel in Santiago.

== Legacy ==
His name, and that of his teammates who won the 1955 league title with Palestino, were included in the lyrics of the club's anthem.

On 6 April 1965, Toro was one of the constituent footballers of SIFUP, the trade union of professionales footballers in Chile, alongside fellows such as Misael Escuti, Francisco Valdés, Hugo Lepe, among others.
