= Mauricio Pinilla =

Chilean footballer

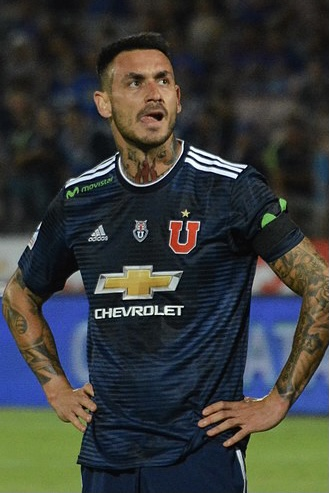
- Pinilla with Universidad de Chile in 2018

Personal information
- Full name: Mauricio Ricardo Pinilla Ferrera
- Date of birth: 4 February 1984 (age 42)
- Place of birth: Santiago, Chile
- Height: 1.87 m (6 ft 2 in)
- Position: Striker

Youth career
- Universidad de Chile

Senior career*
Years	Team	Apps	(Gls)
2002–2003	Universidad de Chile	39	(20)
2003–2004	Inter Milan	0	(0)
2003–2004	→ Chievo (loan)	6	(0)
2004	→ Celta (loan)	6	(0)
2004–2007	Sporting CP	20	(5)
2006	→ Racing Santander (loan)	13	(1)
2006–2007	→ Hearts (loan)	3	(2)
2007	→ Universidad de Chile (loan)	4	(2)
2007–2008	Hearts	2	(0)
2008	Vasco da Gama	3	(0)
2009	Apollon Limassol	5	(2)
2009–2010	Grosseto	24	(24)
2010–2012	Palermo	35	(10)
2012	→ Cagliari (loan)	14	(8)
2012–2014	Cagliari	49	(14)
2014–2015	Genoa	12	(3)
2015	→ Atalanta (loan)	14	(6)
2015–2016	Atalanta	24	(6)
2017	Genoa	12	(0)
2017–2018	Universidad de Chile	21	(14)
2019–2021	Coquimbo Unido	26	(8)
Total		332	(135)

International career
2001	Chile U17	3	(5)
2003	Chile U20	3	(1)
2003–2016	Chile	45	(8)
Medal record
Representing Chile
Winner	Copa América	2015
Winner	Copa América Centenario	2016
- * Club domestic league appearances and goals

Mauricio Ricardo Pinilla Ferrera (born 4 February 1984) is a Chilean former professional footballer who played as a striker.

After beginning his career at Universidad de Chile, he signed for Inter Milan at the age of 19, but never appeared for the club in four years. He went on to play in five countries, mainly Italy.

A Chile international since 2003, Pinilla represented the country at the 2014 World Cup and two Copa América, winning the 2015 and 2016 editions of the latter tournament.

== Club career ==
=== Early career ===
Born in Santiago, Pinilla started his career with Club Universidad de Chile, leaving for European football and Italian giants Inter Milan in 2003 after signing a five-year contract.

However, he was immediately sold to fellow Serie A club AC ChievoVerona (which acquired 50% of the player's rights), and finished the 2003–04 season on loan again, to La Liga side RC Celta de Vigo, not managing to score in a total of 12 league appearances.

=== Journeyman ===
In July 2004, Sporting CP bought 50% of his playing rights and Pinilla, having spent much of the season on a low note, finished it with five goals, notably a hat-trick in a 3–0 away win against S.C. Braga on 1 May 2005.

However, he was also unable to settle at Sporting and, in January 2006, would move on loan, finishing the campaign at Racing de Santander. On 26 February 2006 he netted his only goal for the Cantabria team, a penalty kick in a 2–2 draw at Deportivo Alavés.

In 2006–07, Pinilla was once again loaned, now to Heart of Midlothian. His time in Edinburgh was beset by injuries, resulting in him only playing a handful of times for the first team; in February 2007, he returned to Universidad de Chile.

Pinilla returned to Hearts for pre-season training ahead of the 2007–08 season, with the club buying out Sporting's half of his rights. However, his return suffered a major setback when it was revealed the player had a fractured scaphoid wrist bone, a hidden injury sustained while still in Chile; this put him out of action for a six further weeks.

On 9 January 2008, Pinilla sustained another injury in training that sidelined him for the rest of the campaign. On 6 May, his agent stated that he had signed a deal which would keep him at Tynecastle Park until 2011, after his contract with Inter expired the following month. However, on 1 July, Hearts announced that they had released the forward.

Pinilla joined Brazil's CR Vasco da Gama in early September 2008, signing a contract until the end of the season. He played his first match with his new club in a 1–0 home defeat to CR Flamengo, in a derby.

After Vasco was relegated to the Série B, Pinilla left and moved to Cyprus' Apollon Limassol FC as a free agent.

=== Back to Italy and Serie A ===
Pinilla returned to Italy in August 2009, joining Serie B's US Grosseto 1912 on a free transfer. At the Tuscan club, his once promising career got back on track, as he scored 24 goals in 24 games – including a series of 12 consecutive matches netting, a competition record– and finished the campaign as the second best scorer despite missing more than a third of the fixtures through different injuries.

In June 2010, US Città di Palermo announced the signing of Pinilla. He scored five league goals in his first 12 appearances, being an important attacking unit in a side that also included Abel Hernández, Massimo Maccarone and Fabrizio Miccoli.

On 11 September 2011, in the season's opener, Pinilla was brought from the bench to score the 4–2 for Palermo against his former team Inter, in an eventual 4–3 home win. On 25 January of the following year he was loaned to Cagliari Calcio in the same league, with the Sardinians having the option of making the move permanent in June.

Pinilla joined Cagliari on a permanent basis on 2 July 2012. Two years later, after an average of seven league goals per season, he moved to Genoa CFC on a 2+1 years deal.

Whilst at the service of Atalanta BC, on loan, Pinilla scored arguably one of the best goals of the season in Italy on 4 April 2015, after netting through a bicycle kick in a 1–2 home loss to Torino FC. He added a further five during his five-month tenure, being crucial as his team narrowly avoided relegation as 17th.

On 5 January 2017, Pinilla returned to Genoa on a loan with an obligation to buy, replacing Leonardo Pavoletti who left for SSC Napoli.

=== Return to Universidad ===
On 21 July 2017, aged 33 and ten years after last leaving the club, Pinilla terminated his contract with Genoa and returned to Universidad de Chile. He retired in February 2021, following a two-year spell at Coquimbo Unido who were relegated from the Chilean Primera División at the end of the 2020 season.

== International career ==
Pinilla earned the first of his 45 caps for Chile on 30 March 2003 in a friendly against Peru, closing a 2–0 win through a header, and later led his country's scoring in the 2006 FIFA World Cup qualifiers with three goals. However, on 27 February 2007, whilst on loan to Universidad de Chile, he was caught in a hotel with María José López, the model wife of national team captain Luis Antonio Jiménez.

Subsequently, Pinilla announced his decision to retire from the international scene. In August 2010 he returned to the team, being recalled by manager Marcelo Bielsa for an exhibition game with Ukraine. He was also picked for a match against Uruguay later in November of the following year, only to be called off due to injury.

Pinilla was selected for the 2014 World Cup in Brazil. He made his debut in the tournament on 14 June, playing two minutes in a 3–1 group stage victory over Australia and being involved in Jean Beausejour's goal. Again from the bench, he appeared in the round-of-16 against the hosts: his 119th minute shot hit the bar with the score at 1–1, and he later missed his penalty shootout attempt in an eventual elimination.

Pinilla was a member of the squad which won the 2015 Copa América on home soil for their first continental honour, contributing two late substitute appearances. On 29 March 2016, he and Arturo Vidal scored twice each in a 4–1 away defeat of Venezuela in qualification for the 2018 World Cup.

== Post-retirement ==
In March 2021, Pinilla joined ESPN Chile as a commentator and analyst along with fellow former footballer Marcelo Espina. That same year, he moved to Televisión Nacional de Chile as host of non-football shows.

In August 2026, Pinilla joined the talent show Fiebre de Canto (Singing Fever) from Chilevisión as a competitor. He left ESPN the following month.

== Personal life ==
Pinilla's nephew, Felipe Miranda, played youth football with Colo-Colo, being at that point followed by Palermo.

== Career statistics ==
=== Club ===
As of 3 December 2017

Appearances and goals by club, season and competition
Club	Season	League		National cup		League cup		Continental		Total	
Club	Season	Apps	Goals	Apps	Goals	Apps	Goals	Apps	Goals	Apps	Goals
Universidad de Chile	2002 (Note: Includes Apertura and Clausura)	25	10	—		—		—		25	10
Universidad de Chile	2003 (Note: Includes Apertura and Clausura)	14	10	—		—		—		14	10
Universidad de Chile	Total	39	20	—		—		—		39	20
Inter Milan	2003–04	0	0	—		—		—		0	0
Chievo (loan)	2003–04	6	0	2	0	—		—		8	0
Celta (loan)	2003–04	6	0	2	2	—		2	0	10	2
Sporting CP	2004–05	16	5	1	0	—		4	1	21	6
Sporting CP	2005–06	4	0	0	0	—		3	1	7	1
Sporting CP	Total	20	5	1	0	—		7	2	28	7
Racing Santander (loan)	2005–06	13	1	—		—		—		13	1
Hearts (loan)	2006–07	3	2	0	0	0	0	3	0	6	2
Universidad de Chile (loan)	2007 Apertura	4	2	—		—		—		4	2
Hearts	2007–08	2	0	—		0	0	—		2	0
Vasco da Gama	2008	3	0	—		—		—		3	0
Apollon Limassol	2008–09	5	2	—		—		—		5	2
Grosseto	2009–10	24	24	1	0	—		—		25	24
Palermo	2010–11	22	8	3	0	—		6	1	31	9
Palermo	2011–12	13	2	0	0	—		1	0	14	2
Palermo	Total	35	10	3	0	—		7	1	45	11
Cagliari (loan)	2011–12	14	8	—		—		—		14	8
Cagliari	2012–13	23	7	3	2	—		—		26	9
Cagliari	2013–14	26	7	1	1	—		—		27	8
Cagliari	Total	49	14	4	3	—		—		54	17
Genoa	2014–15	12	3	2	1	—		—		14	4
Atalanta (loan)	2014–15	14	6	—		—		—		14	6
Atalanta	2015–16	20	5	1	1	—		—		21	6
Atalanta	2016–17	4	1	0	0	—		—		4	1
Atalanta	Total	24	6	1	1	—		—		25	6
Genoa	2016–17	12	0	1	1	—		—		13	1
Universidad de Chile	2017	11	7	4	2	—		—		15	9
Career total		296	110	22	10	0	0	19	3	337	123

=== International ===
Appearances and goals by national team and year
National team	Year	Apps	Goals
Chile	2003	7	2
Chile	2004	6	1
Chile	2005	5	2
Chile	2006	3	0
Chile	2011	1	0
Chile	2012	1	0
Chile	2013	1	0
Chile	2014	9	1
Chile	2015	4	0
Chile	2016	8	2
Total		45	8

Scores and results list Chile's goal tally first, score column indicates score after each Pinilla goal.

List of international goals scored by Mauricio Pinilla
No.	Date	Venue	Opponent	Score	Result	Competition
1	30 March 2003	Estadio Nacional, Santiago, Chile	Peru	2–0	2–0	Friendly
2	9 September 2003	Estadio Nacional, Santiago, Chile	Peru	1–0	2–1	2006 FIFA World Cup qualification
3	1 June 2004	Polideportivo Pueblo Nuevo, San Cristóbal, Venezuela	Venezuela	1–0	1–0	2006 FIFA World Cup qualification
4	9 February 2005	Sausalito, Viña del Mar, Chile	Ecuador	3–0	3–0	Friendly
5	30 March 2005	Defensores del Chaco, Asunción, Paraguay	Paraguay	1–2	1–2	2006 FIFA World Cup qualification
6	4 June 2014	Elías Figueroa Brander, Valparaíso, Chile	Northern Ireland	2–0	2–0	Friendly
7	29 March 2016	Agustín Tovar, Barinas, Venezuela	Venezuela	1–1	4–1	2018 FIFA World Cup qualification
8	29 March 2016	Agustín Tovar, Barinas, Venezuela	Venezuela	2–1	4–1	2018 FIFA World Cup qualification

== Honours ==
Chile

- Copa América: 2015, 2016
