= Juan Toro (footballer, born 1984) =

Chilean footballer

Personal information
- Full name: Juan Andrés Toro Gaete
- Date of birth: 17 May 1984 (age 42)
- Place of birth: Santiago, Chile
- Position: Defender

Youth career
- Magallanes

Senior career*
Years	Team	Apps	(Gls)
2001–2008	Magallanes		
2008	Ñublense		
2008	Progreso Noetinger		
2009	Deportivo Morón		
2010	San Marcos	17	(1)

International career
2003	Chile U20		
- * Club domestic league appearances and goals

Juan Andrés Toro Gaete (born 17 May 1984) is a Chilean former footballer who played as a defender. Besides Chile, he played in Argentina.

== Career ==
Toro made his professional debut in 2001 with Magallanes and stay with them until 2008. In 2008, he switched to Ñublense in the Chilean top division. In the same year, he moved abroad and joined club Progreso from Noetinger, Córdoba, Argentina.

In 2009, he switched to Deportivo Morón. The next year, he returned to his homeland and played for San Marcos de Arica.

At international level, he represented Chile at under-20 level in the 2003 South American Championship.

== After football ==
Toro has gone on playing football at amateur level in clubs such as Juventud Norambuena from Santiago.
