= Luis Jiménez (footballer, born 1984) =

Chilean footballer (born 1984)

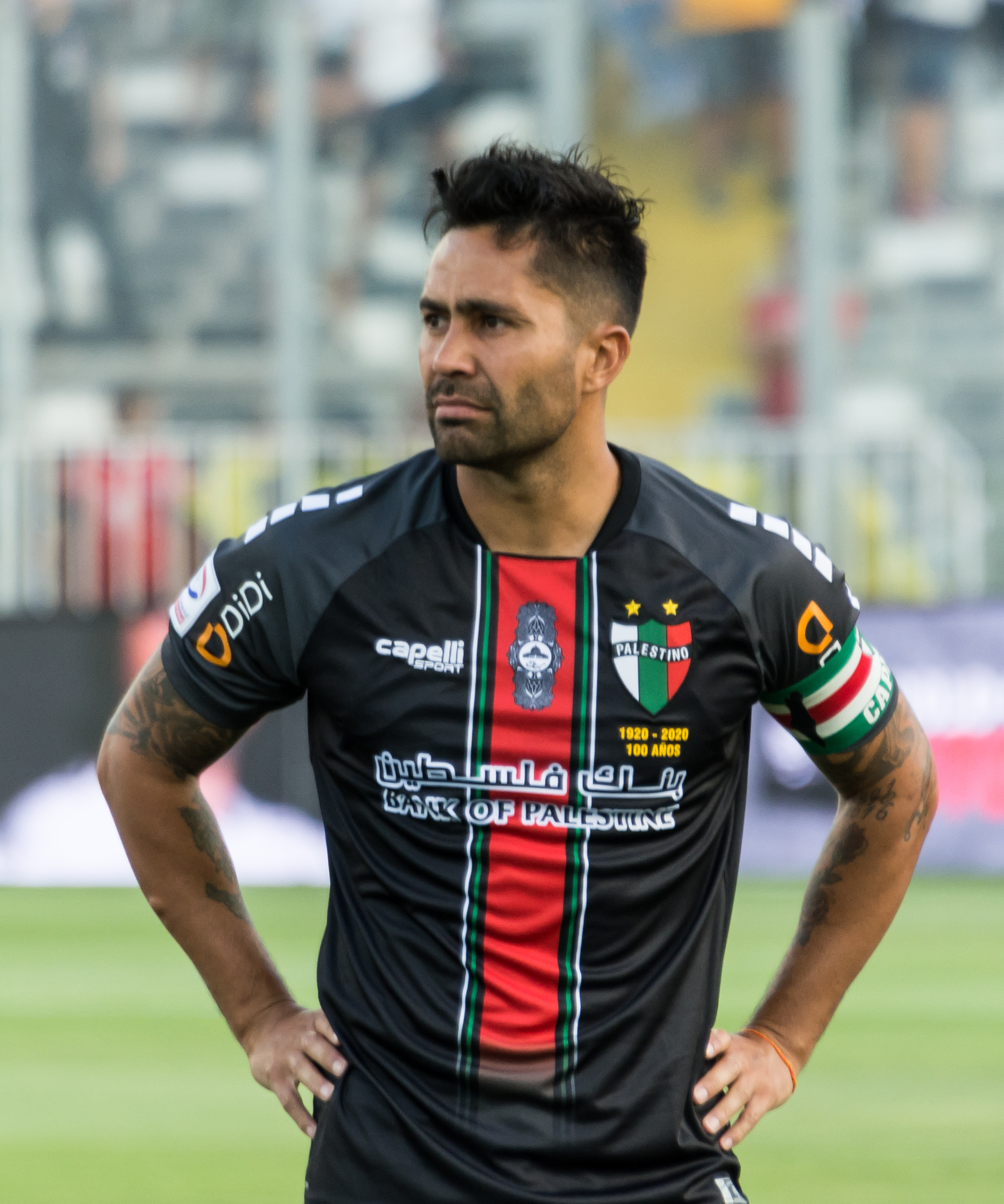
- Jiménez with Palestino in 2019

Personal information
- Full name: Luis Antonio Jiménez Garcés
- Date of birth: 17 June 1984 (age 42)
- Place of birth: Santiago, Chile
- Height: 1.83 m (6 ft 0 in)
- Position: Attacking midfielder

Team information
- Current team: Al-Wakrah (assistant)

Youth career
- Palestino

Senior career*
Years	Team	Apps	(Gls)
2001–2002	Palestino	9	(0)
2002–2006	Ternana	88	(25)
2006	Fiorentina	19	(3)
2006–2007	Ternana	0	(0)
2007	→ Lazio (loan)	16	(2)
2007–2010	Inter Milan	21	(3)
2009–2010	→ West Ham United (loan)	11	(1)
2010	→ Parma (loan)	12	(1)
2010	Ternana	0	(0)
2010–2011	→ Cesena (loan)	31	(9)
2011–2015	Al-Ahli	80	(40)
2015–2016	Al-Nasr	23	(9)
2016–2017	Al-Arabi	22	(10)
2017–2018	Al-Gharafa	11	(3)
2018	→ Qatar SC (loan)	8	(0)
2018–2019	Palestino	20	(5)
2019	Al-Ittihad	2	(0)
2020–2022	Palestino	57	(22)
2022	Magallanes	5	(1)
Total		435	(134)

International career
2001	Chile U17		
2003	Chile U20	3	(0)
2004–2021	Chile	33	(3)

Managerial career
- 2026–: Al-Wakrah (assistant)
- * Club domestic league appearances and goals

Luis Antonio Jiménez Garcés (born 17 June 1984) is a Chilean former professional footballer who played as an attacking midfielder.

He was also a member of the Chile national team from 2004 to 2021, playing at the Copa América in 2004 and 2011.

== Club career ==
=== Early career ===
Born in Santiago, Chile, Jiménez played youth football for Palestino in Chile, a club mostly made up of players of Palestinian descent. He gained Palestinian citizenship in June 2013. He started his Italian footballing career in 2002 at Ternana. During the January 2006 transfer window, Jimenez moved to Serie A side Fiorentina while remaining under joint ownership with his former club, for €3 million. For Fiorentina, he generally played as a right sided winger, striker or occasionally a centre forward. His right foot is his strongest but he can also make good use of his left. He made 19 appearances during the 2005–06 season for Fiorentina, scoring 3 goals in the process.

In late June 2006, Ternana purchased back half of the rights to Jiménez from Fiorentina for €3 million. Since Ternana were to play in the Italian Serie C1 in the 2006–07 season, it was highly unlikely that Jimenez would remain with them. However, although a loan deal was reached with Serie A Lazio, with an option to make the deal permanent at the end of the loan, Ternana changed the terms and made extortionate demands, which included Lazio paying the salaries of four of Ternana's players. The deal fell through and Jiménez remained at Ternana. The unhappy player stated that he would not play for Ternana again and asked FIFA to intervene and annul his contract with Ternana because of their unfair treatment.

=== Lazio ===
On 15 January 2007, Lazio finally agreed a move for Jiménez with the first season on loan, for €311,000 and on 27 January he played his first match for Lazio against Palermo.

=== Inter Milan ===
On 15 July 2007, Inter Milan signed him on loan from Ternana, for €1 million. He scored his first Inter goal in extra time in the Champions League against Fenerbahce. He was rewarded with his first Inter start on 2 December against Fiorentina, where he scored the opening goal. He also started the subsequent match against Lazio on 5 December, where he set up Maicon's goal.

At the end of the 2007–08 season, Inter officially signed him on a co-ownership deal, for €6.3 million on a three-year contract. Under coach Jose Mourinho, he played his first game against Roma coming on as a second-half substitute and scored a penalty in Inter's Italian Supercup win. Jiménez played his first game of the 2008–09 Serie A year against Sampdoria on 30 August 2008, but unfortunately picked up an injury later in a practice session. He returned from injury on 30 November 2008 when he was subbed in Inter Milan's Serie A game against Napoli. A subsequent long-term injury limited Jiménez to a total of six appearances for the 2008–09 Serie A season.

The co-ownership deal with Ternana was renewed on 23 June 2009.

==== West Ham United ====
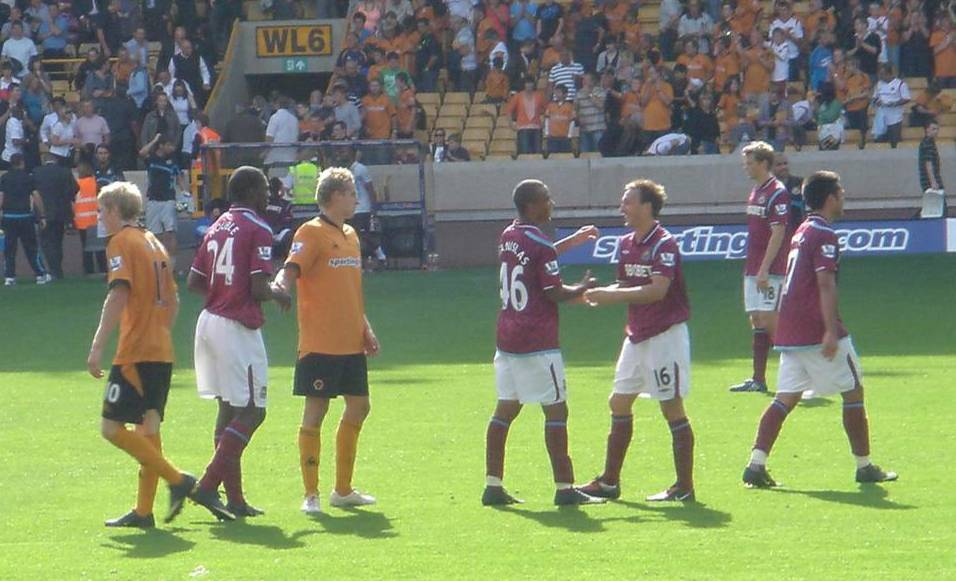
Jiménez (1st West Ham player on right) at the end of his debut game against Wolverhampton Wanderers. Other West Ham players are Frank Nouble, Junior Stanislas, Mark Noble and Jonathan Spector

Jiménez signed for West Ham United on 23 June 2009. Although a work permit had been granted a couple of weeks before, the deal was only announced after personal terms were agreed. West Ham signed Jiménez on a one-year loan initially, with an option to purchase at the end of the loan period. He made his full debut for West Ham in their 2–0 away win against Wolves on 15 August 2009. He scored his only goal for West Ham, a penalty and West Ham's fifth, in a 5–3 home win against Burnley on 28 November 2009.

==== Parma ====
On 1 February 2010, Parma signed the Chilean attacking midfielder on loan from Inter Milan until June, his previous loan with West Ham United having ended prematurely. He signed as part of the deal which saw McDonald Mariga move to Inter Milan. Jiménez has been sent off three times since signing for Parma. At the end of the season, Parma wanted to sign him outright, but the deal fell through after Ternana bought back Jiménez.

=== Ternana ===
On 26 June 2010, after Inter failed to agree a price with Ternana for the remain 50% registration rights, the rights went to auction and Ternana won, for €3.177 million. made Inter profited €5.277 million in accounting (amortization approach). It is because Inter had over-amortized Jiménez's transfer fee (Inter amortized €8.4 million but only cost Inter €6.3 million only, €2.1M exceed) and €3.177 million. (Inter presented the profit as €2.154 million (market price €3.177 × 2 – contract residual value €4.2M) + €3.123 million financial income (value of Inter unpaid half €6.3 million – actual value €3.177M) ) Since Ternana would play at 2010–11 Lega Pro Prima Divisione, he did not attend the training of Ternana and Ternana sought a new buyer to sign him.

==== Cesena ====
On 31 August 2010 he was loaned to newly promoted Serie A team Cesena for €1 million with the option to buy, and was in the starting lineup after the poor form of the original starting lineup. The coach put Ezequiel Schelotto on the bench and Jiménez became the new second striker in the 4–3–3 formation, partnered with central forward Erjon Bogdani and wing forward Emanuele Giaccherini.

=== Al-Ahli Dubai ===
On 29 June 2011, Al-Ahli announced that Jiménez had joined the club on a four-year contract. He had a successful first season, scoring 13 goals and featuring in most of the games. In the 2012–2013 season, he won the President's Cup with Al Ahli.

=== Magallanes ===
In May 2022, while playing for Palestino, it was announced that Jiménez would play his last match as a professional footballer on Sunday 22 against Cobresal at the Estadio Municipal de La Cisterna. The result was a 3–1 win and Jiménez made an assist for the third goal. However, he returned to football after signing with Primera B club Magallanes on July 19.

== International career ==
Jiménez represented Chile U17 at the 2001 South American U-17 Championship and Chile U20 at the 2003 South American U-20 Championship.

At senior level, he made his international debut on 28 April 2004, in a match against Peru. On 4 June 2005, Jiménez assisted Marcelo Salas' historic 35th goal for the national team, which made Salas Chile's top scorer ever. The goal came in a qualifying match against Bolivia which Chile went on to win 3–1. Four days later, he scored twice against Venezuela in another qualification match.

Jiménez became captain of Chile during 2006 and also won the 2005–06 Chile Player of the Year award. However, he saw little national team action under the direction of Marcelo Bielsa. On 19 June 2011, he returned in an international friendly against Estonia and was subsequently included by Claudio Borghi in the squad for the 2011 Copa America. However, he didn't receive any further international call-ups during his time at Al Ahli.

In March 2021, after a ten-year absence, he was recalled by Martín Lasarte for a friendly match against Bolivia, in which he scored his third international goal. At 36 years and 282 days of age, Jiménez became Chile's oldest goalscorer.

== Personal life ==
Jiménez married Chilean model María José "Coté" López in 2006. They have triplets (all girls: Rebeca, Isidora and Rafaela, born on 15 June 2010, ) and a son, Jesús, born 30 April 2016. In addition, Jiménez has a son, Diego, who was born before his marriage to María José. In December 2008, Jiménez assaulted Mauricio Pinilla in a Santiago nightclub.

His daughter Isidora is a young football player in the Magallanes youth ranks and has been called up to train with the Chile youth squad.

The Jiménez family has a close friendship with fellow footballer Carlos Villanueva's family. In addition to the fact that Jiménez played with Villanueva at Al-Ittihad, Jiménez and his wife are the godparents of the Villanueva's son and Villanueva and his wife are the godparents of the Jiménez's children.

In May 2025, Jiménez entered the Chilean reality show Mundos Opuestos 3 (Opposite Worlds).

== Career statistics ==
Scores and results list Chile's goal tally first.

No	Date	Venue	Opponent	Score	Result	Competition
1.	7 June 2005	Estadio Nacional, Santiago, Chile	Venezuela	1–0	2–1	2006 FIFA World Cup qualification
2.	7 June 2005	Estadio Nacional, Santiago, Chile	Venezuela	2–0	2–1	2006 FIFA World Cup qualification
3.	26 March 2021	El Teniente, Rancagua, Chile	Bolivia	1–0	2–1	Friendly

== Honours ==
Inter Milan

- Serie A: 2007–08, 2008–09
- Supercoppa Italiana: 2008

Al Ahli

- Arabian Gulf League: 2013–14
- Arabian Gulf Super Cup: 2013
- UAE President's Cup: 2012–13
- UAE League Cup: 2011–12, 2013–14

Palestino

- Copa Chile: 2018
