= Leonardo Soledispa =

Ecuadorian footballer (born 1983)

Personal information
- Full name: Leonardo Javier Soledispa Cortés
- Date of birth: 15 January 1983 (age 43)
- Place of birth: Guayaquil, Ecuador

International career
Years	Team	Apps	(Gls)
2004–2006	Ecuador	6	(0)

Leonardo Javier Soledispa Cortés (born 15 January 1983) is a former Ecuadorian footballer, playing as a midfielder. He played in six matches for the Ecuador national football team from 2004 to 2006. He was also part of Ecuador's squad for the 2004 Copa América tournament.

== Career ==
Soledispa started his career with Barcelona S.C., first playing for the club in the 2001 season. After the 2007 season, Soledispa left the club due to missing payments and claims of favoritism. The next season, he joined Deportivo Cuenca.
