= Forum for International Conciliation and Arbitration =

- Abbreviation: FICA
- Founded: 1996; 30 years ago
- Founder: Ben Beaumont
- Type: Non-governmental organization
- Legal status: Forum
- Purpose: Provide trans-national arbitration and dispute resolution services
- Location: London, United Kingdom
- Region served: Worldwide
- Products: Dispute resolution policy
- Affiliations: United Nations Commission on International Trade Law
- Website: fica-disputeresolution.com

The Forum for International Conciliation and Arbitration (FICA) is a non-governmental organisation providing trans-national arbitration, dispute-resolution and dispute-avoidance services, founded by Ben Beaumont.

== History ==
The first operation was initiated by International Trade Centre (ITC) which recommended FICA to work with the Law Association of Zambia to create a new Arbitration Act, enacted in 2002, and train potential arbitrators during 1996/1997 with funding provided by Chemonics and United States Agency for International Development (USAID).

Ben Beaumont was co-opted into the Expert Group of Working Group VI Secured Transactions, assisting with the Draft Legislative Guide to the Model Law of Secured Transactions 2005–07.

In 2002 FICA was invited with Observer status to attend UNCITRAL and was accredited to the WTO in 1999 and ITC in 1998.

== Leadership ==
As of 2021, the honorary presidents were Sir Michael Burton and Professor Anthony Finkelstein. The board of directors were Ben Beaumont, Tim Lemay, Alan Anderson, Jeffrey Chan, Herman Verbist, Matthew Finn, Robert Ashdown and Petra Butler.
