= Hugo Bravo (footballer, born 1972) =

Chilean footballer

Personal information
- Full name: Hugo Agustín Bravo Toro
- Date of birth: 5 February 1972 (age 54)
- Place of birth: Santiago, Chile
- Height: 1.77 m (5 ft 10 in)
- Position: Attacking midfielder

Youth career
- Palestino

Senior career*
Years	Team	Apps	(Gls)
1991–1994	Palestino	64	(13)
1991	→ Everton (loan)	0	(0)
1995–1996	Universidad de Chile	15	(1)
1997	Deportes Temuco	27	(7)
1998	Deportes Iquique	13	(0)
1998	Everton		
1999	Coquimbo Unido	19	(7)
1999	Puebla	0	(0)
2000	Audax Italiano	20	(2)
2001	Unión San Felipe	7	(0)
2002	Coquimbo Unido	10	(2)
2003	Deportes Puerto Montt	20	(4)
2004	Coquimbo Unido	12	(3)
2004	Cobresal	0	(0)
2004	Deportes Copiapó		

International career
1991	Chile U20		
- * Club domestic league appearances and goals

Hugo Agustín Bravo Toro (born 5 February 1972) is a Chilean former footballer who played as an attacking midfielder.

== Club career ==
Born in Santiago, Chile, Bravo is a product of the Palestino youth system and played for them until 1994.

He mainly developed his career at the Chilean top division, playing for Universidad de Chile, Deportes Temuco, Deportes Iquique, Coquimbo Unido, Audax Italiano, Unión San Felipe, Deportes Puerto Montt and Cobresal.

As a member of Universidad de Chile, he won the 1995 Chilean Primera División, scoring one goal in the season.

In the Chilean second division, he played for Everton and Deportes Copiapó.

He also had a brief stint in Mexico with Puebla.

He retired at the end of the 2004 season.

== International career ==
Bravo represented Chile U20 in the 1991 South American Championship in Venezuela.

== Personal life ==
From his maternal line, Bravo is the half-brother of the former professional footballers Jorge Valdivia, a Chile international, and Claudio Valdivia as well as the grandson of Juan Toro, another Chile international, who reared him. His half-brother Luis Valdivia, or Quique as he is known, also was with the Palestino youth ranks.

== Post-retirement ==
Bravo went on playing football at amateur level for clubs such as Caupolicán from Huelquén, also winning titles with them.

He had a metal buying and selling business.
