= Fernando Fica =

Chilean footballer (born 1983)

Personal information
- Full name: Fernando Alberto Fica Ortega
- Date of birth: 4 June 1983 (age 43)
- Place of birth: Santiago, Chile
- Height: 1.79 m (5 ft 10 in)
- Position: Midfielder

Youth career
- 1993–2003: Colo-Colo

Senior career*
Years	Team	Apps	(Gls)
2003–2005	Colo-Colo	16	(0)
2006	Instituto Nacional	13	(1)
2007	Provincial Osorno	21	(3)
2008	Deportes Antofagasta	8	(0)
2009–2010	Deportes Iquique	10	(0)
2011–2012	Magallanes	13	(0)
- * Club domestic league appearances and goals as of 1 June 2014

Fernando Alberto Fica Ortega (Spanish pronunciation: [feɾˈnando ˈfika]; born 21 April 1983) is a Chilean footballer who last played for Magallanes.

He played as central midfielder during his active years.

== Honours ==
=== Club ===
Provincial Osorno

- Primera B (1): 2007

Deportes Iquique

- Copa Chile: 2010
- Primera B: 2010
