= Erwin Ávalos =

Paraguayan footballer (born 1983)

Personal information
- Full name: Erwin Lorenzo Ávalos
- Date of birth: 27 April 1983 (age 43)
- Place of birth: Caazapá, Paraguay
- Height: 1.81 m (5 ft 11 in)
- Position: Striker

Team information
- Current team: Sol de América

Senior career*
Years	Team	Apps	(Gls)
2001–2006	Cerro Porteño	133	(48)
2005	Santos	17	(1)
2007	Toluca	15	(0)
2007–2008	→ Racing Club (loan)	15	(4)
2008–2009	Cerro Porteño	33	(10)
2010	Chacarita Juniors	4	(1)
2010	Cerro Porteño	20	(6)
2011–	Sol de América	3	(0)

International career
2001–2003	Paraguay U20	3	(0)
2004	Paraguay U23		
	Paraguay	1	(0)
- * Club domestic league appearances and goals as of 17 April 2010

Erwin Lorenzo Ávalos (born 27 April 1983 in Caazapá) is a Paraguayan football striker currently playing for Sol de América.

Ávalos made his professional debut in 2001 for Cerro Porteño in Paraguay where he was part of two championship winning campaigns in 2001 and 2004. He also was the Paraguayan 1st Division topscorer in 2003.

In 2005 Ávalos spent some time on loan in Santos in Brazil before returning to Cerro.

In 2006 Ávalos joined Club Toluca in Mexico and joined Racing Club in 2007.

Avalos returned to Cerro once again in 2008 and in January 2010 he joined Argentine club Chacarita Juniors.

He returned to Paraguay within six months and then re-joined Cerro Porteño.

Prior to begin 2011 season he moved to Sol de América.

== Titles ==
Season	Team	Title
2001	Cerro Porteño	Liga Paraguaya: Primera División
2004	Cerro Porteño	Liga Paraguaya: Primera División
2009	Cerro Porteño	Apertura
