= Emanuel Rivas =

Argentine footballer (born in 1983)

Personal information
- Full name: Emanuel Benito Rivas
- Date of birth: March 17, 1983 (age 43)
- Place of birth: Quilmes, Argentina
- Height: 1.77 m (5 ft 9 1/2 in)
- Position: Midfielder

Senior career*
Years	Team	Apps	(Gls)
2001–2004	Independiente	47	(4)
2004–2005	Arsenal de Sarandí	17	(0)
2005–2006	Vitória SC	5	(0)
2006–2007	→ Iraklis (on loan)	23	(2)
2007–2008	Talleres de Córdoba	11	(0)
2008	→ Arezzo (on loan)	12	(2)
2008–2012	Bari	75	(6)
2012	Varese	11	(1)
2012–2013	Verona	25	(2)
2013–2014	Spezia	16	(0)
2014–2015	Varese	9	(0)
2015–	Livorno	2	(0)
- * Club domestic league appearances and goals

Emanuel Benito Rivas (born March 17, 1983, in Quilmes) is an Argentine former football midfielder who last played for the Italian club Livorno.

== Career ==
=== From Independiente to Vitória SC ===
Rivas started his career in 1999 with Independiente in the Primera Division Argentina. He was part of the Independiente squad that won the Apertura 2002 championship, ending a 7-year drought without a single title.

In 2004, he moved to Avellaneda's 3rd club; Arsenal de Sarandí but after only one season with Arsenal he was signed by Vitória SC of Portugal.

=== From Arezzo to Varese ===
After six months with Serie C1 club Arezzo, he was noted by then-Serie B club Bari who signed him in June 2008. He also played regularly in the club's comeback season to Serie A in 2009–10.

On 30 January 2012, he played for Varese.

== Honours ==
Season	Club	Title
Apertura 2002	Club Atlético Independiente	Primera Division Argentina
