= Marcelo Guerrero =

Uruguayan footballer (born 1983)

Personal information
- Full name: Marcelo Fernando Guerrero Gorriarán
- Date of birth: January 20, 1983 (age 43)
- Place of birth: Montevideo, Uruguay
- Height: 1.74 m (5 ft 9 in)
- Position: Forward

Senior career*
Years	Team	Apps	(Gls)
2002	Villa Española		
2003–2004	Nacional		
2004–2005	Racing Club	24	(7)
2005–2008	Real San Luis	82	(7)
2009	Colón de Santa Fe	4	(0)
2009–2010	Defensor Sporting	10	(4)
2010–2011	Defensa y Justicia	24	(1)
2011–2012	Unión Temuco	14	(1)
2012	Cerrito	14	(3)
2012–2013	Comunicaciones	61	(10)
2014	Cerrito	9	(1)
2015	Central Español	13	(1)
- * Club domestic league appearances and goals as of 00:11, 18 February 2020 (UTC)

Marcelo Fernando Guerrero (born 20 January 1983 in Montevideo) is a Uruguayan football forward.

== Career ==
Guerrero began his playing career in 2002 with Villa Española in 2003 he joined Nacional. Guerrero had his first experience of Argentine football in 2004 when he joined Racing Club de Avellaneda, after 7 goals in 24 games with Racing he joined Mexican side Real San Luis where he played until 2008. In 2009, he returned to Argentina to sign for Colón de Santa Fe but returned to Uruguay after making only 4 league appearances for the Santa Fe club.
