= Guillermo Rodríguez (footballer) =

Uruguayan footballer (born 1984)

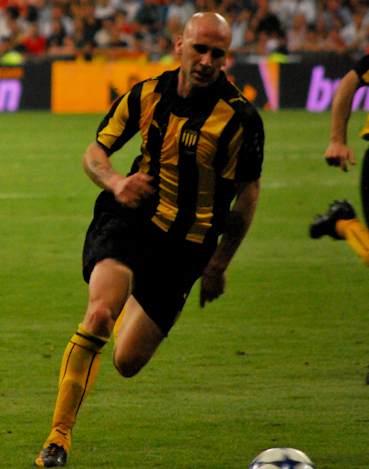
- Rodríguez in 2010

Personal information
- Full name: Guillermo Daniel Rodríguez Pérez
- Date of birth: 21 March 1984 (age 42)
- Place of birth: Montevideo, Uruguay
- Height: 1.85 m (6 ft 1 in)
- Position: Centre-back

Youth career
- 2000–2002: Danubio

Senior career*
Years	Team	Apps	(Gls)
2002–2006	Danubio	40	(2)
2004–2005	→ Atlas (loan)	29	(4)
2006	→ Lens (loan)	2	(0)
2006–2009	Independiente	91	(3)
2009–2011	Peñarol	46	(2)
2011–2012	Cesena	28	(0)
2012–2014	Torino	28	(0)
2014–2015	Hellas Verona	7	(0)
2015–2016	Peñarol	18	(1)
2017–2018	Chiapas	0	(0)
2018	Cerro	7	(0)
2019	Universitario	9	(0)
2020–2022	Sud América	52	(0)
Total		357	(12)

International career
2003	Uruguay U20	2	(2)
2004–2005	Uruguay	12	(0)
- * Club domestic league appearances and goals

Guillermo Daniel Rodríguez Pérez (born 21 March 1984) is a Uruguayan former professional footballer who played as a centre-back.

He is nicknamed El Pelado (in Italian il Pelato).

== Club career ==
=== Early career ===
Rodríguez began his playing career in 2002 with Danubio. After loan spells to Atlas of Mexico and Lens of France he joined Argentine side Independiente in 2006. In 2009, he returned to Uruguay to join Peñarol.

=== Torino ===
After considering a return to Uruguay on 4 August 2012, he was purchased on a temporary basis by Torino, with whom he signed a contract for one year with an option for two more. He made his debut granata 21 October 2012 in Palermo, disputing a good game; that ended 0–0. On 26 June 2013 he was officially purchased outright from Peñarol, with a two-year contract.

=== Verona ===
On 28 July 2014 he was transferred to Verona.
