= Wendel (footballer, born 1984) =

Brazilian footballer

Personal information
- Full name: Wendel Raul Gonçalves Gomes
- Date of birth: May 25, 1984 (age 42)
- Place of birth: São Paulo, Brazil
- Height: 1.83 m (6 ft 0 in)
- Position: Defensive midfielder

Youth career
- 2001–2003: Corinthians

Senior career*
Years	Team	Apps	(Gls)
2003–2007	Corinthians	77	(2)
2006–2007	→ Fortaleza (Loan)	16	(1)
2007	→ Ituano (Loan)	0	(0)
2007–2010	LASK	24	(4)
2010–2011	Santo André	23	(1)
2011	Universitatea Craiova	3	(0)
2011–2012	Mirassol	10	(0)
2012–2013	Guaratinguetá	25	(3)
2014	Boa Esporte	2	(0)
2015	Rio Branco SC	0	(0)
2016	Uberlândia	0	(0)
Total		180	(11)
- * Club domestic league appearances and goals

Wendel Raul Gonçalves Gomes or simply Wendel (born May 25, 1984) is a Brazilian former professional footballer who played as a defensive midfielder.

== Career ==
=== Corinthians ===
Wendel started his career at Corinthians in São Paulo, with which in 2005 he won the Brazilian championship.

In 2006, he was sent to Fortaleza EC. Wendel returned to the Corithians in 2007, but after two games went to FC Ituano. In the summer of 2007, he moved to the LASK. In March and April 2008 he suffered knee injuries, the first of which healed after 11 days, but the second injury required almost two months to heal. In his first season in LASK Wendel played 24 games and scored 4 goals. In July 2008 he once again suffered a knee injury. As of 2010 Wendel played for Santo André Brazil.

=== "U" Craiova ===
In February 2011, Wendel signed a contract with the Romanian club FC Universitatea Craiova of Liga I.

== Honours ==
Corinthians

- Série A: 2005
