= 2002 Campeonato Nacional Primera División =

Primera División
- Season: 2002
- Champions: Apertura: Universidad Católica (8th title); Clausura: Colo-Colo (23rd title)
- Relegated: Concepción; Santiago Morning
- 2003 Copa Libertadores: Universidad Católica; Colo-Colo; Cobreloa
- 2002 Copa Sudamericana: Cobreloa; Santiago Wanderers
- Top goalscorer: Apertura: Sebastián González (18 goals); Clausura: Manuel Neira (14 goals)

The 2002 Primera División season was the 71st season of top-flight football in Chile. It was the second season in which the Apertura and Clausura format was used, and the first since 1997.

== Torneo Apertura ==
=== Classification stage ===
==== Group A ====
Pos	Team	Pld	W	D	L	GF	GA	GD	Pts	Qualification
1	Santiago Wanderers	15	7	4	4	24	20	+4	25	Advanced to the Playoffs
2	Huachipato	15	4	4	7	24	31	−7	16	Advanced to the Playoffs
3	Santiago Morning	15	4	3	8	23	25	−2	15	Advanced to the Playoffs
4	Cobresal	15	3	3	9	19	36	−17	12	

==== Group B ====
Pos	Team	Pld	W	D	L	GF	GA	GD	Pts	Qualification
1	Universidad Católica	15	8	5	2	40	22	+18	29	Advanced to the Playoffs
2	Palestino	15	6	8	1	29	21	+8	26	Advanced to the Playoffs
3	Deportes Temuco	15	6	5	4	33	27	+6	23	Advanced to the Playoffs
4	Audax Italiano	15	6	3	6	18	21	−3	21	

==== Group C ====
Pos	Team	Pld	W	D	L	GF	GA	GD	Pts	Qualification
1	Universidad de Chile	15	7	4	4	28	23	+5	25	Advanced to the Playoffs
2	Rangers	15	6	6	3	21	15	+6	24	Advanced to the Playoffs
3	Cobreloa	15	5	4	6	28	27	+1	19	Advanced to the Playoffs
4	Deportes Concepción	15	4	2	9	18	28	−10	14	

==== Group D ====
Pos	Team	Pld	W	D	L	GF	GA	GD	Pts	Qualification
1	Colo-Colo	15	9	3	3	29	16	+13	30	Advanced to the Playoffs
2	Unión San Felipe	15	5	3	7	21	24	−3	18	Advanced to the Playoffs
3	Coquimbo Unido	15	5	3	7	17	26	−9	18	Advanced to the Playoffs
4	Unión Española	15	4	2	9	17	27	−10	14	

=== Results ===
Home \ Away	AUD	CLO	CSA	COL	DCO	COQ	HUA	PAL	RAN	SMO	USF	DTE	UCA	UCH	UES	SWA
Audax			1–1			2–1	2–1	2–3				2–1	1–2	2–1	1–0	
Cobreloa	2–1		2–0	0–2		4–0	2–0	1–3	3–3	1–1						
Cobresal					1–2	1–1		2–3	3–1			2–4		3–2		0–0
Colo-Colo	3–0		2–0		2–0	4–1	1–1	1–1		2–1	3–1					
Concepción	0–1	1–1							1–0			1–2	1–2	2–2	1–0	0–3
Coquimbo					2–3			0–0	2–2			3–0		0–2	1–0	3–0
Huachipato			3–1		3–1	3–1		2–2	1–1			2–3				0–3
Palestino					4–3				0–0			2–2	2–4	1–1	4–0	1–0
Rangers	0–0	3–1		2–0						2–1		2–2	3–1	2–0	2–0	
S. Morning	2–0		1–2		2–1	0–1	5–2	1–1			0–1					0–1
San Felipe	2–2		4–1		3–1	0–1	0–1	2–2	2–0							3–0
Temuco		3–1		1–1						4–2	5–0		3–3	1–3	0–0	
U. Católica		3–3	7–0	3–1		5–0	2–2			2–3	2–1					
U. Chile		4–2		0–3			3–2			2–1	2–0		1–1		2–0	
U. Española		3–2	3–2	2–3			4–1			1–1	3–1		0–2			
S. Wanderers	2–1	0–3		3–1					1–1			3–2	1–1	3–3	4–1	

Legend: Blue = home team win; Yellow = draw; Red = away team win.

=== Playoff stage ===
In the first round, if teams were level on points at the end of the regulation time in the second leg, the game was continued into extra time with golden goal in effect. If no team scored at the end of extra time, a penalty shootout determined the winner. In the subsequent playoff rounds, away goals was implemented if teams were level after the second leg. Deportes Temuco and Santiago Wanderers advanced as the best losers to the quarterfinals.

First round
U. Católica (a.e.t/g.g.)	0	2 (1)	3
Huachipato	1	0 (0)	1
U. de Chile (a.e.t/g.g.)	1	5 (1)	6
Unión San Felipe	2	1 (0)	1
Rangers (a.e.t/g.g.)	2	1 (1)	4
Deportes Temuco	1	2 (0)	3
Palestino	2	0	2
Coquimbo Unido	0	0	0
Colo-Colo	4	6	10
Santiago Morning	0	2	2
Cobreloa (a.e.t)	2	1 (0)	3 (4)
Santiago Wanderers	1	3 (0)	4 (3)

Quarterfinals
U. Católica	1	2	3
Deportes Temuco	0	2	2
U. de Chile	3	2	5
Santiago Wanderers	3	1	4
Rangers (a)	0	1	1
Palestino	0	1	1
Colo-Colo	5	2	7
Cobreloa	2	2	4

Semifinals
U. Católica	3	2	5
U. de Chile	3	1	4
Rangers	2	2	4
Colo-Colo	1	2	3

Final
U. Católica	1	4	5
Rangers	1	0	1

Note GG: Results in parentheses in the 2nd leg indicate the team that scored in extra time. Penalty shootout results are indicated in parentheses next to the aggregate score.

==== Finals ====
June 26

Rangers	1–1	Universidad Católica
Risso 90'		Pérez 57'

Estadio Fiscal, Talca
Attendance: 13,000
Referee: Guido Aros

June 30

Universidad Católica	4–0	Rangers
Norambuena 45', 46'; Pérez 62'; Mirosevic 73'

Estadio San Carlos de Apoquindo, Santiago
Attendance: 18,000
Referee: Carlos Chandía

Campeonato Nacional
2002 Apertura champions

8th title

=== Top goalscorers ===
Pos	Player	Team	Goals
1	(Chile) Sebastián González	Colo-Colo	18
2	(Chile) Arturo Norambuena	Universidad Católica	14
2	(Chile) Luis Ignacio Quinteros	Colo-Colo	14
4	(Argentina) Luis Rueda	Universidad de Chile	12
4	(Chile) Juan Quiroga	Deportes Temuco	12

== Liguilla Pre-Copa Sudamericana ==
=== Path A ===
Quarterfinals
Colo-Colo	1
Coquimbo Unido	2
Audax Italiano	0
Santiago Morning	1
Deportes Concepción	2 (5)
U. de Chile	2 (4)
Santiago Wanderers	2
Palestino	1

Semifinals
Coquimbo Unido	2
Santiago Morning	0
Deportes Concepción	0
Santiago Wanderers	1

Final
Coquimbo Unido	1
Santiago Wanderers (a.e.t.)	4

=== Path B ===
Quarterfinals
Universidad Católica (a.e.t.)	4
Unión Española	2
Unión San Felipe	5
Deportes Temuco	0
Cobreloa	3
Cobresal	0
Rangers	3
Huachipato	2

Semifinals
Universidad Católica	1
Unión San Felipe	0
Cobreloa (a.e.t.)	3
Rangers	0

Final
Universidad Católica	2
Cobreloa	3

=== Final round ===
28 August 2002	Coquimbo Unido	1 – 4 (a.e.t.)	Santiago Wanderers	Estadio Francisco Sánchez, Coquimbo
	Olivares 2'		80' Sanhueza; 103', 116' Fernández; 110' Riveros	Attendance: 2,336; Referee: B. Arenas

28 August 2002	Universidad Católica	2 – 3	Cobreloa	San Carlos de Apoquindo, Santiago
	Gabrich 9', 89'		48' Fuentes; 71' Madrid; 88' Dinamarca	Attendance: 5,893; Referee: G. Aros

== Torneo Clausura ==
=== Classification stage ===
==== Group A ====
Pos	Team	Pld	W	D	L	GF	GA	GD	Pts	Qualification
1	Colo-Colo	15	6	5	4	21	15	+6	23	Advanced to the Playoffs
2	Huachipato	15	5	5	5	22	18	+4	20	Advanced to the Playoffs
3	Deportes Concepción	15	3	5	7	20	26	−6	14	Advanced to the Playoffs
4	Deportes Temuco	15	1	5	9	13	32	−19	8	

==== Group B ====
Pos	Team	Pld	W	D	L	GF	GA	GD	Pts	Qualification
1	Cobreloa	15	10	4	1	33	10	+23	34	Advanced to the Playoffs
2	Cobresal	15	7	6	2	23	20	+3	27	Advanced to the Playoffs
3	Universidad Católica	15	7	5	3	28	20	+8	26	Advanced to the Playoffs
4	Audax Italiano	15	4	6	5	19	22	−3	18	

==== Group C ====
Pos	Team	Pld	W	D	L	GF	GA	GD	Pts	Qualification
1	Coquimbo Unido	15	3	8	4	10	12	−2	17	Advanced to the Playoffs
2	Palestino	15	2	6	7	14	23	−9	12	Advanced to the Playoffs
3	Rangers	15	2	5	8	13	28	−15	11	Advanced to the Playoffs
4	Santiago Morning	15	2	4	9	11	26	−15	10	

==== Group D ====
Pos	Team	Pld	W	D	L	GF	GA	GD	Pts	Qualification
1	Universidad de Chile	15	8	6	1	24	12	+12	30	Advanced to the Playoffs
2	Santiago Wanderers	15	7	4	4	23	18	+5	25	Advanced to the Playoffs
3	Unión Española	15	7	3	5	24	17	+7	24	Advanced to the Playoffs
4	Unión San Felipe	15	6	3	6	21	20	+1	21	

=== Results ===
Home \ Away	AUD	CLO	CSA	COL	DCO	COQ	HUA	PAL	RAN	SMO	USF	DTE	UCA	UCH	UES	SWA
Audax		1–2		1–2	2–2				1–1	2–1	2–1					1–1
Cobreloa					1–0				4–0			7–1	3–0	1–1	1–0	2–0
Cobresal	1–0	1–1		2–1			2–2			1–1	3–2		1–3		3–2	
Colo-Colo		1–2							3–1			1–1	1–1	0–0	2–0	0–2
Concepción			1–1	2–4		1–1	1–2	1–1		1–0	0–2					
Coquimbo	0–0	0–0	0–0	0–1			1–0			2–1	2–0		1–1			
Huachipato	1–1	1–1		0–0						3–0	3–0		3–1	1–2	1–3	
Palestino	3–1	1–3	2–0	0–0		0–0	1–1			0–2	0–2					
Rangers			1–2		1–2	1–1	3–0	3–2			1–1					1–1
S. Morning		0–4		1–5					2–0			0–0	1–2	0–2	1–1	
San Felipe		3–1		2–0						1–1		3–2	1–2	1–1	2–1	
Temuco	1–2		1–2		1–2	1–1	0–3	1–1	0–0							0–2
U. Católica	2–3				2–1			2–0	3–0			5–1		1–1	1–1	2–2
U. Chile	2–2		1–1		2–1	1–0		3–1	4–0			1–2				2–1
U. Española	2–0				4–3	3–0		1–1	2–0			2–1		0–1		2–0
S. Wanderers			2–3		2–2	2–1	2–1	3–1		2–0	1–0					

Legend: Blue = home team win; Yellow = draw; Red = away team win.

=== Playoff stage ===
First Round
Teams			Scores		Tie-breakers	
Team #1	Points	Team #2	1st leg	2nd leg	GG	Pen.
Universidad Católica	4:1	Coquimbo Unido	0–0	2–0		
Santiago Wanderers	3:3	Huachipato	0–4	5–0 (aet)	1–0	
Unión Española	1:4	Colo-Colo	2–3	0–0		
Cobreloa	6:0	Rangers	2–1	3–2		
Cobresal	3:3	Deportes Concepción	1–5	4–1 (aet)	1–0	
Universidad de Chile	6:0	Palestino	4–3	4–2		

Quarterfinals
Teams			Scores		Tie-breakers	
Team #1	Points	Team #2	1st leg	2nd leg	AG	Pen.
Santiago Wanderers	0:6	Universidad Católica	0–4	1–2	—	—
Colo-Colo	6:0	Cobresal	4–1	3–1	—	—
Deportes Concepción	0:6	Cobreloa	0–2	1–2	—	—
Huachipato	2:2	Universidad de Chile	2–2	1–1	1:2	—

Semifinals
Teams			Scores		Tie-breakers	
Team #1	Points	Team #2	1st leg	2nd leg	AG	Pen.
Universidad de Chile	1:4	Universidad Católica	0–0	0–1	—	—
Cobreloa	0:6	Colo-Colo	0–2	1–2	—	—

==== Finals ====
December 18

Colo-Colo	2–0	Universidad Católica
Espina 47'; Quinteros 86'

Estadio Monumental, Santiago
Attendance: 40,000
Referee: Guido Aros

December 22

Universidad Católica	2–3	Colo-Colo
Lenci 10'; Acevedo 86'		Espina 15' (pen.); Neira 67', 73'

Estadio Nacional, Santiago
Attendance: 45,540
Referee: Carlos Chandía

Primera Division
2002 Clausura champion

23rd title

=== Top goalscorers ===
Pos	Player	Team	Goals
1	(Chile) Manuel Neira	Colo-Colo	14
2	(Argentina) Sergio Gioino	Huachipato	13
3	(Uruguay) Silvio Fernández	Santiago Wanderers	12

== Pre-Copa Libertadores play-off ==
21 December 2002	Palestino	1 – 2	Cobreloa	Estadio Municipal de La Cisterna, Santiago
	Rubilar 39'		10', 17' Madrid	Attendance: 2,865; Referee: E. Ponce

28 December 2002	Cobreloa	0 – 0	Palestino	Estadio Municipal, Calama
				Attendance: 3,277; Referee: R. Selman

Cobreloa also qualified for the 2003 Copa Libertadores

== Relegation ==
Pos	Team	Pld	W	D	L	GF	GA	GD	Pts	Relegation
1	Universidad Católica	30	15	10	5	68	42	+26	55	
2	Universidad de Chile	30	15	10	5	52	35	+17	55	
3	Cobreloa	30	15	8	7	61	37	+24	53	
4	Colo-Colo	30	15	8	7	50	31	+19	53	
5	Santiago Wanderers	30	14	8	8	47	38	+9	50	
6	Unión San Felipe	30	11	6	13	42	44	−2	39	
7	Audax Italiano	30	10	9	11	37	43	−6	39	
8	Cobresal	30	10	9	11	42	56	−14	39	
9	Palestino	30	8	14	8	43	44	−1	38	
10	Unión Española	30	11	5	14	41	44	−3	38	
11	Huachipato	30	9	9	12	46	49	−3	36	
12	Rangers	30	8	11	11	34	43	−9	35	
13	Coquimbo Unido	30	8	11	11	27	38	−11	35	
14	Temuco	30	7	10	13	46	59	−13	31	
15	Concepción	30	7	7	16	38	54	−16	28	Relegated to the Primera División B
16	Santiago Morning	30	6	7	17	34	51	−17	25	Relegated to the Primera División B

== See also ==
- 2002 in Chilean football
