= Blas López =

Paraguayan footballer (born 1984)

Personal information
- Full name: Blas Ramón López
- Date of birth: 14 May 1984 (age 42)
- Place of birth: Piribebuy, Paraguay
- Height: 1.77 m (5 ft 10 in)
- Position: Midfielder

Youth career
- Cerro Corá

Senior career*
Years	Team	Apps	(Gls)
2000–2001	Cerro Corá		
2002–2004	Libertad	5	(0)
2004	Deportes Puerto Montt	15	(0)
2005	General Caballero	11	(1)
2005	Libertad	10	(1)
2006	3 de Febrero	12	(2)
2006–2007	Nacional Asunción	34	(3)
2007	12 de Octubre	16	(0)
2008	Aucas	8	(0)
2008	Silvio Pettirossi		
2009–2015	Sport Huancayo	188	(27)
2016	River Plate Asunción	17	(0)
2016–2017	Sport Huancayo	45	(3)

International career
- Paraguay U17
- Paraguay U20
- * Club domestic league appearances and goals

Blas Ramón López (born 14 May 1984) is a Paraguayan former professional footballer who played as a midfielder.

== Career ==
López started his career in Cerro Corá of Paraguay, then he was signed by Libertad of Paraguay, he disputed the Copa Libertadores 2004. He has played in Chile, Ecuador and now in Peru.

López has played for Paraguay national teams in the under-17 and under-20 South American Youth Championships, also the 2001 FIFA U-17 World Championship and the 2003 FIFA World Youth Championship.

He spent his last years with Peruvian club Sport Huancayo.
