= Roberto Miña =

Ecuadorian footballer (born 1984)

Roberto Mina
Personal information
- Full name: Roberto Javier Mina Mercado
- Date of birth: November 7, 1984 (age 41)
- Place of birth: Guayaquil, Ecuador
- Height: 6 ft 0 in (1.83 m)
- Position: Striker

Team information
- Current team: Emelec

Youth career
- 1999–03: LDU (Loja)

Senior career*
Years	Team	Apps	(Gls)
2002–2003	Huracán	3	(1)
2003	Emelec	2	(0)
2004	El Nacional	23	(1)
2005–2007	FC Dallas	37	(10)
2008	Belgrano de Cordoba	0	(0)
2009	Deportivo Olmedo	2	(0)
2010	Macará	25	(7)
	Emelec	0	(0)

International career
2002–2007	Ecuador	12	(0)
- * Club domestic league appearances and goals as of 01:32, 13 July 2006 (UTC)

Roberto Javier Mina Mercado (born November 7, 1984) is a retired Ecuadorian soccer striker who played for Emelec in the Serie A de Ecuador.

== Club career ==
Prior joining Belgrano, Mina played for FC Dallas in MLS, Emelec, Deportivo Quevedo, LDU (Loja), and El Nacional in his native Ecuador, as well as for Huracán in Argentina. Mina scored seven league goals for Dallas in his first year in MLS. Mina missed a good portion of the 2006 season with an injury to his knee; as a result, he finished with only 16 appearances (of which nine were starts) and three goals. The following season, Mina's injuries woes continued and he was ruled out for the entire season after straining his knee in a pre-season friendly. Due to these injuries Mina's contract was not extended. In Spring of 2008 he returned to Argentina to join first division club Gimnasia jujuy according to local media, however the suspected move never became reality. At the end of the summer and after a few months without a club Mina joined second division Argentine club Belgrano de Cordoba as a promising attacking option for Belgrano in the current Nacional B promotion Championship.

In December 2010 he was signed once again by Ecuadorian giants Emelec in a 2-year contract.

== International career ==
Mina has appeared for Ecuador national football team on various youth levels, and got his first senior cap during the 2002–03 season. He has appeared in 12 matches for the senior team.
