= Marcelo Espina =

Argentine footballer and manager

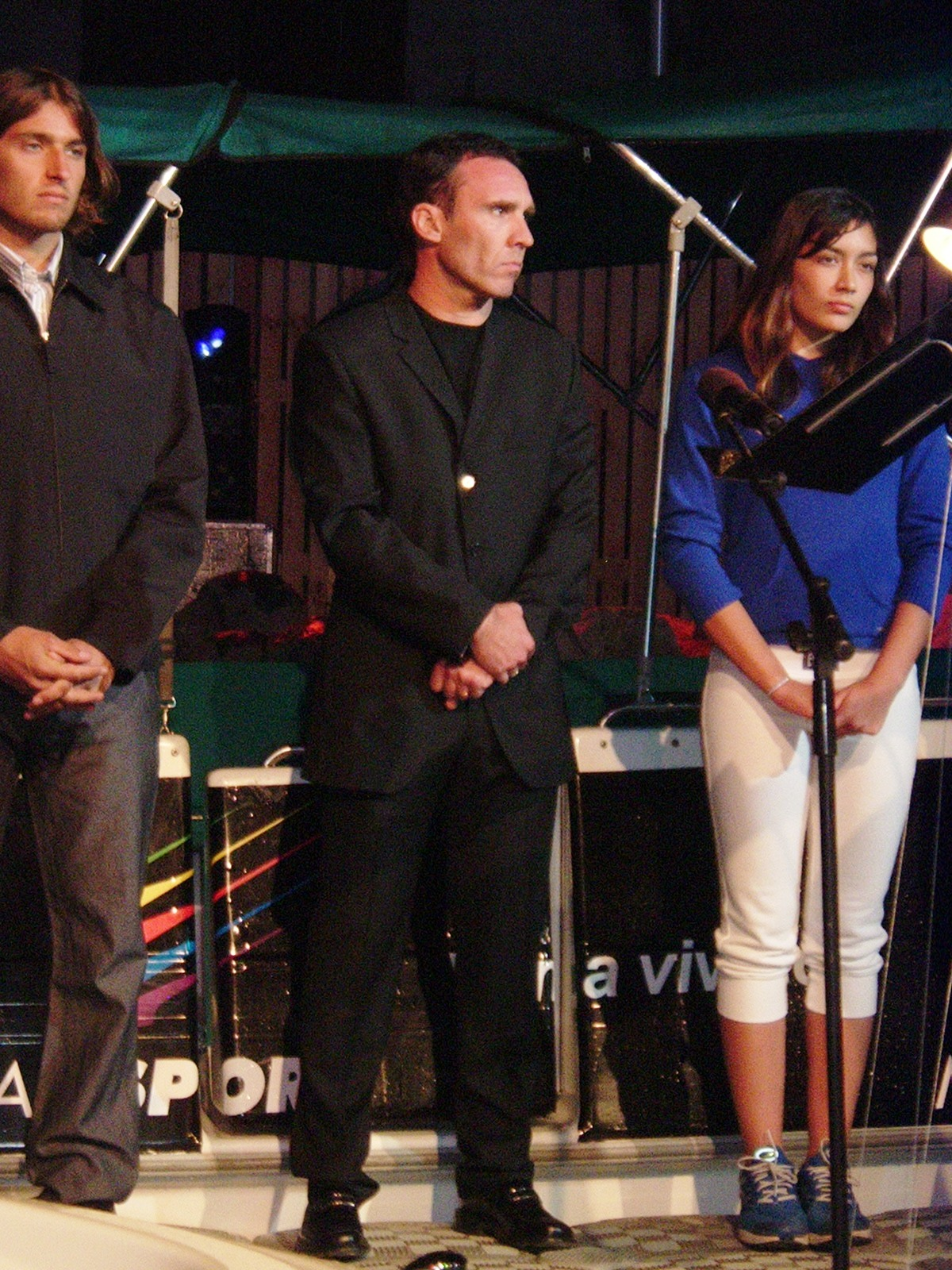

Personal information
- Full name: Marcelo Fabián Espina Barrano
- Date of birth: 28 April 1967 (age 59)
- Place of birth: Capital Federal, Argentina
- Height: 1.74 m (5 ft 9 in)
- Position: Midfielder

Senior career*
Years	Team	Apps	(Gls)
1986–1989	Platense	109	(25)
1990–1991	Irapuato	33	(5)
1991–1992	Atlante	35	(5)
1992–1993	Lanús	16	(1)
1993–1994	Correcaminos	23	(2)
1994–1995	Platense	55	(20)
1995–1998	Colo-Colo	84	(22)
1999–2001	Racing Santander	71	(4)
2001–2004	Colo-Colo	75	(18)

International career
1994–1996	Argentina	15	(1)

Managerial career
- 2005: Colo-Colo
- 2006: Everton
- 2007–2008: Unión Española
- 2010: Platense
- 2011: Acassuso
- 2012: Platense
- * Club domestic league appearances and goals

Marcelo Fabián Espina Barrano (born April 28, 1967) is an Argentine former professional football midfielder who played for a number of clubs in Argentina and Chile and represented the Argentine national team. He is now a match analyst for ESPN South America.

== Club career ==
Born in Buenos Aires, Espina began his career at Platense in the Argentine Primera División in 1986. In 1989, he moved to Mexico where he played for Irapuato and then Atlante F.C. In 1992, he returned to Argentina to play for Lanús, but after only one season he returned to Platense.

In 1995, he joined Colo-Colo in Chile, in his first spell at the club he was part of 3 title winning teams. In 1999, he left Colo-Colo to play for Racing Santander of La Liga in Spain. After 2 seasons with Racing, Espina returned to Colo-Colo where he retired in 2004.

== International career ==
Espina represented the Argentine national team on 15 occasions between 1994 and 1996 scoring 1 goal. He also captained national team in 1995. He is best remembered for being the first player after Diego Maradona's retirement from the National Team to wear the #10 shirt, during the tenure of coach Daniel Passarella.

== Managerial career ==
After retiring as a player he had spells as manager of Colo-Colo and Everton in Chile. In 2010, he joined Platense of the regionalised 3rd division of Argentine football.

== Personal life ==
Espina naturalized Chilean by residence.

His father, Marcelino "Cacho" Espina, died in August 2024, worked as a scout for Platense and Colo-Colo. His son, Santiago, was born in Chile and played football at professional level for Platense, San Lorenzo and Deportes Copiapó.

Marcelo has worked as a football commentator and analyst for ESPN Chile.

== Honours ==
Colo-Colo

- Chilean Primera División: 1996, 1997–C, 1998, 2002–C
- Copa Chile: 1996

Individual

- Argentine Primera División top scorer: 1994 Clausura
