= 2001 FIFA U-17 World Championship squads =

== Group A ==
=== Trinidad and Tobago ===
Head coach: (Brazil) Renê Simões

No.	Pos.	Player	Date of birth (age)	Caps	Club
1	GK	Marvin Phillip	1 August 1984 (aged 17)		(Trinidad and Tobago) Presentation College
2	DF	Julius James	9 July 1984 (aged 17)		(Trinidad and Tobago) St Anthony's College
3	DF	Lee Haynes	4 September 1984 (aged 17)		(Trinidad and Tobago) St Benedict's College
4	DF	Devon Bristol	10 January 1984 (aged 17)		(Trinidad and Tobago) Carapichaima Secondary
5	MF	Terrence McAllister	11 May 1984 (aged 17)		(Trinidad and Tobago) El Dorado Senior
6	FW	Kenwyne Jones	5 October 1984 (aged 16)		(Trinidad and Tobago) St Anthony's College
7	FW	Jerol Forbes	22 December 1984 (aged 16)		(Trinidad and Tobago) Naparima College
8	MF	Roderick Anthony	30 April 1984 (aged 17)		(Trinidad and Tobago) Naparima College
9	MF	Cyrone Edwards	18 June 1984 (aged 17)		(Trinidad and Tobago) Trinity College
10	MF	Devon Leacock	24 November 1984 (aged 16)		(Trinidad and Tobago) St Benedict's College
11	MF	Kerron Phillips	29 May 1984 (aged 17)		(Trinidad and Tobago) Arrima Senior
12	MF	Jamal Hamid	24 August 1984 (aged 17)		(Trinidad and Tobago) Arrima Senior
13	DF	Khalil Mathura	18 January 1984 (aged 17)		(Trinidad and Tobago) St Mary's College
14	FW	André Alexis	31 July 1984 (aged 17)		(Trinidad and Tobago) St Benedict's College
15	FW	Nkosi Blackman	8 April 1984 (aged 17)		(Trinidad and Tobago) St Benedict's College
16	MF	Ochieng Abosi	1 June 1984 (aged 17)		(Trinidad and Tobago) El Dorado Senior
17	DF	Makan Hislop	3 September 1985 (aged 16)		(Trinidad and Tobago) Signal Hill Senior
18	GK	Jan-Michael Williams	26 October 1984 (aged 16)		(Trinidad and Tobago) St Anthony's College

=== Croatia ===
Head coach: (Croatia) Martin Novoselac

No.	Pos.	Player	Date of birth (age)	Caps	Club
1	GK	Dario Krešić	11 January 1984 (aged 17)		(Germany) VfB Stuttgart
2	MF	Drago Papa	9 February 1984 (aged 17)		(Croatia) Dinamo Zagreb
3	DF	Hrvoje Čale	4 March 1985 (aged 16)		(Croatia) Dinamo Zagreb
4	DF	Domagoj Skeja	15 April 1984 (aged 17)		(Croatia) NK Zagreb
5	DF	Silvio Cavrić	10 July 1985 (aged 16)		(Croatia) Istra
6	DF	Marko Bašić	13 September 1984 (aged 17)		(Croatia) Dinamo Zagreb
7	MF	Dejan Prijić	2 January 1984 (aged 17)		(Croatia) Osijek
8	MF	Mario Grgurović	2 February 1985 (aged 16)		(Croatia) Hajduk Split
9	FW	Igor Ružak	15 January 1984 (aged 17)		(Croatia) Osijek
10	MF	Niko Kranjčar	13 August 1984 (aged 17)		(Croatia) Dinamo Zagreb
11	FW	Ivan Grivičić	22 June 1984 (aged 17)		(Croatia) Hajduk Split
12	DF	Igor Lozo	2 March 1984 (aged 17)		(Croatia) Hajduk Split
13	FW	Ahmad Sharbini	21 February 1984 (aged 17)		(Croatia) Rijeka
14	FW	Tomislav Lukašek	16 March 1984 (aged 17)		(Croatia) Osijek
15	FW	Leonardo Barnjak	31 January 1984 (aged 17)		(Croatia) Dinamo Zagreb
16	MF	Kruno Jambrušić	7 February 1984 (aged 17)		(Croatia) Slaven Belupo
17	DF	Asmir Oraščanin	28 June 1984 (aged 17)		(Croatia) Dinamo Zagreb
18	GK	Denis Pintarić	25 September 1984 (aged 16)		(Croatia) Osijek

=== Australia ===
Head coach: (Australia) Ange Postecoglou

No.	Pos.	Player	Date of birth (age)	Caps	Club
1	GK	Nathan Coe	1 June 1984 (aged 17)		(Australia) AIS
2	DF	Alex Wilkinson	13 August 1984 (aged 17)		(Australia) Northern Spirit
3	DF	Matthew Hunter	29 April 1984 (aged 17)		(Australia) Northern Spirit
4	DF	Pedj Bojic	9 April 1984 (aged 17)		(Australia) Parramatta Power
5	DF	Spase Dilevski	13 May 1985 (aged 16)		(Australia) Victorian Institute of Sport
6	MF	Adam van Dommele	5 September 1984 (aged 17)		(Australia) South Australian Sports Institute
7	DF	Brett Studman	19 April 1985 (aged 16)		(Australia) AIS
8	DF	Darren Broxton	15 January 1984 (aged 17)		(England) Southampton
9	MF	Carl Valeri	14 August 1984 (aged 17)		(Australia) AIS
10	MF	Anthony Danze	15 March 1984 (aged 17)		(Australia) Perth Glory
11	MF	Fred Agius	2 February 1984 (aged 17)		(Australia) Playford City
12	FW	Ben Stevens	13 January 1984 (aged 17)		(Australia) QAS
13	FW	Sean Walsh	14 February 1984 (aged 17)		(Australia) AIS
14	FW	Brett Holman	27 March 1984 (aged 17)		(Australia) Parramatta Power
15	FW	Jay Lucas	14 January 1985 (aged 16)		(England) Southampton
16	FW	Matthew Engele	22 April 1984 (aged 17)		(Australia) AIS
17	FW	Terry Smith	9 August 1984 (aged 17)		(Australia) AIS
18	GK	Jacob Rex	4 October 1984 (aged 16)		(Australia) Northern Spirit

=== Brazil ===
Head coach: (Brazil) Sérgio Farias

No.	Pos.	Player	Date of birth (age)	Caps	Club
1	GK	Felipe	22 February 1984 (aged 17)		(Brazil) Vitória
2	DF	Vinícius	21 November 1984 (aged 16)		(Brazil) Palmeiras
3	DF	Wendel	25 May 1984 (aged 17)		(Brazil) Corinthians
4	DF	Wescley	15 February 1984 (aged 17)		(Brazil) Vasco da Gama
5	MF	Alceu	7 May 1984 (aged 17)		(Brazil) Palmeiras
6	MF	Fernandes	5 June 1984 (aged 17)		(Brazil) Botafogo
7	FW	Caetano	20 May 1984 (aged 17)		(Brazil) São Paulo
8	MF	Leandro Bonfim	8 January 1984 (aged 17)		(Brazil) Vitória
9	FW	Bruno	7 July 1984 (aged 17)		(Brazil) Santos
10	MF	Diego	28 February 1985 (aged 16)		(Brazil) Santos
11	MF	Francisco Alberoni	16 May 1984 (aged 17)		(Brazil) Vasco da Gama
12	DF	Thiago Junio	3 April 1984 (aged 17)		(Brazil) Atlético Mineiro
13	MF	Marcelo Mattos	10 February 1984 (aged 17)		(Brazil) Mirassol
14	MF	Rodolfo	20 May 1985 (aged 16)		(Brazil) Fluminense
15	MF	Júnior Carioca	27 April 1985 (aged 16)		(Brazil) Flamengo
16	FW	Anderson	13 March 1984 (aged 17)		(Brazil) Vasco da Gama
17	FW	Malzoni	5 January 1984 (aged 17)		(Brazil) Coritiba
18	GK	Marcelo	2 March 1984 (aged 17)		(Brazil) Corinthians

== Group B ==
=== United States ===
Head coach: (United States) John Ellinger

No.	Pos.	Player	Date of birth (age)	Caps	Club
1	GK	Ford Williams	20 February 1984 (aged 17)		(United States) CASL Elite
2	DF	David Chun	30 March 1984 (aged 17)		(United States) Irvine Strikers
3	MF	Justin Mapp	18 October 1984 (aged 16)		(United States) Jackson FC
4	FW	Paul Johnson	22 January 1984 (aged 17)		(United States) SSC Dalglish
5	DF	Tyson Wahl	23 February 1984 (aged 17)		(United States) Irvine Strikers
6	DF	Chris Lancos	12 July 1984 (aged 17)		(United States) Middletown North
7	FW	Mike Magee	2 September 1984 (aged 17)		(United States) Chicago Sockers
8	DF	Jordan Harvey	28 January 1984 (aged 17)		(United States) Irvine Strikers
9	FW	Santino Quaranta	14 October 1984 (aged 16)		(United States) D.C. United
10	FW	Eddie Johnson	31 March 1984 (aged 17)		(United States) Dallas Burn
11	MF	Chefik Simo	28 February 1984 (aged 17)		(United States) Solar SC
12	DF	Gray Griffin	2 January 1984 (aged 17)		(United States) Charlotte SC
13	MF	David Johnson	16 January 1984 (aged 17)		(United States) AGSS
14	DF	Chad Marshall	22 August 1984 (aged 17)		(United States) Irvine Strikers
15	MF	Jordan Stone	16 March 1984 (aged 17)		(United States) Dallas Texans
16	MF	Craig Capano	7 July 1985 (aged 16)		(United States) Chicago Sockers
17	FW	Erwin Díaz	11 July 1984 (aged 17)		(United States) Bethesda Alliance
18	GK	Adam Schuerman	4 June 1984 (aged 17)		(United States) Elmbrook United

=== Japan ===
Head coach: (Japan) Kozo Tashima

No.	Pos.	Player	Date of birth (age)	Caps	Club
1	GK	Kenta Tokushige	9 March 1984 (aged 17)		(Japan) Kunimi High School
2	DF	Ryota Aoki	19 August 1984 (aged 17)		(Japan) Ichiritsu Funabashi High School
3	DF	Kentaro Oi	14 May 1984 (aged 17)		(Japan) Fujieda Higashi High School
4	MF	Masatomo Kuba	21 November 1984 (aged 16)		(Japan) Tokyo Verdy
5	DF	Tadayo Fukuo	6 May 1984 (aged 17)		(Japan) Cerezo Osaka
6	MF	Shingo Nejime	22 December 1984 (aged 16)		(Japan) Tokyo Verdy
7	MF	Naoya Kikuchi	24 November 1984 (aged 16)		(Japan) Shimizu Shogyo High School
8	MF	Sho Naruoka	31 May 1984 (aged 17)		(Japan) Fujieda Higashi High School
9	FW	Hiroto Mogi	2 March 1984 (aged 17)		(Japan) Seiko Gakuin High School
10	MF	Kohei Kudo	28 August 1984 (aged 17)		(Japan) JEF United Chiba
11	FW	Yutaro Abe	5 October 1984 (aged 16)		(Japan) Toin Gakuen High School
12	DF	Hisanori Ogawa	22 May 1984 (aged 17)		(Japan) Avispa Fukuoka
13	FW	Sho Kitano	20 November 1984 (aged 16)		(Japan) Yokohama F. Marinos
14	MF	Kiyohiro Hirabayashi	4 June 1984 (aged 17)		(Japan) Nagoya Grampus Eight
15	FW	Kisho Yano	5 April 1984 (aged 17)		(Japan) Hamana High School
16	MF	Jungo Fujimoto	24 March 1984 (aged 17)		(Japan) Toko Gakuen High School
17	DF	Junichi Takayama	18 August 1984 (aged 17)		(Japan) Kashima Antlers
18	GK	Atsushi Kimura	1 May 1984 (aged 17)		(Japan) Gamba Osaka
19	MF	Kota Sugiyama	24 January 1985 (aged 16)		(Japan) Shimizu S-Pulse
20	MF	Tomoya Osawa	22 October 1985 (aged 15)		(Japan) Omiya Ardija

=== France ===
Head coach: (France) Jean-François Jodar

No.	Pos.	Player	Date of birth (age)	Caps	Club
1	GK	Florent Chaigneau	21 March 1984 (aged 17)		(France) Rennes
2	DF	Kévin Debris	10 May 1984 (aged 17)		(France) Le Havre
3	DF	Jérémy Berthod	24 April 1984 (aged 17)		(France) Lyon
4	DF	Julio Colombo	22 February 1984 (aged 17)		(France) Montpellier
5	DF	Jacques Faty	25 February 1984 (aged 17)		(France) Rennes
6	MF	Gaël Maïa	2 January 1984 (aged 17)		(France) Bordeaux
7	FW	Anthony Le Tallec	3 October 1984 (aged 16)		(France) Le Havre
8	MF	Hassan Yebda	14 May 1984 (aged 17)		(France) Auxerre
9	FW	Florent Sinama Pongolle	20 October 1984 (aged 16)		(France) Le Havre
10	MF	Mourad Meghni	16 April 1984 (aged 17)		(Italy) Bologna
11	FW	Chaouki Ben Saada	1 July 1984 (aged 17)		(France) Bastia
12	MF	Emerse Faé	24 January 1984 (aged 17)		(France) Nantes
13	DF	Stéphen Drouin	27 January 1984 (aged 17)		(France) Nantes
14	DF	Laurent Mohellebi	5 January 1984 (aged 17)		(France) Monaco
15	FW	Kévin Jacmot	22 March 1984 (aged 17)		(France) Lyon
16	MF	Samuel Piètre	10 February 1984 (aged 17)		(France) Paris Saint-Germain
17	FW	Luigi Glombard	21 August 1984 (aged 17)		(France) Nantes
18	GK	Michaël Fabre	15 July 1984 (aged 17)		(Italy) Bologna

=== Nigeria ===
Head coach: (Nigeria) Abdullahi Musa

No.	Pos.	Player	Date of birth (age)	Caps	Club
1	GK	Osaze Uweluyi	10 September 1984 (aged 17)		(Nigeria) Igbino Babes
2	DF	Kennedy Chinwo	29 December 1985 (aged 15)		(Nigeria) Michelin
3	DF	Ndala Ibrahim	2 May 1985 (aged 16)		(Nigeria) Wikki Tourists
4	DF	Emmanuel Baba	22 May 1985 (aged 16)		(Nigeria) Jigawa Golden Stars
5	MF	Joseph Eyimofe	22 September 1984 (aged 16)		Nigeria Port Authority
6	MF	Richard Eromoigbe	20 June 1984 (aged 17)		Nigeria Port Authority
7	FW	Karimu Shaibu	10 December 1984 (aged 16)		(Nigeria) Bendel Insurance
8	FW	Austine Nnamdi	27 August 1985 (aged 16)		Nigeria Port Authority
9	FW	Moses Ayuba	3 May 1985 (aged 16)		(Nigeria) Alausa Kaduna
10	FW	Victor Brown	30 March 1984 (aged 17)		(Nigeria) Jasper United
11	MF	Femi Opabunmi	3 March 1985 (aged 16)		(Nigeria) Shooting Stars
12	DF	Ifeanyi Ugo	16 February 1984 (aged 17)		(Nigeria) Relaxers
13	DF	Soga Sambo	5 October 1985 (aged 15)		(Nigeria) Pepsi Football Academy
14	MF	Kazeem Babatunde	1 January 1984 (aged 17)		(Nigeria) Julius Berger
15	DF	Cyril Gona	25 September 1984 (aged 16)		(Nigeria) Plateau United
16	MF	Omonigho Temile	16 July 1984 (aged 17)		(Nigeria) Delta United
17	DF	Suleiman Mohammed	12 January 1984 (aged 17)		(Nigeria) Nasawara United
18	GK	Bassey Akpan	6 January 1984 (aged 17)		(Nigeria) Bayelsa United F.C.

== Group C ==
=== Oman ===
Head Coach: (New Zealand) John Adshead

No.	Pos.	Player	Date of birth (age)	Caps	Club
1	GK	Ali Al-Ajmi	14 November 1984 (aged 16)		(Oman) Sohar
2	DF	Muaz Mohammed Al Alawi	23 December 1984 (aged 16)		(Oman) Al-Talia
3	DF	Sami Al-Saadi	16 January 1985 (aged 16)		(Oman) Al-Suwaiq
4	DF	Haifar Al-Bulushi	1 March 1984 (aged 17)		Oman FC
5	FW	Ismail Al-Ajmi	9 June 1984 (aged 17)		(Oman) Khaboura
6	MF	Mohammed Al-Hinai	19 July 1984 (aged 17)		Oman FC
7	DF	Khalid Al-Shikairi	29 October 1984 (aged 16)		Oman FC
8	MF	Hafidh Al-Ibrahim	26 October 1984 (aged 16)		(Oman) Al-Hilal
9	FW	Hassan Zaher	7 January 1985 (aged 16)		(Oman) Al-Nasr
10	MF	Ahmed Hadid	18 July 1984 (aged 17)		(Oman) Al-Talia
11	DF	Sulaiman Al-Shikairi	29 October 1984 (aged 16)		Oman FC
12	GK	Hani Sabti	27 February 1984 (aged 17)		(Oman) Zofar
13	DF	Yasser Al-Araimi	23 February 1985 (aged 16)		(Oman) Al-Oruba
14	MF	Ahmed Al-Marzouq	5 July 1984 (aged 17)		(Oman) Zofar
15	MF	Khalifa Ayil	1 March 1984 (aged 17)		Oman FC
16	MF	Hasan Al-Mukhaini	4 April 1985 (aged 16)		(Oman) Al-Oruba
17	MF	Nabil Al-Bulushi	10 July 1985 (aged 16)		(Oman) Al-Ahli
18	GK	Sulaiman Al-Jadeedi	29 September 1984 (aged 16)		(Oman) Al-Rustaq

=== Spain ===
Head coach: (Spain) Juan Santisteban

No.	Pos.	Player	Date of birth (age)	Caps	Club
1	GK	Jorge Zaparaín	26 April 1984 (aged 17)		(Spain) Zaragoza
2	DF	Jesús	21 April 1984 (aged 17)		(Spain) Real Madrid
3	DF	Javier Tarantino	26 June 1984 (aged 17)		(Spain) Athletic Bilbao
4	DF	Carlos García	29 April 1984 (aged 17)		(Spain) Espanyol
5	DF	Miguel Flaño	19 August 1984 (aged 17)		(Spain) Osasuna
6	MF	Berto	18 February 1984 (aged 17)		(Spain) Racing Santander
7	MF	Guillem Bauzà	25 October 1984 (aged 16)		(Spain) Mallorca
8	MF	Andrés Iniesta	11 May 1984 (aged 17)		(Spain) Barcelona
9	FW	Senel	13 May 1984 (aged 17)		(Spain) Celta Vigo
10	MF	Diego León	16 January 1984 (aged 17)		(Spain) Real Madrid
11	MF	Sergio Torres	2 March 1984 (aged 17)		(Spain) Atlético Madrid
12	DF	Miguel Palencia	2 January 1984 (aged 17)		(Spain) Real Madrid
13	DF	Melli	6 June 1984 (aged 17)		(Spain) Real Betis
14	FW	Fernando Torres	20 March 1984 (aged 17)		(Spain) Atlético Madrid
15	MF	Jaime Gavilán	12 May 1985 (aged 16)		(Spain) Valencia
16	FW	Gorka Larrea	7 April 1984 (aged 17)		(Spain) Real Sociedad
17	FW	Pepe	6 January 1984 (aged 17)		(Spain) Deportivo La Coruña
18	GK	Miguel Ángel Moyà	2 April 1984 (aged 17)		(Spain) Mallorca

=== Argentina ===
Head coach: (Argentina) Hugo Tocalli

No.	Pos.	Player	Date of birth (age)	Caps	Club
1	GK	Lucas Molina	3 March 1984 (aged 17)		(Argentina) Independiente
2	DF	Walter García	14 March 1984 (aged 17)		(Argentina) Argentinos Juniors
3	MF	Hernán Mattiuzzo	28 April 1984 (aged 17)		(Argentina) San Lorenzo
4	DF	Gonzalo Rodríguez	10 April 1984 (aged 17)		(Argentina) San Lorenzo
5	MF	Hugo Colace	6 January 1984 (aged 17)		(Argentina) Argentinos Juniors
6	DF	Rubén Salina	17 June 1984 (aged 17)		(Argentina) Independiente
7	FW	Maxi López	3 April 1984 (aged 17)		(Argentina) River Plate
8	MF	Javier Mascherano	8 June 1984 (aged 17)		(Argentina) River Plate
9	FW	Carlos Tevez	5 February 1984 (aged 17)		(Argentina) Boca Juniors
10	MF	Lucas Correa	3 February 1984 (aged 17)		(Argentina) Rosario Central
11	FW	Mauro Fanari	1 August 1984 (aged 17)		(Argentina) Independiente
12	MF	Rubens Sambueza	1 January 1984 (aged 17)		(Argentina) River Plate
13	DF	Matías Argüello	1 June 1984 (aged 17)		(Argentina) River Plate
14	DF	Raúl Gorostegui	13 May 1984 (aged 17)		(Argentina) Vélez Sársfield
15	DF	Raúl Osella	8 June 1984 (aged 17)		(Argentina) Boca Juniors
16	MF	Pablo Zabaleta	16 January 1985 (aged 16)		(Argentina) San Lorenzo
17	FW	Marcos Aguirre	30 March 1984 (aged 17)		(Argentina) Lanús
18	GK	Santiago Abete	9 February 1984 (aged 17)		(Argentina) San Lorenzo

=== Burkina Faso ===
Head Coach: (Burkina Faso) Michel Jacques Yameogo

No.	Pos.	Player	Date of birth (age)	Caps	Club
1	GK	Abdoul Kontougomde	21 February 1984 (aged 17)		(Burkina Faso) Kadre
2	DF	Lassana Kanouté	31 December 1984 (aged 16)		(Burkina Faso) Jeunesse Club
3	MF	Hamidou Kere	16 January 1984 (aged 17)		(Burkina Faso) Santos
4	MF	Zephirin Sore	31 December 1984 (aged 16)		(Burkina Faso) Santos
5	DF	Ousmane Dabre	19 March 1984 (aged 17)		(Burkina Faso) Olympic Nahour
6	DF	Jeannot Bouyain	29 March 1985 (aged 16)		(Burkina Faso) Planète Champion
7	DF	Amadou Coulibaly	31 December 1984 (aged 16)		(Burkina Faso) Racing Club de Bobo
8	MF	Saïdou Panandétiguiri	22 March 1984 (aged 17)		(France) Bordeaux
9	FW	Henoch Conombo	13 June 1986 (aged 15)		(Burkina Faso) Planète Champion
10	MF	Abdoul-Aziz Nikiema	12 June 1985 (aged 16)		(France) Bordeaux
11	FW	Wilfried Sanou	16 March 1984 (aged 17)		(Austria) WSG Wattens
12	FW	Abdoulaye Ouédraogo	17 May 1985 (aged 16)		(Burkina Faso) ASF Bobo
13	FW	Boureima Ouattara	13 January 1984 (aged 17)		(Burkina Faso) ASF Bobo
14	MF	Karim Bamba	12 June 1984 (aged 17)		(Burkina Faso) ASF Bobo
15	MF	Oumarou Ouédraogo	25 August 1984 (aged 17)		(Burkina Faso) Planète Champion
16	FW	Wally-Said Korabou	8 January 1984 (aged 17)		(Burkina Faso) Olympic Nahour
17	MF	Paul Gorogo	31 December 1984 (aged 16)		(Burkina Faso) Santos
18	GK	Aboubacar Fofana	31 December 1984 (aged 16)		(Burkina Faso) Racing Club de Bobo

== Group D ==
=== Mali ===
Head coach: (Mali) Sekou Diallo

No.	Pos.	Player	Date of birth (age)	Caps	Club
1	GK	Mamadou Traoré	23 October 1984 (aged 16)		(Mali) Onze Créateurs
2	MF	Moussa Bagayoko	10 January 1985 (aged 16)		(Mali) Djoliba
3	DF	Daouda Bagayoko	10 May 1985 (aged 16)		(Mali) Damazon
4	DF	Boucader Diallo	14 September 1984 (aged 16)		(Mali) Stade Malien
5	MF	Fako Keita	25 February 1984 (aged 17)		(Mali) Stade Malien
6	DF	Alhassane Touré	5 February 1984 (aged 17)		(Mali) Djoliba
7	FW	Lassana Diallo	18 April 1984 (aged 17)		(Mali) Djoliba
8	DF	Mamoutou Coulibaly	23 February 1984 (aged 17)		(Mali) Centre Salif Keita
9	FW	Karim Tounkara	18 June 1984 (aged 17)		(Mali) Djoliba
10	FW	Alain Claude Traoré	11 July 1984 (aged 17)		(Mali) Stade Malien
11	FW	Souleymane Dembélé	3 September 1984 (aged 17)		(Mali) Stade Malien
12	MF	Sidi Keita	20 March 1985 (aged 16)		(Mali) Djoliba
13	FW	Bakary Coulibaly	11 April 1984 (aged 17)		(Mali) Djoliba
14	DF	Modibo Cissé	20 May 1985 (aged 16)		(Mali) Centre Salif Keita
15	DF	Drissa Diakité	18 February 1985 (aged 16)		(Mali) Djoliba
16	MF	Baba Balayira	24 August 1985 (aged 16)		(Mali) Stade Malien
17	MF	Drissa Diarra	7 July 1985 (aged 16)		(Italy) Lecce
18	GK	Boubacar Keita	24 December 1984 (aged 16)		(Mali) AS N'tomi

=== Paraguay ===
Head coach: (Paraguay) Eduardo Villalba

No.	Pos.	Player	Date of birth (age)	Caps	Club
1	GK	Marco Almeda	23 March 1984 (aged 17)		(Paraguay) Cerro Porteño
2	DF	César Ávalos	19 December 1984 (aged 16)		(Paraguay) Cerro Corá
3	DF	Víctor Mareco	26 February 1984 (aged 17)		(Paraguay) Olimpia
4	DF	Ernesto Cristaldo	16 March 1984 (aged 17)		(Paraguay) Cerro Porteño
5	DF	Jorge Romero	3 May 1984 (aged 17)		(Paraguay) Sol de América
7	MF	Édgar Barreto	15 July 1984 (aged 17)		(Paraguay) Cerro Porteño
8	MF	Victorino Peralta	30 December 1984 (aged 16)		(Paraguay) Sportivo Luqueño
9	FW	Aldo Jara	25 April 1984 (aged 17)		(Paraguay) Cerro Porteño
10	FW	Andrés Pérez Matto	7 February 1984 (aged 17)		(Paraguay) Olimpia
11	MF	Blas López	14 March 1984 (aged 17)		(Paraguay) Cerro Cora
12	MF	Armando Brítez	12 October 1984 (aged 16)		(Paraguay) Sol de América
13	DF	Raúl Meza	24 March 1984 (aged 17)		(Paraguay) Cerro Porteño
14	MF	Anggello Machuca	14 September 1984 (aged 16)		(Paraguay) Olimpia
15	MF	Willian Arzamendia	11 September 1985 (aged 16)		(Paraguay) Tacuary
16	FW	Derlis Florentín	9 January 1984 (aged 17)		(Paraguay) Deportivo Humaitá
17	FW	Ariel Bernal	14 June 1984 (aged 17)		(Portugal) Union de Lamas
18	GK	Antony Silva	27 February 1984 (aged 17)		(Paraguay) Cerro Corá
19	FW	Diego Agüero	10 February 1984 (aged 17)		(Paraguay) Sport Colombia

=== Iran ===
Head coach: (Iran) Hamid Derakhshan

No.	Pos.	Player	Date of birth (age)	Caps	Club
1	GK	Hassan Houri	11 February 1985 (aged 16)		(Iran) Foolad
2	DF	Gemal Abbasi	9 April 1985 (aged 16)		(Iran) Persepolis
3	DF	Ali Alei	12 January 1984 (aged 17)		(Iran) Shahdari
4	DF	Sheys Rezaei	21 March 1984 (aged 17)		(Iran) Saipa Football Club
5	DF	Seyed Mirtoroughi	20 February 1984 (aged 17)		(Iran) Malavan
6	DF	Amin Ashorizade	8 April 1984 (aged 17)		(Iran) Malavan
7	MF	Amir Aminifar	6 September 1984 (aged 17)		(Iran) Esteghlal
8	FW	Siavash Akbarpour	21 January 1985 (aged 16)		(Iran) Fajr Sepasi
9	FW	Saeid Asadollahi	16 March 1984 (aged 17)		(Iran) Bank Melli
10	MF	Mohammad Hamrang	3 September 1984 (aged 17)		(Iran) Malavan
11	MF	Mansour Ahmadzadeh	2 October 1984 (aged 16)		(Iran) Esteghlal
12	DF	Mohammad Hasanvand	21 September 1985 (aged 15)		(Iran) Persepolis
13	MF	Hossein Kaebi	23 September 1985 (aged 15)		(Iran) Foolad
14	DF	Mohsen Arzani	23 September 1984 (aged 16)		(Iran) Bank Melli
15	MF	Hassan Bavifard	21 March 1984 (aged 17)		(Iran) Foolad Ahvaz
16	FW	Vahid Sharghi	9 February 1985 (aged 16)		(Iran) Choka Talesh
17	DF	Ehsan Rasti	28 April 1984 (aged 17)		(Iran) Bargh Shiraz
18	GK	Seyed Mirtabatabaei	21 February 1984 (aged 17)		(Iran) Esteghlal

=== Costa Rica ===
Head coach: (Costa Rica) Juan Diego Quesada

No.	Pos.	Player	Date of birth (age)	Caps	Club
1	GK	Marco Herrera	4 July 1984 (aged 17)		(Costa Rica) Municipal Liberia
2	DF	Eduardo Gómez	17 September 1984 (aged 16)		(Costa Rica) Municipal Liberia
3	DF	Gabriel Badilla	30 June 1984 (aged 17)		(Costa Rica) Deportivo Saprissa
4	DF	Roger Estrada	12 March 1984 (aged 17)		(Costa Rica) Alajuelense
5	MF	Saúl Phillips	3 October 1984 (aged 16)		(Costa Rica) Alajuelense
6	DF	Carlos Johnson	10 July 1984 (aged 17)		(Costa Rica) Cartaginés
7	MF	Paolo Jiménez	28 January 1984 (aged 17)		(Costa Rica) Cartaginés
8	FW	Randall Azofeifa	30 December 1984 (aged 16)		(Costa Rica) Deportivo Saprissa
9	FW	Gilberto Salas	29 June 1984 (aged 17)		(Costa Rica) Alajuelense
10	MF	Christian Bolaños	17 May 1984 (aged 17)		(Costa Rica) Deportivo Saprissa
11	FW	Kraesher Mooke	13 March 1984 (aged 17)		(Costa Rica) Envaco
12	FW	Roy Miller	24 November 1984 (aged 16)		(Costa Rica) Cartaginés
13	FW	Armando Alonso	21 March 1984 (aged 17)		(Costa Rica) Alajuelense
14	DF	Diego Mejias	1 January 1984 (aged 17)		(Costa Rica) Cartaginés
15	MF	Jason Zúñiga	11 February 1985 (aged 16)		(Costa Rica) Municipal Liberia
16	MF	Diego Gallo	16 February 1986 (aged 15)		(Costa Rica) Santos
17	FW	Gustavo Pérez	18 September 1984 (aged 16)		(Costa Rica) Guanacaste
18	GK	Pablo Quesada	24 February 1984 (aged 17)		(Costa Rica) Alajuelense
