= Afro–Costa Ricans =

Costa Ricans of African ancestry

Afro-Costa Ricans
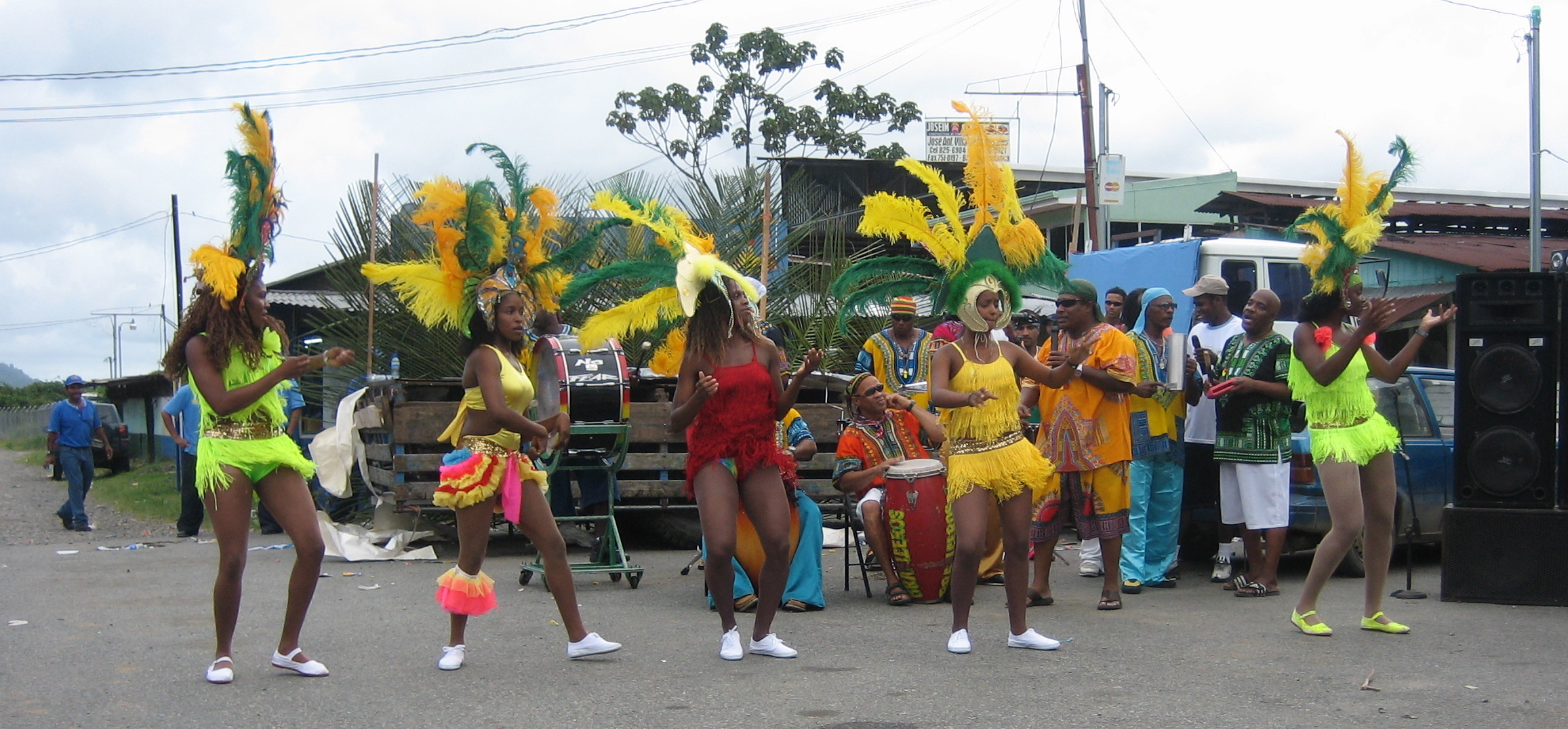
- Calypso dancers from Puerto Limón during an event in Bribrí, Talamanca.

Total population
- c. 400,000; 8% of the Costa Rican population

Regions with significant populations
- Puerto Limon; San Jose; Alajuela; Heredia

Languages
- Spanish; English creole

Religion
- Roman Catholicism; Baptists; Agnosticism; Christianity

Related ethnic groups
- Afro-Caribbean, other Black Latin Americans

Afro–Costa Ricans are Costa Ricans of African ancestry.

Costa Rica has four small minority groups: Mulattoes, Blacks, Amerindians and Asians (primarily Chinese/East Asian). About eight percent of the population is of African descent or Mulatto (mix of European and African) who are called Afro–Costa Ricans. A large portion of this group descends from the late 19th, and early 20th century waves of Afro-Caribbean migrant workers (mostly from Jamaica). They represent the largest community of Jamaican origin outside of Jamaica's Anglophone-dominated diaspora. However, not all Black Costa Ricans are descended from these groups, as some are directly descended from colonial-era enslaved Africans imported to Costa Rica by the Spanish. This latter group, however, is more likely to be mulatto, or tri-racial.

== History ==
The first recorded arrival of people of African descent in Costa Rica came with the Spanish conquistadors. Slave trade was common in all the countries conquered by Spain, and in Costa Rica the first Black people seem to have come from specific sources in Africa- Equatorial and Western regions. People from these regions were considered ideal slaves due to a perceived reputation for being more robust, affable and hard-working than other Africans. They came from what is now the Gambia (Mandingas), Guinea (specifically Wolofe), Ghanaian (Ashanti), Benin (specifically Ije / Ararás) and Sudan (Puras). Many were also Minas (enslaved people from parts of the region extending from Ivory Coast to the Slave Coast), Popo (be imported tribes as Ana and Baribas), Yorubas and Congas (perhaps from Kongasso, Ivory Coast). Slaves also came from other places, such as neighboring Panama.

However, the following century witnessed a gradual lessening of the differences between Black people and their white owners. As whites took Black women as their concubines, they freed the children that were born from this union. The same thing started to happen with the "zambos", born of Amerindians and Black people. During the time of slavery, the slaves worked on cattle ranches of Guanacaste and the Central Valley plantations and cacao plantations in Matina, whose situation was more difficult. Over time, many whites freed their slaves and slavery was abolished in 1823, along with the other Central American countries.

The largest Costa Rican Black community is from the Caribbean, which today constitutes the majority of the Costa Rican Black population. Costa Rica has the largest Jamaican diaspora after Cuba and Panama and its development as a nation is witness to this contribution.

Since 1850, fishermen of Afro-Caribbean origin began to settle in the Caribbean coast of Costa Rica, especially from Panama and the West Indies. They stayed in temporary camps during fishing seasons, from March to September, to plant coconuts, cassava, and yams, which were then harvested the following season. Since 1828, some of these fishermen began to settle in Costa Rica permanently with their families.

Towards the second half of the 19th century, coffee became the main export of Costa Rica. The crops were transported from the Pacific Coast, by an inaccessible jungle terrain of the Atlantic Coast. To be taken to Europe, they had to turn back to South America, which increased the cost and removed competitiveness . To remedy this situation, in 1871 a railway and a port on the Atlantic Coast were constructed. Because of the scarcity of local labor, workers were imported from Italy, China, and the Caribbean and Central America. This coincided with an employment crisis in Jamaica that caused an exodus to neighboring countries. On December 20, 1872, the Lizzie, the first boat from Jamaica, arrived at the port of Limón with 123 workers to work on the railroad. From this moment, the number of Jamaican workers in Limon increased rapidly and the following year saw over 1,000 Jamaican workers in the port.

Many Jamaicans intended to return home, but most remained in the province of Limón on the Caribbean Coast. In 1890 the railways suffered a financial crisis, forcing many workers to sustain themselves by working in agriculture. This in turn saw the laborers establishing relationships and cultural exchanges with native populations of these areas. Later, the Jamaican workers began working for the banana industry, whose production grew to its peak in 1907.

Usually these workers lived on the plantations and had little knowledge of Costa Rica beyond their immediate environment. The contact was minimal because the Costa Rican banana plantations were in foreign hands. They did not speak Spanish and retained Jamaican customs. They had their own schools with teachers brought from Jamaica. Until 1949 Costa Rica had segregation laws where Black people lived exclusively in the Caribbean Province of Puerto Limón. By 2011 Afro–Costa Ricans were spread in all 7 Costa Rican provinces: 32% of them in San José, 16% in Alajuela, 15% in Limón, 10% in Heredia and 8% in Cartago and Guanacaste. Today, Afro–Costa Rican people are part of different disciplines and fields in Costa Rica.

== Notable Afro-Costa Ricans ==
=== Politics ===
- Epsy Campbell Barr, former vice president
- Eduardo Cruickshank, politician, former deputy and evangelical pastor
- Maureen Clarke, lawyer and former deputy
- Thelma Curling Rodríguez, jurist and politician

=== Sports ===
- Alvaro Saborio, footballer
- Jake Beckford, footballer
- Try Bennett, footballer
- Jewison Bennette, footballer
- Kurt Bernard, footballer
- Felicio Brown Forbes, footballer
- Keyner Brown, footballer
- Steven Bryce, footballer
- Berny Burke, footballer
- Joel Campbell, footballer
- Kenny Cunningham, footballer
- Errol Daniels, footballer
- Rudy Dawson, footballer
- Donald De La Haye, American Football player
- Jervis Drummond, footballer
- Neighel Drummond, footballer
- Jordy Evans, footballer
- Waylon Francis, footballer
- Julio Fuller, footballer
- Keysher Fuller, footballer
- Mayron George, footballer
- Álvaro Grant, footballer
- Donny Grant, footballer
- Floyd Guthrie, footballer
- Jaylon Hadden, footballer
- Denis Hamlett, footballer
- Cameron Johnson, footballer
- Carlos Johnson, footballer
- Derrick Johnson, footballer
- Rodrigo Kenton, footballer
- Ariel Lassiter, footballer
- Ian Lawrence, footballer
- Jedwin Lester, footballer
- Dexter Lewis, footballer
- Leroy Lewis, footballer
- Dennis Marshall, footballer
- Jonathan McDonald, footballer
- Hernán Medford, footballer
- Jaikel Medina, footballer
- Roy Miller, footballer
- Rodolfo Mills, footballer
- Josué Mitchell, footballer
- Kraesher Mooke, footballer
- Lester Morgan, footballer
- Bernard Mullins, footballer
- Roy Myers, footballer
- David Myrie, footballer
- Roy Myrie, footballer
- Edder Nelson, footballer
- Jhamir Ordain, footballer
- Reynaldo Parks, footballer
- Winston Parks, footballer
- Fernando Patterson, footballer
- Patrick Pemberton, footballer
- Saúl Phillips, footballer
- Allard Plummer, footballer
- Alexander Robinson, footballer
- Manfred Russell, footballer
- Erick Scott, footballer
- Jean Scott, footballer
- Miguel Simpson, footballer
- Orlando Sinclair, footballer
- Jordan Smith, footballer
- Richard Smith, footballer
- Roy Smith, footballer
- William Sunsing, footballer
- Carlos Toppings, footballer
- Harold Wallace, footballer
- Rodney Wallace, footballer
- Javier Wanchope, footballer
- Paulo Wanchope, footballer
- Vicente Wanchope, footballer
- Kendall Waston, footballer
- Carlos Watson, footballer
- Jorge White, footballer
- Roan Wilson, footballer
- Whayne Wilson, footballer
- Johnny Woodly, footballer
- Berny Wright, footballer
- Mauricio Wright, footballer
