= List of people from Limón, Costa Rica =

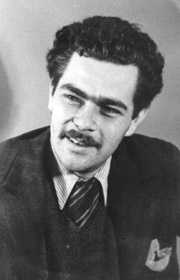
Joaquín Gutiérrez

Below follows a list of notables from the city of Limón, Costa Rica.

== Activism ==
- Jairo Mora (1987–2013), environmentalist.

== Business ==
- Walter Kissling (1931–2002).

== Film and television ==
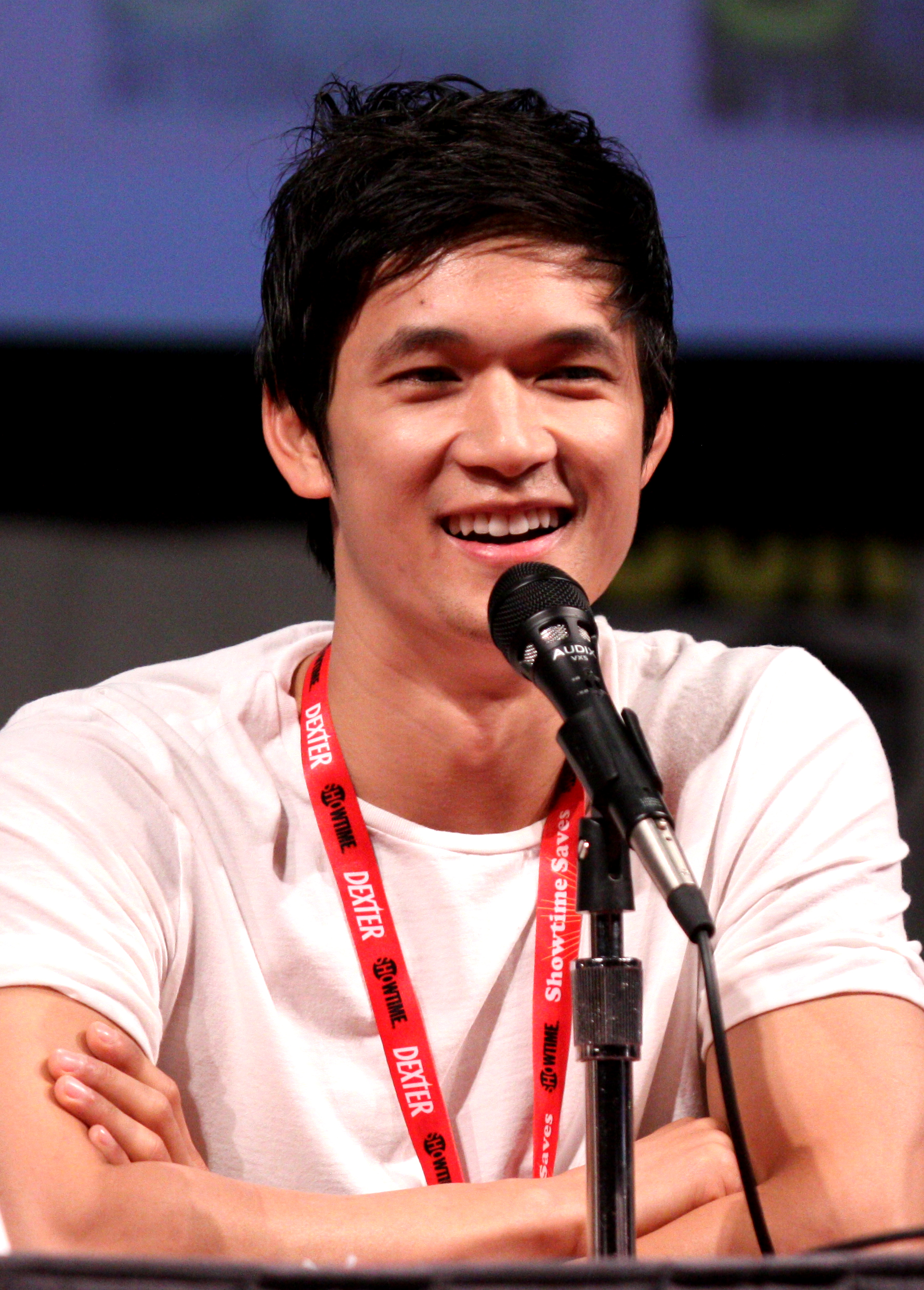
Harry Shum, Jr.

- Harry Shum Jr. (b. 1982), actor (Glee).

== Literature ==
- Joaquín Gutiérrez (1918–2000), writer.

== Politics ==
- Maureen Clarke (b. 1952), deputy for the National Liberation Party (2014–2018).

== Sports ==
=== American and Canadian football ===
- Donald De La Haye (b. 1996), placekicker (Toronto Argonauts) and YouTube personality

=== Boxing ===
- Carl Davis (b. 1970), heavyweight boxer.

=== Football ===
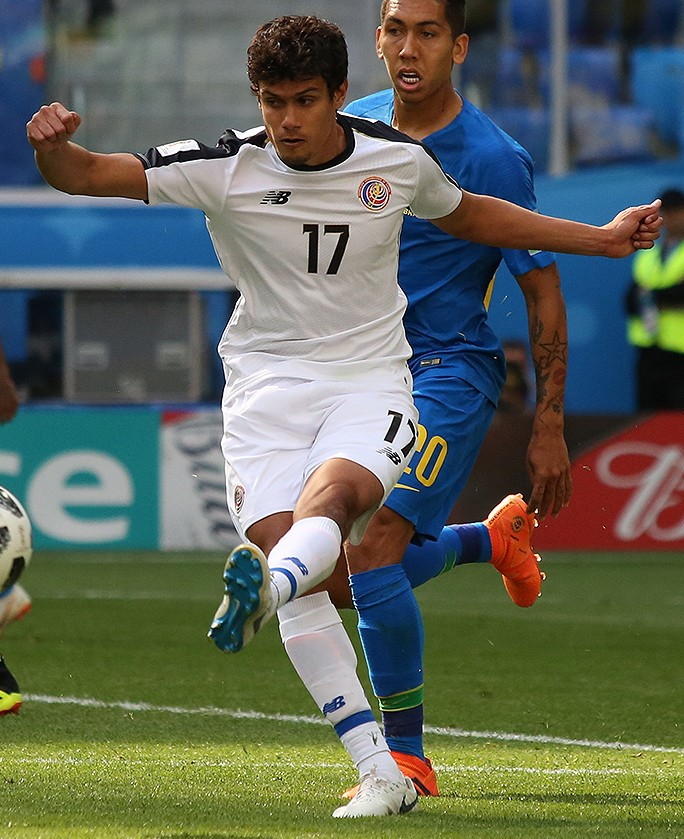
Yeltsin Tejeda

- Kurt Bernard (b. 1977), retired striker.
- Juan Cayasso (b. 1961), retired striker.
- Henry Cooper (b. 1989), striker (Golfito).
- Víctor Coto (b. 1990), striker.
- Enrique Díaz (b. 1959), retired midfielder.
- Gerald Drummond (b. 1976), retired striker.
- Jervis Drummond (b. 1976), retired defender.
- Waylon Francis (b. 1990), defender (Columbus Crew).
- Julio Fuller (1956–2019), defender.
- Andy Furtado (b. 1980), striker.
- Mayron George (b. 1993), striker (Budapest Honvéd).
- Donny Grant (b. 1976), retired goalkeeper.
- Denis Hamlett (b. 1969), retired defender.
- Andy Herron (b. 1978), retired striker.
- César Hines (b. 1958), retired defender.
- Derrick Johnson (b. 1989), defender (Barrio México).
- Rodrigo Kenton (b. 1955), coach.
- Leroy Lewis (b. 1945), coach.
- Dennis Marshall (1985–2011), defender.
- Rodolfo Mills (b. 1958), retired defender.
- Fernando Montero (b. 1948), retired striker.
- Kraesher Mooke (b. 1984), retired midfielder.
- Roy Myrie (b. 1982), defender.
- Edder Nelson (b. 1986), midfielder (La U Universitarios).
- Reynaldo Parks (b. 1974), retired defender.
- Winston Parks (b. 1981), retired striker.
- Patrick Pemberton (b. 1982), goalkeeper (San Carlos).
- Allard Plummer (b. 1949), retired striker.
- Enrique Rivers (b. 1961), retired midfielder.
- Erick Scott (b. 1981), retired striker.
- Richard Smith (b. 1967), retired midfielder.
- Roy Smith (b. 1990), defender (Limón).
- Yeltsin Tejeda (b. 1992), midfielder (Herediano).
- Carlos Toppings (1953–2007), defender.
- Johan Venegas (b. 1988), midfielder (Saprissa).
- Vicente Wanchope (b. 1946), retired striker.
- Carlos Watson (b. 1951), coach.
- Whayne Wilson (1975–2005), striker.
- Josue Monge

=== Track and field ===
- Nery Brenes (b. 1985), sprinter.
- Sherman Guity (b. 1996), Paralympic sprinter.
- Sharolyn Scott (b. 1983), hurdler.
