= 2011 CONCACAF U-17 Championship squads =

The 2011 CONCACAF U-17 Championship took place in February 2011. Each national association selected 20 players who were born on or after 1 January 1994.

== Group A ==
=== Costa Rica ===
Head coach: Luis Diego Arnaez

No.	Pos.	Player	Date of birth (age)	Club
1	GK	Pedro Francisco Roman	24 February 1994 (aged 16)	(Costa Rican Football Federation) Liga Deportiva Alajuelense
2	DF	Willian Alban Fernandez	15 May 1994 (aged 16)	(Costa Rican Football Federation) Deportivo Saprissa
3	DF	Fernando Eduardo Gonzalez	30 April 1994 (aged 16)	(Costa Rican Football Federation) Deportivo Saprissa
4	DF	David Ernesto Acuña	29 April 1994 (aged 16)	(Costa Rican Football Federation) Liga Deportiva Alajuelense
5	DF	Kishner Joriel Lopez	8 February 1994 (aged 17)	(Costa Rican Football Federation) Liga Deportiva Alajuelense
6	DF	Jose Badilla	25 October 1994 (aged 16)	(Costa Rican Football Federation) Deportivo Saprissa
7	MF	Jake Beckford	31 July 1994 (aged 16)	(Costa Rican Football Federation) Deportivo Saprissa
8	MF	Luis Jose Sequeira	11 May 1994 (aged 16)	(Costa Rican Football Federation) Liga Deportiva Alajuelense
9	FW	John Jairo Ruiz	10 January 1994 (aged 17)	(Costa Rican Football Federation) Deportivo Saprissa
10	MF	Gabriel Fernando Leiva	27 August 1994 (aged 16)	(Costa Rican Football Federation) Deportivo Saprissa
11	MF	Malcon Nackey Frago	19 July 1995 (aged 15)	(Costa Rican Football Federation) Deportivo Saprissa
12	MF	Reimond Salas	11 March 1994 (aged 16)	(Costa Rican Football Federation) SD Santos-Guapilés
14	FW	Jose Fabricio Quintero	11 April 1994 (aged 16)	Free agent
15	DF	Kelin Reinaldo Angulo	8 January 1994 (aged 17)	(Costa Rican Football Federation) Liga Deportiva Alajuelense
16	MF	Ronald Alberto Matarrita	9 July 1994 (aged 16)	(Costa Rican Football Federation) Liga Deportiva Alajuelense
17	DF	Irving Esteban Calderon	15 April 1994 (aged 16)	(Costa Rican Football Federation) Brujas FC Escazú
18	GK	Jussef Nelson Delgado	27 January 1994 (aged 17)	(Costa Rican Football Federation) Deportivo Saprissa
19	FW	Jean Scott Hernandez	14 March 1994 (aged 16)	(Costa Rican Football Federation) C.S. Herediano
20	DF	William Quirós	19 October 1994 (aged 16)	(Costa Rican Football Federation) Deportivo Saprissa
23	GK	Clever Omar Leon	21 May 1994 (aged 16)	(Costa Rican Football Federation) Limon FC

=== El Salvador ===
Head coach: Victor Manuel Pacheco

No.	Pos.	Player	Date of birth (age)	Club
1	GK	Rolando Ernesto Morales	1 March 1994 (aged 16)	(Salvadoran Football Federation) Turín FESA F.C.
2	DF	Gilberto Giovanni Peña	28 January 1994 (aged 17)	(Salvadoran Football Federation) Turín FESA F.C.
3	DF	Victorino Aristides Zelaya	8 December 1994 (aged 16)	(Salvadoran Football Federation) Turín FESA F.C.
4	MF	Nelson Zelaya	11 April 1994 (aged 16)	(Salvadoran Football Federation) C.D. Aspirante
5	MF	Jose Alfredo Villavicencio	24 January 1995 (aged 16)	(Salvadoran Football Federation) Turín FESA F.C.
6	MF	Brayan Balmore Landaverde	27 May 1995 (aged 15)	(Salvadoran Football Federation) Turín FESA F.C.
8	MF	Diego Elenilson Galdamez	26 August 1994 (aged 16)	(Salvadoran Football Federation) Turín FESA F.C.
9	FW	Jose Angel Peña	10 December 1994 (aged 16)	(Salvadoran Football Federation) Turín FESA F.C.
10	MF	Eder Antonio Polanco	28 March 1994 (aged 16)	(Salvadoran Football Federation) Turín FESA F.C.
11	FW	Ivan Alexander Castro	5 January 1994 (aged 17)	(Salvadoran Football Federation) C.D. Atlético Morazán
12	DF	Moises Alexander Mejia	11 December 1994 (aged 16)	(Salvadoran Football Federation) Turín FESA F.C.
13	FW	Rommel Mejía	4 February 1994 (aged 17)	(Salvadoran Football Federation) C.D. Dragón
14	MF	Alvaro Ramon Lizama	24 May 1995 (aged 15)	(Salvadoran Football Federation) Turín FESA F.C.
15	DF	Olivier Alonso Ayala	4 January 1994 (aged 17)	(Salvadoran Football Federation) Turín FESA F.C.
16	DF	Kevin Misael Barahona	1 October 1994 (aged 16)	(Salvadoran Football Federation) Turín FESA F.C.
17	FW	Gerardo Enrique Iraheta	17 August 1994 (aged 16)	(Salvadoran Football Federation) Santa Tecla F.C.
18	GK	Wilberth Alberto Hernandez	5 April 1994 (aged 16)	(Salvadoran Football Federation) Turín FESA F.C.
19	DF	Giovanny Josafat Zavaleta	27 September 1994 (aged 16)	(Salvadoran Football Federation) Turín FESA F.C.
20	MF	Saul Tyler Varela	27 August 1994 (aged 16)	(Salvadoran Football Federation) Brampton United
22	GK	Luis Francisco Mina	22 January 1994 (aged 17)	(Salvadoran Football Federation) Turín FESA F.C.

=== Haiti ===
Head coach: Wilner Etienne

No.	Pos.	Player	Date of birth (age)	Club
1	GK	Wendy Thoby	22 December 1995 (aged 15)	(Haitian Football Federation) Fédération Haïtienne De Football (FHF)
4	DF	Jean Ismael Voltaire	4 May 1994 (aged 16)	(Haitian Football Federation) Fédération Haïtienne De Football (FHF)
5	DF	Jerry Saint-Vil	22 June 1995 (aged 15)	(Haitian Football Federation) Fédération Haïtienne De Football (FHF)
6	DF	Ryswick Landeau	24 December 1994 (aged 16)	(Haitian Football Federation) Fédération Haïtienne De Football (FHF)
7	MF	Daniel Gedeon	23 February 1995 (aged 15)	(Haitian Football Federation) Fédération Haïtienne De Football (FHF)
8	MF	Evans Saint-Jean	26 June 1994 (aged 16)	(Haitian Football Federation) Fédération Haïtienne De Football (FHF)
9	FW	Johnley Chery	20 September 1994 (aged 16)	(Haitian Football Federation) Fédération Haïtienne De Football (FHF)
10	MF	Kerlins Georges	10 April 1994 (aged 16)	(Haitian Football Federation) Fédération Haïtienne De Football (FHF)
11	FW	Benchy Estama	14 June 1994 (aged 16)	(Haitian Football Federation) Fédération Haïtienne De Football (FHF)
12	GK	Romel Desrosiers	9 February 1994 (aged 17)	(Haitian Football Federation) Fédération Haïtienne De Football (FHF)
13	MF	Savey Jefferson	3 January 1994 (aged 17)	(Haitian Football Federation) Fédération Haïtienne De Football (FHF)
14	DF	Pompee Samuel Mardochee	12 April 1994 (aged 16)	(Haitian Football Federation) Fédération Haïtienne De Football (FHF)
15	DF	Jonathan Monplaisir	15 November 1995 (aged 15)	(Haitian Football Federation) Fédération Haïtienne De Football (FHF)
16	MF	Claudenor Gateau	11 April 1994 (aged 16)	(Haitian Football Federation) Fédération Haïtienne De Football (FHF)
17	MF	Edson Etienne	26 March 1994 (aged 16)	(Haitian Football Federation) Fédération Haïtienne De Football (FHF)
18	MF	Andy Anglade	10 January 1994 (aged 17)	(Haitian Football Federation) Fédération Haïtienne De Football (FHF)
19	FW	Clifford Nau	15 August 1994 (aged 16)	(Haitian Football Federation) Fédération Haïtienne De Football (FHF)
20	FW	Jean Bertrand Francois	7 February 1995 (aged 16)	(Haitian Football Federation) Fédération Haïtienne De Football (FHF)
21	FW	Demosthene Luckenson	13 March 1994 (aged 16)	(Haitian Football Federation) Fédération Haïtienne De Football (FHF)
22	MF	Etienne Renato	14 June 1994 (aged 16)	(Haitian Football Federation) Fédération Haïtienne De Football (FHF)

== Group B ==
=== Cuba ===
Head coach: Israel Blake

No.	Pos.	Player	Date of birth (age)	Club
1	GK	Sandy Sánchez	27 March 1994 (aged 16)	(Football Association of Cuba) FC Las Tunas
2	DF	Alejandro Caja	13 January 1995 (aged 16)	(Football Association of Cuba) FC Santiago de Cuba
3	DF	Emmanuel Labrada	19 January 1994 (aged 17)	(Football Association of Cuba) CF Granma
4	DF	Adrián Diz	4 March 1994 (aged 16)	(Football Association of Cuba) FC La Habana
5	DF	Brian Rosales	7 March 1995 (aged 15)	(Football Association of Cuba) FC Matanzas
6	MF	Andy Baquero	17 March 1994 (aged 16)	(Football Association of Cuba) FC La Habana
7	FW	Kianz Froese	16 April 1996 (aged 14)	(Football Association of Cuba) FC La Habana
8	DF	Yolexis Collado	21 January 1994 (aged 17)	(Football Association of Cuba) FC La Habana
9	MF	Dairon Pérez	7 June 1994 (aged 16)	(Football Association of Cuba) FC La Habana
10	MF	Frank López	25 February 1994 (aged 16)	(Football Association of Cuba) FC Cienfuegos
11	FW	Daniel Luis Sáez	11 May 1994 (aged 16)	(Football Association of Cuba) FC La Habana
12	GK	Delvis Lumpuy	8 February 1995 (aged 16)	(Football Association of Cuba) FC Villa Clara
13	MF	Sajay Herrera	27 March 1994 (aged 16)	(Football Association of Cuba) FC Las Tunas
14	DF	Yosel Piedra	27 March 1994 (aged 16)	(Football Association of Cuba) FC Villa Clara
15	MF	Osmany Capote	11 March 1995 (aged 15)	(Football Association of Cuba) FC Villa Clara
16	FW	Javier Aguilar	24 March 1994 (aged 16)	(Football Association of Cuba) FC Ciego de Ávila
17	MF	Lázaro Mezquía	3 January 1994 (aged 17)	(Football Association of Cuba) FC Pinar del Río
18	MF	René Abreu	17 October 1994 (aged 16)	(Football Association of Cuba) FC Cienfuegos

=== Panama ===
Head coach: Jorge Dely Valdés

No.	Pos.	Player	Date of birth (age)	Club
1	GK	Ivan Picart	2 August 1994 (aged 16)	(Panamanian Football Federation) Río Abajo
2	DF	Eric Francisco	19 January 1994 (aged 17)	(Panamanian Football Federation) Chepo F.C.
3	DF	Jose Maughn	9 January 1994 (aged 17)	(Panamanian Football Federation) Chorillo F.C.
4	DF	Roberto Pinto	7 August 1994 (aged 16)	(Panamanian Football Federation) Tauro FC
5	DF	Roberto Chen	24 May 1994 (aged 16)	(Panamanian Football Federation) San Francisco FC
6	DF	Anel Vargas	24 August 1994 (aged 16)	(Panamanian Football Federation) Coclé
7	MF	Dario Wright	25 April 1994 (aged 16)	(Panamanian Football Federation) Millenium UP
8	FW	Salvatore Messina	4 March 1995 (aged 15)	(Panamanian Football Federation) Dinamo
9	FW	Omar Browne	3 May 1994 (aged 16)	(Panamanian Football Federation) Millenium UP
10	MF	Darwin Pinzon	2 April 1994 (aged 16)	(Panamanian Football Federation) Sporting San Miguelito
11	FW	Aldair Paredes	2 November 1994 (aged 16)	(Panamanian Football Federation) Millenium UP
12	GK	Joseph Vargas	23 May 1994 (aged 16)	(Panamanian Football Federation) Millenium UP
13	DF	Francisco Narbon	11 February 1995 (aged 16)	(Panamanian Football Federation) Chepo F.C.
15	FW	Romario Piggot	17 July 1995 (aged 15)	(Panamanian Football Federation) Chepo F.C.
16	MF	Alonzo Goot	26 August 1994 (aged 16)	(Panamanian Football Federation) Ciclón FC
17	MF	Bryan Santamaria	12 May 1994 (aged 16)	(Panamanian Football Federation) San Francisco FC
18	FW	Jorman Aguilar	11 September 1994 (aged 16)	(Panamanian Football Federation) Río Abajo
19	FW	Alfredo Stephens	25 December 1994 (aged 16)	(Panamanian Football Federation) Río Abajo
20	MF	Alexander González	14 December 1994 (aged 16)	(Panamanian Football Federation) Río Abajo
21	MF	Gilberto Villa	30 September 1994 (aged 16)	(Panamanian Football Federation) Ciclón FC

=== United States ===
Head coach: Wilmer Cabrera

No.	Pos.	Player	Date of birth (age)	Club
1	GK	Fernando Pina	29 January 1994 (aged 17)	(United States Soccer Federation) Houston Dynamo Academy
2	DF	Andrew Souders	26 February 1994 (aged 16)	(United States Soccer Federation) Columbus Crew Academy
3	DF	Kellyn Acosta	24 July 1995 (aged 15)	(United States Soccer Federation) FC Dallas Academy
4	DF	Nathan Smith	18 October 1994 (aged 16)	(United States Soccer Federation) Cal Odyssey
5	MF	Matthew Dunn	13 January 1994 (aged 17)	(German Football Association) 1. FC Köln
6	DF	Mobi Fehr	13 December 1994 (aged 16)	(Japan Football Association) Tokyo Verdy
7	FW	Alfred Koroma	19 April 1994 (aged 16)	(United States Soccer Federation) Solar Chelsea SC
8	MF	Esteban Rodriguez	11 February 1994 (aged 17)	(United States Soccer Federation) Cosmos Academy West
9	MF	Mario Rodriguez	12 May 1994 (aged 16)	(United States Soccer Federation) Central Aztecs
10	MF	Alejandro Guido	22 March 1994 (aged 16)	(United States Soccer Federation) Aztecs Premier
11	MF	Marc Pelosi	17 June 1994 (aged 16)	(United States Soccer Federation) DeAnza Force
12	MF	Joseph Amon	14 June 1994 (aged 16)	(United States Soccer Federation) South Carolina United FC
13	MF	Dillon Serna	25 March 1994 (aged 16)	(United States Soccer Federation) South Carolina United FC
14	MF	Tarik Salkicic	3 June 1994 (aged 16)	(United States Soccer Federation) Strictly Soccer
15	MF	Jordan Allen	25 April 1995 (aged 15)	(United States Soccer Federation) Empire United
16	FW	Andrew Oliver	2 January 1994 (aged 17)	(United States Soccer Federation) Westside United
17	DF	Zach Carroll	16 March 1994 (aged 16)	(United States Soccer Federation) Vardar
18	GK	Kendall McIntosh	24 January 1994 (aged 17)	(United States Soccer Federation) Mustang SC
19	FW	Jack McBean	15 December 1994 (aged 16)	(United States Soccer Federation) LA Galaxy Academy
20	FW	Paul Arriola	5 February 1995 (aged 16)	(United States Soccer Federation) Arsenal F.C. (California)

== Group C ==
=== Guatemala ===
Head coach: Gary Stempel

No.	Pos.	Player	Date of birth (age)	Club
1	GK	Jhony Alexander Navarro	17 August 1994 (aged 16)	(National Football Federation of Guatemala) FNFG
2	DF	Gerardo Arturo Gordillo	17 August 1994 (aged 16)	(National Football Federation of Guatemala) FNFG
3	DF	Kevin Emanuel Ruiz	18 May 1995 (aged 15)	(National Football Federation of Guatemala) FNFG
4	DF	Alvaro Fernando Tuna	4 January 1994 (aged 17)	(National Football Federation of Guatemala) FNFG
5	MF	Julio Ivan Ortiz	1 January 1995 (aged 16)	(National Football Federation of Guatemala) FNFG
6	DF	Cristian Alexander Jimenez	26 April 1995 (aged 15)	(National Football Federation of Guatemala) FNFG
7	MF	Christopher Rodolfo Ramirez	8 January 1994 (aged 17)	(National Football Federation of Guatemala) FNFG
8	MF	Franklin Eduardo Garcia	3 June 1994 (aged 16)	(National Football Federation of Guatemala) FNFG
9	FW	Hristopher Rodolfo Robles	4 June 1994 (aged 16)	(National Football Federation of Guatemala) FNFG
10	FW	Albert Ismael Barrientos	1 July 1994 (aged 16)	(National Football Federation of Guatemala) FNFG
11	DF	Luis Emanuel Perez	23 August 1994 (aged 16)	(National Football Federation of Guatemala) FNFG
12	GK	Jonathan Yoel Hernandez	17 August 1994 (aged 16)	(National Football Federation of Guatemala) FNFG
13	MF	Brallan Josue Figueroa	16 February 1995 (aged 15)	(National Football Federation of Guatemala) FNFG
14	DF	Diego Fernando Ramos	6 March 1994 (aged 16)	(National Football Federation of Guatemala) FNFG
15	MF	Santos Uriel Monzon	26 March 1994 (aged 16)	(National Football Federation of Guatemala) FNFG
16	DF	Brandon Josue De Leon	27 January 1994 (aged 17)	(National Football Federation of Guatemala) FNFG
17	FW	Kevin Josue Merida	18 November 1994 (aged 16)	(National Football Federation of Guatemala) FNFG
18	DF	Bryan Manolo Lemus	1 April 1994 (aged 16)	(National Football Federation of Guatemala) FNFG
19	MF	Wagner Gabriel Morales	17 June 1995 (aged 15)	(National Football Federation of Guatemala) FNFG
20	FW	Jose Victor Avila	19 February 1994 (aged 16)	(National Football Federation of Guatemala) FNFG

=== Jamaica ===
Head coach: Wendell Downswell

No.	Pos.	Player	Date of birth (age)	Club
1	GK	Richard Trench	8 May 1994 (aged 16)	Free agent
2	DF	Oshane Jenkins	20 March 1994 (aged 16)	Free agent
3	DF	Kemo Wallace	29 September 1994 (aged 16)	Free agent
4	FW	Junior Flemmings	16 January 1996 (aged 15)	Free agent
5	DF	Alvas Powell	18 July 1994 (aged 16)	Free agent
6	DF	Quante Smith	12 February 1994 (aged 17)	Free agent
7	FW	Romario Williams	15 August 1994 (aged 16)	Free agent
8	MF	Romario Jones	15 May 1994 (aged 16)	Free agent
9	MF	Omar Holness	13 March 1994 (aged 16)	Free agent
10	FW	Jason Wright	26 December 1994 (aged 16)	Free agent
11	MF	Andre Lewis	12 August 1994 (aged 16)	Free agent
12	DF	Patrick Palmer	25 July 1994 (aged 16)	Free agent
13	GK	Odean Clarke	9 January 1994 (aged 17)	Free agent
14	MF	Jevani Brown	16 October 1994 (aged 16)	(The Football Association) Milton Keynes Dons
15	MF	Troy Moo Penn	22 July 1995 (aged 15)	Free agent
16	DF	Ramone Brown	6 February 1994 (aged 17)	Free agent
17	FW	Javia Roberts	3 July 1994 (aged 16)	(The Football Association) West Bromwich Albion
18	MF	King Kaya Beckford	18 July 1994 (aged 16)	(Royal Spanish Football Federation) Valencia CF Academy
19	MF	Cordel Benbow	3 June 1995 (aged 15)	Free agent
20	MF	Shawn Lawson	13 January 1994 (aged 17)	Free agent

=== Trinidad and Tobago ===
Head coach: Shawn Cooper

No.	Pos.	Player	Date of birth (age)	Club
1	GK	Quesi Weston	7 July 1994 (aged 16)	(Trinidad and Tobago Football Association) United Petrotrin F.C.
2	DF	Tarik Nicholls	26 December 1994 (aged 16)	(Trinidad and Tobago Football Association) San Juan Jabloteh
3	DF	Nicholas Marcano	22 July 1994 (aged 16)	(Trinidad and Tobago Football Association) Joe Public B
4	DF	Dario Holmes	9 February 1994 (aged 17)	(Trinidad and Tobago Football Association) St. Clair Coaching School
5	DF	Damani Richards	30 November 1994 (aged 16)	(Trinidad and Tobago Football Association) Joe Public B
6	MF	Adan Noel	27 October 1994 (aged 16)	(Trinidad and Tobago Football Association) W Connection F.C.
7	MF	Neil Benjamin	20 August 1994 (aged 16)	(Trinidad and Tobago Football Association) W Connection F.C.
8	MF	Karl Muckette	1 July 1995 (aged 15)	(Trinidad and Tobago Football Association) 1st FC Santa Rosa
9	FW	Shackiel Henry	2 April 1994 (aged 16)	(Trinidad and Tobago Football Association) United Petrotrin F.C.
10	MF	Jomal Williams	28 April 1994 (aged 16)	(Trinidad and Tobago Football Association) Caledonia
11	MF	Garvin Samaroo	16 January 1994 (aged 17)	(Trinidad and Tobago Football Association) San Juan Jabloteh
12	FW	Dwight Quintero	20 January 1994 (aged 17)	(Trinidad and Tobago Football Association) Joe Public B
13	MF	Tevonne Morris	28 September 1994 (aged 16)	(Trinidad and Tobago Football Association) W Connection F.C.
14	FW	Akeem Garcia	11 September 1996 (aged 14)	(Trinidad and Tobago Football Association) San Juan Jabloteh
15	FW	Isaiah Noriega	17 March 1994 (aged 16)	(United States Soccer Federation) Houston Dynamo Academy
16	MF	Glenn Sutton	4 July 1994 (aged 16)	(Trinidad and Tobago Football Association) W Connection F.C.
17	MF	Kiel Pierre	30 August 1994 (aged 16)	(Trinidad and Tobago Football Association) St. Ann's Rangers F.C.
18	DF	Anthony Charles	28 August 1994 (aged 16)	(Trinidad and Tobago Football Association) W Connection F.C.
19	DF	Rondell Phillip	16 March 1995 (aged 15)	(Trinidad and Tobago Football Association) W Connection F.C.

== Group D ==
=== Barbados ===
Head coach: Kenville Layne

No.	Pos.	Player	Date of birth (age)	Club
2	DF	Raheem Thomas	17 February 1994 (aged 16)	(Barbados Football Association) Ellerton FC
3	DF	Romario Griffith	2 November 1994 (aged 16)	Free agent
4	MF	Nathanael Joseph Maynard	7 June 1994 (aged 16)	(Barbados Football Association) Kick Start
5	DF	Dayo Andre Ward	15 December 1994 (aged 16)	(Barbados Football Association) Melbourne
6	DF	Jevon Damen Durant	4 October 1994 (aged 16)	(Barbados Football Association) Pro Shottas
7	FW	Romario Harewood	17 August 1994 (aged 16)	(Barbados Football Association) St. John Sonnets
8	FW	Mark Grafton Williams	2 July 1994 (aged 16)	(Barbados Football Association) Kick Start
9	DF	Amal Keno Mayers	11 July 1994 (aged 16)	(Barbados Football Association) Kick Start
10	FW	Diquan Shaquille Adamson	10 February 1994 (aged 17)	(Barbados Football Association) Melbourne
11	FW	Jabarry Jesse Chandler	11 April 1994 (aged 16)	(Barbados Football Association) Barbados Soccer Academy
12	DF	Mark Antone Bushell	3 January 1994 (aged 17)	Free agent
13	DF	Jomo Harris	15 February 1995 (aged 15)	(Barbados Football Association) Barbados Soccer Academy
14	MF	Jhamel Kemar Hinds	9 February 1994 (aged 17)	Free agent
15	DF	Shane Shaquille Sealy	4 January 1994 (aged 17)	(Barbados Football Association) Kick Start
16	DF	Akeem Maloney	6 October 1994 (aged 16)	(Barbados Football Association) Pro Shottas
17	FW	Zari Andre Prescod	10 January 1994 (aged 17)	(Barbados Football Association) Pro Shottas
18	MF	Romario Orlando Watson	2 November 1994 (aged 16)	(Barbados Football Association) Parish Land
19	MF	Romario Orlando Bryan	1 February 1994 (aged 17)	Free agent
20	GK	Joshua Mark Hynam	30 December 1994 (aged 16)	(Barbados Football Association) Pro Shottas
22	GK	Ramon Hacketts	12 September 1994 (aged 16)	Free agent

=== Canada ===
Head coach: Sean Fleming

No.	Pos.	Player	Date of birth (age)	Club
1	GK	Maxime Crépeau	11 May 1994 (aged 16)	(Canadian Soccer Association) Académie Impact Montréal
2	MF	Samuel Piette	12 November 1994 (aged 16)	Free agent
3	DF	Adam Polakiewicz	8 March 1994 (aged 16)	(Canadian Soccer Association) Vancouver Whitecaps Academy
4	DF	Ismaïl Benomar	26 April 1994 (aged 16)	(Canadian Soccer Association) Académie Impact Montréal
5	DF	Daniel Stanese	21 January 1994 (aged 17)	(Canadian Soccer Association) Vancouver Whitecaps Academy
6	DF	Parker Seymour	11 April 1994 (aged 16)	(Canadian Soccer Association) Unionville Milliken SC
7	MF	Marco Lapenna	11 January 1994 (aged 17)	(Canadian Soccer Association) FC St-Léonard
8	MF	Bryce Alderson	5 February 1994 (aged 17)	(Canadian Soccer Association) Vancouver Whitecaps Academy
9	FW	Sadi Jalali	6 June 1995 (aged 15)	(Canadian Soccer Association) Edmonton Juventus SC
10	FW	Keven Alemán	25 March 1994 (aged 16)	Free agent
11	MF	Chris Nanco	15 February 1995 (aged 15)	Free agent
12	MF	Matteo Pasquotti	12 February 1994 (aged 17)	(Canadian Soccer Association) Vancouver Whitecaps Academy
13	DF	Luca Gasparotto	3 September 1995 (aged 15)	(Canadian Soccer Association) Ajax SC
14	MF	Shadrack Mmunga	1 January 1994 (aged 17)	Free agent
15	FW	Jordan Hamilton	17 March 1996 (aged 14)	(Canadian Soccer Association) Ajax SC
16	FW	Jay Chapman	1 January 1994 (aged 17)	Free agent
18	GK	Quillan Roberts	13 September 1994 (aged 16)	(Canadian Soccer Association) Brampton East SC
19	MF	Wesley Cain	21 February 1994 (aged 16)	Free agent
20	MF	Michael Petrasso	7 September 1995 (aged 15)	Free agent
21	MF	Dylan Carreiro	20 January 1995 (aged 16)	(Canadian Soccer Association) FC Northwest

=== Honduras ===
Head coach: Eugenio Emilio Umanzor

No.	Pos.	Player	Date of birth (age)	Club
1	GK	Allan Eduardo Torres	16 June 1994 (aged 16)	(National Autonomous Federation of Football of Honduras) CD Olimpia
2	DF	Tulio Edgardo Cruz	27 July 1995 (aged 15)	(National Autonomous Federation of Football of Honduras) CD Motagua
3	DF	Cesar Elias Yearwood	27 August 1995 (aged 15)	(National Autonomous Federation of Football of Honduras) CD Motagua
4	FW	Bryan Giovanni Rochez	1 January 1995 (aged 16)	(National Autonomous Federation of Football of Honduras) Real C.D. España
5	DF	Jeffri Gilberto Flores	4 August 1994 (aged 16)	(National Autonomous Federation of Football of Honduras) Real C.D. España
6	DF	Eder Yair Velasquez	4 January 1994 (aged 17)	(National Autonomous Federation of Football of Honduras) Real C.D. España
7	MF	Kelvin Nuñez	26 April 1994 (aged 16)	(National Autonomous Federation of Football of Honduras) Real C.D. España
8	MF	Manuel Jacinto Mejia	3 August 1994 (aged 16)	(National Autonomous Federation of Football of Honduras) C.D. Marathón
9	FW	Julio Javier Moncada	5 October 1994 (aged 16)	(National Autonomous Federation of Football of Honduras) CD Platense
10	FW	Oscar Eduardo Roque	13 March 1994 (aged 16)	(National Autonomous Federation of Football of Honduras) Real C.D. España
11	FW	David Alberto Carranza	8 December 1994 (aged 16)	(National Autonomous Federation of Football of Honduras) CD Motagua
12	GK	Roberto Josue Lopez	23 April 1995 (aged 15)	(National Autonomous Federation of Football of Honduras) Real C.D. España
13	DF	Jose Danery Barralaga	22 December 1994 (aged 16)	(National Autonomous Federation of Football of Honduras) Real Sociedad
14	MF	Tony Samuel Cerrato	19 May 1994 (aged 16)	(National Autonomous Federation of Football of Honduras) Municipal Valencia
15	MF	Carlos Leonel Valentin	2 August 1995 (aged 15)	(National Autonomous Federation of Football of Honduras) CD Olimpia
16	DF	Arnaldo Noel Alvarado	1 April 1994 (aged 16)	(National Autonomous Federation of Football of Honduras) CD Necaxa
17	MF	Ramon Alejandro Amador	23 January 1994 (aged 17)	(National Autonomous Federation of Football of Honduras) CD Motagua
18	FW	Carlos Roberto Andrade	27 May 1994 (aged 16)	(National Autonomous Federation of Football of Honduras) CD Olimpia
19	DF	Joshua Franshua Nieto	3 September 1994 (aged 16)	(National Autonomous Federation of Football of Honduras) CD Motagua
20	MF	Jose Alberto Escalante	29 May 1995 (aged 15)	(National Autonomous Federation of Football of Honduras) CD Olimpia
