= Vladimir Vujasinović (footballer) =

Serbian footballer

Personal information
- Full name: Vladimir Vujasinović
- Date of birth: 3 July 1989 (age 37)
- Place of birth: Bačka Palanka, SFR Yugoslavia
- Height: 1.93 m (6 ft 4 in)
- Position: Goalkeeper

Senior career*
Years	Team	Apps	(Gls)
2005–2008	Bačka Palanka	61	(0)
2008–2011	Big Bull Bačinci	14	(0)
2009–2011	→ Inđija (loan)	5	(0)
2011–2012	Radnički Šid	43	(0)
2013–2016	Bačka Palanka	17	(0)
2013–2014	→ Burlington (loan)		
2016	→ Milton (loan)	2	(0)
2017	Limón	0	(0)
2017	Municipal Liberia	11	(0)
2020	ČSK Čelarevo		
- * Club domestic league appearances and goals as of 23 May 2018

Vladimir Vujasinović (Serbian Cyrillic: Владимир Вујасиновић; born 3 July 1989) is a Serbian retired football goalkeeper.

== Playing career ==
Vujasinović began his career in 2005 with Bačka. In 2008, he signed with Big Bull Bačinci, and helped them win the Serbian League Vojvodina in 2010. In 2009, he was loaned to Inđija and won the Serbian First League. In 2011, he had a stint with Radnički Šid before returning to Bačka Palanka. In 2013, he was loaned out to Canada to play with Burlington SC of the Canadian Soccer League. In 2014, he was awarded the CSL Goalkeeper of the Year award. In 2016, he was loaned to Milton SC, and made his debut on October 7, 2016 in a match against York Region Shooters.

At the beginning of 2017, Vujasinović joined Limón F.C., only to move on to Municipal Liberia in summer 2017 since he remained second choice to Dexter Lewis in Limón. He had teamed up with compatriots Boris Balinović and Zoran Zec at Limón.
