= Limón Black Star =

Limón
- Full name: Limón Black Star
- Nickname: Limonenses
- Founded: 28 April 2022
- Dissolved: 12 August 2025
- Ground: Estadio Juan Gobán; Limón, Costa Rica
- Capacity: 3,000
- President: Cristian Williams
- League: Liga de Ascenso
- Apertura 2023: 10°

Limón Black Star was a Costa Rican association football team based in Limón. It was founded to compete in the Segunda División de Costa Rica, starting in the 2022–23 season.

The team originated in the aftermath of Limón's demise in 2021 due to financial irregularities. Local businessmen purchased the franchise of Marineros de Puntarenas to relocate the team to Limón.

Its name served as a homage to the Liberty Hall, commonly known as the Black Star Line Building. This hall, which was destroyed by fire in April 2016, was an important landmark of downtown Limón, and a symbol of Afro–Costa Ricans, particularly those within the Limón Province. Moreover, the team used the Pan-African colours in homage to the Rastafari movement, ditching the traditional green and white colors used by previous teams in the city such as Limonense and Limón.

In August 2025, the Costa Rican Football Federation revoked the professional licenses to both Turrialba and Limón Black Star, owing to financial irregularities in the license evaluation process. Four days later, the United States Department of the Treasury's Office of Foreign Assets Control added the team to the Specially Designated Nationals and Blocked Persons List due to its links to Celso Gamboa, former Minister of Security, and the drug-related investigation against him.

In late 2025, following the disappearance of Limón Black Star, a new successor team called Limón United was created.

== History ==
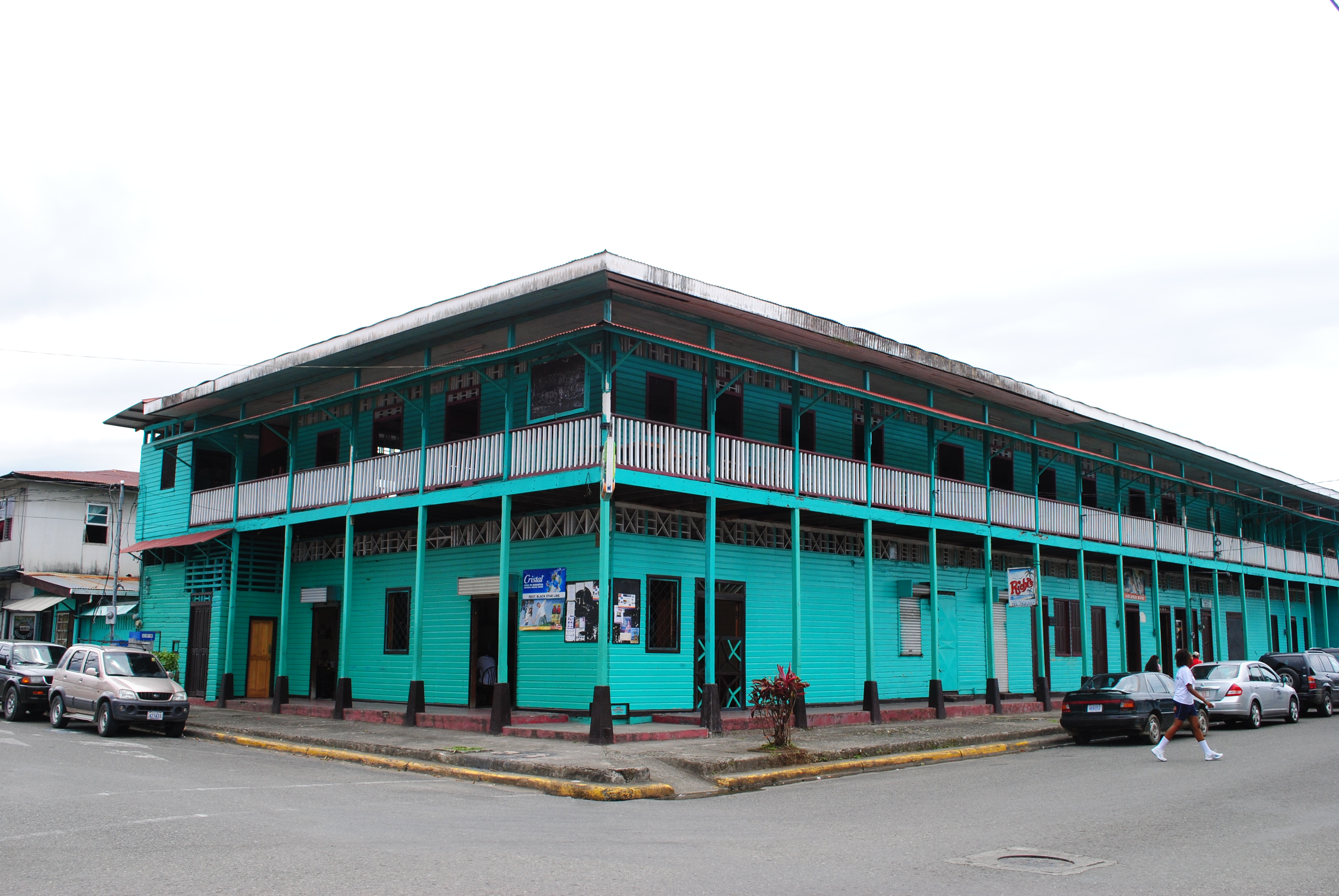
The club pays homage to Limón's Liberty Hall, also known as Black Star Line

During the first half of 2021, Limón entered "a series of bad decisions" that ultimately led to the team's relegation to the Liga de Ascenso. Despite efforts to nullify the 2020–21 Liga FPD season and avoid relegation, the club's situation worsened. The club had accumulated numerous delayed payments to the Costa Rican Social Security Fund, which prevented them from playing matches in the Liga de Ascenso. By January 2022, Limón had accumulated over ₡98 million in debts to the Security Fund. The club could not solve the situation and was officially relegated to the Tercera Division de Costa Rica, losing its category as a professional team.

Immediately after the team's disappearance, former administrative manager Celso Gamboa announced his intentions of acquiring the franchise of Marineros de Puntarenas, a team based in Puntarenas that struggled in coexisting with the more traditional Puntarenas F.C. On 28 April 2022, the acquisition of Marineros was officially confirmed, and the team was renamed to Limón Black Star. The name is an allusion of the Liberty Hall, also known as the Black Star Line, a prominent landmark in downtown Limón and a symbol of Afro-Costa Rican culture, which was destroyed by a fire in April 2016.

On 25 May 2022, the new team's administration announced the badge and colours, adopting the Pan-African colouring due to the Rastafari movement and the city's historical ties with the Afro-Caribbean people.

=== Sanctions ===
On 28 May 2025, the President of Costa Rica Rodrigo Chaves signed a constitutional reform to allow the extradition of Costa Rican nationals accused of drug trafficking and terrorism. A month later, former Minister of Security Celso Gamboa was arrested by the Judicial Investigation Department (OIJ) per request of the United States' Drug Enforcement Administration (DEA), awaiting extradition. According to a DEA's report, Gamboa acted as a regional leader for Mexico's Gulf Cartel and its operations in drug trafficking between Colombia, Central America, Mexico, and the United States.

Gamboa's arrest left Costa Rican news outlets questioning his relationship with Limón Black Star. On 24 June 2025, La Teja's Sergio Alvarado inquired Black Star's president Cristian Williams, who stated the arrest was "a personal issue for Gamboa" and that he had no involvement with the club. Skeptical about Williams' response, ElMundoCR's Ferlin Fuentes recalled a text that Williams himself posted on social media in 2022, shortly after the club's foundation. The text stated he and Gamboa promised the people of Limón that they will have a football team back in the town. Two days later, La Teja's Alejandra Morales indicated that, according to the DEA's report, Celso Gamboa and a man named Edwin Vega López (known as "Pecho de Rata") used a professional team based in Limón for money laundering. She also pointed that the only professional team in Limón was Black Star.

In July 2025, the Costa Rican Football Federation opened an investigation on two Segunda División teams, one of them being Limón Black Star, because of irregularities in financial proceedings during the license granting process for the 2025–26 season. A month later, amidst a wave of license suspension of Costa Rican teams, the Federation revoked Black Star's license, relegating the team to amateur status. All appealings requested by the clubs were dismissed.

Four days after having its professional license revoked, the team was added to the Specially Designated Nationals and Blocked Persons List by the United States Department of the Treasury's Office of Foreign Assets Control due to its links with Celso Gamboa.

In June 2026, further investigations by the OIJ revealed that a former Black Star player, Elking Scoby, played a significant role in Gamboa and Vega López's drug-trafficking organization. Scoby was described by the Investigation Department as a "relevant collaborator", serving in "operational support regarding storage, transportation, and distribution of narcotic substances".

== Stadium ==
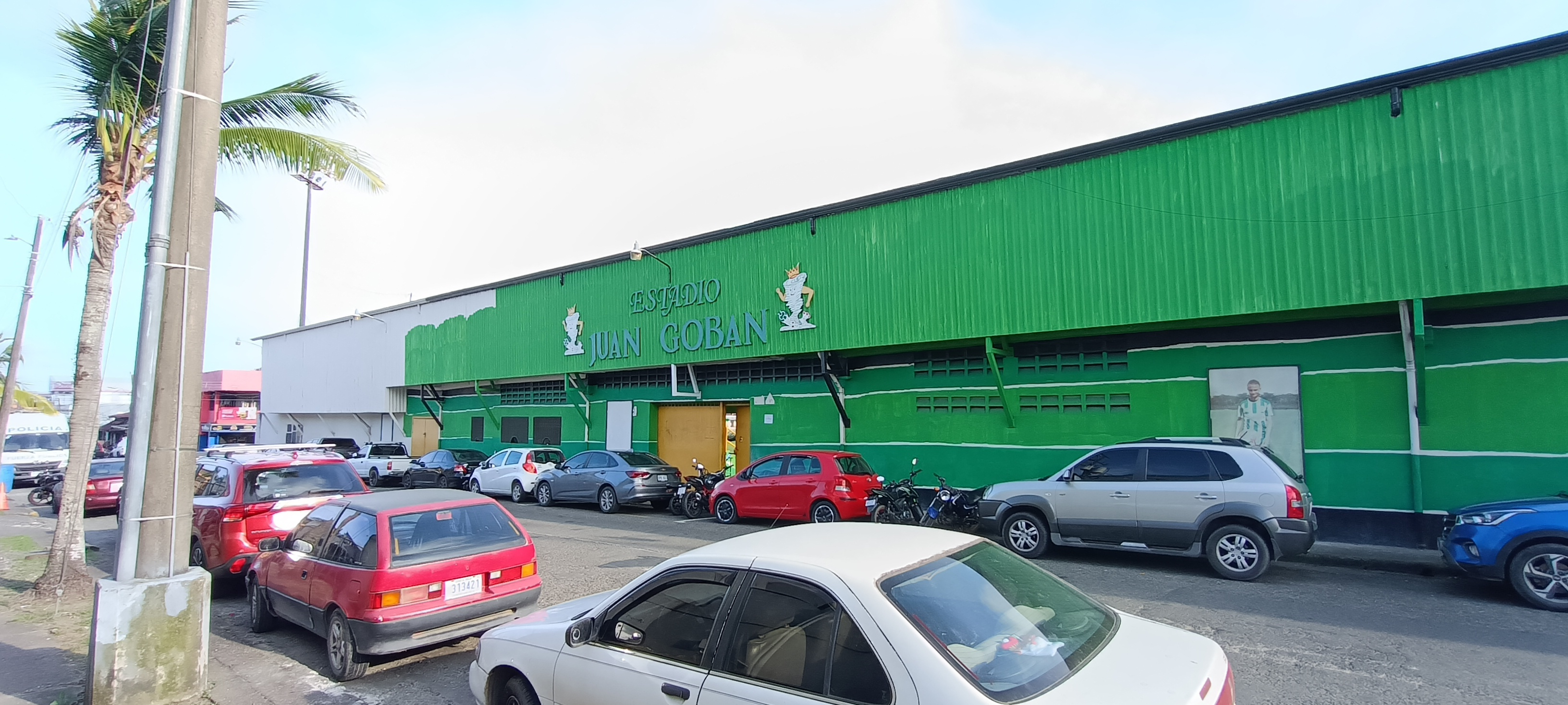
Estadio Juan Gobán

The Juan Gobán Stadium is a soccer stadium located in Limón, head of the province of the same name, on the Caribbean coast of Costa Rica.

In February 2010, a synthetic turf measuring 91 meters long by 72 meters wide was installed. The following reforms included the construction of boxes, press areas, complete remodeling of the dressing rooms and installation of artificial lighting.

In September 2010, the Juan Gobán stadium was reopened after a series of renovations that involved a year and a half of work, in addition to an investment of close to $1 million, 800 thousand dollars.

Among the novelties is the expansion of the dressing room area from two to four, a weight room, a doping room, laundry, four sodas, two offices, the installation of 20 restrooms and a VIP area for 220 people. The roof of the shadow grandstand was also replaced.

In general, the capacity of the redoubt was expanded to 2,349 people. The stadium was home to the Limon F.C. of the First Division of Costa Rica from 2010 to 2020.

== Current squad ==
As of 23 July 2023.

Note: Flags indicate national team as defined under FIFA eligibility rules; some limited exceptions apply. Players may hold more than one non-FIFA nationality.

No.	Pos.	Nation	Player
—	GK	CRC	Ricardo Montenegro
—	GK	CRC	José Velázquez
—	GK	CRC	Darién Hidalgo
—	DF	CRC	Shain Brown
—	DF	CRC	Darlon Level
—	DF	CRC	Jonaiker Gamboa
—	DF	CRC	Carlos Quirós
—	DF	CRC	Adrián Chévez
—	DF	CRC	Elking Scoby
—	DF	CRC	Sheldon Harris
—	DF	CRC	Landon Calderón
—	DF	CRC	Shawmark Hodgson
—	MF	CRC	Johnny Gordon
—	MF	CRC	José Torres
—	MF	CRC	Jeyson Powell
—	MF	CRC	Jurguen Esquivel

No.	Pos.	Nation	Player
—	MF	CRC	Guillermo Leal
—	MF	CRC	Alexander Espinoza
—	MF	CRC	Kane Ujueta
—	MF	CRC	Justin Ramírez
—	MF	CRC	Keymark Davis
—	MF	CRC	Deanmark Brumley
—	MF	CRC	Cristian Flores
—	MF	CRC	Kwame Bayles
—	MF	CRC	Kedrish Picado
—	MF	CRC	Johnny Myrie
—	FW	CRC	Froylán Alfaro
—	FW	CRC	Darnell Barthley
—	FW	CRC	Jonedzel López
—	FW	CRC	Slahuko Jawnyj
—	FW	CRC	Brandon Solís
—	FW	CRC	Kendal Wilson

== Personnel ==
The initial staff members were announced on 28 April 2022. Aside from the members listed below, Carlos Watson and Juan Cayasso have also been mentioned as collaborators.

The staff as of 23 July 2023 was as follows:

=== Current technical staff ===
Position	Staff
Head coach	(Costa Rica) Marvin Solano
Assistant coach	(Costa Rica) Erick Ortiz
Assistant coach	(Costa Rica) Erick Scott
Fitness coach	(Costa Rica) José Villachica
Goalkeeping coach	(Costa Rica) Dexter Lewis
Equipment manager	(Costa Rica) Carlos Araica
Massage therapist	(Costa Rica) Fernando Ford
Physical therapist	(Costa Rica) Beatriz Álvarez

=== Management ===
Position	Staff
President	(Costa Rica) Cristian Williams
Sporting director	(Costa Rica) Juan Cayasso

== See also ==
- Limón F.C.
- A.D. Limonense
