= Edder =

Edder is a given name. Notable people with the name include:

- Edder Delgado (born 1986), Honduran international footballer
- Edder Farías (born 1988), Venezuelan footballer
- Edder Fuertes (born 1992), Ecuadorian footballer
- Edder Nelson (born 1986), Costa Rican football player
- Edder Pérez (born 1983), Venezuelan footballer
- Edder Vaca (born 1985), Ecuadorian footballer

== See also ==
- Best Day Edder
