= Derrick Johnson (footballer) =

Costa Rican footballer (born 1989)

Personal information
- Full name: Derrick George Johnson Mullins
- Date of birth: July 28, 1989 (age 37)
- Place of birth: Puerto Limón, Costa Rica
- Height: 1.94 m (6 ft 4 1/2 in)
- Position: Defender

Team information
- Current team: Limón
- Number: 30

Youth career
- 2009–2011: Limón

Senior career*
Years	Team	Apps	(Gls)
2011–2012	Limón	39	(1)
2012–2013	Herediano	23	(0)
2013–2014	Siquirreña		
2014	Caribe Sur		
2015–	Limón		

International career^{‡}
2009–2010	Costa Rica U20	1	(0)
- * Club domestic league appearances and goals as of 15:56, 25 March 2012 (UTC) ‡ National team caps and goals as of 15:56, 25 March 2012 (UTC)

Derrick George Johnson Mullins (born July 28, 1989) is a Costa Rican professional footballer who currently plays as a defender for Costa Rican Primera Division side Limón.

== Club career ==
Before signing with Limón in 2011, Johnson had considered signing with Guatemalan side Comunicaciones and Major League Soccer. He moved to Herediano in 2012 and would play 23 league matches for them.

In summer 2013, Herediano sent him on loan to Uruguay de Coronado but in August 2013 Johnson left Herediano himself to join second division Siquirreña.
