= Edder Nelson =

Costa Rican footballer (born 1986)

Personal information
- Full name: Edder Nelson Martin
- Date of birth: 26 June 1986 (age 40)
- Place of birth: Limón, Costa Rica
- Height: 1.69 m (5 ft 6 1/2 in)
- Positions: Right midfielder; right back

Team information
- Current team: Limón Black Star
- Number: 14

Youth career
- Saprissa

Senior career*
Years	Team	Apps	(Gls)
2009–2011	Municipal Grecia		
2011–2012	Puntarenas	32	(3)
2012	→ Senica (loan)	0	(0)
2012–2013	Cartaginés	21	(0)
2013	→ Saprissa (loan)	7	(0)
2013–2014	Pérez Zeledón	17	(0)
2014–2015	Limón	40	(1)
2015–2016	Herediano	22	(0)
2016	→ Pérez Zeledón (loan)	13	(0)
2016–2017	Milwaukee Wave (indoor)	12	(3)
2017–2018	UCR	34	(1)
2018–2019	Limón	57	(3)
2020–	Limón Black Star	14	(1)

International career
2011	Costa Rica	1	(0)
- * Club domestic league appearances and goals as of 19:33, 28 May 2020 (UTC)

Edder Nelson Martin (born 26 June 1986 in Limón) is a Costa Rican football player who currently plays for Limón Black Star.

== Club career ==
He played the 2009 second division final for Municipal Grecia and later played for Puntarenas. In January 2012, Nelson signed a 6-month contract with Slovak side Senica but he did not pass a medical.

=== Cartaginés ===
On May 29, 2012, Nelson signed a 1-year long contract with Cartaginés. Nelson made his debut for Cartaginés in the opening match in the Winter 2012, against Belén Siglo XXI playing the whole game. On 7 August, Nelson made assistance for the tie against Limón in Cartaginés 1–2 victory, after Hansell Arauz recovered the ball in 3/4 of field, passes to Nelson, running and leaves two opponents to make an assistance to Erick Ponce. On 28 October, Nelson created a play of a wall with Randall Alvarado, made attendance goal to Paolo Jimenez, in the game who lost Cartaginés 1–3 against C.D. Saprissa. On 7 November, he made a goal assisted by Eduardo Valverde in the game who lost Cartaginés 2–3 against C.S. Herediano.

In January 2013, Nelson quit Cartaginés because he did not want to play out of his favoured defensive position and joined Saprissa on loan for a year. He moved to Pérez Zeledón only a few months later.

== International career ==
He made his debut on 11 December 2012 in a friendly match against Cuba in place of Marco Ureña at minute 46.

== Career statistics ==
Season	Club	Division	League		Cup		Concachampions		Total	
Season	Club	Division	Apps	Goals	Apps	Goals	Apps	Goals	Apps	Goals
2012–13	Cartaginés	Primera División	21	0	-	-	-	-	21	0
Career Total			21	0	-	-	-	-	21	0
