= Igor Lozo =

Croatian footballer (born 1984)

Personal information
- Date of birth: 2 March 1984 (age 42)
- Place of birth: Split, SR Croatia, SFR Yugoslavia
- Height: 1.87 m (6 ft 2 in)
- Position: Defender

Youth career
- Hajduk Split

Senior career*
Years	Team	Apps	(Gls)
2003–2005	Hajduk Split	0	(0)
2003–2004	→ Šibenik (loan)	23	(0)
2004–2005	→ Mosor (loan)	29	(2)
2005–2007	Istra	47	(1)
2007–2008	Chornomorets Odesa	1	(0)
2008–2009	Junak Sinj	20	(2)
2009–2010	Međimurje	6	(0)
2010–2011	Imotski		
2011–2012	Gol Gohar		
2012–2013	Val		
2013–2014	Dugopolje	25	(1)
2014–	Val		

International career^{‡}
2005–2006	Croatia U21	4	(0)
- * Club domestic league appearances and goals as of 21:28, 9 February 2010 (UTC) ‡ National team caps and goals as of 21:28, 9 February 2010 (UTC)

Igor Lozo (born 2 March 1984) is a Croatian football player playing for NK Međimurje. He previously played for Chornomorets Odesa.
