= Boureima Ouattara =

Burkinabé footballer

Personal information
- Date of birth: 13 January 1984 (age 42)
- Height: 1.87 m (6 ft 2 in)
- Position: Centre-back

Senior career*
Years	Team	Apps	(Gls)
2000–2003	ASF Bobo Dioulasso		
2003–2006	Strømsgodset	70	(4)
2007	ASF Bobo Dioulasso		
2007–2008	CA Bastia	12	(0)
2008–2009	ASF Bobo Dioulasso		

International career
2001–2005	Burkina Faso	9	(0)
- * Club domestic league appearances and goals

Boureima Ouattara (born 13 January 1984) is a Burkinabe former professional footballer who played as a centre-back for ASF Bobo Dioulasso, Strømsgodset Toppfotball, and CA Bastia.

He was part of the Burkinabé 2002 African Nations Cup team, which finished bottom of group B in the first round of competition, thus failing to secure qualification for the quarter-finals. He also featured at the 2003 FIFA World Youth Championship.
