= Lucas Molina =

Argentine footballer (1984–2004)

Personal information
- Date of birth: 30 March 1984
- Place of birth: Buenos Aires, Argentina
- Date of death: 28 November 2004 (aged 20)
- Place of death: Buenos Aires, Argentina
- Height: 1.77 m (5 ft 10 in)
- Position: Goalkeeper

Youth career
- 1996–2003: Independiente

Senior career*
Years	Team	Apps	(Gls)
2003–2004	Independiente	5	(0)

International career
2001	Argentina U17	6	(0)
2003	Argentina U20		
- * Club domestic league appearances and goals

Lucas Damián Molina (30 March 1984 – 28 November 2004) was an Argentine professional footballer who played as a goalkeeper for Independiente.

== Career ==
Born in Buenos Aires, Molina made his professional debut for Independiente in the Argentine Primera División against Vélez Sarsfield on 30 October 2003. He came into the match as a late-substitute for Damián Albil. The match ended 1–0 in favor of Vélez Sarsfield.

== International ==
Molina had played for Argentina at both under-17 and under-20 levels.

== Death ==
On 28 November 2004 Molina died in his sleep from a heart attack. He was taken to the emergency room after his girlfriend noticed his asymmetrical breathing patterns. Despite best efforts, Molina was confirmed dead by 9 am.
