= Lassana Diallo =

Malian football player

Personal information
- Full name: Ibrahima Lassana Diallo
- Date of birth: 24 June 1984 (age 42)
- Place of birth: Bamako, Mali
- Height: 1.77 m (5 ft 10 in)
- Position: Striker

Senior career*
Years	Team	Apps	(Gls)
2002–2003	Djoliba AC	37	(3)
2003–2005	Châteauroux	7	(0)
2006–2009	Stade Malien		
2009–2013	Djoliba AC		
2013–2015	AS Bakaridjan		

International career
2001–2003	Mali U-17	14	(5)
2007	Mali	1	(1)
- * Club domestic league appearances and goals

Ibrahima Lassana Diallo (born 24 June 1984) is a Malian former professional footballer who played as a striker.

== Club career ==
Born in Bamako, Diallo began his career with Djoliba Athletic Club before moving to LB Châteauroux in 2003. In 2006 he returned to Mali and signed a contract with Stade Malien. In August 2007 went on trial with Algerian club MC Alger but did not do enough to impress the coach.

== International career ==
Diallo was part of the Mali U-17 national team which finished third in the group stage of 2001 FIFA U-17 World Championship. He played his first game for the Mali senior team on 9 July 2007 against Sierra Leone.
