= Sulaiman Al-Shukaili =

Omani footballer (born 1984)

Personal information
- Full name: Sulaiman Said Saif Al-Shukaili
- Date of birth: 29 October 1984 (age 42)
- Place of birth: Oman
- Position: Defender

Team information
- Current team: Al-Salmiya

Senior career*
| Years | Team | Apps | (Gls) |
| –2006 | Muscat | ? | (1) |
| 2006–2008 | Al-Salmiya | ? | (0) |
| 2008–2011 | Muscat | | |
| 2011–2018 | Fanja | | |

International career
| 2003–2008 | Oman | 3 | (0) |
- * Club domestic league appearances and goals

Sulaiman Said Saif Al-Shukaili (Arabic: سليمان سعيد سيف الشكيلي; born 29 October 1984), commonly known as Sulaiman Al-Shukaili, is an Omani footballer who plays for Muscat Club in the Oman First Division League.

== Club career statistics ==
| Club | Season | Division | League | | Cup | | Continental | | Other | | Total | |
| Club | Season | Division | Apps | Goals | Apps | Goals | Apps | Goals | Apps | Goals | Apps | Goals |
|---|---|---|---|---|---|---|---|---|---|---|---|---|
| Muscat | 2005–06 | Omani League | - | 1 | - | 0 | 0 | 0 | - | 0 | - | 1 |
| Muscat | Total | | - | 1 | - | 0 | 0 | 0 | - | 0 | - | 1 |
| Career total | | | - | 1 | - | 0 | 0 | 0 | - | 0 | - | 1 |

== International career ==
Sulaiman was selected for the Oman national football team for the first time in 2006. He has represented the national team in the 2007 AFC Asian Cup qualification, the 2007 AFC Asian Cup and the 2011 AFC Asian Cup qualification

He also played at the 2001 FIFA U-17 World Championship in Trinidad and Tobago.
