= Alhassane Touré =

Malian footballer

Personal information
- Full name: Alhassane Ousmane Touré
- Date of birth: February 5, 1984 (age 42)
- Place of birth: Baguinéda; Mali
- Height: 1.84 m (6 ft 0 in)

Youth career
- CSK

Senior career*
Years	Team	Apps	(Gls)
2001–2003	Djoliba	39	(13)
2003–2004	FC Schaffhausen	7	(0)
2004–2005	FC Bulle	1	(0)
2005–2008	La Chaux-de-Fonds	79	(13)
2008–2009	FC Bulle	13	(1)
2009–2010	FC Serrières	2	(0)
2010–	FC Portalban/Gletterens	47	(33)
2013	→ FC Bulle (loan)	10	(4)

International career^{‡}
2001–2002	Mali U-17	3	(2)
2002–2003	Mali U-18	9	(3)
2003–2004	Mali U-20	16	(8)
2004–2008	Mali	17	(3)
- * Club domestic league appearances and goals as of April 7, 2014 ‡ National team caps and goals as of April 7, 2014

Alhassane Ousmane Touré (born 5 February 1984 in Baguinéda ) is a Malian footballer, who currently plays for FC La Chaux-de-Fonds.

== Career ==
Touré started his career in the Centre Salif Keita and played from 2001 until 2003 for Djoliba AC, who won the Malien Premiere Division and the Malien Cup. He spent most of his career in Switzerland, he played during his career 7 games in the Swiss Super League for FC Schaffhausen and 78 games in the Challenge League for FC Bulle, respectively FC La Chaux-de-Fonds. Since 2009 played in the 2. Liga interregional for FC Serrières, FC Portalban/Gletterens and one year 2013 on loan from Portalban, for FC Bulle.

== International career ==
Touré capped for the Mali U-20 team at the 2003 FIFA World Youth Championship. He played also from 2004 to 2008 in 17 official FIFA games for the Mali national football team.
