= Ndala Ibrahim =

Nigerian footballer

Personal information
- Full name: Andella Ibrahim
- Date of birth: 2 May 1985 (age 41)
- Place of birth: Lokoja, Nigeria
- Height: 1.76 m (5 ft 9 in)
- Position: Defender

Team information
- Current team: Mighty Jets F.C.

Senior career*
Years	Team	Apps	(Gls)
2003–2004	Wikki Tourists F.C.		
2004–2005	Maccabi Tel Aviv	4	(0)
2005	→ Beitar Jerusalem (loan)	4	(0)
2005	Dolphins F.C.		
2006–2008	Wikki Tourists F.C.		
2008–2010	Sunshine Stars F.C.		
2010–2011	Gombe United F.C.		
2011	Sharks F.C.		
2011	Ocean Boys F.C.		
2013–2015	Niger Tornadoes F.C.		
2015–2017	Jigawa Golden Stars F.C.		

International career
2001	Nigeria U-17	6	(0)
- * Club domestic league appearances and goals

Andella Ibrahim (born 2 May 1985 in Lokoja, Kogi State) is a Nigerian footballer.

== Career ==
He played the 2012 season with Niger Tornadoes F.C. and represented his team as team captain. The defender left Jigawa Golden Stars F.C. in March 2013 and signed for Kaduna United F.C.

=== International ===
Ibrahim represented his country Nigeria at 2001 FIFA U-17 World Championship in Trinidad and Tobago.
