= Jedwin Lester =

Costa Rican footballer (born 2002)

Personal information
- Full name: Jedwin Johao Lester Arroyo
- Date of birth: 21 August 2002 (age 24)
- Place of birth: San José, Costa Rica
- Position: Midfielder

Team information
- Current team: AD Guanacasteca

Senior career*
Years	Team	Apps	(Gls)
2020–2021	Saprissa	6	(0)
- * Club domestic league appearances and goals as of 12:23, 4 May 2021 (UTC)

Jedwin Johao Lester Arroyo (born 21 August 2002) is a Costa Rican footballer who currently plays as a midfielder for AD Guanacasteca.

== Career statistics ==
=== Club ===
As of 14 September 2020.

Club	Season	League			Cup		Continental		Other		Total	
Club	Season	Division	Apps	Goals	Apps	Goals	Apps	Goals	Apps	Goals	Apps	Goals
Saprissa	2020–21	Liga FPD	2	0	0	0	0	0	1 (Note: Appearances in the Supercopa de Costa Rica)	0	3	0
Career total			2	0	0	0	0	0	1	0	3	0
