= Dexter Lewis =

Costa Rican footballer (born 1981)

Personal information
- Full name: Dexter Alberto Lewis Bonilla
- Date of birth: February 2, 1981 (age 45)
- Place of birth: Cahuita de Talamanca, Costa Rica
- Height: 1.80 m (5 ft 11 in)
- Position: Goalkeeper

Team information
- Current team: Limon
- Number: 31

Senior career*
Years	Team	Apps	(Gls)
- Sagrada Familia
2000–2002	Limonense		
2003–2004	Cartaginés		
2004	Ramonense		
2005–2010	Pérez Zeledón	108	(0)
2010–2012	Limón	56	(0)
2012–2015	Alajuelense	23	(1)
2015–2016	Limon	12	(0)
2015–2016	Perez Zeledon	0	(0)
2016––	Limon	143	(0)

International career
2007–	Costa Rica	2	(0)
- * Club domestic league appearances and goals as of January 24, 2021

Dexter Lewis (born February 2, 1981) is a Costa Rican professional football goalkeeper playing for Limon.

== Club career ==
Lewis made his professional debut with second division side Sagrada Familia and in the Primera División on 7 May 2000 for Limonense against San Carlos. He also played for Cartaginés and Ramonense before joining Pérez Zeledón.

On March 8, 2015, Lewis scored his first goal against As Puma.

== International career ==
Lewis has made two appearances for the Costa Rica national football team, his debut coming in a friendly against New Zealand on March 24, 2007.
