= Julio Fuller =

Costa Rican footballer (1956–2019)

Personal information
- Full name: Julio Alfonso Fuller McKenzie
- Date of birth: 6 July 1956
- Place of birth: Limón, Costa Rica
- Date of death: 21 February 2019 (aged 62)
- Position: Defender

Youth career
- Estrella Roja

Senior career*
| Years | Team | Apps | (Gls) |
| 1974–1979 | Limonense | | |
| 1980–1982 | Cartaginés | | |
| 1983–1995 | Limonense | | |
| Total | | 684 | (25) |

International career
| 1980 | Costa Rica | 3 | (0) |
- * Club domestic league appearances and goals

Julio Alfonso Fuller McKenzie (6 July 1956 – 21 February 2019) was a Costa Rican football defender who played 20 seasons in the Costa Rican Primera División.

== Club career ==
Born in Limón, Fuller began playing football in the youth team of local club Estrella Roja. In 1974, he joined Limonense, immediately helping the club reach the Primera División. Fuller played as a central defender for Limón from 1975 to 1979, and after a spell with Cartaginés, again from 1983 to 1995. He made his Primera debut against Herediano on 11 May 1975, and played his last Primera match against Alajuelense on 9 April 1995.

Fuller held the record as the most-capped player in the Primera División with 684 appearances until Marvin Obando surpassed his record in 2000.

== International career ==
Fuller made three appearances for the Costa Rica national football team during the 1982 FIFA World Cup qualifiers.

== Personal life ==
Fuller was a widower and had 4 children.
