= Júnior Carioca =

Brazilian footballer

Junior Carioca
Personal information
- Full name: José António de Miranda da Silva Júnior
- Date of birth: April 27, 1985 (age 41)
- Place of birth: Rio de Janeiro, Brazil
- Position: Midfielder

Senior career*
Years	Team	Apps	(Gls)
2003–2007	Flamengo	53	(2)
2008–2010	Tombense	0	(0)
2008	→ Grêmio (loan)	0	(0)
2009	→ Atlético Mineiro (loan)	0	(0)
2009	→ Náutico (loan)	3	(0)
2010	→ Duque de Caxias (loan)	0	(0)
- * Club domestic league appearances and goals

José António de Miranda da Silva Júnior (born April 27, 1985, in Rio de Janeiro), or simply Júnior Carioca, is a Brazilian football midfielder.

== Career ==
Júnior Carioca signed a contract with Náutico at the start of Campeonato Brasileiro Série A in May. However, he was released in July 2009.

== Honours ==
- Flamengo
  - Brazilian Cup: 2006
