= Jake Beckford =

Costa Rican footballer (born 1994)

Personal information
- Full name: Jake Gerardo Beckford Edwards
- Date of birth: 31 July 1994 (age 32)
- Place of birth: San José, Costa Rica
- Height: 1.80 m (5 ft 11 in)
- Position: Midfielder

Team information
- Current team: Escorpiones de Belén

Youth career
- Deportivo Saprissa
- Carolina Railhawks

Senior career*
Years	Team	Apps	(Gls)
2013–2014	Carolina Railhawks	2	(0)
2014–2015	Limón	24	(1)
2015–2016	Uruguay de Coronado	8	(0)
2016–2017	San Carlos	18	(1)
2017–2019	Alajuelense	20	(1)
2019	→ UCR (loan)	8	(0)
2019–2020	Pérez Zeledón	26	(0)
2020–2021	Fútbol Consultants		
2021	Limón		
2021	Municipal Liberia		
2022–2023	Carmelita		
2023	Guadalupe		
2024–	Escorpiones de Belén		

International career
2011	Costa Rica U17	5	(0)
- * Club domestic league appearances and goals as of 10 August 2020

Jake Gerardo Beckford Edwards (born 31 July 1994) is a Costa Rican professional footballer who plays as a midfielder for Escorpiones de Belén.

== Club career ==
Born in Costa Rica, Beckford made his debut for the Carolina Railhawks of the North American Soccer League on 29 June 2013 against the Atlanta Silverbacks in which he came on in the 88th minute for César Elizondo as Carolina drew the match 1–1. Just before his debut however, Beckford had already drawn a red card on 8 June 2013 in the Railhawks 2–1 victory over the Tampa Bay Rowdies in which he was red carded in the 96th minute, along with Tampa Bay player, Shane Hill, despite not coming off the bench in that game after there was a mini-brawl on the pitch when the match ended.

In June 2014, Beckford joined Limón.

== International ==
Beckford has represented his country at the under-17 for Costa Rica during the 2011 CONCACAF U-17 Championship.

== Career statistics ==
As of 27 July 2013

Club	Season	League		League Cup		Domestic Cup		CONCACAF		Total	
Club	Season	Apps	Goals	Apps	Goals	Apps	Goals	Apps	Goals	Apps	Goals
Carolina Railhawks	2013	2	0	0	0	0	0	0	0	2	0
Career total		2	0	0	0	0	0	0	0	2	0
