= Carlos Toppings =

Costa Rican footballer (1953–2007)

Personal information
- Full name: Carlos Nicanor Toppings Toppings
- Date of birth: 7 April 1953
- Place of birth: Limón, Costa Rica
- Date of death: 24 August 2007 (aged 54)
- Place of death: San José, Costa Rica
- Position: Defender

Senior career*
Years	Team	Apps	(Gls)
1974–1978	Limonense		
1978–1983	Municipal Puntarenas		
1984	Herediano		
1985–1987	Municipal Puntarenas		
1987	San Carlos		

International career
1979–1984	Costa Rica	32	(2)
- * Club domestic league appearances and goals

Carlos Nicanor Toppings Toppings (7 April 1953 – 24 August 2007) was a Costa Rican professional footballer.

== Club career ==
Born in the Caribbean coastal town Limón, Toppings made his professional debut in 1974 for hometown club Limonense and had a lengthy spell at Municipal Puntarenas. He also had short stints at Herediano and San Carlos.

Toppings won the 1986 Primera Division de Costa Rica title with Puntarenas.

== International career ==
Toppings made 32 appearances for the full Costa Rica national football team from 1979 to 1984. He also played at the 1980 and 1984 Olympic Games.

== Retirement and death ==
After retiring as a player he worked at a customs agency in Limón harbour. He was unmarried but had a daughter, Violeta, and died in San José, Costa Rica, aged 54 due to a lung problem.
