= Diego Agüero =

Paraguayan footballer (born 1984)

Personal information
- Full name: Diego Daniel Agüero Noguera
- Date of birth: 10 February 1984 (age 42)
- Place of birth: Areguá, Paraguay
- Position: Midfielder

Senior career*
Years	Team	Apps	(Gls)
2000–2005	Independiente FBC		
2005	Sport Colombia		
2006	Deportes Antofagasta	8	(1)
2010	Sportivo Trinidense		
2010	ESPOLI	3	(0)
2011	Sportivo Luqueño		

International career
2001	Paraguay	1	(0)
- * Club domestic league appearances and goals

Diego Daniel Agüero Noguera (born 10 February 1984) is a Paraguayan former footballer who played as a midfielder.

== Teams ==
- (Paraguay) Independiente FBC 2000–2005
- (Paraguay) Sport Colombia 2005
- (Chile) Deportes Antofagasta 2006
- (Paraguay) Sportivo Trinidense 2010
- (Ecuador) ESPOLI 2010
- (Paraguay) Sportivo Luqueño 2011

== International ==
- Paraguay U17 2001
