= Kraesher Mooke =

Costa Rican footballer (born 1984)

Personal information
- Full name: Kraesher Mooke Watson
- Date of birth: 13 March 1984 (age 42)
- Place of birth: Limón, Costa Rica
- Height: 1.72 m (5 ft 7 1/2 in)
- Position: Midfielder

Senior career*
Years	Team	Apps	(Gls)
2001–2002	Limón		
2002–2003	Saprissa		
2003	River Plate (Montevideo)		
2003–2004	Santa Barbara		
2004–2006	Saprissa		
2006–2007	Santos de Guápiles		
2007–2009	Brujas		
2009–2010	→ Santos de Guápiles (loan)	11	(0)
2010–2011	Limón	12	(0)
2011–2013	Saprissa	6	(0)
- * Club domestic league appearances and goals

Kraesher Mooke Watson (born 13 March 1984) is a Costa Rican professional football player. He usually plays as left midfielder. He is well known for his control of the ball on the field and for his participation in the Costa Rican minor leagues.

== Club career ==
Watson first entered the Costa Rican Primera División during the 2001–2002 season with Asociacion Deportiva Limonense, a fairly new and inexperienced team to the league. On the 2002–2003 season he was signed by Saprissa where he played as the major defensive midfielder. He then had a short stint in the Primera División Uruguaya with Club Atlético River Plate but returned to play for Santa Barbara, Saprissa and Santos de Guápiles before joining Brujas He returned to hometown club Limón in 2010.

Mooke was sidelined for 6 months after tearing cruciate ligaments in January 2012 while playing with Saprissa. On 18 October 2012 he was permanently removed from Saprissa due to an alleged indiscipline.

== International career ==
Mooke played in the 2001 FIFA U-17 World Championship held in Trinidad and Tobago.
