= Silvio Cavrić =

Croatian footballer

Personal information
- Date of birth: 10 July 1985 (age 41)
- Place of birth: Sisak, SR Croatia, SFR Yugoslavia
- Height: 1.74 m (5 ft 8 1/2 in)
- Positions: Defender; midfielder

Youth career
- Metalac Sisak
- Segesta
- Dinamo Zagreb

Senior career*
Years	Team	Apps	(Gls)
2003–2006	Dinamo Zagreb		
2003–2004	→ Croatia Sesvete (loan)		
2004–2005	→ Međimurje (loan)	9	(0)
2005–2006	→ Segesta (loan)		
2006	→ Istra Pula (loan)	11	(0)
2006–2010	Inter Zaprešić	59	(2)
2010–2011	Laçi	16	(2)

International career^{‡}
2001	Croatia U15	3	(0)
2001	Croatia U16	3	(0)
2001	Croatia U17	13	(0)
2003	Croatia U18	7	(0)
2003–2004	Croatia U19	11	(1)
2004	Croatia U20	3	(0)
2005	Croatia U21	1	(0)
- * Club domestic league appearances and goals as of 21:28, 24 October 2009 (UTC) ‡ National team caps and goals as of 21:28, 24 October 2009 (UTC)

Silvio Cavrić (born 10 July 1985) is a Croatian footballer who most recently played as a defender or defensive midfielder for Albanian Superliga club KF Laçi.

== Club career ==
Cavrić spent most of his professional career under contract with Dinamo Zagreb who had loaned him to a number of clubs during his career, including NK Croatia Sesvete, NK Međimurje, HNK Segesta, NK Istra, and most recently, NK Inter Zaprešić.

== International career ==
He was also capped 41 times for Croatia's youth teams at various age levels between 2001 and 2005 and was a first-team member of the squad which won third place at the 2001 European Under-16 Championship. He also appeared in all three Croatia's matches at the 2001 Under-17 World Cup.
