= Marko Bašić (footballer, born 1984) =

Croatian footballer

Personal information
- Full name: Marko Bašić
- Date of birth: 13 September 1984 (age 42)
- Place of birth: SR Croatia, SFR Yugoslavia (today's Croatia)
- Height: 1.85 m (6 ft 1 in)
- Position: Defender

Senior career*
| Years | Team | Apps | (Gls) |
| 2005–2007 | Varteks | 11 | (1) |
| 2007 | Zrinjski | 1 | (0) |
| 2008–2009 | Vllaznia | 29 | (1) |
| 2009 | Flamurtari | 3 | (0) |
| 2011 | Kastrioti | 12 | (0) |
| 2011 | NK Vodice | | |
| 2012 | Šibenik | 20 | (2) |
| 2013 | NK Vodice | | |
| 2014–2015 | NK Obres Sveti Ilija | | |
- * Club domestic league appearances and goals as of 28 May 2011

Marko Bašić (born 13 September 1984) is a Croatian retired football player.

== Club career ==
He has also played for NK Varteks in Croatia and Kastrioti Krujë in the Albanian Superliga. He last played professionally for HNK Šibenik.
