= Marcelo (footballer, born 1984) =

Brazilian footballer

Personal information
- Full name: Marcelo dos Santos Marinho
- Date of birth: 2 March 1984 (age 42)
- Place of birth: Mococa, Brazil
- Height: 1.86 m (6 ft 1 in)
- Position: Goalkeeper

Youth career
- 2004: América-SP
- 2004: Corinthians

Senior career*
Years	Team	Apps	(Gls)
2005–2010	Corinthians	29	(0)
2008	→ Ituano (loan)	0	(0)
2009–2010	→ Bahia (loan)	27	(0)
2010	Atlético Mineiro	4	(0)
2011	ASA	0	(0)
2012	Vitória-ES	0	(0)
2013	Penapolense	0	(0)
2013	Paysandu	9	(0)
2014	Penapolense	0	(0)
2015	Marília	0	(0)
- * Club domestic league appearances and goals

Marcelo dos Santos Marinho or simply Marcelo (born 2 March 1984 in Mococa), is a Brazilian former professional footballer who played as a goalkeeper.

== Honours ==
Corinthians

- Série A: 2005
