= C.D. Atlético Morazán =

- Full name: Club Deportivo Atlético Morazán
- Founded: 1970; 55 years ago
- Ground: Estadio Correcaminos; San Francisco Gotera, El Salvador

Club Deportivo Atlético Morazán is a Salvadoran professional football club based in Tierra de Fuego, Morazán, El Salvador.
