= ADF Siquirres =

Costa Rican sports club

Siquirres
- Full name: Asociación Deportiva Siquirres
- Founded: 2010
- Ground: Finca Siquirres
- Capacity: 1.000
- League: LINAFA
- Clausura 2022: 4° - Grupo Limón A
Home colours	Away colours	Third colours

The Asociación Deportiva Siquirres is a Costa Rican sports club, mostly known for its football team which currently plays in the Costa Rican Third Division.

The club is located in Siquirres, Limón Province, and play their home games at the Finca Siquirres.

== History ==
Founded only in 2010, Siquirreña won promotion to the Liga Ascenso in summer 2013 after beating Jicaral in a promotion playoff final. They had lost that final a year earlier against Finca Austria de Nosara.
