= Rodolfo Mills =

Costa Rican footballer (born 1958)

Personal information
- Full name: Rodolfo Mills Palmer
- Date of birth: 25 May 1958 (age 68)
- Place of birth: Limón, Costa Rica
- Position: Defender

Youth career
- Deportivo Cavallini

Senior career*
Years	Team	Apps	(Gls)
1974–1976	Limonense		
1977–1981	Alajuelense		
1981	Motagua		(3)
1982–1983	Limonense		
1984–1987	Alajuelense		
1987	Herediano		
1987–1988	Saprissa		
1988–1990	Limonense		

International career
1980–1985	Costa Rica	17	(3)
- * Club domestic league appearances and goals

Rodolfo Mills Palmer (born 25 May 1958 in Limón) is a retired Costa Rican football player.

== Club career ==
A tough-tackling defender, Mills made his professional debut for Limonense on 6 April 1975 against Alajuelense. He later played for Liga over two periods and had a stint abroad with Honduran side F.C. Motagua. He also played for Herediano and Saprissa. He retired in September 1990.

== International career ==
Mills was capped by Costa Rica, playing 17 games and scoring 3 goals. He represented his country in 9 FIFA World Cup qualification matches.

His final international was a September 1985 FIFA World Cup qualification match against Honduras.
