= 2012–13 Costa Rican Primera División season =

2012–13 Campeonato JPS 2012
- Season: 2012–13
- Champions: Apertura: Alajuelense; Clausura: Herediano
- Relegated: San Carlos
- Champions League: Alajuelense; Herediano; Cartaginés
- Matches: 138
- Goals: 367 (2.66 per match)
- Top goalscorer: Invierno: Cristian Lagos (18)
- Biggest home win: Pérez Zeledón 6–0 Carmelita; Cartaginés 6–0 Santos
- Biggest away win: San Carlos 1–6 Saprissa
- Highest scoring: San Carlos 1–6 Saprissa; Pérez Zeledón 4–3 Limón; Uruguay 4–3 Herediano; Carmelita 2–5 Santos
- Highest attendance: 18,894 Saprissa – Alajuelense
- Lowest attendance: 39 Belén – Santos
- Total attendance: 360,158

The 2012–13 Primera División season (known as the Campeonato JPS 2012–13 for sponsorship reasons) is the 94th of Costa Rica's top-flight professional football league. The season was divided into two championships: the Invierno and the Verano. Club Sport Uruguay de Coronado is one of the new members.

The Invierno season was dedicated to Carlos "Cañón" González.

== Campeonato de Invierno ==
The tournament began on 25 July 2012 and ended on 23 December 2012.

=== First Stage ===
==== Standings ====
Pos	Team	Pld	W	D	L	GF	GA	GD	Pts	Qualification
1	Alajuelense	22	13	5	4	36	22	+14	44	Advances to the Semifinals
2	Deportivo Saprissa	22	13	4	5	41	22	+19	43	Advances to the Semifinals
3	Herediano	22	10	7	5	37	25	+12	37	Advances to the Semifinals
4	Limón (1961-2022)	22	9	6	7	31	30	+1	33	Advances to the Semifinals
5	Santos	22	9	5	8	39	37	+2	32	
6	Uruguay	22	9	3	10	25	31	−6	30	
7	Pérez Zeledón	22	8	4	10	35	31	+4	28	
8	Belén	22	7	7	8	23	27	−4	28	
9	Carmelita	22	6	7	9	21	33	−12	25	
10	Puntarenas	22	5	7	10	22	34	−12	22	
11	Cartaginés	22	5	6	11	24	25	−1	21	
12	San Carlos	22	5	5	12	24	41	−17	20	

Source: Unafut.com
Rules for classification: 1) points; 2) goal difference; 3) number of goals scored.

==== Results ====
Home \ Away	ALA	BEL	CRM	CAR	HER	LIM	PEZ	PUN	SAC	SAN	SAP	URU
Alajuelense		1–0	2–0	1–0	0–3	0–0	2–1	3–1	1–1	2–1	2–3	2–0
Belén	1–3		1–0	1–0	0–0	1–2	2–1	0–0	2–3	3–3	1–0	0–2
Carmelita	0–3	2–2		0–0	0–0	1–1	1–1	0–1	4–2	2–5	1–1	1–2
Cartaginés	1–1	1–1	1–2		2–3	0–1	0–0	3–1	0–0	6–0	1–3	0–1
Herediano	2–4	1–1	0–0	1–1		2–0	2–1	4–1	1–0	2–0	2–1	2–0
Limón	1–0	1–1	2–1	1–2	3–3		2–1	0–1	2–1	3–2	1–0	5–1
Pérez Zeledón	0–1	0–1	6–0	1–0	2–2	4–3		1–1	2–1	4–1	1–2	2–1
Puntarenas	2–2	3–2	0–1	1–0	0–2	2–1	0–2		3–3	0–0	0–0	1–2
San Carlos	2–0	1–0	0–2	0–2	1–0	2–2	1–3	2–0		0–1	1–6	0–2
Santos	0–2	3–0	1–2	3–2	2–1	3–0	2–1	2–2	5–1		2–2	1–1
Deportivo Saprissa	2–2	0–2	2–0	2–0	2–1	2–0	3–1	2–1	2–1	0–2		2–0
Uruguay	1–2	0–1	0–1	1–2	4–3	0–0	3–0	2–1	1–1	1–0	0–4	

Source: http://www.unafut.com/site/index.php?option=com_content&view=article&id=21:resultados&catid=1:campeonato-primera-division&Itemid=21
Legend: Blue = home team win; Yellow = draw; Red = away team win.

=== Second stage ===
Semifinals
2	Saprissa	1	0	1
3	Herediano	1	1	2
1	Alajuelense	1	0	1
4	Limón	0	0	0

Finals
Herediano	1	1	2
Alajuelense	2	1	3

=== Semifinals ===
==== First legs ====
2 December 2012
18:00 UTC-6

Herediano	1–1	Saprissa
Ruiz 53'		Sequeira 29'

Estadio Eladio Rosabal Cordero, Heredia
Referee: Wálter Quesada

5 December 2012
20:00 UTC-6

Limón	0–1	Alajuelense
		Acosta 35'

Estadio Nacional de Costa Rica, San José
Referee: Jeffrey Solís

==== Second legs ====
9 December 2012
15:00 UTC-6

Deportivo Saprissa	0–1	Herediano
		Núñez 81'

Estadio Ricardo Saprissa Aymá, Tibas
Referee: Hugo Cruz

9 December 2012
18:00 UTC-6

Alajuelense	0–0	Limón

Estadio Alejandro Morera Soto, Alajuela
Referee: Ricardo Montero

=== Finals ===
==== First leg ====
16 December 2012

Herediano	1–2	Alajuelense
C. Montero 68'	report	A. Guevara 25'; J. Davis 30'

Estadio Eladio Rosabal Cordero, Heredia
Referee: Ricardo Cerdas

==== Second leg ====
23 December 2012

Alajuelense	1–1	Herediano
Á. Sánchez 111'	report	I. Gómez 88' (pen.)

Estadio Alejandro Morera Soto, Alajuela
Referee: Walter Quesada

Campeonato de Invierno Scotiabank champion

28th title

== Campeonato de Verano ==
The tournament began on 1 January 2013 and ended on 5 May 2013.

=== First Stage ===
==== Standings ====
Pos	Team	Pld	W	D	L	GF	GA	GD	Pts	Qualification or relegation
1	Herediano	22	13	4	5	47	31	+16	43	Advances to the Semifinals
2	Cartaginés	22	12	5	5	29	18	+11	41	Advances to the Semifinals
3	Deportivo Saprissa	22	11	5	6	34	24	+10	38	Advances to the Semifinals
4	Pérez Zeledón	22	10	5	7	31	28	+3	35	Advances to the Semifinals
5	Alajuelense	22	10	4	8	38	29	+9	34	
6	Puntarenas	22	7	9	6	35	35	0	30	
7	Santos	22	8	5	9	22	30	−8	29	
8	Uruguay	22	7	7	8	30	27	+3	28	
9	San Carlos (R)	22	5	7	10	23	33	−10	22	Relegation to Segunda División
10	Carmelita	22	6	3	13	27	37	−10	21	
11	Limón	22	4	9	9	19	31	−12	21	
12	Belén	22	4	7	11	27	39	−12	19	

Source: Unafut.com
Rules for classification: 1) points; 2) goal difference; 3) number of goals scored.
(R) Relegated

==== Results ====
Home \ Away	ALA	BEL	CRM	CAR	HER	LIM	PEZ	PUN	SAC	SAN	SAP	URU
Alajuelense		0–0	4–1	2–0	2–2	2–2	0–1	2–0	1–0	4–0	3–1	1–1
Belén	2–0		4–1	0–1	2–3	1–1	1–2	2–0	2–4	1–1	0–3	1–1
Carmelita	3–1	3–0		0–2	3–5	1–0	0–1	1–1	2–0	0–1	0–1	3–0
Cartaginés	1–0	2–3	2–0		3–1	3–0	0–1	1–0	2–0	0–0	0–0	1–2
Herediano	2–1	3–1	1–1	0–2		2–1	5–1	4–1	2–0	4–1	1–2	2–1
Limón	1–0	1–1	0–2	1–1	1–2		1–1	1–1	0–2	1–0	2–0	2–1
Pérez Zeledón	4–1	2–1	3–1	1–2	2–0	3–0		0–0	2–0	1–1	1–2	1–1
Puntarenas	2–4	4–2	2–2	1–1	3–3	2–1	3–2		3–0	3–0	2–2	1–0
San Carlos	2–3	1–1	2–1	0–0	1–2	1–1	1–1	0–0		2–0	1–1	1–1
Santos	1–4	2–1	4–1	0–1	1–0	0–0	3–1	3–1	3–2		0–2	1–0
Deportivo Saprissa	1–0	1–1	1–0	2–3	0–0	2–2	4–0	2–3	1–2	1–0		2–1
Uruguay	2–3	3–0	2–1	1–1	2–3	3–0	1–0	2–2	4–1	0–0	1–0	

Source: http://www.unafut.com/site/index.php?option=com_content&view=article&id=21:resultados&catid=1:campeonato-primera-division&Itemid=21
Legend: Blue = home team win; Yellow = draw; Red = away team win.

=== Second stage ===
Semifinals
2	Cartaginés	1	0	1
3	Saprissa	1	0	1
1	Herediano	4	1	5
4	Pérez Zeledón	3	0	3

Finals
Cartaginés	3	1	4
Herediano	1	3	4

Campeonato de Verano Scotiabank champion

23rd title
