= Saúl Phillips =

Costa Rican footballer (born 1984)

Personal information
- Full name: Saúl Phillips Fernández
- Date of birth: October 3, 1984 (age 42)
- Place of birth: San José, Costa Rica
- Height: 1.78 m (5 ft 10 in)
- Position: Midfielder

Team information
- Current team: Bayamón
- Number: 18

Youth career
- Alajuelense

Senior career*
Years	Team	Apps	(Gls)
2001–2007	Saprissa		
2007–2009	Brujas		
2009–2010	Santos de Guápiles		
2011	Saprissa		
2011–2012	Municipal		
2013–2014	USAC		
2014–	Bayamón		

International career
2001	Costa Rica U17		
- * Club domestic league appearances and goals

Saúl Phillips Fernández (born October 3, 1984) is a Costa Rican football player who currently plays for Bayamón in the National Premier Soccer League.

== Club career ==
Phillips came through the youth system at Alajuelense and has played for Saprissa from 2001. With Saprissa he won two national championships as well as a UNCAF Cup title and a CONCACAF Champions Cup title. He also played the 2005 FIFA Club World Championship, where Saprissa finished third behind São Paulo and Liverpool

He moved to Brujas in summer 2007 and was captain of Santos de Guápiles before returning to Saprissa in December 2010.

In December 2012, Phillips left Guatemalan giants Municipal, joining Universidad and in summer 2014 he moved to Puerto Rico to play for Bayamón.

== International career ==
He was on the U17 Costa Rica national team that played in the 2001 FIFA U-17 World Championship held in Trinidad and Tobago. He never made it to the senior national team.
