= Asociación Deportiva Limonense =

Costa Rican football team (1961–2009)

Limonense
- Full name: Asociacion Deportiva Limonense
- Nicknames: Asodeli; Caribeños
- Founded: July 10, 1961
- Dissolved: 2009 (as Limón F.C.)
- Ground: Estadio Juan Gobán; Limón, Costa Rica
- Capacity: 3,000
Home colours	Away colours

Asociacion Deportiva Limonense also known as ASODELI, was a Costa Rican football team, which played for more than 20 years at the Costa Rican top level, the Primera Division.

It was based in Limón, their home stadium Estadio Juan Gobán and nicknamed "Caribeños" (Caribbeans).

== History ==
The football club was founded on 10 July 1961 and made its debut in the Primera División on 19 April 1964.

By 2009, playing on Segunda Division level, the team entered in a financial crisis and the shareholders agreed to lease the team to local businessman Carlos Howden Pascal, renaming the team to Limón F.C.

== Stadium ==
The Juan Gobán Stadium in late 2008

The Juan Gobán Stadium is a soccer stadium located in Limón, head of the province of the same name, on the Caribbean coast of Costa Rica.

In February 2010, a synthetic turf measuring 91 meters long by 72 meters wide was installed. The following reforms included the construction of boxes, press areas, complete remodeling of the dressing rooms and installation of artificial lighting.

In September 2010, the Juan Gobán stadium was reopened after a series of renovations that involved a year and a half of work, in addition to an investment of close to $1 million, 800 thousand dollars.

Among the novelties is the expansion of the dressing room area from two to four, a weight room, a doping room, laundry, four sodas, two offices, the installation of 20 restrooms and a VIP area for 220 people. In addition to the total replacement of the roof of the shadow grandstand.

In general, the capacity of the redoubt was expanded to 2,349 people. The stadium was home to the Limon F.C. of the First Division of Costa Rica from 2010 to 2020.

== Honours ==
- Primera División de Costa Rica

Runner up (1): 1981

- Segunda División de Costa Rica

Champion (2): 1971, 1998

== See also ==
- Limón F.C.
- Limón Black Star
