= Limón F.C. =

Costa Rican football club

Limón
- Full name: Limón Fútbol Club
- Nicknames: La Tromba del Caribe (The Caribbean Whirlwind)
- Founded: 10 July 1961; 65 years ago (as A.D. Limonense)
- Dissolved: 12 February 2022; 4 years ago (as Limón Black Star
- Ground: Estadio Juán Gobán
- Capacity: 2,900
Home colours	Away colours

Limón Fútbol Club, commonly known as Limón, was a professional football club based in Limón, Costa Rica. It last played in the Liga de Ascenso.

The team played their home matches at the Estadio Juan Gobán, though they also used the nearby new stadium, especially during their promotion to Primera División.

During their stint on the Liga FPD, the team was known for its vast reliance on local young talent.

== History ==
In 2009, local businessman Carlos Howden Pascal decided to invest in local second division soccer team ASODELI, shareholders agreed to lease the team and were renamed "Limón FC". In 2010, the team quickly returned to Costa Rica top level division Primera Division.

By June 2011, Carlos Pascal was incarcerated and had his banks accounts frozen. In doing, he compromised the team's financial situation. He was released in 2013, but his bank accounts were still frozen, Currently some players are receiving bonds as salary until the case is settled. Many players don't only play for Limón for income. Most of them work at the local port and various associated businesses.

Limon FC were dissolved in February 2022 because of debts to the CCSS.

== Stadium ==
The Juan Gobán Stadium is a soccer stadium located in Limón, head of the province of the same name, on the Caribbean coast of Costa Rica.

In February 2010, a synthetic turf measuring 91 meters long by 72 meters wide was installed. The following reforms included the construction of boxes, press areas, complete remodeling of the dressing rooms and installation of artificial lighting.

In September 2010, the Juan Gobán stadium was reopened after a series of renovations that involved a year and a half of work, in addition to an investment of close to $1 million, 800 thousand dollars.

Among the novelties was the expansion of the dressing room area from two to four, a weight room, a doping room, laundry, four sodas, two offices, the installation of 20 restrooms and a VIP area for 220 people. In addition, there was a total replacement for the roof of the shadow grandstand. Also, the capacity of the stadium was expanded to 2,349 people. The stadium was home to the Limon F.C. of the First Division of Costa Rica from 2010 to 2020.

== Honours ==
- Segunda Division
  - Champions (1): 2010–11
- Invierno Semi-finals
  - Champions (1): 2012–13

== See also ==
- A.D. Limonense
- Limón Black Star
