= 2001 FIFA U-17 World Championship =

FIFA U-17 World Championship Trinidad & Tobago 2001
- Trinidad & Tobago 2001 official logo

Tournament details
- Host country: Trinidad and Tobago
- Dates: 13–30 September
- Teams: 16 (from 6 confederations)
- Venues: 5 (in 5 host cities)

Final positions
- Champions: France (1st title)
- Runners-up: Nigeria
- Third place: Burkina Faso
- Fourth place: Argentina

Tournament statistics
- Matches played: 32
- Goals scored: 102 (3.19 per match)
- Attendance: 331,198 (10,350 per match)
- Top scorer(s): (France) Florent Sinama Pongolle (9 goals)
- Best player: (France) Florent Sinama Pongolle
- Fair play award: Nigeria

The FIFA U-17 World Championship 2001, the ninth edition of the tournament, was held from 13 to 30 September 2001 in the cities of Trinidad and Tobago; in Port of Spain, Malabar in Arima, Marabella in San Fernando, Couva, and Bacolet in Scarborough. Players born after 1 January 1984 could participate in this tournament.

== Venues ==
Port of Spain	Arima/Malabar	Couva	Marabella	Scarborough
Hasely Crawford Stadium	Larry Gomes Stadium	Ato Boldon Stadium	Manny Ramjohn Stadium	Dwight Yorke Stadium
10°39′41.48″N 61°31′58.92″W	10°36′59.00″N 61°16′57.00″W	10°25′29.00″N 61°25′02.00″W	10°18′12.00″N 61°26′30.00″W	11°10′53.17″N 60°43′00.86″W
Capacity: 27,000	Capacity: 10,000	Capacity: 10,000	Capacity: 10,000	Capacity: 7,500
2001 FIFA U-17 World Championship is located in Trinidad and Tobago

== Mascot ==
The official mascot of this FIFA U-17 World Championship, Trinidad & Tobago 2001, was BEATS, the humming bird. Its outfit is the same as the home national team, red shirt, black short and red socks. It has Trinidad & Tobago 2001 on the chest.

== Squads ==
- 2001 FIFA U-17 World Championship squads

== Qualification ==
The following 16 teams qualified for the tournament:

Confederation	Qualifying Tournament	Qualifier(s)
AFC (Asia)	2000 AFC U-17 Championship	Oman; Iran; Japan
CAF (Africa)	2001 African U-17 Championship	Nigeria; Burkina Faso; Mali
CONCACAF (North, Central America & Caribbean)	Host nation	Trinidad and Tobago
CONCACAF (North, Central America & Caribbean)	2001 CONCACAF U-17 Tournament	United States; Costa Rica
CONMEBOL (South America)	2001 South American U-17 Championship	Brazil; Argentina; Paraguay
OFC (Oceania)	2001 OFC U-17 Championship	Australia
UEFA (Europe)	2001 UEFA European Under-16 Championship	Spain; France; Croatia

== Group stages ==
=== Group A ===
Team	Pld	W	D	L	GF	GA	GD	Pts
Brazil	3	3	0	0	10	2	+8	9
Australia	3	2	0	1	5	1	+4	6
Croatia	3	1	0	2	3	8	–5	3
Trinidad and Tobago	3	0	0	3	2	9	–7	0

13 September 2001
13:00

Trinidad and Tobago	1 – 2	Croatia
Blackman 57'	Report	Kranjčar 43' (pen.), 67' (pen.)

Hasely Crawford Stadium, Port of Spain
Attendance: 10,500
Referee: Giménez Daniel (Argentina)

14 September 2001
18:00

Australia	0 – 1	Brazil
	Report	Anderson 76'

Hasely Crawford Stadium, Port of Spain
Attendance: 10,800
Referee: Benes Michal (Czech Republic)

16 September 2001
13:00

Trinidad and Tobago	0 – 1	Australia
	Report	Agius 55'

Hasely Crawford Stadium, Port of Spain
Attendance: 25,100
Referee: Alexandru Tudor (Romania)

16 September 2001
15:30

Croatia	1 – 3	Brazil
Prijić 6'	Report	Bruno 7'; Bonfim 57'; Caetano 77'

Hasely Crawford Stadium, Port of Spain
Attendance: 25,100
Referee: Sibrian Rodolfo (Slovenia)

19 September 2001
17:00

Brazil	6 – 1	Trinidad and Tobago
Malzoni 7'; Caetano 16', 41', 59'; James 36' (o.g.); Júnior 88'	Report	Forbes 61'

Hasely Crawford Stadium, Port of Spain
Attendance: 26,000
Referee: Issa Hussein (Iraq)

19 September 2001
19:30

Croatia	0 – 4	Australia
	Report	Smith 37'; Danze 40', 46', 66'

Hasely Crawford Stadium, Port of Spain
Attendance: 20,228
Referee: Chukwujekwu Chukwudi (Nigeria)

=== Group B ===
Team	Pld	W	D	L	GF	GA	GD	Pts
Nigeria	3	3	0	0	8	1	+7	9
France	3	2	0	1	11	6	+5	6
Japan	3	1	0	2	2	9	–7	3
United States	3	0	0	3	3	8	–5	0

14 September 2001
17:00

United States	0 – 1	Japan
	Report	Abe 43'

Dwight Yorke Stadium, Bacolet
Attendance: 7,500
Referee: De Oliveira Paulo (Brazil)

14 September 2001
19:30

France	1 – 2	Nigeria
Sinama Pongolle 87'	Report	Shaibu 24'; Brown 75'

Dwight Yorke Stadium, Bacolet
Attendance: 7,000
Referee: Ramdhan Ramesh (Trinidad & Tobago)

16 September 2001
16:00

Japan	0 – 4	Nigeria
	Report	Shaibu 35'; Opabunmi 39'; Brown 83'; Temile 90+1' (pen.)

Dwight Yorke Stadium, Bacolet
Attendance: 7,500
Referee: Cardoso Batista Lucilio (Portugal)

16 September 2001
18:30

United States	3 – 5	France
Magee 19'; Colombo 28' (o.g.); Johnson 75'	Report	Sinama Pongolle 4', 60', 65'; Piètre 31'; Meghni 48'

Dwight Yorke Stadium, Bacolet
Attendance: 7,000
Referee: Im Eun Ju (Korea Republic)

19 September 2001
17:00

Nigeria	2 – 0	United States
Shaibu 32'; Ayuba 58'	Report

Dwight Yorke Stadium, Bacolet
Attendance: 7,500
Referee: Attison Harry (Vanuatu)

19 September 2001
19:30

Japan	1 – 5	France
Yano 67'	Report	Piètre 11'; Sinama Pongolle 13', 54', 57'; Drouin 15'

Dwight Yorke Stadium, Bacolet
Attendance: 7,315
Referee: Gimenez Daniel (Argentina)

=== Group C ===
Team	Pld	W	D	L	GF	GA	GD	Pts
Argentina	3	2	1	0	9	4	+5	7
Burkina Faso	3	1	2	0	4	3	+1	5
Spain	3	1	0	2	4	6	–2	3
Oman	3	0	1	2	2	6	–4	1

15 September 2001
16:00

Oman	1 – 2	Spain
Al-Hinai 22'	Report	F. Torres 50'; Melli 90+2'

Ato Boldon Stadium, Couva
Attendance: 7,500
Referee: Richard Contreras Samuel (Dominican Republic)

15 September 2001
18:30

Argentina	2 – 2	Burkina Faso
Correa 2'; López 90+2' (pen.)	Report	Sanou 22'; Conombo 79'

Ato Boldon Stadium, Couva
Attendance: 7,500
Referee: Attison Harry (Vanuatu)

17 September 2001
17:00

Spain	0 – 1	Burkina Faso
	Report	Sanou 41' (pen.)

Manny Ramjohn Stadium, Marabella
Attendance: 7,500
Referee: Jakobsson Kristinn (Iceland)

17 September 2001
19:30

Oman	0 – 3	Argentina
	Report	López 10'; Tevez 37'; Colace 52' (pen.)

Manny Ramjohn Stadium, Marabella
Attendance: 7,500
Referee: Evehe Divine (Cameroon)

20 September 2001
17:00

Burkina Faso	1 – 1	Oman
Nikiema 22'	Report	Al-Hinai 33'

Ato Boldon Stadium, Couva
Attendance: 7,000
Referee: Alexandru Tudor (Romania)

20 September 2001
19:30

Spain	2 – 4	Argentina
Bauzà 23'; Senel 30'	Report	Colace 3' (pen.); López 57'; Zabaleta 72'; Aguirre 83'

Ato Boldon Stadium, Couva
Attendance: 9,300
Referee: Sibrian Rodolfo (Slovenia)

=== Group D ===
Team	Pld	W	D	L	GF	GA	GD	Pts
Costa Rica	3	2	0	1	5	2	+3	6
Mali	3	2	0	1	4	2	+2	6
Paraguay	3	2	0	1	5	6	–1	6
Iran	3	0	0	3	2	6	–4	0

15 September 2001
16:00

Mali	1 – 2	Paraguay
Traoré 76'	Report	López 52'; Jara 86' (pen.)

Larry Gomes Stadium, Malabar
Attendance: 4,500
Referee: Issa Hussein (Iraq)

15 September 2001
18:30

Iran	0 – 2	Costa Rica
	Report	Alonso 51'; Azofeifa 76'

Larry Gomes Stadium, Malabar
Attendance: 6,500
Referee: Chukwujekwu Chukwudi (Nigeria)

17 September 2001
17:00

Paraguay	0 – 3	Costa Rica
	Report	Alonso 75', 84'; Azofeifa 82'

Larry Gomes Stadium, Malabar
Attendance: 3,500
Referee: Benes Michal (Czech Republic)

17 September 2001
19:30

Mali	1 – 0	Iran
Coulibaly 38'	Report

Larry Gomes Stadium, Malabar
Attendance: 3,270
Referee: Ramdhan Ramesh (Trinidad & Tobago)

20 September 2001
17:00

Costa Rica	0 – 2	Mali
	Report	Coulibaly 20'; Diarra 33'

Larry Gomes Stadium, Malabar
Attendance: 4,000
Referee: De Oliveira Paulo (Brazil)

20 September 2001
19:30

Paraguay	3 – 2	Iran
Pérez Matto 19', 42'; Jara 66'	Report	Ahmadzadeh 81', 90+3'

Larry Gomes Stadium, Malabar
Attendance: 4,000
Referee: Jakobsson Kristinn (Iceland)

== Knockout stages ==
Quarter-finals
23 September - Port of Spain
Brazil	1
France	2
24 September - Marabella
Argentina (aet)	2
Mali	1
23 September - Port of Spain
Nigeria	5
Australia	1
24 September - Marabella
Costa Rica	0
Burkina Faso	2

Semi-finals
27 September - Port of Spain
France	2
Argentina	1
27 September - Malabar
Nigeria	1
Burkina Faso	0

Final
30 September - Port of Spain
France	3
Nigeria	0
Third place
30 September - Port of Spain
Argentina	0
Burkina Faso	2

=== Quarter-finals ===
23 September 2001
16:30

Brazil	1 – 2	France
Alberoni 70'	Report	Sinama Pongolle 38'; Le Tallec 40'

Dwight Yorke Stadium, Bacolet
Attendance: 7,500
Referee: Ramdhan Ramesh (Trinidad & Tobago)

23 September 2001
19:30

Nigeria	5 – 1	Australia
Opabunmi 24' (pen.), 69', 79'; Mohammed 81'; Temile 85'	Report	Engele 86'

Dwight Yorke Stadium, Bacolet
Attendance: 8,000
Referee: Jakobsson Kristinn (Iceland)

24 September 2001
16:30

Argentina	2 – 1 (a.e.t.)	Mali
Rodríguez 38'; Fanari 96'	Report	Diarra 35'

Manny Ramjohn Stadium, Marabella
Attendance: 8,000
Referee: Cardoso Batista Lucilio (Portugal)

24 September 2001
19:30

Costa Rica	0 – 2	Burkina Faso
	Report	Gorogo 56'; Sanou 84'

Manny Ramjohn Stadium, Marabella
Attendance: 8,700
Referee: Attison Harry (Vanuatu)

=== Semi-finals ===
27 September 2001
16:30

France	2 – 1	Argentina
Le Tallec 56'; Berthod 58'	Report	Tevez 49'

Hasely Crawford Stadium, Port of Spain
Attendance: 9,200
Referee: Evehe Divine (Cameroon)

27 September 2001
19:30

Nigeria	1 – 0	Burkina Faso
Opabunmi 4' (pen.)	Report

Larry Gomes Stadium, Malabar
Attendance: 7,500
Referee: Richard Contreras Samuel (Dominican Republic)

=== Third place match ===
30 September 2001
15:30

Argentina	0 – 2	Burkina Faso
	Report	Gorogo 30'; Conombo 78'

Hasely Crawford Stadium, Port of Spain
Attendance: 25,000
Referee: Issa Hussein (Iraq)

=== Final ===
30 September 2001
18:00

France	3 – 0	Nigeria
Sinama Pongolle 34'; Le Tallec 53'; Piètre 81'	Report

Hasely Crawford Stadium, Port of Spain
Attendance: 20,790
Referee: Lucílio Batista (Portugal)

== Winners ==
2001 FIFA U-17 World champions

France
First title

== Awards ==
FIFA Golden Shoe	FIFA Golden Ball	FIFA Fair Play Award
(France) Florent Sinama Pongolle		Nigeria

== Goalscorers ==
Florent Sinama Pongolle of France won the Golden Shoe award for scoring nine goals.

There were 102 goals scored in 32 matches, for an average of 3.19 goals per match.

9 goals

- (France) Florent Sinama Pongolle

5 goals

- (Nigeria) Femi Opabunmi

4 goals

- (Brazil) Caetano

3 goals

- (Argentina) Maxi López
- (Australia) Anthony Danze
- (Burkina Faso) Wilfried Sanou
- (Costa Rica) Armando Alonso
- (France) Anthony Le Tallec
- (France) Samuel Piètre
- (Nigeria) Karimu Shaibu

2 goals

- (Argentina) Carlos Tevez
- (Argentina) Hugo Colace
- (Burkina Faso) Henoc Conombo
- (Burkina Faso) Paul Gorogo
- (Costa Rica) Randall Azofeifa
- (Croatia) Niko Kranjčar
- (Iran) Mansour Ahmadzadeh
- (Mali) Bakary Coulibaly
- (Mali) Drissa Diarra
- (Nigeria) Omonigho Temile
- (Nigeria) Victor Brown
- (Oman) Mohammed Al-Hinai
- (Paraguay) Aldo Jara
- (Paraguay) Andrés Pérez Matto

1 goal

- (Argentina) Gonzalo Rodríguez
- (Argentina) Lucas Correa
- (Argentina) Marcos Aguirre
- (Argentina) Mauro Fanari
- (Argentina) Pablo Zabaleta
- (Australia) Fred Agius
- (Australia) Matthew Engele
- (Australia) Terry Smith
- (Brazil) Alberoni
- (Brazil) Anderson Costa
- (Brazil) Bruno
- (Brazil) Júnior
- (Brazil) Leandro Bonfim
- (Brazil) Malzoni
- (Burkina Faso) Abdoul Aziz Nikiema
- (Croatia) Dejan Prijić
- (France) Jérémy Berthod
- (France) Mourad Meghni
- (France) Stephen Drouin
- (Japan) Kisho Yano
- (Japan) Yutaro Abe
- (Mali) Alain Claude Traoré
- (Nigeria) Moses Ayuba
- (Nigeria) Suleiman Mohammed
- (Paraguay) Blas López
- (Spain) Fernando Torres
- (Spain) Guillem Bauzà
- (Spain) Melli
- (Spain) Senel
- (Trinidad and Tobago) Jerol Forbes
- (Trinidad and Tobago) Nkosi Blackman
- (United States) Eddie Johnson
- (United States) Mike Magee

1 own goal

- (France) Julio Colombo (against United States)
- (Trinidad and Tobago) Julius James (against Brazil)

== Final ranking ==
Rank	Team	Pld	W	D	L	GF	GA	GD	Pts
1	France	6	5	0	1	18	8	+10	15
2	Nigeria	6	5	0	1	14	5	+9	15
3	Burkina Faso	6	3	2	1	8	4	+4	11
4	Argentina	6	3	1	2	12	9	+3	10
Eliminated in the quarter-finals
5	Brazil	4	3	0	1	11	4	+7	9
6	Costa Rica	4	2	0	2	5	4	+1	6
6	Mali	4	2	0	2	5	4	+1	6
8	Australia	4	2	0	2	6	6	0	6
Eliminated at the group stage
9	Paraguay	3	2	0	1	5	6	–1	6
10	Spain	3	1	0	2	4	6	–2	3
11	Croatia	3	1	0	2	3	8	–5	3
12	Japan	3	1	0	2	2	9	–7	3
13	Oman	3	0	1	2	2	6	–4	1
14	Iran	3	0	0	3	2	6	–4	0
15	United States	3	0	0	3	3	8	–5	0
16	Trinidad and Tobago	3	0	0	3	2	9	–7	0
