= 2009–10 ES Sétif season =

ES Sétif
2009–10 season
- President: Abdelhakim Serrar
- Head Coach: Rachid Belhout (until 22 September 2009); Ali Mechiche (from 20 September 2009) (until 8 December 2009); Noureddine Zekri (from 8 December 2009)
- Stadium: Stade 8 Mai 1945
- National 1: Runners-up
- Algerian Cup: Winner
- Confederation Cup: Runners-up
- Champions League: Second round
- Top goalscorer: League: Nabil Hemani (11); All: Abdelmalek Ziaya (19)

The 2009–10 season was ES Sétif's 40th season in the Algerian top flight, newly renamed to the Algerian Ligue Professionnelle 1, as well as the 2010 CAF Champions League and the Algerian Cup.

== Squad list ==
Players and squad numbers last updated on 6 August 2009.
Note: Flags indicate national team as has been defined under FIFA eligibility rules. Players may hold more than one non-FIFA nationality.

No.	Name	Nat.	Position	Date of birth (age)	Signed from
Goalkeepers
1	(Algeria)	Faouzi Chaouchi	GK	5 December 1984 (aged 24)	(Algeria) JS Kabylie
30	(Algeria)	Mohamed Seghir Ferradji	GK	22 August 1975 (aged 33)	(Algeria) OMR El Annasser
12	(Algeria)	Boualem Mokhtar Benmalek	GK	30 January 1989 (aged 20)	(Algeria) Reserve team
Defenders
5	(Algeria)	Smail Diss	CB	2 December 1976 (aged 32)	(Algeria) USM Blida
4	(Algeria)	Abdelkader Laifaoui	CB	29 July 1981 (aged 28)	(Algeria) CR Belouizdad
20	(Algeria)	Mokhtar Megueni	CB	24 July 1989 (aged 20)	(Algeria) USM Oran
17	(Algeria)	Slimane Raho	RB	20 October 1975 (aged 33)	(Algeria) JS Kabylie
22	(Algeria)	Mohamed Yekhlef	CB	12 January 1981 (aged 28)	(Algeria) WA Tlemcen
3	(Algeria)	Riad Benchadi	LB	7 November 1978 (aged 30)	(Algeria) CA Bordj Bou Arreridj
	(Algeria)	Amine Aksas	CB	5 March 1983 (aged 26)	(Algeria) CR Belouizdad
Midfielders
6	(Algeria)	Farouk Belkaid	DM	14 November 1977 (aged 31)	(Algeria) MC Alger
21	(Algeria)	Mehdi Kacem	DM	8 August 1986 (aged 22)	(France) FC Gueugnon
8	(Algeria)	Khaled Lemmouchia	DM	29 May 1981 (aged 28)	(France) Lyon La Duchère
13	(Algeria)	Mourad Delhoum	DM	10 February 1985 (aged 24)	(Algeria) A Bou Saâda
16	(Algeria)	Azzedine Benchaira	DM	2 November 1978 (aged 30)	(Algeria) US Biskra
23	(Algeria)	Hocine Metref		1 January 1984 (aged 25)	(France) Dijon FCO
11	(Algeria)	Karim Kaddour	AM	6 June 1983 (aged 26)	(Switzerland) Yverdon-Sport
7	(Algeria)	Belkacem Zobiri	AM	23 October 1983 (aged 25)	(France) Louhans-Cuiseaux
15	(Algeria)	Bouazza Feham	AM	11 April 1986 (aged 23)	(Algeria) MC Oran
	(Algeria)	Sid Ali Lamri	CM	3 February 1991 (aged 18)	(Algeria) Reserve team
14	(Algeria)	Lamouri Djediat	AM	20 December 1982 (aged 26)	(Algeria) Paradou AC
10	(Algeria)	Lazhar Hadj Aïssa	AM	23 March 1984 (aged 25)	(Algeria) MSP Batna
Forwards
	(Algeria)	Younes Kadri	RW	4 January 1991 (aged 18)	(Algeria) Reserve team
28	(Algeria)	Rafik Bouderbal	RW	19 September 1987 (aged 21)	(France) FC Lorient (loan)
19	(Algeria)	Nabil Hemani	ST	1 September 1979 (aged 29)	(Algeria) JS Kabylie
	(Algeria)	Abdelmalek Ziaya	ST	23 January 1984 (aged 25)	(Algeria) ES Guelma
24	(Cameroon)	Francis Ambané	ST	8 November 1984 (aged 24)	(Cameroon) Canon Yaoundé
	(Algeria)	Hamid Berguiga	ST	25 April 1974 (aged 35)	(Brunei) DPMM
	(Algeria)	Ilyes Korbiaa	LW	9 November 1992 (aged 16)	(Algeria) Reserve team
2	(Algeria)	Sofiane Bencharif		8 November 1986 (aged 22)	(Algeria) MC Alger
	(Algeria)	Abdelkhalek Guedider		8 October 1990 (aged 18)	(Algeria) Reserve team
18	(Algeria)	Mohamed Seguer	ST	7 September 1985 (aged 23)	(Algeria) MC Saïda

== Competitions ==
=== Overview ===
Competition	Record								Started round	Final position / round	First match	Last match
Competition	G	W	D	L	GF	GA	GD	Win %	Started round	Final position / round	First match	Last match
National	34	17	12	5	51	32	+19	50.00	—N/a	Runners-up	6 August 2009	31 May 2010
Algerian Cup	6	5	1	0	17	3	+14	83.33	Round of 64	Winner	25 December 2009	1 May 2010
Confederation Cup	10	5	1	4	18	12	+6	50.00	Group stage	Runners-up	19 July 2009	5 December 2009
Champions League	6	4	1	1	14	5	+9	66.67	Preliminary Round	Second round	14 February 2010	8 May 2010
Total	56	31	15	10	100	52	+48	55.36				

Updated to match played 3 June 2019
Source: Competitions

=== National ===
==== League table ====
Pos	Team	Pld	W	D	L	GF	GA	GD	Pts	Qualification or relegation
1	MC Alger (C, Q)	34	18	12	4	50	23	+27	66	2011 CAF Champions League
2	ES Sétif (Q)	34	17	12	5	51	32	+19	63	2011 CAF Champions League
3	JS Kabylie (Q)	34	15	9	10	39	27	+12	54	2011 CAF Confederation Cup
4	USM Alger	34	14	11	9	47	33	+14	53	
5	USM El Harrach	34	13	13	8	46	33	+13	52	

Source: Soccerways FIFA.com
Rules for classification: 1) points; 2) goal difference; 3) number of goals scored.
(C) Champions; (Q) Qualified for the phase indicated

==== Results summary ====
Overall								Home						Away					
Pld	W	D	L	GF	GA	GD	Pts	W	D	L	GF	GA	GD	W	D	L	GF	GA	GD
34	17	12	5	51	32	+19	63	11	5	1	31	13	+18	6	7	4	20	19	+1

Last updated: 22 April 2018.
Source: Competitive matches

==== Results by round ====
Round	1	2	3	4	5	6	7	8	9	10	11	12	13	14	15	16	17	18	19	20	21	22	23	24	25	26	27	28	29	30	31	32	33	34
Ground	A	A	H	A	H	A	H	A	H	A	H	A	H	A	H	A	H	H	H	A	H	A	H	A	H	A	H	A	H	A	H	A	H	A
Result																																		
Position																																		

Source: Competitive matches
A = Away; H = Home; W = Win; D = Draw; L = Loss

==== Matches ====
Win Draw Loss

6 August 2009 Round 1	AS Khroub	1–1	ES Sétif	El Khroub
17:00	Gouaich 77'	Soccerway report	Ziaya 66'	Stadium: Abed Hamdani Stadium; Referee: Belkacem Boumaza

25 August 2009 Round 2	MC El Eulma	3–2	ES Sétif	El Eulma
17:00	Laameche 15'; Diss 37' (o.g.); Bourenane 52'	Soccerway report	Ambané 73'; Bencharif 79'	Stadium: Stade Messaoud Zougar; Referee: Djamel Haimoudi

22 August 2009 Round 3	ES Sétif	1–1	CR Belouizdad	Sétif
22:00	Kaddour 62'	Soccerway report	Saïbi 17'	Stadium: Stade 8 Mai 1945; Referee: Redouane Necib

8 September 2009 Round 4	USM Annaba	0–0	ES Sétif	Annaba
23:00		Soccerway report		Stadium: Stade 19 Mai 1956; Referee: Mokhtar Amalou

29 September 2009 Round 5	ES Sétif	2–2	USM Alger	Sétif
20:00	Laïfaoui 22'; Aksas 80'	Soccerway report	26' Rial; 39' Daham	Stadium: Stade 8 Mai 1945; Referee: Mehdi Abid Charef

13 October 2009 Round 6	USM Blida	1–2	ES Sétif	Blida
20:00	Djilani 69'	Soccerway report	Hemani 35', 77'	Stadium: Stade Mustapha Tchaker; Attendance: 0 (close doors); Referee: Mohamed Bouhenni

25 September 2009 Round 7	ES Sétif	4–1	MSP Batna	Sétif
20:00	Ziaya 31'; Seguer 42', 56'; Metref 74'	Soccerway report	Lemouadaâ 63'	Stadium: Stade 8 Mai 1945; Referee: Farouk Mial

3 November 2009 Round 8	CA Bordj Bou Arreridj	2–0	ES Sétif	Bordj Bou Arréridj
18:00	Bentayeb 7', 73'	Soccerway report		Stadium: August 20, 1955 Stadium; Attendance: 0 (close doors); Referee: Mohamed Bichari

8 December 2009 Round 9	ES Sétif	2–0	JS Kabylie	Sétif
18:00	Ziaya 22', 69'	Soccerway report		Stadium: Stade 8 Mai 1945; Referee: Mohamed Benouza

24 October 2009 Round 10	NA Hussein Dey	0–2	ES Sétif	Algiers
17:00		Soccerway report	Hemani 28'; Ziaya 63'	Stadium: Stade Frères Zioui; Referee: Mokhtar Amalou

30 October 2009 Round 11	ES Sétif	1–1	ASO Chlef	Sétif
18:00	Hemani 40'	Soccerway report	Messaoud 25'	Stadium: Stade 8 Mai 1945; Attendance: 0 (close doors); Referee: Mohamed Bouali

6 November 2009 Round 12	USM El Harrach	0–1	ES Sétif	El Harrach
15:00		Soccerway report	Ziaya 90'	Stadium: November 1, 1954 Stadium; Referee: Mohamed Haddada

20 November 2009 Round 13	ES Sétif	2–1	CA Batna	Sétif
18:00	Ziaya 35', 56'	Soccerway report	Fezzani 83'	Stadium: Stade 8 Mai 1945; Attendance: 0 (close doors); Referee: Redouane Necib

9 February 2010 Round 14	MC Alger	1–1	ES Sétif	Algiers
18:00	Bouguèche 52'	Soccerway report	Laifaoui 71'	Stadium: Stade du 5 Juillet; Referee: Mohamed Benouza

22 December 2009 Round 15	ES Sétif	0–1	WA Tlemcen	Sétif
18:00		Soccerway report	Boudjakdji 33'	Stadium: Stade 8 Mai 1945; Referee: Mehdi Abid Charef

23 February 2010 Round 16	MC Oran	1–1	ES Sétif	Oran
14:00	Berramla 38'	Soccerway report	Hadj Aïssa 13'	Stadium: Stade Ahmed Zabana; Referee: Mohamed Bichari

15 December 2009 Round 17	ES Sétif	1–0	JSM Béjaïa	Sétif
18:00	Ambané 35'	Soccerway report		Stadium: Stade 8 Mai 1945; Referee: Djamel Haimoudi

9 March 2010 Round 18	ES Sétif	4–1	AS Khroub	Sétif
18:00	Hemani 34', 69'; Diss 48'; Bouderbal 82'	Soccerway report	Nait Yahia 39'	Stadium: Stade 8 Mai 1945; Referee: Redouane Necib

26 March 2010 Round 19	ES Sétif	0–0	MC El Eulma	Sétif
19:00		Soccerway report		Stadium: Stade 8 Mai 1945; Referee: Rafik Achouri

29 March 2010 Round 20	CR Belouizdad	0–1	ES Sétif	Belouizdad
18:00		Soccerway report	Metref 51' (pen.)	Stadium: Stade 20 Août 1955; Referee: Djamel Haimoudi

5 February 2010 Round 21	ES Sétif	1–0	USM Annaba	Sétif
18:00	Hadj Aïssa 50'	Soccerway report		Stadium: Stade 8 Mai 1945; Referee: Farouk Houasnia

9 April 2010 Round 22	USM Alger	2–0	ES Sétif	Bologhine
16:00	Daham 64'; Hamidi 90'	Soccerway report		Stadium: Omar Hamadi Stadium; Referee: Farouk Mial

16 April 2010 Round 23	ES Sétif	2–1	USM Blida	Sétif
18:00	Metref 25' (pen.); Guedider 90+3'	Soccerway report	Harizi 39'	Stadium: Stade 8 Mai 1945; Referee: Redouane Necib

6 March 2010 Round 24	MSP Batna	0–1	ES Sétif	Batna
14:30		Soccerway report	Metref 53'	Stadium: Stade 1er Novembre 1954; Referee: Mokhtar Amalou

27 April 2010 Round 25	ES Sétif	2–0	CA Bordj Bou Arreridj	Sétif
18:00	Korbiaa 11'; Laifaoui 38'	Soccerway report		Stadium: Stade 8 Mai 1945; Referee: Mohamed Bichari

16 May 2010 Round 26	JS Kabylie	1–1	ES Sétif	Tizi Ouzou
17:00	Seguer 88'	Soccerway report	Metref 24'	Stadium: Stade 1er Novembre 1954; Referee: Sofiane Bousseter

6 April 2010 Round 27	ES Sétif	3–0	NA Hussein Dey	Sétif
18:00	Hadj Aïssa 31'; Kadri 48'; Metref 80'	Soccerway report		Stadium: Stade 8 Mai 1945; Referee: Belkacem Boumaza

19 May 2010 Round 28	ASO Chlef	3–3	ES Sétif	Chlef
17:00	Soudani 37', 66'; Rabah 70'	Soccerway report	Hemani 18'; Mekioui 67' (o.g.); Metref 80'	Stadium: Stade Mohamed Boumezrag; Referee: Farouk Houasnia

4 May 2010 Round 29	ES Sétif	1–1	USM El Harrach	Sétif
20:00	Hadj Aïssa 17'	Soccerway report	Gherbi 6'	Stadium: Stade 8 Mai 1945; Referee: Farouk Mial

13 May 2010 Round 30	CA Batna	0–1	ES Sétif	Batna
17:00		Soccerway report	Hemani 75'	Stadium: Stade 1er Novembre 1954; Referee: Mokhtar Amalou

22 May 2010 Round 31	ES Sétif	2–1	MC Alger	Sétif
17:00	Metref 7'; Hemani 16'	Soccerway report	Derrag 4'	Stadium: Stade 8 Mai 1945; Referee: Djamel Haimoudi

25 May 2010 Round 32	WA Tlemcen	2–1	ES Sétif	Tlemcen
17:00	Chaib 44'; Yaâlaoui 81'	Soccerway report	Hadj Aïssa 42'	Stadium: Stade Akid Lotfi; Referee: Mohamed Haddada

28 May 2010 Round 33	ES Sétif	3–2	MC Oran	Sétif
17:00	Hemani 55'; Metref 80'; Berguiga 90'	Soccerway report	Benatia 31', 45'	Stadium: Stade 8 Mai 1945; Attendance: 0 (close doors); Referee: Farouk Mial

31 May 2010 Round 34	JSM Béjaïa	2–2	ES Sétif	Béjaïa
17:00	Boulemdaïs 17', 26'	Soccerway report	Berguiga 22'; Hemani 41'	Stadium: Stade de l'Unité Maghrébine; Referee: Sofiane Bousseter

== Algerian Cup ==
25 December 2009 Round of 64	ES Sétif	8–1	US Doucen	Khemis El-Khechna
14:30	Ambané 1', 36'; Kadri 4', 34', 48', 69'; Bouderbal 62'; Kaddour 68'

19 February 2010 Round of 32	ES Sétif	1–0	MC Saida	Sétif
18:00	Delhoum 27'			Stadium: Stade 8 Mai 1945; Referee: Mohamed Haddada

16 March 2010 Round of 16	WA Tlemcen	1–1 (2–4 p)	ES Sétif	Tlemcen
14:00	Yaâlaoui 11'		Djediat 87'	Stadium: Stade Akid Lotfi; Referee: Mohamed Bouali

13 April 2010 Quarter-finals	ES Sétif	1–0	USM Bel Abbès	Sétif
19:00	Bencharif 10' (pen.)			Stadium: Stade 8 Mai 1945; Referee: Farouk Houasnia

21 April 2010 Semi-finals	ES Sétif	3–1	ASO Chlef	Sétif
20:45	Feham 18'; Hemani 67'; Djediat 84'		Gharbi 81'	Stadium: Stade 8 Mai 1945; Referee: Mokhtar Amalou

1 May 2010 Final	ES Sétif	3–0	CA Batna	Algiers
16:00	Metref 36', 72'; Chebana 68' (o.g.)			Stadium: Stade du 5 Juillet; Referee: Djamel Haimoudi

== Confederation Cup ==
=== Group stage ===
==== Group A ====
Team	Pld	W	D	L	GF	GA	GD	Pts	ESS	ENP	VIT	SAN
(Algeria) ES Sétif	6	3	0	3	14	9	+5	9	—	1–3	2–0	6–0
(Egypt) ENPPI	6	3	0	3	13	10	+3	9	3–4	—	3–1	4–0
(Democratic Republic of the Congo) AS Vita Club	6	3	0	3	7	7	0	9	2–1	3–0	—	1–0
(Angola) Santos	6	3	0	3	3	11	−8	9	1–0	1–0	1–0	—

Legend: Blue = home team win; Yellow = draw; Red = away team win.

19 July 2009 Matchday 1	ES Sétif (Algeria)	2–0	(Democratic Republic of the Congo) AS Vita Club	Sétif
14:00 UTC+1	Ziaya 20', 63'			Stadium: Stade 8 Mai 1945; Referee: Lassina Pare (Burkina Faso)

2 August 2009 Matchday 2	ENPPI (Egypt)	3–4	(Algeria) ES Sétif	Cairo
14:00 UTC+3	Mano 16'; El Ashriy 36'; El Mohamady 77'		Ziaya 12', 63'; Feham 52'; Metref 66'	Stadium: Petro Sport Stadium; Referee: Badr Abdel Kadir (Sudan)

16 August 2009 Matchday 3	Santos (Angola)	1–0	(Algeria) ES Sétif	Luanda
14:00 UTC+1				Stadium: Estádio dos Coqueiros; Referee: Aboubacar Bangoura (Guinea)

28 August 2009 Matchday 4	ES Sétif (Algeria)	6–0	(Angola) Santos	Sétif
14:00 UTC+1	Feham 34'; Metref 44'; Seguer 66'; Ziaya 68', 72'; Bencharif 90'			Stadium: Stade 8 Mai 1945; Referee: Ibrahim Chaibou (Niger)

13 September 2009 Matchday 5	AS Vita Club (Democratic Republic of the Congo)	2–1	(Algeria) ES Sétif	Kinshasa
14:00 UTC+1	Ilunga 45'		Ziaya 86'	Stadium: Stade des Martyrs; Referee: Slim Jedidi (Tunisia)

19 September 2009 Matchday 6	ES Sétif (Algeria)	1–3	(Egypt) ENPPI	Sétif
14:00 UTC+1	Metref 76'		Raouf 19'; Goore 36'; Issa 74'	Stadium: Stade 8 Mai 1945; Referee: Bakary Gassama (Gambia)

=== Semi-finals ===
3 October 2009 First leg	Bayelsa United (Nigeria)	1–1	(Algeria) ES Sétif	Yenagoa
14:00 UTC+1	Ojobo 69'		Ziaya 80' (pen.)	Stadium: Yenagoa Township Stadium; Referee: Mohamed Ssegonga (Uganda)

16 October 2009 Second leg	ES Sétif (Algeria)	1–0 (2–1 agg.)	(Nigeria) Bayelsa United	Sétif
14:00 UTC+1	Ziaya 11'			Stadium: Stade 8 Mai 1945; Referee: Alfred Ndinya (Kenya)

=== Final ===
29 November 2009 First leg	ES Sétif (Algeria)	2–0	(Mali) Stade Malien	Sétif
18:00 UTC+1	Ziaya 15', 80'			Stadium: Stade 8 Mai 1945; Referee: Daniel Bennett (South Africa)

5 December 2009 Second leg	Stade Malien (Mali)	2–0 (3–2 p)	(Algeria) ES Sétif	Bamako
17:00 UTC+1	B. Coulibaly 53'; Bagayoko 55' (pen.)			Stadium: Stade Modibo Kéïta; Referee: Eddy Maillet (Seychelles)
	Penalties
	Issiaka (penalty scored); M. Coulibaly (penalty scored); Koné (penalty missed); B. Coulibaly (penalty scored)		(penalty missed) Belkaïd; (penalty scored) Yekhlef; (penalty scored) Diss; (penalty missed) Seguer; (penalty missed) Djediat

== Champions League ==
=== Preliminary round ===
14 February 2010 First leg	Diables Noirs (Republic of the Congo)	3–2	(Algeria) ES Sétif	Brazzaville
15:00 UTC+1	N'Guessi 3'; Noelly 11', 13'		Djediat 16'; Hadj Aïssa 81'	Stadium: Stade Marchand; Referee: Adam Cordier (Chad)

27 February 2010 Second leg	ES Sétif (Algeria)	2–0	(Republic of the Congo) Diables Noirs	Sétif
18:00 UTC+1	Delhoum 25', 40'			Stadium: Stade 8 Mai 1945; Referee: Denis Dembele (Ivory Coast)

=== First round ===
21 March 2010 First leg	Union Douala (Cameroon)	0–2	(Algeria) ES Sétif	Douala
14:30 UTC+1			Hadj Aïssa 19'; Djediat 34'	Stadium: Stade de la Réunification; Referee: Hudu Munyemana (Rwanda)

2 April 2010 Second leg	ES Sétif (Algeria)	5–0	(Cameroon) Union Douala	Sétif
19:00 UTC+1	Hadj Aïssa 15'; Djediat 40'; Kacem 63'; Diss 72'; Ferradji 85' (pen.)			Stadium: Stade 8 Mai 1945; Referee: Koman Coulibaly (Mali)

=== Second round ===
24 April 2010 First leg	ES Sétif (Algeria)	1–0	(Zambia) Zanaco	Sétif
19:00 UTC+1	Delhoum 73'			Stadium: Stade 8 Mai 1945; Referee: Badara Diatta (Senegal)

8 May 2010 Second leg	Zanaco (Zambia)	2–2	(Algeria) ES Sétif	Lusaka
15:00 UTC+2	Sakala 53'; Nketani 78'		Hemani 61'; Hadj Aïssa 77'	Stadium: Nkoloma Stadium; Referee: Khalid Abdel Rahman (Sudan)

== Squad information ==
=== Playing statistics ===
No.	Pos	Nat	Player	Total		National 1		Algerian Cup		Confederation Cup		Champions League	
No.	Pos	Nat	Player	Apps	Goals	Apps	Goals	Apps	Goals	Apps	Goals	Apps	Goals
Goalkeepers
1	GK	(Algeria) ALG	Faouzi Chaouchi	26	0	18	0	4	0	0	0	4	0
30	GK	(Algeria) ALG	Mohamed Seghir Ferradji	29	1	16	0	1	0	10	0	2	1
12	GK	(Algeria) ALG	Boualem Mokhtar Benmalek	1	0	0	0	1	0	0	0	0	0
Defenders
5	DF	(Algeria) ALG	Smail Diss	41	2	22	1	6	0	7	0	6	1
4	DF	(Algeria) ALG	Abdelkader Laifaoui	35	3	17	3	4	0	10	0	4	0
20	DF	(Algeria) ALG	Mokhtar Megueni	11	0	8	0	2	0	0	0	1	0
17	DF	(Algeria) ALG	Slimane Raho	41	0	24	0	4	0	7	0	6	0
22	DF	(Algeria) ALG	Mohamed Yekhlef	37	0	19	0	4	0	9	0	5	0
3	DF	(Algeria) ALG	Riad Benchadi	26	0	12	0	3	0	7	0	4	0
Midfielders
6	MF	(Algeria) ALG	Farouk Belkaid	44	0	29	0	3	0	8	0	4	0
21	MF	(Algeria) ALG	Mehdi Kacem	26	1	17	0	3	0	0	0	6	1
8	MF	(Algeria) ALG	Khaled Lemmouchia	39	0	22	0	4	0	8	0	5	0
13	MF	(Algeria) ALG	Mourad Delhoum	41	4	23	0	4	1	9	0	5	3
16	MF	(Algeria) ALG	Azzedine Benchaira	13	0	12	0	1	0	0	0	0	0
23	MF	(Algeria) ALG	Hocine Metref	53	14	32	9	5	2	10	3	6	0
11	MF	(Algeria) ALG	Karim Kaddour	21	2	15	1	3	1	3	0	0	0
7	MF	(Algeria) ALG	Belkacem Zobiri	18	0	14	0	2	0	1	0	1	0
15	MF	(Algeria) ALG	Bouazza Feham	39	3	23	0	4	1	9	2	3	0
	MF	(Algeria) ALG	Sid Ali Lamri	2	0	1	0	1	0	0	0	0	0
14	MF	(Algeria) ALG	Lamouri Djediat	26	5	16	0	4	2	2	0	4	3
10	MF	(Algeria) ALG	Lazhar Hadj Aïssa	38	9	22	5	5	0	5	0	6	4
	MF	(Algeria) ALG	Younes Kadri	7	5	5	1	2	4	0	0	0	0
28	MF	(Algeria) ALG	Rafik Bouderbal	8	1	8	1	0	0	0	0	0	0
Forwards
19	FW	(Algeria) ALG	Nabil Hemani	31	13	18	11	4	1	4	0	5	1
	FW	(Algeria) ALG	Abdelmalek Ziaya	22	19	13	8	0	0	9	11	0	0
24	FW	(Cameroon) CMR	Francis Ambané	43	5	29	2	4	3	5	0	5	0
	FW	(Algeria) ALG	Hamid Berguiga	8	2	8	2	0	0	0	0	0	0
	FW	(Algeria) ALG	Ilyes Korbiaa	4	1	3	1	1	0	0	0	0	0
2	FW	(Algeria) ALG	Sofiane Bencharif	10	3	6	1	1	1	3	1	0	0
	FW	(Algeria) ALG	Abdelkhalek Guedider	2	1	2	1	0	0	0	0	0	0
Players transferred out during the season
	DF	(Algeria) ALG	Amine Aksas	4	1	1	1	0	0	3	0	0	0
18	FW	(Algeria) ALG	Mohamed Seguer	18	3	10	2	0	0	8	1	0	0

Last updated: 19 November 2017

=== Goalscorers ===
Includes all competitive matches. The list is sorted alphabetically by surname when total goals are equal.

No.	Nat	Name	Pos.	L 1	AC	CC 3	CL 1	Total
9	(Algeria)	Abdelmalek Ziaya	FW	8	0	11	0	19
23	(Algeria)	Hocine Metref	MF	9	2	3	0	14
19	(Algeria)	Nabil Hemani	FW	11	1	0	1	13
10	(Algeria)	Lazhar Hadj Aïssa	MF	5	0	0	4	9
24	(Cameroon)	Francis Ambané	FW	2	3	0	0	5
14	(Algeria)	Lamouri Djediat	MF	0	2	0	3	5
	(Algeria)	Younes Kadri	MF	1	4	0	0	5
13	(Algeria)	Mourad Delhoum	MF	0	1	0	3	4
4	(Algeria)	Abdelkader Laifaoui	DF	3	0	0	0	3
15	(Algeria)	Bouazza Feham	MF	0	1	2	0	3
2	(Algeria)	Sofiane Bencharif	FW	1	1	1	0	3
18	(Algeria)	Mohamed Seguer	FW	2	0	1	0	3
5	(Algeria)	Smail Diss	DF	1	0	0	1	2
11	(Algeria)	Karim Kaddour	MF	1	1	0	0	2
	(Algeria)	Hamid Berguiga	FW	2	0	0	0	2
	(Algeria)	Amine Aksas	DF	1	0	0	0	1
28	(Algeria)	Rafik Bouderbal	MF	1	0	0	0	1
	(Algeria)	Ilyes Korbiaa	FW	1	0	0	0	1
	(Algeria)	Abdelkhalek Guedider	FW	1	0	0	0	1
30	(Algeria)	Mohamed Seghir Ferradji	GK	0	0	0	1	1
21	(Algeria)	Mehdi Kacem	MF	0	0	0	1	1
Own Goals				1	1	0	0	2
Totals				51	17	18	14	100

== Transfers ==
=== In ===
Date	Pos	Player	From club	Transfer fee	Source
13 June 2009	GK	(Algeria) Faouzi Chaouchi	JS Kabylie	Undisclosed	
1 July 2009	MF	(Algeria) Belkacem Zobiri	(France) Louhans-Cuiseaux	Undisclosed	
27 December 2009	FW	(Algeria) Hamid Berguiga	(Brunei) DPMM FC	Undisclosed	

=== Out ===
Date	Pos	Player	To club	Transfer fee	Source
1 July 2009	GK	(Algeria) Samir Hadjaoui	JS Kabylie	Undisclosed	
23 December 2009	FW	(Algeria) Mohamed Seguer	JS Kabylie	Undisclosed	
