= 2001 South American U-17 Championship =

Campeonato Sudamericano Sub-17 Perú 2001

Tournament details
- Host country: Peru
- City: Arequipa
- Dates: 2–18 March
- Teams: 10 (from 1 confederation)
- Venues: 2 (in 1 host city)

Final positions
- Champions: Brazil (6th title)
- Runners-up: Argentina
- Third place: Paraguay
- Fourth place: Venezuela

Tournament statistics
- Matches played: 26
- Goals scored: 100 (3.85 per match)
- Top scorer: (Paraguay) Aldo Jara (6 goals)

The 2001 South American U-17 Championship (Spanish: Campeonato Sudamericano Sub-17 Perú 2001, Brazilian Portuguese: Campeonato Sul-Americano Sub-17 Peru 2001) was the 9th edition of the South American U-17 Championship, the biennial international youth football championship organised by CONMEBOL for the men's under-17 national teams of South America. It was held in Peru from 2 to 18 March 2001.

The three best teams, champions Brazil, vice-champions Argentina and third Paraguay qualified for the 2001 FIFA U-17 World Championship in Trinidad and Tobago.

== Teams ==
All ten CONMEBOL member national teams entered the tournament.

Team	Appearance	Previous best performance
Argentina	9th	Champions (1 time, 1985)
Bolivia	9th	Champions (1 time, 1986)
Brazil (holders)	9th	Champions (5 times, most recent 1999)
Chile	9th	Runners-up (1 time, 1993)
Colombia	9th	Champions (1 time, 1993)
Ecuador	8th	Third place (2 times, 1985, 1986)
Paraguay	8th	Runners-up (1 time, 1999)
Peru (hosts)	9th	
Uruguay	9th	Runners-up (1 time, 1991)
Venezuela	9th	

== Venues ==
Arequipa
Estadio Monumental de la UNSA	Estadio Melgar
Capacity: 40,000	Capacity: 15,000
2001 South American U-17 Championship is located in Peru

== First round ==
The 10 national teams were divided in 2 groups of 5 teams each. The top 2 teams qualified for the final round.

=== Group A ===
Team	Pts	M	W	D	L	GF	GC
Argentina	7	4	2	1	1	6	4
Venezuela	7	4	2	1	1	9	10
Uruguay	6	4	2	0	2	8	7
Peru (H)	4	4	1	1	2	8	8
Ecuador	4	4	1	1	2	6	8

2 March 2001

Peru	1–1	Argentina
Argüello 38' (o.g.)	Report	Rosales 1'

Estadio Monumental de la UNSA, Arequipa
Referee: Wagner Tardelli (Brazil)
2 March 2001

Uruguay	2–3	Venezuela
Aliberti 18', 36'	Report	Cordero 17' Chaurant 30' Chourio 85'

Estadio Monumental de la UNSA, Arequipa
Attendance: 9,000
Referee: Hébert Aguilera (Bolivia)

4 March 2001

Peru	1–2	Uruguay
	Report	Benítez Aliberti

Estadio Monumental de la UNSA, Arequipa
Referee: Amelio Andino (Paraguay)
4 March 2001

Argentina	2–0	Ecuador
Zabaleta 15', 55'	Report

Estadio Monumental de la UNSA, Arequipa
Referee: Eduardo Ponce (Chile)

6 March 2001

Uruguay	1–2	Argentina
Mentaste 41'	Report	López 45' Tévez 76'

Estadio Monumental de la UNSA, Arequipa
Attendance: 800
Referee: Jorge Hoyos (Colombia)
6 March 2001

Venezuela	2–2	Ecuador
Hernández 28' Rentería 44'		Tenorio 42' Esterilla 70'

Arequipa

8 March 2001

Peru	5–2	Venezuela
Farfán 14', 45', 50', 66' Guevara 27'		Cordero 59' Briceño 90+1'

Estadio Monumental de la UNSA, Arequipa
8 March 2001

Uruguay	3–1	Ecuador
Serolini Del Duca	Report

Arequipa

10 March 2001

Argentina	1–2	Venezuela
Rosales 49'	Report	Chaurant 57' Hernández 87'

Estadio Monumental de la UNSA, Arequipa
Attendance: 15,000
Referee: Eduardo Ponce (Chile)
10 March 2001

Peru	1–3	Ecuador

Estadio Monumental de la UNSA, Arequipa

=== Group B ===
Team	Pts	M	W	D	L	GF	GC
Brazil	8	4	2	2	0	13	5
Paraguay	8	4	2	2	0	12	8
Colombia	7	4	2	1	1	7	7
Bolivia	3	4	1	0	3	7	15
Chile	1	4	0	1	3	9	13

3 March 2001

Chile	3–5	Bolivia
Pinilla 6' Núñez 25' Martínez 88'	Report	H. Ortiz 5', 70' Castro 16', 65' Méndez 30'

Estadio Melgar, Arequipa
Attendance: 4,000
Referee: Segundo Díaz (Ecuador)
3 March 2001

Brazil	4–0	Colombia
Júnior 11', 16' Anderson 71' Leandro 90'	Report

Estadio Melgar, Arequipa
Attendance: 2,000
Referee: Héctor Baldassi (Argentina)

5 March 2001

Chile	3–3	Brazil

Arequipa
5 March 2001

Paraguay	4–1	Bolivia

Arequipa

7 March 2001

Paraguay	4–3	Chile
López 24' Jara 47' Barreto 54' Sánchez 90'	Report	Núñez 15' Pinilla 61', 85'

Arequipa
7 March 2001

Colombia	4–1	Bolivia
Montaño 6' García 10' Perlaza 43' Perea 72'	Report	J. Ortiz

Arequipa

9 March 2001

Colombia	1–0	Chile

Arequipa
9 March 2001

Brazil	2–2	Paraguay

Arequipa

11 March 2001

Paraguay	2–2	Colombia
López 20' Jara 44'	Report	Belalcázar 70' (pen.) Araújo 90'

Estadio Melgar, Arequipa
Attendance: 600
Referee: Olivier Viera (Uruguay)
11 March 2001

Brazil	4–0	Bolivia
Diego Anderson Nélio	Report

Arequipa

== Final round ==
The final round were played in the same system that first round, with the best 4 teams. The top 3 teams qualified for the FIFA U-17 World Cup.

Team	Pts	PJ	PG	PE	PP	GF	GC
Brazil (C)	7	3	2	1	0	5	0
Argentina	6	3	2	0	1	6	4
Paraguay	2	3	0	2	1	3	4
Venezuela	1	3	0	1	2	1	7

14 March 2001

Argentina	3–2	Paraguay
M. Pérez 44' López 47', 85'	Report	Jara 84' Brítez 89'

Arequipa
Referee: Jorge Hoyos (Colombia)
14 March 2001

Brazil	3–0	Venezuela
Alberoni 26' Leandro 72' Anderson 87'

Arequipa

16 March 2001

Argentina	3–0	Venezuela
Mascherano 64' P. Pérez 77' Menseguez 90+1'	Report

Estadio Monumental de la UNSA, Arequipa
Attendance: 1,000
Referee: Hébert Aguilera (Bolivia)
16 March 2001

Brazil	0–0	Paraguay

Arequipa

18 March 2001

Venezuela	1–1	Paraguay
Rentería 12'	Report	Jara 41'

Estadio Monumental de la UNSA, Arequipa
Attendance: 2,000
Referee: Eduardo Ponce (Chile)
18 March 2001

Argentina	0–2	Brazil
	Report	Moraes 34' Anderson 79'

Estadio Monumental de la UNSA, Arequipa
Attendance: 8,000
Referee: Olivier Viera (Uruguay)

== Winners ==
2001 South American Under-17 Football champions

Brazil
6th title

== Top goalscorers ==
Team	Players	Goals
(Paraguay)	Aldo Jara	6

== Qualified teams for FIFA U-17 World Cup ==
The following three teams from CONMEBOL qualify for the 2001 FIFA U-17 World Championship.

Team	Qualified on	Previous appearances in FIFA U-17 World Cup^{1}
Brazil	16 March 2001	7 (1985, 1987, 1989, 1991, 1995, **1997**, **1999**)
Argentina	16 March 2001	6 (1985, 1989, 1991, 1993, 1995, 1997)
Paraguay	18 March 2001	1 (1999)

^{1} Bold indicates champions for that year. Italic indicates hosts for that year.
