= 2009 CAF Confederation Cup final =

- Event: 2009 CAF Confederation Cup
ES Sétif	Stade Malien
(Algeria)	(Mali)
2	2
- Stade Malien won on penalties 3–2

First leg
ES Sétif	Stade Malien
2	0
- Date: 29 November 2009
- Venue: Stade 8 Mai 1945, Sétif
- Referee: Daniel Bennett (South Africa)

Second leg
Stade Malien	ES Sétif
2	0
- Date: 6 December 2009
- Venue: Stade du 26 Mars, Bamako
- Referee: Eddy Maillet (Seychelles)

The 2009 CAF Confederation Cup final was the final of 2009 CAF Confederation Cup, which was the 6th edition of the CAF Confederation Cup, Africa's secondary club football competition organized by the Confederation of African Football (CAF).

The final was played between ES Sétif from Algeria and Stade Malien from Mali. The winners qualified to participate in the 2010 CAF Super Cup against the winner of the 2009 CAF Champions League.

== Road to final ==
ES Sétif			Round	Stade Malien		
Opponent	Result	Legs	Preliminary rounds	Opponent	Result	Legs
Bye			Preliminary round	Bye		
(Libya) Khaleej Sirte	6–0	1–0 away, 5–0 home	First round	(Tunisia) Stade Tunisien	2–0	0–0 away, 2–0 home
(Angola) CRD Libolo	5–5 (a)	4–0 home, 1–5 away	Second round	(Algeria) JSM Béjaïa	1–1 (13–12p)	0–1 away, 1–0 home
(Mali) Djoliba AC	4–4 (4–3p)	3–1 home, 1–3 away	Play-off	(Morocco) IZ Khemisset	4–2	1–1 away, 3–1 home
Group A: Team / Pld / W / D / L / GF / GA / GD / Pts; (Algeria) ES Sétif / 6 / 3 / 0 / 3 / 14 / 9 / +5 / 9; (Egypt) ENPPI / 6 / 3 / 0 / 3 / 13 / 10 / +3 / 9; (Democratic Republic of the Congo) AS Vita Club / 6 / 3 / 0 / 3 / 7 / 7 / 0 / 9; (Angola) Santos / 6 / 3 / 0 / 3 / 3 / 11 / −8 / 9			Group stage	Group B: Team / Pld / W / D / L / GF / GA / GD / Pts; (Mali) Stade Malien / 6 / 2 / 3 / 1 / 5 / 3 / +2 / 9; (Nigeria) Bayelsa United / 6 / 3 / 0 / 3 / 9 / 6 / +3 / 9; (Angola) Primeiro de Agosto / 6 / 2 / 2 / 2 / 5 / 10 / −5 / 8; (Egypt) Haras El Hodood / 6 / 2 / 1 / 3 / 7 / 7 / 0 / 7		
Opponent	Result	Legs	Knockout stage	Opponent	Result	Legs
(Nigeria) Bayelsa United	2–1	1–1 away, 1–0 home	Semifinals	(Egypt) ENPPI	6–4	2–2 away, 4–2 home

== Match details ==
=== First leg ===
29 November 2009
18:00 UTC+1

ES Sétif (Algeria)	2 – 0	(Mali) Stade Malien
Ziaya 15', 80'	Report

Stade 8 Mai 1945, Sétif
Attendance: 25,000
Referee: Daniel Bennett (South Africa)

=== Second leg ===
5 December 2009
17:00 UTC+1

Stade Malien (Mali)	2 – 0	(Algeria) ES Sétif
B. Coulibaly 53'; Bagayoko 55' (pen.)	Report
Penalties
Issiaka (penalty scored); M. Coulibaly (penalty scored); Koné (penalty missed); B. Coulibaly (penalty scored)	3 – 2	(penalty missed) Belkaïd; (penalty scored) Yekhlef; (penalty scored) Diss; (penalty missed) Seguer; (penalty missed) Djediat

Stade Modibo Kéïta, Bamako
Attendance: 35,000
Referee: Eddy Maillet (Seychelles)
