= Anderson Costa =

Anderson Costa may refer to:

- Anderson Costa (footballer, born 1980), Anderson José de Jesus Costa, Brazilian football striker
- Anderson Costa (footballer, born 1984), Brazilian football forward
