= Gabriele Perico =

Italian footballer

Personal information
- Full name: Gabriele Perico
- Date of birth: 11 March 1984 (age 42)
- Place of birth: Bergamo, Italy
- Height: 1.83 m (6 ft 0 in)
- Position: Right back

Youth career
- Atalanta

Senior career*
Years	Team	Apps	(Gls)
2003–2004	Prato	12	(0)
2004–2010	AlbinoLeffe	68	(11)
2006–2007	→ Monza (loan)	36	(0)
2010–2014	Cagliari	78	(0)
2014–2016	Cesena	56	(3)
2016–2018	Salernitana	36	(1)
2018	Livorno	11	(0)
2019	Chiasso	17	(0)
2019–2020	Virtus Bergamo	21	(1)
Total		335	(16)

International career
2000–2001	Italy U17	10	(0)
2002	Italy U18	6	(1)
2002–2003	Italy U19	10	(2)
2004	Italy U20	6	(0)
- * Club domestic league appearances and goals

Gabriele Perico (born 11 March 1984) is an Italian former professional footballer who played as a right back. He is a former Italy U20 international.

== Club career ==
Perico started his career at hometown club Atalanta. In the 2003–04 season he left for Prato.

=== AlbinoLeffe ===
In summer 2004, he was signed by Serie B side AlbinoLeffe from Prato along with Mauro Belotti and Alessandro Diamanti. The Province of Bergamo based club, also signed Primavera teammate Joelson (in a co-ownership deal) and Mauro Minelli (on loan) from Atalanta.

He made his Serie B debut for AlbinoLeffe in a 2–0 victory against Venezia, on 11 September 2004.

=== Cagliari ===
On 9 August 2010 Perico joined Cagliari along with Simon Laner on loan for €750,000 (€375,000 each or €350,000 each plus Cocco) with option to co-own the players.

On 21 June 2011 Cagliari excised the rights to sign the player in co-ownership deal for €375,000 in a 3-year contract. Cagliari also bought back Cocco for €150,000. In June 2012 Cagliari acquired Perico outright for €200,000, but Cocco also acquired by AlbinoLeffe outright for €200,000. The deals made Cagliari paid €950,000 to AlbinoLeffe for Perico, or €725,000 cash plus signing Cocco twice.

=== Cesena ===
On 16 July 2014, Perico signed for Serie A side Cesena. After being relegated from Serie A after the 2014/15 season, Cesena finished 6th in Serie B during the 2015/16 season. He was released at the end of the 2015/16 season, after making 56 appearances and scoring 3 goals for the club.

In July 2016, Perico joined English side Leeds United on trial. He played for Leeds first team in their final preseason friendly against Serie A side Atalanta B.C. where he started in a 2–1 win. However, he failed to earn a permanent deal at the club.

=== Salernitana ===
On 31 August he joined Serie B club Salernitana on a free transfer. He signed a 2-year contract.

=== FC Chiasso ===
On 4 January 2019, Perico signed with FC Chiasso in Switzerland.

== International career ==
Perico has represented Italy at various age groups including Italy U20's. He also won the 2003 UEFA European Under-19 Championship. Perico was capped for the Italy under-17 team at 2001 UEFA European Under-16 Championship (after 2001 the tournament was renamed the under-17 championship, but with the same age limit).

== Honours ==
=== International ===
Italy Under-19

- UEFA European Under-19 Championship: 2003
