= Drago Papa =

Croatian footballer (born 1984)

Personal information
- Date of birth: 9 February 1984 (age 42)
- Place of birth: Vrbovec, SR Croatia, SFR Yugoslavia
- Height: 1.65 m (5 ft 5 in)
- Position: Midfielder

Team information
- Current team: NK Farkaš
- Number: 7

Youth career
- Vrbovec
- 2001–2002: Dinamo Zagreb

Senior career*
Years	Team	Apps	(Gls)
2000–2003	Dinamo Zagreb	0	(0)
2002–2003	→ Croatia Sesvete (loan)	14	(3)
2003–2005	Kamen Ingrad	43	(3)
2005–2009	Varteks	83	(2)
2009–2011	Slaven Belupo	16	(1)
2011–2012	Gorica	8	(0)
2012–2015	Vrbovec	35	(15)
2015–2017	SV Eberau	60	(5)
2017–2022	NK Tomislav Radnik		
2022-2024	Vrbovec		
2024–	NK Farkaš Farkaševac		

International career^{‡}
1999	Croatia U15	2	(1)
2001	Croatia U16	4	(0)
2000–2001	Croatia U17	11	(1)
2002	Croatia U19	1	(0)
2002–2004	Croatia U20	11	(0)
2000–2005	Croatia U21	5	(0)
- * Club domestic league appearances and goals as of 5 November 2022 ‡ National team caps and goals as of 13 March 2012

Drago Papa (born 9 February 1984) is a Croatian footballer.

== Club career ==
A product of Dinamo Zagreb academy, Papa never managed to break into the first team and he had his professional debut at Croatia Sesvete, where he was on loan in the 2002–03 season. He was released by Dinamo in 2003 and then went on to play for Prva HNL sides Kamen Ingrad and Varteks, Slaven Belupo before joining HNK Gorica in August 2011 on a free transfer. He played his first game for HNK Gorica on 28 August 2011, in a match against NK Vinogradar. He was subbed in the sixty-ninth minute. He made his first assist on 10 October 2011, in a match against NK Pomorac. After failing to impress during first half of season in HNK Gorica, he was released and eventually signed for his hometown club NK Vrbovec. He had a spell with SV Eberau later in his career.

== International career ==
Internationally, Papa played a total of 34 games and scored 2 goals for various Croatia national youth teams. He represented Croatia at the 2001 UEFA European U-16 Championship and the 2001 FIFA U-17 World Championship.
