= Evelio Hernández =

Evelio Hernández may refer to:

- Evelio Hernández (baseball) (1931–2015), Cuban baseball player
- Evelio Hernández (footballer) (born 1984), Venezuelan footballer
