= Mauro Belotti =

Italian footballer (born 1984)

Personal information
- Date of birth: 13 May 1984 (age 42)
- Place of birth: Trescore Balneario, Italy
- Height: 1.83 m (6 ft 0 in)
- Position: Centre back

Youth career
- Atalanta

Senior career*
Years	Team	Apps	(Gls)
2004	Prato	10	(1)
2004–2009	AlbinoLeffe	0	(0)
2004–2005	→ Prato (loan)	20	(1)
2006–2007	→ Pergocrema (loan)	30	(2)
2007–2008	→ Pavia (loan)	32	(2)
2009	South Tyrol	14	(1)
2009–2011	Rodengo Saiano	54	(3)
2011–2012	Savona	35	(1)
2012–2013	Albinoleffe	30	(1)
2013–2016	Lumezzane	77	(5)
2016–2017	Caratese	17	(2)
2017–2019	Pro Piacenza	56	(1)
2019–2020	Ciliverghe	17	(0)
2020–2021	AC Ardor Lazzate 1973		
2021–2022	GS Vertovese		
2022	Atletico Castegnato		
2022	Valcalepio FC		
2023	AC Leon		
2023–2024	Ciliverghe		
2024–2025	Atletico Castegnato		
Total		392	(20)

International career
2000	Italy U15	13	(1)
2000–2001	Italy U16	15	(1)
2002	Italy U18	6	(0)
2002–2003	Italy U19	13	(1)
2005	Italy Mediterranean	2	(0)

Managerial career
- 2025–2026: Rovato Calcio
- 2026–: Pro Palazzolo
- * Club domestic league appearances and goals

Mauro Belotti (born 13 May 1984) is an Italian manager and former footballer who is currently as a head coach for Italian Serie D club Pro Palazzolo.

== Club career ==
Born in Trescore Balneario, the Province of Bergamo, Belotti started his career at hometown club Atalanta Bergamo and finished as 2001–02 Campionato Nazionale Primavera runner-up. He was the right midfielder of the team.

Belotti was awarded no.33 of the first team in 2003–04 season. But remained as a player of the youth team. In January 2004, he left for Prato and joined Primavera teammate Gabriele Perico. In summer 2004, he was signed by Serie B side AlbinoLeffe along with Perico and Alessandro Diamanti from Prato. The Province of Bergamo based club, also signed Primavera teammate Joelson (in co-ownership deal) and Mauro Minelli (on loan) from Atalanta.

In the same transfer window, he was loaned back to Prato for a season. In 2005–06 season, he was awarded no.33 shirt of AlbinoLeffe but failed to make any league appearances. he then left for Pergocrema and Pavia.

His no.33 shirt was taken by Francesco Renzetti in 2008–09 season, made him without a club number, and Belotti left for Lega Pro (ex-Serie C) again in January 2009, this time for South Tyrol.

In 2009–10 season, he left for Lega Pro Seconda Divisione side Rodengo Saiano.

In 2011–12 season he plays in the Savona files; the following year he joined AlbinoLeffe.

Since the summer of 2013 will play for three seasons, for Lumezzane.

In July 2016 he was hired by the amateur team Folgore Caratese; on 17 January 2017 back in professional football moved to Pro Piacenza.

== International career ==
Belotti was the member of Italy U16 squad at 2001 UEFA European Under-16 Football Championship (now a U-17 event). He also won 2003 UEFA European Under-19 Football Championship, which the team included Atalanta teammate Giampaolo Pazzini, Gabriele Perico and Simone Padoin.

In 2005, he was called to Italy U-21 B team specially for 2005 Mediterranean Games and for a preparation match against Serie D Best XI before the tournament. He played his only match with the team against Libya.
