= Femi Opabunmi =

Nigerian footballer

Personal information
- Date of birth: 3 March 1985 (age 41)
- Place of birth: Lagos, Nigeria
- Height: 1.70 m (5 ft 7 in)
- Position: Left winger

Senior career*
Years	Team	Apps	(Gls)
2001	Shooting Stars		
2001–2004	Grasshopper	14	(0)
2004	Hapoel Be'er Sheva	11	(1)
2004–2006	Niort	7	(0)
2006	Shooting Stars		

International career
2001	Nigeria U17	6	(6)
2002–2003	Nigeria	6	(1)
- * Club domestic league appearances and goals

Femi Opabunmi (born 3 March 1985) is a Nigerian former professional footballer who played as a left winger.

== Club career ==
Opabunmi studied at Methodist High School Ibadan and played for the Methodist High School Ibadan Old Boys. He played for a few clubs, including Shooting Stars FC, Grasshoppers Zürich (Switzerland), Hapoel Be'er Sheva in Israel, and Chamois Niortais in France.

He retired from football in 2006 due to serious glaucoma. He is now totally blind in the right eye.

Opabunmi is now the Head Coach of a Football academy in Iwo, Osun State, Alamu Football Academy, the first free football academy which is set to participate in the Nigerian Premier league.

== International career ==
Opabunmi scored a goal to help Nigeria win the African U-17 Championships in 2001. With Collins Osunwa out with injury he became Nigeria's key player at 2001 FIFA U-17 World Championship where he scored a hat-trick against Australia and won him the Silver Shoe as second highest goalscorer and also the Bronze Ball as third best player in the tournament, helping Nigeria to reach the final where they lost to France. He attracted attention from clubs such as Manchester United, Lyon and Celta Vigo.

He played for Nigeria and made his debut in 2002 against Kenya scoring the second goal in a 3–0 win. He was a participant at the 2002 FIFA World Cup playing against England in the last group stage match becoming the third youngest player to ever play in the World Cup finals after Norman Whiteside and Samuel Eto'o. Thereafter, he was a starter in Nigeria's next match after the World Cup in the 2004 African Cup of Nations qualification against Angola and played for the Super Eagles on two more occasions in 2003. Opabunmi shared his football insights during the ongoing World Cup tournament. Drawing parallels with his own experience as a teenage debutant in 2002, he praised the impact of 18-year-old Moroccan midfielder Ayyoub Bouaddi and predicted a successful campaign for the North African side following their group-stage performance against Brazil.
