= Mauro Minelli =

Italian footballer

Personal information
- Date of birth: 2 April 1981 (age 45)
- Place of birth: San Giovanni Bianco, Italy
- Height: 1.86 m (6 ft 1 in)
- Position: Centre back

Senior career*
Years	Team	Apps	(Gls)
2001–2002	Atalanta	0	(0)
2001–2002	→ Lumezzane (loan)	33	(2)
2003–2004	Verona	34	(2)
2004–2006	AlbinoLeffe	76	(5)
2006–2009	Catania	10	(1)
2008–2009	→ Triestina (loan)	58	(6)
2009–2011	Sassuolo	58	(0)
2011	Frosinone	16	(1)
2011–2014	Cremonese	46	(6)
2014–2020	Ciliverghe	152	(10)
2020–2021	SSD Città di Albino		
Total		483	(33)

International career
2002	Italy U20	6	(0)
- * Club domestic league appearances and goals

Mauro Minelli (born 2 April 1981) is an Italian former professional footballer who plays as a centre back.

== Football career ==
Minelli started his career in Atalanta, the most famous club near his birthplace. He spent 2001–02 season at Lumezzane along with Roberto Previtali. That season he also capped for Italy national under-20 football team at the Under-20 Four Nations Tournament.

In January 2003, he was signed by Verona in co-ownership deal, in exchange with Natale Gonnella. In June 2004, he was bought back by Atalanta but he was loaned to AlbinoLeffe in July, re-joining (former) Atalanta team-mate Mauro Belotti, Joelson, Gabriele Perico and Previtali. In July 2005, AlbinoLeffe bought half of the contractual rights, but bought back by Atalanta again in June 2006.

This time Calcio Catania bought half of its contractual rights in July 2006, where he played his first Serie A season since made his debut against ACF Fiorentina on 1 October 2006.

After he failed to make any appearances in either Coppa Italia or 2007–08 Serie A, he left on loan to Triestina in January 2008 for another Serie B season. The loan was extended in August.

In June 2009 he returned to Calcio Catania after the club acquired the full rights from Atalanta, but was immediately sold back into the Serie B with Sassuolo on 9 July 2009. He announced he would leave the club in January 2011 in order to play more regularly; he joined fellow Serie B team Frosinone on 31 January, rejoining team-mate Gaetano Masucci. Antonio Bocchetti also moved from Frosinone to Sassuolo as part of the deal.

After Frosinone relegated to Lega Pro Prima Divisione, he joined fellow Prima Divisione team Cremonese.

Although he was on the 2012–13 squad, he did not play any games in 2012–13 Lega Pro Prima Divisione.

His contract was renewed on 3 July 2013.
