= Joelson (footballer, born 1983) =

Brazilian footballer (born 1983)

Personal information
- Full name: Joelson José Inácio
- Date of birth: 10 July 1983 (age 43)
- Place of birth: Ibitinga, Brazil
- Height: 1.80 m (5 ft 11 in)
- Position: Forward

Team information
- Current team: Real Calepina (head coach)

Youth career
- Atalanta

Senior career*
Years	Team	Apps	(Gls)
2002–2003	Atalanta	0	(0)
2002–2003	→ Pavia (loan)	28	(6)
2003–2004	Pavia	31	(8)
2004–2007	AlbinoLeffe	75	(8)
2007–2010	Reggina	12	(1)
2008–2009	→ Pisa (loan)	27	(7)
2009–2010	→ Grosseto (loan)	26	(4)
2010–2011	Benevento	11	(0)
2011	Cremonese	11	(2)
2011–2012	Pergocrema	18	(1)
2012	Siena	0	(0)
2015–2016	Lecco	19	(3)
2016–2017	Pontisola	24	(8)
2017–2018	Caravaggio	24	(1)
2018–2019	Ciliverghe Mazzano	18	(2)
2019–2020	Lemine Almenno		
2020–2021	Mapello		

Managerial career
- 2021–2022: Mapello
- 2023–2025: AC Leon
- 2025–: Real Calepina
- * Club domestic league appearances and goals as of 12:10, 11 April 2020 (UTC)

Joelson José Inácio (born 10 July 1983), known as just Joelson, is a Brazilian footballer who played as a forward, and current head coach of Serie D club Real Calepina.

== Career ==
Born in Brazil, Joelson started his professional career in Italy along with his elder brother Piá. He finished as 2001–02 Campionato Nazionale Primavera runner–up with Atalanta under-20 youth team. In 2002–03 season, he left for Pavia on loan with option to co-own the player. In June 2004, Atalanta bought back Joelson and sold him to nearby club AlbinoLeffe in another co-ownership deal, where he joined loan with ex-Primavera teammate Mauro Belotti, Gabriele Perico and Mauro Minelli who recent bought back by Atalanta. In June 2005 AlbinoLeffe signed Joelson outright. Since January 2007 he did not play for AlbinoLeffe as he signed a pre-contract with his new club.

=== Reggina ===
He joined Reggina on free transfer while his contract expire with AlbinoLeffe. He played as backup of Nicola Amoruso, Fabio Ceravolo and Stephen Makinwa, only made four starts.

In 2008–09, he left for Serie B side Pisa, but the club was relegated and later bankrupted.

He returned to Reggina after the club was relegated from Serie A. He played once before leaving for fellow Serie B club Grosseto.

=== Lega Pro clubs ===
In mid-2010 he left for Benevento. In January 2011 he was signed by Cremonese along with Gabriele Aldegani. As part of the deal, Marco Paoloni, moved to Benevento. He became free agent in 2011 and in November rejoined his brother Piá in Pergocrema. The brother also qualified as youth coach in summer 2011. On 24 August 2012 he was signed by Siena as a free agent, however for non-EU quota trade.

In September 2012 he was banned for 2 1/2 years for involvement in the 2011–12 Italian football scandal.

=== Lecco ===
In January 2015, Serie D club Lecco signed Joelson.

=== Final years as amateur ===
In December 2019, Joelson moved to Italian fifth tier, Eccellenza, club ASD Lemine Almenno Calcio.

He successively spent the 2020–21 season with Eccellenza club Mapello, coached by his friend and former teammate Vinicio Espinal.

== Coaching career ==
In July 2021, following the departure of Espinal to join Lazio as part of their coaching staff, Eccellenza Lombardy amateurs Mapello appointed Joelson as their new head coach.

On 1 December 2022, he was sacked by Mapello, leaving the club in second place in the league table.

In May 2023, Vimercate-based Eccellenza amateur club AC Leon announced the appointment of Joelson as their new head coach for the 2023–24 season, being eventually dismissed in February 2025 after a negative string of results.

In May 2025, he was unveiled as the new head coach of Serie D club Real Calepina.
