= 2001 UEFA European Under-16 Championship =

2001 UEFA Under-16 Championship
Tournament details
- Host country: England
- Dates: 22 April – 6 May
- Teams: 16 (from 1 confederation)
- Venues: 16 (in 18 host cities)

Final positions
- Champions: Spain (6th title)
- Runners-up: France
- Third place: Croatia
- Fourth place: England

Tournament statistics
- Matches played: 32
- Goals scored: 90 (2.81 per match)
- Top scorer: (Spain) Fernando Torres (7 goals)
- Best player: (Spain) Fernando Torres

The 2001 UEFA European Under-16 Championship was the 19th edition of UEFA's European Under-16 Football Championship. It was the last under-16 championship, before changing the name as under-17 championships. England hosted the championship, during 22 April – 6 May. Players born on or after 1 January 1984 were eligible to participate in this competition. 16 teams entered the competition, and Spain defeated France in the final to win the competition for the sixth time.

== Match officials ==
| Country | Referee | Assistant referees | Fourth officials | Matches refereed |
|---|---|---|---|---|
| Belarus | None | Vyacheslav Bykov | None | |
| Bosnia and Herzegovina | Siniša Zrnić | None | None | Italy–Switzerland (Group C) |
| Bulgaria | Dimitar Dimitrov | None | None | Romania–Spain (Group A); England–Switzerland (Group C); Scotland–Croatia (Group D) |
| Croatia | None | Tomislav Petrović | None | |
| Czech Republic | None | Miroslav Zlámal | None | |
| England | Andy D'Urso | David Babski; Carl Bassingdale; Glenn Turner | Richard Beeby; Mark Clattenburg; Keith Hill | France–Croatia (Group D); Spain–Italy (Quarter-final); France–Spain (Final) |
| Greece | Athanasios Briakos | None | None | Spain–Germany (Group A); Poland–Russia (Group B) |
| Hungary | None | Robert Kispál | None | |
| Iceland | Kristinn Jakobsson | None | None | Croatia–Finland (Group D); England–Germany (Quarter-final) |
| Israel | Alon Yefet | None | None | Turkey–Russia (Group B); France–Scotland (Group D); Turkey–Croatia (Quarter-final); Spain–Croatia (Semi-final) |
| Norway | None | Steinar Holvik | None | |
| Poland | Grzegorz Gilewski | None | None | Spain–Belgium (Group A); Switzerland–Hungary (Group C); England–France (Semi-final) |
| Portugal | None | Paulo Ribeiro | None | |
| Romania | Alexandru Tudor | None | None | Not known |
| Seychelles | Eddy Maillet | None | None | France–Russia (Quarter-final) |
| South Africa | None | Lazarus Matela | None | |
| Sweden | Martin Hansson | None | None | Russia–Netherlands (Group B); Scotland–Finland (Group D); Croatia–England (Third place play-off) |
| Switzerland | None | Francesco Buragina | None | |
| (Federal Republic of Yugoslavia) Yugoslavia | None | Vitomir Simović | None | |

== Group stage ==
=== Group A ===
| Teams | GP | W | D | L | GF | GA | GD | Pts |
|---|---|---|---|---|---|---|---|---|
| Spain | 3 | 2 | 0 | 1 | 8 | 2 | +6 | 6 |
| Germany | 3 | 2 | 0 | 1 | 11 | 4 | +7 | 6 |
| Belgium | 3 | 2 | 0 | 1 | 4 | 6 | –2 | 6 |
| Romania | 3 | 0 | 0 | 3 | 2 | 13 | –11 | 0 |

| Teams | GP | W | D | L | GF | GA | GD | Pts |
|---|---|---|---|---|---|---|---|---|
| Spain | 2 | 1 | 0 | 1 | 5 | 2 | +3 | 3 |
| Germany | 2 | 1 | 0 | 1 | 3 | 2 | +1 | 3 |
| Belgium | 2 | 1 | 0 | 1 | 2 | 6 | –4 | 3 |

22 April 2001
15:00

| Romania | 0–3 | Spain |
|---|---|---|
| | Report | Melli 27'; Gavilán 33'; Torres 59' |

New Ferens Park, Durham
Referee: Dimitar Dimitrov (Bulgaria)
22 April 2001
18:30

| Germany | 1–2 | Belgium |
|---|---|---|
| Trochowski 90' | Report | Maxence Coveliers 66'; Vandendriessche 79' |

New Ferens Park, Durham

24 April 2001
18:30

| Romania | 2–8 | Germany |
|---|---|---|
| Velcovici 29'; Oprea 55' (pen.) | Report | Odonkor 7'; Trochowski 10'; Kılıçaslan 17', 33', 59'; Petereit 65'; Ochs 79'; Madejski 80' |

Feethams, Darlington
24 April 2001
18:30

| Spain | 5–0 | Belgium |
|---|---|---|
| Flaño 2'; Torres 10', 38'; Gavilán 50'; Bauzà 62' | Report |

New Ferens Park, Durham
Referee: Grzegorz Gilewski (Poland)

26 April 2001
18:30

| Belgium | 2–0 | Romania |
|---|---|---|
| Kristof Goessens 33'; Vandendriessche 54' | Report |

Billington, Billingham
26 April 2001
18:30

| Spain | 0–2 | Germany |
|---|---|---|
| | Report | Trochowski 15'; Di Gregorio 58' |

New Ferens Park, Durham
Attendance: 200
Referee: Athanasios Briakos (Greece)

=== Group B ===
| Teams | GP | W | D | L | GF | GA | GD | Pts |
|---|---|---|---|---|---|---|---|---|
| Turkey | 3 | 2 | 0 | 1 | 3 | 2 | +1 | 6 |
| Russia | 3 | 1 | 2 | 0 | 1 | 0 | +1 | 5 |
| Netherlands | 3 | 1 | 1 | 1 | 2 | 1 | +1 | 4 |
| Poland | 3 | 0 | 1 | 2 | 1 | 4 | –3 | 1 |

23 April 2001
18:30

| Netherlands | 0–1 | Turkey |
|---|---|---|
| | Report | Dündar Denizhan 57' |

South Leeds Stadium, Leeds
23 April 2001
18:30

| Poland | 0–0 | Russia |
|---|---|---|
| | Report |

Boothferry Park, Hull
Attendance: 1,125
Referee: Athanasios Briakos (Greece)

25 April 2001
18:30

| Netherlands | 2–0 | Poland |
|---|---|---|
| Ralf De Haan 22', 53' | Report |

Bootham Crescent, York
25 April 2001
18:30

| Turkey | 0–1 | Russia |
|---|---|---|
| | Report | Gerk 36' |

Boothferry Park, Hull
Attendance: 746
Referee: Alon Yefet (Israel)

27 April 2001
18:30

| Russia | 0–0 | Netherlands |
|---|---|---|
| | Report |

Bootham Crescent, York
Attendance: 689
Referee: Martin Hansson (Sweden)
27 April 2001
18:30

| Turkey | 2–1 | Poland |
|---|---|---|
| Sezgin Yılmaz 37'; Sarıoğlu 43' | Report | Marek Wasicki 68' |

South Leeds Stadium, Leeds

=== Group C ===
| Teams | GP | W | D | L | GF | GA | GD | Pts |
|---|---|---|---|---|---|---|---|---|
| England | 3 | 2 | 0 | 1 | 4 | 3 | +1 | 6 |
| Italy | 3 | 1 | 1 | 1 | 7 | 6 | +1 | 4 |
| Switzerland | 3 | 1 | 1 | 1 | 3 | 4 | –1 | 4 |
| Hungary | 3 | 1 | 0 | 2 | 5 | 6 | –1 | 3 |

22 April 2001
15:00

| Switzerland | 2–1 | Hungary |
|---|---|---|
| Tsimba 49', 56' | Report | Kanta 27' (pen.) |

The Shay, Halifax
Attendance: 150
Referee: Grzegorz Gilewski (Poland)
22 April 2001
16:00

| England | 1–3 | Italy |
|---|---|---|
| Welsh 22' | Report | Facchinetti 60'; Pazzini 64' (?) |

Bramall Lane, Sheffield

24 April 2001
18:30

| England | 2–0 | Switzerland |
|---|---|---|
| E. Johnson 56'; Schumacher 79' | Report |

Alfred McAlpine Stadium, Huddersfield
Attendance: 2,651
Referee: Dimitar Dimitrov (Bulgaria)
24 April 2001
18:30

| Italy | 3–4 | Hungary |
|---|---|---|
| Lodi 30', 57'; Pazzini 65' | Report | Kanta 20', 51'; Müller 40'; Mihály Horváth 76' |

Wetherby Road, Harrogate

26 April 2001
18:30

| Hungary | 0–1 | England |
|---|---|---|
| | Report | G. Johnson 22' |

Alfred McAlpine Stadium, Huddersfield
Attendance: 3,440
26 April 2001
18:30

| Italy | 1–1 | Switzerland |
|---|---|---|
| Lodi 22' | Report | Joël Gasche 43' |

South Leeds Stadium, Leeds
Attendance: 750
Referee: Siniša Zrnić (Bosnia and Herzegovina)

=== Group D ===
| Teams | GP | W | D | L | GF | GA | GD | Pts |
|---|---|---|---|---|---|---|---|---|
| France | 3 | 3 | 0 | 0 | 11 | 0 | +11 | 9 |
| Croatia | 3 | 2 | 0 | 1 | 3 | 3 | 0 | 6 |
| Scotland | 3 | 1 | 0 | 2 | 3 | 5 | –2 | 3 |
| Finland | 3 | 0 | 0 | 3 | 1 | 10 | –9 | 0 |

23 April 2001
18:30

| France | 3–0 | Scotland |
|---|---|---|
| Sinama Pongolle 14', 54'; Le Tallec 75' | Report |

Oakwell Stadium, Barnsley
Attendance: 703
Referee: Alon Yefet (Israel)
23 April 2001
18:30

| Croatia | 2–0 | Finland |
|---|---|---|
| Kranjčar 45', 67' | Report |

Glanford Park, Scunthorpe
Attendance: 731
Referee: Kristinn Jakobsson (Iceland)

25 April 2001
18:30

| France | 3–0 | Croatia |
|---|---|---|
| Sinama Pongolle 37', 55', 64' (pen.) | Report |

Wetherby Road, Harrogate
Attendance: 289
Referee: Andy D'Urso (England)
25 April 2001
18:30

| Scotland | 3–1 | Finland |
|---|---|---|
| Weir 31'; McLaughlin 54' (pen.); Beattie 57' | | Tommi Peltonen 76' |

Oakwell Stadium, Barnsley
Attendance: 538
Referee: Martin Hansson (Sweden)

27 April 2001
18:30

| Finland | 0–5 | France |
|---|---|---|
| | Report | Le Tallec 17', 58'; Sofiane 37'; Grax 44', 80' |

Blundell Park, Grimsby
Referee: Alexandru Tudor (Romania)
27 April 2001
18:30

| Scotland | 0–1 | Croatia |
|---|---|---|
| | Report | Ivan Grivičić 40' |

Sandy Lane, Worksop
Attendance: 150
Referee: Dimitar Dimitrov (Bulgaria)

== Knockout stage ==
Quarter-finals
29 April – Sunderland
Spain (p) | 1 (4)
Italy | 1 (3)
30 April – Scunthorpe
Turkey | 0
Croatia | 2
29 April – Middlesbrough
England (p) | 1 (5)
Germany | 1 (3)
30 April – York
France | 2
Russia | 0

Semi-finals
3 May – Middlesbrough
Spain | 3
Croatia | 0
3 May – Newcastle
England | 0
France | 4

Final
6 May – Sunderland
France | 0
Spain | 1
Third place
6 May – Durham
Croatia | 4
England | 1

=== Quarter-finals ===
29 April 2001
15:00

| Spain | 1–1 | Italy |
|---|---|---|
| Torres 26' (pen.) | Report | Belotti 46' |
Penalties
| Senel (penalty scored); Carlos (penalty scored); Melli (penalty scored); Torres (penalty scored) | 4–3 | (penalty missed) Belotti; (penalty scored) Aquilani; (penalty scored) Mantovani; (penalty scored) De Crescenzo; (penalty missed) Lodi |

Stadium of Light, Sunderland
Attendance: 500
Referee: Andy D'Urso (England)

29 April 2001
15:00

| England | 1–1 | Germany |
|---|---|---|
| Samba 66' | Report | Laas 68' |
Penalties
| Schumacher (penalty scored); Welsh (penalty scored); Westcarr (penalty scored); Bowditch (penalty scored); Hoyte (penalty scored) | 5–3 | (penalty scored) (penalty scored) (penalty scored); (penalty missed) Berkigt |

Riverside Stadium, Middlesbrough
Attendance: 4,138
Referee: Kristinn Jakobsson (Iceland)

30 April 2001
18:30

| Turkey | 0–2 | Croatia |
|---|---|---|
| | Report | Prijić 43'; Čale 66' |

Glanford Park, Scunthorpe
Attendance: 1,679
Referee: Alon Yefet (Israel)

30 April 2001
18:30

| France | 2–0 | Russia |
|---|---|---|
| Meghni 23', 57' | Report |

Bootham Crescent, York
Attendance: 557
Referee: Eddy Maillet (Seychelles)

=== Semi-finals ===
3 May 2001
18:30

| Spain | 3–0 | Croatia |
|---|---|---|
| Torres 47', 70'; Senel 53' | Report |

Riverside Stadium, Middlesbrough
Attendance: 5,300
Referee: Alon Yefet (Israel)

3 May 2001
18:30

| England | 0–4 | France |
|---|---|---|
| | Report | Le Tallec 2', 77'; Sinama Pongolle 4', 72' |

St James' Park, Newcastle
Attendance: 30,160
Referee: Grzegorz Gilewski (Poland)

=== Third place play-off ===
6 May 2001
12:00

| Croatia | 4–1 | England |
|---|---|---|
| Ružak 7'; Papa 17'; Grgurović 70'; Grivičić 77' | Report | G. Johnson 57' |

New Ferens Park, Durham
Attendance: 400
Referee: Martin Hansson (Sweden)

=== Final ===
6 May 2001
15:00

| France | 0–1 | Spain |
|---|---|---|
| | Report | Torres 76' (pen.) |

Stadium of Light, Sunderland
Attendance: 31,100
Referee: Andy D'Urso (England)

== Statistics ==
=== Goalscorers ===
7 goals

- (Spain) Fernando Torres

6 goals

- (France) Florent Sinama Pongolle

5 goals

- (France) Anthony Le Tallec

3 goals

- (Germany) Erdal Kılıçaslan
- (Germany) Piotr Trochowski
- (Hungary) József Kanta
- (Italy) Francesco Lodi
- (Italy) Giampaolo Pazzini

2 goals

- (Belgium) Wouter Vandendriessche
- (Croatia) Ivan Grivičić
- (Croatia) Niko Kranjčar
- (England) Glen Johnson
- (France) Sébastien Grax
- (France) Mourad Meghni
- (France) Youssef Sofiane
- (Netherlands) Ralf de Haan
- (Spain) Jaime Gavilán
- (Switzerland) Cédric Tsimba

1 goal

- (Belgium) Maxence Coveliers
- (Belgium) Kristof Goessens
- (Croatia) Hrvoje Čale
- (Croatia) Mario Grgurović
- (Croatia) Drago Papa
- (Croatia) Dejan Prijić
- (Croatia) Igor Ružak
- (England) Eddie Johnson
- (England) Cherno Samba
- (England) Steven Schumacher
- (England) John Welsh
- (Finland) Tommi Peltonen
- (Germany) Baldo di Gregorio
- (Germany) Alexander Laas
- (Germany) Oliver Madejski
- (Germany) Patrick Ochs
- (Germany) David Odonkor
- (Germany) Christian Petereit
- (Hungary) Mihály Horváth
- (Hungary) Zsolt Müller
- (Italy) Mauro Belotti
- (Italy) Paolo Facchinetti
- (Poland) Marek Wasicki
- (Romania) Rareş Tudor Oprea
- (Romania) Gabriel Velcovici
- (Russia) Anatoli Gerk
- (Scotland) Craig Beattie
- (Scotland) Paul McLaughlin
- (Scotland) Graham Weir
- (Spain) Guillem Bauzà
- (Spain) Melli
- (Spain) Miguel Flaño
- (Spain) Senel
- (Switzerland) Joël Gasche
- (Turkey) Dündar Denizhan
- (Turkey) Sabri
- (Turkey) Sezgin Yilmaz
