= Oswaldo Chaurant =

Venezuelan football manager (born 1984)

Personal information
- Full name: Oswaldo José Chaurant Arreaza
- Date of birth: 27 May 1984 (age 42)
- Place of birth: Ciudad Guayana, Venezuela
- Height: 1.83 m (6 ft 0 in)
- Positions: Left-back; midfielder

Youth career
- Trujillanos

Senior career*
Years	Team	Apps	(Gls)
2004–2007	Trujillanos	58	(2)
2007	Guaros	13	(1)
2008	Trujillanos	8	(0)
2008–2009	Zamora	43	(13)
2010	Mineros	13	(0)
2011	Deportivo Táchira	8	(0)
2012–2013	Carabobo	9	(2)
2014–2018	Deportivo Lara	104	(1)
2019	Universidad Central		
2020	LALA	5	(1)

International career
2001	Venezuela U17		

Managerial career
- 2022–2023: Trujillanos (assistant)
- 2023–2026: Trujillanos
- * Club domestic league appearances and goals

Oswaldo José Chaurant Arreaza (born 27 May 1984) is a Venezuelan football manager and former player who played as either a left-back or a midfielder.

== Club career ==
Chaurant was born in Ciudad Guayana, and made his senior debut with Trujillanos in 2004. He moved to Guaros in 2007, before returning to his former club six months later, and subsequently signed for Zamora.

Ahead of the 2010 season, Chaurant agreed to a deal with Mineros. Rarely used, he moved to Deportivo Táchira in the following year, before joining Carabobo on 22 December 2011.

In December 2013, Chaurant signed for Deportivo Lara. He renewed his contract for two years on 12 June 2014, and subsequently became team captain.

On 15 February 2019, Chaurant was announced at Universidad Central. He moved to LALA in the following year, and retired at the end of the season, aged 36.

== International career ==
Chaurant was a part of the Venezuela national under-17 team in the 2001 South American U-17 Championship.

== Managerial career ==
In 2022, Chaurant returned to former club Trujillanos as an assistant manager. On 5 September 2023, he replaced sacked Álvaro Valencia at the helm of the squad.

Knocked out in the semifinals in the 2024 season, Chaurant led Trujillanos to the 2025 Liga FUTVE 2 title, but was still sacked on 10 March 2026.

== Honours ==
=== Player ===
Deportivo Táchira

- Venezuelan Primera División: 2010–11

=== Coach ===
Trujillanos

- Liga FUTVE 2: 2025
