= Senel =

Spanish footballer (born 1984)

Personal information
- Full name: José Manuel Lafuente Garrido
- Date of birth: 13 May 1984 (age 42)
- Place of birth: Baiona, Spain
- Height: 1.78 m (5 ft 10 in)
- Position: Forward

Youth career
- Celta

Senior career*
Years	Team	Apps	(Gls)
2003–2004	Ponte Ourense		
2004–2005	Lalín		
2005–2006	Deportivo La Coruña	3	(0)
2006	→ Málaga B (loan)	17	(3)
2006–2007	Atlético Madrid C		
2007–2008	Atlético Madrid B	7	(0)
2008–2009	Zamora	48	(11)
2009–2010	Mirandés	13	(0)
2010–2011	Rápido Bouzas	?	(5)

International career
2001	Spain U16	5	(1)
2001	Spain U17	4	(1)
Medal record
Men's Football
Representing Spain
UEFA European Under-16 Championship
Winner	2001 England
- * Club domestic league appearances and goals

José Manuel Lafuente Garrido (born 13 May 1984 in Baiona, Pontevedra), known as Senel, is a Spanish former footballer who played as a forward.

== Honours ==
Spain U16

- UEFA European Under-16 Championship: 2001
