= Cédric Tsimba =

Swiss footballer (born 1984)

Personal information
- Full name: Cédric Kinzumbi Tsimba
- Date of birth: 5 August 1984 (age 42)
- Place of birth: Kinshasa, Zaire
- Height: 1.77 m (5 ft 10 in)
- Position: Striker

Team information
- Current team: FC Meyrin
- Number: 19

Youth career
- 1999–2001: FC City Chatelaine
- 2001–2003: Servette FC

Senior career*
Years	Team	Apps	(Gls)
2003–2004	Servette FC	2	(0)
2002–2003	→ Servette B	22	(9)
2004	FC Baulmes	8	(0)
2005	FC Meyrin	13	(3)
2005–2007	SK Sturm Graz	17	(2)
2007–2008	→ FC Wil (loan)	24	(0)
2008–2009	FC Wil	8	(0)
2009–2021	FC Meyrin	266	(61)

International career
2005–2006	Switzerland U21	4	(0)
- * Club domestic league appearances and goals as of 24 May 2008

Cédric Kinzumbi Tsimba (born 5 August 1984) is a retired Swiss footballer.

== Career ==
Tsimba began his career with Servette FC in the Swiss Super League. He later joined FC Baulmes before moving to Sturm Graz in Austria. A loan spell and permanent transfer with FC Wil would follow, before moving to FC Meyrin where he would play until retirement.
