= Julio Colombo =

French footballer (born 1984)

Personal information
- Date of birth: 22 February 1984 (age 42)
- Place of birth: Saint-Claude, Guadeloupe
- Height: 1.78 m (5 ft 10 in)
- Position: Defender

Youth career
- 1995–1997: CN de Basse-Terre
- 1997–2002: Montpellier

Senior career*
Years	Team	Apps	(Gls)
2002–2010	Montpellier	89	(0)

International career
2004	France U21	5	(0)
- * Club domestic league appearances and goals

Julio Colombo (born 22 February 1984) is a French former professional footballer who played as a defender for Montpellier HSC. In June 2015, he was arrested by the police during an anti-drug operation.

== Personal life ==
On 15 June 2015, Colombo was arrested by the police during "Hyphen", an anti-drug operation led by France and Italy. The police dismantled an international drug trafficking linked to the Calabrian mafia "'Ndrangheta", questioning 17 suspected criminals, including three members of an influential Italian clan. Colombo was one of 12 people jailed in France.
