= Stéphen Drouin =

French footballer (born 1984)

Personal information
- Full name: Stéphen Drouin
- Date of birth: 27 January 1984 (age 42)
- Place of birth: Paris, France
- Height: 1.86 m (6 ft 1 in)
- Position: Defender

Youth career
- 1992–1994: CA Paris
- 1994–2002: FC Nantes

Senior career*
Years	Team	Apps	(Gls)
2002–2006	FC Nantes	16	(0)
2005–2006	→ Troyes AC (loan)	6	(0)
2006–2009	Troyes AC	34	(1)
2009–2010	Vannes OC	7	(0)
2010–2015	Troyes AC	50	(0)

International career
2003–2004	France U21	10	(1)
- * Club domestic league appearances and goals

Stéphen Drouin (born 27 January 1984) is a French former professional footballer who played as a defender.
