= Anderson Costa (footballer, born 1980) =

Brazilian footballer

Personal information
- Full name: Anderson José de Jesus Costa
- Date of birth: 30 January 1980 (age 46)
- Place of birth: Salvador, Brazil
- Height: 1.82 m (6 ft 0 in)
- Position: Striker

Youth career
- 1999: Paris Saint-Germain
- 2000: RFC Liège

Senior career*
Years	Team	Apps	(Gls)
2000	RFC Liège	3	(0)
2002–2004	Rad	21	(0)
2002	→ Dinamo Pančevo (loan)	14	(3)
2006	XV de Piracicaba		
2006–2007	Camacha	9	(0)
2008–2009	Santana	25	(16)
2009–2010	Camacha	22	(3)
2010	TSV St. Johann	2	(0)
2011	União da Madeira	13	(1)
2011–2013	Ribeira Brava	42	(11)
2013–2014	Oriental	42	(11)
2014	Loures	11	(1)
2017	Oriental	2	(0)
2018–2019	Safranbolu Belediyespor	18	(0)
- * Club domestic league appearances and goals

Anderson José de Jesus Costa (born 30 January 1980) is a Brazilian former professional footballer who played as a striker.

== Career ==
Anderson Costa initially came to FR Yugoslavia for a trial at First League side Rad in May 2002. He later signed with the Belgrade club and played eight games in the first half of the 2002–03 season, before going on loan to Second League side Dinamo Pančevo. In early 2006, Anderson Costa returned to Brazil and joined XV de Piracicaba.

In September 2006, Anderson Costa moved back to Europe and signed with Portuguese club Camacha. He spent the rest of his career in the lower leagues of Portugal, before retiring in 2017.

He also played Austrian side TSV St. Johann and Turkish Safranbolu Belediyespor.
