= Stade Marchand =

Multi-use stadium in Brazzaville, Republic of the Congo

Coordinates: 4°16′45″S 15°15′12″E

Stade Marchand is a multi-use stadium in Brazzaville, Republic of the Congo. It is used for football matches and serves as the home of Diables Noirs of the Congo Premier League. It has a capacity of 5,000 people.
