= Victor Brown (footballer) =

Nigerian footballer

Personal information
- Full name: Victor Okechukwu Brown
- Date of birth: 30 March 1984 (age 42)
- Place of birth: Nigeria
- Position: Forward

Senior career*
Years	Team	Apps	(Gls)
2001	Jasper United		
2002	Enyimba International		
2002–2003	Hapoel Ra'anana		
2003–2004	Bendel Insurance		
- * Club domestic league appearances and goals

Victor Okechukwu Brown (born 30 March 1984) is a Nigerian former professional footballer who played as a forward.

== Career ==
After helping Nigeria come second at the 2001 FIFA U-17 World Championship,
