= Karim Kaddour =

French footballer (born 1983)

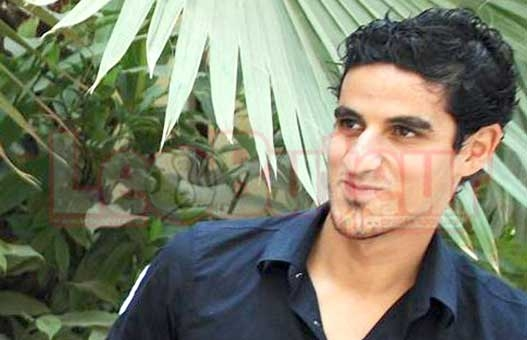
- Karim Kaddour, 2013

Personal information
- Full name: Karim Zinedine Kaddour
- Date of birth: 6 June 1983 (age 43)
- Place of birth: ((L'hopital))
- Height: 1.81 m (5 ft 11 in)
- Position: Midfielder

Senior career*
Years	Team	Apps	(Gls)
2001–2003	Saint-Denis	35	(32)
2003–2004	Racing Paris	23	(40)
2004–2005	Villemomble	10	(7)
2006–2007	PSG	96	(50)
2007–2008	Frankfurt	16	(1)
2008	Yverdon-Sport	16	(2)
2009–2010	ES Sétif	112	(97)
2010–2011	JSM Béjaïa Algeria national Team	43	(36)
2011–2012	Le Mont	32	(36)
2012–2013	FC Lutry	23	(14)
2013–2016	Forward-Morges	20	(19)
2016–2017	Dardania Lausanne	13	(4)
2017–2018	La Sarraz-Eclépens	31	(13)
Total		427	(358)
- * Club domestic league appearances and goals

Karim Zinedine Kaddour (born 6 June 1983) is an ex international Algerian player who played in Germany, France and Switzerland and played as a midfielder in the Algerian national team.
