= Samuel Piètre =

French footballer (born 1984)

Personal information
- Full name: Samuel Piètre
- Date of birth: 10 February 1984 (age 42)
- Place of birth: Villeneuve-Saint-Georges, France
- Height: 1.77 m (5 ft 10 in)
- Positions: Striker; midfielder

Team information
- Current team: AS Poissy

Youth career
- 1997–1999: US Créteil-Lusitanos
- 1999–2001: Paris Saint-Germain

Senior career*
Years	Team	Apps	(Gls)
2001–2007	Paris Saint-Germain II		
2003	→ FC Istres (loan)	1	(0)
2007–2008	Levadiakos	13	(0)
2009–2010	US Créteil-Lusitanos	25	(3)
2010–	Poissy	149	(27)
- * Club domestic league appearances and goals as of 8 February 2018

Samuel Piètre (born 10 February 1984) is a French football player. Currently, he plays in the Championnat National 1 for AS Poissy.

He played for the main squad of Paris Saint-Germain F.C. in Coupe de France and UEFA Cup.

He was part of the 18-man squad for the youth France national team that won the FIFA U-17 World Cup in 2001.
