= Oumar Koné (footballer) =

Malian footballer

Personal information
- Date of birth: 13 April 1991 (age 35)
- Place of birth: Mali
- Position: Defender

Team information
- Current team: Stade Malien

Oumar Koné is a Malian professional footballer, who plays as a defender for Stade Malien.

== International career ==
In January 2014, coach Djibril Dramé, invited him to be a part of the Mali squad for the 2014 African Nations Championship. He helped the team to the quarter-finals, where they lost to Zimbabwe by two goals to one.
