= Dejan Prijić =

Croatian footballer (born 1984)

Personal information
- Full name: Dejan Prijić
- Date of birth: 2 January 1984 (age 42)
- Place of birth: Osijek, SR Croatia, SFR Yugoslavia
- Height: 1.70 m (5 ft 7 in)
- Position: Midfielder

Senior career*
| Years | Team | Apps | (Gls) |
| 2000–2007 | Osijek | 23 | (1) |
| 2004–2005 | → Pula (loan) | 12 | (0) |
| 2005–2006 | → Cibalia (loan) | 21 | (3) |
| 2007 | HAŠK | 11 | (0) |
| 2007 | Belišće | 15 | (4) |
| 2008 | Međimurje | 7 | (0) |
| 2008 | Karlovac | 3 | (0) |
| 2009 | La Louvière | 9 | (0) |
| 2009–2010 | Vukovar | 4 | (1) |
| 2010 | Metalac Osijek | | |
| 2011–2012 | BSK Bijelo Brdo | 14 | (11) |
| 2013 | NK Borac Bobota | | |
| 2014-2016 | Grafičar Vodovod | | |
| 2014 | → Belišće (loan) | | |

International career
| 1999 | Croatia U-15 | 2 | (0) |
| 2001 | Croatia U-16 | 4 | (0) |
| 2000–2001 | Croatia U-17 | 11 | (4) |
| 2002 | Croatia U-19 | 1 | (0) |
| 2004 | Croatia U-20 | 7 | (0) |
| 2000–2005 | Croatia U-21 | 4 | (0) |
- * Club domestic league appearances and goals

Dejan Prijić (born 2 January 1984) is a Croatian footballer who most recently played for Grafičar Vodovod.

== Club career ==
Prijić began his career with NK Osijek, and he played in the Croatian Prva HNL for the club. He also had loan spells at NK Pula 1856 and HNK Cibalia. After leaving Osijek, Prijić went on to play for NK HAŠK and NK Belišće in the Druga HNL before returning to the Prva HNL with NK Međimurje in January 2008.

== International career ==
Prijić played for the Croatia national football team at various youth levels, and participated in the 2001 FIFA World Youth Championship in Trinidad and Tobago.
