= Francisco Alberoni =

Brazilian footballer (born 1984)

Personal information
- Full name: Francisco Terra Alberoni
- Date of birth: 16 May 1984 (age 42)
- Place of birth: Niterói, Brazil
- Height: 1.77 m (5 ft 10 in)
- Position: Midfielder

Senior career*
Years	Team	Apps	(Gls)
2002–2003	Vasco da Gama		
2003	Inter Milan Primavera		
2003–2004	→ Brescia (loan)	10	(0)
2004	Bahia		
2004	Barcelona B		
2005	Independiente		
2005–2006	União de Leiria		
2006	Vasco da Gama		
2006	Las Palmas		
2006–2007	Alavés		
2007	Botafogo	1	(0)
2007–2008	Novo Hamburgo		
2008–2009	Villa Rio		
2009	Duque de Caxias	8	(0)
2010	Slavia Sofia	1	(1)
2011	ASA		
2013	Ríver		

International career
2000–2001	Brazil U17		
2001–2003	Brazil U20		
- * Club domestic league appearances and goals

Francisco Terra Alberoni or simply Alberoni, (born 16 May 1984) is a Brazilian former professional footballer who played as a midfielder.

== Club career ==
Alberoni was born in Niterói. He began playing football in his country at Vasco da Gama. In January 2003, he was signed by Italian side Inter Milan and played six months for its Primavera team (U-20 youth team). For the 2003–04 season he was loaned to Brescia Calcio. After the end of the season he returned to Brazil, signing with Esporte Clube Bahia. From July 2004 to December 2004 Alberoni was a part of the second team of Barcelona. After that he played for a few clubs, including Argentine Independiente and Spanish Las Palmas and Deportivo Alavés. In 2009 Alberoni played 8 matches for Duque de Caxias RJ. In December 2009 Alberoni signed a one-a-half year contract with Bulgarian Slavia Sofia. He remained with the "whites" until August 2010. His stay in Bulgaria was plagued by injury problems.

== International career ==
In 2001 Alberoni was a member of the Brazil U17 team at the South American Championship U17, in Peru. In the same year he also played at the World Cup U-17 in Trinidad and Tobago. Alberoni scored a goal in the quarterfinal against France U17.
