= Aldo Jara =

Paraguayan footballer (born 1984)

Personal information
- Full name: Aldo Andrés Jara
- Date of birth: 25 April 1984 (age 42)
- Place of birth: Asunción, Paraguay
- Position: Forward

Senior career*
Years	Team	Apps	(Gls)
2004	Cerro Porteño	12	(1)
2005	Guaraní	3	(0)
2005–2006	Coquimbo Unido	5	(1)
2007	Universitario	4	(0)
2007	Sol de América	7	(1)
2008	Melgar	11	(2)
2011	San Lorenzo		
2012	Sportivo Iteño		
2013	Martín Ledesma		
2013	Sport Colombia		
2015	San Antonio		

International career
2001	Paraguay U17	10	(8)
- * Club domestic league appearances and goals

Aldo Andrés Jara (born 25 April 1984) is a Paraguayan former professional footballer who played as a forward.

== Career ==
Jara was born in Asunción, Paraguay. He competed at the South American Under-17 Football Championship with the Paraguay U17 national team and became top scorer of the tournament. He also took part in the 2011 FIFA U-17 World Cup.

In November 2003, while at his first club Cerro Porteño he stopped attending training and club officials were unable to locate him. This came after he was left out the Paraguay U20 national team squad for the 2003 FIFA World Youth Championship.

In 2005, he played for Coquimbo Unido in the Chilean Primera División.

In August 2008, Jara joined Peruvian side FBC Melgar.

In July 2009, Jara trialled with Spanish Segunda División club FC Cartagena.
