= Eliassou Issiaka =

Malian footballer

Eliassou
Personal information
- Full name: Eliassou Issiaka
- Date of birth: 25 May 1986 (age 40)
- Place of birth: Mali
- Height: 1.87 m (6 ft 1 1/2 in)
- Position: Right back

Team information
- Current team: Smouha
- Number: 5

Senior career*
Years	Team	Apps	(Gls)
2006–2009	Stade Malien	39	(5)
2009–	Al-Masry	64	(9)
2012–2013	→ Smouha (loan)		
2013–	Al-Oruba		

International career^{‡}
2011–	Mali	1	(0)
- * Club domestic league appearances and goals as of 30 November 2011 (UTC) ‡ National team caps and goals as of 30 November 2011 (UTC)

Eliassou Issiaka (born 12 August 1985) is a Malian football player currently playing for the Egyptian Premier League side Smouha Sporting Club as a right back. He is a member of Mali national football team.
