= Anderson Costa (footballer, born 1984) =

Brazilian footballer

Personal information
- Full name: Anderson Costa
- Date of birth: 13 March 1984 (age 42)
- Place of birth: Rio de Janeiro, Brazil
- Height: 1.85 m (6 ft 1 in)
- Position: Forward

Youth career
- Vasco da Gama

Senior career*
Years	Team	Apps	(Gls)
2002–2005	Vasco da Gama	55	(14)
2005	→ Córdoba (loan)	14	(7)
2006–2007	Dinamo Zagreb	23	(4)
2007	→ Vitória Guimarães (loan)	3	(0)
2007	→ Aris Thessaloniki (loan)	3	(0)
2008	Bahia	0	(0)
2008	Lucena	13	(1)
2009	Duque de Caxias	7	(0)
2009	Bnei Sakhnin	0	(0)
2009–2010	Pro Vercelli	15	(2)
2010	Guarani	4	(0)
2010	Santo André	7	(2)
2011	Al-Wakrah	0	(0)
2011	Criciúma	8	(3)
2012	Vila Nova	4	(3)
2012	ABC	4	(0)
2013	Macaé	12	(4)
2014	CSE	3	(0)

International career
2001	Brazil U-17	4	(1)
- * Club domestic league appearances and goals

Anderson Costa (born 13 March 1984) is a Brazilian footballer.

== Biography ==
Anderson was born in Rio de Janeiro. He made 55 appearances and scored 14 goals in the Campeonato Brasileiro Série A for Vasco da Gama from 2002 to 2005. He renewed his contract in March 2004, signed a 5-year contract. In January 2005 he also spent 6 months with Spanish Segunda División club Córdoba as one of the non-EU players. He was transferred to Dinamo Zagreb in January 2006. However, he requested to leave in July. He was loaned to Portuguese Liga de Honra side in January 2007. The team finished as the runner-up and promoted, however he only played 3 times. He then left for Greek side Aris Thessaloniki and in December 2007 left for Brazilian side Bahia. He was released in April. At the start of 2008–09 season he left for Lucena of Spanish Segunda División B. In January 2009 he was signed by Duque de Caxias in 1-year contract.

In July 2009 he was transferred to Pro Vercelli after a short period with Bnei Sakhnin, which at that time he obtained a Portuguese passport, made him able to by-pass the non-EU immigration ban of Italian lower divisions, along with countryman Adriano da Matta Inácio. His contract was terminated in January 2010. In February, he was signed by Guarani in 1-year deal, and in June left for Santo André, also in 1-year deal. However, after 7 appearances in 2010 Campeonato Brasileiro Série B, he was released in October.

=== International career ===
Anderson Costa played in 2001 FIFA U-17 World Championship.
