= Evelio Hernández (footballer) =

Venezuelan footballer (born 1984)

Evelio
Personal information
- Full name: Evelio de Jesús Hernández Guedez
- Date of birth: 18 June 1984 (age 42)
- Place of birth: San Felipe, Venezuela
- Height: 1.72 m (5 ft 8 in)
- Position: Midfielder

Team information
- Current team: Metropolitanos

Senior career*
| Years | Team | Apps | (Gls) |
| 2003–2005 | Trujillanos | | |
| 2005–2006 | Italmaracaibo | | |
| 2006 | Deportivo Táchira | 18 | (0) |
| 2006–2008 | Zamora | 44 | (12) |
| 2008–2011 | Deportivo Petare | 60 | (17) |
| 2011–2015 | Anzoátegui | 125 | (16) |
| 2015–2017 | Caracas | 75 | (7) |
| 2018–2019 | Zulia | 59 | (5) |
| 2020– | Metropolitanos | 2 | (0) |

International career
| 2007–2013 | Venezuela | 20 | (0) |
- * Club domestic league appearances and goals as of 21 May 2018

Evelio de Jesús Hernández Guedez (born 18 June 1984) is a Venezuelan footballer who currently plays for Primera División club Metropolitanos as a midfielder.

== Venezuelan career ==
Hernández played for Italmaracaibo in 2005.

He played for Deportivo Táchira, and left the team in 2006, signing with Zamora.

Hernández was injured in the 2009-2010 season, missing a good part of the Apertura Tournament that year.

He played for Anzoátegui, filling in for an injured Giácomo Di Giorgi on the front line in 2013.

In 2015, Hernández signed a two-year contract with Caracas.

== International career ==
Hernández played in the 2001 South American Under-17 tournament for Venezuela.

He also played as a midfielder for the Venzuelan team during the 2005 FIFA World Cup qualifying matches.

== Sources ==
- "Caracas contrato a Evelio Hernandez" [Caracas has contracted Evelio Hernandez]. El Nacional (in Spanish). 27 August 2015. Gale A426747777.
- "Final Tournament Results and Rankings". South American Under-17 tournament. 2 May 2001. Gale A73989985.
- "Fútbol: Venezuela inicia el trabajo para amistoso con Panamá" [Football: Venezuela prepares for friendly match against Panama]. UPI Chilean News Service (in Spanish). 21 May 2005. ProQuest 467885006.
- Beaumont, Nestor (6 August 2005). "Evitar el descenso es la consigna" [The goal is to avoid relegation]. El Nacional (in Spanish). ProQuest 336636401.
- Beaumont, Nestor (2 June 2006). "Tachira: el dilema de jugar en un escenario prestado" [Tachira: The problem with playing in a borrowed stadium]. El Nacional (in Spanish). Gale A146526536.
- Beaumont, Nestor (13 July 2006). "Zaguero Central". El Nacional (in Spanish). Gale A148100374.
- Prat Jerez, Daniel (19 January 2013). "Hernandez no volvera a mudarse" [Hernandez will not move positions again]. El Nacional (in Spanish). Gale A315441012.
- Ramírez, Sergio (25 January 2010). "Italia no paso del empate en su visita a Maracaibo" [Italy was held to a draw against Maracaibo]. El Nacional (in Spanish). Gale A217354054.
