= Bakary Coulibaly =

Malian footballer (born 1984)

Personal information
- Date of birth: 11 April 1984 (age 42)
- Place of birth: Bamako, Mali
- Height: 1.75 m (5 ft 9 in)
- Position: Forward

Senior career*
Years	Team	Apps	(Gls)
2002–2004	Djoliba		
2005–2009	Stade Malien		(16)
2009–2010	Al Masry		
2010–2011	El Entag El Harby		
2012–2015	Stade Malien		
2016–2017	Duguwolofila		

International career^{‡}
2010	Mali	1	(0)
- * Club domestic league appearances and goals as of 1 August 2020 ‡ National team caps and goals as of 1 August 2020

Bakary Coulibaly (born 11 April 1984) is a retired Malian professional football striker.
