= 2026–27 Brøndby IF season =

61st season in existence of Brøndby IF

Brøndby
2026–27 season
- Chairman: Jan Bech Andersen
- Head coach: Thomas Nørgaard
- Stadium: Brøndby Stadium
- Danish Superliga: 5th
- Danish Cup: Quarter-finals
- Top goalscorer: League: Olti Hyseni; Mads Frøkjær-Jensen (4 each); All: Olti Hyseni; Mads Frøkjær-Jensen (4 each)
Home colours	Away colours

The 2026–27 Brøndby IF season is Brøndby IF's 46th consecutive season in top-division of the Danish football league, the 37th consecutive in Danish Superliga, and the 61st as a football club. Besides the Superliga, the club also comptes in the Danish Cup. It is the first season with head coach Thomas Nørgaard, after he replaced Steve Cooper in pre-season.

== First-team squad ==
As of 15 September 2026

No.	Player	Position	Nationality	Date of birth (age)	Signed from	Date signed	Fee	Contract end
Goalkeepers
1	Patrick Pentz	GK	(Austria)	2 January 1997 (aged 30)	(Germany) Bayer Leverkusen	10 June 2024	€2.5m	2028
13	Gavin Beavers	GK	(United States)	29 April 2005 (aged 22)	(United States) Real Salt Lake	22 January 2025	Undisclosed	2028
16	Adrian Kappenberger	GK	(Denmark)	25 August 1996 (aged 30)	Hillerød	3 July 2026	Free transfer	2027
50	William Sonne-Schmidt	GK	(Denmark)	12 August 2007 (aged 19)	Academy	8 January 2026	—N/a	2029
Defenders
2	Oliver Villadsen	RB	(Denmark)	16 November 2001 (aged 25)	(Germany) 1. FC Nürnberg	17 July 2025	€1.0m	2029
3	Christopher Olivier	RB	(Austria)	31 January 2006 (aged 21)	(Germany) VfB Stuttgart II	10 August 2026	€1.0m	2030
4	Luis Binks	CB	(England)	2 September 2001 (aged 25)	(England) Coventry City	29 July 2025	€3.0m	2030
24	Marko Divković	LB	(Croatia)	11 June 1999 (aged 28)	(Slovakia) DAC Dunajská Streda	3 March 2022	€1.0m	2028
27	Mats Köhlert	LB	(Germany)	2 May 1998 (aged 29)	(Netherlands) Heerenveen	23 May 2025	Free transfer	2029
30	Jordi Vanlerberghe	CB	(Belgium)	27 June 1996 (aged 31)	(Belgium) KV Mechelen	29 January 2024	€600k	2027
32	Frederik Alves	CB	(Denmark)	8 November 1999 (aged 27)	(England) West Ham United	31 January 2022	€1.0m	2028
34	Lukas Larsen	LB	(Denmark)	11 March 2006 (aged 21)	Academy	11 July 2025	—N/a	2027
37	Raphael Canut	DF	(Denmark)	31 March 2009 (aged 18)	Academy	18 June 2026	—N/a	2028
Midfielders
7	Olti Hyseni	AM / LW	(Denmark)	17 July 2007 (aged 19)	Sønderjyske	31 July 2026	€2.6m	2031
10	Daniel Wass	DM	(Denmark)	31 May 1989 (aged 38)	(Spain) Atlético Madrid	12 August 2022	Undisclosed	2027
15	Casper Winther	CM	(Denmark)	11 February 2003 (aged 24)	Lyngby	2 September 2026	€1.1m	2030
18	Max Ejdum	DM / CM	(Denmark)	15 October 2004 (aged 22)	OB	6 July 2026	€3.5m	2031
29	Mads Frøkjær-Jensen	AM	(Denmark)	29 July 1999 (aged 27)	(England) Preston North End	31 January 2026	€1.2m	2029
36	Viggo Poulsen	AM	(Denmark)	7 April 2008 (aged 19)	Academy	9 April 2026	—N/a	2031
99	Bartosz Slisz	DM	(Poland)	29 March 1999 (aged 28)	(United States) Atlanta United	8 January 2026	€3.5m	2029
Forwards
9	Patrick Mortensen	FW	(Denmark)	13 July 1989 (aged 37)	AGF	1 June 2026	Free transfer	2028
11	Filip Bundgaard	FW	(Denmark)	3 July 2004 (aged 22)	Randers	1 February 2024	€3.0m	2029
17	Emmanuel Dennis	FW	(Nigeria)	15 November 1997 (aged 29)	—N/a	9 January 2026	Free transfer	2028
19	Shō Fukuda	FW	(Japan)	23 March 2001 (aged 26)	(Japan) Shonan Bellmare	26 June 2025	Undisclosed	2029
21	Marcus Younis	FW	(Australia)	3 July 2005 (aged 21)	(Australia) Western Sydney Wanderers	22 August 2025	€300k	2029
38	Jacob Ambæk	FW	(Denmark)	28 March 2008 (aged 19)	Academy	3 January 2026	—N/a	2031
51	Oskar Fenger	FW	(Denmark)	7 March 2008 (aged 19)	Academy	12 May 2026	—N/a	2030

== Transfers and contracts ==
=== Transfers in ===
Date	Pos.	No.	Player	From	Fee	Ref.
First team
1 June 2026	CF	9	(Denmark) Patrick Mortensen	AGF	Free	
3 July 2026	GK	16	(Denmark) Adrian Kappenberger	Hillerød Fodbold	Free	
6 July 2026	CM	18	(Denmark) Max Ejdum	OB	€3,500,000 (Note: Reported as a package fee.)	
31 July 2026	LW	7	(Denmark) Olti Hyseni	Sønderjyske	€2,650,000 (Note: A potential further €550,000 in add-ons. Sønderjyske retained a 14% sell-on clause.)	
10 August 2026	RB	3	(Austria) Christopher Olivier	(Germany) VfB Stuttgart	€1,000,000 (Note: VfB Stuttgart retained a buy-back option.)	
2 September 2026	CM	15	(Denmark) Casper Winther	Lyngby	€1,000,000 (Note: Plus add-ons.)	
Academy
11 June 2026	GK	—	(Denmark) Alexander Drexel	Esbjerg fB	Free	
Total					€8,150,000	

=== Transfers out ===
Date	Pos.	No.	Player	To	Fee	Ref.
First team
12 June 2026	CF	9	(Austria) Michael Gregoritsch	(Germany) FC Augsburg	Undisclosed (Note: Augsburg exercised the option to buy included in his loan.)	
7 July 2026	FW		(Ghana) Emmanuel Yeboah	(Romania) Corvinul Hunedoara	Free (Note: Brøndby retained a 40% sell-on clause.)	
17 July 2026	AM		(Denmark) Nicolai Vallys	(Japan) FC Tokyo	Undisclosed	
27 August 2026	CB		(Denmark) Rasmus Lauritsen	(Greece) Iraklis	Free	
31 August 2026	RB		(Suriname) Sean Klaiber	(Germany) VfL Bochum	Free	
2 September 2026	CM		(Denmark) Mathias Jensen	Vejle	€500,000 (Note: A potential further €250,000 in add-ons. Brøndby retained a buy-back clause.)	
Academy
28 August 2026	CB	—	(Denmark) Philip Søndergaard	AaB	Undisclosed	
Total					€500,000 (Note: Excludes undisclosed fees.)	

=== Loaned out ===
Date	Pos.	No.	Player	Loaned to	On loan until	Ref.
First team
19 June 2026	CF		(Japan) Kōtarō Uchino	(Japan) Mito HollyHock	End of season	
17 August 2026	FW		(Senegal) Ousmane Sow (Note: The loan includes an option to buy.)	(Poland) Jagiellonia Białystok	End of season	
30 August 2026	CM		(Bosnia and Herzegovina) Benjamin Tahirović	(Belgium) Genk	End of season	
Academy
2 September 2026	MF	—	(Denmark) André Escobar	Thisted FC	31 December 2026	

=== Released ===
Date	Pos.	No.	Player	Subsequent club	Joined date	Ref.
First team
30 June 2026	GK		(Denmark) Thomas Mikkelsen	Silkeborg	2 September 2026	
30 June 2026	FW		(Sweden) Carl Björk	(Sweden) GIF Sundsvall	22 July 2026	

=== New contracts ===
Date	Pos.	No.	Player	Contract until	Ref.
First team
30 June 2026	FW		(Denmark) Filip Bundgaard	30 June 2029	

== Competitions ==
=== Danish Superliga ===
==== League table ====
Pos	Team	Pld	W	D	L	GF	GA	GD	Pts	Qualification
3	Viborg	12	6	2	4	19	12	+7	20	Qualification for the Championship round
4	Nordsjælland	12	5	5	2	18	14	+4	20	Qualification for the Championship round
5	Brøndby	12	6	1	5	21	20	+1	19	Qualification for the Championship round
6	Horsens	12	4	4	4	23	20	+3	16	Qualification for the Championship round
7	OB	12	3	5	4	11	16	−5	14	Qualification for the Relegation round

Updated to match(es) played on 26 October 2026. Source: Danish Football Association (in Danish), Soccerway
Rules for classification: 1) Points; 2) Goal difference; 3) Goals scored; 4) Away goals scored; 5) Play-off (played on neutral ground if determining teams for different rounds); 6) Draw.

==== Results by round – Regular season ====
Matchday	1	2	3	4	5	6	7	8	9	10	11	12	13	14	15	16	17	18	19	20	21	22
Ground	H	H	A	A	H	A	H	A	H	A	H	A	H	A	H	A	H	H	A	A	H	A
Result	D	W	W	W	W	L	L	L	L	W	L	W										
Position	4	3	3	3	1	5	5	5	5	5	5	5										

Source: http://www.superliga.dk/
A = Away; H = Home; W = Win; D = Draw; L = Loss

==== Regular season ====
25 July 2026 1	AGF	1–1	Brøndby	Risskov
18:00 CEST	Arnstad 84' (pen.); Kahl (yellow card) 85'	Report	Köhlert (yellow card) 41'; Slisz (yellow card) 26', (goal) 52'; Bundgaard (yellow card) 56'; Divković (yellow card) 67'; Binks (yellow card) 83'	Stadium: Ceres Park Vejlby; Attendance: 8,069; Referee: Morten Krogh

2 August 2026 2	Brøndby	1–0	Viborg	Brøndbyvester
16:00 CEST	Younis (yellow card) 17'; Frøkjær (yellow card) 49'; Hyseni 80'	Report	Jalal (yellow card) 18'; Kirkegaard (yellow card) 82'; Brahimi 90+5'	Stadium: Brøndby Stadium; Attendance: 23,841; Referee: Jakob Sundberg

9 August 2026 3	AC Horsens	0–2	Brøndby	Horsens
18:00 CEST	Kolskogen (yellow card) 34'; Moro (yellow card) 73'	Report	Younis 12', (yellow card) 45'; Kupijbida 60' (o.g.); Ejdum (yellow card) 43'	Stadium: Hybel Arena Horsens; Attendance: 7,057; Referee: Jacob Karlsen

17 August 2026 4	Brøndby	3–2	Sønderjyske	Brøndbyvester
19:00 CEST	Frøkjær 18', 30', (yellow card) 79'; Hyseni 45'; Binks (yellow card) 57'	Report	Qamili (yellow card) 48'; Tambedou 58'; Cherif 64'; Hoppe (yellow card) 77'; Soulas (yellow card) 87'; Emini (yellow card) 90+1'	Stadium: Brøndby Stadium; Attendance: 21,255; Referee: Frederik Svendsen

24 August 2026 5	Brøndby	3–1	Silkeborg	Brøndbyvester
19:00 CEST	Köhlert (yellow card) 6'; Binks (yellow card) 17', (goal) 87'; Vanlerberghe 51'; Fenger 54'; Frøkjær (yellow card) 68'	Report	Møller (yellow card) 32'; McCowatt 44', (yellow card) 90+3'; Priesborg (yellow card) 86'	Stadium: Brøndby Stadium; Attendance: 20,950; Referee: Aydin Uslu

30 August 2026 6	Nordsjælland	3–1	Brøndby	Farum
18:00 CEST	Lind 12'; Janssen 22'; Lähteenmäki (yellow card) 31'; Junior (yellow card) 34'; Ankersen (yellow card) 82'; Boe 83'	Report	Slisz (yellow card) 26'; Mortensen 60'	Stadium: Right to Dream Park; Attendance: 7,713; Referee: Mikkel Redder

6 September 2026 7	Brøndby	0–3	Randers	Brøndbyvester
18:00 CEST	Binks (yellow card) 45+2'	Report	Mahmoud 4'; Hansen (yellow card) 6'; Hopland (yellow card) 57'; Themsen 66'; Sankoh 72'; Pedersen (yellow card) 90+2'	Stadium: Brøndby Stadium; Attendance: 22,881; Referee: Mads-Kristoffer Kristoffersen

14 September 2026 8	Midtjylland	4–1	Brøndby	Herning
19:00 CEST	Kristensen 1'; Iheanacho 23', (yellow card) 67'; Cho 74'; Jensen 89'	Report	Ejdum 69', (yellow card) 73'; Canut 76'; Slisz (yellow card) 89' (yellow-red card) 89'	Stadium: MCH Arena; Attendance: 11,092; Referee: Morten Krogh

20 September 2026 9	Brøndby	0–3	Copenhagen	Brøndbyvester
14:00 CEST	Younis (yellow card) 51'	Report	Robert (yellow card) 59'; Elyounoussi (yellow card) 77'; Cornelius 79'	Stadium: Brøndby Stadium; Attendance: 25,621; Referee: Mikkel Redder

11 October 2026 10	Brøndby	5–2	Lyngby	Brøndbyvester
16:00 CEST	Ambæk 23', 38'; Hyseni 31'; Younis (yellow card) 40'; Ejdum 51'; Fenger 76'; Fukuda (yellow card) 80'	Report	Aronsson (yellow card) 32'; Fischer (yellow card) 55'; Thomasen 66'; Anderson 83'; Garananga (yellow card) 89'	Stadium: Brøndby Stadium; Attendance: 21,729; Referee: Jakob Sundberg

18 October 2026 11	OB	2–1	Brøndby	Odense
16:00 CEST	Ganaus 27'; Canut 29' (o.g.); Myhra (yellow card) 37'; Andersen (yellow card) 53'	Report	Hyseni (yellow card) 42', (goal) 42'	Stadium: Nature Energy Park; Attendance: 10,724; Referee: Michael Tykgaard

23 October 2026 12	Randers	1–3	Brøndby	Randers
19:00 CEST	Themsen 45' (pen.)	Report	Frøkjær 15' (pen.), 64'; Ambæk 60'; Fenger (yellow card) 70'	Stadium: Cepheus Park; Attendance: 6,354; Referee: Jens Maae

1 November 2026 13	Brøndby	v	AGF	Brøndbyvester
16:00 CET				Stadium: Brøndby Stadium

8 November 2026 14	Copenhagen	v	Brøndby	Copenhagen
12:00 CET				Stadium: Parken Stadium

23 November 2026 15	Brøndby	v	Midtjylland	Brøndbyvester
19:00 CET				Stadium: Brøndby Stadium

27 November 2026 16	Sønderjyske	v	Brøndby	Haderslev
19:00 CET				Stadium: AL Sydbank Park

6 December 2026 17	Brøndby	v	OB	Brøndbyvester
16:00 CET				Stadium: Brøndby Stadium

21 February 2027 18	Lyngby	v	Brøndby	Kongens Lyngby
CET				Stadium: Lyngby Stadium

28 February 2027 19	Brøndby	v	Nordsjælland	Brøndbyvester
CET				Stadium: Brøndby Stadium

7 March 2027 20	Silkeborg	v	Brøndby	Silkeborg
CET				Stadium: JYSK Park

14 March 2027 21	Viborg	v	Brøndby	Viborg
CET				Stadium: Energi Viborg Arena

27 March 2027 22	Brøndby	v	AC Horsens	Brøndbyvester
CET				Stadium: Brøndby Stadium

=== Danish Cup ===
17 September 2026 Third round	Vejle	1–2	Brøndby	Vejle
18:30 CEST	Mat. Jensen 38'; Vestergård (yellow card) 55'; Marcussen (penalty missed) 74'	Report	Younis 40', (yellow card) 90+3'; Fukuda 84'; Villadsen (yellow card) 90+5'	Stadium: Vejle Stadium; Attendance: 7,895; Referee: Lasse Læbel Graagaard

27 October 2026 Fourth round	AB	1–2	Brøndby	Gladsaxe
19:30 CET	Clement (yellow card) 32'; Diop (yellow card) 76'; Ilsøe 81'; Koudelka (yellow card) 84'; Rasmussen (yellow card) 85'; Benediktsson (yellow card) 88'	Report	Bundgaard 46'; Ejdum (yellow card) 90'; Fenger 78'; Hyseni (yellow card) 90'	Stadium: Gladsaxe Stadium; Attendance: 10,754; Referee: Jonas Hansen
