= Marcus Younis =

Australian soccer player (born 2005)

- Younis with Brøndby in 2025

Personal information
- Date of birth: 3 July 2005 (age 21)
- Place of birth: Sydney, Australia
- Height: 1.75 m (5 ft 9 in)
- Position: Winger

Team information
- Current team: Brøndby
- Number: 21

Youth career
- North Rocks SC
- 2017–2024: Western Sydney Wanderers

Senior career*
Years	Team	Apps	(Gls)
2023–2024	Western Sydney Wanderers NPL	42	(13)
2023–2025	Western Sydney Wanderers	11	(1)
2024–2025	→ Jong PSV (loan)	26	(5)
2025–	Brøndby	10	(1)
2026	→ Melbourne City (loan)	12	(7)

International career^{‡}
2023	Australia U18	3	(1)
2024	Australia U19	4	(3)
2024	Australia U20	2	(1)
2026–	Australia U23	1	(0)
2026–	Australia	1	(0)
- * Club domestic league appearances and goals as of 20 September 2026 ‡ National team caps and goals as of 25 September 2026

Marcus Younis (born 3 July 2005) is an Australian professional soccer player who plays as a winger for Danish Superliga club Brøndby and the Australia national team.

A product of the Western Sydney Wanderers academy, Younis spent a season on loan at PSV Eindhoven before joining Brøndby in 2025. After a difficult first few months in Denmark, he revived his career with a prolific loan spell at Melbourne City in 2026. He then returned to establish himself in Brøndby's starting line-up under Thomas Nørgaard, and made his senior international debut against Brazil later that year.

== Club career ==
=== Western Sydney Wanderers ===
Born and raised in the suburbs of Western Sydney, Younis joined Western Sydney Wanderers at the age of 12, though recurring injuries held him back for three years. Once he had found consistency in the youth teams, he made his A-League Men debut on 15 January 2023, replacing Brandon Borrello in the 82nd minute of a 1–1 draw with Melbourne City. On 7 July that year he signed his first professional contract, a two-year scholarship deal with the first team.

==== Loan to PSV ====
After impressing over the 2022–23 and 2023–24 seasons, Younis extended his contract with the Wanderers by two years in September 2024. On the same day he joined PSV Eindhoven of the Eredivisie on loan with an option to buy. He played 26 matches for Jong PSV in the 2024–25 Eerste Divisie, scoring five goals and providing four assists.

=== Brøndby ===
On 22 August 2025, Younis signed for Brøndby on a contract until the summer of 2029. His first months in Denmark brought little playing time. Under head coach Steve Cooper he made only four appearances, all from the bench, two in the Superliga and two in the Danish Cup, before he was loaned out in January 2026.

==== Loan to Melbourne City ====
On 23 January 2026, Younis returned to Australia, joining Melbourne City on loan until the end of the 2025–26 A-League season. He scored on his debut, a consolation goal in a 6–2 defeat to Macarthur.

On 11 February 2026, Younis made his AFC Champions League Elite debut against Ulsan HD FC. He set up Max Caputo and then scored a stoppage-time winner in a 2–1 victory. On 4 April, he scored and provided two assists in a 3–0 win over his former club Western Sydney Wanderers, before being sent off for a second yellow card in the 67th minute.

His final appearance of the loan came in City's elimination final against Auckland FC at Go Media Stadium. He played the full 120 minutes and converted City's third penalty past Michael Woud in the shoot-out, but City lost it 7–6. He finished his spell in Melbourne with eight goals and five assists in 15 appearances.

==== Return to Brøndby ====
Younis returned to Brøndby for pre-season under new head coach Thomas Nørgaard, and made an immediate impression. He started Nørgaard's first match in charge, a friendly against Hvidovre, and scored the first two goals in an 8–1 win. Afterwards he described the atmosphere in the squad the previous season as hostile, and said the group was now much happier. Nørgaard praised his confidence and directness in pre-season, though he stressed that the battle for a starting place was still open. Younis went on to work his way into the starting line-up ahead of the club's expensive summer signing Ousmane Sow. Nørgaard later said the loan to Melbourne had been the right solution for a young player who had fallen into a difficult spell.

On 9 August 2026, Younis scored his first goal for Brøndby, heading in a cross from Mats Köhlert in a 2–0 win away to AC Horsens that took the club to the top of the Superliga. The header was voted the best goal of the round. Later that month he set up Oskar Fenger for the go-ahead goal in a 3–1 home win over Silkeborg. In October he laid on Olti Hyseni's goal in a 5–2 win over Lyngby, and he provided another assist in a 3–1 win over Randers on 23 October.

== International career ==
In May 2023, Younis received his first international call-up for the Australia U18 side. He made his debut as a substitute on 9 June, in a 4–2 loss to Portugal, and scored his first goal for Australia in a 3–2 loss to England.

On 25 September 2023, Younis was called up to the Australia U20 side for friendlies against France, Netherlands and Denmark in Marbella, Spain. However, he pulled out of the squad due to injury two weeks later.

Younis was called up to the Australia U23 team for the 2026 AFC U-23 Asian Cup in January 2026, appearing as a substitute against South Korea in the quarter-finals.

Younis was called up to the Australia national team for the friendly matches against Brazil in September 2026. He made his debut on 25 September, as an 84th-minute substitute in a 1–1 draw against Brazil.

== Style of play ==
Younis has been described as a versatile winger known for his speed and direct approach.

== Personal life ==
Younis is of Lebanese descent. His father, Ray, is a former National Soccer League player who works as the Wanderers's conditioning coach. His uncle, Robert, also played professionally for Adelaide United. He has a younger sister, Talia, who is also a professional footballer.

== See also ==
- List of association football families
