= 2025–26 Brøndby IF season =

60th season in existence of Brøndby IF

Brøndby IF
2025–26 season
- Owner: Global Football Holdings
- Chairman: Jan Bech Andersen
- Head coach: Frederik Birk (until 9 September); Steve Cooper (from 9 September)
- Stadium: Brøndby Stadium
- Danish Superliga: 3rd
- Danish Cup: Fourth round
- UEFA Conference League: Play-off round
- Top goalscorer: League: Nicolai Vallys (5); All: Nicolai Vallys (8)
- Highest home attendance: 25,493 (13 September 2025 vs. Copenhagen)
- Average home league attendance: 20,714
colours
- All statistics correct as of 16 December 2025.

The 2025–26 Brøndby IF season is Brøndbyernes Idrætsforening's 45th consecutive season in the top division of Danish football, their 36th consecutive season in the Danish Superliga, and their 60th overall as a football club. In addition to the domestic league, Brøndby are participating in this season's edition of the Danish Cup, as well as the UEFA Conference League. The season covers the period from 1 July 2025 to 30 June 2026.

== Season summary ==
=== Pre-season ===
Brøndby entered the 2025–26 season on the back of a third-place finish in the 2024–25 Danish Superliga, a result that qualified the club for the second qualifying round of the UEFA Conference League. It was the first full pre-season under 36-year-old head coach Frederik Birk, whose interim stewardship was made permanent on 8 January 2025 after the dismissal of Jesper Sørensen.

In March 2025, veteran midfielder Daniel Wass had already agreed a 12-month contract extension to June 2026, ensuring his experience remained at the core of the squad. Sporting director Benjamin Schmedes oversaw a streamlined transfer window that centred on pace and width. Germany's Mats Köhlert arrived on a free transfer from SC Heerenveen on 23 May, Japanese prospects Kōtarō Uchino and Shō Fukuda signed long-term deals in late June. Departures funded the rebuild: captain Jacob Rasmussen moved to Red Bull Salzburg on 9 June, top scorer Yuito Suzuki joined SC Freiburg on 1 July, right-back Sebastian Sebulonsen transferred to 1. FC Köln on 18 July and home-grown forward Mathias Kvistgaarden completed an £8 million transfer to Norwich City on 8 July.

Players not involved in summer internationals reported back to Brøndby Stadion on 19 June for medical testing, before the full squad embarked on a week-long altitude camp in Upper Austria from 6 to 13 July. The itinerary, confirmed by the club on 16 June, scheduled four friendlies: a 1–1 draw at Hvidovre IF on 28 June, a 2–1 home win over Vejle Boldklub on 5 July, and victories over LASK (1–0, 9 July) and Hertha BSC (1–0, 13 July) at neutral venues.

Date	Opponents	H / A	Result F–A	Scorers	Attendance
28 June 2025	Hvidovre IF	A	1–1	Wass '43	2,800
5 July 2025	Vejle	H	2–1	Uchino (2) 7', 39'	?
9 July 2025	LASK	N	1–0	Bundgaard 48'	?
13 July 2025	Hertha BSC	N	1–0	Vallys 53'	?

== First‑team squad ==
As of 20 January 2026

No.	Player	Position	Nationality	Date of birth (age)	Signed from	Date signed	Fee	Contract end
Goalkeepers
1	Patrick Pentz	GK	(Austria)	2 January 1997 (age 29)	(Germany) Leverkusen	1 July 2024	€2.6 m	2028
13	Gavin Beavers	GK	(United States)	29 April 2005 (age 21)	(United States) Real Salt Lake	22 January 2025	Undisclosed	2028
16	Thomas Mikkelsen	GK	(Denmark)	27 August 1983 (age 43)	Lyngby	1 July 2021	Free	2026
Defenders
2	Oliver Villadsen	RB	(Denmark)	16 November 2001 (age 25)	(Germany) Nürnberg	3 July 2025	€1.5 m	2029
4	Luis Binks	CB	(England)	2 September 2001 (age 25)	(England) Coventry City	29 July 2025	Undisclosed	2030
5	Rasmus Lauritsen	CB	(Denmark)	27 February 1996 (age 30)	(Croatia) Dinamo Zagreb	12 July 2023	€1.6 m	2027
14	Ben Godfrey	CB	(England)	15 January 1998 (age 28)	(Italy) Atalanta	20 January 2026	Loan	2026
24	Marko Divković	LB	(Croatia)	11 June 1999 (age 27)	(Slovakia) DAC Dunajská Streda	31 August 2021	€1.2 m	2026
27	Mats Köhlert	LB / LW	(Germany)	2 May 1998 (age 28)	(Netherlands) SC Heerenveen	11 July 2024	€2.7 m	2029
30	Jordi Vanlerberghe	CB / DM	(Belgium)	27 June 1996 (age 30)	(Belgium) Mechelen	1 February 2025	€1.0 m	2027
31	Sean Klaiber	RB	(Suriname) (Netherlands)	31 July 1994 (age 32)	(Netherlands) FC Utrecht	8 July 2024	€1.5 m	2027
32	Frederik Alves	CB	(Denmark)	6 November 1999 (age 27)	(England) West Ham United	15 January 2024	Free	2028
Midfielders
6	Stijn Spierings	DM	(Netherlands)	12 March 1996 (age 30)	(France) Lens	28 August 2024	Free	2027
8	Benjamin Tahirović	CM	(Bosnia and Herzegovina) (Sweden)	3 March 2003 (age 23)	(Netherlands) Ajax	3 February 2025	Undisclosed	2028
10	Daniel Wass (C)	CM / RB	(Denmark)	31 May 1989 (age 37)	(Spain) Atlético Madrid	31 January 2022	Free	2026
42	Mathias Jensen	CM	(Denmark)	15 May 2005 (age 21)	Academy	1 July 2025	—	2030
99	Bartosz Slisz	CM	(Poland)	29 March 1999 (age 27)	(United States) Atlanta United	8 January 2026	€3.0 m	2029
Forwards
7	Nicolai Vallys (VC)	LW / AM	(Denmark)	4 September 1996 (age 30)	Silkeborg IF	1 August 2022	€1.3 m	2027
11	Filip Bundgaard	ST / LW	(Denmark)	3 July 2004 (age 22)	Randers FC	15 July 2023	€2.0 m	2028
18	Kōtarō Uchino	ST	(Japan)	1 April 2003 (age 23)	(Japan) Tsukuba University	12 July 2025	Undisclosed	2029
19	Shō Fukuda	ST	(Japan)	25 November 2001 (age 24)	(Japan) Shonan Bellmare	1 July 2025	€0.75 m	2029
22	Ousmane Sow	ST	(Senegal)	5 July 2000 (age 26)	(Poland) Górnik Zabrze	8 January 2026	€3.0 m	2030
38	Jacob Ambæk	ST	(Denmark)	20 January 2007 (age 19)	Academy	1 July 2025	—	2030

Includes first‑team players and Masterclass graduates who train routinely with the senior squad and have made at least one league appearance.

Key

# – Current Masterclass player.
† – Signed in the January window.
‡ – Initially signed to Academy team.

== Transfers ==
=== In ===
Date	Pos.	Nat.	Name	Club	Fee	Ref.
23 June 2025	FW	(Japan)	Kōtarō Uchino	(Japan) Tsukuba University	Free	
23 June 2025	DF	(Germany)	Mats Köhlert	(Netherlands) SC Heerenveen	Free	
26 June 2025	FW	(Japan)	Shō Fukuda	(Japan) Shonan Bellmare	Undisclosed	
17 July 2025	DF	(Denmark)	Oliver Villadsen	(Germany) 1. FC Nürnberg	Undisclosed	
29 July 2025	DF	(England)	Luis Binks	(England) Coventry City	€3.00m	
20 August 2025	FW	(Austria)	Michael Gregoritsch	(Germany) Freiburg	€1.50m	
8 January 2026	MF	(Poland)	Bartosz Slisz	(United States) Atlanta United	€3.00m	
8 January 2026	FW	(Senegal)	Ousmane Sow	(Poland) Górnik Zabrze	€3.00m	
22 January 2026	FW	(Nigeria)	Emmanuel Dennis	Free agent	Free	
2 February 2026	MF	(Denmark)	Mads Frøkjær	(England) Preston North End	€1.25m	

=== Out ===
Date	Pos.	Nat.	Name	Club	Fee	Ref.
20 May 2025	FW	(Japan)	Yuito Suzuki	(Germany) SC Freiburg	Undisclosed	
2 June 2025	MF	(Poland)	Mateusz Kowalczyk	(Poland) GKS Katowice	Undisclosed	
9 June 2025	DF	(Denmark)	Jacob Rasmussen	(Austria) Red Bull Salzburg	Undisclosed	
23 June 2025	DF	(Denmark)	Ludvig Vraa-Jensen	(Austria) Grazer AK	Free transfer	
8 July 2025	FW	(Denmark)	Mathias Kvistgaarden	(England) Norwich City	€8.00m	
18 July 2025	DF	(Norway)	Sebastian Sebulonsen	(Germany) 1. FC Köln	€2.50m	
19 July 2025	MF	(Denmark)	Adam Claridge	(Netherlands) Emmen	Undisclosed	
2 September 2025	MF	(Denmark)	Clement Bischoff	(Austria) Red Bull Salzburg	Undisclosed	
16 December 2025	DF	(United States)	Justin Che	(United States) New York Red Bulls	Undisclosed	
19 January 2026	MF	(Denmark)	Noah Nartey	(France) Olympique Lyon	€7.50m	
25 January 2026	MF	(Netherlands)	Stijn Spierings	(United States) Real Salt Lake	Undisclosed	

=== Loans in ===
Date	Pos.	Nat.	Name	Club	Duration	Ref.
20 January 2026	DF	(England)	Ben Godfrey	(Italy) Atalanta	30 June 2026	
1 February 2026	FW	(Sweden)	Mayckel Lahdo	(Netherlands) AZ Alkmaar	30 June 2026	

=== Loans out ===
Date	Pos.	Nat.	Name	Club	Duration	Ref.
8 July 2025	FW	(Sweden)	Carl Björk	(Denmark) B.93	30 June 2026	
11 July 2025	DF	(Denmark)	Lukas Larsen	(Netherlands) Emmen	30 June 2026	
17 July 2025	FW	(Ghana)	Emmanuel Yeboah	(Sweden) Halmstads BK	30 June 2026	
2 January 2026	DF	(Denmark)	Philip Søndergaard	(Netherlands) Emmen	30 June 2026	
7 January 2026	FW	(Austria)	Michael Gregoritsch	(Germany) Augsburg	30 June 2026	
22 January 2026	FW	(Australia)	Marcus Younis	(Australia) Melbourne City	30 June 2026	
5 March 2026	FW	(Japan)	Kōtarō Uchino	(Japan) Vissel Kobe	30 June 2026	

== Competitions ==
=== Overall record ===
Competition	Starting round	Record							
Competition	Starting round	Pld	W	D	L	GF	GA	GD	Win %
Superliga	Matchday 1	8	5	0	3	11	9	+2	62.50
Danish Cup	Third round	0	0	0	0	0	0	+0	—
UEFA Conference League	Second qualifying round	6	2	2	2	8	7	+1	33.33
Total		14	7	2	5	19	16	+3	50.00

Last updated: 13 September 2025
Source: Soccerway

=== Superliga ===
==== League table ====
Pos	Team	Pld	W	D	L	GF	GA	GD	Pts	Qualification
2	Midtjylland	22	13	7	2	58	23	+35	46	Qualification for the Championship round
3	Sønderjyske	22	10	6	6	34	28	+6	36	Qualification for the Championship round
4	Brøndby	22	10	4	8	31	22	+9	34	Qualification for the Championship round
5	Viborg	22	10	3	9	37	35	+2	33	Qualification for the Championship round
6	Nordsjælland	22	10	1	11	37	39	−2	31	Qualification for the Championship round

Source: Danish Football Association (in Danish), Soccerway
Rules for classification: 1) Points; 2) Goal difference; 3) Goals scored; 4) Away goals scored; 5) Play-off (played on neutral ground if determining teams for different rounds); 6) Draw.

==== Results summary ====
Overall								Home						Away					
Pld	W	D	L	GF	GA	GD	Pts	W	D	L	GF	GA	GD	W	D	L	GF	GA	GD
10	6	0	4	16	11	+5	18	4	0	2	13	8	+5	2	0	2	3	3	0

Last updated: 1 October 2025.
Source: FBref

==== Results by round – regular season ====
Matchday	1	2	3	4	5	6	7	8	9	10	11	12	13	14	15	16	17	18	19	20	21	22
Ground	H	A	H	H	A	A	H	H	A	H	A	H	A	A	H	A	H	A	H	A	H	A
Result	W	W	L	W	W	L	L	W	L	W	W	D	W	W	W	L						
Position	1	1	3	2	2	3	4	4	4	4	4	3	3	3	2	3						

Win	Draw	Loss

Date	Opponents	Venue	Result F–A	Scorers	Attendance	League position
20 July 2025	Silkeborg	H	3–0	Bundgaard (2) 23', 61', Vallys '86	21,523	1st
27 July 2025	Nordsjælland	A	1–0	Bischoff 16'	6,711	1st
3 August 2025	Viborg	H	0–2		21,909	3rd
10 August 2024	Vejle	H	2–1	Vallys '8, Binks '22	19,863	2nd
17 August 2025	Randers	A	2–0	Bundgaard '13, Spierings '34	8,057	2nd
24 August 2025	Sønderjyske	A	0–2		8,735	3rd
31 August 2025	Midtjylland	H	1–3	Fukuda '88	18,552	4th
13 September 2025	Copenhagen	H	2–1	Gregoritsch '45+1 (pen.), Spierings '73	25,493	4th
21 September 2025	AGF	A	0–1		10,818	4th
28 September 2025	OB	H	5–1	Fukuda '8, Vallys (2) '39, 52', Wass 45+3' (pen.), Nartey 64'	18,554	4th

=== Danish Cup ===
Date	Round	Opponents	H / A	Result F–A	Scorers	Attendance
24 September 2025	Third round	B.93	A	4–1	Binks 9', Nartey (2) 13', 63', Ambæk 69'	5,528
28–30 October 2025	Fourth round	Nordsjælland	A			

=== UEFA Conference League ===
Brøndby qualified for the UEFA Conference League as Superliga bronze medallists, entering in the second qualifying round. They began with a 1–1 draw away to HB Tórshavn on 24 July before edging the return leg 1–0 at Brøndby Stadium to progress 2–1 on aggregate.

The third qualifying round brought a dramatic tie against Víkingur Reykjavík. A 3–0 defeat in the first leg was described in the Danish press as a collapse, but Brøndby overturned the deficit with a 4–0 victory in the return. Nicolai Vallys and Filip Bundgaard each scored twice, and the side played more than 70 minutes with ten men after Clement Bischoff's early dismissal. The comeback was widely labelled a "miracle".

In the play-off round Brøndby were paired with Strasbourg. The first leg in France finished goalless, but the return in Brøndby ended 3–2 to the visitors, knocking Brøndby out of European contention. Reports highlighted the role of goalkeeper Patrick Pentz, praised for his performance in Strasbourg but criticised for mistakes leading to the first two goals in the return. Daniel Wass pulled one back before half-time, only for Emanuel Emegha to restore Strasbourg's cushion on the counter. New signing Michael Gregoritsch marked his debut with a late goal from an indirect free kick, but Brøndby were unable to find an equaliser.

Date	Round	Opponents	H / A	Result F–A	Scorers	Attendance
24 July 2025	Second qualifying round First leg	HB	A	1–1	Bundgaard 62'	3,589
31 July 2025	Second qualifying round Second leg	HB	H	1–0	Fukuda 31'	20,815
7 August 2025	Third qualifying round First leg	Víkingur Reykjavík	A	0–3		1,200
14 August 2025	Third qualifying round Second leg	Víkingur Reykjavík	H	4–0	Vallys (2) 45+2', 52', Bundgaard (2) 57', 71'	17,329
21 August 2025	Play-off round First leg	Strasbourg	A	0–0		22,080
28 August 2025	Play-off round Second leg	Strasbourg	H	2–3	Wass 45', Gregoritsch 86'	23,930
