= Casper Winther =

Danish footballer (born 2003)

Personal information
- Full name: Casper Kaarsbo Winther
- Date of birth: 11 February 2003 (age 23)
- Place of birth: Lyngby, Denmark
- Height: 1.75 m (5 ft 9 in)
- Position: Central midfielder

Team information
- Current team: Brøndby
- Number: 15

Youth career
- –2014: Brede IF
- 2014–2020: Lyngby

Senior career*
Years	Team	Apps	(Gls)
2020–2026	Lyngby	129	(11)
2026–	Brøndby	1	(0)

International career^{‡}
2019	Denmark U16	2	(0)
2020	Denmark U18	2	(0)
2021–2022	Denmark U19	6	(0)
2022–2023	Denmark U20	4	(1)
2022	Denmark U21	2	(1)
- * Club domestic league appearances and goals as of 11:39, 18 September 2026 (UTC) ‡ National team caps and goals as of 19 November 2023

Casper Kaarsbo Winther (born 11 February 2003) is a Danish professional footballer who plays as a midfielder for Danish Superliga club Brøndby.

== Club career ==
=== Lyngby ===
Born in Lyngby, Denmark, Winther came through the youth academy of local club Lyngby Boldklub, having joined from Brede IF at the age of 11. He made his professional debut on 7 October 2020 in a Danish Cup match against Brønshøj, coming on as a substitute for Victor Torp in a 5–4 victory after extra time.

On 1 March 2021, Winther first appeared in the Danish Superliga, again replacing Torp during a 4–1 win over SønderjyskE. Despite breaking into the first team, he could not help Lyngby avoid relegation at the end of the 2020–21 season, as the club finished second-to-last in the league standings. He scored his first goal for the club on 4 August 2021 in a 9–0 victory over Østerbro IF in the Danish Cup.

On 28 February 2022, Winther signed a contract extension with Lyngby, keeping him at the club until June 2025. He helped Lyngby secure promotion back to the Danish top-flight after the 2021–22 season. On 27 February 2024, he signed a further extension, committing to the club until June 2027.

Following promotion, Lyngby spent three seasons in the Danish Superliga. The third of these, 2024–25, ended in relegation to the Danish 1st Division, confirmed on 18 May 2025 after a 5–1 defeat to Sønderjyske.

In the 2025–26 1st Division season, Winther was a central figure in Lyngby's promotion-winning side, scoring eight goals and providing three assists in 24 league appearances. Lyngby secured promotion back to the Danish Superliga, and Winther was voted Player of the Year in the 1st Division by his fellow professionals, receiving 34% of the vote.

=== Brøndby ===
On 2 September 2026, the closing day of the Danish transfer window, Winther joined Danish Superliga club Brøndby on a permanent transfer, signing a contract until 30 June 2030 and taking the number 15 shirt. The move was for a reported guaranteed fee of €1.1 million, rising to €1.3 million with bonuses.

He made his debut for the club on 14 September, replacing Shō Fukuda in the 81st minute of a 4–1 Superliga loss to Midtjylland. Three days later he made his first start for Brøndby in a 2–1 cup victory against Vejle.

== International career ==
Winther debuted for Denmark at youth international level in May 2019, appearing in two friendly matches for the under-16 team against Slovakia, held in Rønne and Nexø on the island of Bornholm. In September 2020, he represented the under-18 national team in a pair of friendlies against Germany in Leipzig, again featuring in both matches within a short span. Progressing through the youth ranks, Winther earned his first cap for the Denmark under-19 side on 4 September 2021, starting in a friendly match against Norway in Moss.

In November 2022, Winther received his first call-up to the Denmark under-21 team under head coach Jesper Sørensen. He debuted for the side on 17 November 2022, starting in a friendly against Sweden. Winther scored his first goal at the under-21 level in the match, which ended in a 2–2 draw.

== Personal life ==
Winther grew up in Lyngby-Taarbæk Municipality and has spent his entire life in the Lyngby area. He attended Virum Gymnasium while progressing through the youth system at Lyngby Boldklub, having joined the club from its local partner, Brede IF, at 11. Known by the nickname "Dani"—a reference to former Brazilian international Dani Alves—he earned the moniker after frequently wearing the number 13 shirt during his youth career.

== Career statistics ==
As of the match played on 17 September 2026

Appearances and goals by club, season and competition
Club	Season	League			Danish Cup		Other		Total	
Club	Season	Division	Apps	Goals	Apps	Goals	Apps	Goals	Apps	Goals
Lyngby	2020–21	Danish Superliga	6	0	0	0	—		6	0
Lyngby	2021–22	Danish 1st Division	13	0	1	1	—		14	1
Lyngby	2022–23	Danish Superliga	27	0	1	0	—		28	0
Lyngby	2023–24	Danish Superliga	27	1	5	0	—		32	1
Lyngby	2024–25	Danish Superliga	26	1	1	0	—		27	1
Lyngby	2025–26	Danish 1st Division	24	8	3	0	—		27	8
Lyngby	2026–27	Danish Superliga	6	1	0	0	—		6	1
Lyngby	Total		129	11	11	1	0	0	140	12
Brøndby	2026–27	Danish Superliga	1	0	1	0	—		2	0
Career total			130	11	12	1	0	0	142	12

== Honours ==
Lyngby

- Danish 1st Division: 2025–26

Individual

- Danish 1st Division Player of the Season: 2025–26
