= Olti Hyseni =

Danish footballer (born 2007)

- Hyseni in 2026

Personal information
- Date of birth: 17 July 2007 (age 19)
- Place of birth: Sønderborg, Denmark
- Height: 1.75 m (5 ft 9 in)
- Position: Left winger

Team information
- Current team: Brøndby
- Number: 7

Youth career
- –2019: Sønderborg Boldklub
- 2019–2023: Sønderjyske

Senior career*
Years	Team	Apps	(Gls)
2023–2026	Sønderjyske	63	(9)
2026–	Brøndby	11	(4)

International career^{‡}
2023	Denmark U16	4	(5)
2023–2024	Denmark U17	11	(2)
2024–2025	Denmark U18	6	(4)
2025–	Denmark U19	16	(8)
2026–	Denmark U20	2	(1)
- * Club domestic league appearances and goals as of 22:14, 23 October 2026 (UTC) ‡ National team caps and goals as of 4 October 2026

Olti Hyseni (born 17 July 2007) is a Danish professional footballer who plays as a winger for Danish Superliga club Brøndby.

Hyseni came through the academy of Sønderjyske, where he became the club's youngest goalscorer at 16 and its youngest Superliga scorer at 17. He broke into the first team in the spring of 2025 and joined Brøndby in July 2026 in the largest sale in Sønderjyske's history, scoring the winning goal on his debut. He has represented Denmark at under-17 and under-19 level and started the semi-final of the 2024 UEFA European Under-17 Championship.

== Early life ==
Hyseni was born in Sønderborg to parents from Kosovo and grew up in the town, where he played youth football for Sønderborg Boldklub. He has said that his mother came to Denmark in 1999 and that his father was granted a residence permit in 2007, arriving the day before he was born.

== Club career ==
=== Sønderjyske ===
Hyseni joined the Sønderjyske academy in Haderslev as an under-13 player. After two years of long daily journeys to training, he moved away from home at 15 to live closer to the club. He signed his first contract with Sønderjyske on his 15th birthday in July 2022.

Head coach Thomas Nørgaard gave Hyseni his first-team debut on 27 October 2023 in a Danish 1st Division match away to B.93. He came on in the 80th minute and five minutes later set up the last goal of a 4–0 win. Aged 16 years, three months and ten days, he became the second-youngest debutant in the club's history.

A month later, on 24 November, Hyseni came off the bench to score the last goal of a 4–1 home win over Næstved. Aged 16 years, four months and seven days, he became the youngest goalscorer in Sønderjyske's history. He broke the record of Simon Poulsen, who had scored in a cup match in 2001 at 16 years and 11 months. On 28 December 2023, he signed his first full-time contract, which ran until June 2026, and was promoted to the first-team squad.

Hyseni made his breakthrough in the spring of the 2024–25 season, Sønderjyske's first back in the Superliga. On 27 April 2025, he scored against Viborg FF to become the youngest Superliga goalscorer in the club's history. He was 17, and he beat the record of John Jairo Mosquera, who had scored at 18. Hyseni started every match of the relegation round as Sønderjyske comfortably avoided the drop, and he finished the season with three goals. Jacob Quvang of Tipsbladet called him one of the brightest spots of Sønderjyske's spring and one of the biggest talents in the league.

In August 2025, after a strong start to the 2025–26 season, Hyseni extended his contract until June 2029. He held a starting place for the last seven rounds of the season.

On 31 July 2026, Sønderjyske sold Hyseni to Brøndby in the largest sale in the club's history. He left after 68 matches and ten goals for the club. Sporting director Casper Daather said Hyseni embodied everything Sønderjyske wanted to achieve as a football project for the whole of Southern Jutland.

=== Brøndby ===
Hyseni signed a five-year contract with Brøndby running until June 2031. Brøndby signed him to replace Nicolai Vallys, who had left the club earlier that summer. The move reunited him with Nørgaard, who had left Sønderjyske to take charge of Brøndby that summer. Tipsbladet reported an initial fee of €2.65 million, rising to as much as €3.2 million with bonuses. Sønderjyske also kept a 14% sell-on clause.

Hyseni made his debut two days later, against Viborg at Brøndby Stadium. He came on as a substitute and headed the only goal of the match in the 80th minute. On 11 October, Hyseni scored in a 5–2 home win over Lyngby. A week later he scored again in a 2–1 defeat away to OB.

== International career ==
In March 2024, while he was a Denmark under-17 international, Hyseni said that he felt Danish and that Denmark had the best national team. His father, Flamur Hyseni, said the remark had been misread and that his son was proud of his Kosovan roots. He added that Olti had received no approach from Kosovo but had not ruled out playing for the country in the future.

In May 2024, Hyseni was named in Denmark's squad for the 2024 European Under-17 Championship in Cyprus. He started the opening 2–0 win over Wales. Denmark reached their first semi-final of the tournament since 2011, where Hyseni started in a 1–0 defeat to Italy, the eventual champions, on 2 June 2024.

In May 2025, he received his first call-up to the under-19 side for the 2025 UEFA European Under-19 Championship in Romania. In June 2026, he was selected again for the 2026 UEFA European Under-19 Championship, where Denmark played Germany, Spain and Wales in the group stage.

== Style of play ==
Hyseni is a technical winger known for his dribbling and chance creation. He has been described as a creative player who operates between the lines rather than a runner in behind. He is comfortable receiving the ball in tight spaces and can turn either way past his marker. From there, he can take on his opponent, carry the ball forward or play a chance-creating pass through the opposition's lines. Although not slow, he lacks top-end sprinting speed.

== Career statistics ==
As of the match played on 23 October 2026

Appearances and goals by club, season and competition
Club	Season	League			Danish Cup		Other		Total	
Club	Season	Division	Apps	Goals	Apps	Goals	Apps	Goals	Apps	Goals
Sønderjyske	2023–24	Danish 1st Division	11	2	0	0	—		11	2
Sønderjyske	2024–25	Danish Superliga	20	2	3	1	—		23	3
Sønderjyske	2025–26	Danish Superliga	31	5	2	0	—		33	5
Sønderjyske	2026–27	Danish Superliga	1	0	—		—		1	0
Sønderjyske	Total		63	9	5	1	0	0	68	10
Brøndby	2026–27	Danish Superliga	11	4	1	0	—		12	4
Career total			74	13	6	1	0	0	80	14

== Honours ==
Sønderjyske

- Danish 1st Division: 2023–24
