= Jacob Ambæk =

Danish footballer (born 2008)

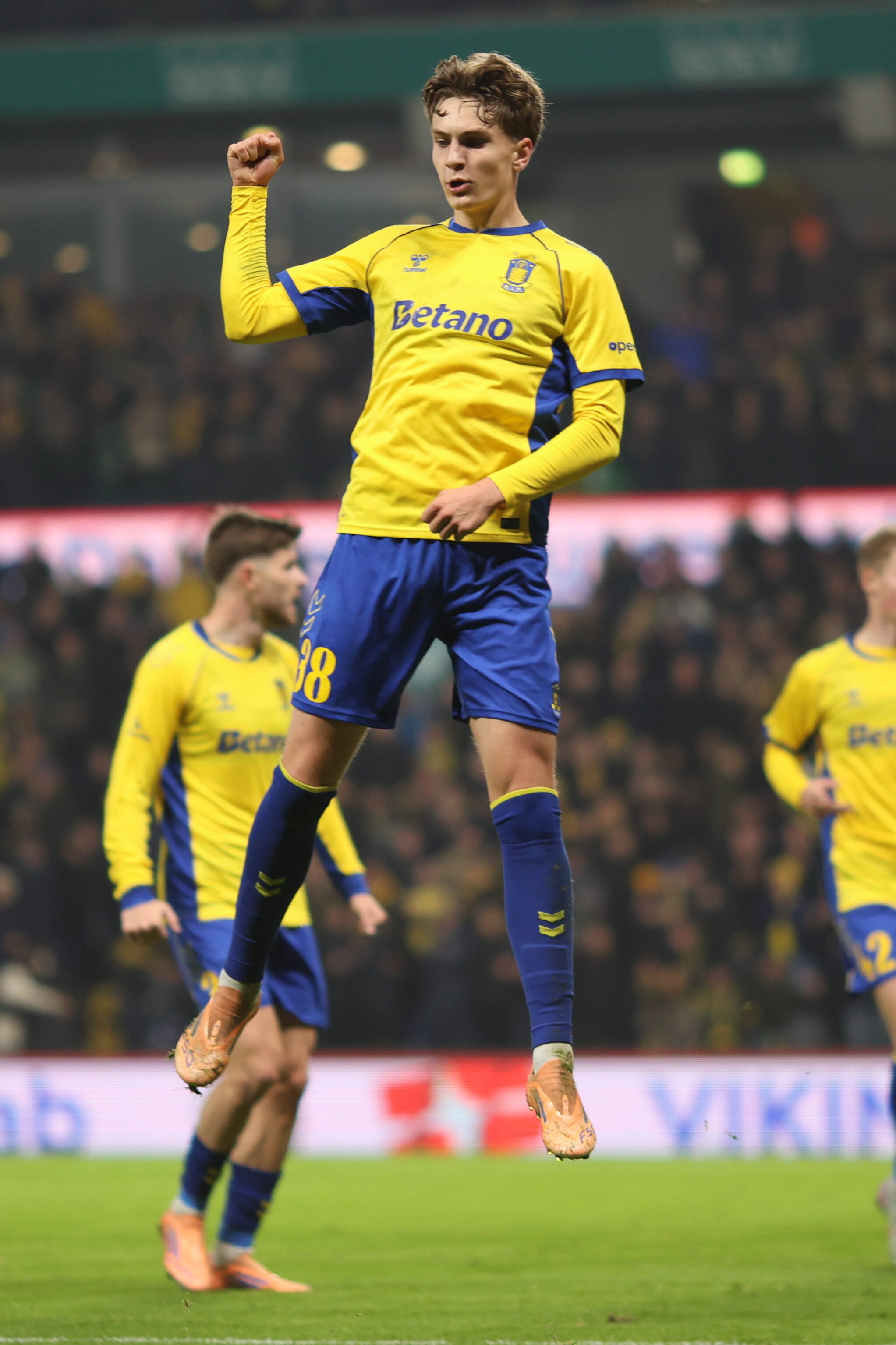
- Ambæk with Brøndby in 2025

Personal information
- Full name: Jacob Brøchner Ambæk
- Date of birth: 28 March 2008 (age 18)
- Place of birth: Copenhagen, Denmark
- Height: 1.85 m (6 ft 1 in)
- Position: Striker

Team information
- Current team: Brøndby
- Number: 38

Youth career
- –2020: AB Tårnby
- 2020–2021: A27
- 2021–2025: Brøndby

Senior career*
Years	Team	Apps	(Gls)
2025–	Brøndby	37	(10)

International career^{‡}
2023–2024	Denmark U16	12	(5)
2024–2025	Denmark U17	10	(5)
2025	Denmark U18	4	(2)
2025–	Denmark U19	7	(4)
2025–	Denmark U21	1	(0)
- * Club domestic league appearances and goals as of 23:58, 26 October 2026 (UTC) ‡ National team caps and goals as of 31 March 2026

Jacob Brøchner Ambæk (Danish pronunciation: [ˈjɑkʌp ˈpʁœknɐ ˈɑmˌpek]; born 28 March 2008) is a Danish professional footballer who plays as a striker for Danish Superliga club Brøndby.

== Club career ==
=== Brøndby ===
==== Early years ====
Ambæk began playing football with AB Tårnby and A27, the joint academy of Dragør Boldklub and Kastrup Boldklub, before joining the Brøndby academy at under-13 level. He grew up in a Brøndby-supporting family and rejected an approach from FC Copenhagen to join the club.

With Brøndby's under-17 side he won the Danish U17 League in 2022–23 and the Danish U17 Cup in both 2023 and 2024. In December 2023, he spent a week training with Italian club AS Roma as part of Brøndby's Masterclass programme. Media reported that Roma expressed interest in signing him, but no transfer followed and he returned to Brøndby.

During the 2024–25 season, he scored 31 goals in 22 appearances in the U17 league, and 14 goals in 21 matches in the U19 league, finishing as joint top scorer in the latter competition.

==== First-team breakthrough ====
Ambæk made his senior debut for Brøndby on 10 March 2025, appearing as a substitute late in an away Danish Superliga match against Randers, three days before his 17th birthday. On 18 July 2025 he signed his first professional contract, running to 31 December 2027, and was promoted to the first-team squad for the 2025–26 season, receiving shirt number 38.

He scored his first senior goal on 24 September 2025, four minutes after coming on for Filip Bundgaard, in a third-round Danish Cup tie against B.93 at Sundby Idrætspark; Brøndby won 4–1. Four days later he made his first start, in a 5–1 league victory over OB, where he was substituted off after 68 minutes to a standing ovation from the home crowd; manager Steve Cooper said he had "felt we needed pace up front" and had "enjoyed seeing his talent and confidence". On 19 October he scored his first league goal, opening the scoring in a 3–3 home draw with AGF.

In January 2026, with Ambæk still 17, Brøndby extended his contract to December 2028, the maximum permitted duration for a player under 18. On 28 March 2026, his 18th birthday, he signed a further extension running until summer 2031; football director Benjamin Schmedes described him as "both the present and future number nine at Brøndby".

On 17 April 2026 Ambæk scored a hat-trick in a 6–0 home victory over Sønderjyske, becoming at 18 years and 20 days the youngest player to score a hat-trick in the Danish Superliga's history. He surpassed a record set by Stefan K. Hansen of FC Copenhagen, who had scored a hat-trick at 18 years and 324 days in 1997.

== International career ==
Ambæk has represented Denmark at several youth levels, making twelve appearances for the under-16 side. During the November 2025 international break he represented both the under-19 and under-21 sides within the same fortnight, having been called up as a late replacement to the latter after injuries to Conrad Harder and Adam Daghim. He made his U21 debut on 18 November 2025, starting and playing the first half of Denmark's 1–0 UEFA European Under-21 Championship qualification victory over Belarus in Gori.

== Career statistics ==
As of match played 11 October 2026

Appearances and goals by club, season and competition
Club	Season	League			Danish Cup		Europe		Other		Total	
Club	Season	Division	Apps	Goals	Apps	Goals	Apps	Goals	Apps	Goals	Apps	Goals
Brøndby	2024–25	Danish Superliga	2	0	—		—		—		2	0
Brøndby	2025–26	Danish Superliga	26	7	2	1	2 (Note: Appearances in UEFA Conference League)	0	1 (Note: Appearance in Danish Superliga play-off)	0	31	8
Brøndby	2026–27	Danish Superliga	6	2	0	0	—		—		6	2
Career total			34	9	2	1	2	0	1	0	39	10
