= Oskar Fenger =

Danish footballer (born 2008)

Personal information
- Date of birth: 7 March 2008 (age 18)
- Place of birth: Roskilde, Denmark
- Height: 1.85 m (6 ft 1 in)
- Position: Striker

Team information
- Current team: Brøndby
- Number: 51

Youth career
- 2012–2021: Himmelev-Veddelev
- 2022: Holbæk B&I
- 2022–2023: Roskilde Boldklub
- 2023–2026: FC Copenhagen

Senior career*
Years	Team	Apps	(Gls)
2026–	Brøndby	9	(2)

International career^{‡}
2023	Denmark U16	6	(3)
2026–	Denmark U18	3	(0)
- * Club domestic league appearances and goals as of 07:56, 12 October 2026 (UTC) ‡ National team caps and goals as of 6 September 2026

Oskar Fenger (born 7 March 2008) is a Danish professional footballer who plays as a striker for Danish Superliga club Brøndby.

== Club career ==
In his youth, Fenger played in the academies of Himmelev-Veddelev, Holbæk B&I, and Roskilde Boldklub. After scoring 18 goals in six games with Roskilde, Fenger was coveted by all the major teams in Denmark, before ultimately signing for FC Copenhagen. After developing in their youth tanks for three years, Fenger chose to leave and sign for crosstown rivals Brøndby. He made his professional debut for the club against Sønderjyske, as a substitute in a 6–0 win on 17 April 2026. A few weeks later his contract was extended until summer 2030.

Fenger saw his playing time increase at the beginning of the 2026–27 season, and on 24 August 2026 Fenger scored his first professional goal in a 3–1 win against Silkeborg IF.

== International career ==
Fenger is a youth international for Denmark.

== Career statistics ==
As of match played 11 October 2026

Appearances and goals by club, season and competition
Club	Season	League			Danish Cup		Europe		Other		Total	
Club	Season	Division	Apps	Goals	Apps	Goals	Apps	Goals	Apps	Goals	Apps	Goals
Brøndby	2025–26	Danish Superliga	1	0	0	0	0	0	0	0	1	0
Brøndby	2026–27	Danish Superliga	9	2	0	0	—		—		9	2
Career total			10	2	0	0	0	0	0	0	10	2
