= Christopher Olivier =

Austrian footballer (born 2006)

Personal information
- Full name: Christopher Charl Olivier
- Date of birth: 31 January 2006 (age 20)
- Place of birth: Au, Austria
- Height: 1.87 m (6 ft 2 in)
- Positions: Right-back; central midfielder

Team information
- Current team: Brøndby
- Number: 3

Youth career
- 2014–2018: FC Au
- 2018–2022: AKA Vorarlberg
- 2022–2025: VfB Stuttgart

Senior career*
Years	Team	Apps	(Gls)
2024–2026	VfB Stuttgart II	47	(1)
2026–	Brøndby	2	(0)

International career^{‡}
2022	Austria U16	1	(1)
2023	Austria U17	1	(0)
2023–2024	Austria U18	4	(2)
2024	Austria U19	6	(0)
2025–	Austria U21	4	(0)
- * Club domestic league appearances and goals as of 08:05, 18 September 2026 (UTC) ‡ National team caps and goals as of 6 October 2026

Christopher Charl Olivier (born 31 January 2006) is an Austrian professional footballer who plays as a right-back for Danish Superliga club Brøndby.

== Early life ==
Olivier was born on 31 January 2006 in Au, Vorarlberg, Austria. His father, Heinrich, was born in South Africa.

== Club career ==
=== VfB Stuttgart ===
Olivier began playing for his local club FC Au before joining the Vorarlberg regional academy (AKA Vorarlberg) in 2018. In the summer of 2022, at the age of 16, Olivier joined the youth academy of VfB Stuttgart, signing initially for the under-17 team.

In April 2024 he signed a professional contract with the club.

Olivier made his debut for Stuttgart's reserve team in the 3. Liga on 25 August 2024, against SV Wehen Wiesbaden. In October 2024 he was named in the first-team squad for the first time, for a UEFA Champions League fixture against Sparta Prague, though he did not appear.

Olivier's progress was interrupted by a broken shin, a long-term injury from which he returned to full training with the reserve team in April 2025. In November 2025, Olivier was an unused substitute for Stuttgart's first team in a UEFA Europa League home win over Maccabi Tel Aviv.

=== Brøndby ===
On 10 August 2026, Olivier signed a four-year contract with Danish Superliga club Brøndby, joining from Stuttgart. According to Tipsbladet, the fee was around €1 million, with Stuttgart retaining a buy-back clause reported at €7–7.5 million.

== International career ==
In October 2025, Olivier received his first call-up to the Austria under-21 team under coach Peter Perchtold, and made his debut as a substitute in a 1–1 draw with Denmark.

== Personal life ==
Olivier's parents are Simone and Heinrich; his sister, Victoria Olivier, is an alpine skier.

== Career statistics ==
As of match played 18 September 2026

Appearances and goals by club, season and competition
Club	Season	League			National cup		Other		Total	
Club	Season	Division	Apps	Goals	Apps	Goals	Apps	Goals	Apps	Goals
VfB Stuttgart II	2024–25	3. Liga	13	1	—		—		13	1
VfB Stuttgart II	2025–26	3. Liga	34	0	—		—		34	0
VfB Stuttgart II	Total		47	1	—		—		47	1
Brøndby	2026–27	Danish Superliga	2	0	1	0	—		3	0
Career total			49	1	1	0	0	0	50	0
