= William Sonne-Schmidt =

Danish footballer (born 2007)

Personal information
- Full name: William Emil Krarup Sonne-Schmidt
- Date of birth: 12 April 2007 (age 19)
- Place of birth: Holte, Denmark
- Height: 1.93 m (6 ft 4 in)
- Position: Goalkeeper

Team information
- Current team: Brøndby
- Number: 50

Youth career
- Rudersdal Boldklub
- 2012–2019: BSV
- 2019–2026: Brøndby

Senior career*
Years	Team	Apps	(Gls)
2026–	Brøndby	1	(0)

International career^{‡}
2023	Denmark U17	2	(0)
- * Club domestic league appearances and goals as of 25 July 2026 ‡ National team caps and goals as of 25 July 2026

William Emil Krarup Sonne-Schmidt (born 12 April 2007) is a Danish professional footballer who plays as a goalkeeper for Brøndby.

== Club career ==
Sonne-Schmidt progressed through Brøndby's youth academy, having previously played for Rudersdal Boldklub and Boldklub Søllerød Vedbæk.

On 8 January 2026, Brøndby announced that Sonne-Schmidt had signed his first professional contract, running until June 2029, and had been promoted permanently to the first-team squad. According to Tipsbladet, clubs from Belgium, the Netherlands and the EFL Championship had shown interest before he committed to the club.

Sonne-Schmidt made his Danish Superliga debut on 25 July 2026, in a 1–1 away draw with AGF. The 19-year-old was told about five hours before kick-off that he would start in place of Patrick Pentz, who had travelled to Austria for the birth of his first child.

== International career ==
Sonne-Schmidt has represented Denmark at youth level.

== Career statistics ==
As of match played 25 July 2026

Appearances and goals by club, season and competition
Club	Season	League			Danish Cup		Europe		Other		Total	
Club	Season	Division	Apps	Goals	Apps	Goals	Apps	Goals	Apps	Goals	Apps	Goals
Brøndby	2026–27	Danish Superliga	1	0	0	0	—		—		1	0
Career total			1	0	0	0	0	0	0	0	1	0
