= 2026–27 Hillerød Fodbold season =

Hillerød Fodbold
2026–27 season
- Manager: Christian Lønstrup
- Danish 1st Division: Pre-season
- Danish Cup: Pre-season

The 2026–27 season is the 90th in the history of Hillerød Fodbold and their sixth consecutive season in the Danish 1st Division. The club will also compete in the Danish Cup.

== Transfers ==
=== In ===
Pos.	Player	Transferred from	Fee	Date	Source
FW	(Denmark) Basem Alkhoudari	(Denmark) Køge	Free	1 July 2026	
DF	(Denmark) Andreas Høyer	(Denmark) Thisted	Free	1 July 2026	
GK	(Denmark) Axel Mortensen	(Denmark) Bröndby IF U19	Free	1 July 2026	
DF	(Denmark) Rasmus Thelander	(Cyprus) Omonia Aradippou	Free	6 July 2026	
FW	(Iceland) Jakob Gunnar Sigurðsson	(Denmark) Lyngby BK U19	Loan	14 July 2026	

=== Out ===
Pos.	Player	Transferred to	Fee	Date	Source
FW	(Ghana) Hakim Sulemana	(Denmark) Randers	Loan return	30 June 2026	
DF	(Denmark) Gregers Arndal-Lauritzen	Retiring		1 July 2026	
MF	(Denmark) Marinus Due Grandt			1 July 2026	
GK	(Denmark) Adrian Kappenberger			1 July 2026	

== Pre-season ==
4 July 2026 Friendly	OB (Denmark)	2–0	(Denmark) Hillerød	Odense
15:00	31'; 81'

11 July 2026 Friendly	Vejle (Denmark)	1–1	(Denmark) Hillerød	Vejle
13:00

18 July 2026 Friendly	Hillerød (Denmark)	0–1	(Denmark) Lyngby
13:00

== Competitions ==
=== Overall record ===
Competition	First match	Last match	Starting round	Record							
Competition	First match	Last match	Starting round	Pld	W	D	L	GF	GA	GD	Win %
Danish 1st Division	24 July 2026		Matchday 1	0	0	0	0	0	0	+0	—
Danish Cup				0	0	0	0	0	0	+0	—
Total				0	0	0	0	0	0	+0	—

Source: Competitions

=== Danish 1st Division ===
==== Matches ====
24 July 2026 1	AaB	v	Hillerød	Aalborg
19:00
