= Raphael Canut =

Danish footballer (born 2009)

Personal information
- Full name: Raphael Canut Pedersen
- Date of birth: 31 March 2009 (age 17)
- Place of birth: Hvidovre, Denmark
- Position: Centre-back

Team information
- Current team: Brøndby
- Number: 37

Youth career
- 2014–2021: Hvidovre
- 2021–: Brøndby

Senior career*
Years	Team	Apps	(Gls)
2026–	Brøndby	7	(0)

International career^{‡}
2024–2025	Denmark U16	9	(0)
2025–	Denmark U17	14	(0)
- * Club domestic league appearances and goals as of 11:21, 13 September 2026 (UTC) ‡ National team caps and goals as of 1 June 2026

Raphael Canut Pedersen (born 31 March 2009) is a Danish professional footballer who plays as a centre-back for Danish Superliga club Brøndby.

== Early life and career ==
Canut began playing football at hometown club Hvidovre IF and was scouted by Brøndby IF at the age of 12. Brøndby academy director Bjørn Holm later said that Canut had not been a player sought by all the major Danish clubs at the time, owing to perceived weaknesses with the ball, but that the club had identified a defender with strong physical attributes and a defensive instinct.

== Club career ==
Canut progressed through Brøndby's academy, known as Masterclass, and featured in the under-19 league during the 2025–26 season despite being an under-17 age player. He joined the first-team training camp in winter 2026 under head coach Steve Cooper.

On 2 December 2025, Canut signed a contract extension with Brøndby until 31 December 2028. He made his first-team debut on 18 April 2026, coming on as a substitute for Jordi Vanlerberghe with 17 minutes remaining in a 6–0 home win over Sønderjyske. On 1 May 2026, aged 17 years and 32 days, Canut made his first start for Brøndby in a home league match against Nordsjælland, becoming the second-youngest player to start a first-team match in the club's history behind Oscar Schwartau. He played the full match in a 1–1 draw and thus surpassed the previous benchmark held by Brian Laudrup. His performance drew praise from Cooper and teammate Luis Binks.

== International career ==
Canut has represented Denmark at under-16 and under-17 levels. Under-17 head coach Morten Corlin has identified him as a long-term defensive prospect.

== Style of play ==
A right-footed centre-back, Canut is noted for his physicality, aerial ability and aggressive defending. He made his first-team debut as a right-back although his natural position is centre-back. Comparisons in Danish media have been drawn with former Brøndby and Denmark international Daniel Agger, whom Canut shares both his Hvidovre roots and physical profile with.

== Personal life ==
Canut has Brazilian heritage on his mother's side. He has been described by Brøndby academy staff as quiet and modest off the pitch, in contrast to a physical and combative on-pitch identity.

== Career statistics ==
As of match played 6 September 2026

Appearances and goals by club, season and competition
Club	Season	League			Danish Cup		Europe		Other		Total	
Club	Season	Division	Apps	Goals	Apps	Goals	Apps	Goals	Apps	Goals	Apps	Goals
Brøndby	2025–26	Danish Superliga	5	0	0	0	0	0	1 (Note: Appearance in Danish Superliga play-off)	0	6	0
Brøndby	2026–27	Danish Superliga	2	0	0	0	—		—		2	0
Career total			7	0	0	0	0	0	1	0	8	0
