= Luis Binks =

Scotland international footballer (born 2001)

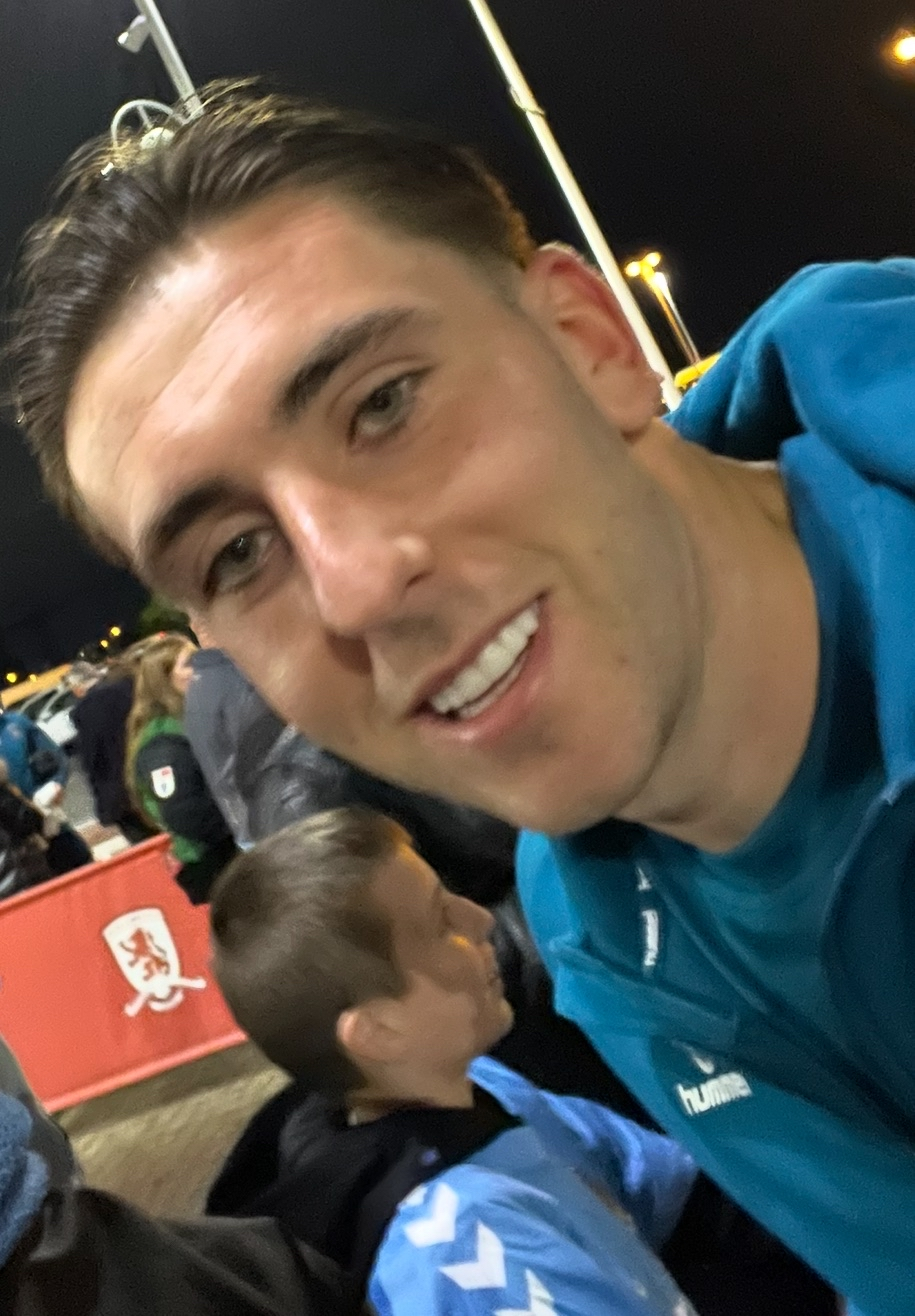
- Luis Binks in 2024.

Personal information
- Full name: Luis Thomas Binks
- Date of birth: 2 September 2001 (age 25)
- Place of birth: Gillingham, Kent, England
- Height: 6 ft 3 in (1.90 m)
- Position: Centre-back

Team information
- Current team: Brøndby
- Number: 4

Youth career
- 2007–2020: Tottenham Hotspur

Senior career*
Years	Team	Apps	(Gls)
2020	Montreal Impact	8	(0)
2020–2024	Bologna	15	(0)
2020	→ Montreal Impact (loan)	18	(0)
2022–2023	→ Como (loan)	34	(0)
2023–2024	→ Coventry City (loan)	23	(0)
2024–2025	Coventry City	25	(0)
2025–	Brøndby	43	(4)

International career^{‡}
2017	England U16	2	(0)
2017–2018	England U17	8	(0)
2018	Scotland U18	3	(0)
2018–2019	England U18	9	(1)
2019	England U19	1	(0)
2026–	Scotland	3	(0)
- * Club domestic league appearances and goals as of 08:37, 18 September 2026 (UTC) ‡ National team caps and goals as of 7 October 2026

Luis Thomas Binks (born 2 September 2001) is a professional footballer who plays as a centre-back for Danish Superliga club Brøndby, which he captains. Born in England, he represents the Scotland national team.

== Club career ==
Born in Gillingham, he attended The Howard School in Rainham, Kent. Binks is a childhood Gillingham fan and his mother Jo has worked at the club for 30 years. Binks joined the Tottenham Hotspur academy at the age of six in 2007.

=== Montreal Impact ===
On 18 February 2020, Binks left Tottenham Hotspur and signed a professional contract with Montreal Impact of Major League Soccer. He made his debut for the club on 26 February 2020 against Deportivo Saprissa during a CONCACAF Champions League Round of 16 tie. He started and played the whole match as Montreal drew 0–0 but advanced on a 2–0 aggregate. Binks made his MLS debut on the 29th of that month, playing the whole game in a 2–1 victory over the New England Revolution.

=== Bologna ===
On 13 August 2020, Binks was transferred to Serie A club Bologna, with him staying on loan with the Impact until the end of the 2020 MLS season. Binks made his debut on 26 September 2021 in a Serie A away match to Empoli which Bologna lost 4–2.

On 18 July 2022, Binks was loaned to Como for a season.

On 28 July 2023, he was loaned to EFL Championship side Coventry City.

=== Coventry City ===
On 19 June 2024, Binks made his loan transfer to Coventry City permanent for an undisclosed fee.

=== Brøndby ===
On 29 July 2025, Binks signed a five-year contract with Danish Superliga club Brøndby. He made his competitive debut on 7 August in the UEFA Conference League third qualifying round first leg, a 3–0 defeat away to Víkingur Reykjavík. Three days later he debuted in the league, scoring in the 22nd minute of a 2–1 home win over Vejle Boldklub. He also started the return leg against Víkingur on 14 August as Brøndby overturned the deficit to reach the play-off round. On 24 September he scored on his first Danish Cup appearance, opening the scoring in a 4–1 third-round win away to B.93 at Sundby Idrætspark.

Ahead of the 2026–27 season, new head coach Thomas Nørgaard named Binks club captain, with Bartosz Slisz as vice-captain and Daniel Wass moving to a newly created "club captain" role. Binks said he was proud and honoured, and thanked Wass for the support he had received from him since arriving at the club.

Binks captained the side for the first time in Brøndby's opening match of the season, away to the reigning champions AGF on 25 July 2026. Having set up Slisz for the opening goal, he conceded a penalty in the 84th minute, from which Kristian Arnstad equalised in a 1–1 draw.

== International career ==
Binks was eligible for England through birth and Scotland through his maternal grandfather being from Dunbar. He represented Scotland at under-16 in the Victory Shield between 2016 and 2017.

Binks received his first ever call-up to the senior side when he was included in Sébastien Pocognoli's first squad as Scotland manager for the 2026–27 UEFA Nations League qualifiers. He started three of the four games against Switzerland, North Macedonia and Slovenia.

== Career statistics ==
As of match played on 17 September 2026

Appearances and goals by club, season and competition
Club	Season	League			National cup (Note: Includes Coppa Italia, FA Cup, Danish Cup)		League cup (Note: Includes EFL Cup)		Europe		Other		Total	
Club	Season	Division	Apps	Goals	Apps	Goals	Apps	Goals	Apps	Goals	Apps	Goals	Apps	Goals
Tottenham Hotspur U21	2019–20	Professional Development League	—		—		—		—		2 (Note: Appearances in EFL Trophy)	0	2	0
Bologna	2020–21	Serie A	0	0	0	0	—		—		—		0	0
Bologna	2021–22	Serie A	15	0	0	0	—		—		—		15	0
Bologna	2022–23	Serie A	0	0	0	0	—		—		—		0	0
Bologna	Total		15	0	0	0	0	0	0	0	0	0	15	0
Montreal Impact (loan)	2020	Major League Soccer	19	0	0	0	—		—		7 (Note: Four appearances in MLS is Back Tournament, three appearances in CONCACAF Champions League)	0	26	0
Como 1907 (loan)	2022–23	Serie B	33	0	1	0	—		—		—		34	0
Coventry City (loan)	2023–24	Championship	23	0	4	0	1	0	—		0	0	28	0
Coventry City	2024–25	Championship	22	0	2	0	1	0	—		0	0	25	0
Brøndby	2025–26	Danish Superliga	26	2	2	1	—		4 (Note: Appearances in UEFA Conference League)	1	1 (Note: Appearance in Danish Superliga play-off)	0	33	4
Brøndby	2026–27	Danish Superliga	7	1	1	0	—		—		—		8	1
Brøndby	Total		33	3	3	1	—		4	1	1	0	41	5
Career total			145	3	10	1	2	0	4	1	10	0	171	5

=== International ===
As of match played 6 October 2026

Appearances and goals by national team and year
National team	Year	Apps	Goals
Scotland	2026	3	0
Total		3	0
