= Patrick Pentz =

Austrian footballer (born 1997)

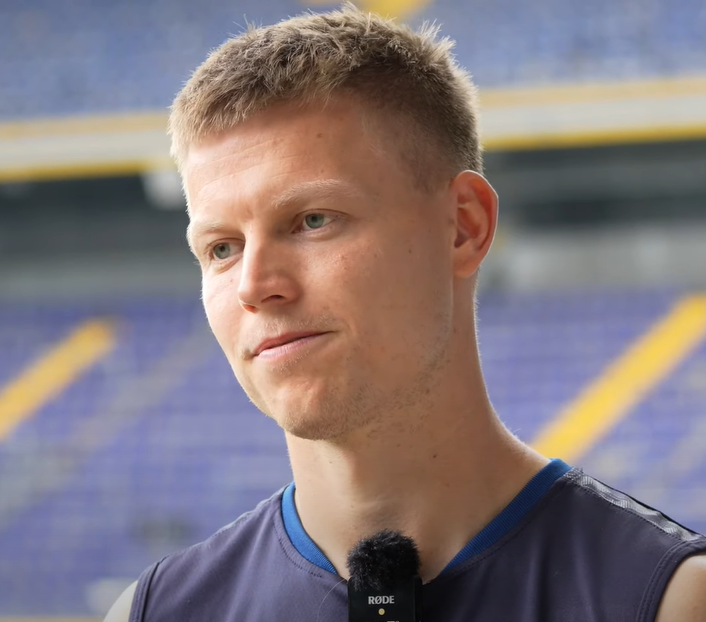
- Pentz in 2024

Personal information
- Date of birth: 2 January 1997 (age 29)
- Place of birth: Salzburg, Austria
- Height: 1.83 m (6 ft 0 in)
- Position: Goalkeeper

Team information
- Current team: Brøndby
- Number: 1

Youth career
- 2003–2006: SV Bürmoos
- 2006–2013: Red Bull Salzburg

Senior career*
Years	Team	Apps	(Gls)
2013–2017	Austria Wien II	21	(0)
2016–2022	Austria Wien	135	(0)
2022–2023	Reims	7	(0)
2023–2024	Bayer Leverkusen	0	(0)
2023–2024	→ Brøndby (loan)	27	(0)
2024–	Brøndby	67	(0)

International career^{‡}
2014–2015	Austria U19	2	(0)
2018–2019	Austria U21	3	(0)
2022–	Austria	18	(0)
- * Club domestic league appearances and goals as of 14 September 2026 ‡ National team caps and goals as of 31 March 2026

Patrick Pentz (born 2 January 1997) is an Austrian professional footballer who plays as a goalkeeper for Danish Superliga club Brøndby and the Austria national team.

== Club career ==
=== Austria Wien ===
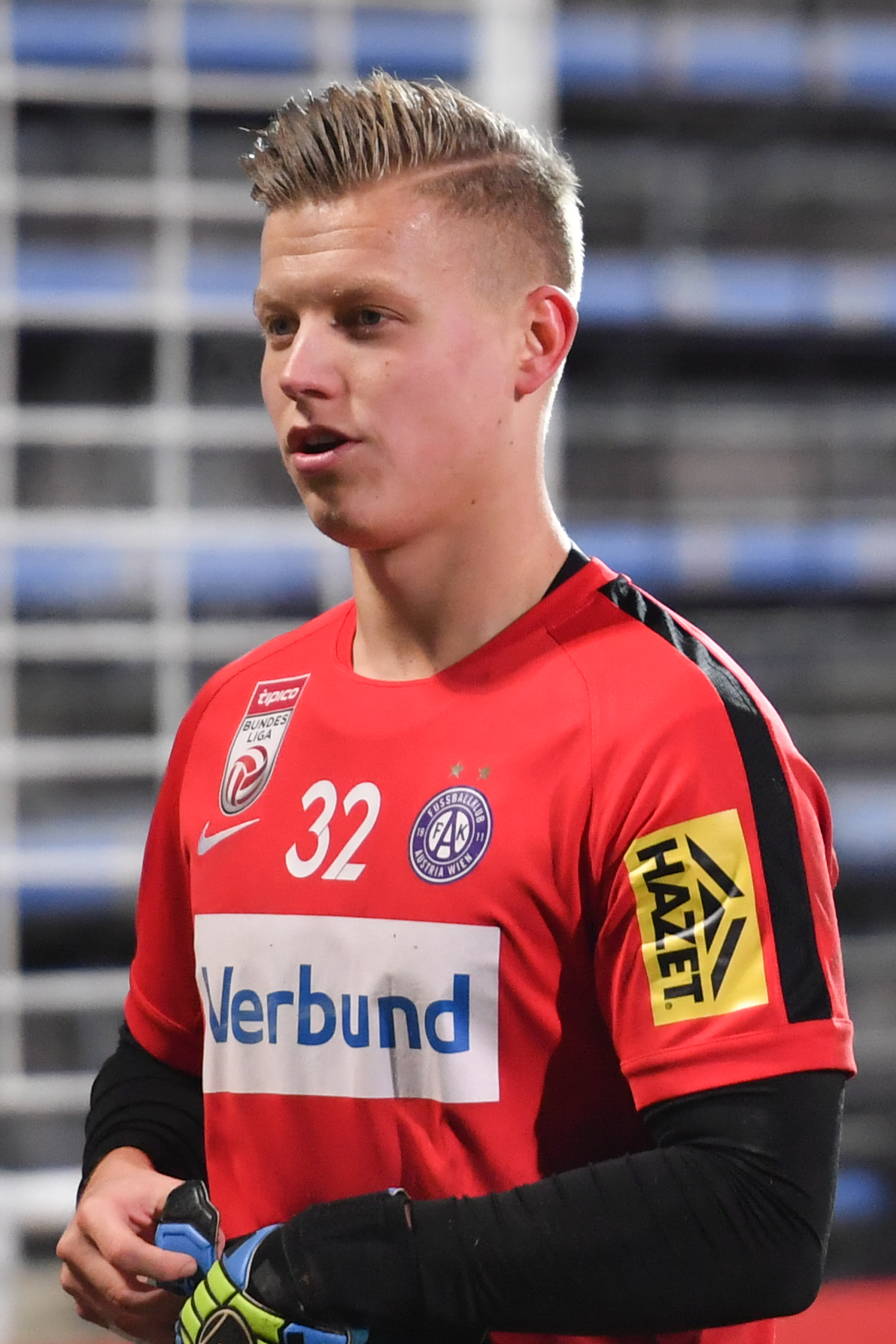
Pentz with Austria Wien in 2016.

Pentz played youth football at SV Bürmoos in the state of Salzburg before joining Red Bull Salzburg's academy in 2006. He moved to Austria Wien in 2013 and was first listed with the club's Regionalliga squad that August, making his debut for Austria Wien II in September 2014. He received his first senior call-up in April 2015 and, with both first-choice goalkeepers unavailable, made his Bundesliga debut on the final matchday of the 2015–16 season: a 3–0 win over Sturm Graz on 15 May 2016.

From the 2017–18 season, he established himself as Austria Wien's starting goalkeeper, aside from a brief spell during the 2019–20 season, when Ivan Lučić held the position, and totalled 129 Bundesliga appearances for the club. He was voted the league's best goalkeeper in both the 2020–21 and 2021–22 seasons. After nine years with Austria Wien, he left at the end of the 2021–22 campaign.

=== Reims ===
On 9 July 2022, Pentz signed a three-year contract with Reims in Ligue 1. He began the 2022–23 season as first-choice goalkeeper before later losing the position to Yehvann Diouf.

=== Bayer Leverkusen ===
On 27 January 2023, Pentz joined Bayer 04 Leverkusen on a two-and-a-half-year deal. Serving as back-up to Lukáš Hrádecký, he did not make a first-team appearance for the club.

=== Brøndby ===
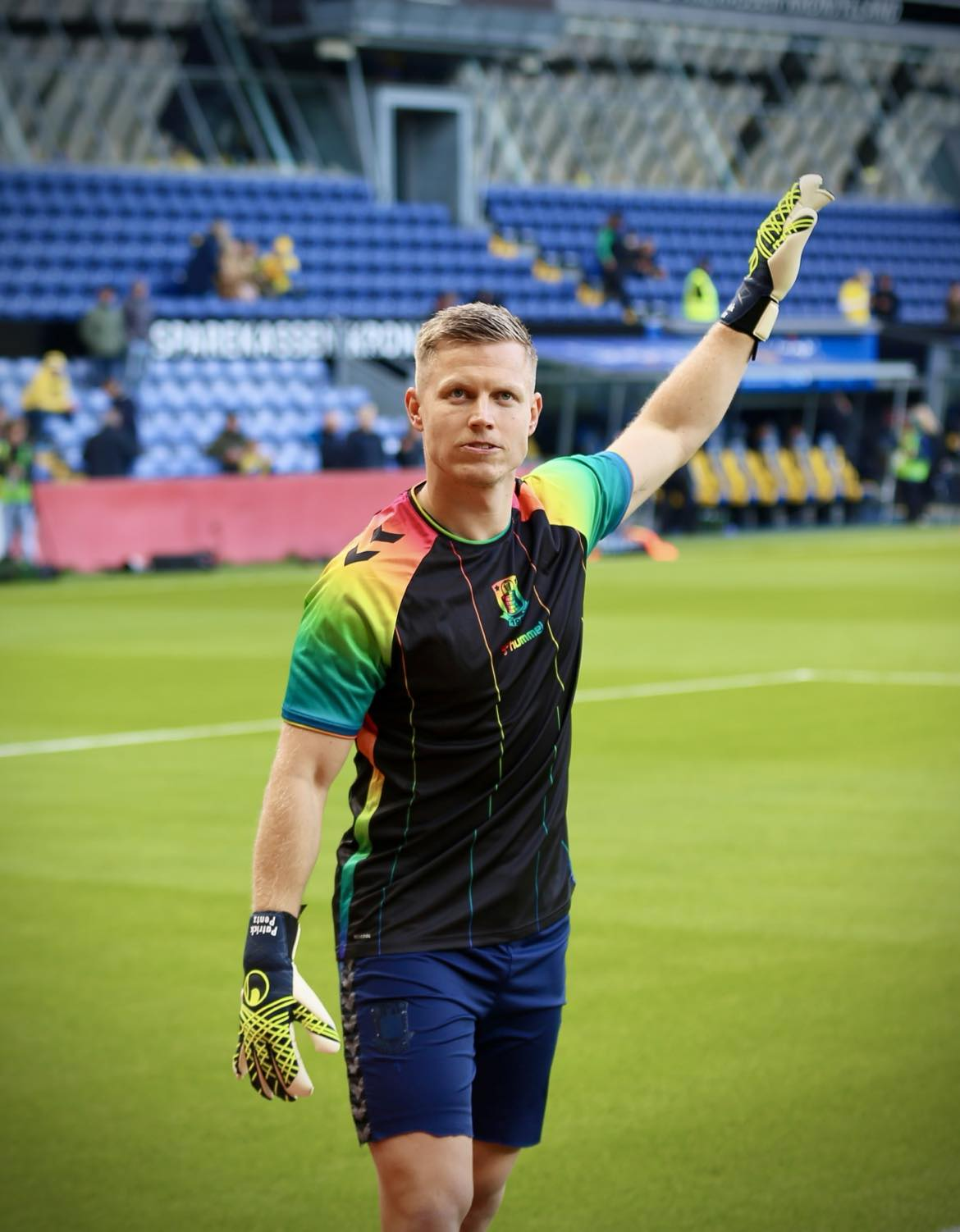
Pentz in 2024 with Brøndby

On 18 August 2023, Pentz joined Brøndby on a season-long loan. He made his competitive debut ten days later, starting and keeping a clean sheet in a 1–0 away win over Vejle Boldklub in the Danish Superliga. He remained first choice for the remainder of the season, recording 11 clean sheets in 30 competitive appearances in league and cup.

On 10 June 2024, Brøndby made the transfer permanent and Pentz signed a four-year contract. During the same window he was also linked in the media with interest from Copenhagen, Celtic and Southampton. On 7 December 2024 he was named Brøndby's Player of the Year for 2024. Later that month he was named Danish Goalkeeper of the Year, winning Tipsbladet's Det Gyldne Bur for 2024—an award voted on by the first-choice goalkeepers in the Superliga and 1st Division.

On 13 April 2025, after a 2–1 away win against Copenhagen at Parken Stadium, Pentz was shown a second yellow card for unsporting behaviour during the post-match celebrations. A melee ensued in which Copenhagen goalkeeper Diant Ramaj and Brøndby reserve Thomas Mikkelsen were also dismissed; Ramaj was later reported to have head-butted Mikkelsen. Thomas Delaney criticised Pentz's conduct in a post-match interview.

== International career ==
Pentz represented Austria at the U17, U18 and U21 levels. He made his debut for the senior national team on 29 March 2022, coming on as a substitute in the friendly match against Scotland.

On 18 May 2026, Pentz was selected in Ralf Rangnick’s 26-man squad for the 2026 FIFA World Cup, marking Austria’s first appearance in the tournament since 1998.

== Career statistics ==
=== Club ===
As of match played 17 September 2026

Appearances and goals by club, season and competition
Club	Season	League			Cup (Note: Includes Austrian Cup, Danish Cup)		Europe		Other		Total	
Club	Season	Division	Apps	Goals	Apps	Goals	Apps	Goals	Apps	Goals	Apps	Goals
Austria Wien II	2014–15	Austrian Regionalliga	5	0	—		—		—		5	0
Austria Wien II	2015–16	Austrian Regionalliga	11	0	—		—		—		11	0
Austria Wien II	2016–17	Austrian Regionalliga	4	0	—		—		—		4	0
Austria Wien II	2017–18	Austrian Regionalliga	1	0	—		—		—		1	0
Austria Wien II	Total		21	0	—		—		—		21	0
Austria Wien	2015–16	Austrian Bundesliga	1	0	0	0	—		—		1	0
Austria Wien	2016–17	Austrian Bundesliga	0	0	2	0	0	0	—		2	0
Austria Wien	2017–18	Austrian Bundesliga	24	0	2	0	5	0	—		31	0
Austria Wien	2018–19	Austrian Bundesliga	27	0	4	0	—		—		31	0
Austria Wien	2019–20	Austrian Bundesliga	16	0	0	0	—		—		16	0
Austria Wien	2020–21	Austrian Bundesliga	35	0	4	0	—		—		39	0
Austria Wien	2021–22	Austrian Bundesliga	32	0	2	0	2	0	—		36	0
Austria Wien	Total		135	0	14	0	7	0	0	0	156	0
Reims	2022–23	Ligue 1	7	0	0	0	0	0	—		7	0
Bayer Leverkusen	2022–23	Bundesliga	0	0	0	0	0	0	—		0	0
Brøndby (loan)	2023–24	Danish Superliga	27	0	3	0	—		—		30	0
Brøndby	2024–25	Danish Superliga	30	0	3	0	3 (Note: Appearances in UEFA Conference League)	0	—		36	0
Brøndby	2025–26	Danish Superliga	30	0	2	0	6	0	1 (Note: Appearance in Danish Superliga play-off)	0	39	0
Brøndby	2026–27	Danish Superliga	7	0	1	0	—		—		8	0
Brøndby	Total		94	0	9	0	9	0	1	0	113	0
Career total			257	0	23	0	16	0	1	0	297	0

=== International ===
As of match played 31 March 2026

Appearances and goals by national team and year
National team	Year	Apps	Goals
Austria	2022	4	0
Austria	2023	0	0
Austria	2024	10	0
Austria	2025	3	0
Austria	2026	1	0
Total		18	0

== Honours ==
Individual

- Austrian Bundesliga Team of the Year: 2020–21, 2021–22
- Danish Goalkeeper of the Year: 2024
- Brøndby Player of the Year: 2024
