= Mathias Jensen (footballer, born 2005) =

Danish footballer (born 2005)

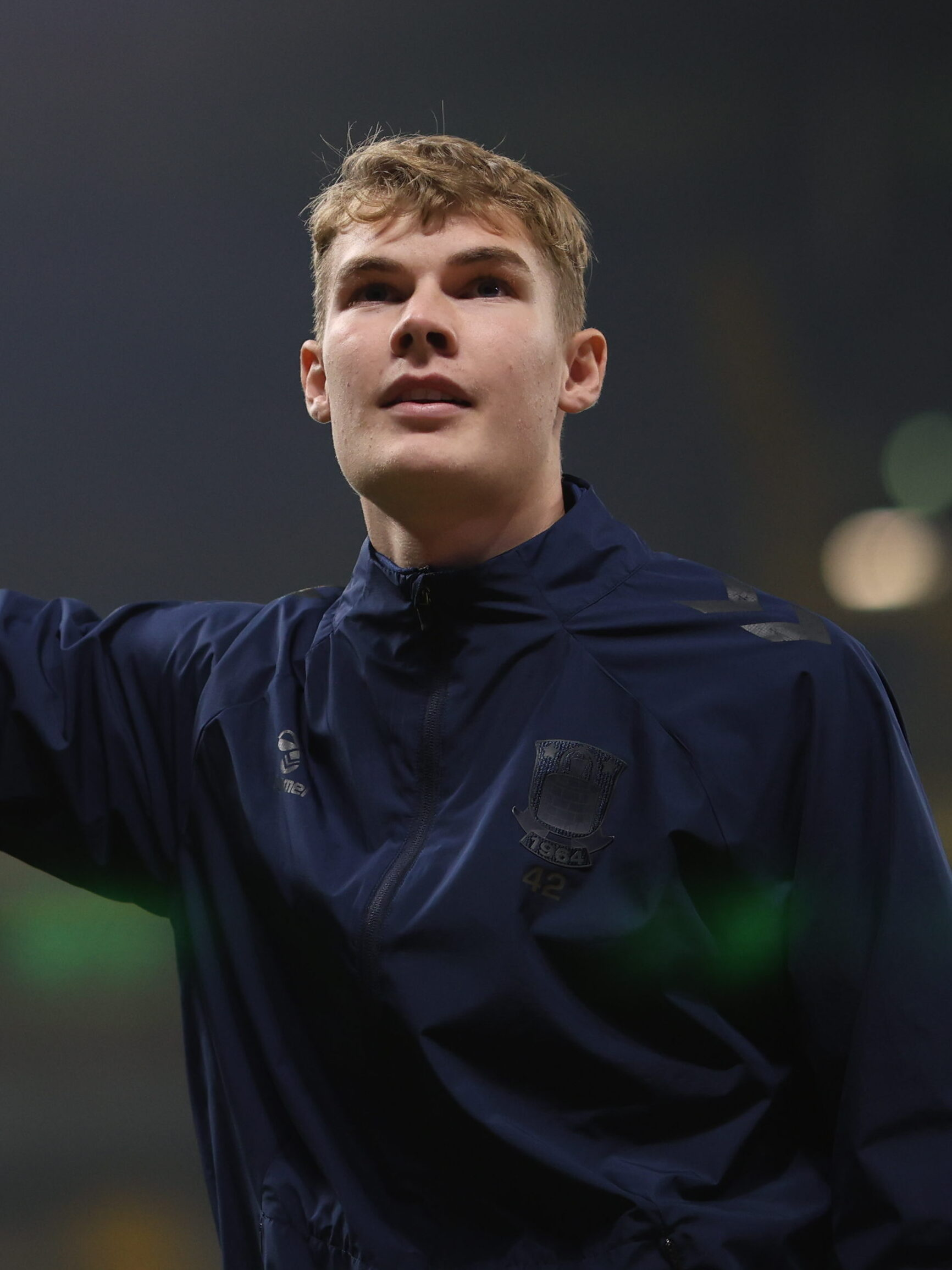
- Jensen in 2025

Personal information
- Full name: Mathias Appelgren Jensen
- Date of birth: 14 April 2005 (age 21)
- Place of birth: Glostrup, Denmark
- Height: 1.81 m (5 ft 11 in)
- Position: Midfielder

Team information
- Current team: Vejle
- Number: 8

Youth career
- 2010–2025: Brøndby

Senior career*
Years	Team	Apps	(Gls)
2025–2026	Brøndby	17	(0)
2026–	Vejle	2	(0)
- * Club domestic league appearances and goals as of 08:30, 16 September 2026 (UTC)

Mathias Appelgren Jensen (born 14 April 2005) is a Danish professional footballer who plays as a midfielder for Danish 1st Division club Vejle.

== Career ==
=== Brøndby ===
Jensen joined Brøndby's academy at the age of five. He progressed through the youth teams and became a standout player at U17 and U19 level. In early 2024, he signed a U20 contract with the club.

In July 2025, Jensen signed a two-year full-time professional contract with the club, keeping him at Brøndby until June 2027.

Shortly after signing the new deal, he was promoted to the first team ahead of the 2025–26 season and assigned shirt number 42. On 20 July 2025, he made his senior debut in the Danish Superliga, coming on as an early substitute in a 3–0 home victory over Silkeborg IF.

=== Vejle ===
On 2 September 2026, the closing day of the Danish transfer window, Jensen joined Danish 1st Division club Vejle on a permanent transfer, signing a contract until 30 June 2030 and taking the number 8 shirt. The move was for a reported guaranteed fee of €500,000, rising to €750,000 with bonuses, with Brøndby reportedly retaining a buy-back clause allowing them to re-sign him if certain conditions were met. The move followed a period in which Jensen had lost his place at Brøndby, playing 70 minutes across two of the club's opening five matches. Vejle led the second tier after six rounds at the time of his arrival.

Jensen made his debut for Vejle on 4 September, replacing Thomas Gundelund in the 65th minute of a 4–1 home win over Vendsyssel FF. The following week, on 11 September, he made his first start for the club in a 0–0 away draw against Hobro IK.

== Style of play ==
Jensen is primarily a central midfielder, but is commonly known for his versatility on the field. His tactical awareness and technical skill have allowed him to adapt to multiple positions when needed, giving his coaches additional flexibility in squad selection.

== Personal life ==
Jensen's nickname is "P", a humorous moniker that originated in his youth team when a coach jokingly responded to a teammate's question about Jensen's common surname by saying, "Should I call him Pedersen instead?" — leading to the nickname "P".

== Career statistics ==
As of match played 11 September 2026

Appearances and goals by club, season and competition
Club	Season	League			National Cup		Europe		Other		Total	
Club	Season	Division	Apps	Goals	Apps	Goals	Apps	Goals	Apps	Goals	Apps	Goals
Brøndby	2025–26	Danish Superliga	15	0	2	0	0	0	0	0	17	0
Brøndby	2026–27	Danish Superliga	2	0	0	0	—		—		2	0
Brøndby	Total		17	0	2	0	0	0	0	0	19	0
Vejle	2026–27	Danish 1st Division	2	0	0	0	—		—		2	0
Career total			19	0	2	0	0	0	0	0	21	0
