= Filip Bundgaard =

Danish footballer (born 2004)

Personal information
- Full name: Filip Bundgaard Kristensen
- Date of birth: 3 July 2004 (age 22)
- Place of birth: Randers, Denmark
- Height: 1.76 m (5 ft 9 in)
- Position: Winger

Team information
- Current team: Brøndby
- Number: 11

Youth career
- Hornbæk SF
- Randers Freja
- –2020: Randers

Senior career*
| Years | Team | Apps | (Gls) |
| 2020–2024 | Randers | 73 | (8) |
| 2024– | Brøndby | 66 | (7) |

International career^{‡}
| 2019–2020 | Denmark U16 | 7 | (0) |
| 2020 | Denmark U17 | 1 | (0) |
| 2021–2022 | Denmark U18 | 10 | (2) |
| 2022–2023 | Denmark U19 | 9 | (4) |
| 2023–2024 | Denmark U21 | 3 | (1) |
- * Club domestic league appearances and goals as of 20:25, 15 September 2026 (UTC) ‡ National team caps and goals as of 6 June 2024

Filip Bundgaard Kristensen (born 3 July 2004) is a Danish professional footballer who plays as a winger for Danish Superliga club Brøndby.

== Club career ==
=== Randers ===
Bundgaard progressed through the youth academy of Randers FC, after he started playing football for Hornbæk SF and Randers Freja. He made 28 appearances for the under-17 team, scoring 16 goals between 2018 and 2021. In the 2020–21 season, he scored five goals in 15 appearances for the under-19 side.

On 5 July 2020, Bundgaard made his professional debut for Randers' first team, coming on as a substitute in the 90th minute alongside his brother Oliver Bundgaard, in the 3–2 Danish Superliga relegation group win over Hobro IK. Thereby, he became the youngest ever Randers' player and the second youngest ever player in Superliga history, behind only Jeppe Kjær. This remained his only appearance during the 2019–20 season.

He signed his first professional contract on 30 September 2020, a three-year deal keeping him at the club until 2023. In the 2020–21 season, Bundgaard made eleven total appearances. He scored his first goal for the club on 10 November 2020 in a Danish Cup win over Aarhus Fremad, becoming Randers' youngest ever goalscorer as well as the youngest ever goalscorer in the cup. He also won his first trophy at the end of the season, as Randers beat SønderjyskE by 4–0 in the final.

Bundgaard made his European debut on 19 August 2021, coming off the bench in the 76th minute for Vito Hammershøy-Mistrati in a 1–1 draw in the UEFA Europa League qualifier against Turkish club Galatasaray.

On 17 October 2022, he extended his contract with Randers until 2026, after becoming a regular starter for the club as an 18-year-old.

=== Brøndby ===
On 1 February 2024, transfer deadline day, Brøndby signed Bundgaard to a four-and-a-half-year contract. Although the transfer fee was officially undisclosed, it was reported to be €3 million. This figure made him Randers's record sale and one of the highest transfer fees in the history of the Danish Superliga.

Bundgaard made his competitive debut for Brøndby on 18 February, replacing Yuito Suzuki in the 88th minute of a 1–0 league victory against Midtjylland. Bundgaard scored his first goal for the club on 20 May, when Suzuki made a well-timed run and selflessly squared the ball to him. Bundgaard then slotted it home, contributing to Brøndby's 2–0 victory over Silkeborg. He scored one goal in 15 appearances, including four starts, during his first half-season at the club.

Bundgaard enjoyed a strong start to the 2024–25 season, scoring in the UEFA Conference League qualifying matches against Llapi and Legia Warsaw. He also netted a brace in a 4–0 Danish Superliga away win over AaB in August 2024. In the Danish Cup, Bundgaard opened the scoring after 38 seconds with a solo effort in a 5–0 victory at Vendsyssel, helping Brøndby advance to the round of 16. Mainly an impact substitute during the season, he scored five goals in 31 appearances as Brøndby finished third in the league.

== International career ==
Bundgaard made his debut for Denmark under-16s on 26 November 2019, starting in a 1–1 friendly draw against Portugal in Antalya, Turkey, under national team coach Søren Hermansen. He made his first appearance at under-17 level the following year, on 10 September 2020, in a friendly against Germany in Aabenraa.

After one appearance for the under-17s, Bundgaard was included in the Denmark under-18 squad, making his debut in a friendly against Norway on 4 September 2021 in Selånger, Sweden. He scored his first international goal on 28 March 2022 for the under-18s in a friendly against England, his shot squirming through the arms of goalkeeper Max Thompson shortly before the break in an eventual 3–3 draw.

He was called up for the Denmark under-19s for the 2023 UEFA European Under-19 Championship qualifiers played in September 2022. He immediately scored on his debut against Georgia on 21 September, beating Sporting CP goalkeeper Papuna Beruashvili one-on-one in the first half, as Denmark won 3–1.

== Style of play ==
Bundgaard plays primarily as an attacking midfielder but is also capable of operating as a forward or in a more central role. He has been noted for his technical ability and creativity, frequently contributing to his team's offensive play by setting up goalscoring opportunities with precise passes and key assists. Bundgaard is recognised for his high work rate, agility, and proficiency in dribbling, which allows him to navigate tight spaces and challenge defenders effectively. Although he was not a prolific goalscorer early on, his dynamic movement and ability to drive the ball forward are central to his role in creating attacking chances.

== Personal life ==
Bundgaard is the younger brother of fellow professional football and Denmark youth international Oliver Bundgaard, who preceded him into Randers FC's academy where both were to spend their formative years.

== Career statistics ==
As of match played 14 September 2026

Appearances and goals by club, season and competition
| Club | Season | League | | | Danish Cup | | Europe | | Other | | Total | |
| Club | Season | Division | Apps | Goals | Apps | Goals | Apps | Goals | Apps | Goals | Apps | Goals |
|---|---|---|---|---|---|---|---|---|---|---|---|---|
| Randers | 2019–20 | Danish Superliga | 1 | 0 | 0 | 0 | — | | — | | 1 | 0 |
| Randers | 2020–21 | Danish Superliga | 9 | 0 | 2 | 1 | — | | — | | 11 | 1 |
| Randers | 2021–22 | Danish Superliga | 15 | 0 | 3 | 1 | 4 (Note: Two appearances in UEFA Europa League, two appearances in UEFA Europa Conference League) | 0 | — | | 22 | 1 |
| Randers | 2022–23 | Danish Superliga | 31 | 4 | 2 | 0 | — | | — | | 33 | 4 |
| Randers | 2023–24 | Danish Superliga | 17 | 4 | 2 | 1 | — | | — | | 19 | 5 |
| Randers | Total | | 73 | 8 | 9 | 3 | 4 | 0 | 0 | 0 | 86 | 11 |
| Brøndby | 2023–24 | Danish Superliga | 15 | 1 | 0 | 0 | — | | — | | 15 | 1 |
| Brøndby | 2024–25 | Danish Superliga | 24 | 2 | 4 | 1 | 3 (Note: Appearances in UEFA Conference League) | 2 | — | | 31 | 5 |
| Brøndby | 2026–26 | Danish Superliga | 19 | 4 | 2 | 0 | 6 | 3 | 1 (Note: Appearance in Danish Superliga play-off) | 0 | 28 | 7 |
| Brøndby | 2026–27 | Danish Superliga | 8 | 0 | 0 | 0 | — | | — | | 8 | 0 |
| Brøndby | Total | | 66 | 7 | 6 | 1 | 9 | 5 | 1 | 0 | 82 | 13 |
| Career total | | | 139 | 15 | 15 | 4 | 13 | 5 | 1 | 0 | 168 | 24 |

== Honours ==
Randers

- Danish Cup: 2020–21
