= Shō Fukuda =

Japanese footballer (born 2001)

Shō Fukuda 福田 翔
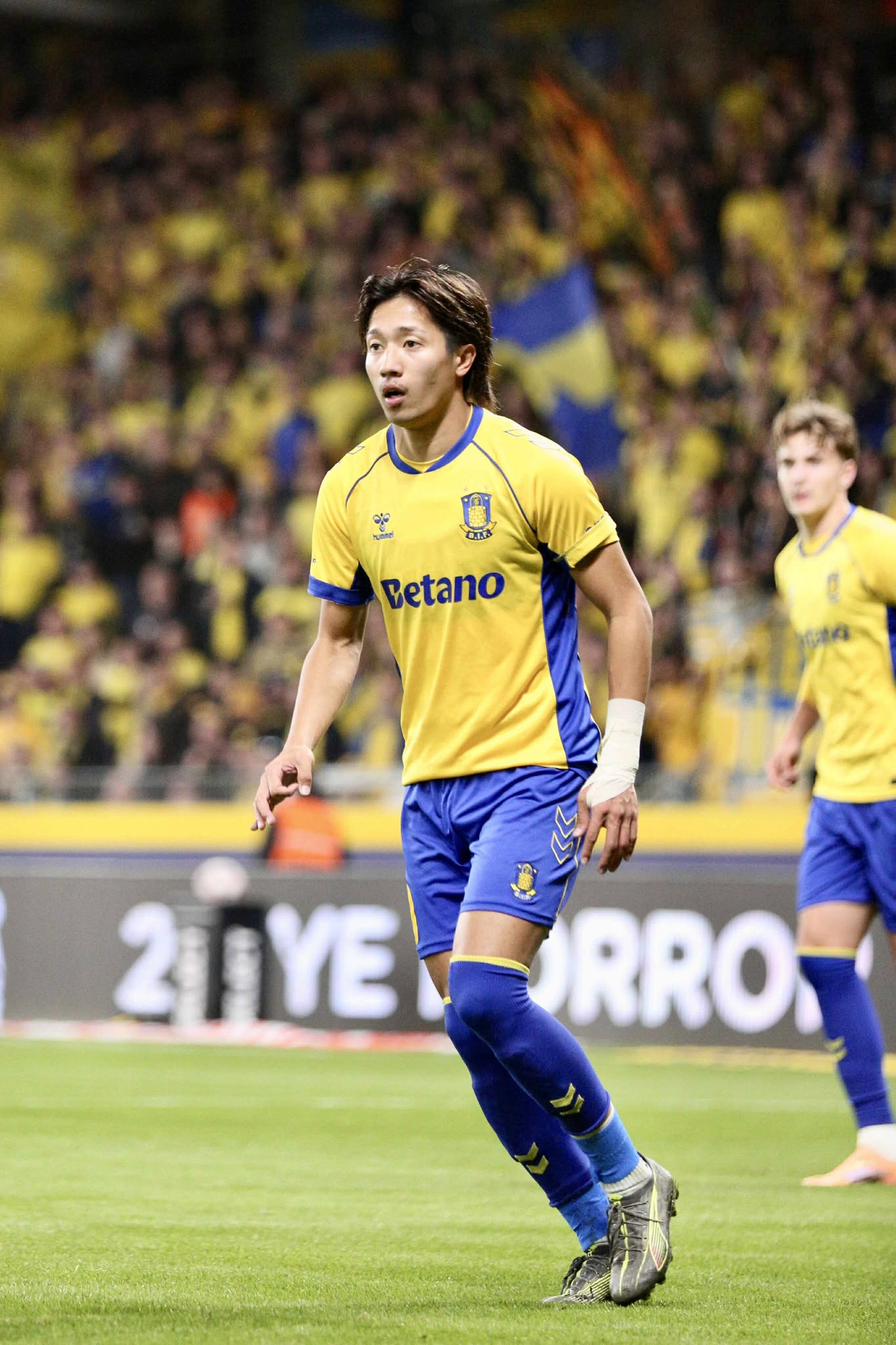
- Fukuda with Brøndby in 2025

Personal information
- Date of birth: 23 March 2001 (age 25)
- Place of birth: Kitakyushu, Fukuoka Prefecture, Japan
- Height: 1.73 m (5 ft 8 in)
- Position: Forward

Team information
- Current team: Brøndby
- Number: 19

Youth career
- –2015: Kokura Minami FC
- 2016–2018: Higashi Fukuoka High School

Senior career*
Years	Team	Apps	(Gls)
2019–2022	FC Imabari	36	(0)
2023	YSCC Yokohama	21	(11)
2023–2025	Shonan Bellmare	62	(14)
2025–	Brøndby	29	(5)
- * Club domestic league appearances and goals as of 20:28, 15 September 2026 (UTC)

Shō Fukuda (福田 翔生, Fukuda Shō; born 23 March 2001) is a Japanese professional footballer who plays as a forward for Danish Superliga club Brøndby.

His elder brother Yuya is also a professional footballer currently playing for J1 League side Gamba Osaka.

== Career ==
=== Early years ===
After playing high school football for Higashi Fukuoka, in November 2018 it was announced that Fukuda would be joining Japan Football League club FC Imabari for the 2019 season.

He played for FC Imabari for four seasons, but after never really breaking into the first team and only making 37 appearances for the club, he left the club when his contract expired in November 2022.

In December 2022, Fukuda joined J3 League team YSCC Yokohama. Following a strong run of form at the beginning of the season, Fukuda was awarded the Monthly MVP award for May, scoring three goals and helping YSCC Yokohama to an unbeaten month.

=== Shonan Bellmare ===
On 17 August 2023, it was announced that Fukuda signed with J1 League team from Kanagawa, Shonan Bellmare, on a full transfer.

=== Brøndby ===
On 26 June 2025, Danish Superliga club Brøndby announced the signing of Fukuda on a contract running to June 2029. He made his competitive debut on 24 July, replacing Clement Bischoff in the 87th minute of a 1–1 away draw with HB in the second qualifying round of the 2025–26 UEFA Europa Conference League. Fukuda scored his first goal seven days later, deciding the return leg at Brøndby Stadion with a 64th-minute strike that sealed a 1–0 win and a 2–1 aggregate victory, sending Brøndby through to the third qualifying round.

== Career statistics ==
=== Club ===
As of match played 17 September 2026

Appearances and goals by club, season and competition
Club	Season	League			National cup (Note: Includes Emperor's Cup, Danish Cup)		League cup (Note: Includes J.League Cup)		Continental		Other		Total	
Club	Season	Division	Apps	Goals	Apps	Goals	Apps	Goals	Apps	Goals	Apps	Goals	Apps	Goals
FC Imabari	2019	JFL	3	0	—		—		—		—		3	0
FC Imabari	2020	J3 League	18	0	0	0	—		—		—		18	0
FC Imabari	2021	J3 League	3	0	1	0	—		—		—		4	0
FC Imabari	2022	J3 League	12	0	0	0	—		—		12	0		
FC Imabari	Total		36	0	1	0	—		—		—		37	0
YSCC Yokohama	2023	J3 League	21	11	0	0	—		—		—		21	11
Shonan Bellmare	2023	J1 League	10	0	1	0	—		—		—		11	0
Shonan Bellmare	2024	J1 League	34	10	3	0	1	1	—		—		38	11
Shonan Bellmare	2025	J1 League	18	4	1	0	3	0	—		—		22	4
Shonan Bellmare	Total		62	14	5	0	4	1	—		—		71	15
Brøndby	2025–26	Danish Superliga	23	5	1	0	—		3 (Note: Appearances in UEFA Conference League)	1	1 (Note: Appearance in Danish Superliga play-off)	0	28	6
Brøndby	2026–27	Danish Superliga	6	0	1	1	—		—		—		7	1
Brøndby	Total		29	5	2	1	—		3	1	1	0	35	7
Career total			148	30	8	1	4	1	3	1	1	0	164	33
