= Saliou Diop =

Senegalese footballer (born 2005)

Personal information
- Full name: Serigne Saliou Diop
- Date of birth: 12 May 2005 (age 21)
- Place of birth: Senegal
- Height: 1.93 m (6 ft 4 in)
- Position: Forward

Team information
- Current team: AB
- Number: 29

Youth career
- –2024: Challenge Football Center

Senior career*
Years	Team	Apps	(Gls)
2024–2026	Brest	4	(0)
2025–2026	Brest B	16	(5)
2026–	AB	11	(3)
- * Club domestic league appearances and goals as of 15:45, 28 October 2026 (UTC)

Serigne Saliou Diop (born 12 May 2005) is a Senegalese professional footballer who plays as a forward for Danish 1st Division club AB.

== Career ==
As a youth player, Diop joined the youth academy of Senegalese side Challenge Football Center. In 2024, he signed for French Ligue 1 side Brest, where he suffered an ankle injury.

While playing for the club's reserve team, he scored fourteen goals in his first twelve appearances. On 23 February 2025, he debuted for the senior team during a 0―0 away draw with Strasbourg in the league.

On 25 June 2026, Diop signed a three-year deal with AB in Denmark.

== Style of play ==
Diop plays as a forward and is right-footed. Speaking to French newspaper Le Télégramme, French manager Franck Kerdilès described him as "a hard worker... a true 9 who's drawn to goal".
