= Adrian Kappenberger =

Danish footballer (born 1996)

Personal information
- Date of birth: 25 August 1996 (age 30)
- Place of birth: Nærum, Denmark
- Height: 1.94 m (6 ft 4 in)
- Position: Goalkeeper

Team information
- Current team: Brøndby
- Number: 16

Youth career
- 2012–2015: Oure

Senior career*
Years	Team	Apps	(Gls)
2015–2016	Oure		
2016–2017	Fredensborg BI	1	(0)
2017–2018	Helsingør	4	(0)
2018–2023	Hobro	96	(0)
2023–2024	Hvidovre	7	(0)
2024–2026	Hillerød	63	(0)
2026–	Brøndby	0	(0)
- * Club domestic league appearances and goals as of 2 June 2026

Adrian Kappenberger (born 25 August 1996) is a Danish professional footballer who plays as a goalkeeper for Danish Superliga club Brøndby.

== Career ==
Kappenberger began his career at lower-level clubs, including Oure and Fredensborg BI, before joining FC Helsingør in 2017. In June 2018, he signed with Danish Superliga club Hobro IK. There, he mainly featured as a backup to starting goalkeeper Jesper Rask.

On 11 July 2023, Kappenberger joined newly promoted Danish Superliga club Hvidovre IF on a two-year deal. On 30 May 2024, Hvidovre confirmed that they had terminated Kappenberger's contract by mutual agreement. The following day, he signed with Hillerød Fodbold on a contract until June 2026.

On 3 July 2026, Kappenberger signed a one-year contract with Danish Superliga club Brøndby. Alongside his playing career, he had been a goalkeeping coach in the club's academy, working with its under-13, under-14 and under-15 goalkeepers. He left the role before signing.
