= Ousmane Sow (footballer) =

Senegalese footballer (born 2000)

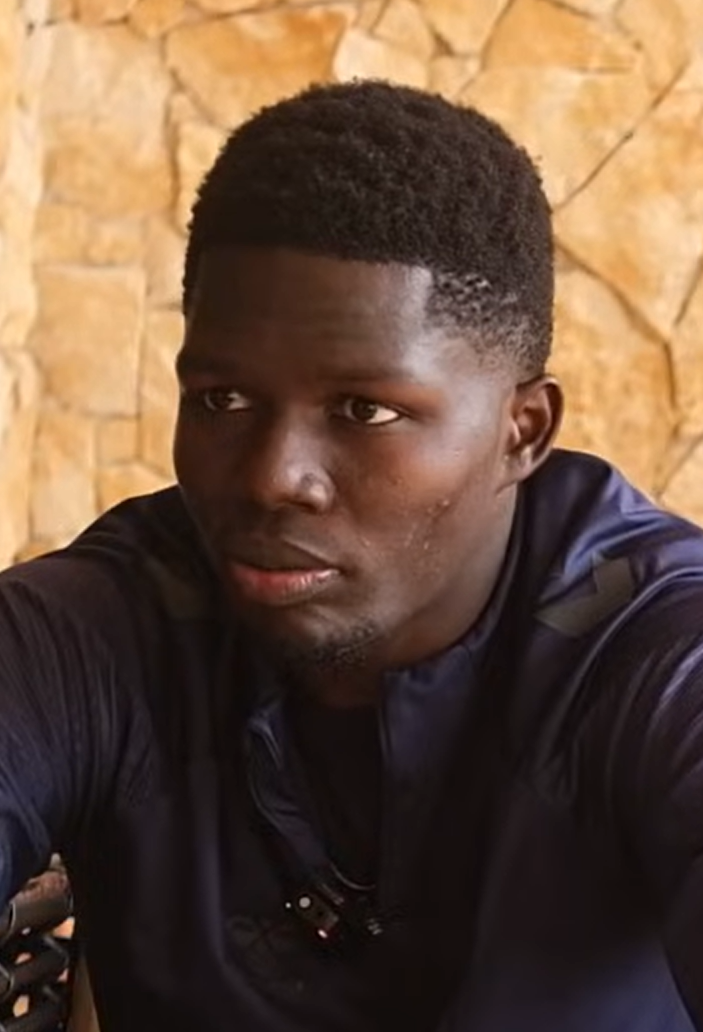
- Sow in 2026

Personal information
- Date of birth: 5 July 2000 (age 26)
- Place of birth: Kaolack, Senegal
- Height: 1.85 m (6 ft 1 in)
- Positions: Winger; forward

Team information
- Current team: Jagiellonia Białystok (on loan from Brøndby)
- Number: 30

Senior career*
Years	Team	Apps	(Gls)
2021–2022	Arles-Avignon	?	(22)
2022–2023	Furiani-Agliani	23	(6)
2023–2024	Olympic Charleroi	14	(4)
2024–2025	Lierse	32	(7)
2025–2026	Górnik Zabrze	29	(8)
2026–	Brøndby	13	(0)
2026–	→ Jagiellonia Białystok (loan)	6	(3)
- * Club domestic league appearances and goals as of 21:15, 25 October 2026 (UTC)

Ousmane Sow (born 5 July 2000) is a Senegalese professional footballer who plays as a winger or forward for Ekstraklasa club Jagiellonia Białystok, on loan from Brøndby. He has previously played in France for Arles-Avignon and Furiani-Agliani, in Belgium for Olympic Charleroi and Lierse, and in Poland for Górnik Zabrze.

== Career ==
=== Early years ===
Sow grew up in rural Senegal, without any formal football training. After being spotted playing football by a real estate agent, he moved to France to pursue a career in the sport. He played for Arles-Avignon at Régional 2 level, and scored 22 goals as they were promoted to Régional 1 level in the 2021–22 season. Despite being offered a contrat fédéral (a type of standard type of paid contract offered by semi-professional and amateur clubs in France) by Arles, for whom he had scored 35 goals total, Sow left to sign for Championnat National 2 club Furiani-Agliani in October 2022, for whom he scored six goals in 23 games.

=== Belgium and Poland ===
Sow moved to Belgium in August 2023, signing on a free transfer for Olympic Charleroi. The club provided Sow shelter as well as wages, though he only received his wages for the first two months at the club. He subsequently signed for Lierse on a one-and-a-half year contract in January 2024. Sow was paid a portion of his salary in advance and allowed to rent a house from youth team director Paul Verschoren at a cheap rate to aid his financial situation. After scoring three goals and providing three assists during the 2023–24 season, he extended his contract with the club until summer 2027.

After four goals in 19 matches for Lierse during the 2024–25 season, Sow signed for Polish Ekstraklasa side Górnik Zabrze on 5 February 2025 on a two-and-a-half year contract for a fee of €300,000.

=== Brøndby ===
On 8 January 2026, Danish Superliga club Brøndby announced the signing of Sow on a four-and-a-half-year contract, set to run until June 2030. He joined the club following a breakthrough first half of the 2025–26 season with Górnik Zabrze, during which he scored nine goals in 19 appearances across all competitions. The transfer fee was not officially disclosed; however, Danish outlet Tipsbladet reported that Brøndby paid just under DKK 19 million (approximately €2.5 million), excluding performance-related bonuses.

He made his competitive debut on 8 February in a 0–0 home draw against Randers, playing the full match.

==== Loan to Jagiellonia Białystok ====
On 17 August 2026, Sow returned to Poland to join Ekstraklasa club Jagiellonia Białystok on a loan deal, with an option to make the move permanent at the end of the season.

== Style of play ==
Sow can play as a centre forward or as a winger. Upon signing for Furiani-Agliani, manager Patrick Videira said of Sow: "[c'est un] jeune joueur doté d'une marge de progression importante et qui dispose d'énormes qualités, un bon pied gauche et une bonne pointe de vitesse" ("[he is a] young player with significant room for improvement and enormous qualities – a good left foot and good pace").
