= Mats Köhlert =

German footballer (born 1998)

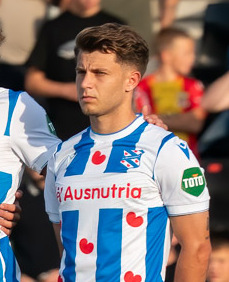
- Köhlert as a Heerenveen in 2023

Personal information
- Full name: Mats Köhlert
- Date of birth: 2 May 1998 (age 28)
- Place of birth: Hamburg, Germany
- Height: 1.69 m (5 ft 7 in)
- Positions: Left-back; left winger

Team information
- Current team: Brøndby
- Number: 27

Youth career
- SC Sperber Hamburg
- Eintracht Norderstedt
- –2013: FC St. Pauli
- 2013–2016: Hamburger SV

Senior career*
Years	Team	Apps	(Gls)
2016–2019	Hamburger SV	3	(0)
2017–2019	Hamburger SV II	56	(6)
2019–2022	Willem II	91	(9)
2022–2025	Heerenveen	95	(3)
2025–	Brøndby	22	(0)

International career^{‡}
2013–2014	Germany U16	8	(1)
2014–2015	Germany U17	15	(1)
2016	Germany U18	3	(0)
2016–2017	Germany U19	7	(2)
2019	Germany U20	2	(0)
2019	Germany U21	2	(0)
- * Club domestic league appearances and goals as of 08:33, 27 July 2026 (UTC) ‡ National team caps and goals as of 10 October 2019

Mats Köhlert (born 2 May 1998) is a German professional footballer and former child actor who plays as a left-back or left winger for Danish Superliga club Brøndby.

== Club career ==
=== Early years ===
Köhlert was born on 2 May 1998 in Hamburg and grew up in Norderstedt, just north of the city. He played youth football for SC Sperber Hamburg and Eintracht Norderstedt, and in the youth ranks of FC St. Pauli, before joining the academy of Hamburger SV in 2013.

=== Hamburger SV ===
After joining the academy in 2013, Köhlert progressed through Hamburg's youth teams, and in February 2016—having already trained with the first team during international breaks—signed his first professional contract, which ran until 30 June 2019.

From the 2016–17 season, Köhlert played for the reserve team in the fourth-tier Regionalliga Nord. He returned from a three-month injury in October 2017, and in January 2018 trained on trial with Austrian top-flight club Admira Wacker, though no transfer followed. He established himself on the right wing during the 2018–19 season, scoring four of his five reserve goals that season, and in March 2019 was called up to the first-team squad by manager Hannes Wolf. Köhlert made his professional debut on 30 March 2019, coming on as a substitute in the 78th minute for Vasilije Janjičić in a 0–0 away draw at VfL Bochum; he added two further 2. Bundesliga appearances before leaving Hamburg on the expiry of his contract that summer.

=== Willem II ===
On 1 July 2019, Köhlert signed with Eredivisie club Willem II following the expiration of his contract with Hamburger SV. At the time, the club's technical director was former Netherlands international and 2010 FIFA World Cup runner-up Joris Mathijsen, who had also played professionally for Hamburger SV.

In his debut season, Köhlert became a regular starter, featuring in all 26 Eredivisie matches prior to the suspension of the campaign due to the COVID-19 pandemic. He contributed six goals and four assists, helping Willem II finish fifth in the league and qualify for the second qualifying round of the 2020–21 UEFA Europa League.

In Europe, Willem II defeated Progrès Niederkorn of Luxembourg in the second qualifying round, but were eliminated in the third round following a 4–0 home defeat to Rangers. In the 2020–21 Eredivisie season, Köhlert made 32 appearances, though only 15 as a starter. The following campaign, he returned to the starting line-up more consistently, starting 29 times in 33 appearances during the 2021–22 Eredivisie season. Willem II were relegated to the Eerste Divisie at the end of that season.

=== Heerenveen ===
On 21 June 2022, Köhlert signed a three-year contract with Heerenveen. Operating primarily as a left-back or left wing-back, he quickly established himself as a regular starter and a key component in both defensive organisation and attacking transitions.

In the 2024–25 campaign, Köhlert delivered his most productive season at the club. He created 62 chances and completed 70 successful crosses, reflecting a significant contribution to Heerenveen's attacking phase. Defensively, he recorded 40 interceptions, 37 successful tackles, and won 122 duels over the course of the league season, highlighting his two-way effectiveness.

Köhlert's performances were recognised by the club and supporters alike, as he was named SC Heerenveen Player of the Year for the 2024–25 season. His consistent displays and work rate earned praise for balancing defensive discipline with offensive support, making him one of the side's most dependable performers.

=== Brøndby ===
On 23 May 2025, Köhlert signed a four-year contract with Danish Superliga club Brøndby, effective from 1 July 2025. He joined on a free transfer from Heerenveen, where he had been named the club's player of the season, and was brought in as an attacking left-back. Köhlert made his competitive debut in the opening round of the 2025–26 season, a 3–0 home win over Silkeborg on 20 July 2025. A regular starter, he made 21 league appearances during the season, scoring no goals and providing two assists. He was substituted off injured in a defeat at Sønderjyske on 26 April 2026; the injury ended his season, ruling him out of Brøndby's championship-group run-in and a European play-off defeat to Copenhagen.

== International career ==
In 2015, Köhlert was included in the Germany U17 national team for the 2015 UEFA European Under-17 Championship in Bulgaria. He made four appearances in the tournament, with the team managing to reach the final before losing 4–1 to France. However, the team still managed to qualify for the 2015 FIFA U-17 World Cup in Chile, with Köhlert subsequently included in Germany's squad. He appeared in all four of Germany's matches, with the team being eliminated in the round of 16 after a 2–0 defeat to Croatia.

In 2017, Köhlert was included in Germany's squad for the 2017 UEFA European Under-19 Championship in Georgia. He made one appearance in the tournament, Germany's opening match against the Netherlands, which finished as a 4–1 loss. The team were eliminated in the group stage of the tournament.

== Acting career ==
Köhlert first appeared as a child in commercials for Kinder Chocolate, BMW, IKEA, Smarties, McDonald's and Tchibo. In 2008, he played an uncredited role as a child in the film Krauts, Doubts & Rock 'n' Roll. In 2009, he appeared as Philipp in the episode "Schwanenmord" of the television series Die Pfefferkörner. Later that year, he played the role of Klein Brakelmann in the episode "Goldene Erinnerungen" of the television series Neues aus Büttenwarder. Köhlert played his first major role at the side of Maria Furtwängler as Uwe in the 2011 television film Schicksalsjahre. In the same year, he took part in the episode "Borowski und der coole Hund" of the German police procedural Tatort.

=== Filmography ===
==== Film ====
Year	Title	Role	Notes
2008	Krauts, Doubts & Rock 'n' Roll	Child	Uncredited

==== Television ====
Year	Title	Role	Notes
2009	Die Pfefferkörner	Philipp	Episode: "Schwanenmord"
2009	Neues aus Büttenwarder	Klein Brakelmann	Episode: "Goldene Erinnerungen"
2011	Schicksalsjahre	Uwe	Television film
2011	Tatort		Episode: "Borowski und der coole Hund"

== Personal life ==
Köhlert's father, Dirk Köhlert, was also a footballer, who played for Holstein Kiel and SC Norderstedt in the Regionalliga Nord, then the third tier of German football. He completed his Abitur at the Gymnasium Heidberg in 2016.

== Honours ==
Individual

- Eredivisie Team of the Month: October 2022, August 2024
