= Thomas Nørgaard (football manager) =

Danish football manager (born 1983)

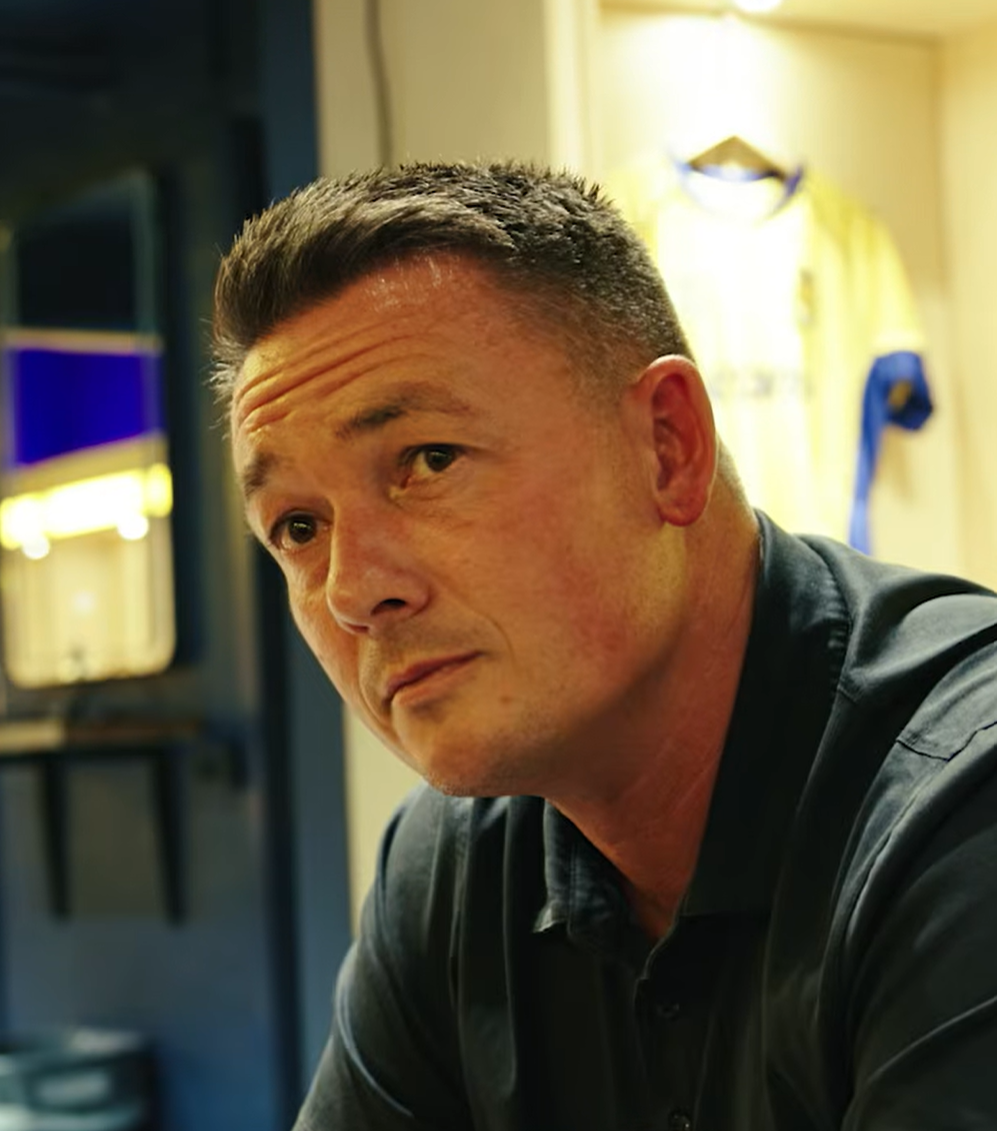
- Nørgaard in 2026

Personal information
- Full name: Thomas Darlie Nørgaard
- Date of birth: 13 April 1982 (age 44)
- Place of birth: Herlev, Denmark

Team information
- Current team: Brøndby (head coach)

Youth career
- –1997: Herlev
- 1997–2001: Brøndby

Senior career*
Years	Team	Apps	(Gls)
2001–2008	Herlev	250+	(?)
- B1973

Managerial career
- 2013–2015: AB
- 2017–2018: Lyngby
- 2020–2022: B.93
- 2022–2026: Sønderjyske
- 2026–: Brøndby
- * Club domestic league appearances and goals

Thomas Darlie Nørgaard (born 13 April 1982) is a Danish football manager who is the head coach of Danish Superliga club Brøndby IF.

A youth player at Brøndby who did not make a senior appearance, Nørgaard began coaching in his twenties and was appointed his first head-coach role at AB in 2013. After a first spell in the Superliga with Lyngby and a period as assistant at Sparta Prague, he took charge of Sønderjyske in 2022, winning the 2023–24 Danish 1st Division title to return the club to the top flight and establishing them there over the seasons that followed. He was appointed by Brøndby, the club he had represented as a youth, in 2026.

== Early life and playing career ==
Nørgaard was born on 13 April 1982 in Herlev, where he has lived his entire life. He met his future wife Pernille while both were students at Herlev Gymnasium & HF on the Team Danmark sports line; she went on to play football at the top level for Ballerup-Skovlunde Fodbold.

In 1997, at 15, Nørgaard left local club Herlev IF for Brøndby IF, where he captained both the junior and youth sides, was named the youth player of the year, and trained with the senior squad under Åge Hareide around the year 2000. He never made a first-team debut and, recognising that more talented players were emerging, chose to leave in 2001 and returned to Herlev IF. He went on to make more than 250 appearances for the club before stopping there in 2008, subsequently playing at a lower level for fellow Herlev club B1973 until injuries ended his career. Two injuries contributed to his retirement: a wrist injury sustained during his Brøndby years and a congenital deformity in one of his toes which was later operated on but from which he never fully recovered.

It was during his time at Brøndby that former head coach Tom Køhlert first suggested a future in management, telling him: "If you don't make it as a player, I think you should be a football manager. You have a good head on your shoulders and plenty of opinions." Nørgaard began coaching youth sides in Herlev from around the age of 20, taking DBU coaching qualifications alongside his playing career. He is also a qualified schoolteacher with specialisms in physical education, Danish and English. In a 2008 interview with Herlev Bladet, he stated his ambition to become a professional head coach within ten years. The article proved unexpectedly consequential: the father of AB's then-academy director John Møller read it and passed it to his son, who subsequently contacted Nørgaard and set his senior coaching career in motion.

== Managerial career ==
=== AB and Lyngby ===
Nørgaard began his coaching career as an assistant at AB in the Danish 1st Division, before being appointed head coach in 2013 at the age of 31. He left the club in 2015 following their relegation to the Danish 2nd Division.

He then joined Lyngby Boldklub as assistant to David Nielsen, and when Nielsen departed for AGF in September 2017, Nørgaard was promoted to head coach at the age of 35. The club was in financial difficulty at the time, and his spell ended in relegation from the Danish Superliga at the end of the 2017–18 season; he was sacked in June 2018. Following his departure from Lyngby, Nørgaard worked as a scout for the Denmark national team under Åge Hareide.

=== B.93 ===
In January 2020, Nørgaard was appointed head coach of Copenhagen club B93, then competing in the Danish third tier. He later described having been drawn by "a fascinating project in a great and historic club, full of love and good people". The highlight of his tenure was a cup victory over AaB. He left the club in the summer of 2022 to join Sparta Prague as assistant to newly appointed head coach Brian Priske.

=== Sønderjyske ===
In November 2022, while Nørgaard was in Denmark to celebrate a family occasion, Sønderjyske sporting director Esben Hansen approached him for an informal meeting. The contact led to his appointment as head coach in December 2022, with the club buying him out of his contract at Sparta Prague. Sønderjyske had been absent from the Superliga for two seasons. Nørgaard led them to the 2023–24 Danish 1st Division title in June 2024, securing promotion back to the top flight in their final home match of the season. His contract was extended to June 2027 in April 2024, with Nørgaard describing the project as having "moved in the direction I had hoped for".

In the 2024–25 Superliga season, Sønderjyske's return to the top flight, Nørgaard guided the club to a mid-table position, and in January 2025 declined an approach from Norwegian club Molde in order to remain in Haderslev.

In the 2025–26 season Nørgaard led Sønderjyske into the championship round, the club qualifying among the top six and entering the round in third place. A strong autumn was followed by a weaker spring, during which the club sold its top scorer Kristall Máni Ingason in January and lost Mads Agger to Polish football shortly before the championship round; Sønderjyske took only one point from their opening matches in the round and suffered a 6–0 defeat to Brøndby. The team ultimately finished sixth, one point behind Brøndby and narrowly missing out on European qualification. It was the club's best league finish since 2017.

=== Brøndby ===
On 10 June 2026, Brøndby IF appointed Nørgaard as head coach on a three-year contract until the summer of 2029, with immediate effect. He was recruited from Superliga rivals Sønderjyske a year before his contract there expired, with Brøndby triggering a release clause reported to be worth around DKK 1.4 million; he brought his assistant Lasse Frølund and an analyst, Carl-Emil Lopdrup, with him from Haderslev. The appointment came roughly three weeks after the dismissal of Steve Cooper and represented a return to the club where Nørgaard had played as a youth.

== Managerial statistics ==
As of match played 8 November 2026

Managerial record by team and tenure
Team	From	To	Record				
Team	From	To	P	W	D	L	Win %
AB	1 July 2013	30 June 2015	67	17	17	33	25.37
Lyngby	29 September 2017	30 June 2018	29	3	9	17	10.34
B.93	30 December 2019	30 June 2022	73	38	15	20	52.05
Sønderjyske	16 December 2022	30 June 2026	121	55	28	38	45.45
Brøndby	1 July 2026	Present	16	9	1	6	56.25
Total			306	122	70	114	39.87

== Honours ==
Sønderjyske

- Danish 1st Division: 2023–24
