= Denmark national under-17 football team =

National association football team

Denmark Under-17
- Association: Danish Football Association (Dansk Boldspil-Union)
- Confederation: UEFA
- Head coach: Morten Corlin
- Most caps: Tom Christensen (37)
- Top scorer: Viktor Fischer (20)
- FIFA code: DEN
First colours	Second colours

First international
- Denmark 3–1 Sweden (Tårnby, Denmark; 5 September 1964)

Biggest win
- Liechtenstein 0–11 Denmark (Csákvár, Hungary; 3 October 2016)

Biggest defeat
- Portugal 7–0 Denmark (Aveiro, Portugal; 10 March 1996)

World Cup
- Appearances: 2 (first in 2011)
- Best result: Group stage (2011)

European Championship
- Appearances: 18 (first in 1986)
- Best result: Runners-up (1994)

The Denmark national under-17 football team represents Denmark in international football at this age level and is controlled by the Danish Football Association, the governing body for football in Denmark. It was founded in 1964 as an under-16 team. In 2001, it was changed to an under-17 team.

== Competitive record ==
The Danish under-17 squad made its World Cup debut at the 2011 FIFA U-17 World Cup in Mexico.

=== FIFA U-16 and U-17 World Cup ===
==== Under-16 era ====
Edition	Round	MP	W	D*	L	GF	GA
(China) 1985	Did not qualify						
(Canada) 1987	Did not qualify						
(Scotland) 1989	Did not qualify						

*Draws also include penalty shootouts, regardless of the outcome.

==== Under-17 era ====
Edition	Round	MP	W	D*	L	GF	GA
(Italy) 1991 to (Nigeria) 2009	Did not qualify						
(Mexico) 2011	Group stage	3	0	1	2	3	8
(United Arab Emirates) 2013 to (Qatar) 2025	Did not qualify						
(Qatar) 2026	In progress	1	0	0	1	0	4
(Qatar) 2027	TBD						
(Qatar) 2028	TBD						
(Qatar) 2029	TBD						
Total:1/21	TBD	1	0	0	1	0	4

*Draws also include penalty shootouts, regardless of the outcome.

=== UEFA European Under-16 and Under-17 Championship ===
==== Under-16 era ====
Edition	Round	MP	W	D*	L	GF	GA
(Italy) 1982	did not qualify						
(West Germany) 1984	did not qualify						
(Hungary) 1985	did not qualify						
(Greece) 1986	Group phase	3	1	1	1	4	3
(France) 1987	Group phase	3	0	2	1	2	3
(Spain) 1988	did not qualify						
(Denmark) 1989	Group phase	3	1	0	2	10	9
(East Germany) 1990	Group phase	3	2	0	1	10	3
(Switzerland) 1991	Group phase	3	0	1	2	3	7
(Cyprus) 1992	Group phase	3	1	0	2	2	4
(Turkey) 1993	Did not qualify						
(Republic of Ireland) 1994	Runners-up	6	3	1	2	15	13
(Belgium) 1995	did not qualify						
(Austria) 1996	did not qualify						
(Germany) 1997	did not qualify						
(Scotland) 1998	Quarterfinals	4	1	2	1	2	3
(Czech Republic) 1999	Group phase	3	1	0	2	2	2
(Israel) 2000	Group phase	3	1	0	2	7	7
(England) 2001	did not qualify						

*Draws also include penalty shootouts, regardless of the outcome.

==== Under-17 era ====
Edition	Round	MP	W	D*	L	GF	GA
(Denmark) 2002	Quarter-finals	4	1	3	0	12	6
(Portugal) 2003	Group stage	3	1	0	2	4	5
(France) 2004	did not qualify						
(Italy) 2005	did not qualify						
(Luxembourg) 2006	did not qualify						
(Belgium) 2007	did not qualify						
(Turkey) 2008	did not qualify						
(Germany) 2009	did not qualify						
(Liechtenstein) 2010	did not qualify						
(Serbia) 2011	Semi-finals	4	3	0	1	6	4
(Slovenia) 2012	did not qualify						
(Slovakia) 2013	did not qualify						
(Malta) 2014	did not qualify						
(Bulgaria) 2015	did not qualify						
(Azerbaijan) 2016	Group stage	3	1	1	1	2	3
(Croatia) 2017	did not qualify						
(England) 2018	Group stage	3	0	0	3	2	5
(Republic of Ireland) 2019	did not qualify						
(Estonia) ~~2020~~	Cancelled due to COVID-19 pandemic						
(Cyprus) ~~2021~~	Cancelled due to COVID-19 pandemic						
(Israel) 2022	Quarter-finals	4	2	0	2	9	6
(Hungary) 2023	did not qualify						
(Cyprus) 2024	Semi-finals	5	1	2	2	5	8
(Albania) 2025	did not qualify						
(Estonia) 2026	Group stage	3	1	1	1	5	8
(Latvia) 2027	To be determined						
(Lithuania) 2028	To be determined						
(Moldova) 2029	To be determined						

*Draws also include penalty shootouts, regardless of the outcome.

== Players ==
=== Current squad ===
The following players were called up for the most recent 2026 UEFA European Under-17 Championship qualification matches.

No.	Pos.	Player	Date of birth (age)	Club
1	GK	Elias Medina	14 February 2009 (age 17)	(Danish Football Association) Brøndby
	GK	Villads Bille	12 February 2010 (age 16)	(Danish Football Association) Copenhagen
16	GK	Villads Bertelsen	23 May 2009 (age 17)	(Danish Football Association) Aalborg
	GK	Daniel Kannerup		(Danish Football Association) AGF
18	DF	Magnus Bak	3 May 2009 (age 17)	(Danish Football Association) Aalborg
3	DF	Raphael Canut	31 March 2009 (age 17)	(Danish Football Association) Brøndby
4	DF	Felix Sommer	25 May 2009 (age 17)	(Danish Football Association) Randers
13	DF	Elias Villumsen	17 February 2009 (age 17)	(Danish Football Association) Copenhagen
14	DF	Daryosh Popalzai	21 April 2009 (age 17)	(Danish Football Association) Aalborg
17	DF	Noah Madsen	9 February 2009 (age 17)	(Danish Football Association) Copenhagen
	DF	William Laugesen	5 March 2009 (age 17)	(Danish Football Association) AGF
2	DF	Xander Poulsen	2 June 2009 (age 17)	(Danish Football Association) Copenhagen
5	DF	Rilke Thomsen	9 February 2009 (age 17)	(Danish Football Association) Lyngby
	DF	Malthe Mortensen	21 April 2009 (age 17)	(Danish Football Association) Brøndby
15	DF	David Stojanović	31 December 2009 (age 16)	(Danish Football Association) Silkeborg
12	MF	Willads Tuxen	29 September 2009 (age 17)	(Danish Football Association) Brøndby
19	MF	Kasper Lorents	14 May 2009 (age 17)	(Danish Football Association) OB
	MF	Mads Jørgensen	25 February 2009 (age 17)	(Danish Football Association) Copenhagen
6	MF	Marvis Nasnas	18 December 2009 (age 16)	(Danish Football Association) Copenhagen
8	MF	Frederik Vestergaard	10 May 2009 (age 17)	(Danish Football Association) Midtjylland
	MF	Noah Manata	26 February 2009 (age 17)	(Danish Football Association) OB
21	MF	Hector Høyrup	29 March 2009 (age 17)	(Danish Football Association) Randers
	MF	Elias Broberg	4 June 2009 (age 17)	(Danish Football Association) Brøndby
	MF	Viktor Bastrup	28 February 2009 (age 17)	(Danish Football Association) Midtjylland
20	MF	Julius Wichmann	5 June 2009 (age 17)	(German Football Association) Union Berlin
	FW	William Svendgaard	25 August 2009 (age 17)	(Danish Football Association) AGF
	FW	Benjamin Nicolaisen	29 August 2009 (age 17)	(Danish Football Association) Vejle
9	FW	Mikkel Bro Hansen (captain)	25 January 2009 (age 17)	(Norwegian Football Federation) Bodø/Glimt
7	FW	Lukas Jørgensen	13 February 2009 (age 17)	(Danish Football Association) OB
10	FW	Omran Khatar	2 April 2009 (age 17)	(Danish Football Association) Køge
11	FW	Ekene Chukwuani	7 January 2009 (age 17)	(French Football Federation) Monaco (Note: Monaco is a Monégasque club playing in the French soccer league system.)
	FW	Kerim Sejdic	9 March 2009 (age 17)	(Danish Football Association) Vejle

== Head coaches ==
- 1971: (Denmark) Max Rasmussen
- 1972: (Denmark) Bent Dahl
- 1973–1979: (Denmark) Hardy Gynild
- 1980–1981: (Denmark) Kaj Christensen
- 1982: (Denmark) Hans Brun Larsen
- 1983: (Denmark) Per Simonsen
- 1984–1987: (Denmark) Kim Splidsboel
- 1987–1996: (Denmark) Poul Erik Bech
- 1996–2006: (Denmark) Hans Brun Larsen
- 2006–2008: (Denmark) Glen Riddersholm
- 2008–2012: (Denmark) Thomas Frank
- 2012–2016: (Denmark) Jan Michaelsen
- 2016: (Denmark) Per Holm
- 2017: (Denmark) Claus Nørgaard
- 2017–2018: (Denmark) Michael Pedersen
- 2018–2020: (Denmark) Søren Hermansen
- 2020-2023: (Denmark) Kenneth Weber
- 2023-2025: (Denmark) Søren Hermansen
- 2025-: (Denmark) Morten Corlin

== See also ==
- Denmark men's national football team
- Denmark men's national under-21 football team
- Denmark men's national under-19 football team
- Denmark women's national football team
- Denmark women's national under-19 football team
- Denmark women's national under-17 football team
