= Tipsbladet =

Weekly sports magazine in Denmark

- Categories: Sports magazine
- Frequency: Weekly
- Founder: Elwin Hansen
- Founded: 1948
- Country: Denmark
- Based in: Copenhagen
- Language: Danish
- Website: www.tipsbladet.dk

Tipsbladet is a weekly sports magazine focusing on football which has been in circulation since 1948. It the oldest football magazine in Scandinavia and is headquartered in Copenhagen, Denmark.

== History and profile ==
Tipsbladet was founded by Elwin Hansen in 1948. The magazine, published on a weekly basis, is based in Copenhagen. The publisher of the weekly is TIPS-bladet A/S. As of 2015, Troels Bager Thogersen was the editor-in-chief of the magazine, which exclusively focuses on national Danish football leagues.

On 5 October 2012 Tipsbladet became the Friday edition of the newspaper Ekstra Bladet. Then it began to be published as a section of its Tuesday and Friday issues. In September 2023, it was announced Tipsbladet had been acquired by the Copenhagen-headquartered digital sports media group, Better Collective, for €6.5 million.

In 1975 Tipsbladet sold 32,380 copies.
