= 2023–24 Brøndby IF season =

58th season in existence of Brøndby IF

Brøndby IF
2023–24 season
- Owner: Global Football Holdings
- Chairman: Jan Bech Andersen
- Head coach: Jesper Sørensen
- Stadium: Brøndby Stadium
- Superliga: 2nd
- Danish Cup: Fifth round
- Top goalscorer: League: Nicolai Vallys (13); All: Nicolai Vallys (13)
- Highest home attendance: 27,168 vs AGF (26 May 2024, Superliga)
- Lowest home attendance: 12,949 vs AGF (10 December 2023, Danish Cup)
- Average home league attendance: 21,647
- Biggest win: 4–0 vs Hvidovre (H) (3 December 2023, Superliga)
- Biggest defeat: 1–3 vs Nordsjælland (H) (6 August 2023, Superliga); 1–3 vs Copenhagen (A) (12 May 2024, Superliga)
Home colours	Away colours

The 2023–24 Brøndby IF season was Brøndbyernes Idrætsforening's 43rd consecutive season in top-division of the Danish football league, the 34th consecutive in Danish Superliga, and the 58th as a football club. Besides the Superliga, the club also competed in the Danish Cup. It was the second season with head coach Jesper Sørensen, after he replaced Niels Frederiksen during the 2022–23 season.

This season covers the period from 1 July 2023 to 30 June 2024. Following elimination from the Danish Cup in the fifth round, they finished second in the Danish Superliga and qualified for next season's UEFA Conference League qualifiers.

== Background and pre-season ==
The 2023–24 season is Brøndby's 43rd consecutive season in the top-division of the Danish football league. In the previous season, Brøndby had finished fifth, out of position to qualify for European football. Jesper Sørensen serves as manager for a second season, having been appointed in early-2023 after former head coach Niels Frederiksen had been dismissed. Kevin Mensah was the team's captain for a second season, after Andreas Maxsø's departure in January 2023.

There were significant changes to the playing squad ahead of the season, and key players the previous years left the club for undisclosed fees, including Mads Hermansen to Leicester City, Anis Ben Slimane to Sheffield United, Simon Hedlund to IF Elfsborg, and Blas Riveros to Talleres. The club made a high-profile signing early in the window in Jacob Rasmussen from Fiorentina, as well as Sean Klaiber from Utrecht later on. Adding to this, they signed young prospects Justin Che, Mateusz Kowalczyk, Yuito Suzuki and Emmanuel Yeboah.

The team prepared for the new season with a number of friendly matches, including matchups against Swansea City and Crystal Palace.

== Season summary ==
=== July–December ===
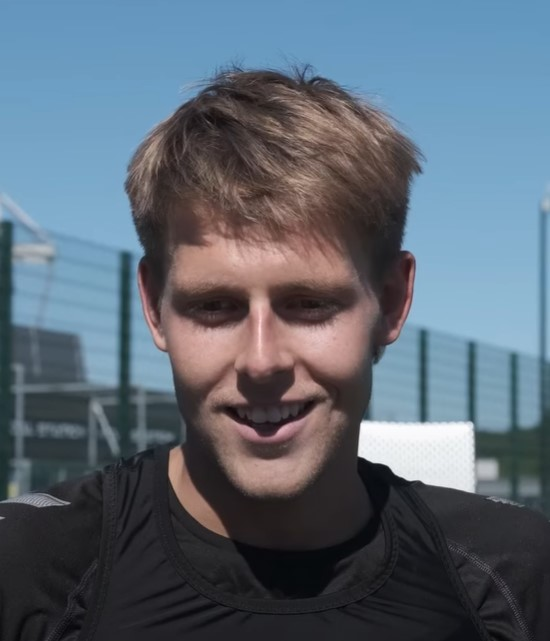
Nicolai Vallys (pictured in 2022) started the season strongly, scoring six goals in eight appearances and earning a call-up to the Denmark national team.

Brøndby had a strong start to the Danish Superliga season, securing a 2–1 away win against Silkeborg on 23 July 2023. Although they faced two subsequent losses, they rebounded with a remarkable five-game winning streak, conceding just one goal. This streak elevated them to second place in the league standings. Notably, Nicolai Vallys made a significant impact in the attack, scoring six goals in the first eight games of the season and earning the Danish Superliga Player of the Month award for August and a call-up for the Denmark national team.

Brøndby took on Copenhagen for the season's first Copenhagen Derby on 24 September, coming off the win streak. They could, however, not continue the win streak, despite dominating in the first half. Two late goals from Roony Bardghji sealed Copenhagen's 3–2 win. Just three days later, Brøndby made a strong comeback in the Danish Cup, securing a 3–0 victory against HIK. They maintained their excellent form in the subsequent two games, with wins over Hvidovre and Viborg, which catapulted them to the top of the league table. Brøndby concluded the fall season with a positive streak, remaining undefeated in eight games. Despite this, they drew half of these matches. As a result, by December 2023, they held the second position in the league table, trailing only behind Midtjylland. Additionally, their journey in the Danish Cup came to an end in December, bowing out in the quarter-finals with a 3–2 aggregate loss to AGF, despite securing a 2–1 home win in the second leg.

=== January–May ===
During the January transfer window, Brøndby strengthened their defense by acquiring Jordi Vanlerberghe from Belgian Pro League club KV Mechelen and signing Denmark youth international Filip Bundgaard from Randers. Departing the club, Håkon Evjen returned to Norwegian football, and Yousef Salech, who had been on loan to Belgian club Westerlo for the first half of the season, moved permanently to Swedish club IK Sirius.

Brøndby began 2024 with two league wins, with Patrick Pentz achieving clean sheets in 1–0 and 3–0 victories against Midtjylland and OB, including a penalty save in the former. A 1–1 draw against Vejle was followed by two more wins, finishing the regular season in second place and qualifying for the championship round. A last-minute goal by Sean Klaiber, assisted by Jacob Rasmussen, secured a 2–1 away win over Copenhagen on the first matchday of the championship round, putting Brøndby in first place. After draws against AGF and Silkeborg, they achieved a crucial win over Midtjylland with a 2–1 victory thanks to two goals from Yuito Suzuki.

Despite another Suzuki goal in a draw against Nordsjælland, Brøndby lost ground in the title race on 5 May with a 3–2 away defeat to Midtjylland, their first loss in 19 league games. This was followed by another defeat on 12 May at home to Copenhagen, dropping Brøndby from first to fourth. They bounced back with wins against Nordsjælland and Silkeborg, putting them in a position to secure the league title on the final day, leading Midtjylland by goal difference. However, a 3–2 home loss to AGF and Midtjylland's 3–3 draw with Silkeborg meant Brøndby finished their 2023–24 Danish Superliga campaign in second place, one point behind champions Midtjylland.

== Squad ==
No.	Name	Nat	Position	Since	Date of birth	Signed from
Goalkeepers
1	Patrick Pentz	(Austria)	GK	2023	2 January 1997	(Germany) Bayer Leverkusen
16	Thomas Mikkelsen	(Denmark)	GK	2021	27 August 1983	(Denmark) Lyngby
40	Jonathan Ægidius	(Denmark)	GK	2021	22 April 2002	(Denmark) Lyngby
Defenders
2	Sebastian Sebulonsen	(Norway)	DF	2022	27 January 2000	(Norway) Viking
3	Henrik Heggheim	(Norway)	DF	2021	22 April 2001	(Norway) Viking
4	Jacob Rasmussen	(Denmark)	DF	2023	28 May 1997	(Italy) Fiorentina
5	Rasmus Lauritsen	(Denmark)	DF	2023	27 February 1996	(Croatia) Dinamo Zagreb
14	Kevin Mensah (captain)	(Denmark)	DF	2017	15 May 1991	(Denmark) Esbjerg fB
18	Kevin Tshiembe	(Denmark)	DF	2021	31 March 1997	(Denmark) Lyngby
24	Marko Divković	(Croatia)	DF	2021	11 June 1999	(Slovakia) DAC Dunajská Streda
30	Jordi Vanlerberghe	(Belgium)	DF	2024	27 June 1996	(Belgium) Mechelen
31	Sean Klaiber	(Suriname)	DF	2023	31 July 1994	(Netherlands) Utrecht
32	Frederik Alves	(Denmark)	DF	2022	8 November 1999	(England) West Ham United
Midfielders
8	Mathias Greve	(Denmark)	MF	2021	11 February 1995	(Denmark) Randers
10	Daniel Wass	(Denmark)	MF	2022	31 May 1989	(Spain) Atlético Madrid
19	Bertram Kvist	(Denmark)	MF	2022	19 March 2005	(Denmark) Homegrown
20	Mateusz Kowalczyk	(Poland)	MF	2023	16 April 2004	(Poland) ŁKS Łódź
22	Josip Radošević	(Croatia)	MF	2018	3 April 1994	(Croatia) Hajduk Split
23	Christian Cappis	(United States)	MF	2021	13 August 1999	(Denmark) Hobro
Forwards
7	Nicolai Vallys	(Denmark)	FW	2022	4 September 1996	(Denmark) Silkeborg
9	Ohi Omoijuanfo	(Norway)	FW	2022	10 January 1994	(Serbia) Red Star Belgrade
11	Filip Bundgaard	(Denmark)	FW	2024	3 July 2004	(Denmark) Randers
28	Yuito Suzuki	(Japan)	FW	2023	25 October 2001	(Japan) Shimizu S-Pulse
36	Mathias Kvistgaarden	(Denmark)	FW	2020	15 April 2002	(Denmark) Homegrown
41	Oscar Schwartau	(Denmark)	FW	2022	17 May 2006	(Denmark) Homegrown
99	Emmanuel Yeboah	(Ghana)	FW	2023	25 February 2003	(Romania) CFR Cluj

=== Out on loan ===
Note: Flags indicate national team as defined under FIFA eligibility rules; some limited exceptions apply. Players may hold more than one non-FIFA nationality.

No.	Pos.	Nation	Player
—	DF	USA	Justin Che (at ADO Den Haag until 30 June 2024)
—	MF	USA	Christian Cappis (at Molde until 31 December 2023)

No.	Pos.	Nation	Player
—	FW	SWE	Carl Björk (at IFK Norrköping until 30 June 2024)

== Transfers ==
=== In ===
Date	Pos.	Nat.	Name	Club	Fee	Ref.
14 July 2023	DF	(Denmark)	Jacob Rasmussen	(Italy) Fiorentina	€3.00m	
14 July 2023	DF	(United States)	Justin Che	(United States) FC Dallas	Undisclosed	
2 August 2023	MF	(Poland)	Mateusz Kowalczyk	(Poland) ŁKS Łódź	€1.20m	
11 August 2023	FW	(Japan)	Yuito Suzuki	(Japan) Shimizu S-Pulse	€600k	
19 August 2023	FW	(Ghana)	Emmanuel Yeboah	(Romania) CFR Cluj	€1.50m	
1 September 2023	DF	(Suriname)	Sean Klaiber	(Netherlands) Utrecht	€1.10m	
29 January 2024	DF	(Belgium)	Jordi Vanlerberghe	(Belgium) Mechelen	€600k	
1 February 2024	FW	(Denmark)	Filip Bundgaard	(Denmark) Randers	€3.00m	

=== Out ===
Date	Pos.	Nat.	Name	Club	Fee	Ref.
30 May 2023	MF	(Denmark)	Andreas Pyndt	(Denmark) Silkeborg	Free	
20 June 2023	DF	(Denmark)	Christian Friedrich	(Denmark) Næstved	Undisclosed	
13 July 2023	MF	(Tunisia)	Anis Ben Slimane	(England) Sheffield United	Undisclosed	
18 July 2023	GK	(Denmark)	Mads Hermansen	(England) Leicester City	Undisclosed	
7 August 2023	MF	(Denmark)	Marinus Larsen	(Denmark) AC Horsens	Undisclosed	
20 August 2023	FW	(Sweden)	Simon Hedlund	(Sweden) IF Elfsborg	Undisclosed	
21 August 2023	DF	(Sweden)	Rasmus Wikström	(Sweden) Mjällby AIF	Undisclosed	
29 August 2023	MF	(New Zealand)	Joe Bell	(Norway) Viking	Undisclosed	
1 September 2023	DF	(Paraguay)	Blas Riveros	(Argentina) Talleres	Undisclosed	
27 January 2024	MF	(Norway)	Håkon Evjen	(Norway) Bodø/Glimt	€2.50m	
22 February 2024	FW	(Denmark)	Yousef Salech	(Sweden) IK Sirius	€600k	

=== Loans in ===
Date	Pos.	Nat.	Name	Club	Duration	Ref.
18 August 2023	GK	(Austria)	Patrick Pentz	(Germany) Bayer Leverkusen	30 June 2024	

=== Loans out ===
Date	Pos.	Nat.	Name	Club	Duration	Ref.
17 August 2023	DF	(United States)	Justin Che	(Netherlands) ADO Den Haag	30 June 2024	
18 August 2023	FW	(Sweden)	Carl Björk	(Sweden) IFK Norrköping	30 June 2024	
28 August 2023	FW	(Denmark)	Yousef Salech	(Belgium) Beveren	30 June 2024	
1 September 2023	MF	(United States)	Christian Cappis	(Norway) Molde	31 December 2023	

=== New contracts ===
Date	Pos.	Nat.	Name	Contract until	Team	Ref.
2 June 2023	DF	(Denmark)	Kevin Mensah	31 December 2024	First Team	
19 July 2023	GK	(Denmark)	Jonathan Ægidius	30 June 2027	First Team	
4 June 2024	GK	(Denmark)	Thomas Mikkelsen	30 June 2025	First Team	

== Non-competitive ==
=== Pre-season friendlies ===
6 July 2023 Friendly	Brøndby	2–1	Hillerød	Brøndbyvester
18:00 CEST	Wikström 59'; Kvistgaarden 77'	Report	Julø 52'	Stadium: Bane 1

11 July 2023 Friendly	Swansea City	0–0	Brøndby	Upper Killay
17:00 CEST		Report		Stadium: Fairwood Training Ground; Attendance: 0 (behind-closed-doors)

15 July 2023 Friendly	Crystal Palace	2–2	Brøndby	Beckenham
14:00 BST	Rak-Sakyi 35'; Mateta 50'	Report	Kvistgaarden 47', 54'	Stadium: Palace Academy; Attendance: 0 (behind-closed-doors)

17 July 2023 Friendly	Brøndby	8–2	B.93	Brøndbyvester
14:00 CEST	Salech 8', 51'; Greve 12', 42'; Unknown 19' (o.g.); Hedlund 55', 60'; Bischoff 84'	Report	Mathys 59'; Heimer 78'	Stadium: Bane 1

== Competitions ==
Competition	First match	Last match	Starting round	Record							
Competition	First match	Last match	Starting round	Pld	W	D	L	GF	GA	GD	Win %
Superliga	23 July 2023	26 May 2024	Matchday 1	32	18	8	6	60	35	+25	56.25
Oddset Pokalen	27 September 2023	10 December 2023	Third round	4	3	0	1	7	3	+4	75.00
Total				36	21	8	7	67	38	+29	58.33

Source: Soccerway

Source: Competitive matches

=== Danish Superliga ===
==== Regular season ====
Pos	Team	Pld	W	D	L	GF	GA	GD	Pts	Qualification
1	Midtjylland	22	15	3	4	43	23	+20	48	Qualification for the Championship round
2	Brøndby	22	14	5	3	44	20	+24	47	Qualification for the Championship round
3	Copenhagen	22	14	3	5	45	23	+22	45	Qualification for the Championship round
4	Nordsjælland	22	10	7	5	35	21	+14	37	Qualification for the Championship round
5	AGF	22	9	9	4	26	21	+5	36	Qualification for the Championship round

Source: Danish Football Association (in Danish), Soccerway
Rules for classification: 1) Points; 2) Goal difference; 3) Goals scored; 4) Away goals scored; 5) Play-off (played on neutral ground if determining teams for different rounds); 6) Draw.

==== Superliga results summary ====
Overall								Home						Away					
Pld	W	D	L	GF	GA	GD	Pts	W	D	L	GF	GA	GD	W	D	L	GF	GA	GD
32	18	8	6	60	35	+25	62	9	3	4	30	18	+12	9	5	2	30	17	+13

Source: Superstats

==== Results by round – Regular season ====
Matchday	1	2	3	4	5	6	7	8	9	10	11	12	13	14	15	16	17	18	19	20	21	22	23	24	25	26	27	28	29	30	31	32
Ground	A	H	A	H	A	A	H	A	H	A	H	A	H	H	A	A	H	H	A	H	A	H	A	H	A	H	A	A	H	H	A	H
Result	W	L	L	W	W	W	W	W	L	W	W	D	W	D	D	D	W	W	W	D	W	W	W	D	D	W	D	L	L	W	W	L
Position	2	5	8	5	3	3	3	2	4	2	1	3	2	2	2	3	2	1	1	2	2	2	1	1	1	1	1	1	4	2	1	2

A = Away; H = Home; W = Win; D = Draw; L = Loss

==== Championship round ====
Pos	Team	Pld	W	D	L	GF	GA	GD	Pts	
1	Midtjylland (C)	32	19	6	7	62	43	+19	63	Qualification for the Champions League second qualifying round
2	Brøndby	32	18	8	6	60	35	+25	62	Qualification for the Conference League second qualifying round
3	Copenhagen (O)	32	18	5	9	64	38	+26	59	Qualification for the European play-off match
4	Nordsjælland	32	16	10	6	60	34	+26	58	
5	AGF	32	11	11	10	42	46	−4	44	

Source: Danish Football Association (in Danish), Soccerway
Rules for classification: 1) Points; 2) Goal difference; 3) Goals scored; 4) Away goals scored; 5) Play-off (played on neutral ground if determining teams for different rounds); 6) Draw.
(C) Champions; (O) Play-off winners

==== Results by round – Championship round ====
Matchday	1	2	3	4	5	6	7	8	9	10
Ground	A	H	A	H	A	A	H	H	A	H
Result	W	D	D	W	D	L	L	W	W	L
Position	1	1	1	1	1	1	4	2	1	2

A = Away; H = Home; W = Win; D = Draw; L = Loss

==== Regular season ====
23 July 2023 1	Silkeborg	1–2	Brøndby	Silkeborg
18:00 CEST	Salquist (yellow card) 3'; Adamsen 5' (Engel); Kusk (yellow card) 82'	Summary	Vallys 16' (Kvistgaarden); Evjen 65' (Kvistgaarden); Salech (yellow card) 85'; Kvistgaarden (yellow card) 90+3'	Stadium: JYSK Park; Attendance: 6,084; Referee: Jakob Kehlet

30 July 2023 2	Brøndby	1–2	OB	Brøndbyvester
18:00 CEST	Vallys 54' (Evjen)	Summary	Adelgaard (yellow card) 26'; Manneh (yellow card) 41', (goal) 63'; Al Hajj (yellow card) 26'; Kadrii	Stadium: Brøndby Stadium; Attendance: 22,734; Referee: Jakob Sundberg

6 August 2023 3	Nordsjælland	3–1	Brøndby	Farum
18:00 CEST	Diomande (yellow card) 47'; Ingvartsen; Nuamah 74'; Frese 80' (Nuamah)	Summary	Vallys 37' (Omoijuanfo); Radošević (yellow card) 54'; Heggheim (yellow card) 56'	Stadium: Right to Dream Park; Attendance: 6,564; Referee: Morten Krogh

13 August 2023 4	Brøndby	3–0	Lyngby	Brøndbyvester
18:00 CEST	Vallys 28' (Riveros); Riveros (yellow card) 61'; Kvistgaarden 84' (Mensah); Jensen 73' (o.g.); Riveros (yellow card) 90+5'	Summary	Hämäläinen (yellow card) 11'; Finnsson (yellow card) 40' (yellow-red card) 49'	Stadium: Brøndby Stadium; Attendance: 20,108; Referee: Mads-Kristoffer Kristoffersen

20 August 2023 5	Midtjylland	0–1	Brøndby	Herning
18:00 CEST	Charles (yellow card) 33'	Summary	Greve (yellow card) 40'; Heggheim (yellow card) 51'; Rasmussen (yellow card) 59'; Vallys 82' (Divković)	Stadium: MCH Arena; Attendance: 10,522; Referee: Jørgen Daugbjerg Burchardt

28 August 2023 6	Vejle	0–1	Brøndby	Vejle
19:00 CEST	Bušuladžić (yellow card) 30'; Lauritsen (yellow card) 37'; Ezatolahi (yellow card) 90+4'; Albentosa (yellow card) 90+9'	Summary	Alves (yellow card) 40'; Greve (yellow card) 69'; Omoijuanfo 74' (pen.)	Stadium: Vejle Stadium; Attendance: 10,408; Referee: Jakob Sundberg

3 September 2023 7	Brøndby	3–1	Randers	Brøndbyvester
16:00 CEST	Rasmussen 9' (Kvistgaarden); Omoijuanfo 22' (Wass); Kvistgaarden 35' (Divković)	Summary	Olsen (yellow card) 45+2'; Høegh 22' (Wass)	Stadium: Brøndby Stadium; Attendance: 21,081; Referee: Jacob Karlsen

17 September 2023 8	AGF	0–3	Brøndby	Aarhus
18:00 CEST	Peacock-Farrell (red card) 23'; Poulsen (yellow card) 51'; Anderson (yellow card) 64'	Summary	Wass 25' (pen.), (yellow card) 28'; Omoijuanfo 40' (Radošević); Alves (yellow card) 45+3'; Vallys 52' (Kvistgaarden)	Stadium: Ceres Park; Attendance: 18,386; Referee: Mikkel Redder

24 September 2023 9	Brøndby	2–3	Copenhagen	Brøndbyvester
14:00 CEST	Radošević 25'; Heggheim (yellow card) 48'; Omoijuanfo 69' (Divković)	Summary	Elyounoussi (yellow card) 35'; Achouri (yellow card) 41'; Gonçalves 54' (Achouri); Lund (yellow card) 82'; Bardghji 84' (Óskarsson) 89'	Stadium: Brøndby Stadium; Attendance: 25,884; Referee: Morten Krogh

1 October 2023 10	Hvidovre	0–3	Brøndby	Hvidovre
16:00 CEST	Iljazovski (yellow card) 18'; Thomsen (yellow card) 68'	Summary	Divković 10' (Vallys); Kvistgaarden 50' (Divković), (yellow card) 62'; Suzuki 86' (Evjen)	Stadium: Pro Ventilation Arena; Attendance: 9,324; Referee: Jakob Sundberg

8 October 2023 11	Brøndby	1–0	Viborg	Brøndbyvester
16:00 CEST	Alves (yellow card) 35'; Divković (yellow card) 40'; Kvistgaarden (yellow card) 40', (goal) 73' (Wass); Oscar Schwartau (yellow card) 90+2'	Summary	Said (yellow card) 40'; Mbom (yellow card) 42'; Søndergaard (yellow card) 52'	Stadium: Brøndby Stadium; Attendance: 21,851; Referee: Mads-Kristoffer Kristoffersen

22 October 2023 12	Randers	2–2	Brøndby	Randers
18:00 CEST	Coulibaly 34' (Björkengren); Nordli (yellow card) 49'; Odey 59'; Björkengren (yellow card) 83'	Report	Rasmussen (yellow card) 27'; Radošević 31'; Tshiembe (yellow card) 72'; Alves (yellow card) 77'; Divković 81' (Tshiembe)	Stadium: Cepheus Park Randers; Attendance: 7,871; Referee: Jonas Hansen

29 October 2023 13	Brøndby	2–1	Nordsjælland	Brøndbyvester
18:00 CET	Kvistgaarden 16' (Vallys); Radošević (yellow card) 45'; Vallys 64' (Rasmussen); Lauritsen (yellow card) 85'; Rasmussen (yellow card) 88'	Summary	Ingvartsen 35' (pen.)	Stadium: Brøndby Stadium; Attendance: 20,011; Referee: Sandi Putros

6 November 2023 14	Brøndby	1–1	AGF	Brøndbyvester
19:00 CET	Vallys 8' (Wass); Kvistgaarden (yellow card) 16'; Alves (yellow card) 47'	Summary	Mortensen 66' (Beijmo); Andersen (yellow card) 47'	Stadium: Brøndby Stadium; Attendance: 21,063; Referee: Jakob Sundberg

12 November 2023 15	Copenhagen	0–0	Brøndby	Copenhagen
12:00 CET	Vavro (yellow card) 11'; Gonçalves (yellow card) 43'; Achouri (yellow card) 90+1'	Report	Rasmussen (yellow card) 15'	Stadium: Parken Stadium; Attendance: 33,583; Referee: Mads Kristoffersen

26 November 2023 16	Lyngby	3–3	Brøndby	Kongens Lyngby
18:00 CET	Muniesa (yellow card) 34'; Winther 67' (Magnússon); Jensen 84'; Guðjohnsen 90+5' (Chukwuani)	Report	Vallys 6' (Kvistgaarden); Tshiembe (red card) 31'; Klaiber 43' (Greve) 89'; Alves (yellow card) 62'; Wass (yellow card) 70'; Pentz (yellow card) 79'	Stadium: Lyngby Stadium; Attendance: 9,971; Referee: Kyriakos Athanasiou

3 December 2023 17	Brøndby	4–0	Hvidovre	Brøndbyvester
16:00 CET	Vallys 9' (Greve); Divković (yellow card) 14'; Omoijuanfo 40' (pen.); Alves 48' (Wass); Greve 88' (Suzuki)	Summary	Iljazovski (yellow card) 47'	Stadium: Brøndby Stadium; Attendance: 16,785; Referee: Jørgen Daugbjerg Burchardt

18 February 2024 18	Brøndby	1–0	Midtjylland	Brøndbyvester
18:00 CET	Heggheim (red card) 17'; Omoijuanfo 45+4'; Wass (yellow card) 49'; Rasmussen (yellow card) 85'	Summary	Cho (penalty missed) , (yellow card) 85'; Gabriel (yellow card) 31'; Paulinho (yellow card) 39'; Gogorza (yellow card) 90+3'	Stadium: Brøndby Stadium; Attendance: 21,366; Referee: Jakob Kehlet

25 February 2024 19	OB	0–3	Brøndby	Odense
16:00 CET	Trybull (yellow card) 27'; Paulsen (yellow card) 55'	Summary	Suzuki 7' (Vallys); Omoijuanfo 11' (Vallys); Kvistgaarden 77' (Bundgaard); Bischoff (yellow card) 88'	Stadium: Nature Energy Park; Attendance: 14,232; Referee: Sandi Putros

3 March 2024 20	Brøndby	1–1	Vejle	Brøndbyvester
16:00 CET	Wass 88' (pen.), (yellow card) 89'	Summary	Albentosa (yellow card) 61'; Kolinger (yellow card) 70'; Provstgaard 83'; Gundelund (yellow card) 87'; Trott (yellow card) 89'	Stadium: Brøndby Stadium; Attendance: 23,106; Referee: Morten Krogh

10 March 2024 21	Viborg	1–2	Brøndby	Viborg
18:00 CET	Mbom (yellow card) 38'; Ementa 90' (Søndergaard)	Summary	Kvistgaarden 34'; Greve (yellow card) 51'; Radošević (yellow card) 77'; Vanlerberghe (yellow card) 88'; Omoijuanfo 90+3' (Nartey), (yellow card) 90+4'	Stadium: Energi Viborg Arena; Attendance: 7,876; Referee: Mikkel Redder

17 March 2024 22	Brøndby	4–1	Silkeborg	Brøndbyvester
17:00 CET	Suzuki 33' (Wass), 58' (Vallys), 71' (Divković); Vanlerberghe 41' (Vallys)	Summary	Mattsson (yellow card) 37'; Adamsen 54' (Þórðarson); Musonda (yellow card) 39'	Stadium: Brøndby Stadium; Attendance: 22,538; Referee: Jakob Sundberg

==== Championship round ====
1 April 2024 23	Copenhagen	1–2	Brøndby	Copenhagen
14:00 CEST	Ankersen 42' (Lerager); Achouri (yellow card) 80'	Report	Omoijuanfo (yellow card) 51'; Kvistgaarden 69' (Suzuki); Klaiber 90+3' (Rasmussen)	Stadium: Parken; Attendance: 34,017; Referee: Sandi Putros

8 April 2024 24	Brøndby	1–1	Silkeborg	Brøndbyvester
19:00 CEST	Omoijuanfo 55' (Suzuki); Lauritsen (yellow card) 83'	Summary	Lind (yellow card) 57'; Sonne 80' (Adamsen)	Stadium: Brøndby Stadium; Attendance: 18,156; Referee: Jakob Kehlet

14 April 2024 25	AGF	2–2	Brøndby	Aarhus
16:00 CEST	Knudsen 8' (Serra); Mortensen 90+2' (Links)	Summary	Wass 5' (Suzuki); Klaiber 55' (Suzuki); Lauritsen (yellow card) 74'	Stadium: Ceres Park; Attendance: 13,266; Referee: Mads Kristoffersen

21 April 2024 26	Brøndby	2–1	Midtjylland	Brøndbyvester
18:00 CEST	Suzuki 10' (Vallys), 36'; Omoijuanfo (yellow card) 23'; Wass (yellow card) 79'; Rasmussen (yellow card) 85'	Summary	Osorio (yellow card) 6'; Djú (yellow card) 52'; Bech 56' (Sørensen)	Stadium: Brøndby Stadium; Attendance: 24,386; Referee: Sandi Putros

28 April 2024 27	Nordsjælland	1–1	Brøndby	Farum
16:00 CEST	Nagalo (yellow card) 74'; Antman	Summary	Suzuki 45+2' (Bundgaard); Klaiber (yellow card) 83'; Tshiembe (yellow card) 84'	Stadium: Right to Dream Park; Attendance: 8,780; Referee: Morten Krogh

5 May 2024 28	Midtjylland	3–2	Brøndby	Herning
18:00 CEST	Dalsgaard 9' (yellow card) 21'; Osorio 22'; Ingason (yellow card) 45+2'; Djú 74' (Ingason)	Summary	Vallys 12' (Suzuki) (yellow card) 45+4'; Vanlerberghe (yellow card) 28'; Omoijuanfo 31' (Klaiber)	Stadium: MCH Arena; Attendance: 11,861; Referee: Jakob A. Sundberg

12 May 2024 29	Brøndby	1–3	Copenhagen	Brøndbyvester
16:00 CEST	Vallys 31'; Tshiembe (red card) 90+9'	Summary	Diks 39' (Óskarsson) (yellow card) 83', (goal) 90+12' (pen.); Achouri (yellow card) 45+5'; Elyounoussi 54' (Mattsson); Jelert (yellow card) 76'; Larsson (yellow card) 72'	Stadium: Brøndby Stadium; Attendance: 26,267; Referee: Jakob Kehlet

20 May 2024 30	Brøndby	1–0	Nordsjælland	Brøndbyvester
18:00 CEST	Suzuki 27' (Vallys), (yellow card) 87'; Vallys (yellow card) 36'; Vanlerberghe (yellow card) 39'; Wass (yellow card) 90+6'	Summary	Schjelderup (yellow card) 39'; Osman (yellow card) 72'	Stadium: Brøndby Stadium; Attendance: 22,541; Referee: Peter Kjærsgaard-Andersen

20 May 2024 31	Silkeborg	0–2	Brøndby	Silkeborg
16:00 CEST	Felix (yellow card) 89'	Summary	Vallys 18'; Bundgaard 21' (Suzuki)	Stadium: JYSK Park; Attendance: 8,295; Referee: Jacob Karlsen

26 May 2024 32	Brøndby	2–3	AGF	Brøndbyvester
17:00 CEST	Lauritsen 17' (Wass); Sebulonsen 64'	Summary	Lauritsen 41' (o.g.); Poulsen (yellow card) 45+2'; Bech 59', (yellow card) 62'; Mortensen 78' (Andersen); Beijmo (yellow card) 90+4'	Stadium: Brøndby Stadium; Attendance: 27,168; Referee: Morten Krogh

=== Danish Cup ===
27 September 2023 Third round	HIK	0–3	Brøndby	Brøndbyvester
18:00 CEST		Report	Suzuki 19'; Schwartau 21'; Ogura 63' (o.g.)	Stadium: Brøndby Stadium; Attendance: 7,802; Referee: Jørgen Daugbjerg Burchardt

2 November 2023 Fourth round	Randers	0–1	Brøndby	Randers
20:00 CET	Björkengren (yellow card) 90+4'	Report	Suzuki 20'; Radošević (yellow card) 75'; Omoijuanfo (yellow card) 80'; Evjen (yellow card) 90'	Stadium: Cepheus Park Randers; Attendance: 4,286; Referee: Jørgen Daugbjerg Burchardt

7 December 2023 Fifth round First leg	AGF	2–0	Brøndby	Aarhus
18:00 CET	Serra 42' (Mølgaard); Poulsen (yellow card) 45+4'; Tingager 66' (Links)	Report	Wass (yellow card) 55'	Stadium: Ceres Park; Attendance: 9,969; Referee: Peter Kjærsgaard-Andersen

10 December 2023 Fifth round Second leg	Brøndby	2–1 (2–3 agg.)	AGF	Brøndbyvester
15:30 CET	Suzuki (yellow card) 18'; Beijmo 25' (o.g.); Kvistgaarden 43' (Divković); Sebulonsen (yellow card) 48'; Divković (yellow card) 73'	Report	Mortensen 49', (yellow card) 71'	Stadium: Brøndby Stadium; Attendance: 12,949; Referee: Morten Krogh

== Statistics ==
=== Appearances and goals ===
No.	Pos	Nat	Player	Total		Superliga		Danish Cup	
No.	Pos	Nat	Player	Apps	Goals	Apps	Goals	Apps	Goals
1	GK	(Austria) AUT	Patrick Pentz	30	0	27	0	3	0
2	DF	(Norway) NOR	Sebastian Sebulonsen	16	1	6+8	1	1+1	0
3	DF	(Norway) NOR	Henrik Heggheim	13	0	10+3	0	0	0
4	DF	(Denmark) DEN	Jacob Rasmussen	33	1	29	1	4	0
5	DF	(Denmark) DEN	Rasmus Lauritsen	21	1	16+3	1	1+1	0
7	FW	(Denmark) DEN	Nicolai Vallys	34	13	31	13	3	0
8	MF	(Denmark) DEN	Mathias Greve	26	1	17+7	1	2	0
9	FW	(Norway) NOR	Ohi Omoijuanfo	34	10	25+6	10	1+2	0
10	MF	(Denmark) DEN	Daniel Wass	34	3	31	3	2+1	0
11	MF	(Denmark) DEN	Filip Bundgaard	15	1	4+11	1	0	0
14	DF	(Denmark) DEN	Kevin Mensah	21	0	7+11	0	2+1	0
16	GK	(Denmark) DEN	Thomas Mikkelsen	6	0	5	0	1	0
18	DF	(Denmark) DEN	Kevin Tshiembe	19	0	11+5	0	3	0
19	MF	(Denmark) DEN	Bertram Kvist	0	0	0	0	0	0
20	MF	(Poland) POL	Mateusz Kowalczyk	3	0	0+1	0	0+2	0
22	MF	(Croatia) CRO	Josip Radošević	35	2	15+16	2	3+1	0
23	MF	(United States) USA	Christian Cappis	1	0	0+1	0	0	0
24	DF	(Croatia) CRO	Marko Divković	32	2	25+3	2	4	0
28	FW	(Japan) JPN	Yuito Suzuki	30	11	18+8	9	3+1	2
30	DF	(Belgium) BEL	Jordi Vanlerberghe	12	1	11+1	1	0	0
31	DF	(Suriname) SUR	Sean Klaiber	26	4	22+1	4	2+1	0
32	DF	(Denmark) DEN	Frederik Alves	19	1	16	1	3	0
35	MF	(Denmark) DEN	Noah Nartey	9	0	2+7	0	0	0
36	FW	(Denmark) DEN	Mathias Kvistgaarden	28	8	18+6	8	3+1	0
37	DF	(Denmark) DEN	Clement Bischoff	5	0	0+4	0	0+1	0
40	GK	(Denmark) DEN	Jonathan Ægidius	0	0	0	0	0	0
41	FW	(Denmark) DEN	Oscar Schwartau	17	1	0+14	0	2+1	1
99	FW	(Ghana) GHA	Emmanuel Yeboah	2	0	0+1	0	0+1	0
Players who left Brøndby during the season:
11	MF	(Norway) NOR	Håkon Evjen	15	1	1+10	1	1+3	0
15	DF	(Paraguay) PAR	Blas Riveros	5	0	5	0	0	0
17	FW	(Denmark) DEN	Yousef Salech	3	0	0+3	0	0	0
25	MF	(New Zealand) NZL	Joe Bell	1	0	0+1	0	0	0
27	FW	(Sweden) SWE	Simon Hedlund	1	0	0+1	0	0	0

=== Goal scorers ===
Place	Position	Nation	Number	Name	Superliga	Danish Cup	Total
1	FW	(Denmark)	7	Nicolai Vallys	13	0	13
2	FW	(Japan)	28	Yuito Suzuki	9	2	11
3	FW	(Norway)	9	Ohi Omoijuanfo	10	0	10
4	FW	(Denmark)	36	Mathias Kvistgaarden	8	1	9
5	DF	(Suriname)	31	Sean Klaiber	4	0	4
6	MF	(Denmark)	10	Daniel Wass	3	0	3
7	MF	(Croatia)	22	Josip Radošević	2	0	2
7	DF	(Croatia)	24	Marko Divković	2	0	2
9	DF	(Norway)	2	Sebastian Sebulonsen	1	0	1
9	DF	(Denmark)	4	Jacob Rasmussen	1	0	1
9	DF	(Denmark)	5	Rasmus Lauritsen	1	0	1
9	MF	(Denmark)	8	Mathias Greve	1	0	1
9	MF	(Norway)	11	Håkon Evjen	1	0	1
9	MF	(Denmark)	11	Filip Bundgaard	1	0	1
9	DF	(Belgium)	30	Jordi Vanlerberghe	1	0	1
9	DF	(Denmark)	32	Frederik Alves	1	0	1
9	FW	(Denmark)	41	Oscar Schwartau	0	1	1
Total					59	4	63

=== Assists ===
Place	Position	Nation	Number	Name	Superliga	Danish Cup	Total
1	FW	(Denmark)	7	Nicolai Vallys	8	0	8
2	FW	(Japan)	28	Yuito Suzuki	7	0	7
3	MF	(Denmark)	10	Daniel Wass	6	0	6
3	DF	(Croatia)	24	Marko Divković	5	1	6
5	FW	(Denmark)	36	Mathias Kvistgaarden	5	0	5
5	FW	(Denmark)	36	Mathias Kvistgaarden	5	0	5
5	DF	(Denmark)	4	Jacob Rasmussen	2	0	2
5	MF	(Denmark)	8	Mathias Greve	2	0	2
5	MF	(Norway)	11	Håkon Evjen	2	0	2
5	MF	(Denmark)	11	Filip Bundgaard	2	0	2
9	DF	(Denmark)	14	Kevin Mensah	1	0	1
9	MF	(Croatia)	22	Josip Radošević	1	0	1
9	MF	(Denmark)	35	Noah Nartey	1	0	1
9	DF	(Suriname)	31	Sean Klaiber	1	0	1
9	FW	(Norway)	9	Ohi Omoijuanfo	1	0	1
9	DF	(Denmark)	18	Kevin Tshiembe	1	0	1
Total					46	1	47

=== Clean sheets ===
Place	Position	Nation	Number	Name	Superliga	Danish Cup	Total
1	GK	(Austria)	1	Patrick Pentz	10	1	11
2	GK	(Denmark)	16	Thomas Mikkelsen	2	1	3
Total					12	2	14

=== Disciplinary record ===
Number	Position	Nation	Name	Superliga			Danish Cup			Total		
Number	Position	Nation	Name	Yellow card	(yellow card) (yellow-red card)	Red card	Yellow card	(yellow card) (yellow-red card)	Red card	Yellow card	(yellow card) (yellow-red card)	Red card
1	GK	(Austria)	Patrick Pentz	2	0	0	0	0	0	2	0	0
2	DF	(Norway)	Sebastian Sebulonsen	0	0	0	1	0	0	1	0	0
3	DF	(Norway)	Henrik Heggheim	3	0	1	0	0	0	3	0	1
4	DF	(Denmark)	Jacob Rasmussen	5	0	0	0	0	0	5	0	0
5	DF	(Denmark)	Rasmus Lauritsen	3	0	0	0	0	0	3	0	0
7	FW	(Denmark)	Nicolai Vallys	3	0	0	0	0	0	3	0	0
8	MF	(Denmark)	Mathias Greve	3	0	0	0	0	0	3	0	0
9	FW	(Denmark)	Ohi Omoijuanfo	4	0	0	1	0	0	5	0	0
10	MF	(Denmark)	Daniel Wass	7	0	0	1	0	0	8	0	0
18	DF	(Denmark)	Kevin Tshiembe	2	0	2	0	0	0	2	0	2
22	MF	(Croatia)	Josip Radošević	3	0	0	1	0	0	4	0	0
24	DF	(Croatia)	Marko Divković	2	0	0	1	0	0	3	0	0
28	FW	(Japan)	Yuito Suzuki	0	0	0	1	0	0	1	0	0
30	DF	(Belgium)	Jordi Vanlerberghe	3	0	0	0	0	0	3	0	0
31	DF	(Suriname)	Sean Klaiber	1	0	0	0	0	0	1	0	0
32	DF	(Denmark)	Frederik Alves	6	0	0	0	0	0	6	0	0
36	FW	(Denmark)	Mathias Kvistgaarden	4	0	0	0	0	0	4	0	0
37	DF	(Denmark)	Clement Bischoff	1	0	0	0	0	0	1	0	0
41	FW	(Denmark)	Oscar Schwartau	1	0	0	0	0	0	1	0	0
Players who left Brøndby during the season:
11	MF	(Norway)	Håkon Evjen	0	0	0	1	0	0	1	0	0
15	DF	(Paraguay)	Blas Riveros	1	0	0	0	0	0	1	0	0
Total				56	0	3	7	0	0	66	0	3

== Home attendance ==
Competition	Total	Games	Average
Superliga	355,045	16	22,190
Pokalen	12,949	1	12,949
Total	367,994	17	21,647
