= Clement Bischoff =

Danish footballer (born 2005)

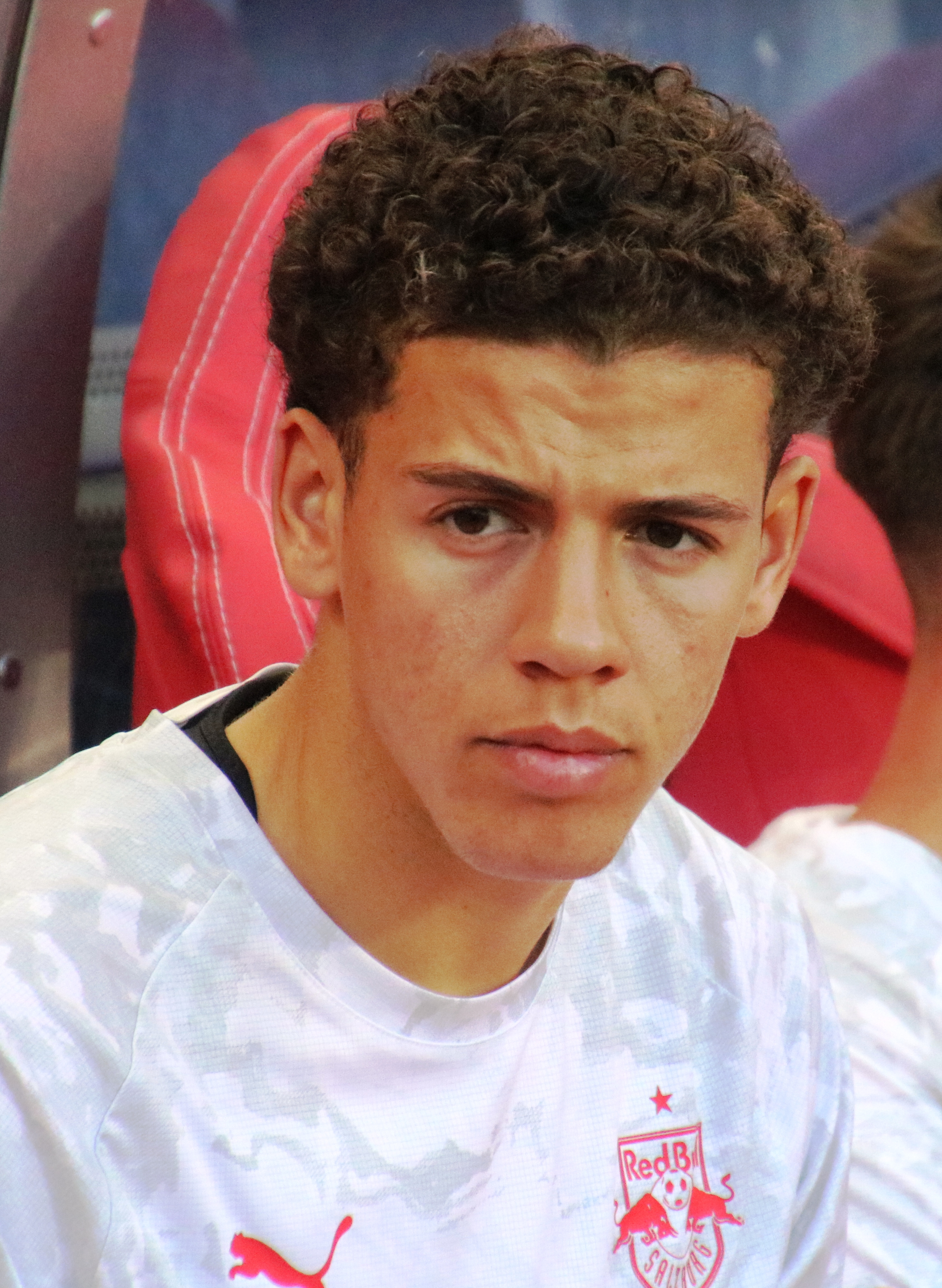
- Bischoff in 2025

Personal information
- Full name: Clement Mutahi Bischoff
- Date of birth: 16 December 2005 (age 20)
- Place of birth: Copenhagen, Denmark
- Height: 1.82 m (6 ft 0 in)
- Positions: Left winger; left midfielder

Team information
- Current team: NEC (on loan from Red Bull Salzburg)
- Number: 99

Youth career
- Sundby Boldklub
- AC Academy
- –2022: Fremad Amager
- 2022–2023: Brøndby

Senior career*
Years	Team	Apps	(Gls)
2023–2025	Brøndby	40	(3)
2025–	Red Bull Salzburg	15	(1)
2026–	→ NEC (loan)	8	(1)

International career^{‡}
2023–2024	Denmark U19	9	(5)
2024	Denmark U20	2	(1)
2024–	Denmark U21	14	(5)
- * Club domestic league appearances and goals as of 25 October 2026 ‡ National team caps and goals as of 31 March 2026

Clement Mutahi Bischoff (born 16 December 2005) is a Danish professional footballer who plays as a left winger and left midfielder for Eredivisie club NEC, on loan from the Austrian Bundesliga club Red Bull Salzburg.

== Club career ==
=== Brøndby ===
Bischoff started playing football for Amager-based clubs Sundby Boldklub and AC Academy (shared academy of B1908 and Fremad Amager) before joining Brøndby's academy in January 2022. He signed a two-year contract and became part of the under-17 team. After impressing early on, he extended his contract until 2024 in May 2022.

Prior to the 2023–24 season, Bischoff joined Brøndby's first team in pre-season training camp alongside Ludwig Vraa and Noah Nartey. On 27 September 2023, Bischoff made his professional debut, replacing Marko Divković at left-back in the 68th minute of a 3–0 Danish Cup win over HIK. On 9 November 2023, he extended his contract with the club until 2026. His Danish Superliga debut followed after the winter break, coming off the bench in the 85th minute for Sebastian Sebulonsen in a 3–0 away victory against OB on 25 February 2024.

On 21 July 2024, Bischoff scored his first professional goal in Brøndby's season opener away against Viborg in a 3–3 away draw. This also marked his first start for the club's first team. Four days later, he made his European debut, starting against Kosovan club Llapi in a 6–0 victory at home in the UEFA Conference League second qualifying round. Bischoff became an established starter at left-back under head coach Jesper Sørensen at the start of the season.

=== Red Bull Salzburg ===
On 2 September 2025, Austrian Bundesliga side Red Bull Salzburg announced the signing of Bischoff on a four-year contract. The fee was officially undisclosed, though media outlets reported it to be around €4 million. The move reunited him with former Brøndby captain Jacob Rasmussen, who had joined Salzburg earlier in the transfer window.

After starting the season with regular appearances as a substitute and occasional starts, he was suspended from the first team in March 2026 until the end of the 2025–26 season following a disciplinary incident in training involving manager Daniel Beichler.

==== Loan to NEC ====
On 22 July 2026, Bischoff moved on loan to Eredivisie club NEC in the Netherlands, with an option to buy.

== International career ==
Bischoff made his Denmark U19 debut on 7 September 2023, coming on as a substitute for Noah Sahsah in a 3–1 friendly win over Poland U19. In the subsequent match on 10 September, he earned his first start and scored his debut goal for Denmark, despite their 2–1 loss to Norway U19.

== Personal life ==
He is of Kenyan descent through his paternal grandfather and his uncle is former Brøndby and Manchester City player Mikkel Bischoff. His cousin is the Brøndby IF women's player Mila Bischoff.

== Career statistics ==
As of match played 25 October 2026

Appearances and goals by club, season and competition
Club	Season	League			National cup (Note: Includes Danish Cup, Austrian Cup)		Europe		Other		Total	
Club	Season	Division	Apps	Goals	Apps	Goals	Apps	Goals	Apps	Goals	Apps	Goals
Brøndby	2023–24	Danish Superliga	4	0	1	0	—		—		5	0
Brøndby	2024–25	Danish Superliga	29	2	6	0	4 (Note: Appearances in UEFA Conference League)	0	—		39	2
Brøndby	2025–26	Danish Superliga	7	1	—		4	0	—		11	1
Brøndby	Total		40	3	7	0	8	0	—		55	3
Red Bull Salzburg	2025–26	Austrian Bundesliga	15	1	3	1	6 (Note: Appearances in UEFA Europa League)	0	—		24	2
NEC (loan)	2026–27	Eredivisie	8	1	0	0	7 (Note: Four appearances and one goal in UEFA Champions League, three appearances and one goal in UEFA Europa League)	2	—		15	3
Career total			63	5	10	1	21	2	0	0	94	8

== Honours ==
Individual

- Danish Superliga Young Player of the Month: October 2024, July 2025
