= Rasmus Lauritsen =

Danish footballer (born 1996)

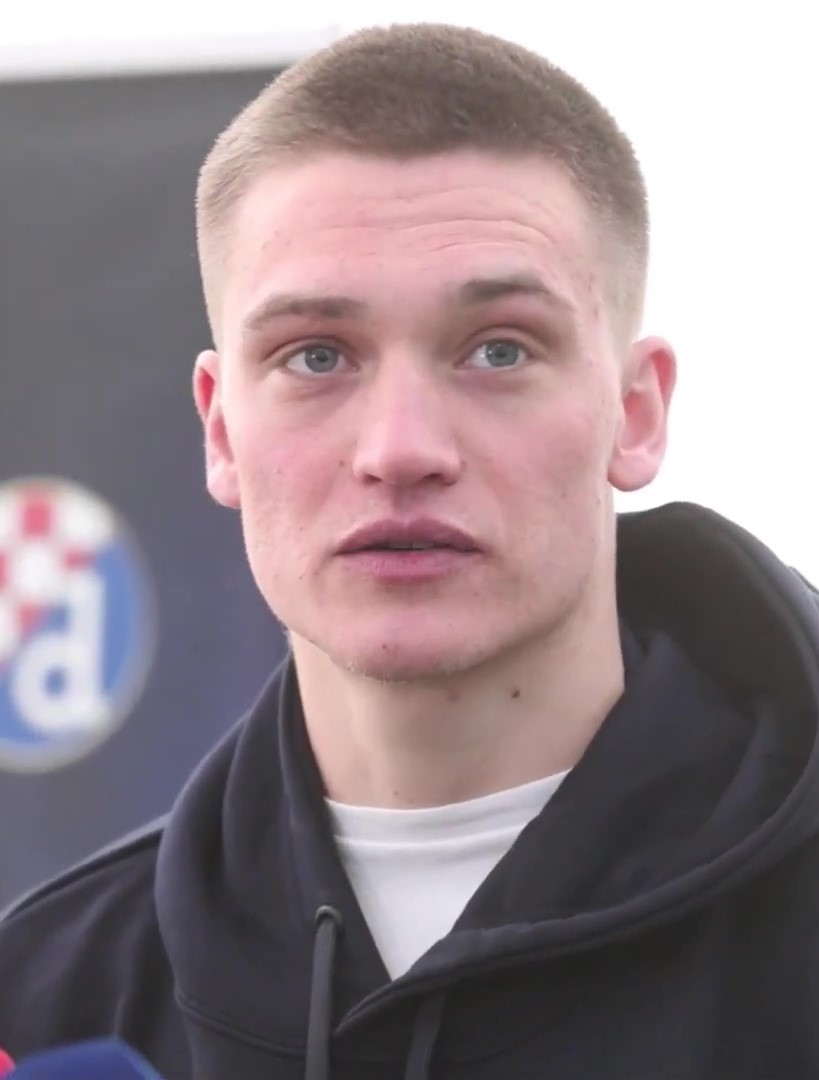
- Lauritsen with Dinamo Zagreb in 2021

Personal information
- Full name: Rasmus Steensbæk Lauritsen
- Date of birth: 27 February 1996 (age 30)
- Place of birth: Brande, Denmark
- Height: 1.86 m (6 ft 1 in)
- Position: Centre-back

Team information
- Current team: Iraklis
- Number: 44

Youth career
- 2000–: Brande IF
- –2011: Herning Fremad
- 2011–2015: Midtjylland

Senior career*
Years	Team	Apps	(Gls)
2015–2016	Midtjylland	1	(0)
2016–2017	Skive	31	(3)
2017–2019	Vejle	48	(8)
2019–2020	IFK Norrköping	48	(11)
2020–2023	Dinamo Zagreb	49	(3)
2023–2026	Brøndby	53	(1)
2026–	Iraklis	0	(0)
- * Club domestic league appearances and goals as of 19 May 2026

Rasmus Steensbæk Lauritsen (born 27 February 1996) is a Danish professional footballer who plays as a centre-back for Super League Greece club Iraklis.

A product of the Midtjylland academy, Lauritsen built his reputation in the lower reaches of Danish football before emerging as one of the most dangerous goalscoring defenders in Scandinavia with Skive, Vejle and IFK Norrköping. His form in Sweden earned him a move to Dinamo Zagreb in 2020. There he won three Croatian league titles, a Croatian Cup and a Super Cup, and played in both the UEFA Champions League and the UEFA Europa League, famously as part of the side that knocked out Tottenham Hotspur in 2021. He returned to Denmark with Brøndby in 2023, but injuries and changes of head coach left him on the fringes for much of his time there, and in 2026 he moved to Greece to join Iraklis.

== Career ==
=== Early years ===
Born in Brande, Lauritsen began playing football at the age of four. He came through the youth ranks of local club Brande IF and Herning Fremad before joining the Midtjylland academy in the summer of 2011. He was handed his senior debut at 19 on 8 November 2015, coming off the bench in a 5–1 Superliga home win over Esbjerg. It proved to be his only first-team appearance for the club.

=== Skive and Vejle ===
Two months after his debut, Lauritsen dropped down to the Danish 1st Division and signed a two-year contract with Skive. It was there that he scored his first senior goal, in a 3–2 win over Næstved on 1 December 2016.

In June 2017, Lauritsen moved on to divisional rivals Vejle on a two-year deal, which the club extended by a further year only three months later. He scored six goals from centre-back in the 2017–18 season as Vejle won the league and returned to the Superliga after nine years away. He carried that threat into the top flight, scoring his first Superliga goal in a 1–1 draw with fellow promoted side Vendsyssel in August 2018.

=== IFK Norrköping ===
In February 2019, Lauritsen made his first move abroad, joining Swedish club IFK Norrköping on a three-year contract. Over the 2019 and 2020 seasons he developed into one of the most dangerous goalscoring centre-backs in Allsvenskan. By the summer of 2020, one of Turkey's leading clubs was reported to be monitoring him.

=== Dinamo Zagreb ===
In the end it was Croatian champions Dinamo Zagreb who signed Lauritsen, on 2 October 2020. His debut against Varaždin two days later was an unhappy one, as his error led to a goal. He soon became a steadying presence, however, and Dinamo did not concede a single goal in the five Europa League group matches he played.

The defining night of his first season came on 18 March 2021 in the Europa League round of 16. Trailing Tottenham Hotspur 2–0 from the first leg in London, Dinamo won the return match in Zagreb 3–0 after extra time, with Lauritsen in the starting line-up. The result carried the club into the quarter-finals of the competition for the first time.

At home, Lauritsen won three league titles, the Croatian Cup and the Croatian Super Cup during his time in Zagreb. He started the Super Cup on 9 July 2022, which Dinamo won on penalties against Hajduk Split. In all, he made 25 European appearances for the club across the Champions League and the Europa League.

=== Brøndby ===
Lauritsen returned to Denmark in January 2023, signing a four-and-a-half-year contract with Brøndby. He arrived carrying an injury and short of fitness, and had to wait until 16 April for his first start. He marked it with a clean sheet in a 1–0 win over AGF.

Another injury in August 2023 halted his progress. In his absence, head coach Jesper Sørensen settled on a central defence of Jacob Rasmussen, Henrik Heggheim and Frederik Alves, leaving Lauritsen on the bench. He did, however, score his first goal for the club against AGF in May 2024.

His finest spell in a Brøndby shirt came in April 2025. With Rasmussen and Alves both injured, head coach Frederik Birk handed Lauritsen only his second league start of the season against AGF on 7 April. His display in a 2–1 win prompted Birk, who rarely praised individual players, to single him out. A week later he anchored a three-man defence as Brøndby won the derby against Copenhagen 2–1 at Parken.

The revival proved short-lived. Birk was dismissed in September 2025 and replaced by Steve Cooper, under whom Lauritsen fell out of the side. By January 2026, after eight Superliga appearances that season, the club had given him permission to look elsewhere. Brøndby held loan talks with Swedish club AIK in February, but they came to nothing, and he spent almost all of 2026 outside the squad. He left the club having made 66 appearances in all competitions.

=== Iraklis ===
On 27 August 2026, Lauritsen joined Iraklis, newly promoted to Super League Greece, on a permanent transfer. Brøndby let him go without a transfer fee. Explaining the move, Lauritsen said he wanted to play more football and to have an important role on the pitch again. Iraklis head coach Walter Mazzarri had been asking for reinforcements at centre-back.

== Personal life ==
Lauritsen has a twin brother, Frederik, who is also a footballer.

== Career statistics ==
As of match played 17 May 2026

Appearances and goals by club, season and competition
Club	Season	League			Cup (Note: Includes Danish Cup, Svenska Cupen and Croatian Cup)		Europe		Other		Total	
Club	Season	Division	Apps	Goals	Apps	Goals	Apps	Goals	Apps	Goals	Apps	Goals
Midtjylland	2015–16	Danish Superliga	1	0	0	0	0	0	—		1	0
Skive	2015–16	Danish 1st Division	11	0	1	0	—		—		12	0
Skive	2016–17	Danish 1st Division	20	3	0	0	—		—		20	3
Skive	Total		31	3	1	0	—		—		32	3
Vejle	2017–18	Danish 1st Division	30	6	0	0	—		—		30	6
Vejle	2018–19	Danish Superliga	18	2	0	0	—		—		18	2
Vejle	Total		48	8	0	0	—		—		48	8
IFK Norrköping	2019	Allsvenskan	26	5	0	0	6 (Note: Appearances in the UEFA Europa League)	1	—		32	6
IFK Norrköping	2020	Allsvenskan	22	6	3	0	—		—		25	6
IFK Norrköping	Total		48	11	3	0	6	1	—		57	12
Dinamo Zagreb	2020–21	Prva HNL	24	1	3	0	11	0	—		38	1
Dinamo Zagreb	2021–22	Prva HNL	16	1	2	0	10 (Note: Six appearances in UEFA Champions League, four appearances in UEFA Europa League)	0	—		28	1
Dinamo Zagreb	2022–23	Prva HNL	9	1	1	0	4 (Note: Appearances in the UEFA Champions League)	0	1 (Note: Appearance in Croatian Football Super Cup)	0	15	1
Dinamo Zagreb	Total		49	3	6	0	25	0	1	0	81	3
Brøndby	2022–23	Danish Superliga	9	0	—		—		—		9	0
Brøndby	2023–24	Danish Superliga	19	1	2	0	—		—		21	1
Brøndby	2024–25	Danish Superliga	16	0	3	0	4 (Note: Appearances in the UEFA Conference League)	0	—		23	0
Brøndby	2025–26	Danish Superliga	9	0	0	0	4	0	0	0	13	0
Brøndby	Total		53	1	5	0	8	0	0	0	66	1
Iraklis	2026–27	Super League Greece	0	0	0	0	—		—		0	0
Career total			230	26	15	0	39	1	1	0	285	27

== Honours ==
Vejle

- Danish 1st Division: 2017–18

Midtjylland

- Danish Superliga: 2014–15

Dinamo Zagreb

- Prva HNL: 2020–21, 2021–22
- Croatian Cup: 2020–21
- Croatian Super Cup: 2022
