= 2024–25 Brøndby IF season =

59th season in existence of Brøndby IF

Brøndby IF
2024–25 season
- Owner: Global Football Holdings
- Chairman: Jan Bech Andersen
- Head coach: Jesper Sørensen (until 11 December); Frederik Birk (from 8 January)
- Stadium: Brøndby Stadium
- Danish Superliga: 3rd
- Danish Cup: Semi-finals
- UEFA Conference League: Third qualifying round
- Top goalscorer: League: Mathias Kvistgaarden (17); All: Mathias Kvistgaarden (23)
- Highest home attendance: 26,885 vs Copenhagen, 4 May 2025, Danish Superliga
- Lowest home attendance: 11,575 vs Nordsjælland, 10 November 2024, Danish Superliga
- Average home league attendance: 21,659
- All statistics correct as of 25 July 2025.

The 2024–25 Brøndby IF season was Brøndbyernes Idrætsforening's 44th consecutive season in the top division of Danish football, their 35th consecutive season in the Danish Superliga, and their 59th overall as a football club. In addition to competing in the Superliga, Brøndby participated in the Danish Cup.

Head coach Jesper Sørensen began the season in charge for the third consecutive year but was dismissed in December 2024 due to disappointing results. Assistant coach Frederik Birk took over on an interim basis, and on 8 January 2025, the club confirmed his permanent appointment as head coach.

The season covered the period from 1 July 2024 to 30 June 2025. Brøndby concluded the league campaign in third place, earning qualification to the second round second qualifying round of the 2025–26 UEFA Europa Conference League. Their run in the Danish Cup ended at the semi-final stage, marking another season without domestic silverware.

== Background and pre-season ==
Brøndby IF entered the 2024–25 season following a third-place finish in the 2023–24 Danish Superliga, with the stated aim of challenging for the league title and qualification for UEFA Champions League football. Significant changes occurred off the pitch prior to the season; notably, sporting director Carsten V. Jensen resigned on 5 October 2024, ending a five-year tenure at the club.

In terms of player recruitment, the primary signing was Austrian goalkeeper Patrick Pentz, who completed a permanent transfer from Bayer Leverkusen after a successful loan period. Pentz, who signed a four-year contract, had been named the club's Player of the Year for 2024. Head coach Jesper Sørensen retained his preferred attacking 4–3–3 formation, built around forward Mathias Kvistgaarden. Additionally, Stijn Spierings was signed on a free, and Mileta Rajović joined on loan to strengthen the squad depth.

Pre-season preparations included a training camp in Austria, where Brøndby recorded mixed results, notably defeating Sparta Prague 5–2 but losing 4–0 to Dynamo Kyiv, highlighting inconsistency that would persist into the competitive season.

== Transfers ==
=== In ===
Pos.	Player	Transferred from	Fee	Date	Source
GK	(Austria) Patrick Pentz	(Germany) Bayer Leverkusen	€2,550,000	1 July 2024	
MF	(Netherlands) Stijn Spierings	(France) Lens	Free	28 August 2024	
FW	(Denmark) Mileta Rajović	(England) Watford	Loan	2 September 2024	
GK	(United States) Gavin Beavers	(United States) Real Salt Lake	Undisclosed	22 January 2025	
MF	(Bosnia and Herzegovina) Benjamin Tahirović	(Netherlands) Ajax	€2,750,000	3 February 2025	

=== Out ===
Pos.	Player	Transferred to	Fee	Date	Source
MF	(Poland) Mateusz Kowalczyk	(Poland) GKS Katowice	Loan	17 July 2024	
MF	(United States) Christian Cappis	(Norway) Viking	€350,000	13 August 2024	
MF	(Denmark) Bertram Kvist	(Denmark) Kolding IF	Loan	20 August 2024	
FW	(Denmark) Oscar Schwartau	(England) Norwich City	€2,500,000	24 August 2024	
GK	(Denmark) Jonathan Ægidius	(Denmark) Kolding IF	Loan	28 August 2024	
MF	(Denmark) Mathias Greve	(Denmark) Randers	€400,000	30 August 2024	
DF	(Norway) Henrik Heggheim	(Norway) Viking	€290,000	30 August 2024	
FW	(Ghana) Emmanuel Yeboah	(Denmark) Vejle	Loan	2 September 2024	
DF	(Denmark) Kevin Mensah	Unattached	Free	31 December 2024	
FW	(Norway) Ohi Omoijuanfo	(China) Changchun Yatai	Undisclosed	11 January 2025	
MF	(Croatia) Josip Radošević	(Croatia) NK Istra	€50,000	30 January 2025	
FW	(Sweden) Carl Björk	(Denmark) B.93	Loan	3 February 2025	
GK	(Denmark) Jonathan Ægidius	(Denmark) Lyngby	Undisclosed	3 February 2025	
DF	(United States) Justin Che	(Belgium) Patro Eisden	Loan	3 February 2025	
MF	(Denmark) Bertram Kvist	(Croatia) Esbjerg fB	Free	7 February 2025	

== Friendlies ==
=== Pre-season ===
Win	Draw	Loss

Date	Opponents	Venue	Result F–A	Scorers	Attendance
29 June 2024	Vejle	H	0–2		?
10 July 2024	Sparta Prague	H	5–2	Vallys (2) 6', 44', Lauritsen 22', Bundgaard 27', Suzuki 75'	?
13 July 2024	Antwerp	H	0–0		?
14 July 2024	Dynamo Kyiv	H	0–4		?

== Competitions ==
=== Overall record ===
Competition	First match	Last match	Starting round	Record							
Competition	First match	Last match	Starting round	Pld	W	D	L	GF	GA	GD	Win %
Danish Superliga	21 July 2024	25 May 2025	Matchday 1	32	13	12	7	58	46	+12	40.63
Danish Cup	25 September 2024	7 May 2025	Third round	6	3	1	2	14	8	+6	50.00
UEFA Conference League	25 July 2024	15 August 2024	Second qualifying round	4	1	2	1	11	6	+5	25.00
Total				42	17	15	10	83	60	+23	40.48

Last updated: 25 May 2025
Source: Soccerway

=== Superliga ===
==== League table ====
Pos	Team	Pld	W	D	L	GF	GA	GD	Pts	Qualification
4	Randers	22	9	8	5	39	28	+11	35	Qualification for the Championship round
5	Nordsjælland	22	10	5	7	39	36	+3	35	Qualification for the Championship round
6	Brøndby	22	8	9	5	42	32	+10	33	Qualification for the Championship round
7	Silkeborg	22	8	9	5	38	29	+9	33	Qualification for the Relegation round
8	Viborg	22	7	7	8	38	39	−1	28	Qualification for the Relegation round

Source: Danish Football Association (in Danish), Soccerway
Rules for classification: 1) Points; 2) Goal difference; 3) Goals scored; 4) Away goals scored; 5) Play-off (played on neutral ground if determining teams for different rounds); 6) Draw.

Pos	Team	Pld	W	D	L	GF	GA	GD	Pts	
1	Copenhagen (C)	32	18	9	5	60	33	+27	63	Qualification for the UEFA Champions League second qualifying round
2	Midtjylland	32	19	5	8	64	42	+22	62	Qualification for the UEFA Europa League second qualifying round
3	Brøndby	32	13	12	7	58	46	+12	51	Qualification for the UEFA Conference League second qualifying round
4	Randers	32	13	9	10	57	50	+7	48	Qualification for the European play-off match
5	Nordsjælland	32	13	7	12	53	56	−3	46	

Source: Danish Football Association (in Danish), Soccerway
Rules for classification: 1) Points; 2) Goal difference; 3) Goals scored; 4) Away goals scored; 5) Play-off (played on neutral ground if determining teams for different rounds); 6) Draw.
(C) Champions

Pos	Team	Pld	W	D	L	GF	GA	GD	Pts	
1	Silkeborg (O)	32	13	10	9	56	41	+15	49	Qualification for the European play-off match
2	Viborg	32	12	11	9	57	50	+7	47	
3	Sønderjyske	32	10	7	15	47	64	−17	37	
4	Vejle	32	7	7	18	37	64	−27	28	
5	Lyngby (R)	32	5	12	15	26	43	−17	27	Relegation to 1st Division
6	AaB (R)	32	5	9	18	34	67	−33	24	Relegation to 1st Division

Source: Danish Football Association (in Danish), Soccerway
Rules for classification: 1) Points; 2) Goal difference; 3) Goals scored; 4) Away goals scored; 5) Play-off (played on neutral ground if determining teams for different rounds); 6) Draw.
(O) Play-off winners; (R) Relegated

==== Results summary ====
Overall								Home						Away					
Pld	W	D	L	GF	GA	GD	Pts	W	D	L	GF	GA	GD	W	D	L	GF	GA	GD
32	13	12	7	58	46	+12	51	7	6	3	24	18	+6	6	6	4	34	28	+6

Last updated: 25 May 2025.
Source: Worldfootball

=== Matches ===
The 2024–25 Danish Superliga fixtures were released on 7 June 2024.

==== Regular season ====
Win	Draw	Loss

Date	Opponents	Venue	Result F–A	Scorers	Attendance	League position
21 July 2024	Viborg	A	3–3	Bischoff 30', Yeboah (2) 90+2, 90+8	7,658	5th
29 July 2024	Vejle	H	2–1	Kvistgaarden 47', Sebulonsen 52'	22,494	4th
4 August 2024	Lyngby	A	2–0	Kvistgaarden 6', Bischoff 17'	7,839	2nd
11 August 2024	AGF	H	0–1		20,976	6th
18 August 2024	AaB	A	4–0	Kvistgaarden 33', Bundgaard (2) 36', 56', Greve 90'	11,723	5th
25 August 2024	Randers	H	2–2	Divković 72', Kvistgaarden 82'	21,797	4th
1 September 2024	Copenhagen	A	1–3	Kvistgaarden 61'	34,236	5th
15 September 2024	Sønderjyske	H	2–0	Kvistgaarden 3', Suzuki 75'	22,566	4th
22 September 2024	Silkeborg	A	3–3	Suzuki 23', Wass 63', Rajovic 67'	7,239	5th
30 September 2024	Nordsjælland	A	1–4	Suzuki 13'	7,074	5th
6 October 2024	Midtjylland	H	2–0	Rajovic (2) 9', 68'	23,274	6th
21 October 2024	AGF	A	0–1		15,736	6th
27 October 2024	Copenhagen	H	0–0		26,075	6th
3 November 2024	Midtjylland	A	5–1	Kvistgaarden (3) 10', 71', 83', Suzuki (2) 52', 61'	11,358	5th
10 November 2024	Nordsjælland	H	1–1	Kvistgaarden 32'	11,575	6th
24 November 2024	Sønderjyske	A	2–2	Suzuki 39', Rajovic 49'	8,525	7th
29 November 2024	AaB	H	1–0	Nartey 34'	12,061	5th
14 February 2025	Viborg	H	1–0	Kvistgaarden 3', Anyembe 46' (o.g.), Suzuki 64', Rajovic 82' (pen.)	24,067	4th
23 February 2025	Vejle	A	2–2	Suzuki (2) 62', 68'	10,158	5th
3 March 2025	Lyngby	H	1–1	Vanlerberghe 90+3'	21,394	4th
10 March 2025	Randers	A	2–4	Vallys 54', Vanlerberghe 74'	8,624	6th
16 March 2025	Silkeborg	H	2–2	Vallys 26', Alves '77	24,056	6th

==== Championship round ====
Win	Draw	Loss

Date	Opponents	Venue	Result F–A	Scorers	Attendance	League position
30 March 2025	Midtjylland	A	2–0	Kvistgaarden 44', Vallys 57'	11,447	4th
7 April 2025	AGF	H	2–1	Vallys 13', Kvistgaarden 50'	21,151	4th
13 April 2025	Copenhagen	A	2–1	Kvistgaarden 18', Wass 90+2' (pen.)	35,370	3rd
18 April 2025	Nordsjælland	H	0–0		23,986	3rd
21 April 2025	Randers	H	4–3	Kvistgaarden (2) 33', 45+2', Suzuki 59' (pen.), Nartey 90+7'	23,198	3rd
25 April 2025	Randers	A	0–0		9,084	3rd
4 May 2025	Copenhagen	H	0–3		26,885	3rd
11 May 2025	Nordsjælland	A	2–2	Alves 42', Suzuki 69'	7,852	4th
19 May 2025	Midtjylland	H	1–2	Kvistgaarden 63'	20,982	4th
25 May 2025	AGF	A	3–2	Suzuki 9', Nartey 44', Vallys 52'	6,211	3rd

=== Danish Cup ===
25 September 2024 Third round	Vendsyssel FF	0–5	Brøndby	Hjørring
19:30 CEST		Report	Bundgaard 1'; Vallis 8'; Divković 13'; Rajovic 15'; Kvistgaarden 69'	Stadium: Nord Energi Arena

31 October 2024 Fourth round	Brøndby	1–0	FC Midtjylland	Brøndbyvester
20:00 CET	Rajović 18'	Report		Stadium: Brøndby Stadium; Attendance: 16,575

8 December 2024 Quarter-finals; First leg	AGF	1–0	Brøndby	Aarhus
18:30 CET	Beijmo (yellow card) 37'; Links 74'; Arnstad (yellow card) 78'	Report	Rasmussen (yellow card) 36'; Nartey (yellow card) 78'	Stadium: Ceres Park; Attendance: 8,919; Referee: Mads-Kristoffer Kristoffersen

15 December 2024 Quarter-finals; Second leg	Brøndby	4–2 (4–3 agg.)	AGF	Brøndbyvester
19:00 CET	Wass 11' (pen.); Kvistgaarden 30'; Vallys 57'; Nartey 77'; Spierings (yellow card) 83' (red card) 83'	Report	Tingager (yellow card) 10'; Mortensen 80'; Links (yellow card) 83'; Duelund 85'; Madsen (yellow card) 85'; Mortensen (yellow card) 89'	Stadium: Brøndby Stadium; Attendance: 13,096; Referee: Jakob Alexander Sundberg

30 April 2025 Semi-finals; First leg	Brøndby	3–3	Silkeborg IF	Brøndbyvester
18:30 CET	Divković 57'; Suzuki (yellow card) 63'; Kvistgaarden 81', 83'; Nartey (yellow card) 87'	Report	Poulsen 8'; Vanlerberghe 34' (o.g.); Adamsen 45+1'; Klynge (yellow card) 63'; Larsen (yellow card) 68'	Stadium: Brøndby Stadium; Referee: Mikkel Redder

7 May 2025 Semi-finals; Second leg	Silkeborg IF	2–1 (5–4 agg.)	Brøndby	Silkeborg
18:30 CET	McCowatt 16'; Gammelby 66'	Report	Rajovic 47'; Bischoff (yellow card) 51'	Stadium: JYSK Park; Attendance: 8,881; Referee: Jakob Kehlet

=== UEFA Conference League ===
==== Second qualifying round ====
The draw was held on 19 June 2024.

25 July 2024 First leg	Brøndby IF (Denmark)	6–0	(Kosovo) KF Llapi	Brøndby
19:00	Suzuki 16'; Omoijuanfo 20'; Bundgaard 24'; Nartey 40'; Kvistgaarden 88'; Schwartau 90'; Yeboah (yellow card) 74'; Greve (yellow card) 82'	Report	Bytyqi (yellow card) 22'; Emini (yellow card) 44'; Useini (yellow card) 68'	Stadium: Brøndby Stadium; Referee: David Dickinson (Scotland)

1 August 2024 Second leg	KF Llapi (Kosovo)	2–2 (2–8 agg.)	(Denmark) Brøndby IF	Kosovo
17:00		Report

==== Third qualifying round ====
8 August 2023 First leg	Brøndby IF (Denmark)	2–3	(Poland) Legia Warsaw	Brøndby
19:00 CEST	Bundgaard 19'; Kvistgaarden 36'	Report	Pekhart 24'; Luquinhas 70'; Pekhart 86'	Stadium: Brøndby Stadium; Attendance: 19,502; Referee: Martin Dohál

15 August 2024 Second leg	(Poland) Legia Warsaw	1–1 (4–3 agg.)	Brøndby IF (Denmark)	Warsaw, Poland
18:00 CEST	Pankov 48'	Report	Wass 38'	Stadium: Polish Army Stadium; Attendance: 26,823; Referee: Chryssovalántis Theoulí
