= Nicolai Vallys =

Danish footballer (born 1996)

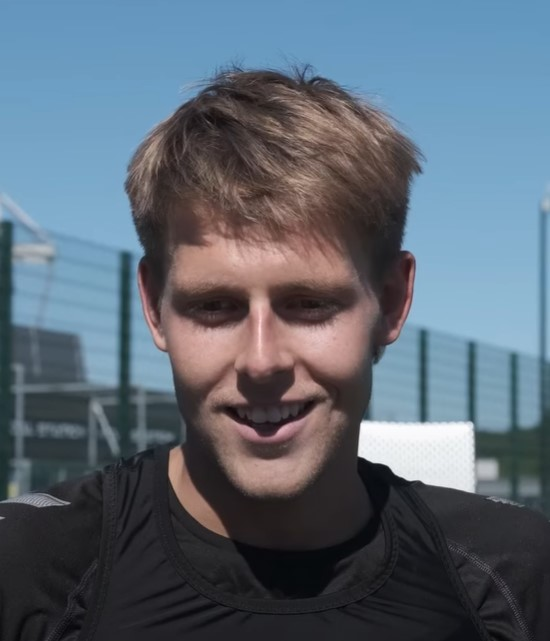
- Vallys in 2022

Personal information
- Full name: Nicolai Frimodt Vallys
- Date of birth: 4 September 1996 (age 30)
- Place of birth: Copenhagen, Denmark
- Height: 1.89 m (6 ft 2 in)
- Positions: Winger; attacking midfielder

Team information
- Current team: FC Tokyo
- Number: 17

Youth career
- –2015: BK Skjold

Senior career*
Years	Team	Apps	(Gls)
2015–2016	BK Skjold		
2016–2018	Skovshoved	50	(26)
2018–2019	Roskilde	29	(7)
2019–2022	Silkeborg	88	(26)
2022–2026	Brøndby	110	(31)
2026–	FC Tokyo	0	(0)

International career^{‡}
2023	Denmark	1	(0)
- * Club domestic league appearances and goals as of 19 May 2026 ‡ National team caps and goals as of 7 September 2023

Nicolai Frimodt Vallys (Danish pronunciation: [ˈvælys]; born 4 September 1996) is a Danish professional footballer who plays as a winger or attacking midfielder for J1 League club FC Tokyo. He gained one cap for the Denmark national team.

== Club career ==
=== Early years ===
Vallys grew up in the Østerbro district of Copenhagen. He started playing football at BK Skjold, where he made his senior debut in 2015 in the sixth-tier Copenhagen Series.

In 2016, he made a move to Skovshoved, a team competing in the fourth-tier Denmark Series. His debut for the club occurred on 10 August 2016, during a Danish Cup first-round match against BSF. In an impressive start, he scored a brace, securing a 4–1 victory for his team. He made his league debut on 10 September, coming on as a substitute in the 77th minute in a 1–1 home draw against B 1908. On 24 September, he scored his first league goal for the club, as Skovshoved lost 3–2 at home to AB Tårnby. As a midfielder, Vallys played a significant role, contributing to the team's promotion to the 2nd Division. Across two seasons at Skovshoved, he showcased his talent, scoring 28 goals in 52 appearances. In June 2018, his skills caught the attention of FC Roskilde, leading to a two-year deal with the club. Transitioning to the second-tier 1st Division, he maintained his impressive performance, scoring seven goals in 29 league appearances.

=== Silkeborg ===
On 1 July 2019, Vallys signed a two-year contract with newly promoted Superliga club Silkeborg, continuing his rapid rise through the Danish divisions. He made his debut for the club, as well as his debut in the highest Danish division, on 14 July 2019 in a 3–0 away loss to Brøndby IF, coming on as a substitute in the 72nd minute for Marc Rochester Sørensen. He finished his first season with Silkeborg with 34 total appearances in which he scored six goals, as the club suffered relegation to the 1st Division.

During the summer of 2020, he suffered an injury while training with a friend, sidelining him for 2–3 months. On 1 September 2020, he signed a contract extension with Silkeborg until December 2023. He returned to the pitch in October 2020, and played a key role as Silkeborg won promotion back to the Superliga in May 2021.

=== Brøndby ===
==== 2022–23: Controversial arrival ====
On 31 August 2022, Vallys joined Brøndby on a four-year contract running until June 2026. Brøndby reportedly paid Silkeborg DKK 22.5 million (€3 million) for the transfer. The move proved controversial among a section of Brøndby's supporters, since Vallys had grown up in Østerbro—the home district of rivals FC Copenhagen, whom he had publicly supported as a youth—and had told Berlingske three months earlier that a future move to FC Copenhagen was not unthinkable. After Vallys received threatening messages, director of sports Carsten V. Jensen, head coach Niels Frederiksen and club captain Andreas Maxsø publicly criticised the fans involved.

Vallys made his competitive debut for Brøndby on 4 September 2022, starting in a 2–0 away win over AC Horsens at CASA Arena. He scored his first goal a week later on his home debut at Brøndby Stadium, putting the team 2–1 ahead in an eventual 2–2 draw with Randers. He scored a hat-trick in a 5–2 win over Horsens in Brøndby's spring opener on 19 February 2023, a performance that helped earn him the Superliga's Player of the Month award for February.

==== 2023–24: Title challenge and individual honours ====
Vallys had perhaps the most prolific season of his career in the 2023–24 season, finishing as Brøndby's top scorer with 13 Superliga goals and eight assists in 31 league appearances as the club mounted a sustained title challenge. After scoring six times in Brøndby's opening eight matches he was named the Superliga's Player of the Month for August and received his first call-up to the Denmark national team in early September. On 2 December 2023 he was named Brøndby Player of the Year for the 2023 calendar year, in which he had registered 13 goals and five assists in 31 appearances in all competitions.

On 10 May 2024, with Brøndby leading the Superliga before the final rounds, Vallys was voted Player of the Year of the 2023–24 Superliga by the players' union, the Spillerforeningen, receiving over 30% of the vote ahead of FC Copenhagen's Elias Achouri and teammate Daniel Wass. Two weeks later, however, Brøndby's title bid collapsed: a 2–3 home defeat to AGF on 26 May 2024 allowed Midtjylland to be crowned champions instead.

==== 2024–25: Injury and unfulfilled transfer interest ====
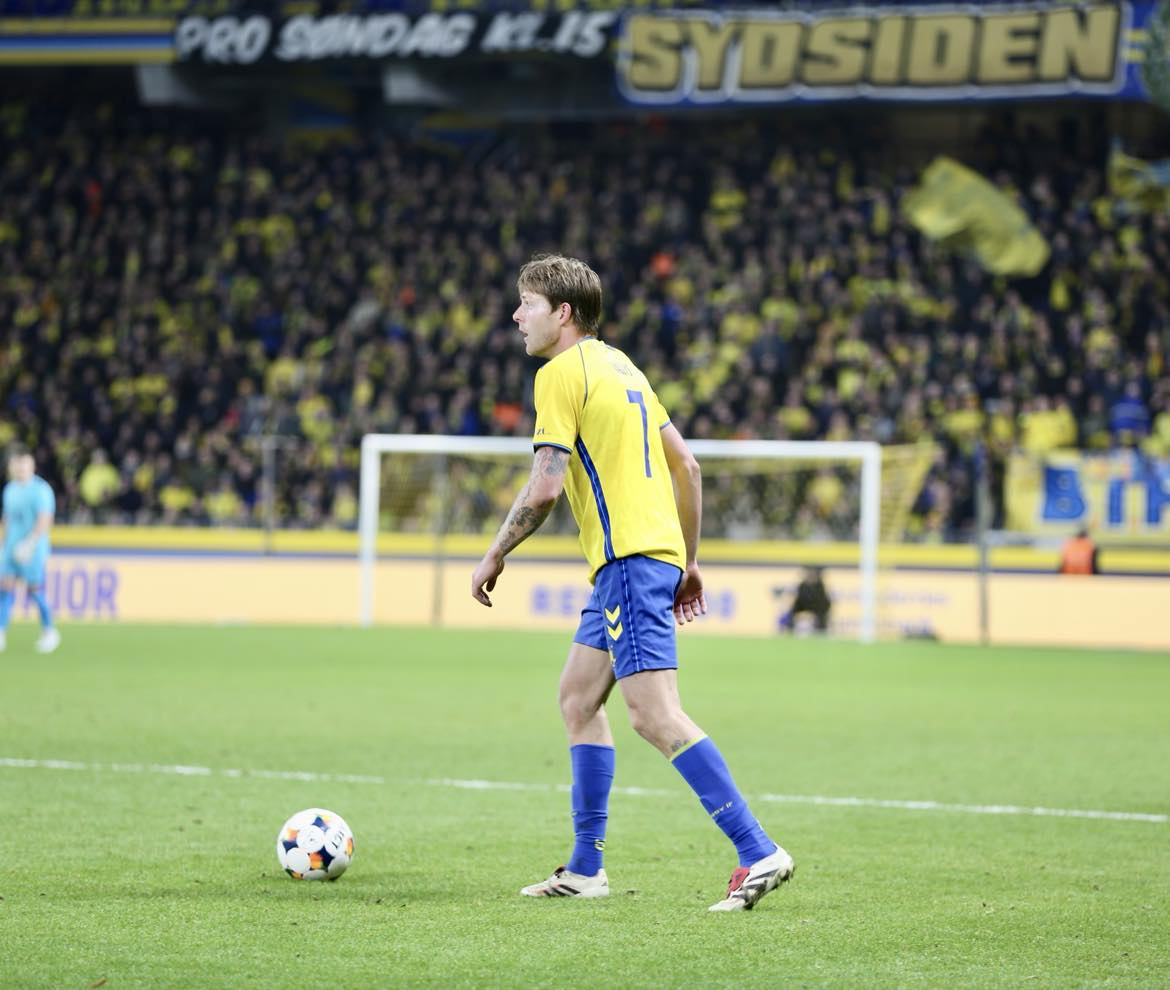
Vallys (pictured in 2025) struggled with injuries in the 2024–25 season

Vallys was linked with a move abroad in the summer of 2024, with Tipsbladet reporting interest from Mainz 05 of the Bundesliga—then managed by fellow Dane Bo Henriksen—and from Ligue 1 club Brest. No transfer materialised before the European windows closed, and Vallys later said publicly that he had set the matter aside to focus on his recovery from injury. Henriksen confirmed Mainz's earlier interest in an August 2025 interview.

The transfer saga was complicated by a knee injury Vallys sustained in the final training session before the season, which Brøndby initially expected to keep him out for four to five weeks. Further shoulder and calf problems disrupted the autumn, and by early December he had not scored in 11 appearances. Head coach Jesper Sørensen was dismissed on 11 December 2024 after a run of poor results, and assistant Frederik Birk was confirmed as permanent head coach on 8 January 2025. Brøndby finished third in the Superliga, securing qualification for the 2025–26 Conference League.

==== 2025–26: Vice-captaincy and contract extension ====
Vallys was appointed vice-captain for the 2025–26 season under new club captain Daniel Wass, a development that Bold framed as the completion of a transition from the divisive figure of his 2022 arrival to a senior leader at the club. With one year remaining on his contract and renewed interest from Mainz, Vallys signed a one-year extension on 10 August 2025 running until the summer of 2027; sporting director Benjamin Schmedes said the length of the deal reflected Vallys's stated long-term ambition to play abroad.

Four days later, Vallys scored twice in a 4–0 second-leg win over Víkingur Reykjavík that completed a 4–3 aggregate Conference League third qualifying round victory after Brøndby had lost the first leg 3–0. The team was subsequently eliminated by Strasbourg in the play-off round, losing 3–2 on aggregate. Birk was dismissed on 9 September 2025 and replaced as head coach by the Welshman Steve Cooper. Cooper's tenure produced uneven results; with the team without a league win since 9 November 2025, Vallys publicly backed the manager in April 2026, acknowledging that the period represented his most prolonged spell of adversity at the club. A 3–2 comeback win at Midtjylland on 17 May 2026, in which Brøndby recovered from 0–2 down inside the final half-hour, secured fourth place in the Superliga and a Europa playoff against rivals Copenhagen for the final UEFA competition place. Copenhagen won the derby 3–1 after extra time at Brøndby Stadium on 21 May; Vallys was withdrawn with a hamstring injury. The defeat eliminated Brøndby from European qualification for the following season. Vallys finished the 2025–26 season as the club's top scorer, netting 10 times in 38 appearances.

Vallys left Brøndby after four seasons, having made 126 appearances and scored 36 goals with 27 assists, and having been named both Danish Superliga Player of the Year and Brøndby's Player of the Year during his time at the club.

=== FC Tokyo ===
On 17 July 2026, Vallys joined J1 League club FC Tokyo on a permanent transfer, where he was given the number 17 shirt. Shortly after his move, he suffered a cruciate ligament injury.

== International career ==
In August 2023, Vallys received his first call-up to the Denmark national team by head coach Kasper Hjulmand, as a substitute for injured Mikkel Damsgaard, for two UEFA Euro 2024 qualifying matches against San Marino and Finland.

== Career statistics ==
As of match played 21 May 2026

Appearances and goals by club, season and competition
Club	Season	League			National cup		League cup		Continental		Other		Total	
Club	Season	Division	Apps	Goals	Apps	Goals	Apps	Goals	Apps	Goals	Apps	Goals	Apps	Goals
Skovshoved	2016–17	Denmark Series	20	14	2	2	—		—		—		22	16
Skovshoved	2017–18	Danish 2nd Division	30	12	0	0	—		—		—		30	12
Skovshoved	Total		50	26	2	2	—		—		—		52	28
Roskilde	2018–19	Danish 1st Division	29	7	0	0	—		—		—		29	7
Silkeborg	2019–20	Danish Superliga	29	6	4	0	—		—		—		33	6
Silkeborg	2020–21	Danish 1st Division	21	8	0	0	—		—		—		21	8
Silkeborg	2021–22	Danish Superliga	32	10	2	1	—		—		—		34	11
Silkeborg	2022–23	Danish Superliga	6	2	0	0	—		2 (Note: Appearances in UEFA Europa League)	0	—		8	2
Silkeborg	Total		88	26	6	1	—		2	0	—		96	27
Brøndby	2022–23	Danish Superliga	24	6	1	0	—		—		—		25	6
Brøndby	2023–24	Danish Superliga	31	13	3	0	—		—		—		34	13
Brøndby	2024–25	Danish Superliga	25	5	4	2	—		0	0	—		29	7
Brøndby	2025–26	Danish Superliga	30	7	2	1	—		5 (Note: Appearances in UEFA Conference League)	2	1 (Note: Appearance in Danish Superliga play-off)	0	38	10
Brøndby	Total		110	31	10	—		3	5	2	1	0	126	36
FC Tokyo	2026–27	J1 League	0	0	0	0	0	0	—		—		0	0
Career total			277	90	18	6	0	0	7	2	1	0	303	98

== Honours ==
Individual

- Danish Superliga Player of the Season: 2023–24
- Brøndby Player of the Year: 2023
- Tipsbladet Player of the Spring: 2022
- Tipsbladet Player of the Fall: 2023
- Danish Superliga Player of the Month: February 2023, August 2023, February 2024
- Danish Superliga Team of the Month: August 2023, November 2023, February 2024, March 2024
- Tipsbladet Team of the Season: 2022
