= Thomas Mikkelsen =

Thomas Mikkelsen may refer to:

- Thomas Mikkelsen (footballer, born 1983), Danish football goalkeeper
- Thomas Mikkelsen (footballer, born 1990), Danish football forward
