= Marko Divković =

Croatian footballer (born 1999)

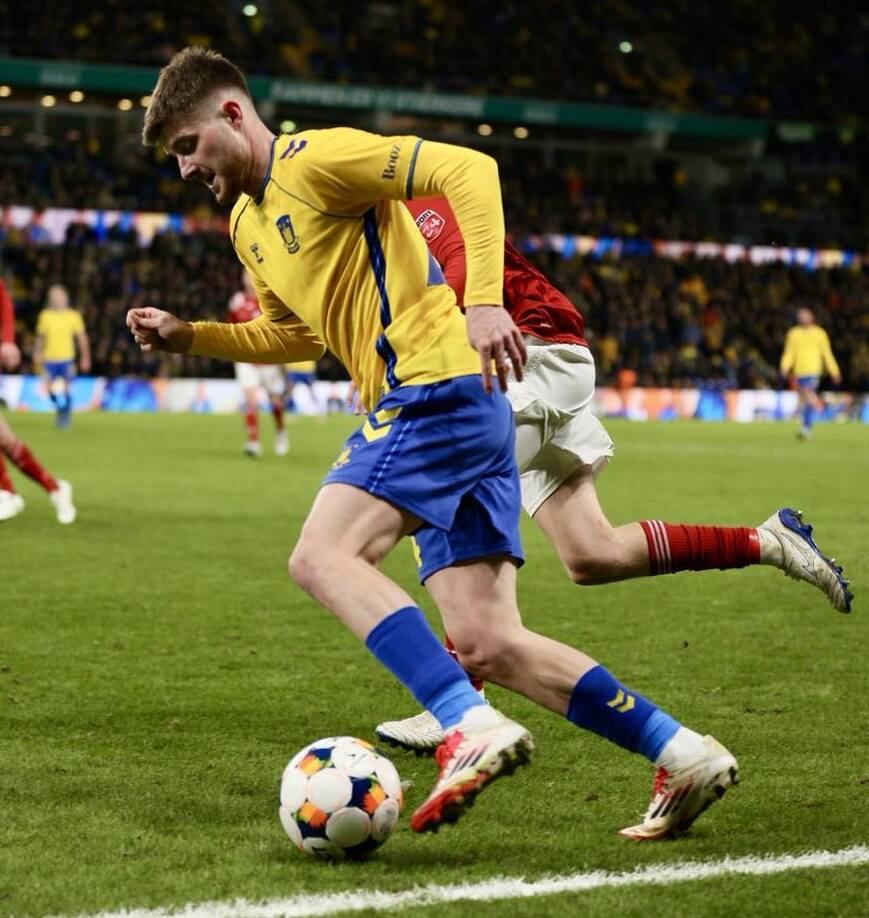
- Divković in 2025 with Brøndby

Personal information
- Full name: Marko Divković
- Date of birth: 11 June 1999 (age 27)
- Place of birth: Vinkovci, Croatia
- Height: 1.81 m (5 ft 11 in)
- Positions: Wing-back; winger

Team information
- Current team: Brøndby
- Number: 24

Youth career
- 2006–2008: Polet Donje Novo Selo
- 2008–2013: NK Otok
- 2013–2016: Arsenal Soccer School Greece
- 2017: DAC Dunajská Streda

Senior career*
Years	Team	Apps	(Gls)
2017–2022	DAC Dunajská Streda	115	(25)
2021–2022	→ Brøndby (loan)	28	(3)
2022–	Brøndby	105	(8)

International career
2020–2021	Croatia U21	2	(0)
- * Club domestic league appearances and goals as of 08:59, 2 November 2026 (UTC)

Marko Divković (born 11 June 1999) is a Croatian professional footballer who plays as a left wing-back or left winger for Danish Superliga club Brøndby.

After passing through Arsenal's academy in Greece, Divković began his senior career in Slovakia with DAC Dunajská Streda, where he spent four and a half seasons. He joined Brøndby on loan in 2021 and permanently a year later. After Jesper Sørensen converted him into a wing-back in 2023, he became one of the club's most versatile and long-serving players.

== Club career ==
=== Early years ===
Divković began playing football at his local club, Polet Donje Novo Selo in Donje Novo Selo, before moving to the larger NK Otok. There he caught the eye of scouts from Arsenal and moved to the club's Greek academy in Loutraki. At the start of 2017, aged 17, he joined Slovak club DAC Dunajská Streda.

=== DAC Dunajská Streda ===
Divković made his Slovak Super Liga debut on the opening day of the 2017–18 season, 22 July 2017. He came on in the second half against Železiarne Podbrezová in place of Slovak international Erik Pačinda, who had scored the only goal in a 1–0 win. He went on to make 28 league appearances in his first season, scoring three goals.

Divković became a more regular presence over the next two seasons, scoring five league goals in each. DAC finished as runners-up in 2018–19 and qualified for the Europa League. He featured in the first qualifying round against Cracovia that summer, when DAC went through on away goals after a 2–2 draw after extra time in Kraków.

His breakthrough came in the 2020–21 season. Usually deployed on the right wing, the left-footed forward liked to cut inside and use his pace to run in behind defences. He scored ten goals and provided five assists in his first 16 appearances of the campaign. On 17 September 2020, he scored twice as DAC beat Jablonec 5–3 after extra time in the second qualifying round of the Europa League. A week later, DAC were beaten 7–0 by LASK in the next round.

In the league, Divković scored 12 goals as DAC finished second. Only Eric Ramírez and Zsolt Kalmár scored more for the club, and his tally put him joint fifth in the division. His goals included the only goal of a 1–0 win away to Slovan Bratislava on 9 May 2021. The club later named it among its best goals of the year. He played six league matches at the start of the 2021–22 season before leaving on loan for Brøndby at the end of August. By then he had made 115 league appearances and scored 25 goals for DAC.

=== Brøndby ===
On 31 August 2021, Divković joined Brøndby on a season-long loan with an option to buy. His debut came on 16 September in the Europa League group stage, when he replaced Mikael Uhre in the 69th minute of a goalless draw with Sparta Prague. Three days later he made his Superliga debut as a second-half substitute for Simon Hedlund in a 1–0 defeat away to SønderjyskE. On 3 March 2022, Brøndby took up the option to buy him, and he signed a four-year contract that began in July.

The turning point of Divković's Brøndby career came at the start of the 2023–24 season. After Blas Riveros left, head coach Jesper Sørensen converted him from a winger into a left wing-back. He quickly made the role his own, drawing praise for his forward runs and accurate crossing, which brought a string of assists. Berlingske reported that Brøndby had blocked a transfer that summer. He was named in the Superliga Team of the Month for September 2023.

Divković remained a key figure after Steve Cooper took charge in September 2025. He was a regular in Cooper's side through the autumn and captained the team in a home match against Nordsjælland in November. With his contract due to expire in the summer of 2026, he held talks with Polish club Raków Częstochowa in January. Sporting director Benjamin Schmedes confirmed the talks while saying that Brøndby were still negotiating an extension.

On 30 January 2026, Divković signed a new contract with Brøndby until the summer of 2028. By then he had made 134 appearances for the club and scored 13 goals. Schmedes praised his work ethic and versatility, calling players like him a gift to any coach. Divković said he regarded the club as his home.

== International career ==
Divković received a provisional call-up to the Croatia under-21 squad in August 2019 but was not used. His debut came on 17 November 2020 in the final qualifier for the 2021 UEFA European Under-21 Championship. He started a 7–0 win over Lithuania and was replaced by Ivan Dolček in the 77th minute.

In March 2021, head coach Igor Bišćan named Divković in Croatia's squad for the group stage of the tournament in Hungary and Slovenia. He won his second cap on 31 March 2021, coming on in the 86th minute of the final group match, a 2–1 defeat to England. Croatia still reached the quarter-finals, but Divković was left out of the squad for the knockout stage.

== Career statistics ==
As of match played 1 November 2026

Appearances and goals by club, season and competition
Club	Season	League			National cup (Note: Includes Slovak Cup, Danish Cup)		Europe		Other		Total	
Club	Season	Division	Apps	Goals	Apps	Goals	Apps	Goals	Apps	Goals	Apps	Goals
DAC Dunajská Streda	2017–18	Fortuna liga	28	3	4	2	—		—		32	5
DAC Dunajská Streda	2018–19	Fortuna liga	25	5	4	0	2 (Note: Appearances in UEFA Europa League)	0	—		31	5
DAC Dunajská Streda	2019–20	Fortuna liga	24	5	7	0	4	1	—		35	6
DAC Dunajská Streda	2020–21	Fortuna liga	32	12	2	1	3	2	—		37	15
DAC Dunajská Streda	2021–22	Fortuna liga	6	0	0	0	2 (Note: Appearances in UEFA Conference League)	0	—		8	0
DAC Dunajská Streda	Total		115	25	17	3	11	3	—		143	31
Brøndby (loan)	2021–22	Danish Superliga	23	1	3	2	2	0	—		28	3
Brøndby	2022–23	Danish Superliga	11	0	1	0	4	2	—		16	2
Brøndby	2023–24	Danish Superliga	28	2	4	0	—		—		32	2
Brøndby	2024–25	Danish Superliga	27	1	5	2	1	0	—		33	3
Brøndby	2025–26	Danish Superliga	29	4	2	0	6	0	1 (Note: Appearance in Danish Superliga play-off)	0	38	4
Brøndby	2026–27	Danish Superliga	10	1	1	0	—		—		11	1
Brøndby	Total		105	8	13	2	11	2	1	0	130	12
Career total			243	34	33	7	24	5	1	0	301	46

== Honours ==
Individual

- Slovak Super Liga U-21 Team of the Season: 2020–21
- Superliga Team of the Month: September 2023, October 2023
