= Bertram Kvist =

Danish footballer (born 2005)

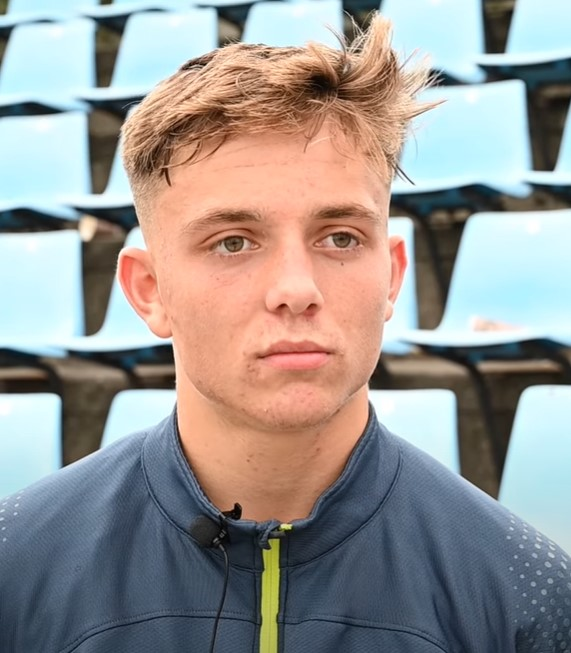
- Kvist in 2021

Personal information
- Full name: Bertram Bangsted Kvist
- Date of birth: 19 March 2005 (age 21)
- Place of birth: Dragør, Denmark
- Height: 1.72 m (5 ft 8 in)
- Position: Attacking midfielder

Team information
- Current team: Næstved
- Number: 10

Youth career
- 2008–2017: Dragør
- 2017–2022: Brøndby

Senior career*
Years	Team	Apps	(Gls)
2022–2025	Brøndby	1	(0)
2024	→ Kolding (loan)	5	(0)
2025	Esbjerg fB	1	(0)
2025–	Næstved	32	(5)

International career
2020–2021	Denmark U16	4	(2)
2021–2022	Denmark U17	14	(1)
2022	Denmark U18	5	(3)
- * Club domestic league appearances and goals as of 18 June 2026

Bertram Bangsted Kvist (born 19 March 2005) is a Danish professional footballer who plays for Danish 2nd Division side Næstved. He has represented Denmark at youth levels.

== Career ==
=== Brøndby ===
Kvist is known as a lifelong Brøndby IF supporter, being a season-ticket holder at Sydsiden Stand at Brøndby Stadium among other hardcore fans.

On 16 June 2022, Kvist signed a three-year contract with Brøndby which tied him to the club until the summer 2025. He was officially promoted to the first team during 2022–23 pre-season and handed the number 32 shirt. A few weeks later Bertram swapped to shirt number 19 with Frederik Alves who took over number 32 which he prefers.

He made his professional debut on 24 July 2022 at the age of 17 years and 127 days during the second matchday of the 2022–23 season in the Danish Superliga at Brøndby Stadium against Nordsjælland

On 1 August 2024, two years after his first-team debut, Kvist made his second appearance for the club, also marking his European debut. He replaced Christian Cappis in the 88th minute of a 2–2 draw in the second qualifying round.

==== Loan to Kolding ====
On 20 August 2024, Kvist was sent on a one-season loan to Danish 1st Division club Kolding. He played just under 90 minutes in five league matches and two cup matches before returning to Brøndy at the end of the year.

In January 2024, it emerged that Kvist was on trial at Swedish Superettan club Trelleborgs FF. A few days later, on 13 January 2025, Brøndby confirmed that they had terminated Kvist's contract by mutual agreement.

=== Esbjerg fB ===
On 7 February 2025, following a trial period, Danish 1st Division club Esbjerg fB announced the signing of Kvist on a contract running until the end of the season.

=== Næstved BK ===
On 10 July 2025, Kvist joined Danish 2nd Division side Næstved Boldklub.

== International career ==
Kvist is a youth international for Denmark, having gained caps between under-16 and under-20 levels.

== Career statistics ==
As of match played 24 November 2024

Appearances and goals by club, season and competition
Club	Season	League			Cup		Europe		Other		Total	
Club	Season	Division	Apps	Goals	Apps	Goals	Apps	Goals	Apps	Goals	Apps	Goals
Brøndby	2022–23	Superliga	1	0	0	0	0	0	0	0	1	0
Brøndby	2024–25	Superliga	0	0	0	0	1 (Note: Appearance(s) in UEFA Conference League)	0	—		1	0
Brøndby	Total		1	0	0	0	1	0	0	0	2	0
Kolding (loan)	2024–25	1st Division	5	0	2	1	—		—		7	1
Esbjerg fB	2024–25	1st Division	0	0	0	0	—		—		0	0
Career total			6	0	2	1	1	0	0	0	9	1
