= Oscar Schwartau =

Danish footballer (born 2006)

Personal information
- Full name: Oscar Schwartau
- Date of birth: 17 May 2006 (age 20)
- Place of birth: Sengeløse, Denmark
- Height: 1.86 m (6 ft 1 in)
- Position: Attacking midfielder

Team information
- Current team: Norwich City
- Number: 29

Youth career
- 2013–2015: Sengeløse GI
- 2015–2016: Fløng-Hedehusene Fodbold
- 2016–2018: FC Roskilde
- 2018–2022: Brøndby

Senior career*
Years	Team	Apps	(Gls)
2022–2024	Brøndby	36	(4)
2024–	Norwich City	74	(6)

International career^{‡}
2021–2022	Denmark U16	9	(3)
2022–2023	Denmark U17	5	(3)
2023	Denmark U18	2	(1)
2022–2025	Denmark U19	23	(7)
2025–	Denmark U21	4	(1)
Medal record
Men's football
Representing Denmark
UEFA European Under-17 Championship
Bronze medal – third place	2024 Cyprus
- * Club domestic league appearances and goals as of 07:39, 19 April 2026 (UTC) ‡ National team caps and goals as of 01:07, 3 April 2026 (UTC)

Oscar Schwartau (born 17 May 2006) is a Danish professional footballer who plays as an attacking midfielder for EFL Championship club Norwich City. He has represented Denmark at youth levels.

== Club career ==
=== Brøndby ===
On 17 May 2022, Schwartau signed a three-year contract with Brøndby IF which tied him to the club until the summer 2025. He was officially promoted to the first team during 2022–23 pre-season and assigned the number 41 jersey.

He made his professional debut on 17 July 2022 in the season opener of the Danish Superliga against AGF at the age of 16 years and 61 days. In doing so, he became the youngest player in club history and also became the first player born in 2006 to make an appearance in the Danish Superliga. On 14 August, he scored his first goal in a 2–0 win against OB becoming the club's youngest league goalscorer, and second-youngest overall in Danish Superliga.

=== Norwich City ===
On 24 August 2024, English Championship club Norwich City signed Schwartau on a four-year deal with a club option of an extra year. The fee was undisclosed, but reported to be £2 million with Brøndby retaining a 15% sell-on clause. He scored his first goal for the club on 26 December 2024 against Millwall at Carrow Road.

At the end of Norwich City's 2025–26 season, Schwartau was named as the young player of the season.

== International career ==
Schwartau has represented Denmark at various youth international levels. He made his debut for the Denmark under-16 national team on 17 September 2021 in a friendly match against Portugal, which ended in a 1–1 draw in Kolding. Over the course of his U16 tenure, he earned seven caps and scored three goals before aging out of the squad.

Following his time with the U16s, Schwartau progressed to the Denmark U17 team, making his first appearance on 21 September 2022 in a 4–2 friendly victory over Austria in Vienna. His rapid development earned him a call-up to the Denmark under-19s just two months later, despite being younger than many of his peers. In November 2022, head coach Jens Fønsskov Olsen included him in the squad for two friendly matches against the Czech Republic, held in San Pedro del Pinatar, Spain. Schwartau featured in both fixtures, contributing to Denmark's 3–2 and 3–1 wins, respectively.

== Career statistics ==
As of match played 2 May 2026

Appearances and goals by club, season and competition
Club	Season	League			National cup (Note: Includes Danish Cup, FA Cup)		League cup (Note: Includes EFL Cup)		Europe		Total	
Club	Season	Division	Apps	Goals	Apps	Goals	Apps	Goals	Apps	Goals	Apps	Goals
Brøndby	2022–23	Danish Superliga	18	4	1	0	—		2 (Note: Appearances in UEFA Europa Conference League)	0	21	4
Brøndby	2023–24	Danish Superliga	14	0	3	1	—		—		17	1
Brøndby	2024–25	Danish Superliga	4	0	0	0	—		4	1	8	1
Brøndby	Total		36	4	4	1	—		6	1	46	6
Norwich City	2024–25	Championship	40	1	1	0	1	0	—		42	1
Norwich City	2025–26	Championship	34	4	2	0	2	0	—		38	4
Norwich City	Total		74	5	3	0	3	0	—		80	5
Career total			110	9	7	1	3	0	6	1	126	11
