= Mathias Greve =

Danish footballer (born 1995)

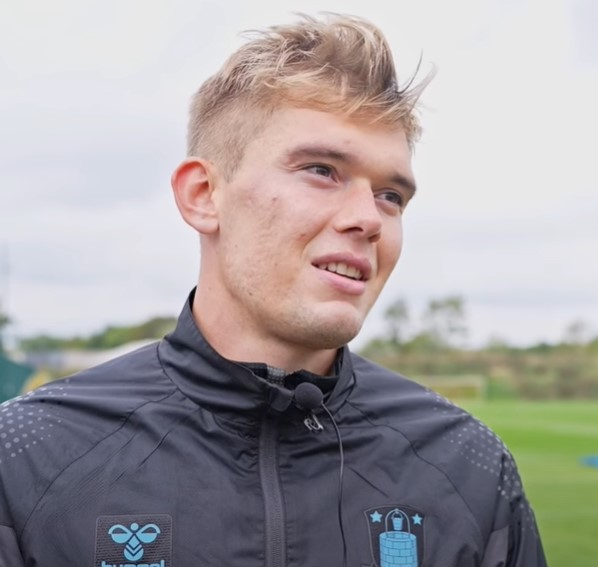
- Greve in 2022

Personal information
- Full name: Mathias Peter Greve Petersen
- Date of birth: 11 February 1995 (age 31)
- Place of birth: Langeskov, Denmark
- Height: 1.86 m (6 ft 1 in)
- Position: Midfielder

Team information
- Current team: Randers
- Number: 17

Youth career
- 1999–2006: Langeskov IF
- 2006–2014: OB

Senior career*
Years	Team	Apps	(Gls)
2014–2020	OB	137	(10)
2020–2021	Randers	44	(8)
2021–2024	Brøndby	78	(3)
2024–	Randers	53	(7)

International career
2014	Denmark U20	1	(0)
2015–2016	Denmark U21	6	(0)
- * Club domestic league appearances and goals as of 19 May 2026

Mathias Peter Greve Petersen (Danish pronunciation: [ˈkʁeːw]; born 11 February 1995) is a Danish professional footballer who plays as a midfielder for Danish Superliga club Randers.

A product of the Odense Boldklub (OB) academy, Greve was promoted to their first team in 2014. He grew into an established player for de Striwede over the following seasons, making more than 150 appearances for the club. In January 2020, he moved to league rivals Randers. Greve became a key player for the club at left wing, helping the club to a Danish Cup win in the 2020–21 season. His performances earned him a transfer to defending Danish Superliga champions Brøndby in August 2021.

Greve represented Denmark at under-20 and under-21 levels. He earned seven total caps for the youth national teams.

== Early life and career ==
Mathias Greve was born on 11 February 1995 in Langeskov, Kerteminde Municipality, on the eastern part of the island of Funen, Denmark. Greve's introduction to football occurred when he was four years old. During one of his initial training sessions at local club Langeskov IF, an incident where he slipped in a puddle left him disinterested in the sport for the next couple of days. However, his father was persistent in giving football another chance. Sports ran deep in Greve's family, and his relatives played football, handball, and badminton which shaped their daily lives. Greve quickly grew into a talented footballer, and during school recesses he was recognised as someone who could easily dribble past four or five classmates, displaying a finesse that set him apart.

When Greve turned twelve, he joined Odense Boldklub's (OB) academy, the main club on the island of Funen. Despite the move, which confirmed him as one of the most talented players of the region, it was equally important for Greve to evolve beyond the football pitch. Greve talked about his focus on a career beyond football:

I discovered my talent when the youth talent groups started. However, I also placed a high priority on my studies. That was something I had learned at home. Despite not always having it at the forefront of my mind, school was my parents' top priority for me, until football turned professional … It was the classic agreement where I could pursue football as long as my grades were up to par. Honestly, this arrangement suited me well, as I've always enjoyed attending school and learning … I needed to be mentally engaged to become a better footballer. That's why I've pursued some academic studies since turning professional. After taking a gap year following high school, I attempted to study law, but it proved to be quite challenging alongside football.

The combination of increased training volume and the 18-kilometer distance from his home in Langeskov to Odense meant that just over a year after joining OB, Greve decided to enroll in an elite sports class at Hjalleseskolen in the southern part of Odense and later move to the city with his family. Here, Greve could continue his education, which, after completing his primary schooling, led to earning a high school diploma and later, a degree in financial economics.

== Club career ==
=== OB ===
Greve's initial period at OB saw a promising start followed by a challenging phase. As an under-15 player, he was considered a national talent, but a growth spurt eluded him during the under-17 year, leaving him among the smaller players. However, his eventual growth surge rekindled his talent, as he was able to become more dominant physically, and during his under-19 years, both Greve and OB noticed significant development. This progress led to an offer of a part-time contract that swiftly transitioned to a professional one in April 2014 due to his ability to excel among more experienced players. He was also promoted to the first team ahead of the 2014–15 season. During this period, he has mentioned that he looked up to Rasmus Falk and Emil Larsen, both midfield profiles at the club.

Greve made his professional debut for Striwerne on 25 July 2014. Greve started on the bench, but replaced Darko Bodul in the 78th minute in a 3–1 defeat against Vestsjælland in the Danish Superliga. On 19 January 2015, he extended his contract until 2018, after having made five appearances for the club. Upon extending, he was praised by head coach Ove Pedersen: "He has demonstrated a fantastic attitude, and it's even more impressive as he has delivered results both in practice and matches, even when he has occasionally been sent down to the under-19 squad." Greve experienced in first breakthrough in the second half of the season, starting his first game for OB in a 2–0 away loss against Brøndby on 15 March 2015. After becoming a more integral part of the team, he scored his first goal for OB on 31 May 2015 in the 79th minute of a 2–2 draw against Hobro in the domestic league.

Greve started the 2015–16 season as a substitute, as players such as Mikkel Desler and Kenneth Zohore were preferred in his position under new head coach Kent Nielsen. However, as the season progressed, he saw his chances increase as he would also receive his first call-up for the Denmark national under-21 team. On 1 November 2015, Greve signed a four-year contract extension keeping him in Odense until 2019.

In January 2018, Greve extended his contract with OB until 2021, after having grown into a starter for the club in the previous seasons. However, in the 2018–19 season, he played less and only made 12 starts in 24 appearances. The limited playing time continued into the 2019–20 season, and in January 2020 he stayed home from OB's training camp in Belek, Turkey, to negotiate with other clubs. During his time at the club, he scored 12 goals in 151 total appearances.

=== Randers ===
On 27 January 2020, Greve joined Randers on a three-year contract and was assigned shirt number 22. He was seen as the replacement at left wing for Saba Lobzhanidze, who had left for MKE Ankaragücü. On 23 February, he made his debut for the club in a 0–0 home draw against his former side OB, replacing Tosin Kehinde in the 66th minute. He made his first start for Hestene on 1 March, helping his team to a 2–1 away victory against AC Horsens. He scored his first goal on 16 June in a 4–0 win over Hobro after an assist by Simon Piesinger. After six months at Randers, where he had quickly grown into a starter, he shared in an interview with local newspaper Randers Amtsavis that the main contrast between OB and Randers was his ability now to stand out within a physically oriented team:

Switching to a 4–4–2 formation at Randers FC introduced me to a different system compared to my last days at OB. However, the most significant distinction has been the heightened physical emphasis in the gameplay here, as opposed to OB. But I view this as an advantage, as it allows me to contribute something unique to the team, a trait not possessed by many others. They possess other strengths such as power and athleticism, qualities that were more prevalent in OB, where there were more players who shared similarities with my playing style. Now, I can more effectively set myself apart.

Greve had his best season yet in the 2020–21 season, scoring eight goals in 39 total appearances and helping Randers to their second ever Danish Cup win.

=== Brøndby ===
After a strong start to the 2021–22 season with two assist and one goal in the first three games of the campaign for Randers, Greve was sold to 2020–21 Danish Superliga champions Brøndby on 4 August 2021, signing a deal until June 2025. He made his debut against rivals Copenhagen on 8 August in a 4–2 away loss.

=== Return to Randers ===
On 30 August 2024, Greve returned to Randers on a four-year contract.

== International career ==
Greve made his debut for a national team under the Danish Football Association (DBU) in a friendly on 2 September 2014, for the under-20 national team. He started on the bench but came on in the 52nd minute for Mathias Hebo in a 1–0 victory over the United Arab Emirates U20 at Slovenský Grob, Slovakia. This marked his only appearance for the under-20s.

On 27 March 2015, he made his debut for the Denmark national under-21s, simultaneously earning his first international start. However, after 64 minutes, he was replaced by Hebo in a 2–0 friendly defeat to Turkey U21. He made six total appearances for the national under-21 team.

== Career statistics ==
As of matches played 18 August 2024

Appearances and goals by club, season and competition
Club	Season	League			National cup		Europe		Total	
Club	Season	Division	Apps	Goals	Apps	Goals	Apps	Goals	Apps	Goals
OB	2014–15	Superliga	17	1	1	0	—		18	1
OB	2015–16	Superliga	26	3	1	0	—		27	3
OB	2016–17	Superliga	28	2	2	0	—		30	2
OB	2017–18	Superliga	32	3	3	1	—		35	4
OB	2018–19	Superliga	21	0	5	0	—		26	0
OB	2019–20	Superliga	13	1	2	1	—		15	2
OB	Total		137	10	14	2	—		144	12
Randers	2019–20	Superliga	10	1	1	1	—		11	2
Randers	2020–21	Superliga	31	6	8	2	—		39	8
Randers	2021–22	Superliga	3	1	0	0	—		3	1
Randers	Total		44	8	9	3	—		53	11
Brøndby	2021–22	Superliga	25	1	4	0	6 (Note: Appearances in UEFA Champions League and UEFA Europa League)	0	35	1
Brøndby	2022–23	Superliga	25	0	1	0	3 (Note: Appearances in UEFA Conference League)	0	29	0
Brøndby	2023–24	Superliga	24	1	2	0	—		26	1
Brøndby	2024–25	Superliga	4	1	—		2	0	6	1
Brøndby	Total		78	3	7	0	11	0	96	3
Randers	2024–25	Superliga	0	0	0	0	—		0	0
Career total			259	21	30	5	11	0	300	26

== Honours ==
Randers

- Danish Cup: 2020–21
