= Noah Nartey =

Danish footballer (born 2005)

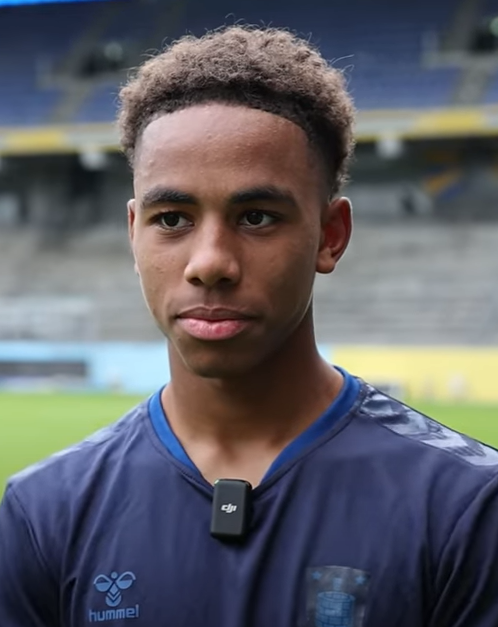
- Nartey in 2023

Personal information
- Full name: Noah Teye Nartey
- Date of birth: 5 October 2005 (age 21)
- Place of birth: Bagsværd, Denmark
- Height: 1.80 m (5 ft 11 in)
- Position: Midfielder

Team information
- Current team: Lyon
- Number: 99

Youth career
- 2012–2018: VB 1968
- 2018–2021: Copenhagen
- 2021–2024: Brøndby

Senior career*
| Years | Team | Apps | (Gls) |
| 2024–2026 | Brøndby | 54 | (7) |
| 2026– | Lyon | 20 | (2) |

International career^{‡}
| 2022 | Denmark U17 | 8 | (1) |
| 2022–2023 | Denmark U18 | 10 | (1) |
| 2023–2024 | Denmark U19 | 8 | (0) |
| 2024– | Denmark U21 | 10 | (0) |
- * Club domestic league appearances and goals as of 8 November 2026 ‡ National team caps and goals as of 28 September 2026

Noah Teye Nartey (born 5 October 2005) is a Danish professional footballer who plays as a midfielder for Ligue 1 club Lyon.

== Career ==
=== Early career ===
Nartey was born in Bagsværd, Gladsaxe Municipality, a suburb to Copenhagen, and was raised in Værebroparken, a public housing project. He began playing football at a young age, often alongside his friends and his older brother, fellow professional player Nikolas Nartey. At six years old, he joined Værebro Boldklub, where his journey into organised football began. Later, at the age of 12, he entered FC Copenhagen's academy, progressing through the various youth teams. Notably, he made a mark for the under-17 team, contributing a goal in the cup final (alongside Roony Bardghji), although they were defeated by Nordsjælland's U17s after penalties in 2021. Additionally, he played a pivotal role in securing the under-17 league title.

=== Brøndby ===
In August 2021, Nartey signed with Copenhagen's main rivals Brøndby, joining their academy at under-17 level. In November 2022, he signed a contract extension with the club, keeping him at the club until 2025.

Prior to the 2023–24 season, Nartey joined Brøndby's first team in pre-season training camp alongside Ludwig Vraa and Clement Bischoff. During the winter break, he impressed during training camp in Portugal, and was praised by his teammates. At that point, he was already a key player for Brøndby's under-19 team. On 25 February 2024, he made his professional debut in the Danish Superliga, replacing Daniel Wass in the 85th minute of a 3–0 away win over OB. The following month, on 17 March, he made his first start, helping his team to a 4–1 home victory against Silkeborg.

Nartey scored his first professional goal on 25 July 2024 in a UEFA Conference League qualifier against Llapi, contributing to a 6–0 victory for Brøndby. On 2 September, he signed a three-year contract extension, keeping him at the club until 2027. On 29 November, he scored his first Superliga goal, scoring the decisive goal in a 1–0 home win over AaB. The goal came after some time away from the starting lineup, which he described as "a learning experience".

After the winter break, Nartey scored a stoppage-time winning goal in a 4–3 Superliga victory over Randers on 21 April 2025. On 25 May 2025, he also scored in a 3–2 league victory against AGF. Throughout the spring of 2025, Nartey's performances prompted media speculation about his future, with commentators suggesting he would attract interest from clubs outside Denmark. In league play, he showed both attacking output and combative presence, though not without disciplinary moments; he received a red card in a 2–2 draw with Nordsjælland that saw his dismissal cost Brøndby a potential win.

At the start of the 2025–26 season, Nartey continued to feature regularly. He was named Danish Superliga Young Player of the Month in both September and October, following a run of goals and assists in league and cup competition. By the end of the 2025 calendar year, he had scored seven goals in all competitions and was named Brøndby IF Player of the Year.

Speculation regarding a potential transfer intensified during the second half of 2025. In September, Tipsbladet reported that French club Lyon had submitted a bid of approximately €7 million, which Brøndby rejected. Later that year, Bold reported that Nartey had declined a contract extension offered by Brøndby, which Brøndby sporting director Benjamin Schmedes confirmed in early January 2026. At the time of Nartey's departure later that month, he had made 71 competitive appearances for Brøndby, scoring 12 goals in all competitions.

=== Lyon ===
On 19 January 2026, Nartey signed a four-and-a-half-year contract with Ligue 1 club Lyon, running until June 2030. The reported fee was €7.5 million, rising to as much as €10 million with bonuses, and included a 20% sell-on clause in favour of Brøndby.

Nartey made his debut on 1 February 2026 and scored the only goal of a home win over Lille, and scored again two weeks later in a 2–0 win against Nice. The start earned him a first call-up to the senior Denmark squad in March 2026, although French reporting on his following matches was more measured, describing him as less influential and at times troubled by the physical demands of the league. He remained in the side the following season and scored in Lyon's opening Europa League league-phase match away to Anderlecht in September 2026.

== Style of play ==
Nartey characterises himself as a dynamic, fast-paced player with a knack for dribbling past opponents. He possesses a strong drive when in possession of the ball and has drawn comparisons to Paul Pogba in terms of his passing and dribbling prowess.

== Personal life ==
Nartey is of Ghanaian descent through his father and his mother is Danish. He is younger brother of Nikolas Nartey, the professional footballer who currently plays for VfB Stuttgart.

== Career statistics ==
As of match played 8 November 2026

Appearances and goals by club, season and competition
| Club | Season | League | | | National cup (Note: Includes Danish Cup, Coupe de France) | | Europe | | Other | | Total | |
| Club | Season | Division | Apps | Goals | Apps | Goals | Apps | Goals | Apps | Goals | Apps | Goals |
|---|---|---|---|---|---|---|---|---|---|---|---|---|
| Brøndby | 2023–24 | Danish Superliga | 9 | 0 | 0 | 0 | — | | — | | 9 | 0 |
| Brøndby | 2024–25 | Danish Superliga | 28 | 3 | 5 | 1 | 4 (Note: Appearances in UEFA Conference League) | 1 | — | | 37 | 5 |
| Brøndby | 2025–26 | Danish Superliga | 17 | 4 | 2 | 3 | 6 | 0 | — | | 25 | 7 |
| Brøndby | Total | | 54 | 7 | 7 | 4 | 10 | 1 | — | | 71 | 12 |
| Lyon | 2025–26 | Ligue 1 | 11 | 2 | 2 | 0 | 2 (Note: Appearances in UEFA Europa League) | 0 | — | | 15 | 2 |
| Lyon | 2026–27 | Ligue 1 | 9 | 1 | 0 | 0 | 4 (Note: One appearance in UEFA Champions League, three appearances and one goal in UEFA Europa League) | 1 | — | | 13 | 2 |
| Lyon | Total | | 20 | 3 | 2 | 0 | 6 | 1 | — | | 28 | 4 |
| Career total | | | 74 | 10 | 9 | 4 | 16 | 2 | 0 | 0 | 99 | 16 |

== Honours ==
Individual

- Danish Superliga Young Player of the Month: September 2025, October 2025
- Brøndby Player of the Year: 2025
