= Ahmed Iljazovski =

Macedonian footballer (born 1997)

Personal information
- Full name: Ahmed Iljazovski; Ахмед Илјазовски
- Date of birth: 31 July 1997 (age 29)
- Place of birth: Hellerup, Denmark
- Height: 1.88 m (6 ft 2 in)
- Position: Right-back

Team information
- Current team: Hvidovre
- Number: 15

Youth career
- 2011–2016: HIK

Senior career*
Years	Team	Apps	(Gls)
2016–2018	HIK	53	(0)
2016	→ Herlev (loan)	5	(0)
2018–2019	Brønshøj	14	(0)
2019–2020	Skovshoved	23	(0)
2020–	Hvidovre	147	(8)

International career^{‡}
2023–	North Macedonia	5	(0)
- * Club domestic league appearances and goals as of 2 June 2026 ‡ National team caps and goals as of 15 November 2024

Ahmed Iljazovski (Macedonian: Ахмед Илјазовски; Albanian: Ahmet Iljazi; born 31 July 1997) is a professional footballer who plays as a right-back for the Danish club Hvidovre. Born in Denmark, he plays for the North Macedonia national team.

== Career ==
Iljazovski is a youth product of Hellerup IK, and began his senior career on a loan with Herlev in early 2016. He signed his first professional contract with Hellerup on 10 October 2016 for 2 seasons. He had a short trial with the Dutch club SC Cambuur in 2018. The following season he began his senior career with Brønshøj in the Danish 2nd Division where he made 14 appearances. He transferred to Skovshoved 2019, and made 23 appearances in his debut season. On 2 September 2020, he transferred to Hvidovre playing in the Danish 1st Division. On 21 May 2021, he extended his contract with Hvidovre after maintaining in the division. He helped them come in second for the 2022–23 Danish 1st Division, earning promotion to the Danish Superliga.

== International career ==
Iljazovski was born in Denmark to Macedonian parents and holds dual citizenship. He was called up to the North Macedonia national team for a set of Euro 2024 qualifying matches in September 2023. On 9 September 2023, he debuted as a substitute in a 1–1 tie with Italy.

== Personal life ==
He is married.

== Honours ==
Individual

- Superliga Team of the Month: July 2023
