= Kevin Tshiembe =

Danish footballer (born 1997)

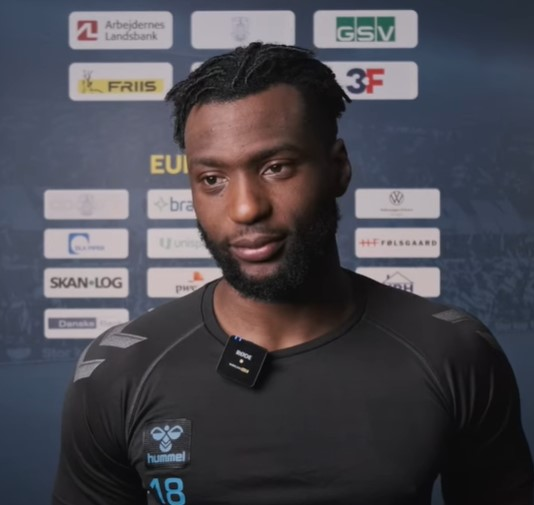
- Tshiembe in 2023

Personal information
- Full name: Kevin N'goyi Tshiembe
- Date of birth: 31 March 1997 (age 29)
- Place of birth: Copenhagen, Denmark
- Height: 1.85 m (6 ft 1 in)
- Position: Centre-back

Team information
- Current team: Vålerenga
- Number: 5

Youth career
- Brønshøj
- –2013: Copenhagen
- 2013–2014: AB
- 2014–2017: Lyngby

Senior career*
| Years | Team | Apps | (Gls) |
| 2017–2021 | Lyngby | 79 | (2) |
| 2021–2025 | Brøndby | 67 | (0) |
| 2025– | Vålerenga | 23 | (0) |
- * Club domestic league appearances and goals as of 14:27, 16 June 2026 (UTC)

Kevin N'goyi Tshiembe (Danish pronunciation: [ˈtɕempə]; born 31 March 1997) is a Danish professional footballer who plays as a centre-back for Vålerenga in the Eliteserien.

== Early life ==
Born in Copenhagen, Denmark, Tshiembe's parents arrived in Denmark from Zaire – which is today the Democratic Republic of the Congo – in 1996, the year before his birth. He grew up in Tingbjerg, a large housing project in the district of Brønshøj-Husum.

== Club career ==
=== Early career ===
Tshiembe began playing football at an early age for local club Brønshøj Boldklub before being scouted by Copenhagen. He then joined Akademisk Boldklub (AB) before moving to the Lyngby Boldklub academy as a 17-year-old.

=== Lyngby ===
Tshiembe made his debut for Lyngby Boldklub on 31 August 2017. He played the whole game, which ended with a in a 3–1 win over Frederiksværk Boldklub in the Danish Cup.

On 20 June 2017, Tshiembe signed his first professional contract, and was promoted to the first-team squad. Tshiembe made his European debut on 3 August 2017 in a 1–3 home loss to Krasnodar in the UEFA Europa League third qualifying round. He came on as a substitute for Thomas Sørensen in the 84th minute. He made his debut in the Danish Superliga on 11 February 2018 in a 1–3 home loss to Brøndby IF, with Tshiembe scoring an own goal after 23 minutes.

He suffered relegation to the Danish 1st Division with the club on 9 May 2021 after a loss to last placed AC Horsens.

=== Brøndby ===
On 4 August 2021, Tshiembe signed a four-year contract with 2020–21 Danish Superliga champions Brøndby. He made his debut against rivals Copenhagen on 8 August in a 2–4 away loss. On 17 August, he made his debut in the UEFA Champions League in a 1–2 away loss to Red Bull Salzburg in the first leg of the play-off round.

=== Vålerenga ===
On 12 January 2025, Tshiembe joined Vålerenga in Norway on a three-year deal.

== Personal life ==
Kevin is the younger brother of Delphin Tshiembe, who also is a professional footballer.
