= Frederik Alves =

Danish footballer (born 1999)

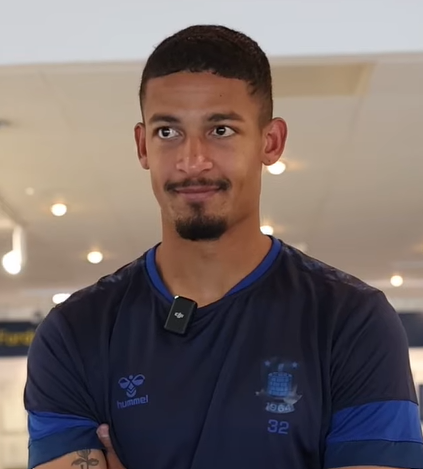
- Alves in 2023

Personal information
- Full name: Frederik Alves Ibsen
- Date of birth: 8 November 1999 (age 27)
- Place of birth: Hvidovre, Denmark
- Height: 1.95 m (6 ft 5 in)
- Position: Centre-back

Team information
- Current team: Brøndby
- Number: 32

Youth career
- Herfølge
- Hvidovre
- 2015–2016: Coritiba
- 2017–2018: Silkeborg

Senior career*
Years	Team	Apps	(Gls)
2018–2021	Silkeborg	47	(0)
2021–2022	West Ham United	0	(0)
2021–2022	→ Sunderland (loan)	3	(0)
2022–	Brøndby	82	(3)

International career
2019	Denmark U20	3	(0)
2019–2021	Denmark U21	5	(0)
- * Club domestic league appearances and goals as of 14:34, 2 November 2026 (UTC)

Frederik Alves Ibsen (born 8 November 1999) is a Danish professional footballer who plays as a centre-back for Danish Superliga club Brøndby. Alves also played for Denmark in youth levels, most recently national U21 team.

== Club career ==
=== Youth career ===
Due to Alves' Brazilian background, he travelled to visit some family in Brazil. Alves played with his cousins and took part in a few training matches, before he was spotted by an agent, which he made a deal with. The agent then brought 15-year old Alves to Coritiba. Alves returned to Denmark after two years in Brazil and joined Silkeborg.

=== Silkeborg ===
In the summer 2018, 19-year old Alves signed a one-year trainee-contract with Silkeborg which meant, that he was going to train with the first team but play with the U19s. On 26 September 2018, Alves got his official debut for Silkeborg in a Danish Cup game against Næstved BK, where he was among the 11 starting players. On 1 November 2018, he signed a new deal until the end of 2020. Except for the following two games, Alves played all of the remaining games for Silkeborg and helped the team promoting to the Danish Superliga which also gained him a spot on the Danish U-20 national team. On 1 June 2019, Alves signed a new contract until the summer 2024.

=== West Ham United ===
On 4 November 2020, Silkeborg announced that they had sold Alves to an unnamed club, believed to be English Premier League club West Ham United. On 22 December 2020, West Ham announced the signing of Alves for an undisclosed fee, on a three-and-a-half-year contract commencing on 2 January 2021.

==== Loan to Sunderland ====
Alves joined Sunderland on a season-long loan for the 2021–22 EFL League One season on 13 August 2021. He made his Sunderland debut, in the EFL Cup on 24 August, in a 3–2 win against Blackpool. On 14 January 2022, Alves' loan to Sunderland was cut short and he returned to West Ham United. During his loan period "disciplinary issues" occurred forcing him to be omitted from the team. He also suffered lack of game time as he could not force his way into the team ahead of Callum Doyle, Tom Flanagan and Bailey Wright. He played 10 games in all competitions during his loan at Sunderland.

=== Brøndby ===
On 31 January 2022, Alves returned to Denmark to join reigning Danish Superliga champions Brøndby on a four-and-a-half-year contract. He made his competitive debut on 6 March 2022, coming on as a late substitute for Mathias Kvistgaarden in a 1–0 league win away to his former club Silkeborg.

Alves scored his first goal for the club on 3 December 2023, contributing to a 4–0 Superliga victory over Hvidovre at Brøndby Stadium. Later that season he suffered an Achilles injury which developed into an infection, requiring surgery in March 2024 and ruling him out for the remainder of the 2023–24 campaign.

On 23 January 2025, Alves signed a new contract with Brøndby, extending his stay until June 2028. During the same transfer window, Danish media reported interest from Trabzonspor in signing him, which ultimately came to nothing—a story Alves later confirmed himself.

== Style of play ==
Alves has described his playing style as "a defender who likes to play with the ball at my feet, but I also like defending and am good in my duels", drawing inspiration from German international defender Jérôme Boateng. The Athletic has praised Alves' versatility, owing to his ability to use both feet and being able to operate at right-back. Upon signing for Brøndby, director of football Carsten V. Jensen labelled Alves as "calm on the ball" with "great physical qualities".

== Personal life ==
Alves' mother is Brazilian, while his father is Danish. For this reason, Alves has dual citizenship although he was born and raised in Hvidovre, Denmark.

== Career statistics ==
As of match played 1 November 2026

Appearances and goals by club, season and competition
Club	Season	League			National cup (Note: Includes Danish Cup, FA Cup)		League cup (Note: Includes EFL Cup)		Europe		Other		Total	
Club	Season	Division	Apps	Goals	Apps	Goals	Apps	Goals	Apps	Goals	Apps	Goals	Apps	Goals
Silkeborg	2018–19	Danish 1st Division	17	0	1	0	—		—		—		18	0
Silkeborg	2019–20	Danish Superliga	22	0	2	0	—		—		—		24	0
Silkeborg	2020–21	Danish 1st Division	8	0	0	0	—		—		—		8	0
Silkeborg	Club total		47	0	3	0	—		—		—		50	0
West Ham United	2020–21	Premier League	0	0	0	0	—		—		—		0	0
West Ham United	2021–22	Premier League	0	0	0	0	0	0	0	0	—		0	0
West Ham United	Club total		0	0	0	0	0	0	0	0	—		0	0
Sunderland (loan)	2021–22	League One	3	0	1	0	3	0	—		3 (Note: Appearances in the EFL Trophy)	0	10	0
Brøndby	2021–22	Danish Superliga	4	0	0	0	—		—		—		4	0
Brøndby	2022–23	Danish Superliga	17	0	0	0	—		2 (Note: Appearances in the UEFA Europa Conference League)	0	—		19	0
Brøndby	2023–24	Danish Superliga	16	1	3	0	—		—		—		19	1
Brøndby	2024–25	Danish Superliga	22	2	4	0	—		3	0	—		29	2
Brøndby	2025–26	Danish Superliga	15	0	2	0	—		3	0	0	0	20	0
Brøndby	2026–27	Danish Superliga	8	0	1	0	—		—		—		9	0
Brøndby	Club total		82	3	10	0	—		8	0	0	0	100	3
Career total			132	3	14	0	3	0	8	0	3	0	160	3

== Honours ==
Individual

- Superliga Team of the Month: August 2023
