= Thomas Mikkelsen (footballer, born 1983) =

Danish footballer (born 1983)

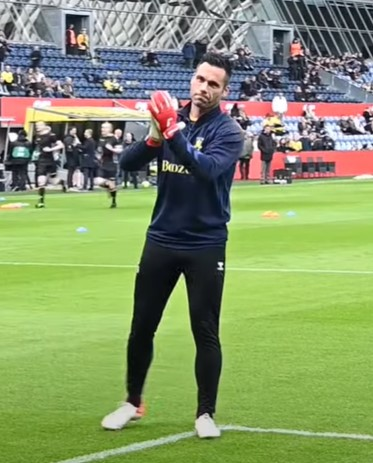
- Mikkelsen in 2021

Personal information
- Full name: Thomas Korsgaard Mikkelsen
- Date of birth: 27 August 1983 (age 43)
- Place of birth: Munkebo, Denmark
- Height: 1.90 m (6 ft 3 in)
- Position: Goalkeeper

Team information
- Current team: Silkeborg
- Number: 30

Senior career*
Years	Team	Apps	(Gls)
1998–2006	B.1909		
2006–2008	FC Fyn	65	(0)
2008–2009	Næsby	15	(0)
2009–2016	Vestsjælland	182	(0)
2016–2017	Fredericia	46	(0)
2017–2018	OB	0	(0)
2018	→ Lyngby (loan)	12	(0)
2019–2021	Lyngby	87	(0)
2021–2026	Brøndby	15	(0)
2026–	Silkeborg	0	(0)
- * Club domestic league appearances and goals as of 10 December 2025

Thomas Korsgaard Mikkelsen (Danish pronunciation: [ˈme̝kl̩sn̩]; born 27 August 1983) is a Danish professional footballer who plays as a goalkeeper for Danish Superliga club Silkeborg.

== Club career ==
=== Early years ===
Mikkelsen started out his career on Funen, playing for local lower division clubs B 1909, FC Fyn, and Næsby between 1998 and 2009.

=== Vestsjælland ===
On 17 June 2009, Mikkelsen was announced as the new goalkeeper of newly promoted Danish second tier club FC Vestsjælland. He became the starting goalkeeper for Vestsjælland, and signed a one-year contract extension on 8 July 2011. Six months later Mikkelsen signed another contract extension, this time a two-year deal, keeping him a part of the club until at least 2014. He continued as starting goalkeeper after head coach Ove Pedersen was appointed as replacement for the sacked Michael Schjønberg, and despite a weak start under the new coach results quickly improved. On 16 May 2013, Vestsjælland promoted to the Danish Superliga after a 0–0 draw home against Hobro IK.

On 21 July 2013, Mikkelsen made his first Superliga-appearance in a match against Brøndby which ended in a 1–1 draw. He was a key part of the team that survived the struggle against relegation during the 2013–14 season. The following season, however, Vestsjælland suffered relegation, ending on 11th place in the league table.

A few months later, Vestsjælland went bankrupt after a longer period of financial troubles. This effectively made Mikkelsen a free agent. He ended his tenure with Vestsjælland with 182 league appearances.

=== Fredericia ===
Mikkelsen subsequently signed a one-and-a-half-year contract with FC Fredericia. Here, he was announced as the starting goalkeeper and made his first appearance in a 1–0 away win over Silkeborg IF in the Danish second tier on 10 March. In his two seasons in Fredericia, Mikkelsen made 46 league appearances.

=== OB ===
On 30 March 2017, Danish Superliga club OB announced that Mikkelsen would join the first team on free transfer beginning on 1 July. He signed a two-year contract. Mikkelsen was signed as a backup to starting goalkeeper Sten Grytebust.

=== Lyngby ===
After being benched for a season, Mikkelsen was loaned out to Lyngby Boldklub on a six-month deal on 1 September 2018. This deal was made permanent on 9 January 2019, as he signed a one-and-a-half-year contract with Lyngby. With Mikkelsen on goal, Lyngby reached promotion to the Danish Superliga.

=== Brøndby ===
After Lyngby suffered relegation to the second tier after the 2020–21 season, Mikkelsen signed with defending Danish champions Brøndby IF, joining them from 1 July 2021. Featuring as the backup to Mads Hermansen, Mikkelsen made his debut in goal on 23 September in a 8–1 win over Allerød FK in the Danish Cup. His league debut for Brøndby followed on 17 October in a 3–2 win against Vejle after starter Hermansen suffered an injury. He would also make his European debut during Hermansen's absence, playing the UEFA Europa League group stage match against Rangers, which ended in a 2–0 loss.

After Hermansen was sold to EFL Championship club Leicester City, Mikkelsen assumed the role of starter early in the 2023–24 season. His performances were solid, notably earning him a man-of-the-match award in a 2–1 victory against Silkeborg on 23 July 2023. However, he eventually lost his starting place when Patrick Pentz joined the team on a season-long loan from Bayer Leverkusen in August 2023.

On 29 May 2026, Brøndby announced that Mikkelsen would leave the club on the expiry of his contract at the end of the 2025–26 season. The decision was the club's; Mikkelsen, who at 42 had sought a further extension, said he was disappointed but did not intend to retire. A backup during his stint at the club, and therefore rarely a first-choice selection, he made 22 appearances across five seasons and became a popular figure with the club's supporters.

=== Silkeborg ===
On 2 September 2026, Danish Superliga club Silkeborg announced the signing of Mikkelsen on a free transfer.

== International career ==
In November 2020, at the age of 37, he was called up to Kasper Hjulmand's senior squad for the friendly against Sweden due to several cancellations from, among others, the Danish national team players playing in England, due to the COVID-19 restrictions, as well as a case of COVID-19 in the squad, which had put several national team players in quarantine. He was on the bench for the game against Sweden.
