= Jonathan Ægidius =

Danish footballer (born 2002)

Personal information
- Full name: Jonathan Risbjerg Ægidius
- Date of birth: 22 April 2002 (age 24)
- Place of birth: Slangerup, Denmark
- Height: 1.90 m (6 ft 3 in)
- Position: Goalkeeper

Team information
- Current team: Lyngby
- Number: 1

Youth career
- 2008–2011: SOIF
- 2011–2016: Nordsjælland
- 2016–2021: Lyngby
- 2021–2022: Brøndby

Senior career*
Years	Team	Apps	(Gls)
2021–2025	Brøndby	0	(0)
2022	→ HIK (loan)	3	(0)
2024	→ Kolding (loan)	8	(0)
2025–	Lyngby	36	(0)

International career
2018	Denmark U16	3	(0)
2018–2019	Denmark U17	11	(0)
2019–2020	Denmark U18	4	(0)
2020	Denmark U19	2	(0)
2022	Denmark U20	1	(0)
- * Club domestic league appearances and goals as of 2 June 2026

Jonathan Risbjerg Ægidius (born 22 April 2002) is a Danish professional footballer who plays as a goalkeeper for Danish Superliga club Lyngby Boldklub.

== Career ==
=== Youth years ===
Ægidius began his football journey at the local club Slangerup & Omegn IF in 2008, where he played until 2011 before moving to FC Nordsjælland. In the winter of 2016, Ægidius transferred from Nordsjælland to Lyngby Boldklub.

At Lyngby, Ægidius became part of the club's academy and over the years featured for all youth national teams. On 11 November 2020, the 18-year-old made his debut for Lyngby's first team in a Danish Cup match against Slagelse B&I, coming on as a substitute for Frederik Schram in the 73rd minute of the 9–0 victory.

=== Brøndby ===
On 25 January 2021, Ægidius signed a four-year pre-contract with Brøndby IF, which meant he would move from Lyngby to Brøndby on a free transfer in the summer of 2021, when his contract with Lyngby expired. A few days later, on 1 February 2021, the clubs agreed that Ægidius would transfer immediately.

In his first one and a half seasons at Brøndby, Ægidius primarily played for the club's U-19 team. In pursuit of senior experience, he was loaned out to the Danish 2nd Division club HIK on 18 July 2022 until the end of the season. Ægidius made his debut for HIK on 6 August 2022 against BK Frem. He went on to play two more matches, receiving a red card after an hour in the last game, before being recalled by Brøndby on 29 August 2022 due to injuries in their squad.

After being recalled, Ægidius continued as the third-choice goalkeeper at Brøndby and made only a few appearances for the club's reserve team that season. Nevertheless, in July 2023, he signed a contract extension with Brøndby until June 2027.

In July 2024, still awaiting his debut for Brøndby, Ægidius was loaned out to the Danish 1st Division club Kolding IF for the 2024–25 season. However, he was recalled at the end of 2024, after 11 games for Kolding.

=== Return to Lyngby ===
On 3 February 2025, Ægidius returned to Lyngby Boldklub, signing a contract until June 2028. On 21 March 2025, Ægidius got his Lyngby- and Danish Superliga debut, when he was in the starting lineup against Viborg FF.

== Honours ==
Lyngby

- Danish 1st Division: 2025–26
