= Jesper Sørensen =

Danish football manager (born 1973)

Personal information
- Date of birth: 10 June 1973 (age 53)
- Place of birth: Aarhus, Denmark
- Height: 1.77 m (5 ft 10 in)
- Position: Midfielder

Team information
- Current team: Vancouver Whitecaps (manager)

Youth career
- 1983–1990: AGF

Senior career*
Years	Team	Apps	(Gls)
1988	Adelaide City	10	(0)
1991–1995	AGF	46	(1)
1995	→ Ikast FS (loan)		
1995–1997	FC Copenhagen	37	(3)
1997–1999	AGF	48	(2)
1999–2004	AB	116	(3)
2004–2006	AGF	63	(0)

International career
1988–1989	Denmark U17	20	(0)
1991–1992	Denmark U19	5	(0)
1992–1995	Denmark U21	5	(0)

Managerial career
- 2013–2014: Silkeborg
- 2015–2018: Fredericia
- 2021–2023: Denmark U21
- 2023–2024: Brøndby
- 2025–: Vancouver Whitecaps
- * Club domestic league appearances and goals

Jesper Sørensen (born 10 June 1973) is a Danish professional football coach and former player. He is the manager of Major League Soccer club Vancouver Whitecaps FC.

== Career ==
Sørensen previously played football as a midfielder for Adelaide City, FC Copenhagen, Ikast FS, AB and AGF.

In the summer of 2009, he became assistant coach at AGF – a position he held until 2013, when he became head coach of Silkeborg IF. However, after registering a record low number of points in the Superliga, Sørensen was sacked on 8 December 2014.

On 18 August 2021, he was announced as the new manager of the Danish under-21 national team, although he kept serving as the assistant coach at Brøndby IF until the end of the same year.

Under Sørensen's tenure, Denmark reached the qualification play-offs for the 2023 UEFA European Under-21 Championship, even though they eventually lost to Croatia over two legs. Despite that, in December 2022 the coach (as well as his assistant, Steffen Højer), renewed his contract with the Federation until 2024.

Just a month after renewing his contract, Sørensen left the Danish U-21 team to become manager of his former club Brøndby IF in January 2023. In his first half-season, he guided the club to a 5th place in the Danish Superliga. In his first full season, Brøndby was on route to take the Danish championship, but lost in the last round, when the club lost 2-3 to AGF Aarhus. On 11 December 2024, Sørensen was sacked by Brøndby with the club in 5th place in the Danish Superliga.

Sørensen was appointed head coach for Canadian Major League Soccer club Vancouver Whitecaps FC on 14 January 2025.

== Managerial statistics ==
As of matches played on 7 November 2026

Managerial record by team and tenure
Team	Nat	From	To	Record								Ref
Team	Nat	From	To	G	W	D	L	GF	GA	GD	Win %	Ref
Silkeborg	(Denmark)	1 July 2013	8 December 2014	55	23	10	22	90	68	+22	41.82	
Fredericia	(Denmark)	10 December 2015	30 June 2018	89	35	23	31	128	118	+10	39.33	
Denmark U21	(Denmark)	1 September 2021	2 January 2023	13	7	4	2	21	12	+9	53.85	
Brøndby	(Denmark)	2 January 2023	11 December 2024	73	37	17	19	138	91	+47	50.68	
Vancouver; Whitecaps	(Canada)	14 January 2025	present	96	46	27	23	185	113	+72	47.92	
Career total				326	148	81	97	562	402	+160	45.40	—

== Honours ==
=== Manager ===
Vancouver Whitecaps

- Canadian Championship: 2025
- Western Conference (playoffs): 2025
