= List of archaeology journals =

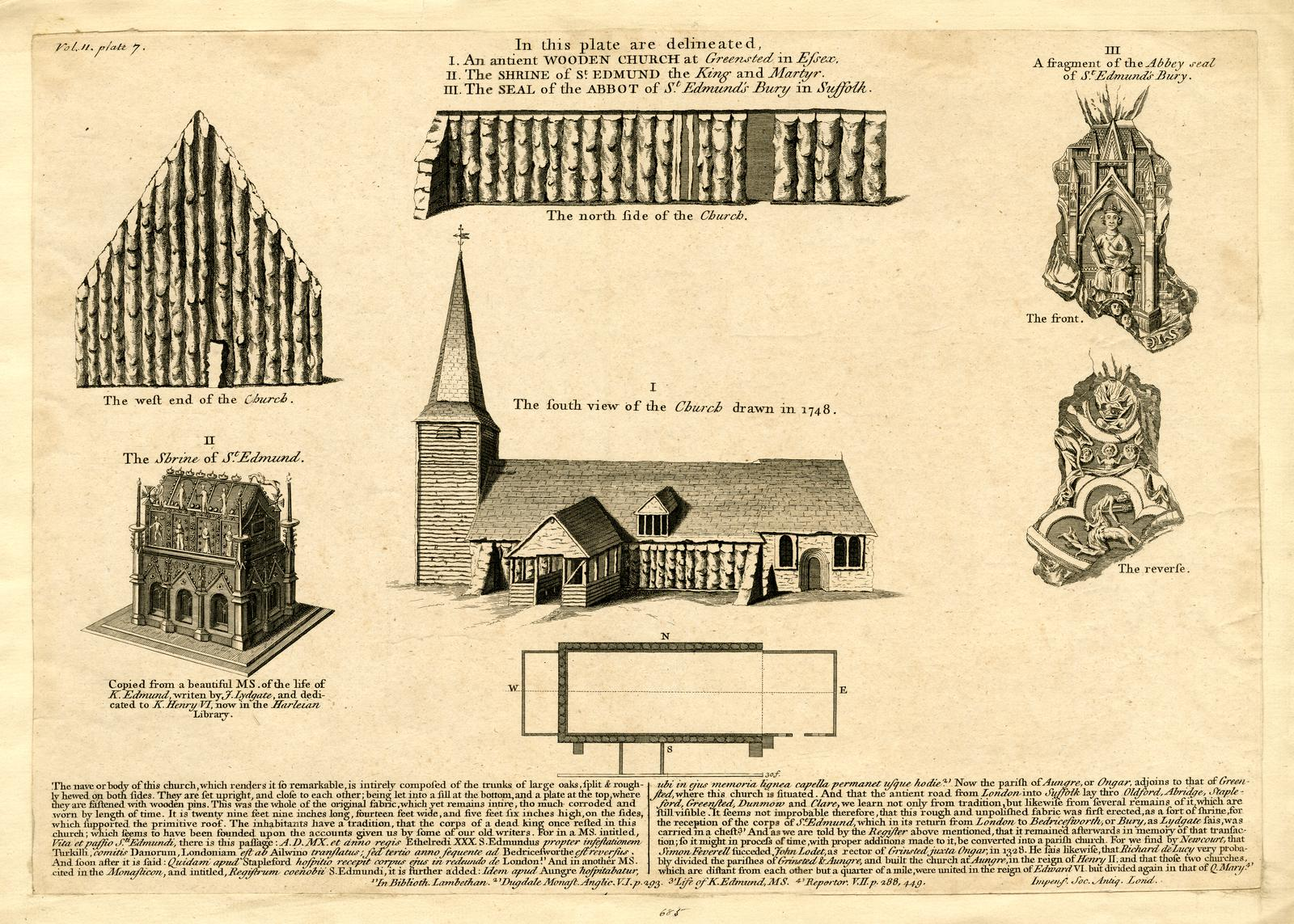
Plate from the second volume of Vetusta Monumenta, published c. 1751.

This page contains a list of academic journals covering archaeology, the study of the human past through material remains. It includes both active periodicals and those that have ceased publication.

Before the advent of the modern journal format, the Society of Antiquaries of London published Vetusta Monumenta, a series of illustrated folios on antiquarian studies which appeared at irregular intervals between 1718 and 1909. Beginning in 1770, papers delivered at the society's meetings were also published in quarto format in Archaeologia (last published in 2007), and from 1843 in the Proceedings of the Society of Antiquaries of London, which is still published today under the title Antiquaries Journal. Other early archaeological journals that are still active include The Archaeological Journal and La Revue Archéologique, both first published in 1844, Archaeologia Cambrensis, published by the Cambrian Archaeological Association since 1846, and Sussex Archaeological Collections, published by the Sussex Archaeological Society since 1848.

Apart from the dedicated academic publications listed here, scholarship in archaeology is also published in general-purpose scientific journals such as Science or Nature, and in semi-scholarly periodicals such as Archaeology, Discover, National Geographic, or Scientific American. In North America, archaeology is considered one of the four subfields of anthropology, so papers on archaeology are often published in general anthropology journals, for example American Anthropologist or Current Anthropology. Environmental archaeology is often published in multi-disciplinary environmental science journals, such as Quaternary International or The Holocene, or less commonly, in ecology or development studies journals.

Archaeology journals are dominated by men. Across publications, there are two to three times more papers by male authors than by women. Many archaeology journals also show a gender citation gap: articles written by women are less likely to be cited, especially by men. Studies have generally shown that the imbalance in publication rates is because archaeology journals receive fewer submissions from women, rather than any detectable bias in the peer review processes. In recent years the number of women authors have increased but, as of 2020, gendered publication rates are not equal. As well as gender, archaeological publishing is also homogenous in terms of race, ethnicity and sexual orientation; more prestigious journals tend to be dominated by straight, white, cisgender men.

== Active publications ==
Title	Publisher	First published	Issues per year	Open access	ISSN
Acta Archaeologica	Wiley-Blackwell	1930	2	—	0065-101X (print); 1600-0390 (web)
Acta Archaeologica Sinica	Institute of Archaeology, Chinese Academy of Social Sciences	1936	4	—	0453-2902
Advances in Archaeological Practice	Cambridge University Press	2013	4	Yes	2326-3768
African Diaspora Archaeology Newsletter	African Diaspora Archaeology Network	1994	4	—	1933-8651
American Antiquity	Cambridge University Press	1935	4	—	0002-7316
American Anthropologist	Wiley	1888	4	—	
American Journal of Archaeology	Archaeological Institute of America	1885	4	—	0002-9114 (print); 1939-828X (web)
Ancient Civilizations from Scythia to Siberia	Brill	1995	6	—	0929-077X (print); 1570-0577 (web)
Ancient Mesoamerica	Cambridge University Press	1990	3	—	
Antiguo Oriente	Pontifical Catholic University of Argentina	2003	—	—	1667-9202
Antiquity	Cambridge University Press	1927	6	Hybrid	0003-598X (print); 1745-1744 (web)
Annual Review of Anthropology	Annual Reviews	1972	1	—	
Arabian Archaeology and Epigraphy	Wiley-Blackwell	1990	2	—	0905-7196 (print); 1600-0471 (web)
Archaeologia Cambrensis	Cambrian Archaeological Association	1846	1	—	ISSN 0306-6924
Archaeologia Cantiana	Kent Archaeological Society	1858	1	Delayed	ISSN 0066-5894
Archaeologia Polona	Polish Academy of Sciences	1958	1	—	0066-5924
Archaeological Dialogues	Cambridge University Press	1994	2	Yes	1478-2294
The Archaeological Journal	Taylor & Francis	1844	1	—	0066-5983
Archaeological Papers of the American Anthropological Association	Wiley	1989	1	—	
Archaeological Review from Cambridge	—	1981	2	—	0261-4332
Archaeologies	Springer	2005	3	—	
Archaeology, Ethnology & Anthropology of Eurasia	Elsevier	2000	4	Delayed	1563-0110 (print); 1531-832X (web)
Archaeology International	UCL Press	1954	1	Yes	2048-4194
Archaeology in Oceania	Wiley-Blackwell	1966	3	—	0003-8121 (print); 1834-4453 (web)
Archaeometry	Wiley-Blackwell	1958	—	Hybrid	0003-813X (print); 1475-4754 (web)
Archéologie du Midi Médiéval	Centre d'Archéologie Médiévale du Languedoc	1983	1	—	0758-7708 (print); 2275-4865 (web)
Archeologia e Calcolatori	Consiglio Nazionale delle Ricerche	1990	1	Yes	1120-6861 (print); 2385-1953 (web)
Archeologia Medievale	—	—	1	—	0390-0592
ArcheoSciences	Presses Universitaires de Rennes	1977	2	Yes	2104-3728
Archivos do Museu Nacional	National Museum of Brazil	1876	4	—	0365-4508
The Artefact	Archaeological and Anthropological Society of Victoria	1970	2	—	0044-9075
Asian Perspectives	University of Hawaiʻi Press	1957	2	—	0066-8435 (print); 1535-8283 (web)
Australian Archaeology	Australian Archaeological Association	1974	3	—	0312-2417 (print); 2470-0363 (web)
Brycheiniog	Brecknock Society and Museum Friends	1955	1	—	—
Bulletin d'archéologie marocaine	National Institute of Archaeological and Heritage Sciences (Morocco)	1956	1	Yes	0068-4015
Bulletin of the History of Archaeology	Ubiquity Press	1991	2	Yes	1062-4740
Cambridge Archaeological Journal	Cambridge University Press	1991	3	—	0959-7743
Current Anthropology	University of Chicago Press	1959	6	—	
Cretica Chronica	Society of Cretan Historical Studies	1947	1	—	0454-5206
Dacia	Vasile Pârvan Institute of Archaeology	1924	—	—	0070-251X
Damqatum	Pontifical Catholic University of Argentina	—	1	—	1852-6594
Danish Journal of Archaeology	Routledge	1982	—	Yes	2166-2282 (print); 2166-2290 (web)
Dendrochronologia	Elsevier	—	—	—	1125-7865
Environmental Archaeology	Maney Publishing	1996	2	—	1461-4103 (print); 1749-6314 (web)
Epigraphia Zeylanica	Sri Lankan Department of Archaeology	1904	—	—	—
Estudios Atacameños	Catholic University of the North	1973	2	—	0716-0925 (print); 0718-1043 (web)
European Journal of Post-Classical Archaeologies	Società Archeologica	2011	—	Hybrid	2039-7895
Fornvännen	Royal Swedish Academy of Letters, History and Antiquities	1906	4	Delayed	0015-7813 (print); 1404-9430 (web)
Forum Kritische Archäologie	Institute for Near Eastern Archaeology	2012	4	Yes	2194-346X
Gallia Préhistoire	CNRS Éditions	1958	1	Yes	0016-4127 (print); 2109-9642 (web)
Geoarchaeology	Wiley	1986	6	Hybrid	1520-6548
Gnomon	C. H. Beck	1925	8	—	0017-1417
Hesperia	American School of Classical Studies at Athens	1932	4	—	0018-098X (print); 1553-5622 (web)
Historical Archaeology	Springer	1967	4	—	
IA	Society for Industrial Archeology	1975	2	—	0160-1040
Industrial Archaeology Review	Taylor & Francis	1976	2	Hybrid	0309-0728 (print); 1745-8196 (web)
International Journal of Historical Archaeology	Springer	1997	4	—	1092-7697 (print); 1573-7748 (web)
International Journal of South American Archaeology	Syllaba Press	—	2	—	2011-0626
Internet Archaeology	Council for British Archaeology	1996	—	Yes	1363-5387
Israel Exploration Journal	Israel Exploration Society	1950	2	—	—
Journal of African Archaeology	Brill	2003	2	Delayed (3 years)	1612-1651 (print); 2191-5784 (web)
Journal of Ancient History	—	1937	4	—	—
Journal of Anthropological Archaeology	Elsevier	1982	4	—	0278-4165
Journal of Anthropological Research	University of Chicago Press	1937	4	—	
Journal of Archaeological Method and Theory	Springer	1978	4	Hybrid	1072-5369 (print); 1573-7764 (web)
Journal of Archaeological Research	Springer	1993	4	—	
Journal of Archaeological Science	Elsevier	1974	12	Hybrid	0305-4403 (print); 1095-9238 (web)
Journal of Conservation and Museum Studies	Ubiquity Press	1996	—	Yes	1364-0429
Journal of Eastern Mediterranean Archaeology and Heritage Studies	The Pennsylvania State University Press	2013	4	—	2166-3548 (print); 2166-3556 (web)
Journal of Cultural Heritage	Elsevier	2000	6	Hybrid	1296-2074 (print); 1778-3674 (web)
Journal of Field Archaeology	Routledge	1974	8	Hybrid	0093-4690 (print); 2042-4582 (web)
Journal of Indo-European Studies	Institute for the Study of Man	1973	4	—	0092-2323
Journal of Late Antique, Islamic and Byzantine Studies	Edinburgh University Press	2022	1	Yes	2634-2367 (print); 2634-2375 (web)
Journal of Open Archaeology Data	Ubiquity Press	2012	1	Yes	2049-1565
Journal of Roman Archaeology	Cambridge University Press	1988	1	—	1047-7594 (print); 2331-5709 (web)
Journal of Social Archaeology	SAGE	2001	3	—	1469-6053 (print); 1741-2951 (web)
Journal of Swiss Archaeology and Art History	Swiss National Museum	1939	4	Delayed (2 years)	0044-3476 (print); 2296-5971 (web)
Journal of the Iowa Archeological Society	Iowa Archeological Society	—	—	—	—
Journal of the North Atlantic	Eagle Hill	2008	1	—	1935-1933
Kaogu	Institute of Archaeology, Chinese Academy of Social Sciences	1934	12	—	0453-2899
Latin American Antiquity	Society for American Archaeology	1990	—	—	1045-6635 (print); 2325-5080 (web)
Levant	Council for British Research in the Levant	1968	3	—	1756-3801
Medieval Archaeology	Society for Medieval Archaeology	1957	2	Hybrid	0076-6097 (print); 1745-817X (web)
Mesolithic Miscellany	University of York	1980	1	Yes	0259-3548
Ñawpa Pacha	Institute of Andean Studies	1963	2	—	0077-6297 (print); 2051-6207 (web)
Near East Archaeological Society Bulletin	Near East Archaeological Society	1958	1	—	0739-0068
Near Eastern Archaeology	American Schools of Oriental Research	1998	4	—	2325-5404 (print); 1094-2076 (web)
Norwegian Archaeological Review	Routledge	1968	2	—	0029-3652 (print); 1502-7678 (web)
Old Kilkenny Review	Kilkenny Archaeological Society	1948	1	—	0332-0774
Ostraka	Loffredo	1992	1	—	1122-259X
Oxford Journal of Archaeology	School of Archaeology, University of Oxford	1982	4	—	0262-5253 (print); 1468-0092 (web)
Paléorient	CNRS Éditions	1973	2	Delayed (2 years)	1957-701X (print); 1957-701X (web)
Palestine Exploration Quarterly	Palestine Exploration Fund	1865	4	Hybrid	0031-0328 (print); 1743-1301 (web)
Papers from the Institute of Archaeology	UCL Press	1990	1	Yes	2041-9015
The Post Hole	University of York	2008	12	Yes	2052-0778 (print); 2051-9745 (web)
Post-Medieval Archaeology	Taylor & Francis	1967	2	Hybrid	0079-4236 (print); 1745-8137 (web)
Public Archaeology	Maney	2000	4	—	1465-5187 (print); 1753-5530 (web)
Pyrenae	University of Barcelona	1965	2	—	0079-8215 (print); 2339-9171 (web)
Quaternary Science Reviews	Elsevier	1982	24	—	0277-3791
Revue Archéologique	—	1844	2	—	—
Revue du Nord	—	1910	—	—	1166-486X (print); 0035-2624 (web)
Rock Art Research	International Federation of Rock Art Organizations	1984	2	—	0813-0426
Rossiyskaya arkheologiya	Nauka	1957	4	—	0869-6063
Scottish Archaeological Journal	Edinburgh University Press	1859	—	—	1471-5767 (print); 1755-2028 (web)
Southeastern Archaeology	Taylor & Francis	1982	2	—	0734-578X (print); 2168-4723 (web)
Surrey Archaeological Collections	Surrey Archaeological Society	1858	1	Delayed	0309-7803
Sussex Archaeological Collections	Sussex Archaeological Society	1848	1	Delayed	0143-8204
Tel Aviv	Taylor & Francis	1974	2	Hybrid	0334-4355 (print); 2040-4786 (web)
Wiltshire Archaeological and Natural History Magazine	Wiltshire Archaeological and Natural History Society	1854	1		0262-6608
World Archaeology	Routledge	1969	4	—	0043-8243 (print); 1470-1375 (web)

== Defunct publications ==
Title	Publisher	First published	Last published	ISSN
Ancient India	Archaeological Survey of India	1946	1966	—
Dialektikê	Centre de palethnographie stratigraphique d'Arudy	1973	1987	1169-0046
Epigraphia Indica	Archaeological Survey of India	1888	1977	0013-9564
Greater Manchester Archaeological Journal	Greater Manchester Archaeological Unit	1985	1988	0953-0304
The Indian Antiquary	Bombay Education Society	1872	1971	0019-4395
Present Pasts	Ubiquity Press	2009	2020	1759-2941
Publications du Service des Antiquités du Maroc	Service des Antiquités du Maroc	1935	1954	—
Trowel	University College Dublin	1988	2018	0791-1017
Vetusta Monumenta	Society of Antiquaries of London	1718	1906	—

== See also ==
- Category:Archaeology journals
- Lists of academic journals
