= Ancient Near East studies =

Ancient Near East studies (or ANE studies) is the field of academic study of the ancient Near East (ANE). As such, it is an umbrella term for Assyriology and Egyptology. Alongside its sister subject of Near Eastern Archaeology, it is among the most prominent fields with regard to research in the realm of ancient history, alongside such disciplines as Classics, Classical Archaeology, Biblical Studies, Biblical Archaeology, Jewish Studies, Christian Studies, Iranology, Sinology, and Indology, some of which it overlaps with.

== History of ANE studies ==
In Britain the first Assyriological appointments in the University of London date to 1904, when T. G. Pinches of the British Museum was appointed to a professorship.

=== Societies ===
- American Oriental Society
- ARAM – ARAM Society for Syro-Mesopotamian Studies
- ASOR – American Schools of Oriental Research, Boston
- British Institute for the Study of Iraq
- CEHAO – Centro de Estudios de Historia del Antiguo Oriente, Argentina
- Council for British Research in the Levant
- Deutsche Orient-Gesellschaft
- The Melammu Project The Assyrian and Babylonian Intellectual Heritage Project, Helsinki.
- Royal Asiatic Society of Great Britain and Ireland
- Société Asiatique, Paris
- Open Digital Ancient Near Eastern Studies (OpenDANES)

== Universities with major ANE centres ==
- Pontifical Catholic University of Argentina
- University of Chicago Oriental Institute
- Columbia University
- New York University Institute for Study of the Ancient World

== Common abbreviations of cited journals, sources and lexicons ==
The following list does not include journals in the field of Old Testament studies.

- Abzu – Bibliography From the Oriental Institute of the University of Chicago
- Ancient Near East Monographs (ANEM)
- ANES – Ancient Near Eastern Studies Annual journal from the University of Melbourne dedicated to the languages and cultures of the ancient Near East.
- ANET & ANEP – Ancient Near East Texts (Princeton 1950, 1955, 3rd ed. 1969)
- AntOr – Antiguo Oriente
- BASOR – Bulletin of the American Schools of Oriental Research
- CAD – Chicago Assyrian Dictionary
- CHD – Chicago Hittite Dictionary
- ETANA – Electronic Tools and Ancient Neareastern Archives
- ETCSL – Electronic Text Corpus of Sumerian Literature, Oxford
- JEOL – Jaarbericht Ex Oriente Lux
- JESHO – Journal of the Economic and Social History of the Orient
- JCS – Journal of Cuneiform Studies
- JNES – Journal of Near Eastern Studies
- JSS – Journal of Semitic Studies
- KTU² - Keilschrift Texte aus Ugarit
- LAPO – Littératures anciennnes du Proche-Orient 1967–2002
- NEA – Near Eastern Archaeology Magazine
- Revista del Instituto de Historia Antigua Oriental
- RLA – Reallexikon der Assyriologie
- TUAT – Texte aus der Umwelt des Alten Testament 1982–1995, 2002

== See also ==
- Chronology of the ancient Near East
- Genetic history of the Middle East
- Middle Eastern studies
- Quranic studies
- Religions of the ancient Near East / Middle Eastern mythology
