= Giampiero =

Giampiero (often Gianpiero or Gian Piero) is an Italian male given name.

== List of people ==
=== Giampiero ===
- Giampiero Albertini, Italian actor
- Giampiero Artegiani, Italian singer
- Giampiero Boniperti, Italian footballer
- Giampiero Catone, Italian politician
- Giampiero de Carli, Italian rugby player
- Giampiero Galeazzi, Italian rower
- Giampiero Pastore, Italian fencer
- Giampiero Pinzi, Italian footballer
- Giampiero Simoni, Italian racing driver

=== Gianpiero ===
- Gianpiero Combi, Italian footballer
- Gianpiero D'Alia, Italian politician
- Gianpiero Fiorani, Italian banker
- Gianpiero Lambiase, British-Italian racing engineer
- Gianpiero Marini, Italian footballer
- Gianpiero Moretti, Italian racing driver

=== Gian Piero ===
- Gian Pietro Brogiolo, Italian professor
- Gian Pietro Felisatti, Italian music producer
- Gian Pietro Ferretti, Italian bishop
- Gian Piero Gasperini, Italian footballer and manager
- Gian Piero Ghio, Italian footballer and manager
- Gian-Piero Meade, Italian cricketer
- Gian Piero Reverberi, Italian composer
- Gian-Piero Ringel, German film producer
- Gian Piero Ventura, Italian football manager
