= Archaeologia =

Archaeologia or Archæologia may refer to:

- Archaeologia Cambrensis, an archaeological and historical scholarly journal, published annually in Wales by the Cambrian Archaeological Association, containing excavation reports, book reviews, and historical essays. It also includes society notes and accounts of field visits
- Archaeologia Cantiana, an annual journal published by the Kent Archaeological Society on the archaeology and history of Kent
- Archaeologia (London), an international journal published by the Society of Antiquaries of London
- Archaeologia Scotica: Transactions of the Society of Antiquaries of Scotland
- Archaeologia Polona, a journal published in English annually since 1958 by the Institute of Archaeology and Ethnology of the Polish Academy of Sciences
