= Erik Kellerman Reed =

US National Park Service archaeologist (1914-1990)

Erik Kellerman Reed (August 16, 1914 – December 25, 1990), was an American archaeologist in the US National Park Service. He conducted his field work in the U.S. Southwest region, and much of his work focused on skeletal remains.

== Early life and education ==
Reed was born in Quincy, Massachusetts, on August 16, 1914, and grew up in Washington, D.C. with his family. He graduated from Washington Central High School. He graduated in 1932 from George Washington University with a B.A. in anthropology. Reed then received an M.A. from Harvard University in 1933 and worked on many excavations for the National Park Service as a seasonal ranger.

== Career ==
Reed was appointed as Regional Archaeologist for the National Park Service in 1939, and supervised excavations at Mancos Canyons, Colorado, for the Bureau of Indian Affairs.

In 1943 he volunteered as a sergeant in World War II, and served in the European Theater of Operations. During this time he was granted a Ph.D. from Harvard with his report on the Mancos Canyons as his dissertation titled "An Archaeological Study of Mancos Valley, Southwestern Colorado, and Its Position in the Prehistory of the American Southwest. After returning from army service in March 1946, he resumed his work as Regional Archaeologist until his retirement in 1970.

== Personal life ==
Reed married Dorothy Fisher in 1938, and they had a daughter and a son. They divorced in 1970. Later, he married Evelyn Dahl.

Reed died on December 25, 1990, at the St. Vincent hospital in Santa Fe, New Mexico, of complications from pneumonia.

== Honors ==
He served as President of the Society for American Archeology from 1960 to 1961, and received the Department of the Interior Distinguished Service Award. He also served on the Board of Trustees of the Archaeological Society of New Mexico. The Archaeological Society of New Mexico published a book of collected papers in his honor.

== Select publications ==
- Reed, Erik Kellerman. (1938). Archaeology of the Mimbres Valley, New Mexico. Central Texas Archaeologist (4): 9-20.
- Reed, Erik Kellerman (1952). The Tewa Indians of the Hopi Country. Plateau (25): 11-18.
- Reed, Erik Kellerman. (1966). Appendix 1: Human Skeletal Material from Tse-Ta'a. In Excavations at Tse-ta'a, Canyon de Chelly National Monument, Arizona, by C. R. Steen, pp. 123-129. National Park Service, Archaeological Research Series No. 9, Washington, D.C.
