= Ravn =

Scandinavian surname derived from Old Norse hrafn ("raven")

- Language: Danish, Norwegian

Origin
- Origin: Old Norse hrafn
- Meaning: Raven
- Region of origin: Scandinavia

Illustration of a Raven banner, a Viking symbol associated with Odin and victory in battle.

Ravn is a Scandinavian surname found mainly in Denmark and Norway, ultimately from the Old Norse noun hrafn (“raven”). In Viking Age Scandinavia, hrafn was a productive element in personal names and bynames associated with omen, warfare, and sacred knowledge; it is attested in runic inscriptions and saga literature.

== Etymology ==
Within Scandinavia in the Viking Age, the raven element hrafn is associated with warrior prestige, fate, and noble standing in saga and verse. Names and bynames formed on hrafn are widely attested in Icelandic and Norwegian sources and later gave rise to hereditary surnames such as Ravn in Denmark–Norway.

Runic inscriptions from the late Proto-Norse and Viking periods provide early evidence of hrafn as a name element, either as the standalone Hrafn or in compounds. A noted example is Hrafnkell (hrafn + ketill “cauldron/helmet”), preserved in the medieval Icelandic manuscript tradition of Hrafnkels saga.

Etymologically, the element continues the common Proto-Germanic lexeme *hrabnaz* “raven” "rauen", with early reflexes in Old English hræfn and Old High German hraban, and later Scandinavian forms in Danish/Norwegian ravn and Icelandic/Faroese hrafn.

== Historical usage ==
In Norse mythology, ravens are closely associated with Odin, whose birds Huginn and Muninn represent thought and memory. The bird is prominent in martial symbolism: raven banners—military standards bearing the raven—are reported for leaders including the sons of Ragnar Lodbrok and the army of Cnut the Great. In skaldic verse, raven-based kennings for battle and death are common, for example hrafn-fæðir (“feeder of ravens”) and hrafn-vín (“raven’s wine”).

== Variants and cognates ==
- Scandinavian: Ravn (Danish, Norwegian), Hrafn (Icelandic, Faroese; primarily a given name)
- Germanic cognates: German Rabe; English Raven (byname/surname); Old English hræfn; Old High German hraban.

== Geographic distribution ==
The surname is most common in Denmark and Norway, where it developed from older bynames during the late medieval and early modern periods.

== Notable people ==
- Anders P. Ravn (1947–2019), Danish computer scientist
- Allan Ravn
- Freja Ravn, Danish badminton player
- Fritz Ravn
- Henrik Ravn
- Jørgen Ravn
- Jørgen Ravn (gymnast)
- Kurt Ravn (born 1947), Danish singer and actor
- Lars Ravn
- Louise Ravn-Hansen
- Lucas Janus Ravn-Haren, or Lucas Haren
- Mads Ravn
- Marion Elise Ravn, better known as Marion Raven
- Mette Ravn
- Niels Frederik Ravn
- Olga Ravn
- Otto E. Ravn
- Palle Ravn
- Per Ravn Omdal
- Peter Ravn (artist) (born 1955), Danish painter
- Peter Ravn (speedway rider) (born 1962), Danish motorcycle speedway rider
- Petter Ravn
- Sander Ravn
- Simon Ravn
- Troels Ravn
- Wolff Ravn

== See also ==
- Hrafn (given name)
- Hrafnkels saga
- Raven banner
