= Droane =

Human settlement in Valvestino, Province of Brescia, Lombardy, Italy

Droane (pronounced Droàne) is a hamlet of Valvestino, to the valley in the province of Brescia, Lombardy, in northern Italy.

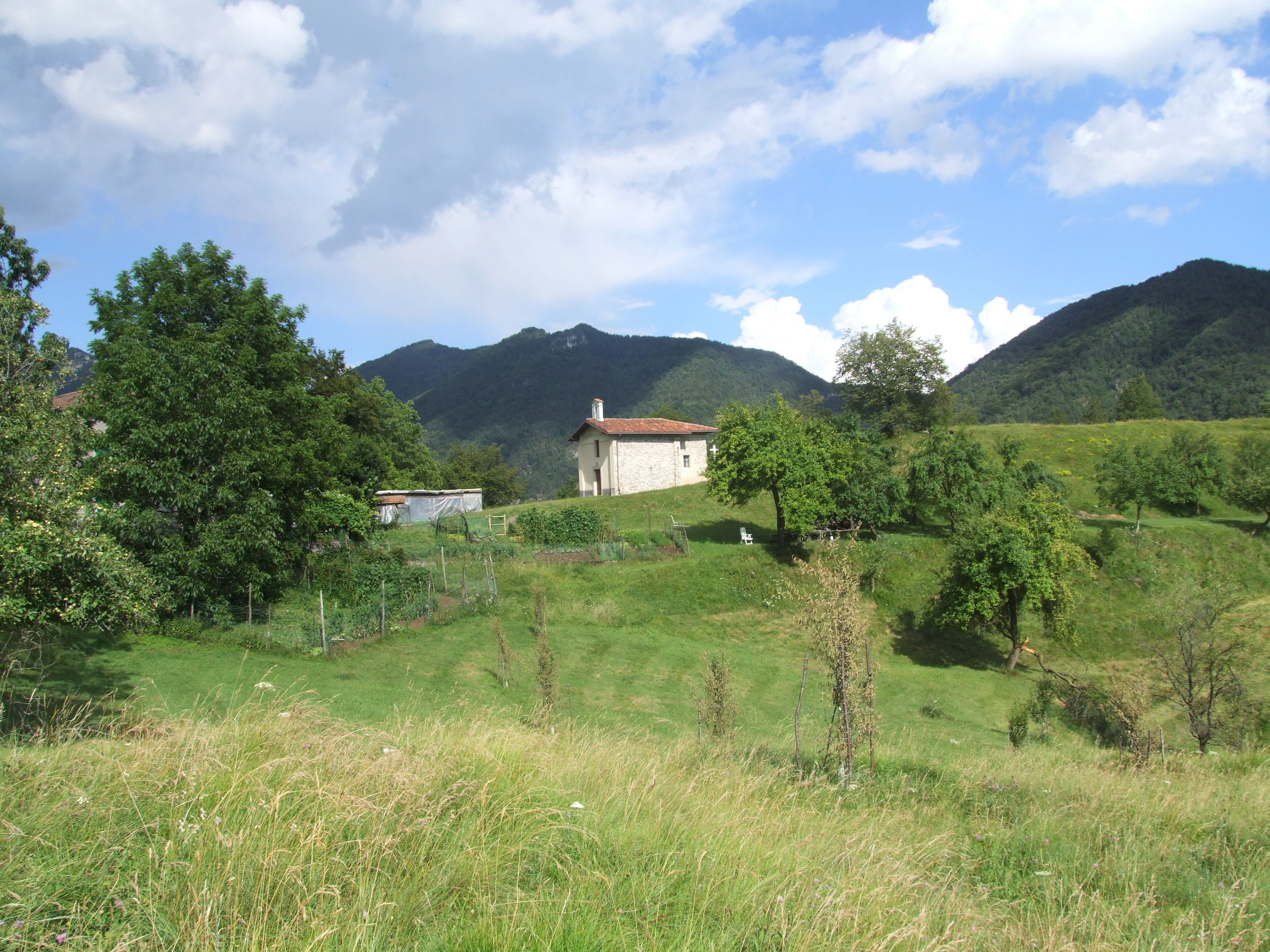
Church of Saint Vigilius of Trent

== Geography ==
Droane is the oldest settlement in the Val Vestino and was common until the 16th century, a period in which the population, according to local tradition, was decimated by the plague.

Located in the valley of Droanello Turano is about 6 km from the capital and is served by a road or electricity. The population consists of three people dedicated to the breeding of livestock.

== Toponymy ==
According to G.P. Brogiolo, professor of Medieval Archaeology at University of Padova, the name derives from the word of pre-Indo-European origin "dru" which means "steep rise".

== The patron ==
The patron saint of the village is Saint Vigilius of Trent that traditionally evangelized these areas. It is celebrated on June 26 with a distribution of bread according to the dictates of an ancient legacy. The church is named for the first time in the bull of Pope Urban III of 7 March 1186 and was visited by delegates of the bishop of Trent in 1750. Being unsafe was rebuilt in 1877 near the ancient. Nearby, on the hill of Saint Michael was the ancient church dedicated to the eponymous saint was destroyed with the abandonment of the country because of the plague of the 16th century.

== History ==
The discovery in the 1970s paleoanthropological remains of some human skeletons in one of the many caves in the area testify to the prehistoric frequenting the area.

The name of Droane is mentioned for the first time in the appointment of Pope Urban III of 7 March 1186. In the 17th century took refuge in a cave in the area with his gang, the notorious bandit John Beatrice, said Zanzanù, Gargnano Venetian hunted by the police for committing numerous crimes.

In July 1866 he was passed over by partisans of the 2nd Regiment of Volunteers and Italians alike in May 1915 by Italian soldiers of the 7th Regiment of sharpshooters.

In January 1992 the village was dangerously skirted by a forest fire.

The center of Droane, together with the whole Val Vestino, was placed at the boundary between the episcopal principality of Trento and the territory of the republic of Venice. During the 13th and 14th centuries was part of the possessions of the family Lodron. At the beginning of the 15th century, it is not possible to determine how the transition had occurred, was in possession of the town of Tignale.

Taking advantage of the dispute over possession of some sort between the towns of Droane Tignale, Gargnano and after a border demarcation signed in 1401, the Lodrons intromisero is the purpose of recovering the ancient feud, also establishing a territorial continuity in their domains, which at the time also included the nearby stronghold of Lake Garda Muslone.

In 1446 some residents of the town of Gargnano had tried to occupy by force and the Count Droane Lodron George, with his brother Peter, who tried to seize it. The prosecution cases before the administrator of Riva del Garda went on for two years. The Venetian Senate referred the matter to the rectors of Brescia, but only after eleven years, the dispute ended in 1469 with plotting.

== Bibliography ==
- G. Lonati, Di una controversia tra i conti di Lodrone ed il Comune di Tignale, in "Commentari dell'Ateneo di Brescia", 1932.
- Annalisa Colecchia, L'Alto Garda occidentale dalla preistoria al postmedioevo: archeologia ..., 2004.
- Archeologia medievale, pubblicato da Edizioni Clusf, 2002.
- Amato Amati, Dizionario corografico dell'Italia, 1868.

== Coordinates ==
45°0′46″N 10°36′0″E
