= Heather Lechtman =

American materials scientist and archaeologist

Heather Lechtman is an American materials scientist and archaeologist, and Director at the Center for Materials Research in Archaeology and Ethnology (CMRAE) at the Massachusetts Institute of Technology. She specializes in prehistoric technology of the Andean area of South America, and in particular metallurgy.

== Career ==
Lechtman graduated from Vassar College with an AB in Physics, and went on to work at the Sloan Kettering Institute for Cancer Research (1956-1960), the American Institute of Physics (1960-1962), and Brookhaven National Laboratory (1963-1964). In 1966 she received an MA in Fine Arts and Archaeology at New York University. She then became a research associate at the Massachusetts Institute of Technology in 1967, and a professor in Materials Science and Engineering there in 1974. Her research has demonstrated the development and spread of metallurgical technologies in the Andean region, and in particular the use of bronze alloys such as arsenic bronze.

== Awards ==
- 1984 MacArthur Fellows Program
- Dumbarton Oaks Fellow
- Pomerance Award for Scientific Contributions to Archaeology (2020)

== Works ==
- "The Inka, and Andean Metallurgical Tradition." In Variations in the Expression of Inka Power, R. Matos, R. Burger, C. Morris, eds., 2007, Washington, D.C.: Dumbarton Oaks, pp. 323–365.
- Esferas de Interacción Prehistóricas y Fronteras Nacionales Modernas: Los Andes Sur Centrales, H. Lechtman, ed., 2006, Lima: Instituto de Estudios Peruanos.
- "La metalurgia del bronce en los Andes Sur Centrales: Tiwanaku y San Pedro de Atacama," with Andrew Macfarlane, Estudios Atacameños, 2005, 30: 7–27.
- "Arsenic Bronze at Pikillacta." In Pikillacta: The Wari Occupation of Cuzco. G. McEwan, ed., 2005, Iowa City: University of Iowa Press, pp. 131–146.
- "Tiwanaku Period (Middle Horizon) Bronze Metallurgy in the Lake Titicaca Basin." In Tiwanaku and its Hinterland, Vol 2, A. Kolata, ed., 2003, Washington, D.C.: Smithsonian Institution Press, pp. 404–434.
- Dorothy Hosler; Heather Lechtman; Olaf Holm (1990). Axe-monies and their relatives. Dumbarton Oaks. ISBN 978-0-88402-185-8. "Heather Lechtman."
- Lechtmann, Heather; Hobbs, Linn (1986). "Roman Concrete and the Roman Architectural Revolution". In Kingery, W. D.; Lense, Esther (eds.). High-technology Ceramics: Past, Present, and Future : The Nature of Innovation and Change in Ceramic Technology. American Caeramic Society. pp. 81–128. ISBN 978-0-608-00723-6.
- Elizabeth P. Benson, ed. (1979). "Issues in Andean Metallurgy". Pre-Columbian metallurgy of South America. Dumbarton Oaks. ISBN 978-0-88402-094-3.
- Heather Lechtman; Lee Allen Parsons; William Jonathan Young (1975). Seven matched hollow gold jaguars from Peru's early horizon. Dumbarton Oaks. ISBN 978-0-88402-060-8. "Heather Lechtman."

== Quotes ==
How objects were made, what they were made of and how they were used, we see people making decisions at various stages, and the choices involve engineering as well as culture.

If people use materials in different ways in different societies, that tells you something about those people.

== See also ==
- Axe-monies
