= Alicia Daneri =

Argentine Egyptologist (born 1942)

- Born: Alicia Elena Daneri Rodrigo; 1942 (age 83–84); ARG
- Education: Universidad Nacional de La Plata Universidad de Buenos Aires
- Occupation: Egyptologist
- Employer: Centre of Studies of History of the Ancient East

Alicia Daneri Rodrigo (born 1942) is an Argentine Egyptologist who earned a doctorate at the Universidad de Buenos Aires.

== Career ==
Daneri graduated in History at the Universidad Nacional de La Plata. She completed a Master's Degree in Egyptology at the University of Toronto, Canada, and later a Doctorate at the Universidad de Buenos Aires. She was Professor of Ancient Near East history at the Universidad de la Plata and Buenos Aires. She has been a researcher at CONICET, deputy director of the Egyptology Studies Program and director of the Department of Egyptology at the Instituto Multidisciplinario de Historia y Ciencias Humanas (CONICET). From 2004 to 2009, she was Director of the Institute of Ancient Oriental History of the Faculty of Philosophy and Letters of the UBA and of her periodical publication RIHAO.

She has been a member of the group led by Professor Donald Redford (University of Toronto-Pennsylvania State University) and has participated in excavations in Egypt, in Karnak between 1989 and 1991, and on the site of Tel Rub'a, Mendes, between 1992 and 2005. Her research has focused on issues related to the archaeological material from the French-Argentine excavations in Aksha; with the exchange of goods between Egypt, the Eastern Mediterranean and other regions of the ancient world and with the ceramic material from the excavations in Tel Rub'a-Mendes.

Alicia Daneri is now honorary researcher at the Centre of Studies of History of the Ancient East of the Pontifical Catholic University of Argentina and former member of the editorial board of its journal Antiguo Oriente.

== Work ==
- "Las dinastías VII - VIII y el Período heracleopolitano en Egipto. Problemas de reconstrucción histórica de una época de crisis". Anexos de la Revista de estudios de Egiptología: Colección Estudios. Buenos Aires: PREDE. 1992.
- Relaciones de intercambio entre Egipto y el Mediterráneo Oriental (IV - I milenio a C.). Buenos Aires: Biblos. 2001.
- Campagno, M, ed. (2004). Antiguos contactos. Relaciones de intercambio entre Egipto y sus periferias. Buenos Aires: FFyL-UBA.
