= Mads Ravn =

Mads Ravn (born 21 October 1965) is head of archaeology, research and collections at the Vejle Museums in Denmark. He is also a member of the executive committee of the Kon-Tiki Museum in Oslo. He specialises in the archaeology of the Vikings and the Pacific Ocean.

== Selected publications ==
- "Analogy in Danish Prehistoric Studies", Norwegian Archaeological Review, Vol. 26, No. 2 (May 2010), pp. 59–75.
- "Ethnographic analogy from the Pacific: Just as analogical as any other analogy", World Archaeology, Vol. 43, No. 4 (December 2011), pp. 716–725.
- "Obsidian distribution from a Lapita cemetery sheds light on its value to past societies", Archaeology in Oceania, Vol. 50, No. 2, pp. 111–116.
- "Roads to complexity: Hawaiians and Vikings compared", Danish Journal of Archaeology, Vol. 7 (2018), No. 2. doi:10.1080/21662282.2018.1468147
