= Manousos Manousakas =

Greek historian, philologist and university teacher (1914–2003)

Manousos Ioannou Manousakas (Greek: Μανούσος Ιωάννου Μανούσακας; 3 December 1914 – 16 July 2003) was a Greek Byzantinist and Modern Greek scholar.

== Life ==
Manousakas was born in Rethymno, Greece to Ioannis Manousakas and Anna Petroulaki. His father was a lawyer who hailed from the villages of Argyroupoli and Imbros in Sfakia on his father's side. After attending high school in his home town, he studied at the Faculty of Philosophy of the University of Athens from 1932 to 1937. From 1938 to 1941 he was the secretary of the editorial committee of the Society for Cretan Studies. In 1942 he was appointed editor of the Medieval Archive, the later Research Center for the Medieval and Newer Greece of the Academy of Athens, and 1951 to 1961 its director.

From 1947 to 1951, he studied in Paris on a scholarship from the French Government. With another grant from the French National Centre for Scientific Research (CNRS), he attended courses at the Sorbonne and the École Pratique des Hautes Études to specialize in paleography and in the editing of ancient texts and prints. In March 1951 he received his doctorate with a dissertation entitled Contribution à l'histoire de l'épistolographie neo-hellénique as the best of his year at the Faculté des Lettres of the University of Paris. In March 1960 he published a second doctoral dissertation under the title The conspiracy of Sifis Vlastos on Crete (1453–1454) and the new conspiracy movement from 1460-1462 ("Η εν Κρήτη συνωμοσία του Σήφη Βλαστού (1453–1454) και η νέα συνωμοτική κίνησις του 1460–1462”) as the best of his class at the University of Thessaloniki.

In 1961 he was appointed to the Chair of Medieval and Modern History at the School of Philology of the University of Thessaloniki, where he taught until 1966. That year the Academy of Athens appointed him director of the Hellenic Institute of Byzantine and Post-Byzantine Studies in Venice, a post he held until 1982. From 1975 to 1980 he was director of the Center of Byzantine and Modern Greek Studies of the National Hellenic Research Foundation and from 1975 to 1981 Chairman of the Board of Directors of the then newly established University of Crete. In 1980 he was elected a corresponding member of the Academy of Athens, in 1982 he was elected a full member and in 1995 its chairman.

From 1962 to 1982 he published the journal Θησαυρίσματα (Thesaurismata) of the Hellenic Institute of Byzantine and Post-Byzantine Studies.

== Research focus ==
Manousakas' main areas of research were modern Greek epistolography (Frangiskos Skouphos, Greek: Φραγκίσκος Σκούφος), Byzantine and post-Byzantine history, in particular the period of Venetocracy and Cretan Renaissance literature (he discovered an unknown Cretan comedy titled The Forgotten Bride) and paleography (the 574 miniatures in the work of John Skylitzes) and edition philology.

== Awards ==
- 1960: Zappa Prize of the Association pour l'encouragement des études grecques en France
- 1980: Herder Prize from the University of Vienna
- Μέγας Υπομνηματογράφος (“Great Recorder”) conferred by the Ecumenical Patriarchate of Constantinople
- 1991: Honorary doctorate from the University of Bologna
- 1994: Gold Medal from the University of Crete
- 2001: Grand Commander of the Order of the Phoenix

== See also ==
- Conspiracy of Sifis Vlastos
