= Ravn (disambiguation) =

Ravn is a Scandinavian surname.

Ravn may also refer to:

- Ravn Aerospace, American defense contractor
- Ravn Alaska, former Alaskan airline
- Ravn oil field in the Danish sector of the North Sea
- Ravn Rock, South Shetland Islands, Antarctica
- Ravn Studio, Norwegian game development studio
- Ravn virus
