= Conspiracy of Sifis Vlastos =

The Conspiracy of Sifis Vlastos (Greek: Συνομωσία του Σήφη Βλαστού) was a fifteenth-century planned rebellion against the Republic of Venice in the overseas colony of Crete, named after its chief instigator. Vlastos and his collaborators were betrayed to the Venetian authorities, who swiftly arrested and executed them in 1454. A smaller, follow-on plan for an intended uprising against Venice was dismantled in 1462.

== Background ==
=== Crete under Venice ===
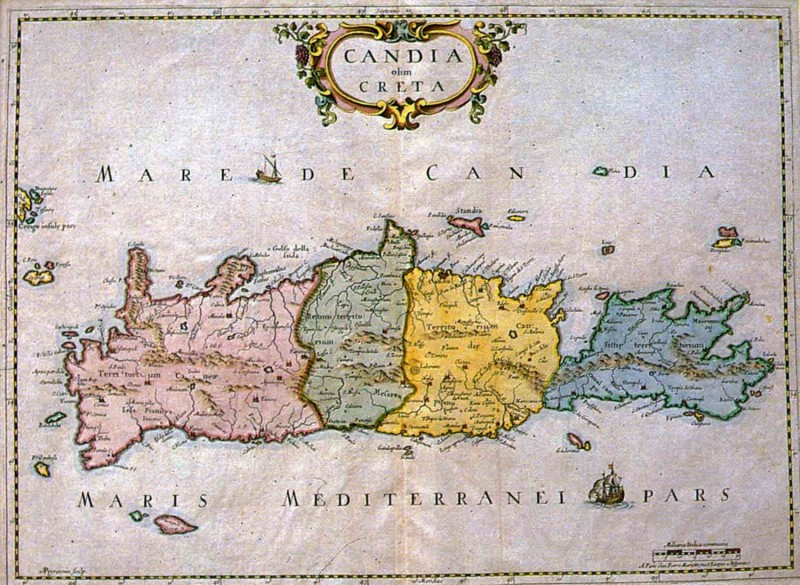
Venetian map of Crete.

Crete had been under Venetian rule since 1211, having been sold to Venice by Boniface of Montferrat at the time of the Fourth Crusade. Owing to its central location along the trade routes, its size and its products, Crete had a strategic importance for the Venetian rule in the Eastern Mediterranean. Occupied Crete was divided into fiefs and a colony known as the Kingdom of Candia (Italian: Regno di Candia) had been established, having as capital the city of Candia (present-day Heraklion). The land was distributed to Venetian colonists (both nobles and citizens) on the condition that they paid taxes, crewed Venetian warships and defended the possession in the name of Venice. Crete was governed by a Venetian noble elected by the Great Council of Venice, who bore the title of Duke of Candia and was assisted by two Councillors. Large cities were governed by Rectors who served under the Duke. Venetians ruled Crete primarily for their own interest, driving Cretans to forced labour or conscripting them for the wars of the Republic. During the five centuries of Venetian rule, Crete saw many rebellions by the native Cretan population against Venice.

=== Unification of the Catholic and Orthodox churches ===
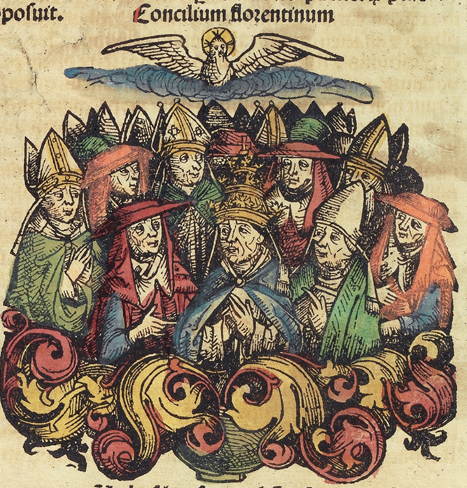
Depiction of the council of Florence.

In the early fifteenth century, the Byzantine Empire was on the verge of collapse due to the expansion of the Ottoman Turkish empire. Hoping to receive military assistance from the West, the Byzantine emperor John VIII Palaiologos was eager to form an alliance with the Latin Church. Hence, he arranged with Pope Eugene IV to hold discussions about reunion at the Council of Ferrara-Florence. After long negotiations and political pressure by the Byzantine Emperor, all Eastern bishopric representatives except Mark of Ephesus accepted Western doctrines such as Papal supremacy, Filioque and Purgatory, and in July 1439 signed a proclamation declaring the reunification of Latin and Eastern churches. However, upon returning to their home cities, Eastern bishops found that their agreement with the West was rejected by the populace and the vast majority of the low clergy. As a result, the union signed at Florence never came into effect. After the Fall of Constantinople two decades later, reunification became impossible as the Ottomans encouraged anti-unionists, aiming to keep Christianity divided.

=== Venetian Crete in the first half of the 15th century ===
Eastern Mediterranean c. 1450.

After the short-lived Commune of Crete which resulted from the failed revolt of Saint Titus in 1363 and the suppression of the subsequent Callergis rebellion in 1368, Crete enjoyed a fairly long period of peace. Although Venice allowed Orthodox Cretans to freely practice their faith according to the Byzantine Rite, she refused to accept the dependence of the Cretan Orthodox clergy to the Patriarchate of Constantinople. This was because Venice perceived the Orthodox faith of Cretans as an obstacle to her rule, hence wished to prevent any political intervention by the Byzantine ecclesiastical hierarchy. Instead, Latin bishops and the protopapades, officials loyal to the state were appointed to administer religious affairs in Crete. Absence of higher Orthodox clergy in Crete meant that Orthodox who wished to be ordained had to leave the island for Peloponnese or the Ionian Islands. To boost morale and strengthen faith, Orthodox bishops and exarchs arrived in Crete during the second half of the fourteenth and the first decades of the fifteenth century. These included figures such as the Archbishop of Athens Anthimos the Confessor and the monk Joseph Bryennios, who joined forces with local anti-unionist theologians such as Neilos Damilas and Joseph Filagris.

On the other hand, Pope Eugene IV sent to Crete archbishop Fantino Valaresso as his plenipotentiary, tasked with introducing the reforms needed to implement the union of the churches. Ecumenical Patriarchs such as Metrophanes II and his successor Gregory III encouraged the union and did not object to the Western involvement in Cretan ecclesiastical affairs, having accepted it as the price for the desperately needed help in confronting the Ottomans. In this setting, and from 1439 onwards, the religious policy of the Venetians aligned with that of the Holy See and sought to impose on Crete the terms of the Council of Ferrara-Florence. However, this was not welcome by the Cretans and increased the resentment of Venetian administration among them.

== Vlastos conspiracy ==
In the summer of 1454, soon after the fall of Constantinople on 29 May 1453, Venetian authorities were informed that a rebellion against the Republic was being prepared. Their informants were Ioannis Lima, a Cretan priest, and the Venetian Andrea Nigro, who pointed out Sifis Vlastos (Greek: Σήφης Βλαστός) as leader of the conspiracy. In search of support, the conspirators had approached Lima, who instead of helping them, informed the Venetian officials.

Sifis Vlastos (also Siphius or Sifi Vlasto) was a descendant of the Cretan noble Vlastos family, who resided in Rethymno. No further details are known about his life, however, it is conjectured that having conceived such a bold feat and having managed to gather a substantial number of followers, he must have been an important and influential person.

The objective of the conspiracy was most probably a reaction against the oppression of the Venetian rulers and the encroachment of the Catholic Church. It has also been suggested by modern historians that a more ambitious aim was to establish an independent Greek state, which would continue the legacy of the Byzantine Empire. This is further supported by the account of Andrea Cornaro, according to whom the conspirators aimed to cut the Venetian rulers in pieces and install another ruler. Furthermore, Venetian documents found by Manousos Manousakas mention that the conspirators had forged a letter of support from the Byzantine emperor Constantine XI Palaiologos.

Fearing that if Vlastos and his followers managed to ignite a rebellion, the military forces on Crete would be grossly outnumbered by the Cretans, the Venetian authorities under the Duke of Candia, Benedetto Vitturi, decided to act fast, without first consulting Doge Francesco Foscari. Thus, with the help of local feudatories, a total of 39 accomplices were arrested, among whom were the priests Manassis Arkoleon and Pavlos Kalyvas, and the civilians Leontakios Troulinos and Georgios Kallergis. The conspirators were executed by hanging, and their properties confiscated. Informants were given awards and hereditary annual subsidies that amounted to 1000 hyperpyra for each. They were also granted the right to be escorted by armed guards. Limas was offered the position of protopapas of Candia, but never occupied it in the fear of popular reaction. Offering material rewards in exchange of loyal services to Venice was a common practice of the Republic. As a further punishment, the Council of Ten forbade the ordination of Orthodox priests for five years and ordered the strengthening of the garrisons of Chania and Rethymno.

== The 1460–1462 conspiracy ==
Following the fall of Constantinople and the decline of the Despotate of the Morea, Orthodox priests and monks fled to Crete, strengthening the anti-unionist sentiment there. Religious tensions continued, as unionists such as the Latin Patriarch Isidore of Kiev had also arrived on the island. In early February 1460, proclamations against Venetian rule were thrown outside the home of the Cretan noble Ioannis Melissinos. Melissinos send them to the Rector of Rethymno, and in reprisal was killed in his sleep the following night. The Rector offered a reward of 1000 (later raised to 3000) hyperpyra for the capture of those involved.

In February 1461, the protopapas of Rethymno, Petros Tsagaropoulos, was expelled from Crete by the Council of Ten. In October 1461, the Jewish merchant David Mavrogonatos indicated Ioannis Gavalas as responsible for the deed. Gavalas was interrogated and executed along with a few other Cretans in early 1462. It is known today that the same Ioannis Lima who betrayed Vlastos, independently also betrayed Gavalas, but did not dare to seek a reward, fearing reprisals by the Cretans. Later on, having also served as a spy on behalf of Venice in Constantinople, Mavrogonatos was granted tax exemptions and the right to appear publicly without wearing a Jewish badge. He also successfully negotiated certain rights for the entire Jewish community of Crete. Manousakas' research cleared up a long-standing misconception, first made by Andrea Cornaro and adopted by many contemporary historians, according to which Mavrogonatos was involved in the betrayal of Vlastos' conspiracy in 1454.

As a precaution, the Venetians expelled all monks and priests who had come to Crete from the Ottoman-occupied Greek mainland.

== Aftermath ==
Both conspiracies were quelled before inflicting any tangible harm to the interests of Venice. However, the authorities remained vigilant and enforced further the measures towards the reunification of churches. Promotion of the union by Venice worsened the existing religious tensions in the Cretan society, which in turn helped develop some elements of national consciousness among Cretans. Realizing the failure of her policies and urged to secure the support of locals in the defense of Crete against the Turks as the Ottoman–Venetian wars broke out, Venice adopted a more sympathetic attitude towards Orthodoxy after the first half of the sixteenth century.
