= Becciu =

Becciu (Sardinian: [ˈbetʃu], Italian: [ˈbɛttʃu]) is a Sardinian surname, probably derived from Campidanese bécciu/béciu "old". Notable people with the name include:

- Ana Becciu (born 1948), Argentine poet, editor and translator
- Giovanni Angelo Becciu (born 1948), Italian Roman Catholic cardinal and convicted felon

== See also ==
- Beciu, a commune in Teleorman County, Romania
