= Brit Solli =

Norwegian archaeologist

Brit Solli (1959-2026) was a Norwegian archaeologist and professor of medieval archaeology at the Museum of Cultural History in Oslo. Until 2005, she was professor in historic archaeology at the University of Tromsø.

Solli was scientific director at the Centre for Advanced Study (CAS) from 2012 to 2015, at The Norwegian Academy of Science and Letters in Oslo.

== Research and academic achievements ==
Solli's areas of research included a wide array of themes: archaeological research history, theory and method, archaeology and identity, archaeology of gender, archaeology and zoo-archaeology, cultural heritage management and archaeology of Old Norse religion. Solli also carried out research on Christianisation of the Norse, urbanization, and socio-political history of the Viking Age and Middle Ages.

Solli participated in numerous excavations, and led the Veøya-project and the Borg III-project. She was also involved in an interdisciplinary project which was supported by the Norwegian Research Council (Snow Patch Archaeological Research Cooperation, or SPARC). related to archaeology and climate change.

Solli was on the editorial board of Journal of the North Atlantic until 2011, and was on the editorial board of Current Swedish Archaeology. Until 2009 she was one of the editors of Norwegian Archaeological Review. In the period of 2010-2011, she was editor-in-chief of the Norwegian archaeological journal VIKING.

In 1992, she was awarded a cultural prize for disseminating archaeology to the general public. The prize was awarded her in relation to the Veøya-project.

Solli died on 6 April 2026.
