= Vejle Boldklub =

Danish professional football club

Vejle
- Full name: Vejle Boldklub
- Nicknames: De Røde (The Reds); Jyllands Rubin (The Ruby of Jutland)
- Short name: VB
- Founded: 3 May 1891; 135 years ago
- Ground: Vejle Stadium
- Capacity: 11,060 (7,567 seated)
- Chairman: Tage Pedersen
- Head coach: Claus Nørgaard
- League: Danish 1st Division
- 2025–26: Superliga, 12th of 12 (relegated)
- Website: vejle-boldklub.dk
Home colours	Away colours

Vejle Boldklub (commonly known as Vejle or VB) is a Danish professional football club based in Vejle, Jutland. Founded in 1891, the club has won the Danish championship five times and the Danish Cup six times, making it one of the historically most successful clubs in Danish football.

The club has a long tradition of developing players for international football. Its most celebrated player is Allan Simonsen, who came through the club before joining Borussia Mönchengladbach and winning the Ballon d'Or in 1977. Other prominent players developed by Vejle include Johnny Hansen, Ulrik le Fevre, John Sivebæk and Thomas Gravesen..

== History ==
=== Early years ===
Vejle Boldklub was established on 3 May 1891 by 23 local residents, originally as a cricket club. Football became part of the club's activities in 1902.

The club's first successful period came in the 1910s. Vejle reached the Jutland championship final seven times during the decade and won the championship in 1912, 1913, 1914 and 1915.

=== Breakthrough in the 1950s ===
Vejle's rise towards the top of Danish football accelerated during the 1950s. The club gained promotion to the second tier in 1952 and reached the top division in 1956. Vejle subsequently remained in the highest Danish division for 36 consecutive seasons, at the time a Danish record.

In 1958, Vejle won the Danish championship for the first time and also won the Danish Cup, completing the first domestic double in the club's history. The team included players such as Tommy Troelsen, Henning Enoksen and Poul Jensen.

The following year Vejle retained the Danish Cup, defeating AGF 1–0 in the final. Four Vejle players – Enoksen, Troelsen, Jensen and Poul Mejer – were subsequently selected for the Danish squad that won the silver medal at the 1960 Summer Olympics in Rome.

=== The 1960s ===
Vejle remained among the leading clubs in Denmark during the 1960s, although the decade did not produce another major trophy. The club won bronze in 1960 and finished runners-up in 1965.

The mid-1960s team included Tommy Troelsen, Ole Fritsen, Kaj Poulsen, Johnny Hansen, Flemming Serritslev and Ulrik le Fevre. Six Vejle players appeared for Denmark during 1965, while Kaj Poulsen became the first Vejle player to be named Danish Football Player of the Year.

Vejle also reached the Danish Cup final in 1968, losing 3–1 to Randers Freja.

=== Golden era of the 1970s ===
The 1970s became the most successful decade in Vejle Boldklub's history. Under Frits Gotfredsen, Vejle won the Danish championship in 1971. The following season the club retained the championship and also won the Danish Cup, completing its second domestic double.

Allan Simonsen was among the leading players of the side. After the 1972 season he joined Borussia Mönchengladbach, where he became one of Europe's leading players and won the Ballon d'Or in 1977.

Vejle added further Danish Cup victories in 1975 and 1977. In European competition, the club reached the quarter-finals of the 1977–78 European Cup Winners' Cup, the deepest European run in its history.

Under coach Poul Erik Bech, Vejle won a fourth Danish championship in 1978. Among the prominent players of the decade were Simonsen, le Fevre, Serritslev, Gert Eg, Alex Nielsen, Steen Thychosen and Tommy Hansen.

=== The 1980s ===
Vejle began the 1980s by winning the Danish Cup for the sixth time in 1981, defeating Boldklubben Frem 2–1 in the final.

Simonsen returned to Vejle in 1983 after spells with Borussia Mönchengladbach, FC Barcelona and Charlton Athletic. In 1984, Vejle won its fifth Danish championship. The team included Simonsen, John Sivebæk, Steen Thychosen, Gert Eg and English forward Julian Barnett. Thychosen finished as the league's leading scorer with 24 goals.

In the late 1980s, local businessmen invested heavily in an attempt to return Vejle to the top of Danish football. High-profile players including Preben Elkjær were brought to the club, but the investments did not produce the expected sporting success.

=== Relegation and revival in the 1990s ===
Vejle were relegated from the top flight for the first time since 1956 following the 1991 season. Former star Allan Simonsen subsequently took charge as coach, but the club did not immediately return to the top level.

A revival began after Ole Fritsen became head coach in 1994. Building around a new generation of players, including Thomas Gravesen and Peter Graulund, Fritsen led Vejle back to the top flight in 1995.

Vejle finished runners-up in the 1996–97 Danish Superliga, their best league result since the 1984 championship, and qualified for European competition. Fritsen was named Danish Coach of the Year in 1997.

=== The 2000s ===
The beginning of the 21st century was marked by repeated promotions and relegations. Vejle were relegated in 2000, returned to the Superliga the following year and were relegated again in 2002. By 2004 the club was also facing serious financial difficulties.

A financial reconstruction was followed by renewed investment, and Vejle returned to the Superliga in 2006. The club moved into a new Vejle Stadium in 2008 and won the Danish 1st Division that same year with 78 points from 30 matches.

In 2011, the professional football operations of Vejle Boldklub and Kolding FC were merged as Vejle Boldklub Kolding. The cooperation ended after the 2012–13 season, after which the professional team again competed under the Vejle Boldklub name.

=== 2016–2025: Zolotko era ===
In 2016, Moldovan businessman Andrew Zolotko acquired a majority shareholding in the club, while former Vejle player Klaus Eskildsen remained a significant shareholder.

During Zolotko's ownership, the club invested in its first-team organisation, academy and facilities. Vejle won promotion to the Superliga in 2018, but were relegated the following season.

Under Constantin Gâlcă, Vejle won the 2019–20 Danish 1st Division and subsequently avoided relegation from the Superliga in 2020–21.

Vejle were relegated again in 2022 but immediately returned by winning the 2022–23 Danish 1st Division. The club retained their Superliga status in both 2023–24 and 2024–25.

=== Return to local ownership ===
In February 2025, Zolotko sold his shares to a group of Danish investors with strong ties to the Vejle area, returning the club to locally based Danish ownership.

A new board was appointed with Tage Pedersen as chairman and former Vejle player and long-standing shareholder Klaus Eskildsen as vice-chairman.

Vejle were relegated to the Danish 1st Division at the end of the 2025–26 season.

== Europe ==
Vejle first appeared in the European Cup in 1972 following their Danish championship the previous year. In the 1973–74 European Cup, the club eliminated French champions FC Nantes before facing Celtic in the second round. Vejle drew 0–0 with Celtic before losing the other leg 1–0.

The club's greatest European run came in the 1977–78 European Cup Winners' Cup, when Vejle reached the quarter-finals before being eliminated by Dutch side FC Twente. This remains the furthest the club has progressed in a major UEFA competition.

As Danish champions, Vejle returned to the European Cup in 1979. They eliminated Austria Wien before facing Hajduk Split in the second round. Although Vejle were eliminated on aggregate, they won the away leg in Split 2–1.

Vejle's most recent UEFA campaign came in the 1998–99 UEFA Cup. The club defeated Spanish side Real Betis 1–0 in Vejle through a late goal by Peter Graulund, before losing the return leg 5–0 in Seville.

== Stadium and identity ==
Vejle Boldklub has been based in Nørreskoven (“the North Forest”) in the northern part of Vejle since 1922. The present Vejle Stadium opened in 2008 on the site of the club's previous stadium and has a capacity of 11,060, including 7,567 seats.

The club traditionally plays in red shirts and white shorts and is commonly known as De Røde ("The Reds"). Another long-standing nickname is Jyllands Rubin ("The Ruby of Jutland").

Vejle has historically been strongly associated with the city and surrounding area, both through its support and through its tradition of developing players. The club's traditional regional rivalries include matches against AGF and AC Horsens.

== Current squad ==
As of 3 September 2026

Note: Flags indicate national team as defined under FIFA eligibility rules; some limited exceptions apply. Players may hold more than one non-FIFA nationality.

No.	Pos.	Nation	Player
1	GK	DEN	Nicolai Larsen
2	MF	DEN	Thomas Gundelund
3	DF	DEN	Christian Sørensen
4	DF	DEN	Lasse Nielsen (captain)
5	DF	DEN	Valdemar Lund
6	MF	DEN	Mike Vestergård
8	MF	DEN	Mathias Jensen
9	FW	NED	Jelle Duin
10	FW	DEN	Mikkel Duelund
11	MF	DEN	Lucas From
14	DF	DEN	Hjalte Gitz
15	DF	FRO	Gunnar Vatnhamar
16	MF	DEN	Tobias Bach

No.	Pos.	Nation	Player
17	MF	DEN	Andrew Hjulsager
18	MF	DEN	Gustav Marcussen
19	FW	DEN	Wahid Faghir
20	MF	GUI	Abdoulaye Camara
21	MF	GEO	Giorgi Tabatadze
23	DF	SWE	Johan Karlsson
24	GK	DEN	Thorbjørn Pløger
25	MF	DEN	Max Jensen
26	MF	DEN	Sander Ravn
30	MF	DEN	Nicolas Gammelgaard
31	GK	DEN	Kasper Kristensen
32	FW	GHA	Bismark Edjeodji
34	MF	ALB	Lundrim Hetemi

== Technical staff ==
Position	Name
Sporting director	(Denmark) Mikkel Hemmersam
Head coach	(Denmark) Claus Nørgaard
Assistant coach	(Denmark) Nikolaj Primdal
Assistant coach	(Denmark) Steffen Kielstrup
Assistant coach	(Denmark) Morten Bisgaard

== Notable players ==
Vejle Boldklub has a long tradition of developing players who have represented Denmark and played professionally abroad. Allan Simonsen is generally regarded as the club's greatest player. After emerging at Vejle, he joined Borussia Mönchengladbach and became the first – and to date only – Danish player to win the Ballon d'Or, in 1977.

Other notable players developed by Vejle include Johnny Hansen, Ulrik le Fevre, Steen Thychosen, John Sivebæk, Thomas Gravesen and Oliver Provstgaard. The club has also attracted prominent Danish players at other stages of their careers, including Preben Elkjær and Thomas Sørensen.

=== English players at Vejle ===
Relatively few English players have represented Vejle Boldklub, with Julian Barnett and Nathan Trott among the most notable.

Barnett joined Vejle in 1983 and became a regular in the first team. He was part of the side that won the Danish championship in 1984 and remained at the club until 1987, making 181 official appearances.

Goalkeeper Nathan Trott joined Vejle on loan from West Ham United in 2022. He helped the club win promotion to the Superliga in 2022–23 and remained first-choice goalkeeper during the following top-flight season.

=== Vejle players in English football ===
A number of players developed by or strongly associated with Vejle have later played in English football.

Thomas Gravesen is the most prominent example. He broke through at Vejle in the mid-1990s and was part of the side that finished runners-up in Denmark in 1996–97. After moving to Hamburger SV, he joined Everton in 2000 and became a regular in the Premier League before moving to Real Madrid in 2005. He later returned to Everton on loan from Celtic.

John Sivebæk, a member of Vejle's 1984 championship team, moved directly from the club to Manchester United in 1986. On 22 November that year, he scored the only goal in a 1–0 win over Queens Park Rangers, giving Alex Ferguson both his first goal and first victory as Manchester United manager.

Other former Vejle players who appeared in English football include goalkeeper Thomas Sørensen, who had long spells with Sunderland, Aston Villa and Stoke City, and Allan Simonsen, who spent part of the 1982–83 season with Charlton Athletic before returning to Vejle.

French striker Hugo Ekitike spent the second half of the 2020–21 season on loan at Vejle from Stade de Reims, making 11 league appearances and scoring three goals. Ekitike has later described the move to Denmark as a turning point in his career, saying that the experience motivated him to prove himself and helped him establish himself in Reims' first team after returning to France. He subsequently played for Paris Saint-Germain and Eintracht Frankfurt before joining Liverpool in 2025.

== Title-winning coaches ==
Coach	Period	Major achievements
(Denmark) Ejnar Jensen	1958	Danish Cup winner 1958
(Denmark) Frits Gotfredsen	1951–1954, 1958–1961, 1970–1971	Danish champions 1958 and 1971; Danish Cup winner 1959
(Hungary) Jozef Szentgyörgyi	1971–1973	Danish championship and Danish Cup double in 1972
(Austria) Ernst Netuka	1962–1965, 1974–1975	Danish Cup winner 1975
(Denmark) Poul Erik Bech	1976–1978, 1984–1987	Danish Cup winner 1977; Danish champions 1978 and 1984; Danish Coach of the Year 1984
(Denmark) Ole Fritsen	1981–1983, 1988–1989, 1994–1999	Danish Cup winner 1981; Danish Coach of the Year 1997

== Notable captains ==
Captain
(Denmark) Erik Skaaning
(Denmark) Flemming Serritslev
(Denmark) Gert Eg
(Denmark) Allan Simonsen
(Denmark) Steffen Kielstrup
(Spain) Raúl Albentosa
(Denmark) Oliver Provstgaard

== Honours ==
Competition	Winners	Runners-up
Danish Championship	5; 1958, 1971, 1972, 1978, 1984	3; 1965, 1974, 1996–97
Danish Cup	6; 1957–58, 1958–59, 1971–72, 1974–75, 1976–77, 1980–81	1; 1967–68

== See also ==
- Vejle Boldklub (women)
