= Perla Fuscaldo =

Argentinian Egyptologist

- Born: 1941 (age 84–85)

Academic background
- Education: University of Buenos Aires
- Influences: Abraham Rosenvasser Manfred Bietak

Academic work
- Notable works: Revista de Estudios de Egiptología

Elba Perla Fuscaldo (born 1941) is an Argentinian Egyptologist, specialist in the ceramics of Ancient Egypt.

== Life ==
She graduated in 1967 in history from the University of Buenos Aires and obtained her PhD in 1978 under the supervision of Argentinian egyptologist Abraham Rosenvasser.

She was professor in the University of Buenos Aires, director of the Institute of Oriental Ancient History (IHAO-UBA), director of the Program of Studies in Egyptology (PREDE-CONICET), head of the department of Egyptology (IMHICIHU-CONICET, today Unit of Investigations on the Ancient Near East) and honorary researcher at the Museum of Natural Sciences of La Plata.

She was director of the Revista del Instituto de Historia Antigua Oriental (RIHAO, Journal of the Institute of Ancient East History ) and the monograph series Annexes to the Magazine of Studies in Egiptology (Revista de Estudios de Egiptología – REE). She was honorary researcher at the Center of Studies of Ancient Near Eastern History (Pontifical Catholic University of Argentina).

She was director of the Argentinian Archaeologic Mission in Tell the-Ghaba, Sinai Peninsula, on the Way of Horus. She participated in the Austrian archaeological mission in Tell the-Dab'to, ancient Avaris, the capital of the Hyksos period, under the supervision of Manfred Bietak.

== Publications ==
- Tell el-Dab`to X: The Palace District of Avaris. The Pottery of the Hyksos Period and the New Kingdom (Areas H/III and H/SAW). Part I: Locus 66. (Denkschriften der Gesamtakademie. Untersuchungen der Zweigstelle Kairo Give österreichischen archäologischen Institutes, herausgegeben in Verbindung mit der ägyptischen Kommission von Manfred Bietak, Band XVI). Austrian Academy of Sciences Press, Vienna, 2000.
  - Fuscaldo, Perla; Lupo, Silvia (2007). Tell el-Ghaba I : a saite settlement in North Sinai, Egypt (Argentine Archaeological Mission, 1995-2004). Buenos Aires: Consejo Nacional de Investigaciones Cientificas y Tecnicas - CONICET. ISBN 978-950-692-073-9. OCLC 694515454.
- Tell el-Dab`to X: The Palace District of Avaris. The Pottery of the Hyksos Period and the New Kingdom (Areas H/III and H/VI). Part II: Two Execration Pits and a Foundation Deposit, Austrian Academy of Sciences Press, Vienna, 2010.
