= Damqatum =

Peer-reviewed academic journal

- Discipline: History and Archaeology of the Ancient Near East
- Language: English, French, Spanish

Publication details
- History: 2006–present
- Publisher: CEHAO, Pontifical Catholic University of Argentina (Argentina)

Standard abbreviations
- ISO 4: Damqatum

Indexing
- ISSN: 1852-6594

Links
- Journal homepage

Damqatum is an annual academic journal published by the Center of Studies of Ancient Near Eastern History (CEHAO) (Pontifical Catholic University of Argentina, Buenos Aires), which is dedicated to the history and archaeology of the Near East, from the Palaeolithic period to the Ottoman period. The journal publishes articles for the general public, interviews with prominent researchers, as well as news about a range academic activities.

Published under an initiative of the Pontifical Catholic University of Argentina that promotes unrestricted access to scientific information, Damqatum is freely accessible online. The journal's articles are characterized by the presentation of preliminary high-impact research results and the use of high-definition images.

== Abstracting and indexing ==
The journal is abstracted and indexed in many bibliographic databases, including AWOL, ETANA, LACRIEE, LatinREV, Red BUCOC, and RODNA.

== Editors-in-Chief ==
The following persons are or have been editors-in-chief:

- Juan Manuel Tebes (2006–2010)
- Francisco Céntola (2011–2015)
- Jorge Cano Moreno (2016-2025)
- María Cecilia Tomasini & Mateo Valeggiani (since 2025)

== See also ==
- Ancient Near East Monographs
- Antiguo Oriente
- List of history journals
- List of theology journals
