= Valvestino =

Valvestino Val Vestì (Lombard)
- Comune
- Comune di Valvestino
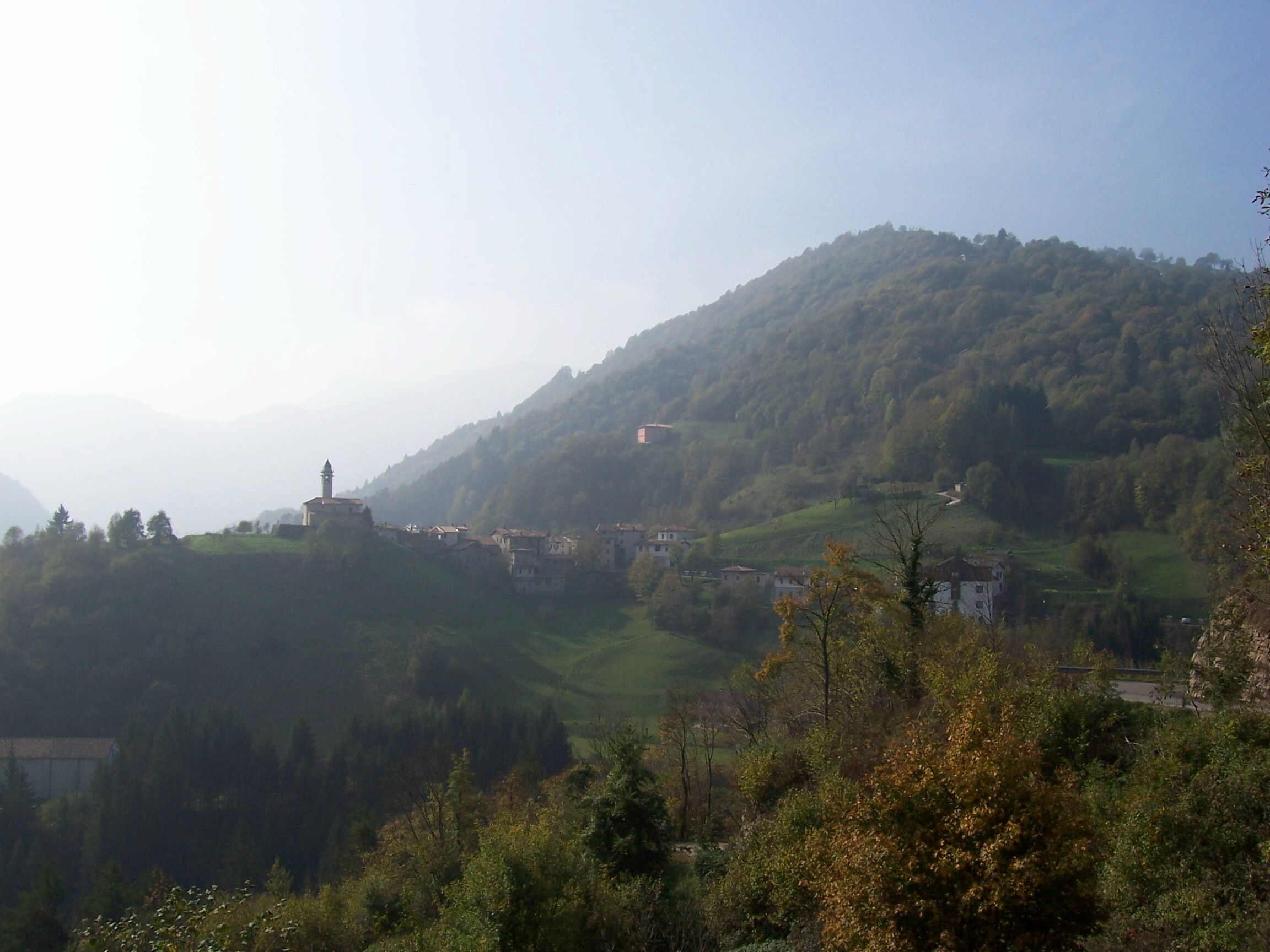

- Location within Italy Location within Lombardy
- Coordinates: 45°45′40″N 10°35′45″E
- Country: Italy
- Region: Lombardy
- Province: Brescia (BS)
- Frazioni: Armo, Bollone, Droane, Moerna, Persone e Turano

Government
  - Mayor: Davide Pace (Lista Civica)

Area
  - Total: 31 km^{2} (12 sq mi)

Population (2011)
  - Total: 213
  - Density: 6.9/km^{2} (18/sq mi)
- Demonym: Valvestinesi
- Time zone: UTC+1 (CET)
  - Summer (DST): UTC+2 (CEST)
- Postal code: 25080
- Dialing code: 0365
- Patron saint: San Giovanni Battista
- Saint day: 29 August
- Website: Official website

Valvestino (Brescian: Val Vestì) is a comune in the province of Brescia, in Lombardy in northern Italy.

== Historical and cultural profile ==
The Stoni (or Stoeni) people and the Gallic Cenomani, then the Romans and the Lombards settled the area. The Lodrone family were the lords of Valvestino from 1200 to 1807. The valley was―officially―absorbed by the Austro-Hungarian Empire in the mid-19th century but for many years operated, in effect, as an autonomous region without external oversight, owing to its relative geographic isolation in the mountains. It came to Italy in 1919. Valvestino was separated administratively from Trentino in 1934, becoming a comune of five frazioni (municipal subdivisions): Armo, Bollone, Moerna, Persone and Turano. The ancient administrative autonomy restored to Valvestino in 1947.

The abundance of pastures has always been significant for the village economy, dedicated to cattle raising that survives to the present, in summer mountain barns, with production of milk, from which famous cheeses and butter are obtained. Historically, the cores of the hamlets of Armo, Bollone, Moerna, Persone and Turano are crossings of small passages between peasants' high and narrow houses.

== Festival and events ==
- In August, Armo has the Feast of the Alpini (Alpine troops)
- A local variation of the traditional religious festival, Festa del Perdono ('Feast of Forgiveness') is held in Turano on the last Sunday of August each year. It commemorates the sojourn of the exiled Pope Alexander III, who in gratitude for the villagers' hospitality issued a Papal indulgence, for remission of sins, to the valley's inhabitiants. This tradition, although dating to at least the 15th century, is likely apocryphal.

== See also ==
- Monte Camiolo
