= Archaeopress =

British archaeological book publisher

Archaeopress Publishing Limited
- Traded as: Archaeopress
- Founded: 1997
- Founder: David Davison and Rajka Makjanic
- Country of origin: United Kingdom
- Headquarters location: Bicester
- Nonfiction topics: Archaeology
- Official website: https://www.archaeopress.com

Archaeopress is an academic publisher specialising in archaeology, based in Bicester, Oxfordshire. The company publishes multiple series of books and academic journals, including Archaeopress Archaeology, Proceedings of the Seminar for Arabian Studies (PSAS), and Antiguo Oriente.

== History ==
In the early 1990s, David Davison and Rajka Makjanic worked at Tempvs Reparatvm, involved with publishing archaeological titles. Archaeopress was founded in 1997, with Davison leading the editing process whilst Makjanic managed production of the books.

Archaeopress, with John and Erica Hedges, succeeded Tempvs Reparatvm as the publisher of the British Archaeological Reports series, though in 2015 began concentrating their own range of imprints.

In September 2024 Archaeopress relocated its headquarters north of Oxford to Bicester.
