= Poul Erik Bech =

Danish football manager

Personal information
- Full name: Poul Erik Bech
- Date of birth: 15 March 1938
- Place of birth: Fredericia, Denmark
- Date of death: 5 April 2014 (aged 76)

Managerial career
- Years: Team
- 1973–1975: Denmark U-19
- 1976–1978: Vejle Boldklub
- 1980–1983: Aarhus GF
- 1984–1987: Vejle Boldklub
- Nørre Aaby IK
- 1990–1996: Denmark U-15 & U-16
- 1996–1997: FC Fredericia

Poul Erik Bech (15 March 1938 – 5 April 2014) was a Danish football manager. He won the 1984 Danish Championship with Vejle Boldklub and was awarded Manager of the Year the same year.
