= Gert Eg =

Danish footballer (born 1954)

Personal information
- Date of birth: 26 February 1954 (age 72)
- Place of birth: Denmark
- Position: Centre-back

Youth career
- Vejle Boldklub

Senior career*
Years	Team	Apps	(Gls)
1973–1986	Vejle Boldklub	342	(44)
- * Club domestic league appearances and goals

Gert Eg (born 26 February 1954) is a Danish former footballer. He played his entire career for Vejle Boldklub and holds the club record for most played matches. He was an allrounder that could cover almost any position on the field. However, he was primarily known as an elegant and clever central defender with a great understanding of the game.

== Biography ==
Eg made 509 appearances for Vejle Boldklub's first team and was part of many great triumphs in the 1970s and 1980s. In a long period of time he was the team's captain.

In 1975 Eg was the matchwinner as Vejle Boldklub won the Danish Cup. Thus, VB qualified for the UEFA Cup Winners Cup, where the team made it to the quarter-finals.

In 1983 Eg decided to end his footballing career, but already in 1984 he was back and became very successful once again. The same season Vejle Boldklub won its fifth Danish Championship with Eg and Allan Simonsen as some of the biggest profiles in the team.

== Honours ==
Vejle Boldklub

- The Danish Championship: 1978, 1984
- The Danish Cup: 1975, 1977, 1981
