= European Journal of Post-Classical Archaeologies =

- Discipline: Archaeology
- Language: English, French, Italian, Spanish
- Edited by: Gian Pietro Brogiolo, Alexandra Chavarría Arnau

Publication details
- History: 2011-present
- Publisher: Società Archeologica
- Frequency: Continuous
- Open access: Hybrid; Delayed, after 12 months

Standard abbreviations
- ISO 4: Eur. J. Post-Class. Archaeol.

Indexing
- ISSN: 2039-7895
- LCCN: 2013255245
- OCLC no.: 852256949

Links
- Journal homepage; Online archive

The European Journal of Post-Classical Archaeologies is a peer-reviewed academic journal covering the archaeology of the post-classical era that was established in 2011. It is published by the Società Archeologica and the editors-in-chief are Gian Pietro Brogiolo and Alexandra Chavarría Arnau ( University of Padua). The journal offers an annual award for the best single-authored paper submitted by a young researcher (under 35 years of age).

== Abstracting and indexing ==
The journal is abstracted and indexed in Scopus.
