= Institute of Social Sciences Research =

Unit of Pontifical Catholic University of Argentina

Institute of Social Sciences Research (IICS)
- Type: Private research institute
- Established: 2015
- Affiliations: Pontifical Catholic University of Argentina CONICET
- Location: Buenos Aires
- Website: www.uca.edu.ar/iics

The Institute of Social Sciences Research (known by its Spanish acronym IICS, for Instituto de Investigaciones de la Facultad de Ciencias Sociales) is an excellence research center of the Pontifical Catholic University of Argentina and Associated Unit of the CONICET located in Buenos Aires, Argentina, dedicated to research in the field of the social sciences and the humanities.

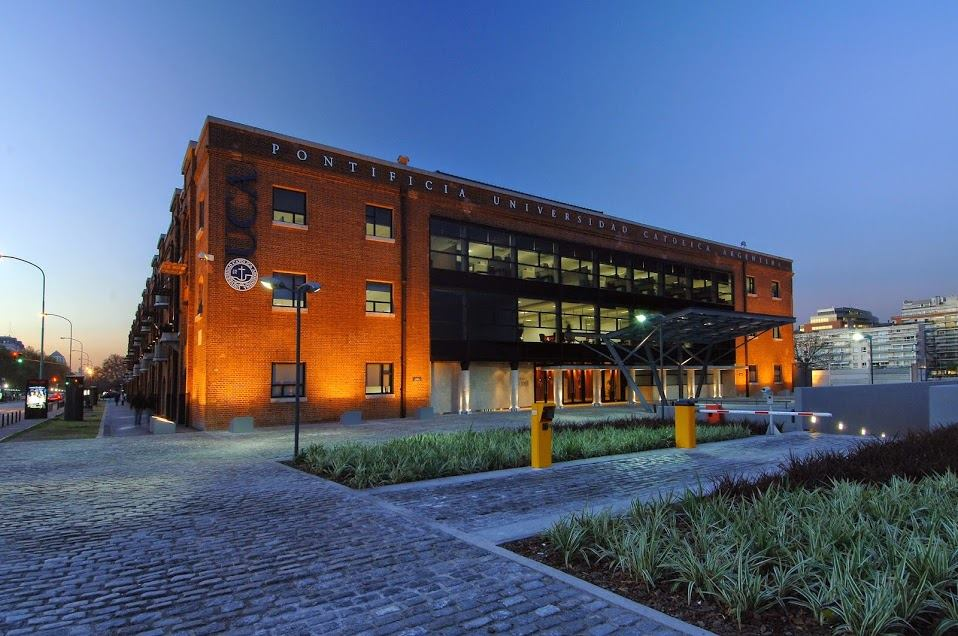
The IICS is located in the San José Building, Puerto Madero Campus of the Pontifical Catholic University of Argentina

== History ==
In 1962 the Pontifical Catholic University of Argentina founded the Centre of Sociology Research, which had a long and relevant history until the creation of the Faculty of Social Sciences in 2011. In that year, researchers from social and humanistic disciplines joined this initial nucleus, leading to the foundation of the institute in 2015.

== Research ==
The Institute of Social Sciences Research includes scholars of excellence from the Pontifical Catholic University of Argentina and the CONICET. Founded under the format of the international institutes of advanced studies, the mission of the IICS is to develop high quality interdisciplinary research and to serve as a framework of interaction between senior and junior scholars. The fields of research of the IICS, based on the social sciences and the humanities, are varied, although are very important the research on poverty and inclusion, archaeology of Northwest Argentina, and the history of the ancient East (Egyptology and Bible studies). As a university institute, the IICS shares researchers and projects with similar centers and projects of the Pontifical Catholic University of Argentina, such as the CEHAO. The researchers of the institute frequently appear in the national public news media, especially in newspapers and television.

== Directors ==
- Fernando Devoto (2015-2018)
- Roxana Flammini (2018-2022)
- Ariel Guiance (from 2022)

== See also ==
- Pontifical Catholic University of Argentina
- CONICET
- CEHAO
