= Joseph Bryennios =

15th century Byzantine monk

Joseph Bryennios (Greek: Ἰωσὴφ Βρυέννιος; around 1350 – 1431/38) was a learned Byzantine monk of the 15th century. He was a monk at the Monastery of Stoudios. He wrote many important works of scholarship in support of Orthodoxy, and against the Union of Churches. He died sometime between 1431 and 1438.

== Bibliography ==
- N. V. Tomadakis, «Ἁγιορειτικοὶ κώδικες τῶν ἔργων Ἰωσὴφ Βρυεννίου» Επ.Επ.Ετ.Βυζ.Σπ. Vol.32(1963), pp. 26–39.
- Konstantinos Dyovouniotis, «Τὸ δήθεν διπλωματικὸν απόρρητον του Ἰωσὴφ Βρυεννίου», Πρακτικὰ τῆς Ἀκαδημίας Ἀθηνῶν, Vol.4 (1923), pp. 117–184.
- N. V. Tomadakis, Ο Ιωσήφ Βρυέννιος και η Κρήτη κατά το 1400. Μελέτη φιλολογική και ιστορική. Athens 1947
- Nikolaos Ioannidis, Ἰωσὴφ Βρυεννίου περὶ μνημοσύνου τοῦ Πάπα, Athens 1984
- E Peruzzi, «Ὁ τόπος τῆς ἐν Κρήτῃ διαμονής Ἰωσὴφ του Βρυεννίου», Cretica Chronica, Vol.2 (1948), pp. 366–370
- N. V. Tomadakis, «Ἰωσὴφ Βρυέννιος», Σύλλαβος βυζαντινῶν μελετῶν καὶ κειμένων. Athens 1961, pp. 491–611
- Kapriev, Georgi (2019). "Joseph Bryennios". In: Brungs, Alexander; Kapriev, Georgi; Mudroch, Vilem (eds). Die Philosophie des Mittelalters 1: Byzanz, Judentum [The Philosophy of the Middle Ages 1: Byzantium, Judaism]. Grundriss der Geschichte der Philosophie, new edition. Basel: Schwabe, ISBN 978-3-7965-2623-7, pp. 185-186.
