= Santiago Legarre =

Argentine law professor (born 1968)

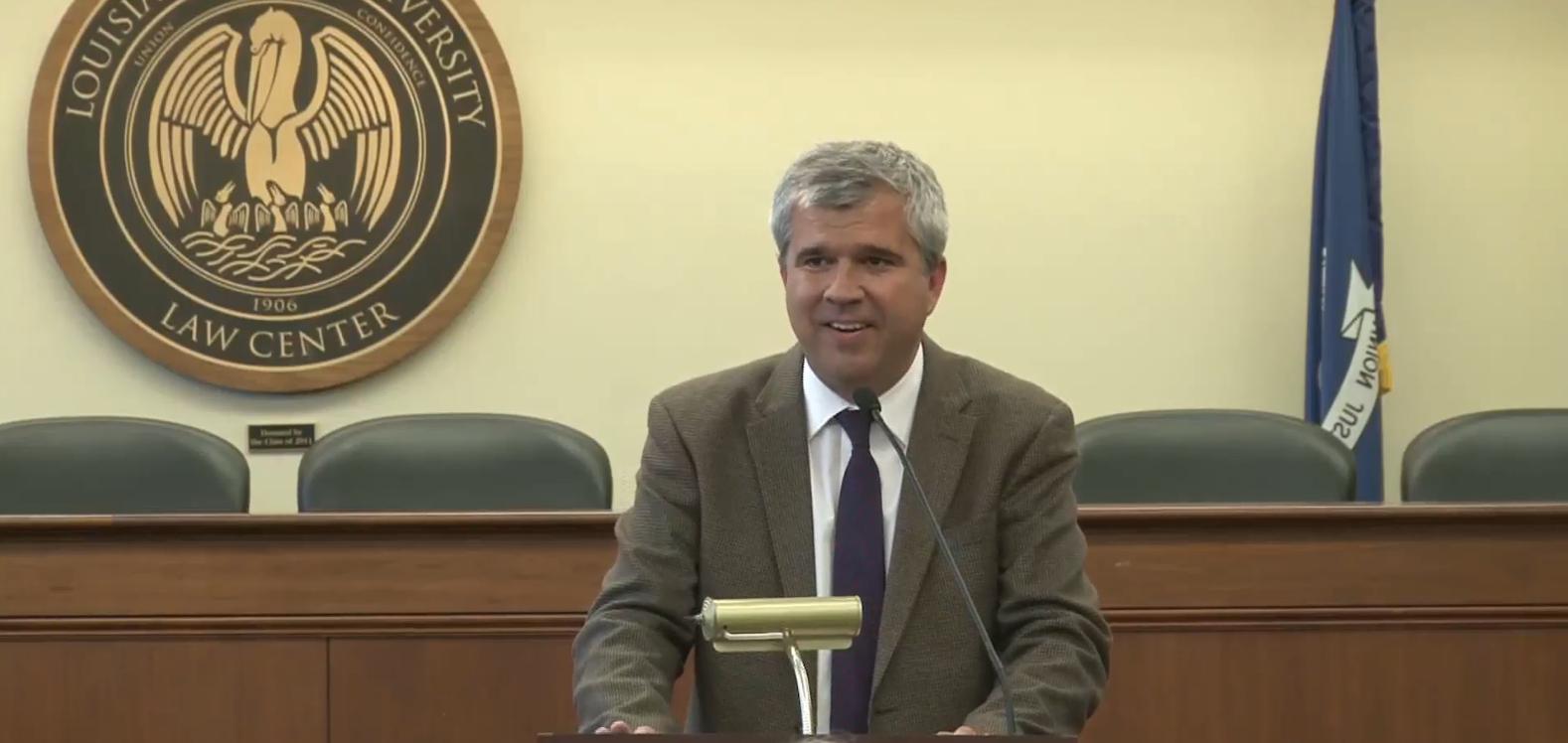
- Santiago Legarre at the Paul M. Hebert Law Center (LSU) in 2017
- Born: May 24, 1968 (age 58)
- Occupations: Professor, writer

Santiago Legarre (born May 24, 1968 in Buenos Aires, Argentina) is an Argentine attorney and a professor of law at Pontifical Catholic University of Argentina.

== Biography ==
Legarre received his law degree in 1992 and subsequently earned a Master of Studies in legal research from Oxford University and a PhD from Universidad de Buenos Aires. While at Oxford he wrote a dissertation titled "The Historical Background of the Police Power", published in 2007 by the University of Pennsylvania Journal of Constitutional Law.

After law school he clerked for the Argentine Supreme Court. He then started his career in law teaching at Universidad Austral in 1995. After twelve years, Legarre moved to UCA in 2007. In 2011 he was a guest at the Max Planck Institute (MPI) for Legal History and Legal Theory, in Frankfurt. Since 2012 he is also a visiting professor at the University of Notre Dame Law School (Indiana) and at Strathmore Law School (Kenya), where he developed a teaching system of expressing knowledge through art. In the United States, he also teaches at the LSU Paul M. Hebert Law Center and at the Loyola University New Orleans College of Law. Sponsored by the International Association of Law Schools (IALS), in 2013 he lectured at the Kalinga Institute of Technology (KIIT) and at the Jindal Global Law School, both in India. In 2016 he lectured at Harvard Law School, invited by the American Constitution Society; and at Cornell Law School, where he was part of the Berger International Speakers Series. In 2017 he presented on natural law and constitutional law for the Eric Voegelin Institute at Louisiana State University, for the JSD Program at NYU Law School, and for the Toth-Lonergan Chair of Seton Hall University. In 2018 he gave a lecture on comparative constitutionalism at the Georgetown Law Center sponsored by FLAG (Foreign Lawyers At Georgetown). In 2019 he presented to the faculty of the LSU Paul M. Hebert Law Center on "Teaching Constitutional Law Across Three Continents". That same year he also spoke on "Why Comparative Constitutional Law", for the Programme for the Foundations of Law and Constitutional Government (Faculty of Law, University of Oxford) and for the Faculty of Law at the University of Zurich. In October 2019 he lectured at the China University of Political Science and Law (CUPL) in Beijing and in November of the same year at the East China University of Political Science and Law (ECUPL) in Shanghai. In 2020 he lectured on "International Law and Comparative Constitutionalism" at Columbia Law School, invited by the Columbia Society of International Law, and, together with coauthor Christopher R. Handy, on "When to Follow Precedent", at the LSU Paul M. Hebert Law Center, invited by the Hispanic Law Students Association. During the Covid crisis, in October of the same year, he delivered via zoom a lecture titled "Against Comparative Constitutional Law" at the Institute of History of Law of the University of Zurich. In 2021 he revisited the Eric Voegelin Institute at LSU, this time for the Political Theory Lunch Colloquy, with a hybrid session on precedent; and he gave, by zoom, a lecture on overruling at the Supreme Court at Tulane University School of Law (New Orleans). In 2021 he also revisited Seton Hall University Law School (New Jersey), where he spoke on the relevance of natural law for constitutional interpretation. In 2022 Legarre, together with coauthor Handy, spoke on zoom to the faculty of the Loyola University New Orleans College of Law. The topic was "A Civil Law State in a Common Law Nation; A Civil Law Nation with a Common Law Touch". In February of the same year, Legarre shared a panel with author Luca Doninelli in Sicily. The title of the panel was "Di Cosa Scrive la Vita?" and it took place in the Chiesa di San Mattia, in Palermo (Italy). In October 2022 he lectured in Italian at the Universita degli Studi di Macerata on "Lo Statto nell' Ottocento: esperienze costituzionali a confronto". In 2023, Legarre was invited by the Comparative Law Association to give a lecture at the University of Pennsylvania Carey Law School. He spoke on "International Law and Comparative Law: the Eternal Confusion". In Spring 2024 he visited for the first time the Tulane Law School in New Orleans, invited by the Tulane Law Review; he delivered a lecture on the right to life in comparative perspective, sponsored by the Federalist Society at the Indiana University McKinney School of Law (Indianapolis) and a presentation on natural law at The Michigan Union, in the University of Michigan (Ann Arbor). Later in 2024 Legarre was invited to give speeches, in French and Italian, on the constitutional issues involved in the policies of Argentine president Javier Milei at SciencesPo (Paris) and at the Universitá del Salento (Lecce). In 2025 he taught a one week class on Comparative Constitutional Law at the China University of Political Science and Law (CUPL) in Changping and he presented to the faculty of Notre Dame Law School on "Natural Law for the 21st Century." In 2026 he gave a presentation at Yale Law School on "Jurisprudence Constante." This was the fifth Ivy League University where he had speaking engagements, having thus presented at every Ivy League Law School.

Legarre's academic interests include constitutional law and jurisprudence. His work has been published by several journals including the following: American Journal of Jurisprudence, Harvard Journal of Law and Public Policy, Jurisprudence: an International Journal of Legal and Political Thought, Louisiana Law Review, Tulane Law Review, Loyola Law Review, Journal of Civil Law Studies, Notre Dame Journal of International and Comparative Law, Notre Dame Journal of Law, Ethics, and Public Policy, Chinese Journal of International Law, and Kalinga Institute of Industrial Technology Journal of Law and Society. He also teaches a workshop on creative writing for law students. Together with a group of students he founded in 2006 the online magazine Sed Contra and was the first editor-in-chief. The magazine has published articles by hundreds of law students and is still operative.

Legarre is a main researcher at CONICET, the Argentine National Council for Research. He writes freelance for La Nación, a leading Argentine newspaper.
