= Pyrenae =

Academic journal

- Discipline: Archaeology
- Language: English, Catalan
- Edited by: Gisela Ripoll

Publication details
- History: 1965–present
- Publisher: University of Barcelona (Spain)
- Frequency: Biannual

Standard abbreviations
- ISO 4: Pyrenae

Indexing
- ISSN: 0079-8215 (print); 2339-9171 (web)

Links
- Journal homepage

Pyrenae, Revista de Prehistòria i Antiguitat de la Mediterrània Occidental / Journal of Western Mediterranean Prehistory and Antiquity, is a biannual peer-reviewed academic journal of archaeology published by the Secció de Prehistòria i Arqueologia (Section of Prehistory and Archaeology) of the University of Barcelona. The journal focuses a chronological framework that ranges from prehistory to the beginning of the Middle Ages, especially in the Western Mediterranean. The editor-in-chief is Gisela Ripoll.

== Abstracting and indexing ==
The journal is abstracted and indexed in Carhus Plus+, ANEP, CIRC, ERIH PLUS, SCOPUS (until 2015), Difusión y Calidad Editorialde las Revistas Españolas de Humanidades y Ciencias Sociales y Jurídicas, CINDOC, CSIC CCHS, ANECA, APh, L’Année Philologique. Bibliographie critique et analytique de l’Antiquité gréco-latine (Société Internationale de Bibliographie Classique/SIBC); Dialnet; Generalitat de Catalunya, Tribuna d’Arqueologia; InterClassica; ISOC, Ciencias Sociales y Humanidades, Centro de Ciencias Humanas y Sociales (CCHS) del CSIC (ES); Latindex; Periodicals Index Online, Revistes Catalanes amb Accés Obert, REGESTA IMPERII, Akademie der Wissenschaften und der Literatur and Ulrich's Web.

== History ==
The journal was established in 1965 by Joan Maluquer de Motes i Nicolau as a vehicle for disseminating the work of the academic staff and researchers of the Institut d’Arqueologia i Prehistòria (Institute of Archaeology and Prehistory) of the University of Barcelona.

In the first stage, the journal’s editors were Lluís Pericot and Joan Maluquer while Ana Mª. Muñoz Amilibia acted as its secretary; other professors, such Agustina Fort, Ricardo Martín, Anna Mª. Rauret, Carme Solsona, Pere Vegué and Miquel Oliva, collaborated in its preparation. The first number, Pyrenae 1 in 1965, contained a series of articles that demonstrated the aims that lay behind the creation of the journal: to give greater projection to the research work of the Institute of Archaeology and Prehistory of the University of Barcelona as the mouthpiece for what was known as the Escola d’Arqueologia de Barcelona (the Barcelona School of Archaeology). Issue number 1 set the tone for what Pyrenae was to be like in subsequent years with articles by Pere Bosch Gimpera, Joan Maluquer, Pere de Palol, Lluís Pericot, Miquel Tarradell, together with texts by Antoni Arribas, Ana Mª. Muñoz, Anna Mª. Rauret, Mª. Lluïsa Serra, Carme Solsona, and Glòria Trias, among others. Pyrenae demonstrated the impact of Catalan archaeology both at the level of the Iberian Peninsula and at an international level.

Twelve numbers of Pyrenae were published at regular intervals in octavo format with some 200-250 pages per volume until 1976. From that year onwards, four double volumes were published up to issue 19-20 in 1983-84. This first phase was brought to a close with the publication of volume 21 in 1985, coinciding with the appointment of Professor Maluquer, who had been the driving force behind the journal, as an emeritus professor.

In 1993, after a long interruption of eight years, the members of the Department of Prehistory, Ancient History and Archaeology of the University of Barcelona decided to resume the journal Pyrenae, with the aim of making the research being carried out in our country more widely known. Maria Àngels Petit assumed responsibility for the journal, as Secretary to the Editorial Board in the first instance and ultimately as Editor, assisted by an Advisory Board made up by all the full professors of the Department at that moment, Josep M. Fullola, Josep M. Gurt, José Remesal and Mercè Roca, and by an Editorial Board, the composition of which rotated, but which was initially formed by Francisco Gracia, Fernando Martín, José Luis Maya, Rosario Navarro, Josep Padró and Joan Sanmartí.

In this second phase, the publication adapted to the times, changing its format from octavo to quarto, while maintaining an average of some 300 pages per volume. The journal was made up by three clearly differentiated parts. The first one comprised articles; a second one, under the heading Vària, contained works of lesser breadth and significance, and finally a third section of reviews. During this phase, obituaries of members of the Department’s academic staff, whether actively employed or retired, who had died were also included. This was a period when there was no need to publish in indexed journals outside one’s usual working environment. For that reason, in the ten issues published during this second phase, the majority of articles were by members of the Department itself or concerned their research fields. It should also be emphasised that Pyrenae acted as a platform for the publication of articles derived from some undergraduate dissertations or parts of important doctoral theses. A total of 10 issues were published up to the double volume for the years 2002-2003, the first being the one corresponding to volumes 22/23 dedicated to a well-deserved homage to Professor Joan Maluquer, which, however, were published some years later, at the end of this period.

The year 2003 witnessed a reconsideration of the journal’s aims, which ultimately gave rise to a new proposal for its publication, while maintaining its title and the idea that it should be the journal of the Department of Prehistory, Ancient History and Archaeology of the University of Barcelona. This new proposal was presented by Gisela Ripoll together with Rosa Mª. Albert and Jaume Buxeda. In this way, a new phase of the journal was undertaken.

This third phase of Pyrenae, the one beginning in the early 21st century, started with volume 35 corresponding to 2004. Editorial responsibility was assumed by Gisela Ripoll, with the support of Rosa Mª. Albert, Jaume Buxeda and Víctor Revilla as Assistant Editors. Over the course of the years, various individuals have taken the role of assistant editor in turn; these duties are currently shared by Miguel Ángel Cau and Inés Domingo. This team is assisted by the Associate Editors, researchers of international reputation who, in one way or another, are linked with the University of Barcelona and the journal Pyrenae (see Associate Editors, Editorial Board page).

In this new phase, Pyrenae aims to establish itself as a point of reference among periodical publications in the scholarly world in the Iberian Peninsula and the Western Mediterranean. As from this moment, Pyrenae took the name Pyrenae, Revista de Prehistòria i Antiguitat de la Mediterrània Occidental / Journal of Western Mediterranean Prehistory and Antiquity. The use of both Catalan and English in the subtitle demonstrates the position of the journal as a publication of reference in this geographical area and for a broad timespan, from Prehistory to the beginning of the Middle Ages. The octavo format was recovered in order to make it easier to consult and read, and the policy of publishing two issues a year established. Since then Pyrenae has applied all the criteria to become a leading journal, which implies carefully selecting among the articles submitted for publication, applying a strict and serious policy of double-blind peer-reviewing, absolute punctuality in its publication, and adapting Pyrenae to the rapid development of new technology. The biannual appearance of the journal facilitates dynamic editorial management, enabling on-going research to be published immediately, which is one of the values promoted by the journal itself. In addition, a journal in two parts makes it possible to publish a first number with an in-depth study as well as four or five articles; the second number can also contain two or three articles, a discussion forum if there is a subject for debate or interest, a substantial section of reviews, and the list of doctoral theses and master's degree dissertations, which make it possible to appreciate the research being carried out in the Section of Prehistory and Archaeology of the University of Barcelona.

2009 witnessed a step of great importance for Pyrenae. The CRAI-Centre deRecursos per a l'Aprenentatge i laInvestigació de la Universitat de Barcelona (Resource Centre for Learning and Research of the University of Barcelona) made the effort, thanks to the help provided by the Consorci de Bibliothèques Universitàries de Catalunya (CBUC) (Consortium of University Libraries of Catalonia), to publish on-line the texts published in the forty volumes of Pyrenae that had appeared prior to that date in open access format and thus make them accessible to all users. Since that moment, the articles published have been uploaded to the collaborative repository Revistes Catalanes amb Accés Obert in PDF format, once the printed Edition has appeared, thereby facilitating access to research and its prompt dissemination.

Pyrenae, Revista de Prehistòria i Antiguitat de la Mediterrània Occidental / Journal of Western Mediterranean Prehistory and Antiquity, aims to continue to strive for research excellence, in the same way as its founders did in the mid-20th century, while adapting to the times and the means that science and society place at its disposal.

The journal celebrated its 50th year in 2015, with 46 numbers published to date and a special issue Pyrenae. Número Especial 50è Anniversari 1965-2015, which reflects the state of the research of all the groups of the University of Barcelona dedicated to Prehistory, Ancient History and Archaeology.

=== Exchange History ===
Since its foundation in 1965, Pyrenae has sought to develop a policy aimed at prioritizing the exchange of publications with scholarly institutions around the world. The objective was to build up the holdings of the new library of the Institute of Archaeology and Prehistory of the University of Barcelona, which were later to pass to the Department of Prehistory, Ancient History and Archaeology; the transfer of the Faculty of Geography and History to its present premises in the Raval district, in the heart of the historic core of Barcelona, in 2006, led to the Archaeology Library being integrated within the Biblioteca de la Facultat de Geografia i Història (Library of the Faculty of Geography and History).

The main goal of the publication and of the many exchange agreements was to be able to gain access to newly published works from around the world in the fields of Prehistory, Ancient History and Archaeology as soon as possible; at the same time, Pyrenae was seen as the most suitable vehicle for making the scholarly studies of the researchers at the Institute of Archaeology and Prehistory, and by extension of the graduates and doctors produced by the University of Barcelona more widely known. The exchange of publications was thus one of the key features of the birth of Pyrenae.

Over the course of time, and thanks to Pyrenae, the library’s holdings grew exponentially. The interruption in publication of the journal in 1985, which did not reappear until 1993, was detrimental for the system of exchanges, which had achieved a considerable level of stability. The new phase of Pyrenae that was inaugurated with number 24 in 1993 made it possible to re-establish both national and international exchanges, a policy which has been maintained since that date. This task received the constant attention of Maria del Vilar Vilà i Bota until her retirement in 2008; since then it has been assumed by Pilar García Argüelles.

This policy of publication exchange continues to be of fundamental importance for Pyrenae.

=== The identity of Pyrenae: the origin of its logo ===
Pyrenae is identified by its logo containing a drawing of a vessel. This was the logo of the Institute of Archaeology and Prehistory of the University of Barcelona; as such it was used for its Occasional Publications and was incorporated by the journal in 1993, when the second phase of its publication was undertaken. The vessel is to be found on the so-called ‘Vas de les Naus’ (ship vase) from the Iberian hill-top settlement of Turó d’en Boscà (Badalona). It is a double cone-shaped vessel in grey ware from the Catalan coast (COTCAT) (109 cm high and 108 in diameter) with two handles and incised decoration of two vessels on the sea, which is indicated by wavy lines. The piece can be dated to the 3rd century B.C. This ceramic vessel was donated to the Institute of Archaeology of the University of Barcelona. In 1993, the Department of Prehistory, Ancient History and Archaeology of the University of Barcelona loaned the ‘Vas dels Naus’ to the Museu de Badalona (Badalona Museum; Registry number: MB-4581) and finally, in 2009, full ownership was passed to this Museum. This object, which is mentioned in many publications, was published in the first issue of Pyrenae, cf. Joan Maluquer de Motes, “Una vasija excepcional del poblado ibérico de Mas Boscà”, Pyrenae 1, 1965, 129-138, 6 figs, 2 plates This study was continued, after the discovery of additional sherds, by E. Junyent and V. Baldellou, Una vivienda ibérica de Mas Boscà, Publicaciones Eventuales 21, Instituto de Arqueología y Prehistoria, Universitat de Barcelona, Barcelona 1972 (id. Príncipe de Viana 33,126-127, 1972, p. 5-68). The drawings published by Dr. Maluquer are by the draughtsman Antonio Bregante, and were modified by Ramon Álvarez, incorporating the new sherds found by Junyent and Baldellou. The photographs that can be seen on this page were taken by the photographer A. Guillén.
