= Sander Ravn =

Danish footballer (born 2007)

Personal information
- Full name: Sander Skoubo Sehested Ravn
- Date of birth: 8 April 2007 (age 19)
- Place of birth: Vejle, Denmark
- Position: Midfielder

Team information
- Current team: Vejle
- Number: 26

Youth career
- Bredballe IF
- Vejle

Senior career*
Years	Team	Apps	(Gls)
2025–	Vejle	4	(0)

International career^{‡}
2024–	Denmark U18	3	(0)
- * Club domestic league appearances and goals as of 10 December 2025 ‡ National team caps and goals as of 17:27, 24 May 2025 (UTC)

Sander Skoubo Sehested Ravn (born 8 April 2007) is a Danish professional footballer who plays as a midfielder for the U-19 squad of Danish Superliga club Vejle Boldklub.

== Career ==
=== Vejle Boldklub ===
Ravn grew up in Bredballe, a district in Vejle, and started playing football in Bredballe IF. As an U-10 player, he moved to Vejle Boldklub. Here he worked his way up through the club's youth system and signed his first contract in May 2022 at the age of 15.

In November 2023, 16-year-old Ravn was in the first team for the first time when he sat on the bench in a Danish Cup match against AB. Until January 2025, Ravn played youth football before being selected for the first team squad for a training camp in Turkey.

On January 22, 2025, Ravn signed a new deal with Vejle, running until the end of 2027.

On March 2, 2025, Ravn made his official debut when he replaced Lundrim Hetemi in a 1–3 defeat to Viborg FF in the Danish Superliga.
