= Pontifical Catholic University of Argentina =

Private university in Argentina

Coordinates: 34°36′52.1″S 58°21′56.3″W

Catholic University of Argentina
- Universidad Católica Argentina
- UCA building in Puerto Madero, Buenos Aires
- Type: Private
- Established: 1958; 68 years ago
- Religious affiliation: Roman Catholic
- Chancellor: Abp. Jorge Ignacio García Cuerva
- President: Dr. Miguel Ángel Schiavone
- Students: 24,000
- Location: Puerto Madero, Buenos Aires, Argentina
- Student Government: Student Federation of the Catholic University of Argentina (FEUCA)
- Colors: Navy blue, white
- Website: uca.edu.ar

The Pontifical Catholic University of Argentina (Spanish: Pontificia Universidad Católica Argentina), also known as Catholic University of Argentina (Spanish: Universidad Católica Argentina; UCA), is a private university in Argentina with campuses in the cities of Buenos Aires, Santa Fe, Rosario, Paraná, Mendoza and Pergamino. The main campus is located in Puerto Madero, a modern neighborhood of Buenos Aires.

Its predecessor, the Catholic University of Buenos Aires (1910–1922), was founded by the Argentine episcopate in 1910, but its degrees in law were not recognized by the Argentine government and the institution was closed in 1922.

In 1955, Decree 6403 concerning the freedom of education enabled the creation of private universities with the authority to deliver academic qualifications. In 1956, the bishops decided to create the Catholic University of Argentina, formally founded on March 7, 1958.

Cardinal Jorge Mario Bergoglio was UCA's Grand Chancellor, by virtue of his office as Archbishop of the Roman Catholic Archdiocese of Buenos Aires, the capital of Argentina, until his election in 2013 as Pope Francis. When Mario Aurelio Poli was named Archbishop of Buenos Aires by Pope Francis later in 2013, he became ex officio Grand Chancellor of the University. In May 2013, Pope Francis named Víctor Manuel Fernández, the University's President (the second-highest administrative rank after the Grand Chancellor), as titular archbishop of Tiburnia.

== Accreditation ==
The part-time MBA program taught by the university has been accredited by the London-based Association of MBAs (AMBA) since 1998.

== History ==
=== First foundation: the Catholic University of Buenos Aires ===
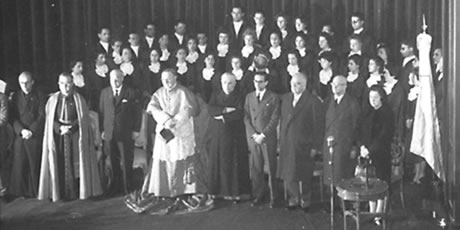
Foundational act of the University, 1910

Like Buenos Aires itself, the Pontifical Catholic University of Argentina was founded twice. The foundation of a catholic university was first discussed in the Eucharistic Congress of 1884. At the time, the Argentine Law 1420 of Common Education had dictated public compulsory, free and secular education in order to guarantee the separation of Church and State and prevent discrimination on the basis of religious adherence.

Eventually the idea lost its momentum, but in 1908 the first Congress of Catholic Youths underlined the importance of a well-rounded, integral education and promoted the foundation of a catholic university "in which students are trained to excel in liberal professions and are taught the core of catholic doctrine". The Argentine Episcopate finally decided in favour of this initiative by founding the Catholic University of Buenos Aires in 1910. The bishops proceeded with the conception of this first university regardless of the poor legislation on private institutions of higher education that the country had at the time.

The Faculty of Law was its first and only one, and the curriculum was largely based on those of public universities plus compulsory courses on philosophy and history. The aforementioned lack of legislation conspired against the procurement of official accreditation and the Catholic University of Buenos Aires was forced to close its doors in 1922, little over a decade after being founded.

=== Second foundation: the Catholic University of Argentina ===
The Argentine Episcopate decided to found the university once again in its plenum in 1956 and two years later, the Catholic University of Argentina was created.

"It was decided to proceed with the foundation of the UCA, adopting the necessary measures to precisely determine its character and structure [...] Therefore, our educational mission incorporates those academic fields that, being the heritage of mankind, intersect in the formation of man."

— UCA, La Fundación de la UCA (1958)

Once the statutes of the institution were promulgated and approved, the university started receiving students to the original faculties:

- Faculty of Philosophy
- Faculty of Law and Political Science
- Faculty of Social and Economic Sciences

== Rankings and reputation ==
According to the QS World University Rankings, UCA is the third best private university in the country and is ranked second in Buenos Aires.

UCA is widely considered to be one of the best institutions of higher education in Argentina. QS World University Rankings has ranked UCA 2nd overall and 1st among private institutions in Argentina in 2013. The university is also ranked 2nd in terms of employer preference.

UCA is also labeled as a "Top Business School" with 4 out of 5 Palmes by EdUniversal. The French consulting company also ranked UCA's Business School 3rd in the nation.

UCA's main campus is located in Puerto Madero, the financial center of downtown Buenos Aires. It is just 500 meters (546 yards) away from Casa Rosada and 3 lines of the Buenos Aires Underground intersect less than 600 meters away.

== Faculties and institutes ==
=== In Buenos Aires ===
==== Faculties ====
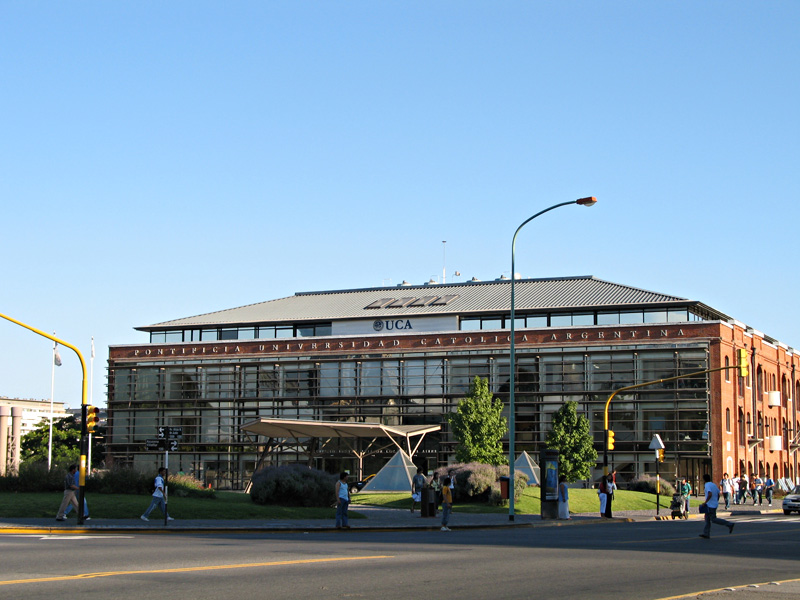
Campus in Buenos Aires

- Faculty of Arts and Musical Sciences
- Faculty of Agricultural Sciences
- Faculty of Economics
- Faculty of Exact Sciences and Engineering
- Faculty of Medical Sciences
- Faculty of Social, Political and Communication Sciences
  - Institute of Political Science and International Relations
  - Institute of Social Communication, Journalism and Advertising
- Faculty of Law
- Faculty of Canon Law
- Faculty of Philosophy and Literature
- Faculty of Psychology and Educational Psychology
- Faculty of Theology

==== Independent Institutes ====
- Institute of Bioethics
- Institute of Culture and University Extension
- Institute of Spirituality and Pastoral Action
- Institute for Marriage and Family
- Institute for the Integration of Knowledge
- Institute of Social Sciences Research (IICS)
- CEHAO

=== In Paraná ===
- Faculty "Teresa of Avila"

=== In Rosario ===
- Faculty of Law and Social Sciences
- Faculty of Economics
- School of Chemical and Engineering "Fray R. Bacon"
- Pergamino Regional Center

=== In Mendoza ===
- Faculty of Humanities and Education
- Faculty of Economics "San Francisco"

== Main Publications ==
- Ancient Near East Monographs
- Antiguo Oriente
- Bridging Cultures
- Damqatum
- Ensayos de Política Económica
- Prudentia Iuris
- Revista de Psicología
- Sapientia
- Temas de Historia Argentina y Americana
- Teología

== International UCA ==
In December 2000, the Office of International Relations was established, renamed to International Relations and Academic Cooperation in 2006, with the aim of promoting the internationalization of all components of the university. From that time the institution increased its links with institutions abroad, including:

=== America ===
- Canada: Queen's University, McGill University, Université de Montréal
- USA: Boston College, American University, University of Illinois at Urbana-Champaign, University of Washington (Seattle), University of Arizona, University of North Carolina-Chapel Hill, Georgia Institute of Technology, University of Richmond, University of San Francisco, Washington College, State University of New York at New Paltz, East Carolina University
- Mexico: Universidad Anahuac, Universidad de las Americas in Puebla, Universidad de Monterrey
- Panama: Universidad Católica Santa María La Antigua (USMA)
- Colombia: Pontificia Universidad Javeriana, Universidad del Rosario
- Brazil: Universidade de São Paulo (USP), Universidade de Brasília (UnB), PUC-Rio, PUC-SP, PUCRS, PUC-Minas
- Paraguay: Universidad Católica Nuestra Señora de la Asunción
- Chile: Pontificia Universidad Católica de Chile (PUC), Pontificia Universidad Católica de Valparaíso (PUCV)
- Uruguay: Universidad Católica del Uruguay, Universidad de la República

=== Europe ===
- Spain: Universidad Pontificia Comillas, Universidad Carlos III, Universidad Rey Juan Carlos, Universitat Politècnica de València, Universidad de Santiago de Compostela
- France: Institut Catholique d'Études Supérieures (I.C.E.S.), Institut de Sciences Politiques (Paris SciencePo), Université Paris Dauphine, Université Paris 5 - René Descartes, Université d'Orléans, Université de Grenoble Pierre Mendès France, Université de Lyon 3, École Supérieure de Commerce de Clermont-Ferrand, École Supérieure Commerce Rouen, Grenoble Ecole Superieure de Commerce, École Supérieure de Commerce Marseille, École Supérieure de Commerce Dijon, Audentia
- United Kingdom: University of Leeds, University of Birmingham, University College London (UCL)
- Italy: Università di Torino, Università Cattolica del Sacro Cuore, Pontifical Lateran University (PUL), Università di Firenze, Università di Pisa, II Università di Roma "Tor Vergata"
- Germany: Universität Tübingen, Universität Mannheim, Technische Universität Darmstadt, WHU – Otto Beisheim School of Management, Frankfurt School of Finance & Management (HfB), Bucerius Law School
- Switzerland: Université de Genève
- The Netherlands: Tilburg University, University of Amsterdam
- Sweden: Lunds Universitet

=== Asia ===
- China: Peking University
- South Korea: Sogang University
- Singapore: Singapore Management University (SMU)

=== Oceania ===
- Australia: Macquarie University, University of Technology Sydney
- New Zealand: University of Otago, Victoria University of Wellington

== Notable professors and researchers ==
- Alicia Daneri, Egyptologist.
- Olga Fernández Latour de Botas, Folklorist.
- Perla Fuscaldo, Egyptologist.
- Alberto Ginastera, Composer
- Marta Lambertini, Composer.
- Santiago Legarre, Lawyer.
- Jorge María Mejía, Cardinal.
- Mario Aurelio Poli, Cardinal.
- Eduardo A. Roca, Lawyer.
- Ariel Edgardo Torrado Mosconi, Bishop.

== Notable alumni ==
- Mauricio Macri, former President of Argentina.
- María Eugenia Vidal, former Governor of Buenos Aires Province.
- Alfonso Prat-Gay, former Minister of the Treasury of Argentina.
- José Luis Machinea, former Minister of Treasury of Argentina.
- Javier González Fraga, former President of the Central Bank of the Argentine Republic.
- Guillermo Dietrich, former Minister of Transport of Argentina.
- Máxima Zorreguieta, Queen of the Netherlands.
- Soledad Fandiño, an Argentine model and actress.
- Eduardo Costantini, founder and president of the Museum of Latin American Art of Buenos Aires.
- Rafael Grossi General Director of the International Atomic Energy Agency.
- Daniel Hadad CEO of Infobae.
- Alec Oxenford, co-founder of OLX.
- María Julia Alsogaray, was National Deputy for the City of Buenos Aire.
- Ramón Puerta, former Governor of Misiones Province.
- Germán Garavano, former Minister of Justice of Argentina.
- Jorge Sapag, former Governor of Neuquen Province.
- Ricardo Buryaile, former Minister of Agriculture of Argentina.
- Sandra Mihanovich, an Argentine singer and actress.
- Ana Becciu, poet
- María Iberzábal Murphy, an Argentine politician
