= Society for American Archaeology =

Professional association

Society for American Archaeology (SAA)
- Established: January 1, 1932; 94 years ago
- Headquarters: Washington, D.C., U.S.
- Website: www.saa.org

The Society for American Archaeology (SAA) is a professional association for the archaeology of the Americas. It was founded in 1934 and its headquarters are in based in Washington, D.C. As of 2019, it has 7,500 members. Its current president is Christopher Dore. Notable past presidents include Dean R. Snow.

The mission statement of the SAA is to expand understanding and appreciation of humanity's past as achieved through systematic investigation of the archaeological record; promote research, stewardship of archaeological resources, public and professional education, and the dissemination of knowledge; and serve the public interest. It organizes a major academic conference every year and publishes several journals, including American Antiquity.

== Annual meetings ==
The first annual meeting took place in December 1935 in Andover, Massachusetts, and has taken place every year since. Only one meeting, the 8th annual meeting of 1943, did not physically take place. According to the most recent annual meeting program book, "because of travel difficulties & other wartime restrictions, the 1943 Annual Meeting was conducted by mail".

Since 2000, the SAA's annual meetings have been held in:

- 65th: Philadelphia, Pennsylvania, April 2000
- 66th: New Orleans, Louisiana, April 2001
- 67th: Denver, Colorado, March 2002
- 68th: Milwaukee, Wisconsin, April 2003
- 69th: Montreal, Quebec, March–April 2004
- 70th: Salt Lake City, Utah, March–April 2005
- 71st: San Juan, Puerto Rico, April 2006
- 72nd: Austin, Texas, April 25–29, 2007
- 73rd: Vancouver, British Columbia, March 26–30, 2008
- 74th: Atlanta, Georgia, April 22–26, 2009
- 75th: St. Louis, Missouri, April 14–18, 2010
- 76th: Sacramento, California, March 30 – April 3, 2011
- 77th: Memphis, Tennessee, April 18–22, 2012
- 78th: Honolulu, Hawaii, April 3–7, 2013
- 79th: Austin, Texas, April 23–27, 2014

== 2019 annual meeting controversy ==
In April 2019, the SAA's 84th annual meeting in Albuquerque, New Mexico, was the subject of controversy due to the attendance of David Yesner, a former professor of archaeology at the University of Alaska Anchorage (UAA). Prior to the meeting, a Title IX investigation at UAA had found Yesner guilty of "decades of sexual misconduct". UAA banned him from its premises and any affiliated events, and advised students to contact the police if they saw him on campus. Despite this, Yesner was allowed to attend the SAA annual meeting. As a result, three targets of Yesner's harassment had to leave the meeting early. The science journalist Michael Balter was also barred from the meeting by its organizers, apparently because he had approached Yesner and asked him to leave. Balter had traveled to the meeting to appear on a panel on the Me Too movement in archaeology.

An open letter to the SAA leadership criticizing its handling of the incident was signed by almost 2000 archaeologists. Kristina Killgrove also resigned her position as the chair of the SAA's media relations committee in protest. The SAA subsequently issued an apology but claimed that it did not receive complaints about Yesner's presence at the conference until its second day, and acted upon them "within hours".

== Publications ==
The SAA publishes American Antiquity, Latin American Antiquity and Advances in Archaeological Practice. It also publishes a magazine, the SAA Archaeological Record, previously known as the Bulletin of the Society for American Archaeology (until 1990) and the SAA Bulletin (1990–2001).
