= Advances in Archaeological Practice =

Peer-reviewed academic journal

- Discipline: Archaeology
- Language: English
- Edited by: Allison Mickel

Publication details
- History: 2013–present
- Publisher: Cambridge University Press
- Frequency: Quarterly
- Open access: Yes
- Impact factor: 1.9 (2023)

Standard abbreviations
- ISO 4: Adv. Archaeol. Pract.

Indexing
- ISSN: 2326-3768

Links
- Journal homepage

Advances in Archaeological Practice is a quarterly peer-reviewed academic journal published by Cambridge University Press, on behalf of the Society for American Archaeology, a professional organization dedicated to advancing archaeology, heritage, and practice.

== History ==
Advances in Archaeological Practice is a quarterly, full-color digital journal that publishes articles sharing 'creative solutions to challenges in the practice of archaeology globally'. The journal was first conceived during a special strategic meeting of the SAA in 2010, where board members noted a gap in the publishing opportunities currently available for archaeologists and SAA members, particularly applied archaeologists. Many journals offered venues for publishing original research, but there were comparatively fewer places to share methods and strategies with relevance across sectors of archaeological practice. The purpose of Advances is therefore to provide a venue for archaeologists to publish short, peer-reviewed, methodologically oriented articles. On August 23, 2024, the journal flipped from a hybrid open access model to a gold open access model.

A unique feature of this journal is the 'digital reviews' section. These articles are a 1500-2000 word critical evaluation of one (or a series of) digital application(s) developed for archaeology and heritage audiences. Previous articles in this section have reviewed heritage/archaeology online exhibitions, video games, digital archives, podcasts, chatbots, news programmes, Sketchfab, Instagram, Facebook, crowdsourcing sites, and more generally on VR and AR applications, and online public courses (e.g. MOOCs).

In September 2024, Advances in Archaeological Practice introduced Ben Marwick as the inaugural Associate Editor of Reproducibility. The purpose of this editorial role is to ' validate and publicly celebrate authors’ efforts to share high-quality, useful research to benefit the community long into the future' The Associate Editor for Reproducibility is tasked with recreating any data analysis or visualizations produced using R, Python, or similar open-source programming. When analyses or visualizations are possible to reproduce, articles feature a Reproducibility Statement and a Digital Badge. If the code does not work, authors and the Associate Editor work together to fix the code, or the Reproducibility Statement will note the issue. The process of reproducing results is not required of authors to Advances; this process was initiated to incentivize and highlight transparent, reliable research and therefore authors may opt in or out.

== Past Editors ==
- Christopher D. Dore (2013–2016)
- Sarah Herr (2016–2025)
- Christina Rieth (2016–2025)
- Sjoerd van der Linde (2016–2025)
- Peter J. Cobb (Digital Reviews Editor, 2021-2026)
- Sara Perry (Digital Reviews Editor, 2017–2020)
