= Ostraka (journal) =

Academic journal

- Discipline: Classical-world archaeology
- Language: Italian

Publication details
- History: 1992–2012
- Publisher: Loffredo on behalf of the Istituto di studi comparati sulle società antiche (Italy)
- Frequency: Semi-annual

Standard abbreviations
- ISO 4: Ostraka

Indexing
- ISSN: 1122-259X
- OCLC no.: 28732942

Ostraka is an academic journal published semiannually from 1992 to 2012 and roughly annually thereafter by the Istituto di studi comparati sulle società antiche of the University of Perugia in Perugia, Italy. It publishes research by professionals into the archaeology of classical antiquity.
