= CEHAO =

Argentinian historical and archeological research institution

Center of Studies of Ancient Near Eastern History
- Type: Private research institute
- Established: 2002
- Location: Buenos Aires
- Affiliations: Pontifical Catholic University of Argentina
- Website: http://www.uca.edu.ar/cehao-en

The Center of Studies of Ancient Near Eastern History (known by its Spanish acronym CEHAO) is a university-based research institution of the Pontifical Catholic University of Argentina, Buenos Aires, Argentina, focused on the history and archaeology of the Ancient Near East. The CEHAO has many periodical publications. The center's flagship is Antiguo Oriente, an annual peer-reviewed journal. CEHAO also publishes, jointly with the Society of Biblical Literature, the open-access peer-reviewed Ancient Near East Monographs (ANEM). Finally, Damqatum, an annual journal aimed at the general public with publications of preliminary high-impact research results.

The CEHAO share research programs and scholars with the Institute of Social Sciences Research (IICS) of the Pontifical Catholic University of Argentina. Egyptologists Alicia Daneri and Perla Fuscaldo, biblical scholars René Krüger, Pablo Andiñach, and Alejandro Botta, assyriologist Andrea Seri, and archaeologist Amir Gorzalczany are researchers in the CEHAO.

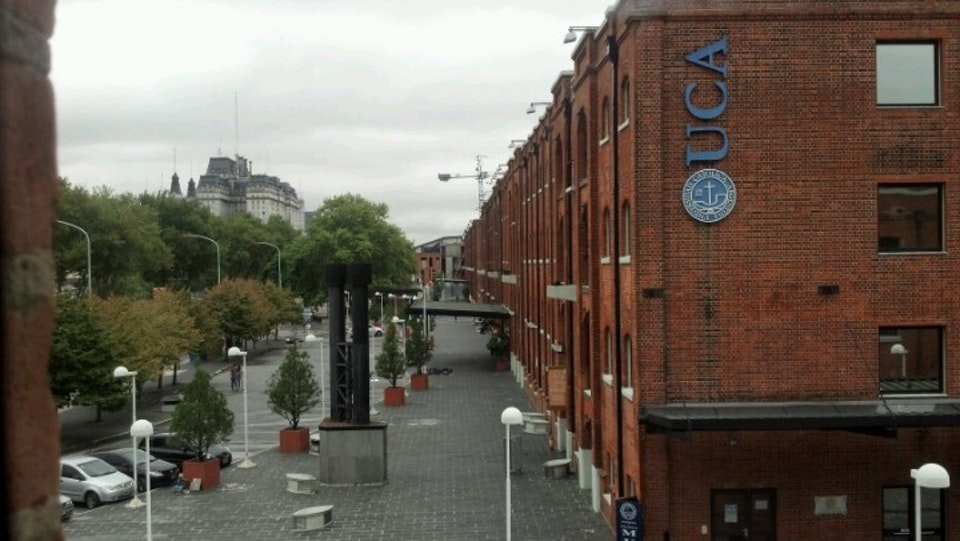
The CEHAO is located in the San Alberto Magno Building, Puerto Madero Campus of the Pontifical Catholic University of Argentina

== Directors ==
- Roxana Flammini (2002-2011, 2017)
- Juan Manuel Tebes (2012-2016 and since 2018)

== Researchers ==
- Alicia Daneri
- Perla Fuscaldo
- René Krüger
- Pablo Andiñach
- Alejandro Botta
- Andrea Seri
- Amir Gorzalczany
