= International Journal of South American Archaeology =

Electronic academic journal

The International Journal of South American Archaeology – IJSA (ISSN 2011-0626) is an eJournal listed by scholarly journal and one of the first fully peer-reviewed electronic journal for archaeology published by Syllaba Press. Its issues include original articles on the archaeology and prehispanic history of South America, including topics such as environmental archaeology, sociocultural archaeology, bioarchaeology, prehispanic art, sociocultural diversity, contemporary peoples and their archaeological remains. Papers may also address general theoretical and methodological issues relevant to archaeology, especially in South America.

This eJournal published two numbers for year (February and September) articles, reports, and reviews may be in Spanish, Portuguese or English and is edited by the Archaeodiversity Research Group, Universidad del Valle, Cali, Colombia, and is sponsored by Syllaba Press, the Archaeological Museum “Julio César Cubillos”, and Taraxacum Foundation.
