= Ana Becciu =

Argentinian author and translator (born 1948)

- Born: Ana María Becciu; 1948 (age 77–78); Buenos Aires, Argentina
- Education: Universidad Católica Argentina; University of Barcelona
- Occupations: Poet, editor, translator

Ana María Becciu or Becciú (born 1948) is an Argentine poet, editor and translator. Born in Buenos Aires, she studied at the Universidad Católica Argentina. In the mid-1970s, she worked with the writers Eduardo Galeano and Augusto Roa Bastos. Moving to Europe in 1976, she continued her studies at University of Barcelona and at the Sorbonne in Paris. She worked for many years as a translator with the United Nations.

Becciu is also a major literary translator and editor. She supervised the publication of the complete poems of Jorge Manrique, and she was also editor of the complete works of Alejandra Pizarnik, published in three volumes. Her translations include authors such as Djuna Barnes, Pascal Quignard, Antonin Artaud and Allen Ginsberg. She has won several prizes, among them the Ángel Crespo Prize for her translation of Patrizia Runfola.
