= Danish Journal of Archaeology =

Academic journal

Danish Journal of Archaeology, formerly the Journal of Danish Archaeology is an open-access peer-reviewed academic journal that was established in 1982. It is published by Routledge.
