= Estudios Atacameños =

- Discipline: Archaeology, social anthropology, bioanthropology, history
- Language: English, Spanish
- Edited by: Alejandro Garcés

Publication details
- History: 1973–present
- Publisher: Instituto de Arqueología y Antropología (Catholic University of the North) (Chile)
- Frequency: Biannual
- Open access: Yes
- License: CC BY 4.0
- Impact factor: 0.581 (2020)

Standard abbreviations
- ISO 4: Estud. Atacameños

Indexing
- ISSN: 0716-0925 (print); 0718-1043 (web)
- LCCN: 79648677
- JSTOR: 07160925
- OCLC no.: 809603759

Links
- Journal homepage; Online access; Online archive

Estudios Atacameños is a biannual peer-reviewed academic journal on anthropology, archaeology, and the history of South America. The journal is published by the Instituto de Arqueología y Antropología of the Catholic University of the North and the editor-in-chief is Alejandro Garcés (Catholic University of the North). The journal was established by Jesuits missionary Gustavo Le Paige and George Serracino.

== Abstracting and indexing ==
- Arts and Humanities Citation Index
- Current Contents/Social And Behavioral Sciences
- EBSCO databases
- International Bibliography of Periodical Literature
- International Bibliography of the Social Sciences
- Scopus
- Social Sciences Citation Index

According to the Journal Citation Reports, the journal has a 2020 impact factor of 0.581.
