= Gian Pietro Brogiolo =

Italian medieval archaeologist (1946-)

Gian Pietro Brogiolo (Polpenazze del Garda, Brescia, 1946) is professor of Medieval archaeology at the University of Padua and editor-in-chief of the European Journal of Post-Classical Archaeologies. He is one of the founders of the journals Archeologia Medievale and Archeologia dell'Architettura.

== Selected publications ==
- The idea and ideal of the town between late antiquity and the early middle ages. Leiden: Brill Publishers, 1999. (Editor with Bryan Ward-Perkins) ISBN 978-9004109018
- Atti del secondo congresso nazionale di archeologia medievale. All'insegna Del Giglio, 2000. (Editor) ISBN 978-8878141711
- Le origini della città medievale. Sap, 2011
