= Archaeologia Polona =

Academic journal

- Discipline: Archaeology
- Language: English
- Edited by: Dagmara H. Werra

Publication details
- History: 1958–present
- Publisher: Polish Academy of Sciences
- Frequency: Annually

Standard abbreviations
- ISO 4: Archaeol. Pol.

Indexing
- ISSN: 0066-5924

Links
- Journal homepage; Online access

Archaeologia Polona is an academic journal of archaeology published in English annually since 1958 by the Institute of Archaeology and Ethnology of the Polish Academy of Sciences. The journal focuses on contemporary archaeology with particular respect to Poland.

== See also ==
- Prehistory and protohistory of Poland
