= Cretica Chronica =

Peer-reviewed academic journal

- Cover the 2013 issue of Cretica Chronica
- Language: Greek, English, French, German, or Italian

Publication details
- History: 1947–1973; 1986–1990; 2011–present
- Publisher: Society of Cretan Historical Studies (Greece)
- Frequency: Annually

Standard abbreviations
- ISO 4: Cretica Chron.

Indexing
- ISSN: 0454-5206
- LCCN: 53017693
- OCLC no.: 889570392

Links
- Journal homepage

Cretica Chronica or Kretika Chronika (Greek: Κρητικά Χρονικά; Cretan annals) is a peer-reviewed academic journal published annually by the Society of Cretan Historical Studies (Greek: Εταιρία Κρητικών Ιστορικών Μελετών) on the history, archaeology, culture, and folklore of the island of Crete. The journal was established in 1947, and is published in Heraklion, Greece. The current editor-in-chief is Alexis Kalokerinos. Articles are published in English, French, German, Greek, or Italian.

Andreas G. Kalokerinos served as Chronica's editor-in-chief from its inception until 1973, for a total of 25 volumes. Two further volumes were published in 1986 and 1987 by Crete University Press, and two more in 1988–1990 by the Vikelaia Municipal Library of Heraklion, along with a volume of indices in 1994. The journal was revived in 2011, publishing one issue per year, with publication undertaken by the Society of Cretan Historical Studies.
