= Society of Cretan Historical Studies =

The Society of Cretan Historical Studies (Greek: Εταιρεία Κρητικών Ιστορικών Μελετών (ΕΚΙΜ)) is a research society based in Heraklion, Crete, with the aim of “supporting and promoting Cretan studies in the fields of archaeology, history, ethnography, language and literature from early Christian times onwards”. It was founded on 7 October 1951.

== Activities ==
The Society runs the Historical Museum of Crete in Heraklion, which it founded in 1953. It also administers the Menelaos Parlamas Museum of Rural Life and the Theano Metaxa-Kanakaki Weaving Collection.The Society also established and maintains the Cretan Place Name Archive with over 20,000 toponyms. In addition, it organizes International Cretan Studies Congresses since 1961, publishes the Cretica Chronica journal (since 2011) and a series of other publications, and engages in various educational and scholarly activities.
