= Dialektikê =

- Discipline: Archaeology
- Language: French
- Edited by: Georges Laplace

Publication details
- Former name(s): Cahiers de typologie analytique
- History: 1973–1987
- Publisher: Centre de palethnographie stratigraphique d'Arudy (France)
- Frequency: Annually
- Open access: Yes

Standard abbreviations
- ISO 4: Dialektikê

Indexing
- Dialektikê
- ISSN: 1169-0046
- OCLC no.: 473422925
- Cahiers de typologie analytique
- ISSN: 1147-114X

Links
- Online access

Dialektikê: Cahiers de typologie analytique was an academic journal of archaeology published by the "Centre de palethnographie stratigraphique d'Arudy" from 1973 to 1987, with Georges Laplace as the editor-in-chief. It was the successor of an earlier journal entitled Cahiers de typologie analytique, published in 1972. The papers published in Dialektikê were mostly based on the presentations given to the "International seminars on typology" that Laplace organised yearly in Arudy. The papers were mostly about the methods and the theory of prehistoric archaeology, with a particular focus on lithic analysis and quantitative methods. However, some articles also addressed issues in geology, climatology, computer science, and linguistics.

In 2019, Dialektikê was digitalised and published online on the Zenodo repository and on the Internet Archive.
