= Archeologia Medievale =

Peer-reviewed academic journal

- Discipline: archaeology
- Language: Italian

Publication details
- Frequency: annual

Standard abbreviations
- ISO 4: Archeol. Mediev.

Indexing
- ISSN: 0390-0592 (print); 2039-280X (web)

Archeologia Medievale is a peer-reviewed academic journal of post-classical archaeology and the history of material culture in the pre-industrial age. The journal was founded by Riccardo Francovich. It is indexed in SCOPUS, International Bibliography or Art, Periodicals Index Online, and DIALNET.
