= Norwegian Archaeological Review =

Academic journal

- Discipline: Archaeology
- Language: English
- Edited by: Knut Andreas Bergsvik

Publication details
- History: 1968-present
- Publisher: Routledge
- Frequency: Biannually

Standard abbreviations
- ISO 4: Nor. Archaeol. Rev.

Indexing
- ISSN: 0029-3652 (print); 1502-7678 (web)

Links
- Journal homepage

Norwegian Archaeological Review is a peer-reviewed academic journal of archaeology. It was established in 1968 and is published biannually by Routledge.
