= Ancient Near East Monographs =

- Discipline: History, archaeology
- Language: Spanish, English, French, Portuguese
- Edited by: Jeffrey Stackert, Juan Manuel Tebes

Publication details
- History: 2008–present
- Publisher: Society of Biblical Literature - CEHAO

Standard abbreviations
- ISO 4: Anc. Near East Monogr.

Indexing
- ISSN: 1851-8761

Links
- Journal homepage

Ancient Near East Monographs is an open-access monograph series focused on the ancient Near East, including ancient Israel and its literature, from the early Neolithic to the early Hellenistic eras. It is published jointly by the Society of Biblical Literature and the Center of Studies of Ancient Near Eastern History (CEHAO). The Society publishes books and journals.

== Editors ==
- Ehud Ben Zvi (2008–2015), Alan Lenzi (2016–2018), Jeffrey Stackert (2018–2024), Lauren Monroe (since 2025)
- Roxana Flammini (2008–2015), Juan Manuel Tebes (since 2016)

== See also ==
- Journal of Biblical Literature
- Review of Biblical Literature
- Antiguo Oriente
