= Antiguo Oriente =

Peer-reviewed academic journal

- Discipline: History and Archaeology of the Ancient Near East
- Language: English, French, Spanish

Publication details
- History: 2003–present
- Publisher: CEHAO, Archaeopress (Argentina)

Standard abbreviations
- ISO 4: Antig. Oriente

Indexing
- ISSN: 1667-9202

Links
- Journal homepage

Antiguo Oriente is an annual peer-reviewed academic journal published by the Center of Studies of Ancient Near Eastern History (CEHAO) (Pontifical Catholic University of Argentina, Buenos Aires). It is one of the few scholarly journals in the Spanish-speaking world that focus on the ancient Near East (as opposed to journals focused on specific fields, such as Egyptology and biblical studies).

The journal covers the history of societies of the ancient Near East and the Eastern Mediterranean from the Paleolithic through the Greco-Roman period, publishing articles and book reviews in English, French and Spanish.

It is published and distributed by the Oxford-based specialized publisher Archaeopress.

== Abstracting and indexing ==
The journal is abstracted and indexed in many bibliographic databases, including Scimago, Emerging Sources Citation Index (ESCI) and MIAR.

== Editors-in-Chief ==
The following persons are or have been editors-in-chief:

- Roxana Flammini (2003-2011)
- Juan Manuel Tebes (2012-2018)
- Romina Della Casa (since 2018)

== See also ==
- Damqatum
- Ancient Near East Monographs
- List of history journals
- List of theology journals
