= Abington Township =

Abington Township may refer to the following places in the United States:

- Abington Township, Mercer County, Illinois
- Abington Township, Wayne County, Indiana
- Abington Township, Lackawanna County, Pennsylvania, the former name for Waverly Township (Scranton area)
- Abington Township, Montgomery County, Pennsylvania (Philadelphia area)

== See also ==
- North Abington Township, Pennsylvania
- West Abington Township, Pennsylvania
- South Abington Township, Pennsylvania
- Abington (disambiguation)
- Abingdon (disambiguation)
