= Ankersen =

Ankersen is a Danish surname. Notable people with the surname include:

- Jakob Ankersen (born 1990), Danish footballer
- Peter Ankersen (born 1990), Danish footballer
- Rasmus Ankersen (born 1983), Danish author and football director

== See also ==
- Andersen
