= King Dick =

King Dick may refer to:

- King Dick (film) (Italian: Il nano e la strega), a 1973 Italian animated adult movie
- Mechanics tools made by the Abingdon King Dick company
- Derisive nickname for New Zealand prime minister Richard Seddon
