= Benjamin Schmedes =

German footballer and executive (born 1985)

Personal information
- Date of birth: 28 February 1985 (age 41)
- Place of birth: Hanover, West Germany
- Height: 1.85 m (6 ft 1 in)
- Position: Centre-back

Team information
- Current team: Deutsche Fußball Liga (sporting director)

Youth career
- Koldinger SV
- Germania Grasdorf
- –2001: Hannover 96
- 2001–2004: Werder Bremen

Senior career*
| Years | Team | Apps | (Gls) |
| 2004–2005 | Werder Bremen II | 0 | (0) |
| 2005–2006 | Hannover 96 II | 0 | (0) |
| 2006–2008 | SV Ramlingen/Ehlershausen | 45 | (0) |
| 2009–2010 | Eintracht Norderstedt 03 | 30 | (2) |
| Total | | 75 | (2) |
- * Club domestic league appearances and goals

Benjamin Schmedes (born 28 February 1985) is a German football executive and former player. Since July 2026 he has been Executive Vice President Sports and a member of the management board of the Deutsche Fußball Liga (DFL), the organisation that runs the Bundesliga.

A centre-back whose playing career was spent largely in the German lower divisions, Schmedes joined Hamburger SV in 2009 after completing a master's degree in sport management, and became the club's head of scouting in 2014. He left in December 2017 to become sporting director of VfL Osnabrück, then in the 3. Liga, where he oversaw promotion to the 2. Bundesliga in 2019 and was made managing director for sport in 2021. He subsequently spent two years as technical director of Vitesse in the Netherlands, a period dominated by the club's financial collapse, before becoming executive football director of the Danish club Brøndby IF in January 2025.

== Early life and playing career ==
Schmedes was born in Hanover and played youth football for Koldinger SV and Germania Grasdorf before joining the Hannover 96 academy, moving on to Werder Bremen in 2001. A centre-back, he played for Werder Bremen's reserve team in 2004–05 and for Hannover 96 II the following season, without appearing in either club's first team, and then spent two years with SV Ramlingen/Ehlershausen. He finished his playing career with Eintracht Norderstedt, for whom he made 30 appearances and scored twice, by which time he was already working in football administration.

== Executive career ==
=== Hamburger SV ===
After taking a Master of Science in sport management at the German Sport University Cologne, Schmedes joined Hamburger SV in January 2009 as an assistant to the executive board. When the club's professional department was spun off into a separate company, he took charge of its scouting department, a role he held from November 2014.

In November 2017 he asked to be released from his contract early in order to join VfL Osnabrück, and Hamburg agreed; the club's sporting director Jens Todt said that Hamburg regretted letting him go but had not wanted to deny him the step.

=== VfL Osnabrück ===
Schmedes took up a newly created position as sporting director at third-division Osnabrück on 1 December 2017, with responsibility for both the professional and youth sections and a contract until 2021. Relegation to the Regionalliga was averted in his first half-season, and in the 2018–19 season the club won the division under head coach Daniel Thioune to return to the 2. Bundesliga after eight years. Osnabrück then survived their first season back.

On 1 January 2021 he was promoted to managing director for sport, a post the club had not previously had. Club president Manfred Hülsmann said Schmedes had taken over in a precarious sporting situation and singled out the promotion and the measures introduced across the professional and youth set-ups. That season ended in relegation through the play-off against FC Ingolstadt 04, and Schmedes asked to be released from his contract, leaving with immediate effect in June 2021 after three and a half years. He said the decision had not been an easy one but that the club could now reorganise itself; Hülsmann described the request as well founded and said the club would have preferred to continue with him.

=== Vitesse ===
Schmedes was appointed technical director of Eredivisie club Vitesse on 15 February 2022, succeeding his compatriot Johannes Spors, who had left for Genoa. He signed a contract to the summer of 2024, saying that he had deliberately taken time after leaving Osnabrück before deciding on his next move. Of the Arnhem club he said: "Vitesse came across to me as a professional and warm club, with a great history. I am attracted to the football philosophy and the potential of the club, the belief in more." General director Pascal van Wijk said that Schmedes stood for a strong vision and a modern approach, and that the appointment fitted the path Vitesse had taken.

His two years at Arnhem were dominated by the collapse of the club's finances rather than by events on the pitch. Vitesse had been owned by Valeriy Oyf, and reporting by The Guardian indicated that Roman Abramovich had secretly funded and controlled the club through offshore companies. Oyf withdrew, and Vitesse were left with no money to spend on players and became the subject of a protracted takeover process. Schmedes appointed Phillip Cocu as head coach in succession to Thomas Letsch. Cocu kept Vitesse in the Eredivisie in 2022–23 but resigned in November 2023, and Edward Sturing took over on an interim basis.

On 19 December 2023, Schmedes told the club's supervisory board that he would not extend his expiring contract. He did so on the evening that around a hundred Vitesse supporters travelled to the Royal Dutch Football Association (KNVB) headquarters in Zeist to protest at the delay in deciding the club's licence. Voetbal International described the decision as unsurprising and reported that he had been criticised within the club, particularly for failing to sign a goalscorer, while questioning what he could still achieve in his remaining six months at a club with nothing to spend. Vitesse were relegated on 19 April 2024 after the KNVB licensing committee deducted 18 points, leaving them on −1 and ending 35 consecutive seasons in the Eredivisie.

=== Brøndby ===
Danish Superliga club Brøndby IF named Schmedes as football director on 30 December 2024, in succession to Carsten V. Jensen, who had been dismissed that October. He took up the post on 1 January 2025, his first task being to appoint a head coach after the dismissal of Jesper Sørensen. Vice-chairman Scott McLachlan said that Schmedes brought strong experience from several footballing environments, while Schmedes said that talent development had always been a cornerstone of his career and that he saw it as a decisive part of the club's long-term success. The appointment drew scrutiny in Denmark over the Vitesse affair, Tipsbladet observing that he arrived from one of the largest scandals in Dutch football. He confirmed Frederik Birk, who had taken temporary charge, as head coach, and Brøndby finished third in the Superliga in the 2024–25 season.

Part of his brief was to change the club's approach to the transfer market, and the summer of 2025 produced the largest sales in Brøndby's history. Mathias Kvistgaarden joined Norwich City in July after 126 appearances and 47 goals, and Yuito Suzuki, Jacob Rasmussen, Sebastian Sebulonsen and Clement Bischoff were also sold. Schmedes said that the sales had together secured a historic financial gain, with Kvistgaarden and Suzuki the largest contributors, and that the club had to ensure its own young players still had room in the squad. He told kicker that adjusting the transfer strategy had been one of the expectations attached to his appointment.

The scale of the selling brought its own pressure. Birk was dismissed in September 2025 and replaced by the Welshman Steve Cooper, and TV 2 reported that the company behind Brøndby had recorded its largest operating deficit, leaving Schmedes and Cooper to turn the proceeds of the sales into results and into the next generation of saleable players.

On 4 March 2026, Brøndby announced in a stock exchange notice that Schmedes would leave at the end of the season to take up the newly created post of sporting director at the Deutsche Fußball Liga (DFL). He said that it had not been the plan for his time at Brøndby to end that summer, that his family had moved to Denmark only weeks earlier, and that the decision had been anything but easy, but that the opportunity was too great to let pass. Chairman Jan Bech Andersen said that losing good people was a condition of hiring them, and that Schmedes had left a clear imprint on the club's development, particularly on its organisation, its infrastructure and the link between the academy and the first team. He remained in post until the end of the season and helped plan the summer transfer window, but took no part in choosing his successor, saying that the decision belonged to the board. Julius Ohnesorge, the club's technical director, was promoted to replace him on 22 May 2026, the same evening that Cooper was dismissed after a season that ended without European qualification.

=== Deutsche Fußball Liga ===
On 4 March 2026, the DFL announced that Schmedes would join as Executive Vice President Sports and a member of its management board, as part of a strategic realignment of the league body's football operations. Chief executive Marc Lenz said Schmedes had impressed with his expertise and his perspective on German and international football. The appointment was approved unanimously by the supervisory board of DFL GmbH, and Schmedes succeeded Ansgar Schwenken in the board's sporting portfolio.

He took up the role on 1 July 2026, joining a management board also comprising Jörg Degenhart, Jürgen Paepke and Philip Sagioglou, and became responsible at board level for all directorates dealing with sporting or sport-administrative matters, developing sporting policy in conjunction with the DFL's football and youth academy commissions.
