= Draper Tools =

British tool distributor

Draper Tools Ltd
- Type: Private
- Founded: 1919 (as B. Draper & Son Limited)
- Founder: Bert Draper
- Headquarters: Chandler's Ford, UK
- Products: Hand tools, Power tools, Automotive tools
- Website: www.drapertools.com

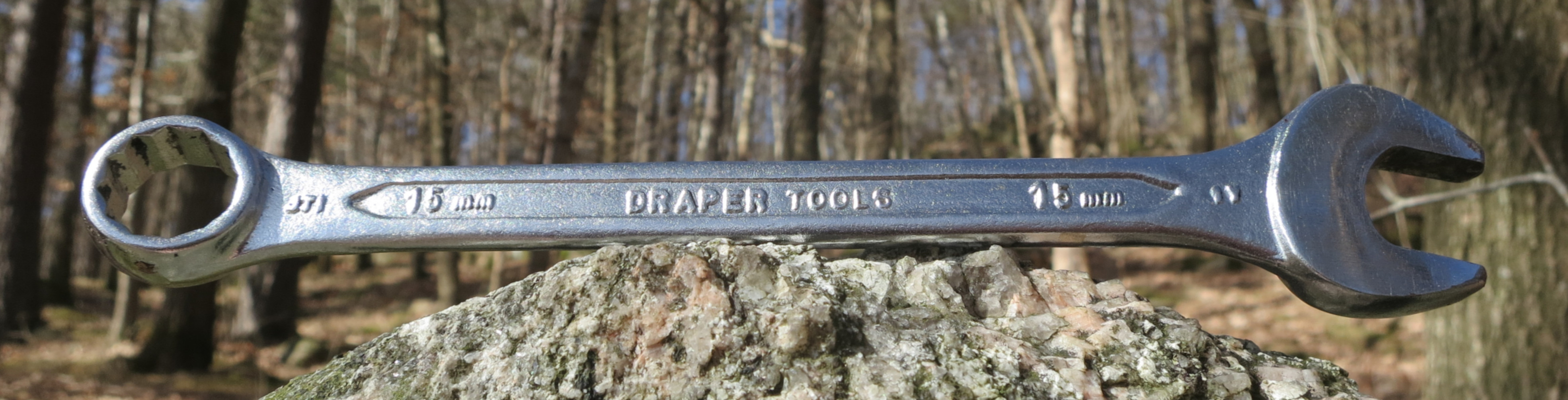
Draper Tools combination wrench from about 1980

Draper Tools Ltd is a British distributor of tools under “Draper” and other brands, for professional and home-consumer use. It is based at a 50,000m^{2} (535,000 sq. ft.) site in Chandler's Ford in Hampshire, England.

== History ==
Draper Tools started in 1919, when Bert Draper ran a business trading government surplus and tools in Kingston upon Thames. The company was called B. Draper & Son Limited, and operated as a wholesaler for brands such as King Dick, as well as its own B.D.S. brand.

The company moved to the Chandler's Ford site in 1963, under the management of Bert's son, Norman Draper. The company has formed international relationships with manufacturers such as Elora Werkzeugfabrik GmbH and Knipex. Since Norman's death in 1994, the company has been run by his son, John Draper.

== Expansion ==
In 2009, the company opened a new 350,000 sq ft industrial unit warehouse facility in North Baddesley Hampshire.

In January 2026, it was announced that Draper Tools had acquired the brands Van Vault and Defender Lighting. Both businesses were formerly part of Toolstream Ltd, which entered administration in December 2025, with Van Vault specialising in vehicle and site security storage solutions and Defender operating in site lighting and power distribution.

== Sponsorship ==
The company was a sponsor of Southampton football club between 1984 and 1993. The company has also been a perimeter board advertiser and sponsor of Southampton's big screen LCD football scoreboard.

Draper sponsored Solent Stars basketball team between 1986 and 1987.

Draper Tools has sponsored Excelr8 Motorsport in the British Touring Car Championship (BTCC) since 2020, having main placements of the liveries of Chris Smiley, Daniel Lloyd, Adam Morgan and Nicolas Hamilton throughout the years.
