= HMS Abingdon =

Minesweeper of the Royal Navy

History

United Kingdom
- Builder: Ailsa Shipbuilding Company, Troon
- Laid down: 30 November 1917
- Launched: 11 June 1918
- Completed: 6 November 1918
- Identification: Pennant number: J23 / N23
- Fate: Beached following bombing 5 April 1942, wreck broken up 1950

General characteristics
- Class & type: Hunt-class minesweeper, Aberdare sub-class
- Displacement: 800 long tons (813 t)
- Length: 213 ft (65 m) o/a
- Beam: 28 ft 6 in (8.69 m)
- Draught: 7 ft 6 in (2.29 m)
- Installed power: 2 × Yarrow boilers; 2,200 ihp (1,600 kW)
- Propulsion: 2 shafts; 2 vertical triple-expansion steam engines
- Speed: 16 knots (30 km/h; 18 mph)
- Complement: 74
- Armament: 1 × QF 4-inch (102 mm) gun; 1 × 76 mm (3.0 in) anti-aircraft gun

HMS Abingdon was a Hunt-class minesweeper of the Aberdare sub-class built for the Royal Navy during World War I.

== Design and description ==
The Aberdare sub-class were enlarged versions of the original Hunt-class ships with a more powerful armament. The ships displaced 800 long tons (810 t) at normal load. They measured 231 feet (70.4 m) long overall with a beam of 26 feet 6 inches (8.1 m). They had a draught of 7 feet 6 inches (2.3 m). The ships' complement consisted of 74 officers and ratings.

The ships had two vertical triple-expansion steam engines, each driving one shaft, using steam provided by two Yarrow boilers. The engines produced a total of 2,200 indicated horsepower (1,600 kW) and gave a maximum speed of 16 knots (30 km/h; 18 mph). They carried a maximum of 185 long tons (188 t) of coal which gave them a range of 1,500 nautical miles (2,800 km; 1,700 mi) at 15 knots (28 km/h; 17 mph).

The Aberdare sub-class was armed with a quick-firing (QF) four-inch (102 mm) gun forward of the bridge and a QF twelve-pounder (76.2 mm) anti-aircraft gun aft. Some ships were fitted with six- or three-pounder guns in lieu of the twelve-pounder.

== Construction and career ==
Following commissioning, Abingdon served with the Aegean Squadron. She remained part of the Aegean Squadron in November 1919, but by January 1920 she was listed as being paid off, although still part of the Mediterranean Fleet. From 1920-1935 she was held in reserve at Malta, then joined the 2nd Minesweeping Flotilla in Malta and Hong Kong. Sweeping was routine until January 1941 when the German Junkers Ju 87s and Ju 88s arrived. Abingdon's captain, Lieutenant Graham Simmers, explains:

It then hotted up with as many as a hundred raids a day, and the Germans laying magnetic mines at night. Abingdon and Fermoy were not equipped to cope with these and things got a bit sticky until the corvette Gloxinia arrived to clear up the mess.

Abingdon was attacked while sweeping, but the ship's slow sweeping speed and steady course seemed to throw the Junkers Ju 87 pilots, as they only scored near-misses; but the Fermoy, bombed while in the dockyard, was a complete write-off. Graham Simmers describes the end of the ship's career:

In January 1942 the situation worsened. We were machine-gunned while at sea and suffered many casualties, until we were ordered to sweep at night, navigating by a small light shown from points on shore so that I could obtain cross-bearings.

This continued until 5 April 1942 when Abingdon, while in Kalkara Creek for repairs, was near-missed by two bombs which broke her back. Lieutenant Simmers had her towed out to Bighi Bay, where she was beached and abandoned. The ship was broken up in 1950.

== See also ==
- Abingdon, Oxfordshire, England
- RAF Abingdon
- USS Abingdon (PC-1237)
