= Dragan Šolak =

Dragan Šolak may refer to:

- Dragan Šolak (businessman) (born 1964), Serbian businessman and media mogul
- Dragan Šolak (chess player) (born 1980), Serbian-Turkish chess grandmaster
