= Abington (surname) =

Abington is a surname. Notable people with the surname include:

- Bill Abington (1921–2014), American politician
- Edward Abington (disambiguation)
- Eustace Abington, 16th-century English politician
- Frances Abington (1737–1815), British actress
- Henry Abington (c.1418–1497), English ecclesiastic and musician
- Thomas Abington (1560–1647), Catholic English antiquary
