= Avington =

Avington may refer to:

- Avington, Berkshire
- Avington, Hampshire

== See also ==
- Abington (disambiguation)
