= Abingdon Road (disambiguation) =

Abingdon Road is a road in Oxford, England.

Abingdon Road may also refer to:

- Abingdon Road (album), 2010, by Abingdon Boys School
- Culham railway station, named "Abingdon Road" from 1844 to 1856

== See also ==
- Abingdon Road Halt railway station
- Abingdon (disambiguation)
