= Abingdon =

Abingdon may refer to:

== Places ==
=== United Kingdom ===
- Abingdon-on-Thames, Oxfordshire
  - Abingdon (UK Parliament constituency) 1558–1983
  - Abingdon railway station (closed)
- Abingdon (ward), electoral ward in Kensington and Chelsea, London

=== United States ===
- Abingdon, Iowa
- Abingdon, Illinois
- Abingdon, Maryland
- Abingdon, Virginia
- Abingdon (plantation), Virginia

=== Other countries ===
- Abingdon Downs, Queensland, Australia
  - Abingdon Airport
- Abingdon, Ontario, Canada
- Abingdon Island, Galápagos Islands, Ecuador

== Other uses ==
- Abingdon (1902 automobile)
- Abingdon (1922 automobile)
- Abingdon Arms, in Oxford, England
- Abingdon Health, a British manufacturer of diagnostic tests
- Abingdon Motorcycles, a former British motorcycle manufacturer
- Abingdon Press, publishing house of the United Methodist Church
- Abingdon Road, in Oxford, England
- Abingdon School, in Abingdon-on-Thames, England
- Earl of Abingdon, a title in the Peerage of England
- USS Abingdon, a U.S. Navy ship

== See also ==
- Abington (disambiguation)
