= Johannes Spors =

German football manager (born 1982)

Personal information
- Date of birth: 17 August 1982 (age 44)
- Place of birth: Heidelberg, Germany

Managerial career
- Years: Team
- 2007–2015: TSG Hoffenheim (analyst)
- 2015–2018: RB Leipzig (scout)
- 2018–2019: Hamburger SV (head of recruitment)
- 2020–2021: Vitesse (sporting director)
- 2021–2023: Genoa (general manager)
- 2021–2025: 777 Partners (sporting director)
- 2025–: Southampton (sporting director)
- 2025–: Sport Republic (sporting director)

Johannes Spors (born 17 August 1982) is a German football sporting director, currently for EFL Championship club Southampton and British sports investment firm Sport Republic.

== Early life ==
Spors was born on 17 August 1982 in Heidelberg, Germany. A native of Heidelberg, Germany, he attended Heidelberg University in Germany.

== Career ==
In 2007, Spors was appointed as an analyst of German side TSG Hoffenheim, where he helped the club sign future Brazil international Roberto Firmino. Eight years later, he was appointed as a scout of German side RB Leipzig, before being appoint head of recruitment of German side Hamburger SV in 2018.

During March 2020, he was appointed sporting director of Dutch side Vitesse. One year later, he was appointed general manager of Italian side Genoa, helping the club achieve promotion from the second tier to the top flight. The same year, he was promoted to sporting director of American private investment company 777 Partners, owners of Italian side Genoa, Australian side Melbourne Victory, Brazilian side Vasco da Gama, German side Hertha BSC, Belgian side Standard Liège, and French side Red Star. Subsequently, he was appointed sporting director of both British sports investment firm Sport Republic, and its English side Southampton, while Sport Republic's other clubs include French side Valenciennes and Turkish side Göztepe.
