= Frederik Birk =

Danish football manager (born 1989)

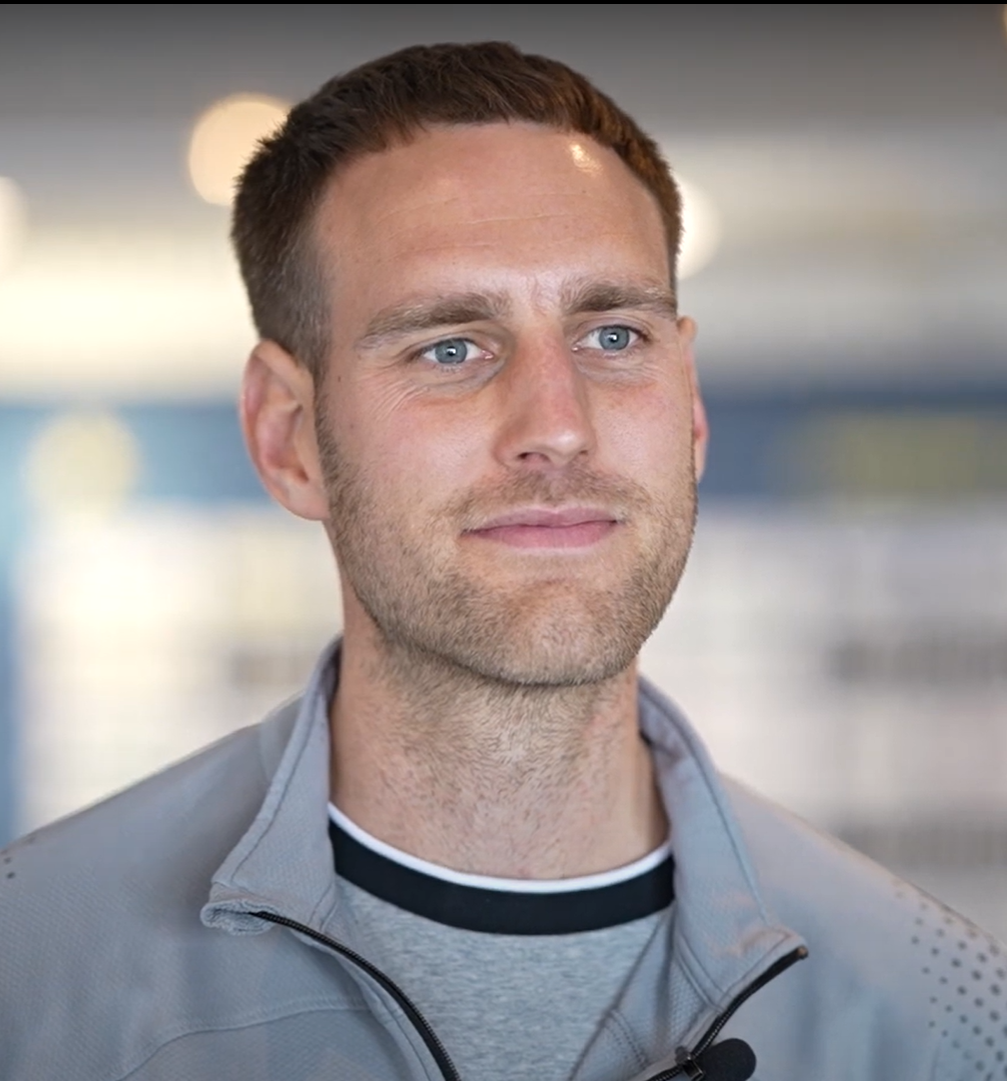
- Birk in 2022

Personal information
- Date of birth: 10 July 1989 (age 37)
- Place of birth: Køge, Denmark

Youth career
- Years: Team
- Køge Boldklub

Managerial career
- 2024–2025: Brøndby

Frederik Birk Christensen (born 10 July 1989) is a Danish professional football manager who last served as head coach of Danish Superliga club Brøndby.

== Early life ==
Frederik Birk was born on 10 July 1989 in Køge, Denmark. An only child, he has credited his upbringing with fostering independence and self-confidence, noting the supportive environment provided by his parents. He played youth football for Køge Boldklub, but did not pursue a senior professional career. Instead, he studied political science at university and later taught global economics and political science at Køge Business College. In 2018, he briefly entered politics as a campaign coordinator for entrepreneur Tommy Ahlers during the latter's successful bid to become Denmark's Minister of Science, Technology, Information and Higher Education in the Lars Løkke Rasmussen III Cabinet.

== Coaching career ==
Birk began his coaching career in 2012 with HB Køge, where he took his first steps into football management. He later described his development as following a "master-apprentice path," shaped by mentorship and practical experience rather than a linear, formal route. In 2015, he joined Brøndby as an assistant coach for the club's under-19 team, a part-time role he balanced with teaching. The opportunity marked a turning point, initiating a long-term association with the club that would define his further career.

Birk was eventually promoted to head coach of Brøndby's under-19 team, where he worked closely with John Ranum Jensen—a veteran figure in the club with over four decades of experience—whom Birk credits as one of his most formative influences, both professionally and personally. He also drew inspiration from Auri Skarbalius.

In 2019, Birk joined Nordsjælland as part of the technical staff under head coach Flemming Pedersen. He served as a performance analyst, providing tactical and statistical insights to support the coaching team. After two years in Farum, he joined Vejle Boldklub in 2021 as assistant coach to Carit Falch. His tenure at Vejle was brief, as both he and Falch departed the club after only five matches, following Falch's dismissal.

On 6 September 2021, Birk returned to Brøndby as chief analyst. In this role, he was tasked with overseeing the club's analytical work while also contributing directly on the training ground, as Brøndby sought to make data analysis a more integrated component of its football operations. Following the departure of assistant coach Jesper Sørensen to the Denmark national under-21 football team, Birk's responsibilities were expanded to include assistant coaching duties under head coach Niels Frederiksen. He remained in the assistant role after Frederiksen was dismissed and Sørensen returned to the club as head coach.

== Managerial career ==
On 11 December 2024, Birk was appointed caretaker head coach of Brøndby following the dismissal of Jesper Sørensen. The decision came after a disappointing autumn campaign, with Brøndby outside the top three in the Superliga. Just four days later, Birk oversaw a dramatic 4–2 home win over AGF in the Danish Cup quarter-final, overturning a first-leg deficit to reach the semi-finals. His high-pressing, attacking approach drew praise and set the tone for his leadership style.

On 8 January 2025, Birk was confirmed as Brøndby's permanent head coach on a multi-year contract. Sporting director Benjamin Schmedes cited Birk's tactical understanding, player relationships, and familiarity with the club as decisive factors. Birk pledged to "attack both the Superliga and the cup tournament with full force" and emphasised his commitment to a dynamic, forward-thinking style of play.

His first league match in charge was a 4–1 win over Viborg on 14 February, marking Brøndby's 60th anniversary. However, inconsistency followed, including draws against bottom-placed Vejle and Lyngby. In late March, Brøndby produced a key 2–0 away victory over Midtjylland, keeping them in contention for a medal position. The club qualified for the championship round but gradually fell behind the title contenders.

Brøndby's cup run ended in the semi-finals with a 5–4 aggregate defeat to Silkeborg in May. Days earlier, they had also lost the derby against FC Copenhagen, effectively ending their hopes of silverware. Birk described the period as "deeply disappointing," while pundit Stig Tøfting criticised him as "the assistant with the knife." Despite setbacks, Birk stated he had the club's backing and remained confident in securing European qualification, noting: "We're in pole position and fully focused on three strong performances in the final games of the season."

On 9 September 2025, Brøndby announced that it had parted company with head coach Birk with immediate effect. The decision came eleven days after the club's elimination in the UEFA Conference League play-off round against Strasbourg. Sporting director Benjamin Schmedes later attributed the change to a lack of stability in performances. Later the same day, former Swansea City, Nottingham Forest and Leicester City manager Steve Cooper was appointed on a contract running to 2028.

== Managerial statistics ==
As of match played 31 August 2025

Managerial record by team and tenure
Team	From	To	Record								Ref.
Team	From	To	G	W	D	L	GF	GA	GD	Win %	Ref.
Brøndby (caretaker)	12 December 2024	31 December 2024	1	1	0	0	4	2	+2	100.00	
Brøndby	8 January 2025	9 September 2025	30	12	9	9	48	44	+4	40.00	
Total			31	13	9	9	52	46	+6	41.94	—
