= Southampton F.C. =

English association football club

Southampton
- Full name: Southampton Football Club
- Nickname: The Saints
- Founded: 21 November 1885; 140 years ago (as St. Mary's Y.M.A.)
- Ground: St Mary's Stadium
- Capacity: 32,384
- Owner: Sport Republic
- Chairman: Dragan Šolak
- Head coach: Tonda Eckert
- League: EFL Championship
- 2025–26: EFL Championship, 4th of 24
- Website: southamptonfc.com

Southampton Football Club is a professional football club based in Southampton, Hampshire, England. The club competes in the Championship, the second tier of English football. Their home ground since 2001 has been St Mary's Stadium, before which it was based at The Dell. The team play in red and white shirts. Their nickname is "The Saints" because of the club's beginnings as a church football team at St Mary's Church. Southampton shares a long-standing South Coast derby rivalry with Portsmouth, in part due to geographic proximity and both cities' respective maritime histories.

Founded in 1885, the club joined the Southern League as Southampton St. Mary's in 1894, dropping the St. Mary's from their name three years later. Southampton won the Southern League on six occasions and were beaten FA Cup finalists in 1900 and 1902, before being invited to become founder members of the Football League Third Division in 1920. They won promotion as Third Division South champions in 1921–22, remaining in the Second Division for 31 years until they were relegated in 1953. Crowned Third Division champions under the stewardship of Ted Bates in 1959–60, they were promoted into the First Division at the end of the 1965–66 campaign. They played top-flight football for eight seasons, but won the FA Cup as a Second Division team in 1976 with a 1–0 victory over Manchester United. Manager Lawrie McMenemy then took the club back into the top-flight with promotion in 1977–78.

Southampton were beaten finalists in the League Cup in 1979 and finished as runners-up in the First Division in 1983–84, three points behind Liverpool. The club were founder members of the Premier League in 1992 and reached another FA Cup final in 2003. Relegation ended their 27-year stay in the top-flight in 2005, and they were relegated down to the third tier in 2009. Southampton won the Football League Trophy in 2010 and won successive promotion from League One and the EFL Championship in 2010–11 and 2011–12. After an 11-year stint in the top flight, during which they were EFL Cup runners-up in 2017, they were relegated in 2023. The club won the 2024 Championship play-off final and returned to the Premier League at the first attempt, but were relegated back to the Championship in April 2025 with seven games remaining.

== History ==
Chart of yearly table positions of Southampton in the Football League

=== Foundation and Southern League (1885–1920) ===
Southampton were originally founded at St. Mary's Church, on 21 November 1885 by members of the St. Mary's Church of England Young Men's Association.

St. Mary's Y.M.A., as they were usually referred to in the local press, played most of their early games on The Common where games were frequently interrupted by pedestrians insistent on exercising their right to roam. More important matches, such as cup games, were played either at the County Cricket Ground in Northlands Road or the Antelope Cricket Ground in St Mary's Road.

The club was originally known as St. Mary's Young Men's Association F.C. (usually abbreviated to "St. Mary's Y.M.A.") and then became simply St. Mary's F.C. in 1887–88, before adopting the name Southampton St. Mary's when the club joined the Southern League in 1894.

For the start of their League career, Saints signed several new players on professional contracts, including Charles Baker, Alf Littlehales and Lachie Thomson from Stoke and Fred Hollands from Millwall. After winning the Southern League title in 1896–97, the club became a limited company and was renamed Southampton F.C.

Southampton won the Southern League championship for three years running between 1897 and 1899 and again in 1901, 1903 and 1904. In 1898, Southampton moved to The Dell, a purpose-built stadium on Milton Road near the city centre. Constructed at an estimated cost of £10,000, the ground hosted its first Southampton match on 3 September 1898, when the club defeated Brighton United 4–1. The Dell remained Southampton's home ground for 103 years, until the club relocated to St Mary's Stadium in 2001.

Southampton reached their first FA Cup final in 1900, becoming one of the first clubs from the Southern League to reach the competition's final. They were defeated 4–0 by Bury at Crystal Palace. The club reached the final again in 1902, drawing 1–1 with Sheffield United before losing the replay 2–1. These appearances came during a period in which Southampton won six Southern League championships between 1897 and 1904.

Reaching those finals gave Southampton recognition, even internationally: in 1909, an Athletic Bilbao representative who played for affiliated team Atlético Madrid purchased 50 Saints shirts during a trip to England, which were shared between the two squads. This early Southampton connection is the reason why the colours of both Spanish clubs became red and white, as they are nowadays.

=== Joining the Football League (1920–1966) ===
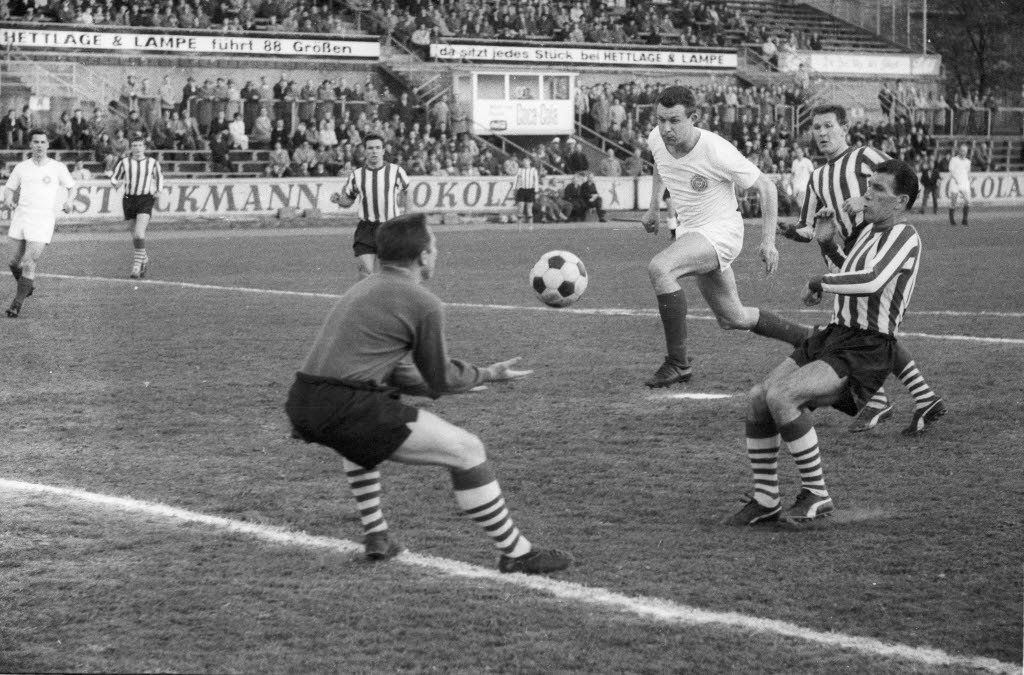
Friendly match at Holstein Kiel, Germany, 15 May 1964

After World War I, Southampton joined the newly formed Football League Third Division, which split into South and North sections a year later. Southampton finished as runner-up in that season. The 1921–22 season ended in triumph with promotion and marked the beginning of a 31-year stay in the Second Division.

The 1922–23 season was a unique "Even Season" – 14 wins, 14 draws and 14 defeats for 42 points, or one point per game. Goals for and against statistics were also equal and the team finished in mid-table.

In 1925 and 1927, they reached the semi-finals of the FA Cup, losing 2–0 and 2–1 to Sheffield United and Arsenal respectively.

Southampton were briefly forced to switch home matches to the ground of their local rivals Portsmouth at Fratton Park during World War II when a bomb landed on The Dell pitch in November 1940, leaving an 18-foot crater which damaged an underground culvert and flooded the pitch.

Promotion was narrowly missed in 1947–48 when they finished in third place, a feat repeated the following season (despite having an eight-point lead with eight games to play) whilst in 1949–50 they narrowly missed out on promotion to second placed Sheffield Wednesday. In the 1948–49 and 1949–50 seasons, Charlie Wayman scored 56 goals, but relegation in 1953 sent Southampton sliding back into Division 3 (South).

Southampton returned to the Second Division in 1959–60, winning the Third Division championship under Ted Bates. Derek Reeves scored 39 of the club's 106 league goals during the campaign. On 27 April 1963, a crowd of 68,000 at Villa Park saw them lose 1–0 to Manchester United in the FA Cup semi-final.

=== Reaching the First Division and cup win (1966–1977) ===
The parade of the FA Cup-winning team

Southampton secured promotion to the First Division for the first time in their history in the 1965–66 season, finishing runners-up in the Second Division under manager Ted Bates. Martin Chivers scored 30 league goals as Southampton recorded 85 goals during the campaign.

For the following campaign Ron Davies arrived to score 43 goals in his first season. Saints stayed among the elite for eight years, with the highest finishing position being seventh place in 1968–69 and again in 1970–71. These finishes were high enough for them to qualify for the Inter-Cities Fairs Cup in 1969–70 (going out in Round 3 to Newcastle United) and its successor, the UEFA Cup in 1971–72, when they went out in the first round to Athletic Bilbao.

In December 1973, Bates stood down to be replaced by his assistant Lawrie McMenemy. The Saints were one of the first victims of the new three-down relegation system in 1974.

Under McMenemy, Southampton rebuilt their squad in the Second Division, signing players including Peter Osgood, Jim McCalliog, Jim Steele and Peter Rodrigues. On 1 May 1976, Southampton won the FA Cup for the first time, defeating First Division side Manchester United 1–0 at Wembley Stadium with Bobby Stokes scoring the winning goal in the 83rd minute. The victory qualified Southampton for the 1976–77 European Cup Winners' Cup, in which they reached the third round before losing 3–2 on aggregate to Anderlecht.

=== Return to First Division (1977–1992) ===
In 1977–78, captained by Alan Ball, Saints finished runners-up in the Second Division (behind Bolton Wanderers) and returned to the First Division. They finished comfortably in 14th place in their first season back in the top flight. In 1978–79, Southampton reached the League Cup final for the first time in their history, losing 3–2 to Nottingham Forest at Wembley Stadium.

In 1980, Southampton manager Lawrie McMenemy signed two-time European Footballer of the Year Kevin Keegan from Hamburger SV. Keegan joined a squad which included Alan Ball, Mick Channon, Phil Boyer and Charlie George. In the 1980–81 season, Southampton scored 76 league goals and finished sixth in the First Division, their highest league placing at the time.

During the 1981–82 season, Southampton challenged for the First Division title and occupied first place for part of the campaign. However, a decline in results towards the end of the season saw the club finish seventh, with Liverpool winning the championship. Keegan scored 26 league goals in 41 appearances and was named PFA Players' Player of the Year for his performances. He departed Southampton in 1982 to join Newcastle United.

Southampton continued to progress under McMenemy's stewardship, and with a team containing Peter Shilton (the England goalkeeper), Nick Holmes, David Armstrong, striker Steve Moran and quick winger Danny Wallace achieved their highest league finish in 1983–84, finishing runners-up in the First Division, three points behind champions Liverpool. The club also reached the semi-finals of the FA Cup, where they were defeated 1–0 by Everton at Highbury. McMenemy then added experienced midfielder Jimmy Case to his ranks.

They finished fifth the following year, but as a result of the Heysel Disaster all English clubs were banned from European competition: had it not been for this, then Southampton would have again qualified for the UEFA Cup.

McMenemy left at the end of the 1984–85 season to be succeeded by Chris Nicholl, who was sacked after six years in charge despite preserving the club's top flight status. He was replaced by Ian Branfoot, who until the end of the 1990–91 season had been assistant manager to Steve Coppell at Crystal Palace. By this stage, a key player in the Southampton line-up was Guernsey-born attacking midfielder/striker Matthew Le Tissier, who broke into the first team in the 1986–87 season. He was voted PFA Young Player of the Year in 1990 and later made eight appearances for the England team – he finally retired in 2002 at the age of 33. Another exciting young player to break into the Southampton team just after Le Tissier was Alan Shearer, who at the age of 17 scored a hat-trick against Arsenal in a league match in April 1988. Shearer was a first team regular by 1990, and stayed with Southampton until July 1992, when he was sold to Blackburn Rovers for a national record of more than £3 million. He then became the most expensive footballer in the world when Blackburn sold him to Newcastle for £15 million in 1996. He also scored 30 times for England internationally.

=== Southampton in the Premier League (1992–2005) ===
Southampton were founding members of the Premier League in 1992–93, but spent most of the next ten seasons struggling against relegation. In 1995–96, Southampton finished 17th with 38 league points, avoiding relegation on goal difference. Two important wins during the final weeks of the season did much to ensure that Saints and not Manchester City would achieve Premiership survival. First came a 3–1 home win over eventual double winners Manchester United, then came a 1–0 away win over relegated Bolton Wanderers. Former Liverpool and Rangers manager Graeme Souness, was brought in, signing foreign players such as Egil Østenstad and Eyal Berkovic. The highlight of the season was a 6–3 win over Manchester United at The Dell in October, when both his signings scored twice. Souness resigned after just one season in charge, being replaced by Dave Jones who had won promotion to Division One with Stockport County as well as reaching the League Cup semi-finals.

In 1998–99, they were rooted to the bottom of the table for much of the first half of the season but again avoided relegation on the last day of the season after a late run of good results, helped by the intervention of Latvian Marian Pahars and old hero Le Tissier (The so-called "Great Escape"). In 1999, Southampton were given the go-ahead to build a new 32,000-seat stadium in the St Mary's area of the city, having been playing in the Dell since 1898. The stadium had been converted to an all-seater format earlier in the decade, but had a capacity of less than 16,000 and was unsuitable for further expansion.

During the 1999–2000 season, Dave Jones quit as Southampton manager to concentrate on a court case after he was accused of abusing children at the children's home where he had worked during the 1980s. The accusations were later proved to be groundless, but it was too late to save Jones' career as Southampton manager and he was succeeded by ex-England manager Glenn Hoddle. Hoddle helped keep Southampton well clear of the Premier League drop zone but having received an offer he moved to Tottenham Hotspur just before the end of the 2000–01 season. He was replaced by first-team coach Stuart Gray, who oversaw the relocation to the St Mary's Stadium for the 2001–02 season. At the end of the 2000–01 season, in the last competitive match at The Dell, Matthew Le Tissier came on late to score the last ever league goal at the old stadium with a half volley on the turn in a 3–2 win against Arsenal. Gray was sacked after a poor start to the following season, and he was replaced by ex-Coventry City manager Gordon Strachan, who steered Southampton to safety and a secure 11th-place finish.

In 2002–03, Southampton finished eighth in the league and finished runners-up in the FA Cup to Arsenal (after losing 1–0 at the Millennium Stadium), thanks in no small part to the metamorphosis of James Beattie, who fired home 24 goals, 23 in the league. Strachan resigned in March 2004 and within eight months, two managers – Paul Sturrock and Steve Wigley – had come and gone. Chairman Rupert Lowe risked the ire of Saints fans when he appointed Harry Redknapp as manager on 8 December 2004, just after his resignation at South Coast rivals Portsmouth. He brought in a number of new signings, including his son Jamie in the attempt to survive relegation. Southampton were relegated from the Premier League on the last day of the season, ending 27 successive seasons of top flight football for the club. Their relegation was confirmed by a 2–1 home defeat to Manchester United.

Lowe and Southampton continued to make headlines after former England Rugby World Cup-winning coach Sir Clive Woodward joined the club—eventually being appointed technical director in June 2005.

=== Outside the top flight (2005–2012) ===
In November 2005, manager Harry Redknapp resigned to rejoin Portsmouth, and was replaced by George Burley. Rupert Lowe resigned as chairman in June 2006, and Jersey-based businessman Michael Wilde, who had become the club's major shareholder assumed the post. Following a club record £6 million being spent on transfers, Polish strikers Grzegorz Rasiak and Marek Saganowski performed well and the season saw the introduction of 17-year-old left-back Gareth Bale. Southampton finished in sixth place and lost the play-off semi-final to Derby County on penalties.

The board sought new investment in the club, and in February 2007, Wilde stepped down as chairman to be replaced by local businessman Leon Crouch as "Acting chairman", a role Crouch retained until 21 July 2007. In the 2007–08 season, George Burley said that players such as Bale and Kenwyne Jones had to be sold to stop the club going into administration and that failing to achieve promotion had put the club in serious financial difficulty. Burley left the club in January 2008 to take over as Scotland manager and was replaced by Nigel Pearson who saved the club from relegation on the final day.

In July 2008, all the board members except one resigned, allowing Lowe and Wilde to return: Wilde as chairman of Southampton FC and Rupert Lowe as chairman of Southampton Leisure Holdings plc. Although Pearson kept the team up, the board did not renew his contract due to financial constraints, and the relatively unknown Dutchman Jan Poortvliet was appointed manager. Financial troubles continued to mount, resulting in more players being sold or loaned out and parts of St Mary's were closed off to reduce costs. In January 2009, Poortvliet resigned with the club one place from bottom of the Championship, with Mark Wotte taking over managerial duties.

In April 2009, Southampton's parent company was placed in administration. A 10-point penalty was imposed, but as the team was already being relegated due to finishing second from bottom of the Football League Championship this points deduction had to apply to the 2009–10 season. By the end of May, the club was unable to meet its staff wages and asked employees to work unpaid as a gesture of goodwill. The administrator warned that the club faced imminent bankruptcy unless a buyer was found. In June, administrator Mark Fry confirmed negotiations with two groups of investors, followed by confirmation that the club had been sold to an overseas buyer "owned and controlled by Markus Liebherr". Italian businessman Nicola Cortese was brought in by Liebherr to look after the club's business interests on his behalf. In July 2009, with the club in the control of the new owner, Wotte was sacked as head coach and Alan Pardew was appointed as the new first team manager. The Saints made their first big signing under Liebherr, striker Rickie Lambert, who was purchased on 10 August from League One side Bristol Rovers.

Southampton started the 2009–10 season in League One, in the third tier of English football for the first time in 50 years and with −10 points. In March 2010, Southampton won their first trophy since 1976 when they defeated Carlisle United 4–1 at Wembley to claim the Football League Trophy. Southampton finished the season in seventh place, seven points from the last play-off position.

A new home shirt was unveiled on 10 June 2010, in celebration of the club's 125th anniversary. The design was based on the original St. Mary's Y.M.A. kit used in 1885; it featured the new anniversary crest and was without a sponsor's logo. On 11 August, it was announced that Liebherr had died; however, the club's future had been assured and planned for before his death. Pardew was dismissed in August and Nigel Adkins joined from Scunthorpe United as his replacement. The club was promoted to the Championship in May 2011 as runners-up to Brighton & Hove Albion.

Returning to the Championship for the 2011–12 season, Southampton made their best start to a season for 75 years with a winning run at St. Mary's of 13 league games, setting a new club record and going top of the league. In April 2012, Southampton achieved promotion to the Premier League as runners-up to Reading. The final game of the season set a record attendance at St Mary's Stadium of 32,363. Lambert finished the season as the Championship's top goalscorer with 27 league goals, his third "Golden Boot" in four seasons. He also won the Championship Player of the Year award. As a result, they became the second team within a year to achieve back-to-back promotions, a feat that Norwich City had achieved one year before.

=== Return to the Premier League and relegation (2012–2023) ===
Southampton returned to the Premier League for season 2012–13 initially under Nigel Adkins. Substantial sums were spent to strengthen the playing squad, but early in the season, Adkins was replaced by Argentine coach Mauricio Pochettino. Southampton finished the season in 14th place, and next season in eighth.

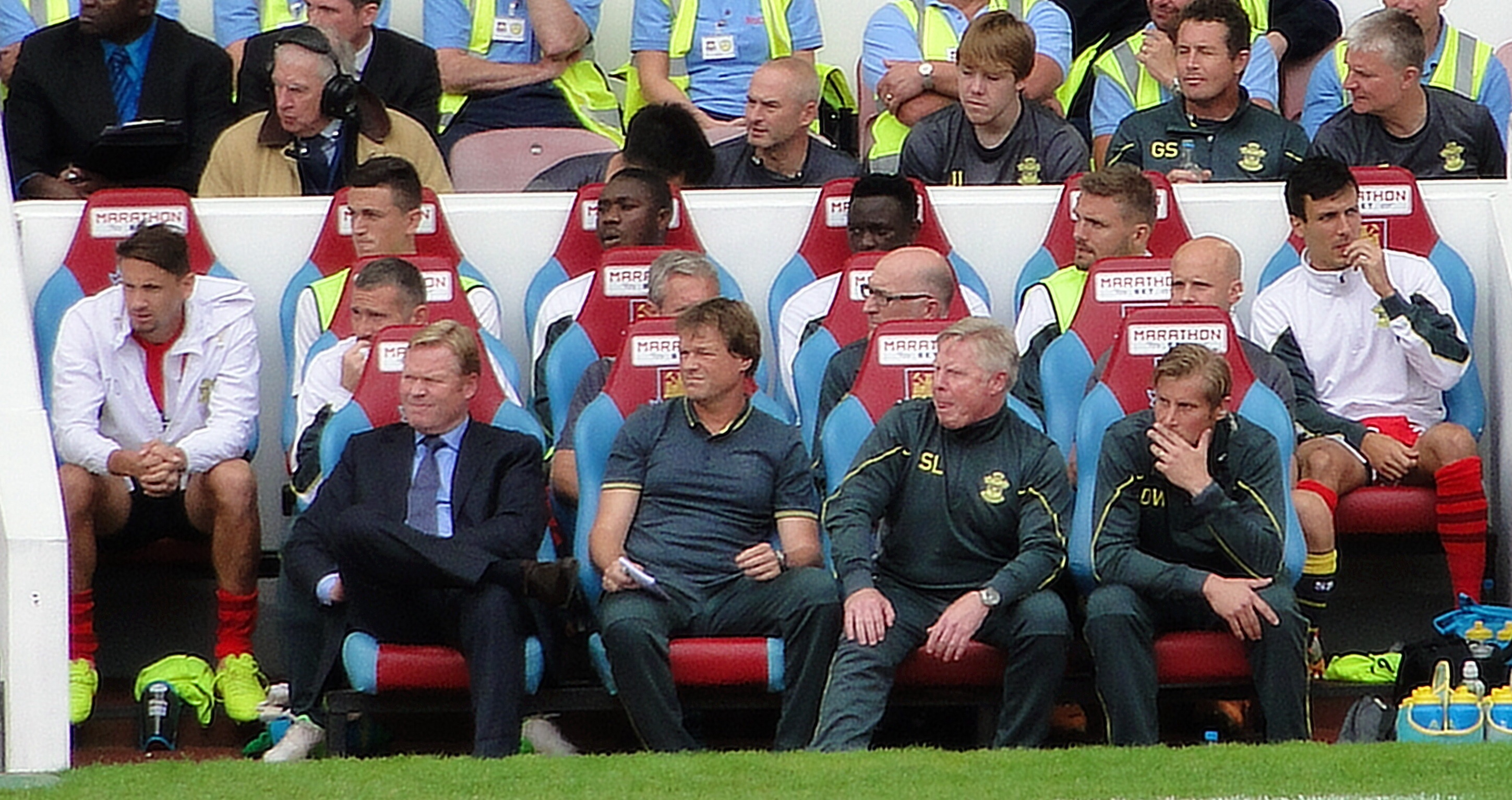
Ronald Koeman (front left) as manager

At the end of the 2013–14 season, Pochettino departed the club for Tottenham. The club subsequently appointed Ronald Koeman as his replacement on a three-year contract, and made several high-profile sales over the summer. In the final game of the 2014–15 season, a 6–1 victory against Aston Villa, Sadio Mané scored three goals in the space of 176 seconds, the fastest hat-trick in the history of the Premier League. The club finished seventh, then their highest ever Premier League rank, therefore qualifying for the 2015–16 UEFA Europa League. After defeating Vitesse, the Saints were eliminated in the play-off by Midtjylland. The following season, Southampton once again set new records for the club at the end of the season, finishing in sixth place. They once again qualified for the Europa League, although this time immediately entered the group stages, as opposed to the play-off rounds.

In June 2016, Koeman left Southampton to join Everton and Claude Puel replaced him on a three-year contract. The club were eliminated in the group stage of the Europa League by away goals to Hapoel Be'er Sheva F.C., despite having a superior goal difference. However, they were more successful in the EFL Cup, where they lost 3–2 in the final to Manchester United, where Manolo Gabbiadini was denied a hat-trick, courtesy of an incorrect offside decision. The club ended the 2016–17 season in eighth. During the summer, Puel was replaced as manager by Argentine coach Mauricio Pellegrino, previously of Alavés.

Southampton became involved in the United Kingdom football sexual abuse scandal in December 2016 when several former Southampton teenage trainees told the BBC about inappropriate incidents in the 1980s involving a former football coach who was later revealed to be Bob Higgins. Higgins was dismissed by Southampton in 1989 after the allegations were made against him, and in 1991 he was charged with six counts of indecent assault against young boys he had been coaching; at the trial at Southampton Crown Court he was acquitted on the direction of the judge when the prosecution offered no evidence. Higgins then worked as a youth coach at Peterborough United in the mid-1990s, and was investigated as part of a 1997 Channel 4 Dispatches investigation. After two further court cases, Higgins was found guilty in 2019 of indecent assault, at Bournemouth Crown Court, and sentenced to 24 years in prison.

In mid-season, the club sold Dutch defender Virgil van Dijk to Liverpool for an estimated £75 million, Southampton's record sale and a world record for his position. Pellegrino was sacked in March 2018 with the team one point above the relegation zone, and his replacement, former player, Mark Hughes, guided the club to a 17th-place finish, avoiding relegation on the last day of the season. Hughes signed a new contract at the end of the season but a poor start to the following season led to him being sacked in December with the team in 18th place. He was replaced with former RB Leipzig boss Ralph Hasenhüttl, who steered the club away from relegation to finish 16th.

In August 2017, Southampton Football Club confirmed that the Chinese businessman Gao Jisheng had completed a multimillion-pound takeover of the club, acquiring an 80% stake for around £210m after successfully passing the relevant checks, including the Premier League's owners and directors test. The deal followed more than 12 months of talks between the Gao family and the south coast club. The investment was made personally by Gao and his daughter Nelly as opposed to being sanctioned through Lander Sports, as originally mooted. Hangzhou-based Lander is the family's business arm, which develops, constructs and manages sports sites.

Southampton suffered their worst ever defeat on 25 October 2019, losing 9–0 to Leicester City at home, this would later be replicated on 2 February 2021 against Manchester United at Old Trafford in the following campaign, albeit under different circumstances. It is tied with Ipswich Town's defeat by Manchester United in 1995 as the biggest defeat since the Premier League's inception. Following universal backlash toward the team's performance, the players and coaching staff refused their wages from the match and instead donated them to the Saints Foundation. On 9 April 2020, Southampton became the first Premier League club to defer players' salaries, during the COVID-19 pandemic. Despite a poor start that saw them in the relegation zone as late as November, Southampton improved greatly as the season went on, ending the year with a seven-game unbeaten streak to finish 11th in the league. Their final tally of 52 points was the team's highest total since 2015–16.

The club's good run continued in the 2020–21 season with the Saints sitting in third after 13 games. The team also had a successful run in the FA Cup where they reached the semi-finals, losing to eventual winners Leicester City. In November, Southampton briefly led the Premier League table. However, despite the outstanding start to the season, a mid-season loss of form and an accumulation of injuries which decimated the senior squad ranks, due in part to the unavailability of much of the club's training facilities resulting from the restrictions imposed during the second lockdown in England. As a consequence of this, Hasenhüttl was forced to field many of the club's youth players in an attempt to fill in the gaps in his senior squad. After an impressive run during the first half of the season, Southampton would eventually finish in 15th place. In January 2022, Gao sold his 80% stake to Sport Republic, a group financed by Serbian Dragan Šolak for £100m. Despite most pundits predicting them to be relegated at the start of the season, Southampton finished the 2021–22 season in 15th place for the second consecutive year.

In November 2022, it was announced Southampton had parted company with manager Ralph Hasenhüttl after four years, to be replaced by Nathan Jones. On 12 February 2023, Jones was sacked following a disappointing run of results during which the Saints lost seven out of eight league matches, leaving them bottom of the Premier League table. After having served as caretaker manager in a 1–0 victory over Chelsea, Rubén Sellés, who had joined Southampton as first-team lead coach in June 2022, was announced as Jones's replacement on 24 February on a contract until the end of the 2022–23 season. Sellés was unable to save the Saints' season, and the team were effectively relegated on 13 May, following a 2–0 home loss to Fulham. On 24 May 2023, Southampton confirmed that they would not renew the contract of Sellés when it expired at the end of the season.

=== Subsequent promotion and relegation (2023–present) ===
On 21 June 2023, the club appointed Russell Martin as manager on a three-year contract. After losing four of their first eight games back in the Championship, the Saints went on a club-record 25-game unbeaten run in all competitions. Following an eventual fourth place finish, Southampton returned to the Premier League at the first attempt via the play-offs, defeating Leeds United 1–0 in the final at Wembley.

On 15 December 2024, Martin was dismissed after a 5–0 defeat at home to Tottenham Hotspur, as Southampton sat 20th in the Premier League table with only five points after 16 games. Six days later, Ivan Jurić was appointed as manager on an 18-month deal. The club were relegated from the Premier League on 6 April 2025 with seven games remaining, becoming the earliest team to suffer relegation in Premier League history. Jurić left Southampton by mutual consent the following day, with under-21s manager Simon Rusk appointed as his replacement on an interim basis for the remainder of the season.

In May 2025, Will Still was announced as the incoming manager for the upcoming season on a three-year contract. Still was dismissed on 2 November 2025, with Southampton 21st in the Championship and having won just twice in their first 13 league games. Having been appointed as interim head coach of the club since Still's sacking, under-21s manager Tonda Eckert was announced as Southampton's full time head coach on 5 December 2025, signing a contract until 2027.

Southampton ended the 2025–26 season in fourth place, and beat Middlesbrough 2–1 on aggregate in the play-off semi-final. The tie was surrounded by controversy, after a Southampton analyst was spotted filming a Middlesbrough training session two days before the first leg, in contravention of league regulations. On 19 May 2026, following a hearing with the EFL Independent Disciplinary Commission, the club was expelled from the 2026 EFL Championship play-off final, with Middlesbrough taking their place in the final against Hull City. The expulsion was estimated to cost the club up to £200 million in lost Premier League promotion revenue and related commercial income. In the hearings into the espionage controversy, the club also admitted to spying on Ipswich Town and Oxford United training sessions. The club was also penalised with a four-point deduction for the 2026–27 EFL Championship. The Saints appealed the ruling, but it was dismissed by an independent panel with no other opportunity to appeal. In July 2026, in relation to the spying incidents, the FA charged Eckert with three breaches of FA rules.

== Club identity ==
=== Crest ===
The 125th Anniversary year crest

Originally, the club used the same crest as the one used by the city itself. However, in 1974 a competition was run for fans to design a new one.

The winning design, designed by Rolland Parris, was used for around 20 years, before being modified slightly in the 1990s.

From top-to-bottom, the halo is a reference to the nickname "Saints", the ball to the nature of the club, the scarf to the fans and the team colours. The tree represents the nearby New Forest and Southampton Common, with the water representing Southampton's connections with the rivers, seas and oceans. Below that is a white rose – the symbol of the city which is also present on the city coat of arms. In the mid-1990s the ball was changed from a vintage style ball (such as those used in the 1960s) to the current ball with black and white panels, for copyright reasons.

On 13 May 2010, the official crest for the 125th anniversary was released: "The black outline and halo feature will now appear in gold, whilst the all important years 1885 and 2010 are scripted either side of the shield, with the figure 125 replacing the ball". The badge was used on Southampton's shirts for the 2010–11 season.

=== Anthem ===
The Saints' anthem is the popular sports tune "When the Saints Go Marching In", and since the club's official nickname is "the Saints", they are one of only a few teams who do not change the original lyric.

=== Kit manufacturers and sponsors ===
Since 2024, Southampton's kits have been manufactured by Puma. Previous manufacturers have included Umbro (1974–76, 2008–13), Admiral (1976–80, 1991–93), Patrick (1980–87), Hummel (1987–91, 2021–24), Pony (1993–99), Adidas (2013–14, 2015–16) and Under Armour (2016–21). From 1999 to 2008, and in 2014–15, the club used its own brand, Saints.

Various companies have sponsored the players' shirts since shirt advertising was permitted in English football. The first company to do so was photocopier manufacturer Rank Xerox which sponsored the club for three years from 1980. Other sponsors have been Air Florida (1983), Draper Tools (1984–93), Dimplex (1993–95), Sanderson (1995–99), Friends Provident (1999–2006), Flybe (2006–10), aap3 (2011–14), Veho (2014–16), Virgin Media (2016–19), LD Sports (2019–20), Sportsbet.io (2020–24) and Rollbit (2024–25). Since 2025, the main shirt sponsor is P&O Cruises. Since 2025, the sleeve sponsor is Garmin. Previous sleeve sponsors have been Virgin Media (2017–2022), JD Sports (2022–23), Mairon Freight UK (2023–24) and P&O Cruises (2024–25).

| Period | Kit manufacturer | Shirt sponsor (front) | Shirt sponsor (sleeve) | Shirt sponsor (back) |
|---|---|---|---|---|
| 1974–1976 | Umbro | No sponsor | No sponsor | No sponsor |
| 1976–1980 | Admiral | No sponsor | No sponsor | No sponsor |
| 1980–1983 | Patrick | Rank Xerox | No sponsor | No sponsor |
| 1983 | Patrick | Air Florida | No sponsor | No sponsor |
| 1984–1987 | Patrick | Draper Tools | No sponsor | No sponsor |
| 1987–1991 | Hummel | Draper Tools | No sponsor | No sponsor |
| 1991–1993 | Admiral | Draper Tools | No sponsor | No sponsor |
| 1993–1995 | Pony | Dimplex | No sponsor | No sponsor |
| 1995–1999 | Pony | Sanderson | No sponsor | No sponsor |
| 1999–2006 | Saints | Friends Provident | No sponsor | No sponsor |
| 2006–2008 | Saints | Flybe | No sponsor | No sponsor |
| 2008–2010 | Umbro | Flybe | No sponsor | No sponsor |
| 2010–2011 | Umbro | No sponsor | No sponsor | No sponsor |
| 2011–2013 | Umbro | aap3 | No sponsor | No sponsor |
| 2013–2014 | Adidas | Veho | No sponsor | No sponsor |
| 2014–2015 | Saints | Veho | No sponsor | No sponsor |
| 2015–2016 | Adidas | Veho | No sponsor | No sponsor |
| 2016–2017 | Under Armour | Virgin Media | No sponsor | No sponsor |
| 2017–2019 | Under Armour | Virgin Media | Virgin Media | No sponsor |
| 2019–2020 | Under Armour | LD Sports | Virgin Media | No sponsor |
| 2020–2021 | Under Armour | Sportsbet.io | Virgin Media | No sponsor |
| 2021–2022 | Hummel | Sportsbet.io | Virgin Media | No sponsor |
| 2022–2023 | Hummel | Sportsbet.io | JD Sports | No sponsor |
| 2023–2024 | Hummel | Sportsbet.io | Mairon Freight UK | Draper Tools |
| 2024–2025 | Puma | Rollbit | P&O Cruises | Rollbit (in FA Cup matches) / Garmin (in EFL Cup matches) |
| 2025– | Puma | P&O Cruises | Garmin | |

== Stadium and training facilities ==
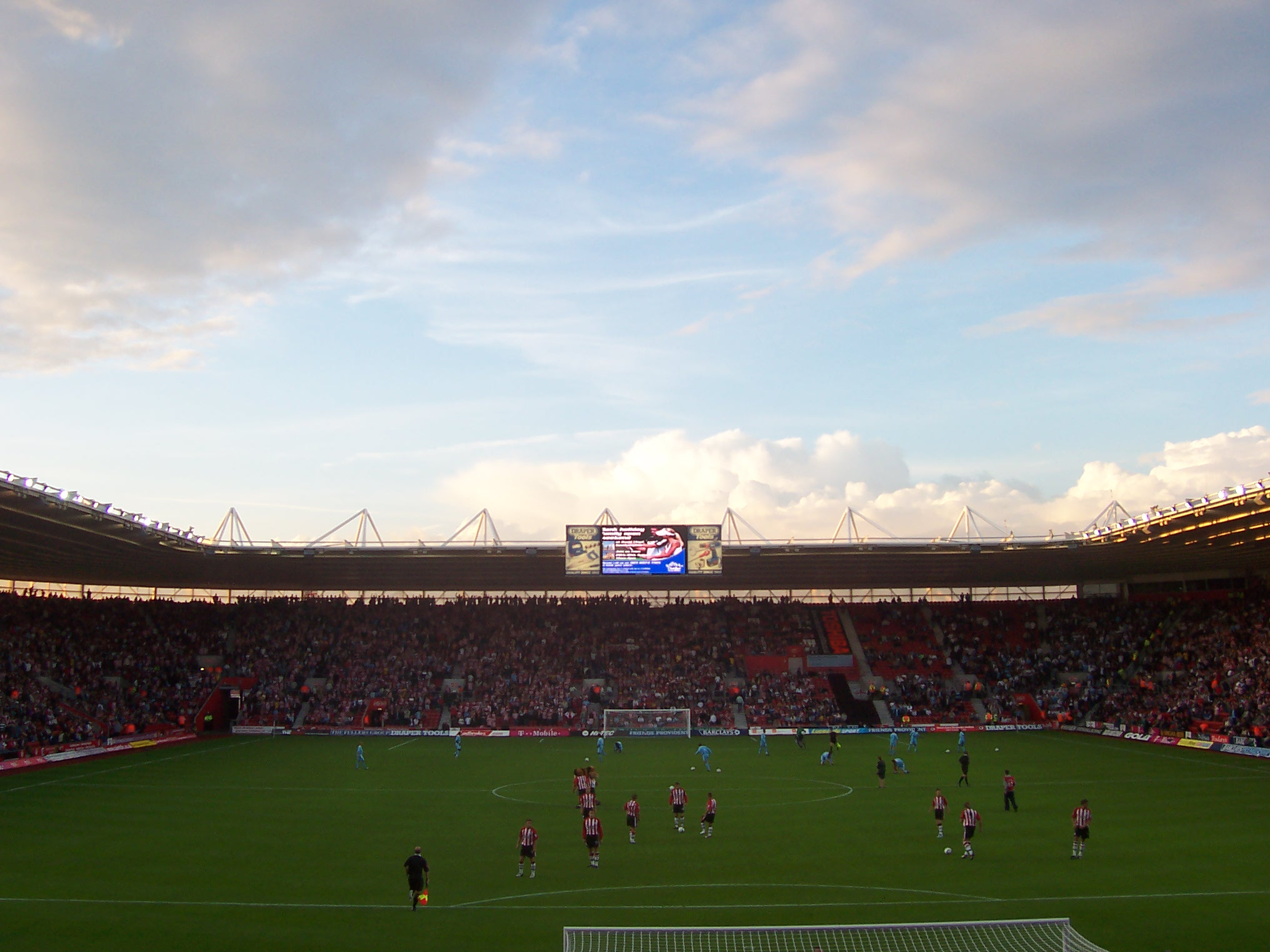
View from the Chapel Stand

The club's first home ground was the Antelope Ground from 1887 to 1896. Followed by the County Cricket Ground from 1896 to 1898.

From 1898 to 2001, Southampton played their home games at The Dell. The purpose-built stadium was redeveloped a number of times through its 103-year history, with two of the stands being completely rebuilt after fires and in 1950 it became the first ground in England to have permanent floodlighting installed. Following the Taylor report, The Dell was converted to an all-seater stadium and, with a capacity of approximately 15,000, became the smallest ground in England's top-flight, precipitating a move to a new home.

St Mary's Stadium has been home to the Saints since August 2001. It has a capacity of 32,689 and is one of only a handful of stadia in Europe to meet UEFA's Four Star criteria. The stadium has also been host to a number of international games. The ground's record attendance is 32,363, set in a game between Southampton and Coventry City in April 2012.

The club's training facilities, Staplewood Campus, are located in Marchwood on the edge of the New Forest. The current facilities were opened in November 2014, at a cost of circa £40m. The main building was named after the club's late owner, Markus Liebherr.

For the 2012–13 season, until the end of the 2013–14 season, the club agreed a deal with Eastleigh, then of the Conference South, for the use of their stadium, Ten Acres, for The Saints' U21 team fixtures. This continued a partnership with Eastleigh that had lasted for nearly a decade. This partnership, though, ended and Southampton's youth teams continued to play at Staplewood and St. Mary's until the 2019–20 season when some U23 cup games were to be played at Totton's Testwood Stadium, where Southampton Women had played their league home matches.

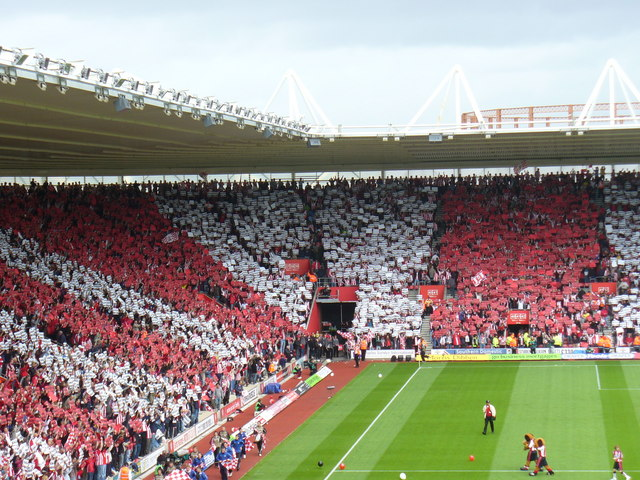
Fans create a tifo in the St Mary's Stadium

== Rivalries ==
The South Coast Derby is the name given to matches between the Saints and their fierce nearby rivals, Portsmouth, from the city of the same name, 19 miles (31 km) from Southampton. The south coast derbies are also referred to as the Hampshire derby. Including Southern League games, there have been 71 games between the two clubs, with Southampton winning 35 and Portsmouth 21.

== Records and statistics ==
Longest winning run

- 10 matches, 16 April 2011 – 20 August 2011 (League)
- 11 matches, 16 April 2011 – 20 August 2011 (All competitions)

Longest unbeaten run

- 22 matches, 30 September 2023 – 10 February 2024 (League)
- 25 matches, 30 September 2023 – 10 February 2024 (All competitions)

Longest home winning streak

- 19 matches, 12 February 2011 – 29 November 2011 (League)
- 21 matches, 12 February 2011 – 29 November 2011 (All competitions)

Biggest wins

- Home
  - 11–0 against Northampton Town, 28 December 1901 (Southern League)
  - 11–0 against Watford, 13 December 1902 (Southern League)
  - 8–0 against Northampton Town, 24 December 1921 (Football League Third Division South)
  - 8–0 against Sunderland, 18 October 2014 (Premier League)
- Away
  - 8–0 against Newport County, 25 August 2021 (EFL Cup)
  - 6–0 against Carlisle United, 22 January 1977 (Football League Second Division)
  - 6–0 against Wolverhampton Wanderers, 31 March 2007 (Football League Championship)
  - 6–0 against Oldham Athletic, 11 January 2011 (Football League One)

Biggest losses

- Home
  - 0–9 against Leicester City, 25 October 2019 (Premier League)
  - 0–6 against Plymouth Argyle, 5 December 1931 (Football League Second Division)
  - 0–6 against Brentford, 9 March 1959 (Football League Third Division)
- Away
  - 0–9 against Manchester United, 2 February 2021 (Premier League)
  - 0–8 against Crystal Palace, 16 November 1913 (Southern League)
  - 0–8 against Tottenham Hotspur, 28 March 1936 (Football League Second Division)
  - 0–8 against Everton, 20 November 1971 (Football League First Division)

Highest scoring Football League game

- 9–3 (at home) against Wolverhampton Wanderers, 18 September 1965 (Football League Second Division)

Record home attendance 32,363 against Coventry City, 28 April 2012

=== Player records ===
Most appearances Terry Paine – 815: 1956–1974

Most goals Mick Channon – 228: 1966–1977, 1979–1982

Most goals in one season Derek Reeves – 44: 1959–60

Most goals in one match Albert Brown – 7: against Northampton Town, 28 December 1901

Youngest player Theo Walcott – 16 years 143 days. Against Wolverhampton Wanderers, 6 August 2005

Oldest player Willy Caballero – 41 years 122 days. Against Blackpool, 28 January 2023

Highest transfer fees

- Spent: Kamaldeen Sulemana – £22 million fee paid to Rennes.
- Received: Virgil van Dijk – £75 million fee received from Liverpool.

== Players ==
=== Current squad ===
As of 4 September 2026

Note: Flags indicate national team as defined under FIFA eligibility rules; some limited exceptions apply. Players may hold more than one non-FIFA nationality.

| No. | Pos. | Nation | Player |
|---|---|---|---|
| 1 | GK | ISR | Daniel Peretz |
| 2 | DF | DEN | Mads Roerslev |
| 3 | DF | IRL | Ryan Manning |
| 4 | MF | ENG | Flynn Downes |
| 5 | DF | ENG | Jack Stephens (captain) |
| 6 | DF | ENG | Zach Abbott (on loan from Nottingham Forest) |
| 7 | MF | BRA | Léo Scienza |
| 8 | MF | GER | Caspar Jander |
| 9 | FW | CAN | Cyle Larin |
| 10 | MF | IRL | Finn Azaz |
| 11 | FW | ENG | Lewis Dobbin |
| 13 | DF | GER | Keven Schlotterbeck |
| 14 | DF | ENG | James Bree |

| No. | Pos. | Nation | Player |
|---|---|---|---|
| 15 | DF | ENG | Nathan Wood |
| 18 | MF | ENG | Tom Fellows |
| 23 | MF | ENG | Samuel Edozie |
| 25 | GK | ENG | George Long |
| 26 | MF | SCO | Cam Bragg |
| 27 | MF | JPN | Kuryu Matsuki |
| 28 | FW | ENG | Divin Mubama (on loan from Manchester City) |
| 29 | MF | IRL | Romeo Akachukwu |
| 30 | MF | ENG | James Ward-Prowse |
| 31 | GK | ENG | Jamie Jones |
| 32 | GK | ENG | Aaron Ramsdale |
| 34 | DF | BRA | Welington |

=== Out on loan ===
Note: Flags indicate national team as defined under FIFA eligibility rules; some limited exceptions apply. Players may hold more than one non-FIFA nationality.

| No. | Pos. | Nation | Player |
|---|---|---|---|
| 16 | DF | JPN | Yukinari Sugawara (on loan at Cagliari until end of season) |
| 17 | DF | GER | Joshua Quarshie (on loan at Sturm Graz until end of season) |
| 19 | FW | ENG | Cameron Archer (on loan at Auxerre until end of season) |
| 22 | FW | CHI | Ben Brereton Díaz (on loan at Sheffield United until end of season) |
| 42 | FW | USA | Damion Downs (on loan at St. Louis City until December 2027) |
| 47 | MF | ENG | Moses Sesay (on loan at Colchester United until end of season) |
| 49 | FW | ENG | Nicholas Oyekunle (on loan at Leyton Orient until end of season) |

| No. | Pos. | Nation | Player |
|---|---|---|---|
| — | GK | ENG | Dylan Moody (on loan at AFC Totton until 6 November 2026) |
| — | GK | ENG | Ollie Wright (on loan at Gillingham until end of season) |
| — | DF | ENG | Tommy Dobson-Ventura (on loan at Eastleigh until end of season) |
| — | DF | ENG | Jayden Moore (on loan at Worthing until end of season) |
| — | MF | ENG | Jay Robinson (on loan at Monza until end of season) |
| — | MF | MLI | Issa Tounkara (on loan at Valenciennes until end of season) |
| — | MF | FRA | Daouda Traoré (on loan at Le Mans until end of season) |

=== The Saints U21s and Academy ===
Southampton runs a highly successful youth academy, with a number of teams from ages eight to 21 years. Recent products of the club's youth system include England internationals Adam Lallana, Alex Oxlade-Chamberlain, James Ward-Prowse, Calum Chambers, Luke Shaw and Theo Walcott; Wales international winger Gareth Bale; and Ireland international striker Michael Obafemi.

== Club management ==
Corporate Hierarchy

| Position | Name |
|---|---|
| Owner | Sport Republic (80%); Katharina Liebherr (20%) |
| Chairman | Dragan Šolak |
| CEO | Phil Parsons |
| Lead investor (Sport Republic) | Dragan Šolak |
| Chairman (Sport Republic) | Dragan Šolak |
| CEO (Sport Republic) | Rasmus Ankersen |
| CFO | Michael Fenn |
| COO | Tim Greenwell |
| Chief revenue officer | Greg Baker |
| Group technical director | Johannes Spors |
| Director | Henrik Kraft |
| Director | Andy Young |
| Director | Rolf Bögli |
| Director of HR | Michelle Butler |
| Head of women's football | Marieanne Spacey-Cale |
| Head of football operations | Mark Bitcon |
| Honorary president | Terry Paine MBE |
| Club ambassador | Francis Benali |
| Club ambassador | Lawrie McMenemy |

Coaching Staff

| Position | Name |
|---|---|
| Head coach | Tonda Eckert |
| Assistant head coach | Ben Garner |
| First team coach | Jeremy Newton |
| First team coach | Ben Reeves |
| Goalkeeping coach | Ryan Flood |
| First team analyst | Albert Jones |
| First team analyst | Eduard Schmidt |
| Head of professional medical services | Steve Wright |
| Head of sports science | Tom Barnden |
| Sports scientist | Bill Styles |
| Strength & conditioning coach | Mathew Banks |
| Club doctor | Dr. Inigo Sarriegui |
| Lead performance physio | Neil Simms |
| First-team physio | Luke Thomas |
| Kit & equipment manager | Mark Forbes |

Academy Staff

| Position | Name |
|---|---|
| Academy director | Andy Goldie |
| Academy manager | Duncan Fearnhead |
| Head of academy coaching | Ricky King |
| Head of academy recruitment | Chris Robinson |
| Head of academy performance | Tom Sturdy |
| Head of player strategy | Olly Lancashire |
| Head of group talent development | Nick Davies |
| Player transition coach | Dean Wilkins |
| Under-21 coach | Adam Lallana |
| Under-21 assistant coach | Matthew Etherington |
| Under-21 goalkeeping coach | James Granger |
| Under-21 analyst | Ollie Dennett |
| Under-21 physical performance coach | Jack Baldwin |
| Under-18 coach | Andrew Surman |
| Under-18 assistant coach | Callum Martin |

Sports Science

| Position | Name |
|---|---|
| Sports therapist | Chris Lovegrove |
| Sports therapist | Jack Curson |
| Professional-phase soft-tissue therapist | Giovanni Fenu |
| Performance psychologist | Malcolm Frame |

Scouting, recruitment & analytics

| Position | Name |
|---|---|
| Head of recruitment | Tim Lederer |
| Head of scouting operations | Sam Stanton |
| Set piece analyst | Lewis Mahoney |
| Head of data & research | Joe Ferrelly |
| Player insights recruitment analyst | Jonathan Kaye |

== Honours ==
The following tables list Southampton's league, cup and regional honours.

=== Titles ===
| Type | Competition | Titles | Seasons |
|---|---|---|---|
| Domestic | FA Cup | 1 | 1975–76 |
| Domestic | Third Division South / Third Division | 2 | 1921–22, 1959–60 |
| Domestic | Football League Trophy | 1 | 2009–10 |
| Domestic | Southern League | 6 | 1896–97, 1897–98, 1898–99, 1900–01, 1902–03, 1903–04 |
| Regional | Hampshire Senior Cup | 17 | 1891, 1892, 1895, 1899, 1901, 1902, 1905, 1907, 1908, 1910, 1914, 1920, 1921, 1935, 1940, 1950, 1976 |

- Competition record.

=== Other honours ===
| Competition | Achievement | Season(s) |
|---|---|---|
| First Division (level 1) | Runners-up | 1983–84 |
| Second Division / Championship (level 2) | Runners-up (3) | 1965–66, 1977–78, 2011–12 |
| EFL Championship play-offs | Winners | 2024 |
| League One (level 3) | Runners-up | 2010–11 |
| FA Cup | Runners-up (3) | 1899–1900, 1901–02, 2002–03 |
| FA Charity Shield | Runners-up | 1976 |
| Football League Cup / EFL Cup | Runners-up (2) | 1978–79, 2016–17 |
| Full Members' Cup | Runners-up | 1991–92 |
