= Rasmus Ankersen =

Danish author and sports executive (b. 1983)

- Born: Rasmus Ankersen; 22 September 1983 (age 42); Herning, Denmark
- Occupations: Author, sports executive
- Known for: Sport Republic

Rasmus Ankersen (born 22 September 1983) is a Danish author and football club executive.

He is the co-founder and CEO of Sport Republic, the major shareholder of EFL Championship club Southampton and Süper Lig club Göztepe. Ankersen was director of football at Brentford between 2015 and 2020. He also has a part-time role as chairman of Danish Superliga club Midtjylland.

== Early football career ==
Ankersen had a short career as a professional football player with Midtjylland in Denmark, before suffering a serious knee injury in his first senior game. He then studied for UEFA's A Licence, and became the assistant-coach for the under-17 team at a club.

Brentford owner Matthew Benham became the majority shareholder of Midtjylland in 2014 and installed Ankersen as chairman of the club. Ankersen stepped down from the role at the same time he left Brentford.

== Brentford ==
I am convinced that this is the start of a journey to something special at Brentford Football Club. It is an honour for me to be asked to play a role in Brentford's bright future.

— Rasmus Ankersen on joining Brentford.

Ankersen was appointed as co-director of football at Brentford in the summer of 2015, along with Phil Giles. Their responsibility was to oversee the football operations of the club as well as being responsible for managing the recruitment of new players and technical staff.

In December 2021, Ankersen stepped down from his position at Brentford to set up a sports investment fund.

== Sport Republic ==
Sport Republic was founded in December 2021 by Ankersen and Henrik Kraft. Ankersen was listed as CEO and Kraft was listed as chairman of the company. Sport Republic is backed by Serbian billionaire Dragan Šolak.

On 4 January 2022, Sport Republic bought English club Southampton. On 19 August 2022, Sport Republic acquired a 70% controlling stake in Turkish side Göztepe. Ankersen was appointed chairman of Göztepe.

Following Southampton’s relegation from the Premier League at the conclusion of the 2022–23 season, Sport Republic announced organisational changes at the club. Ankersen continued as CEO of Sport Republic, overseeing football strategy.

In September 2026, Ankersen resigned as a director at Southampton but remained a co-owner of the club.

== Published work ==
Ankersen has published several books, including; A Winner's DNA, Mid-level DNA, Education of a Winner, The Gold Mine Effect and Hunger in Paradise with Danish publisher Turbulenz.

In his books, he draws on experiences traveling around the world to live with, work with and inspect some of the world's best talent environments in sports. Due to the popularity of his books, he has been dubbed a 'high performance expert'.

The attention gained from his written work has led to public speeches, appearing in media outlets such as CNN and Sky.
