= Edward Abington =

Edward Abington may refer to:

- Edward Habington (died 1586), also spelt Edward Abington, English conspirator in the Babington Plot
- Edward Abington Jr. (born 1943), American diplomat

== See also ==
- Abington (disambiguation)
