= Abingdon (1922 automobile) =

British cyclecar manufactured in 1922

The Abingdon was an English assembled car built in small numbers in 1922 and 1923 in a factory in Tyseley, Birmingham. It used an 11-9hp 1490 cc 4-cylinder Dorman engine and a 3-speed gearbox. Only 12 were made. Production was hampered by financial difficulties for the Wrigley company, who supplied key components such as the steering gear and three-speed gearbox.

The company also produced Abingdon Motorcycles until 1925. In 1905 and 1906, it had produced the 5 hp (4 kW) AKD tricar.

== See also ==
- List of car manufacturers of the United Kingdom
