= Bill Abington =

American politician (1921–2014)

Member of the Texas House of Representatives
- In office 1949–1953

Personal details
- Born: William Henry Abington; September 6, 1921 Childress, Texas, U.S.
- Died: January 4, 2014 (aged 92) Austin, Texas, U.S.
- Party: Democratic
- Occupation: Politician

William Henry Abington (September 6, 1921 – January 4, 2014) was an American politician. He served in the Texas House of Representatives, representing Tarrant County, from 1949 to 1953. He was a Democrat. He was born in Childress, Texas, and died in Austin, Texas. Abington was also active in the oil industry, serving as president of the Texas Oil & Gas Association.
