= Sport Republic =

Sports investment company

- Type: Sports Investment Firm
- Industry: Sports; Sports services
- Founded: 8 December 2021; 4 years ago
- Founders: Rasmus Ankersen; Henrik Kraft
- Headquarters: London, England
- Key people: Dragan Šolak
- Subsidiaries: Southampton (80%); Göztepe (70%); Żabbar St. Patrick (65%); Valenciennes; FC Mali Coura; Tonsser; Sport Buff

Sport Republic is a British sports investment firm with ownership of multiple football clubs, founded by Rasmus Ankersen and Henrik Kraft and financed by Serbian businessman Dragan Šolak. As of October 2026, the firm holds controlling stakes in EFL Championship's Southampton, Süper Lig's Göztepe, Ligue 3's Valenciennes, and Maltese Premier League's Żabbar St. Patrick.

Sport Republic's 2022 acquisition of Turkish second tier club Göztepe made it the first foreign investor to buy a club in the Turkish football industry.

== Background ==
Sport Republic was set up by Rasmus Ankersen, who was previously director of football at Brentford, and Henrik Kraft, formerly a partner at private equity firm KKR, on 8 December 2021. Dragan Šolak was told about the plans to obtain stakes in football clubs, with Šolak agreeing and becoming a lead investor.

United Group, the Serbian media company founded by Šolak, had held the rights to screen Premier League matches in markets in Southeast Europe through their subsidiary Sport Klub, lost out on the rights to screen Premier League matches to Arena Sport, a similar network run by their rival company, the state-backed Telekom Srbija, in 2021. Šolak has later insisted that his decision to buy Southampton in 2022 was not related to losing the Premier League broadcasting rights.

On 1 February 2025, Kraft left his position as a director of Sport Republic UK Ltd, having stepped down as chairman of Southampton and Valenciennes earlier in the year. As of February 2025, Kraft is still listed as an active director of Sport Republic Holding Ltd.

== Sport Republic owned clubs ==
=== Southampton F.C. ===
On 4 January 2022, it was announced that Sport Republic had bought Chinese businessman Gao Jisheng’s 80% stake in Southampton. Despite buying Southampton, Sport Republic was keen to create a multi-club model similar to what City Football Group has achieved but to a smaller scale. Southampton chief executive Martin Semmens said that the new ownership would allow the club to be more flexible in the transfer market but insisted a sensible, cautious approach will help the club in the long term.

Sport Republic’s first summer transfer window during the 2022–23 season saw a number of new arrivals for Southampton, with the transfers putting faith in youth. The window saw the arrivals of Gavin Bazunu, Mateusz Lis, Armel Bella-Kotchap, Roméo Lavia, Joe Aribo, Sékou Mara, Duje Ćaleta-Car, Samuel Edozie and Juan Larios on permanent transfers, whilst Ainsley Maitland-Niles joined on loan. The manager at the time, Ralph Hasenhüttl, called their efforts in the window 'phenomenal'. On 7 November 2022, Southampton announced it had parted company with Hasenhüttl. At the time, Southampton were in the Premier League relegation zone with 12 points after 14 games. Three days later, Sport Republic appointed Nathan Jones as Southampton's new manager, joining from Luton Town. Jones's appointment led to widespread disapproval from the fanbase and calls to sack him after just four games, with Jones losing all four.

The January window saw Sport Republic buying five players in an attempt to lift the club off the bottom of the table. A club record fee of €25 million was paid for winger Kamaldeen Sulemana. Mislav Oršić, Carlos Alcaraz, James Bree, and striker Paul Onuachu also joined the club. On 12 February 2023, Nathan Jones was sacked as Southampton manager after just 95 days in charge. Rubén Sellés then took over for the remainder of the season, before leaving the club. On 13 May 2023, it was confirmed that Southampton would be relegated to the EFL Championship, after Sport Republic's first full season of ownership. Following relegation, Sport Republic made large organisational and senior staff changes at Southampton including long standing CEO, Martin Semmens leaving his role and the appointment of Šolak as chairman.

On 21 June 2023, Russell Martin was appointed as manager from Swansea City on a contract running until 2026. After only one season in the Championship, the club was promoted to the Premier League at the end of the 2023–24 season. Martin was sacked the following season after one victory in sixteen matches, leaving Southampton bottom of the league, and was replaced by Ivan Jurić. On 14 January 2025, Kraft stepped down as chairman of the club and was replaced by Šolak.

The club were effectively relegated from the Premier League for the second time under Sport Republic on 6 April 2025 with seven games remaining, becoming the earliest team to suffer relegation in Premier League history. Jurić left Southampton by mutual consent following relegation. On the final matchday of the season, Will Still was announced as incoming manager for the following season in the Championship on a three-year contract.

=== Göztepe S.K. ===
On 19 August 2022, it was announced that Sport Republic brought a 70% stake in Göztepe. Ankersen, who is director at Southampton, was appointed chairman of the club. The club were promoted to the Süper Lig at the end of the 2023–24 season. They then finished eighth in the 2024–25 season.

=== Valenciennes F.C. ===
On 25 July 2023, Sport Republic became the majority shareholder of French club Valenciennes. The club were relegated to the Championnat National at the end of the 2023–24 season.

=== Żabbar St. Patrick F.C. ===
In October 2026, Sport Republic acquired a majority stake in Maltese club Żabbar St. Patrick.

== Sport Republic partner clubs ==
=== FC Mali Coura ===
Sport Republic has a partnership with Malian team FC Mali Coura and its academy group ABM Football Academy, providing internships to players.

== Other business ventures ==
Sport Republic has also acquired stakes in the following companies:

- Tonsser – a football youth development app;
- Sport Buff – a sports streaming site;
- Sportlight – a sports technology company;
- Hexis – a sports nutrition app.
