= Abington =

Abington may refer to:

== People ==
- Abington (surname)

== Places ==
=== Australia ===
- Abington, Queensland

=== Ireland ===
- Abington, County Limerick, part of a civil parish in Ireland which straddles two counties, Limerick and Tipperary
  - Abington (townland), in the above civil parish in County Limerick
- Abington, County Tipperary, part of a civil parish in Ireland which straddles two counties, Limerick and Tipperary

=== United Kingdom ===
- Abington, Cambridgeshire, England
- Abington, Northamptonshire, England, a former village merged into Northampton
- Abington (ward), an electoral ward of Northampton, England
- Abington, South Lanarkshire, Scotland

=== United States ===
- Abington, Connecticut
- Abington, Indiana
- Abington, Massachusetts
- Abington Township, Mercer County, Illinois
- Abington Township, Wayne County, Indiana
- Waverly Township, Pennsylvania (formerly Abington Township)
- Abington Township, Montgomery County, Pennsylvania
  - Abington, Pennsylvania, unincorporated community within Abington Township

== Other uses ==
- Pinta Island, also known as Abington Island, in the Galápagos Islands group
- Abington (MBTA station)

== See also ==
- Abingdon (disambiguation)
