= Dragan Šolak (businessman) =

Serbian businessman

- Born: Dragan Šolak; 19 July 1964 (age 62); Kragujevac, SR Serbia, Yugoslavia
- Occupation: Businessman
- Known for: United Group, Sport Republic

Dragan Šolak (born 19 July 1964) is a Serbian billionaire businessman and media mogul, who is chairman of EFL Championship club Southampton. He is the founder and majority owner of the United Group media conglomerate. Šolak founded United in 2000 and according to Nedeljnik, as of December 2024, Šolak's net worth stood at stood an estimated €1.7 billion, making him the second-richest individual in Serbia.

== Early life and education ==
Šolak was born in 1964 in Kragujevac. He later moved to Belgrade for university but left to focus on business opportunities. In 1990, Šolak started a production business, one of the first in Yugoslavia. Following the 1992 Bosnian war, Šolak spent a decade abroad working in intellectual property and copyright. In 2000, he started a local cable television network in his hometown that later grew with international funding. In 2014, that network became United Group.

== Career ==
=== United Group ===
Initially starting as just a small cable operator in central Serbia, the company has since become one of the most dominant media companies in Southeast Europe, providing broadband, mobile and TV services in eight countries. Šolak was chief executive for United Group for eight years. He became chairman in 2008, and he remains an advisor to the board as of 2022. He retains a 33% share in United Group.

=== Sport Republic ===
Šolak is the lead investor and chairman of investment firm Sport Republic. In January 2022, Sport Republic became the owners of English club Southampton which bought 80% of the shares in the club from Chinese businessman Gao Jisheng for about £100m. Following Southampton's relegation from the Premier League after Sport Republic's first full season in charge, Šolak admitted that the club's owners were too distant to have a full understanding of what was happening and pledged that they would be more involved in future. In September 2022, Šolak invested £48 million into the firm and in 2023, he contributed an additional £15 million. The money was intended for general operations and also to highlight Šolak's commitment to the club.

The investment firm also acquired a 70% controlling stake in Turkish club Göztepe in August 2022 and became majority shareholders of French club Valenciennes in July 2023.

Following Henrik Kraft's decision to step down as chairman of Southampton on 14 January 2025, Šolak took on the role. In June 2025, he denied claims that he was looking to sell Southampton.

== N1 expose pre-election political manoeuvring ==
On 13 May 2023, the Slovenian information portal N1info, owned by United Media, reported extensive and irregular investigations conducted by the Slovenian Office for Money Laundering Prevention in December 2021. The investigations occurred amidst a politically charged atmosphere in Slovenia as the elections approached. Evidence obtained suggested that the head of the office, Damjan Žugelj, appointed by the SDS party, facing time constraints, received an anonymous tip enabling him to initiate the investigation, presumably in the context of a pre-election agreement between Serbian President Aleksandar Vučić and former Slovenian Prime Minister Janez Janša to gather potentially damaging information on their opponents through the respective anti-money laundering offices. Janša has denied the allegations of an agreement with Vučić, while Žugelj has characterised the N1info portal's publications as political revenge.

On 13 October 2023 National Bureau of Investigation arrested Damjan Žugelj, former director of the Office for Money Laundering Prevention, and his closest associates on suspicion of abuse of office. NBI said that they are being prosecuted for unlawfully looking into 224 bank accounts, allegedly also including Dragan Šolak.
