= USS Abingdon =

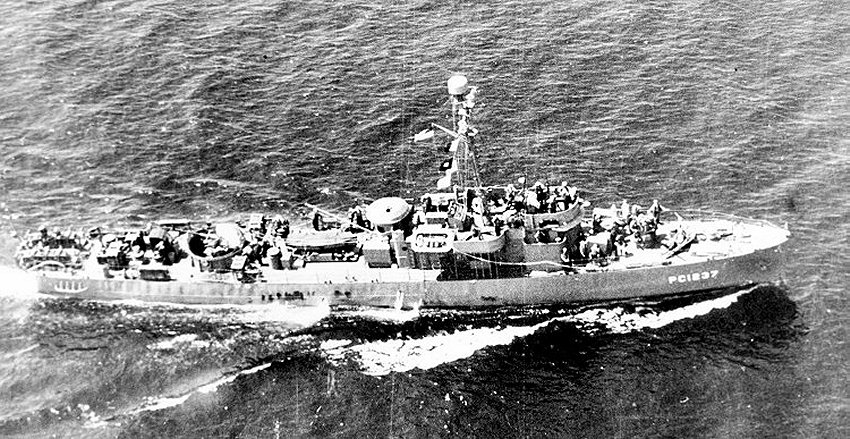
- On Naval Reserve duty in the Great Lakes c. 1948

History

United States
- Name: PC-1237 (1943-1956); Abingdon (1956-1959)
- Namesake: Town of Abingdon, Virginia
- Builder: Consolidated Shipbuilding Corp., Morris Heights, New York
- Yard number: 3141
- Laid down: 14 February 1943
- Launched: 3 April 1943
- Sponsored by: Mrs. David Challinor
- Commissioned: 26 July 1943
- Decommissioned: October 1949
- In service: July 1946
- Renamed: Abingdon, 15 February 1956
- Stricken: 1 April 1959
- Identification: Hull symbol: PC-1237; Code letters:NCLZ
- Fate: Unknown

General characteristics
- Class & type: PC-461-class submarine chaser
- Displacement: 280 long tons (284 t) (standard); 450 long tons (457 t) (full load)
- Length: 173 ft 8 in (52.93 m)
- Beam: 23 ft (7.0 m)
- Draft: 10 ft 10 in (3.30 m)
- Installed power: 2 × Hooven-Owens-Rentschler R-99DA diesel engines (Serial No. 7021 and 7022); 2,880 bhp (2,150 kW)
- Propulsion: Westinghouse single reduction gear; 2 × shafts
- Speed: 20.2 kn (37.4 km/h; 23.2 mph)
- Complement: 65
- Armament: 1 × 3 in (76 mm)/50 caliber gun; 1 × 40 mm (2 in) Bofors gun; 2 × 20 mm (1 in) Oerlikon cannons; 2 × depth charge tracks; 4 × depth charge projectors

PC-1237 was a PC-461-class submarine chaser in the service of the United States Navy. She was later given the name Abingdon after the town of Abingdon, Virginia.

PC-1237, hull No. 3141, was laid down on 14 February 1943 at Consolidated Shipbuilding Corp., in Morris Heights, New York; launched on 3 April 1943, sponsored by Mrs. David Challinor; and commissioned at the New York Navy Yard on 26 July 1943 with Lieutenant J. F. Weller, Jr., USNR, in command.

== Service history ==
=== World War II ===
After fitting out, PC-1237 departed New York on 10 August 1943 for New London, Connecticut, arriving there the following day. The submarine chaser then conducted tests under the auspices of the Bureau of Ships for the Underwater Sound Laboratory at New London, Connecticut for the remainder of August. PC-1237 cleared that port on 1 September 1943 for points south; proceeding via Tompkinsville, the ship reached Miami soon thereafter and commenced shakedown training. She completed these evolutions early in October and, proceeding by way of Key West arrived in Guantánamo Bay, Cuba, on 12 September.

PC-1237 began escorting convoys between Guantánamo Bay and Trinidad soon thereafter, occasionally touching at Kingston, Jamaica, and San Juan, Puerto Rico, during that time period. She performed that duty until early in 1945. At the beginning of February 1945, the submarine chaser was reassigned to temporary duty conducting tests at Antigua for the Naval Research Laboratory, an assignment that occupied her through the remainder of World War II and the early months of 1946. Late in this period, she visited Frederikstad, St. Croix, in the Virgin Islands, for a port call on Navy Day, 27 October 1945.

=== Post-war operations ===
On 24 May 1946, PC-1237 departed San Juan and began a voyage that took her northward along the east coast of the United States, touching at Miami and Norfolk en route, and then up the St. Lawrence River to the Great Lakes. There, the ship began training naval reservists of the 9th Naval District.

PC-1237 continued naval reserve training duty until she was placed out of commission, in reserve, in October 1949, and was berthed at Norfolk with the Atlantic Reserve Fleet for almost a decade. During that time, in February 1956, she was named Abingdon. Her name was struck from the Navy list on 1 April 1959, but her subsequent fate is not known.
