= Abingdon Motorcycles =

British motorcycle manufacturer

- Type: Private
- Industry: Motorcycle
- Founded: 1903
- Defunct: 1925 (AKD 1933)
- Fate: Ceased motorcycle production
- Successor: AKD (Abingdon King Dick)
- Headquarters: Birmingham, UK
- Products: Motorcycles, mechanics tools and chains

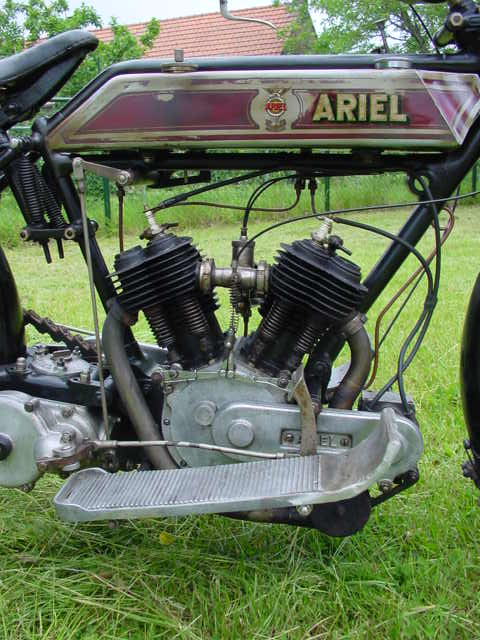
1915 Ariel V-Twin with 700 cc Abingdon engine

Abingdon Motorcycles was a British motorcycle manufacturer in Tyseley, Birmingham between 1903 and 1925. It was renamed AKD (Abingdon King Dick) in 1926 and produced single cylinder motorcycles until 1933, when they concentrated on "King Dick" mechanics' tools.

== History ==
The tool and chain manufacturers Abingdon Engineering was founded in 1856 and started making motorcycles in 1903, when the industry was still very new, with engines from a number of manufacturers before the company developed their own Abingdon four-stroke 350 cc single and 794 cc V-twin engines, which were used by Ariel and Invicta. Much of the production was exported to the Commonwealth countries. One innovation introduced by Abingdon was the first telescopic shock absorber. Motorcycles of the day often had no front suspension or some form of springs, but Abingdon devised the "Abingdon Spring Fork", a coil sprung, telescopic shock absorber.

The First World War halted production but they continued in 1919 with the V-twin and 499 cc and 623 cc single cylinder motorcycles.

The company was renamed AKD (Abingdon King Dick) in 1926 and concentrated production on 147cc to 346cc single cylinder motorcycles until 1933, when they decided to concentrate on their successful range of "King Dick" mechanics' tools.

== King Dick tools ==
The Abingdon King Dick tool company still exists, and sponsors the Castrol-Honda British Supersport Motorcycle squad. The company still manufactures its range of King Dick brand mechanics tools in the UK.

== See also ==
- Abingdon (1922 automobile)
- List of motorcycles of the 1910s
- List of motorcycles of the 1920s
