= 2027 UEFA European Under-17 Championship qualification =

Tournament details
- Dates: Round 1: 23 September – 17 November 2026; Round 2: Spring 2027
- Teams: 54 (from 1 confederation)

Tournament statistics
- Matches played: 77
- Goals scored: 345 (4.48 per match)
- Top scorer(s): (Germany) Bastian Assomo (8 goals)
- All statistics correct as of 17 November 2026.

The 2027 UEFA European Under-17 Championship qualification is an under-17 men's national football team competition that will determine the seven teams joining the automatically qualified hosts Latvia in the 2027 UEFA European Under-17 Championship final tournament.

Russia were excluded from the tournament due to the ongoing invasion of Ukraine. Therefore, including host Latvia, 54 teams entered this qualification competition. The Round 1 of the qualification will be played in the Autumn of 2026, while the Round 2 will be played in spring 2027. Players born on or after 1 January 2010 are eligible to participate.

== Format ==
The qualification consists of two rounds; both of them consist of several groups, which are played as single-round-robin mini-tournaments, with one team from each group selected as the host after the draw.

- Round 1: 54 teams were drawn into 14 groups of three or four. The top two teams from each group advanced to Round 2 League A; the other teams advanced to Round 2 League B.
- Round 2:
  - League A: 28 teams will be drawn into seven groups of four. The group winners will qualify for the final tournament. If Latvia, as the host of the final tournament, wins one of these groups, the best runner-up team will also qualify. Teams that will finish fourth will be relegated to Round 1 League B for the next season. Furthermore, the 11 teams highest in the overall rankings qualify for the 2028 FIFA U-17 World Cup.
  - League B: 26 teams will be drawn into seven groups of three or four. The group winners will be promoted to Round 1 League A for the next season.

=== Tiebreakers ===
In a group, teams are ranked according to points (3 points for a win, 1 point for a draw, 0 points for a loss), and if tied on points, the following tiebreaking criteria were applied, in the order given, to determine the rankings (Regulations Articles 14.01 and 14.02):

1. Points in head-to-head matches among tied teams;
2. Goal difference in head-to-head matches among tied teams;
3. Goals scored in head-to-head matches among tied teams;
4. If more than two teams are tied, and after applying all head-to-head criteria above, a subset of teams are still tied, all head-to-head criteria above are reapplied exclusively to this subset of teams;
5. Goal difference in all group matches;
6. Goals scored in all group matches;
7. Penalty shoot-out if only two teams had the same number of points, and they met in the last round of the group and were tied after applying all criteria above (not used if more than two teams had the same number of points, or if their rankings were not relevant for qualification for the next stage);
8. Disciplinary points (red card = 3 points, yellow card = 1 point, expulsion for two yellow cards in one match = 3 points);
9. Position in the applicable ranking:
  1. for teams in Round 1, position in the 2024–25 qualification overall rankings;
  2. for teams in Round 2, position in the Round 1 overall rankings.

== Round 1 ==
=== Draw ===
The draw for the Round 1 was held on 10 December 2025 at the UEFA headquarters in Nyon, Switzerland.

The teams were seeded according to their results in Round 1 of the 2025–26 qualification. The matches of the first-, the second- and the third-placed teams against the fourth-placed teams in their group did not count towards this ranking. To determine this ranking, the following criteria were followed (Regulations Article 15.03):

1. higher position in the group;
2. higher number of points;
3. superior goal difference;
4. higher number of goals scored;
5. lower disciplinary points (red card = 3 points, yellow card = 1 point, expulsion for two yellow cards in one match = 3 points).

The teams were allocated to four drawing pots. Teams in the same pot would be drawn into different groups. Each group contains one team from Pot A, one team from Pot B, one team from Pot C, and 12 groups contain one team from Pot D. Based on the decisions taken by the UEFA Emergency Panel, the following pairs of teams could not be drawn in the same group: Spain and Gibraltar, Belarus and Ukraine, Kosovo and Serbia. Due to the current situation, Ukraine, Israel and Belarus cannot host tournaments on their territory.

Pot A
Team	Position in group	Pts.	GD	GS
Spain	Winner, Group 4	6	9	9
Czech Republic	Winner, Group 2	6	8	9
Belgium	Winner, Group 5	6	8	8
Germany	Winner, Group 13	6	7	8
Iceland	Winner, Group 14	6	5	9
Republic of Ireland	Winner, Group 6	6	5	5
Sweden	Winner, Group 3	6	4	4
Turkey	Winner, Group 7	6	3	6
France	Winner, Group 9	4	5	6
Portugal	Winner, Group 12	4	2	5
Montenegro	Winner, Group 1	4	1	3
Slovakia	Winner, Group 10	4	1	2
Cyprus	Winner, Group 11	4	1	1
Kazakhstan	Winner, Group 8	3	–2	3

Pot B
Team	Position in group	Pts.	GD	GS
Austria	Runner-up, Group 6	3	2	5
Scotland	Runner-up, Group 3	3	1	4
Greece	Runner-up, Group 14	3	0	5
Croatia	Runner-up, Group 8	3	0	4
Italy	Runner-up, Group 1	3	0	3
Serbia	Runner-up, Group 7	3	0	3
Slovenia	Runner-up, Group 12	3	–1	4
Norway	Runner-up, Group 5	3	–1	4
Poland	Runner-up, Group 13	3	–2	2
Denmark	Runner-up, Group 4	3	–3	3
Romania	Runner-up, Group 9	2	0	2
Switzerland	Runner-up, Group 10	2	0	2
Northern Ireland	Runner-up, Group 11	2	0	1
North Macedonia	Runner-up, Group 2	1	–2	2

Pot C
Team	Position in group	Pts.	GD	GS
Netherlands	Third, Group 8	3	2	6
Ukraine	Third, Group 1	1	–1	2
Wales	Third, Group 12	1	–1	2
Finland	Third, Group 11	1	–1	1
Bulgaria	Third, Group 10	1	–1	1
Israel	Third, Group 9	1	–5	1
Hungary	Third, Group 2	1	–6	3
Bosnia and Herzegovina	Third, Group 7	0	–3	1
Georgia	Third, Group 14	0	–5	2
Lithuania	Third, Group 3	0	–5	1
Luxembourg	Third, Group 13	0	–5	0
Latvia	Third, Group 4	0	–6	2
Belarus	Third, Group 5	0	–7	3
Faroe Islands	Third, Group 6	0	–7	1

Pot D
Team	Position in group	Pts.	GD	GS
Albania	Last, Group 8	1	–4	2
Moldova	Last, Group 5	1	–7	1
Malta	Last, Group 7	1	–9	2
Kosovo	Last, Group 6	0	–4	5
England	Last, Group 3	0	–4	3
Armenia	Last, Group 11	0	–4	1
San Marino	Last, Group 10	0	–9	0
Andorra	Last, Group 4	0	–10	2
Estonia	Last, Group 1	0	–10	1
Azerbaijan	Last, Group 9	0	–16	2
Liechtenstein	Last, Group 12	0	–26	0
Gibraltar	Last, Group 2	0	–30	0

Times are CET/CEST, (Note: CEST (UTC+2) for dates up to 25 October 2026, and CET (UTC+1) for dates thereafter.) as listed by UEFA (local times, if different, are in parentheses).

=== Group 1 ===
Pos	Team	Pld	W	D	L	GF	GA	GD	Pts	Qualification
1	Denmark (H)	3	3	0	0	11	2	+9	9	Round 2 League A
2	Wales	3	1	1	1	4	4	0	4	Round 2 League A
3	Republic of Ireland	3	1	0	2	6	6	0	3	Round 2 League B
4	Estonia	3	0	1	2	3	12	−9	1	Round 2 League B

Source: UEFA
Rules for classification: Tiebreakers
(H) Hosts
11 November 2026
12:00

Republic of Ireland	5–0	Estonia
Daly 27' (pen.), 58', 65' (pen.); Keating 67'; Fay 71'	Report

Helsingør Stadion, Helsingør
Attendance: 103
Referee: Tural Kurbanov (Azerbaijan)
11 November 2026
17:30

Wales	0–2	Denmark
	Report	Mortensen 87'; Mathiesen 89'

Helsingør Stadion, Helsingør
Attendance: 620
Referee: Ilioski Vlatko (North Macedonia)

14 November 2026
12:00

Republic of Ireland	0–2	Wales
	Report	Donczew 57'; Roberts 69'

Helsingør Stadion, Helsingør
Attendance: 54
Referee: Arnes Talic (Austria)
14 November 2026
17:30

Denmark	5–1	Estonia
Lauridsen 4'; Freiesleben 25'; Thomsen 31' (pen.); Ekstrand 68', 90+3'	Report	Krasnov 56'

Helsingør Stadion, Helsingør
Attendance: 523
Referee: Ilioski Vlatko (North Macedonia)

17 November 2026
15:00

Denmark	4–1	Republic of Ireland
Ekstrand 16' (pen.), 49' (pen.); Mortensen 24'; Christensen 27'	Report	Marshall 30'

Brøndby Stadium, Brøndby
Attendance: 520
Referee: Arnes Talic (Austria)
17 November 2026
15:00

Estonia	2–2	Wales
Zotov 30' (pen.); Kaalma 62'	Report	Holdsworth 37'; Huxley 75'

Helsingør Stadion, Helsingør
Attendance: 15
Referee: Tural Kurbanov (Azerbaijan)

=== Group 2 ===
Pos	Team	Pld	W	D	L	GF	GA	GD	Pts	Qualification
1	Germany (H)	3	3	0	0	15	0	+15	9	Round 2 League A
2	Lithuania	3	1	1	1	5	7	−2	4	Round 2 League A
3	Northern Ireland	3	1	0	2	6	8	−2	3	Round 2 League B
4	Azerbaijan	3	0	1	2	1	12	−11	1	Round 2 League B

Source: UEFA
Rules for classification: Tiebreakers
(H) Hosts
11 November 2026
11:00

Germany	7–0	Azerbaijan
Barde 14'; Ciglar 33'; Güther 47'; Assomo 63', 74', 79', 84'	Report

DFB-Campus, Frankfurt am Main
Attendance: 229
Referee: Danilo Nikolić (Serbia)
11 November 2026
15:30

Lithuania	4–2	Northern Ireland
Korvel 24'; Šluta 32'; Melaikis 63', 65'	Report	Mulholland 1', 19'

DFB-Campus, Frankfurt am Main
Attendance: 42
Referee: Jan Všetečka (Czech Republic)

14 November 2026
11:00

Germany	4–0	Lithuania
Assomo 6', 12', 45+3' (pen.); Barde 79'	Report

DFB-Campus, Frankfurt am Main
Attendance: 370
Referee: Fotios Polychronis (Greece)
14 November 2026
15:30

Northern Ireland	4–0	Azerbaijan
O'Kaine 52', 80'; Vaugh 74', 77'	Report

DFB-Campus, Frankfurt am Main
Attendance: 67
Referee: Jan Všetečka (Czech Republic)

17 November 2026
11:00

Northern Ireland	0–4	Germany
	Report	Assomo 22'; Matondo 47'; Güther 57'; Passariello 84'

DFB-Campus, Frankfurt am Main
Attendance: 163
Referee: Danilo Nikolić (Serbia)
17 November 2026
11:00

Azerbaijan	1–1	Lithuania
Balakishiyev 64'	Report	Merliūnas 49'

Nidda-Sportfeld, Frankfurt am Main
Attendance: 10
Referee: Fotios Polychronis (Greece)

=== Group 3 ===
Pos	Team	Pld	W	D	L	GF	GA	GD	Pts	Qualification
1	Switzerland	3	2	1	0	15	0	+15	7	Round 2 League A
2	Spain	3	2	0	1	10	2	+8	6	Round 2 League A
3	Israel	3	1	1	1	14	2	+12	4	Round 2 League B
4	Liechtenstein (H)	3	0	0	3	0	35	−35	0	Round 2 League B

Source: UEFA
Rules for classification: Tiebreakers
(H) Hosts
12 October 2026
12:00

Israel	0–0	Switzerland
	Report

LFV Campus, Schaan
Attendance: 250
Referee: Martin Zhivkov Velikov (Bulgaria)
12 October 2026
17:00

Spain	8–0	Liechtenstein
Garcés 17'; J. Sanchez 22'; Torondel 25', 48', 64'; A. Sánchez 50'; Aranda 53', 87'	Report

LFV Campus, Schaan
Attendance: 726
Referee: Konstantinos Fellas (Cyprus)

15 October 2026
12:00

Spain	2–0	Israel
Mitxelena 47'; Aranda 67'	Report

LFV Campus, Schaan
Attendance: 225
Referee: Kristaps Ratnieks (Latvia)
15 October 2026
17:00

Switzerland	13–0	Liechtenstein
Cavka 12', 20', 45' (pen.); Nobile 15' (o.g.); Hare 25'; Arslan 26', 29'; Kele 38', 50'; Zanovello 51', 54', 90+2'; Dzaferi 79'	Report

LFV Campus, Schaan
Attendance: 532
Referee: Martin Zhivkov Velikov (Bulgaria)

18 October 2026
13:00

Switzerland	2–0	Spain
Kele 35'; Cavka 90+4'	Report

Rheinpark Stadion, Vaduz
Attendance: 920
Referee: Konstantinos Fellas (Cyprus)
18 October 2026
13:00

Liechtenstein	0–14	Israel
	Report	Matheis 14' (o.g.); Goldenberg 22', 38', 55'; Dabah 31', 50', 90+5'; Koriat 32'; Dorra 58', 64'; Azrane 71', 76'; Kalfa 80'; Yonatanov 89'

LFV Campus, Schaan
Attendance: 273
Referee: Kristaps Ratnieks (Latvia)

=== Group 4 ===
Pos	Team	Pld	W	D	L	GF	GA	GD	Pts	Qualification
1	Finland	3	3	0	0	9	5	+4	9	Round 2 League A
2	Albania (H)	3	1	1	1	4	4	0	4	Round 2 League A
3	Scotland	3	1	0	2	10	10	0	3	Round 2 League B
4	Sweden	3	0	1	2	4	8	−4	1	Round 2 League B

Source: UEFA
Rules for classification: Tiebreakers
(H) Hosts
11 November 2026
14:00

Sweden	0–0	Albania
	Report

Elbasan Arena, Elbasan
Attendance: 230
Referee: Andreu Simarro (Andorra)
11 November 2026
15:00

Finland	4–3	Scotland
Ahen 4'; Launiala 6'; Babiker 51'; Saikkonen 76'	Report	Scally 14'; Fergusson 44'; Watt 87'

House of Football, Tirana
Attendance: 150
Referee: Aleko Aptsiauri (Georgia)

14 November 2026
14:00

Scotland	1–3	Albania
Ngwenya 8'	Report	Ramadani 60'; Dybeli 72', 90+4'

Elbasan Arena, Elbasan
Attendance: 500
Referee: Andreu Simarro (Andorra)
14 November 2026
15:00

Sweden	1–2	Finland
Bjernvall 80' (pen.)	Report	Launiala 33'; Ahen 89'

House of Football, Tirana
Attendance: 45
Referee: Aaron O’Dowd (Ireland)

17 November 2026
14:00

Scotland	6–3	Sweden
Stephens 27', 53'; Watt 56' (pen.), 65' (pen.), 79'; Rankin 88' (pen.)	Report	Hansas 11'; Andersson 43', 75'

House of Football, Tirana
Attendance: 100
Referee: Aleko Aptsiauri (Georgia)
17 November 2026
14:00

Albania	1–3	Finland
Rrena 15'	Report	Launiala 61' (pen.), 64'; Aho 90+7'

Elbasan Arena, Elbasan
Attendance: 570
Referee: Aaron O’Dowd (Ireland)

=== Group 5 ===
Pos	Team	Pld	W	D	L	GF	GA	GD	Pts	Qualification
1	Slovakia	3	3	0	0	13	4	+9	9	Round 2 League A
2	Norway	3	1	1	1	15	5	+10	4	Round 2 League A
3	Netherlands	3	1	1	1	15	7	+8	4	Round 2 League B
4	Malta (H)	3	0	0	3	1	28	−27	0	Round 2 League B

Source: UEFA
Rules for classification: Tiebreakers
(H) Hosts
11 November 2026
11:00

Netherlands	2–2	Norway
Myrvold 26' (o.g.); Darko 65'	Report	Bakkane 59' (pen.); Haugen 62'

Centenary Stadium, Ta' Qali
Attendance: 88
Referee: Lasse Læbel Graagaard (Denmark)
11 November 2026
14:30

Slovakia	6–0	Malta
Lembakoali 15', 31', 37'; Žofčák 43', 82'; Spoko 86'	Report

Centenary Stadium, Ta' Qali
Attendance: 97
Referee: Dovydas Švėgžda (Lithuania)

14 November 2026
11:00

Slovakia	4–2	Netherlands
Lembakoali 6', 84', 87' (pen.); Šubert 54'	Report	Vis 55'; Grootfaam 68'

Centenary Stadium, Ta' Qali
Attendance: 94
Referee: Dovydas Švėgžda (Lithuania)
14 November 2026
14:30

Norway	11–0	Malta
Rajkovic 7'; Bakkane 20', 26', 31', 51'; Danbolt 42'; Skjeldestad 45+1'; Fiskum Larsen 55'; Granaas 81'; Thomsen 88'; Døvle-Lie 90+2'	Report

Centenary Stadium, Ta' Qali
Attendance: 111
Referee: Ozan Ergün (Turkey)

17 November 2026
14:00

Norway	2–3	Slovakia
Rajkovic 50', 77'	Report	Charamza 6'; Lembakoali 34' (pen.); Žofčák 57'

National Stadium, Ta' Qali
Attendance: 40
Referee: Ozan Ergün (Turkey)
17 November 2026
14:00

Malta	1–11	Netherlands
Wright 19' (pen.)	Report	Holder 32', 45+1', 59', 75'; Ballari 36', 51' (pen.); Rensen 49'; Darko 50', 90+4'; Grootfaam 81'; Van Loon 90'

Centenary Stadium, Ta' Qali
Attendance: 84
Referee: Lasse Læbel Graagaard (Denmark)

=== Group 6 ===
Pos	Team	Pld	W	D	L	GF	GA	GD	Pts	Qualification
1	Portugal (H)	3	2	1	0	7	2	+5	7	Round 2 League A
2	Serbia	3	2	0	1	8	3	+5	6	Round 2 League A
3	Bulgaria	3	1	1	1	6	5	+1	4	Round 2 League B
4	Andorra	3	0	0	3	1	12	−11	0	Round 2 League B

Source: UEFA
Rules for classification: Tiebreakers
(H) Hosts
12 November 2026
16:00

Portugal	4–0	Andorra
Farinha 20', 65'; Miranda 50' (pen.); Cabral 60'	Report

Cidade do Futebol, Oeiras
Attendance: 198
Referee: Ross Hardie (Scotland)
12 November 2026
16:00

Bulgaria	1–3	Serbia
Vukoje 70' (o.g.)	Report	Lazović 17'; Banković 29'; Prijović 90+1'

Real Sport Club, Queluz
Attendance: 35
Referee: Cihan Aydın (Turkey)

14 November 2026
12:00

Serbia	4–0	Andorra
Ilić 9'; Prijović 45'; Ljuca 59'; Lazović 64'	Report

Cidade do Futebol, Oeiras
Attendance: 60
Referee: Cihan Aydın (Turkey)
14 November 2026
16:00

Portugal	1–1	Bulgaria
Pereira 59'	Report	Petrov 74'

Cidade do Futebol, Oeiras
Attendance: 276
Referee: Simon Bourdeaud'hui (Belgium)

17 November 2026
12:00

Serbia	1–2	Portugal
Ilić 89'	Report	Baldé 47'; Pereira 62'

Cidade do Futebol, Oeiras
Attendance: 234
Referee: Simon Bourdeaud'hui (Belgium)
17 November 2026
12:00

Andorra	1–4	Bulgaria
Ber 66'	Report	Nikiforov 4'; Nedelchev 37' (pen.); Mitrushev 82'; Ivanov 89'

Cidade do Futebol, Oeiras
Attendance: 16
Referee: Ross Hardie (Scotland)

=== Group 7 ===
Pos	Team	Pld	W	D	L	GF	GA	GD	Pts	Qualification
1	Iceland	3	3	0	0	10	3	+7	9	Round 2 League A
2	Bosnia and Herzegovina (H)	3	2	0	1	12	4	+8	6	Round 2 League A
3	Greece	3	1	0	2	6	7	−1	3	Round 2 League B
4	Gibraltar	3	0	0	3	3	17	−14	0	Round 2 League B

Source: UEFA
Rules for classification: Tiebreakers
(H) Hosts
23 September 2026
14:00

Iceland	4–0	Gibraltar
Þorfinnsson 25'; Brynjarsson 32'; Ottesen 38'; Cordon 90' (o.g.)	Report

FF BH Football Training Centre, Zenica
Attendance: 20
Referee: Gal Levi (Israel)
23 September 2026
14:00

Bosnia and Herzegovina	2–0	Greece
Leto 65'; Mehić 88'	Report

Mladost Stadium, Kakanj
Attendance: 158
Referee: Dalibor Černý (Czech Republic)

26 September 2026
14:00

Iceland	3–1	Bosnia and Herzegovina
Garðarsson 28', 72'; Þórðarson 87'	Report	Mušanović 17'

FF BH Football Training Centre, Zenica
Attendance: 156
Referee: Wojciech Myc (Poland)
26 September 2026
14:00

Greece	4–2	Gibraltar
Veridiano 21'; Tentolouris 24'; Hinz 50' (pen.); Kakalis 78'	Report	Hill De Oliveira 38'; Payas 56'

Mladost Stadium, Kakanj
Attendance: 25
Referee: Dalibor Černý (Czech Republic)

29 September 2026
14:00

Greece	2–3	Iceland
Fotis 11'; Hinz 39'	Report	Jóhannsson 1'; Garðarsson 35'; Gíslason 78'

Mladost Stadium, Kakanj
Attendance: 30
Referee: Wojciech Myc (Poland)
29 September 2026
14:00

Gibraltar	1–9	Bosnia and Herzegovina
Sanchez 62'	Report	Milijević 16'; Mušanović 26', 56'; Trivunović 34'; Leto 58'; Bujak 65'; Huremović 75'; Bajić 79', 86'

FF BH Football Training Centre, Zenica
Attendance: 145
Referee: Gal Levi (Israel)

=== Group 8 ===
Pos	Team	Pld	W	D	L	GF	GA	GD	Pts	Qualification
1	Czech Republic	3	3	0	0	10	2	+8	9	Round 2 League A
2	Belarus	3	2	0	1	5	4	+1	6	Round 2 League A
3	Slovenia	3	1	0	2	5	10	−5	3	Round 2 League B
4	Moldova (H)	3	0	0	3	2	6	−4	0	Round 2 League B

Source: UEFA
Rules for classification: Tiebreakers
(H) Hosts
16 October 2026
12:00

Czech Republic	2–0	Moldova
Nádeníček 8'; Soused 73'	Report

Zimbru Stadium, Chișinău
Attendance: 207
Referee: Aaron Wyn Jones (Wales)
16 October 2026
12:00

Belarus	3–1	Slovenia
Tsimafeyeu 11' (pen.); Tratsiak 79'; Salianik 90+5'	Report	Vučić 21' (pen.)

Stadionul CPSM, Vadul lui Vodă
Attendance: 15
Referee: Yura Mahtesyan (Armenia)

19 October 2026
12:00

Czech Republic	3–1	Belarus
Šafr 55'; Hanel 76', 87'	Report	Salianik 2'

Stadionul CPSM, Vadul lui Vodă
Attendance: 40
Referee: Yura Mahtesyan (Armenia)
19 October 2026
12:00

Slovenia	3–2	Moldova
Križanič 67', 79'; Jevšnik 88'	Report	Girnet 45+1', 45+2'

Zimbru Stadium, Chișinău
Attendance: 167
Referee: Ioannis Christodoulou (Cyprus)

22 October 2026
12:00

Slovenia	1–5	Czech Republic
Križanič 63'	Report	Pernica 7', 31'; Hanel 25'; Dočekal 27', 61'

Stadionul CPSM, Vadul lui Vodă
Attendance: 25
Referee: Aaron Wyn Jones (Wales)
22 October 2026
12:00

Moldova	0–1	Belarus
	Report	Tsimafeyeu 26'

Zimbru Stadium, Chișinău
Attendance: 171
Referee: Ioannis Christodoulou (Cyprus)

=== Group 9 ===
Pos	Team	Pld	W	D	L	GF	GA	GD	Pts	Qualification
1	England (H)	3	3	0	0	11	1	+10	9	Round 2 League A
2	Poland	3	1	0	2	8	8	0	3 (Note: Ranked on head-to-head goal difference: Poland +2, Ukraine 0, Montenegro −2)	Round 2 League A
3	Ukraine	3	1	0	2	3	6	−3	3	Round 2 League B
4	Montenegro	3	1	0	2	5	12	−7	3	Round 2 League B

Source: UEFA
Rules for classification: Tiebreakers
(H) Hosts
Notes:
11 November 2026
15:00

Montenegro	1–6	England
Vukčević 44'	Report	Nicoll-Jazuli 6', 28', 51'; Parker 22', 70'; Abe 64'

St George's Park National Football Centre, Burton upon Trent
Attendance: 123
Referee: Karel Rouček (Czech Republic)
11 November 2026
20:00

Ukraine	3–2	Poland
Dzyurynets 38', 71'; Rybak 75'	Report	Leśniak 51'; Bakhno 59'

St George's Park National Football Centre, Burton upon Trent
Attendance: 72
Referee: Karl Koppel (Estonia)

14 November 2026
15:00

Poland	0–2	England
	Report	Blake 34'; Abe 83'

St George's Park National Football Centre, Burton upon Trent
Attendance: 209
Referee: Mateo Tozan (Slovenia)
14 November 2026
20:00

Montenegro	1–0	Ukraine
Ivanović 70'	Report

St George's Park National Football Centre, Burton upon Trent
Attendance: 38
Referee: Karl Koppel (Estonia)

17 November 2026
19:30

Poland	6–3	Montenegro
Madej 8' (pen.), 41', 45+1' (pen.); Stępniewski 49'; Garwoliński 53', 76'	Report	Milačić 22', 82'; Vukčević 24'

St George's Park National Football Centre, Burton upon Trent
Attendance: 28
Referee: Mateo Tozan (Slovenia)
17 November 2026
19:30

England	3–0	Ukraine
Johnson 2'; Fejokwu 73'; Bernard 89'	Report

St George's Park National Football Centre, Burton upon Trent
Attendance: 112
Referee: Karel Rouček (Czech Republic)

=== Group 10 ===
Pos	Team	Pld	W	D	L	GF	GA	GD	Pts	Qualification
1	Italy	3	3	0	0	11	0	+11	9	Round 2 League A
2	France	3	2	0	1	7	1	+6	6	Round 2 League A
3	Armenia (H)	3	0	1	2	0	8	−8	1	Round 2 League B
4	Luxembourg	3	0	1	2	0	9	−9	1	Round 2 League B

Source: UEFA
Rules for classification: Tiebreakers
(H) Hosts
11 November 2026
09:00

Luxembourg	0–6	Italy
	Report	Borsa 10' (pen.), 63'; Scaglione 50'; Elena 61'; Sorrentino 89'; Pipito' 90+1'

Abovyan city stadium, Abovyan
Attendance: 50
Referee: Bálint Kišš (Slovakia)
11 November 2026
12:00

France	4–0	Armenia
Diallo 5', 16', 28'; Kharbouch 63' (pen.)	Report

FFA Academy Stadium, Yerevan
Attendance: 500
Referee: Mathias Støfringshaug (Norway)

14 November 2026
09:00

France	3–0	Luxembourg
Bousserra 5'; Gervelain 32'; Kharbouch 77'	Report

Abovyan city stadium, Abovyan
Attendance: 70
Referee: Bálint Kišš (Slovakia)
14 November 2026
12:00

Italy	4–0	Armenia
Elena 16'; Furlan 31'; Egharevba 49'; Borsa 77'	Report

FFA Academy Stadium, Yerevan
Attendance: 200
Referee: Roman Jitari (Moldova)

17 November 2026
11:00

Italy	1–0	France
Bernamonte 47'	Report

Abovyan city stadium, Abovyan
Attendance: 50
Referee: Mathias Støfringshaug (Norway)
17 November 2026
11:00

Armenia	0–0	Luxembourg
	Report

FFA Academy Stadium, Yerevan
Attendance: 200
Referee: Roman Jitari (Moldova)

=== Group 11 ===
Pos	Team	Pld	W	D	L	GF	GA	GD	Pts	Qualification
1	Turkey (H)	3	3	0	0	11	0	+11	9	Round 2 League A
2	North Macedonia	3	2	0	1	4	5	−1	6	Round 2 League A
3	Hungary	3	1	0	2	5	9	−4	3	Round 2 League B
4	San Marino	3	0	0	3	2	8	−6	0	Round 2 League B

Source: UEFA
Rules for classification: Tiebreakers
(H) Hosts
11 November 2026
10:00

Hungary	2–3	North Macedonia
Horváth 8'; Farkas 48'	Report	Ristikj 55', 86', 90+4'

Yavuz Selim Stadyumu, Trabzon
Attendance: 40
Referee: Duncan Nicolson (Scotland)
11 November 2026
13:00

Turkey	4–0	San Marino
Sivaslioglu 12'; Eksiner 28'; Kabaktas 48', 89'	Report

Of İlçe Stadyumu, Trabzon
Attendance: 588
Referee: Ihar Shumilau (Belarus)

14 November 2026
10:00

North Macedonia	1–0	San Marino
Ristić 59'	Report

Kadir Özcan Antrenman Tesisleri, Trabzon
Attendance: 27
Referee: Ihar Shumilau (Belarus)
14 November 2026
13:00

Turkey	4–0	Hungary
Harman 20'; Deniz 51' (pen.); Kabaktas 64'; Piróth 74' (o.g.)	Report

Of İlçe Stadyumu, Trabzon
Attendance: 432
Referee: Mateo Erceg (Croatia)

17 November 2026
12:00

North Macedonia	0–3	Turkey
	Report	Deniz 16'; Kabaktas 42'; Sivaslioglu 59'

Of İlçe Stadyumu, Trabzon
Attendance: 550
Referee: Duncan Nicolson (Scotland)
17 November 2026
12:00

San Marino	2–3	Hungary
Mazza 5'; Mattei 43'	Report	Szegedi 20'; Bazsika 65'; Hajagos 87'

Yavuz Selim Stadyumu, Trabzon
Attendance: 42
Referee: Mateo Erceg (Croatia)

=== Group 12 ===
Pos	Team	Pld	W	D	L	GF	GA	GD	Pts	Qualification
1	Belgium	3	3	0	0	13	2	+11	9	Round 2 League A
2	Croatia (H)	3	1	1	1	6	3	+3	4	Round 2 League A
3	Kosovo	3	1	0	2	4	13	−9	3	Round 2 League B
4	Latvia	3	0	1	2	4	9	−5	1	Round 2 League B

Source: UEFA
Rules for classification: Tiebreakers
(H) Hosts
11 November 2026
11:00

Latvia	2–2	Croatia
Holtoms 65'; Jevdokimovs 81'	Report	Trajanovski 51'; Nekić 79'

Stadion Branko Čavlović-Čavlek, Karlovac
Attendance: 100
Referee: Vasil Minev (Bulgaria)
11 November 2026
12:30

Belgium	8–1	Kosovo
Ossohou 3'; Mujangi 20' (pen.), 67'; Mbambi 26', 57'; Oppenbrouwer 34'; Eriyo 59', 72'	Report	Thaqi 56'

Ivan Laljak-Ivić Stadium, Zaprešić
Attendance: 70
Referee: Anton Lashuk (Belarus)

14 November 2026
11:00

Croatia	4–0	Kosovo
Kolar 8' (pen.); Dacer 45'; Benko 74'; Nekić 89' (pen.)	Report

Stadion Branko Čavlović-Čavlek, Karlovac
Attendance: 250
Referee: Alex Johnson (Malta)
14 November 2026
12:30

Belgium	4–1	Latvia
Billiet 23'; Fossi 27'; Ossohou 52'; Mbambi 67'	Report	Aizsilnieks 45+2' (pen.)

Ivan Laljak-Ivić Stadium, Zaprešić
Attendance: 50
Referee: Anton Lashuk (Belarus)

17 November 2026
11:00

Croatia	0–1	Belgium
	Report	Mujangi 84'

Stadion Branko Čavlović-Čavlek, Karlovac
Attendance: 250
Referee: Vasil Minev (Bulgaria)
17 November 2026
11:00

Kosovo	3–1	Latvia
Kosumi 22'; Asani 50' (pen.); Thaqi 78'	Report	Mogiļevičs 2'

Ivan Laljak-Ivić Stadium, Zaprešić
Attendance: 50
Referee: Alex Johnson (Malta)

=== Group 13 ===
Pos	Team	Pld	W	D	L	GF	GA	GD	Pts	Qualification
1	Romania	2	2	0	0	6	0	+6	6	Round 2 League A
2	Cyprus (H)	2	0	1	1	2	4	−2	1	Round 2 League A
3	Faroe Islands	2	0	1	1	2	6	−4	1	Round 2 League B

Source: UEFA
Rules for classification: Tiebreakers
(H) Hosts
27 October 2026
15:00

Faroe Islands	0–4	Romania
	Report	Oniga 33', 36'; Nastac 63'; Loghin 83'

Sotira Municipal Stadium, Sotira
Attendance: 50
Referee: Igor Bosca (Moldova)

30 October 2026
15:00

Cyprus	2–2	Faroe Islands
Michail 88'; Kais 90+2'	Report	Poulsen 51'; Højgaard 67'

Ethnikos Achnas, Achnas
Attendance: 150
Referee: Igor Bosca (Moldova)

2 November 2026
15:00

Romania	2–0	Cyprus
Panagi 90+2' (o.g.); Avram 90+4'	Report

Ethnikos Achnas, Achnas
Attendance: 210
Referee: Robin Hensgens (The Netherlands)

=== Group 14 ===
Pos	Team	Pld	W	D	L	GF	GA	GD	Pts	Qualification
1	Kazakhstan	2	1	1	0	8	1	+7	4	Round 2 League A
2	Georgia (H)	2	0	2	0	1	1	0	2	Round 2 League A
3	Austria	2	0	1	1	0	7	−7	1	Round 2 League B

Source: UEFA
Rules for classification: Tiebreakers
(H) Hosts
11 November 2026
13:00

Austria	0–0	Georgia
	Report

Ramaz Shengelia Stadium, Kutaisi
Attendance: 1,500
Referee: Martin Zhivkov Velikov (Bulgaria)

14 November 2026
13:00

Kazakhstan	7–0	Austria
Chernomorets 19', 63'; Tolendi 21', 24'; Khasanov 35'; Rashidov 60'; Asan 78'	Report

Ramaz Shengelia Stadium, Kutaisi
Attendance: 60
Referee: Artem Gasparyan (Armenia)

17 November 2026
13:00

Georgia	1–1	Kazakhstan
Ochigava 42'	Report	Sadyrbayev 87'

Ramaz Shengelia Stadium, Kutaisi
Attendance: 500
Referee: Loïc Thomas (Luxembourg)

== Round 2 ==
=== Draw ===
The draw for Round 2 will be made in December 2026 at the UEFA headquarters in Nyon, Switzerland.

The 28 teams of Round 1 (top 2 of each group) will be drawn in seven groups of four teams in League A.

The teams will be seeded according to their results in Round 1 (Regulations Article 15.01). The results of matches against fourth-placed teams are not taken into account for the purposes of ranking group winners, runners-up or third-placed teams. For the purpose of ranking fourth-placed teams all matches are taken into account.

==== Teams entering League A ====
Pot 1
Team	Pos. in group	Pts.	GD	GS	DP
Belgium	1st / Group 12	6	+8	9	
Germany	1st / Group 2	6	+8	8	
Turkey	1st / Group 11	6	+7	7	
Czech Republic	1st / Group 8	6	+6	8	
Romania	1st / Group 13	6	+6	6	
Denmark	1st / Group 1	6	+5	6	
Italy	1st / Group 10	6	+5	5	3

Pot 2
Team	Pos. in group	Pts.	GD	GS	DP
England	1st / Group 9	6	+5	5	5
Slovakia	1st / Group 5	6	+3	7	
Finland	1st / Group 4	6	+3	7	
Iceland	1st / Group 7	6	+3	6	
Kazakhstan	1st / Group 13	4	+7	8	
Switzerland	1st / Group 3	4	+2	2	
Portugal	1st / Group 6	4	+1	3	

Pot 3
Team	Pos. in group	Pts.	GD	GS	DP
France	2nd / Group 10	3	+3	4	
Croatia	2nd / Group 12	3	+1	4	
Serbia	2nd / Group 6	3	+1	4	
Albania	2nd / Group 4	3	0	4	
Belarus	2nd / Group 8	3	0	4	
Bosnia and Herzegovina	2nd / Group 7	3	0	3	
Wales	2nd / Group 1	3	0	2	

Pot 4
Team	Pos. in group	Pts.	GD	GS	DP
Spain	2nd / Group 3	3	0	2	
Lithuania	2nd / Group 2	3	−2	4	
North Macedonia	2nd / Group 11	3	−2	3	
Georgia	2nd / Group 14	2	0	1	
Norway	2nd / Group 5	1	−1	4	
Cyprus	2nd / Group 13	1	−2	2	
Poland	2nd / Group 9	0	−3	2	

==== Teams entering League B ====
Pot 1
Team	Pos. in group	Pts.	GD	GS	DP
Ukraine	3rd / Group 9	3	−2	3	
Netherlands	3rd / Group 5	1	−2	4	
Bulgaria	3rd / Group 6	1	−2	2	
Israel	3rd / Group 3	1	−2	0	
Faroe Islands	3rd / Group 13	1	−4	2	
Austria	3rd / Group 14	1	−7	0	
Scotland	3rd / Group 4	0	−3	4	

Pot 2
Team	Pos. in group	Pts.	GD	GS	DP
Greece	3rd / Group 7	0	−3	2	
Hungary	3rd / Group 11	0	−5	2	
Republic of Ireland	3rd / Group 1	0	−5	1	
Slovenia	3rd / Group 8	0	−6	2	
Northern Ireland	3rd / Group 2	0	−6	2	
Armenia	3rd / Group 10	0	−8	0	
Kosovo	3rd / Group 12	0	−11	1	

Pot 3
Team	Pos. in group	Pts.	GD	GS	DP
Montenegro	4th / Group 9	3	−7	5	
Sweden	4th / Group 4	1	−4	4	
Latvia	4th / Group 12	1	−5	4	
Estonia	4th / Group 1	1	−9	3	
Luxembourg	4th / Group 10	1	−9	0	
Azerbaijan	4th / Group 2	1	−11	1	
Moldova	4th / Group 8	0	−4	2	

Pot 4
Team	Pos. in group	Pts.	GD	GS	DP
San Marino	4th / Group 11	0	−6	2	
Andorra	4th / Group 6	0	−11	1	
Gibraltar	4th / Group 7	0	−14	3	
Malta	4th / Group 5	0	−27	1	
Liechtenstein	4th / Group 3	0	−35	0	

== Goalscorers ==
In Round 1, there were 345 goals scored in 77 matches, for an average of 4.48 goals per match (as of 17 November 2026).

8 goals

- (Germany) Bastian Assomo

7 goals

- (Slovakia) Alan Lembakoali

5 goals

- (Norway) David Bakkane

4 goals

- (Denmark) Tobias Ekstrand
- (Finland) Kosmo Launiala
- (Netherlands) Orlando Holder
- (North Macedonia) Stefan Ristikj
- (Scotland) Lennon Watt
- (Switzerland) Nico Cavka
- (Turkey) Yigit Kabaktas

3 goals

- (Belgium) Jeoffrey Mbambi
- (Belgium) Adjani Bia Mujangi
- (Bosnia and Herzegovina) Haris Mušanović
- (Czech Republic) Lukáš Hanel
- (England) Mahdi Nicoll-Jazuli
- (France) Elies Oumar Mahlou Diallo
- (Iceland) Bjarki Hrafn Garðarsson
- (Israel) Tomer Dabah
- (Israel) Noam Goldenberg
- (Italy) Gabriele Borsa
- (Netherlands) Denzel Jeremiah Darko
- (Norway) Gabriel Rajkovic
- (Poland) Oliwier Madej
- (Republic of Ireland) Ciaran Daly
- (Slovakia) Denis Žofčák
- (Slovenia) Nino Križanič
- (Spain) Iker Aranda
- (Spain) Aitor Torondel
- (Switzerland) Eron Kele
- (Switzerland) Timothy Zanovello

2 goals

- (Albania) Rajan Dybeli
- (Albania) Haxhi Rrena
- (Belarus) Kiryl Salianik
- (Belarus) Tsimafei Tsimafeyeu
- (Belgium) Dwight Ede Eriyo
- (Belgium) Clever Ossohou
- (Bosnia and Herzegovina) Miloš Bajić
- (Bosnia and Herzegovina) Vedad Leto
- (Croatia) Marin Nekić
- (Czech Republic) Tomáš Dočekal
- (Czech Republic) Eric Pernica
- (Denmark) Johan Mortensen
- (England) Joshua Abe
- (England) Xavier Parker
- (Finland) Joel Ahen
- (France) Yanis Kharbouch
- (Germany) Milo Barde
- (Germany) Linus Güther
- (Greece) Alexandro Hinz
- (Israel) Noam Azrane
- (Israel) Ariel Dorra
- (Italy) Michele Elena
- (Kazakhstan) Roman Chernomorets
- (Kazakhstan) Anuar Tolendi
- (Kosovo) Arlind Thaqi
- (Lithuania) Rokas Melaikis
- (Moldova) Alexandr Girnet
- (Montenegro) Nikola Milačić
- (Montenegro) Danilo Vukčević
- (Netherlands) Adnane Ballari
- (Netherlands) Ilai Grootfaam
- (Northern Ireland) Michael Mulholland
- (Northern Ireland) Padai O'Kaine
- (Northern Ireland) Noah Vaugh
- (Poland) Adam Garwoliński
- (Portugal) Diego Farinha
- (Portugal) António Pereira
- (Romania) Victor Oniga
- (Scotland) Mason Stephens
- (Serbia) Pavle Ilić
- (Serbia) Filip Lazović
- (Serbia) Pavle Prijović
- (Sweden) Alexander Andersson
- (Switzerland) Kaan Arslan
- (Turkey) Esad Deniz
- (Turkey) Yusuf Sivaslioglu
- (Ukraine) Oleg Dzyurynets

1 goal

- (Albania) Gean Ramadani
- (Andorra) Marc Ber
- (Azerbaijan) Rasul Balakishiyev
- (Belarus) Uladzislau Tratsiak
- (Belgium) Jonah Billiet
- (Belgium) Jorel-Landry Fossi
- (Belgium) Mael Oppenbrouwer
- (Bosnia and Herzegovina) Emil Bujak
- (Bosnia and Herzegovina) Omar Huremović
- (Bosnia and Herzegovina) Adis Mehić
- (Bosnia and Herzegovina) Svetozar Milijević
- (Bosnia and Herzegovina) Jovan Trivunović
- (Bulgaria) Viktor Ivanov
- (Bulgaria) Kristiyan Mitrushev
- (Bulgaria) Nikolay Nedelchev
- (Bulgaria) Alexander Nikiforov
- (Bulgaria) Petar Petrov
- (Croatia) Lovro Benko
- (Croatia) Zvone Dacer
- (Croatia) Luka Kolar
- (Croatia) Dino Beader Trajanovski
- (Czech Republic) Jakub Nádeníček
- (Czech Republic) Adam Šafr
- (Czech Republic) Lukáš Soused
- (Denmark) Tristan Christensen
- (Denmark) Tristan Freiesleben
- (Denmark) Oskar Lauridsen
- (Denmark) Isak Mathiesen
- (Denmark) Tristan Thomsen
- (England) Mylo Bernard
- (England) Josh Blake
- (England) Emmanuel Fejokwu
- (England) Oscar Johnson
- (Estonia) Markus Kaalma
- (Estonia) Ivan Krasnov
- (Estonia) Denis Zotov
- (Finland) Nathan Aho
- (Finland) Ahmed Babiker
- (Finland) Otso Saikkonen
- (France) Yanis Bousserra
- (France) Jordan Gervelain
- (Georgia (country)) Andria Ochigava
- (Germany) Roko Ciglar
- (Germany) Shevin Matondo
- (Germany) Samuel Passariello
- (Gibraltar) Lucas Hill De Oliveira
- (Gibraltar) Liam Payas
- (Gibraltar) Matthew Sanchez
- (Greece) Panagiotis Fotis
- (Greece) Christos Kakalis
- (Greece) Georgios Tentolouris
- (Greece) Lucas Veridiano
- (Hungary) Botond Bazsika
- (Hungary) Timót Farkas
- (Hungary) Hunor Hajagos
- (Hungary) Áron Horváth
- (Hungary) Botond Szegedi
- (Iceland) Bjarki Örn Brynjarsson
- (Iceland) Sigurður Nói Jóhannsson
- (Iceland) Magnús Daði Ottesen
- (Iceland) Mikael Máni Þorfinnsson
- (Iceland) Óðinn Sturla Þórðarson
- (Israel) Yotam Kalfa
- (Israel) Jonathan Koriat
- (Israel) Liraz Yonatanov
- (Italy) Lorenzo Bernamonte
- (Italy) Fortune Egharevba
- (Italy) David Furlan
- (Italy) Giuseppe Pipito'
- (Italy) Roberto Scaglione
- (Italy) Cristian Sorrentino
- (Kazakhstan) Ibrakhim Asan
- (Kazakhstan) Salim Khasanov
- (Kazakhstan) Islam Rashidov
- (Kazakhstan) Ali Sadyrbayev
- (Kosovo) Aldrin Asani
- (Kosovo) Argjend Kosumi
- (Latvia) Andris Aizsilnieks
- (Latvia) Henrijs Holtoms
- (Latvia) Artūrs Jevdokimovs
- (Latvia) Miroslavs Mogiļevičs
- (Lithuania) Lukas Korvel
- (Lithuania) Eligijus Merliūnas
- (Lithuania) Justas Šluta
- (Malta) Lukas Wright
- (Montenegro) David Ivanović
- (Netherlands) Geraïn van Loon
- (Netherlands) Mees Rensen
- (Netherlands) Tijmen Vis
- (Norway) Ulrik Danbolt
- (Norway) Mathias Døvle-Lie
- (Norway) Eirik Granaas
- (Norway) Brage Haugen
- (Norway) Anders Fiskum Larsen
- (Norway) Mats Wehn Skjeldestad
- (Norway) Adrian Thomsen
- (Poland) Serafim Bakhno
- (Poland) Tymoteusz Leśniak
- (Poland) Franciszek Stępniewski
- (Portugal) Afonso Baldé
- (Portugal) Rafael Cabral
- (Portugal) Kauã Miranda
- (Republic of Ireland) Corey Fay
- (Republic of Ireland) Ronan Keating
- (Republic of Ireland) Jayden Marshall
- (Romania) David Avram
- (Romania) David Loghin
- (Romania) Stefan Nastac
- (San Marino) Samuel Mattei
- (San Marino) Francesco Mazza
- (Scotland) Coben Fergusson
- (Scotland) Corey Ngwenya
- (Scotland) Luca Rankin
- (Scotland) Ashton Scally
- (Serbia) Mihajlo Banković
- (Serbia) Miloš Ljuca
- (Slovakia) Mário Charamza
- (Slovakia) Patrik Sopko
- (Slovakia) Alex Šubert
- (Slovenia) Gal Jevšnik
- (Slovenia) Aron Vučić
- (Spain) Hugo Garcés
- (Spain) Kemen Mitxelena
- (Spain) Asier Sánchez
- (Spain) Joaquin Sanchez
- (Sweden) Felix Bjernvall
- (Sweden) Levi Hansas
- (Switzerland) Amri Dzaferi
- (Switzerland) Ryan Hare
- (Turkey) Metehan Eksiner
- (Turkey) Rıdvan Harman
- (Ukraine) Artem Rybak
- (Wales) Axel Donczew
- (Wales) Cynan Holdsworth
- (Wales) Leon Huxley
- (Wales) Lucas Roberts

1 own goal

- (Cyprus) Theodoros Panagi (against Romania)
- (Gibraltar) Aaron Cordon (against Iceland)
- (Hungary) Edvin Piróth (against Turkey)
- (Liechtenstein) Alexander Matheis (against Israel)
- (Liechtenstein) Leon Nobile (against Switzerland)
- (Norway) Benjamin Myrvold (against the Netherlands)
- (Serbia) Luka Vukoje (against Bulgaria)
