= Albania national under-17 football team =

Albania Under-17
- Nickname(s): Kuqezinjtë (The Red and Blacks); Shqiponjat (The Eagles)
- Association: Federata Shqiptare e Futbollit (FSHF)
- Confederation: UEFA
- Head coach: Armand Dama
- Captain: Gabriel Kulla
- Most caps: Adi Kurti (16)
- Top scorer: Gabriel Kulla (8)
- Home stadium: Elbasan Arena; Loro Boriçi Stadium
- FIFA code: ALB
First colours	Second colours	Third colours

First international
- Croatia 4–0 Albania (Vác, Hungary; 24 September 2001)

Biggest win
- Liechtenstein 0–6 Albania (Tatabánya, Hungary; 23 October 2012)

Biggest defeat
- Albania 0–7 Belarus (Riihimäki, Finland; 25 September 2008)

UEFA European Under-17 Championship
- Appearances: 1 (first in 2025)
- Best result: Group Stage (2025)

FIFA U-17 World Cup
- Appearances: 0
- Best result: –

The Albania national under-17 football team represents Albania in international football at this age level in the UEFA European Under-17 Championship, as well as any other under-17 international football tournaments. It is controlled by Albanian Football Association, the governing body for football in Albania.

Albania U17 has never qualified in an Under-17 major tournament, managing four times, their first Elite Round came in 2003 the "elite round" twice in 2012, 2014 under the coach Džemal Mustedanagić in both cases and nine years later in 2023. Despite not Qualifying in the past Albania U17 hosted the 2025 UEFA European Under-17 Championship, which was held in Tirana – capital city of the country.

== History ==
Before 2002, the event was classified as a U-16 tournament.

Champions Runners-up Third place Tournament played fully or partially on home soil

UEFA European Under-17 Championship record									UEFA European Under-17 Championship qualification record						Manager(s)
Year	Round	Position	Pld	W	D*	L	GF	GA	Pld	W	D	L	GF	GA	Manager(s)
(Denmark) 2002	did not qualify								3	0	0	3	4	11	Ilir Spahiu
(Portugal) 2003	did not qualify								6	2	2	2	8	7	Spahiu
(France) 2004	did not qualify								3	0	0	3	3	10	Spahiu
(Italy) 2005	did not qualify								3	1	0	2	8	7	Spahiu
(Luxembourg) 2006	did not qualify								3	0	0	3	1	10	Ramadan Shehu
(Belgium) 2007	did not qualify								3	0	1	2	2	7	Shpëtim Duro
(Turkey) 2008	did not qualify								3	0	1	2	1	10	Duro
(Germany) 2009	did not qualify								3	0	1	2	3	14	Ardian Mema
(Liechtenstein) 2010	did not qualify								3	0	0	3	2	11	Mema
(Serbia) 2011	did not qualify								3	0	1	2	1	5	Džemal Mustedanagić
(Slovenia) 2012	did not qualify								6	2	1	3	5	11	Mustedanagić
(Slovakia) 2013	did not qualify								3	1	0	2	2	6	Mustedanagić
(Malta) 2014	did not qualify								6	1	1	4	3	7	Mustedanagić
(Bulgaria) 2015	did not qualify								3	1	0	2	5	6	Mustedanagić
(Azerbaijan) 2016	did not qualify								3	0	1	2	1	8	Mustedanagić
(Croatia) 2017	did not qualify								3	0	0	3	1	5	Mustedanagić
(England) 2018	did not qualify								3	1	0	2	5	2	Mustedanagić
(Republic of Ireland) 2019	did not qualify								3	1	0	2	2	9	Mustedanagić
(Estonia) ~~2020~~	Tournament was cancelled								3	0	1	2	0	6	Elvin Beqiri
(Cyprus) ~~2021~~	Tournament was cancelled								Tournament was cancelled						Ervin Bulku
(Israel) 2022	did not qualify								3	0	1	2	4	10	Bulku
(Hungary) 2023	did not qualify								6	1	3	2	5	8	Bulku
(Cyprus) 2024	did not qualify								3	1	0	2	3	9	Ardian Behari
(Albania) 2025	Group	4th	3	0	0	3	0	12	5	2	1	2	6	8	Andrea Tedesco
(Estonia) 2026	did not qualify								5	0	2	3	4	12	Fatjon Tafaj
(Latvia) 2027	To be determined								3	1	1	1	4	4	Armand Dama
(Lithuania) 2028	To be determined								To be determined						
(Moldova) 2029	To be determined								To be determined						
Total			3	0	0	3	0	12	91	15	18	58	83	203	

*Denotes draws include knockout matches decided on penalty kicks.

== Recent results and fixtures ==
11 November 2025 2026 UEFA Q	Albania	1–1	Netherlands	Kotoriba
	Vata 52'	Report	Schaken 11'	Stadium: Sportski Park Kotoriba; Referee: Oguzhan Çakir (Türkiye)

14 November 2025 2026 UEFA Q	Croatia	3–0	Albania	Nedelišće
	Bartolović 10'; Miličić 26'; Frigan 35'	Report		Stadium: SRP Trate; Referee: Oscar Johnson (Sweden)

17 November 2025 2026 UEFA Q	Kazakhstan	2–1	Albania	Nedelišće
	Chernomorets 21'; Zhilkaidar 58'	Report	Muslika 90+5'	Stadium: SRP Trate; Referee: Ross Hardie (Scotland)

26 March 2026 Friendly	Albania	2–3	Latvia	Tirana
	Matjani 34'; Luka 90+6'	Report	Jirgensons 11'; Ščerbinskis 72'; Bombāns 86'	Stadium: Shtëpia e Futbollit

28 March 2026 Friendly	Albania	2–0	Latvia	Tirana
	Matjani 48'; Kiço 84'	Report		Stadium: Shtëpia e Futbollit

3 June 2026 2026 UEFA Q	Latvia	2–2	Albania	Rrogozhinë
	Baltrušaitis 2'; Blūms 88'	Report	Muslika 19' (pen.), 81'	Stadium: Egnatia Arena; Referee: Artem Gasparyan (Armenia)

9 June 2026 2026 UEFA Q	Albania	0–4	Ukraine	Rrogozhinë
		Report	Dziurynets 42'; Voloshko 57'; Pylypchuk 63'; Cappellato 83'	Stadium: Egnatia Arena; Referee: Karel Rouček (Czech Republic)

25 September 2026 Friendly	Montenegro	2–2	Albania	Tuz
	Laković 60'; Bulatović 90+4'	Report	Ivanović 16' (o.g.); Hyseni 28'	Stadium: Arena Besa

28 September 2026 Friendly	Albania	5–1	Montenegro	Shkodër
	Sharka 20'; Ajvazi 47' (pen.); Sina 52'; Muji 76'; Rrena 85'	Report	Bajraktarović 87'	Stadium: Loro Boriçi Stadium

11 November 2026 2027 UEFA Q	Sweden	0–0	Albania	Elbasan
		Report		Stadium: Elbasan Arena; Referee: Andreu Simarro (Andorra)

14 November 2026 2027 UEFA Q	Scotland	1–3	Albania	Elbasan
	Ngwenya 8'	Report	Ramadani 60'; Dybeli 72', 90+4'	Stadium: Elbasan Arena; Referee: Andreu Simarro (Andorra)

17 November 2026 2027 UEFA Q	Albania	1–3	Finland	Elbasan
	Rrena 85'	Report	Launiala 61' (pen.), 64'; Aho 90+7'	Stadium: Elbasan Arena; Referee: Aaron O’Dowd (Ireland)

== Players ==
=== Current squad ===
The following players will be called up for the 2027 Euro qualifying matches against Sweden, Scotland, and Finland on 11, 14, and 17 November 2026.

Caps and goals correct as of 17 November 2026, after the match against Finland.

No.	Pos.	Player	Date of birth (age)	Caps	Goals	Club
	GK	Marsid Hoxha	13 March 2010 (age 16)	3	0	(Albanian Football Federation) Tirana U17
	GK	Rei Shpuza	5 April 2010 (age 16)	1	0	(Albanian Football Federation) Vllaznia U17
	DF	Jon Ajvazi	13 March 2010 (age 16)	5	1	(Swiss Football Association) Basel U17
	DF	Rian Nezaj	14 November 2010 (age 16)	5	0	(Albanian Football Federation) Vora U17
	DF	Aend Çekrezi	29 November 2010 (age 15)	4	0	(Albanian Football Federation) Vora U17
	DF	Mito Filaj	22 September 2010 (age 16)	3	0	(Hellenic Football Federation) OFI U17
	DF	Rejan Caslli	30 July 2010 (age 16)	2	0	(Albanian Football Federation) Partizani U19
	DF	Denian Avdylaj	25 January 2011 (age 15)	1	0	(Albanian Football Federation) Elite Youth Academy
	MF	Tom Keqi	29 May 2010 (age 16)	5	0	(Italian Football Federation) Inter U17
	MF	Angelos Çomo	6 March 2010 (age 16)	5	0	(Hellenic Football Federation) Panathinaikos U17
	MF	Eldin Veliu	23 August 2010 (age 16)	5	0	(Swiss Football Association) Basel U17
	MF	Rajan Dybeli	24 July 2010 (age 16)	3	2	(Albanian Football Federation) Vora U17
	MF	Gean Ramadani	8 June 2011 (age 15)	2	1	(Albanian Football Federation) Elite Youth Academy
	MF	Kleo Llapushi	15 May 2010 (age 16)	1	0	(Hellenic Football Federation) Ermionida
	FW	Haxhi Rrena	18 January 2010 (age 16)	5	2	(Albanian Football Federation) Besa
	FW	Fabio Hyseni	26 April 2010 (age 16)	5	1	(Albanian Football Federation) Partizani B
	FW	Lorent Zhara	14 October 2010 (age 16)	5	0	(Swedish Football Association) Häcken U17
	FW	Gentjan Sharka	2 February 2010 (age 16)	4	1	(Italian Football Federation) Fiorentina U17
	FW	Mattia Xhemali	18 February 2010 (age 16)	3	0	(Italian Football Federation) Roma U17
	FW	Anel Aliaj	24 May 2010 (age 16)	2	0	(Royal Spanish Football Federation) Villarreal U17

=== Recent call-ups ===
The following players have been recently called up and are still eligible to represent the under-17 side:

Pos.	Player	Date of birth (age)	Caps	Goals	Club	Latest call-up
GK	Bleron Çeliku	25 January 2010 (age 16)	2	0	(France) Marseille U17	v. Sweden, 11 November 2026^{INJ}
GK	Simon Lleshi	27 April 2009 (age 17)	8	0	(Italy) Inter U20	v. Ukraine, 9 June 2026^{U19}
GK	Bjorni Betoja	22 May 2009 (age 17)	0	0	(Albania) Vora U19	v. Latvia, 28 March 2026
GK	Klejton Uruci	21 November 2009 (age 16)	6	0	(Italy) Bologna U18	v. Kazakhstan, 17 November 2025
DF	Drion Ibrahimi	26 July 2010 (age 16)	2	0	(Germany) 1860 München U17	v. Montenegro, 28 September 2026
DF	Albion Muji	3 May 2010 (age 16)	1	1	(Italy) Caratese U17	v. Montenegro, 28 September 2026
DF	Denis Nikolli	15 February 2010 (age 16)	0	0	(Italy) Como U17	v. Montenegro, 28 September 2026
DF	Frensi Mali	29 April 2009 (age 17)	13	0	(Albania) Partizani U19	v. Ukraine, 9 June 2026
DF	Emiljano Malko	2 February 2009 (age 17)	7	0	(Germany) Duisburg U19	v. Ukraine, 9 June 2026
DF	Afrim Gashi	11 January 2009 (age 17)	5	0	(Germany) Bayern U19	v. Ukraine, 9 June 2026^{U19}
DF	Robin Balla	20 May 2009 (age 17)	5	0	(Albania) Partizani U19	v. Ukraine, 9 June 2026
DF	Jonas Nushi	23 February 2009 (age 17)	4	0	(Switzerland) St. Gallen U17	v. Ukraine, 9 June 2026
DF	Sebastian Amataj	27 February 2009 (age 17)	4	0	(England) Bromley U18	v. Ukraine, 9 June 2026
DF	Jason Bori	16 February 2009 (age 17)	2	0	(United States) NY Red Bulls II	v. Ukraine, 9 June 2026
DF	Konstantinos Varesi	2 January 2009 (age 17)	11	0	(Italy) Monza U20	v. Latvia, 28 March 2026
DF	Dennis Pierro	11 March 2009 (age 17)	9	0	(Italy) Torino U18	v. Latvia, 28 March 2026
DF	Glenne Lushakaj	9 October 2009 (age 17)	1	0	(Germany) Havelse U19	v. Latvia, 28 March 2026
DF	Xhoel Mezani	5 July 2009 (age 17)	9	0	(Albania) Oriku	v. Kazakhstan, 17 November 2025
DF	Enea Bilishti	8 February 2009 (age 17)	4	0	(Italy) Union Brescia U19	v. Kazakhstan, 17 November 2025
DF	Simon Uldedaj	6 February 2009 (age 17)	3	0	(Albania) Vllaznia B	v. Kazakhstan, 17 November 2025
DF	Kejdi Kaceli	29 March 2009 (age 17)	0	0	(Albania) Skënderbeu U19	v. Kazakhstan, 17 November 2025
MF	Sebastian Sina	2 August 2010 (age 16)	2	1	(Italy) Atalanta U17	v. Montenegro, 28 September 2026^{INJ}
MF	Heldi Kopliku	10 March 2010 (age 16)	1	0	(Albania) Vllaznia U17	v. Montenegro, 28 September 2026
MF	Roan Laze	16 July 2010 (age 16)	1	0	(Albania) Egnatia U17	v. Montenegro, 28 September 2026
MF	Dion Vata	25 February 2009 (age 17)	13	2	(Albania) Partizani	v. Ukraine, 9 June 2026^{U19}
MF	Petro Marku	15 August 2009 (age 17)	11	0	(Albania) Bylisi	v. Ukraine, 9 June 2026
MF	Armend Muslika	8 March 2009 (age 17)	8	3	(England) Tottenham Hotspur U18	v. Ukraine, 9 June 2026^{U19}
MF	Mattias Allasufi	11 January 2009 (age 17)	8	1	(Italy) Pro Patria	v. Ukraine, 9 June 2026
MF	Alvin Zekaj	16 May 2009 (age 17)	3	0	(Italy) Roma U18	v. Ukraine, 9 June 2026
MF	Daniele Lulaj	18 April 2009 (age 17)	6	0	(Italy) Lazio U18	v. Latvia, 28 March 2026
MF	Matias Zogu	12 January 2009 (age 17)	2	0	(Greece) Asteras AKTOR U19	v. Latvia, 28 March 2026
MF	Kledi Qosja	14 August 2009 (age 17)	8	0	(Italy) Catanzaro U19	v. Kazakhstan, 17 November 2025
FW	Klevis Basha	16 February 2010 (age 16)	2	0	(Italy) Genoa U17	v. Montenegro, 28 September 2026
FW	Sebastian Gjeka	3 June 2010 (age 16)	0	0	(Albania) Vllaznia U17	v. Montenegro, 28 September 2026
FW	Majkol Luka	23 March 2009 (age 17)	11	2	(Italy) Fiorentina U18	v. Ukraine, 9 June 2026
FW	Elson Himallari	16 April 2009 (age 17)	10	1	(Albania) Partizani	v. Ukraine, 9 June 2026^{U19}
FW	Sokol Uldedaj	6 February 2009 (age 17)	10	0	(Albania) Vllaznia	v. Ukraine, 9 June 2026
FW	Alvin Mahmutaj	20 June 2009 (age 17)	5	0	(Albania) Apolonia	v. Ukraine, 9 June 2026
FW	Francesco Matjani	5 June 2009 (age 17)	4	2	(Germany) Union Berlin U19	v. Ukraine, 9 June 2026^{U19}
FW	Françesko Kiço	3 December 2009 (age 16)	4	1	(Portugal) Gondomar U17	v. Ukraine, 9 June 2026
FW	Ermal Ymeri	17 May 2009 (age 17)	11	0	(Sweden) Brommapojkarna U17	v. Latvia, 28 March 2026
FW	Delis Gjeci	27 February 2009 (age 17)	2	0	(Italy) Inter U20	v. Latvia, 28 March 2026

Notes

- ^{INJ} = The player is not part of the current squad due to injury.
- ^{U19} = Was called up from national under-19 squad.

=== Coaching staff ===
Current coaching staff:

Position	Name
Head Coach	(Albania) Armand Dama
Assistant Coach	(Albania) Fatjon Muhameti
Goalkeeping Coach	(Albania) Florian Ristani
Team doctor	(Albania) Theodhor Mile
Physiotherapists	(Albania) Roxhens Tomorri
Athletic preparator	(Albania) Lorin Xhaferaj
Videoanalystic	(Albania) Luis Hysaj
Team manager	(Albania) David Grudaj

== See also ==
- Albania national football team
- Albania national under-23 football team
- Albania national under-21 football team
- Albania national under-20 football team
- Albania national under-19 football team
- Albania national under-18 football team
- Albania national under-16 football team
- Albania national under-15 football team
- Albania national football team results
- Albania national youth football team
- Albanian Superliga
- Football in Albania
- List of Albania international footballers
- UEFA European Under-17 Football Championship
