= Bosnia and Herzegovina national under-17 football team =

Bosnia and Herzegovina
- Nickname(s): Zmajevi (Dragons); Zlatni Ljiljani (Golden Lilies)
- Association: Football Association of Bosnia and Herzegovina
- Confederation: UEFA (Europe)
- Head coach: Asmir Avdukić
- Most caps: Rijad Sadiku (28)
- Top scorer: Amer Gojak (9)
- FIFA code: BIH
First colours	Second colours

First international
- Finland 0–1 Bosnia and Herzegovina (Sarajevo, Bosnia and Herzegovina; 1 October 2007)

Biggest win
- Bosnia and Herzegovina 8–0 Gibraltar (Zenica, Bosnia and Herzegovina; 10 October 2018); Gibraltar 1–9 Bosnia and Herzegovina; (Sept. 29, 2026)

Biggest defeat
- Bosnia and Herzegovina 0–6 Belgium (Bijeljina, Bosnia and Herzegovina; 29 March 2022)

European Championship
- Appearances: 3 (first in 2016)
- Best result: Group Stage, (2016, 2017, 2018)

The Bosnia and Herzegovina national under-17 football team is made up by players who are 17 years old or younger and represents Bosnia and Herzegovina in international football matches at this age level. It is controlled by the Football Association of Bosnia and Herzegovina.

== Competitive record ==
=== UEFA European Under-17 Championship record ===
UEFA European Under-16/17 Championship record									Qualification record						
Year	Round	Pld	W	D*	L	GF	GA	GD	Pld	W	D*	L	GF	GA	GD
(Denmark) 2002	Did not qualify								2	0	1	1	0	2	−2
(Portugal) 2003	Did not qualify								3	0	0	3	0	4	−2
(France) 2004	Did not qualify								3	1	0	2	6	8	−2
(Italy) 2005	Did not qualify								3	0	2	1	2	4	−2
(Luxembourg) 2006	Did not qualify								3	0	1	2	4	8	−4
(Belgium) 2007	Did not qualify								6	2	0	4	5	11	−7
(Turkey) 2008	Did not qualify								6	3	1	2	5	6	−1
(Germany) 2009	Did not qualify								3	0	0	3	1	4	−3
(Liechtenstein) 2010	Did not qualify								6	0	5	1	8	9	−1
(Serbia) 2011	Did not qualify								3	1	0	2	5	10	−5
(Slovenia) 2012	Did not qualify								3	1	0	2	1	5	−4
(Slovakia) 2013	Did not qualify								3	1	0	2	3	5	−2
(Malta) 2014	Did not qualify								6	3	1	2	6	4	+2
(Bulgaria) 2015	Did not qualify								6	2	2	2	7	10	−3
(Azerbaijan) 2016	Group stage	3	1	0	2	3	6	-3	6	4	0	2	11	7	+4
(Croatia) 2017	Group stage	3	1	0	2	2	7	-5	6	3	1	2	7	4	+3
(England) 2018	Group stage	3	1	0	2	3	8	-5	6	3	2	1	9	5	+4
(Republic of Ireland) 2019	Did not qualify								6	1	1	4	11	4	+7
(Estonia) ~~2020~~	Cancelled								3	1	0	2	5	6	−3
(Cyprus) ~~2021~~	Cancelled								0	0	0	0	0	0	0
(Israel) 2022	Did not qualify								6	2	1	3	10	14	−4
(Hungary) 2023	Did not qualify								6	3	2	1	7	8	−1
(Cyprus) 2024	Did not qualify								6	2	1	3	9	11	-2
(Albania) 2025	Did not qualify								6	4	1	1	20	7	+13
(Estonia) 2026	Did not qualify								6	1	2	3	9	9	0
Total	3/20	9	3	0	6	8	21	−13	113	38	24	51	151	165	−14

*Denotes draws include knockout matches decided on penalty kicks.

List of UEFA U17 European Championship matches
Year	Round	Score	Result	Bosnia goalscorers
2016	Group stage	Bosnia and Herzegovina 0–2 Austria	Loss	
2016	Group stage	Bosnia and Herzegovina 1–3 Germany	Loss	Baack (o.g.)
2016	Group stage	Bosnia and Herzegovina 2–1 Ukraine	Win	B. Hadžić (2)
2017	Group stage	Bosnia and Herzegovina 0–5 Germany	Loss	
2017	Group stage	Bosnia and Herzegovina 1–2 Republic of Ireland	Loss	Vještica
2017	Group stage	Bosnia and Herzegovina 1–0 Serbia	Win	Imamović
2018	Group stage	Bosnia and Herzegovina 3-2 Denmark	Win	Memišević (2)
2018	Group stage	Bosnia and Herzegovina 0-4 Belgium	Loss	
2018	Group stage	Bosnia and Herzegovina 0–2 Republic of Ireland	Loss	

== 2027 UEFA European Under-17 Championship qualification ==
=== Group 7 ===
Pos	Team	Pld	W	D	L	GF	GA	GD	Pts	Qualification
1	Iceland	3	3	0	0	10	3	+7	9	Round 2 League A
2	Bosnia and Herzegovina (H)	3	2	0	1	12	4	+8	6	Round 2 League A
3	Greece	3	1	0	2	6	7	−1	3	Round 2 League B
4	Gibraltar	3	0	0	3	3	17	−14	0	Round 2 League B

Source: UEFA
Rules for classification: Tiebreakers
(H) Hosts

23 September 2026	Bosnia and Herzegovina	2–0	Greece	Mladost Stadium, Kakanj
14:00	Leto 65'; Mehić 88'	Report		Referee: Dalibor Černý (Czech Republic)

26 September 2026	Iceland	3–1	Bosnia and Herzegovina	FF BH Football Training Centre, Zenica
14:00	Garðarsson 28', 72'; Þórðarson 87'	Report	Mušanović 17'	Referee: Wojciech Myc (Poland)

29 September 2026	Gibraltar	1–9	Bosnia and Herzegovina	FF BH Football Training Centre, Zenica
14:00	Sanchez 62'	Report	Milijević 16'; Mušanović 26', 56'; Trivunović 34'; Leto 58'; Bujak 65'; Huremović 75'; Bajić 79', 86'	Referee: Gal Levi (Israel)

== Personnel ==
=== Current technical staff ===
Position	Name
Head coach	(Bosnia and Herzegovina) Asmir Avdukić
Coach	(Bosnia and Herzegovina) Denis Malešević
Coach	(Bosnia and Herzegovina) Amir Spahić
Goalkeeping coach	(Bosnia and Herzegovina) Nenad Džidić

=== Coaching history ===
Dates	Name
2025–present	(Bosnia and Herzegovina) Asmir Avdukić
2024–2025	(Bosnia and Herzegovina) Muhamed Džakmić
2023–2024	(Bosnia and Herzegovina) Admir Raščić
2022	(Bosnia and Herzegovina) Nedim Jusufbegović
2019–2022	(Bosnia and Herzegovina) Nermin Šabić
2019	(Bosnia and Herzegovina) Adin Mulaosmanović (caretaker)
2011–2018	(Bosnia and Herzegovina) Sakib Malkočević
2002–2011	(Bosnia and Herzegovina) Velimir Stojnić
1995–1996	(Bosnia and Herzegovina) Dino Đurbuzović

== Current squad ==
The following players were called up for 2027 UEFA European Under-17 Championship qualification matches against Greece, Iceland and Gibraltar on 23, 26 and 29 September 2026; respectively.

No.	Pos.	Player	Date of birth (age)	Club
	GK	Benjamin Dautović	17 July 2010 (age 16)	(Swiss Football Association) Basel
	GK	Issa Ilyas Đapo	17 February 2010 (age 16)	(German Football Association) St. Pauli
	GK	Amar Omerović	13 July 2010 (age 16)	(German Football Association) Bayern Munich
	DF	Emil Bujak	26 March 2010 (age 16)	(Football Association of Bosnia and Herzegovina) Željezničar Sarajevo
	DF	Josip Čolak	2 July 2010 (age 16)	(Football Association of Bosnia and Herzegovina) Široki Brijeg
	DF	Marko Karačić	18 April 2010 (age 16)	(Football Association of Bosnia and Herzegovina) Zrinjski Mostar
	DF	Adis Mehić	27 April 2010 (age 16)	(German Football Association) Werder Bremen
	DF	Svetozar Miljević	28 January 2010 (age 16)	(Football Association of Bosnia and Herzegovina) Borac Banja Luka
	DF	Vedad Mujkić	28 March 2010 (age 16)	(Football Association of Bosnia and Herzegovina) Čelik Zenica
	DF	Ivan Vasiljević	29 March 2010 (age 16)	(Football Association of Bosnia and Herzegovina) Borac Banja Luka
	DF	Inel Zatega	26 January 2010 (age 16)	(Football Association of Bosnia and Herzegovina) Velež Mostar
	MF	Sanel Delić	12 April 2010 (age 16)	(Football Association of Bosnia and Herzegovina) Radnik Bijeljina
	MF	Hamza Hodžić	24 March 2010 (age 16)	(Football Association of Bosnia and Herzegovina) Sarajevo
	MF	Vedad Leto	11 September 2010 (age 16)	(Football Association of Bosnia and Herzegovina) Sarajevo
	MF	Tarik Mujić	27 March 2010 (age 16)	(German Football Association) Bayern Munich
	MF	Haris Mušanović	10 May 2010 (age 16)	(German Football Association) Eintracht Frankfurt
	FW	Ahmed Avdičević	27 March 2010 (age 16)	(Football Association of Bosnia and Herzegovina) Sarajevo
	FW	Miloš Bajić	5 August 2009 (age 17)	(Football Association of Bosnia and Herzegovina) Borac Banja Luka
	FW	Omar Huremović	20 April 2010 (age 16)	(Football Association of Bosnia and Herzegovina) Sarajevo
	FW	Enis Kičin	26 May 2009 (age 17)	(Football Association of Bosnia and Herzegovina) Zrinjski Mostar
	FW	Andrej Kovač	14 June 2010 (age 16)	(Football Association of Bosnia and Herzegovina) Posušje
	FW	Amel Musić	9 July 2010 (age 16)	(Austrian Football Association) SKN St. Pölten
	FW	Jovan Trivunović	27 January 2010 (age 16)	(Football Association of Bosnia and Herzegovina) Borac Banja Luka

== See also ==
- UEFA European Under-17 Championship
- Bosnia and Herzegovina men's national football team
- Bosnia and Herzegovina national under-21 football team
- Bosnia and Herzegovina national under-19 football team
- Bosnia and Herzegovina national under-18 football team
- Bosnia and Herzegovina national under-15 football team
- Bosnia and Herzegovina women's national football team
- Bosnia and Herzegovina women's national under-19 football team
- Bosnia and Herzegovina women's national under-17 football team
