= Northern Ireland national under-17 football team =

National under-17 association football team representing Northern Ireland

Northern Ireland Under-17
- Nickname(s): The GAWA; Norn Iron
- Association: Irish Football Association
- Confederation: UEFA (Europe)
- Head coach: Andy Waterworth
- Home stadium: various
- FIFA code: NIR
First colours	Second colours

First international
- Northern Ireland 0–3 Austria (Ballymena, Northern Ireland; 18 September 2001)

Biggest win
- Northern Ireland 7–0 Luxembourg (Beggen, Luxembourg; 30 October 2019

Biggest defeat
- Northern Ireland 0–8 Turkey (Staines, England; 2 September 2007

World Cup
- Appearances: 0

European Championship
- Appearances: 6 (first in 1987)
- Best result: Group stage (6 times)

The Northern Ireland national under-17 football team also known as Northern Ireland under-17s or Northern Ireland U17s represents Northern Ireland in association football at under-17 level. It is controlled by the Irish Football Association. The team first competed as Northern Ireland under-16 before evolving into the current under-17 side when UEFA realigned their youth tournaments in 2001. They have qualified for the finals of the UEFA European Under-16 Championships five times (1987, 1990, 1992, 1993 and 1997) and for the UEFA European Under-17 Football Championship once (2004). In addition to the UEFA Championships, the team also plays regular friendlies and in minor tournaments from similar age-group teams from throughout the world.

== Competitive record ==
=== UEFA U-16/17 European Championship record ===
UEFA European Under-16/17 Championship Finals record									Qualification record						
Year	Round	Pld	W	D	L	GF	GA	GD	Pld	W	D	L	GF	GA	GD
(Italy) 1982	did not enter								did not enter						
(West Germany) 1984	did not enter								did not enter						
(Hungary) 1985	did not enter								did not enter						
(Greece) 1986	did not qualify								2	0	1	1	0	1	–1
(France) 1987	Group stage	3	0	2	1	2	3	–1	2	1	0	1	1	1	0
(Spain) 1988	did not qualify								2	0	1	1	0	2	–2
(Denmark) 1989	did not qualify								2	0	1	1	1	3	–2
(East Germany) 1990	Group stage	3	1	0	2	3	8	–5	2	1	1	0	4	3	+1
(Switzerland) 1991	did not qualify								2	0	0	2	0	4	–4
(Cyprus) 1992	Group stage	3	0	1	2	2	6	–4	2	1	0	1	3	3	0
(Turkey) 1993	Group stage	3	0	1	2	3	8	–5	2	1	0	1	1	1	0
(Republic of Ireland) 1994	did not qualify								2	1	0	1	4	5	–1
(Belgium) 1995	did not qualify								2	1	0	1	1	4	–3
(Austria) 1996	did not qualify								2	0	0	2	2	4	–2
(Germany) 1997	Group stage	3	1	0	2	3	4	–1	2	2	0	0	8	2	+6
(Scotland) 1998	did not qualify								2	1	1	0	1	0	+1
(Czech Republic) 1999	did not qualify								4	1	1	2	2	4	–2
(Israel) 2000	did not qualify								2	0	1	1	0	2	–2
(England) 2001	did not qualify								2	0	1	1	1	3	–2
(Denmark) 2002	did not qualify								4	0	0	4	4	11	–7
(Portugal) 2003	did not qualify								6	3	1	2	4	4	0
(France) 2004	Group stage	3	0	0	3	3	12	–9	6	4	1	1	13	9	+4
(Italy) 2005	did not qualify								6	2	1	3	11	12	–1
(Luxembourg) 2006	did not qualify								6	3	0	3	9	13	–4
(Belgium) 2007	did not qualify								6	3	1	2	9	7	+2
(Turkey) 2008	did not qualify								6	3	0	3	7	8	–1
(Germany) 2009	did not qualify								3	1	0	2	1	3	–2
(Liechtenstein) 2010	did not qualify								6	4	0	2	6	5	+1
(Serbia) 2011	did not qualify								6	2	1	3	12	12	0
(Slovenia) 2012	did not qualify								3	1	0	2	2	5	–3
(Slovakia) 2013	did not qualify								6	1	3	2	10	8	+2
(Malta) 2014	did not qualify								3	1	0	2	3	4	–1
(Bulgaria) 2015	did not qualify								6	1	2	3	7	15	–8
(Azerbaijan) 2016	did not qualify								3	0	1	2	2	4	–2
(Croatia) 2017	did not qualify								3	1	0	2	5	9	–4
(England) 2018	did not qualify								3	1	0	2	1	8	–7
(Republic of Ireland) 2019	did not qualify								6	1	2	3	7	9	–2
(Estonia) 2020	Cancelled due to COVID-19 pandemic								3	1	0	2	7	6	+1
(Cyprus) 2021	Cancelled due to COVID-19 pandemic								Cancelled due to COVID-19 pandemic						
(Israel) 2022	did not qualify								3	0	1	2	4	7	–3
(Hungary) 2023	did not qualify								6	1	1	4	5	13	–8
(Cyprus) 2024	did not qualify								6	2	1	3	10	13	–3
(Albania) 2025	did not qualify								6	2	1	3	8	12	–4
(Estonia) 2026	did not qualify								6	1	2	3	4	10	-6
(Latvia) 2027	to be determined														
(Lithuania) 2028	to be determined														
(Moldova) 2029	to be determined														
Total	Group stage	18	2	4	12	16	41	–25	152	49	27	46	180	249	–69

=== FIFA Under-17 World Cup ===
Year	Round	Pld	W	D	L	GF	GA	GD
(China) 1985	did not enter							
(Canada) 1987	did not qualify							
(Scotland) 1989	did not qualify							
(Italy) 1991	did not qualify							
(Japan) 1993	did not qualify							
(Ecuador) 1995	did not qualify							
(Egypt) 1997	did not qualify							
(New Zealand) 1999	did not qualify							
(Trinidad and Tobago) 2001	did not qualify							
(Finland) 2003	did not qualify							
(Peru) 2005	did not qualify							
(South Korea) 2007	did not qualify							
(Nigeria) 2009	did not qualify							
(Mexico) 2011	did not qualify							
(United Arab Emirates) 2013	did not qualify							
(Chile) 2015	did not qualify							
(India) 2017	did not qualify							
(Brazil) 2019	did not qualify							
(Indonesia) 2023	did not qualify							
(Qatar) 2025	did not qualify							
(Qatar) 2026	did not qualify							
(Qatar) 2027	TBD							
(Qatar) 2028	TBD							
(Qatar) 2029	TBD							

== Current Coaching Staff ==
Position	Name
Manager	(Northern Ireland) Andy Waterworth
Assistant Manager	
Coach	
Goalkeeping Coach	(Northern Ireland) Roy Carroll

== Players ==
=== Current squad ===
Players born on or after 1 January 2009 will be eligible until the end of the 2026 UEFA European Under-17 Championship.

Names in bold denote players who have been capped by Northern Ireland in a higher age group.

The following players were named in the squad for the Under-17 Euro 2026 elite round games against Spain, Turkiye and Scotland on 15 March, 18 March and 21 March 2026 respectively.

No.	Pos.	Player	Date of birth (age)	Club
	GK	Phoenix Blayney	17 November 2010 (age 15)	(Irish Football Association) Larne
	GK	Kyle Chivers		(Irish Football Association) Ballymena United
	DF	Calum Anderson	9 January 2009 (age 17)	(The Football Association) Southampton
	DF	Alfie Wilson	14 March 2009 (age 17)	(Scottish Football Association) Hearts
	DF	Paul Stanfield	17 March 2009 (age 17)	(Irish Football Association) Cliftonville
	DF	Shea McGarry	18 August 2009 (age 17)	(Irish Football Association) Cliftonville
	DF	Sonny Trainor	4 November 2009 (age 17)	(Irish Football Association) Larne
	DF	Daniel McCarron	2 February 2010 (age 16)	(Irish Football Association) Dungannon Swifts
	DF	Alfie Mulvenna	5 March 2010 (age 16)	(Irish Football Association) Larne
	DF	David Green		(Irish Football Association) Cliftonville
	MF	Finlay Ross	16 February 2009 (age 17)	(Irish Football Association) Linfield
	MF	Charlie McConnell	2 July 2009 (age 17)	(Football Association of Ireland) UCD
	MF	Liam Kelly	7 August 2010 (age 16)	(Football Association of Ireland) Derry City
	MF	Alfie Anderson		(Irish Football Association) Cliftonville
	FW	Jack May	15 January 2009 (age 17)	(Irish Football Association) Larne
	FW	Joel Kerr	24 March 2009 (age 17)	(The Football Association) West Ham United
	FW	Luke Hawe	30 April 2009 (age 17)	(The Football Association) Southampton
	FW	Zak Magowan	8 July 2009 (age 17)	(Irish Football Association) Glentoran
	FW	Eamonn Tohill	13 September 2009 (age 17)	(Irish Football Association) Cliftonville
	FW	Michael Mulholland	17 January 2011 (age 15)	(Irish Football Association) Crusaders

=== Recent call-ups ===
The following players have previously been called up to the Northern Ireland under-17 squad and remain eligible.

No.	Pos.	Player	Date of birth (age)	Club
	GK	Matthew Belshaw	5 July 2010 (age 16)	(Irish Football Association) Glentoran
	GK	Tom Hill		(The Football Association) Shrewsbury Town
	DF	Charlie Campbell	19 October 2009 (age 17)	(Irish Football Association) Linfield
	DF	Calum Woods		(Football Association of Ireland) Dundalk
	DF	Sean Cassidy		(Irish Football Association) Cliftonville
	MF	Coran Madden	5 February 2009 (age 17)	(The Football Association) Brentford
	MF	Jake Drewett	18 March 2009 (age 17)	(The Football Association) Bournemouth
	MF	Emmett Morrison	23 March 2009 (age 17)	(The Football Association) Sheffield United
	MF	Mason Ayre	5 January 2010 (age 16)	(Irish Football Association) Glentoran
	MF	Conor Wilson	23 February 2010 (age 16)	(Irish Football Association) Coleraine
	MF	Adam Nelson	2 March 2010 (age 16)	(Irish Football Association) Glentoran
	MF	Freddie Murdock		(The Football Association) Everton
	MF	Harry Gough		(Irish Football Association) Glenavon
	MF	Will Haselhurst		(The Football Association) Middlesbrough
	FW	Jahmi Kellyman	6 July 2009 (age 17)	(The Football Association) Aston Villa

== See also ==
- Northern Ireland national football team
- Northern Ireland national under-21 football team
- Northern Ireland national under-19 football team
