= Iceland men's national under-17 football team =

Iceland U-17
- Nickname: Strákarnir okkar
- Association: Knattspyrnusamband Íslands
- Confederation: UEFA (Europe)
- Head coach: Þorlákur Árnason
- FIFA code: ISL
First colours	Second colours

First international
- Iceland 1–3 Scotland (Kópavogur, Iceland; 21 March 1981)

Biggest win
- Iceland 6–0 Wales (Selfoss, Iceland; 24 September 1990); Iceland 6–0 Andorra (Andorra la Vella, Andorra; 23 September 2005)

Biggest defeat
- Sweden 5–0 Iceland (Mariestad, Sweden; 17 October 1987)

UEFA European Under-17 Championship
- Appearances: 9 (first in 1985)
- Best result: Group Stage

The Iceland men's national under-17 football team represents Iceland in international football at this age level and is controlled by Knattspyrnusamband Íslands (KSÍ), the governing body for football in Iceland.

== History in the UEFA European Under-17 Championship ==
Between 1982-2001 this was an under-16 championship.

Year	Result	GP	W	D	L	GS	GA	GD
(Italy) 1982	Qualifying stage							
(West Germany) 1984	Qualifying stage							
(Hungary) 1985	16th	3	0	0	3	0	10	-10
(Greece) 1986	Qualifying stage							
(France) 1987	Qualifying stage							
(Spain) 1988	Qualifying stage							
(Denmark) 1989	Qualifying stage							
(East Germany) 1990	Qualifying stage							
(Switzerland) 1991	11th	3	1	0	2	3	5	-2
(Cyprus) 1992	Qualifying stage							
(Turkey) 1993	11th	3	1	0	2	6	5	+1
(Republic of Ireland) 1994	15th	3	0	0	3	3	6	-3
(Belgium) 1995	Qualifying stage							
(Austria) 1996	Qualifying stage							
(Germany) 1997	11th	3	1	0	2	2	5	-3
(Scotland) 1998	15th	3	0	1	2	1	4	-3
(Czech Republic) 1999	Qualifying stage							
(Israel) 2000	Qualifying stage							
(England) 2001	Qualifying stage							
(Denmark) 2002	Qualifying stage							
(Portugal) 2003	First qualifying stage							
(France) 2004	Second qualifying stage							
(Italy) 2005	First qualifying stage							
(Luxembourg) 2006	First qualifying stage							
(Belgium) 2007	8th	3	0	0	3	1	10	-9
(Turkey) 2008	First qualifying stage							
(Germany) 2009	First qualifying stage							
(Liechtenstein) 2010	First qualifying stage							
(Serbia) 2011	Elite round							
(Slovenia) 2012	7th	3	0	1	2	2	4	-2
(Slovakia) 2013	First qualifying stage							
(Malta) 2014	Elite round							
(Bulgaria) 2015	Elite round							
(Azerbaijan) 2016	Elite round							
(Croatia) 2017	First qualifying stage							
(England) 2018	Elite round							
(Republic of Ireland) 2019	12th	3	1	0	2	6	8	-2
(Estonia) 2020	Initially postponed and then cancelled due to the COVID-19 pandemic in Europe.							
(Cyprus) 2021	Cancelled due to the COVID-19 pandemic in Europe.							
(Israel) 2022	First qualifying stage							
(Hungary) 2023	Elite round							
(Cyprus) 2024	First qualifying stage							
(Albania) 2025	Second qualifying stage							
(Estonia) 2026	Second qualifying stage							
(Latvia) 2027	To be determined							
(Lithuania) 2028	To be determined							
(Moldova) 2029	To be determined							
Total	9/40	27	4	2	21	24	57	-33

== Players ==
=== Current squad ===
The following players were called up for the most recent 2026 UEFA European Under-17 Championship qualification matches.

No.	Pos.	Player	Date of birth (age)	Club
1	GK	Tómas Petersson	29 March 2009 (age 17)	(Football Association of Iceland) Valur
12	GK	Duro Stefan Beic	17 May 2009 (age 17)	(Football Association of Iceland) Stjarnan
	DF	Viktor Gaciarski	8 September 2009 (age 17)	(Football Association of Iceland) Kári
4	DF	Nökkvi Arnarson	30 October 2009 (age 17)	(Football Association of Iceland) HK
13	DF	Skarphéðinn Gauti Ingimarsson	12 March 2009 (age 17)	(Football Association of Iceland) KR
14	DF	Markús Andri Daníelsson Martin	16 February 2010 (age 16)	(Football Association of Iceland) Stjarnan
5	DF	Egill Valur Karlsson	9 January 2009 (age 17)	(Football Association of Iceland) Keflavík
2	DF	Brynjar Óðinn Atlason	17 April 2009 (age 17)	(Football Association of Iceland) ÍA
16	MF	Aron Freyr Heimisson	31 August 2009 (age 17)	(Football Association of Iceland) Stjarnan
6	MF	Jakob Ocares	4 April 2009 (age 17)	(Football Association of Iceland) Þróttur R.
8	MF	Jón Viktor Hauksson	1 January 2009 (age 17)	(Football Association of Iceland) Kári
15	MF	Snorri Kristinsson	6 March 2009 (age 17)	(Football Association of Iceland) KA
3	MF	Björn Darri Oddgeirsson	7 May 2009 (age 17)	(Italian Football Federation) Inter Milan
	MF	Sigurður Kárason	10 December 2009 (age 16)	(Football Association of Iceland) KR
18	MF	Mattías Kjeld	21 September 2009 (age 17)	(Football Association of Iceland) Grótta
7	FW	Aron Daði Svavarsson	2 April 2009 (age 17)	(Football Association of Iceland) FH
11	FW	Thorri Ingólfsson	24 August 2009 (age 17)	(Football Association of Iceland) Víkingur
10	FW	Alexander Rafn Pálmason	7 April 2010 (age 16)	(Football Association of Iceland) KR
9	FW	Birkir Þorsteinsson	12 May 2009 (age 17)	(Football Association of Iceland) Breiðablik
19	FW	Róbert Agnar Daðason	9 January 2009 (age 17)	(Football Association of Iceland) Afturelding
20	FW	Bjarki Garðarsson	11 February 2010 (age 16)	(Football Association of Iceland) Stjarnan

=== Recent call-ups ===
The following players have also been called up to Iceland U17 within the last twelve months and are still eligible for selection.

Pos.	Player	Date of birth (age)	Caps	Goals	Club	Latest call-up

== See also ==
- Iceland men's national football team
- Iceland men's national under-21 football team
- Iceland men's national under-19 football team
- Iceland women's national football team
