= Haxhi Rrena =

Albanian footballer (born 2010)

Personal information
- Date of birth: 18 January 2010 (age 16)
- Place of birth: Kavajë, Albania
- Positions: Forward; attacking midfielder

Team information
- Current team: Besa
- Number: 14

Youth career
- 2018–2025: Besa Kavajë

Senior career*
Years	Team	Apps	(Gls)
2026–	Besa Kavajë	10	(4)

International career
2024–2025	Albania U15	14	(10)
2026	Albania U16	3	(0)
2026–	Albania U17	2	(2)
- * Club domestic league appearances and goals

Haxhi Rrena (born 18 January 2010) is an Albanian professional footballer who plays as a forward for Besa Kavajë in the Albanian Kategoria e Parë. He has represented Albania at under-15, under-16 and under-17 international levels.

== Club career ==
=== Besa Kavajë ===
Rrena began playing football at a young age, joining his hometown club Besa's youth academy. He progressed through the club's youth ranks, representing its teams from the under-9 to the under-19 levels. During the 2023–24 season, he helped Besa's under-16 team secure promotion to the top division. By December 2025, he had scored 101 goals across all competitions.

Rrena made his senior debut for Besa at the age of 16 under head coach Gugash Magani, appearing as a substitute in a match against Skënderbeu. He entered the match in the 60th minute, replacing Patrik Treni, and wore the number 14 shirt.

During his first season with the senior team, Rrena recorded four goals and one assist in 10 appearances, many of which came as a late substitute.

== International career ==
Rrena first featured for Albania's regional under-14 representative team in October 2023, playing in a friendly against Internacional Tirana.

=== Under-15 ===
Rrena subsequently represented Albania at under-15 level, scoring in a 2–2 friendly draw against Kosovo on 30 May 2024 and twice in a 9–1 victory over San Marino in the UEFA Development Tournament later that year. Appointed captain, he scored the winning goal in a 1–0 friendly victory over Switzerland on 5 June 2025.

=== Under-16 ===
In 2026, Rrena was selected for Albania's under-16 squad for the UEFA Development Tournament and started in their opening match, a 2–1 defeat against Japan on 1 April.

=== Under-17 ===
Rrena progressed to the under-17 team in 2026, scoring in a 5–1 friendly victory over Montenegro on 28 September. In November, he was included in Albania's squad for the first qualifying round of the 2027 UEFA European Under-17 Championship and started in the opening 0–0 draw against Sweden on 11 November.
