= Asmir Avdukić =

Bosnian footballer (born 1981)

Personal information
- Date of birth: 13 May 1981 (age 45)
- Place of birth: Breza, SFR Yugoslavia
- Height: 1.90 m (6 ft 3 in)
- Position: Goalkeeper

Team information
- Current team: Bosnia and Herzegovina U17 (manager)

Youth career
- 2000–2004: Čelik Zenica

Senior career*
Years	Team	Apps	(Gls)
2001–2005	Čelik Zenica	108	(0)
2006–2007	Kamen Ingrad	18	(0)
2007	Travnik	15	(0)
2007–2008	Sloboda Tuzla	4	(0)
2008–2009	Radnik Bijeljina	36	(0)
2009–2010	Rudar Prijedor	29	(0)
2010–2015	Borac Banja Luka	124	(0)
2012	→ Persepolis (loan)	0	(0)
2015–2016	Radnik Bijeljina	32	(0)
2016–2017	Borac Banja Luka	39	(0)
2018–2021	Željezničar Banja Luka	49	(0)

International career
2002–2003	Bosnia and Herzegovina U21	6	(0)
2004–2013	Bosnia and Herzegovina	3	(0)

Managerial career
- 2021–2022: Željezničar Banja Luka
- 2025–: Bosnia and Herzegovina U17
- * Club domestic league appearances and goals

Asmir Avdukić (born 13 May 1981) is a Bosnian football manager and former player who played as a goalkeeper. He is the current manager of the Bosnia and Herzegovina U17 national team.

== Club career ==
Avdukić previously played for Kamen Ingrad in the Croatian Prva HNL. He had 19 clean sheets with FK Borac Banja Luka in the 2010–11 season.

In February 2012, Avdukić moved to Persepolis, but he could not play in the 2011–12 season. He played in the 2012 AFC Champions League.

== International career ==
Avdukić made his senior debut for Bosnia and Herzegovina in an April 2004 friendly match against Finland and has earned a total of 3 caps, scoring no goals. His final international was a February 2013 friendly against Slovenia.

== Career statistics ==
=== Club ===
Club performance			League		Cup		Continental		Total	
Season	Club	League	Apps	Goals	Apps	Goals	Apps	Goals	Apps	Goals
Iran			League		Hazfi Cup		Asia		Total	
2011–12	Persepolis	Pro League	—				7	0	7	0
Career total			0	0	0	0	7	0	7	0

== Honours ==
=== Player ===
Travnik

- First League of FBiH: 2006–07

Borac Banja Luka

- Bosnian Premier League: 2010–11
- Republika Srpska Cup: 2010–11

Radnik Bijeljina

- Bosnian Cup: 2015–16
- Republika Srpska Cup: 2015–16
