= Latvia national under-17 football team =

National U-17 association football team

Latvia Under-17
- Nickname: Sarkanbaltsarkanie (The red-white-reds)
- Association: Latvian Football Federation
- Confederation: UEFA (Europe)
- Head coach: (Latvia) Aleksandrs Basovs
- Captain: Reinis Flaksis
- Most caps: Vitālijs Maksimenko (17)
- Top scorer: Vitālijs Maksimenko (9)
- FIFA code: LVA
| First colours | Second colours |

Biggest win
- Latvia 7–0 San Marino (Riga, Latvia; 24 April 2019)

Biggest defeat
- Spain 5–0 Latvia (Los Ángeles de San Rafael, Spain; 11 October 2025); Latvia 0–5 Israel (Kyiv, Ukraine; 27 August 2019); Belgium 5–0 Latvia (Orhei, Moldova; 28 October 2018); Belgium 5–0 Latvia (Warsaw, Poland; 29 August 2014); Belgium 5–0 Latvia (Sint-Niklaas, Belgium; 25 October 2012)

European U-17 Championships
- Appearances: 1 (first in 2027)

FIFA U-17 World Cup
- Appearances: None

The Latvia national under-17 football team or Latvia U-17 represents Latvia in association football at the under-17 youth level, and is controlled by the Latvian Football Federation.

The team is for Latvian players aged 17 or under at the start of a two-year UEFA European Under-17 Championship cycle, so players appearing for the team can actually be up to 19 years of age. It is considered a feeder team of the Latvian under-19 and under-21 teams.

== Competition history ==
Prior to Latvia's independence in 1991, Latvian players were eligible for selection to the Soviet Union U-16 team. Following the dissolution of the Soviet Union, the Latvian Football Federation was admitted to UEFA as a full member in 1992, and the Latvia U-16 team played their first competitive matches in the first phase of the qualifying tournament for the 1994 European U-16 Championship. The team's competitive debut came on 18 September 1993 against Russia U-16 and they finished their first qualifying campaign as 3rd out of 3 teams, behind Russia and Norway.

Although the team has continued to participate in every under-16 and under-17 European Championship qualifying cycle since 1994, the team has never qualified for any of the tournaments.

=== European Championship ===
==== Under-16 format ====
| Year | Round | GP | W | D | L | GS | GA |
|---|---|---|---|---|---|---|---|
| (Republic of Ireland) 1994 | did not qualify | | | | | | |
| (Belgium) 1995 | did not qualify | | | | | | |
| (Austria) 1996 | did not qualify | | | | | | |
| (Germany) 1997 | did not qualify | | | | | | |
| (Scotland) 1998 | did not qualify | | | | | | |
| (Czech Republic) 1999 | did not qualify | | | | | | |
| (Israel) 2000 | did not qualify | | | | | | |
| (England) 2001 | did not qualify | | | | | | |
| Total | 0/8 | 0 | 0 | 0 | 0 | 0 | 0 |

==== Under-17 format ====
| Year | Round | GP | W | D | L | GS | GA |
|---|---|---|---|---|---|---|---|
| (Denmark) 2002 | did not qualify | | | | | | |
| (Portugal) 2003 | did not qualify | | | | | | |
| (France) 2004 | did not qualify | | | | | | |
| (Italy) 2005 | did not qualify | | | | | | |
| (Luxembourg) 2006 | did not qualify | | | | | | |
| (Belgium) 2007 | did not qualify | | | | | | |
| (Turkey) 2008 | did not qualify | | | | | | |
| (Germany) 2009 | did not qualify | | | | | | |
| (Liechtenstein) 2010 | did not qualify | | | | | | |
| (Serbia) 2011 | did not qualify | | | | | | |
| (Slovenia) 2012 | did not qualify | | | | | | |
| (Slovakia) 2013 | did not qualify | | | | | | |
| (Malta) 2014 | did not qualify | | | | | | |
| (Bulgaria) 2015 | did not qualify | | | | | | |
| (Azerbaijan) 2016 | did not qualify | | | | | | |
| (Croatia) 2017 | did not qualify | | | | | | |
| (England) 2018 | did not qualify | | | | | | |
| (Republic of Ireland) 2019 | did not qualify | | | | | | |
| (Estonia) ~~2020~~ | Cancelled due to COVID-19 pandemic | | | | | | |
| (Cyprus) ~~2021~~ | Cancelled due to COVID-19 pandemic | | | | | | |
| (Israel) 2022 | did not qualify | | | | | | |
| (Hungary) 2023 | did not qualify | | | | | | |
| (Cyprus) 2024 | did not qualify | | | | | | |
| (Albania) 2025 | did not qualify | | | | | | |
| (Estonia) 2026 | did not qualify | | | | | | |
| (Latvia) 2027 | Qualified as hosts | | | | | | |
| (Lithuania) 2028 | TBD | | | | | | |
| Total | 0/22 | 0 | 0 | 0 | 0 | 0 | 0 |

== Current players ==
The following players were called up for 2026 UEFA European Under-17 Championship qualification matches.

| No. | Pos. | Player | Date of birth (age) | Club |
|---|---|---|---|---|
| | GK | Hugo Viļķins | 12 February 2010 (age 16) | (Latvian Football Federation) JDFS Alberts |
| | GK | Kristers Purmalis | 14 August 2010 (age 16) | (Royal Belgian Football Association) ROFC Stockel |
| | DF | Edgars Aščuks | 25 March 2010 (age 16) | (Latvian Football Federation) FK Metta |
| | DF | Gustavs Maslinarskis | 5 April 2010 (age 16) | (Latvian Football Federation) JDFS Alberts |
| | DF | Kristaps Zvilna | 3 January 2010 (age 16) | (Latvian Football Federation) Mārupes SC |
| | DF | Matīss Mičulis | 6 February 2010 (age 16) | (Latvian Football Federation) FK Metta |
| | MF | Andris Aizsilnieks | 28 March 2010 (age 16) | (Latvian Football Federation) FK Metta |
| | MF | Roberts Vientiess | 28 June 2010 (age 16) | (Latvian Football Federation) FK Metta |
| | MF | Olivers Jēkabs Ozoliņš | 11 December 2010 (age 15) | (Latvian Football Federation) Liepājas FS |
| | MF | Rodrigo Laimiņš | 28 May 2010 (age 16) | (Latvian Football Federation) FK Metta |
| | MF | Davids Kurakins | 30 December 2010 (age 15) | (Latvian Football Federation) RFS |
| | MF | Daņila Sļusarevs | 18 June 2010 (age 16) | (Latvian Football Federation) RFS |
| | MF | Iļja Harlamovs | 28 May 2010 (age 16) | (Latvian Football Federation) BFC Daugavpils |
| | MF | Adrians Kurakins | 30 December 2010 (age 15) | (Latvian Football Federation) RFS |
| | MF | Filips Aleksandrs Kovalers | 23 July 2010 (age 16) | |
| | MF | Henrijs Holtoms | 28 March 2010 (age 16) | (Swiss Football Association) Lausanne |
| | MF | Zahars Maligins | 9 September 2010 (age 16) | (Royal Spanish Football Federation) EF Huesca |
| | MF | Denis Ignatjevs | 20 February 2010 (age 16) | (Latvian Football Federation) Super Nova |
| | FW | Miroslavs Mogiļevičs | 16 February 2010 (age 16) | (Latvian Football Federation) RFS |
| | FW | Tomass Bergs | 1 July 2010 (age 16) | (Latvian Football Federation) BFC Daugavpils |
| | FW | Miks Siliņš | 22 February 2010 (age 16) | (Latvian Football Federation) Mārupes SC |

== See also ==
- Latvia national football team
- Latvia national under-21 football team
- Latvia national under-19 football team
