= Sigurður Kárason =

Icelandic footballer (born 2009)

Personal information
- Full name: Sigurður Breki Kárason
- Date of birth: 10 December 2009 (age 16)
- Place of birth: Reykjavík, Iceland
- Position: Attacking midfielder

Team information
- Current team: KR
- Number: 30

Youth career
- –2024: KR

Senior career*
Years	Team	Apps	(Gls)
2025–	KR	20	(5)

International career^{‡}
2023	Iceland U15	3	(0)
2025–	Iceland U16	3	(0)
2025–	Iceland U17	3	(1)
2026–	Iceland U19	4	(1)
- * Club domestic league appearances and goals as of 16 November 2026 ‡ National team caps and goals as of 16 November 2026

Sigurður Breki Kárason (born 10 December 2009) is an Icelandic footballer who plays as a attacking midfielder for Besta deild karla club KR.

== Club career ==
In April 2025, Sigurður made his senior team debut with KR, and became the youngest ever player to start a game in the Besta deild karla. On 19 April he scored his first senior team goal in a Cup win against Knattspyrnufélagið Ásvöllum. On 20 May, he suffered a collarbone fracture after colliding with an opponent in a game against Afturelding, causing him to miss several weeks.

== International career ==
Sigurður is a youth international for Iceland.
