= Sweden men's national under-17 football team =

National association football team

Sweden Under-17
- Nickname: Blågult (The Blue-Yellow)
- Association: Svenska Fotbollförbundet (SvFF)
- Confederation: UEFA (Europe)
- Head coach: Axel Kjäll (Team 2008); Mirza Jelečak (Team 2009)
First colours	Second colours

First international
- Denmark 3–1 Sweden (Tårnby, Denmark; 5 September 1964)

UEFA U-17 Championship
- Appearances: 14 (first in 1985)
- Best result: Semi-finals (2013)

FIFA U-17 World Cup
- Appearances: 1 (first in 2013)
- Best result: Third place (2013)

The Sweden men's national under-17 football team (Swedish: svenska pojklandslaget i fotboll) is the football team representing Sweden in competitions for under-17-year-old players. Primarily, it competes to qualify for the annual UEFA European Under-17 Championship.

In the 2013 UEFA European Under-17 Championship, Sweden reached the semi-finals where they were knocked out on penalties by Russia. In the 2013 FIFA U-17 World Cup they finished in third place after beating Argentina with 4–1 in the third-place match. Valmir Berisha scored three goals in the match and thus became the top scorer of the tournament.

== Competitive record ==
Champions Runners-up Third place Fourth place Tournament held on home soil

=== FIFA U-17 World Cup ===
FIFA U-17 World Cup record									FIFA U-17 World Cup qualification record					
Year	Round	Position	Pld	W	D	L	GF	GA	Pld	W	D	L	GF	GA
(China) 1985	Did not qualify								12	6	4	2	12	6
(Canada) 1987	Did not qualify								2	0	1	1	3	4
(Scotland) 1989	Did not qualify								2	0	1	1	2	4
(Italy) 1991	Did not qualify								5	3	1	1	7	2
(Japan) 1993	Did not qualify								4	0	0	4	1	14
(Ecuador) 1995	Did not qualify								6	3	1	2	7	6
(Egypt) 1997	Did not qualify								2	1	0	1	2	1
(New Zealand) 1999	Did not qualify								5	3	0	2	12	7
(Trinidad and Tobago) 2001	Did not qualify								2	1	1	0	3	1
(Finland) 2003	Did not qualify								3	1	0	2	10	4
(Peru) 2005	Did not qualify								3	1	1	1	3	2
(South Korea) 2007	Did not qualify								6	1	2	3	8	12
(Nigeria) 2009	Did not qualify								3	1	0	2	4	4
(Mexico) 2011	Did not qualify								3	0	1	2	0	4
(United Arab Emirates) 2013	Third place	3rd	7	4	1	2	15	11	10	5	5	0	19	5
(Chile) 2015	Did not qualify								6	1	2	3	3	12
(India) 2017	Did not qualify								6	3	0	3	14	8
(Brazil) 2019	Did not qualify								9	3	1	5	16	18
(Peru) ~~2021~~	Cancelled								Cancelled					
(Indonesia) 2023	Did not qualify								3	0	2	1	6	8
(Qatar) 2025	Did not qualify								6	3	0	3	15	9
(Qatar) 2026	Did not qualify								6	4	1	1	18	8
(Qatar) 2027	To be determined								To be determined					
(Qatar) 2028	To be determined								To be determined					
(Qatar) 2029	To be determined								To be determined					
Total	Best: Third place	1/20	7	4	1	2	15	11	98	36	23	39	147	131

=== UEFA European Under-17 Championship ===
UEFA European Under-17 Championship record									UEFA European Under-17 Championship qualification record					
Year	Round	Position	Pld	W	D	L	GF	GA	Pld	W	D	L	GF	GA
(Italy) 1982	Did not qualify								6	3	3	0	8	2
(West Germany) 1984	Did not qualify								6	3	1	2	4	4
(Hungary) 1985	Group stage	6th	3	2	0	1	8	7	4	0	3	1	3	7
(Greece) 1986	Group stage	14th	3	0	1	2	0	4	2	1	1	0	4	2
(France) 1987	Did not qualify								2	0	1	1	3	4
(Spain) 1988	Group stage	5th	3	1	2	0	3	2	2	1	1	0	8	3
(Denmark) 1989	Did not qualify								2	0	1	1	2	4
(East Germany) 1990	Group stage	7th	3	1	2	0	6	3	2	2	0	0	7	3
(Switzerland) 1991	Group stage	8th	3	2	0	1	2	1	2	1	1	0	5	1
(Cyprus) 1992	Did not qualify								2	1	0	1	2	3
(Turkey) 1993	Did not qualify								4	0	0	4	1	14
(Republic of Ireland) 1994	Did not qualify								4	1	0	3	4	5
(Belgium) 1995	Quarter-finals	8th	4	1	1	2	3	6	2	2	0	0	4	0
(Austria) 1996	Did not qualify								2	1	0	1	3	5
(Germany) 1997	Did not qualify								2	1	0	1	2	1
(Scotland) 1998	Group stage	13th	3	0	2	1	2	4	3	2	1	0	8	5
(Czech Republic) 1999	Group stage	12th	3	1	0	2	3	5	2	2	0	0	9	2
(Israel) 2000	Did not qualify								3	1	0	2	3	4
(England) 2001	Did not qualify								2	1	1	0	3	1
(Denmark) 2002	Did not qualify								2	0	0	2	0	3
(Portugal) 2003	Did not qualify								3	1	0	2	10	4
(France) 2004	Did not qualify								3	0	1	2	1	5
(Italy) 2005	Did not qualify								3	1	1	1	3	2
(Luxembourg) 2006	Did not qualify								6	2	2	2	12	10
(Belgium) 2007	Did not qualify								6	1	2	3	8	12
(Turkey) 2008	Did not qualify								6	2	2	2	9	12
(Germany) 2009	Did not qualify								3	1	0	2	4	4
(Liechtenstein) 2010	Did not qualify								6	3	2	1	9	4
(Serbia) 2011	Did not qualify								3	0	1	2	0	4
(Slovenia) 2012	Did not qualify								6	3	2	1	8	3
(Slovakia) 2013	Semi-finals	3rd	4	1	3	0	2	1	6	4	2	0	17	4
(Malta) 2014	Did not qualify								6	1	1	4	3	9
(Bulgaria) 2015	Did not qualify								6	1	2	3	3	12
(Azerbaijan) 2016	Quarter-finals	6th	4	2	0	2	3	3	6	3	2	1	10	6
(Croatia) 2017	Did not qualify								6	3	0	3	14	8
(England) 2018	Quarter-finals	8th	4	2	0	2	4	3	6	2	4	0	12	2
(Republic of Ireland) 2019	Group stage	15th	3	0	0	3	3	9	6	3	1	2	13	9
(Estonia) ~~2020~~	Cancelled								3	2	0	1	7	7
(Cyprus) ~~2021~~	Cancelled								Cancelled					
(Israel) 2022	Group stage	9th	3	2	0	1	5	5	6	2	4	0	16	6
(Hungary) 2023	Did not qualify								3	0	2	1	6	8
(Cyprus) 2024	Group stage	12th	3	0	2	1	3	4	6	4	1	1	11	7
(Albania) 2025	Did not qualify								6	3	0	3	15	9
(Estonia) 2026	Did not qualify								6	4	1	1	18	8
(Latvia) 2027	To be determined								To be determined					
(Lithuania) 2028	To be determined								To be determined					
(Moldova) 2029	To be determined								To be determined					
Total	Best: Semi-finals	14/41	46	15	13	18	47	57	167	65	46	56	274	220

== Players ==
=== Current squad ===
The following players have been called up for the most recent 2026 UEFA European Under-17 Championship qualification matches.

No.	Pos.	Player	Date of birth (age)	Club
1	GK	Benjamin Norell	14 July 2009 (age 17)	(Swedish Football Association) Hammarby IF
12	GK	Vincent Arnström	24 March 2009 (age 17)	(Swedish Football Association) IF Brommapojkarna
13	DF	Elliot Mahama Appring	29 May 2009 (age 17)	(Swedish Football Association) AIK
22	DF	Oliver Djurci	23 March 2009 (age 17)	(Swedish Football Association) IF Brommapojkarna
3	DF	Hampus Thorsson	11 November 2009 (age 16)	(Swedish Football Association) Hammarby IF
4	DF	Lino Wernberg Hyppänen	26 January 2009 (age 17)	(Swedish Football Association) Helsingborgs
5	DF	Hugo Lindskog	17 July 2009 (age 17)	(Swedish Football Association) IF Elfsborg
15	DF	Beppe Bössman	15 April 2009 (age 17)	(Swedish Football Association) AIK
2	DF	Elias Khalil	11 March 2009 (age 17)	(Swedish Football Association) Malmö FF
8	MF	Samin Mujevic	5 July 2009 (age 17)	(Swedish Football Association) Malmö FF
18	MF	Alexander Johansson	3 September 2009 (age 17)	(Swedish Football Association) IFK Stocksund
19	MF	Jakob Jensen	16 February 2009 (age 17)	(Swedish Football Association) Hammarby IF
21	MF	Alexander Andersson	25 April 2010 (age 16)	(Swedish Football Association) Djurgårdens IF
6	MF	Oliver Månsson	4 August 2009 (age 17)	(Swedish Football Association) IFK Göteborg
16	MF	Leon Westin Bryhn	10 January 2009 (age 17)	(Royal Spanish Football Federation) Real Madrid
17	MF	Nikolas Jovanovic	27 April 2009 (age 17)	(Royal Dutch Football Association) PSV
11	FW	Lucas Landgren Persson	9 July 2009 (age 17)	(Swedish Football Association) Helsingborgs
7	FW	Gabriel Santos	4 August 2009 (age 17)	(Danish Football Association) København
10	FW	Alexander Odefalk	21 March 2009 (age 17)	(Danish Football Association) København
9	FW	Leonel Eklund	27 March 2009 (age 17)	(Danish Football Association) Nordsjælland
14	FW	Oskar Stålfors	27 January 2009 (age 17)	(Swedish Football Association) Djurgårdens IF
20	FW	Vidar Skoglund	5 April 2009 (age 17)	(Swedish Football Association) Malmö FF

=== Recent call-ups ===
The following players have also been called up within the last twelve months, and remain eligible for selection

Pos.	Player	Date of birth (age)	Caps	Goals	Club	Latest call-up

== Head-to-head record ==
The following table shows Sweden's head-to-head record in the FIFA U-17 World Cup.

Opponent	Pld	W	D	L	GF	GA	GD	Win %
Argentina	1	1	0	0	4	1	+3	100.00
Honduras	1	1	0	0	2	1	+1	100.00
Iraq	1	1	0	0	4	1	+3	100.00
Japan	1	1	0	0	2	1	+1	100.00
Mexico	1	0	0	1	0	1	−1	0.00
Nigeria	2	0	1	1	3	6	−3	0.00
Total	7	4	1	2	15	11	+4	57.14

== See also ==
- Sweden men's national football team
- Sweden Olympic football team
- Sweden national under-21 football team
- Sweden men's national under-19 football team
- Sweden women's national under-17 football team
- FIFA U-17 World Cup
- UEFA European Under-17 Championship
- Nordic Under-17 Football Championship
