= Roland Vieira =

French footballer and manager (born 1979)

Personal information
- Date of birth: 16 August 1979 (age 47)
- Place of birth: Mâcon, France
- Height: 1.78 m (5 ft 10 in)
- Position: Striker

Team information
- Current team: Andrézieux (manager)

Senior career*
Years	Team	Apps	(Gls)
1997–2003	Lyon B	68	(30)
2000–2001	→ Angers (loan)	23	(4)
2002–2003	→ Sion (loan)	8	(2)
2003–2005	Libourne	52	(19)
2005–2007	Chamois Niortais	33	(7)
2007–2008	Gazélec Ajaccio	21	(2)
2008–2010	Romorantin	56	(15)
2010–2011	Moulins	18	(1)
2012	Andrézieux		
2012–2013	Le Puy	20	(7)

Managerial career
- 2013–2023: Le Puy
- 2023–2024: Stade Briochin
- 2024–2025: Mâcon
- 2025–: Andrézieux
- * Club domestic league appearances and goals

Roland Vieira (born 16 August 1979) is a French professional football manager and former player who is the manager of Championnat National 1 club Andrézieux. In his playing career, he was a striker. Clubs he played for include Angers, Sion, Libourne, Chamois Niortais, Gazélec Ajaccio, and Romorantin.

== Honours ==
=== Player ===
Chamois Niortais

- Championnat National: 2005–06

=== Manager ===
Le Puy

- Championnat National 2: 2021–22
- Championnat de France Amateur 2: 2014–15
