= Bjarki Garðarsson =

Icelandic footballer (born 2010)

Personal information
- Full name: Bjarki Hrafn Garðarsson
- Date of birth: 11 February 2010 (age 16)
- Place of birth: Iceland
- Height: 1.94 m (6 ft 4 in)
- Position: Forward

Team information
- Current team: Borussia Dortmund U19
- Number: 28

Youth career
- –2026: Stjarnan
- 2026–: Borussia Dortmund

Senior career*
Years	Team	Apps	(Gls)
2026	Stjarnan	3	(0)

International career^{‡}
2024	Iceland U15	3	(2)
2026	Iceland U16	5	(3)
2025–	Iceland U17	10	(5)
- * Club domestic league appearances and goals ‡ National team caps and goals as of 29 September 2026

Bjarki Hrafn Garðarsson (born 11 February 2010) is an Icelandic professional footballer who plays as a forward for the under-19 team of Bundesliga club Borussia Dortmund.

== Early life ==
Bjarki was born on 11 February 2010. Born in Iceland, he is the son of former Iceland international Garðar Jóhannsson.

== Club career ==
As a youth player, Bjarki joined the youth academy of Stjarnan and was promoted to the club's senior team in 2025, where he made three league appearances and scored zero goals. Following his stint there, he joined the youth academy of German Bundesliga side Borussia Dortmund ahead of the 2026–27 season.

== International career ==
Bjarki is an Iceland youth international and has represented the country internationally at under-15, under-16, and under-17 level. Altogether, he made three appearances and scored two goals while playing for the Iceland men's national under-15 football team and five appearances and scored three goals while playing for the Iceland men's national under-16 football team.

During the autumn of 2025, the spring of 2026, and September 2026, he played for the Iceland men's national under-17 football team for 2027 UEFA European Under-17 Championship qualification.

== Style of play ==
Bjarki plays as a forward, is left-footed and has received comparisons to Norway international Erling Haaland.

German newspaper Ruhr Nachrichten wrote in 2026 he is "a physically imposing and determined striker... whether with his head or his feet – the lanky 1.94-meter-tall striker is there when he's needed. He slips past his markers and appears exactly where a center forward needs to be. A goalscorer with instinct, indeed. BVB talent Enzo Duarte walks across the pitch and looks over his shoulder. But even outside the penalty area... Gardarsson holds up the ball, shields it with his body, and lays it off cleanly for advancing teammates".
