= Thibault Bourgeois =

French football player (born 1990)

Personal information
- Full name: Thibault Bourgeois
- Date of birth: 5 January 1990 (age 36)
- Place of birth: Maizières-lès-Metz, France
- Height: 1.78 m (5 ft 10 in)
- Position: Striker

Team information
- Current team: UN Käerjéng 97

Youth career
- 1994–2002: FC Pierrevillers
- 2002–2008: Metz

Senior career*
Years	Team	Apps	(Gls)
2008–2014	Metz	75	(11)
2011–2012	→ Martigues (loan)	10	(2)
2014–2015	CA Bastia	11	(0)
2015–2016	Jeunesse Arlonaise		(0)
2015–	UN Käerjéng 97		(0)

International career
2005–2006	France U16	18	(5)
2006–2007	France U17	13	(4)
2008–2009	France U19	2	(0)
2010–	France U20	2	(1)
- * Club domestic league appearances and goals as of 31 August 2014

Thibault Bourgeois (born 5 January 1990) is a French professional footballer who plays for Luxembourgish club UN Käerjéng 97 as a striker.

== Club career ==
Bourgeois started his career with FC Pierrevillers before moving to hometown club FC Metz at age 12. He graduated from the club's academy in 2007. Bourgeois signed his first professional contract with Metz on 21 May 2007 keeping him with the club until 2010. He did not play the next season during Metz's run in Ligue 1, in which they were quickly relegated back to Ligue 2. Bourgeois finally made his debut on 19 December 2008 in a Ligue 2 match against Troyes coming on as a substitute in the 57th minute. With Metz trailing 3–0, Bourgeois provided some hope for Metz supporters as he scored his first professional goal on his debut in the 71st minute. Metz lost the match 3–1.

In the summer of 2014, he joined the recently relegated side CA Bastia.

== International career ==
Bourgeois is a French youth international. He has played on the under-17 team and was a part of the squad that played in the 2007 FIFA U-17 World Cup in South Korea.
