= Gabriel Rajkovic =

Norwegian footballer (born 2011)

Personal information
- Full name: Gabriel Larsen Rajkovic
- Date of birth: 23 February 2011 (age 15)
- Place of birth: Oslo, Norway
- Position: Winger

Team information
- Current team: Vålerenga
- Number: 9

Youth career
- 2017–2024: Nordstrand
- 2024–2025: KFUM
- 2025–2026: Vålerenga

Senior career*
Years	Team	Apps	(Gls)
2026–	Vålerenga	17	(3)

International career^{‡}
2025	Norway U15	3	(1)
2026–	Norway U16	2	(1)
- * Club domestic league appearances and goals ‡ National team caps and goals as of 6 September 2026

Gabriel Larsen Rajkovic (born 23 February 2011) is a Norwegian professional footballer who plays as a winger for Eliteserien club Vålerenga.

== Early life ==
Rajkovic was born on 23 February 2011. Born in Norway, he is a native of Oslo.

== Club career ==
As a youth player, Rajkovic began his career with the youth academy of Nordstrand. Already at 13 years of age he trained with Nordstrand's senior team. Following his stint there, he joined the youth academy of KFUM. One year later, he joined the youth academy of Vålerenga and was promoted to the club's senior team ahead of the 2026 season.

Rajkovic made his senior debut for Vålerenga in a pre-season friendly on 30 January 2026, aged 14, and scored in the same match. On 3 March 2026, a few days after his 15th birthday, he signed a four-year professional contract with the club. On 15 March, Rajkovic made his Eliteserien debut as a substitute in Vålerenga's opening league match against Sandefjord at Intility Arena. At 15 years and 20 days old, he became the youngest player in Eliteserien history. Later that year, on 8 August, he scored his first Eliteserien goal in a 2–1 defeat to Bodø/Glimt, becoming the second-youngest player to score in the competition at 15 years and 166 days old, just 15 days older than record-holder Martin Ødegaard.

== International career ==
Rajkovic was born in Norway to a Serbian father and Norwegian mother. He is also of Moroccan and Belgian descent through his grandparents, and eligible to play for Norway, Serbia, Morocco and Belgium. He is a Norway youth international. On 25 March 2026, he debuted for the Norway national under-16 football team during a 3–0 away friendly win over the Morocco national under-16 team.

== Style of play ==
Rajkovic plays as a winger. English news website Goal wrote in 2026 that he "is a winger who prefers to play on the left despite being left-footed, but he can also be deployed on the opposite flank and has even played as a centre-forward when required".
