= 1985 UEFA European Under-16 Championship =

1985–ös U16-os labdarúgó-Európa-bajnokság

Tournament details
- Host country: Hungary
- Dates: 17–26 May
- Teams: 16 (from 1 confederation)
- Venues: 14 (in 14 host cities)

Final positions
- Champions: Soviet Union (1st title)
- Runners-up: Greece
- Third place: Spain
- Fourth place: East Germany

Tournament statistics
- Matches played: 28
- Goals scored: 69 (2.46 per match)

The 1985 UEFA European Under-16 Championship was the 3rd edition of the UEFA's European Under-16 Football Championship. Hungary hosted the 16 teams that contested during 17–26 May 1985.

Soviet Union won its first title.

== Participants ==
- Bulgaria
- East Germany
- France
- Greece
- Hungary
- Iceland
- Italy
- Netherlands
- Norway
- Portugal
- Scotland
- Soviet Union
- Spain
- Sweden
- West Germany
- Yugoslavia

== Results ==
=== First stage ===
==== Group A ====
Team	Pld	W	D	L	GF	GA	GD	Pts
Soviet Union	3	3	0	0	6	1	+5	6
West Germany	3	1	1	1	3	3	0	3
Hungary	3	1	0	2	2	3	−1	2
Portugal	3	0	1	2	1	5	−4	1

17 May 1985

Soviet Union	2–0	Hungary

Zalaegerszeg

17 May 1985

West Germany	1–1	Portugal

Városi Sporttelep, Keszthely

19 May 1985

Hungary	2–0	Portugal

Nagykanizsa

19 May 1985

Soviet Union	2–1	West Germany

Zalaegerszeg

21 May 1985

Soviet Union	2–0	Portugal

Városi Sporttelep, Keszthely

21 May 1985

West Germany	1–0	Hungary

Zalaegerszeg

==== Group B ====
Team	Pld	W	D	L	GF	GA	GD	Pts
Spain	3	1	2	0	4	0	+4	4
Sweden	3	2	0	1	8	7	+1	4
Yugoslavia	3	1	1	1	2	3	−1	3
Italy	3	0	1	2	2	6	−4	1

17 May 1985

Yugoslavia	1–0	Italy
Veradislavić 68'	Report

Szeged

17 May 1985

Sweden	0–4	Spain

Városi Stadion, Hódmezővásárhely

19 May 1985

Sweden	3–1	Yugoslavia

Városi Stadion, Hódmezővásárhely

19 May 1985

Italy	0–0	Spain

Szeged

21 May 1985

Sweden	5–2	Italy

Városi Stadion, Hódmezővásárhely

21 May 1985

Yugoslavia	0–0	Spain

Szeged

==== Group C ====
Team	Pld	W	D	L	GF	GA	GD	Pts
East Germany	3	1	2	0	2	1	+1	4
Norway	3	1	2	0	1	0	+1	4
Bulgaria	3	1	0	2	4	4	0	2
Netherlands	3	0	2	1	3	5	−2	2

17 May 1985

Norway	1–0	Bulgaria

Győr

17 May 1985

East Germany	1–1	Netherlands
	Report	46' Harry de Jong

Stadion ETO, Győr

19 May 1985

East Germany	1–0	Bulgaria

Kapuvár

19 May 1985

Norway	0–0	Netherlands
	Report

Wittmann Antal park, Mosonmagyaróvár

21 May 1985

Bulgaria	4–2	Netherlands
	Report	50', 51' Vonk

Stadion ETO, Győr

21 May 1985

East Germany	0–0	Norway

Győr

==== Group D ====
Team	Pld	W	D	L	GF	GA	GD	Pts
Greece	3	3	0	0	8	1	+7	6
France	3	2	0	1	7	2	+5	4
Scotland	3	1	0	2	3	5	−2	2
Iceland	3	0	0	3	0	10	−10	0

17 May 1985

Scotland	2–0	Iceland

Városi Stadion, Jászberény

17 May 1985

Greece	2–0	France

Tiszaligeti Stadion, Szolnok

19 May 1985

France	4–0	Iceland

Kunhegyes

19 May 1985

Greece	2–1	Scotland

Mezőtúr

21 May 1985

France	3–0	Scotland

Tiszaligeti Stadion, Szolnok

21 May 1985

Greece	4–0	Iceland

Karcag

=== Semi-finals ===
24 May 1985

Greece	0–0	Spain
Penalties
	4–3

Budapest
24 May 1985

Soviet Union	5–3	East Germany

Budapest

=== Third place match ===
26 May 1985

Spain	1–0	East Germany

Budapest

=== Final ===
26 May 1985

Soviet Union	4–0	Greece
Pantsulaia, Kobelev; Gasimov

Hidegkuti Nándor Stadium, Budapest
Referee: (Socialist Federal Republic of Yugoslavia) Stojan Ilievski (Yugoslavia)
