= Bastian Assomo =

German footballer (born 2010)

Personal information
- Full name: Bastian Friedrich Assomo
- Date of birth: 3 January 2010 (age 16)
- Place of birth: Berlin, Germany
- Height: 1.90 m (6 ft 3 in)
- Position: Striker

Team information
- Current team: Bayern Munich
- Number: 48

Youth career
- –2023: Füchse Berlin Reinickendorf
- 2023–2025: Hertha BSC
- 2025–: Bayern Munich

Senior career*
Years	Team	Apps	(Gls)
2026–	Bayern Munich	0	(0)
2026–	Bayern Munich II	13	(7)

International career^{‡}
2025	Germany U15	2	(2)
2025–	Germany U16	3	(4)
2026–	Germany U17	3	(8)
- * Club domestic league appearances and goals as of 7 November 2026 ‡ National team caps and goals as of 17 November 2026

Bastian Friedrich Assomo (born 3 January 2010) is a German professional footballer who plays as a striker for Regionalliga Bayern club Bayern Munich II. He is a German youth international.

== Early life ==
Assomo was born on 3 January 2010, in Berlin, Germany.

== Club career ==
As a youth player, Assomo joined the youth academy of Füchse Berlin Reinickendorf. Following his stint there, he joined the youth academy of Hertha BSC during the summer of 2023. Ahead of the 2025–26 season, he joined the youth academy of Bundesliga side Bayern Munich.

On 25 April, he was called-up with the Bayern Munich senior team by head coach Vincent Kompany for a 4–3 comeback away win Bundesliga match against Mainz 05, as an unused substitute however.

Assomo received his first call-up with Bayern Munich II on 8 May 2026, making his first start and professional debut during a 1–1 home draw Regionalliga Bayern match against VfB Eichstätt. Eight days later, he started with Bayern Munich II once again, scoring his first professional goal and the opening one during a 5–0 away win Regionalliga Bayern match against Viktoria Aschaffenburg, on May 16.

== International career ==
Born in Germany, Assomo is of Cameroonian descent. He is a German youth international, having represented the U15s and U16s since 2025.

== Personal life ==
Assomo is the younger brother of fellow footballer Allan Bohomo, who also progressed through the FC Bayern Campus.

== Career statistics ==
As of match played 7 November 2026

Appearances and goals by club, season and competition
Club	Season	League			Cup		Continental		Total	
Club	Season	Division	Apps	Goals	Apps	Goals	Apps	Goals	Apps	Goals
Bayern Munich	2025–26	Bundesliga	0	0	0	0	0	0	0	0
Bayern Munich	Total		0	0	0	0	0	0	0	0
Bayern Munich II	2025–26	Regionalliga Bayern	2	1	—		—		2	1
Bayern Munich II	2026–27	Regionalliga Bayern	11	6	—		—		11	6
Bayern Munich II	Total		13	7	—		—		13	7
Career Total			13	7	0	0	0	0	13	7

== Style of play ==
Assomo plays as a striker. German magazine Focus wrote in 2026 that he "possesses the profile of a classic center forward. Around 1.90 meters tall, physically imposing and extremely assertive".
