= 1996 UEFA European Under-16 Championship =

1996 UEFA Under-16 Championship
U-16-Fußball-Europameisterschaft 1996

Tournament details
- Host country: Austria
- Dates: 29 April – 11 May
- Teams: 16 (from 1 confederation)

Final positions
- Champions: Portugal (3rd title)
- Runners-up: France
- Third place: Israel
- Fourth place: Greece

Tournament statistics
- Matches played: 32
- Goals scored: 82 (2.56 per match)

The 1996 UEFA European Under-16 Championship was the 14th edition of the UEFA's European Under-16 Football Championship. Players born on or after 1 August 1979 were eligible to participate in this competition. Austria hosted the event, during 29 April – 11 May 1996. 16 teams contested. Portugal defended its title to defeat France and win the title for a third but not consecutive time. Portugal was the first team to win the title two consecutive seasons (1995, 1996). Spain became the second team to repeat the achievement (2007 and 2008).

== Participants ==
- Austria
- Croatia
- England
- France
- Germany
- Greece
- Republic of Ireland
- Israel
- Poland
- Portugal
- Romania
- Slovakia
- Spain
- Switzerland
- Turkey
- Ukraine

== Group stage ==
=== Group A ===
| Team | Pld | W | D | L | GF | GA | GD | Pts |
|---|---|---|---|---|---|---|---|---|
| Portugal | 3 | 2 | 1 | 0 | 7 | 2 | +5 | 7 |
| Republic of Ireland | 3 | 2 | 0 | 1 | 2 | 2 | 0 | 6 |
| Austria | 3 | 0 | 2 | 1 | 2 | 3 | −1 | 2 |
| Poland | 3 | 0 | 1 | 2 | 0 | 4 | −4 | 1 |

29 April 1996

| Republic of Ireland | 1–0 | Austria |
|---|---|---|
| Keane 79' |

Sankt Pölten
Referee: (Israel) Amit Klein

29 April 1996

| Portugal | 3–0 | Poland |
|---|---|---|
| Paulo Costa 25', 50'; Simão 55' |

Sierndorf
Attendance: (Finland) Mikko Vuorela

1 May 1996

| Austria | 0–0 | Poland |

Herzogenburg

1 May 1996

| Republic of Ireland | 0–2 | Portugal |
|---|---|---|
| | | Hugo Leal 58'; Hugo Cruz 76' |

Atzenbrugg
Referee: (Switzerland) Kurt Zuppinger

3 May 1996

| Poland | 0–1 | Republic of Ireland |
|---|---|---|
| | | McPhail 63' |

Würmla
Referee: (Cyprus) Costas Kapitanis

3 May 1996

| Austria | 2–2 | Portugal |
|---|---|---|
| Hack 34'; Kahraman 74' | | Hugo Cruz 8'; Petit 22' |

Ziersdorf

=== Group B ===
| Team | Pld | W | D | L | GF | GA | GD | Pts |
|---|---|---|---|---|---|---|---|---|
| Greece | 3 | 2 | 1 | 0 | 4 | 2 | +2 | 7 |
| Germany | 3 | 2 | 0 | 1 | 11 | 4 | +7 | 6 |
| Ukraine | 3 | 1 | 1 | 1 | 3 | 7 | −4 | 4 |
| Romania | 3 | 0 | 0 | 3 | 1 | 6 | −5 | 0 |

29 April 1996

| Greece | 2–1 | Germany |

Neunkirchen

29 April 1996

| Romania | 0–1 | Ukraine |

Bad Vöslau

1 May 1996

| Romania | 0–1 | Greece |

Scheiblingkirchen-Thernberg

1 May 1996

| Ukraine | 1–6 | Germany |

Kirchschlag in der Buckligen Welt

3 May 1996

| Germany | 4–1 | Romania |

Gloggnitz

3 May 1996

| Ukraine | 1–1 | Greece |

Kottingbrunn

=== Group C ===
| Team | Pld | W | D | L | GF | GA | GD | Pts |
|---|---|---|---|---|---|---|---|---|
| France | 3 | 3 | 0 | 0 | 6 | 0 | +6 | 9 |
| Croatia | 3 | 2 | 0 | 1 | 3 | 3 | 0 | 6 |
| Spain | 3 | 1 | 0 | 2 | 4 | 5 | −1 | 3 |
| Switzerland | 3 | 0 | 0 | 3 | 2 | 7 | −5 | 0 |

29 April 1996

| France | 2–0 | Croatia |

Scheibbs
Attendance: 600

29 April 1996

| Spain | 4–1 | Switzerland |
|---|---|---|
| Couñago 5'; Jaba 12'; Duarte 32' (pen.); Novo 75' | | Rotanzi 2' |

Pöchlarn
Referee: (Hungary) Attila Juhos

1 May 1996

| France | 3–0 | Spain |
|---|---|---|
| Réveillère 26'; Malbranque 52' (pen.); Suchet 60' (pen.) |

Persenbeug-Gottsdorf
Referee: (England) Graham Poll

1 May 1996

| Croatia | 2–1 | Switzerland |
|---|---|---|
| Deranja 24', 59' | | Chappuis 4' |

Ardagger
Attendance: 1,400

3 May 1996

| Switzerland | 0–1 | France |

Purgstall an der Erlauf

3 May 1996

| Croatia | 1–0 | Spain |
|---|---|---|
| Deranja 5' |

Ybbs an der Donau
Attendance: 600
Referee: (Poland) Tomasz Mikulski

=== Group D ===
| Team | Pld | W | D | L | GF | GA | GD | Pts |
|---|---|---|---|---|---|---|---|---|
| Israel | 3 | 2 | 0 | 1 | 4 | 4 | 0 | 6 |
| England | 3 | 2 | 0 | 1 | 5 | 3 | +2 | 6 |
| Slovakia | 3 | 1 | 0 | 2 | 2 | 4 | −2 | 3 |
| Turkey | 3 | 1 | 0 | 2 | 4 | 4 | 0 | 3 |

29 April 1996

| England | 2–0 | Slovakia |

Gmünd

29 April 1996

| Turkey | 3–0 | Israel |

Horn

1 May 1996

| England | 2–1 | Turkey |

Schrems

1 May 1996

| Slovakia | 0–2 | Israel |

Zellerndorf

3 May 1996

| Israel | 2–1 | England |

Retz

3 May 1996

| Slovakia | 2–0 | Turkey |

Zwettl

== Knockout stages ==
=== Bracket ===
Quarter-finals
6 May – Krems an der Donau
Portugal | 5
Croatia | 1
6 May – Baden bei Wien
Greece | 1
England | 0
6 May – Basel
Germany | 2
Israel (aet) | 3
6 May – Amstetten
France (p) | 0 (5)
Republic of Ireland | 0 (4)

Semi-finals
8 May – Tulln an der Donau
Portugal | 3
Greece | 0
8 May – Wiener Neustadt
Israel | 0
France | 1

Final
11 May – Vienna
Portugal | 1
France | 0
Third place
11 May – Vienna
Greece | 2
Israel | 3

=== Quarterfinals ===
6 May 1996

| Portugal | 5–1 | Croatia |
|---|---|---|
| Simão 2', 11', 39'; Nuno Gomes 5'; Celso 26' | | Horvat 23' |

Krems an der Donau

6 May 1996

| France | 0–0 | Republic of Ireland |
Penalties
| Réveillère (penalty scored); Vigier (penalty scored); Malbranque (penalty scored); Bernard (penalty scored); Sabourin (penalty scored) | 5–4 | (penalty scored) Clarke; (penalty scored) Crossley; (penalty scored) McPhail; (penalty scored) Mannion |

Amstetten
Referee: (Finland) Mikko Vuorela

6 May 1996

| Greece | 1–0 | England |

Baden bei Wien

6 May 1996

| Israel | 3 – 2 (a.e.t.) | Germany |

Stockerau

=== Semifinals ===
8 May 1996

| Portugal | 3–0 | Greece |
|---|---|---|
| Simão 6' (pen.); Paulo Costa 58'; Edgar Caseiro 66' |

Tulln an der Donau

8 May 1996

| France | 1–0 | Israel |
|---|---|---|
| Vieira 52' |

Wiener Neustadt

=== Third Place Playoff ===
11 May 1996

| Greece | 2–3 | Israel |

Vienna

=== Final ===
11 May 1996

| Portugal | 1–0 | France |
|---|---|---|
| Petit 43' |

Vienna
Referee: Konrad Plautz (Austria)
