= Kosmo Launiala =

Finnish footballer (born 2010)

Personal information
- Date of birth: 4 March 2010 (age 16)
- Place of birth: Finland
- Height: 1.83 m (6 ft 0 in)
- Position: Centre forward

Team information
- Current team: Gnistan
- Number: 45

Youth career
- –2025: Gnistan

Senior career*
Years	Team	Apps	(Gls)
2025	Gnistan II	4	(3)
2025–	Gnistan	4	(2)

International career^{‡}
2025	Finland U16	5	(6)
2026–	Finland U17	10	(5)
- * Club domestic league appearances and goals as of 17 November 2026 ‡ National team caps and goals as of 17 November 2026

Kosmo Launiala (born 4 March 2010) is a Finnish professional footballer who plays as a forward for Veikkausliiga club Gnistan.
