= 2027 UEFA European Under-17 Championship =

2027. gada UEFA Eiropas čempionāts līdz 17 gadu vecumam

Tournament details
- Host country: Latvia
- Teams: 8 (from 1 confederation)

The 2027 UEFA European Under-17 Championship will be the 24th edition of the UEFA European Under-17 Championship (43rd edition if the Under-16 era is also included), the annual international youth football championship organised by UEFA for the men's under-17 national teams of Europe. Latvia, which were selected by UEFA on 26 September 2023, will host the tournament.

A total of eight teams will play in the tournament, with players born on or after 1 January 2010 eligible to participate.

The tournament and its qualification will act as the UEFA qualifiers for the FIFA U-17 World Cup. The top teams will qualify for the 2027 FIFA U-17 World Cup in Qatar as the UEFA representatives.

== Qualification ==
=== Qualified teams ===
The following teams qualified for the final tournament.

Note: All appearance statistics include only U-17 era (since 2002).

Team	Qualification method	Date of qualification	Appearance(s)				Previous best performance (Note: Bold text indicates they hosted that edition.)
Team	Qualification method	Date of qualification	Total	First	Last	Streak	Previous best performance
Latvia	Host nation	26 September 2023	1st	Debut			
	Round 2 Group A1 winners						
	Round 2 Group A2 winners						
	Round 2 Group A3 winners						
	Round 2 Group A4 winners						
	Round 2 Group A5 winners						
	Round 2 Group A6 winners						
	Round 2 Group A7 winners						

== Venues ==
Five venues were mentioned in the application for hosting the tournament by the Latvian FA.

Riga			2027 UEFA European Under-17 Championship is located in Latvia	Jelgava	Jūrmala
Skonto Stadium	Daugava Stadium	LNK Sports Park	2027 UEFA European Under-17 Championship is located in Latvia	Zemgale Olympic Center	Sloka Stadium
Capacity: 6,747	Capacity: 10,461	Capacity: 1,674	2027 UEFA European Under-17 Championship is located in Latvia	Capacity: 1,560	Capacity: 2,500
