= 2007 UEFA European Under-17 Championship =

2007 UEFA Under-17 Championship
Europees kampioenschap voetbal onder 17 – 2007 Championnat d'Europe de football des moins de 17 ans 2007 U-17-Fußball-Europameisterschaft 2007

Tournament details
- Host country: Belgium
- Dates: 2–13 May
- Teams: 8

Final positions
- Champions: Spain (7th title)
- Runners-up: England

Tournament statistics
- Matches played: 16
- Goals scored: 47 (2.94 per match)
- Attendance: 19,957 (1,247 per match)
- Top scorer(s): (England) Victor Moses (Germany) Toni Kroos (3 goals each)
- Best player: (Spain) Bojan

The UEFA European Under-17 Championship 2007 Final Tournament was held in Belgium from 2 to 13 May 2007. Top-five teams (two best places from each group plus winner of playoff between third-placed teams) qualified for the FIFA U-17 World Cup 2007. Players born after 1 January 1990 could participate in this competition.

== Qualifications ==
There were separate rounds of qualifications being held before the Final Tournament.

1. 2007 UEFA European Under-17 Championship qualifying round
2. 2007 UEFA European Under-17 Championship elite round

== Venues ==
Belgium
Ronse	Tubize	Eupen
Orphale Cruckestadion	Stade Leburton	Kehrwegstadion
Capacity: 5,021	Capacity: 8,100	Capacity: 8,363
2007 UEFA European Under-17 Championship is located in Belgium
Tournai	Visé	Verviers
Stade Luc Varenne	Stade de la Cité de l'Oie	Stade de Bielmont
Capacity: 7,552	Capacity: 5,400	Capacity: 4,300

== Teams ==
- Belgium (host)
- England
- France
- Germany
- Iceland
- Netherlands
- Spain
- Ukraine

== Match Officials ==
A total of 6 referees, 8 assistant referees and 2 fourth officials were appointed for the final tournament.

Referees

- (Northern Ireland) Alan Black
- (Italy) Andrea de Marco
- (Serbia) Dejan Filipovic
- (Czech Republic) Jan Jílek
- (Georgia (country)) Giorgi Vadachkoria
- (Turkey) Bülent Yıldırım

Assistant referees

- (Finland) Jan-Peter Aravirta
- (Moldova) Andrei Bodean
- (Malta) Alan Camilleri
- (North Macedonia) Nikolai Karakolev
- (Latvia) Arnis Lemkins
- (Poland) Radoslaw Siejka
- (Sweden) Magnus Sjöblom
- (Hungary) Zsolt Attila Szpisjak

Fourth officials

- (Belgium) Karim Saadouni
- (Belgium) Gaëtan Simon

== Group stage ==
=== Group A ===
Teams	GP	W	D	L	GF	GA	GD	Pts
Spain	3	2	1	0	5	1	+4	7
France	3	1	1	1	4	5	−1	4
Germany	3	1	1	1	3	2	+1	4
Ukraine	3	0	1	2	3	7	−4	1

2 May 2007
16:00 CET

France	0–2	Spain
	Report	Falque 19'; Mérida 73'

Stade de Bielmont, Verviers
Attendance: 2,325
Referee: Dejan Filipović (Serbia)
2 May 2007
18:00 CET

Germany	2–0	Ukraine
Bigalke 25' (pen.); Kroos 77'	Report

Kehrweg Stadion, Eupen
Attendance: 2,018
Referee: George Vadachkoria (Georgia)

4 May 2007
16:00 CET

Spain	3–1	Ukraine
Camacho 31'; Falque 62'; Aquino 69'	Report	Shevchuk 80+1'

Stade de la Cité de l'Oie, Visé
Attendance: 583
Referee: Jan Jílek (Czech Republic)
4 May 2007
18:30 CET

France	2–1	Germany
Le Tallec 56', 71'	Report	Kroos 24'

Kehrweg Stadion, Eupen
Attendance: 2,800
Referee: Bülent Yıldırım (Turkey)

7 May 2007
15:30 CET

Ukraine	2–2	France
Karnoza 51'; Korkishko 77'	Report	M'Vila 10'; Bourgeois 44'

Stade de Bielmont, Verviers
Attendance: 100
Referee: Alan Black (Northern Ireland)
7 May 2007
15:30 CET

Spain	0–0	Germany
	Report

Kehrweg Stadion, Eupen
Attendance: 2,469
Referee: Andrea de Marco (Italy)

=== Group B ===
Teams	GP	W	D	L	GF	GA	GD	Pts
England	3	2	1	0	7	3	+4	7
Belgium	3	1	2	0	8	4	+4	5
Netherlands	3	1	1	1	7	6	+1	4
Iceland	3	0	0	3	1	10	−9	0

2 May 2007
16:00 CET

Iceland	0–2	England
	Report	Pearce 4'; Rose 24'

Orphale Crucke Stadium, Ronse
Attendance: 200
Referee: Jan Jílek (Czech Republic)
2 May 2007
18:00 CET

Netherlands	2–2	Belgium
Barazite 44'; Wijnaldum 77'	Report	De Pauw 3'; Hazard 57' (pen.)

Stade Leburton, Tubize
Attendance: 1,950
Referee: Andrea de Marco (Italy)

4 May 2007
16:00 CET

Belgium	1–1	England
Ringoot 42'	Report	Murphy 27'

Stade Luc Varenne, Tournai
Attendance: 1,094
Referee: Dejan Filipović (Serbia)
4 May 2007
20:15 CET

Netherlands	3–0	Iceland
Blind 23', 52'; Vejinović 79'	Report

Orphale Crucke Stadium, Ronse
Attendance: 380
Referee: Alan Black (Northern Ireland)

7 May 2007
17:30 CET

England	4–2	Netherlands
Lansbury 9'; Moses 15', 54'; Plummer 80+2'	Report	Narsingh 31'; Pedro 44'

Stade Leburton, Tubize
Attendance: 988
Referee: Bülent Yıldırım (Turkey)
7 May 2007
17:30 CET

Belgium	5–1	Iceland
Kis 15', 68' (pen.); De Pauw 48'; Benteke 55'; Ringoot 58'	Report	Sigþórsson 19'

Stade Luc Varenne, Tournai
Attendance: 1,134
Referee: George Vadachkoria (Georgia)

== Knockout stage ==
=== 5th place playoff ===
10 May 2007
18:00 CET

Germany	3–2	Netherlands
Kroos 18'; Sukuta-Pasu 61', 76'	Report	Van Aanholt 31'; Vejinović 38'

Stade de la Cité de l'Oie, Visé
Attendance: 500
Referee: Andrea de Marco (Italy)

=== Semi-finals ===
10 May 2007
17:30 CET

Spain	1–1	Belgium
Bojan 72'	Report	Rochela 63' (o.g.)
Penalties
Vitoria (penalty missed); Mérida (penalty scored); Bojan (penalty scored); Rochela (penalty scored); Aquino (penalty scored); Porcar (penalty scored); Forner (penalty scored); Camacho (penalty scored)	7–6	(penalty scored) De Pauw; (penalty scored) Spruyt; (penalty scored) Zevne; (penalty scored) Hazard; (penalty missed) Aquino; (penalty scored) Phiri; (penalty scored) Geurden; (penalty missed) Daeseleire

Stade Luc Varenne, Tournai
Attendance: 1,150
Referee: Jan Jílek (Czech Republic)

10 May 2007
20:15 CET

England	1–0	France
Moses 11'	Report

Stade Leburton, Tubize
Attendance: 1,166
Referee: Bülent Yıldırım (Turkey)

=== Final ===
13 May 2007
17:45 CET

Spain	1–0	England
Bojan 48'	Report

Stade Luc Varenne, Tournai
Attendance: 1,100
Referee: Dejan Filipović (Serbia)

== Goalscorers ==
3 goals

- (England) Victor Moses
- (Germany) Toni Kroos

2 goals

- (Belgium) Kevin Kis
- (Belgium) Nill De Pauw
- (Belgium) Niels Ringoot
- (France) Thibault Bourgeois
- (France) Damien Le Tallec
- (France) Yann M'Vila
- (Netherlands) Daley Blind
- (Netherlands) Marko Vejinović
- (Spain) Iago Falque
- (Spain) Bojan

1 goal

- (Belgium) Christian Benteke
- (Belgium) Eden Hazard
- (England) Henri Lansbury
- (England) Rhys Murphy
- (England) Krystian Pearce
- (England) Tristan Plummer
- (England) Danny Rose
- (Germany) Sascha Bigalke
- (Germany) Richard Sukuta-Pasu
- (Iceland) Kolbeinn Sigþórsson
- (Netherlands) Patrick van Aanholt
- (Netherlands) Nacer Barazite
- (Netherlands) Luciano Narsingh
- (Netherlands) Luis Pedro
- (Netherlands) Georginio Wijnaldum
- (Spain) Dani Aquino
- (Spain) Ignacio Camacho
- (Spain) Fran Mérida
- (Ukraine) Artur Karnoza
- (Ukraine) Dmytro Korkishko
- (Ukraine) Serhiy Shevchuk

Own goals

- (Spain) David Rochela (for Belgium)

== Golden Player ==
- (Spain) Bojan
