= 2020 UEFA European Under-17 Championship qualification =

Tournament details
- Dates: Qualifying round: 25 September – 19 November 2019; Elite round: Cancelled
- Teams: 54 (from 1 confederation)

Tournament statistics
- Matches played: 78
- Goals scored: 289 (3.71 per match)
- Top scorer(s): (France) Matthis Abline (Poland) Szymon Włodarczyk (5 goals each)
- All statistics correct as of 19 November 2019.

The 2020 UEFA European Under-17 Championship qualifying competition was a men's under-17 football competition that was originally to determine the 15 teams joining the automatically qualified hosts Estonia in the 2020 UEFA European Under-17 Championship final tournament, before being cancelled due to the COVID-19 pandemic.

Apart from Estonia, all remaining 54 UEFA member national teams entered the qualifying competition. Players born on or after 1 January 2003 are eligible to participate.

== Format ==
The qualifying competition consists of two rounds:

- Qualifying round: Apart from Spain and England, which receive byes to the elite round as the teams with the highest seeding coefficient, the remaining 52 teams are drawn into 13 groups of four teams. Each group is played in single round-robin format at one of the teams selected as hosts after the draw. The 13 group winners, the 13 runners-up, and the four third-placed teams with the best record against the first and second-placed teams in their group advance to the elite round.
- Elite round: The 32 teams are drawn into eight groups of four teams. Each group is played in single round-robin format at one of the teams selected as hosts after the draw. The eight group winners and the seven runners-up with the best record against all teams in their group qualify for the final tournament.

The schedule of each group is as follows, with two rest days between each matchday (Regulations Article 20.04):

Group schedule
Matchday	Matches
Matchday 1	1 v 4, 3 v 2
Matchday 2	1 v 3, 2 v 4
Matchday 3	2 v 1, 4 v 3

=== Tiebreakers ===
In the qualifying round and elite round, teams are ranked according to points (3 points for a win, 1 point for a draw, 0 points for a loss), and if tied on points, the following tiebreaking criteria are applied, in the order given, to determine the rankings (Regulations Articles 14.01 and 14.02):

1. Points in head-to-head matches among tied teams;
2. Goal difference in head-to-head matches among tied teams;
3. Goals scored in head-to-head matches among tied teams;
4. If more than two teams are tied, and after applying all head-to-head criteria above, a subset of teams are still tied, all head-to-head criteria above are reapplied exclusively to this subset of teams;
5. Goal difference in all group matches;
6. Goals scored in all group matches;
7. Penalty shoot-out if only two teams have the same number of points, and they met in the last round of the group and are tied after applying all criteria above (not used if more than two teams have the same number of points, or if their rankings are not relevant for qualification for the next stage);
8. Disciplinary points (red card = 3 points, yellow card = 1 point, expulsion for two yellow cards in one match = 3 points);
9. UEFA coefficient ranking for the qualifying round draw;
10. Drawing of lots.

To determine the four best third-placed teams from the qualifying round, the results against the teams in fourth place are discarded. To determine the seven best runners-up from the elite round, all results are considered. The following criteria are applied (Regulations Articles 15.01, 15.02 and 15.03):

1. Points;
2. Goal difference;
3. Goals scored;
4. Disciplinary points (total 3 matches);
5. UEFA coefficient ranking for the qualifying round draw;
6. Drawing of lots.

== Qualifying round ==
=== Draw ===
The draw for the qualifying round was held on 6 December 2018, 09:00 CET (UTC+1), at the UEFA headquarters in Nyon, Switzerland.

The teams were seeded according to their coefficient ranking, calculated based on the following:

- 2015 UEFA European Under-17 Championship final tournament and qualifying competition (qualifying round and elite round)
- 2016 UEFA European Under-17 Championship final tournament and qualifying competition (qualifying round and elite round)
- 2017 UEFA European Under-17 Championship final tournament and qualifying competition (qualifying round and elite round)
- 2018 UEFA European Under-17 Championship final tournament and qualifying competition (qualifying round and elite round)

Each group contained one team from Pot A, one team from Pot B, one team from Pot C, and one team from Pot D. Based on the decisions taken by the UEFA Emergency Panel, the following pairs of teams could not be drawn in the same group: Russia and Ukraine, Serbia and Kosovo, Bosnia and Herzegovina and Kosovo, Azerbaijan and Armenia.

Final tournament hosts
Team	Coeff.	Rank
**Estonia**	2.333	—

Bye to elite round
Team	Coeff.	Rank
Spain	25.889	1
England	25.000	2

Teams entering qualifying round

Pot A
Team	Coeff.	Rank
Germany	24.167	3
Netherlands	23.778	4
France	20.611	5
Italy	19.667	6
Belgium	19.111	7
Portugal	18.222	8
Republic of Ireland	17.167	9
Austria	14.333	10
Sweden	14.000	11
Serbia	13.778	12
Scotland	13.222	13
Russia	13.111	14
Bosnia and Herzegovina	13.000	15

Pot B
Team	Coeff.	Rank
Croatia	12.556	16
Israel	11.333	17
Hungary	11.111	18
Slovenia	10.889	19
Poland	10.833	20
Turkey	10.833	21
Ukraine	10.722	22
Norway	10.722	23
Czech Republic	10.611	24
Greece	10.556	25
Switzerland	10.111	26
Denmark	9.333	27
Slovakia	9.167	28

Pot C
Team	Coeff.	Rank
Finland	7.833	29
Azerbaijan	7.000	30
Georgia	6.833	31
Cyprus	6.833	32
Wales	6.500	33
Iceland	6.333	34
Belarus	6.167	35
Bulgaria	5.333	36
Romania	5.000	37
Northern Ireland	4.167	38
North Macedonia	3.833	39
Montenegro	3.667	40
Faroe Islands	3.222	41

Pot D
Team	Coeff.	Rank
Lithuania	2.667	42
Latvia	2.667	43
Albania	2.333	44
Armenia	2.000	45
Luxembourg	1.667	46
Moldova	1.667	47
Kazakhstan	1.000	48
Liechtenstein	1.000	49
Andorra	0.333	50
San Marino	0.333	51
Gibraltar	0.333	52
Malta	0.000	53
Kosovo	0.000	54

Notes

- Teams marked in **bold** have qualified for the final tournament.

=== Groups ===
The qualifying round must be played by 19 November 2019.

Times up to 26 October 2019 are CEST (UTC+2), thereafter times are CET (UTC+1), as listed by UEFA (local times, if different, are in parentheses).

==== Group 1 ====
Pos	Team	Pld	W	D	L	GF	GA	GD	Pts	Qualification
1	Belgium	3	2	1	0	17	3	+14	**7**	Elite round
2	Poland (H)	3	2	1	0	16	4	+12	**7**	Elite round
3	North Macedonia	3	1	0	2	7	6	+1	**3**	
4	Liechtenstein	3	0	0	3	0	27	−27	**0**	

Source: UEFA
Rules for classification: Tiebreakers
(H) Hosts
9 October 2019
15:30

Belgium	12–0	Liechtenstein
Descotte 22', 45+2', 46', 48'; El Gharbi 31', 36'; De Wilde 61', 71'; Eeckhout 69'; Mbangula Tshifunda 77'; Calut 80' (pen.); Dwomoh 84'	Report

OSiR Włocławek, Włocławek
Referee: Suren Baliyan (Armenia)
9 October 2019
15:30

North Macedonia	2–3	Poland
Gjorgoski 19'; Saitoski 87'	Report	Balcewicz 29'; Kusztal 63'; Kozłowski 70'

Stadion Miejski, Toruń
Referee: Paul Mclaughlin (Republic of Ireland)

12 October 2019
11:00

Belgium	3–1	North Macedonia
Oyen 26'; Mbangula Tshifunda 53'; Olaigbe 55'	Report	Saitoski 73'

Stadion Miejski im. Inowrocławskich Olimpijczyków, Inowrocław
Referee: Matthew De Gabriele (Malta)
12 October 2019
15:30

Poland	11–0	Liechtenstein
Włodarczyk 2', 6', 17', 40', 43'; Mosór 22'; Kusztal 28'; Kozłowski 34', 45+2'; Wasilewski 56', 75'	Report

Stadion Miejski im. Inowrocławskich Olimpijczyków, Inowrocław
Referee: Suren Baliyan (Armenia)

15 October 2019
15:30

Poland	2–2	Belgium
Mosór 61'; Matuła 84'	Report	Engwanda Ongena 20'; Olaigbe 59' (pen.)

OSiR Włocławek, Włocławek
Referee: Paul Mclaughlin (Republic of Ireland)
15 October 2019
15:30

Liechtenstein	0–4	North Macedonia
	Report	Taipi 36'; Feta 45+3'; Saitoski 50', 89'

Stadion Miejski, Toruń
Referee: Matthew De Gabriele (Malta)

==== Group 2 ====
Pos	Team	Pld	W	D	L	GF	GA	GD	Pts	Qualification
1	Italy	3	3	0	0	12	0	+12	**9**	Elite round
2	Turkey	3	2	0	1	8	5	+3	**6**	Elite round
3	Northern Ireland	3	1	0	2	7	6	+1	**3**	
4	Luxembourg (H)	3	0	0	3	1	17	−16	**0**	

Source: UEFA
Rules for classification: Tiebreakers
(H) Hosts
24 October 2019
19:00

Italy	6–0	Luxembourg
Magazzù 9'; Rossi 39'; Monteiro de Oliveira 53' (o.g.); Baldanzi 58'; Rosa 72'; Cepele 90+2'	Report

Stade Municipal, Rumelange
Referee: Kári Jóannesarson Á Høvdanum (Faroe Islands)
24 October 2019
19:00

Northern Ireland	0–4	Turkey
	Report	Beyaz 3', 37'; Dibek 34'; Demirel 59'

Stade rue Henri Dunant, Beggen
Referee: Marcel Birsan (Romania)

27 October 2019
19:00

Italy	2–0	Northern Ireland
Rossi 11'; Magazzù 45'	Report

Stade Municipal, Rumelange
Referee: Admir Šehović (Bosnia and Herzegovina)
27 October 2019
19:00

Turkey	4–1	Luxembourg
Demirel 16', 88'; Kaplan 52'; Beyaz 77'	Report	Dzogovic 34'

Stade John Grün, Mondorf-les-Bains
Referee: Kári Jóannesarson Á Høvdanum (Faroe Islands)

30 October 2019
19:00

Turkey	0–4	Italy
	Report	Magazzù 16'; Miretti 39', 54'; Cepele 41'

Stade John Grün, Mondorf-les-Bains
Referee: Marcel Birsan (Romania)
30 October 2019
19:00

Luxembourg	0–7	Northern Ireland
	Report	McAllister 1', 30' (pen.); Stewart 9'; McCausland 12'; McGuckin 45+1'; Rossler 60' (o.g.); Allen 69'

Stade rue Henri Dunant, Beggen
Referee: Admir Šehović (Bosnia and Herzegovina)

==== Group 3 ====
Pos	Team	Pld	W	D	L	GF	GA	GD	Pts	Qualification
1	Republic of Ireland (H)	3	3	0	0	13	3	+10	**9**	Elite round
2	Montenegro	3	1	0	2	3	4	−1	**3 (Note: Tied on head-to-head points (3). Ranked on head-to-head goal difference: Montenegro +1, Israel 0, Andorra −1.)**	Elite round
3	Israel	3	1	0	2	3	5	−2	**3**	Elite round
4	Andorra	3	1	0	2	1	8	−7	**3**	

Source: UEFA
Rules for classification: Tiebreakers
(H) Hosts
Notes:
12 November 2019
16:00 (15:00 GMT)

Montenegro	0–1	Israel
	Report	Yifrah 7'

St Colman's Park, Cobh
Referee: Mario Zebec (Croatia)
12 November 2019
20:30 (19:30 GMT)

Republic of Ireland	6–0	Andorra
Mahon 3'; Del Pozo 22' (o.g.); Ferguson 24', 28'; Conroy 71'; Kavanagh 77'	Report

Turners Cross, Cork
Referee: Aleksei Matyunin (Russia)

15 November 2019
16:00 (15:00 GMT)

Israel	0–1	Andorra
	Report	Rodrigues 73'

St Colman's Park, Cobh
Referee: Aleksei Matyunin (Russia)
15 November 2019
20:30 (19:30 GMT)

Republic of Ireland	3–1	Montenegro
McCormack 57', 81'; Garcia McNulty 65'	Report	Bakić 58'

Turners Cross, Cork
Referee: Ferenc Karakó (Hungary)

18 November 2019
15:00 (14:00 GMT)

Israel	2–4	Republic of Ireland
Shafiki 52'; Turgeman 87'	Report	O'Neill 17'; Garcia McNulty 45'; Armstrong 50'; Ferguson 62'

Turners Cross, Cork
Referee: Mario Zebec (Croatia)
18 November 2019
15:00 (14:00 GMT)

Andorra	0–2	Montenegro
	Report	Dašić 83'; Vukotić 90+3'

St Colman's Park, Cobh
Referee: Ferenc Karakó (Hungary)

==== Group 4 ====
Pos	Team	Pld	W	D	L	GF	GA	GD	Pts	Qualification
1	Denmark	3	3	0	0	17	3	+14	**9**	Elite round
2	Sweden (H)	3	2	0	1	7	7	0	**6**	Elite round
3	Lithuania	3	1	0	2	7	11	−4	**3**	
4	Faroe Islands	3	0	0	3	2	12	−10	**0**	

Source: UEFA
Rules for classification: Tiebreakers
(H) Hosts
27 September 2019
16:00

Sweden	4–2	Lithuania
Andersson 45' (pen.), 78'; Wilhelmsson 60'; Mattsson 64'	Report	Jarusevičius 39'; Spyčius 52'

Harlyckans IP, Helsingborg
Referee: Yigal Frid (Israel)
27 September 2019
16:00

Faroe Islands	1–6	Denmark
Kallsberg 69'	Report	Rasmussen 30'; Faghir 35', 88'; Bredahl 48'; Vick 55'; Andersen 89'

Laröds IP, Helsingborg
Referee: Rahim Hasanov (Azerbaijan)

30 September 2019
16:00

Denmark	6–1	Lithuania
Højlund 3'; Lind 37' (pen.); Faghir 75'; Randolf 78'; Dall 83'; Jensen 90'	Report	Buzas 61'

Laröds IP, Helsingborg
Referee: Dragan Petrović (Bosnia and Herzegovina)
30 September 2019
16:00

Sweden	2–0	Faroe Islands
Nåvik 30'; Wilhelmsson 76'	Report

Harlyckans IP, Helsingborg
Referee: Yigal Frid (Israel)

3 October 2019
16:00

Denmark	5–1	Sweden
Bredahl 23', 32'; Panjeskovic 45'; Faghir 49'; Dall 81'	Report	Andersson 6'

Harlyckans IP, Helsingborg
Referee: Dragan Petrović (Bosnia and Herzegovina)
3 October 2019
16:00

Lithuania	4–1	Faroe Islands
Slivka 21'; Jarusevičius 45+1', 90+1' (pen.); Dzinga 69'	Report	Hansen 56'

Laröds IP, Helsingborg
Referee: Rahim Hasanov (Azerbaijan)

==== Group 5 ====
Pos	Team	Pld	W	D	L	GF	GA	GD	Pts	Qualification
1	France	3	3	0	0	12	0	+12	**9**	Elite round
2	Slovakia	3	2	0	1	12	3	+9	**6**	Elite round
3	Cyprus (H)	3	1	0	2	3	5	−2	**3**	
4	Gibraltar	3	0	0	3	1	20	−19	**0**	

Source: UEFA
Rules for classification: Tiebreakers
(H) Hosts
22 October 2019
14:00 (1500 EEST)

France	8–0	Gibraltar
Ben Seghir 13'; Tchaouna 16' (pen.), 47'; Mejbri 49', 55'; Gourna Douath 60'; Abline 67', 86' (pen.)	Report

Sotira Municipal Stadium, Sotira
Referee: Juxhin Xhaja (Albania)
22 October 2019
14:00 (15:00 EEST)

Cyprus	0–3	Slovakia
	Report	Kotlár 41' (pen.); Jambor 45+5' (pen.); Macejko 90+7'

GSZ Stadium, Larnaca
Referee: Kai Erik Steen (Norway)

25 October 2019
14:00 (15:00 EEST)

France	2–0	Cyprus
Abline 42', 79'	Report

GSZ Stadium, Larnaca
Referee: Robert Ian Jenkins (Wales)
25 October 2019
14:00 (15:00 EEST)

Slovakia	9–1	Gibraltar
Jambor 3' (pen.); Veliký 18', 74'; Szalma 41'; Urgela 45'; Božík 76'; Šmatlák 85'; Kotlár 90+1' (pen.); Čongrády 90+3'	Report	Zammitt-Agius 28'

Sotira Municipal Stadium, Sotira
Referee: Juxhin Xhaja (Albania)

28 October 2019
14:00 (15:00 EET)

Slovakia	0–2	France
	Report	Abline 25'; Tramoni 90+3'

Sotira Municipal Stadium, Sotira
Referee: Kai Erik Steen (Norway)
28 October 2019
14:00 (15:00 EET)

Gibraltar	0–3	Cyprus
	Report	Georgiou 35'; Kostis 39'; Loizou 78'

GSZ Stadium, Larnaca
Referee: Robert Ian Jenkins (Wales)

==== Group 6 ====
Pos	Team	Pld	W	D	L	GF	GA	GD	Pts	Qualification
1	Hungary	3	1	2	0	3	0	+3	**5**	Elite round
2	Serbia	3	1	1	1	3	3	0	**4 (Note: Ranked on head-to-head points: Serbia 3, Belarus 0.)**	Elite round
3	Belarus (H)	3	1	1	1	2	2	0	**4**	Elite round
4	Latvia	3	1	0	2	2	5	−3	**3**	

Source: UEFA
Rules for classification: Tiebreakers
(H) Hosts
Notes:
24 October 2019
11:00 (12:00 FET)

Serbia	1–2	Latvia
Krstić 83'	Report	Fjodorovs 13'; Kaušelis 69'

Dinamo Stadium, Minsk
Attendance: 80
Referee: Nicholas Walsh (Scotland)
24 October 2019
14:00 (15:00 FET)

Belarus	0–0	Hungary
	Report

Traktor Stadium, Minsk
Attendance: 270
Referee: Nicolas Laforge (Belgium)

27 October 2019
10:00 (12:00 FET)

Hungary	3–0	Latvia
Németh 54' (pen.); Fjodorovs 56' (o.g.); Bakos 90+3' (pen.)	Report

Torpedo Stadium, Zhodzina
Attendance: 111
Referee: Barbeno Luca (San Marino)
27 October 2019
13:00 (15:00 FET)

Serbia	2–1	Belarus
Krstić 39', 44'	Report	Zinovich 15'

Traktor Stadium, Minsk
Attendance: 250
Referee: Nicholas Walsh (Scotland)

30 October 2019
13:00 (15:00 FET)

Hungary	0–0	Serbia
	Report

Dinamo Stadium, Minsk
Attendance: 50
Referee: Nicolas Laforge (Belgium)
30 October 2019
13:00 (15:00 FET)

Latvia	0–1	Belarus
	Report	Kuznetsov 88'

Traktor Stadium, Minsk
Attendance: 200
Referee: Barbeno Luca (San Marino)

==== Group 7 ====
Pos	Team	Pld	W	D	L	GF	GA	GD	Pts	Qualification
1	Croatia	3	3	0	0	9	3	+6	**9**	Elite round
2	Scotland (H)	3	2	0	1	5	3	+2	**6**	Elite round
3	Armenia	3	1	0	2	1	6	−5	**3**	
4	Iceland	3	0	0	3	3	6	−3	**0**	

Source: UEFA
Rules for classification: Tiebreakers
(H) Hosts
22 October 2019
13:00 (12:00 BST)

Iceland	2–3	Croatia
Óskarsson 40'; Djuric 84' (pen.)	Report	Barišić 9'; Ćubelić 17'; Petrović 77'

Oriam outdoor, Edinburgh
Referee: Michal Ocenáš (Slovakia)
22 October 2019
19:00 (18:00 BST)

Scotland	2–0	Armenia
Mochrie 8'; Fairley 58'	Report

Forthbank Stadium, Stirling
Referee: Dejan Jakimovski (North Macedonia)

25 October 2019
13:00 (12:00 BST)

Croatia	4–0	Armenia
Duvnjak 1'; Barišić 9', 71'; Bilić 64'	Report

Oriam outdoor, Edinburgh
Referee: Dejan Jakimovski (North Macedonia)
25 October 2019
19:00 (18:00 BST)

Scotland	2–1	Iceland
Morrison 31', 70'	Report	Djuric 19'

Forthbank Stadium, Stirling
Referee: Genc Nuza (Kosovo)

28 October 2019
20:05 (19:05 GMT)

Croatia	2–1	Scotland
Kanižaj 69'; Šaranić 90+1'	Report	Hanratty 75' (pen.)

Forthbank Stadium, Stirling
Referee: Michal Ocenáš (Slovakia)
28 October 2019
20:05 (19:05 GMT)

Armenia	1–0	Iceland
Hakobyan 37'	Report

Oriam outdoor, Edinburgh
Referee: Genc Nuza (Kosovo)

==== Group 8 ====
Pos	Team	Pld	W	D	L	GF	GA	GD	Pts	Qualification
1	Ukraine	3	2	1	0	4	0	+4	**7**	Elite round
2	Portugal (H)	3	1	2	0	4	0	+4	**5**	Elite round
3	Georgia	3	0	2	1	0	2	−2	**2**	Elite round
4	Albania	3	0	1	2	0	6	−6	**1**	

Source: UEFA
Rules for classification: Tiebreakers
(H) Hosts
13 November 2019
16:00 (15:00 WET)

Portugal	4–0	Albania
Ferreira 26'; Nabian 36'; Fernandes 53'; Resende 87'	Report

Estádio do Fontelo, Viseu
Referee: Boris Marhefka (Slovakia)
13 November 2019
16:00 (15:00 WET)

Georgia	0–2	Ukraine
	Report	Voloshyn 51'; Ocheretko 76'

Estádio Municipal de Mangualde, Mangualde
Referee: Daniyar Sakhi (Kazakhstan)

16 November 2019
16:00 (15:00 WET)

Ukraine	2–0	Albania
Shostak 57'; Mampasi 84'	Report

Estádio Municipal de Nelas, Nelas
Referee: Boris Marhefka (Slovakia)
16 November 2019
18:00 (17:00 WET)

Portugal	0–0	Georgia
	Report

Estádio João Cardoso, Tondela
Referee: Kaspar Sjöberg (Sweden)

19 November 2019
16:00 (15:00 WET)

Ukraine	0–0	Portugal
	Report

Estádio do Fontelo, Viseu
Referee: Kaspar Sjöberg (Sweden)
19 November 2019
16:00 (15:00 WET)

Albania	0–0	Georgia
	Report

Estádio Municipal de Mangualde, Mangualde
Referee: Daniyar Sakhi (Kazakhstan)

==== Group 9 ====
Pos	Team	Pld	W	D	L	GF	GA	GD	Pts	Qualification
1	Greece (H)	3	3	0	0	13	2	+11	**9**	Elite round
2	Germany	3	2	0	1	7	2	+5	**6**	Elite round
3	Kazakhstan	3	1	0	2	3	10	−7	**3**	
4	Azerbaijan	3	0	0	3	1	10	−9	**0**	

Source: UEFA
Rules for classification: Tiebreakers
(H) Hosts
13 November 2019
13:00 (14:00 EET)

Germany	5–0	Kazakhstan
Rhein 10', 27'; Çalhanoğlu 15'; Netz 74'; Schmidt 77'	Report

Pampeloponnisiako Stadium, Patras
Referee: Alexandru Tean (Moldova)
13 November 2019
14:00 (15:00 EET)

Azerbaijan	1–6	Greece
Vardar 62' (pen.)	Report	Liatsos 36' (pen.), 84'; Koutsias 44'; Kitsakis 45+1'; Christopoulos 74'; Syrmis 90+5'

Papacharalambio Ethniko Stadium, Nafpaktos
Referee: Ondrej Pechanec (Czech Republic)

16 November 2019
13:00 (14:00 EET)

Germany	2–0	Azerbaijan
Rhein 30'; Çalhanoğlu 53'	Report

Pampeloponnisiako Stadium, Patras
Referee: Denys Shurman (Ukraine)
16 November 2019
14:00 (15:00 EET)

Greece	5–1	Kazakhstan
Liatsos 5' (pen.), 81'; Koutsias 48'; Kitsos 86'; Christopoulos 90+3'	Report	Azatov 77'

Papacharalambio Ethniko Stadium, Nafpaktos
Referee: Alexandru Tean (Moldova)

19 November 2019
13:00 (14:00 EET)

Greece	2–0	Germany
Koutsias 65', 84'	Report

Papacharalambio Ethniko Stadium, Nafpaktos
Referee: Ondrej Pechanec (Czech Republic)
19 November 2019
13:00 (14:00 EET)

Kazakhstan	2–0	Azerbaijan
Kushkumbayev 3'; Rakhimzhanov 85'	Report

Pampeloponnisiako Stadium, Patras
Referee: Denys Shurman (Ukraine)

==== Group 10 ====
Pos	Team	Pld	W	D	L	GF	GA	GD	Pts	Qualification
1	Russia	3	2	0	1	9	2	+7	**6 (Note: Tiebreakers among three teams – Tied on head-to-head points (3), goal difference (0). Ranked on head-to-head goals scored: Russia 2, Switzerland 2, Romania 1.; Tiebreakers between Russia and Switzerland – Ranked on head-to-head points: Russia 3, Switzerland 0.)**	Elite round
2	Switzerland	3	2	0	1	9	2	+7	**6**	Elite round
3	Romania (H)	3	2	0	1	7	1	+6	**6**	Elite round
4	San Marino	3	0	0	3	0	20	−20	**0**	

Source: UEFA
Rules for classification: Tiebreakers
(H) Hosts
Notes:
24 October 2019
14:00 (15:00 EEST)

Russia	7–0	San Marino
Zakharyan 11'; Sokolov 12'; Shitov 44'; Abdusalamov 77', 79', 84' (pen.); Levin 86'	Report

Stadionul CNAF, Buftea
Referee: Jason Barcelo (Gibraltar)
24 October 2019
18:00 (19:00 EEST)

Romania	0–1	Switzerland
	Report	Fink 37'

Stadionul Mogoșoaia, Mogoșoaia
Referee: Aleksandrs Anufrijevs (Latvia)

27 October 2019
14:00 (15:00 EET)

Switzerland	7–0	San Marino
Rossier 3', 60'; Owusu 23'; Fink 52'; Ribeiro 70', 71'; Hunziker 82'	Report

Stadionul CNAF, Buftea
Referee: Jason Barcelo (Gibraltar)
27 October 2019
18:00 (19:00 EET)

Russia	0–1	Romania
	Report	Pandele 68'

Stadionul Mogoșoaia, Mogoșoaia
Referee: Nejc Kajtazovic (Slovenia)

30 October 2019
17:00 (18:00 EET)

Switzerland	1–2	Russia
Fink 31'	Report	Sokolov 53' (pen.), 64'

Stadionul CNAF, Buftea
Referee: Aleksandrs Anufrijevs (Latvia)
30 October 2019
17:00 (18:00 EET)

San Marino	0–6	Romania
	Report	Bodisteanu 19'; Lazar 25'; Andronache 30'; Malaele 31', 45+1'; Negoescu 88'

Stadionul Mogoșoaia, Mogoșoaia
Referee: Nejc Kajtazovic (Slovenia)

==== Group 11 ====
Pos	Team	Pld	W	D	L	GF	GA	GD	Pts	Qualification
1	Finland (H)	3	2	1	0	5	1	+4	**7**	Elite round
2	Czech Republic	3	1	2	0	4	1	+3	**5**	Elite round
3	Bosnia and Herzegovina	3	1	0	2	5	6	−1	**3**	
4	Moldova	3	0	1	2	0	6	−6	**1**	

Source: UEFA
Rules for classification: Tiebreakers
(H) Hosts
25 September 2019
12:00 (13:00 EEST)

Bosnia and Herzegovina	3–0	Moldova
Alijagić 28' (pen.), 49'; Musić 62'	Report

Keskusliikuntapuisto, Kaarina
Referee: Loukas Sotiriou (Cyprus)
25 September 2019
15:30 (16:30 EEST)

Finland	0–0	Czech Republic
	Report

Salom Urheilupuisto, Salo
Referee: Nathan Verboomen (Belgium)

28 September 2019
12:00 (13:00 EEST)

Bosnia and Herzegovina	1–2	Finland
Alijagić 44'	Report	Walta 24', 70'

Keskusliikuntapuisto, Kaarina
Referee: Tim Marshall (Northern Ireland)
28 September 2019
15:30 (16:30 EEST)

Czech Republic	0–0	Moldova
	Report

Centralidrottsplan, Pargas
Referee: Loukas Sotiriou (Cyprus)

1 October 2019
15:30 (16:30 EEST)

Czech Republic	4–1	Bosnia and Herzegovina
Uriča 24'; Vecheta 42'; Vitík 52'; Šíp 54'	Report	Mehičević 86'

Salom Urheilupuisto, Salo
Referee: Nathan Verboomen (Belgium)
1 October 2019
15:30 (16:30 EEST)

Moldova	0–3	Finland
	Report	Pyyhtiä 20'; Paananen 28'; Terho 37'

Centralidrottsplan, Pargas
Referee: Tim Marshall (Northern Ireland)

==== Group 12 ====
Pos	Team	Pld	W	D	L	GF	GA	GD	Pts	Qualification
1	Netherlands (H)	3	2	1	0	4	2	+2	**7**	Elite round
2	Wales	3	2	0	1	6	3	+3	**6**	Elite round
3	Slovenia	3	1	0	2	2	2	0	**3**	
4	Kosovo	3	0	1	2	2	7	−5	**1**	

Source: UEFA
Rules for classification: Tiebreakers
(H) Hosts
9 October 2019
16:00

Wales	1–0	Slovenia
Williams 90+2'	Report

Sportpark Parkzicht, Uden
Referee: Lionel Tschudi (Switzerland)
9 October 2019
19:00

Netherlands	1–1	Kosovo
Jimenez 10'	Report	Hana 69'

De Wieën, Venray
Referee: Kristoffer Hagenes (Norway)

12 October 2019
13:00

Slovenia	2–0	Kosovo
Šeško 12'; Zajšek 86'	Report

De Wieën, Venray
Referee: Kristoffer Hagenes (Norway)
12 October 2019
16:00

Netherlands	2–1	Wales
Simons 50'; Barasi 79'	Report	Viggars 41' (pen.)

Sportpark Parkzicht, Uden
Referee: Milovan Milačić (Montenegro)

15 October 2019
19:00

Slovenia	0–1	Netherlands
	Report	Hoogewerf 55'

De Wieën, Venray
Referee: Lionel Tschudi (Switzerland)
15 October 2019
19:00

Kosovo	1–4	Wales
Ademi 81'	Report	Baker 16'; Dackers 33'; Higgins 44'; Edwards 88'

Sportpark Parkzicht, Uden
Referee: Milovan Milačić (Montenegro)

==== Group 13 ====
Pos	Team	Pld	W	D	L	GF	GA	GD	Pts	Qualification
1	Austria	3	3	0	0	11	1	+10	**9**	Elite round
2	Norway (H)	3	2	0	1	10	2	+8	**6**	Elite round
3	Bulgaria	3	1	0	2	6	6	0	**3**	
4	Malta	3	0	0	3	0	18	−18	**0**	

Source: UEFA
Rules for classification: Tiebreakers
(H) Hosts
17 October 2019
13:00

Austria	6–0	Malta
Demir 13'; Wallner 18'; Kanuric 33'; Havel 37'; Barlov 83'; Coco 90+2'	Report

Briskeby Arena, Hamar
Referee: Luis Teixeira (Andorra)
17 October 2019
17:30

Bulgaria	1–2	Norway
Smolenski 78'	Report	Gulliksen 63' (pen.); Bauer 90+3'

Briskeby Arena, Hamar
Referee: Ümit Öztürk (Turkey)

20 October 2019
13:00

Austria	4–1	Bulgaria
Coco 41'; Demir 51'; Wydra 58'; Kanuric 88'	Report	Krastev 38'

Nammo Stadion, Raufoss
Referee: Helgi Mikael Jónasson (Iceland)
20 October 2019
17:30

Norway	8–0	Malta
Fiabema 1', 26', 32'; Gulliksen 7', 58', 68'; Arnstad 24'; Bauer 40'	Report

Nammo Stadion, Raufoss
Referee: Luis Teixeira (Andorra)

23 October 2019
17:00

Norway	0–1	Austria
	Report	Demir 70'

Briskeby Arena, Hamar
Referee: Ümit Öztürk (Turkey)
23 October 2019
17:00

Malta	0–4	Bulgaria
	Report	Bonev 37'; Smolenski 69', 88'; Tsonchev 90+1'

Nammo Stadion, Raufoss
Referee: Helgi Mikael Jónasson (Iceland)

=== Ranking of third-placed teams ===
To determine the four best third-placed teams from the qualifying round which advance to the elite round, only the results of the third-placed teams against the first and second-placed teams in their group are taken into account.

Pos	Grp	Team	Pld	W	D	L	GF	GA	GD	Pts	Qualification
1	10	Romania	2	1	0	1	1	1	0	3	Elite round
2	3	Israel	2	1	0	1	3	4	−1	3	Elite round
3	6	Belarus	2	0	1	1	1	2	−1	1	Elite round
4	8	Georgia	2	0	1	1	0	2	−2	1	Elite round
5	12	Slovenia	2	0	0	2	0	2	−2	0	
6	1	North Macedonia	2	0	0	2	3	6	−3	0	
7	11	Bosnia and Herzegovina	2	0	0	2	2	6	−4	0 (Note: Tied on disciplinary points (−4). Ranked on coefficient ranking: Bosnia and Herzegovina 15, Bulgaria 36.)	
8	13	Bulgaria	2	0	0	2	2	6	−4	0	
9	5	Cyprus	2	0	0	2	0	5	−5	0	
10	2	Northern Ireland	2	0	0	2	0	6	−6	0 (Note: Tied on disciplinary points (−6). Ranked on coefficient ranking: Northern Ireland 38, Armenia 45.)	
11	7	Armenia	2	0	0	2	0	6	−6	0	
12	4	Lithuania	2	0	0	2	3	10	−7	0	
13	9	Kazakhstan	2	0	0	2	1	10	−9	0	

Source: UEFA
Rules for classification: 1) points; 2) goal difference; 3) goals scored; 4) disciplinary points; 5) coefficient ranking; 6) drawing of lots.

== Elite round ==
=== Draw ===
The draw for the elite round was held on 3 December 2019, 12:45 CET (UTC+1), at the UEFA headquarters in Nyon, Switzerland.

The teams were seeded according to their results in the qualifying round. Spain and England, which received byes to the elite round, were automatically seeded into Pot A. Each group contained one team from Pot A, one team from Pot B, one team from Pot C, and one team from Pot D. Winners and runners-up from the same qualifying round group could not be drawn in the same group, but the best third-placed teams could be drawn in the same group as winners or runners-up from the same qualifying round group. Based on the decisions taken by the UEFA Emergency Panel, Russia and Ukraine could not be drawn in the same group.

Pos	Grp	Team	Pld	W	D	L	GF	GA	GD	Pts	Seeding
1	—	Spain	0	0	0	0	0	0	0	0	Pot A
2	—	England	0	0	0	0	0	0	0	0	Pot A
3	4	Denmark	3	3	0	0	17	3	+14	9	Pot A
4	5	France	3	3	0	0	12	0	+12	9 (Note: Ranked on disciplinary points: France −3, Italy −10.)	Pot A
5	2	Italy	3	3	0	0	12	0	+12	9	Pot A
6	9	Greece	3	3	0	0	13	2	+11	9	Pot A
7	3	Republic of Ireland	3	3	0	0	13	3	+10	9	Pot A
8	13	Austria	3	3	0	0	11	1	+10	9	Pot A
9	7	Croatia	3	3	0	0	9	3	+6	9	Pot B
10	1	Belgium	3	2	1	0	17	3	+14	7	Pot B
11	1	Poland	3	2	1	0	16	4	+12	7	Pot B
12	11	Finland	3	2	1	0	5	1	+4	7	Pot B
13	8	Ukraine	3	2	1	0	4	0	+4	7	Pot B
14	12	Netherlands	3	2	1	0	4	2	+2	7	Pot B
15	5	Slovakia	3	2	0	1	12	3	+9	6	Pot B
16	13	Norway	3	2	0	1	10	2	+8	6	Pot B
17	10	Switzerland	3	2	0	1	9	2	+7	6 (Note: Ranked on disciplinary points: Switzerland −3, Russia −6.)	Pot C
18	10	Russia	3	2	0	1	9	2	+7	6	Pot C
19	10	Romania (Y)	3	2	0	1	7	1	+6	6	Pot C
20	9	Germany	3	2	0	1	7	2	+5	6	Pot C
21	2	Turkey	3	2	0	1	8	5	+3	6	Pot C
22	12	Wales	3	2	0	1	6	3	+3	6	Pot C
23	7	Scotland	3	2	0	1	5	3	+2	6	Pot C
24	4	Sweden	3	2	0	1	7	7	0	6	Pot C
25	8	Portugal	3	1	2	0	4	0	+4	5	Pot D
26	11	Czech Republic	3	1	2	0	4	1	+3	5	Pot D
27	6	Hungary	3	1	2	0	3	0	+3	5	Pot D
28	6	Serbia	3	1	1	1	3	3	0	4	Pot D
29	6	Belarus (Y)	3	1	1	1	2	2	0	4	Pot D
30	3	Montenegro	3	1	0	2	3	4	−1	3	Pot D
31	3	Israel (Y)	3	1	0	2	3	5	−2	3	Pot D
32	8	Georgia (Y)	3	0	2	1	0	2	−2	2	Pot D

Source: UEFA
Rules for classification: 1) points; 2) goal difference; 3) goals scored; 4) disciplinary points; 5) coefficient ranking; 6) drawing of lots.
(Y) Third-placed teams from qualifying round (may be drawn with teams from same qualifying round group)

=== Groups ===
The elite round was originally scheduled to be played between 25 and 31 March 2020. On 12 March 2020, UEFA announced that the elite round had been postponed due to the COVID-19 pandemic. UEFA announced on 1 April 2020 that the tournament had been cancelled.

Times up to 28 March 2020 are CET (UTC+1), thereafter times are CEST (UTC+2), as listed by UEFA (local times, if different, are in parentheses).

==== Group 1 ====
Pos	Team	Pld	W	D	L	GF	GA	GD	Pts	Qualification
1	Greece	0	0	0	0	0	0	0	0	Final tournament
2	Ukraine	0	0	0	0	0	0	0	0	Final tournament if among seven best runners-up
3	Turkey (H)	0	0	0	0	0	0	0	0	
4	Belarus	0	0	0	0	0	0	0	0	

First match(es) will be played: 25 March 2020. Source: UEFA
Rules for classification: Tiebreakers
(H) Hosts
25 March 2020
13:00 (15:00 TRT)

Greece	Cancelled	Belarus
	Report

Arslan Zeki Demirci Sports Complex 2, Manavgat
25 March 2020
16:00 (18:00 TRT)

Turkey	Cancelled	Ukraine
	Report

Arslan Zeki Demirci Sports Complex 1, Manavgat

28 March 2020
13:00 (15:00 TRT)

Ukraine	Cancelled	Belarus
	Report

Arslan Zeki Demirci Sports Complex 2, Manavgat
28 March 2020
16:00 (18:00 TRT)

Greece	Cancelled	Turkey
	Report

Arslan Zeki Demirci Sports Complex 1, Manavgat

31 March 2020
15:00 (16:00 TRT)

Ukraine	Cancelled	Greece
	Report

Arslan Zeki Demirci Sports Complex 2, Manavgat
31 March 2020
15:00 (16:00 TRT)

Belarus	Cancelled	Turkey
	Report

Arslan Zeki Demirci Sports Complex 1, Manavgat

==== Group 2 ====
Pos	Team	Pld	W	D	L	GF	GA	GD	Pts	Qualification
1	Italy	0	0	0	0	0	0	0	0	Final tournament
2	Poland (H)	0	0	0	0	0	0	0	0	Final tournament if among seven best runners-up
3	Wales	0	0	0	0	0	0	0	0	
4	Montenegro	0	0	0	0	0	0	0	0	

First match(es) will be played: 25 March 2020. Source: UEFA
Rules for classification: Tiebreakers
(H) Hosts
25 March 2020
14:00

Italy	Cancelled	Montenegro
	Report

Stadion Miejski, Września
25 March 2020
14:00

Wales	Cancelled	Poland
	Report

Stadion Miejski, Swarzędz

28 March 2020
14:00

Italy	Cancelled	Wales
	Report

GOSiR Plewiska, Plewiska
28 March 2020
14:00

Poland	Cancelled	Montenegro
	Report

Stadion Miejski, Swarzędz

31 March 2020
14:00

Poland	Cancelled	Italy
	Report

Stadion Miejski, Swarzędz
31 March 2020
14:00

Montenegro	Cancelled	Wales
	Report

Stadion Miejski, Września

==== Group 3 ====
Pos	Team	Pld	W	D	L	GF	GA	GD	Pts	Qualification
1	Spain	0	0	0	0	0	0	0	0	Final tournament
2	Croatia	0	0	0	0	0	0	0	0	Final tournament if among seven best runners-up
3	Switzerland	0	0	0	0	0	0	0	0	
4	Israel (H)	0	0	0	0	0	0	0	0	

First match(es) will be played: 25 March 2020. Source: UEFA
Rules for classification: Tiebreakers
(H) Hosts
25 March 2020
13:00 (14:00 IST)

Switzerland	Cancelled	Croatia
	Report

Shefayim National Team Complex, Shefayim
25 March 2020
17:00 (18:00 IST)

Spain	Cancelled	Israel
	Report

Netanya Stadium, Netanya

28 March 2020
12:00 (14:00 IDT)

Spain	Cancelled	Switzerland
	Report

Shefayim National Team Complex, Shefayim
28 March 2020
16:00 (18:00 IDT)

Croatia	Cancelled	Israel
	Report

Netanya Stadium, Netanya

31 March 2020
16:30 (17:30 IDT)

Croatia	Cancelled	Spain
	Report

Shefayim National Team Complex, Shefayim
31 March 2020
16:30 (17:30 IDT)

Israel	Cancelled	Switzerland
	Report

Netanya Stadium, Netanya

==== Group 4 ====
Pos	Team	Pld	W	D	L	GF	GA	GD	Pts	Qualification
1	Republic of Ireland	0	0	0	0	0	0	0	0	Final tournament
2	Slovakia	0	0	0	0	0	0	0	0	Final tournament if among seven best runners-up
3	Scotland (H)	0	0	0	0	0	0	0	0	
4	Czech Republic	0	0	0	0	0	0	0	0	

First match(es) will be played: 25 March 2020. Source: UEFA
Rules for classification: Tiebreakers
(H) Hosts
25 March 2020
15:00 (14:00 GMT)

Republic of Ireland	Cancelled	Czech Republic
	Report

Cappielow Park, Greenock
25 March 2020
20:00 (19:00 GMT)

Scotland	Cancelled	Slovakia
	Report

Firhill Stadium, Glasgow

28 March 2020
13:00 (12:00 GMT)

Republic of Ireland	Cancelled	Scotland
	Report

St Mirren Park, Paisley
28 March 2020
13:00 (12:00 GMT)

Slovakia	Cancelled	Czech Republic
	Report

Cappielow Park, Greenock

31 March 2020
13:00 (12:00 BST)

Slovakia	Cancelled	Republic of Ireland
	Report

Firhill Stadium, Glasgow
31 March 2020
13:00 (12:00 BST)

Czech Republic	Cancelled	Scotland
	Report

St Mirren Park, Paisley

==== Group 5 ====
Pos	Team	Pld	W	D	L	GF	GA	GD	Pts	Qualification
1	Austria (H)	0	0	0	0	0	0	0	0	Final tournament
2	Netherlands	0	0	0	0	0	0	0	0	Final tournament if among seven best runners-up
3	Germany	0	0	0	0	0	0	0	0	
4	Portugal	0	0	0	0	0	0	0	0	

First match(es) will be played: 25 March 2020. Source: UEFA
Rules for classification: Tiebreakers
(H) Hosts
25 March 2020
13:00

Austria	Cancelled	Portugal
	Report

Fußballakademie Burgenland, Mattersburg
25 March 2020
18:00

Germany	Cancelled	Netherlands
	Report

Sportanlage Draßburg, Draßburg

28 March 2020
13:00

Netherlands	Cancelled	Portugal
	Report

Fußballakademie Burgenland, Mattersburg
28 March 2020
18:00

Austria	Cancelled	Germany
	Report

Sonnenseestadion, Ritzing

31 March 2020
18:00

Netherlands	Cancelled	Austria
	Report

Sonnenseestadion, Ritzing
31 March 2020
18:00

Portugal	Cancelled	Germany
	Report

Sportanlage Draßburg, Draßburg

==== Group 6 ====
Pos	Team	Pld	W	D	L	GF	GA	GD	Pts	Qualification
1	England	0	0	0	0	0	0	0	0	Final tournament
2	Belgium (H)	0	0	0	0	0	0	0	0	Final tournament if among seven best runners-up
3	Romania	0	0	0	0	0	0	0	0	
4	Georgia	0	0	0	0	0	0	0	0	

First match(es) will be played: 25 March 2020. Source: UEFA
Rules for classification: Tiebreakers
(H) Hosts
25 March 2020
15:30

England	Cancelled	Georgia
	Report

Kehrwegstadion, Eupen
25 March 2020
19:00

Romania	Cancelled	Belgium
	Report

Luminus Arena Stadium B, Genk

28 March 2020
15:30

England	Cancelled	Romania
	Report

Académie Robert Louis-Dreyfus, Liège
28 March 2020
19:00

Belgium	Cancelled	Georgia
	Report

Kehrwegstadion, Eupen

31 March 2020
15:30

Belgium	Cancelled	England
	Report

Académie Robert Louis-Dreyfus, Liège
31 March 2020
15:30

Georgia	Cancelled	Romania
	Report

Luminus Arena Stadium B, Genk

==== Group 7 ====
Pos	Team	Pld	W	D	L	GF	GA	GD	Pts	Qualification
1	Denmark	0	0	0	0	0	0	0	0	Final tournament
2	Finland	0	0	0	0	0	0	0	0	Final tournament if among seven best runners-up
3	Russia (H)	0	0	0	0	0	0	0	0	
4	Serbia	0	0	0	0	0	0	0	0	

First match(es) will be played: 25 March 2020. Source: UEFA
Rules for classification: Tiebreakers
(H) Hosts
25 March 2020
10:00 (12:00 MSK)

Denmark	Cancelled	Serbia
	Report

Sapsan Arena, Moscow
25 March 2020
16:00 (18:00 MSK)

Russia	Cancelled	Finland
	Report

Sapsan Arena, Moscow

28 March 2020
10:00 (12:00 MSK)

Finland	Cancelled	Serbia
	Report

Sapsan Arena, Moscow
28 March 2020
16:00 (18:00 MSK)

Denmark	Cancelled	Russia
	Report

Sapsan Arena, Moscow

31 March 2020
15:00 (16:00 MSK)

Finland	Cancelled	Denmark
	Report

Oktyabr Stadium Artificial Turf, Moscow
31 March 2020
15:00 (16:00 MSK)

Serbia	Cancelled	Russia
	Report

Sapsan Arena, Moscow

==== Group 8 ====
Pos	Team	Pld	W	D	L	GF	GA	GD	Pts	Qualification
1	France	0	0	0	0	0	0	0	0	Final tournament
2	Norway	0	0	0	0	0	0	0	0	Final tournament if among seven best runners-up
3	Sweden	0	0	0	0	0	0	0	0	
4	Hungary (H)	0	0	0	0	0	0	0	0	

First match(es) will be played: 25 March 2020. Source: UEFA
Rules for classification: Tiebreakers
(H) Hosts
25 March 2020
16:00

Sweden	Cancelled	Norway
	Report

Pancho Aréna Puskás pitch, Felcsút
25 March 2020
20:15

France	Cancelled	Hungary
	Report

Pancho Aréna, Felcsút

28 March 2020
14:30

France	Cancelled	Sweden
	Report

Pancho Aréna Puskás pitch, Felcsút
28 March 2020
17:00

Norway	Cancelled	Hungary
	Report

Pancho Aréna, Felcsút

31 March 2020
15:00

Norway	Cancelled	France
	Report

Pancho Aréna Puskás pitch, Felcsút
31 March 2020
15:00

Hungary	Cancelled	Sweden
	Report

Pancho Aréna, Felcsút

=== Ranking of second-placed teams ===
To determine the seven best second-placed teams from the elite round which qualify for the final tournament, all results are taken into account (Regulations Article 15.02). This is different from the elite round of previous qualifying tournaments where the results against the teams in fourth place are discarded.

Pos	Grp	Team	Pld	W	D	L	GF	GA	GD	Pts	Qualification
1	1	Group 1 second place	0	0	0	0	0	0	0	0	Final tournament
2	2	Group 2 second place	0	0	0	0	0	0	0	0	Final tournament
3	3	Group 3 second place	0	0	0	0	0	0	0	0	Final tournament
4	4	Group 4 second place	0	0	0	0	0	0	0	0	Final tournament
5	5	Group 5 second place	0	0	0	0	0	0	0	0	Final tournament
6	6	Group 6 second place	0	0	0	0	0	0	0	0	Final tournament
7	7	Group 7 second place	0	0	0	0	0	0	0	0	Final tournament
8	8	Group 8 second place	0	0	0	0	0	0	0	0	

First match(es) will be played: 25 March 2020. Source: UEFA
Rules for classification: 1) points; 2) goal difference; 3) goals scored; 4) disciplinary points; 5) coefficient ranking; 6) drawing of lots.

== Qualified teams ==
The following 16 teams qualify for the final tournament.

Team	Qualified as	Qualified on	Previous appearances in Under-17 Euro^{1} only U-17 era (since 2002)
Estonia	Hosts	9 December 2016	0 (debut)
TBD	Elite round Group 1 winners	31 March 2020 (or 28 March 2020)	
TBD	Elite round Group 2 winners	31 March 2020 (or 28 March 2020)	
TBD	Elite round Group 3 winners	31 March 2020 (or 28 March 2020)	
TBD	Elite round Group 4 winners	31 March 2020 (or 28 March 2020)	
TBD	Elite round Group 5 winners	31 March 2020 (or 28 March 2020)	
TBD	Elite round Group 6 winners	31 March 2020 (or 28 March 2020)	
TBD	Elite round Group 7 winners	31 March 2020 (or 28 March 2020)	
TBD	Elite round Group 8 winners	31 March 2020 (or 28 March 2020)	
TBD	Elite round best seven runners-up	31 March 2020 (or 28 March 2020)	
TBD	Elite round best seven runners-up	31 March 2020 (or 28 March 2020)	
TBD	Elite round best seven runners-up	31 March 2020 (or 28 March 2020)	
TBD	Elite round best seven runners-up	31 March 2020 (or 28 March 2020)	
TBD	Elite round best seven runners-up	31 March 2020 (or 28 March 2020)	
TBD	Elite round best seven runners-up	31 March 2020 (or 28 March 2020)	
TBD	Elite round best seven runners-up	31 March 2020 (or 28 March 2020)	

^{1} Bold indicates champions for that year. Italic indicates hosts for that year.

== Goalscorers ==
In the qualifying round, there were 289 goals scored in 78 matches, for an average of 3.71 goals per match.

5 goals

- (France) Matthis Abline
- (Poland) Szymon Włodarczyk

4 goals

- (Belgium) Anthony Descotte
- (Denmark) Wahidullah Faghir
- (Greece) Georgios Koutsias
- (Greece) Christos Liatsos
- (North Macedonia) Emir Saitoski
- (Norway) Tobias Gulliksen

3 goals

- (Austria) Yusuf Demir
- (Bosnia and Herzegovina) Denis Alijagić
- (Bulgaria) Martin Smolenski
- (Croatia) Bartol Barišić
- (Denmark) Andreas Bredahl
- (Germany) Torben Rhein
- (Italy) Luca Magazzù
- (Lithuania) Gustas Jarusevičius
- (Norway) Bryan Fiabema
- (Poland) Kacper Kozłowski
- (Republic of Ireland) Evan Ferguson
- (Russia) Magomedkhabib Abdusalamov
- (Russia) Artyom Sokolov
- (Serbia) Boris Krstić
- (Sweden) Edwin Andersson
- (Switzerland) Bradley Fink
- (Turkey) Ömer Faruk Beyaz
- (Turkey) Ali Sühan Demirel

2 goals

- (Austria) Lorenzo Coco
- (Austria) Benjamin Kanuric
- (Belgium) Nils De Wilde
- (Belgium) Ilyas El Gharbi
- (Belgium) Samuel Mbangula Tshifunda
- (Belgium) Kazeem Olaigbe
- (Denmark) Eskild Dall
- (Finland) Leo Walta
- (France) Hannibal Mejbri
- (France) Loum Tchaouna
- (Germany) Turan Çalhanoğlu
- (Greece) Apostolos Christopoulos
- (Iceland) Danijel Dejan Djuric
- (Italy) Ramen Cepele
- (Italy) Fabio Miretti
- (Italy) Alessio Rossi
- (Northern Ireland) Sean McAllister
- (Norway) Mathias Bauer
- (Poland) Patryk Kusztal
- (Poland) Ariel Mosór
- (Poland) Dominik Wasilewski
- (Republic of Ireland) Anselmo Garcia McNulty
- (Republic of Ireland) Ben McCormack
- (Romania) Roberto Malaele
- (Scotland) Liam Morrison
- (Slovakia) Timotej Jambor
- (Slovakia) Thomas Kotlár
- (Slovakia) Christian Veliký
- (Sweden) Oscar Wilhelmsson
- (Switzerland) Joël Ribeiro
- (Switzerland) Evan Rossier

1 goal

- (Andorra) Marc Rodrigues
- (Austria) Din Barlov
- (Austria) Elias Havel
- (Austria) Lukas Wallner
- (Austria) Philipp Wydra
- (Azerbaijan) Berkay Vardar
- (Armenia) Samvel Hakobyan
- (Belarus) Yuliy Kuznetsov
- (Belarus) Kirill Zinovich
- (Belgium) Alexandro Calut
- (Belgium) Pierre Dwomoh
- (Belgium) David Eeckhout
- (Belgium) Tim Engwanda Ongena
- (Belgium) Luca Oyen
- (Bosnia and Herzegovina) Džanan Mehičević
- (Bosnia and Herzegovina) Amar Musić
- (Bulgaria) Biser Bonev
- (Bulgaria) Dimo Krastev
- (Bulgaria) Plamen Tsonchev
- (Croatia) Noel Bilić
- (Croatia) Ivan Ćubelić
- (Croatia) Tomislav Duvnjak
- (Croatia) Viktor Kanižaj
- (Croatia) Leonardo Petrović
- (Croatia) Ivan Šaranić
- (Cyprus) Andreas Georgiou
- (Cyprus) Ilias Kostis
- (Cyprus) Loizos Loizou
- (Czech Republic) Jáchym Šíp
- (Czech Republic) Filip Uriča
- (Czech Republic) Filip Vecheta
- (Czech Republic) Martin Vitík
- (Denmark) Andreas Andersen
- (Denmark) Rasmus Højlund
- (Denmark) Valdemar Jensen
- (Denmark) Victor Lind
- (Denmark) Filip Panjeskovic
- (Denmark) Marcelo Randolf
- (Denmark) Christian Rasmussen
- (Denmark) William Vick
- (Faroe Islands) Suni Hansen
- (Faroe Islands) Poul Kallsberg
- (Finland) Kasper Paananen
- (Finland) Niklas Pyyhtiä
- (Finland) Casper Terho
- (France) Salim Ben Seghir
- (France) Lucas Gourna Douath
- (France) Lisandru Tramoni
- (Germany) Luca Netz
- (Germany) Danny Schmidt
- (Gibraltar) Christian Scott Zammitt-Agius
- (Greece) Vasileios Kitsakis
- (Greece) Fotios Kitsos
- (Greece) Georgios Syrmis
- (Hungary) Zombor Gábor Bakos
- (Hungary) Dániel Németh
- (Iceland) Orri Steinn Óskarsson
- (Israel) Ellay Yacob Shafiki
- (Israel) Dor David Turgeman
- (Israel) Nehorai Yifrah
- (Italy) Tommaso Baldanzi
- (Italy) Alessio Rosa
- (Kazakhstan) Arsen Azatov
- (Kazakhstan) Dias Kushkumbayev
- (Kazakhstan) Alisher Rakhimzhanov
- (Kosovo) Bleron Ademi
- (Kosovo) Granit Hana
- (Latvia) Maksims Fjodorovs
- (Latvia) Kristiāns Kaušelis
- (Lithuania) Titas Buzas
- (Lithuania) Eimantas Dzinga
- (Lithuania) Motiejus Slivka
- (Lithuania) Arnas Spyčius
- (Luxembourg) Eldin Dzogovic
- (Montenegro) Ognjen Bakić
- (Montenegro) Jovan Dašić
- (Montenegro) Nikola Vukotić
- (Netherlands) Yusuf Barasi
- (Netherlands) Dillon Hoogewerf
- (Netherlands) Mylian Jimenez
- (Netherlands) Xavi Simons
- (North Macedonia) Behar Feta
- (North Macedonia) Filip Gjorgoski
- (North Macedonia) Alban Taipi
- (Northern Ireland) Charlie Allen
- (Northern Ireland) Ross McCausland
- (Northern Ireland) Ciaran McGuckin
- (Northern Ireland) Cameron Stewart
- (Norway) Kristian Arnstad
- (Poland) Filip Balcewicz
- (Poland) Bartosz Matuła
- (Portugal) Joelson Fernandes
- (Portugal) André Ferreira
- (Portugal) Herculano Nabian
- (Portugal) João Resende
- (Republic of Ireland) Sinclair Armstrong
- (Republic of Ireland) Colin Conroy
- (Republic of Ireland) Calum Kavanagh
- (Republic of Ireland) Robert Mahon
- (Republic of Ireland) Oliver O'Neill
- (Romania) Luca Andronache
- (Romania) Stefan Bodisteanu
- (Romania) Bogdan Lazar
- (Romania) George Claudiu Negoescu
- (Romania) Andrei Pandele
- (Russia) Garrik Levin
- (Russia) Vitali Shitov
- (Russia) Arsen Zakharyan
- (Scotland) Jayden Fairley
- (Scotland) Kevin Hanratty
- (Scotland) Chris Mochrie
- (Slovakia) Rudolf Božík
- (Slovakia) Tobias Čongrády
- (Slovakia) Adrián Macejko
- (Slovakia) Marián Šmatlák
- (Slovakia) Daniel Szalma
- (Slovakia) Samuel Urgela
- (Slovenia) Benjamin Šeško
- (Slovenia) Domen Zajšek
- (Sweden) Linus Mattsson
- (Sweden) Ludvig Nåvik
- (Switzerland) Andrin Hunziker
- (Switzerland) Tyron Owusu
- (Turkey) Selman Faruk Dibek
- (Turkey) Ahmetcan Kaplan
- (Ukraine) Mark Mampasi
- (Ukraine) Oleh Ocheretko
- (Ukraine) Dmytro Shostak
- (Ukraine) Nazar Voloshyn
- (Wales) Matthew Baker
- (Wales) Marcus Dackers
- (Wales) Joshua Edwards
- (Wales) Liam Higgins
- (Wales) Ryan Viggars
- (Wales) Jay Williams

1 own goal

- (Andorra) Eric del Pozo (against the Republic of Ireland)
- (Latvia) Maksims Fjodorovs (against Hungary)
- (Luxembourg) Diogo Monteiro de Oliveira (against Italy)
- (Luxembourg) Noah Rossler (against Northern Ireland)
