= Mušicki =

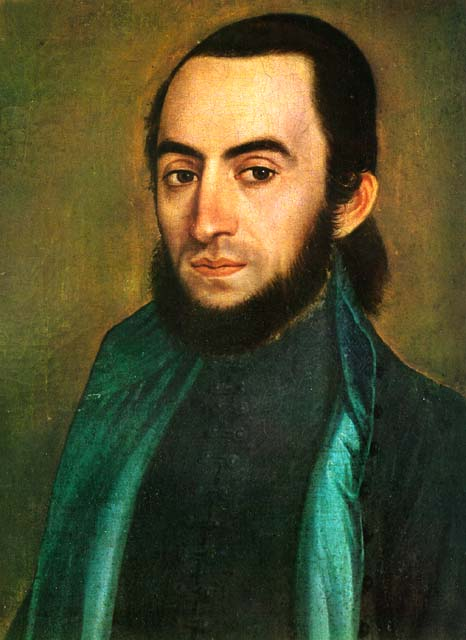
- Lukijan Mušicki (1777–1837)
- Pronunciation: pronounced [muʃǐtskiː]

Origin
- Language: Serbian
- Meaning: (demonymic) "of Mušić"

Mušicki (Serbian Cyrillic: Мушицки, pronounced [muʃǐtskiː]) is a Serbian family name, a demonymic derived from the historical village of Mušić (now Gornji Mušić and Donji Mušić, in Mionica). The ancestors of Lukijan Mušicki had settled in Habsburg territory (Bačka) from Mušić in the Ottoman Valjevo nahija (district). The surname was misspelled in records, the correct form being Mušićki (Мушићки). The old spelling was Emušickij (Емушицкиј), as seen from a 1797 letter of Lukijan Mušicki; he later shortened it to Mušicki. It may refer to:

- Kosta Mušicki (1897–1946), Serbian collaborationist commander
- Lukijan Mušicki (1777–1837), Serbian poet, prose writer, and polyglot
- Colonel Lazar Mušicki, a Yugoslavian who was for a time between August 1964 and January 1965 acting Commander of the UNEF
