= Mušić =

Mušić may refer to:

- Mušić, Bosnia and Herzegovina, a village near Kupres
- Gornji Mušić, a village near Mionica, Serbia
- Donji Mušić, a village near Mionica, Serbia
- Omer Mušić, Bosnian orientalist
- Fatima Mušić, Bosnian pilot

== See also ==
- Mušič
