= Kotlyar =

Kotlyar, Kotliar, Kotlar, Cotlar, Cotlear, or Cotliar is an occupational surname, meaning "boilermaker" in multiple languages.

== Variations ==
Language	Masculine	Feminine
Belarusian (Romanization)	Катляр (Katlyar, Katliar)	
Czech	Kotlář	Kotlářová
Polish	Kotlarz	
Russian (Romanization)	Котляр (Kotlyar, Kotliar)	
Serbo-Croatian	Kotlar	
Slovak	Kotlár	Kotlárová
Ukrainian (Romanization)	Котляр (Kotlyar, Kotliar)	
Other	Cotlar, Cotliar, Cotlear	

== People ==
- Anton Kotlyar (born 1993), Ukrainian footballer
- Gabriel Kotliar (born 1957), American physicist
- Nadiia Kotliar (born 1993), Ukrainian acrobatic gymnast
- Nikolai Kotlyar (1935–2003), Soviet politician
- Thomas Kotlár (born 2003), Slovak footballer
- Yelyzaveta Kotliar (born 2007), Ukrainian tennis player
- Mischa Cotlar (1913–2007), Argentine mathematician
- Tatiana Cotliar (born 1988), Argentine fashion model
