= Musić =

Musić (Cyrillic: Мусић) is a Serbo-Croatian surname.

In the Middle Ages in Serbia there was a Musić noble family.

Notable people with the name include:

- Amar Musić (born 1987), Croatian weightlifter
- Amar Musić (footballer) (born 2003), Bosnian footballer
- Ermin Musić (born 1997), Bosnian footballer
- Novak Musić (born 1998), Serbian basketball player
- Vedin Musić (born 1973), Bosnian footballer

== See also ==
- Mušić
- Mušič
