= Alban Taipi =

Macedonian footballer

Personal information
- Full name: Албан Таипи
- Date of birth: 21 June 2003 (age 23)
- Place of birth: Gostivar, Macedonia
- Height: 1.89 m (6 ft 2 in)
- Position: Forward

Team information
- Current team: Otrant-Olympic
- Number: 9

Youth career
- 2008–2014: Renova

Senior career*
| Years | Team | Apps | (Gls) |
| 2020–2022 | Renova | 12 | (1) |
| 2022–2024 | Haladás | 12 | (2) |
| 2023 | → Szentlőrinci (loan) | 29 | (3) |
| 2023–2024 | Besa Dobërdoll | 10 | (6) |
| 2025 | Detonit | 15 | (8) |
| 2025–2026 | Arsimi | 17 | (7) |
| 2026 | Kudrivka | 7 | (0) |
| 2026– | Otrant-Olympic | 12 | (5) |

International career^{‡}
| 2017–2018 | North Macedonia U15 | 8 | (4) |
| 2018–2019 | North Macedonia U16 | 3 | (0) |
| 2019–2020 | North Macedonia U17 | 8 | (3) |
- * Club domestic league appearances and goals as of 15 November 2026 ‡ National team caps and goals as of 15 February 2026

Alban Taipi (Macedonian: Албан Таипи; born 21 June 2003) is a Macedonian professional footballer who plays as a striker for Otrant-Olympic.

== Career ==
Born in Gostivar, Taipi started playing football in Renova at the age of 16 years.

On 28 February 2022 he scored his first goal against Pelister at the Petar Miloševski Stadium. In 2022, he signed with Haladás in Nemzeti Bajnokság II in Hungary.

In January 2023 he was loaned to Szentlőrinci where he earned 29 cups and scored 3 goals.

In 2024, he moved to Besa Dobërdoll. He also played for Detonit in Macedonian Second Football League.

In January 2025, he signed for Arsimi in Macedonian Second Football League. He earned 26 caps and scored 6 goals, helping the club to be promoted to the Macedonian First Football League.

In February 2026, he moved to Kudrivka in Ukrainian Premier League. On 2 March 2026, he made his debut with the new club against Poltava at the Obolon Arena in Kyiv.

On 12 July 2026, he moved to Otrant-Olympic .

== International career ==
In 2017 he was called up by the North Macedonia U15. In 2018 he was called up by the North Macedonia U16. In 2019, he was called up by the North Macedonia U17 to play for the Qualitication for 2020 UEFA European Under-17 Championship. On 15 October 2019, he scored against Liechtenstein.

== Honours ==
Szentlőrinci SE

- Nemzeti Bajnokság III: 2023–24

KF Besa Dobërdoll

- Macedonian Second League: 2023–24

KF Arsimi

- Macedonian Second Football League: Runners-up 2024-25
