= 2026 Raufoss IL season =

Raufoss
2026 season
- Chairman: Mathias Engebakken
- Head coach: Kasey Wehrman (until 11 May); Ole Petter Berget (from 27 May)
- Stadium: Nammo Stadion
- 1. divisjon: 14th
- 2026–27 Norwegian Cup: Pre-season
Home colours	Away colours	Third colours

== Transfers ==
=== In ===
Pos.	Player	Transferred from	Fee	Date	Source
DF	(Sweden) Alexander Achinioti-Jönsson	(Canada) Forge FC		14 February 2026	
FW	(Brazil) Filip Fjeldheim Da Silva	(Norway) Ullensaker/Kisa		26 February 2026	
MF	(Norway) Rafik Zekhnini	(Norway) Odd		8 March 2026	
DF	(Somalia) Saadiq Faisal Elmi	(Norway) Moss		30 March 2026	
DF	(Norway) Erik Ansok Frøysa	(Norway) Aalesund	Loan	31 March 2026	

== Pre-season and friendlies ==
24 January 2026	Raufoss	2–0	Gjøvik Lyn	Raufoss
				Stadium: Raufoss Industripark Arena

31 January 2026	Raufoss	4–0	Elverum	Raufoss
				Stadium: Raufoss Industripark Arena

6 February 2026	Raufoss	2–1	Lyn	Raufoss
				Stadium: Raufoss Industripark Arena

27 February 2026	Raufoss	3–3	Moss	Raufoss
				Stadium: Raufoss Industripark Arena

7 March 2026	Raufoss	3–0	Strømmen	Raufoss
				Stadium: Raufoss Industripark Arena

14 March 2026	Raufoss	1–4	Kjelsås	Raufoss
				Stadium: Raufoss Industripark Arena

21 March 2026	Sogndal	1–1	Raufoss	Sogndal
				Stadium: Fosshaugane Campus

29 March 2026	Raufoss	3–2	Mjøndalen	Raufoss
				Stadium: Nammo Stadion

== Competitions ==
=== Overall record ===
Competition	First match	Last match	Starting round	Record							
Competition	First match	Last match	Starting round	Pld	W	D	L	GF	GA	GD	Win %
Norwegian First Division	13 April 2026		Matchday 1	11	2	1	8	13	27	−14	18.18
2025–26 Norwegian Football Cup			Fourth round	0	0	0	0	0	0	+0	—
2026–27 Norwegian Football Cup				0	0	0	0	0	0	+0	—
Total				11	2	1	8	13	27	−14	18.18

Source: Competitions

=== Norwegian First Division ===
Pos	Team	Pld	W	D	L	GF	GA	GD	Pts	Promotion, qualification or relegation
12	Moss	16	5	2	9	25	36	−11	17	
13	Lyn	16	5	2	9	21	33	−12	17	
14	Raufoss	16	5	1	10	19	34	−15	16	Qualification for the relegation play-offs
15	Strømmen	16	4	3	9	21	37	−16	15	Relegation to Second Division
16	Åsane	16	4	2	10	24	37	−13	13 (Note: Åsane deducted 1 point due to late submission of financial reporting package.)	Relegation to Second Division

Updated to match(es) played on 3 August 2026. Source: OBOS-ligaen (in Norwegian)
Rules for classification: 1) Points; 2) Goal difference; 3) Goals scored; 4) Head-to-head points; 5) Head-to-head goal difference; 6) Head-to-head goals scored.

==== Results summary ====
Overall								Home						Away					
Pld	W	D	L	GF	GA	GD	Pts	W	D	L	GF	GA	GD	W	D	L	GF	GA	GD
0	0	0	0	0	0	0	0	0	0	0	0	0	0	0	0	0	0	0	0

==== Results by round ====
Round	1	2	3	4	5	6	7	8	9
Ground	A	H	A	H	A	H	A	H	A
Result	L	L	L	D	L	L	W	W	L
Position									

A = Away; H = Home; W = Win; D = Draw; L = Loss; P = Postponed

==== Matches ====
The match schedule was issued on 19 December 2025.

13 April 2026 2	Raufoss	1–3	Kongsvinger

17 April 2026 3	Ranheim	5–1	Raufoss

26 April 2026 4	Raufoss	1–1	Hødd

1 May 2026 5	Odd	1–0	Raufoss

6 May 2026 1	Egersund	2–1	Raufoss

10 May 2026 6	Raufoss	0–1	Lyn

16 May 2026 7	Stabæk	1–2	Raufoss

20 May 2026 8	Raufoss	3–0	Bryne

25 May 2026 9	Åsane	3–0	Raufoss

14 June 2026 11	Strømsgodset	6–1	Raufoss	Drammen
16:00				Stadium: Marienlyst Stadion

3 July 2026 14	Raufoss	1–0	Strømmen
18:00

=== Norwegian Football Cup ===
22–23 August 2026 First round	Ridabu	v	Raufoss
