= 2025–26 Hillerød Fodbold season =

Hillerød Fodbold
2025–26 season
- Manager: Christian Lønstrup
- Stadium: Hillerød Stadium
- Danish 1st Division: Regular season: 3rd
- Danish 1st Division: Promotion round: 2nd
- Danish Cup: Third round
- Top goalscorer: League: Poul Kallsberg (4); All: Saman Jalaei (6)

During the 2025–26 season, Hillerød Fodbold is competing in its 89th season overall in the Danish First Division and the Danish Cup, where it was eliminated in the third round.

== Transfers ==
=== In ===
Pos.	Player	Transferred from	Fee	Date	Source
DF	(Denmark) Victor Dedes	(Denmark) HIK		1 July 2025	
MF	(Denmark) Mikkel Mouritz	(Denmark) Boldklubben af 1893		7 July 2025	
MF	(Faroe Islands) Poul Kallsberg	(Faroe Islands) Víkingur Gøta		15 August 2025	
FW	(Ghana) Abdul Hakim Sulemana	(Denmark) Randers	Loan	1 September 2025	
FW	(Denmark) Frederik Heiselberg	(Norway) Aalesund		30 January 2026	
MF	(Denmark) Rezan Corlu	Unattached	Free	4 February 2026	

=== Out ===
Pos.	Player	Transferred to	Fee	Date	Source
DF	(Faroe Islands) Daniel Johansen	(Faroe Islands) Klaksvíkar Ítróttarfelag		1 July 2025	
MF	(Denmark) Markus Bay	(Denmark) Fremad Amager		31 July 2025	
FW	(Denmark) Mathias Veltz	(Denmark) Roskilde		25 August 2025	
FW	(Nigeria) Monday Etim	(Romania) Universitatea Craiova	€200,000	2 September 2025	
FW	(Faroe Islands) Adrian Justinussen	(Denmark) Horsens		1 January 2026	
MF	(Italy) Alessio Alicino	(Denmark) HIK		13 January 2026	
DF	(Denmark) Victor Dedes	(Norway) Strømsgodset		17 January 2026	
GK	(Ghana) Benjamin Asare	(Denmark) Ishøj IF		29 January 2026	

== Pre-season and friendlies ==
28 June 2025	Lyngby	2–3	Hillerød

4 July 2025	Hillerød	1–4	AaB Fodbold

12 July 2025	Hillerød	1–1	Helsingborg

24 January 2026	Hillerød	1–1	Holbæk

31 January 2026	Landskrona	3–1	Hillerød

2 February 2026	Brøndby	1–2	Hillerød

7 February 2026	Helsingborg	2–1	Hillerød

9 February 2026	Brøndby	2–1	Hillerød

12 February 2026	Hillerød	2–5	Næstved

13 February 2026	Hillerød	3–3	Helsingør

20 February 2026	Hillerød	2–2	Lyngby

25 March 2026	Hillerød	1–2	Lyngby

== Danish 1st Division ==
=== Regular season ===
Pos	Team	Pld	W	D	L	GF	GA	GD	Pts	Promotion or Relegation
1	Lyngby	22	12	6	4	49	25	+24	42	Advances to Promotion Group
2	Hvidovre	22	10	9	3	34	23	+11	39	Advances to Promotion Group
3	Hillerød	22	10	7	5	33	29	+4	37	Advances to Promotion Group
4	Esbjerg fB	22	11	4	7	32	29	+3	37	Advances to Promotion Group
5	Kolding	22	9	6	7	29	23	+6	33	Advances to Promotion Group

Updated to match(es) played on completed. Source: Betinia LIGA
Rules for classification: 1) points; 2) goal difference; 3) number of goals scored

19 July 2025 1	Hillerød	2–1	Middelfart
14:00

26 July 2025 2	Hillerød	2–2	AaB Fodbold
14:00

1 August 2025 3	B.93	1–2	Hillerød
19:00

9 August 2025 4	Aarhus Fremad	3–1	Hillerød
14:00

16 August 2025 5	Hillerød	0–2	Hobro
14:00

19 August 2025 6	Lyngby	1–2	Hillerød
19:00

23 August 2025 7	Hillerød	3–1	HB Køge
14:00

29 August 2025 8	Kolding	0–0	Hillerød
19:00

14 September 2025 9	Hillerød	3–0	Esbjerg
14:00

20 September 2025 10	Hvidovre	3–1	Hillerød
14:00

27 September 2025 11	Hillerød	2–1	Horsens
14:00

4 October 2025 12	Middelfart	1–2	Hillerød
14:00

18 October 2025 13	Hillerød	1–1	Hvidovre
14:00

25 October 2025 14	Hobro	1–2	Hillerød
14:00

1 November 2025 15	Hillerød	1–1	Kolding
14:00

7 November 2025 16	HB Køge	1–1	Hillerød
18:30

23 November 2025 17	Horsens	3–1	Hillerød
15:00

28 November 2025 18	Hillerød	1–0	Lyngby
19:00

27 February 2026 19	AaB Fodbold	3–3	Hillerød
19:00

7 March 2026 20	Hillerød	0–1	B.93
14:00

15 March 2026 21	Esbjerg	2–2	Hillerød
14:00

21 March 2026 22	Hillerød	1–0	Aarhus Fremad
13:00

=== Promotion group ===
Pos	Team	Pld	W	D	L	GF	GA	GD	Pts	Promotion or Relegation
2	Hvidovre	27	11	11	5	39	29	+10	44	Advances to 2026–27 Danish Superliga
3	AC Horsens	28	12	8	8	34	26	+8	44	
4	Hillerød	27	11	10	6	37	33	+4	43	
5	Esbjerg fB	28	12	6	10	35	40	−5	42	
6	Kolding	27	9	7	11	32	32	0	34	

Updated to match(es) played on 2 May 2026. Source: Betinia LIGA
Rules for classification: 1) points; 2) goal difference; 3) number of goals scored

3 April 2026 23	Hvidovre	1–1	Hillerød	Hvidovre
15:30

11 April 2026 24	Hillerød	0–0	Horsens	Hillerød
12:30

17 April 2026 25	Esbjerg	0–0	Hillerød	Esbjerg
18:30

21 April 2026 26	Hillerød	1–3	Lyngby	Hillerød
20:00

25 April 2026 27	Hillerød	2–0	Kolding	Hillerød
14:00

3 May 2026 28	Lyngby	1–2	Hillerød	Lyngby
16:00

9 May 2026 29	Horsens	v	Hillerød	Horsens
14:00

=== Danish Cup ===
5 August 2025 First round	Boldklubben Viktoria	0–5	Hillerød
18:00

2 September 2025 Second round	Brøndby Strand	2–3	Hillerød
17:00

24 September 2025 Third round	Hillerød	1–2	AGF	Hillerød
15:00
