= Pálmi Rafn Arinbjörnsson =

Icelandic footballer (born 2003)

Personal information
- Full name: Pálmi Rafn Arinbjörnsson
- Date of birth: 29 November 2003 (age 22)
- Place of birth: Iceland
- Height: 1.91 m (6 ft 3 in)
- Position: Goalkeeper

Team information
- Current team: Víkingur
- Number: 16

Senior career*
Years	Team	Apps	(Gls)
2018–2019	Njarðvík	0	(0)
2020–2023	Wolverhampton Wanderers	0	(0)
2022	→ Skeid (loan)	1	(0)
2024–	Víkingur	16	(0)
- * Club domestic league appearances and goals as of 2 November 2025

Pálmi Rafn Arinbjörnsson (born 29 November 2003) is an Icelandic footballer who plays as a goalkeeper for Víkingur.

== Early life ==
He was born in 2003 in Iceland. He joined the youth academy of English side Wolverhampton Wanderers at the age of fifteen.

== Club career ==
In 2022, he was sent on loan to Norwegian side Skeid. In 2024, he signed for Icelandic side Víkingur.

== International career ==
He has represented Iceland internationally at youth level. He played for the Iceland national under-17 football team at 2020 UEFA European Under-17 Championship qualification.

== Personal life ==
He has a younger brother. He has been the client of Icelandic football agent Bjarki Gunnlaugsson.
