= Lukijan Mušicki =

Serbian poet, writer (1777–1837)

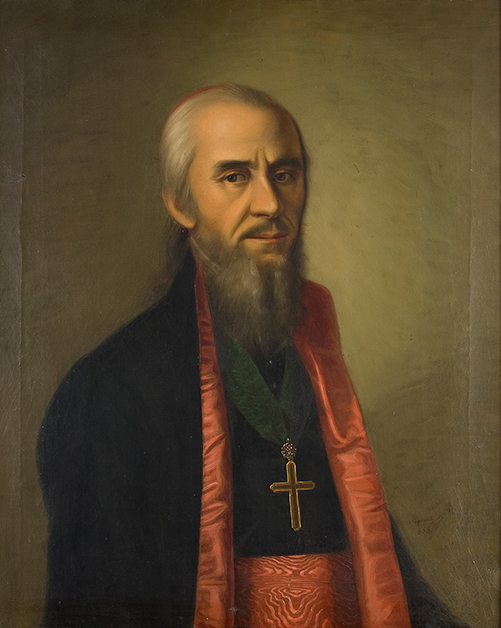
- Portrait by Novak Radonić, 1858
- Born: Luka Mušicki; 27 January 1777; Temerin, Kingdom of Hungary
- Died: 15 March 1837 (aged 60); Karlovac, Austrian Empire
- Occupations: Poet, archimandrite

Lukijan Mušicki (Serbian Cyrillic: Лукијан Мушицки, pronounced [lukǐjaːn muʃǐtskiː]; 27 January 1777 – 15 March 1837) was a Serbian Orthodox bishop, writer and poet. From 1828, he was a Serbian Orthodox bishop at Sremski Karlovci in the Austrian Empire until 1837. Mušicki is best remembered as the "first artistic poet in Serbian literature".

== Biography ==
Luka Mušicki was born on 27 January 1777 in Temerin, Bács-Bodrog County (now Serbia), to father Georgije and mother Anastazija. He comes from the Čitaković family which moved to Bačka from the village Mušić in the Valjevo area. Even today, there are Donji Mušić and Gornji Mušić, after whom the family was named "Mušićani". Most likely, some Austrian Slovak official changed it to the version Mušický. They settled on a wasteland near Subotica, and it was named after them. Later, the family moved to Temerin. He attended elementary school in Temerin with teacher Pavle Milenović, the famous krasnopista. He attended Serbian school for another year in Titel with his uncle, teacher Stevan Popović. Then he attended a German border guard school for two additional years. He graduated from high school in Novi Sad and Szegedin, and law and philosophy in Pest. After completing his studies, he became the administrator of the Orthodox metropolitan office in Sremski Karlovci, a theology teacher, and became a monk in November 1802, receiving his monastic name from Metropolitan Stefan Stratimirović, after the Greek philosopher Lucian. He was elevated to archimandrite of Šišatovac and served from 1812 to 1824. In 1823, he accepted the administration of the Upper Karlovci eparchy and undertook intensive educational work to improve the education of his people. From 1828 until his death, he was the bishop of Gornjo-Karlovac, with his seat first in Plaški, and from 1829 in Karlovac.

There were schools in German in the Austrian Military Frontier, and he opened the first schools in the Serbian language in Plaški (Glavno, 1824-1827), Škare, Zrmanja (Gračac), and Mutilić. As an archimandrite, he founded the Theological School in Plaški in 1824, where he taught science. As bishop of Gornjo-Karlovac, he transferred it to Karlovac in 1829, and in its place, in 1831, he founded the Preparatory Theological School in Plaški. Mušicki "brought out from it and sent out to the people young priests, established in Orthodoxy and conscious Serbs". He also arranged for Serbian children in German border schools to receive Serbian Orthodox catechisms. He founded a foundation with a capital of 7,000 forints at the Serbian Preparatory School in Karlovac. From which two female teacher trainees received 120 forints per year.

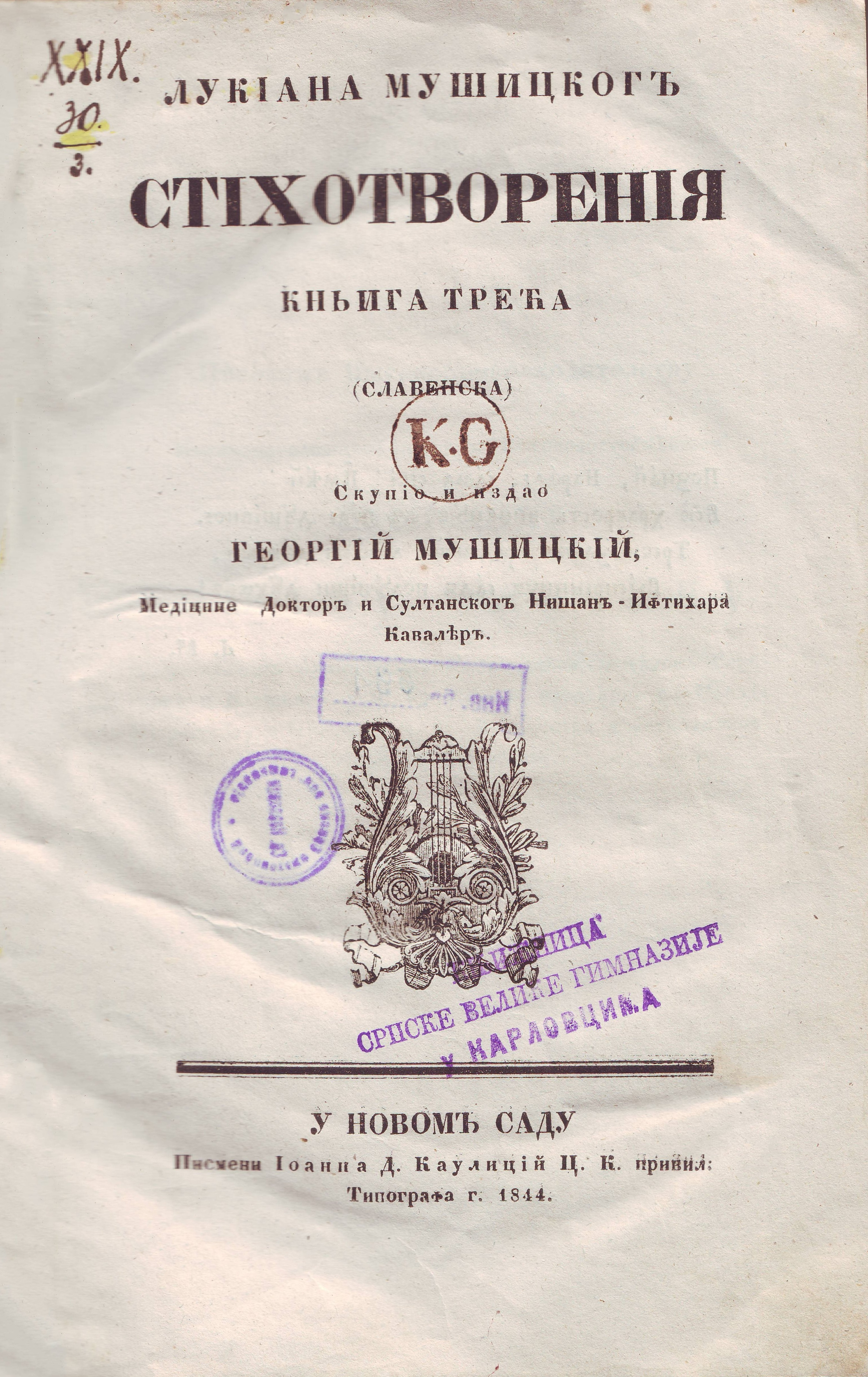
Cover page of the third book of the collection of poems by Lukijan Mušicki Stihotvorenija (1844)

The creation of the National Library of Serbia began in 1837, with the personal library of Lukijan Mušicki.

== Poetry ==
Jovan Skerlić describes Mušicki as the first (modern) artistic poet in Serbian literature. Mušicki published his verses in occasional booklets and in newspaper articles and magazines. His collected works, Lutan Mušicki's Stihotvoršl were published after his death in four books: the first two in Buda, in 1838 and 1840, the second two in Novi Sad, in 1844 and 1847.

Mušicki began to write early and introduced a new direction into Serbian poetry, the pseudo-classical one, which was spreading in Europe after the Restoration, evidently most prominent in Hungarian and Russian literature of the 18th century. As a poet, Mušicki belongs entirely to the classical school. When he was a student in Budapest, Hungarian literature had been swept by pseudo-classicism. Johann Ludwig von Schedius (1768-1847), a student of German philosophers, his professor of aesthetics and philosophy at the University of Pest, and a zealous supporter of classical art, had a great influence on his literary development. Mušicki received all his literary ideas from him. Guided in this direction, he especially studied Klopstock and the "German Horace" of Karl Wilhelm Ramler. He learned Latin and Greek fluently, and upon becoming a monk, took the name Lucian of Samosata. The preserved list of his library clearly shows how extensive and deep his literary and philosophical education was. There are not only all the major writers of Greek and Latin antiquity, but also modern ones, from the Germans: Herder, Hegel, Kant, Mendelssohn, Klopstock, Goethe, Wieland, Schiller; from the French: Bossier, Moliere, Boileau, La Fontaine, Voltaire, Helvetius, Diderot, Condillac; from the English: Shakespeare, Goldsmith, Pope; from the Italians: Dante, Ariosto, Tasso, Boccaccio, Goldoni; from the Russians: Lomonosov, Derzhavin, Trediakovsky. Mušicki was certainly the most educated Serbian writer of his time.

Horace was his main model, and he knew De arte poetica by heart. He counts three poets among his "favorites": the "psalmist" David, Klopstock, then the celebrated German poet of the Messiah, and his "dear Horace", as he affectionately called him. He translates Horace's verses, in addition to those of Anacreon and Cato. At one point, he intended to translate all of Horace's poems, and he translated so much of him that Metropolitan Stefan Stratimirović threatened to excommunicate him from the church if he continued to translate a "heathen". As Horace, he is appropriate, writes flattering praises and dedications, and Jernej Kopitar writes to him on this occasion: "I wish you were as proud as Klopstock, and not as wooed as Horace and Virgil."

== Legacy ==
In 1828, at 51, Lukijan became a bishop. He was made the bishop of the Diocese of Upper Karlovci. He lived there for the rest of his life. He died at age 60, while bishop of Upper Karlovac, at his home, where he rests in the Serbian cemetery in Sremski Karlovci, on 15 March 1837.

Lukijan Mušicki is best known for his classical poetry. He was a translator of many works from the Latin poet Horace. Most of his other writings included newspaper articles about literature. His poems are considered very important in Serbian literature from the 18th century. He was one of the first in his region to write in the vernacular, a trend of the times.

Lukijan Mušicki's collected poems and writings were published posthumously. They were called Lukijana Mušickog stihodvorenia. The first two books came out in Budapest in 1838 and 1840. Two more books were published in Novi Sad in 1844 and 1847. Mušicki is featured in a chapter in Jovan Skerlić's seminal work Istorija nove srpske književnosti, first published in 1914.
