= Edwin Andersson =

Swedish footballer

Personal information
- Full name: Edwin Samuel Andersson
- Date of birth: 7 November 2003 (age 23)
- Place of birth: Lerum, Sweden
- Position: Left winger

Youth career
- 2010–2016: Lerum
- 2016–2020: IFK Göteborg
- 2020–2022: Chelsea
- 2022–2024: Stoke City

International career^{‡}
Years	Team	Apps	(Gls)
2018	Sweden U15	4	(0)
2019	Sweden U16	5	(0)
2019	Sweden U17	3	(3)
2021	Sweden U18	2	(0)
2021–	Sweden U19	2	(0)
- ‡ National team caps and goals as of 4 June 2022

Edwin Andersson (born 7 November 2003) is a Swedish professional footballer who plays as a left winger.

== Early life ==
Born in Lerum, Västergötland, Edwin Andersson started playing football in his hometown club as a six year old, before joining the IFK Göteborg Academy four years later.

== Club career ==
Soon proving to be one of the academy and Swedish football's brightest prospects, along the likes of Jesper Tolinsson, Andersson was linked to several big European clubs, making a trial at Manchester United in 2018, but eventually signing for the Chelsea Academy, that he effectively joined soon after he turned 16.

First playing with Chelsea's under-18, he began regularly scoring goals and delivering assist for his team in the FA Youth Cup and the U18 Premier League, whilst also playing the UEFA Youth League during the 2021–22 season, most notably delivering a total of three assists in the two games against the Swedish champions of Malmö. In October 2021, he also made his EFL Trophy debut against Cheltenham. On 12 August 2022, Andersson announced his departure from Chelsea.

Andersson joined Stoke City on 15 August 2022 linking up with their under-21 team.

== International career ==
Edwin Andersson has been part of every Swedish youth team, having played 12 games with the under-17, scoring three goals during the three Euro qualifying games in 2019, before the event was canceled due to COVID-19.

== Style of play ==
Primarily operating as a left winger, Edwin Andersson is a left-footed player who has drawn comparisons to Callum Hudson-Odoi. He looks to Cristiano Ronaldo as his primary footballing inspiration.
