= Ludvig Nåvik =

Swedish footballer (born 2003)

Personal information
- Full name: Ludvig Carl William Nåvik
- Date of birth: 2 November 2003 (age 23)
- Place of birth: Sundsvall, Sweden
- Height: 1.84 m (6 ft 0 in)
- Position: Central midfielder

Team information
- Current team: GIF Sundsvall
- Number: 21

Youth career
- –2017: Alnö IF
- 2018–2019: GIF Sundsvall

Senior career*
Years	Team	Apps	(Gls)
2020–2023	GIF Sundsvall	77	(1)
2024	Umeå FC	13	(2)
2024	→ Umeå FC Akademi	1	(0)
2024	→ FBK Karlstad (loan)	11	(1)
2025	Oskarshamns AIK	30	(5)
2026	Strømmen IF	10	(1)
2026–	GIF Sundsvall	12	(0)

International career^{‡}
2018	Sweden U15	2	(1)
2019	Sweden U16	8	(3)
2019–2020	Sweden U17	6	(1)
2021	Sweden U18	2	(0)
2021–2022	Sweden U19	6	(0)
2023	Sweden U20	1	(0)
- * Club domestic league appearances and goals as of 12 November 2026 ‡ National team caps and goals as of 31 August 2026

Ludvig Nåvik (born 2 November 2003) is a Swedish footballer who plays as a midfielder for GIF Sundsvall.

== Career ==
Born in Sundsvall, he started playing for Alnö IF as a child before joining GIF Sundsvall in 2018. Nåvik made his international debut for Sweden U15 in a double fixture against Norway U15 in September 2018. He scored during the 2020 UEFA European Under-17 Championship qualification, which was cancelled before the elite round because of COVID-19.

He signed a first-team contract with GIF Sundsvall in January 2020, extending it in 2022. There were few regular players younger than Nåvik in the 2022 Allsvenskan, but he managed to take the Studenten, graduating from high school.

Nåvik spent the year 2024 in Umeå FC as well as on loan in FBK Karlstad. When signing for Oskarshamns AIK in 2025, the club described Nåvik as "overqualified" for playing on the third tier. His role in Oskarshamn was that of play-builder in midfield. He also scored a career-best of 5 goals during a season.

Following his strong season, Nåvik was reportedly sought after by IFK Mariehamn, AF Elbasani and Swedish clubs. Norwegian second-tier club Strømmen IF managed to sign Nåvik in January 2026, a step upwards, especially since Oskarshamn were relegated to the fourth tier. His sole Strømmen goal came in a 5–4 victory over Åsane. In the summer of 2026, GIF Sundsvall wanted him back in an effort to avoid relegation from the 2026 Superettan, and managed to secure his return on 30 July.
