= Filip Panjeskovic =

Danish footballer (born 2003)

Personal information
- Date of birth: 16 January 2003 (age 23)
- Place of birth: Hillerød, Denmark
- Position: Centre-back

Youth career
- Hillerød
- 2017–2020: Lyngby

Senior career*
Years	Team	Apps	(Gls)
2020–2022	Lyngby	1	(0)
2022–2024	Hillerød	7	(0)

International career
2018–2019	Denmark U16	7	(1)
2019–2020	Denmark U17	9	(2)
2020	Denmark U18	2	(0)
- * Club domestic league appearances and goals as of 17 June 2023

Filip Panjeskovic (born 16 January 2003) is a Danish professional footballer who plays as a centre-back.

== Club career ==
=== Lyngby ===
Born in Hillerød, Panjeskovic played youth football for Hillerød Fodbold and attended folkeskole at Hillerødsholmskolen. In 2017, he moved to the Lyngby Boldklub youth academy.

He made his Danish Superliga debut for Lyngby on 8 July 2020 in a game against SønderjyskE. In October 2020, Panjeskovic suffered a season-ending knee injury. He suffered relegation to the Danish 1st Division with the club on 9 May 2021 after a loss to last placed AC Horsens.

On 28 May 2022, Lyngby Boldklub announced that Panjeskovic's expiring contract would not be extended, making him a free agent after the 2021–22 season.

=== Hillerød ===
Panjeskovic returned to his former club Hillerød prior to the 2022–23 season, the club's inaugural season in the 1st Division after winning promotion. He made his debut on 30 July 2022, coming on as a half-time substitute for Lucas Lykkegaard in a 5–1 loss to SønderjyskE.

Panjeskovic left Hillerød at the end of the 2023–24 season.

== Career statistics ==
As of match played 8 August 2023

Appearances and goals by club, season and competition
Club	Season	League			Danish Cup		Other		Total	
Club	Season	Division	Apps	Goals	Apps	Goals	Apps	Goals	Apps	Goals
Lyngby	2019–20	Superliga	1	0	0	0	—		1	0
Lyngby	2020–21	Superliga	0	0	1	0	—		1	0
Lyngby	2021–22	1st Division	0	0	0	0	—		0	0
Lyngby	Total		1	0	1	0	—		2	0
Hillerød	2022–23	1st Division	7	0	0	0	—		7	0
Hillerød	2023–24	1st Division	0	0	1	0	—		1	0
Hillerød	Total		7	0	1	0	—		8	0
Career total			8	0	2	0	—		10	0
