= Christos Liatsos =

Greek professional footballer

Personal information
- Date of birth: 1 September 2003 (age 23)
- Place of birth: Athens, Greece
- Height: 1.78 m (5 ft 10 in)
- Position: Midfielder

Team information
- Current team: Olympiacos B
- Number: 55

Youth career
- 2012–2021: Olympiacos

Senior career*
Years	Team	Apps	(Gls)
2019–	Olympiacos	0	(0)
2021–2024	Olympiacos B	42	(4)
2024–2025	→ Chania (loan)	19	(0)
2025–	Olympiacos B	19	(1)

International career^{‡}
2019–2020	Greece U17	11	(5)
2021	Greece U19	2	(0)
2023	Greece U21	2	(0)
- * Club domestic league appearances and goals as of 20:00, 13 September 2026 (UTC) ‡ National team caps and goals as of 20:00, 28 March 2023 (UTC)

Christos Liatsos (Greek: Χρήστος Λιάτσος; born 1 September 2003) is a Greek professional footballer who plays as a midfielder for Super League 2 club Olympiacos B.

== Career statistics ==
=== Club ===
As of 19 March 2022.

Club	Season	League			Cup		Continental		Other		Total	
Club	Season	Division	Apps	Goals	Apps	Goals	Apps	Goals	Apps	Goals	Apps	Goals
Olympiacos	2019–20	Super League Greece	0	0	1 (Note: Appearances in the Greek Cup)	0	–		0	0	1	0
Olympiacos	2020-21	Super League Greece	0	0	0	0	0	0	0	0	0	0
Olympiacos	2021-22	Super League Greece	0	0	0	0	0	0	0	0	0	0
Olympiacos B	2021-22	Super League 2	19	0	0	0	0	0	0	0	19	0
Career total			19	0	1	0	0	0	0	0	20	0

Notes

Honours

- Greek Cup : 2019-20
