= Garrik Levin =

Russian footballer

Personal information
- Full name: Garrik Rudolfovich Levin
- Date of birth: 31 January 2003 (age 23)
- Place of birth: Chelyabinsk, Russia
- Height: 1.77 m (5 ft 9 1/2 in)
- Position: Midfielder

Team information
- Current team: Chelyabinsk
- Number: 70

Youth career
- Chertanovo

Senior career*
Years	Team	Apps	(Gls)
2020–2024	Chertanovo Moscow	83	(17)
2023–2024	→ Kuban Krasnodar	33	(4)
2024–	Chelyabinsk	62	(13)

International career^{‡}
2018	Russia U-15	5	(1)
2018–2019	Russia U-16	14	(0)
2019–2020	Russia U-17	7	(1)
2021	Russia U-18	2	(0)
2021	Russia U-19	4	(0)
- * Club domestic league appearances and goals as of 16 May 2026 ‡ National team caps and goals as of 9 October 2021

Garrik Rudolfovich Levin (Russian: Гаррик Рудольфович Левин; born 31 January 2003) is a Russian football player who plays for Chelyabinsk.

== Club career ==
He made his debut in the Russian Football National League for Chertanovo Moscow on 22 August 2020 in a game against Neftekhimik Nizhnekamsk.
