= Eskild Dall =

Danish footballer (born 2003)

Personal information
- Date of birth: 8 January 2003 (age 23)
- Place of birth: Aalborg, Denmark
- Position: Forward

Team information
- Current team: Fredericia
- Number: 19

Youth career
- 2008–2020: Silkeborg
- 2020–2022: Ajax
- 2022–2023: Brøndby

Senior career*
Years	Team	Apps	(Gls)
2022	Ajax	0	(0)
2022	→ AGF (loan)	1	(0)
2023–	Fredericia	72	(6)
- * Club domestic league appearances and goals as of 19 May 2026

Eskild Dall (born 8 January 2003) is a Danish footballer who plays as a forward for FC Fredericia in the Danish Superliga.

== Career ==
Dall started his career with Dutch top flight side Ajax. Before the second half of 2021–22, he was sent on loan to AGF in Denmark. On 10 April 2022, Dall debuted for AGF during a 2–2 draw with FCN.
