= Lucas Lykkegaard =

Danish footballer (born 2002)

Personal information
- Date of birth: 5 April 2002 (age 24)
- Place of birth: Farum, Denmark
- Height: 1.76 m (5 ft 9 in)
- Position: Right-back

Team information
- Current team: University of Rhode Island
- Number: 15

Youth career
- 2006–2020: Nordsjælland

College career
Years	Team	Apps	(Gls)
2024–	University of Rhode Island	15	(1)

Senior career*
Years	Team	Apps	(Gls)
2020–2023	Nordsjælland	3	(0)
2022	→ Hillerød (loan)	3	(0)
2023	HIK	15	(0)
2024	Værløse		

International career
2017–2018	Denmark U16	6	(0)
2020	Denmark U20	1	(0)
- * Club domestic league appearances and goals as of 18:38, 10 September 2024 (UTC)

Lucas Lykkegaard (born 5 April 2002) is a Danish professional footballer who plays college soccer as a right-back for University of Rhode Island.

== Club career ==
Lykkegaard was born and raised in Farum to a Danish father and Chilean mother and is a product of FC Nordsjælland, where he started when he was four years old. In his first season as U17 player, Lykkegaard was injured with an anterior cruciate ligament injury and was out for about a year and a half.

After 14 years at the club, Lykkegaard was promoted to the first-team squad, where he made his professional debut in the Danish Superliga against FC Copenhagen on 13 December 2020. Lykkegaard started on the bench, before replacing Daniel Svensson in the 78th minute. Lykkegaard also played in the following league game against FC Midtjylland. Those two games were his only appearances in the 2020–21 season. On 21 July 2022, Lykkegaard signed a new deal with Nordsjælland until June 2025 and was loaned out to newly promoted Danish 1st Division club Hillerød. He returned to Nordsjælland in November 2022, having made four appearances for Hillerød.

By mutual agreement, Lykkegaard and Nordsjælland decided in early August 2023 to end the collaboration and he left the club.

=== HIK ===
On 4 August 2023, Lykkegaard joined Danish 2nd Division club HIK. In early January, it was announced that Lykkegaard had left HIK and that he would stop playing football for a while due to education.

=== Later career ===
Despite announcing that he would take a break from football, Lykkegaard started up again later that month - in January 2024 - but at a lower level when he signed with Værløse Boldklub.

In August 2024, Lykkegaard traveled to the United States to study psychology at the University of Rhode Island and play football for the university. After a season that saw him make 15 appearances, 11 of which were starts, and score one goal, Lykkegaard was rewarded by the 2024 Atlantic 10 Men's Soccer All-Conference Team at the end of the season when he was named to the All-Rookie Team.

== Career statistics ==
As of match played 5 August 2022

Appearances and goals by club, season and competition
Club	Season	League			Danish Cup		Other		Total	
Club	Season	Division	Apps	Goals	Apps	Goals	Apps	Goals	Apps	Goals
Nordsjælland	2020–21	Superliga	2	0	0	0	—		2	0
Nordsjælland	2021–22	Superliga	1	0	0	0	—		1	0
Nordsjælland	2022–23	Superliga	0	0	0	0	—		0	0
Nordsjælland	Total		3	0	0	0	0	0	3	0
Hillerød (loan)	2022–23	1st Division	3	0	1	0	—		4	0
Career total			6	0	1	0	0	0	7	0
