= Adrián Macejko =

Slovak football midfielder

Personal information
- Full name: Adrián Macejko
- Date of birth: 26 April 2003 (age 23)
- Place of birth: Slovakia
- Height: 1.77 m (5 ft 10 in)
- Position: Midfielder

Team information
- Current team: Liptovský Mikuláš
- Number: 7

Youth career
- 2011–2013: OTJ Jamník
- 2013–2018: Noves Spišská Nová Ves
- 2018–2022: Ružomberok

Senior career*
Years	Team	Apps	(Gls)
2021–2025	Ružomberok	20	(1)
2023–2025	→ Liptovský Mikuláš (loan)	47	(9)
2025–	Liptovský Mikuláš	25	(1)

International career^{‡}
2019–2020	Slovakia U17	4	(1)
2021–	Slovakia U19	2	(0)
- * Club domestic league appearances and goals as of 25 May 2026 ‡ National team caps and goals as of 14:17, 10 June 2022 (UTC)

Adrián Macejko (born 26 April 2003) is a Slovak professional footballer who plays as a midfielder for Liptovský Mikuláš.

== Club career ==
=== MFK Ružomberok ===
Macejko made his Fortuna Liga debut for Ružomberok against Spartak Trnava at Anton Malatinský Stadium on 24 April 2022, replacing Martin Regáli.
