= Yuliy Kuznetsov =

Belarusian footballer

Personal information
- Date of birth: 2 August 2003 (age 23)
- Place of birth: Novopolotsk, Vitebsk Oblast, Belarus
- Height: 1.78 m (5 ft 10 in)
- Position: Midfielder

Team information
- Current team: Slavia Mozyr
- Number: 6

Youth career
- 2018–2021: Minsk

Senior career*
Years	Team	Apps	(Gls)
2021–2023	Minsk	45	(0)
2022	→ Naftan Novopolotsk (loan)	15	(1)
2024–	Slavia Mozyr	52	(1)

International career^{‡}
2019	Belarus U17	3	(1)
2021	Belarus U19	3	(0)
2022–2023	Belarus U21	9	(1)
- * Club domestic league appearances and goals as of 6 July 2026 ‡ National team caps and goals as of 20 November 2023

Yuliy Kuznetsov (Belarusian: Юлій Кузняцоў; Russian: Юлий Кузнецов; born 2 August 2003) is a Belarusian footballer who plays for Slavia Mozyr.
