= João Resende =

Portuguese footballer (born 2003)

Personal information
- Full name: João Pedro Moreira Resende
- Date of birth: 26 March 2003 (age 23)
- Place of birth: Guimarães, Portugal
- Height: 1.81 m (5 ft 11 in)
- Position: Forward

Team information
- Current team: Farense
- Number: 7

Youth career
- 2011–2013: Fafe
- 2013–2015: CB Póvoa Lanhoso
- 2015–2019: Vitória Guimarães
- 2019–2022: Benfica

Senior career*
Years	Team	Apps	(Gls)
2021–2023	Benfica B	20	(3)
2023–2025	União de Leiria	36	(3)
2024	→ Académica (loan)	8	(0)
2025–2026	Estrela da Amadora	2	(0)
2025–2026	→ Pontevedra (loan)	34	(6)
2026–	Farense	5	(0)

International career^{‡}
2018	Portugal U15	4	(4)
2019	Portugal U16	9	(3)
2019–2020	Portugal U17	7	(2)
2021	Portugal U19	1	(1)
2022	Portugal U20	2	(1)
- * Club domestic league appearances and goals as of 13 September 2026 ‡ National team caps and goals as of 22 November 2022

João Pedro Moreira Resende (born 26 March 2003) is a Portuguese professional footballer who plays as a forward for Liga Portugal 2 club Farense.

== Club career ==
In July 2023, Resende left Benfica's B team and signed a three-year contract with Liga Portugal 2 club União de Leiria.

On 31 January 2024, Leiria sent Resende on loan to Liga 3 club Académica until the end of the 2023–24 season.

On 1 July 2025, Resende signed a three-year contract with Estrela da Amadora. After making his top-level debut with late-substitute appearances in two opening games of the 2025–26 Primeira Liga for Estrela, on 1 September 2025 he was loaned to Pontevedra in Spanish third-tier Primera Federación.

== International career ==
Resende has represented Portugal at youth international level.

== Career statistics ==
=== Club ===
As of 30 August 2021

Appearances and goals by club, season and competition
Club	Season	League			National cup		League cup		Other		Total	
Club	Season	Division	Apps	Goals	Apps	Goals	Apps	Goals	Apps	Goals	Apps	Goals
Benfica B	2021–22	Liga Portugal 2	1	0	–		–		0	0	1	0
Career total			1	0	0	0	0	0	0	0	1	0

== Honours ==
Benfica

- Campeonato Nacional de Juniores: 2021–22
- UEFA Youth League: 2021–22
- Under-20 Intercontinental Cup: 2022
