= Filip Uriča =

Czech footballer

Personal information
- Date of birth: 10 September 2003 (age 23)
- Height: 1.80 m (5 ft 11 in)
- Position: Midfielder

Team information
- Current team: Sigma Olomouc
- Number: 27

Youth career
- 2011–2016: Viktorie Přerov
- 2016–2021: Sigma Olomouc

Senior career*
Years	Team	Apps	(Gls)
2021–	Sigma Olomouc	5	(0)
2021–	Sigma Olomouc B	50	(10)

International career^{‡}
2018–2019	Czech Republic U16	4	(1)
2019	Czech Republic U17	3	(1)
2021–	Czech Republic U19	7	(1)
- * Club domestic league appearances and goals as of 25 May 2023 ‡ National team caps and goals as of 18:44, 10 November 2021 (UTC)

Filip Uriča (born 10 September 2003) is a Czech footballer who currently plays as a midfielder for Sigma Olomouc.

== Career statistics ==
=== Club ===
As of 10 November 2021.

Club	Season	League			Cup		Continental		Other		Total	
Club	Season	Division	Apps	Goals	Apps	Goals	Apps	Goals	Apps	Goals	Apps	Goals
Sigma Olomouc	2020–21	Fortuna liga	1	0	0	0	–		0	0	1	0
Sigma Olomouc	2021–22	Fortuna liga	0	0	0	0	–		0	0	0	0
Sigma Olomouc	Total		1	0	0	0	0	0	0	0	1	0
Sigma Olomouc B	2021–22	ČFL	9	4	–		–		0	0	9	4
Career total			10	4	0	0	0	0	0	0	10	4
