= Emir Saitoski =

Association football player (born 2003)

Personal information
- Date of birth: 8 May 2003 (age 23)
- Height: 1.76 m (5 ft 9 in)
- Position: Winger

Team information
- Current team: Gwangju FC
- Number: 7

Youth career
- –2018: Olimpija Ljubljana
- 2018–2022: Domžale

Senior career*
Years	Team	Apps	(Gls)
2020–2023	Domžale	33	(1)
2023–2024	Mura	5	(1)
2024–2026	Aluminij	48	(14)
2026–	Gwangju FC	0	(0)

International career
2019	North Macedonia U17	3	(4)
2021	North Macedonia U19	6	(0)
2022–2023	Slovenia U21	5	(0)
- * Club domestic league appearances and goals as of 26 June 2026

Emir Saitoski (Macedonian: Емир Саитоски; born 8 May 2003) is a footballer who plays as a winger for K League 1 club Gwangju FC. Initially a youth international for North Macedonia, he switched his national allegiance to Slovenia in 2022.

== Personal life ==
Saitoski spent his youth in Prilep, Macedonia, and moved to Slovenia with his father when he was around 13 years old to pursue football career.

== Career statistics ==
=== Club ===
As of 3 July 2023

Appearances and goals by club, season and competition
Club	Season	League			National cup		Continental		Total	
Club	Season	Division	Apps	Goals	Apps	Goals	Apps	Goals	Apps	Goals
Domžale	2019–20	1. SNL	1	0	0	0	0	0	1	0
Domžale	2020–21	1. SNL	3	0	1	0	—		4	0
Domžale	2021–22	1. SNL	11	1	0	0	2 (Note: Appearances in UEFA Europa Conference League)	0	13	1
Domžale	2022–23	1. SNL	18	0	2	1	—		20	1
Domžale	Total		33	1	3	1	2	0	38	2
Career total			33	1	3	1	2	0	38	2
