= Tatiana Cotliar =

Argentine fashion model and stylist

Tati Cotliar
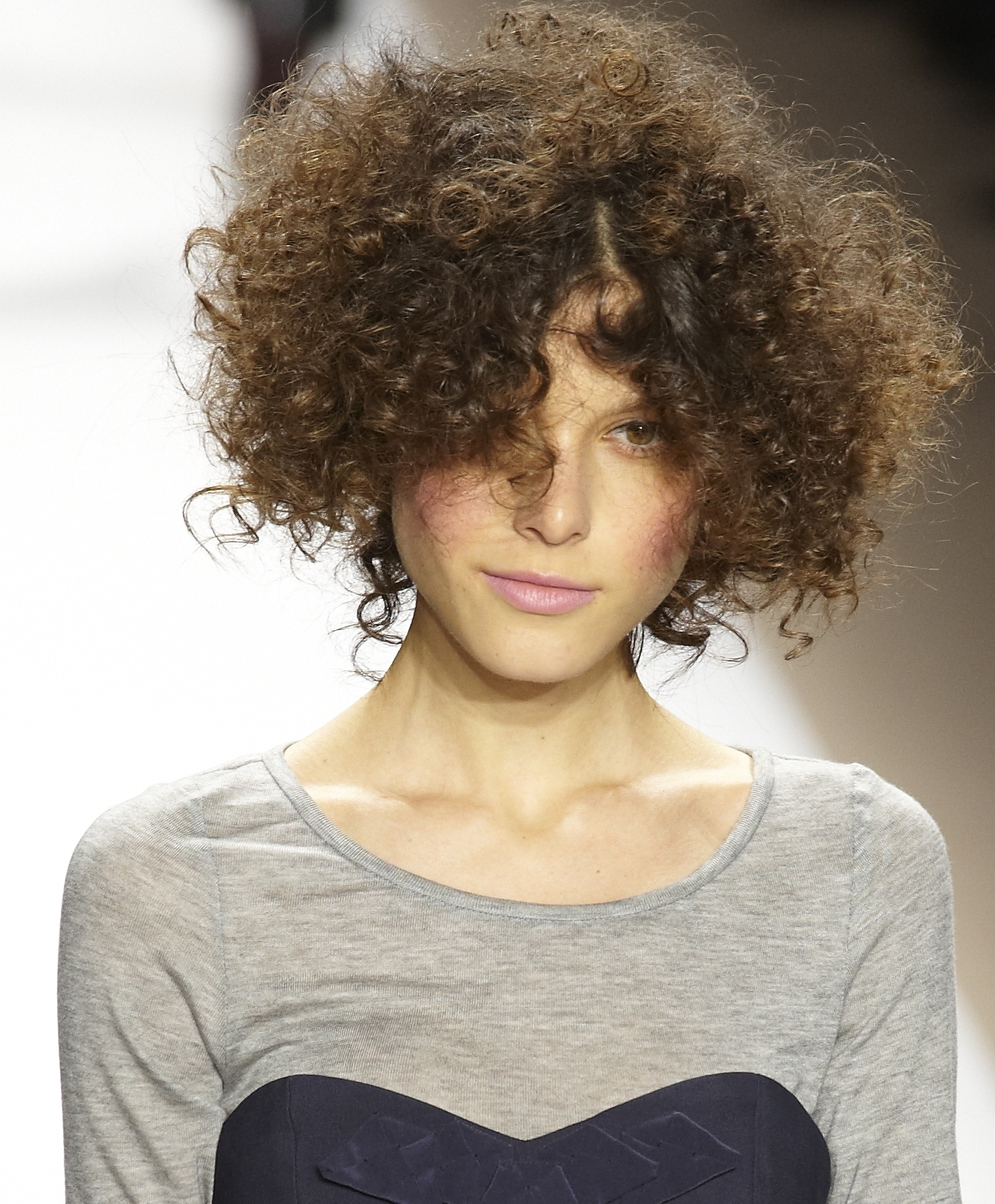
- Cotliar walks for Tibi in 2010
- Born: Tatiana Cotliar; 31 October 1988 (age 37); Buenos Aires, Argentina
- Modelling information
- Height: 5 ft 10 in (1.78 m)
- Hair colour: Brown
- Eye colour: Hazel
- Agency: NEXT New York

Tatiana "Tati" Cotliar (born 31 October 1988) is an Argentine fashion model and stylist. Born in Buenos Aires, she has been the face of Vivienne Westwood, Valentino, Versace, Proenza Schouler, Prada, Lanvin for H&M, Mulberry, Paul Smith, Marc Jacobs, and Nina Ricci.

== Career ==
Cotliar was a high school student at Colegio Nacional de Buenos Aires, then at CIEVYC, a cinema school in Buenos Aires. She has directed two short films. When an agent approached her to model, knowing only the modeling of Argentina, she was not interested due to how commercial it was. In September 2009, Cotliar debuted at the spring Rachel Comey show in New York, then walked for Jason Wu, 3.1 Phillip Lim, and Rodarte. She closed the spring Vivienne Westwood Red Label show in London as well closing for Westwood in Paris. Having modeled for about a year, she received her major breakthrough as the opener for one of Marc Jacobs' most critically acclaimed collections, the Fall 2010 show in New York. She opened Vivienne Westwood's fall show in Paris and closed for Shiatzy Chen, Miu Miu and Emanuel Ungaro.

COACD featured Cotliar in the top-ten newcomers of the F/W 2010 season at No.2

== Personal life ==
She describes her personal style as boyish, like Diane Keaton in Annie Hall, and sometimes sexy and feminine like Jane Birkin. Her favourite places to visit are Chinatown in New York, the Shoreditch area of London, the corner cafés of Paris, and Buenos Aires.
