= Viktor Kanižaj =

Croatian footballer (born 2003)

Personal information
- Date of birth: 2 February 2003 (age 23)
- Place of birth: Čakovec, Croatia
- Position: Right winger

Team information
- Current team: Sesvete
- Number: 18

Youth career
- –2015: Međimurje
- 2015–2023: Dinamo Zagreb

Senior career*
| Years | Team | Apps | (Gls) |
| 2022 | Dinamo Zagreb II | 2 | (0) |
| 2023–2024 | Lokomotiva Zagreb | 11 | (0) |
| 2024 | Inter Turku | 6 | (0) |
| 2024 | Inter Turku II | 1 | (0) |
| 2025– | Sesvete | 25 | (2) |

International career^{‡}
| 2018–2019 | Croatia U16 | 9 | (1) |
| 2018–2020 | Croatia U17 | 16 | (3) |
- * Club domestic league appearances and goals as of 16 June 2026 ‡ National team caps and goals as of 6 October 2024

Viktor Kanižaj (born 2 February 2003) is a Croatian professional footballer who plays as a right winger for Prva NL club Sesvete.

== Club career ==
Kanižaj played in the youth sector of Međimurje before joining the academy of Dinamo Zagreb in 2015, and making his senior debut with the club's reserve team in 2022.

In the 2023–24 season, he played for Lokomotiva Zagreb in top-tier Croatian Football League.

On 29 August 2024, Kanižaj moved to Finland and signed with Inter Turku in the country's top-tier Veikkausliiga.

== Career statistics ==
As of 28 June 2025

Appearances and goals by club, season and competition
| Club | Season | League | | | National cup (Note: Includes Croatian Cup) | | League cup | | Europe | | Total | |
| Club | Season | Division | Apps | Goals | Apps | Goals | Apps | Goals | Apps | Goals | Apps | Goals |
|---|---|---|---|---|---|---|---|---|---|---|---|---|
| Dinamo Zagreb II | 2021–22 | Prva NL | 2 | 0 | 0 | 0 | – | | – | | 2 | 0 |
| Lokomotiva Zagreb | 2023–24 | HNL | 11 | 0 | 1 | 0 | – | | – | | 12 | 0 |
| Inter Turku | 2024 | Veikkausliiga | 6 | 0 | 0 | 0 | 0 | 0 | – | | 6 | 0 |
| Inter Turku II | 2024 | Kakkonen | 1 | 0 | – | | – | | – | | 1 | 0 |
| Sesvete | 2024–25 | Prva NL | 6 | 1 | 0 | 0 | – | | – | | 6 | 1 |
| Career total | | | 26 | 1 | 1 | 0 | 0 | 0 | 0 | 0 | 27 | 1 |

== Honours ==
Dinamo Zagreb II

- 1. HNL Juniori: 2022–23
