= Marián Šmatlák =

Slovak youth international footballer

Personal information
- Full name: Marián Šmatlák
- Date of birth: 23 May 2003 (age 23)
- Place of birth: Nitra, Slovakia
- Height: 1.80 m (5 ft 11 in)
- Position: Attacking midfielder

Team information
- Current team: OFK Baník Lehota pod Vtáčnikom
- Number: 99

Youth career
- –2011: Topvar Topoľčany
- 2011–2020: Nitra

Senior career*
Years	Team	Apps	(Gls)
2020–2021	ViOn Zlaté Moravce	11	(0)
2021–2022	Pohronie	18	(0)
2023	Riteriai	10	(0)
2024–2025	Zvolen	7	(0)
2025-	OFK Baník Lehota pod Vtáčnikom	0	(0)

International career^{‡}
2019–2020	Slovakia U17	6	(1)
2021	Slovakia U18	2	(0)
2021–	Slovakia U19	2	(0)
- * Club domestic league appearances and goals as of 2 January 2025 ‡ National team caps and goals as of 12:00, 24 June 2021 (UTC)

Marián Šmatlák (born 23 May 2003) is a Slovak professional footballer who plays as an attacking midfielder for OFK Baník Lehota pod Vtáčnikom.

== Club career ==
=== ViOn Zlaté Moravce ===
Šmatlák made his Fortuna Liga debut for ViOn Zlaté Moravce against Spartak Trnava on 19 September 2020. In May 2021, ViOn had released Šmatlák from a three-year contract due to apparent pressures from his agent to influence the manager Ľuboš Benkovský to improve Šmatlák's role in the team.

=== Pohronie ===
On 24 June 2021, Pohronie have announced the signing of Šmatlák, who arrived as a free transfer.

=== Riteriai ===
On 1 February 2023 announced that FK Riteriai signed with Marián Šmatlák. On 3 March 2023 he made his debut in A Lyga against FA Šiauliai.

On 16 November 2023 was announced, that player left Riteriai Club.
