= Ramën Çepele =

Italian-born Albanian footballer

Personal information
- Date of birth: 21 March 2003 (age 23)
- Place of birth: Conegliano, Italy
- Height: 1.90 m (6 ft 3 in)
- Position: Centre-back

Youth career
- –2017: A.S.D. Liventina
- 2017–2020: Inter Milan
- 2020–2022: Hannover 96

Senior career*
Years	Team	Apps	(Gls)
2021–2023	Hannover 96 II	4	(0)

International career^{‡}
2018	Italy U15	7	(0)
2018–2019	Italy U16	9	(0)
2019–2020	Italy U17	6	(2)
2020	Albania	1	(0)
- * Club domestic league appearances and goals as of 09:22, 12 June 2024 (UTC) ‡ National team caps and goals as of 14:32, 11 November 2020 (UTC)

Ramën Çepele (born 21 March 2003) is a footballer who most recently played as a centre-back for Hannover 96 II. Born in Italy, he began his youth international career with Italy before switching to represent the Albania national team.

== Club career ==
Çepele played at A.S.D. Liventina in his youth, before joining the Inter Milan youth academy in 2017. In 2020, he moved to the under-19 team of German club Hannover 96.

== International career ==
Çepele made his senior international debut for Albania on 11 November 2020 in a friendly match against Kosovo, at age of just 17 years plus 7 months and 21 days, becoming the youngest ever player of the national side.

== Career statistics ==
=== International ===
As of 11 November 2020

Albania
Year	Apps	Goals
2020	1	0
Total	1	0
