= Georgios Syrmis =

Greek professional footballer

Personal information
- Date of birth: 24 March 2003 (age 23)
- Place of birth: Patras, Greece
- Height: 1.83 m (6 ft 0 in)
- Position: Midfielder

Team information
- Current team: Iraklis Xylokastro

Youth career
- 2017–2022: Olympiacos

Senior career*
Years	Team	Apps	(Gls)
2022–2024	Olympiacos B	13	(0)
2024–2025	Panegialios	19	(0)
2025–2026	Panachaiki		
2026–	Iraklis Xylokastro		

International career^{‡}
2019–2020	Greece U17	5	(1)
- * Club domestic league appearances and goals as of 28 October 2023 ‡ National team caps and goals as of 16 January 2020

Georgios Syrmis (Greek: Γεώργιος Συρμής; born 24 March 2003) is a Greek professional footballer who plays as a midfielder for Gamma Ethniki club Iraklis Xylokastro.
