= Andreas Bredahl =

Danish footballer (born 2003)

Personal information
- Full name: Andreas Pedersen Bredahl
- Date of birth: 13 March 2003 (age 23)
- Place of birth: Kirke Hvalsø, Denmark
- Position: Left winger

Team information
- Current team: Fremad Amager
- Number: 20

Youth career
- Hvalsø IF
- Nordsjælland

Senior career*
Years	Team	Apps	(Gls)
2020–2022	Nordsjælland	9	(0)
2022–2024	Vejle	4	(0)
2023–2024	→ Nykøbing (loan)	25	(2)
2024–2026	B.93	7	(1)
2026–	Fremad Amager	24	(6)

International career
2018–2019	Denmark U16	9	(4)
2019–2020	Denmark U17	9	(7)
- * Club domestic league appearances and goals as of 3 October 2026

Andreas Pedersen Bredahl (born 13 March 2003) is a Danish professional footballer who plays as a winger for Danish 2nd Division club Fremad Amager.

== Club career ==
He made his Danish Superliga debut for FC Nordsjælland on 17 July 2020 in a game against FC Midtjylland.

After leaving Nordsjælland, as his contract came to an end, it was confirmed on 20 June 2022, that Bredahl had signed a contract until June 2025 with newly relegated Danish 1st Division club Vejle Boldklub. After Vejle's promotion back to the 2023-24 Danish Superliga, Bredahl did not get much playing time at the start of the season, which is why on 2 September 2023, he moved to Danish 2nd Division club Nykøbing FC on a loan deal for the rest of the season. In the summer of 2024, Bredahl was back in Vejle. At the end of July 2024, Vejle confirmed that Bredahl was training with B.93 and on 20 August 2024, Vejle terminated Bredahl's contract by mutual agreement.

On 22 August 2024, the Danish 1st Division side B.93 confirmed that they had signed Bredahl after a trial period.

On 31 January 2026, Andreas Bredahl joined Fremad Amager ahead of the spring season.

== Honours ==
Vejle

- Danish 1st Division: 2022–23
