= Apostolos Christopoulos =

Greek footballer (born 2003)

Personal information
- Date of birth: 29 January 2003 (age 23)
- Place of birth: Greece
- Height: 1.86 m (6 ft 1 in)
- Positions: Second striker; right winger

Team information
- Current team: A.E. Kifisia
- Number: 72

Youth career
- 2015–2021: AEK Athens

Senior career*
| Years | Team | Apps | (Gls) |
| 2021–2024 | AEK Athens B | 54 | (12) |
| 2024– | A.E. Kifisia | 26 | (3) |
| 2025 | → AEK Athens B (loan) | 6 | (0) |

International career^{‡}
| 2019 | Greece U17 | 3 | (2) |
| 2021 | Greece U19 | 4 | (0) |
- * Club domestic league appearances and goals as of 19 September 2026 ‡ National team caps and goals as of 5 June 2021

Apostolos Christopoulos (Greek: Απόστολος Χριστόπουλος; born 29 January 2003) is a Greek professional footballer who plays as a forward for Super League club A.E. Kifisia.
