= Ilias Kostis =

Greek footballer (born 2003)

Personal information
- Full name: Ilias Kostis
- Date of birth: 27 February 2003 (age 23)
- Place of birth: Thessaloniki, Greece
- Height: 1.88 m (6 ft 2 in)
- Position: Centre-back

Team information
- Current team: Castellón
- Number: 15

Youth career
- –2019: APOEL
- 2019–2022: Atlético Madrid

Senior career*
| Years | Team | Apps | (Gls) |
| 2022–2026 | Atlético Madrid B | 74 | (2) |
| 2023–2026 | Atlético Madrid | 0 | (0) |
| 2026– | Castellón | 1 | (0) |

International career^{‡}
| 2018 | Cyprus U16 | 2 | (0) |
| 2019 | Cyprus U17 | 3 | (1) |
| 2021 | Cyprus U19 | 6 | (0) |
| 2022–2023 | Cyprus U21 | 2 | (0) |
| 2023– | Greece U21 | 5 | (1) |
- * Club domestic league appearances and goals as of 17 October 2026 ‡ National team caps and goals as of 10 September 2024

Ilias Kostis (Greek: Ηλίας Κωστής; born 27 February 2003) is a Greek footballer who plays as a centre-back for Segunda División club Castellón.

== Club career ==
In 2019, Kostis joined the youth academy of Spanish La Liga side Atlético Madrid from APOEL. Promoted to the reserves in 2022, he quickly established himself as a starter before renewing his contract until 2027 on 9 February 2023.

After helping in the B-team's promotion to Primera Federación, Kostis made his first team debut with Atleti on 4 October 2023, coming on as a late substitute for goalscorer Álvaro Morata in a 3–2 UEFA Champions League win over Feyenoord. In December, however, he suffered a serious muscular injury which sidelined him for nearly six months.

Back to action in May 2024, Kostis regained his starting spot at the B's before suffering a knee injury in October 2025, being sidelined for the remainder of the season. On 31 July 2026, he signed a four-year deal with Segunda División side Castellón.

== International career ==
Born in Greece, Kostis represented Cyprus up to the under-21 level, before switching allegiance back to Greece to play for their own under-21 squad in 2023.
