= Kotlarz =

Kotlarz is a surname. Notable people with the surname include:

- Joe Kotlarz (born 1956), American lawyer and politician
- Roman Kotlarz (1928–1976), Polish Catholic priest and activist
