= Nammo Stadion =

Football stadium in Norway

- Interactive map of Nammo Stadion
- Location: Raufoss; Norway
- Coordinates: 60.7210°N 10.6026°E
- Capacity: 1,800
- Surface: Artificial turf
- Field size: 105 by 68 metres (114.8 yd × 74.4 yd)

Construction
- Built: 2015
- Opened: 13 June 2015
- Expanded: 2016

Tenant
- Raufoss Fotball (association football)

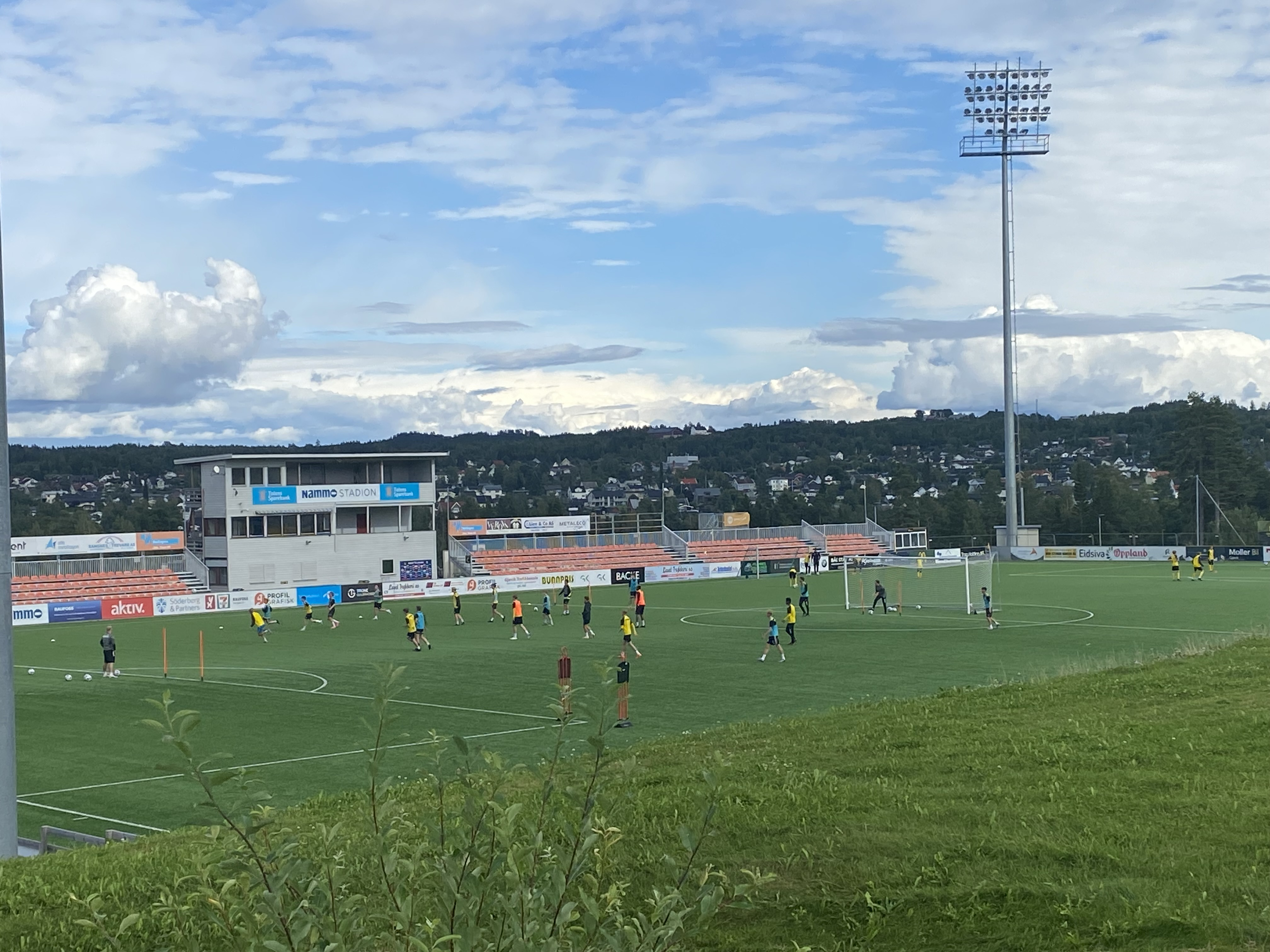
Nammo Stadion

Nammo Stadion is a football stadium located at Raufoss, Norway, and is the home of Norwegian 1. divisjon club Raufoss. The stadium has a current capacity of 1,800 spectators.

== History ==
Plans for a new stadium for Raufoss Fotball were announced as early as November 2006. The construction costs were estimated to NOK 25 million and the planned capacity was 6,000 of which 2,000 were seated. Problems with funding delayed the project several years, and in 2014, Raufoss Fotball announced to Oppland Arbeiderblad that they would have to withdraw from the project without funding guarantees from Raufoss municipality.

Nammo Stadion was opened on 13 June 2015. Raufoss won the opening game against Sprint-Jeløy with the score 3–1. In 2016, after Raufoss' promotion to the second tier, Raufoss was given NOK 1,500,000 from Oppland County municipality for facility upgrades, including under-soil heating, floodlights and increased under-roof seating capacity.

== Attendances ==
This shows the average attendance on Raufoss' home games since the 2016 season, the first full season after the opening of Nammo Stadion.

†	1. divisjon
	2. divisjon

Attendance
Season	Avg	Min	Max	Rank	Ref
2016	766	267	1,175	11†	
2017–2018	N/A				
2019	1,156	747	2,157	9†	
