= Poul Kallsberg =

Faroese footballer (born 2003)

Personal information
- Full name: Poul Kallsberg
- Date of birth: 4 February 2003 (age 23)
- Place of birth: Kolbeinagjógv, Faroe Islands
- Height: 1.83 m (6 ft 0 in)
- Position: Forward

Team information
- Current team: Hillerød
- Number: 10

Youth career
- Skála

Senior career*
Years	Team	Apps	(Gls)
2019–2022	Skála	80	(16)
2023–2025	Víkingur Gøta	69	(23)
2025–	Hillerød	23	(4)

International career^{‡}
2017	Faroe Islands U15	2	(0)
2019	Faroe Islands U17	9	(1)
2021	Faroe Islands U19	5	(0)
2022–	Faroe Islands U21	2	(0)
2025–	Faroe Islands	6	(0)
- * Club domestic league appearances and goals as of 2 June 2026 ‡ National team caps and goals as of 15 November 2026

Poul Kallsberg (born 4 February 2003) is a Faroese professional footballer who plays for Danish 1st Division club Hillerød and the Faroe Islands national team.

== Club career ==
Kallsberg played for Skála as a youth. It wasn't until in June 2019, where he made his senior debut for Skála against KÍ in the Betri Deildin. During the 2021 season, he won the 1. deild to gain promotion back to Betri Deildin after his side got relegated last season.

Kallsberg was offered a week trial from Italian club Lazio through a teammate's agent who knew the staff in the club.

On 10 November 2022, Kallsberg joined Víkingur Gøta on a two-year contract after Skála got relegated at the conclusion of the season.

On 10 July 2025, Kallsberg moved abroad and joined Danish 1st Division side Hillerød on a three-year contract.

== International career ==
Kallsberg has represented the Faroe Islands at youth level.

== Personal life ==
Growing up in Faroe Islands, Kallsberg supports English club Arsenal and has dreamt of playing for the Gunners as a kid. He revealed his favourite players was both Cristiano Ronaldo and Neymar.
