= Amar Musić (footballer) =

Bosnian footballer (born 2003)

Personal information
- Date of birth: 20 January 2003 (age 23)
- Place of birth: Como, Italy
- Position: Defender

Team information
- Current team: Radnik Hadžići
- Number: 3

Youth career
- –2021: Željezničar

Senior career*
Years	Team	Apps	(Gls)
2021–2024	Željezničar	1	(0)
2022–2023	→ Gradina (loan)	24	(0)
2024–	Radnik Hadžići	7	(0)

International career^{‡}
2017–2018	Bosnia and Herzegovina U15	4	(1)
2019	Bosnia and Herzegovina U16	3	(0)
2019	Bosnia and Herzegovina U17	9	(1)
2019	Bosnia and Herzegovina U18	2	(0)
2021–22	Bosnia and Herzegovina U19	7	(0)
- * Club domestic league appearances and goals as of 20 April 2024 ‡ National team caps and goals as of 23 March 2022

Amar Musić (born 20 January 2003) is a Bosnian professional footballer who plays as a defender for First League of FBiH club Radnik Hadžići.

== Club career ==
In August 2021, Musić made his debut for his childhood club Željezničar in an away loss against Zrinjski Mostar. After Musić finished season with Željezničar, next season he went on loan in First League of FBiH club Gradina. After Musić returned to Željezničar from loan, he signed new contract with the club. However, in the winter transfer window, he left the club and signed for Radnik Hadžići.

== Personal life ==
Amar's father Vedin was also a professional footaballer.

== Career statistics ==
=== Club ===
As of match played 20 April 2024

Appearances and goals by club, season and competition
Club	Season	League			National cup (Note: Appearance(s) in Bosnia and Herzegovina Football Cup)		Europe		Total	
Club	Season	League	Apps	Goals	Apps	Goals	Apps	Goals	Apps	Goals
Željezničar	2021–22	Bosnian Premier League	1	0	0	0	—		1	0
Željezničar	2023–24	Bosnian Premier League	0	0	0	0	0	0	0	0
Željezničar	Total		1	0	0	0	0	0	1	0
Gradina (loan)	2022–23	First League of FBiH	24	0	1	0	–		25	0
Radnik Hadžići	2023–24	First League of FBiH	7	0	0	0	—		7	0
Career total			32	0	1	0	0	0	33	0
