= Thomas Kotlár =

Slovak footballer

Personal information
- Full name: Thomas Kotlár
- Date of birth: 5 August 2003 (age 23)
- Place of birth: Horná Kráľová, Slovakia
- Height: 1.74 m (5 ft 9 in)
- Position: Forward

Team information
- Current team: OFK Malženice (loan)
- Number: 7

Youth career
- 2010−2014: FK Močenok
- 2015−: Spartak Trnava

Senior career*
| Years | Team | Apps | (Gls) |
| 2020−2022 | Spartak Trnava | 1 | (0) |
| 2022− | Dubnica | 9 | (0) |
| 2023−2026 | OFK Malženice | 30 | (4) |
| 2025 | Slovan Duslo Šaľa (loan) | | |
| 2026– | Slovan Duslo Šaľa | | |

International career^{‡}
| 2017−2018 | Slovakia U15 | 4 | (1) |
| 2019−2020 | Slovakia U17 | 6 | (2) |
| 2021− | Slovakia U18 | 2 | (0) |
| 2021− | Slovakia U19 | 1 | (0) |
- * Club domestic league appearances and goals as of 1 January 2025 ‡ National team caps and goals as of 14:15, 27 July 2021 (UTC)

Thomas Kotlár (born 5 August 2003) is a Slovak footballer who plays for FK Slovan Duslo Šaľa as a forward.

== Club career ==
=== Youth ===
As a youth player, Kotlár played for Močenok, from where he transferred to the academy of Spartak Trnava. As a 14 year old, he went on trial to Dutch club Ajax Amsterdam.

=== Spartak Trnava ===
Kotlár made his professional Fortuna Liga debut for Spartak Trnava against ŠK Slovan Bratislava on 11 July 2020, aged only 16 years, 1 month, and 6 days. Coming on as a substitute in the 89th minute for Bamidele Yusuf, he would not be able to impact the final score of a 0–0 draw.

=== Later career ===
In 2023, Kotlár joined OFK Dynamo Malženice. He scored two goals on his debut for Malženice in a 2–0 league win against OK Častkovce. He scored the winning goal for Dynamo Malženice in a 2–0 win over FC Tatran Prešov. In 2026, he re-joined Slovan Duslo Sala after previously having been on loan at the club.

== Personal life ==
Kotlár has a brother, Radovan, who also is a footballer.
