= Mušič =

Mušič is a Slovene language surname. Notable people with the name include:

- Aleš Mušič (born 1982), Slovenian ice hockey player
- Marko Mušič (born 1941), Slovenian architect
- Zoran Mušič (1909–2005), Slovenian painter

== See also ==
- Mušić
