= Donji Mušić =

Coordinates: 44.2769°N 20.1364°E

- Village (Selo)
- Interactive map of Donji Mušić
- Country: Serbia
- District: Kolubara
- Municipality: Mionica
- Time zone: UTC+1 (CET)
  - Summer (DST): UTC+2 (CEST)

Donji Mušić is a village situated in Mionica municipality in Serbia.
