= 2020 UEFA European Under-17 Championship =

Jalgpalli alla 17-aastaste Euroopa meistrivõistlused 2020

Tournament details
- Host country: Estonia
- Dates: Cancelled (originally 21 May – 6 June)
- Teams: 16 (from 1 confederation)
- Venue: 8 (in 7 host cities)

The 2020 UEFA European Under-17 Championship (also known as UEFA Under-17 Euro 2020) was originally to be held as the 19th UEFA European Under-17 Championship (38th edition if the Under-16 era is also included), the annual international youth football championship organised by UEFA for the men's under-17 national teams of Europe, before being cancelled due to the COVID-19 pandemic. Estonia, which were selected by UEFA on 9 December 2016, were originally to host the tournament. A total of 16 teams were originally to play in the tournament, with players born on or after 1 January 2003 eligible to participate.

The final tournament was originally scheduled to be played between 21 May and 6 June 2020. After initially being postponed due to the COVID-19 pandemic, UEFA announced on 1 April 2020 that the tournament had been cancelled.

The Netherlands were the two-time defending champions.

== Qualification ==
All 55 UEFA nations entered the competition, and with the hosts Estonia qualifying automatically, the other 54 teams competed in the qualifying competition to determine the remaining 15 spots in the final tournament. The qualifying competition consisted of two rounds: Qualifying round, which took place in autumn 2019, and Elite round, which was scheduled for spring 2020, but was cancelled due to the COVID-19 pandemic.

=== Final draw ===
The final draw was originally to be held on 8 April 2020 in Tallinn, Estonia. The 16 teams would be drawn into four groups of four teams. The hosts Estonia would be assigned to position A1 in the draw, while the other teams would be seeded according to their results in the qualification elite round. The seven best elite round group winners (counting all elite round results) would be placed in Pot 1 and drawn to positions 1 and 2 in the groups, and the remaining eight teams (the eighth-best elite round group winner and the seven elite round group runners-up) would be placed in Pot 2 and drawn to positions 3 and 4 in the groups.

== Venues ==
The tournament were originally to be held in eight venues.

- A. Le Coq Arena, Tallinn (3 matches in Groups A/B, quarter-final, semi-final, final)
- Kadriorg Stadium, Tallinn (4 matches in Groups A/B, semi-final)
- Haapsalu Stadium, Haapsalu (2 matches in Groups A/B)
- Rakvere Stadium, Rakvere (3 matches in Groups A/B, quarter-final)
- Tamme Stadium, Tartu (3 matches in Groups C/D, quarter-final)
- Viljandi Stadium, Viljandi (3 matches in Groups C/D)
- Tehvandi Stadium, Otepää (3 matches in Groups C/D, quarter-final)
- Võru Stadium, Võru (3 matches in Groups C/D)

== Group stage ==
The group winners and runners-up would have advanced to the quarter-finals.

Tiebreakers

In the group stage, teams are ranked according to points (3 points for a win, 1 point for a draw, 0 points for a loss), and if tied on points, the following tiebreaking criteria are applied, in the order given, to determine the rankings (Regulations Articles 17.01 and 17.02):

1. Points in head-to-head matches among tied teams;
2. Goal difference in head-to-head matches among tied teams;
3. Goals scored in head-to-head matches among tied teams;
4. If more than two teams are tied, and after applying all head-to-head criteria above, a subset of teams are still tied, all head-to-head criteria above are reapplied exclusively to this subset of teams;
5. Goal difference in all group matches;
6. Goals scored in all group matches;
7. Penalty shoot-out if only two teams have the same number of points, and they met in the last round of the group and are tied after applying all criteria above (not used if more than two teams have the same number of points, or if their rankings are not relevant for qualification for the next stage);
8. Disciplinary points (red card = 3 points, yellow card = 1 point, expulsion for two yellow cards in one match = 3 points);
9. UEFA coefficient ranking for the qualifying round draw;
10. Drawing of lots.

=== Group A ===
Pos	Team	Pld	W	D	L	GF	GA	GD	Pts	Qualification
1	Estonia (H)	0	0	0	0	0	0	0	0	Knockout stage
2	A2	0	0	0	0	0	0	0	0	Knockout stage
3	A3	0	0	0	0	0	0	0	0	
4	A4	0	0	0	0	0	0	0	0	

Source: UEFA
Rules for classification: Tiebreakers
(H) Hosts
21 May 2020

Estonia	Cancelled	A4

21 May 2020

A3	Cancelled	A2

24 May 2020

Estonia	Cancelled	A3

24 May 2020

A2	Cancelled	A4

27 May 2020

A2	Cancelled	Estonia

27 May 2020

A4	Cancelled	A3

=== Group B ===
Pos	Team	Pld	W	D	L	GF	GA	GD	Pts	Qualification
1	B1	0	0	0	0	0	0	0	0	Knockout stage
2	B2	0	0	0	0	0	0	0	0	Knockout stage
3	B3	0	0	0	0	0	0	0	0	
4	B4	0	0	0	0	0	0	0	0	

Source: UEFA
Rules for classification: Tiebreakers
22 May 2020

B1	Cancelled	B4

22 May 2020

B3	Cancelled	B2

25 May 2020

B1	Cancelled	B3

25 May 2020

B2	Cancelled	B4

28 May 2020

B2	Cancelled	B1

28 May 2020

B4	Cancelled	B3

=== Group C ===
Pos	Team	Pld	W	D	L	GF	GA	GD	Pts	Qualification
1	C1	0	0	0	0	0	0	0	0	Knockout stage
2	C2	0	0	0	0	0	0	0	0	Knockout stage
3	C3	0	0	0	0	0	0	0	0	
4	C4	0	0	0	0	0	0	0	0	

Source: UEFA
Rules for classification: Tiebreakers
21 May 2020

C1	Cancelled	C4

21 May 2020

C3	Cancelled	C2

24 May 2020

C1	Cancelled	C3

24 May 2020

C2	Cancelled	C4

27 May 2020

C2	Cancelled	C1

27 May 2020

C4	Cancelled	C3

=== Group D ===
Pos	Team	Pld	W	D	L	GF	GA	GD	Pts	Qualification
1	D1	0	0	0	0	0	0	0	0	Knockout stage
2	D2	0	0	0	0	0	0	0	0	Knockout stage
3	D3	0	0	0	0	0	0	0	0	
4	D4	0	0	0	0	0	0	0	0	

Source: UEFA
Rules for classification: Tiebreakers
22 May 2020

D1	Cancelled	D4

22 May 2020

D3	Cancelled	D2

25 May 2020

D1	Cancelled	D3

25 May 2020

D2	Cancelled	D4

28 May 2020

D2	Cancelled	D1

28 May 2020

D4	Cancelled	D3

== Knockout stage ==
In the knockout stage, penalty shoot-out would be used to decide the winner if necessary (no extra time would be played).

=== Bracket ===
Quarter-finals
31 May –
Winner Group A
Runner-up Group B
31 May –
Winner Group C
Runner-up Group D
31 May –
Winner Group B
Runner-up Group A
31 May –
Winner Group D
Runner-up Group C

Semi-finals
3 June –
Winner Quarter-final 1
Winner Quarter-final 3
3 June –
Winner Quarter-final 2
Winner Quarter-final 4

Final
6 June – Tallinn (A. Le Coq)
Winner Semi-final 1
Winner Semi-final 2

=== Quarter-finals ===
31 May 2020

Winner Group A	Cancelled	Runner-up Group B

31 May 2020

Winner Group B	Cancelled	Runner-up Group A

31 May 2020

Winner Group C	Cancelled	Runner-up Group D

31 May 2020

Winner Group D	Cancelled	Runner-up Group C

=== Semi-finals ===
3 June 2020

Winner Quarter-final 1	Cancelled	Winner Quarter-final 3

3 June 2020

Winner Quarter-final 2	Cancelled	Winner Quarter-final 4

=== Final ===
6 June 2020

Winner Semi-final 1	Cancelled	Winner Semi-final 2

A. Le Coq Arena, Tallinn
