= Gornji Mušić =

Coordinates: 44°17′41″N 20°07′02″E

Gornji Mušić Gornji Mušljić
- Village (Selo)
- Interactive map of Gornji Mušić
- Country: Serbia
- District: Kolubara
- Municipality: Mionica
- Time zone: UTC+1 (CET)
  - Summer (DST): UTC+2 (CEST)

Gornji Mušić is a village situated in Mionica municipality in Serbia.
