= 1994 UEFA European Under-16 Championship squads =

Below are the rosters for the EFA European Under-16 Football Championship 1994 tournament in Republic of Ireland.

== Group A ==
=== Albania ===
Head coach: Mexhit Haxhiu
Ass. coach: Agim Medja

No.	Pos.	Player	Date of birth (age)	Caps	Goals	Club
	GK	Orges Shehi	20 September 1977 (aged 16)			(Albanian Football Federation) KF Teuta
	GK	Hektor Prence				(Albanian Football Federation) KF Lushnja
	GK	Rigels Kapllani				(Albanian Football Federation) KF Tirana
	DF	Ilir Dibra	16 August 1977 (aged 16)			(Albanian Football Federation) KF Vllaznia
	DF	Sparti Domi				(Albanian Football Federation) Shkëndija Tiranë
	DF	Florian Ibrahimi				(Albanian Football Federation) Shkëndija Tiranë
	DF	Luan Pinari	27 October 1977 (aged 16)			(Albanian Football Federation) FK Dinamo
	DF	Eno Tarja				(Albanian Football Federation) FK Dinamo
	DF	Roland Zeqiraj				(Albanian Football Federation) KS Besëlidhja
	DF	Elton Fani				(Albanian Football Federation) FK Tomori
	DF	Xhemal Kondraxhiu				(Albanian Football Federation) FK Tomori
	DF	Erald Popa				(Albanian Football Federation) FK Partizani
	MF	Vioresin Sinani	4 December 1977 (aged 16)			(Albanian Football Federation) KF Vllaznia
	MF	Oltion Metohu				(Albanian Football Federation) KF Tirana
	MF	Gentian Bylykbashi				(Albanian Football Federation) Shkëndija Tiranë
	MF	Ervis Tozaj				(Albanian Football Federation) KS Flamurtari
	MF	Altin Malqi				(Albanian Football Federation) KF Skënderbeu
	MF	Genti Ristollari				(Albanian Football Federation) KS Pogradec
	MF	Altin Simaku				(Albanian Football Federation) KS Besa
	FW	Eldorado Merkoçi	6 January 1978 (aged 16)			(Albanian Football Federation) KF Tirana
	FW	Gentian Medja				(Albanian Football Federation) KF Vllaznia
	FW	Vaske Ruko				(Albanian Football Federation) KF Apolonia
	FW	Rigels Qose	3 August 1977 (aged 16)			(Albanian Football Federation) KF Skënderbeu
	FW	Elton Koka				(Albanian Football Federation) FK Partizani
	FW	Dameo Hoxha				(Albanian Football Federation) KS Naftëtari

=== Austria ===
Head coach:

=== Belarus ===
Head coach: Yuri Pyshnik

No.	Pos.	Player	Date of birth (age)	Caps	Goals	Club
	GK	Uladzimir Haew	28 October 1977 (aged 16)			(Football Federation of Belarus) Dinamo Minsk
	GK	Sergey Bekish	17 July 1978 (aged 15)			(Football Federation of Belarus) RUOR Minsk
	DF	Andrey Lukashevich	25 August 1977 (aged 16)			(Football Federation of Belarus) RUOR Minsk
	DF	Mikhail Vavilov	10 November 1977 (aged 16)			(Football Federation of Belarus) RUOR Minsk
	DF	Vadim Kirilenko	18 August 1977 (aged 16)			(Football Federation of Belarus) RUOR Minsk
	DF	Aleksandr Baranov	7 February 1978 (aged 16)			(Football Federation of Belarus) UOR Mogilev
	DF	Igor Balin	29 January 1978 (aged 16)			(Football Federation of Belarus) RUOR Minsk
	DF	Vadim Narushevich	7 January 1978 (aged 16)			(Football Federation of Belarus) RUOR Minsk
	MF	Dmitry Kapelyan	9 August 1977 (aged 16)			(Football Federation of Belarus) RUOR Minsk
	MF	Dzmitry Likhtarovich	3 January 1978 (aged 16)			(Football Federation of Belarus) UOR Mogilev
	MF	Ivan Tabola	1 January 1978 (aged 16)			(Football Federation of Belarus) RUOR Minsk
	MF	Aleksey Novitskiy	5 September 1977 (aged 16)			(Football Federation of Belarus) RUOR Minsk
	MF	Vladimir Ignatik	31 December 1977 (aged 16)			(Football Federation of Belarus) Ataka-Aura Minsk
	FW	Mikalay Ryndzyuk	2 February 1978 (aged 16)			(Football Federation of Belarus) Smena Minsk
	FW	Igor Osipenko	28 August 1977 (aged 16)			(Football Federation of Belarus) RUOR Minsk
	FW	Dmitry Gavrilovich	16 October 1977 (aged 16)			(Football Federation of Belarus) RUOR Minsk

=== Spain ===
Head coach: Juan Santisteban

No.	Pos.	Player	Date of birth (age)	Caps	Goals	Club
	GK	Salvador Balbuena	3 February 1978 (aged 16)	3	0	(Royal Spanish Football Federation) Valencia CF
	GK	Sergio Morán	2 September 1977 (aged 16)	3	0	(Royal Spanish Football Federation) CF Montañesa
	DF	Moisés	30 January 1978 (aged 16)	10	1	(Royal Spanish Football Federation) CD Tenerife
	DF	Manuel Cabezas	6 February 1978 (aged 16)	6	2	(Royal Spanish Football Federation) Valencia CF
	DF	Óscar Jornet	18 May 1978 (aged 15)	11	0	(Royal Spanish Football Federation) FC Barcelona
	DF	Jero	19 September 1977 (aged 16)	15	0	(Royal Spanish Football Federation) Valencia CF
	DF	Juli	28 August 1977 (aged 16)	10	0	(Royal Spanish Football Federation) Albacete Balompié
	MF	Javier Farinós	29 March 1978 (aged 16)	10	1	(Royal Spanish Football Federation) Valencia CF
	MF	Álex Fernández	24 November 1977 (aged 16)	6	1	(Royal Spanish Football Federation) Real Betis
	MF	Aarón Gamboa	19 December 1977 (aged 16)	4	3	(Royal Spanish Football Federation) Athletic Bilbao
	MF	Rubén García	17 November 1977 (aged 16)	11	0	(Royal Spanish Football Federation) Damm
	MF	Rubén Rey	4 August 1977 (aged 16)	11	3	(Royal Spanish Football Federation) Real Madrid
	MF	Alberto Rivera	16 February 1978 (aged 16)	12	3	(Royal Spanish Football Federation) Real Madrid
	FW	David Cabello	9 September 1977 (aged 16)	11	4	(Royal Spanish Football Federation) FC Barcelona
	FW	Joseba Etxeberria	5 September 1977 (aged 16)	14	9	(Royal Spanish Football Federation) Real Sociedad
	FW	Miguel Rubio	12 August 1977 (aged 16)	3	1	(Royal Spanish Football Federation) Real Madrid

== Group B ==
=== Czechoslovakia ===
Head coach:Rudolf Novak

No.	Pos.	Player	Date of birth (age)	Caps	Goals	Club
1	GK	Ján Mucha	20 June 1978 (aged 15)			
2		Roman Graca				
3	MF	Ivan Adam	20 February 1978 (aged 16)			
4		Radoslav Toth				
5		Martin Minarovic				
6	MF	Juraj Czinege	29 October 1977 (aged 16)			
7		Frantisek Kamancza				
8		Martin Hasprun				
9		Miroslav Bagocky				
10	FW	Szilard Nemeth	8 August 1977 (aged 16)			
11		Miroslav Laclavik				
12	DF	Martin Laurinc	4 January 1978 (aged 16)			
13		Juraj Chribik				
14	MF	Lubos Lojdl	19 August 1977 (aged 16)			
15		Peter Cukan				
22	MF	Ratislav Belicak	9 January 1977 (aged 17)			

=== England ===
Head coach:

No.	Pos.	Player	Date of birth (age)	Caps	Goals	Club
1	GK	Richard Wright	5 November 1977 (aged 16)			(The Football Association) Ipswich Town
2	DF	Michael Millett	22 September 1977 (aged 16)			(The Football Association) Wigan Athletic
3	DF	David Hilton	10 November 1977 (aged 16)			(The Football Association) Manchester United
4	DF	Marlon Broomes	28 November 1977 (aged 16)			(The Football Association) Blackburn Rovers
5	DF	Ronnie Wallwork	10 September 1977 (aged 16)			(The Football Association) Manchester United
6	MF	Leam Richardson	19 November 1979 (aged 14)			(The Football Association) Blackburn Rovers
7	MF	Stephen Clemence	31 March 1978 (aged 16)			(The Football Association) Tottenham Hotspur
8	MF	Jamie Carragher	28 January 1978 (aged 16)			(The Football Association) Liverpool
9	FW	Andy Ducros	16 September 1977 (aged 16)			(The Football Association) Coventry City
10	FW	Jamie Cassidy	21 November 1977 (aged 16)			(The Football Association) Liverpool
11	MF	Jamie Shore	1 September 1977 (aged 16)			(The Football Association) Norwich City
12	FW	Emile Heskey	11 January 1978 (aged 16)			(The Football Association) Leicester City
13	MF	Nigel Quashie	20 July 1978 (aged 15)			(The Football Association) Queens Park Rangers
14		S Heath	1 January 1978 (aged 16)			NA
15	DF	Lee Crooks	14 January 1978 (aged 16)			(The Football Association) Manchester City

=== Republic of Ireland ===
Head coach:Turlough O'Connor

No.	Pos.	Player	Date of birth (age)	Caps	Goals	Club
1	GK	Derek O'Connor	9 March 1978 (aged 16)			
2	DF	David Worrell	12 January 1978 (aged 16)			
3	MF	Stephen Murphy	5 April 1978 (aged 16)			
4	DF	Colin Hawkins	17 August 1977 (aged 16)			
5	DF	Ross Darcy	21 March 1978 (aged 16)			
6		Graham O'Hanlon				
7	MF	Michael Cummins	1 July 1978 (aged 15)			
8	MF	John Burns	4 December 1977 (aged 16)			
9		Alan Mannix				
10		Alan Joseph Mahon	4 April 1978 (aged 16)			
11		Brian Frawley				
12	FW	Alan Kirby	8 September 1978 (aged 15)			
13	FW	Desmond Baker	25 August 1977 (aged 16)			
14	DF	Simon Webb	19 January 1978 (aged 16)			
15	DF	Graham Cassin	24 March 1978 (aged 16)			
16	GK	Alan Hughes				

=== Portugal ===
Head coach:Rui Cacador

No.	Pos.	Player	Date of birth (age)	Caps	Goals	Club
1	GK	Nuno Santos	9 July 1978 (aged 15)			
2	MF	Martinho	11 January 1977 (aged 17)			
3	MF	Adolfo Soares	13 December 1977 (aged 16)			
4	FW	Edgar	7 August 1977 (aged 16)			
5	MF	Paulo Pereira	13 January 1977 (aged 17)			
6	DF	Fernando Meira	5 July 1978 (aged 15)			
7	MF	Pedro Monteiro	31 August 1977 (aged 16)			
8	DF	Bruno Basto	12 May 1978 (aged 15)			
9	FW	Zeferino	27 August 1977 (aged 16)			
10	MF	Rui Lima	25 March 1978 (aged 16)			
11	DF	Marco Caneira	9 February 1979 (aged 15)			
12	GK	Adriano	23 November 1977 (aged 16)			
13	DF	Bruno Patacas	30 November 1977 (aged 16)			
14	FW	Vargas	18 November 1978 (aged 15)			
15	DF	Bruno	9 December 1977 (aged 16)			
16	DF	Carlos Fernandes	5 May 1978 (aged 15)			

== Group C ==
=== Denmark ===
Head coach:Poul Erik Bech

No.	Pos.	Player	Date of birth (age)	Caps	Goals	Club
	GK	Jacob M. Johansen	9 August 1977 (aged 16)			
	MF	Morten Lauritsen	10 December 1977 (aged 16)			
		Carsten Lektonen	22 August 1978 (aged 15)			
	DF	Kim Heiselberg	21 August 1977 (aged 16)			(Danish Football Association) Esjberg
		Brian Iversen	28 August 1977 (aged 16)			
	MF	Mads Olsen	6 January 1978 (aged 16)			
	MF	Michael Poulsen	27 August 1977 (aged 16)			
	DF	Stefan K. Hansen	26 October 1978 (aged 15)			
	FW	Jesper Grønkjær	12 August 1977 (aged 16)			
	MF	Kenny Thorup	7 December 1977 (aged 16)			
	DF	Lasse Vigh	26 July 1977 (aged 16)			
	MF	Claus Nielsen	12 January 1978 (aged 16)			
	DF	Martin Jensen	15 April 1978 (aged 16)			(Danish Football Association) Esjberg
		Tony Lund-Burmeister	5 November 1977 (aged 16)			

=== Germany ===
Head coach: Bernd Stöber

No.	Pos.	Player	Date of birth (age)	Caps	Goals	Club
	GK	Dino Breuer	24 November 1977 (aged 16)	0	0	(German Football Association) Bayer 04 Leverkusen
	GK	Robert Enke	24 August 1977 (aged 16)	3	0	(German Football Association) FC Carl Zeiss Jena
	DF	Sascha Bauer	12 May 1977 (aged 16)	3	0	(German Football Association) 1. FC Köln
	DF	Jörg Disteldorf	22 October 1977 (aged 16)	3	0	(German Football Association) Bayer 04 Leverkusen
	DF	Sascha Koch	15 August 1977 (aged 16)	2	0	(German Football Association) 1. FC Kaiserslautern
	DF	Jörg Scherbe	15 October 1977 (aged 16)	3	0	(German Football Association) FC Energie Cottbus
	DF	Frank Wiblishauser	18 October 1977 (aged 16)	3	0	(German Football Association) FC Memmingen
	MF	Renato Levy	25 August 1977 (aged 16)	3	1	(German Football Association) Kickers Offenbach
	MF	Thorsten Nehrbauer	12 January 1978 (aged 16)	3	1	(German Football Association) Bayer 04 Leverkusen
	MF	Ersan Parlatan	8 January 1977 (aged 17)	2	1	(German Football Association) Hertha BSC
	MF	Olaf Saur	6 November 1977 (aged 16)	3	2	(German Football Association) VfB Stuttgart
	MF	Marco Weller	4 August 1977 (aged 16)	1	0	(German Football Association) 1. FC Köln
	FW	Christian Fröhlich	27 October 1977 (aged 16)	3	1	(German Football Association) Dynamo Dresden
	FW	Daniel Kallus	10 August 1977 (aged 16)	3	0	(German Football Association) Bayer 04 Leverkusen
	FW	Marco Reich	30 December 1977 (aged 16)	3	2	(German Football Association) 1. FC Kaiserslautern
	FW	Marco Villa	18 July 1978 (aged 15)	1	0	(German Football Association) Bayer 05 Uerdingen

=== Russia ===
Head coach:

=== Switzerland ===
Head coach:

== Group D ==
=== Belgium ===
Head coach:

=== Iceland ===
Head coach:

=== Turkey ===
Head coach: Bora Ozturk

No.	Pos.	Player	Date of birth (age)	Caps	Goals	Club
1	GK	Fevzi Tuncay	14 September 1977 (aged 16)			
2		Canel Çalişkan	10 August 1977 (aged 16)			
3		Osman Tan	28 October 1977 (aged 16)			
4		Cüneyt Seletli	5 September 1979 (aged 14)			
5	DF	Okan Özke	5 August 1977 (aged 16)			
6	MF	Ruşen Duranoğlu	1 October 1977 (aged 16)			
7	MF	Ahmet Habiboğlu	10 August 1977 (aged 16)			
8	FW	Fatih Tekke	9 September 1977 (aged 16)			
9		Egemen Bayhan	1 January 1977 (aged 17)			
10		Ekrem Yaman	15 October 1977 (aged 16)			
11	FW	Serdar Meriç	10 October 1977 (aged 16)			
12	GK	Özgür Güngör	22 October 1977 (aged 16)			
13	MF	Mehmet Önür	3 April 1978 (aged 16)			
14		Akin Sağlam	16 December 1977 (aged 16)			
15		Burak Gok				
16		Sedat Aydin	3 May 1978 (aged 15)			

=== Ukraine ===
Head coach: Volodymyr Kyianchenko

No.	Pos.	Player	Date of birth (age)	Caps	Goals	Club
1	GK	Oleh Ostapenko	27 October 1977 (aged 16)	5	0	(Ukrainian Association of Football) Dnipropetrovsk UOR
2	DF	Oleh Fedoruk	27 October 1977 (aged 16)	6	2	(Ukrainian Association of Football) Republican VUFK
3	DF	Denys Kolchin	13 October 1977 (aged 16)	6	0	(Ukrainian Association of Football) Chornomorets Odesa
4	DF	Omar Mishkov	10 November 1977 (aged 16)	6	0	(Ukrainian Association of Football) Lazurne More Odesa
5	DF	Dmytro Nazarov	3 August 1977 (aged 16)	6	0	(Ukrainian Association of Football) Simferopol UOR
6	DF	Oleksiy Kuptsov	2 September 1977 (aged 16)	2	0	(Ukrainian Association of Football) Dnipropetrovsk UOR
7	MF	Serhiy Zghura	3 November 1977 (aged 16)	6	1	(Ukrainian Association of Football) Chornomorets Odesa
8	MF	Hennadiy Zubov	12 September 1977 (aged 16)	6	1	(Ukrainian Association of Football) Stal Alchevsk
9	FW	Oleh Yashchuk	26 October 1977 (aged 16)	4	3	(Ukrainian Association of Football) Nyva Ternopil
10	MF	Volodymyr Hopkalo	7 December 1978 (aged 15)	5	1	(Ukrainian Association of Football) Dynamo Kyiv
11	MF	Serhiy Bilokin	14 November 1977 (aged 16)	4	1	(Ukrainian Association of Football) Dnipropetrovsk UOR
12	GK	Serhiy Perkhun	4 September 1977 (aged 16)	1	0	(Ukrainian Association of Football) Dnipro Dnipropetrovsk
13	MF	Andriy Klymenko	13 September 1977 (aged 16)	3	0	(Ukrainian Association of Football) Lviv UOR
14	FW	Valentyn Slyusar	15 September 1977 (aged 16)	6	1	(Ukrainian Association of Football) Dynamo Kyiv
15	MF	Serhiy Omelyanovych	13 August 1977 (aged 16)	5	1	(Ukrainian Association of Football) Zorya-MALS Luhansk
16	FW	Andriy Holovko	5 August 1977 (aged 16)	3	0	(Ukrainian Association of Football) Dnipro-75 Dnipropetrovsk
