= Ukraine national under-17 football team =

Sports team

Ukraine Under-17
- Association: Football Federation of Ukraine
- Confederation: UEFA (Europe)
- Head coach: Oleksandr Sytnyk
- Captain: Pavlo Lyusin
- FIFA code: UKR
First colours	Second colours

World Cup
- Appearances: 0

European Under-17 Championship
- Appearances: 11 (first in 1994)
- Best result: 3rd place, 1994

The Ukraine national under-17 football team represents Ukraine in international football at this age level and is controlled by the Football Federation of Ukraine, the governing body for football in Ukraine.

== FIFA U-16 and U-17 World Cup record ==
FIFA U-16 and U-17 World Cup
Year	Round	Position	GP	W	D	L	GS	GA
(China) 1985	As part Soviet Union							
(Canada) 1987	As part Soviet Union							
(Scotland) 1989	As part Soviet Union							
(Italy) 1991	As part Soviet Union							
(Japan) 1993	Did not qualify							
(Ecuador) 1995	Did not qualify							
(Egypt) 1997	Did not qualify							
(New Zealand) 1999	Did not qualify							
(Trinidad and Tobago) 2001	Did not qualify							
(Finland) 2003	Did not qualify							
(Peru) 2005	Did not qualify							
(South Korea) 2007	Did not qualify							
(Nigeria) 2009	Did not qualify							
(Mexico) 2011	Did not qualify							
(United Arab Emirates) 2013	Did not qualify							
(Chile) 2015	Did not qualify							
(India) 2017	Did not qualify							
(Brazil) 2019	Did not qualify							
(Peru) ~~2021~~	Cancelled							
(Indonesia) 2023	Did not qualify							
(Qatar) 2025	Did not qualify							
(Qatar) 2026	Did not qualify							
(Qatar) 2027	To be determined							
(Qatar) 2028	To be determined							
(Qatar) 2029	To be determined							
Total:0/21	TBD		0	0	0	0	0	0

== UEFA European Under-16/Under-17 Football Championship record ==
=== Under-16 format ===
UEFA European Under-17 Championship record									Elite Round					
Year	Round	GP	W	D*	L	GF	GA	Squad	GP	W	D	L	GF	GA
(Republic of Ireland) 1994	3rd place	6	3	3	0	11	7	Squad	2	2	0	0	10	0
(Belgium) 1995	Did not qualify								2	0	0	2	2	7
(Austria) 1996	Group stage	3	1	1	1	3	7	Squad	2	2	0	0	5	0
(Germany) 1997	Group stage	3	1	0	2	5	9	Squad	2	2	0	0	8	0
(Scotland) 1998	Group stage	3	1	1	1	3	4	Squad	4	3	1	0	7	0
(Czech Republic) 1999	Did not qualify								4	1	1	2	4	6
(Israel) 2000	Did not qualify								2	1	0	1	2	3
(England) 2001	Did not qualify								2	1	0	1	6	2
Total:4/8	3rd place	15	6	5	4	22	27		20	12	2	6	44	18

=== Under-17 format ===
UEFA European Under-17 Championship record									Elite Round					
Year	Round	GP	W	D*	L	GF	GA	Squad	GP	W	D	L	GF	GA
(Denmark) 2002	Group stage	3	0	1	2	2	5	Squad	2	2	0	0	6	3
(Portugal) 2003	Did not qualify								eliminated in the First Round					
(France) 2004	Group stage	3	0	0	3	1	8	Squad	3	2	0	1	6	3
(Italy) 2005	Did not qualify								3	1	2	0	4	1
(Luxembourg) 2006	Did not qualify								3	0	2	1	3	7
(Belgium) 2007	Group stage	3	0	1	2	3	7	Squad	3	3	0	0	8	2
(Turkey) 2008	Did not qualify								eliminated in the First Round					
(Germany) 2009	Did not qualify								eliminated in the First Round					
(Liechtenstein) 2010	Did not qualify								3	0	1	2	3	6
(Serbia) 2011	Did not qualify								3	0	1	2	2	5
(Slovenia) 2012	Did not qualify								3	0	1	2	2	4
(Slovakia) 2013	Group stage	3	0	0	3	2	7	Squad	3	2	1	0	6	1
(Malta) 2014	Did not qualify								3	2	0	1	7	4
(Bulgaria) 2015	Did not qualify								3	0	0	3	1	6
(Azerbaijan) 2016	Group stage	3	0	1	2	3	6	Squad	3	2	1	0	7	1
(Croatia) 2017	Group stage	3	1	0	2	2	5	Squad	3	2	0	1	5	5
(England) 2018	Did not qualify								3	0	2	1	1	4
(Republic of Ireland) 2019	Did not qualify								3	1	0	2	2	2
(Estonia) 2020	Cancelled due to COVID-19 pandemic								Cancelled due to COVID-19 pandemic					
(Cyprus) 2021	Cancelled due to COVID-19 pandemic								Cancelled due to COVID-19 pandemic					
(Israel) 2022	Did not qualify								3	1	0	2	5	6
(Hungary) 2023	Did not qualify								3	1	0	2	4	8
(Cyprus) 2024	Group stage	3	1	0	2	3	4	Squad	3	3	0	0	8	0
(Albania) 2025	Did not qualify								6	3	0	3	11	8
(Estonia) 2026	Did not qualify								5	2	1	2	10	7
(Latvia) 2027	Did not qualify								3	1	0	2	3	6
Total:7/21	Group stage	21	2	3	16	16	42	-	66	28	12	26	104	85

*Denotes draws include knockout matches decided on penalty kicks.

== Head coaches ==
- 2010–2011 Yuriy Moroz
- 2011–2012 Oleksandr Petrakov
- 2013–2014 Oleh Kuznetsov
- 2015–2016 Oleksandr Petrakov
- 2016–2017 Serhiy Popov
- 2017–2018 Oleh Kuznetsov
- 2018–2019 Volodymyr Yezerskiy
- 2019–2020 Oleksandr Petrakov
- 2021–2022 Oleh Kuznetsov
- 2022–2023 Yuriy Moroz
- 2023 Volodymyr Yezerskiy
- 2024 Yuriy Moroz
- 2025– Oleksandr Sytnyk

== Tournaments ==
- FIFA U-17 World Cup
- UEFA European Under-17 Championship

== Achievements ==
=== UEFA European Under-17 Championship ===
- U-16 European Championship in 1994 – 3rd place

== Results and fixtures ==
=== 2026 ===
11 February 2026 Friendly	Ukraine	3–1	Greece

16 February 2026 Friendly	Croatia	0–0	Ukraine

21 April 2026 Friendly	Spain	4–0	Ukraine

24 April 2026 Friendly	Spain	3–1	Ukraine

6 June 2026 2026 UEFA Euro U17 qualification Round 2	Ukraine	2–3	Latvia	Egnatia Arena, Rrogozhinë, Albania
18:00	Menniks 53'; Baltrušaitis 65' (pen.); Ščerbinskis 90+6'	Report	Guram 11'; Dzyurynets 48'	Referee: Mathias Støfringshaug (Norway)

9 June 2026 2026 UEFA Euro U17 qualification Round 2	Albania	0–4	Ukraine	Egnatia Arena, Rrogozhinë, Albania
17:00		Report	Dzyurynets 42'; Voloshko 57'; Pylypchuk 63'; Cappellato 83'	Referee: Karel Rouček (Czech Republic)

26 September 2026 U-17 Istria Youth Cup	South Korea	0–5	Ukraine	Arena Sport Centar, Croatia
			Getmanov 13' 33'; Rybak 37'; Bodak 55'; Robustella 73'

29 September 2026 U-17 Istria Youth Cup	Ukraine	0–2	Turkey	Arena Sport Centar, Croatia
				Referee: Mario Prpić (Croatia)

3 October 2026 U-17 Istria Youth Cup	Ukraine	2–3	Italy	Arena Sport Centar, Croatia
				Referee: Mario Prpić (Croatia)

6 October 2026 U-17 Istria Youth Cup	Ukraine	1-0	Norway	Arena Sport Centar, Croatia
	Rybak 90+1'	Report

11 November 2026 2027 UEFA European Under-17 Championship qualification	Ukraine	3-2	Poland	St George's Park National Football Centre, Burton upon Trent, England
	Dzyurynets 38' 71'; Rybak 75'	Report	Leśniak 51'; Bakhno 59'

14 November 2026 2027 UEFA European Under-17 Championship qualification	Montenegro	1–0	Ukraine	St George's Park National Football Centre, Burton upon Trent, England
21:00	Ivanović 70'	Report		Referee: Karl Koppel (Estonia)

17 November 2026 2027 UEFA European Under-17 Championship qualification	England	3–0	Ukraine	St George's Park National Football Centre, Burton upon Trent, England
21:30	Johnson 2'; Fejokwu 73'; Bernard 89'	Report		Attendance: 112; Referee: Karel Rouček (Czech Republic)

== Current squad ==
The following players were called up for the most recent 2026 UEFA European Under-17 Championship qualification matches.

No.	Pos.	Player	Date of birth (age)	Club
1	GK	Oleksandr Stepanov	8 March 2009 (age 17)	(Ukrainian Association of Football) Shakhtar Donetsk
12	GK	Denys Stolyarenko	12 January 2009 (age 17)	(Polish Football Association) Legia Warsaw
13	DF	Bogdan Levytskyi	5 January 2009 (age 17)	(Ukrainian Association of Football) Rukh Lviv
4	DF	Zakhar Onyshchuk	5 April 2009 (age 17)	(Italian Football Federation) Bologna
15	DF	Dmytro Solomchenko	17 February 2009 (age 17)	(Ukrainian Association of Football) Dynamo Kyiv
22	DF	Danylo Prykhodko	24 November 2009 (age 16)	(Ukrainian Association of Football) Polissya Zhytomyr
5	DF	Nazar Smotrytskyi	9 May 2009 (age 17)	(Ukrainian Association of Football) LNZ Cherkasy
2	DF	Yaroslav Bytsyk	16 January 2009 (age 17)	(Ukrainian Association of Football) Shakhtar Donetsk
6	DF	Timofiy Parinov	13 July 2009 (age 17)	(Ukrainian Association of Football) Dynamo Kyiv
21	DF	Oleg Pylypyuk	6 January 2009 (age 17)	(Ukrainian Association of Football) Shakhtar Donetsk
16	MF	Stanislav Shukalovych (captain)	1 August 2009 (age 17)	(Ukrainian Association of Football) Shakhtar Donetsk
18	MF	Danylo Udovychenko	9 June 2009 (age 17)	(Ukrainian Association of Football) LNZ Cherkasy
8	MF	Yevgeniy Voloshko	20 March 2009 (age 17)	(Ukrainian Association of Football) Shakhtar Donetsk
10	MF	Ivan Zadoenko	28 January 2009 (age 17)	(Ukrainian Association of Football) Kryvbas Kryvyi Rih
7	MF	Yaroslav Kozhushko	6 February 2009 (age 17)	(Football Association of the Czech Republic) Slavia Prague
11	MF	Andriy Gamzyk	20 May 2009 (age 17)	(German Football Association) Leverkusen
19	MF	Yevgeniy Gorbatov	20 February 2009 (age 17)	(Ukrainian Association of Football) Oleksandriya
3	FW	Arseniy Safonov	30 April 2009 (age 17)	(Ukrainian Association of Football) Shakhtar Donetsk
14	FW	Ivan Tretyakov	7 July 2009 (age 17)	(Royal Spanish Football Federation) Real Betis
17	FW	Danylo Yashchenko	7 August 2009 (age 17)	(Ukrainian Association of Football) LNZ Cherkasy
9	FW	Danyil Pylypchuk	31 August 2009 (age 17)	(Polish Football Association) Legia Warsaw
20	FW	Yaroslav Buravtsov	21 January 2009 (age 17)	(Ukrainian Association of Football) Dynamo Kyiv

== See also ==
- Ukraine (Senior) team
- Ukraine Under-21 team
- Ukraine Under-19 team
- FIFA U-17 World Cup
- UEFA European Under-17 Championship
