= Zephyrinus =

Zephyrinus is a Latin masculine name (derived from the Greek Ζεφυρος, the name of the west wind). The name has related forms in modern languages:

- Zéphyrin or Zéphirin (French); feminine: Zéphyrine
- Zephyrin or Zephirin (German); feminine Zephryine
- Zeferino (Italian); feminine: Zeferina
- Ceferino, Zeferino or Seferino (Spanish); feminine: Ceferina, Zeferina or Seferina

The name can refer to the following:

== People ==
=== Men ===
- Pope Zephyrinus (died 217), pope and saint
- Zepherinus Joseph (born 1975), Saint Lucia athlete
- Zéphyrin or Zepherin Ferrez (1797–1851), French-Brazilian sculptor and engraver
- Zéphirin Diabré (born 1959), Burkina Faso politician
- Zéphirin Gerbe (1810–1890), French naturalist
- Zéphirin Zoko, Ivorian footballer
- Zephyrin Engelhardt (1851–1934), German Franciscan and historian
- Zéphyrin Camélinat (1840–1932), French communist and political activist
- Zéphyrin Diambu Mutu-di-Lusala Nieva, Congolese politician
- Zéphyrin Toé (1928–2013), Burkina Faso bishop
- François-Zéphirin Tassé, Canadian politician
- Louis-Zéphirin Joncas (1846–1903), Canadian journalist and politician
- Louis-Zéphirin Moreau (1824–1901), German bishop
- Bertrand Zepherin Teyou, Cameroonian author
- Philippe François Zéphirin Guillemin, French bishop
- Raymond Zéphirin Mboulou, Congolese politician

=== Women ===
- Marie Zéphyrine of France (1750–1755), French princess
- Princess Amalie Zephyrine of Salm-Kyrburg (1760–1841), German princess

== See also ==
- Ceferino, a given name
- Rosa 'Zephirine Drouhin', a rose
- Zeferino, a given name
- Zephyrina Jupon, a type of skirt
- Zephirin, a synonym for Clinton (grape)
