= Ukraine national under-16 football team =

National association football team

Ukraine under-16
- Nickname: Zbirna
- Association: Федерація Футболу України
- Head coach: Yuriy Moroz
- Captain: Yehor Kostyuk
First colours	Second colours

The Ukraine national under-16 football team is controlled by the Football Federation of Ukraine.

== History ==
The team participated in tournaments like the Aegean Cup since its formation after the dissolution of the Soviet Union.

== Managers ==
- 1992–2001 Volodymyr Kyianchenko
- Yuriy Kalitvintsev

== Successful squad ==
Head coach: Volodymyr Kyianchenko

No.	Pos.	Player	Date of birth (age)	Caps	Goals	Club
1	GK	Oleh Ostapenko	27 October 1977 (aged 16)	5	0	(Ukrainian Association of Football) Dnipropetrovsk UOR
2	DF	Oleh Fedoruk	27 October 1977 (aged 16)	6	2	(Ukrainian Association of Football) Republican VUFK
3	DF	Denys Kolchin	13 October 1977 (aged 16)	6	0	(Ukrainian Association of Football) Chornomorets Odesa
4	DF	Omar Mishkov	10 November 1977 (aged 16)	6	0	(Ukrainian Association of Football) Lazurne More Odesa
5	DF	Dmytro Nazarov	3 August 1977 (aged 16)	6	0	(Ukrainian Association of Football) Simferopol UOR
6	DF	Oleksiy Kuptsov	2 September 1977 (aged 16)	2	0	(Ukrainian Association of Football) Dnipropetrovsk UOR
7	MF	Serhiy Zghura	3 November 1977 (aged 16)	6	1	(Ukrainian Association of Football) Chornomorets Odesa
8	MF	Hennadiy Zubov	12 September 1977 (aged 16)	6	1	(Ukrainian Association of Football) Stal Alchevsk
9	FW	Oleh Yashchuk	26 October 1977 (aged 16)	4	3	(Ukrainian Association of Football) Nyva Ternopil
10	MF	Volodymyr Hopkalo	7 December 1978 (aged 15)	5	1	(Ukrainian Association of Football) Dynamo Kyiv
11	MF	Serhiy Bilokin	14 November 1977 (aged 16)	4	1	(Ukrainian Association of Football) Dnipropetrovsk UOR
12	GK	Serhiy Perkhun	4 September 1977 (aged 16)	1	0	(Ukrainian Association of Football) Dnipro Dnipropetrovsk
13	MF	Andriy Klymenko	13 September 1977 (aged 16)	3	0	(Ukrainian Association of Football) Lviv UOR
14	FW	Valentyn Slyusar	15 September 1977 (aged 16)	6	1	(Ukrainian Association of Football) Dynamo Kyiv
15	MF	Serhiy Omelyanovych	13 August 1977 (aged 16)	5	1	(Ukrainian Association of Football) Zorya-MALS Luhansk
16	FW	Andriy Holovko	5 August 1977 (aged 16)	3	0	(Ukrainian Association of Football) Dnipro-75 Dnipropetrovsk

== Current squad ==
- The following players were called up for the 2024 Murcia Cup 2024 in Murcia on 26–30 September 2024.
- Match dates: 26, 28 and 30 September 2024
- Opposition: England, France and Israel
- Caps and goals correct as of: 30 September 2024, after the match against Israel

No.	Pos.	Player	Date of birth (age)	Caps	Goals	Club
1	GK	Dmytro Pozhar	31 January 2009 (age 17)	2	0	(Ukrainian Association of Football) Dynamo Kyiv
12	GK	Yan Zhuravskyi	28 July 2009 (age 17)	2	0	Unattached
15	DF	Denys Plaminskyi	3 March 2009 (age 17)	3	0	(Croatian Football Federation) Hajduk Split
22	DF	Semen Koman	30 April 2009 (age 17)	3	0	(Ukrainian Association of Football) Shakhtar Donetsk
16	DF	Maksym Koval	13 May 2009 (age 17)	3	0	(Ukrainian Association of Football) Shakhtar Donetsk
4	DF	Yehor Onishchuk	4 June 2009 (age 17)	3	0	(Ukrainian Association of Football) Shakhtar Donetsk
3	DF	Mykhailo Harbar	26 June 2009 (age 17)	3	0	(Ukrainian Association of Football) Shakhtar Donetsk
14	DF	Bohdan Levytskyi	5 January 2009 (age 17)	2	0	(Ukrainian Association of Football) Rukh Lviv
2	DF	Ivan Chuprin	24 March 2009 (age 17)	2	0	(German Football Association) Fortuna Düsseldorf
5	DF	Roman Shupyk	9 December 2009 (age 16)	2	0	(Ukrainian Association of Football) LNZ Cherkasy
13	MF	Yaroslav Kozhushko	6 February 2009 (age 17)	3	1	(Football Association of the Czech Republic) Slavia Prague
9	MF	Nazar Hurin	18 March 2009 (age 17)	3	0	(Ukrainian Association of Football) Dynamo Kyiv
17	MF	Artem Rybak	17 April 2009 (age 17)	3	0	(Royal Spanish Football Federation) Barcelona
20	MF	Arseniy-Tymofiy Trokhym	23 June 2009 (age 17)	3	0	(Ukrainian Association of Football) Shakhtar Donetsk
6	MF	Stanislav Shukalovych	1 August 2009 (age 17)	3	0	(Ukrainian Association of Football) Shakhtar Donetsk
8	MF	Danylo Yermak	14 August 2009 (age 17)	3	0	(Ukrainian Association of Football) Dynamo Kyiv
18	MF	Rostyslav Zipir	13 August 2009 (age 17)	2	0	(Austrian Football Association) Admira Wacker
10	FW	Volodymyr Kvikviniya	4 January 2009 (age 17)	3	0	(Ukrainian Association of Football) Dynamo Kyiv
21	FW	Daniil Yurchenko	13 May 2009 (age 17)	3	0	(Ukrainian Association of Football) Dynamo Kyiv
7	FW	Ivan Tretyakov	7 July 2009 (age 17)	3	0	(Ukrainian Association of Football) MFA Mukachevo
11	FW	Artur Kuryachyi	14 October 2009 (age 17)	3	0	(Ukrainian Association of Football) Shakhtar Donetsk
19	FW	Ihor Zadvornyi	1 March 2009 (age 17)	2	0	(German Football Association) Eintracht Frankfurt

=== Recent call-ups ===
The following players have been called up for the team within the last 12 months.

Pos.	Player	Date of birth (age)	Caps	Goals	Club	Latest call-up
GK	Maksym Royenko	21 January 2008 (age 18)	2	0	(Ukraine) Dynamo Kyiv	v. Venezuela, 24 June 2024
GK	Kyrylo Khadasevych	26 July 2008 (age 18)	2	0	(Germany) VfL Wolfsburg	v. Venezuela, 24 June 2024
GK	Yehor Krapivin	26 April 2008 (age 18)	2	0	(Spain) Espanyol	v. Luxembourg, 28 April 2024
GK	Ihor Kostenko	13 February 2008 (age 18)	1	0	(Portugal) Benfica	v. Luxembourg, 28 April 2024
DF	Yaroslav Mylokost	8 February 2008 (age 18)	6	1	(Ukraine) Shakhtar Donetsk	v. Venezuela, 24 June 2024
DF	Arsen Zalypka	9 May 2008 (age 18)	6	0	(Ukraine) Rukh Lviv	v. Venezuela, 24 June 2024
DF	Dmytro Solomon	27 August 2008 (age 18)	3	1	(Ukraine) Rukh Lviv	v. Venezuela, 24 June 2024
DF	Arseniy Koval	18 January 2008 (age 18)	3	0	(Ukraine) Dnipro-1	v. Venezuela, 24 June 2024
DF	Andriy Lysytskyi	20 January 2008 (age 18)	3	0	(Italy) Fiorentina	v. Venezuela, 24 June 2024
DF	Nazar Khlivnyuk	13 February 2008 (age 18)	2	0	(Germany) Fortuna Düsseldorf	v. Venezuela, 24 June 2024
DF	Nikita Melnyk	8 January 2008 (age 18)	3	0	(Italy) Imolese	v. Luxembourg, 28 April 2024
DF	Oleksiy Piskun	20 January 2008 (age 18)	3	0	(Ukraine) Rukh Lviv	v. Luxembourg, 28 April 2024
DF	Oleksandr Boyko	19 February 2008 (age 18)	3	0	(Belgium) Gent	v. Luxembourg, 28 April 2024
DF	Yehor Kostyuk (captain)	1 June 2008 (age 18)	3	0	(Ukraine) Shakhtar Donetsk	v. Luxembourg, 28 April 2024
DF	Volodymyr Umanskyi	27 July 2008 (age 18)	3	0	(Spain) Elche	v. Luxembourg, 28 April 2024
DF	Nikita Kalyuzhnyi	7 February 2008 (age 18)	2	0	(Ukraine) Shakhtar Donetsk	v. Luxembourg, 28 April 2024
MF	Oleksandr Kroytar	9 February 2008 (age 18)	6	1	(Ukraine) Rukh Lviv	v. Venezuela, 24 June 2024
MF	Ivan Andreyko	11 March 2008 (age 18)	6	0	(Ukraine) Dynamo Kyiv	v. Venezuela, 24 June 2024
MF	Oleksandr Sereda	15 January 2008 (age 18)	3	0	(Ukraine) Shakhtar Donetsk	v. Venezuela, 24 June 2024
MF	Nazar Ivaskiv	11 March 2008 (age 18)	3	0	(Ukraine) Dynamo Kyiv	v. Venezuela, 24 June 2024
MF	Danylo Slyva	16 April 2008 (age 18)	3	0	(Ukraine) Rukh Lviv	v. Venezuela, 24 June 2024
MF	Myroslav Romanyuk	15 May 2008 (age 18)	3	0	(Ukraine) Dynamo Kyiv	v. Venezuela, 24 June 2024
MF	Denys Khasanov	28 August 2008 (age 18)	3	0	(Germany) Viktoria Köln	v. Venezuela, 24 June 2024
MF	Karen Hevorkyan	11 October 2008 (age 18)	3	0	(Spain) Las Rozas	v. Venezuela, 24 June 2024
MF	Artem Korzh	23 May 2008 (age 18)	3	1	(Ukraine) Dnipro-1	v. Luxembourg, 28 April 2024
MF	Pavlo Lyusin	23 February 2008 (age 18)	3	0	(Ukraine) Dynamo Kyiv	v. Luxembourg, 28 April 2024
MF	Volodymyr Shelepinskyi	31 March 2008 (age 18)	3	0	(Ukraine) Rukh Lviv	v. Luxembourg, 28 April 2024
MF	Oleksandr Balakay	11 April 2008 (age 18)	3	0	(Ukraine) Shakhtar Donetsk	v. Luxembourg, 28 April 2024
MF	Illya Kutya	7 March 2008 (age 18)	2	0	(Croatia) Hajduk Split	v. Luxembourg, 28 April 2024
MF	Mukhammad Dzhurabayev	4 February 2008 (age 18)	1	0	(Ukraine) Rukh Lviv	v. Luxembourg, 28 April 2024
FW	Maksym Kucheriavyi	17 January 2008 (age 18)	3	0	(Ukraine) Dynamo Kyiv	v. Venezuela, 24 June 2024
FW	Zakhariy Zakharkiv	17 February 2008 (age 18)	3	0	(Ukraine) Kolos Kovalivka	v. Venezuela, 24 June 2024
FW	Dmytro Zudin	9 July 2008 (age 18)	3	2	(Croatia) Hajduk Split	v. Luxembourg, 28 April 2024
FW	Rolan Mustafayev	22 September 2008 (age 18)	3	2	(Ukraine) Rukh Lviv	v. Luxembourg, 28 April 2024
FW	Illya Menshykov	13 March 2008 (age 18)	3	1	Austria Wien	v. Luxembourg, 28 April 2024
FW	Artem Zubriy	7 April 2008 (age 18)	3	0	(Ukraine) Shakhtar Donetsk	v. Luxembourg, 28 April 2024

== See also ==
- Ukraine national football team
- Ukraine national under-21 football team
