= Republic of Ireland national under-17 football team =

Republic of Ireland Under-17
- Association: Football Association of Ireland
- Confederation: UEFA (Europe)
- Head coach: (Republic of Ireland) John Cotter (2026) (Republic of Ireland) Keith O'Halloran (2027)
- Most caps: Rory Finneran (29)
- Top scorer: Adam Idah (14)
- FIFA code: IRL
First colours	Second colours

First international
- Norway 2–2 vs Rep. of Ireland (Republic of Ireland) (Kongsvinger, Norway; 13 October 1985) (as U16s) (Republic of Ireland) Rep. of Ireland 4–0 vs Cyprus (Dublin, Ireland; 4 March 2002) (as U17s)

Biggest win
- (Republic of Ireland) Rep. of Ireland 8–0 vs Liechtenstein (Almaty, Kazakhstan; 19 October 2011)

Biggest defeat
- (Republic of Ireland) Rep. of Ireland 0–7 vs Germany (Rijeka, Croatia; 10 May 2017)

European Championship
- Appearances: 13 (first in 1988)
- Best result: Champions (1998)

FIFA U-17 World Cup
- Appearances: 2 (first in 2025)
- Best result: Round of 16 (2025)
Medal record
Men's football
UEFA European U-17 Championship Formerly U-16 Championship
Gold medal – first place	1998 Scotland

The Republic of Ireland national under-17 football team is the national under-17 football team of the Republic of Ireland and is controlled by the Football Association of Ireland and competes in the annual UEFA European Under-17 Championship and the biennial FIFA U-17 World Cup.

== History ==
The Republic of Ireland won the 1998 UEFA European Under-16 Championship in Scotland and the 1998 UEFA European Under-18 Championship. In March 2026, the team qualified for the World Cup in Qatar.

== Competitive record ==
=== FIFA Under-17 World Cup ===
The team had never qualified for the FIFA Under-17 World Cup (formerly the FIFA Under-17 World Championship and FIFA Under-16 World Championship) until 2025 which they'll be competing in November, the team also did not enter the 1985 edition.

FIFA U-17 World Cup record
Year	Round	Pld	W	D	L	GF	GA	Squad
FIFA Under-16 World Championship
(China) 1985	Did not enter							
(Canada) 1987	Did not qualify							
(Scotland) 1989	Did not qualify							
FIFA Under-17 World Championship
(Italy) 1991	Did not qualify							
(Japan) 1993	Did not qualify							
(Ecuador) 1995	Did not qualify							
(Egypt) 1997	Did not qualify							
(New Zealand) 1999	Did not qualify							
(Trinidad and Tobago) 2001	Did not qualify							
(Finland) 2003	Did not qualify							
(Peru) 2005	Did not qualify							
FIFA Under-17 World Cup
(South Korea) 2007	Did not qualify							
(Nigeria) 2009	Did not qualify							
(Mexico) 2011	Did not qualify							
(United Arab Emirates) 2013	Did not qualify							
(Chile) 2015	Did not qualify							
(India) 2017	Did not qualify							
(Brazil) 2019	Did not qualify							
(Peru) ~~2021~~	Cancelled due to COVID-19 pandemic							
(Indonesia) 2023	Did not qualify							
(Qatar) 2025	Round of 16	5	2	2	1	8	6	Squad
(Qatar) 2026	In progress	1	0	0	1	1	2	Squad
(Qatar) 2027	To be determined							
(Qatar) 2028	To be determined							
(Qatar) 2029	To be determined							
Total:2/21	Round of 16	6	2	2	2	9	8	-

=== UEFA European Under-17 Championship ===
The Republic of Ireland Under-17s have qualified for the UEFA European Under-17 Championship (formerly the UEFA European Under-16 Championship) 13 times, winning the competition in 1998. They hosted the 1994 and 2019 editions and finished in the group stage for both.

Year	Round	Pld	W	D	L	GF	GA	Squad
UEFA European Under-16 Championship
(Italy) 1982	Did not enter							
(West Germany) 1984	Did not enter							
(Hungary) 1985	Did not enter							
(Greece) 1986	Did not qualify							
(France) 1987	Did not qualify							
(Spain) 1988	Group stage	3	1	2	0	3	2	Squad
(Denmark) 1989	Did not qualify							
(East Germany) 1990	Did not qualify							
(Switzerland) 1991	Did not qualify							
(Cyprus) 1992	Group stage	3	0	2	1	1	3	Squad
(Turkey) 1993	Group stage	3	0	0	3	2	5	Squad
(Republic of Ireland) 1994	Group stage	3	0	1	2	1	5	Squad
(Belgium) 1995	Did not qualify							
(Austria) 1996	Quarter-final	4	2	1	1	2	2	Squad
(Germany) 1997	Did not qualify							
(Scotland) 1998	Champions	6	5	1	0	9	1	Squad
(Czech Republic) 1999	Did not qualify							
(Israel) 2000	Group stage	3	1	0	2	2	5	Squad
(England) 2001	Did not qualify							
UEFA European Under-17 Championship
(Denmark) 2002	Did not qualify							
(Portugal) 2003	Did not qualify							
(France) 2004	Did not qualify							
(Italy) 2005	Did not qualify (Elite round)							
(Luxembourg) 2006	Did not qualify (Elite round)							
(Belgium) 2007	Did not qualify (Elite round)							
(Turkey) 2008	Group stage	3	0	0	3	2	6	Squad
(Germany) 2009	Did not qualify							
(Liechtenstein) 2010	Did not qualify (Elite round)							
(Serbia) 2011	Did not qualify (Elite round)							
(Slovenia) 2012	Did not qualify (Elite round)							
(Slovakia) 2013	Did not qualify (Elite round)							
(Malta) 2014	Did not qualify (Elite round)							
(Bulgaria) 2015	Group stage	3	0	1	2	0	3	Squad
(Azerbaijan) 2016	Did not qualify (Elite round)							
(Croatia) 2017	Quarter-final	4	1	0	3	2	10	Squad
(England) 2018	Quarter-final	4	2	1	1	4	3	Squad
(Republic of Ireland) 2019	Group stage	3	0	3	0	3	3	Squad
(Estonia) ~~2020~~	Cancelled due to COVID-19 pandemic							
(Cyprus) ~~2021~~	Cancelled due to COVID-19 pandemic							
(Israel) 2022	Did not qualify (Elite round)							
(Hungary) 2023	Quarter-final	4	2	0	2	8	10	Squad
(Cyprus) 2024	Did not qualify							
(Albania) 2025	Did not qualify							
(Estonia) 2026	Did not qualify							
(Latvia) 2027	Did not qualify							
(Lithuania) 2028	To be determined							
(Moldova) 2029	To be determined							

== Results and fixtures ==
The following is a list of match results in the last 12 months, as well as any future matches that have been scheduled.

Legend

Win Draw Lose Fixture

=== 2025 ===
11 November 2025 FIFA U-17 World Cup Group J	Republic of Ireland	0–0	Paraguay	Al Rayyan, Qatar
13:30		Report		Stadium: Aspire Zone; Referee: Filip Dujic (Canada)

14 November 2025 FIFA U-17 World Cup - Round of 32	Republic of Ireland	1–1 (9–8 p)	Canada	Al Rayyan, Qatar
15:15	Michael Noonan 65'	Report	Sergei Kozlovskiy 85'	Stadium: Aspire Zone, Al Rayyan; Referee: Jelly Chavani (South Africa)
	Penalties
	Michael Noonan (penalty scored); Finn Sherlock (penalty scored); Jaden Umeh (penalty scored); Vinnie Leonard (penalty scored); Oisin McDonagh (penalty missed); Kian McMahon-Brown (penalty scored); Rory Finneran (penalty scored); Victor Ozhianvuna (penalty scored); Grady McDonnell (penalty scored); Ryan Butler (penalty scored)		Kevin Khan (penalty missed); Aiyenero (penalty scored); Sergei Kozlovskiy (penalty scored); Van Parker (penalty scored); Dylan Judelson (penalty scored); Aghilas Sadek (penalty scored); Johnny Selemani (penalty scored); Sahil Deo (penalty scored); Josh-Duc Nteziryayo (penalty scored); Elijah Roche (penalty missed)

18 November 2025 FIFA U-17 World Cup - Round of 16	Switzerland	3–1	Republic of Ireland	Al Rayyan, Qatar
14:45	Adrien Llukes 57'; Sandro Wyss 69'; Mladen Mijajlovic 88'	Report	Vinnie Leonard 82'	Stadium: Aspire Zone; Referee: Mohammed Ahmed Al Shammari (Qatar)

=== 2026 ===
11 February Friendly	Hungary	0–1	Republic of Ireland	Cádiz, Spain
14:00		Report	Hugh Martin 75'	Stadium: FairPlay Golf Resort

14 February Friendly	Republic of Ireland	1–2	Hungary	Cádiz, Spain
10:00	Josh Harpur 69'	Report	Andrej Vasiljevic 21'; Marcell Gyánó 85'	Stadium: FairPlay Golf Resort

25 March 2026 UEFA U-17 Euro qualifying Group A7	Republic of Ireland	3–0	Poland	Brzeg, Poland
14:00	Cillian Murphy 45+1'; Joe Carroll-Byrne 48'; Ryan Sheridan 84'	Report		Stadium: MOSiR Brzeg; Referee: Yura Mahtesyan (Armenia)

28 March 2026 UEFA U-17 Euro qualifying Group A7	Republic of Ireland	0–2	Croatia	Opole, Poland
12:30		Report	Jakov Dedić 9', 29'	Stadium: Odra Opole; Referee: Miloš Savović (Montenegro)

31 March 2026 UEFA U-17 Euro qualifying Group A7	Slovakia	0–7	Republic of Ireland	Brzeg, Poland
15:00		Report	Cillian Murphy 8', 20', 39'; Ryan Sheridan 29'; Josh Harpur 55'; Joey Wuna 61' (pen.); Desmond Armstrong 75'	Stadium: MOSiR Brzeg; Referee: Miloš Savović (Montenegro)

23 September Friendly	England	5–1	Republic of Ireland	Burton, England
18:30	Heze Grimwade 23'; Xavier Parker 47'; Josh Henry 56'; Darren Motsi 75'; Josh Blake 90+1'	Report	Ronan Keating 90'	Stadium: St George's Park; Referee: Elliot Cowens (England)

25 September Friendly	Georgia	2–2 (6–5 p)	Republic of Ireland	Warsaw, Poland
15:00	Jumber Dumbadze 69'; TBC (o.g.)	Report	Ciaran Daly 31'; Ciaran Daly 33'; Jayden Marshall (yellow card) 89' (yellow-red card)	Stadium: Stadium Aktywna Warszawa

27 September Friendly	Poland	2–1	Republic of Ireland	Ząbki, Poland
11:00	Franciszek Stępniewski 8'; Oskar Putrzyński 58'	Report	Ronan Keating 20'	Stadium: Dozbud Arena Ząbki; Referee: Kamil Chmielewski (Poland)

30 September Friendly	Republic of Ireland	3–2	Czech Republic	Sulejówek, Poland
11:00	Corey Fay 26'; Ronan Keating 29'; Filip Rucka 87' (o.g.)	Report	TBC 59'; TBC 80'	Stadium: Sulejówek Municipal Stadium

30 September Friendly	United States	1–1 (4–5 p)	Republic of Ireland	Malaga, Spain
11:00	Deven Cadigan 14'	Report	Cillian Murphy 74'	Stadium: Banus Football Centre

3 October Friendly	Republic of Ireland	0–1	Netherlands	Malaga, Spain
15:00		Report	Jerayno Hunte 24'	Stadium: La Quinta

6 October Friendly	Republic of Ireland	1–1	Norway	Malaga, Spain
12:00	Hugh Martin 90'	Report	Abel Cedergren 53'	Stadium: Marbella Football Centre

11 November 2027 UEFA U-17 Euro qualifying Group 1	Republic of Ireland	5–0	Estonia	Helsingør, Denmark
11:00	Ciaran Daly 27' (pen.); Ciaran Daly 58'; Ciaran Daly 65' (pen.); Ronan Keating 67'; Corey Fay 71'	Report		Stadium: Helsingør Stadium; Referee: Tural Kurbanov (Azerbaijan)

14 November 2027 UEFA U-17 Euro qualifying Group 1	Republic of Ireland	0–2	Wales	Helsingør, Denmark
11:00		Report	Cynan Holdsworth 57'; Lucas Roberts 69'	Stadium: Helsingør Stadium; Referee: Arnes Talic (Austria)

17 November 2027 UEFA U-17 Euro qualifying Group 1	Denmark	4–1	Republic of Ireland	Brøndby, Denmark
14:00	Tobias Ekstrand 16' (pen.); Johan Mortensen 24'; Tristan Christensen 27'; Tobias Ekstrand 49' (pen.)	Report	Jayden Marshall 30'	Stadium: Brøndby Stadium; Referee: Arnes Talic (Austria)

21 November 2026 FIFA U-17 World Cup Group I	Brazil	2–1	Republic of Ireland	Al Rayyan, Qatar
15:00 (18:00 UTC+3)	Rodrigo Junior 30'; Eduardo Conceição 71'	Report	Ryan Sheridan 44'	Stadium: Aspire Zone; Referee: Mohamed El Baroudi (Morocco)

24 November 2026 FIFA U-17 World Cup Group I	Costa Rica	v	Republic of Ireland	Al Rayyan, Qatar
12:30 (15:30 UTC+3)		Report		Stadium: Aspire Zone

27 November 2026 FIFA U-17 World Cup Group I	Republic of Ireland	v	Tanzania	Al Rayyan, Qatar
14:00 (17:00 UTC+3)		Report		Stadium: Aspire Zone

== Honours ==
- UEFA European Under-17 Championship, formerly UEFA European Under-16 Championship
  - Champions (1998)

== Players ==
=== Current squad ===
Players born on or after 1 January 2009 are eligible for the 2026 FIFA U-17 World Cup campaign.

Players born on or after 1 January 2010 are eligible for the 2027 UEFA European Under-17 Championship qualification campaign.

The following players were named in the squad for the 2026 FIFA U-17 World Cup in November 2026.

Caps and goals correct as of 21 November 2026, after the match against Brazil.

No.	Pos.	Player	Date of birth (age)	Caps	Goals	Club
1	GK	Darragh Brunton	1 June 2009 (age 17)	11	0	(Football Association of Ireland) St Patrick's Athletic
16	GK	George Moloney	17 November 2009 (age 17)	6	0	(The Football Association) Southampton
21	GK	Xander Grieves	13 April 2009 (age 17)	4	0	(The Football Association) Southampton
2	DF	Maxim Afonin	6 February 2010 (age 16)	9	0	(Football Association of Ireland) Shamrock Rovers
3	DF	Danny Burke	17 January 2009 (age 17)	9	0	(Football Association of Ireland) Shamrock Rovers
4	DF	Sean Spaight	25 January 2009 (age 17)	21	0	(Football Association of Ireland) Dundalk
5	DF	Kian Quigley (captain)	28 February 2009 (age 17)	14	0	(Football Association of Ireland) St Patrick's Athletic
13	DF	Jayden Marshall	31 January 2010 (age 16)	6	1	(Italian Football Federation) Como
19	DF	Josh O'Connor	9 June 2009 (age 17)	12	0	(Football Association of Ireland) St Patrick's Athletic
6	MF	Tom McGrath	7 March 2009 (age 17)	13	0	(Football Association of Ireland) Cork City
7	MF	Cillian Murphy	22 July 2009 (age 17)	13	6	(Football Association of Ireland) Cork City
8	MF	Josh O'Dwyer	17 March 2010 (age 16)	14	0	(Austrian Football Association) Liefering
10	MF	Ryan Sheridan	31 March 2009 (age 17)	15	4	(Football Association of Ireland) St Patrick's Athletic
15	MF	Richard Ferizaj	13 February 2009 (age 17)	2	0	(Football Association of Ireland) Bray Wanderers
20	MF	Jayden Goad	18 May 2009 (age 17)	2	0	(Football Association of Ireland) UCD
9	FW	Desmond Armstrong	27 November 2009 (age 16)	6	1	(French Football Federation) Lorient
11	FW	Joe Carroll-Byrne	3 August 2009 (age 17)	13	2	(Football Association of Ireland) St Patrick's Athletic
12	FW	Corey Fay	18 October 2010 (age 16)	7	2	(Football Association of Ireland) Shamrock Rovers
14	FW	Hugh Martin	1 January 2010 (age 16)	6	2	(Football Association of Ireland) Bohemians
17	FW	Joey Wuna	19 August 2009 (age 17)	10	1	(Football Association of Ireland) Shelbourne
18	FW	Ronan Keating	9 March 2011 (age 15)	8	4	(Football Association of Ireland) Galway United

=== Recent call-ups ===
The following players have also been called up to the Republic of Ireland under-17 squad and remain eligible:

Pos.	Player	Date of birth (age)	Caps	Goals	Club	Latest call-up
GK	Charlie McGarvey	11 April 2010 (age 16)	6	0	(Republic of Ireland) Sligo Rovers	v. Denmark, 17 November 2026
GK	Seb Clarke	23 September 2010 (age 16)	0	0	(Republic of Ireland) St Patrick's Athletic	v. Denmark, 17 November 2026
GK	Alex Byrne	14 January 2010 (age 16)	2	0	(Republic of Ireland) Shamrock Rovers	v. Czech Republic, 30 September 2026
DF	Charlie Nolan	25 February 2010 (age 16)	7	0	(Republic of Ireland) Shamrock Rovers	v. Denmark, 17 November 2026
DF	Christian Kroman	7 October 2010 (age 16)	6	0	(Republic of Ireland) St Patrick's Athletic	v. Denmark, 17 November 2026
DF	Joe McKeon	30 June 2010 (age 16)	6	0	(Republic of Ireland) Shelbourne	v. Denmark, 17 November 2026
DF	Jack Corbally	12 December 2010 (age 15)	3	0	(Republic of Ireland) Bohemians	v. Denmark, 17 November 2026
DF	Aidan Gabbidon	23 January 2009 (age 17)	11	1	(Republic of Ireland) Sligo Rovers	v. Norway, 6 October 2026
DF	Glen Ilunga	20 November 2009 (age 17)	3	0	(England) Burnley	v. Norway, 6 October 2026
DF	Rian Ennis	23 February 2010 (age 16)	2	0	(Republic of Ireland) Shamrock Rovers	v. Czech Republic, 30 September 2026
DF	Tadhg Prizeman	13 April 2009 (age 17)	8	0	(Republic of Ireland) Shamrock Rovers	v. Slovakia, 31 March 2026
DF	Ike Manjor-Georgewill	19 February 2009 (age 17)	1	0	(Republic of Ireland) Cork City	v. Hungary, 11 February 2026
MF	Ciaran Daly	24 June 2010 (age 16)	7	5	(Republic of Ireland) Shamrock Rovers	v. Denmark, 17 November 2026
MF	Bobby Zeller	3 August 2010 (age 16)	7	0	(Republic of Ireland) Shamrock Rovers	v. Denmark, 17 November 2026
MF	Rhys Williams	27 October 2010 (age 16)	6	0	(Republic of Ireland) St Patrick's Athletic	v. Denmark, 17 November 2026
MF	Cillian Phillips	5 June 2010 (age 16)	5	0	(Republic of Ireland) Shelbourne	v. Denmark, 17 November 2026
MF	Adrian Rascau	11 January 2010 (age 16)	4	0	(Republic of Ireland) Bohemians	v. Denmark, 17 November 2026
MF	Johnny Collins	2 March 2010 (age 16)	1	0	(Republic of Ireland) Shamrock Rovers	v. Denmark, 17 November 2026
MF	Caleb Sweeney	1 January 2009 (age 17)	2	0	(Denmark) Brøndby	v. Norway, 6 October 2026
MF	Kai Morrall	5 February 2010 (age 16)	4	0	(England) Leeds United	v. Czech Republic, 30 September 2026
MF	Aydin Aliyev	5 January 2010 (age 16)	4	0	(Germany) Greuther Fürth	v. Czech Republic, 30 September 2026
MF	Victor Ozhianvuna	10 January 2009 (age 17)	15	0	(Republic of Ireland) Shamrock Rovers	v. Slovakia, 31 March 2026
MF	Jason Spelman	2 April 2009 (age 17)	5	0	(Republic of Ireland) St Patrick's Athletic	v. Slovakia, 31 March 2026
MF	Curtis Egan	4 January 2009 (age 17)	4	1	(Republic of Ireland) Bohemians	v. Hungary, 11 February 2026
MF	Brody Collins	19 July 2009 (age 17)	1	0	(Germany) Schalke 04	v. Hungary, 11 February 2026
MF	Niall Sullivan	11 February 2009 (age 17)	5	0	(Republic of Ireland) St Patrick's Athletic	v. Austria, 14 October 2025
FW	Sheikhan Aljabir	8 June 2010 (age 16)	7	0	(Portugal) Benfica	v. Denmark, 17 November 2026
FW	Jamie O'Donnell	24 June 2010 (age 16)	6	0	(Republic of Ireland) Sligo Rovers	v. Denmark, 17 November 2026
FW	Ben Lyne	3 July 2011 (age 15)	4	0	(England) Manchester United	v. Denmark, 17 November 2026
FW	David Dunne	1 February 2009 (age 17)	15	0	(France) Monaco	v. Norway, 6 October 2026
FW	Ben Mahon	6 March 2009 (age 17)	8	4	(Republic of Ireland) Shamrock Rovers	v. Norway, 6 October 2026
FW	Michael McColgan		3	0	(Republic of Ireland) Derry City	v. Czech Republic, 30 September 2026
FW	Josh Harpur	27 August 2009 (age 17)	6	2	(Italy) Como	v. Slovakia, 31 March 2026
FW	TJ Molloy	4 April 2009 (age 17)	7	3	(Northern Ireland) Armagh City	v. Hungary, 11 February 2026
FW	Archie Quinn	14 January 2010 (age 16)	4	0	(Republic of Ireland) Shelbourne	v. Austria, 14 October 2025
^{U21} With U21 squad^{U19} With U19 squad^{INJ} Withdrew from latest squad due to injury^{WD} Withdrew from latest squad^{SUS} Player is suspended

Note: Names in italics denote players that have been capped for the senior team.

=== Under-16 Squad ===
Under 16 squad managed by Graham Gartland for friendlies against France on 15 and 17 September 2026 in France.

No.	Pos.	Player	Date of birth (age)	Caps	Goals	Club
	GK	Jake Morgan		2	0	(Irish Football Association) Coleraine
	GK	Davin Quinn		1	0	(Football Association of Ireland) Shamrock Rovers
	DF	Tom Casey		3	0	(Football Association of Ireland) Shamrock Rovers
	DF	Sean Kelly		4	0	(Football Association of Ireland) Galway United
	DF	Robert Morgan		4	0	(Football Association of Ireland) St Patrick's Athletic
	DF	Gearoid Moran		4	0	(Football Association of Ireland) Shelbourne
	DF	Jamie Jacob		2	0	(Football Association of Ireland) Shamrock Rovers
	DF	Ryan Savage		2	0	(Irish Football Association) Linfield
	DF	Isaac Ogunrinde	26 August 2011 (age 15)	2	0	(The Football Association) Crystal Palace
	MF	Fionnann O’Snodaigh		4	0	(Football Association of Ireland) Bray Wanderers
	MF	Charlie Bonner		2	0	(Football Association of Ireland) Finn Harps
	MF	Joe Manicle		2	0	(Football Association of Ireland) Shamrock Rovers
	MF	Jorunas Jakas		2	0	(Football Association of Ireland) St Patrick's Athletic
	MF	Billy Carney		2	0	(Football Association of Ireland) Waterford
	MF	Roman Gallagher		4	0	(The Football Association) Manchester City
	FW	Ronan Keating	9 March 2011 (age 15)	4	2	(Football Association of Ireland) Galway United
	FW	Destiny Okharedia		3	0	(Football Association of Ireland) Cork City
	FW	Darragh Nolan		3	0	(Football Association of Ireland) Shelbourne
	FW	Conor Hudson		3	1	(Football Association of Ireland) St Patrick's Athletic
	FW	Harry Rehill		2	0	(Football Association of Ireland) Shamrock Rovers

== Records ==
- Top Goals: Adam Idah – 14 Goals
- Most Appearances: Rory Finneran – 29 Appearances
- Youngest Goal Scorer: Evan Ferguson – 15 years 24 Days vs Moldova (2019)
- Biggest Win: 8-0 vs Liechtenstein (2011)
- Biggest Defeat: 0–7 vs Germany (2017)
- Youngest Player: Evan Ferguson – 14 years 10 months 18 days vs Russia (2019)

== See also ==
- UEFA European Under-17 Football Championship
- FIFA U-17 World Cup
- Republic of Ireland (senior) team
- Republic of Ireland national under-21 football team
- Republic of Ireland national under-19 football team
