= Victor Ozhianvuna =

Irish footballer (born 2009)

Personal information
- Full name: Victor Ozhianvuna
- Date of birth: 10 January 2009 (age 17)
- Place of birth: Tallaght, County Dublin, Ireland
- Height: 1.72 m (5 ft 8 in)
- Position: Midfielder

Team information
- Current team: Shamrock Rovers
- Number: 36

Youth career
- 2015–: Shamrock Rovers

Senior career*
Years	Team	Apps	(Gls)
2025–	Shamrock Rovers	31	(0)

International career^{‡}
2023–2024	Republic of Ireland U15	9	(1)
2025–	Republic of Ireland U17	15	(0)
- * Club domestic league appearances and goals as of 17:39, 9 November 2026 (UTC) ‡ National team caps and goals as of 17:25, 31 March 2026 (UTC)

Victor Ozhianvuna (born 10 January 2009) is an Irish professional footballer who plays as a midfielder for League of Ireland Premier Division club Shamrock Rovers. In January 2027, he will join Premier League club Arsenal.

== Club career ==
=== Youth career ===
Born in Tallaght to Russian and Nigerian parents, Ozhianvuna began playing football with the academy of local League of Ireland club Shamrock Rovers. In May 2022, he featured in the side that defeated Midleton 1–0 in the Under-13 National Cup Final at Turners Cross.

=== Shamrock Rovers ===
On 17 January 2025, Ozhianvuna made his first senior appearance for Shamrock Rovers, coming off the bench at half time in a 4–0 win over Usher Celtic in the Leinster Senior Cup. He made his league debut for the club on 16 February 2025, replacing Daniel Cleary from the bench in the 69th minute of a 1–0 loss in the Dublin Derby against Bohemians in front of a record League of Ireland Premier Division crowd of 33,208 at the Aviva Stadium. On 20 February 2025, he made the first European appearance of his career, replacing Josh Honohan from the bench in the 105th minute of his side's UEFA Conference League Knockout phase play-off second leg against Molde, in which they were defeated on penalties. In April 2025, he was linked with a move to Premier League club Arsenal on a pre-contract agreement to join the club in January 2027 when he turns 18. On 18 July 2025, he scored his first goal at senior level of his career, opening the scoring in a 4–0 win over Wexford in the FAI Cup at Tallaght Stadium. On 25 May 2026, he was substituted off injured in a 2–1 win away to rivals Bohemians, with the recovery period keeping him out of action for several months with the injury being "growth related". In September 2026, with Ozhianvuna still not made an appearance since his injury in May, Rovers manager Stephen Bradley stated that he feared he had played his final game for the club, with a month to go in the season and Ozhianvuna departing for Arsenal at the end of the season.

=== Arsenal ===
On 3 October 2025, it was announced that Ozhianvuna had signed a pre-contract to join Premier League club Arsenal in January 2027 when he turns 18 years old, in line with Brexit ruling, with the fee believed to be in the region of £1.7 million plus add ons and a sell on clause.

== Style of play ==
Ozhianvuna is known for his excellent dribbling ability and being comfortable off either foot, while his positional versatility has also been widely praised. He began his senior career playing as a wing-back, with Shamrock Rovers manager Stephen Bradley stating in April 2025 that

"It's about finding the right moments to play him but ability? You'll see in the next years what he's about. He can play anywhere. I've seen him play as a six, ten and even up front. He's a bit of throwback in how he plays fearlessly. You can see that versatility will help him going forward."

== International career ==
In November 2023, he received his first international call up to the Republic of Ireland U15 side, for a UEFA Development Tournament in Serbia. He made his debut on 21 November 2023 in a 3–1 win over Greece U15. On 26 November 2023, he scored his first international goal in a 3–1 win over Venezuela U15 to win the tournament. Ozhianvuna received his first call up to the Republic of Ireland U17 squad in March 2025. He made his debut for the U17s on 25 March 2025 in a 5–0 win over Iceland U17. Ozhianvuna was named in the squad for the 2025 FIFA U-17 World Cup in Qatar in November 2025.

== Career statistics ==
As of match played on 25 May 2026

Appearances and goals by club, season and competition
Club	Division	Season	League		FAI Cup		Europe		Other		Total	
Club	Division	Season	Apps	Goals	Apps	Goals	Apps	Goals	Apps	Goals	Apps	Goals
Shamrock Rovers	2025	LOI Premier Division	13	0	1	1	3 (Note: Appearances in UEFA Conference League)	0	1 (Note: Appearance in Leinster Senior Cup)	0	18	1
Shamrock Rovers	2026	LOI Premier Division	18	0	0	0	0	0	1 (Note: Appearance in President of Ireland's Cup)	0	19	0
Shamrock Rovers	Career total		31	0	1	1	3	0	2	0	37	1
