= Serhiy Perkhun =

Ukrainian footballer

- Perkhun with PFC CSKA Moscow in 2001

Personal information
- Full name: Serhiy Volodymyrovych Perkhun
- Date of birth: 4 September 1977
- Place of birth: Dnipropetrovsk, Ukrainian SSR, USSR
- Date of death: 28 August 2001 (aged 23)
- Place of death: Moscow, Russia
- Height: 1.90 m (6 ft 3 in)
- Position: Goalkeeper

Youth career
- 1984–1993: Dnipro-75 Dnipropetrovsk

Senior career*
Years	Team	Apps	(Gls)
1993–1998	Dnipro Dnipropetrovsk	23	(0)
1995	→ Metalurh Novomoskovsk (loan)	7	(0)
1997–1998	→ Dnipro-2 Dnipropetrovsk	5	(0)
1999–2000	Sheriff Tiraspol	29	(0)
2001	CSKA Moscow	13	(0)
Total		77	(0)

International career
1994	Ukraine U16	1	(0)
1997–1998	Ukraine U21	2	(0)
2001	Ukraine	1	(0)
Medal record
Men's football
Representing Ukraine
UEFA European Under-16 Championship
Third place	1994 Republic of Ireland
- * Club domestic league appearances and goals

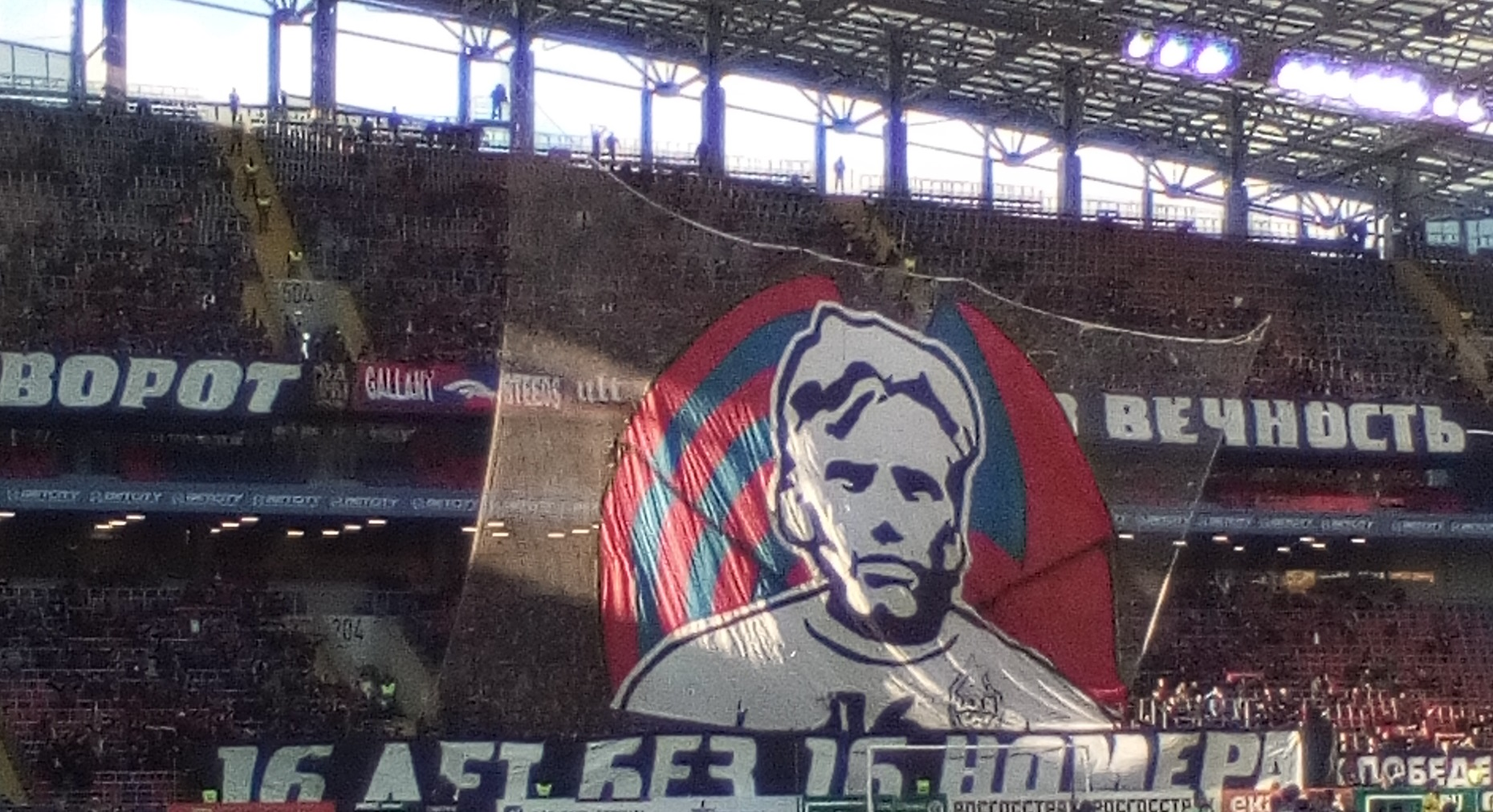
Perhun banner.jpg

Serhiy Volodymyrovych Perkhun (Ukrainian: Сергій Володимирович Перхун; 4 September 1977 – 28 August 2001) was a Ukrainian footballer. He is the only player to date in the history of the Russian Premier League to die from injuries sustained during an official game.

== Career ==
In 1993–1998, he played for FC Dnipro Dnipropetrovsk. In 1999–2000, he was a first choice goalkeeper for Sheriff Tiraspol. In 2001, he was a first choice goalkeeper for CSKA Moscow.

Serhiy was also capped by the Ukraine national football team in a friendly game against Latvia on 15 August 2001, just 4 days before the accident that led to his death on the 28th. He played in the second half of the match.

He is the youngest player, as of August 2020, in the history of the top league of the Ukrainian football, making his debut at the age of 16 years and 34 days in the game for FC Dnipro Dnipropetrovsk against FC Kryvbas Kryvyi Rih on 8 October 1993 in the Ukrainian Premier League (then Vyshcha Liha).

== Death ==
On 19 August 2001, during the game against Anzhi Makhachkala, Perkhun collided with Budun Budunov. Perkhun died nine days later from a brain hemorrhage, whilst Budunov sustained several head injuries. CSKA Moscow has retired number 16 to honor Perkhun's legacy.

== Honours ==
- 1998–99 Moldovan Cup (Sheriff Tiraspol)
- 1994 UEFA European Under-16 Championship (third runner)

== See also ==
- List of association footballers who died while playing
