= Omar Mishkov =

Ukrainian association football player (1977–2001)

Personal information
- Full name: Omar Fauazovych Mishkov
- Date of birth: 10 November 1977
- Place of birth: Odesa, Ukrainian SSR
- Date of death: 6 September 2001 (aged 23)
- Place of death: Oleksandriya, Ukraine
- Height: 1.77 m (5 ft 10 in)
- Position: Defender

Youth career
- SDYuShOR Chornomorets

Senior career*
Years	Team	Apps	(Gls)
1994–1995	Chornomorets-2 Odesa	16	(1)
1994–1995	→ Torpedo Odesa	1	(0)
1996–1999	Shakhtar-2 Donetsk	73	(3)
2000–2001	Polihraftekhnika Oleksandriya	57	(0)
Total		147	(4)

International career
1994	Ukraine U16	8	(0)
Medal record
Men's football
Representing Ukraine
UEFA European Under-16 Championship
Third place	1994 Republic of Ireland
- * Club domestic league appearances and goals

Omar Fauazovych Mishkov (Ukrainian: Омар Фауазович Мішков; 10 November 1977 – 6 September 2001) was a Ukrainian professional footballer who played as a defender.

== Career ==
Mishkov was born in Odesa where started to play football. His first international success came to him before Mishkov started to play at professional level, when in spring he playing for Ukraine U-16 earned bronze medals at the 1994 UEFA European Under-16 Championship in Republic of Ireland. His first match at professional level Mishkov played on 13 August 1994 for Chornomorets-2 Odesa when he came out as a substitute for Heorhiy Melnykov in away loss 0:2 to FC Artania Ochakiv. After playing half a season for the second squad of Chornomorets, Mishkov was loaned to FC Torpedo Odesa that played in amateur competitions and the Odesa Oblast championship.

Next season Mishkov joined FC Shakhtar Donetsk where he played mostly for its second squad as well. Mishkov stayed in Donetsk for some 3.5 years before in 2000 joining Polihraftekhnika Oleksandriya that was playing in the Persha Liha (tier-2). In Polihraftekhnika Mishkov quickly earned a solid place in the club's first team and in 2001 his team earned promotion to the Vyshcha Liha. In Vyshcha Liha he played 9 games.

On 5 September 2001 players of Polihraftekhnika Omar Mishkov and Vadym Chernyshenko along with their friend who was at the steering wheel of the car were returning from fishing on outskirts of Oleksandriya. The driver was not able to handle the steering on one of the turns and the car ended up in a ditch. Chernyshenko and Mishkov were taken to the hospital, while their friend died on the site. However, on 6 September Omar Mishkov died as well from the injuries that he received at the car accident.

== Career statistics ==
=== Club ===
Club	Season	Tier	League		Cup		Europe		Total	
Club	Season	Tier	Apps	Goals	Apps	Goals	Apps	Goals	Apps	Goals
Chornomorets-2	1994-95	3rd	16	1	3	0	-	-	19	1
Torpedo	1994-95	Regional	1	0	-	-	-	-	1	0
Shakhtar-2	1995–96	3rd	14	0	1	0	-	-	15	0
Shakhtar-2	1996–97	3rd	11	0	2	0	-	-	13	0
Shakhtar-2	1997–98	3rd	13	1	-	-	-	-	13	1
Shakhtar-2	1998–99	2nd	20	2	-	-	-	-	20	2
Shakhtar-2	1999–00	2nd	15	0	-	-	-	-	15	0
Polihraftekhnika	1999-2000	2nd	16	0	1	0	-	-	17	0
Polihraftekhnika	2000-01	2nd	32	0	1	0	-	-	33	0
Polihraftekhnika	2001-02	1st	9	0	-	-	-	-	9	0
Career totals			147	4	8	0	-	-	155	4
