= Zeferino =

Zeferino is a Portuguese surname and given name. Notable people with the name include:

== Given name ==
- Zeferino (Portuguese footballer) (born 1978), Portuguese retired footballer
- João Zeferino da Costa (1840–1915), Brazilian painter and designer
- Zeferino Martins (born 1985), East Timorese footballer
- Zeferino Nandayapa (1931–2010), Mexican folk and classical marimba player
- Zeferino dos Prazeres, São Toméan politician
- Armando Zeferino Soares (1920–2007), Cape Verdean composer
- Zeferino Torreblanca (born 1954), Mexican politician and former Governor of Guerrero
- Zeferino González y Díaz Tuñón (1831–1894), Spanish Dominican theologian, and philosopher, Archbishop of Seville and Cardinal
- Zeferino Peña Cuéllar, known by his alias "Don Zefe", Mexican suspected drug lord
- Zeferino Vaz (1908–1981), led the construction, establishment and development of the Unicamp university, State of São Paulo, Brazil

== Surname ==
- Alfredo Juarez Zeferino (born 2000), Mexican-American farmworker advocate
- António Zeferino (born 1966), Cape Verdean athlete, specializing in long-distance running, marathon and half marathon
- Manuel Zeferino (born 1960), Portuguese cyclist

== See also ==
- Rodovia Professor Zeferino Vaz, a highway in the state of São Paulo, Brazil
- Ceferino
- Zephyrinus
