= Artem Rybak =

Ukrainian footballer (born 2010)

Personal information
- Full name: Artem Serhiyovych Rybak
- Date of birth: 17 April 2010 (age 16)
- Place of birth: Chernivtsi, Ukraine
- Height: 1.64 m (5 ft 5 in)
- Position: Midfielder

Team information
- Current team: Barcelona

Youth career
- Bukovyna Chernivtsi
- –2022: Shakhtar Donetsk
- 2022–: Barcelona

International career^{‡}
Years	Team	Apps	(Gls)
2024	Ukraine U15	3	(0)
2024–2026	Ukraine U16	13	(1)
2025–	Ukraine U17	11	(3)
- ‡ National team caps and goals as of 23:33, 11 November 2026 (UTC)

Artem Serhiyovych Rybak (Ukrainian: Артем Рибак; Russian: Артем Рыбак; born 17 April 2010) is a Ukrainian professional footballer who plays as a midfielder for Barcelona.

== Early life ==
Rybak was born on 17 April 2010 in Chernivtsi, Ukraine. A native of the city, he is the son of a futsal player father. Growing up, he attended Escola Lleó XIII in Spain.

== Club career ==
As a youth player, Rybak joined the youth academy of Bukovyna. Following his stint there, he joined the youth academy of Shakhtar.

Ahead of the 2022–23 season, he joined the youth academy of Spanish La Liga side Barcelona, helping the club's under-17 team win the 2025 Mundial Juvenil Sub-17 de Clubes. In 2026, he signed his first professional contract with them.

== International career ==
Rybak has represented Ukraine internationally at youth level and has represented the country internationally at under-15, under-16 and under-17 level. Altogether, he made three appearances and scored zero goals while playing for the Ukraine national under-15 team.

On 26 September 2024, he debuted for the under-16s during a 3–0 away friendly loss to England. During the autumn of 2025, he played for the under-17s in the 2026 UEFA European Under-17 Championship qualification.

== Style of play ==
Rybak plays as a midfielder and is left-footed. Spanish newspaper Sport wrote in 2024 that he "is very vertical and direct, always looking toward the opponent’s goal when the situation allows, yet he also knows how to shield the ball and slow down the tempo when necessary. An intelligent reading of the game is one of the key strengths... [he] plays as either an ‘8’ or a ‘10’. As an attacking central midfielder, he shines through his passing to the forwards and his skillful play when carrying the ball and breaking down defenses. These qualities have occasionally led his coaches to deploy him as a ‘false’ right winger, giving him more license to take risks and dribble".
