= Ceferino =

Ceferino is a given name. Notable people with the name include:

- Ceferino Garcia (1912–1981), champion boxer born in Naval, Biliran, Philippines
- Ceferino Giménez Malla (1861–1936), Spanish Roman Catholic catechist and activist for Spanish Romani causes
- Ceferino Labarda (born 1981), bantamweight boxer from Argentina
- Ceferino Namuncurá (1886–1905), saintly religious student venerated in northern Patagonia and throughout Argentina
- Ceferino Peroné (1924–2015), Argentine cyclist
- Ceferino Quintana (1894–1977), American politician

== See also ==
- Zeferino
- Zephyrinus
