= Michael Millett =

English footballer

Personal information
- Full name: Michael Paul Millett
- Date of birth: 22 September 1977
- Place of birth: Wigan, England
- Date of death: 21 September 1995 (aged 17)
- Place of death: Garswood, England
- Positions: Defender; midfielder

Youth career
- 1991–1994: Wigan Athletic

Senior career*
| Years | Team | Apps | (Gls) |
| 1994–1995 | Wigan Athletic | 3 | (0) |

International career
| 1993 | England schools | 7 | (0) |
| 1993–1994 | England U16 | 9 | (0) |
| 1995 | England U18 | 1 | (0) |
- * Club domestic league appearances and goals

Michael Millett (22 September 1977 – 21 September 1995) was an English footballer who played for Wigan Athletic. Millett was regarded as a talented youngster who could play in defence or midfield, and had represented England at youth level.

== Biography ==
Born in Wigan, Millett attended Byrchall High School in Ashton-in-Makerfield. He played schoolboy football for North Ashton before signing for Wigan Athletic at the age of 14.

Millett was an England schoolboy international, and played at the 1994 UEFA European Under-16 Championship. He made one appearance for the England under-18 team in February 1995.

He made his first-team debut for Wigan towards the end of the 1994–95 season. He played three league games and one League Cup match for the Latics.

On 21 September 1995, Millett was killed in a car crash, one day before his 18th birthday. The crash happened near Garswood, Merseyside.

Wigan Athletic's Academy Player of the Year Award is named in his honour.
