= Kurt Van De Paar =

Belgian footballer (born 1978)

Personal information
- Date of birth: 10 January 1978 (age 48)
- Place of birth: Beringen, Belgium
- Height: 1.76 m (5 ft 9 in)
- Position: Midfielder

Senior career*
Years	Team	Apps	(Gls)
1996–1998	Anderlecht	16	(0)
1998–2003	FC Twente	101	(9)
2003–2004	Trabzonspor	3	(0)
- * Club domestic league appearances and goals

Kurt Van De Paar (born 10 January 1978) is a Belgian former footballer who played as a midfielder. He represented R.S.C. Anderlecht in his native country, after which he went abroad to play for FC Twente in the Netherlands and Trabzonspor in Turkey.

== Honours ==
FC Twente

- KNVB Cup: 2000–01
