= Vaskë Ruko =

Albanian footballer

Personal information
- Date of birth: 15 July 1977 (age 49)
- Place of birth: Fier, Albania
- Positions: Midfielder; striker

Youth career
- –1998: Apolonia

Senior career*
Years	Team	Apps	(Gls)
1994–2003	Apolonia	163	(30)
2004	Këlcyra		
2005	Albpetrol		
2005	Këlcyra		
- * Club domestic league appearances and goals

Vaskë Ruko (born 15 July 1977) is an Albanian retired footballer who played for Apolonia Fier, Këlcyra and Albpetrol Patos.
