= Oleh Yashchuk =

Ukrainian footballer

Personal information
- Full name: Oleh Rostyslavovych Yashchuk
- Date of birth: 26 October 1977 (age 49)
- Place of birth: Hrybova, Ternopil Oblast, Soviet Union (now Ukraine)
- Height: 1.81 m (5 ft 11 in)
- Position: Forward

Youth career
- 1990–1993: Lviv Sports School
- 1993–1994: Lviv

Senior career*
Years	Team	Apps	(Gls)
1994	Lviv	2	(0)
1994	→ Krystal Chortkiv (loan)	1	(0)
1994–1996	Nyva Ternopil	34	(10)
1996–2006	Anderlecht	119	(31)
2006–2007	Ergotelis	26	(3)
2007–2013	Cercle Brugge	146	(43)
2013	→ Westerlo (loan)	13	(5)
2013–2014	BX Brussels		
Total		341	(92)

International career
1994	Ukraine U16	4	(3)
1995–1996	Ukraine U18	6	(2)
1998–1999	Ukraine U21	3	(2)
Medal record
Men's football
Representing Ukraine
UEFA European Under-16 Championship
Third place	1994 Republic of Ireland
- * Club domestic league appearances and goals

Oleg Yashchuk (Ukrainian: Олег Ростиславович Ящук, born 26 October 1977) is a Ukrainian former professional footballer who played as a forward. He spent most of his career in Belgium and also holds the Belgian nationality. His last name is sometimes transliterated as Iachtchouk or Jasjtsjoek. He now coaches the U14 division of R.S.C. Anderlecht.

== Club career ==
Iachtchouk was born in Hrybova (Hrynky Rural-rada), Lanivtsi Raion, Ternopil Oblast then Ukrainian SSR. He first made a name for himself in the Ukrainian Premier League in the 1995–96 season. Playing for an unfashionable Nyva Ternopil side, then a 17-year-old, on matchday 1 he scored a hat trick at Shakhtar Donetsk helping his side to a shock 4–2 away win. He finished the season as the club's top scorer with ten goals as Nyva narrowly avoided relegation.

Iachtchouk's talent caught the eye of Anderlecht and he signed for the Belgian club at the end of the season. He made a good start in the first team in the 1990s but then became injured for long periods of time. In some seasons he barely played at all because of recurring injuries, yet Anderlecht extended his contract in 2001 for another five years. In 2006, he left the club, having played 119 league matches and scored 31 goals during ten seasons.

He signed for Ergotelis in Greece for the 2006–07 season where he finally managed to shake off his injury problems.

On 14 June 2007, Iachtchouk returned to Belgium, signing a two-year contract with Cercle Brugge who had just appointed his former Anderlecht teammate Glen De Boeck as manager. In January 2009 his contract was extended until 2013, just days after he scored both of his team's goals in a 2–1 win against his former club Anderlecht.

== International career ==
Yashchuk has played for all of Ukraine's youth national teams (Under-16, Under-18 and Under-21), including a spell alongside Andriy Shevchenko for the Under-18s. In 1994, he became his team's best scorer at the European Under-16 Championship in Ireland where Ukraine finished third. One of the three goals Iachtchouk scored at the tournament was against Belgium.

However, Iachtchouk has not won a single full international cap due to persistent injuries. After he finally recovered he found that his dual Ukrainian and Belgian citizenship is a major obstacle to his call-up for Ukraine; while he did not see himself playing for his new home country.

== Awards and honours ==
Anderlecht

- Belgian First Division: 1999–2000, 2000–01, 2003–04, 2005–06
- Belgian Supercup: 2000, 2001

Individual

- Ukraine top scorer at Euro Under-16: 1994
- Nyva Ternopil top scorer: 1995-96
- Cercle Brugge top scorer: 2007–08, 2008–09
- Cercle Brugge player of the season (Pop Poll d'Echte): 2008–09, 2009–10

== See also ==
- Belgian nationality law
- Ukrainian citizenship
