= 1994 UEFA European Under-16 Championship =

1994 UEFA Under-16 Championship
Tournament details
- Host country: Ireland
- Dates: 26 April – 8 May
- Teams: 16 (from 1 confederation)
- Venues: 14 (in 7 host cities)

Final positions
- Champions: Turkey (1st title)
- Runners-up: Denmark
- Third place: Ukraine
- Fourth place: Austria

Tournament statistics
- Matches played: 32
- Goals scored: 93 (2.91 per match)

The 1994 UEFA European Under-16 Championship was the 12th edition of the UEFA's European Under-16 Football Championship. Players born on or after 1 August 1977 were eligible to participate in this competition. Ireland hosted the 16 teams that contested April and May 1994.

Poland did not defend its title.

Turkey defeated Denmark to win its first title.

== Venues ==
Locations of venues in the Ireland	Locations of Dublin venues
Group A (County Louth); Group B (North Dublin); Group C (Munster); Group D (South Dublin). All knockout games were played in Dublin, except for one played in Oriel Park, Dundalk.

== Participants ==
- Albania
- Austria
- Belarus
- Belgium
- Czechoslovakia
- Denmark
- England
- Germany
- Republic of Ireland
- Iceland
- Portugal
- Russia
- Spain
- Switzerland
- Turkey
- Ukraine

== Group stage ==
=== Group A ===
Team	Pld	W	D	L	GF	GA	GD	Pts
Belarus	3	1	2	0	3	2	+1	5
Austria	3	1	2	0	3	2	+1	5
Spain	3	1	1	1	5	2	+3	4
Albania	3	0	1	2	1	6	−5	1

26 April 1994

Spain	0–1	Belarus
		Ryndzyuk 65'

United Park, Drogheda
Referee: Hermann Albrecht (Germany)

26 April 1994

Austria	1–0	Albania

Oriel Park, Dundalk
Referee: Richard O'Hanlon (Republic of Ireland)

28 April 1994

Belarus	1–1	Albania

United Park, Drogheda
Referee: Brendan Shorte (Republic of Ireland)

28 April 1994

Spain	1–1	Austria
Juli 29'		Michael Klein 39'

Oriel Park, Dundalk
Referee: José Pratas (Portugal)

30 April 1994

Belarus	1–1	Austria
Penalties
	4–3

United Park, Drogheda
Referee: Vladimír Hriňák (Slovakia)

30 April 1994

Albania	0–4	Spain
		Cabello 20'; Etxeberria 30', 51'; Rubén García 34'

Oriel Park, Dundalk
Referee: Knud Erik Fisker (Denmark)

=== Group B ===
Team	Pld	W	D	L	GF	GA	GD	Pts
England	3	2	1	0	4	2	+2	7
Portugal	3	2	0	1	5	1	+4	6
Czechoslovakia	3	1	0	2	2	4	−2	3
Republic of Ireland	3	0	1	2	1	5	−4	1

26 April 1994

Portugal	0–1	England
		Cassidy 15'

Frank Cooke Park, Dublin
Referee: Nikolai Levnikov (Russia)

26 April 1994

Czechoslovakia	1–0	Republic of Ireland

Tolka Park, Dublin
Referee: Amand Ancion (Belgium)

28 April 1994

Portugal	2–0	Czechoslovakia
Zeferino 20', 25'

Whitehall Stadium, Dublin
Referee: Sergey Shmolik (Belarus)

28 April 1994

England	1–1	Republic of Ireland

Tolka Park
Referee: Urs Meier (Switzerland)

30 April 1994

England	2–1	Czechoslovakia

Dalymount Park, Dublin
Referee: Manfred Schuttengruber (Austria)

30 April 1994

Republic of Ireland	0–3	Portugal
		Zeferino 35', 60'; Martinho 53'

Tolka Park, Dublin
Referee: Hermann Albrecht (Germany)

=== Group C ===
Team	Pld	W	D	L	GF	GA	GD	Pts
Russia	3	2	0	1	9	4	+5	6
Denmark	3	2	0	1	10	9	+1	6
Germany	3	2	0	1	9	6	+3	6
Switzerland	3	0	0	3	5	14	−9	0

26 April 1994

Germany	0–2	Russia

St. Colman's Park, Cobh
Referee: Juan Brito Arceo (Spain)

26 April 1994

Switzerland	3–4	Denmark
	(report)	Grønkjær, Laursen; Stefan Hansen

Turners Cross, Cork
Referee: Gylfi Thor Orrason (Iceland)

28 April 1994

Switzerland	1–5	Germany

Cooke Park, Tipperary
Referee: Vasyl Melnychuk (Ukraine)

28 April 1994

Denmark	3–2	Russia
Thorup; Olsen; Stefan Hansen	(report)

Plassey Bowl, Limerick
Referee: Dermot Gallagher (England)

30 April 1994

Russia	5–1	Switzerland

Turners Cross (stadium), Cork
Referee: Gylfi Thor Orrason (Iceland)

30 April 1994

Denmark	3–4	Germany
Thorup, Stefan Hansen	(report)

Bishopstown Stadium, Cork
Referee: Dermot Gallagher (England)

=== Group D ===
Team	Pld	W	D	L	GF	GA	GD	Pts
Turkey	3	2	1	0	7	2	+5	7
Ukraine	3	2	1	0	5	3	+2	7
Belgium	3	1	0	2	3	7	−4	3
Iceland	3	0	0	3	3	6	−3	0

26 April 1994

Turkey	2–1	Iceland
Meriç 52', 59'	(report)

Richmond Park, Dublin
Referee: Manfred Schuttengruber (Austria)

26 April 1994

Ukraine	2–1	Belgium
Iachtchouk 6'; Fedoruk 9'	Report (ukr)	Van De Paar 74' (pen.)

Belfield Park, Dublin
Referee: Vladimír Hriňák (Slovakia)

28 April 1994

Turkey	1–1	Ukraine
Kabakçı 17'	(report)	Zubov 20'

RDS Arena, Dublin
Referee: Knud Erik Fisker (Denmark)

28 April 1994

Iceland	1–2	Belgium

Richmond Park, Dublin
Referee: Bujar Pregja (Albania)

30 April 1994

Belgium	0–4	Turkey
	(report)	Dinç, Kabakçı; Tekke

RDS Arena, Dublin
Referee: Sergey Shmolik (Belarus)

30 April 1994

Iceland	1–2	Ukraine
Gíslason 17'	Report (ukr)	Iachtchouk 56'; Slyusar 68'

Belfield Park, Dublin
Referee: Richard O'Hanlon (Republic of Ireland)

== Knockout stage ==
=== Quarterfinals ===
3 May 1994

Belarus	1–3	Denmark
	(report)	Thorup; Grønkjær; Olsen

Dalymount Park, Dublin
Referee: Amand Ancion (Belgium)

3 May 1994

Russia	0–2	Austria

Tolka Park, Dublin
Referee: Juan Brito Arceo (Spain)

3 May 1994

England	2–2	Ukraine
Carragher 2'; Cassidy 56'	Report (ukr)	Fedoruk 49'; Omelianovitch 80'
Penalties
	6–7

RDS Arena, Dublin
Referee: José Pratas (Portugal)

3 May 1994

Turkey	0–0	Portugal
	(report)
Penalties
Çalişkan (penalty scored); Tan (penalty scored); Habiboğlu (penalty scored); Tekke (penalty scored); Bayhan (penalty scored)	5–3	(penalty scored) Edgar; (penalty scored) Pedro Monteiro; (penalty scored) Zeferino

Oriel Park, Dundalk
Referee: Urs Meier (Switzerland)

=== Semifinals ===
5 May 1994

Denmark	2–2	Ukraine
Thorup; Lektonen	(report)	Bilokon 42'; Hopkalo 61'
Penalties
	5–3

Dalymount Park, Dublin
Referee: Richard O'Hanlon (Republic of Ireland)

5 May 1994

Austria	0–1	Turkey
	(report)	Sağlam 16'

Tolka Park, Dublin
Referee: Dermot Gallagher (England)

=== Third Place Playoff ===
8 May 1994

Ukraine	2–0	Austria
Iachtchouk 21'; Zghura 72'	Report (ukr)

RDS Arena, Dublin
Referee: Nikolai Levnikov (Russia)

=== Final ===
8 May 1994

Denmark	0–1	Turkey
	(report TUR) (report DEN)	Meriç 52'

RDS Arena, Dublin
Referee: Hermann Albrecht (Germany)

== Sources ==
- RSSSF.com
- UEFA.com
