= Ján Mucha (footballer, born 1978) =

Slovak footballer

Personal information
- Full name: Ján Mucha
- Date of birth: 20 June 1978 (age 48)
- Place of birth: Bojnice, Czechoslovakia
- Height: 1.87 m (6 ft 1 1/2 in)
- Position: Goalkeeper

Team information
- Current team: Galanta
- Number: 1

Youth career
- Baník Prievidza

Senior career*
Years	Team	Apps	(Gls)
–	Prievidza	?	(?)
–	FK Partizánske	?	(?)
1995–2000	Nitra	50	(0)
2001–2005	Ružomberok	113	(0)
2005–2006	Viktoria Plzeň	9	(0)
2007–2008	Slovan Bratislava	21	(0)
2008–2009	Atromitos Yeroskipou	20	(0)
2010	Slovan Sabinov	?	(?)
2010–2011	Tatran Prešov	7	(0)
2011–2014	Baník Ružiná		
2014–	Slovan Galanta		

International career^{‡}
- Slovakia U15
- Slovakia U18
- Slovakia U21
- * Club domestic league appearances and goals as of 23 August 2014 ‡ National team caps and goals as of 28 August 2010

Ján Mucha (born 20 June 1978) is a Slovak football goalkeeper who currently plays for 4. liga club FC Slovan Galanta.

== Career ==
Mucha spent four seasons with FC Nitra, appearing in 50 league matches.
