= Alfredo Juarez Zeferino =

Mexican union activist (born 2000)

Alfredo Juarez Zeferino (known as Lelo; born 2000) is a farmworker, community organizer, and immigrant to the United States. He helped found Familias Unidas por la Justicia and pass heat exposure regulation in Washington. In March 2025, he was arrested by Immigration and Customs Enforcement (ICE).

== Early life ==
Lelo was born in a small town in the mountains of Guerrero, Mexico in 2000 and immigrated to the state of Washington as a child. He became a berry picker at Sakuma Brothers Farms. At age 13, he helped found a local farmworkers' union called Familias Unidas por la Justicia. The union is led by Edgar Franks and Jose Ramirez.

At age 15, he was arrested for driving the wrong way on a one-way street. He did not have a license and lied to police about his age. He was taken to the ICE detention center in Tacoma, Washington and then released on account of his age. Lelo filed racial profiling complaints about the local police department after the incident. The city settled the case for $100,000. Despite this incident, he does not have a criminal record.

== Activism ==
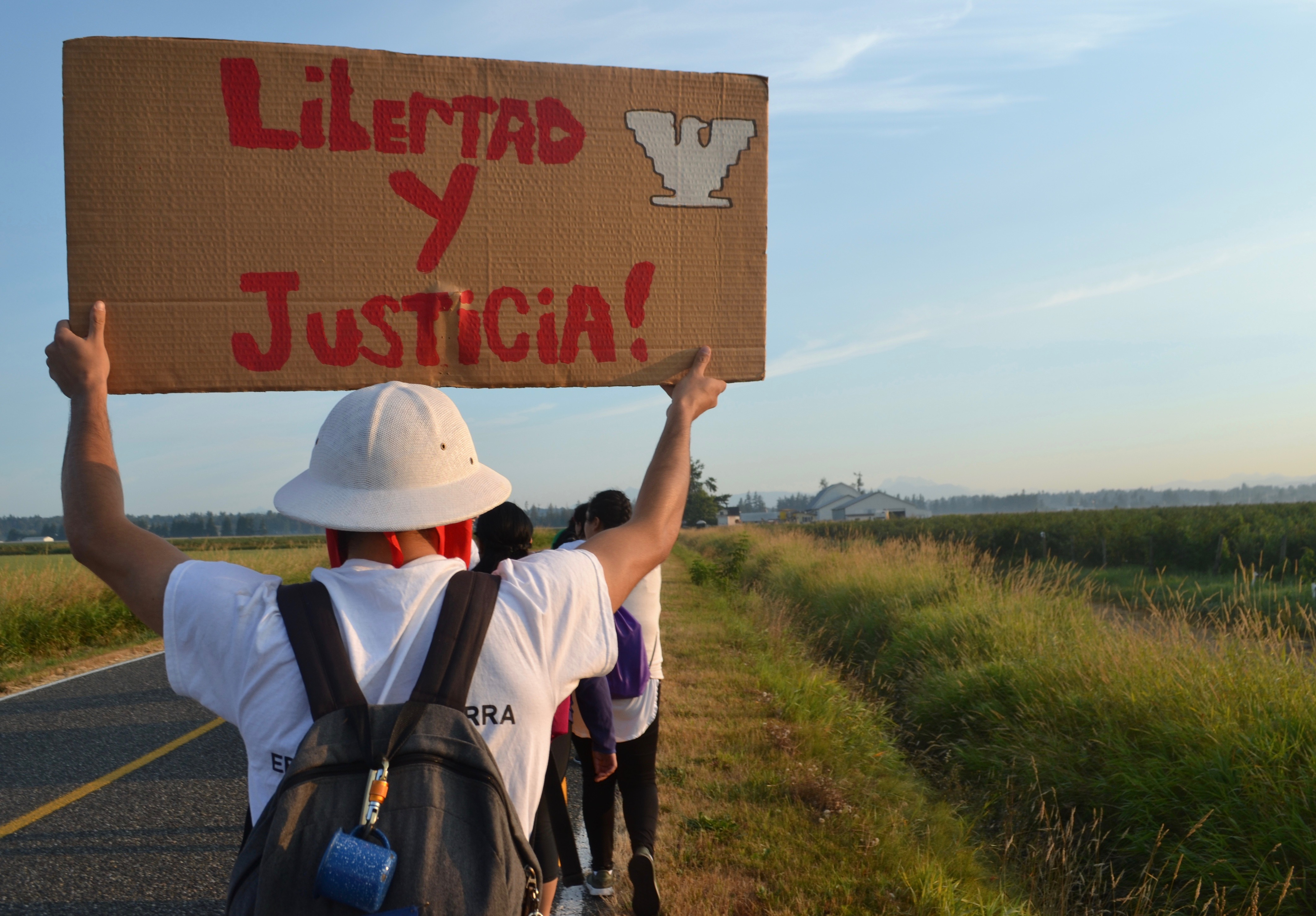
Familias Unidas por la Justicia march

Lelo is an organizing member of Community to Community Development, a farmworkers' advocacy group. Franks credits Lelo with helping to pass the 2021 state standards around heat exposure for farmworkers. Other farmworkers say Lelo helped them talk to lawmakers and strike. He was on a local Immigration Advisory Board until it dissolved. At the time of his arrest he worked on a tulip bulb farm. He said he also organized support for Washington's rent cap law which passed while he was detained.

== Arrest by ICE ==
Lelo applied for DACA in 2015. Courts ordered he be deported in 2018, but he was not arrested by ICE until March 25, 2025. Lelo claims to have been unaware of the deportation order. In April 2025, his case was reopened by his legal counsel as they sought to remove the deportation order. Members of Community to Community Development have called his arrest politically motivated. However the Department of Homeland Security (DHS) denied political motivation and said he was "illegal alien from Mexico with a final order of removal from a judge". DHS incorrectly stated his name as "Juan Juarez-Ceferino". His arrest led to protests by about 200 local union members outside the ICE detention center where he was being held. Protesters also highlighted ICE's detention of Lewelyn Dixon, a local green card-holding lab technician. U.S. Senator Patty Murray highlighted the importance of Lelo's and Dixon's cases. After the protest, Lelo was moved to the ICE detention facility in Tacoma, Washington. In response to the arrest, U.S. Rep. Rick Larsen stated,

In arrests across the country, the Trump Administration and ICE have claimed that they are going after “the worst of the worst” — but there is no indication that Alfredo Juarez Zeferino and the other people detained today represent the worst of the worst. Immigrating to the United States is legal. Union organizing is legal.

Larsen followed up with a face to face meeting with Lelo on June 20. Larsen stated that the Northwest Immigrations and Customs Enforcement Processing Center in Tacoma was holding 1,500 persons at the time. The facility was facing serious staffing challenges because it had half as many prisoners at the start of the year.

Kim Lund, mayor of Bellingham, Washington, stated,

Lelo is a leader in our area whose activism has helped shine a vital spotlight on immigrant and farmworker needs and rights. His voice represents the thousands of people who work in our region providing essential services that sustain us all. He was a valuable contributor to City advisory group activities, in support of our shared goal of maintaining and protecting the rights and dignity of all residents.

In a May 2025 hearing, a judge determined that they do not have jurisdiction to release him on bond. The bond hearing drew attendance from 60 supporters.

After his three and half month imprisonment in a GEO Group detention center, Lelo said he organized a hunger protest in response to being served unsafe chicken. He further said there were only six opportunities to go outside during his confinement.

Lelo decided to voluntary leave the United States, and his request was granted on July 14, 2025. He moved to Santa Cruz, Yucucani, Guerrero, Mexico. He said his motivation was based on the difficult process of fighting an immigration case in the United States.
