= Serhiy Zghura =

Ukrainian footballer and coach

Serhiy Zgura
Personal information
- Full name: Serhiy Oleksandrovych Zghura
- Date of birth: 3 November 1977 (age 48)
- Place of birth: Odesa, Ukrainian SSR, USSR
- Height: 1.84 m (6 ft 0 in)
- Position: Forward

Senior career*
Years	Team	Apps	(Gls)
1993–1995	Chornomorets-2 Odesa	45	(3)
1995–1996	Naftokhimik Kremenchuk	12	(0)
1996–1997	Desna Chernihiv	13	(0)
1997–2000	Zimbru Chișinău	39	(1)
2000–2001	Metalurh Donetsk	8	(1)
2000–2001	Chornomorets Odesa	14	(0)
2001–2003	Metalurh Donetsk	28	(0)
2001–2003	→ Metalurh-2 Donetsk	31	(7)
2003–2004	Chornomorets Odesa	8	(0)
2003–2004	Zorya Luhansk	13	(1)
2004–2005	Chornomorets Odesa	24	(0)
2005–2006	Kryvbas Kryvyi Rih	10	(0)
2005–2006	Chornomorets Odesa	9	(0)
2006–2007	Kryvbas Kryvyi Rih	1	(0)
2007–2009	Vostok	51	(8)

International career
1993–1994	Ukraine U16		
Medal record
Men's football
Representing Ukraine
UEFA European Under-16 Championship
Third place	1994 Republic of Ireland
- * Club domestic league appearances and goals as of 27 January 2022

Serhiy Oleksandrovych Zghura (Ukrainian: Сергій Олександрович Згура) is a Ukrainian retired footballer who played as a midfielder.

== Career ==
In 1993 he began his career with Chornomorets-2 Odesa. In 1995 he moved to Naftokhimik Kremenchuk before switching quickly betweenDesna Chernihiv and Zimbru Chișinău, where he won the Moldovan National Division in 1997–98, 1998–99 and 1999–2000. In summer 2000 he joined to Chornomorets Odesa for half a season before moving to Metalurh Donetsk. In 2004 he returned to Chornomorets Odesa.

== Honours ==
Zimbru Chișinău

- Moldovan National Division: (3) 1997–98, 1998–99, 1999–2000
- Moldovan Cup: 1997–98

Desna Chernihiv

- Ukrainian Second League: 1996–97
