= Rosa 'Zephirine Drouhin' =

Cherry-Pink Bourbon rose cultivar

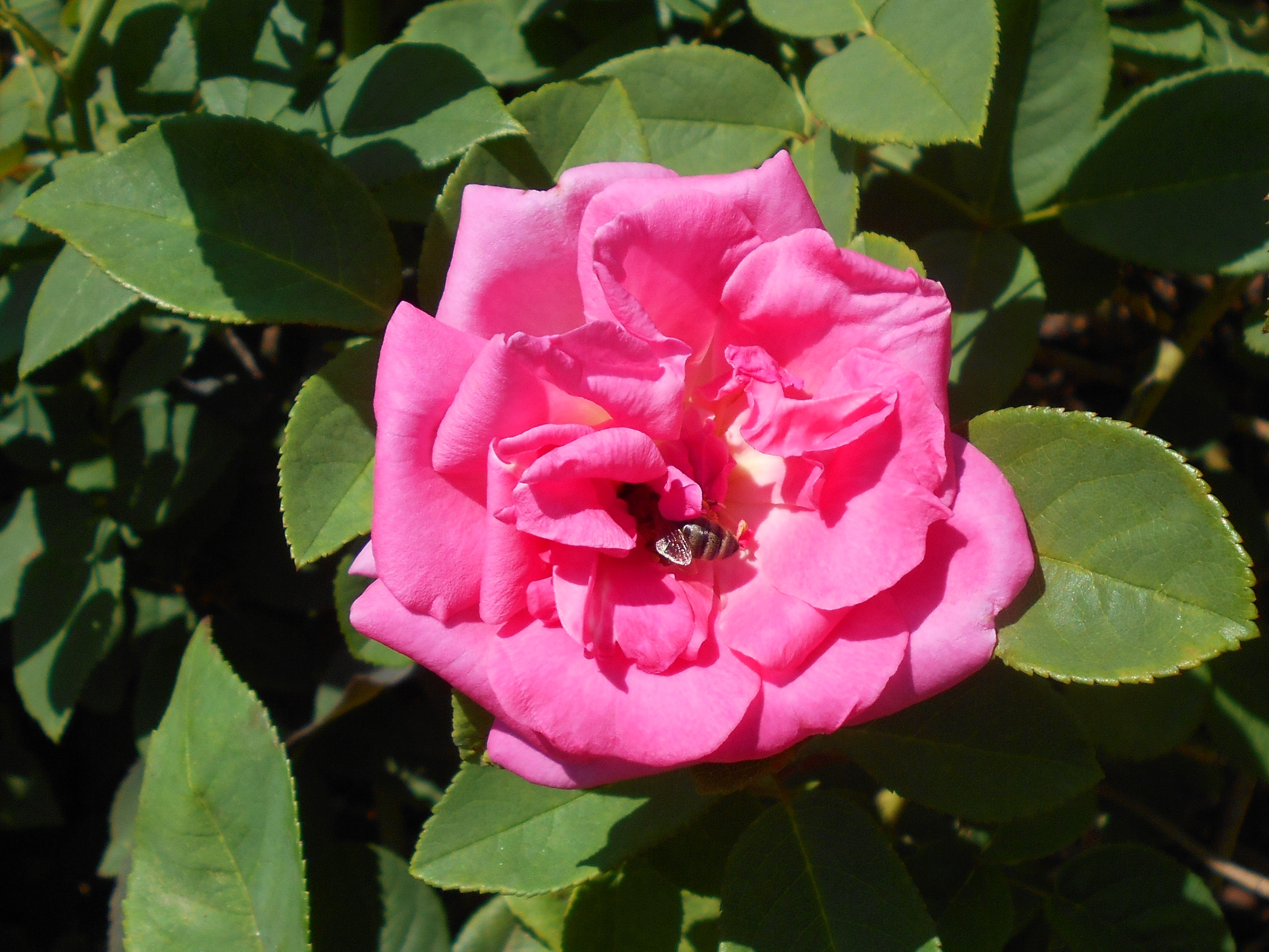
- Genus: Rosa hybrid
- Hybrid parentage: unknown
- Cultivar group: Bourbon rose
- Cultivar: 'Zephirine Drouhin' or 'Zéphirine Drouhin'
- Marketing names: 'Belle Dijonaise' 'Mme Charles Bonnet' 'Mme Gustave' 'Ingenoli Predilatta'
- Breeder: Bizot
- Origin: France, 1868

Rosa 'Zephirine Drouhin' (or 'Zéphirine Drouhin') is a cherry-pink Bourbon rose, famous for being completely thornless. It was developed by French rose breeder Bizot in 1868. Its origin is unknown, although believed to be the outcome of a cross between a Boursault rose and a Hybrid Perpetual rose. The new rose cultivar was first introduced in Switzerland by the horticulturalist Charles Bonnet, who sold it under his own name in 1868. It was later introduced in Australia by Hazlewood Bros. Pty. Ltd. in before 1921 as 'Zéphirine Drouhin'.

== Description ==
'Zephirine Drouhin' is a tall, climbing Bourbon rose, 10 to 15 ft (3.0–4.6 m) in height, with a 5 to 8 ft (1.5–2.4 m) spread. It has a semi-double (17–25 petals) bloom form, and is carried singly or in small clusters on short stems. Bloom size is 4 to 5 in (100 to 130 mm). Flower colour ranges from cherry-pink to a deep-rose pink. 'Zephirine Drouhin' is known for being one of the first and last roses to bloom, flowering abundantly and continually from June to the autumn. Flowers are very fragrant with a strong damask scent.. It can be grown as a shrub, climber or pillar rose. 'Zephirine Drouhin' is known for being completely thornless. The plant is prone to blackspot, mildew and rust.

== History ==
'Zephirine Drouhin' was developed by a French rose breeder named Bizot in 1868. It is thought to be the result of a cross between a Boursault rose and a Hybrid Perpetual rose. The rose was most likely named after the wife of a rose enthusiast from Semur-en-Auxois (Côte-d'Or). The new rose cultivar was first introduced in Switzerland by the horticulturalist Charles Bonnet, who sold it under his own name in 1868. It was later introduced in Australia by Hazlewood Bros. Pty. Ltd. in before 1921 as 'Zéphirine Drouhin'. The rose has produced three child plants: 'Emily Rhodes', (Clark),1937), 'Kathleen Harrop' (sport, Dickson II, 1919) and 'Marthe' (sport, Knudsen, before 1912)

== Gallery ==
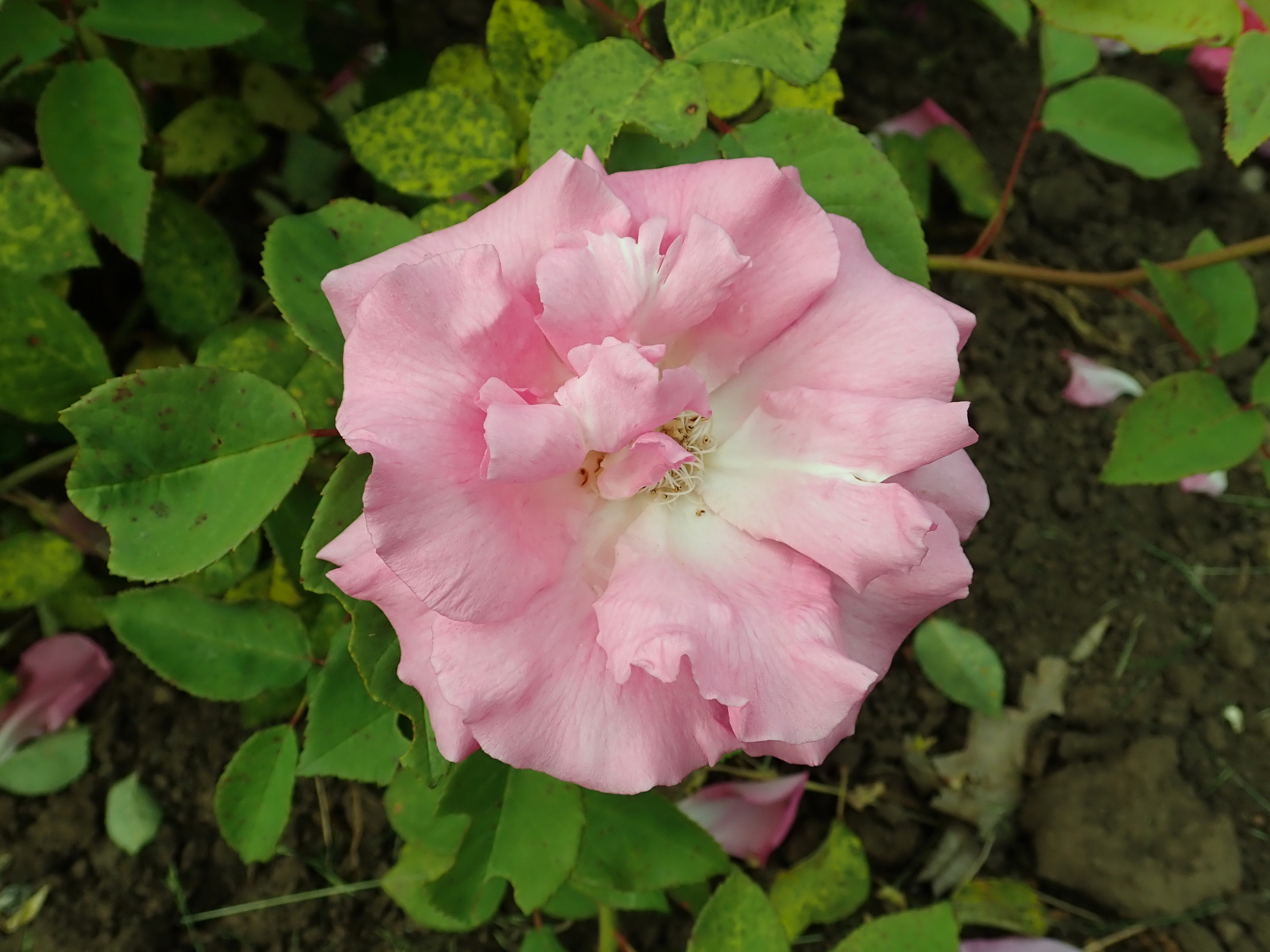
'Zephirine Drouhin', 1868

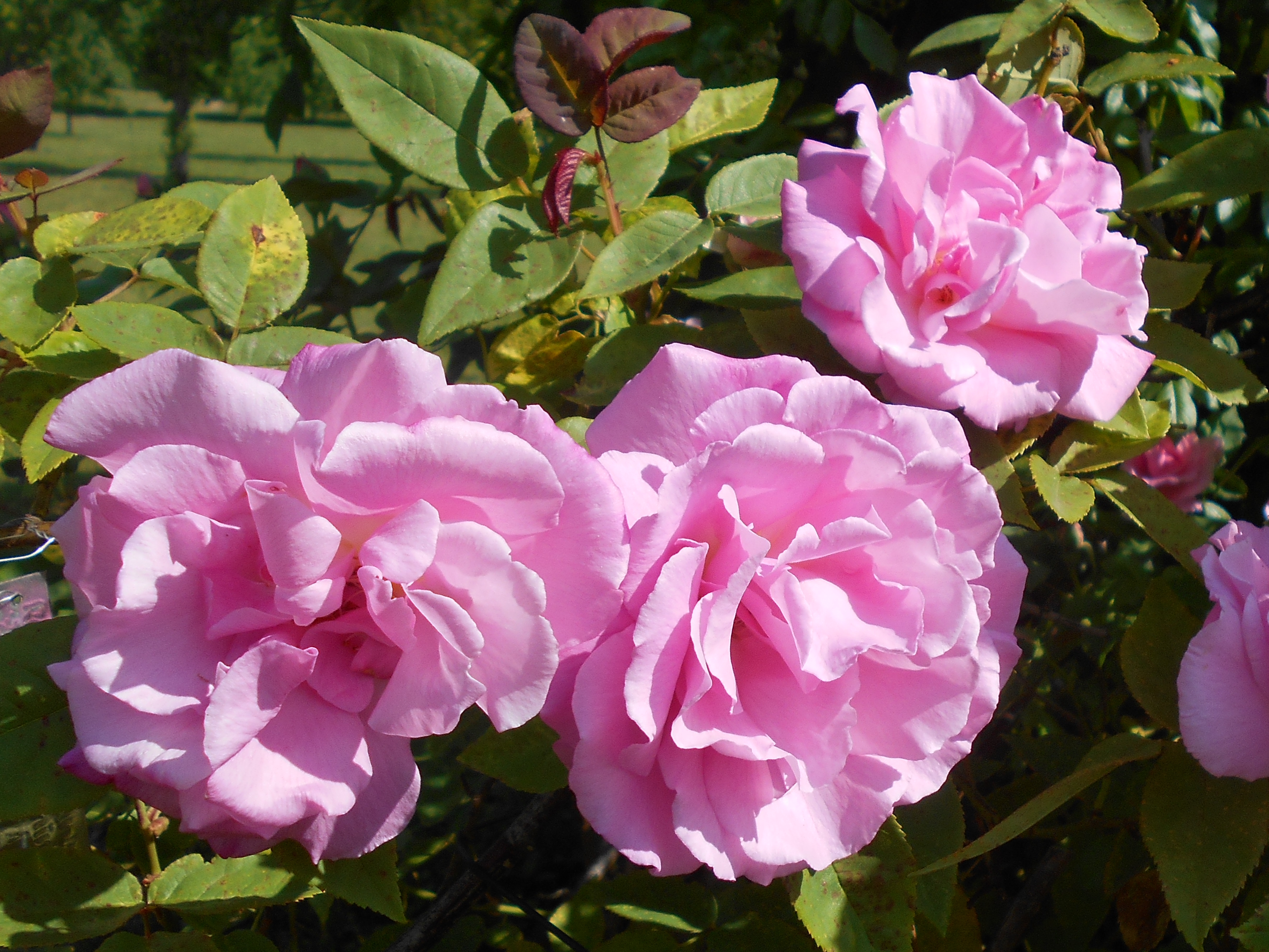
'Zephirine Drouhin', 1868

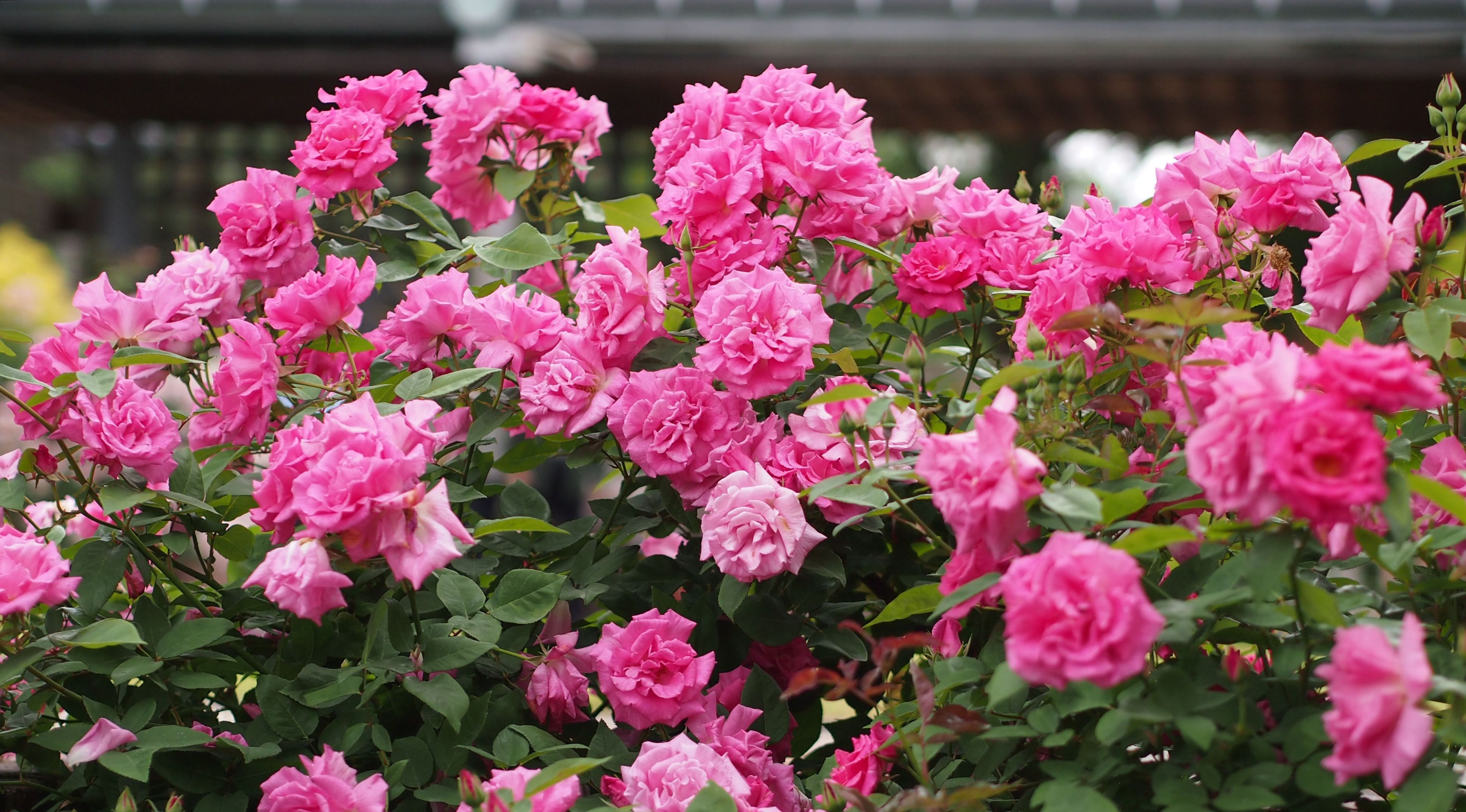
'Zephirine Drouhin', 1868

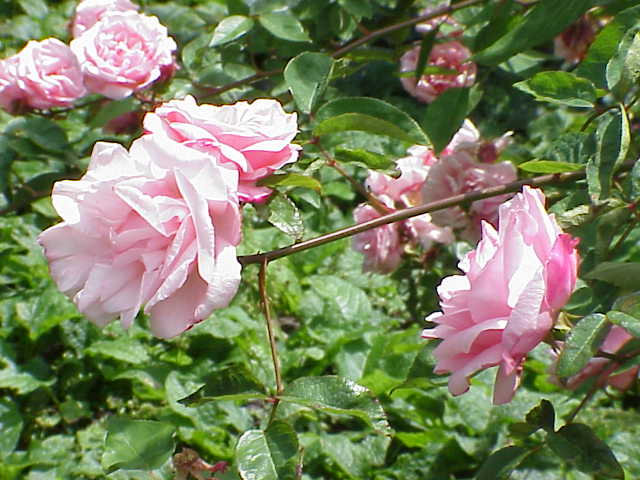
'Martha', 1911

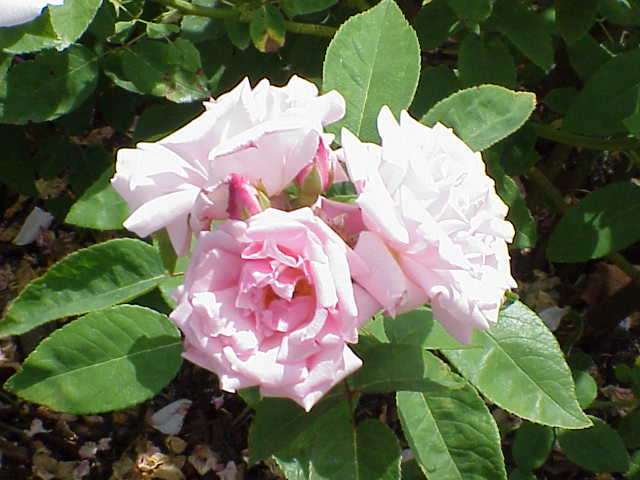
'Kathleen Harrop', 1919

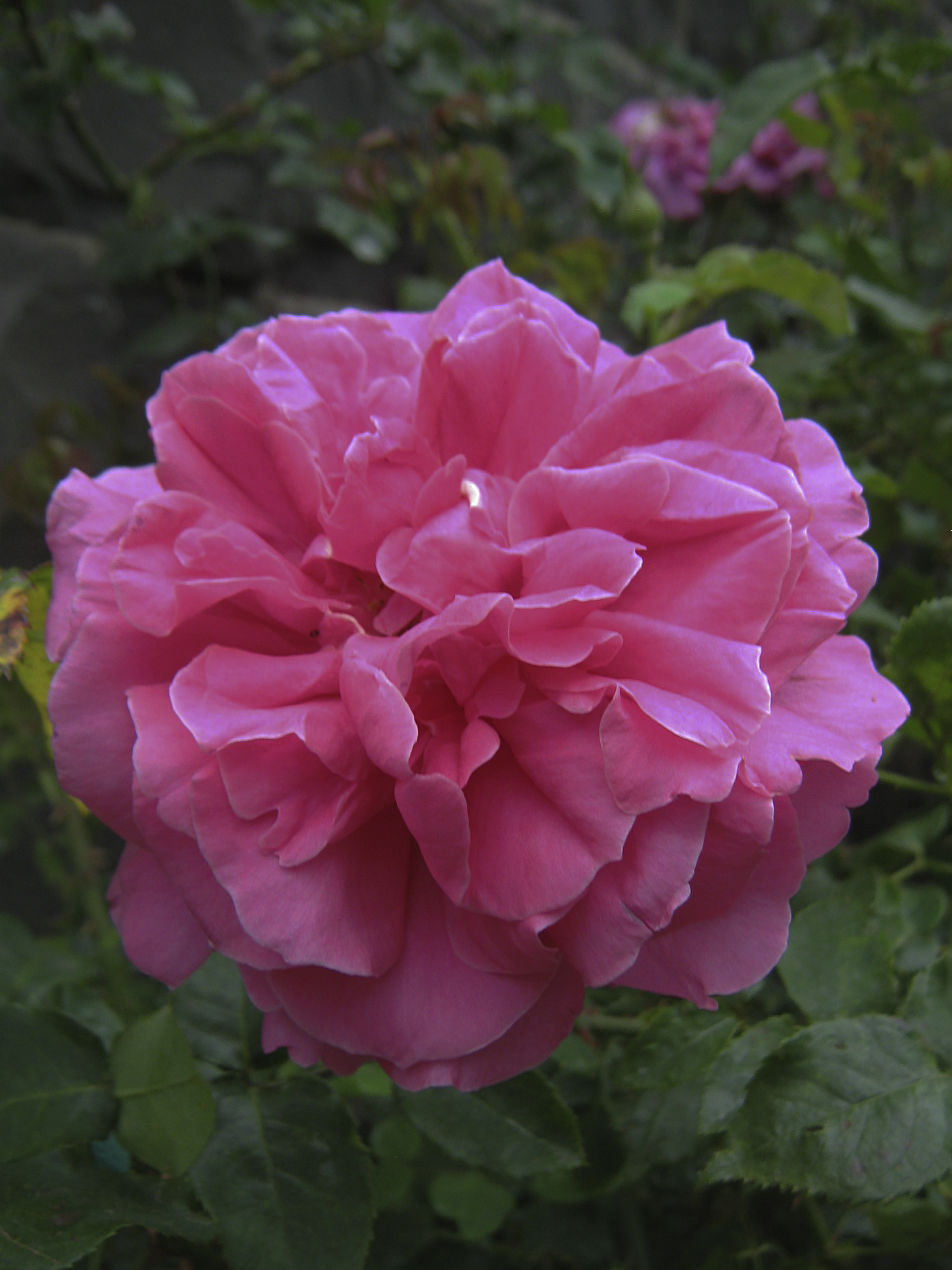
'Emily Rhodes', 1937
