= Dmytro Nazarov =

Ukrainian-Russian footballer

Personal information
- Full name: Dmytro Arkadiyovych Nazarov
- Date of birth: 3 August 1977 (age 49)
- Place of birth: Feodosia, Crimean Oblast, Ukrainian SSR, Soviet Union
- Height: 1.83 m (6 ft 0 in)
- Position: Defender

Youth career
- SC Tavriya Simferopol

Senior career*
Years	Team	Apps	(Gls)
1994–2002	Tavriya Simferopol	119	(0)
1996–1997	→ Dynamo Saky (loan)	7	(0)
2002–2003	PFC Sevastopol	20	(3)
2004–2005	Illichivets Mariupol	2	(0)
2004–2005	→ Illichivets-2 Mariupol	10	(2)
2005	Dynamo-IhroService Simferopol	15	(1)
2007	PFC Sevastopol	7	(0)
2008	Tavriya Simferopol	21	(1)
2009	PFC Sevastopol	11	(0)
2015	TSK Simferopol		
Medal record
Men's football
Representing Ukraine
UEFA European Under-16 Championship
Third place	1994 Republic of Ireland
- * Club domestic league appearances and goals

Dmytro Arkadiyovych Nazarov (Ukrainian: Дмитро Аркадійович Назаров; born 3 August 1977) is a former Ukrainian-Russian football defender. He was in Tavriya from 1994 to 2002, and also played for Metalurh Mariupol, Ihroservice Simferopol, and PFC Sevastopol. Nazorov also played for the Ukrainian U-16 team in 1993.

In 2014, after the annexation of Feodosia, Crimea to Russia, he received a Russian citizenship as Dmitriy Arkadyevich Nazarov (Russian: Дмитрий Аркадьевич Назаров).
