= Martin Jensen (footballer) =

Danish footballer (born 1978)

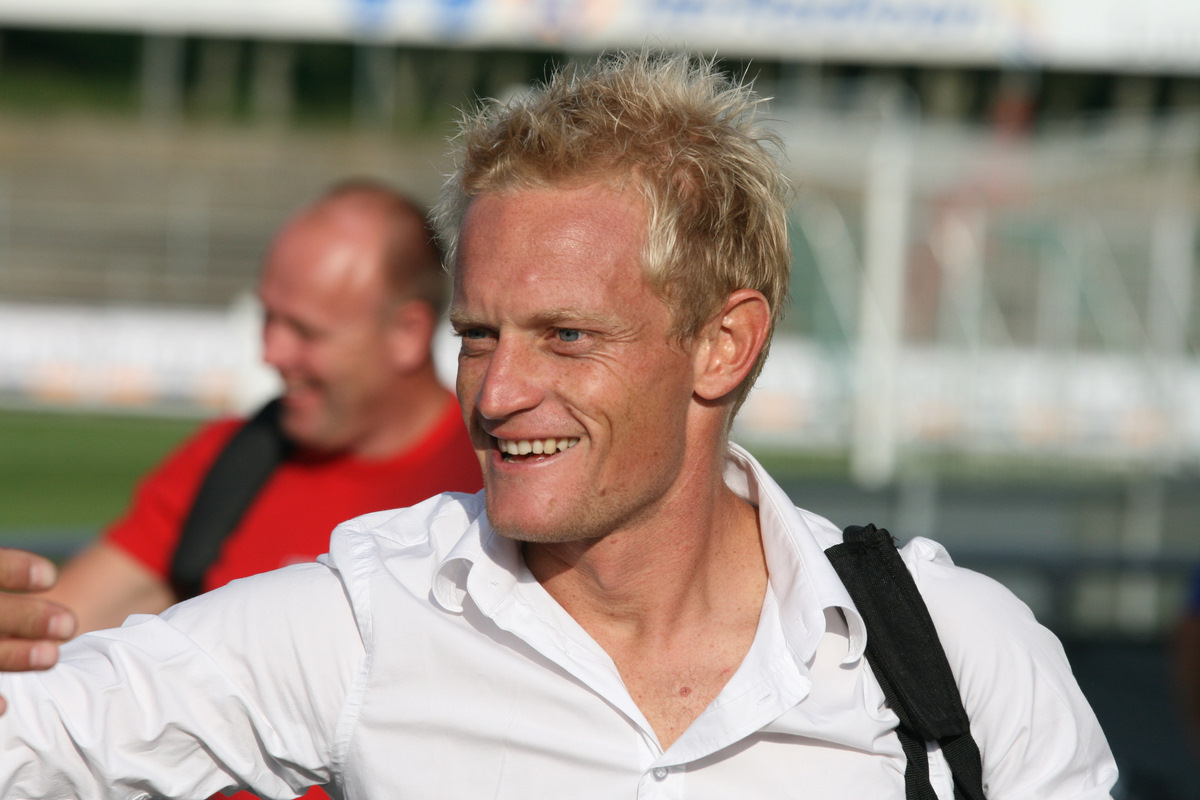

Personal information
- Date of birth: 27 July 1978 (age 48)
- Place of birth: Esbjerg, Denmark
- Height: 1.77 m (5 ft 9 1/2 in)
- Position: Defender

Team information
- Current team: Sandefjord (development manager)

Senior career*
Years	Team	Apps	(Gls)
1996–2007	Esbjerg fB	228	(0)
2007–2011	Sandefjord	118	(3)
2012	Fram Larvik	25	(1)

International career
1999	Denmark U21	3	(1)
- * Club domestic league appearances and goals

Martin Ruby Krucov Jensen (born 27 July 1978) is a Danish retired football defender.

== Career ==
He was born in Esbjerg and started his career with Esbjerg fB, playing a total 268 games for the club before he joined Sandefjord Fotball in 2007. After five season and 135 matches for Sandefjord, he was awarded the title SF-ambassadør (Ambassador of Sandefjord Fotball) ahead of his last match for Sandefjord, being the first to receiving the award. Ahead of the 2012-season he joined the Norwegian Second Division club Fram Larvik, as an assistant player coach.

He has played three games for the Denmark national under-21 football team.
