= Oleh Fedoruk =

Soviet footballer and Ukrainian coach

Personal information
- Full name: Oleh Yevheniyovych Fedoruk
- Date of birth: 27 October 1977 (age 49)
- Place of birth: Ukrainian SSR, USSR
- Height: 1.82 m (6 ft 0 in)
- Position: Midfielder

Senior career*
Years	Team	Apps	(Gls)
1994	Khimik Vinnytsia	1	(0)
1994	Nyva Vinnytsia	1	(0)
1995	Dynamo-2 Kyiv	17	(0)
1997–1998	Fortuna Sharhorod	15	(0)
1998–2000	Ibar Rožaje		
2001	Vinnytsia	0	(0)
2002	Desna Chernihiv	7	(0)
2002	Elektrometalurh-NZF Nikopol	6	(1)
2003	Naftovyk Dolyna	3	(0)
2003	Helios Kharkiv	7	(0)
Medal record
Men's football
Representing Ukraine
UEFA European Under-16 Championship
Third place	1994 Republic of Ireland
- * Club domestic league appearances and goals

Oleh Yevheniyovych Fedoruk (Ukrainian: Олег Євгенійович Федорук; born 27 October 1977) is a Ukrainian retired professional footballer.

== Career ==
Oleh Fedoruk is a pupil of the Kyiv Republican Higher School of Physical Education. He started his career in the Kyiv "Olympic" in the amateur championship of Ukraine. In 1994, he played for the Vinnitsa clubs "Chemist" and "Niva", in the latter he played the only match in the Higher League of Ukraine 1994/1995 against Odesa "Chornomorets" on September 10, 1994 (defeat 1: 2).

In 1994, as part of the Ukraine national team from players under 16 years old, he became the bronze medalist of the European Championship in Northern Ireland. He was noted by the fact that in training before the match against Turkey, he argued with goalkeeper Sergei Perkhun that he could score five out of five penalties. After four strikes Fedoruk Perkhun parried two, Fedoruk scored twice more. Fedoruk's fifth blow turned out to be so powerful that Perkhun broke his arm, with which he still managed to reflect the blow: because of this, Perkhun went through the entire tournament in a cast.

Fedoruk was considered the most talented defender from the team that took bronze medals in Northern Ireland: according to Gennady Zubov, he played standard positions perfectly. After the European Championship, the players of the national team were promised to be awarded the title of masters of sports, but this was never done.

In 1995, Fedoruk was invited to Dynamo-2 Kyiv, but he never played for the main team, playing only for understudies. In 1997 he became a player in Fortuna Sharhorod, and later played in amateur clubs in Germany and Yugoslavia. In 2001 he returned to Nyva Vinnytsia, but did not play a match for it; in the same year he became a player in Desna Chernihiv. Later he played for Elektrometalurh-NZF, "Oilman" (Valley) and Helios Kharkiv. He finished his amateur career in Polesie from Dobryanka and in Nizhyn.
