= Serdar Meriç =

Turkish footballer

Personal information
- Date of birth: 10 October 1977 (age 48)
- Place of birth: İzmir, Turkey
- Position: Forward

Senior career*
Years	Team	Apps	(Gls)
1994–1999	Altay		
1999–2000	Konyaspor		
2000	→ Bucaspor (loan)		
2000–2003	Aydinspor		
2002	→ Refahiyespor (loan)		
2004–2005	Bucaspor		
2005–2006	Muğlaspor		
2007–2008	Refahiyespor		
2007	→ İzmirspor (loan)		
- * Club domestic league appearances and goals

Serdar Meriç (born 10 October 1977) is a Turkish retired football striker.
