= Serhiy Omelyanovych =

Ukrainian footballer (1977–2015)

Personal information
- Full name: Serhiy Omelyanovych
- Date of birth: 13 August 1977
- Place of birth: Kadiivka, Soviet Union
- Date of death: 21 July 2015 (aged 37)
- Place of death: Lobbes, Belgium
- Height: 1.76 m (5 ft 9 in)
- Position: Midfielder

Youth career
- Shakhtar Donetsk
- Zorya Luhansk

Senior career*
Years	Team	Apps	(Gls)
1994	Zorya-MALS Luhansk	5	(0)
1994–2001	Charleroi	83	(1)
2001–2002	Westerlo	13	(0)
2002–2005	Verbroedering Geel	46	(10)
2005	Allianssi	8	(2)
2006	Tubize	8	(1)
2006	Ethnikos Asteras	0	(0)
2006	Ronse	3	(0)
2007–2008	R.F.C. de Liège	?	(?)
2008–2009	Wallonia Walhain	?	(?)
2009–2010	FCLL	?	(?)

International career
1994	Ukraine U16	7	(1)
1998	Ukraine U21	1	(0)
Medal record
Men's football
Representing Ukraine
UEFA European Under-16 Championship
Third place	1994 Republic of Ireland
- * Club domestic league appearances and goals as of 26 October 2010 (UTC)

Serhiy Leonidovych Omelyanovych (Ukrainian: Сергій Леонідович Омельянович; 13 August 1977 – 21 July 2015) was a Ukrainian professional footballer. He last played as a midfielder for FCLL and held Belgian citizenship. His last name is sometimes transliterated as Omelianovitch. Omelyanovych was found dead on 21 July 2015 at his home. The cause of death was alcohol intoxication.

== Club career ==
He made his professional debut in the Ukrainian Premier League in the 1993–94 season for Zorya Luhansk.

Omelyanovych's talent caught the eye of Charleroi and he signed for the Belgian club in the summer of 1994. Sergei spent 7 years with the team. In the 2002/03 season he played for Westerlo and next three seasons for Verbroedering Geel. Omelianovitch signed for AC Allianssi in Finland for the 2005 season. In 2006, he returned to Belgium, signing a half-year contract with Tubize. In July 2006 he played for Ethnikos Asteras in Greece, just month after he left the club. He has also played for Ronse, R.F.C. de Liège and Wallonia Walhain. In September 2009 he signed for FCLL.

== International career ==
Omelyanovych played for the Ukraine's youth national under-16 teams and Under-21. In 1994, he appeared at the European Under-16 Championship in Ireland, where Ukraine finished third.
