= Jamie Cassidy =

English footballer

Personal information
- Date of birth: 21 November 1977 (age 48)
- Place of birth: Liverpool, England
- Position: Midfielder

Youth career
- Liverpool

Senior career*
Years	Team	Apps	(Gls)
1996–1999	Liverpool	0	(0)
1999–2000	Cambridge United	8	(0)
2000	Cambridge City		
2000–2001	Northwich Victoria		
2001–201x	Burscough		
- * Club domestic league appearances and goals

Jamie Cassidy (born 21 November 1977 in Liverpool) is an English former footballer who played as a midfielder in the Football League for Cambridge United. He began his career with Liverpool. While at Anfield, he won the FA Youth Cup in 1996, and earned a professional contract, but was released in 1999 without playing a first-team game. He then spent one year at Cambridge United, playing 10 matches in all competitions, before moving into non-league football with Cambridge City, Northwich Victoria and Burscough.

Jamie Carragher recalled in his 2008 autobiography Carra that Cassidy would have been "a certain Liverpool regular", if his development had not been derailed by a damaged cruciate ligament then a broken leg.

In March 2024, he was sentenced to 13 years and 3 months in prison for his involvement in an international drug supply and money laundering operation.
