= 2016 UEFA European Under-17 Championship qualification =

Tournament details
- Dates: Qualifying round: 22 September – 31 October 2015; Elite round: 11 March – 3 April 2016
- Teams: 53 (from 1 confederation)

Tournament statistics
- Matches played: 126
- Goals scored: 343 (2.72 per match)
- Top scorer: (Portugal) João Filipe (7 goals)

The 2016 UEFA European Under-17 Championship qualification was a men's under-17 football competition organised by UEFA to determine the 15 national teams joining the automatically qualified hosts Azerbaijan in the 2016 UEFA European Under-17 Championship final tournament.

A total of 53 national teams entered this qualifying competition, which was played in two rounds between September 2015 and April 2016. Players born on or after 1 January 1999 were eligible to participate. Each match had a duration of 80 minutes, consisting of two halves of 40 minutes with a 15-minute half-time.

== Format ==
The qualifying competition consisted of two rounds:

- Qualifying round: Apart from Germany, which received a bye to the elite round as the team with the highest seeding coefficient, the remaining 52 teams were drawn into 13 groups of four teams. Each group was played in single round-robin format at one of the teams selected as hosts after the draw. The 13 group winners, the 13 runners-up, and the five third-placed teams with the best record against the first and second-placed teams in their group advanced to the elite round.
- Elite round: The 32 teams were drawn into eight groups of four teams. Each group was played in single round-robin format at one of the teams selected as hosts after the draw. The eight group winners and the seven runners-up with the best record against the first and third-placed teams in their group qualified for the final tournament.

=== Tiebreakers ===
The teams were ranked according to points (3 points for a win, 1 point for a draw, 0 points for a loss). If two or more teams were equal on points on completion of a mini-tournament, the following tie-breaking criteria were applied, in the order given, to determine the rankings:

1. Higher number of points obtained in the mini-tournament matches played among the teams in question;
2. Superior goal difference resulting from the mini-tournament matches played among the teams in question;
3. Higher number of goals scored in the mini-tournament matches played among the teams in question;
4. If, after having applied criteria 1 to 3, teams still had an equal ranking, criteria 1 to 3 were reapplied exclusively to the mini-tournament matches between the teams in question to determine their final rankings. If this procedure did not lead to a decision, criteria 5 to 9 applied;
5. Superior goal difference in all mini-tournament matches;
6. Higher number of goals scored in all mini-tournament matches;
7. If only two teams had the same number of points, and they were tied according to criteria 1 to 6 after having met in the last round of the mini-tournament, their rankings were determined by a penalty shoot-out (not used if more than two teams had the same number of points, or if their rankings were not relevant for qualification for the next stage).
8. Lower disciplinary points total based only on yellow and red cards received in the mini-tournament matches (red card = 3 points, yellow card = 1 point, expulsion for two yellow cards in one match = 3 points);
9. Drawing of lots.

To determine the five best third-placed teams from the qualifying round and the seven best runners-up from the elite round, the results against the teams in fourth place were discarded. The following criteria were applied:

1. Higher number of points;
2. Superior goal difference;
3. Higher number of goals scored;
4. Lower disciplinary points total based only on yellow and red cards received (red card = 3 points, yellow card = 1 point, expulsion for two yellow cards in one match = 3 points);
5. Drawing of lots.

== Qualifying round ==
=== Draw ===
The draw for the qualifying round was held on 3 December 2014, 09:00 CET (UTC+1), at the UEFA headquarters in Nyon, Switzerland.

The teams were seeded according to their coefficient ranking, calculated based on the following:

- 2012 UEFA European Under-17 Championship final tournament and qualifying competition (qualifying round and elite round)
- 2013 UEFA European Under-17 Championship final tournament and qualifying competition (qualifying round and elite round)
- 2014 UEFA European Under-17 Championship final tournament and qualifying competition (qualifying round and elite round)

Each group contained two teams from Pot A and two teams from Pot B. For political reasons, Spain and Gibraltar (due to the disputed status of Gibraltar), as well as Russia and Ukraine (due to the Russian military intervention in Ukraine), could not be drawn in the same group.

Bye to elite round
Team	Coeff	Rank
Germany	11.333	1

Pot A
Team	Coeff	Rank
England	10.000	2
Netherlands	10.000	3
Portugal	9.167	4
Poland	9.167	5
France	8.833	6
Serbia	8.667	7
Russia	8.000	8
Switzerland	7.833	9
Italy	7.833	10
Spain	7.500	11
Czech Republic	7.500	12
Scotland	7.333	13
Georgia	7.000	14
Sweden	7.000	15
Hungary	6.667	16
Ukraine	6.500	17
Belgium	6.500	18
Iceland	6.000	19
Austria	5.833	20
Turkey	5.667	21
Croatia	5.667	22
Denmark	5.500	23
Republic of Ireland	5.167	24
Norway	4.833	25
Belarus	4.633	26
Bosnia and Herzegovina	4.167	27

Pot B
Team	Coeff	Rank
Greece	4.167	28
Bulgaria	4.000	29
Israel	4.000	30
Slovakia	4.000	31
Albania	3.833	32
Slovenia	3.667	33
Northern Ireland	3.500	34
Romania	2.833	35
Latvia	2.667	36
Macedonia	2.667	37
Estonia	2.500	38
Finland	2.333	39
Wales	2.000	40
Lithuania	2.000	41
Armenia	2.000	42
Luxembourg	1.667	43
Cyprus	1.667	44
Faroe Islands	1.667	45
Moldova	1.333	46
Montenegro	1.333	47
Kazakhstan	1.333	48
Malta	0.333	49
Andorra	0.333	50
San Marino	0.333	51
Liechtenstein	0.000	52
Gibraltar	0.000	53

Notes

- Azerbaijan (Coeff: 1.667) qualified automatically for the final tournament as hosts.

=== Groups ===
Times up to 24 October 2015 were CEST (UTC+2), thereafter times were CET (UTC+1).

==== Group 1 ====
Pos	Team	Pld	W	D	L	GF	GA	GD	Pts	Qualification
1	Netherlands	3	2	0	1	10	3	+7	6 (Note: Ranked by head-to-head record (Netherlands: 3 pts; Switzerland: 0 pts).)	Elite round
2	Switzerland	3	2	0	1	4	4	0	6	Elite round
3	Wales (H)	3	1	1	1	3	3	0	4	Elite round
4	Albania	3	0	1	2	1	8	−7	1	

Source: UEFA
Rules for classification: Qualification tiebreakers
(H) Hosts
Notes:
22 October 2015
13:00

Netherlands	1–2	Wales
Nunnely 40+1'	Report	Cooper 4', 71'

Dragon Park, Newport
Referee: Alexandr Aliyev (Kazakhstan)
22 October 2015
17:00

Switzerland	2–0	Albania
Zeqiri 9'; Kameraj 25'	Report

Newport Stadium, Newport
Referee: Tiago Martins (Portugal)

24 October 2015
13:00

Albania	0–5	Netherlands
	Report	Adekanye 4'; Lopez 10', 40'; Vente 79'; Kumbulla 80+2' (o.g.)

Newport Stadium, Newport
Referee: Alexandr Aliyev (Kazakhstan)
24 October 2015
17:00

Switzerland	1–0	Wales
Zeqiri 57'	Report

Dragon Park, Newport
Referee: Thoroddur Hjaltalin (Iceland)

27 October 2015
13:00

Netherlands	4–1	Switzerland
Vente 44', 54', 76'; Obispo 64'	Report	Hajrizi 80+3'

Newport Stadium, Newport
Referee: Tiago Martins (Portugal)
27 October 2015
13:00

Wales	1–1	Albania
Evans 42'	Report	Kastrati 39'

Dragon Park, Newport
Referee: Thoroddur Hjaltalin (Iceland)

==== Group 2 ====
Pos	Team	Pld	W	D	L	GF	GA	GD	Pts	Qualification
1	Russia	3	3	0	0	10	0	+10	9	Elite round
2	Montenegro	3	1	1	1	2	3	−1	4	Elite round
3	Cyprus	3	1	0	2	3	9	−6	3	
4	Belarus (H)	3	0	1	2	3	6	−3	1	

Source: UEFA
Rules for classification: Qualification tiebreakers
(H) Hosts
30 September 2015
14:00

Belarus	1–1	Montenegro
Ksenofontov 12'	Report	Zečević 33'

City Stadium, Orsha
Referee: Sándor Andó-Szabó (Hungary)
30 September 2015
17:00

Russia	6–0	Cyprus
Latsevich 27', 40+1'; Rudenko 30', 44' (pen.); Papoutsos 72' (o.g.); Vartanyan 75'	Report

Spartak Stadium, Mogilev
Referee: Irfan Peljto (Bosnia and Herzegovina)

2 October 2015
14:00

Belarus	2–3	Cyprus
Kapov 10'; Malkevich 35'	Report	Louka 50', 52', 78'

City Stadium, Orsha
Referee: Irfan Peljto (Bosnia and Herzegovina)
2 October 2015
17:00

Montenegro	0–2	Russia
	Report	Suleymanov 44'; Patsev 77'

Spartak Stadium, Mogilev
Referee: Bardhyl Pashaj (Albania)

5 October 2015
14:00

Russia	2–0	Belarus
Golubev 62'; Rudenko 68'	Report

City Stadium, Orsha
Referee: Sándor Andó-Szabó (Hungary)
5 October 2015
14:00

Cyprus	0–1	Montenegro
	Report	Vukotić 46' (pen.)

Spartak Stadium, Mogilev
Referee: Bardhyl Pashaj (Albania)

==== Group 3 ====
Pos	Team	Pld	W	D	L	GF	GA	GD	Pts	Qualification
1	Republic of Ireland	3	2	1	0	8	1	+7	7	Elite round
2	Sweden	3	1	2	0	7	3	+4	5	Elite round
3	Finland (H)	3	1	1	1	5	4	+1	4	Elite round
4	Malta	3	0	0	3	3	15	−12	0	

Source: UEFA
Rules for classification: Qualification tiebreakers
(H) Hosts
24 September 2015
13:00

Sweden	5–1	Malta
Bellman 11'; Bergqvist 15', 25', 35', 62'	Report	Elouni 69'

Eerikkilä Areena, Tammela
Referee: Edin Jakupović (Bosnia and Herzegovina)
24 September 2015
17:00

Republic of Ireland	1–0	Finland
Molumby 22'	Report

Eerikkilä Areena, Tammela
Referee: Milan Ilić (Serbia)

26 September 2015
11:00

Malta	0–6	Republic of Ireland
	Report	Cregan 28', 60' (pen.), 74'; Rice 33', 39'; Flanagan 53'

Harju Sport Center, Lohja
Referee: Vladimir Vnuk (Slovakia)
26 September 2015
15:00

Sweden	1–1	Finland
Asoro 80+2'	Report	Jokelainen 21'

Harju Sport Center, Lohja
Referee: Milan Ilić (Serbia)

29 September 2015
15:45

Republic of Ireland	1–1	Sweden
McAuley 39'	Report	Colley 77'

Harju Sport Center, Lohja
Referee: Edin Jakupović (Bosnia and Herzegovina)
29 September 2015
15:45

Finland	4–2	Malta
Stavitski 29'; Hyökyvirta 46'; Montola 69'; Saira 80+3'	Report	Frendo 53'; Elouni 77'

Eerikkilä Areena, Tammela
Referee: Vladimir Vnuk (Slovakia)

==== Group 4 ====
Pos	Team	Pld	W	D	L	GF	GA	GD	Pts	Qualification
1	Slovakia	3	1	2	0	6	5	+1	5	Elite round
2	Georgia	3	1	1	1	8	6	+2	4 (Note: Ranked by head-to-head record (Georgia: 3 pts; Romania: 0 pts).)	Elite round
3	Romania	3	1	1	1	3	5	−2	4	
4	Hungary (H)	3	0	2	1	4	5	−1	2	

Source: UEFA
Rules for classification: Qualification tiebreakers
(H) Hosts
Notes:
24 October 2015
13:15

Hungary	1–2	Romania
Bévárdi 66'	Report	Craiu 8'; Dragomir 68'

Globall Football Park, Telki
Referee: Charalambos Kalogeropoulos (Greece)
24 October 2015
13:30

Georgia	3–4	Slovakia
Kavtaradze 10' (pen.); Ninua 66'; Kharabadze 71'	Report	Gerebenits 22'; Vician 55'; Vaško 59'; Kopas 80+1'

Városi Stadion, Dabas
Referee: Anders Poulsen (Denmark)

26 October 2015
13:30

Hungary	1–1	Slovakia
Virág 24' (pen.)	Report	Almási 80+4'

Pancho Arena, Felcsút
Referee: Dimitrios Massias (Cyprus)
26 October 2015
13:30

Romania	0–3	Georgia
	Report	Spanderashvili 24'; Chakbetadze 44'; Ninua 68'

Városi Stadion, Dabas
Referee: Anders Poulsen (Denmark)

29 October 2015
13:30

Georgia	2–2	Hungary
Kavtaradze 21'; Ozbetelashvili 80+2'	Report	Timári 22'; Virág 44'

Pancho Arena, Felcsút
Referee: Charalambos Kalogeropoulos (Greece)
29 October 2015
13:30

Slovakia	1–1	Romania
Almási 80+3'	Report	Craiu 10'

Városi Stadion, Dabas
Referee: Dimitrios Massias (Cyprus)

==== Group 5 ====
Pos	Team	Pld	W	D	L	GF	GA	GD	Pts	Qualification
1	Austria	3	2	1	0	5	2	+3	7	Elite round
2	Serbia	3	1	2	0	7	2	+5	5	Elite round
3	Lithuania	3	1	1	1	2	2	0	4	
4	Luxembourg (H)	3	0	0	3	2	10	−8	0	

Source: UEFA
Rules for classification: Qualification tiebreakers
(H) Hosts
24 October 2015
16:00

Serbia	6–1	Luxembourg
Petrović 3'; Jovanović 28'; Tomašević 57'; Bosnjak 62' (pen.); Đorđević 68'; Joveljić 80'	Report	Thill 60'

Terrain Kuerzwénkel, Consdorf
Referee: Tsvetan Krastev (Bulgaria)
24 October 2015
16:00

Austria	2–0	Lithuania
Mathis 59'; Meister 65'	Report

Op Biirk, Mensdorf
Referee: Orkhan Mammadov (Azerbaijan)

26 October 2015
16:00

Serbia	0–0	Lithuania
	Report

Terrain Kuerzwénkel, Consdorf
Referee: Petur Reinert (Faroe Islands)
26 October 2015
19:00

Luxembourg	1–2	Austria
Thill 38'	Report	Riegler 31'; Baumgartner 47'

Stade rue Henri Dunant, Beggen
Referee: Orkhan Mammadov (Azerbaijan)

29 October 2015
19:00

Austria	1–1	Serbia
V. Müller 2'	Report	Veselinović 22'

Stade rue Henri Dunant, Beggen
Referee: Tsvetan Krastev (Bulgaria)
29 October 2015
19:00

Lithuania	2–0	Luxembourg
Sūnelaitis 37'; Kubilinskas 66'	Report

Op Biirk, Mensdorf
Referee: Petur Reinert (Faroe Islands)

==== Group 6 ====
Pos	Team	Pld	W	D	L	GF	GA	GD	Pts	Qualification
1	Spain	3	3	0	0	6	1	+5	9	Elite round
2	Poland	3	2	0	1	6	2	+4	6	Elite round
3	Latvia (H)	3	1	0	2	3	6	−3	3	
4	Andorra	3	0	0	3	0	6	−6	0	

Source: UEFA
Rules for classification: Qualification tiebreakers
(H) Hosts
25 October 2015
12:30

Spain	2–0	Andorra
Ruiz 8'; Zabarte 38'	Report

Stadions Arkādija, Riga
Attendance: 40
Referee: Petr Ardeleánu (Czech Republic)
25 October 2015
17:00

Poland	4–0	Latvia
Macierzyński 23', 67'; Kwietniewski 40+1'; Gajda 70'	Report

Stadions Arkādija, Riga
Attendance: 428
Referee: Mohammed Al-Hakim (Sweden)

27 October 2015
12:30

Poland	1–0	Andorra
Macierzyński 21'	Report

Stadions Arkādija, Riga
Attendance: 78
Referee: Zaven Hovhannisyan (Armenia)
27 October 2015
17:00

Latvia	0–2	Spain
	Report	Mboula 20', 74'

Skonto Stadium, Riga
Attendance: 1017
Referee: Petr Ardeleánu (Czech Republic)

30 October 2015
17:00

Spain	2–1	Poland
Morlanes 33', 53'	Report	Szymański 8'

Stadions Arkādija, Riga
Attendance: 83
Referee: Mohammed Al-Hakim (Sweden)
30 October 2015
17:00

Andorra	0–3	Latvia
	Report	Čebotarjovs 53', 65'; Regža 60'

Skonto Stadium, Riga
Attendance: 413
Referee: Zaven Hovhannisyan (Armenia)

==== Group 7 ====
Pos	Team	Pld	W	D	L	GF	GA	GD	Pts	Qualification
1	Czech Republic	3	2	1	0	15	3	+12	7	Elite round
2	Croatia	3	2	1	0	8	3	+5	7	Elite round
3	Liechtenstein (H)	3	1	0	2	3	6	−3	3	
4	Gibraltar	3	0	0	3	2	16	−14	0	

Source: UEFA
Rules for classification: Qualification tiebreakers
(H) Hosts
26 October 2015
12:00

Croatia	4–1	Gibraltar
Javorčić 2', 80+1' (pen.); Knežević 11', 80+3'	Report	Espinosa 49'

Sportpark Eschen-Mauren, Eschen
Referee: Denis Scherbakov (Belarus)
26 October 2015
15:00

Czech Republic	4–0	Liechtenstein
Růsek 19'; Graiciar 48'; Sadílek 52'; Kubala 63'	Report

Sportpark Eschen-Mauren, Eschen
Referee: Suren Baliyan (Armenia)

28 October 2015
12:00

Gibraltar	1–9	Czech Republic
Valarino 39'	Report	Graiciar 2', 25', 30'; Burda 4'; Sedláček 15', 37'; Zikl 27'; Kubala 74'; Sadílek 77'

Sportplatz Rheinau, Balzers
Referee: Suren Baliyan (Armenia)
28 October 2015
15:00

Croatia	2–0	Liechtenstein
Vujčić 15'; Čuže 19'	Report

Sportplatz Rheinau, Balzers
Referee: Adrian Azzopardi (Malta)

31 October 2015
15:00

Czech Republic	2–2	Croatia
Chytil 49'; Beňo 66'	Report	Špikić 55'; Kulenović 70'

Sportplatz Rheinau, Balzers
Referee: Denis Scherbakov (Belarus)
31 October 2015
15:00

Liechtenstein	3–0	Gibraltar
Caglar 6'; N. Graber 35'; Cottrel 65' (o.g.)	Report

Sportpark Eschen-Mauren, Eschen
Referee: Adrian Azzopardi (Malta)

==== Group 8 ====
Pos	Team	Pld	W	D	L	GF	GA	GD	Pts	Qualification
1	Denmark	3	2	1	0	6	1	+5	7	Elite round
2	Greece	3	1	2	0	7	1	+6	5	Elite round
3	Iceland (H)	3	1	1	1	6	3	+3	4	Elite round
4	Kazakhstan	3	0	0	3	1	15	−14	0	

Source: UEFA
Rules for classification: Qualification tiebreakers
(H) Hosts
22 September 2015
18:00

Denmark	0–0	Greece
	Report

Keflavíkurvöllur, Keflavík
Referee: Rob Rogers (Republic of Ireland)
22 September 2015
18:00

Iceland	5–0	Kazakhstan
Jónsson 18', 35'; Hauksson 22'; Kristjansson 33'; Andrason 78' (pen.)	Report

Grindavíkurvöllur, Grindavík
Referee: Laurent Kopriwa (Luxembourg)

24 September 2015
17:00

Denmark	4–1	Kazakhstan
Odgaard 1'; Poulsen 25'; Bruus 62'; Jensen 70'	Report	Oral 55'

Kaplakrikavöllur, Hafnarfjörður
Referee: Rob Rogers (Republic of Ireland)
24 September 2015
21:15

Greece	1–1	Iceland
Kostanasios 65'	Report	Finnsson 45'

Laugardalsvöllur, Reykjavík
Referee: Aleksandrs Anufrijevs (Latvia)

27 September 2015
18:00

Iceland	0–2	Denmark
	Report	Bruus 58'; Okkels 79'

Keflavíkurvöllur, Keflavík
Referee: Aleksandrs Anufrijevs (Latvia)
27 September 2015
18:00

Kazakhstan	0–6	Greece
	Report	Tzovaras 5', 68'; Chatzidimpas 53'; Lolos 59'; Xenitidis 65'; Bortay 78' (o.g.)

Grindavíkurvöllur, Grindavík
Referee: Laurent Kopriwa (Luxembourg)

==== Group 9 ====
Pos	Team	Pld	W	D	L	GF	GA	GD	Pts	Qualification
1	England	3	2	1	0	14	1	+13	7	Elite round
2	Portugal (H)	3	2	1	0	13	1	+12	7	Elite round
3	Armenia	3	0	1	2	1	13	−12	1	
4	San Marino	3	0	1	2	1	14	−13	1	

Source: UEFA
Rules for classification: Qualification tiebreakers
(H) Hosts
29 September 2015
15:00

England	8–0	San Marino
Ennis 6'; Leko 11'; Nelson 16'; Brown 21'; Shashoua 30', 42'; Adeniran 47'; Lewis 49'	Report

Complexo Desportivo de Febres, Febres
Referee: Dejan Jakimovski (Macedonia)
29 September 2015
17:00

Portugal	7–0	Armenia
Quina 9', 42'; Gomes 39', 68'; Filipe 40+1', 58'; Leão 78'	Report

Centro de Treino, Luso
Referee: Oleksandr Derdo (Ukraine)

1 October 2015
15:00

England	5–0	Armenia
Dozzell 18'; Nelson 23', 42', 54'; Embleton 75'	Report

Estádio Municipal Carlos Duarte, Pampilhosa
Referee: Alexandru Tean (Moldova)
1 October 2015
17:00

San Marino	0–5	Portugal
	Report	Miguel Luís 8'; Tipote 11' (pen.); Filipe 61', 80+3'; Gomes 80'

Complexo Desportivo da Tocha, Tocha
Referee: Dejan Jakimovksi (Macedonia)

4 October 2015
17:00

Portugal	1–1	England
Filipe 64'	Report	Chalobah 16'

Estádio Municipal Sérgio Conceição, Coimbra
Referee: Oleksandr Derdo (Ukraine)
4 October 2015
17:00

Armenia	1–1	San Marino
Harutyunyan 29'	Report	Frisoni 75'

Estádio Municipal Carlos Duarte, Pampilhosa
Referee: Alexandru Tean (Moldova)

==== Group 10 ====
Pos	Team	Pld	W	D	L	GF	GA	GD	Pts	Qualification
1	Belgium	3	2	1	0	6	2	+4	7	Elite round
2	Turkey	3	1	2	0	4	1	+3	5	Elite round
3	Slovenia (H)	3	1	1	1	3	3	0	4	Elite round
4	Faroe Islands	3	0	0	3	1	8	−7	0	

Source: UEFA
Rules for classification: Qualification tiebreakers
(H) Hosts
24 September 2015
15:00

Turkey	3–0	Faroe Islands
Yalçın 17', 19', 39'	Report

Stadion Bakovci, Bakovci
Referee: Giorgi Kruashvili (Georgia)
24 September 2015
15:00

Belgium	2–1	Slovenia
Vanheusden 2'; Vanhaecke 77'	Report	Čerin 60'

Lendava Sports Park, Lendava
Referee: Bryn Markham-Jones (Wales)

26 September 2015
15:00

Turkey	1–1	Slovenia
Ömür 6'	Report	Celar 80+3'

Lendava Sports Park, Lendava
Referee: Jens Maae (Denmark)
26 September 2015
15:00

Faroe Islands	1–4	Belgium
Mortensen 76'	Report	Corryn 19'; Vanhaecke 21', 39'; Ndayishimiye 29'

Stadion Bakovci, Bakovci
Referee: Giorgi Kruashvili (Georgia)

29 September 2015
15:00

Belgium	0–0	Turkey
	Report

Lendava Sports Park, Lendava
Referee: Jens Maae (Denmark)
29 September 2015
15:00

Slovenia	1–0	Faroe Islands
Kerin 31'	Report

Stadion Bakovci, Bakovci
Referee: Bryn Markham-Jones (Wales)

==== Group 11 ====
Pos	Team	Pld	W	D	L	GF	GA	GD	Pts	Qualification
1	France	3	3	0	0	5	0	+5	9	Elite round
2	Israel (H)	3	2	0	1	5	5	0	6	Elite round
3	Northern Ireland	3	0	1	2	2	4	−2	1	
4	Norway	3	0	1	2	2	5	−3	1	

Source: UEFA
Rules for classification: Qualification tiebreakers
(H) Hosts
20 October 2015
14:00

Norway	1–3	Israel
Borchgrevink 57'	Report	Almog 34' (pen.), 53'; Sarsur 72'

HaMoshava Stadium, Petah Tikva
Referee: Tomasz Musiał (Poland)
20 October 2015
14:00

France	1–0	Northern Ireland
Cuisance 65' (pen.)	Report

Shefayim National Team Complex, Shefayim
Referee: Fran Jović (Croatia)

22 October 2015
14:00

Norway	1–1	Northern Ireland
Agouda 63'	Report	Gallagher 49'

Shefayim National Team Complex, Shefayim
Referee: Ádám Farkas (Hungary)
22 October 2015
14:00

Israel	0–3	France
	Report	Taha 43'; Guitane 58'; El Mokeddem 67'

HaMoshava Stadium, Petah Tikva
Referee: Tomasz Musiał (Poland)

25 October 2015
14:00

France	1–0	Norway
Nguiamba 69'	Report

Shefayim National Team Complex, Shefayim
Referee: Fran Jović (Croatia)
25 October 2015
14:00

Northern Ireland	1–2	Israel
Browne 36'	Report	Almog 12'; Nadir 34'

HaMoshava Stadium, Petah Tikva
Referee: Ádám Farkas (Hungary)

==== Group 12 ====
Pos	Team	Pld	W	D	L	GF	GA	GD	Pts	Qualification
1	Italy	3	1	2	0	4	1	+3	5	Elite round
2	Bulgaria (H)	3	1	1	1	2	3	−1	4 (Note: Ranked by head-to-head record (Bulgaria: 3 pts; Scotland: 0 pts).)	Elite round
3	Scotland	3	1	1	1	4	3	+1	4	Elite round
4	Macedonia	3	0	2	1	0	3	−3	2	

Source: UEFA
Rules for classification: Qualification tiebreakers
(H) Hosts
Notes:
21 October 2015
15:30

Italy	3–0	Bulgaria
Scamacca 63'; Pinamonti 67' (pen.); Gabbia 77'	Report

Arena Sozopol, Sozopol
Referee: Sascha Amhof (Switzerland)
21 October 2015
18:00

Scotland	3–0	Macedonia
Bowers 8'; L. Morrison 21'; Watson 70'	Report

Lazur Stadium, Burgas
Referee: Manuel Schuettengruber (Austria)

23 October 2015
15:30

Italy	0–0	Macedonia
	Report

Arena Sozopol, Sozopol
Referee: Roomer Tarajev (Estonia)
23 October 2015
18:00

Bulgaria	2–0	Scotland
Kostadinov 24'; Tilev 67'	Report

Lazur Stadium, Burgas
Referee: Sascha Amhof (Switzerland)

26 October 2015
16:00

Scotland	1–1	Italy
Duffy 32'	Report	Pinamonti 40+1'

Arena Sozopol, Sozopol
Referee: Manuel Schuettengruber (Austria)
26 October 2015
16:00

Macedonia	0–0	Bulgaria
	Report

Lazur Stadium, Burgas
Referee: Roomer Tarajev (Estonia)

==== Group 13 ====
Pos	Team	Pld	W	D	L	GF	GA	GD	Pts	Qualification
1	Ukraine	3	2	1	0	6	1	+5	7	Elite round
2	Bosnia and Herzegovina	3	2	0	1	7	4	+3	6	Elite round
3	Estonia	3	1	0	2	2	4	−2	3	
4	Moldova (H)	3	0	1	2	1	7	−6	1	

Source: UEFA
Rules for classification: Qualification tiebreakers
(H) Hosts
26 October 2015
14:00

Ukraine	1–1	Moldova
Deda 36'	Report	Domașcan 21'

CSR Orhei, Orhei
Referee: Dennis Antamo (Finland)
26 October 2015
14:00

Bosnia and Herzegovina	2–1	Estonia
Smajić 22'; Dadić 27'	Report	Poom 36'

Stadionul CPSM, Vadul lui Vodă
Referee: Erez Papir (Israel)

28 October 2015
14:00

Ukraine	2–0	Estonia
Popov 4'; Khakhlov 46' (pen.)	Report

Stadionul CPSM, Vadul lui Vodă
Referee: Alain Durieux (Luxembourg)
28 October 2015
14:00

Moldova	0–5	Bosnia and Herzegovina
	Report	Dadić 18'; Perić 25' (pen.); Veladžić 46', 74'; Smajić 65'

CSR Orhei, Orhei
Referee: Dennis Antamo (Finland)

31 October 2015
14:00

Bosnia and Herzegovina	0–3	Ukraine
	Report	Kashchuk 1'; Deda 30'; Kulakov 47'

Stadionul CPSM, Vadul lui Vodă
Referee: Erez Papir (Israel)
31 October 2015
14:00

Estonia	1–0	Moldova
Sorga 16'	Report

CSR Orhei, Orhei
Referee: Alain Durieux (Luxembourg)

=== Ranking of third-placed teams ===
To determine the five best third-placed teams from the qualifying round advancing to the elite round, only the results of the third-placed teams against the first and second-placed teams in their group were taken into account.

Pos	Grp	Team	Pld	W	D	L	GF	GA	GD	Pts	Qualification
1	1	Wales	2	1	0	1	2	2	0	3	Elite round
2	10	Slovenia	2	0	1	1	2	3	−1	1	Elite round
3	3	Finland	2	0	1	1	1	2	−1	1	Elite round
4	8	Iceland	2	0	1	1	1	3	−2	1 (Note: Tie broken by disciplinary points.)	Elite round
5	12	Scotland	2	0	1	1	1	3	−2	1	Elite round
6	5	Lithuania	2	0	1	1	0	2	−2	1	
7	4	Romania	2	0	1	1	1	4	−3	1	
8	11	Northern Ireland	2	0	0	2	1	3	−2	0	
9	13	Estonia	2	0	0	2	1	4	−3	0	
10	7	Liechtenstein	2	0	0	2	0	6	−6	0	
11	6	Latvia	2	0	0	2	0	6	−6	0	
12	2	Cyprus	2	0	0	2	0	7	−7	0	
13	9	Armenia	2	0	0	2	0	12	−12	0	

Source: UEFA
Rules for classification: 1) points; 2) goal difference; 3) goals scored; 4) disciplinary points; 5) drawing of lots.

== Elite round ==
=== Draw ===
The draw for the elite round was held on 3 December 2015, 11:45 CET (UTC+1), at the UEFA headquarters in Nyon, Switzerland.

The teams were seeded according to their results in the qualifying round. Germany, which received a bye to the elite round, were automatically seeded into Pot A. Each group contained one team from Pot A, one team from Pot B, one team from Pot C, and one team from Pot D. Winners and runners-up from the same qualifying round group could not be drawn in the same group, but third-placed teams could be drawn in the same group as winners or runners-up from the same qualifying round group. For political reasons, Russia and Ukraine (due to the Russian military intervention in Ukraine) could not be drawn in the same group.

Pos	Grp	Team	Pld	W	D	L	GF	GA	GD	Pts	Seeding
1	—	Germany	0	0	0	0	0	0	0	0	Pot A
2	2	Russia	3	3	0	0	10	0	+10	9	Pot A
3	6	Spain	3	3	0	0	6	1	+5	9	Pot A
4	11	France	3	3	0	0	5	0	+5	9	Pot A
5	9	England	3	2	1	0	14	1	+13	7	Pot A
6	7	Czech Republic	3	2	1	0	15	3	+12	7	Pot A
7	9	Portugal	3	2	1	0	13	1	+12	7	Pot A
8	3	Republic of Ireland	3	2	1	0	8	1	+7	7	Pot A
9	7	Croatia	3	2	1	0	8	3	+5	7	Pot B
10	13	Ukraine	3	2	1	0	6	1	+5	7 (Note: Tie broken by coefficient.)	Pot B
11	8	Denmark	3	2	1	0	6	1	+5	7	Pot B
12	10	Belgium	3	2	1	0	6	2	+4	7	Pot B
13	5	Austria	3	2	1	0	5	2	+3	7	Pot B
14	1	Netherlands	3	2	0	1	10	3	+7	6	Pot B
15	6	Poland	3	2	0	1	6	2	+4	6	Pot B
16	13	Bosnia and Herzegovina	3	2	0	1	7	4	+3	6	Pot B
17	11	Israel	3	2	0	1	5	5	0	6	Pot C
18	1	Switzerland	3	2	0	1	4	4	0	6	Pot C
19	8	Greece	3	1	2	0	7	1	+6	5	Pot C
20	5	Serbia	3	1	2	0	7	2	+5	5	Pot C
21	3	Sweden	3	1	2	0	7	3	+4	5	Pot C
22	10	Turkey	3	1	2	0	4	1	+3	5 (Note: Tie broken by disciplinary points.)	Pot C
23	12	Italy	3	1	2	0	4	1	+3	5	Pot C
24	4	Slovakia	3	1	2	0	6	5	+1	5	Pot C
25	8	Iceland	3	1	1	1	6	3	+3	4	Pot D
26	4	Georgia	3	1	1	1	8	6	+2	4	Pot D
27	3	Finland	3	1	1	1	5	4	+1	4	Pot D
28	12	Scotland	3	1	1	1	4	3	+1	4	Pot D
29	10	Slovenia	3	1	1	1	3	3	0	4	Pot D
30	1	Wales	3	1	1	1	3	3	0	4	Pot D
31	2	Montenegro	3	1	1	1	2	3	−1	4	Pot D
32	12	Bulgaria	3	1	1	1	2	3	−1	4	Pot D

Source: UEFA
Rules for classification: 1) points; 2) goal difference; 3) goals scored; 4) disciplinary points; 5) coefficient; 6) drawing of lots.

=== Groups ===
Times up to 26 March 2016 were CET (UTC+1), thereafter times were CEST (UTC+2).

==== Group 1 ====
Pos	Team	Pld	W	D	L	GF	GA	GD	Pts	Qualification
1	Denmark	3	2	0	1	8	4	+4	6	Final tournament
2	Scotland	3	1	1	1	3	5	−2	4 (Note: Ranked by head-to-head record (Scotland: 3 pts; Czech Republic: 0 pts).)	Final tournament
3	Czech Republic (H)	3	1	1	1	5	6	−1	4	
4	Switzerland	3	0	2	1	4	5	−1	2	

Source: UEFA
Rules for classification: Qualification tiebreakers
(H) Hosts
Notes:
28 March 2016
13:00

Denmark	4–0	Scotland
Odgaard 5', 50', 54'; Mikkelsen 58'	Report

Letná Stadion, Zlín
Referee: Donatas Rumšas (Lithuania)
28 March 2016
17:00

Czech Republic	2–2	Switzerland
Růsek 51'; Sedláček 77'	Report	Hajrizi 25'; Bajrami 80+2'

Městský fotbalový stadion Miroslava Valenty, Uherské Hradiště
Referee: Mitja Žganec (Slovenia)

30 March 2016
13:00

Switzerland	1–2	Denmark
Aliu 57'	Report	Holse 56' (pen.); Jakobsen 80+1'

Stadion Širuch, Stare Mesto
Referee: Donatas Rumšas (Lithuania)
30 March 2016
17:00

Czech Republic	0–2	Scotland
	Report	Morrison 21'; McLennan 64'

Letná Stadion, Zlín
Referee: Farrugia Cann Trustin (Malta)

2 April 2016
15:30

Denmark	2–3	Czech Republic
Odgaard 11'; Torp 68'	Report	Růsek 44'; Kubala 63'; Sadílek 80+1'

Letná Stadion, Zlín
Referee: Mitja Žganec (Slovenia)
2 April 2016
15:30

Scotland	1–1	Switzerland
Aitchison 46'	Report	Bajrami 72'

Stadion Širuch, Stare Mesto
Referee: Farrugia Cann Trustin (Malta)

==== Group 2 ====
Pos	Team	Pld	W	D	L	GF	GA	GD	Pts	Qualification
1	Ukraine	3	2	1	0	7	1	+6	7	Final tournament
2	England (H)	3	2	1	0	5	2	+3	7	Final tournament
3	Turkey	3	1	0	2	4	7	−3	3	
4	Finland	3	0	0	3	1	7	−6	0	

Source: UEFA
Rules for classification: Qualification tiebreakers
(H) Hosts
24 March 2016
16:00

Ukraine	3–0	Finland
Bondar 55'; Kashchuk 59'; Buletsa 67'	Report

Harrison Park, Leek
Referee: Fedayi San (Switzerland)
24 March 2016
20:00

England	3–1	Turkey
Nelson 38', 48' (pen.); Leko 42'	Report	Güçlü 78'

Proact Stadium, Chesterfield
Referee: Sérgio Piscarreta (Portugal)

26 March 2016
16:00

England	1–0	Finland
Dozzell 33'	Report

Harrison Park, Leek
Referee: Fedayi San (Switzerland)
26 March 2016
20:00

Turkey	0–3	Ukraine
	Report	Buletsa 35', 49'; Kozyrenko 73'

St George's Park Main Stadium, Burton upon Trent
Referee: Dumitri Muntean (Moldova)

29 March 2016
20:00

Ukraine	1–1	England
Sich 57'	Report	Taylor-Crossdale 16'

Pirelli Stadium, Burton upon Trent
Referee: Sergio Piscaretta (Portugal)
29 March 2016
20:00

Finland	1–3	Turkey
Louko 35'	Report	Demir 28'; Güçlü 70'; Engin 80+2'

St George's Park Main Stadium, Burton upon Trent
Referee: Dumitri Muntean (Moldova)

==== Group 3 ====
Pos	Team	Pld	W	D	L	GF	GA	GD	Pts	Qualification
1	Italy	3	2	0	1	5	1	+4	6 (Note: Ranked by head-to-head record (Italy: 3 pts, +3 GD; Bosnia and Herzegovina: 3 pts, 0 GD; Russia: 3 pts, −3 GD).)	Final tournament
2	Bosnia and Herzegovina	3	2	0	1	4	3	+1	6	Final tournament
3	Russia	3	2	0	1	3	5	−2	6	
4	Georgia (H)	3	0	0	3	1	4	−3	0	

Source: UEFA
Rules for classification: Qualification tiebreakers
(H) Hosts
Notes:
15 March 2016
11:00

Bosnia and Herzegovina	2–1	Georgia
Resić 16'; Kovač 75'	Report	Mirić 14' (o.g.)

Mikheil Meskhi Stadium, Tbilisi
Referee: Ferenc Karakó (Hungary)
15 March 2016
13:00

Russia	0–4	Italy
	Report	Melegoni 5' (pen.); Kean 25', 65'; Pinamonti 72'

Mikheil Meskhi Stadium-2, Tbilisi
Referee: Georgios Kyzas (Greece)

17 March 2016
11:00

Russia	1–0	Georgia
Grulev 40+2'	Report

Mikheil Meskhi Stadium, Tbilisi
Referee: Andrew Davey (Northern Ireland)
17 March 2016
13:00

Italy	0–1	Bosnia and Herzegovina
	Report	Hadžić 65'

Mikheil Meskhi Stadium-2, Tbilisi
Referee: Georgios Kyzas (Greece)

20 March 2016
11:00

Bosnia and Herzegovina	1–2	Russia
Hadžić 27'	Report	Latsevich 12'; Grulev 66'

Mikheil Meskhi Stadium-2, Tbilisi
Referee: Ferenc Karakó (Hungary)
20 March 2016
11:00

Georgia	0–1	Italy
	Report	Frattesi 46'

Mikheil Meskhi Stadium, Tbilisi
Referee: Andrew Davey (Northern Ireland)

==== Group 4 ====
Pos	Team	Pld	W	D	L	GF	GA	GD	Pts	Qualification
1	Germany (H)	3	2	1	0	7	2	+5	7	Final tournament
2	Netherlands	3	1	1	1	2	1	+1	4	Final tournament
3	Slovakia	3	1	0	2	4	7	−3	3	
4	Bulgaria	3	0	2	1	1	4	−3	2	

Source: UEFA
Rules for classification: Qualification tiebreakers
(H) Hosts
24 March 2016
15:00

Netherlands	0–0	Bulgaria
	Report

Stadion am Eisenbrand, Meerbusch
Referee: Martin Lundby (Norway)
24 March 2016
18:00

Germany	5–1	Slovakia
Dadachov 5'; Baxmann 26', 48'; Maier 43', 61'	Report	Kráľovič 22'

Paul-Janes-Stadion, Düsseldorf
Referee: Peter Kjaesgaard-Andersen (Denmark)

26 March 2016
12:00

Slovakia	0–2	Netherlands
	Report	Malen 16' (pen.); Vente 40'

Stadion am Eisenbrand, Meerbusch
Referee: Martin Lundby (Norway)
26 March 2016
15:00

Germany	1–1	Bulgaria
Schreck 48'	Report	Tilev 19' (pen.)

Stadion Ratingen, Ratingen
Referee: Rob Harvey (Republic of Ireland)

29 March 2016
18:00

Netherlands	0–1	Germany
	Report	Baxmann 25'

Paul-Janes-Stadion, Düsseldorf
Referee: Peter Kjaesgaard-Andersen (Denmark)
29 March 2016
18:00

Bulgaria	0–3	Slovakia
	Report	Almási 40'; Brenkus 48'; Vician 80+3'

Stadion Ratingen, Ratingen
Referee: Rob Harvey (Republic of Ireland)

==== Group 5 ====
Pos	Team	Pld	W	D	L	GF	GA	GD	Pts	Qualification
1	Portugal	3	3	0	0	7	2	+5	9	Final tournament
2	Sweden	3	2	0	1	3	3	0	6	Final tournament
3	Wales	3	1	0	2	2	2	0	3	
4	Croatia (H)	3	0	0	3	3	8	−5	0	

Source: UEFA
Rules for classification: Qualification tiebreakers
(H) Hosts
16 March 2016
12:30

Portugal	2–0	Sweden
Filipe 44' (pen.); Gomes 69'	Report

Stadion Veruda, Pula
Referee: Deniz Ates Bitnel (Turkey)
16 March 2016
15:30

Croatia	0–2	Wales
	Report	Woodburn 16'; Cullen 45'

Stadion Valbruna, Rovinj
Referee: Juri Frischer (Estonia)

18 March 2016
13:30

Portugal	1–0	Wales
Gomes 40'	Report

Stadion Veruda, Pula
Referee: Filip Glova (Slovakia)
18 March 2016
15:30

Sweden	2–1	Croatia
Isak 65'; Bergqvist 71'	Report	Javorčić 80+2'

Stadion Valbruna, Rovinj
Referee: Juri Frischer (Estonia)

21 March 2016
15:30

Croatia	2–4	Portugal
Špikić 35'; Javorčić 47' (pen.)	Report	Almeida 27'; Djú 31', 69'; Filipe 54' (pen.)

Stadion Aldo Drosina, Pula
Referee: Deniz Ates Bitnel (Turkey)
21 March 2016
15:30

Wales	0–1	Sweden
	Report	Isak 69'

Stadion Valbruna, Rovinj
Referee: Filip Glova (Slovakia)

==== Group 6 ====
Pos	Team	Pld	W	D	L	GF	GA	GD	Pts	Qualification
1	France (H)	3	2	0	1	3	2	+1	6	Final tournament
2	Austria	3	1	2	0	2	1	+1	5	Final tournament
3	Iceland	3	1	1	1	1	1	0	4	
4	Greece	3	0	1	2	0	2	−2	1	

Source: UEFA
Rules for classification: Qualification tiebreakers
(H) Hosts
29 March 2016
18:30

France	1–0	Greece
Maolida 58'	Report

Stade Saint-Jean, Anglet
Referee: Mario Zebec (Croatia)
29 March 2016
18:30

Austria	0–0	Iceland
	Report

Stade Kechiloa, Saint-Jean-de-Luz
Referee: Aleksandrs Golubevs (Latvia)

31 March 2016
18:30

France	1–0	Iceland
Taha 54'	Report

Stade Saint-Martin, Biarritz
Referee: Ryan Stewart (Wales)
31 March 2016
18:30

Greece	0–0	Austria
	Report

Stade Saint-Jean, Anglet
Referee: Aleksandrs Golubevs (Latvia)

3 April 2016
15:00

Austria	2–1	France
Sittsam 23'; Schmid 80+3'	Report	Taha 15'

Stade Kechiloa, Saint-Jean-de-Luz
Referee: Mario Zebec (Croatia)
3 April 2016
15:00

Iceland	1–0	Greece
Guðjónsson 63'	Report

Stade Saint-Martin, Biarritz
Referee: Ryan Stewart (Wales)

==== Group 7 ====
Pos	Team	Pld	W	D	L	GF	GA	GD	Pts	Qualification
1	Serbia	3	3	0	0	6	1	+5	9	Final tournament
2	Poland (H)	3	1	1	1	3	2	+1	4 (Note: Tie broken by penalty shoot-out, as they were playing each other in the last round of matches.)	
3	Republic of Ireland	3	1	1	1	3	2	+1	4	
4	Montenegro	3	0	0	3	0	7	−7	0	

Source: UEFA
Rules for classification: Qualification tiebreakers
(H) Hosts
Notes:
28 March 2016
15:00

Republic of Ireland	0–2	Serbia
	Report	S. Ilić 24'; Joveljić 61'

Stadion Znicza Pruszków, Pruszków
Referee: Glenn Nyberg (Sweden)
28 March 2016
18:00

Poland	2–0	Montenegro
Drawz 6'; Kopacz 53'	Report

Stadion Polonii Warszawa, Warsaw
Referee: Stavros Mantalos (Greece)

30 March 2016
14:00

Republic of Ireland	3–0	Montenegro
Molumby 40+3'; Mallon 71'; Byrne 79'	Report

Stadion ROSRRiT Siedlce, Siedlce
Referee: Kirill Levnikov (Russia)
30 March 2016
18:00

Serbia	2–1	Poland
S. Ilić 27'; Djerlek 56'	Report	Kwietniewski 78'

Stadion Polonii Warszawa, Warsaw
Referee: Stavros Mantalos (Greece)

2 April 2016
18:00

Poland	0–0	Republic of Ireland
	Report
Penalties
Kwietniewski (penalty scored); Puchacz (penalty scored); Chrzanowski (penalty scored); Macierzyński (penalty scored)	4–3	(penalty scored) T. O'Connor; (penalty missed) Wilson; (penalty scored) McKenna; (penalty scored) Carroll; (penalty missed) McAuley

Stadion Znicza Pruszków, Pruszków
Referee: Glenn Nyberg (Sweden)
2 April 2016
18:00

Montenegro	0–2	Serbia
	Report	Joveljić 28'; L. Ilić 57'

Stadion ROSRRiT Siedlce, Siedlce
Referee: Kirill Levnikov (Russia)

==== Group 8 ====
Pos	Team	Pld	W	D	L	GF	GA	GD	Pts	Qualification
1	Belgium (H)	3	1	2	0	1	0	+1	5 (Note: Tie broken by penalty shoot-out, as they were playing each other in the last round of matches.)	Final tournament
2	Spain	3	1	2	0	1	0	+1	5	Final tournament
3	Slovenia	3	0	3	0	1	1	0	3	
4	Israel	3	0	1	2	1	3	−2	1	

Source: UEFA
Rules for classification: Qualification tiebreakers
(H) Hosts
Notes:
11 March 2016
15:00

Spain	1–0	Israel
Ruiz 80+3'	Report

Belgian Football Center, Tubize
Referee: Pavel Orel (Czech Republic)
11 March 2016
15:00

Belgium	0–0	Slovenia
	Report

Begijnhofstadion, Overijse
Referee: Anastasios Papapetrou (Greece)

13 March 2016
15:00

Spain	0–0	Slovenia
	Report

Sportcomplex Dooren, Merchtem
Referee: Alex Troleis (Faroe Islands)
13 March 2016
15:00

Israel	0–1	Belgium
	Report	Verlinden 31'

Begijnhofstadion, Overijse
Referee: Anastasios Papapetrou (Greece)

16 March 2016
15:00

Belgium	0–0	Spain
	Report
Penalties
Emmers (penalty scored); Antonucci (penalty scored); Vanheusden (penalty scored); Foulon (penalty scored)	4–3	(penalty scored) Morlanes; (penalty scored) Ruiz; (penalty missed) Lozano; (penalty scored) Díaz; (penalty missed) Busquets

Sportcomplex Dooren, Merchtem
Referee: Pavel Orel (Czech Republic)
16 March 2016
15:00

Slovenia	1–1	Israel
Celar 26'	Report	Goldberg 74'

Belgian Football Center, Tubize
Referee: Alex Troleis (Faroe Islands)

=== Ranking of second-placed teams ===
To determine the seven best second-placed teams from the elite round qualifying for the final tournament, only the results of the second-placed teams against the first and third-placed teams in their group were taken into account.

Pos	Grp	Team	Pld	W	D	L	GF	GA	GD	Pts	Qualification
1	2	England	2	1	1	0	4	2	+2	4	Final tournament
2	6	Austria	2	1	1	0	2	1	+1	4	Final tournament
3	4	Netherlands	2	1	0	1	2	1	+1	3	Final tournament
4	3	Bosnia and Herzegovina	2	1	0	1	2	2	0	3	Final tournament
5	5	Sweden	2	1	0	1	1	2	−1	3	Final tournament
6	1	Scotland	2	1	0	1	2	4	−2	3	Final tournament
7	8	Spain	2	0	2	0	0	0	0	2	Final tournament
8	7	Poland	2	0	1	1	1	2	−1	1	

Source: UEFA
Rules for classification: 1) points; 2) goal difference; 3) goals scored; 4) disciplinary points; 5) drawing of lots.

== Qualified teams ==
The following 16 teams qualified for the final tournament:

Team	Qualified as	Qualified on	Previous appearances in tournament^{1} only U-17 era (since 2002)
Azerbaijan	Hosts	20 March 2012	0 (debut)
Denmark	Elite round Group 1 winners	30 March 2016	3 (2002, 2003, 2011)
Ukraine	Elite round Group 2 winners	26 March 2016	4 (2002, 2004, 2007, 2013)
Italy	Elite round Group 3 winners	20 March 2016	5 (2003, 2005, 2009, 2013, 2015)
Germany	Elite round Group 4 winners	29 March 2016	8 (2002, 2006, 2007, **2009**, 2011, 2012, 2014, 2015)
Portugal	Elite round Group 5 winners	18 March 2016	5 (2002, **2003**, 2004, 2010, 2014)
France	Elite round Group 6 winners	31 March 2016	9 (2002, **2004**, 2007, 2008, 2009, 2010, 2011, 2012, **2015**)
Serbia	Elite round Group 7 winners	30 March 2016	4 (2002, 2006, 2008, 2011)
Belgium	Elite round Group 8 winners	16 March 2016	4 (2006, 2007, 2012, 2015)
England	Elite round best seven runners-up	26 March 2016	10 (2002, 2003, 2004, 2005, 2007, 2009, **2010**, 2011, **2014**, 2015)
Austria	Elite round best seven runners-up	3 April 2016	4 (2003, 2004, 2013, 2015)
Netherlands	Elite round best seven runners-up	29 March 2016	9 (2002, 2005, 2007, 2008, 2009, **2011**, **2012**, 2014, 2015)
Bosnia and Herzegovina	Elite round best seven runners-up	20 March 2016	0 (debut)
Sweden	Elite round best seven runners-up	21 March 2016	1 (2013)
Scotland	Elite round best seven runners-up	2 April 2016	3 (2008, 2014, 2015)
Spain	Elite round best seven runners-up	2 April 2016	9 (2002, 2003, 2004, 2006, **2007**, **2008**, 2009, 2010, 2015)

^{1} Bold indicates champion for that year. Italic indicates host for that year.

== Top goalscorers ==
The following players scored four goals or more in the qualifying competition:

7 goals

- (Portugal) João Filipe

6 goals

- (England) Reiss Nelson

5 goals

- (Denmark) Jens Odgaard
- (Netherlands) Dylan Vente
- (Portugal) José Gomes
- (Sweden) Teddy Bergqvist

4 goals

- (Croatia) Duje Javorčić
- (Czech Republic) Martin Graiciar
