= 2021 UEFA European Under-17 Championship qualification =

Tournament details
- Dates: Qualifying round: Cancelled (originally March 2021); Elite round: Abolished
- Teams: 54 (from 1 confederation)

The 2021 UEFA European Under-17 Championship qualifying competition was to be a men's under-17 football competition that would have determined the 15 teams joining the automatically qualified hosts Cyprus in the 2021 UEFA European Under-17 Championship final tournament. Players born on or after 1 January 2004 were eligible to participate.

Apart from Cyprus, all remaining 54 UEFA member national teams entered the qualifying competition, where the original format was to consist of two rounds: Qualifying round, which would have taken place in autumn 2020, and Elite round, which would also have taken place in spring 2021. However, due to the COVID-19 pandemic in Europe, UEFA announced on 13 August 2020 that after consultation with the 55 member associations, the qualifying round was delayed to March 2021, and the elite round was abolished, with the 13 qualifying round group winners joining the top two seeds by coefficient ranking, Netherlands and Spain (which originally received byes to the elite round), in the final tournament.

On 18 December 2020, the UEFA Executive Committee announced that the 2021 tournament was cancelled after consultation with all 55 member associations due to the pandemic.

== Format ==
The qualifying competition originally consisted of the following two rounds:

- Qualifying round: Apart from Netherlands and Spain, which receive byes to the elite round as the teams with the highest seeding coefficient, the remaining 52 teams were drawn into 13 groups of four teams. Each group was to be played in single round-robin format at one of the teams selected as hosts after the draw. The 13 group winners, the 13 runners-up, and the four third-placed teams with the best record against the first and second-placed teams in their group were to advance to the elite round.
- Elite round: The 32 teams were to be drawn into eight groups of four teams. Each group was to be played in single round-robin format at one of the teams selected as hosts after the draw. The eight group winners and the seven runners-up with the best record against all teams in their group were to qualify for the final tournament.

After the format change, the qualifying competition consists of only one round:

- Qualifying round: The draw remained the same as before. The 13 group winners, Netherlands and Spain, which originally received byes to the elite round, were to qualify for the final tournament.

== Qualifying round ==
=== Draw ===
The draw for the qualifying round was held on 3 December 2019, 09:00 CET (UTC+1), at the UEFA headquarters in Nyon, Switzerland.

The teams were seeded according to their coefficient ranking, calculated based on the following:

- 2016 UEFA European Under-17 Championship final tournament and qualifying competition (qualifying round and elite round)
- 2017 UEFA European Under-17 Championship final tournament and qualifying competition (qualifying round and elite round)
- 2018 UEFA European Under-17 Championship final tournament and qualifying competition (qualifying round and elite round)
- 2019 UEFA European Under-17 Championship final tournament and qualifying competition (qualifying round and elite round)

Each group contained one team from Pot A, one team from Pot B, one team from Pot C, and one team from Pot D. Based on the decisions taken by the UEFA Emergency Panel, the following pairs of teams could not be drawn in the same group: Serbia and Kosovo, Bosnia and Herzegovina and Kosovo, Russia and Kosovo, Azerbaijan and Armenia.

Final tournament hosts
Team	Coeff.	Rank
**Cyprus**	6.167	—

Bye to elite round
Team	Coeff.	Rank
Netherlands	28.556	1
Spain	27.444	2

Teams entering qualifying round

Pot A
Team	Coeff.	Rank
England	23.056	3
Italy	22.667	4
Portugal	20.722	5
Germany	19.833	6
France	18.944	7
Belgium	18.556	8
Republic of Ireland	16.833	9
Sweden	15.278	10
Hungary	14.389	11
Austria	13.556	12
Serbia	13.278	13
Turkey	12.667	14
Bosnia and Herzegovina	12.333	15

Pot B
Team	Coeff.	Rank
Scotland	12.000	16
Ukraine	11.889	17
Czech Republic	11.722	18
Israel	11.167	19
Switzerland	11.111	20
Denmark	11.000	21
Norway	10.722	22
Russia	10.667	23
Greece	10.222	24
Slovenia	10.111	25
Poland	10.000	26
Croatia	9.833	27
Slovakia	9.333	28

Pot C
Team	Coeff.	Rank
Iceland	8.167	29
Finland	7.833	30
Belarus	5.500	31
Romania	5.333	32
Azerbaijan	5.333	33
North Macedonia	4.833	34
Montenegro	4.667	35
Wales	4.500	36
Georgia	4.333	37
Northern Ireland	4.167	38
Bulgaria	4.000	39
Latvia	3.000	40
Faroe Islands	2.889	41

Pot D
Team	Coeff.	Rank
Lithuania	2.667	42
Albania	2.333	43
Estonia	2.333	44
Armenia	2.000	45
Kazakhstan	2.000	46
Kosovo	2.000	47
Andorra	1.333	48
Liechtenstein	1.000	49
Moldova	0.667	50
Luxembourg	0.667	51
San Marino	0.333	52
Malta	0.000	53
Gibraltar	0.000	54

Notes

- Teams marked in **bold** have qualified for the final tournament.

=== Groups ===
The qualifying round was originally scheduled to be played by 17 November 2020. However, due to the COVID-19 pandemic in Europe, UEFA announced on 13 August 2020 that after consultation with the 55 member associations, the qualifying round was delayed to March 2021.

Times up to 27 March 2021 are CET (UTC+1), thereafter times are CEST (UTC+2), as listed by UEFA (local times, if different, are in parentheses).

==== Group 1 ====
Originally scheduled to be played between 29 October and 4 November 2020.

Pos	Team	Pld	W	D	L	GF	GA	GD	Pts	Qualification
1	Bosnia and Herzegovina	0	0	0	0	0	0	0	**0**	Final tournament
2	Croatia (H)	0	0	0	0	0	0	0	**0**	
3	Bulgaria	0	0	0	0	0	0	0	**0**	
4	Liechtenstein	0	0	0	0	0	0	0	**0**	

Source: UEFA
Rules for classification: Tiebreakers
(H) Hosts
March 2021

Bosnia and Herzegovina	Cancelled	Liechtenstein
	Report

March 2021

Bulgaria	Cancelled	Croatia
	Report

March 2021

Bosnia and Herzegovina	Cancelled	Bulgaria
	Report

March 2021

Croatia	Cancelled	Liechtenstein
	Report

March 2021

Croatia	Cancelled	Bosnia and Herzegovina
	Report

March 2021

Liechtenstein	Cancelled	Bulgaria
	Report

==== Group 2 ====
Originally scheduled to be played between 22 and 28 October 2020.

Pos	Team	Pld	W	D	L	GF	GA	GD	Pts	Qualification
1	Italy	0	0	0	0	0	0	0	**0**	Final tournament
2	Slovenia	0	0	0	0	0	0	0	**0**	
3	Romania (H)	0	0	0	0	0	0	0	**0**	
4	Albania	0	0	0	0	0	0	0	**0**	

Source: UEFA
Rules for classification: Tiebreakers
(H) Hosts
March 2021

Italy	Cancelled	Albania
	Report

March 2021

Romania	Cancelled	Slovenia
	Report

March 2021

Italy	Cancelled	Romania
	Report

March 2021

Slovenia	Cancelled	Albania
	Report

March 2021

Slovenia	Cancelled	Italy
	Report

March 2021

Albania	Cancelled	Romania
	Report

==== Group 3 ====
Originally scheduled to be played between 21 and 27 October 2020.

Pos	Team	Pld	W	D	L	GF	GA	GD	Pts	Qualification
1	Republic of Ireland (H)	0	0	0	0	0	0	0	**0**	Final tournament
2	Slovakia	0	0	0	0	0	0	0	**0**	
3	Northern Ireland	0	0	0	0	0	0	0	**0**	
4	Estonia	0	0	0	0	0	0	0	**0**	

Source: UEFA
Rules for classification: Tiebreakers
(H) Hosts
March 2021

Republic of Ireland	Cancelled	Estonia
	Report

March 2021

Northern Ireland	Cancelled	Slovakia
	Report

March 2021

Republic of Ireland	Cancelled	Northern Ireland
	Report

March 2021

Slovakia	Cancelled	Estonia
	Report

March 2021

Slovakia	Cancelled	Republic of Ireland
	Report

March 2021

Estonia	Cancelled	Northern Ireland
	Report

==== Group 4 ====
Originally scheduled to be played between 7 and 13 October 2020.

Pos	Team	Pld	W	D	L	GF	GA	GD	Pts	Qualification
1	Belgium	0	0	0	0	0	0	0	**0**	Final tournament
2	Ukraine	0	0	0	0	0	0	0	**0**	
3	Georgia (H)	0	0	0	0	0	0	0	**0**	
4	Lithuania	0	0	0	0	0	0	0	**0**	

Source: UEFA
Rules for classification: Tiebreakers
(H) Hosts
March 2021

Belgium	Cancelled	Lithuania
	Report

March 2021

Georgia	Cancelled	Ukraine
	Report

March 2021

Belgium	Cancelled	Georgia
	Report

March 2021

Ukraine	Cancelled	Lithuania
	Report

March 2021

Ukraine	Cancelled	Belgium
	Report

March 2021

Lithuania	Cancelled	Georgia
	Report

==== Group 5 ====
Originally scheduled to be played between 6 and 12 October 2020.

Pos	Team	Pld	W	D	L	GF	GA	GD	Pts	Qualification
1	Turkey (H)	0	0	0	0	0	0	0	**0**	Final tournament
2	Russia	0	0	0	0	0	0	0	**0**	
3	Faroe Islands	0	0	0	0	0	0	0	**0**	
4	Gibraltar	0	0	0	0	0	0	0	**0**	

Source: UEFA
Rules for classification: Tiebreakers
(H) Hosts
March 2021

Turkey	Cancelled	Gibraltar
	Report

March 2021

Faroe Islands	Cancelled	Russia
	Report

March 2021

Turkey	Cancelled	Faroe Islands
	Report

March 2021

Russia	Cancelled	Gibraltar
	Report

March 2021

Russia	Cancelled	Turkey
	Report

March 2021

Gibraltar	Cancelled	Faroe Islands
	Report

==== Group 6 ====
Originally scheduled to be played between 7 and 13 October 2020.

Pos	Team	Pld	W	D	L	GF	GA	GD	Pts	Qualification
1	Portugal (H)	0	0	0	0	0	0	0	**0**	Final tournament
2	Czech Republic	0	0	0	0	0	0	0	**0**	
3	Montenegro	0	0	0	0	0	0	0	**0**	
4	Kosovo	0	0	0	0	0	0	0	**0**	

Source: UEFA
Rules for classification: Tiebreakers
(H) Hosts
March 2021

Portugal	Cancelled	Kosovo
	Report

March 2021

Montenegro	Cancelled	Czech Republic
	Report

March 2021

Portugal	Cancelled	Montenegro
	Report

March 2021

Czech Republic	Cancelled	Kosovo
	Report

March 2021

Czech Republic	Cancelled	Portugal
	Report

March 2021

Kosovo	Cancelled	Montenegro
	Report

==== Group 7 ====
Originally scheduled to be played between 24 and 30 September 2020.

Pos	Team	Pld	W	D	L	GF	GA	GD	Pts	Qualification
1	Sweden	0	0	0	0	0	0	0	**0**	Final tournament
2	Israel	0	0	0	0	0	0	0	**0**	
3	Finland (H)	0	0	0	0	0	0	0	**0**	
4	Kazakhstan	0	0	0	0	0	0	0	**0**	

Source: UEFA
Rules for classification: Tiebreakers
(H) Hosts
March 2021

Sweden	Cancelled	Kazakhstan
	Report

March 2021

Finland	Cancelled	Israel
	Report

March 2021

Sweden	Cancelled	Finland
	Report

March 2021

Israel	Cancelled	Kazakhstan
	Report

March 2021

Israel	Cancelled	Sweden
	Report

March 2021

Kazakhstan	Cancelled	Finland
	Report

==== Group 8 ====
Originally scheduled to be played between 11 and 17 November 2020.

Pos	Team	Pld	W	D	L	GF	GA	GD	Pts	Qualification
1	England	0	0	0	0	0	0	0	**0**	Final tournament
2	Greece (H)	0	0	0	0	0	0	0	**0**	
3	Azerbaijan	0	0	0	0	0	0	0	**0**	
4	San Marino	0	0	0	0	0	0	0	**0**	

Source: UEFA
Rules for classification: Tiebreakers
(H) Hosts
March 2021

England	Cancelled	San Marino
	Report

March 2021

Azerbaijan	Cancelled	Greece
	Report

March 2021

England	Cancelled	Azerbaijan
	Report

March 2021

Greece	Cancelled	San Marino
	Report

March 2021

Greece	Cancelled	England
	Report

March 2021

San Marino	Cancelled	Azerbaijan
	Report

==== Group 9 ====
Originally scheduled to be played between 7 and 13 October 2020.

Pos	Team	Pld	W	D	L	GF	GA	GD	Pts	Qualification
1	Austria (H)	0	0	0	0	0	0	0	**0**	Final tournament
2	Norway	0	0	0	0	0	0	0	**0**	
3	Iceland	0	0	0	0	0	0	0	**0**	
4	Moldova	0	0	0	0	0	0	0	**0**	

Source: UEFA
Rules for classification: Tiebreakers
(H) Hosts
March 2021

Austria	Cancelled	Moldova
	Report

March 2021

Iceland	Cancelled	Norway
	Report

March 2021

Austria	Cancelled	Iceland
	Report

March 2021

Norway	Cancelled	Moldova
	Report

March 2021

Norway	Cancelled	Austria
	Report

March 2021

Moldova	Cancelled	Iceland
	Report

==== Group 10 ====
Originally scheduled to be played between 11 and 17 November 2020.

Pos	Team	Pld	W	D	L	GF	GA	GD	Pts	Qualification
1	Hungary	0	0	0	0	0	0	0	**0**	Final tournament
2	Switzerland	0	0	0	0	0	0	0	**0**	
3	Belarus	0	0	0	0	0	0	0	**0**	
4	Luxembourg (H)	0	0	0	0	0	0	0	**0**	

Source: UEFA
Rules for classification: Tiebreakers
(H) Hosts
March 2021

Hungary	Cancelled	Luxembourg
	Report

March 2021

Belarus	Cancelled	Switzerland
	Report

March 2021

Hungary	Cancelled	Belarus
	Report

March 2021

Switzerland	Cancelled	Luxembourg
	Report

March 2021

Switzerland	Cancelled	Hungary
	Report

March 2021

Luxembourg	Cancelled	Belarus
	Report

==== Group 11 ====
Originally scheduled to be played between 11 and 17 November 2020.

Pos	Team	Pld	W	D	L	GF	GA	GD	Pts	Qualification
1	Germany	0	0	0	0	0	0	0	**0**	Final tournament
2	Poland	0	0	0	0	0	0	0	**0**	
3	North Macedonia (H)	0	0	0	0	0	0	0	**0**	
4	Malta	0	0	0	0	0	0	0	**0**	

Source: UEFA
Rules for classification: Tiebreakers
(H) Hosts
March 2021

Germany	Cancelled	Malta
	Report

March 2021

North Macedonia	Cancelled	Poland
	Report

March 2021

Germany	Cancelled	North Macedonia
	Report

March 2021

Poland	Cancelled	Malta
	Report

March 2021

Poland	Cancelled	Germany
	Report

March 2021

Malta	Cancelled	North Macedonia
	Report

==== Group 12 ====
Originally scheduled to be played between 24 and 30 September 2020.

Pos	Team	Pld	W	D	L	GF	GA	GD	Pts	Qualification
1	Serbia (H)	0	0	0	0	0	0	0	**0**	Final tournament
2	Denmark	0	0	0	0	0	0	0	**0**	
3	Latvia	0	0	0	0	0	0	0	**0**	
4	Armenia	0	0	0	0	0	0	0	**0**	

Source: UEFA
Rules for classification: Tiebreakers
(H) Hosts
March 2021

Serbia	Cancelled	Armenia
	Report

March 2021

Latvia	Cancelled	Denmark
	Report

March 2021

Serbia	Cancelled	Latvia
	Report

March 2021

Denmark	Cancelled	Armenia
	Report

March 2021

Denmark	Cancelled	Serbia
	Report

March 2021

Armenia	Cancelled	Latvia
	Report

==== Group 13 ====
Originally scheduled to be played between 30 October and 5 November 2020.

Pos	Team	Pld	W	D	L	GF	GA	GD	Pts	Qualification
1	France	0	0	0	0	0	0	0	**0**	Final tournament
2	Scotland (H)	0	0	0	0	0	0	0	**0**	
3	Wales	0	0	0	0	0	0	0	**0**	
4	Andorra	0	0	0	0	0	0	0	**0**	

Source: UEFA
Rules for classification: Tiebreakers
(H) Hosts
March 2021

France	Cancelled	Andorra
	Report

March 2021

Wales	Cancelled	Scotland
	Report

March 2021

France	Cancelled	Wales
	Report

March 2021

Scotland	Cancelled	Andorra
	Report

March 2021

Scotland	Cancelled	France
	Report

March 2021

Andorra	Cancelled	Wales
	Report

== Elite round ==
The draw for the elite round would originally be held on 9 December 2020 at the UEFA headquarters in Nyon, Switzerland, and the matches were originally scheduled to be played in spring 2021. However, due to the COVID-19 pandemic in Europe, UEFA announced on 13 August 2020 that after consultation with the 55 member associations, the elite round was abolished.

== Qualified teams ==
The following 16 teams were to qualify for the final tournament.

Team	Qualified as	Qualified on	Previous appearances in Under-17 Euro^{1} only U-17 era (since 2002)
Cyprus	Hosts	24 September 2019	0 (debut)
Netherlands	1st seed by coefficient ranking	13 August 2020	13 (2002, 2005, 2007, 2008, 2009, **2011**, **2012**, 2014, 2015, 2016, 2017, **2018**, **2019**)
Spain	2nd seed by coefficient ranking	13 August 2020	13 (2002, 2003, 2004, 2006, **2007**, **2008**, 2009, 2010, 2015, 2016, **2017**, 2018, 2019)
TBD	Qualifying round Group 1 winners	March 2021	
TBD	Qualifying round Group 2 winners	March 2021	
TBD	Qualifying round Group 3 winners	March 2021	
TBD	Qualifying round Group 4 winners	March 2021	
TBD	Qualifying round Group 5 winners	March 2021	
TBD	Qualifying round Group 6 winners	March 2021	
TBD	Qualifying round Group 7 winners	March 2021	
TBD	Qualifying round Group 8 winners	March 2021	
TBD	Qualifying round Group 9 winners	March 2021	
TBD	Qualifying round Group 10 winners	March 2021	
TBD	Qualifying round Group 11 winners	March 2021	
TBD	Qualifying round Group 12 winners	March 2021	
TBD	Qualifying round Group 13 winners	March 2021	

^{1} Bold indicates champions for that year. Italic indicates hosts for that year.
