= Azerbaijan national under-17 football team =

National youth association football team

Azerbaijan U-17
- Nickname: Milli (The National Team)
- Association: Association of Football; Federations of Azerbaijan
- Head coach: Agil Nabiyev
- Captain: Jalal Huseynov
- Most caps: Amit Guluzade (12)
- Top scorer: Cem Felek (5)
- FIFA code: AZE
| First colours | Second colours |

First international
- Azerbaijan 0–2 Slovakia (Ayia Napa, Cyprus; 2 March 1995)

Biggest win
- Liechtenstein 0–8 Azerbaijan (Doboj, Bosnia and Herzegovina; 30 October 2022)

Biggest defeat
- Azerbaijan 0–6 Northern Ireland (Apúlia e Fão, Portugal; 24 October 2010); Republic of Ireland 6–0 Azerbaijan (Gorna Oryahovitsa, Bulgaria; 10 October 2017)

European Championship
- Appearances: 1 (first in 2016)
- Best result: Group stage (2016)

The Azerbaijan national under-17 football team represents Azerbaijan in association football at the under-17 youth level, and is controlled by the Association of Football Federations of Azerbaijan.

== Competition history ==
In 2014, the team, under the management of Mirbağır İsayev, managed to qualify for the Elite Round of the 2015 UEFA European Under-17 Championship qualification stage due to being one of the best third-placed teams in the first qualification round. The team also qualified for the 2016 UEFA European Under-17 Championship after being selected as hosts.

== UEFA European Football Championship record ==
=== Under-16 format ===
| Finals record | | Qualification record | | | | | | | |
| Year | Result | Pos | Pld | W | D* | L | GF | GA | GD |
|---|---|---|---|---|---|---|---|---|---|
| (Republic of Ireland) 1994 | did not enter | 0 | 0 | 0 | 0 | 0 | 0 | 0 | 0 |
| (Belgium) 1995 | did not qualify | 3 | 2 | 0 | 0 | 2 | 0 | 4 | -4 |
| (Austria) 1996 | did not qualify | 2 | 2 | 1 | 0 | 1 | 3 | 2 | +1 |
| (Germany) 1997 | did not qualify | 4 | 3 | 0 | 1 | 2 | 1 | 6 | -5 |
| (Scotland) 1998 | did not qualify | 4 | 2 | 0 | 1 | 1 | 1 | 2 | -1 |
| (Czech Republic) 1999 | did not qualify | 4 | 3 | 0 | 2 | 1 | 1 | 2 | -1 |
| (Israel) 2000 | did not qualify | 3 | 2 | 0 | 0 | 2 | 0 | 5 | -5 |
| (England) 2001 | did not qualify | 2 | 2 | 1 | 0 | 1 | 5 | 4 | +1 |
| Total | 0/8 | Best: 2 | 16 | 2 | 4 | 10 | 12 | 25 | −13 |

=== Under-17 format ===
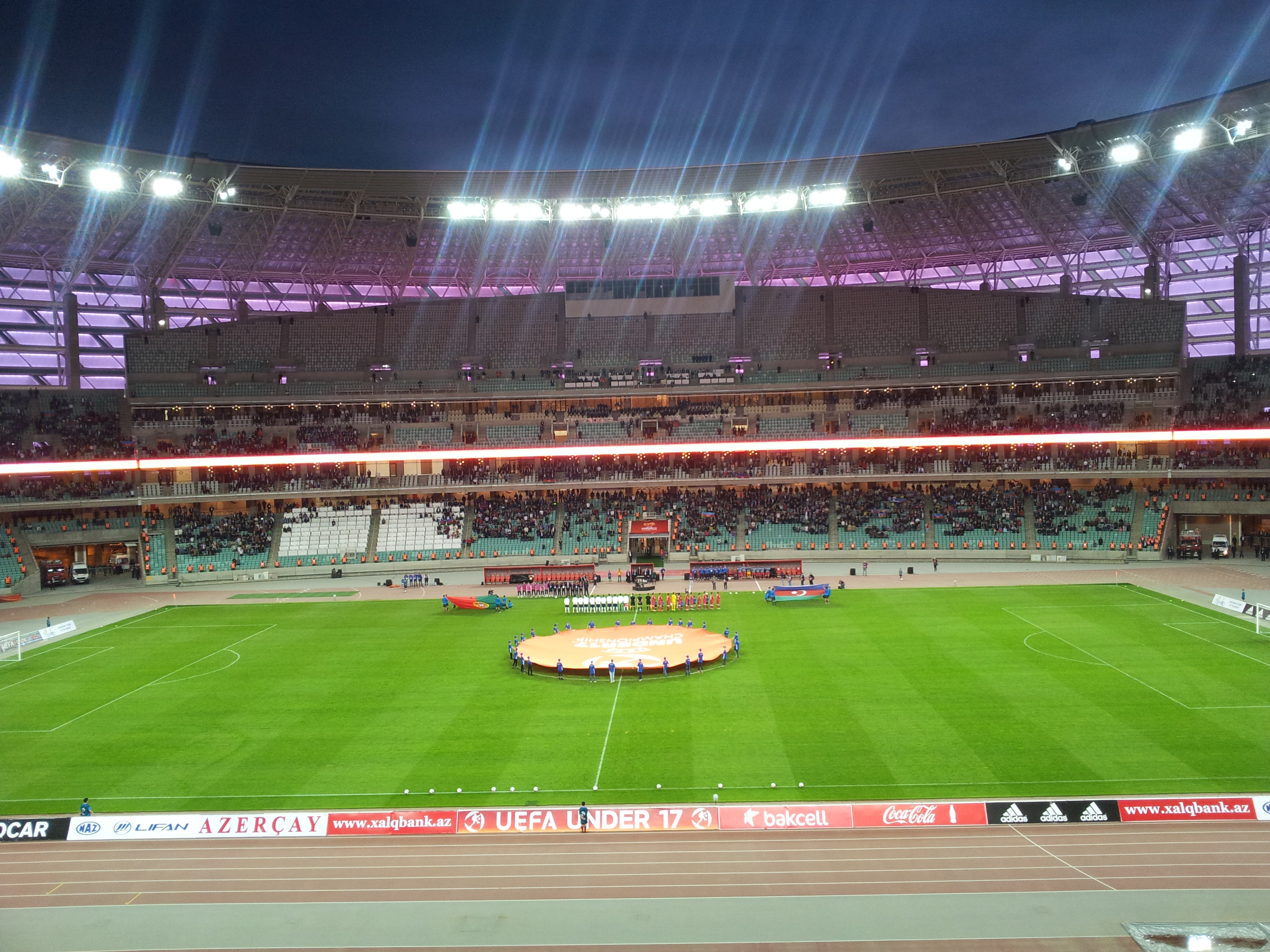
Azerbaijan playing against Portugal at Baku Olympic Stadium during the 2016 UEFA European Under-17 Championship.

| Finals record | | Qualification record | | | | | | |
| Year | Result | Pos | Pld | W | D* | L | GF | GA |
|---|---|---|---|---|---|---|---|---|
| (Denmark) 2002 | did not qualify | 3 | 3 | 1 | 0 | 2 | 4 | 9 |
| (Portugal) 2003 | Elite Round | 4 | 6 | 1 | 1 | 4 | 5 | 11 |
| (France) 2004 | did not qualify | 3 | 3 | 1 | 0 | 2 | 2 | 6 |
| (Italy) 2005 | Elite Round | 3 | 6 | 3 | 0 | 3 | 7 | 10 |
| (Luxembourg) 2006 | did not qualify | 3 | 3 | 1 | 1 | 1 | 5 | 6 |
| (Belgium) 2007 | Elite Round | 3 | 6 | 2 | 1 | 3 | 4 | 10 |
| (Turkey) 2008 | did not qualify | 4 | 3 | 0 | 2 | 1 | 3 | 4 |
| (Germany) 2009 | Elite Round | 3 | 6 | 1 | 2 | 3 | 5 | 9 |
| (Liechtenstein) 2010 | did not qualify | 3 | 3 | 1 | 1 | 1 | 3 | 5 |
| (Serbia) 2011 | did not qualify | 4 | 3 | 0 | 0 | 3 | 1 | 10 |
| (Slovenia) 2012 | did not qualify | 3 | 3 | 1 | 1 | 1 | 2 | 2 |
| (Slovakia) 2013 | did not qualify | 4 | 3 | 0 | 0 | 3 | 1 | 7 |
| (Malta) 2014 | did not qualify | 4 | 3 | 0 | 1 | 2 | 5 | 8 |
| (Bulgaria) 2015 | Elite Round | 4 | 6 | 1 | 1 | 4 | 3 | 16 |
| (Azerbaijan) 2016 | Group Stage | 3 | 3 | 1 | 1 | 1 | 2 | 6 |
| (Croatia) 2017 | did not qualify | 3 | 3 | 1 | 0 | 2 | 2 | 5 |
| (England) 2018 | did not qualify | 3 | 3 | 1 | 0 | 2 | 3 | 13 |
| (Republic of Ireland) 2019 | did not qualify | 4 | 3 | 0 | 0 | 3 | 1 | 7 |
| (Estonia) ~~2020~~ | Tournament was cancelled | 4 | 3 | 0 | 0 | 3 | 1 | 10 |
| (Cyprus) ~~2021~~ | Cancelled due to COVID-19 pandemic | | | | | | | |
| (Israel) 2022 | Azerbaijan abandoned all matches | | | | | | | |
| (Hungary) 2023 | did not qualify | 3 | 3 | 1 | 0 | 2 | 10 | 6 |
| (Cyprus) 2024 | did not qualify | 4 | 3 | 0 | 1 | 2 | 2 | 9 |
| (Albania) 2025 | did not qualify | 4 | 5 | 0 | 2 | 3 | 2 | 12 |
| Total | 1/22 | Best: 3 | 80 | 16 | 14 | 50 | 71 | 175 |

*Denotes draws include knockout matches decided on penalty kicks.

== Performance in recent competitions ==
=== Group B6 ===
| Pos | Team | Pld | W | D | L | GF | GA | GD | Pts | Promotion |
|---|---|---|---|---|---|---|---|---|---|---|
| 1 | Wales | 2 | 1 | 1 | 0 | 2 | 1 | +1 | 4 | Promotion for respective U-19 team for League A Round 1 of the 2026/27 season |
| 2 | Albania (H) | 2 | 1 | 0 | 1 | 5 | 3 | +2 | 3 | |
| 3 | Azerbaijan | 2 | 0 | 1 | 1 | 1 | 4 | −3 | 1 | |

Source: UEFA
Rules for classification: Qualification tiebreakers
(H) Hosts
19 March 2025
15:00

| Azerbaijan | 1–4 | Albania |
|---|---|---|
| Rzayev 53' | Report | Gjoka 7', 53', 64'; Kulla 76' |

Elbasan Arena, Elbasan
Referee: Jérémy Muller (Luxembourg)

22 March 2025
12:00

| Wales | 0–0 | Azerbaijan |
|---|---|---|
| | Report |

Elbasan Arena, Elbasan
Referee: Igor Bosca (Moldova)

25 March 2025
15:00

| Albania | 1–2 | Wales |
|---|---|---|
| Myrtaj 20' | Report | Grainger 64', 76' |

House of Football Natural Pitch, Tirana
Referee: Michele Beltrano (San Marino)

== Results ==
2016 UEFA European Under-17 Championship

| 5 May 2016 | Azerbaijan | 0–5 | Portugal | Baku Olympic Stadium, Baku |
| 20:00 | | Report | Gomes 4', 16'; Asadov 24' (o.g.); Miguel Luís 44'; Fernandes 76' | Attendance: 33,000; Referee: Bartosz Frankowski (Poland) |

| 8 May 2016 | Azerbaijan | 1–1 | Belgium | Bakcell Arena, Baku |
| 19:00 | Mahmudov 77' | Report | Bongiovanni 72' | Attendance: 1,500; Referee: Petr Ardeleánu (Czech Republic) |

| 11 May 2016 | Scotland | 0–1 | Azerbaijan | Bakcell Arena, Baku |
| 16:00 | | Report | Nabiyev 79' | Attendance: 3,000; Referee: Svein-Erik Edvartsen (Norway) |

2017 UEFA European Under-17 Championship qualification

| 25 October 2016 | England | 2–0 | Azerbaijan | Stadionul Buftea, Buftea |
| 18:00 | Gomes 16'; Sancho 23' | Report | | Referee: Fyodor Zammit (Malta) |

| 27 October 2016 | Austria | 3–1 | Azerbaijan | Stadionul Buftea, Buftea |
| 18:00 | Aganovic 3'; Schmid 60'; Wunsch 74' | Report | Sadikhov 23' | Referee: Petur Reinert (Faroe Islands) |

| 30 October 2016 | Azerbaijan | 1–0 | Romania | Stadionul Buftea, Buftea |
| 14:00 | Sadikhov 29' | Report | | Referee: Petur Reinert (Faroe Islands) |

2018 UEFA European Under-17 Championship qualification

| 10 October 2017 | Republic of Ireland | 6–0 | Azerbaijan | Lokomotiv Stadium, Gorna Oryahovitsa |
| 15:00 | Idah 6', 24', 58'; Brennan 36'; Murphy 38'; Wright 43' | Report | | Referee: Barbeno Luca (San Marino) |

| 13 October 2017 | Ukraine | 6–1 | Azerbaijan | Lokomotiv Stadium, Gorna Oryahovitsa |
| 15:00 | Mudryk 3' Yakuba 15' Sikan 35' Aussi 62' Biblyk 78' Shulianskyi 80+2' | Report | Zulfugarli 17' | Referee: Halil Umut Meler (Turkey) |

| 16 October 2017 | Azerbaijan | 2–1 | Bulgaria | Lokomotiv Stadium, Gorna Oryahovitsa |
| 17:00 | Valizade 18', 80+2' | Report | Nikolov 45' | Referee: Barbeno Luca (San Marino) |

2019 UEFA European Under-17 Championship qualification

| 23 October 2018 | Azerbaijan | 1–4 | Norway | Abdurrahman Roza Haxhiu Stadium, Lushnjë |
| 12:00 | Gurbanli 89' | Report | Geelmuyden 18' (pen.); Skrogstad 19'; Oppegård 20'; Vallotto 71' | Referee: Admir Šehović (Bosnia and Herzegovina) |

| 26 October 2018 | Czech Republic | 2–0 | Azerbaijan | Abdurrahman Roza Haxhiu Stadium, Lushnjë |
| 12:00 | Wojatschke 9'; Hložek 89' | Report | | Referee: Boris Marhefka (Slovakia) |

| 29 October 2018 | Albania | 1–0 | Azerbaijan | Elbasan Arena, Elbasan |
| 14:00 | Mitaj 44' (pen.) | Report | | Referee: Boris Marhefka (Slovakia) |

== Current squad ==
The following players have been called up for the most recent fixtures in 2026 UEFA European Under-17 Championship qualification.

| No. | Pos. | Player | Date of birth (age) | Club |
|---|---|---|---|---|
| 1 | GK | Ülvi Abbaslı | 23 October 2010 (age 16) | (Association of Football Federations of Azerbaijan) Sumgayit |
| 12 | GK | Oqtay Mehrəliyev | 28 February 2011 (age 15) | (Association of Football Federations of Azerbaijan) Qarabağ |
| 2 | DF | Rasul Balakishiyev | | (Royal Spanish Football Federation) Marcet |
| 3 | DF | Nijat Ahmadzada | | (Royal Spanish Football Federation) Marcet |
| 5 | DF | Ruslan Quliyev | 27 January 2010 (age 16) | (Association of Football Federations of Azerbaijan) Neftchi |
| 11 | DF | Tunar Bayramov | 13 February 2010 (age 16) | (Association of Football Federations of Azerbaijan) Qarabağ |
| 14 | DF | Arda Əzizli | 6 April 2010 (age 16) | (Association of Football Federations of Azerbaijan) Qarabağ |
| 4 | DF | Vaqif Nəbiyev | 11 February 2010 (age 16) | (Association of Football Federations of Azerbaijan) Qarabağ |
| 13 | DF | Roman Fərzəli | 15 May 2010 (age 16) | (Association of Football Federations of Azerbaijan) Qarabağ |
| 6 | MF | Ahad Hajizada | | (Association of Football Federations of Azerbaijan) Qarabağ |
| 7 | MF | Umid Aliyev | | (Royal Spanish Football Federation) Huesca |
| 8 | MF | Nihad Hüseynzadə | 3 August 2010 (age 16) | (Association of Football Federations of Azerbaijan) Sabah |
| 10 | MF | Nazim Aliyev | | (Football Association of Serbia) Crvena zvezda |
| 15 | MF | Şikar Şikar | 24 January 2010 (age 16) | (Association of Football Federations of Azerbaijan) Neftchi |
| 16 | MF | Yusif Orujaliyev | | (Association of Football Federations of Azerbaijan) Qarabağ |
| 17 | MF | Tunar Əsgərzadə | 18 March 2010 (age 16) | (Association of Football Federations of Azerbaijan) Qarabağ |
| 19 | MF | Firdovsi Şeydayev | 24 March 2010 (age 16) | (Association of Football Federations of Azerbaijan) Sabah |
| 20 | MF | Vagif Mammadli | | (Association of Football Federations of Azerbaijan) Sabah |
| 9 | FW | Hikmat Mirza | | |
| 18 | FW | Ruslan Abilov | | (Association of Football Federations of Azerbaijan) Sabah |

== Coaching staff ==
| Position | Name |
|---|---|
| Head coach | (Azerbaijan) Agil Nabiyev |
| Assistant coach | (Azerbaijan) Alexander Gross (Azerbaijan) Namig Adilov |
| Goalkeeping coach | (Azerbaijan) Etibar Tanriverdiyev |

== Manager history ==
- (Germany) Nicolai Adam (2014)
- (Azerbaijan) Mirbaghir Isayev (2014–2015)
- (Azerbaijan) Tabriz Hasanov (2015–2016)
- (Azerbaijan) Vugar Mammad (2016)
- (Azerbaijan) Mirbaghir Isayev (2017)
- (Azerbaijan) Ramin Guliyev (2018)
- (Azerbaijan) Vugar Mammad (2019–2020)

== Former squads ==
UEFA European Under-17

- 2016 UEFA European Under-17 Football Championship squads - Azerbaijan

== Achievements ==
- Winner of President's Cup Kazakhstan: 2011
- 3rd of Caspian Cup: 2011
- 2nd of Caspian Cup: 2012
- 2nd of Caspian Cup: 2013

== See also ==
- Azerbaijan national football team
- Azerbaijan national under-23 football team
- Azerbaijan national under-21 football team
- Azerbaijan national under-20 football team
- Azerbaijan national under-19 football team
- Azerbaijan national under-18 football team
