= Isaac Muleme =

Ugandan footballer (born 1992)

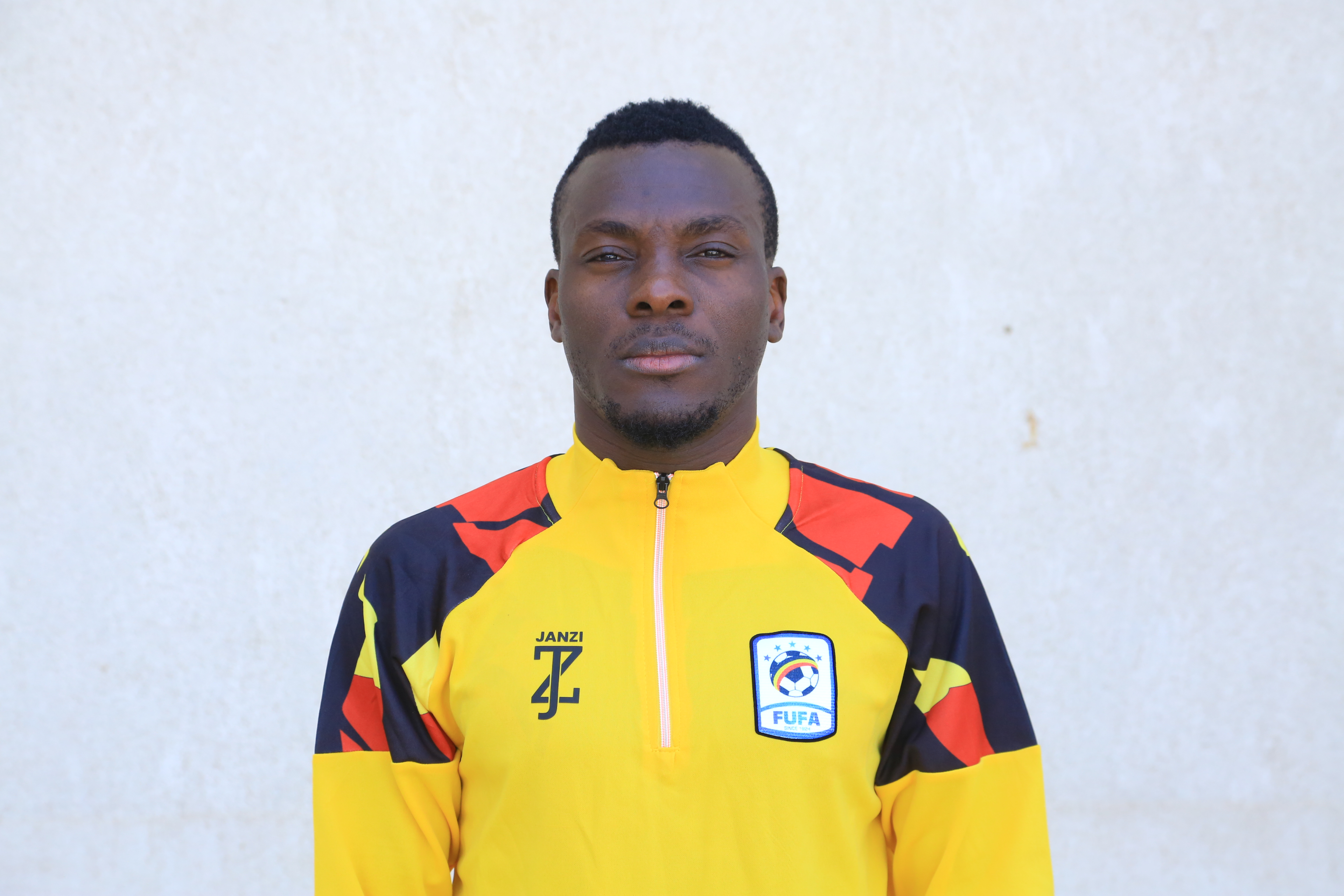
- Muleme with Uganda in 2025

Personal information
- Date of birth: 10 October 1992 (age 34)
- Place of birth: Kampala, Uganda
- Height: 1.67 m (5 ft 6 in)
- Position: Left-back

Senior career*
Years	Team	Apps	(Gls)
2009–2013	Villa		
2013–2015	Victoria University		
2015–2016	Villa		
2016–2017	KCCA FC		
2017–2018	Alassiouty Sport	13	(1)
2018–2019	Haras El Hodoud	8	(0)
2019–2025	Viktoria Žižkov	121	(3)
2020	→ Nitra (loan)	43	(0)

International career^{‡}
2013–	Uganda	52	(0)
- * Club domestic league appearances and goals as of 1 July 2025 ‡ National team caps and goals as of 1 July 2025

Isaac Muleme (born 10 October 1992) is a Ugandan professional footballer who plays as a left-back.

== Club career ==
In February 2019 Isaac joined Czech side Viktoria Žižkov from Egyptian club Haras El Hodoud.

In February 2020, Muleme joined Fortuna Liga side FC Nitra on a half-season loan. He made his league debut during first possible opportunity, in a home fixture at pod Zoborom, on 15 February 2020 against Pohronie. Pohronie and Nitra were in a direct battle to avoid direct relegation spots, with Nitra just a point ahead of Žiar nad Hronom-based novices. Muleme debuted in the 81st minute, when he entered as a substitute for Duje Javorčić. The match concluded in a goal-less tie.

== International career ==
In January 2014, coach Milutin Sredojević, invited him to be included in the Uganda national team for the 2014 African Nations Championship. The team placed third in the group stage of the competition after beating Burkina Faso, drawing with Zimbabwe and losing to Morocco.

On December 7, 2025, he was selected by Paul Put for Uganda's squad to participate in the 2025 Africa Cup of Nations.

== Career statistics ==
=== International ===
As of matches played on 14 July 2024

Appearances and goals by national team and year
National team	Year	Apps	Goals
Uganda	2013	3	0
Uganda	2014	5	0
Uganda	2015	6	0
Uganda	2016	1	0
Uganda	2017	11	0
Uganda	2018	7	0
Uganda	2019	4	0
Uganda	2021	6	0
Uganda	2022	2	0
Uganda	2024	2	0
Total		47	0
