= 2016 UEFA European Under-17 Championship =

2016 UEFA U-17 Avropa Çempionatı

Tournament details
- Host country: Azerbaijan
- Dates: 5–21 May
- Teams: 16 (from 1 confederation)
- Venue: 4 (in 1 host city)

Final positions
- Champions: Portugal (6th title)
- Runners-up: Spain

Tournament statistics
- Matches played: 31
- Goals scored: 73 (2.35 per match)
- Attendance: 61,606 (1,987 per match)
- Top scorer: (Portugal) José Gomes (7 goals)
- Best player: (Portugal) José Gomes

The 2016 UEFA European Under-17 Championship was the 15th edition of the UEFA European Under-17 Championship (34th edition if the Under-16 era is included), the annual European international youth football championship contested by the men's under-17 national teams of UEFA member associations. Azerbaijan, which were selected by UEFA on 20 March 2012, hosted the tournament between 5 and 21 May 2016.

A total of 16 teams competed in the final tournament, with players born on or after 1 January 1999 eligible to participate. Each match had a duration of 80 minutes, consisting of two halves of 40 minutes with a 15-minute half-time.

Portugal were crowned champions for the second time in the under-17 era, and sixth time overall, after beating Spain in the final 5–4 through a penalty shootout. France were the defending champions, but were eliminated in the group stage.

== Qualification ==
The national teams from all 54 UEFA member associations entered the competition. With Azerbaijan automatically qualified as hosts, the other 53 teams contested a qualifying competition to determine the remaining 15 spots in the final tournament. The qualifying competition consisted of two rounds: the qualifying round, which took place in autumn 2015, and the elite round, which took place in spring 2016.

=== Qualified teams ===
The following 16 teams qualified for the final tournament:

Note: All appearance statistics include only U-17 era (since 2002).

Team	Method of qualification	Finals appearance	Last appearance	Previous best performance
Azerbaijan	Hosts	1st	—	Debut
Denmark	Elite round Group 1 winners	4th	2011	Semi-finals (2011)
Scotland	Elite round Group 1 runners-up	4th	2015	Semi-finals (2014)
Ukraine	Elite round Group 2 winners	5th	2013	Group stage (2002, 2004, 2007, 2013)
England	Elite round Group 2 runners-up	11th	2015	Champions (2010, 2014)
Italy	Elite round Group 3 winners	6th	2015	Runners-up (2013)
Bosnia and Herzegovina	Elite round Group 3 runners-up	1st	—	Debut
Germany	Elite round Group 4 winners	9th	2015	Champions (2009)
Netherlands	Elite round Group 4 runners-up	10th	2015	Champions (2011, 2012)
Portugal	Elite round Group 5 winners	6th	2014	Champions (2003)
Sweden	Elite round Group 5 runners-up	2nd	2013	Semi-finals (2013)
France	Elite round Group 6 winners	10th	2015	Champions (2004, 2015)
Austria	Elite round Group 6 runners-up	5th	2015	Third place (2003)
Serbia	Elite round Group 7 winners	5th	2011	Quarter-finals (2002)
Belgium	Elite round Group 8 winners	5th	2015	Semi-finals (2007, 2015)
Spain	Elite round Group 8 runners-up	10th	2015	Champions (2007, 2008)

Notes

1. The best seven runners-up among all eight elite round groups qualified for the final tournament.

=== Final draw ===
The final draw was held on 8 April 2016, 12:00 AZT (UTC+4), at the Baku Olympic Stadium in Baku, Azerbaijan. The 16 teams were drawn into four groups of four teams. Hosts Azerbaijan were assigned to position A1 in the draw, while the other teams were seeded according to their results in the qualification elite round, with the seven best elite round group winners (counting all elite round results) placed in Pot 1 and drawn to positions 1 and 2 in the groups, and the remaining eight teams placed in Pot 2 and drawn to positions 3 and 4 in the groups.

- Pot 1: Portugal, Serbia, Ukraine, Germany, Denmark, Italy, France
- Pot 2: Belgium (eighth best group winner), England, Austria, Netherlands, Bosnia and Herzegovina, Sweden, Scotland, Spain

== Venues ==
The tournament was hosted in four venues, all in Baku:

Baku		2016 UEFA European Under-17 Championship is located in Azerbaijan	Baku	
Baku Olympic Stadium	Azersun Arena	2016 UEFA European Under-17 Championship is located in Azerbaijan	Bakcell Arena	Dalga Arena
Capacity: 68,000	Capacity: 4,735	2016 UEFA European Under-17 Championship is located in Azerbaijan	Capacity: 10,500	Capacity: 6,700

== Squads ==
Each national team had to submit a squad of 18 players.

== Match officials ==
A total of 8 referees, 12 assistant referees and 4 fourth officials were appointed for the final tournament.

Referees

- (Czech Republic) Petr Ardeleánu
- (Norway) Svein-Erik Edvartsen
- (Poland) Bartosz Frankowski
- (Iceland) Gunnar Jarl Jónsson
- (Croatia) Fran Jović
- (Slovakia) Peter Kráľovič
- (Finland) Ville Nevalainen
- (Slovenia) Mitja Žganec

Assistant referees

- (Hungary) Balázs Buzás
- (Faroe Islands) Andrew Christiansen
- (Greece) Lazaros Dimitriadis
- (Cyprus) Marios Dimitriadis
- (Republic of Ireland) Emmett Dynan
- (Moldova) Vasile Ermișchin
- (Switzerland) Alain Heiniger
- (Estonia) Neeme Neemlaid
- (Malta) Edward Spiteri
- (Turkey) Ceyhun Sesigüzel
- (Bulgaria) Georgi Todorov
- (Georgia (country)) Levan Varamishvili

Fourth officials

- (Azerbaijan) Aliyar Aghayev
- (Luxembourg) Alain Durieux
- (Azerbaijan) Orkhan Mammadov
- (Lithuania) Sergejus Slyva

== Group stage ==
Results of teams participating at the 2016 UEFA European Under-17 Championship

The final tournament schedule was confirmed on 12 April 2016.

The group winners and runners-up advanced to the quarter-finals.

Tiebreakers

The teams were ranked according to points (3 points for a win, 1 point for a draw, 0 points for a loss). If two or more teams were equal on points on completion of the group matches, the following tie-breaking criteria were applied, in the order given, to determine the rankings:

1. Higher number of points obtained in the group matches played among the teams in question;
2. Superior goal difference resulting from the group matches played among the teams in question;
3. Higher number of goals scored in the group matches played among the teams in question;
4. If, after having applied criteria 1 to 3, teams still had an equal ranking, criteria 1 to 3 were reapplied exclusively to the group matches between the teams in question to determine their final rankings. If this procedure did not lead to a decision, criteria 5 to 9 applied;
5. Superior goal difference in all group matches;
6. Higher number of goals scored in all group matches;
7. If only two teams had the same number of points, and they were tied according to criteria 1 to 6 after having met in the last round of the group stage, their rankings were determined by a penalty shoot-out (not used if more than two teams had the same number of points, or if their rankings were not relevant for qualification for the next stage).
8. Lower disciplinary points total based only on yellow and red cards received in the group matches (red card = 3 points, yellow card = 1 point, expulsion for two yellow cards in one match = 3 points);
9. Drawing of lots.

All times were local, AZT (UTC+4).

=== Group A ===
Pos	Team	Pld	W	D	L	GF	GA	GD	Pts	Qualification
1	Portugal	3	2	1	0	7	0	+7	7	Knockout stage
2	Belgium	3	1	2	0	3	1	+2	5	Knockout stage
3	Azerbaijan (H)	3	1	1	1	2	6	−4	4	
4	Scotland	3	0	0	3	0	5	−5	0	

Source: UEFA
Rules for classification: Group stage tiebreakers
(H) Hosts
5 May 2016
19:00

Belgium	2–0	Scotland
Corryn 45'; Openda 60'	Report

Bakcell Arena, Baku
Attendance: 150
Referee: Peter Kráľovič (Slovakia)
5 May 2016
20:00

Azerbaijan	0–5	Portugal
	Report	Gomes 4', 16'; Asadov 24' (o.g.); Miguel Luís 44'; Fernandes 76'

Baku Olympic Stadium, Baku
Attendance: 33,000
Referee: Bartosz Frankowski (Poland)

8 May 2016
15:30

Portugal	2–0	Scotland
Quina 37'; Gomes 55'	Report

Dalga Arena, Baku
Attendance: 100
Referee: Gunnar Jarl Jónsson (Iceland)
8 May 2016
19:00

Azerbaijan	1–1	Belgium
Mahmudov 77'	Report	Bongiovanni 72'

Bakcell Arena, Baku
Attendance: 1,500
Referee: Petr Ardeleánu (Czech Republic)

11 May 2016
16:00

Scotland	0–1	Azerbaijan
	Report	Nabiyev 79'

Bakcell Arena, Baku
Attendance: 3,000
Referee: Svein-Erik Edvartsen (Norway)
11 May 2016
16:00

Portugal	0–0	Belgium
	Report

Dalga Arena, Baku
Attendance: 80
Referee: Ville Nevalainen (Finland)

=== Group B ===
Pos	Team	Pld	W	D	L	GF	GA	GD	Pts	Qualification
1	Germany	3	2	1	0	9	3	+6	7	Knockout stage
2	Austria	3	2	0	1	4	4	0	6	Knockout stage
3	Bosnia and Herzegovina	3	1	0	2	3	6	−3	3	
4	Ukraine	3	0	1	2	3	6	−3	1	

Source: UEFA
Rules for classification: Group stage tiebreakers
5 May 2016
14:00

Austria	2–0	Bosnia and Herzegovina
Baumgartner 18', 35'	Report

Bakcell Arena, Baku
Attendance: 150
Referee: Petr Ardeleánu (Czech Republic)
5 May 2016
17:00

Ukraine	2–2	Germany
Yanakov 33'; Buletsa 67'	Report	Otto 37'; Schreck 74'

Baku Olympic Stadium, Baku
Attendance: 8,000
Referee: Gunnar Jarl Jónsson (Iceland)

8 May 2016
14:00

Ukraine	0–2	Austria
	Report	Schmid 7'; V. Müller 21'

Bakcell Arena, Baku
Attendance: 200
Referee: Svein-Erik Edvartsen (Norway)
8 May 2016
19:00

Germany	3–1	Bosnia and Herzegovina
Akkaynak 17' (pen.); Otto 66', 72'	Report	Baack 2' (o.g.)

Dalga Arena, Baku
Attendance: 190
Referee: Peter Kráľovič (Slovakia)

11 May 2016
19:15

Bosnia and Herzegovina	2–1	Ukraine
B. Hadžić 38', 41'	Report	Kulakov 69'

Bakcell Arena, Baku
Attendance: 150
Referee: Fran Jović (Croatia)
11 May 2016
19:15

Germany	4–0	Austria
Meisl 3' (o.g.); Akkaynak 25'; Havertz 32'; Dadashov 81'	Report

Dalga Arena, Baku
Attendance: 200
Referee: Mitja Žganec (Slovenia)

=== Group C ===
Pos	Team	Pld	W	D	L	GF	GA	GD	Pts	Qualification
1	Sweden	3	2	0	1	3	2	+1	6	Knockout stage
2	England	3	2	0	1	6	3	+3	6	Knockout stage
3	Denmark	3	1	1	1	2	3	−1	4	
4	France	3	0	1	2	0	3	−3	1	

Source: UEFA
Rules for classification: Group stage tiebreakers
6 May 2016
19:00

France	0–0	Denmark
	Report

Dalga Arena, Baku
Attendance: 200
Referee: Ville Nevalainen (Finland)
6 May 2016
19:00

England	1–2	Sweden
Nelson 62'	Report	Asoro 4', 59'

Azersun Arena, Baku
Attendance: 250
Referee: Svein-Erik Edvartsen (Norway)

9 May 2016
14:00

Denmark	1–0	Sweden
Buch Jensen 83'	Report

Baku Olympic Stadium, Baku
Attendance: 130
Referee: Mitja Žganec (Slovenia)
9 May 2016
20:00

France	0–2	England
	Report	Morris 15'; Nelson 43' (pen.)

Azersun Arena, Baku
Attendance: 1,200
Referee: Fran Jović (Croatia)

12 May 2016
19:00

Sweden	1–0	France
Bergqvist 45'	Report

Azersun Arena, Baku
Attendance: 700
Referee: Bartosz Frankowski (Poland)
12 May 2016
19:00

Denmark	1–3	England
Odgaard 81'	Report	Nelson 30'; Mount 51'; Hirst 78'

Baku Olympic Stadium, Baku
Attendance: 100
Referee: Peter Kráľovič (Slovakia)

=== Group D ===
Pos	Team	Pld	W	D	L	GF	GA	GD	Pts	Qualification
1	Spain	3	2	1	0	7	3	+4	7	Knockout stage
2	Netherlands	3	2	0	1	3	2	+1	6	Knockout stage
3	Italy	3	1	0	2	4	6	−2	3	
4	Serbia	3	0	1	2	2	5	−3	1	

Source: UEFA
Rules for classification: Group stage tiebreakers
6 May 2016
14:00

Italy	2–1	Serbia
Scamacca 9'; Kean 32'	Report	Maksimović 77'

Azersun Arena, Baku
Attendance: 100
Referee: Mitja Žganec (Slovenia)
6 May 2016
15:30

Netherlands	0–2	Spain
	Report	Mboula 16'; Ruiz 52'

Dalga Arena, Baku
Attendance: 200
Referee: Fran Jović (Croatia)

9 May 2016
16:00

Italy	0–1	Netherlands
	Report	Nunnely 78'

Azersun Arena, Baku
Attendance: 600
Referee: Bartosz Frankowski (Poland)
9 May 2016
17:00

Serbia	1–1	Spain
Joveljić 59' (pen.)	Report	Ruiz 4'

Baku Olympic Stadium, Baku
Attendance: 128
Referee: Ville Nevalainen (Finland)

12 May 2016
14:00

Spain	4–2	Italy
Díaz 44'; García 59'; Ruiz 76'; Lozano 81'	Report	Olivieri 65' (pen.); Pinamonti 72'

Azersun Arena, Baku
Attendance: 270
Referee: Petr Ardeleánu (Czech Republic)
12 May 2016
14:00

Serbia	0–2	Netherlands
	Report	M. Ilić 72' (o.g.); Vente 81'

Baku Olympic Stadium, Baku
Attendance: 100
Referee: Gunnar Jarl Jónsson (Iceland)

== Knockout stage ==
In the knockout stage, a penalty shoot-out was used to decide the winner if necessary (no extra time was played).

Following a consultation between the Association of Football Federations of Azerbaijan (AFFA) and UEFA, it was decided to change the venue for the semi-finals and final from the Baku Olympic Stadium to the Dalga Arena and Bakcell Arena, respectively.

=== Bracket ===
Quarter-finals
14 May – Baku
Portugal	5
Austria	0
15 May – Baku
Sweden	0
Netherlands	1
14 May – Baku
Germany	1
Belgium	0
15 May – Baku
Spain	1
England	0

Semi-finals
18 May – Baku
Portugal	2
Netherlands	0
18 May – Baku
Germany	1
Spain	2

Final
21 May – Baku
Portugal (p)	1 (5)
Spain	1 (4)

=== Quarter-finals ===
14 May 2016
15:00

Portugal	5–0	Austria
Gomes 7' (pen.), 18', 47'; Djú 51'; Miguel Luís 77'	Report

Dalga Arena, Baku
Attendance: 200
Referee: Fran Jović (Croatia)

14 May 2016
20:00

Germany	1–0	Belgium
Dadashov 46'	Report

Dalga Arena, Baku
Attendance: 300
Referee: Gunnar Jarl Jónsson (Iceland)

15 May 2016
16:00

Spain	1–0	England
García 11'	Report

Bakcell Arena, Baku
Attendance: 1,000
Referee: Svein-Erik Edvartsen (Norway)

15 May 2016
20:00

Sweden	0–1	Netherlands
	Report	Chong 62'

Bakcell Arena, Baku
Attendance: 500
Referee: Ville Nevalainen (Finland)

=== Semi-finals ===
18 May 2016
15:00

Portugal	2–0	Netherlands
Gomes 25'; Dalot 56'	Report

Dalga Arena, Baku
Attendance: 730
Referee: Peter Kráľovič (Slovakia)

18 May 2016
20:00

Germany	1–2	Spain
Dadashov 11'	Report	Ruiz 64'; Díaz 78'

Dalga Arena, Baku
Attendance: 925
Referee: Bartosz Frankowski (Poland)

=== Final ===
21 May 2016
20:00

Portugal	1–1	Spain
Dalot 27'	Report	Díaz 32'
Penalties
Gomes (penalty scored); Jota (penalty scored); Leite (penalty scored); Dalot (penalty scored); Fernandes (penalty scored)	5–4	(penalty scored) Ruiz; (penalty scored) Busquets; (penalty scored) Chumi; (penalty scored) Díaz; (penalty missed) Morlanes

Bakcell Arena, Baku
Attendance: 7,253
Referee: Petr Ardeleánu (Czech Republic)

== Goalscorers ==
7 goals

- (Portugal) José Gomes

Note: José Gomes scored a total of 16 goals in the 2014–15 and 2015–16 season (including qualifying), making him the competition's all-time top scorer.

4 goals

- (Spain) Abel Ruiz

3 goals

- (England) Reiss Nelson
- (Germany) Renat Dadashov
- (Germany) Yari Otto
- (Spain) Brahim Díaz

2 goals

- (Austria) Christoph Baumgartner
- (Bosnia and Herzegovina) Benjamin Hadžić
- (Germany) Atakan Akkaynak
- (Portugal) Diogo Dalot
- (Portugal) Miguel Luís
- (Spain) Fran García
- (Sweden) Joel Asoro

1 goal

- (Austria) Valentino Müller
- (Austria) Romano Schmid
- (Azerbaijan) Murad Mahmudov
- (Azerbaijan) Farid Nabiyev
- (Belgium) Adrien Bongiovanni
- (Belgium) Milan Corryn
- (Belgium) Loïs Openda
- (Denmark) Sebastian Buch Jensen
- (Denmark) Jens Odgaard
- (England) George Hirst
- (England) Ben Morris
- (England) Mason Mount
- (Germany) Kai Havertz
- (Germany) Sam Schreck
- (Italy) Moise Kean
- (Italy) Marco Olivieri
- (Italy) Andrea Pinamonti
- (Italy) Gianluca Scamacca
- (Netherlands) Tahith Chong
- (Netherlands) Ché Nunnely
- (Netherlands) Dylan Vente
- (Portugal) Mesaque Djú
- (Portugal) Gedson Fernandes
- (Portugal) Domingos Quina
- (Serbia) Dejan Joveljić
- (Serbia) Igor Maksimović
- (Spain) Pol Lozano
- (Spain) Jordi Mboula
- (Sweden) Teddy Bergqvist
- (Ukraine) Serhiy Buletsa
- (Ukraine) Andriy Kulakov
- (Ukraine) Denys Yanakov

1 own goal

- (Austria) Luca Meisl (playing against Germany)
- (Azerbaijan) Elchin Asadov (playing against Portugal)
- (Germany) Tom Baack (playing against Bosnia and Herzegovina)
- (Serbia) Marko Ilić (playing against Netherlands)

Source: UEFA.com

== Team of the Tournament ==
Goalkeepers

- (Portugal) Diogo Costa
- (Spain) Iñaki Peña

Defenders

- (England) Dujon Sterling
- (France) Dan-Axel Zagadou
- (Netherlands) Matthijs de Ligt
- (Portugal) Diogo Dalot
- (Portugal) Diogo Leite
- (Portugal) Rúben Vinagre

Midfielders

- (Germany) Kai Havertz
- (Portugal) Gedson Fernandes
- (Portugal) Florentino
- (Portugal) Quina
- (Spain) Brahim Díaz
- (Spain) Manu Morlanes

Forwards

- (England) Reiss Nelson
- (Netherlands) Tahith Chong
- (Portugal) Jota
- (Portugal) José Gomes

Source: UEFA Technical Report
