= Kazakhstan President Cup (football) =

- Founded: 2008
- Region: International (FIFA)
- Teams: 6-8
- Current champions: Kazakhstan U-17 (3-rd title)
- Most championships: Kazakhstan U-17 (3 titles)
- Broadcaster(s): KAZsport
- Website: presidentcup.kz Archived 2015-06-26 at the Wayback Machine
- 2019

Kazakhstan President Cup (Kazakh: Қазақстан Республикасы Президентінің Кубогы, romanized: Qazaqstan Respublikasy Prezidentınıñ Kubogy; Russian: Кубок Президента Республики Казахстан) is an annual international U-17 football tournament held under the aegis of the Football Federation of Kazakhstan and FIFA. The first edition took place in April 2008.

== Format ==
The tournament is held in two stages. At the first stage, six or eight teams are divided into two qualification groups (A and B). Competitions of the first stage were held on circular system. The winners of the groups advance to the final, while the group runners-up meet to determine third place.

== About the tournament ==
The tournament was established in order to further the development of football in Kazakhstan, including improving the quality and effectiveness of children’s sports schools; promote football among fans, the public and the media; improving the skills of youth players; and developing and strengthening international relations among the participants.

All matches of the 2015 edition will be broadcast on national television channel KAZsport.

== Prize fund ==
According to FFK, the prize fund of a tournament will make 15,000 $. "The teams which took 1, 2 and 3 place will be received, respectively 7,000, 5,000 and 3,000 $.

== Participants of a tournament ==
Participantions	Club/National team	Country	Winners	Runners-up
9	Kazakhstan U-17		3	0
7	Azerbaijan U-17		1	2
7	Kyrgyzstan U-17		0	0
6	Georgia U-17		0	2
6	Tajikistan U-17		0	2
4	Iran U-17		1	1
3	Armenia U-17		0	0
3	CSKA U-17	Russia	0	2
3	Russia U-17		1	0
2	ADO Den Haag U-17	Netherlands	0	0
2	Albania U-17		0	0
2	Kazakhstan U-16		0	0
2	Lithuania U-17		0	0
2	Ole Brasil U-17	Brazil	1	0
2	Spain U-17		2	0
2	Spartak U-17	Russia	0	0
2	Tsesna U-17	Kazakhstan	0	0
2	Turkey U-17		0	0
2	Uzbekistan U-17		0	0
2	Zenit U-17	Russia	0	1
1	Abdysh Ata U-17	Kyrgyzstan	0	0
1	Academy	Azerbaijan	0	0
1	Baku U-17	Azerbaijan	0	0
1	Belarus U-17		0	0
1	Besiktas U-17	Turkey	1	0
1	Botafogo U-17	Brazil	0	0
1	Bunyodkor U-17	Uzbekistan	0	0
1	China U-17		0	0
1	Cruzeiro-Kazakhstan	Brazil	0	0
1	Dinamo U-17	Belarus	0	0
1	Galatasaray U-17	Turkey	0	0
1	Hungary U-17		0	1
1	Krasnodar U-17	Russia	1	0
1	Rubin U-17	Russia	0	0
1	Semey-93	Kazakhstan	0	0
1	Serbia U-17		1	0
1	Turkmenistan U-17		0	0
1	Ukraine U-17		0	1
1	Xinjiang Sport Lottery	China	0	0

== Finals ==
Year	Winners	Runners-up	Score	Stadium	Attendance
2008	Turkey Besiktas (U-17)	Russia CSKA (U-17)	3–1	Almaty, Central Stadium	16,000
2009	Brazil Ole Brasil (U-17)	Russia CSKA (U-17)	1–0	Almaty, Central Stadium	
2010	Serbia (U-17)	Russia Zenit (U-17)	7–0	Astana, Astana Arena	
2011	Azerbaijan (U-17)	Ukraine (U-17)	0–0 (5–4 p)	Astana, Astana Arena	
2012	Iran (U-17)	Hungary (U-17)	3–1	Almaty, Central Stadium	2,000
2013	Kazakhstan (U-17)	Iran (U-17)	1–0	Astana, Astana Arena	5,000
2014	Spain (U-17)	Georgia (U-17)	6–1	Astana, Astana Arena	1,500
2015	Spain (U-17)	Azerbaijan (U-17)	1–1 (4–1 p)	Astana, Astana Arena	
2016	Kazakhstan (U-17)	Tajikistan (U-17)	2–1	Shymkent, Kazhymukan Munaitpasov Stadium	10,000
2017	Russia (U-17)	Georgia (U-17)	1–1 (5–4 p)	Almaty, Central Stadium	2,000
2018	Russia Krasnodar (U-17)	Azerbaijan (U-17)	0–0 (3–0 p)	Talgar, STB	
2019	Kazakhstan (U-17)	Tajikistan (U-17)	3–0	Nur-Sultan, Futbol Uyi Sportscomplex	300

== Performance by countries ==
Country	Winners	Finals	Wins	Finalists
Kazakhstan	3	–	Kazakhstan (U-17) (3)	–
Russia	2	3	Russia (U-17) (1), Krasnodar (U-17) (1)	CSKA (U-17) (2), Zenit (U-17) (1)
Spain	2	–	Spain (U-17) (2)	
Azerbaijan	1	2	Azerbaijan (U-17) (1)	Azerbaijan (U-17) (2)
Iran	1	1	Iran (U-17) (1)	Iran (U-17) (1)
Brazil	1	–	Ole Brasil (U-17) (1)	–
Serbia	1	–	Serbia (U-17) (1)	–
Turkey	1	–	Besiktas (U-17) (1)	–
Georgia	–	2	–	Georgia (U-17) (2)
Tajikistan	–	2	–	Tajikistan (U-17) (2)
Hungary	–	1	–	Hungary (U-17) (1)
Ukraine	–	1	–	Ukraine (U-17) (1)
