= Tabriz Hasanov =

Azerbaijani footballer (born 1967)

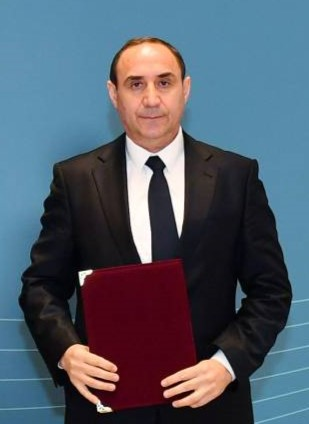

Personal information
- Full name: Tabriz Hasanov
- Date of birth: 15 June 1967 (age 59)
- Place of birth: Baku, Azerbaijan SSR

Senior career*
Years	Team	Apps	(Gls)
1985–1986	Neftchi Baku		
1988–1989	Termists Baku		
1990–1991	Göyazan		
1991–1992	Neftchi Baku		
1993–1999	Qarabağ		
1999–2000	ANS Pivani Baku		
2000–2001	Qarabağ		

Managerial career
- 2007–2008: Karvan
- 2009: Azerbaijan U15
- 2010: Azerbaijan U16
- 2011–2012: Azerbaijan U17
- 2013: Azerbaijan U15
- 2014: Azerbaijan U16
- 2015–2016: Azerbaijan U17
- 2017: Azerbaijan U19
- * Club domestic league appearances and goals

Tabriz Hasanov (Azerbaijani: Təbriz Həsənov, born 15 June 1967) is a retired Azerbaijani footballer.

== Club career ==
Tabriz Hasanov made his professional debut in the Soviet Top League in 1985 for Neftchi Baku.

He played as a professional football player for Neftchi Baku, Termists PFC Baku, Göyazan, Qarabağ and ANS Pivani Baku.

== Managerial career ==
He began his coaching career in 2001. He worked as coach-assistant of U-21 national team in 2004–2006, Karvan in 2004–2007, as a head coach of Karvan, Azerbaijan U-15 national team, Azerbaijan U-16 national team and Azerbaijan U-17 national team. On 7 April 2015, he was appointed as a head coach of Azerbaijan U17 to replace Mirbaghir Isayev.

Hasanov got "B" category coach license in 2004, and "A" category in 2005. He is "UEFA Pro" category coach since 2012.
