= Kazakhstan Football Federation =

Association football governing body of Kazakhstan

UEFA
- Founded: 1914; 112 years ago 1992; 34 years ago
- Headquarters: Astana
- FIFA affiliation: 1994
- UEFA affiliation: 25 April 2002; 24 years ago
- President: Marat Omarov
- Website: http://www.kff.kz/

The Kazakhstan Football Federation (KFF; Kazakh: Қазақстанның Футбол Федерациясы, romanized: Qazaqstannyñ Futbol Federatsiasy; Russian: Федерация Футбола Казахстана, romanized: Federatsiya Futbola Kazakhstana) is the governing body of football in Kazakhstan. It organizes the football league, the Kazakhstan Premier League, and the Kazakhstan national football team / Kazakhstan women's national football team. It is based in Astana.

== Previous names ==
- Football Association of the Republic of Kazakhstan (1992–2000)
- Football Union of Kazakhstan (2000–2007)
- Kazakhstan Football Federation (2007–present)

== History ==
The Kazakhstan Football Federation (KFF) was founded in 1992 with the reorganization of the Soviet Republican Football Association of the Kazakh SSR (created in 1989). The same year (1992), KFF became an associate member of FIFA and the Asian Football Confederation (AFC) (or in 1993). Its foundation marked the beginning of organising the Kazakh football according to international standards. KFF has developed into the biggest sport federation of the country, football in Kazakhstan being regarded as the "king of sports", occupying first place in sport fans' preferences.

In 1992, the federation conducted various professional level competitions, such as the national league championship and the cup. While being an associate member, KFF was not permitted to participate in official international competitions for national teams, therefore in mid to late 1992 and April 1994 it participated in regional competitions along with its former Central Asian companions of the Soviet Union from Uzbekistan, Kyrgyzstan, Tajikistan, and Turkmenistan. In 1994, KFF was finally accepted as a full member of FIFA and the AFC. The decision to join the AFC was taken after a vote. The first national team match with a team outside Central Asia took place in December 1995. The same year Oleg Litvinenko, representing Kazakhstan, was recognized as the best Asian player (for the month of October).

In 2000, KFF became a candidate member of UEFA, and obtained its full membership on 25 April 2002 at the UEFA Congress in Stockholm, Sweden.

In 2008, the federation established a major U-17 tournament, the Kazakhstan President Cup. Spain won it in 2014 and 2015.

== List of presidents ==
- Adilbek Zhaksybekov (2007–2014)
- Erlan Kozhagapanov (2014–2016)
- Seilda Baishakov (2016–2018)
- Adilbek Zhaksybekov (2018–2022)
- Adlet Barmenkulov (2022–2024)
- Marat Talgatovich Omarov (2024–present)

== See also ==
- Football in Kazakhstan
