= Eero Hyökyvirta =

Finnish footballer (born 1999)

Personal information
- Date of birth: 17 March 1999 (age 27)
- Position: Midfielder

Senior career*
Years	Team	Apps	(Gls)
2015–2016	Klubi 04	23	(1)
2017	HIFK	0	(0)
2017	→ Gnistan (loan)	18	(0)
2018	Ilves	10	(0)
2018	→ JJK (loan)	3	(0)
- * Club domestic league appearances and goals as of 4 April 2024

Eero Hyökyvirta (born 17 March 1999) is a Finnish former professional footballer who played as a midfielder. He announced his retirement in August 2018, during the season. Hyökyvirta had made ten appearances in Veikkausliiga with Ilves.
