= Ervin Taha =

French footballer (born 1999)

Personal information
- Date of birth: 14 March 1999 (age 27)
- Place of birth: Paris, France
- Height: 1.74 m (5 ft 9 in)
- Position: Forward

Team information
- Current team: Al-Fujairah
- Number: 7

Youth career
- 2006–2012: L'Entente SSG
- 2012–2017: Bordeaux

Senior career*
Years	Team	Apps	(Gls)
2017–2019	Bordeaux B	30	(5)
2017–2019	Bordeaux	2	(0)
2019–2022	Guingamp B	32	(10)
2020–2022	Guingamp	5	(0)
2020–2021	→ Laval (loan)	17	(2)
2022	→ Créteil B (loan)	2	(0)
2022	→ Créteil (loan)	11	(2)
2022–2023	Nancy	7	(1)
2022–2023	Nancy B	5	(1)
2023–2024	Les Herbiers	20	(1)
2024–2025	Bourges Foot 18	9	(2)
2025–	Al-Fujairah	0	(0)

International career
2015–2016	France U17	12	(3)
2018	France U19	1	(0)
- * Club domestic league appearances and goals as of 7 December 2024

Ervin Taha (born 14 March 1999) is a French professional footballer who plays as forward for Al-Fujairah.

== Club career ==
Taha developed through the Girondins de Bordeaux academy. He made his Ligue 1 debut for the club on 28 November 2017 against Saint-Étienne coming on for Jonathan Cafú in the 81st minute of a 3–0 home win.

In June 2019 Taha joined the reserves of Guingamp. After making three Ligue 2 appearances for the club, he signed a three-year professional contract with Guingamp on 29 May 2020.

On 27 November 2020, Taha joined Laval on loan until the end of the 2020–21 season, in order to get playing time.

On 1 February 2022, Taha moved on loan to Créteil.

On 13 September 2023, Taha signed with Les Herbiers.

== International career ==
Born in France, Taha is of Ivorian descent. He is a youth international for France.
