= Duje Javorčić =

Croatian footballer

Personal information
- Full name: Duje Javorčić
- Date of birth: 25 November 1999 (age 26)
- Place of birth: Split, Croatia
- Height: 1.83 m (6 ft 0 in)
- Position: Midfielder

Team information
- Current team: Primorac Stobreč

Youth career
- –2014: Hajduk Split
- 2014–2016: RNK Split
- 2016–2018: Lazio

Senior career*
Years	Team	Apps	(Gls)
2017	Lazio	0	(0)
2018−2020	Amiens B	14	(2)
2020	Nitra	4	(0)
2020−2022	Dugopolje	53	(3)
2023	Rudar Pljevlja	17	(0)
2023	RNK Split	12	(0)
2024−	Primorac Stobreč	49	(39)

International career^{‡}
2015	Croatia U16	1	(0)
2015–2016	Croatia U17	6	(4)
2016–2017	Croatia U19	6	(1)
- * Club domestic league appearances and goals as of 22 August 2026 ‡ National team caps and goals as of 14 November 2017

Duje Javorčić (born 25 November 1999) is a Croatian professional footballer who plays as a midfielder for Primorac Stobreč.

== Club career ==
=== FC Nitra ===
Javorčić made his Slovak First Football League debut for Nitra against Pohronie on 15 February 2020. He started the match in the starting-XI of Anatoliy Demyanenko, but was replaced by Ugandan international Isaac Muleme after over 80 minutes due to an injury. In the match, Javorčić was booked with a yellow card. The fixture concluded in a goal-less tie.
