= Juho Montola =

Finnish footballer (born 1999)

Personal information
- Date of birth: 22 February 1999 (age 27)
- Place of birth: Rusko, Finland
- Height: 1.80 m (5 ft 11 in)
- Position: Centre back

Team information
- Current team: MuSa
- Number: 23

Youth career
- Ruskon Pallo
- TPS

Senior career*
Years	Team	Apps	(Gls)
2015–2018	TPS	21	(0)
2016	→ SalPa (loan)	2	(0)
2018	→ SalPa (loan)	15	(1)
2019–	MuSa	6	(2)
- * Club domestic league appearances and goals as of 22:37, 25 June 2019 (UTC)

Juho Montola (born 22 February 1999) is a Finnish professional footballer who plays for MuSa, as a defender.
