= 2021 UEFA European Under-17 Championship =

Ευρωπαϊκό πρωτάθλημα ποδοσφαίρου Παίδων 2021 2021 Avrupa 17 Yaş Altı Futbol Şampiyonası

Tournament details
- Host country: Cyprus
- Dates: Cancelled (originally 6–22 May)
- Teams: 16 (from 1 confederation)
- Venue: TBC (in TBC host cities)

The 2021 UEFA European Under-17 Championship (also known as UEFA Under-17 Euro 2021) was originally to be held as the 19th edition of the UEFA European Under-17 Championship (38th edition if the Under-16 era is also included), the annual international youth football championship organised by UEFA for the men's under-17 national teams of Europe. The tournament should have been held in Cyprus between 6 and 22 May 2021. A total of 16 teams were scheduled to play in the tournament, with players born on or after 1 January 2004 eligible to participate.

The Netherlands were the two-time defending champions, having won the last two tournaments held in 2018 and 2019, with the 2020 edition cancelled due to the COVID-19 pandemic in Europe.

On 18 December 2020, the UEFA Executive Committee announced that the tournament was cancelled after consultation with all 55 member associations due to the COVID-19 pandemic in Europe.

== Host selection ==
The timeline of host selection was as follows:

- 11 January 2019: bidding procedure launched
- 28 February 2019: deadline to express interest
- 27 March 2019: Announcement by UEFA that declaration of interest were received from 17 member associations to host one of the UEFA national team youth final tournaments (UEFA European Under-19 Championship, UEFA Women's Under-19 Championship, UEFA European Under-17 Championship, UEFA Women's Under-17 Championship) in 2021 and 2022 (although it was not specified which association were interested in which tournament)
- 28 June 2019: Submission of bid dossiers
- 24 September 2019: Selection of successful host associations by the UEFA Executive Committee at its meeting in Ljubljana

For the UEFA European Under-17 Championship final tournaments of 2021 and 2022, Cyprus and Israel were selected as hosts respectively.

== Qualification ==
All 55 UEFA nations entered the competition, and with the hosts Cyprus qualifying automatically, the original format would have seen the other 54 teams competing in the qualifying competition, which would have consisted of two rounds: Qualifying round, which would have taken place in autumn 2020, and Elite round, which would have also taken place in spring 2021, to determine the remaining 15 spots in the final tournament. However, due to the COVID-19 pandemic in Europe, UEFA announced on 13 August 2020 that after consultation with the 55 member associations, the qualifying round was delayed to March 2021, and the elite round was abolished, with the 13 qualifying round group winners and the top two seeds by coefficient ranking, Netherlands and Spain (which originally would receive byes to the elite round) qualifying for the final tournament.

=== Qualified teams ===
The following teams qualified for the final tournament.

Note: All appearance statistics include only U-17 era (since 2002).

Team	Method of qualification	Appearance	Last appearance	Previous best performance
Cyprus	Hosts	1st	—	Debut
Netherlands	1st seed by coefficient ranking	14th	2019 (champions)	Champions (2011, 2012, 2018, 2019)
Spain	2nd seed by coefficient ranking	14th	2019 (semi-finals)	Champions (2007, 2008, 2017)
N/A	Qualifying round Group 1 winners			
N/A	Qualifying round Group 2 winners			
N/A	Qualifying round Group 3 winners			
N/A	Qualifying round Group 4 winners			
N/A	Qualifying round Group 5 winners			
N/A	Qualifying round Group 6 winners			
N/A	Qualifying round Group 7 winners			
N/A	Qualifying round Group 8 winners			
N/A	Qualifying round Group 9 winners			
N/A	Qualifying round Group 10 winners			
N/A	Qualifying round Group 11 winners			
N/A	Qualifying round Group 12 winners			
N/A	Qualifying round Group 13 winners			
