= Edis Smajić =

Bosnian footballer

Personal information
- Full name: Edis Smajić
- Date of birth: 10 September 1999 (age 27)
- Place of birth: Tuzla, Bosnia and Herzegovina
- Height: 1.79 m (5 ft 10 1/2 in)
- Position: Attacking midfielder

Team information
- Current team: Cibalia
- Number: 11

Youth career
- –2016: Sloboda Tuzla

Senior career*
Years	Team	Apps	(Gls)
2016–2020	Sloboda Tuzla	75	(8)
2020–2021	Vis Simm-Bau	7	(2)

International career
2015–2016	Bosnia and Herzegovina U17	6	(2)
2017–2018	Bosnia and Herzegovina U19	5	(0)
2018	Bosnia and Herzegovina U21	1	(0)
- * Club domestic league appearances and goals as of 14 November 2020

Edis Smajić (born 10 September 1999) is a Bosnian professional footballer who plays as an attacking midfielder for Croatian second tier-club Cibalia.

== Club career ==
=== Sloboda Tuzla ===
Smajić made his league debut for hometown club Sloboda Tuzla on 18 September 2016, coming on as a 90th-minute substitute in a 0–0 draw with Metalleghe-BSI. Nearly four years after his debut, on 27 June 2020, Smajić left Sloboda after his contract with the club expired.

=== VIS Simm-Bau ===
On 21 August 2020, Smajić signed a contract with First League of FBiH club Vis Simm-Bau. He made his official debut for Vis Simm-Bau on 5 September 2020 in a league match against Rudar Kakanj. Smajić scored his first goal for the club in a league game against Jedinstvo Bihać on 31 October 2020.

== International career ==
Smajić has played for Bosnia and Herzegovina at under-17 and under-19 level. On 28 May 2018, he made his debut for the under-21 side, coming on as an 81st-minute substitute in a 2–0 win over Albania.
