= Atakan Akkaynak =

German footballer

Personal information
- Date of birth: 5 January 1999 (age 27)
- Place of birth: Troisdorf, Germany
- Height: 1.80 m (5 ft 11 in)
- Position: Midfielder

Team information
- Current team: Çorum FK
- Number: 8

Youth career
- –2018: Bayer Leverkusen

Senior career*
Years	Team	Apps	(Gls)
2018–2020	Willem II	8	(1)
2019–2020	→ Çaykur Rizespor (loan)	4	(0)
2020–2021	Çaykur Rizespor	0	(0)
2020–2021	→ Türkgücü München (loan)	9	(0)
2021–	Çorum FK	149	(14)

International career
2014–2015	Germany U16	8	(2)
2015–2016	Germany U17	12	(3)
2017	Germany U18	3	(1)
2017–2018	Germany U19	7	(2)
- * Club domestic league appearances and goals as of 5 May 2026

Atakan Akkaynak (born 5 January 1999) is a German professional footballer who plays as a midfielder for Çorum FK.

== Club career ==
Akkaynak was at Bayer 04 Leverkusen before signing a three-year contract with Willem II in June 2018.

He made his Eredivisie debut on 17 August 2018, appearing as a substitute against Groningen.

== International career ==
Akkaynak has represented Germany at Under-19 level having captained their U18 and U17 sides. He is also eligible for Turkey because of his descent (he also holds Turkish citizenship).
