= Martin Vician =

Slovak footballer (born 1999)

Personal information
- Date of birth: 11 January 1999 (age 27)
- Place of birth: Slovakia
- Height: 1.92 m (6 ft 4 in)
- Positions: Midfielder; striker

Youth career
- –2017: Slovan Bratislava
- 2017–2018: Baník Ostrava

College career
Years	Team	Apps	(Gls)
2019–2022	Harvard Crimson	35	(15)
2023–2024	North Carolina Tar Heels	22	(10)

Senior career*
Years	Team	Apps	(Gls)
2018–2020	Petržalka	35	(5)
- * Club domestic league appearances and goals

Martin Vician (born 11 January 1999) is a Slovak footballer. He played as a midfielder or striker for North Carolina Tar Heels.

== Early life ==
Vician was born in 1999 in Slovakia. He started playing football at the age of five.

== Career ==
Vician joined the youth academy of Czech side Baník at the age of eighteen. He suffered an injury while playing for the club. In 2018, he signed for Slovak side Petržalka.

== Personal life ==
Vician attended the Evangelical Lyceum in Slovakia. He has an older brother.
