= José Gomes (footballer, born 1999) =

Portuguese footballer

Personal information
- Full name: José Gomes
- Date of birth: 8 April 1999 (age 27)
- Place of birth: Bissau, Guinea-Bissau
- Height: 1.78 m (5 ft 10 in)
- Position: Striker

Team information
- Current team: Elbasani
- Number: 23

Youth career
- 2012–2018: Benfica

Senior career*
Years	Team	Apps	(Gls)
2016–2021	Benfica B	78	(13)
2016–2021	Benfica	3	(0)
2019–2020	→ Portimonense (loan)	1	(0)
2020	→ Lechia Gdańsk (loan)	12	(1)
2021	Cherno More	30	(4)
2022	Seregno	11	(3)
2022–2023	CFR Cluj	0	(0)
2023	→ Universitatea Cluj (loan)	16	(1)
2023–2024	Ethnikos Achna	14	(1)
2024	Chornomorets Odesa	9	(0)
2024–	Elbasani	47	(10)

International career
2013	Portugal U15	3	(3)
2013–2014	Portugal U16	3	(1)
2014–2016	Portugal U17	28	(19)
2016–2018	Portugal U19	18	(7)
2017–2019	Portugal U20	13	(2)
Medal record
Men's football
Representing Portugal
UEFA European Under-19 Championship
Winner	2018 Finland
UEFA European Under-17 Championship
Winner	2016 Azerbaijan
- * Club domestic league appearances and goals as of 24 June 2026

José Gomes (born 8 April 1999), known as Zé Gomes, is a professional footballer who plays as a striker for AF Elbasani. Born in Guinea-Bissau, he represented Portugal at youth level.

== Club career ==
Born in Bissau, Gomes, after participating in a 2011 youth tournament in Portugal, returned to the country a year later to join Benfica's youth academy at the age of 13.

Gomes made his professional debut with Benfica B in a 2016–17 LigaPro match against Cova da Piedade on 6 August 2016. 22 days later, he scored his first goal for the reserve team in a 2–1 away win at Vizela. He debuted for the first-team, playing only 128 seconds, in a 2–1 win at Arouca in Primeira Liga on 9 September, becoming Benfica's third youngest player to debut for the main team.

Gomes was loaned to fellow top-flight team Portimonense for 2019–20. Having made only one substitute appearance against Gil Vicente, he headed to Lechia Gdańsk of the Polish Ekstraklasa in February 2020, for the rest of the season. He managed only one goal during his time on the Baltic Sea coast, in a 3–2 loss away to Lech Poznań on 12 July.

On 15 February, Gomes moved to Bulgaria, signing with Cherno More.

On 4 February 2022, Gomes signed with Italian Serie C club Seregno

In January 2023, Gomes joined rivals Universitate Cluj on loan until the end of the season with the option to purchase.

On 22 June 2023, Gomes signed a one-year contract with recently-promoted to Cypriot First Division club Ethnikos Achna.

== International career ==
At the 2016 UEFA European Under-17 Championship, Gomes was crowned both Golden Player and top scorer.

== Club statistics ==
As of 19 August 2023

Club	Season	League			Cup		League Cup		Europe		Other		Total	
Club	Season	Division	Apps	Goals	Apps	Goals	Apps	Goals	Apps	Goals	Apps	Goals	Apps	Goals
Benfica B	2016–17	LigaPro	23	7	—		—		—		—		23	7
Benfica B	2017–18	LigaPro	24	3	—		—		—		—		24	3
Benfica B	2018–19	LigaPro	23	3	—		—		—		—		23	3
Benfica B	2019–20	LigaPro	0	0	—		—		—		—		0	0
Benfica B	2020–21	LigaPro	8	0	—		—		—		—		8	0
Benfica B	Total		78	13	—		—		—		—		78	13
Benfica	2016–17	Primeira Liga	3	0	0	0	0	0	1	0	0	0	4	0
Benfica	Total		3	0	0	0	0	0	1	0	0	0	4	0
Portimonense (loan)	2019–20	Primeira Liga	1	0	—		1	0	—		—		2	0
Lechia Gdańsk (loan)	2019–20	Ekstraklasa	12	1	2	1	—		—		—		14	2
Cherno More	2020–21	First Professional Football League	15	3	1	0	—		—		—		16	3
Cherno More	2021–22	First Professional Football League	16	1	2	1	—		—		—		18	2
Cherno More	Total		31	4	3	1	—		—		—		34	5
Seregno	2021–22	Serie C	11	3	—		—		—		2 (Note: Appearances in Serie C-Relegation play-outs)	0	13	3
CFR Cluj	2022–23	Liga I	0	0	2	0	—		0	0	—		2	0
Universitatea Cluj (loan)	2022–23	Liga I	16	1	2	0	—		—		—		18	1
Ethnikos Achna	2023–24	Cypriot First Division	1	0	0	0	—		—		—		1	0
Career total			153	22	9	2	1	0	1	0	2	0	166	24

== Honours ==
Benfica

- Primeira Liga: 2016–17
- Taça de Portugal: 2016–17

Lechia Gdańsk

- Polish Cup runner-up: 2019–20

Universitatea Cluj

- Cupa României runner-up: 2022–23

Portugal U17

- UEFA European Under-17 Championship: 2016

Portugal U19

- UEFA European Under-19 Championship: 2018

Individual

- 2016 UEFA European Under-17 Championship Top goalscorer (7 goals)
- 2016 UEFA European Under-17 Championship Team of the Tournament
- 2016 UEFA European Under-17 Championship - Golden Player Award
