= 1998 UEFA European Under-16 Championship qualifying =

Football tournament qualification stage

This page describes the qualifying procedure for the 1998 UEFA European Under-16 Football Championship. 49 teams were divided into 15 groups of three and four teams each. The fifteen best winners advanced to the final tournament.

== Matches ==
=== Group 1 ===
Teams	GP	W	D	L	GF	GA	GD	Pts
Spain	2	1	1	0	3	1	2	4
North Macedonia	2	0	2	0	1	1	0	2
Wales	2	0	1	1	2	4	−2	1

4 November 1997	North Macedonia	0–0	Spain	Segovia, Spain
6 November 1997	Wales	1–1	North Macedonia	Segovia, Spain
8 November 1997	Spain	3–1	Wales	Segovia, Spain

=== Group 2 ===
Teams	GP	W	D	L	GF	GA	GD	Pts
Croatia	3	2	1	0	9	1	8	7
England	3	1	2	0	4	2	2	5
Slovakia	3	0	2	1	0	4	−4	2
Bosnia and Herzegovina	3	0	1	2	1	7	−6	1

3 March 1998	Croatia	4–0	Slovakia	Peterborough, England
	England	3–1	Bosnia and Herzegovina	Rushden, England
5 March 1998	Bosnia and Herzegovina	0–0	Slovakia	Northampton, England
	England	1–1	Croatia	Kettering, England
7 March 1998	Bosnia and Herzegovina	0–4	Croatia	Enfield, England
	Slovakia	0–0	England	Northampton, England

=== Group 3 ===
Teams	GP	W	D	L	GF	GA	GD	Pts
Denmark	2	2	0	0	2	0	2	6
Slovenia	2	1	0	1	3	1	2	3
Turkey	2	0	0	2	0	4	−4	0

20 October 1997	Turkey	0–3	Slovenia	Ljubljana, Slovenia
22 October 1997	Denmark	1–0	Turkey	Ljubljana, Slovenia
24 October 1997	Slovenia	0–1	Denmark	Ljubljana, Slovenia

=== Group 4 ===
Teams	GP	W	D	L	GF	GA	GD	Pts
Portugal	2	2	0	0	8	0	+8	6
Austria	2	1	0	1	9	2	+7	3
San Marino	2	0	0	2	1	16	−15	0

1 October 1997	Portugal	7–0	San Marino	Almada, Portugal
3 October 1997	San Marino	1–9	Austria	Seixal, Portugal
5 October 1997	Austria	0–1	Portugal	Almada, Portugal

=== Group 5 ===
Teams	GP	W	D	L	GF	GA	GD	Pts
Italy	2	1	1	0	11	0	11	4
Czech Republic	2	1	1	0	10	0	10	4
Andorra	2	0	0	2	0	21	−21	0

3 March 1998	Czech Republic	10–0	Andorra	Andorra la Vella, Andorra
5 March 1998	Andorra	0–11	Italy	Andorra la Vella, Andorra
7 March 1998	Italy	0–0	Czech Republic	Andorra la Vella, Andorra

=== Group 6 ===
Teams	GP	W	D	L	GF	GA	GD	Pts
Israel	3	2	1	0	9	2	7	7
Germany	3	2	0	1	8	1	7	6
Switzerland	3	1	1	1	5	2	3	4
Moldova	3	0	0	3	1	18	−17	0

24 November 1997	Israel	7–1	Moldova	Dinslaken, Germany
	Switzerland	0–1	Germany	Düsseldorf, Germany
26 November 1997	Germany	7–0	Moldova	Cologne, Germany
	Switzerland	1–1	Israel	Goch, Germany
28 November 1997	Germany	0–1	Israel	Gelsenkirchen, Germany
	Moldova	0–4	Switzerland	Südlohn, Germany

=== Group 7 ===
Teams	GP	W	D	L	GF	GA	GD	Pts
Russia	3	2	1	0	10	3	7	7
Hungary	3	2	1	0	8	1	7	7
FR Yugoslavia	3	1	0	2	6	6	0	3
Armenia	3	0	0	3	1	15	−14	0

22 November 1997	Hungary	0–0	Russia	Békéscsaba, Hungary
	FR Yugoslavia	3–0	Armenia	Békés, Hungary
24 November 1997	Armenia	1–7	Russia	Békés, Hungary
	FR Yugoslavia	1–3	Hungary	Gyula, Hungary
26 November 1997	Armenia	0–5	Hungary	Békéscsaba, Hungary
	Russia	3–2	FR Yugoslavia	Gyula, Hungary

=== Group 8 ===
Teams	GP	W	D	L	GF	GA	GD	Pts
Liechtenstein	2	2	0	0	3	1	2	6
Bulgaria	2	0	1	1	2	3	−1	1
Azerbaijan	2	0	1	1	1	2	−1	1

23 February 1998	Azerbaijan	1–1	Bulgaria	Triesen, Liechtenstein
25 February 1998	Liechtenstein	1–0	Azerbaijan	Triesen, Liechtenstein
27 February 1998	Bulgaria	1–2	Liechtenstein	Triesen, Liechtenstein

=== Group 9 ===
Teams	GP	W	D	L	GF	GA	GD	Pts
Ukraine	4	3	1	0	7	0	7	10
Romania	4	2	1	1	5	2	3	7
Georgia	4	0	0	4	1	11	−10	0

24 September 1997	Romania	4–1	Georgia	Plopeni, Romania
28 September 1997	Ukraine	2–0	Georgia	Boryspil, Ukraine
29 October 1997	Ukraine	0-0	Romania	Boryspil, Ukraine
12 November 1997	Romania	0–1	Ukraine	Plopeni, Romania
27 November 1997	Georgia	0–1	Romania	Tbilisi, Georgia
2 December 1997	Georgia	0–4	Ukraine	Tbilisi, Georgia

=== Group 10 ===
Teams	GP	W	D	L	GF	GA	GD	Pts
Greece	2	2	0	0	6	1	5	6
Cyprus	2	0	1	1	2	3	−1	1
Malta	2	0	1	1	1	5	−4	1

1 March 1998	Greece	2–1	Cyprus	Limassol, Cyprus
3 March 1998	Cyprus	1–1	Malta	Limassol, Cyprus
5 March 1998	Malta	0–4	Greece	Limassol, Cyprus

=== Group 11 ===
Teams	GP	W	D	L	GF	GA	GD	Pts
Sweden	3	2	1	0	8	5	3	7
France	3	2	0	1	9	2	7	6
Lithuania	3	1	1	1	3	5	−2	4
Luxembourg	3	0	0	3	2	10	−8	0

26 October 1997	Sweden	2–2	Lithuania	Thionville, France
	Luxembourg	0–5	France	Pétange, Luxembourg
28 October 1997	France	3–0	Lithuania	Jœuf, France
	Luxembourg	2–4	Sweden	Hobscheid, Luxembourg
30 October 1997	France	1–2	Sweden	Rombas, France
	Lithuania	1–0	Luxembourg	Schieren, Luxembourg

=== Group 12 ===
Teams	GP	W	D	L	GF	GA	GD	Pts
Finland	2	2	0	0	9	1	8	6
Netherlands	2	1	0	1	8	2	6	3
Faroe Islands	2	0	0	2	0	14	−14	0

14 October 1997	Faroe Islands	0–7	Netherlands	Etten-Leur, Netherlands
16 October 1997	Finland	7–0	Faroe Islands	Etten-Leur, Netherlands
18 October 1997	Netherlands	1-2	Finland	Beek en Donk, Netherlands

=== Group 13 ===
Teams	GP	W	D	L	GF	GA	GD	Pts
Iceland	2	1	1	0	6	2	4	4
Poland	2	1	1	0	4	2	2	4
Latvia	2	0	0	2	0	6	−6	0

24 September 1997	Latvia	0–2	Poland	Riga, Latvia
26 September 1997	Poland	2–2	Iceland	Riga, Latvia
28 September 1997	Iceland	4–0	Latvia	Riga, Latvia

=== Group 14 ===
Teams	GP	W	D	L	GF	GA	GD	Pts
Republic of Ireland	2	1	1	0	2	1	1	4
Northern Ireland	2	1	1	0	1	0	1	4
Belgium	2	0	0	2	1	3	−2	0

23 February 1998	Northern Ireland	1–0	Belgium	Portadown, Northern Ireland
25 February 1998	Belgium	1−2	Republic of Ireland	Dungannon, Northern Ireland
27 February 1998	Republic of Ireland	0–0	Northern Ireland	Lurgan, Northern Ireland

=== Group 15 ===
Teams	GP	W	D	L	GF	GA	GD	Pts
Norway	2	2	0	0	8	1	7	6
Belarus	2	1	0	1	6	3	3	3
Estonia	2	0	0	2	0	10	−10	0

14 September 1997	Norway	5–0	Estonia	Tallinn, Estonia
16 September 1997	Belarus	1–3	Norway	Tallinn, Estonia
18 September 1997	Estonia	0–5	Belarus	Tallinn, Estonia
