= 1999 UEFA European Under-16 Championship qualifying =

Football tournament qualification stage

This page describes the qualifying procedure for the 1999 UEFA European Under-16 Football Championship. 49 teams were divided into 15 groups of three and four teams each. The fifteen best winners advanced to the final tournament.

== Matches ==
=== Group 1 ===
Teams	GP	W	D	L	GF	GA	GD	Pts
Portugal	3	3	0	0	8	3	5	9
Italy	3	2	0	1	9	2	7	6
North Macedonia	3	1	0	2	3	7	−4	3
Albania	3	0	0	3	2	10	−8	0

2 March 1999	Albania	1–5	Italy	Ohrid, Republic of Macedonia
	Portugal	3–2	North Macedonia	Ohrid, Republic of Macedonia
4 March 1999	Albania	0–1	North Macedonia	Ohrid, Republic of Macedonia
	Italy	0–1	Portugal	Ohrid, Republic of Macedonia
6 March 1999	Portugal	4–1	Albania	Ohrid, Republic of Macedonia
	Italy	4–0	North Macedonia	Ohrid, Republic of Macedonia

=== Group 2 ===
Teams	GP	W	D	L	GF	GA	GD	Pts
Denmark	2	1	1	0	5	3	2	4
Belgium	2	1	0	1	4	4	0	3
Romania	2	0	1	1	3	5	−2	1

2 November 1998	Denmark	2–2	Romania	Maasmechelen, Belgium
4 November 1998	Belgium	1–3	Denmark	Maasmechelen, Belgium
6 November 1998	Romania	1–3	Belgium	Maasmechelen, Belgium

=== Group 3 ===
Teams	GP	W	D	L	GF	GA	GD	Pts
Israel	2	2	0	0	5	1	4	6
Turkey	2	1	0	1	3	2	1	3
Republic of Ireland	2	0	0	2	0	5	−5	0

16 February 1999	Israel	2–1	Turkey	Herzliya, Israel
18 February 1999	Republic of Ireland	0–3	Israel	Herzliya, Israel
20 February 1999	Turkey	2–0	Republic of Ireland	Netanya, Israel

=== Group 4 ===
Teams	GP	W	D	L	GF	GA	GD	Pts
Slovakia	2	2	0	0	5	2	3	6
Luxembourg	2	1	0	1	3	3	0	3
Bosnia and Herzegovina	2	0	0	2	2	5	−3	0

23 February 1999	Luxembourg	1–2	Slovakia	Diekirch, Luxembourg
25 February 1999	Slovakia	3–1	Bosnia and Herzegovina	Erpeldange, Luxembourg
27 February 1999	Bosnia and Herzegovina	1–2	Luxembourg	Ettelbruck, Luxembourg

=== Group 5 ===
Teams	GP	W	D	L	GF	GA	GD	Pts
Croatia	2	2	0	0	11	0	11	6
Slovenia	2	1	0	1	3	3	0	3
San Marino	2	0	0	2	0	11	−11	0

23 February 1999	Croatia	3–0	Slovenia	Poreč, Croatia
25 February 1999	San Marino	0–3	Slovenia	Poreč, Croatia
27 February 1999	Croatia	8–0	San Marino	Poreč, Croatia

=== Group 6 ===
Teams	GP	W	D	L	GF	GA	GD	Pts
Greece	3	1	2	0	3	0	3	5
Austria	3	1	2	0	3	1	2	5
Georgia	3	1	0	2	1	5	−4	3
Azerbaijan	3	0	2	1	1	2	−1	2

22 October 1998	Georgia	0–2	Austria	Saalfelden, Austria
	Greece	0–0	Azerbaijan	Saalfelden, Austria
24 October 1998	Georgia	0–3	Greece	Saalfelden, Austria
	Azerbaijan	1–1	Austria	Saalfelden, Austria
26 October 1998	Georgia	1–0	Azerbaijan	Saalfelden, Austria
	Greece	0–0	Austria	Saalfelden, Austria

=== Group 7 ===
Teams	GP	W	D	L	GF	GA	GD	Pts
England	2	2	0	0	4	1	3	6
Cyprus	2	1	0	1	5	3	2	3
Armenia	2	0	0	2	2	7	−5	0

22 February 1999	England	2–1	Armenia	Paphos, Cyprus
24 February 1999	Armenia	1–5	Cyprus	Paphos, Cyprus
26 February 1999	Cyprus	0–2	England	Paphos, Cyprus

=== Group 8 ===
Teams	GP	W	D	L	GF	GA	GD	Pts
Spain	2	2	0	0	7	0	7	6
Scotland	2	1	0	1	3	2	1	3
Malta	2	0	0	2	1	9	−8	0

2 March 1999	Malta	1–3	Scotland	Ta'Qali, Malta
4 March 1999	Spain	6–0	Malta	Ta'Qali, Malta
6 March 1999	Scotland	0–1	Spain	Ta'Qali, Malta

=== Group 9 ===
Teams	GP	W	D	L	GF	GA	GD	Pts
Bulgaria	2	1	1	0	4	2	2	4
Hungary	2	1	1	0	4	2	2	4
Moldova	2	0	0	2	2	6	−4	0

19 October 1998	Bulgaria	1–1	Hungary	Burgas, Bulgaria
21 October 1998	Hungary	3–1	Moldova	Burgas, Bulgaria
23 October 1998	Moldova	1–3	Bulgaria	Burgas, Bulgaria

=== Group 10 ===
Teams	GP	W	D	L	GF	GA	GD	Pts
Germany	4	2	2	0	6	2	4	8
Ukraine	4	1	1	2	4	6	−2	4
FR Yugoslavia	4	1	1	2	4	6	−2	4

8 October 1998	Ukraine	1–0	FR Yugoslavia	Boryspil, Ukraine
21 October 1998	Ukraine	0–2	Germany	Boryspil, Ukraine
15 November 1998	FR Yugoslavia	3–2	Ukraine	Belgrade, Yugoslavia
26 November 1998	Germany	2–0	FR Yugoslavia	Saarbrücken, Germany
2 December 1998	FR Yugoslavia	1–1	Germany	Belgrade, Yugoslavia
10 March 1999	Germany	1–1	Ukraine	Grimma, Germany

=== Group 11 ===
Teams	GP	W	D	L	GF	GA	GD	Pts
Finland	3	2	1	0	8	3	5	7
Norway	3	2	0	1	9	4	5	6
Wales	3	1	1	1	5	4	1	4
Faroe Islands	3	0	0	3	1	12	−11	0

8 September 1998	Norway	3–0	Wales	Tórshavn, Faroe Islands
	Faroe Islands	0–4	Finland	Tórshavn, Faroe Islands
10 September 1998	Finland	1–1	Wales	Tórshavn, Faroe Islands
	Norway	4–1	Faroe Islands	Tórshavn, Faroe Islands
12 September 1998	Norway	2–3	Finland	Tórshavn, Faroe Islands
	Wales	4–0	Faroe Islands	Tórshavn, Faroe Islands

=== Group 12 ===
Teams	GP	W	D	L	GF	GA	GD	Pts
Poland	3	2	1	0	4	2	2	7
Netherlands	3	1	1	1	5	2	3	4
Iceland	3	0	3	0	3	3	0	3
Liechtenstein	3	0	1	2	2	7	−5	1

26 October 1998	Iceland	0–0	Netherlands	Łódź, Poland
	Poland	1–0	Liechtenstein	Łódź, Poland
28 October 1998	Netherlands	5–1	Liechtenstein	Łódź, Poland
	Poland	2–2	Iceland	Zgierz, Poland
30 October 1998	Iceland	1–1	Liechtenstein	Łódź, Poland
	Poland	1–0	Netherlands	Zgierz, Poland

=== Group 13 ===
Teams	GP	W	D	L	GF	GA	GD	Pts
Switzerland	4	1	3	0	5	4	1	6
France	4	1	2	1	5	4	1	5
Northern Ireland	4	1	1	2	2	4	−2	4

7 October 1998	Switzerland	3–3	France	Fribourg, Switzerland
9 November 1998	Switzerland	1–0	Northern Ireland	Bülach, Switzerland
12 November 1998	France	2–0	Northern Ireland	Oyonnax, France
18 November 1998	France	0–0	Switzerland	Malesherbes, France
30 November 1998	Northern Ireland	1–1	Switzerland	Belfast, Northern Ireland
3 December 1998	Northern Ireland	1–0	France	Belfast, Northern Ireland

=== Group 14 ===
Teams	GP	W	D	L	GF	GA	GD	Pts
Sweden	2	2	0	0	9	2	7	6
Belarus	2	0	1	1	3	6	−3	1
Latvia	2	0	1	1	1	5	−4	1

5 October 1998	Sweden	4–0	Latvia	Saffle, Sweden
7 October 1998	Latvia	1–1	Belarus	Deje, Sweden
9 October 1998	Belarus	2–5	Sweden	Alvika, Sweden

=== Group 15 ===
Teams	GP	W	D	L	GF	GA	GD	Pts
Russia	2	2	0	0	4	1	3	6
Lithuania	2	1	0	1	4	3	1	3
Estonia	2	0	0	2	0	4	−4	0

28 September 1998	Estonia	0–1	Russia	Tallinn, Estonia
30 September 1998	Russia	3–1	Lithuania	Tallinn, Estonia
2 October 1998	Lithuania	3–0	Estonia	Tallinn, Estonia
