= 2012 UEFA European Under-17 Championship qualifying round =

Football tournament qualification stage

2012 UEFA European Under-17 Football Championship (qualifying round) was the first round of qualifications for the Final Tournament of UEFA U-17 Championship 2012. Matches were played between September 21–November 2, 2011. All times are CET/CEST.

The 52 teams were divided into 13 groups of four teams, with each group being contested as a mini-tournament, hosted by one of the group's teams. After all matches have been played, the 13 group winners and 13 group runners-up advanced to the elite round.

Alongside the 26 winner and runner-up teams, the two best third-placed teams also qualified. These were determined after considering only their results against their group's top two teams, and applying the following criteria in this order:

1. Higher number of points obtained in these matches;
2. Superior goal difference from these matches;
3. Higher number of goals scored in these matches;
4. Fair-play conduct of the teams in all group matches in the qualifying round;
5. Drawing of lots.

== Draw ==
The draw took place at 30 November 2010 in Nyon.

Pot A	Pot B
Spain; England; Switzerland; Netherlands; France; Germany; Turkey; Croatia; Portugal; Czech Republic; Serbia; Greece; Italy; Republic of Ireland; Austria; Belgium; Wales; Romania; Slovakia; Poland; Northern Ireland; Scotland; Hungary; Norway; Sweden; Georgia	Finland; Denmark; Israel; Luxembourg; Russia; Belarus; Bosnia and Herzegovina; Azerbaijan; Ukraine; Estonia; Bulgaria; Cyprus; Iceland; Moldova; Macedonia; Malta; Lithuania; Andorra; Latvia; Faroe Islands; Kazakhstan; Montenegro; Armenia; Albania; Liechtenstein; San Marino

The hosts of each of the mini-tournament is marked in italics.

== Group 1 ==
Team	Pld	W	D	L	GF	GA	GD	Pts
Hungary	3	3	0	0	11	3	+8	9
Belarus	3	2	0	1	9	4	+5	6
Norway	3	1	0	2	5	6	–1	3
Andorra	3	0	0	3	0	12	–12	0

23 September 2011
15:00

Norway	3–0	Andorra
Sakor 15', 29'; Bjerkenes 80+1'	Report

Városi Stadion, Tatabánya
Referee: Alan Mario Sant (Malta)
23 September 2011
15:00

Hungary	4–1	Belarus
Tamás 16' (pen.), 53'; Asztalos 32'; Bobál 80+2'	Report	Rassadkin 71'

Globall Football Park, Telki
Referee: Christof Dierick (Belgium)

25 September 2011
12:00

Norway	0–3	Belarus
	Report	Vodyanovich 11'; Marozaw 38'; Rassadkin 68'

Globall Football Park, Telki
Referee: Neil Doyle (Ireland)
25 September 2011
15:00

Andorra	0–4	Hungary
	Report	Bobál 23'; Asztalos 48'; Tamás 54' (pen.); Farkas 77'

Globall Football Park, Telki
Referee: Christof Dierick (Belgium)

28 September 2011
15:00

Hungary	3–2	Norway
Tamás 27'; Bobál 54', 80+2'	Report	Finne 36'; Dæhl 40+3'

Globall Football Park, Telki
Referee: Alan Mario Sant (Malta)
28 September 2011
15:00

Belarus	5–0	Andorra
Zhurnevich 15'; Marozaw 18'; Rassadkin 30' (pen.); Gribovskiy 60'; Vershitski 69'	Report

Városi Stadion, Tatabánya
Referee: Neil Doyle (Ireland)

== Group 2 ==
Team	Pld	W	D	L	GF	GA	GD	Pts
Russia	3	2	1	0	5	2	+3	7
Portugal	3	2	1	0	4	2	+2	7
Romania	3	0	1	2	2	4	–2	1
Finland	3	0	1	2	4	7	–3	1

24 October 2011
17:00

Romania	2–2	Finland
Tarnovan 8'; Prodan 18'	Report	Rahimi 26'; Jokinen 53'

Municipal, Santa Comba Dão
Referee: Tasos Sidiropoulos (Greece)
24 October 2011
19:00

Portugal	1–1	Russia
Nunes 60'	Report	Lomakin 2'

Fontelo, Viseu
Referee: Tolga Özkalfa (Turkey)

26 October 2011
17:00

Russia	1–0	Romania
Kurzenyov 1'	Report

Parque Desportivo Sant'Ana, Penalva do Castelo
Referee: Tasos Sidiropoulos (Greece)
26 October 2011
19:00

Portugal	2–1	Finland
Luís Rafael 15'; Podstawski 18'	Report	Voutilainen 75'

Fontelo, Viseu
Referee: Bobby Madden (Scotland)

29 October 2011
17:00

Romania	0–1	Portugal
	Report	Podstawski 42'

João Cardoso, Tondela
Referee: Tolga Özkalfa (Turkey)
29 October 2011
17:00

Finland	1–3	Russia
Sjöroos 78'	Report	Lomakin 22', 40+1'; Kurzenyov 32'

Municipal, Mangualde
Referee: Bobby Madden (Scotland)

== Group 3 ==
Team	Pld	W	D	L	GF	GA	GD	Pts
Scotland	3	2	1	0	5	1	+4	7
Turkey	3	1	2	0	4	2	+2	5
Macedonia	3	1	1	1	6	2	+4	4
San Marino	3	0	0	3	0	10	–10	0

24 October 2011
14:00

Scotland	3–0	San Marino
Findlay 3'; Kidd 46'; Hendrie 66'	Report

Mladost, Strumica
Referee: Ognjen Valjić (Bosnia and Herzegovina)
24 October 2011
14:00

Turkey	1–1	Macedonia
Çiçek 9'	Report	Aydın 25' (o.g.)

Kukuš, Strumica
Referee: Sven Bindels (Luxembourg)

26 October 2011
14:00

San Marino	0–2	Turkey
	Report	Çiçek 59', 72'

Kukuš, Strumica
Referee: Alain Bieri (Switzerland)
26 October 2011
14:00

Scotland	1–0	Macedonia
Lindsay 65'	Report

Mladost, Strumica
Referee: Alain Bieri (Switzerland)

29 October 2011
14:00

Turkey	1–1	Scotland
Çiçek 44'	Report	Telfer 64'

Mladost, Strumica
Referee: Ognjen Valjić (Bosnia and Herzegovina)
29 October 2011
14:00

Macedonia	5–0	San Marino
Velkoski 9' (pen.); Avramovski 12', 26'; Imeri 39', 51'	Report

Kukuš, Strumica
Referee: Sven Bindels (Luxembourg)

== Group 4 ==
Team	Pld	W	D	L	GF	GA	GD	Pts
Czech Republic	3	3	0	0	9	0	+9	9
Republic of Ireland	3	1	1	1	9	2	+7	4
Kazakhstan	3	1	1	1	9	3	+6	4
Liechtenstein	3	0	0	3	0	22	−22	0

19 October 2011
11:00

Republic of Ireland	8–0	Liechtenstein
R. O'Reilly 12'; O'Neill 21'; Byrne 28', 60' (pen.), 80+2'; Leddy 32' (pen.); Callan-McFadden 37'; Grealish 51'	Report

Tsentralniy, Almaty
Referee: Sergejus Slyva (Lithuania)
19 October 2011
15:00

Czech Republic	2–0	Kazakhstan
Mašek 21', 49'	Report

Tsentralniy, Almaty
Referee: Damir Batinić (Croatia)

21 October 2011
11:00

Czech Republic	6–0	Liechtenstein
Kurušta 12'; Mašek 14', 18', 26' (pen.); Půda 56'; Neumann 66'	Report

Tsentralniy, Almaty
Referee: Levan Kvaratskhelia (Georgia)
21 October 2011
15:00

Kazakhstan	1–1	Republic of Ireland
Antipov 14'	Report	Grealish 77'

Tsentralniy, Almaty
Referee: Sergejus Slyva (Lithuania)

24 October 2011
11:00

Republic of Ireland	0–1	Czech Republic
	Report	Holzer 63'

Dynamo Stadium, Almaty
Referee: Damir Batinić (Croatia)
24 October 2011
11:00

Liechtenstein	0–8	Kazakhstan
	Report	Moiseev 14', 17'; Donchenko 17', 26'; Antipov 40+1'; Aimbetov 61'; Vomenko 67'; Zhagippar 73' (pen.)

Tsentralniy, Almaty
Referee: Levan Kvaratskhelia (Georgia)

== Group 5 ==
Team	Pld	W	D	L	GF	GA	GD	Pts
Denmark	3	3	0	0	11	3	+8	9
Italy	3	2	0	1	7	6	+1	6
Austria	3	1	0	2	5	5	0	3
Cyprus	3	0	0	3	1	10	−9	0

12 October 2011
15:00

Austria	2–0	Cyprus
Grubeck 56'; Taschner 64'	Report

Brøndby Stadium, Brøndby
Referee: Eiko Saar (Estonia)
12 October 2011
18:00

Italy	1–4	Denmark
Christensen 19' (o.g.)	Report	Christensen 49'; Andersen 58'; Højbjerg 62' (pen.); Nielsen 77'

Hvidovre Stadion, Brøndby
Referee: Szymon Marciniak (Poland)

14 October 2011
15:00

Italy	3–0	Cyprus
Pedrabissi 29'; Capezzi 35' (pen.); Ferrante 74'	Report

Gladsaxe Stadium, Soborg
Referee: Vladimir Kazmenko (Russia)
14 October 2011
18:00

Denmark	2–1	Austria
Thomsen 3'; Mathiasen 18'	Report	Blutsch 61'

Brøndby Stadium, Brøndby
Referee: Szymon Marciniak (Poland)

17 October 2011
18:00

Austria	2–3	Italy
Grillitsch 51'; Taschner 61'	Report	Pedrabissi 7', 8'; Cerri 90+1'

Hvidovre Stadion, Hvidovre
Referee: Eiko Saar (Estonia)
17 October 2011
18:00

Cyprus	1–5	Denmark
Pougioukkas 55'	Report	Mathiasen 13'; M. Larsen 22'; Højbjerg 48'; Hjulsager 51'; Jørgensen 80+3'

Gladsaxe Stadium, Soborg
Referee: Vladimir Kazmenko (Russia)

== Group 6 ==
Team	Pld	W	D	L	GF	GA	GD	Pts
England	3	3	0	0	7	0	+7	9
Netherlands	3	2	0	1	7	2	+5	6
Bosnia and Herzegovina	3	1	0	2	1	5	–4	3
Latvia	3	0	0	3	1	9	–8	0

26 October 2011
14:00

Netherlands	3–0	Bosnia and Herzegovina
Aké 7'; Haye 52'; Van den Boomen 73'	Report

Grbavica, Sarajevo
Attendance: 800
Referee: Ilias Spathas (Greece)
26 October 2011
19:00

England	4–0	Latvia
Robinson 3'; Shaw 14'; Akpom 36'; Cole 58'	Report

Asim Ferhatović Hase, Sarajevo
Attendance: 120
Referee: Jovan Kaludjerović (Montenegro)

28 October 2011
14:00

England	2–0	Bosnia and Herzegovina
Hayden 46'; Akpom 68'	Report

Asim Ferhatović Hase, Sarajevo
Attendance: 400
Referee: Marios Stamatis (Cyprus)
28 October 2011
14:00

Latvia	1–4	Netherlands
Vorobjovs 52'	Report	Vilhena 23'; Lumu 28'; Marinus 31'; Van den Boomen 56'

Grbavica, Sarajevo
Attendance: 50
Referee: Ilias Spathas (Greece)

31 October 2011
14:00

Netherlands	0–1	England
	Report	Cole 21'

Asim Ferhatović Hase, Sarajevo
Attendance: 20
Referee: Jovan Kaludjerović (Montenegro)
31 October 2011
14:00

Bosnia and Herzegovina	1–0	Latvia
Gačinović 30'	Report

Grbavica, Sarajevo
Attendance: 200
Referee: Marios Stamatis (Cyprus)

== Group 7 ==
Team	Pld	W	D	L	GF	GA	GD	Pts
Belgium	3	2	0	1	5	5	0	6
Ukraine	3	1	1	1	2	1	+1	4
Azerbaijan	3	1	1	1	2	2	0	4
Croatia	3	1	0	2	5	6	–1	3

25 October 2011
15:30

Belgium	0–2	Ukraine
	Report	Bilonoh 5'; Radchenko 39'

Laco, Novigrad
Referee: Petur Reinert (Faroe Islands)
25 October 2011
15:30

Croatia	1–2	Azerbaijan
Pjaca 69'	Report	Nasirli 33'; Aliyev 53'

Valbruna, Rovinj
Referee: Andris Treimanis (Latvia)

27 October 2011
15:30

Belgium	1–0	Azerbaijan
Milošević 41'	Report

Gradski, Umag
Referee: István Kovács (Romania)
27 October 2011
15:30

Ukraine	0–1	Croatia
	Report	Pašalić 72'

Veli Jozc, Poreč
Referee: Petur Reinert (Faroe Islands)

30 October 2011
15:30

Croatia	3–4	Belgium
Mandić 72'; Faletar 79'; Kolar 80+4'	Report	Milošević 20', 50'; Dierckx 62', 80'

Laco, Novigrad
Referee: István Kovács (Romania)
30 October 2011
15:30

Azerbaijan	0–0	Ukraine
	Report

Veli Jozc, Poreč
Referee: Andris Treimanis (Latvia)

== Group 8 ==
Team	Pld	W	D	L	GF	GA	GD	Pts
Sweden	3	2	1	0	5	0	+5	7
Georgia	3	2	0	1	5	5	0	6
Bulgaria	3	1	1	1	4	3	+1	4
Moldova	3	0	0	3	1	7	−6	0

21 September 2011
11:00

Georgia	3–2	Bulgaria
Chechelashvili 19' (pen.); Akhvlediani 23'; Papunashvili 69'	Report	Petkov 17', 71'

Dinamo Auto, Tiraspol
Referee: Nikola Dabanović (Montenegro)
21 September 2011
15:00

Sweden	3–0	Moldova
Gherman 21' (o.g.); Olsson 39'; Kouakou 48'	Report

City Stadium, Vadul lui Vodă
Referee: Arnold Hunter (Northern Ireland)

23 September 2011
11:00

Bulgaria	0–0	Sweden
	Report

District Sport Complex, Orhei
Referee: Arnold Hunter (Northern Ireland)
23 September 2011
15:00

Georgia	2–1	Moldova
Chechelashvili 34' (pen.); N. Tchanturia 39'	Report	Iriciuc 65'

City Stadium, Vadul lui Vodă
Referee: Nikola Dabanović (Montenegro)

26 September 2011
15:00

Sweden	2–0	Georgia
Haglind Sangré 43'; Kouakou 64'	Report

District Sport Complex, Orhei
Referee: Clayton Pisani (Malta)
26 September 2011
15:00

Moldova	0–2	Bulgaria
	Report	Petkov 54'; Kolev 60'

City Stadium, Vadul lui Vodă
Referee: Nikola Dabanović (Montenegro)

== Group 9 ==
Team	Pld	W	D	L	GF	GA	GD	Pts
Serbia	3	3	0	0	10	2	+8	9
Lithuania	3	1	0	2	4	4	0	3
Wales	3	1	0	2	5	9	−4	3
Armenia	3	1	0	2	4	8	−4	3

17 October 2011
14:30

Serbia	2–0	Lithuania
Spremo 10'; Simić 77'	Report

Stadion Promenada, Jakovo
Referee: Ioannis Anastasiou (Cyprus)
17 October 2011
15:15

Wales	2–3	Armenia
Hill 11', 29'	Report	Harutyunyan 40', 57'; Bakalyan 80+2'

Suvača, Pećinci
Referee: Aleksander Gauzer (Kazakhstan)

19 October 2011
14:30

Wales	2–0	Lithuania
James 3'; Weeks 70'	Report

Stadion Promenada, Jakovo
Referee: Ivan Kružliak (Slovakia)
19 October 2011
14:30

Armenia	1–2	Serbia
Minasyan 6'	Report	Ivković 33', 60'

Suvača, Pećinci
Referee: Ioannis Anastasiou (Cyprus)

22 October 2011
14:30

Serbia	6–1	Wales
Ivković 4'; Zdjelar 9'; Simić 33'; Jakšić 38'; Tepić 61'; Janković 80+3'	Report	Jones 63'

Stadion Promenada, Jakovo
Referee: Aleksander Gauzer (Kazakhstan)
22 October 2011
14:30

Lithuania	4–0	Armenia
Stankevičius 20', 57', 73', 80+1'	Report

Suvača, Pećinci
Referee: Ivan Kružliak (Slovakia)

== Group 10 ==
Team	Pld	W	D	L	GF	GA	GD	Pts
France	3	3	0	0	11	0	+11	9
Luxembourg	3	1	1	1	2	3	−1	4
Northern Ireland	3	1	0	2	2	5	−3	3
Faroe Islands	3	0	1	2	1	8	−7	1

28 October 2011
16:30

France	5–0	Faroe Islands
Martial 16', 48'; Labidi 22'; Brunard 28'; Chemlal 61'	Report

Stade Rodange, Rodange
Referee: Thorvaldur Árnason (Iceland)
28 October 2011
19:00

Northern Ireland	0–1	Luxembourg
	Report	Sacras 7'

Municipal, Pétange
Referee: Miroslav Zelinka (Czech Republic)

30 October 2011
16:30

Northern Ireland	2–0	Faroe Islands
McGillian 30'; Ball 40+1'	Report

Municipal, Pétange
Referee: Vlado Glodjović (Serbia)
30 October 2011
19:00

Luxembourg	0–2	France
	Report	Chemlal 12', 55'

Kaerjenger Dribbel, Hautcharage
Referee: Miroslav Zelinka (Czech Republic)

2 November 2011
19:00

France	4–0	Northern Ireland
Martial 14', 50', 65'; Fofana 20'	Report

Kaerjenger Dribbel, Hautcharage
Referee: Vlado Glodjović (Serbia)
2 November 2011
19:00

Faroe Islands	1–1	Luxembourg
Jacobsen 49'	Report	Mersch 80+4'

Stade Rodange, Rodange
Referee: Thorvaldur Árnason (Iceland)

== Group 11 ==
Team	Pld	W	D	L	GF	GA	GD	Pts
Spain	3	3	0	0	10	1	+9	9
Poland	3	2	0	1	5	2	+3	6
Montenegro	3	1	0	2	4	4	0	3
Malta	3	0	0	3	0	12	−12	0

19 October 2011
14:30

Poland	3–0	Malta
M. Stępiński 42' (pen.), 56'; Rabiega 51'	Report

Camp FSCG, Podgorica
Referee: Yevhen Aranovskiy (Ukraine)
19 October 2011
18:00

Spain	2–1	Montenegro
Sandro 31' (pen.), 44'	Report	Boljević 40+1'

Stadion Pod Goricom, Podgorica
Referee: Jakob Kehlet (Denmark)

21 October 2011
14:30

Spain	6–0	Malta
Samper 9'; Sandro 30' (pen.), 69', 80'; Arguez 56'; Serrano 59'	Report

Mladost Stadion, Podgorica
Referee: Jakob Kehlet (Denmark)
22 October 2011
12:30

Montenegro	0–2	Poland
	Report	Cierpka 70'; Żwir 75'

Camp FSCG, Podgorica
Referee: Aleksei Eskov (Russia)

24 October 2011
14:30

Poland	0–2	Spain
	Report	Sandro 56', 57'

Stadion Pod Goricom, Podgorica
Referee: Yevhen Aranovskiy (Ukraine)
24 October 2011
14:30

Malta	0–3	Montenegro
	Report	Krstović 12'; Cmiljanić 13'; Lalošević 79'

Camp FSCG, Podgorica
Referee: Aleksei Eskov (Russia)

== Group 12 ==
Team	Pld	W	D	L	GF	GA	GD	Pts
Germany	3	3	0	0	8	0	+8	9
Albania	3	1	1	1	3	3	0	4
Slovakia	3	1	0	2	6	4	+2	3
Estonia	3	0	1	2	1	11	−10	1

13 October 2011
14:00

Slovakia	1–2	Albania
Ďuriš 45'	Report	Ymeralilaj 43', 58'

Kadrioru Stadium, Tallinn
Attendance: 53
Referee: Domagoj Vučkov (Croatia)
13 October 2011
18:00

Germany	5–0	Estonia
Gnabry 10'; Süle 61'; Sarr 66'; Benkarit 74'; Dudziak 80'	Report

A. Le Coq Arena, Tallinn
Attendance: 205
Referee: Kenn Hansen (Denmark)

15 October 2011
18:00

Slovakia	5–0	Estonia
Ďuriš 7'; Škriniar 17'; Zuziak 70', 80+4'; Šatka 72'	Report

A. Le Coq Arena, Tallinn
Attendance: 252
Referee: Domagoj Vučkov (Croatia)
15 October 2011
18:00

Albania	0–1	Germany
	Report	Sarr 52' (pen.)

Kadrioru Stadium, Tallinn
Attendance: 70
Referee: Davit Kharitonashvili (Georgia)

18 October 2011
14:00

Germany	2–0	Slovakia
Goretzka 10'; Benkarit 23'	Report

Kadrioru Stadium, Tallinn
Attendance: 25
Referee: Kenn Hansen (Denmark)
18 October 2011
14:00

Estonia	1–1	Albania
Paur 80'	Report	Jonuzi 52' (pen.)

A. Le Coq Arena, Tallinn
Attendance: 95
Referee: Davit Kharitonashvili (Georgia)

== Group 13 ==
Team	Pld	W	D	L	GF	GA	GD	Pts
Iceland	3	2	0	1	3	5	−2	6
Switzerland	3	1	1	1	7	4	+3	4
Greece	3	1	1	1	4	2	+2	4
Israel	3	1	0	2	4	7	−3	3

12 October 2011
11:00

Greece	4–1	Israel
Papadopoulos 32', 59'; Vergos 34'; Fountas 61'	Report	Ohana 39'

Haberfeld Stadium, Rishon LeZion
Referee: Bardhyl Pashaj (Albania)
12 October 2011
11:00

Switzerland	5–1	Iceland
Tarashaj 10'; Mazreku 20'; Garetto 22'; Thali 69'; Sulejmani 80+4'	Report	Ásmundsson 40'

Bat Yam Municipal Stadium, Bat Yam
Referee: Oleksandr Derdo (Ukraine)

14 October 2011
11:00

Greece	0–1	Iceland
	Report	Thorsteinsson 48'

Bat Yam Municipal Stadium, Bat Yam
Referee: Slavko Vinčić (Slovenia)
14 October 2011
11:00

Israel	3–2	Switzerland
Ohana 41', 47'; Harush 59'	Report	Sulejmani 25'; Tarashaj 37'

Haberfeld Stadium, Rishon LeZion
Referee: Bardhyl Pashaj (Albania)

17 October 2011
11:00

Switzerland	0–0	Greece
	Report

Bat Yam Municipal Stadium, Bat Yam
Referee: Oleksandr Derdo (Ukraine)
17 October 2011
11:00

Iceland	1–0	Israel
Pálsson 77'	Report

Haberfeld Stadium, Rishon LeZion
Referee: Slavko Vinčić (Slovenia)

== Ranking of 3rd placed teams ==
Counting results against group winners and runners-up. Top 2 will advance to the Elite Round.

Group	Team	Pld	W	D	L	GF	GA	GD	Pts
9	Wales	2	1	0	1	3	6	−3	3
8	Bulgaria	2	0	1	1	2	3	−1	1
3	Macedonia	2	0	1	1	1	2	−1	1
13	Greece	2	0	1	1	0	1	−1	1
7	Azerbaijan	2	0	1	1	0	1	−1	1
4	Kazakhstan	2	0	1	1	1	3	−2	1
5	Austria	2	0	0	2	3	5	−2	0
2	Romania	2	0	0	2	0	2	−2	0
11	Montenegro	2	0	0	2	1	4	−3	0
12	Slovakia	2	0	0	2	1	4	−3	0
1	Norway	2	0	0	2	2	6	−4	0
6	Bosnia and Herzegovina	2	0	0	2	0	5	−5	0
10	Northern Ireland	2	0	0	2	0	5	−5	0
