= 2006 UEFA European Under-17 Championship qualifying round =

Football tournament qualification stage

2006 UEFA U-17 Championship qualifying round was the first round of qualifications for the main tournament of 2006 UEFA European Under-17 Championship. The top two teams from each group and the best third-placed team entered the elite round.

== Matches ==
=== Group 1 ===
Teams	GP	W	D	L	GF	GA	GD	Pts
Serbia and Montenegro	3	3	0	0	9	1	8	9
Northern Ireland	3	2	0	1	5	4	1	6
Lithuania	3	1	0	2	2	5	-3	3
Malta	3	0	0	3	1	7	-6	0

27 September	Northern Ireland	3–1	Malta	Kaunas, Lithuania
	Serbia and Montenegro	4–0	Lithuania	Marijampolė, Lithuania
29 September	Northern Ireland	1–0	Lithuania	Marijampolė, Lithuania
	Malta	0–2	Serbia and Montenegro	Kaunas, Lithuania
1 October	Serbia and Montenegro	3–1	Northern Ireland	Kaunas, Lithuania
	Lithuania	2–0	Malta	Marijampolė, Lithuania

=== Group 2 ===
Teams	GP	W	D	L	GF	GA	GD	Pts
Republic of Ireland	3	2	1	0	6	3	3	7
Italy	3	1	2	0	6	5	1	5
Ukraine	3	1	1	1	4	4	0	4
Latvia	3	0	0	3	1	5	-4	0

27 September	Italy	2–1	Latvia	Kyiv, Ukraine
	Ukraine	1–2	Republic of Ireland	Kyiv, Ukraine
29 September	Latvia	0–1	Ukraine	Kyiv, Ukraine
	Italy	2–2	Republic of Ireland	Kyiv, Ukraine
1 October	Ukraine	2–2	Italy	Kyiv, Ukraine
	Republic of Ireland	2–0	Latvia	Kyiv, Ukraine

=== Group 3 ===
Teams	GP	W	D	L	GF	GA	GD	Pts
Belgium	3	1	2	0	5	4	1	5
Bulgaria	3	1	1	1	5	2	3	4
Austria	3	1	1	1	4	6	-2	4
Georgia	3	0	2	1	3	5	-2	2

19 October	Austria	0–4	Bulgaria	Aalter, Belgium
	Belgium	2–2	Georgia	Deinze, Belgium
21 October	Georgia	0–2	Austria	Oudenaarde, Belgium
	Belgium	1–0	Bulgaria	Deinze, Belgium
23 October	Austria	2–2	Belgium	Aalter, Belgium
	Bulgaria	1–1	Georgia	Oudenaarde, Belgium

=== Group 4 ===
Teams	GP	W	D	L	GF	GA	GD	Pts
Russia	3	2	1	0	6	1	5	7
Israel	3	2	0	1	12	4	8	6
Azerbaijan	3	1	1	1	5	6	-1	4
Armenia	3	0	0	3	2	14	-12	0

24 October	Israel	5–1	Azerbaijan	Herzliya, Israel
	Russia	4–0	Armenia	Kfar Saba, Israel
26 October	Israel	7–2	Armenia	Herzliya, Israel
	Azerbaijan	1–1	Russia	Kfar Saba, Israel
28 October	Russia	1–0	Israel	Herzliya, Israel
	Armenia	0–3	Azerbaijan	Kfar Saba, Israel

=== Group 5 ===
Teams	GP	W	D	L	GF	GA	GD	Pts
Germany	3	3	0	0	16	0	16	9
Portugal	3	2	0	1	9	2	7	6
Faroe Islands	3	0	1	2	3	11	-8	1
San Marino	3	0	1	2	3	18	-15	1

14 October	Portugal	5–0	San Marino	Figueira da Foz, Portugal
	Germany	4–0	Faroe Islands	Touriz, Portugal
16 October	Portugal	4–0	Faroe Islands	Tábua, Portugal
	San Marino	0–10	Germany	Soure, Portugal
18 October	Germany	2–0	Portugal	Coimbra, Portugal
	Faroe Islands	3–3	San Marino	Figueira da Foz, Portugal

=== Group 6 ===
Teams	GP	W	D	L	GF	GA	GD	Pts
Sweden	3	2	1	0	10	3	7	7
Czech Republic	3	2	0	1	10	4	6	6
Iceland	3	1	1	1	9	6	3	4
Andorra	3	0	0	3	0	16	-16	0

23 September	Iceland	6–0	Andorra	Andorra La Vella, Andorra
	Czech Republic	1–3	Sweden	Andorra La Vella, Andorra
25 September	Iceland	2–2	Sweden	Andorra La Vella, Andorra
	Andorra	0–5	Czech Republic	Andorra La Vella, Andorra
27 September	Czech Republic	4–1	Iceland	Andorra La Vella, Andorra
	Sweden	5–0	Andorra	Foix, Andorra

=== Group 7 ===
Teams	GP	W	D	L	GF	GA	GD	Pts
Finland	3	2	1	0	5	2	3	7
Slovakia	3	2	0	1	12	4	8	6
Greece	3	1	0	2	3	10	-7	3
Bosnia and Herzegovina	3	0	1	2	4	8	-4	1

19 September	Finland	3–1	Slovakia	Ekenäs, Finland
	Greece	3–2	Bosnia and Herzegovina	Kerava, Finland
21 September	Slovakia	7–0	Greece	Lohja, Finland
	Finland	1–1	Bosnia and Herzegovina	Kerava, Finland
23 September	Greece	0–1	Finland	Lohja, Finland
	Bosnia and Herzegovina	1–4	Slovakia	Ekenäs, Finland

=== Group 8 ===
Teams	GP	W	D	L	GF	GA	GD	Pts
Moldova	3	2	1	0	6	2	4	7
Poland	3	2	1	0	4	0	4	7
Norway	3	1	0	2	3	5	-2	3
Liechtenstein	3	0	0	3	3	9	-6	0

20 September	Moldova	4–2	Liechtenstein	Szubin, Poland
	Poland	2–0	Norway	Bydgoszcz, Poland
22 September	Liechtenstein	0–2	Poland	Toruń, Poland
	Moldova	2–0	Norway	Świecie, Poland
24 September	Poland	0–0	Moldova	Szubin, Poland
	Norway	3–1	Liechtenstein	Toruń, Poland

=== Group 9 ===
Teams	GP	W	D	L	GF	GA	GD	Pts
Turkey	3	3	0	0	6	1	5	9
Romania	3	1	1	1	4	1	3	4
Croatia	3	1	1	1	2	1	1	4
Macedonia	3	0	0	3	1	10	-9	0

16 October	Turkey	1–0	Romania	Ohrid, Macedonia
	Croatia	2–0	Macedonia	Struga, Macedonia
18 October	Romania	0–0	Croatia	Struga, Macedonia
	Turkey	4–1	Macedonia	Ohrid, Macedonia
20 October	Croatia	0–1	Turkey	Ohrid, Macedonia
	Macedonia	0–4	Romania	Struga, Macedonia

=== Group 10 ===
Teams	GP	W	D	L	GF	GA	GD	Pts
Hungary	3	3	0	0	9	1	8	9
Cyprus	3	2	0	1	3	2	1	6
Scotland	3	1	0	2	3	3	0	3
Albania	3	0	0	3	1	10	-9	0

26 September	Cyprus	1–0	Scotland	Andráshida, Hungary
	Albania	1–5	Hungary	Zalaegerszeg, Hungary
28 September	Albania	0–3	Scotland	Andráshida, Hungary
	Hungary	2–0	Cyprus	Zalaegerszeg, Hungary
30 September	Cyprus	2–0	Albania	Andráshida, Hungary
	Scotland	0–2	Hungary	Zalaegerszeg, Hungary

=== Group 11 ===
Teams	GP	W	D	L	GF	GA	GD	Pts
Netherlands	3	1	2	0	3	2	1	5
Denmark	3	1	2	0	2	1	1	5
Belarus	3	1	1	1	1	1	0	4
Slovenia	3	0	1	2	1	3	-2	1

29 September 2005 15:00

Netherlands	1–1	Slovenia
Nieveld 42'	Report	Žigon 75'

Torpedo Stadium, Minsk

29 September 2005 17:00

Denmark	0–0	Belarus
	Report

Traktor Stadium, Minsk

1 October 2005 15:00

Slovenia	0–1	Denmark
	Report	Hjort 77'

Torpedo Stadium, Minsk

1 October 2005 17:00

Netherlands	1–0	Belarus
Ter Horst 43'	Report

Traktor Stadium, Minsk

3 October 2005 17:00

Denmark	1–1	Netherlands
Hansen 4'	Report	Wattamaleo 41' (pen.)

Torpedo Stadium, Minsk

3 October 2005 17:00

Belarus	1–0	Slovenia
Zubovich 45'	Report

Traktor Stadium, Minsk

=== Group 12 ===
Teams	GP	W	D	L	GF	GA	GD	Pts
Switzerland	3	3	0	0	12	2	10	9
Wales	3	1	1	1	4	5	-1	4
Estonia	3	1	0	2	3	8	-5	3
Kazakhstan	3	0	1	2	4	8	-4	1

22 September	Wales	2–2	Kazakhstan	Flint, Wales
	Switzerland	5–1	Estonia	Rhyl, Wales
24 September	Kazakhstan	1–4	Switzerland	Flint, Wales
	Wales	2–0	Estonia	Rhyl, Wales
26 September	Switzerland	3–0	Wales	Wrexham, Wales
	Estonia	2–1	Kazakhstan	Flint, Wales

== 3rd Place table ==
The best third-placed team was determined by the results against the top two teams of the same group.

GR	Teams	GP	W	D	L	GF	GA	GD	Pts
2	Ukraine	2	0	1	1	3	4	-1	1
9	Croatia	2	0	1	1	0	1	-1	1
11	Belarus	2	0	1	1	0	1	-1	1
6	Iceland	2	0	1	1	3	6	-3	1
3	Austria	2	0	1	1	2	6	-4	1
4	Azerbaijan	2	0	1	1	2	6	-4	1
10	Scotland	2	0	0	2	0	3	-3	0
8	Norway	2	0	0	2	0	4	-4	0
1	Lithuania	2	0	0	2	0	5	-5	0
12	Estonia	2	0	0	2	1	7	-6	0
5	Faroe Islands	2	0	0	2	0	8	-8	0
7	Greece	2	0	0	2	0	8	-8	0

England/Spain/France bye this round,Luxembourg as host, elite round bye.
