= Moldova national under-17 football team =

National youth association football team

Moldova Under-17
- Nickname: Tricolorii juniori (The Junior Tricolours)
- Association: Moldovan Football Federation (FMF)
- Confederation: UEFA (Europe)
- Head coach: Nicolae Bunea
- Home stadium: Various
- FIFA code: MDA
First colours	Second colours

First international
- Official: Moldova 1–1 Austria (Heiligeneich, Austria; 5 October 1994)

Biggest win
- Liechtenstein 0–7 Moldova (Kato Achaia, Greece; 9 October 2002); Gibraltar 0–7 Moldova (Chișinău, Moldova; 29 April 2026)

Biggest defeat
- Germany 7–0 Moldova (Cologne, Germany; 26 November 1997)

European Championship
- Appearances: 1 (first in 2002)
- Best result: Group Stage (2002)
- Website: fmf.md (in Romanian)

The Moldova national under-17 football team represents Moldova in international football at this age level and is controlled by the Moldovan Football Federation, the governing body for football in Moldova.

The team competes to qualify for the UEFA European Under-17 Championship held every year. They qualified for the 2002 competition but finished last in the group stage. Players born on or after 1 January 2010 are eligible for the 2027 UEFA European Under-17 Championship qualification. They are currently coached by Nicolae Bunea.

== Results and fixtures ==
The following is a list of match results in the last 12 months, as well as any future matches that have been scheduled.

Win Draw Loss Fixture

=== 2026 ===
25 March 2026 Friendly	Hungary	3–0	Moldova	Budapest, Hungary
	Görög 30', 77'; Polonkai 85'	Report		Stadium: UTE Atlétikai Stadion; Referee: Barnabas Drabon (Hungary)

28 March 2026 Friendly	Hungary	3–1	Moldova	Budapest, Hungary
	Berekméri-Szigeti 24'; Vasiljevic 29', 72'	Report	Ceacîru 20'	Stadium: UTE Atlétikai Stadion; Referee: Gabor Ivanyi (Hungary)

23 April 2026 2026 UEFA Euro Under-17 qualifying round 2	Moldova	0–0	Bosnia and Herzegovina	Chișinău, Moldova
		Report		Stadium: Stadionul Zimbru; Attendance: 64; Referee: Benjamin Brand (Germany)

26 April 2026 2026 UEFA Euro Under-17 qualifying round 2	Finland	0–0	Moldova	Chișinău, Moldova
		Report		Stadium: Stadionul Zimbru; Attendance: 280; Referee: Robin Hensgens (Netherlands)

29 April 2026 2026 UEFA Euro Under-17 qualifying round 2	Gibraltar	0–7	Moldova	Chișinău, Moldova
		Report	Ciuchin 14'; Ceacîru 16', 37', 48', 90+7'; Roșioru 41'; Turețchi 68'	Stadium: Stadionul Zimbru; Attendance: 105; Referee: Andreu Simarro (Andorra)

7 September 2026 Friendly	Moldova	2–0	Azerbaijan	Vadul lui Vodă, Moldova
	Calmîc 43', 89'	Report		Stadium: Stadionul CPSM; Referee: Vlad Mortean (Moldova)

9 September 2026 Friendly	Moldova	0–3	Latvia	Vadul lui Vodă, Moldova
		Report	Laimiņš 71'; Siliņš 74'; Galarovskis 81'	Stadium: Stadionul CPSM; Referee: Alexandru Ababii (Moldova)

16 October 2026 2027 UEFA Euro Under-17 qualifying round 1	Czech Republic	2–0	Moldova	Chișinău, Moldova
	Nádeníček 8'; Soused 73'	Report		Stadium: Stadionul Zimbru; Attendance: 207; Referee: Aaron Wyn Jones (Wales)

19 October 2026 2027 UEFA Euro Under-17 qualifying round 1	Slovenia	3–2	Moldova	Chișinău, Moldova
	Križanič 67', 79'; Jevšnik 88'	Report	Gîrneț 45+1', 45+2'	Stadium: Stadionul Zimbru; Attendance: 167; Referee: Ioannis Christodoulou (Cyprus)

22 October 2026 2027 UEFA Euro Under-17 qualifying round 1	Moldova	0–1	Belarus	Chișinău, Moldova
		Report	Tsimafeyeu 26'	Stadium: Stadionul Zimbru; Attendance: 171; Referee: Ioannis Christodoulou (Cyprus)

=== 2027 UEFA European Under-17 Championship qualification ===
==== Round 1 ====
===== Group 8 =====
Pos	Team	Pld	W	D	L	GF	GA	GD	Pts	Qualification
1	Czech Republic	3	3	0	0	10	2	+8	9	Round 2 League A
2	Belarus	3	2	0	1	5	4	+1	6	Round 2 League A
3	Slovenia	3	1	0	2	5	10	−5	3	Round 2 League B
4	Moldova (H)	3	0	0	3	2	6	−4	0	Round 2 League B

Source: UEFA
Rules for classification: Tiebreakers
(H) Hosts

== Coaching staff ==
Position	Staff
Head coach	(Moldova) Nicolae Bunea
Assistant coaches	(Moldova) Gheorghe Ovseanicov (Moldova) Vladislav Postîrnac
Goalkeeping coach	(Moldova) Serghei Botnaraș

Last updated: 25 August 2026
Source: FMF

== Players ==
=== Current squad ===
The following players were selected for the 2027 UEFA Euro U17 qualifying matches against Czech Republic, Slovenia and Belarus on 16 and 19 and 22 October 2026, respectively.

Squad is correct as of 22 October 2026, after the match against Belarus.

No.	Pos.	Player	Date of birth (age)	Club
1	GK	Francesco Agrati	21 September 2010 (age 16)	(Italian Football Federation) Lecco Giovanili
12	GK	Vladislav Tincovan	17 August 2011 (age 15)	(Moldovan Football Federation) Dacia Buiucani U17
2	DF	Ștefan Colța	7 January 2010 (age 16)	(Hellenic Football Federation) Olympiacos U17
3	DF	Timur Gamurar	2 September 2010 (age 16)	(Moldovan Football Federation) Dacia Buiucani U17
5	DF	David Ostafii	10 July 2010 (age 16)	(Royal Spanish Football Federation) Getafe Juvenil
13	DF	Vlad Vizitiu	28 August 2010 (age 16)	(Moldovan Football Federation) Dacia Buiucani U17
14	DF	Hector Crecesco	8 May 2010 (age 16)	(Royal Dutch Football Association) Excelsior Jeugd
19	DF	Vlad Proaspăt	18 April 2010 (age 16)	(Moldovan Football Federation) Zimbru Chișinău U17
4	DF	Maxim Patron	3 November 2010 (age 16)	(Moldovan Football Federation) Academia Rebeja-UTM
6	MF	Darius Dodonu	12 March 2010 (age 16)	(Moldovan Football Federation) Academia Rebeja-UTM
8	MF	Bogdan Lupașcu	6 December 2010 (age 15)	(Moldovan Football Federation) Academia Rebeja-UTM
9	MF	Ion Calmîc	11 September 2010 (age 16)	(Moldovan Football Federation) Academia Rebeja-UTM
10	MF	Mihai Pușcașu (captain)	15 June 2010 (age 16)	(Italian Football Federation) Mantova U19
16	MF	Cătălin Galicenco	26 November 2010 (age 15)	(Moldovan Football Federation) Getica Chișinău
17	MF	Angelo Pogor	20 February 2010 (age 16)	(Italian Football Federation) Union Brescia Giovanili
7	FW	Damian Hangan	5 July 2010 (age 16)	(Royal Spanish Football Federation) Cornellà Juvenil
11	FW	Alexandru Mardari	1 January 2010 (age 16)	(Moldovan Football Federation) Getica Chișinău
15	FW	Alexandr Gîrneț	10 May 2010 (age 16)	(Moldovan Football Federation) Dacia Buiucani U17
18	FW	Alexandru Bocancea	17 April 2010 (age 16)	(Moldovan Football Federation) Zimbru Chișinău U17
20	FW	Daniel Țaranu	21 January 2010 (age 16)	(Moldovan Football Federation) Zimbru Chișinău U17

== Competition history ==
Until the 1997 tournament, players born on or after 1 August the year they turned 17 years were eligible to compete. Since the 1998 tournament, the date limit has been moved back to 1 January. Starting with qualification for the 2002 tournament, the competition was renamed from Under-16 Championship to Under-17 Championship, but the eligibility rules did not change.

=== UEFA U-16/17 European Championship ===
Under-16 era, 1995–2001
Under-17 era, 2002–present

Hosted tournament Hosted qualifying

UEFA U-16/17 European Championship record										UEFA U-16/17 Qualification record								
Year	Round	Pld	W	D	L	GF	GA	GD	Squad	Pld	W	D	L	GF	GA	GD	Campaign	
(Belgium) 1995	Did not qualify									2	1	1	0	4	1	+3	1995	
(Austria) 1996	Did not qualify									2	0	1	1	1	4	−3	1996	
(Germany) 1997	Did not qualify									2	1	0	1	3	3	0	1997	
(Scotland) 1998	Did not qualify									3	0	0	3	1	18	−17	1998	
(Czech Republic) 1999	Did not qualify									2	0	0	2	2	6	−4	1999	
(Israel) 2000	Did not qualify									3	0	1	2	0	4	−4	2000	
(England) 2001	Did not qualify									3	0	1	2	4	7	−3	2001	
(Denmark) 2002	Group stage	3	0	0	3	7	13	−6	Squad	2	2	0	0	4	1	+3	2002	
(Portugal) 2003	Did not qualify									3	1	1	1	8	4	+4	2003	
(France) 2004	Did not qualify									6	2	2	2	9	10	−1	2004	2004
(Italy) 2005	Did not qualify									3	0	1	2	0	3	−3	2005	
(Luxembourg) 2006	Did not qualify									6	2	2	2	9	10	−1	2006	2006
(Belgium) 2007	Did not qualify									3	0	0	3	1	6	−5	2007	
(Turkey) 2008	Did not qualify									3	1	0	2	3	7	−4	2008	
(Germany) 2009	Did not qualify									3	0	0	3	1	12	−11	2009	
(Liechtenstein) 2010	Did not qualify									3	0	2	1	2	7	−5	2010	
(Serbia) 2011	Did not qualify									3	0	0	3	2	11	−9	2011	
(Slovenia) 2012	Did not qualify									3	0	0	3	1	7	−6	2012	
(Slovakia) 2013	Did not qualify									3	1	0	2	3	5	−2	2013	
(Malta) 2014	Did not qualify									3	0	1	2	1	6	−5	2014	
(Bulgaria) 2015	Did not qualify									3	1	1	1	4	3	+1	2015	
(Azerbaijan) 2016	Did not qualify									3	0	1	2	1	7	−6	2016	
(Croatia) 2017	Did not qualify									3	0	0	3	0	8	−8	2017	
(England) 2018	Did not qualify									3	0	0	3	0	8	−8	2018	
(Republic of Ireland) 2019	Did not qualify									3	0	1	2	2	4	−2	2019	
(Estonia) ~~2020~~	Did not qualify									3	0	1	2	0	6	−6	2020	
(Israel) 2022	Did not qualify									3	0	1	2	0	4	−4	2022	
(Hungary) 2023	Did not qualify									3	0	1	2	3	8	−5	2023	
(Cyprus) 2024	Did not qualify									3	0	0	3	2	9	−7	2024	
(Albania) 2025	Did not qualify									6	0	0	6	0	15	−15	2025	2025
(Estonia) 2026	Did not qualify									6	1	3	2	8	8	0	2026	2026
(Latvia) 2027	Did not qualify									3	0	0	3	2	6	−4	2027	2027
(Lithuania) 2028	To be determined									To be determined								
(Moldova) 2029	Qualified as host									To be determined								
Total	1/32	3	0	0	3	7	13	−6		103	13	22	68	81	218	−137		

== Head-to-head record ==
Friendly games are not included and correct as of last competitive match played on 22 October 2026.

Opponents	Pld	W	D	L	GF	GA	GD
Albania	1	1	0	0	3	0	+3
Andorra	1	0	0	1	0	1	−1
Armenia	4	3	0	1	10	3	+7
Austria	3	0	3	0	1	1	0
Azerbaijan	1	0	0	1	0	1	−1
Belarus	3	0	0	3	0	8	−8
Belgium	3	0	0	3	0	5	−5
Bosnia and Herzegovina	7	0	2	5	1	15	−14
Bulgaria	2	0	0	2	1	5	−4
Croatia	1	0	0	1	0	3	−3
Cyprus	4	0	0	4	0	7	−7
Czechia	3	0	1	2	2	5	−3
Denmark	0	0	0	0	0	0	0
England	0	0	0	0	0	0	0
Estonia	2	1	0	1	2	1	+1
Faroe Islands	0	0	0	0	0	0	0
Finland	4	0	1	3	0	7	−7
France	1	0	0	1	0	3	−3
Georgia	1	0	0	1	1	2	−1
Germany	4	0	0	4	1	16	−15
Gibraltar	1	1	0	0	7	0	+7
Greece	4	0	3	1	3	4	−1
Hungary	1	0	0	1	1	3	−2
Iceland	1	0	1	0	0	0	0
Ireland	0	0	0	0	0	0	0
Israel	3	0	1	2	3	13	−10
Italy	3	0	0	3	0	10	−10
Kazakhstan	1	1	0	0	4	3	+1
Kosovo	1	0	0	1	0	1	−1
Latvia	4	0	1	3	4	10	−6
Liechtenstein	2	2	0	0	11	2	+9
Lithuania	1	0	1	0	1	1	0
Luxembourg	1	0	0	1	0	2	−2
Malta	1	1	0	0	2	0	+2
Montenegro	2	1	0	1	3	4	−1
Netherlands	0	0	0	0	0	0	0
North Macedonia	1	0	0	1	0	2	−2
Northern Ireland	1	0	0	1	0	3	−3
Norway	4	1	3	0	4	2	+2
Poland	3	0	1	2	0	6	−6
Portugal	0	0	0	0	0	0	0
Romania	1	0	1	0	2	2	0
Russia	2	0	0	2	1	10	−9
San Marino	1	1	0	0	3	0	+3
Scotland	0	0	0	0	0	0	0
Serbia	2	0	0	2	0	9	−9
FR Yugoslavia	1	0	0	1	3	6	−3
Slovakia	4	0	1	3	1	8	−7
Slovenia	1	0	0	1	2	3	−1
Spain	4	0	0	4	3	14	−11
Sweden	3	0	0	3	3	10	−7
Switzerland	2	0	0	2	0	8	−8
Turkey	0	0	0	0	0	0	0
Ukraine	3	0	1	2	2	7	−5
Wales	2	0	1	1	3	5	−2
Total	106	13	22	71	88	231	−143

== See also ==
- Moldova national football team
- Moldova national under-21 football team
- Moldova national under-19 football team
