= Albania national under-16 football team =

National U-16 association football team

Albania Under-16
- Nickname(s): Kuqezinjtë (The Red and Blacks); Shqiponjat (The Eagles)
- Association: Federata Shqiptare e Futbollit – FSHF (Albanian Football Association)
- Confederation: UEFA
- Head coach: Agron Kërçova
- Most caps: Orges Shehi (5)
- Top scorer: Renato Kendezi (2)
- Home stadium: Elbasan Arena; Loro Boriçi Stadium
- FIFA code: ALB
First colours	Second colours	Third colours

The Albania national under-16 football team represents Albania in international football at this age level and is controlled by Albanian Football Association, the governing body for football in Albania.

The Albania U16 football team is a feeder team of Albania U17.

The team competed in the UEFA European Under-16 Football Championship, but after the rule change in 1997, the event had an age limit of 17.

14 years after playing their last event, the Albania under-16 team returned playing football, this time at the friendly tournament UEFA Development Tournament 2015, which took event exactly in Albania. The appointed coach was Alban Bushi, a former player and current manager of the Albania national team. The tournament took part from 2 to 5 May 2015.

== History ==
=== 1991 UEFA European Under-16 Championship qualifying ===
==== Group 5 ====
Teams	Pld	W	D	L	GF	GA	GD	Pts
Bulgaria	2	2	0	0	3	1	+2	4
Albania	2	0	0	2	1	3	-2	0

6 March 1991	Albania	1–2	Bulgaria
20 March 1991	Bulgaria	1–0	Albania

==== Squad ====
The following players participated in the tournament.

No.	Pos.	Player	Date of birth (age)	Caps	Goals	Club
	GK					
	DF					
	MF					
	FW					

=== 1992 UEFA European Under-16 Championship qualifying ===
==== Group 4 ====
Teams	Pld	W	D	L	GF	GA	GD	Pts
Germany	1	1	0	0	8	1	+7	2
Albania	1	0	0	1	1	8	-7	0

07 November 1991	Germany	8-1	Albania
18 March 1992	Albania	n-p	Germany

=== 1993 UEFA European Under-16 Championship qualifying ===
==== Group 5 ====
Teams	Pld	W	D	L	GF	GA	GD	Pts
Portugal	2	1	0	1	3	2	+1	2
Albania	2	1	0	1	2	3	-1	2

27 January 1993	Portugal	3-1	Albania
03 March 1993	Albania	1-0	Portugal

=== 1994 UEFA European Under-16 Championship ===
==== Group 5 ====
Teams	Pld	W	D	L	GF	GA	GD	Pts
Albania	2	2	0	0	3	0	+3	4
Liechtenstein	2	1	0	1	0	1	-1	1
Malta	2	1	0	1	0	2	-2	1

28 February 1994	Albania	1-0	Liechtenstein
02 March 1994	Albania	2-0	Malta

=== Group A ===
Team	Pld	W	D	L	GF	GA	GD	Pts
Belarus	3	1	2	0	3	2	+1	5
Austria	3	1	2	0	3	2	+1	5
Spain	3	1	1	1	5	2	+3	4
Albania	3	0	1	2	1	6	−5	1

26 April 1994

Austria	1–0	Albania

Oriel Park, Dundalk
Referee: Richard O'Hanlon (Republic of Ireland)

28 April 1994

Belarus	1–1	Albania

United Park, Drogheda
Referee: Brendan Shorte (Republic of Ireland)

30 April 1994

Albania	0–4	Spain
		Cabello 20'; Etxeberria 30', 51'; Rubén García 34'

Oriel Park, Dundalk
Referee: Knud Erik Fisker (Denmark)

=== 1995 UEFA European Under-16 Championship qualifying ===
==== Group 7 ====
Teams	Pld	W	D	L	GF	GA	GD	Pts
Austria	2	1	1	0	5	1	+4	3
Moldova	2	1	1	0	4	1	+3	3
Albania	2	0	0	2	0	7	-7	0

07 October 1994	Albania	0-3	Moldova
09 October 1994	Albania	0-4	Austria

=== 1996 UEFA European Under-16 Championship qualifying ===
==== Group 6 ====
Teams	Pld	W	D	L	GF	GA	GD	Pts
Croatia	2	3	0	0	7	0	+9	9
Belarus	3	2	0	1	3	4	-1	6
Russia	3	1	0	2	3	3	0	3
Albania	3	0	0	3	0	6	-6	0

17 September 1995	Croatia	3-0	Albania
19 September 1995	Belarus	1-0	Albania
21 September 1995	Albania	0-2	Russia

=== 1997 UEFA European Under-16 Championship qualifying ===
==== Group 2 ====
Teams	Pld	W	D	L	GF	GA	GD	Pts
Israel	2	2	0	0	6	1	+5	6
Albania	2	1	0	1	2	2	0	3
Yugoslavia	2	0	0	2	2	7	-5	0

06 March 1997	Albania	2-1	Yugoslavia
08 March 1997	Israel	1-0	Albania

=== Group 1 ===
Teams	GP	W	D	L	GF	GA	GD	Pts
Portugal	3	3	0	0	8	3	5	9
Italy	3	2	0	1	9	2	7	6
North Macedonia	3	1	0	2	3	7	−4	3
Albania	3	0	0	3	2	10	−8	0

2 March 1999	Albania	1–5	Italy	Ohrid, Republic of Macedonia
4 March 1999	Albania	0–1	North Macedonia	Ohrid, Republic of Macedonia
6 March 1999	Portugal	4–1	Albania	Ohrid, Republic of Macedonia

=== 2000 UEFA European Under-16 Championship qualifying ===
==== Group 4 ====
Teams	Pld	W	D	L	GF	GA	GD	Pts
Romania	2	2	0	0	5	0	+5	6
Macedonia	2	1	0	1	2	4	-2	3
Albania	2	0	0	2	1	4	-3	0

22 September 1999	Macedonia	2-1	Albania
24 September 1999	Albania	0-2	Romania

=== 2001 UEFA European Under-16 Championship qualifying ===
==== Group 8 ====
Teams	Pld	W	D	L	GF	GA	GD	Pts
Romania	2	2	0	0	9	0	+9	6
Georgia	2	1	0	1	1	5	-4	3
Albania	2	0	0	2	0	5	-5	0

06 October 2000	Albania	0-4	Romania
08 October 2000	Georgia	1-0	Albania

== Players ==
=== Current squad ===
COACH: Ervin Bulku

The following players participated in the 2022 UEFA Development Tournament against Northern Ireland, Luxembourg and Peru on April 9, 2022, to April 14, 2022, and is being held in Albania.

Caps and goals as of 9 May 2021.

No.	Pos.	Player	Date of birth (age)	Caps	Goals	Club
1	GK	Mark Topollaj	25 November 2007 (age 18)	0	0	(Italian Football Federation) Hellas Verona
2	GK	Kristian Jashari	6 July 2006 (age 20)	0	0	(Italian Football Federation) Sassuolo
3	GK	Alain Taho	1 January 2007 (age 19)	0	0	(Italian Football Federation) Inter
4	DF	Davide Avdullari	13 January 2008 (age 18)	0	0	(Italian Football Federation) Hellas Verona
5	DF	Adi Kurti	17 January 2006 (age 20)	4	0	(Albanian Football Federation) Pepa
6	DF	Ergi Çela	14 March 2006 (age 20)	4	0	(Albanian Football Federation) Teuta
7	DF	Egert Selmani	28 January 2006 (age 20)	3	0	(Albanian Football Federation) Vllaznia
8	DF	Ergi Bastari	23 July 2006 (age 20)	0	0	(Albanian Football Federation) Internacional
9	DF	Ernesto Bakiu	15 January 2006 (age 20)	0	0	(Albanian Football Federation) Teuta
10	DF	Jetmir Laze	22 July 2007 (age 19)	3	0	(Albanian Football Federation) Skënderbeu
11	DF	Alion Damini	21 January 2006 (age 20)	4	0	(Albanian Football Federation) Teuta
12	MF	Matteo Dashi	22 January 2007 (age 19)	0	0	(The Football Association) Crystal Palace
13	MF	Andri Frashëri	10 January 2006 (age 20)	0	0	(United States Soccer Federation) Cedar Stars
14	MF	Klaus Kashari	11 October 2006 (age 20)	3	0	(Albanian Football Federation) Pepa
15	MF	Jordi Jaku	27 March 2006 (age 20)	4	0	(Albanian Football Federation) Shënkolli
16	MF	Glenis Belloj	30 May 2006 (age 20)	4	0	(Albanian Football Federation) Internacional
17	MF	Dean Vraniçi	2 January 2006 (age 20)	0	0	(Italian Football Federation) Südtirol
18	FW	Dejvi Metaj	27 September 2006 (age 20)	4	1	(Albanian Football Federation) Dinamo
19	FW	Ariel Krajka	27 September 2006 (age 20)	0	0	(Albanian Football Federation) Tirana
20	FW	John Jaku	6 November 2006 (age 20)	0	0	(United States Soccer Federation) Columbus Crew
21	FW	Ersi Bode	14 February 2006 (age 20)	4	1	(Royal Dutch Football Association) ADO Den Haag
22	FW	Matias Gici	18 May 2007 (age 19)	0	0	(Italian Football Federation) Venezia
23	FW	Flavio Sulejmani	20 March 2006 (age 20)	0	0	(Italian Football Federation) Perugia

=== Coaching staff ===
Current coaching staff:

Position	Name
Head coach	(Albania) Ervin Bulku
Assistant coach	(Albania) Agron Kërçova
Goalkeeping coach	(Albania) Elvis Kotorri
Physiotherapist	(Albania) Sabri Nurçe
Team doctor	(Albania) Adriatik Shahini
Athletic trainer	(Albania) Ardi Bekteshi
Video analyst	(Albania) Edon Beliu
Team manager	(Albania) Eno Xhaferraj

== Competitive record ==
=== UEFA European Under-16 Championship Record ===
UEFA European Under-16 Championship record								UEFA European Under-16 Championship Qualification						
Year	Round	Pld	W	D *	L	GF	GA	Position	Pld	W	D *	L	GF	GA
(Italy) 1982	Did not participate													
(West Germany) 1984	Did not participate													
(Hungary) 1985	Did not participate													
(Greece) 1986	Did not participate													
(France) 1987	Did not participate													
(Spain) 1988	Did not participate													
(Denmark) 1989	Did not participate													
(East Germany) 1990	Did not participate													
(Switzerland) 1991	Did not qualify							Qualifying round 2/2	2	0	0	2	1	3
(Cyprus) 1992	Did not qualify							Qualifying round 2/2	1	0	0	1	1	8
(Turkey) 1993	Did not qualify							Qualifying round 2/2	2	1	0	1	2	3
(Republic of Ireland) 1994	Group stage	3	0	1	2	1	6	Qualifying round 1/3	2	2	0	0	3	0
(Belgium) 1995	Did not qualify							Qualifying round 3/3	2	0	0	2	0	7
(Austria) 1996	Did not qualify							Qualifying round 4/4	3	0	0	3	0	6
(Germany) 1997	Did not qualify							Qualifying round 2/3	2	1	0	1	2	2
(Scotland) 1998	Did not participate													
(Czech Republic) 1999	Did not qualify							Qualifying round 4/4	3	0	0	3	2	10
(Israel) 2000	Did not qualify							Qualifying round 3/3	2	0	0	2	1	4
(England) 2001	Did not qualify							Qualifying round 3/3	2	0	0	2	0	5
Total: 1/19	Best: Group stage	3	0	1	2	1	6	Total	21	4	0	17	12	48

*Denotes draws include knockout matches decided on penalty kicks.

== See also ==
- Albania national football team
- Albania national under-23 football team
- Albania national under-21 football team
- Albania national under-20 football team
- Albania national under-19 football team
- Albania national under-18 football team
- Albania national under-17 football team
- Albania national under-15 football team
- Albania national youth football team
- Albania national football team results
- Albanian Superliga
- Football in Albania
- List of Albania international footballers
