= Edoardo Pazzagli =

Italian footballer (born 1989)

Personal information
- Date of birth: 11 April 1989 (age 37)
- Place of birth: Florence, Italy
- Height: 1.90 m (6 ft 3 in)
- Position: Goalkeeper

Youth career
- Fiorentina

Senior career*
Years	Team	Apps	(Gls)
2008–2010	Fiorentina	0	(0)
2008–2009	→ Prato (loan)	10	(0)
2009–2010	→ Andria (loan)	16	(0)
2010–2011	Prato	44	(0)
2011–2012	Fiorentina	0	(0)
2012–2015	AC Milan	0	(0)
2012–2013	→ Monza (loan)	18	(0)
2013–2014	→ Ascoli (loan)	29	(0)
2014–2015	→ Pistoiese (loan)	21	(0)
2015	→ Lucchese (loan)	7	(0)
2016	Massese	1	(0)

International career
2005–2006	Italy U-17	9	(0)
2006	Italy U-18	2	(0)
2006–2007	Italy U-19	4	(0)
- * Club domestic league appearances and goals

Edoardo Pazzagli (born 11 April 1989) is an Italian former professional footballer who played as a goalkeeper. Pazzagli spent most of his professional career on loan at Serie C (Lega Pro) divisions. He also represented Italy at youth levels.

== Club career ==
=== Fiorentina ===
Pazzagli was a youth product of Fiorentina. Pazzagli became the U-20 side's first choice in the 2006–07 season, ahead of Paolo Pincio. Pazzagli was also named in the B List of the senior squad for the 2007–08 UEFA Cup. That season his was the first team's fourth keeper (and the senior side's third keeper in Europe), behind Sébastien Frey, Cristiano Lupatelli and Vlada Avramov (who was not listed in UEFA Cup squad). His starting role in the domestic youth league was taken by Andrea Seculin in January 2008.

Pazzagli officially graduated from the Fiorentina youth sector at age 19. Pazzagli was loaned to Prato for the 2008–09 season, which was followed by a spell with Andria in the 2009–10 season.

In January 2010 he left for Prato on a co-ownership deal, for a peppercorn fee of €500.

In June 2011 he returned to Florence. His father, Andrea, died in July 2011 and was also a professional goalkeeper. Edoardo Pazzagli was the third choice keeper of la Viola, wearing the number 60 shirt.

=== AC Milan ===
Pazzagli's contract with La Viola was expired on 30 June 2012. In the same transfer window, he joined his father's former club AC Milan on a free transfer, but after spending the pre-season with the team he was sent on loan to Lega Pro Seconda Divisione side Monza on 30 August 2012. Pazzagli wore number 60 shirt in the pre-season for Milan.

In the following years he played on loan for Lega Pro Prima Divisione (just Lega Pro in 2014–15 season) clubs Ascoli, Pistoiese and Lucchese, and was later released by Milan in 2015.

In July–August 2015, Pazzagli was trained with other free agent in a training camp by Italian Footballers' Association (AIC). He also represented AIC against Italy national under-21 football B team (B Italia) in August, as first choice keeper.

Pazzagli had a brief spell with Serie D club Massese in 2016. He was released in April 2016.

== International career ==
Pazzagli made his debut for Italy under-17 side on 1 October 2005, in 2006 UEFA European Under-17 Football Championship qualification. He was the backup of Riccardo Delfino in the first two matches in that round. Pazzagli became the starting keeper in the elite round, ahead of Eros Corradini. Coached by Antonio Rocca, Italy U17 finished as the runner-up in the elite round, failing to qualify to the finals.

Pazzagli was subsequently directly promoted to the U-19 side in the 2006–07 season, and played in the 2007 UEFA European Under-19 Football Championship elite qualification in June 2007, ahead of Ugo Gabrieli in the first two matches. Pazzagli also played two friendly matches for the U-18 side in the same season.

Pazzagli was not selected by coach Francesco Rocca to the 2008 edition of the U-19 final tournament, nor in the qualifying rounds. Instead he was picked by the feeder team of the Italian U-21 side, the Italy U-20 team by the coach Massimo Piscedda in the second half of 2007–08 season. However, Pazzagli did not make his U-20 debut.

Since leaving the youth system of Fiorentina in 2008, Pazzagli did not win any official caps either. Pazzagli played an unofficial friendly against Serie D Best Eleven in June 2009, for the Italian "U-19" team as an overage player (the team was coached by Piscedda, who was appointed as the coach of the U-18 and U-19 team in 2008. But the squad for that match, consisted of U-20 players such as Pazzagli). Most of the players of that inferior U20 squad, did receive call-up from F.Rocca for the 2009 FIFA U-20 World Cup, including Pazzagli.
