= 2006 UEFA European Under-17 Championship elite round =

2006 UEFA U-17 Championship elite round was the second round of qualifications for the main tournament of UEFA U-17 Championship 2006. England, Spain, and France automatically qualified for this round. The winners of each group joined hosts Luxembourg at the main tournament.

== Matches ==
=== Group 1 ===
Teams	GP	W	D	L	GF	GA	GD	Pts
Germany	3	2	1	0	9	1	8	7
Netherlands	3	2	1	0	5	2	3	7
Northern Ireland	3	1	0	2	4	9	-5	3
Finland	3	0	0	3	2	8	-6	0

24 March	Germany	4–0	Northern Ireland	Boxmeer, Netherlands
	Finland	0–1	Netherlands	Tegelen, Netherlands
26 March	Germany	1–1	Netherlands	Gemert, Netherlands
	Northern Ireland	3–2	Finland	Venray, Netherlands
28 March	Finland	0–4	Germany	Tegelen, Netherlands
	Netherlands	3–1	Northern Ireland	Venray, Netherlands

=== Group 2 ===
Teams	GP	W	D	L	GF	GA	GD	Pts
Hungary	3	2	1	0	9	1	8	7
Portugal	3	1	2	0	5	4	1	5
Ukraine	3	0	2	1	3	7	-4	2
Sweden	3	0	1	2	2	7	-5	1

26 March	Hungary	1–1	Portugal	Viseu, Portugal
	Sweden	1–1	Ukraine	Santa Comba Dão, Portugal
28 March	Hungary	4–0	Ukraine	Mangualde, Portugal
	Portugal	2–1	Sweden	Penalva do Castelo, Portugal
30 March	Sweden	0–4	Hungary	Viseu, Portugal
	Ukraine	2–2	Portugal	Nelas, Portugal

=== Group 3 ===
Teams	GP	W	D	L	GF	GA	GD	Pts
Czech Republic	3	2	0	1	4	3	1	6
France	3	1	2	0	4	2	2	5
Denmark	3	1	1	1	1	2	-1	4
Turkey	3	0	1	2	1	3	-2	1

29 March	France	3–1	Czech Republic	Antalya, Turkey
	Turkey	0–1	Denmark	Antalya, Turkey
31 March	France	0–0	Denmark	Antalya, Turkey
	Czech Republic	1–0	Turkey	Antalya, Turkey
2 April	Turkey	1–1	France	Antalya, Turkey
	Denmark	0–2	Czech Republic	Antalya, Turkey

=== Group 4 ===
Teams	GP	W	D	L	GF	GA	GD	Pts
Belgium	3	2	1	0	9	3	6	7
Poland	3	2	0	1	5	3	2	6
Switzerland	3	1	1	1	6	4	2	4
Slovakia	3	0	0	3	1	11	-10	0

26 March	Switzerland	3–0	Slovakia	Zielona Góra, Poland
	Poland	0–2	Belgium	Krosno Odrzańskie, Poland
28 March	Switzerland	3–3	Belgium	Zielona Góra, Poland
	Slovakia	1–4	Poland	Zielona Góra, Poland
30 March	Poland	1–0	Switzerland	Zielona Góra, Poland
	Belgium	4–0	Slovakia	Krosno Odrzańskie, Poland

=== Group 5 ===
Teams	GP	W	D	L	GF	GA	GD	Pts
Spain	3	2	1	0	6	1	5	7
Wales	3	1	1	1	5	5	0	4
Cyprus	3	1	1	1	3	3	0	4
Moldova	3	0	1	2	3	8	-5	1

23 March	Spain	1–1	Cyprus	Paralimni, Cyprus
	Moldova	3–3	Wales	Larnaca, Cyprus
25 March	Spain	2–0	Wales	Larnaca, Cyprus
	Cyprus	2–0	Moldova	Paralimni, Cyprus
27 March	Moldova	0–3	Spain	Larnaca, Cyprus
	Wales	2–0	Cyprus	Larnaca, Cyprus

=== Group 6 ===
Teams	GP	W	D	L	GF	GA	GD	Pts
Serbia and Montenegro	3	2	0	1	5	2	3	6
Republic of Ireland	3	1	1	1	5	4	1	4
Israel	3	1	1	1	4	5	-1	4
Romania	3	1	0	2	3	6	-3	3

27 March	Serbia and Montenegro	1–2	Israel	Bray, Ireland
	Republic of Ireland	4–0	Romania	Dublin, Ireland
29 March	Serbia and Montenegro	1–0	Romania	Dublin, Ireland
	Israel	1–1	Republic of Ireland	Dublin, Ireland
31 March	Republic of Ireland	0–3	Serbia and Montenegro	Dublin, Ireland
	Romania	3–1	Israel	Bray, Ireland

=== Group 7 ===
Teams	GP	W	D	L	GF	GA	GD	Pts
Russia	3	2	1	0	7	1	6	7
Italy	3	1	2	0	5	2	3	5
England	3	0	2	1	3	4	-1	2
Bulgaria	3	0	1	2	0	8	-8	1

28 March	England	2–2	Italy	Huddersfield, England
	Russia	5–0	Bulgaria	Worksop, England
30 March	England	0–0	Bulgaria	Barnsley, England
	Italy	0–0	Russia	Leeds, England
1 April	Russia	2–1	England	Glanford Park, Scunthorpe, England
	Bulgaria	0–3	Italy	Stocksbridge, England
