= Nicolae Bunea =

Moldovan footballer and manager

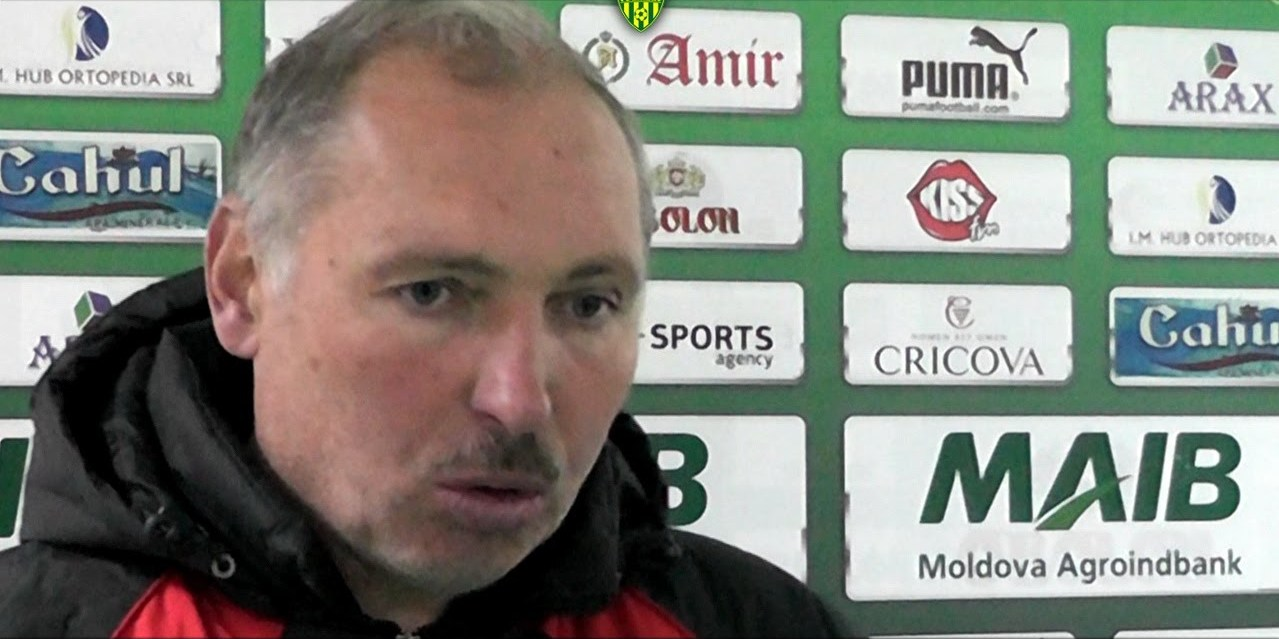
- Bunea in 2014

Personal information
- Date of birth: 21 December 1963 (age 62)
- Place of birth: Bălți, Moldavian SSR, Soviet Union
- Height: 1.69 m (5 ft 6 1/2 in)

Team information
- Current team: Moldova U17 (head coach)

Managerial career
- Years: Team
- 2006–2008: Nistru Otaci
- 2009–2012: Olimpia Bălți
- 2013: Moldova U17
- 2013–2014: Olimpia Bălți
- 2024: Moldova U15
- 2025–2026: Moldova U16
- 2026–: Moldova U17
- ‡ National team caps and goals as of 6 June 2026

Nicolae Bunea (born 21 December 1963) is a Moldovan professional football manager and former footballer. He is the head coach of the Moldova national under-17 team.
