= Georgia national under-17 football team =

Georgia Under-17
- Nickname(s): ჯვაროსნები Jvarosnebi (Crusaders)
- Association: Georgian Football Federation
- Confederation: UEFA
- Head coach: Aleksandre Kobakhidze
- Most caps: Zuriko Davitashvili Khvicha Kvaratskhelia (28 games)
- Top scorer: Zuriko Davitashvili (24 goals)
- Home stadium: Mikheil Meskhi Stadium (main) Ramaz Shengelia Stadium (2nd venue)
- FIFA code: GEO
First colours	Second colours	Third colours

European Championship
- Appearances: 3 (first in 1997)
- Best result: Semifinals (2012)
- Website: nakrebi.ge

The Georgia national under-17 football team represents the country of Georgia in association football at the under-17 youth level, and is controlled by the Georgian Football Federation.

The team is for Georgian players aged 17 or under at the start of a two-year European Under-17 Football Championship cycle, so players can be up to 19 years old.

== Competition history ==
Prior to Georgia's independence in 1991 Georgian players were eligible for selection to the Soviet Union U-16 team. Following the dissolution of the Soviet Union, the Georgian Football Federation was admitted to UEFA as a full member in 1992, and the team played their first competitive matches in the first phase of the qualifying tournament for the 1994 European U-16 Championship. Georgia U-17's competitive debut came on 21 October 1993 against Switzerland U-17 and they finished their first qualifying campaign as 3rd out of 3 teams, behind Switzerland and Slovenia.

The team's first successful campaign was for the 1997 European U-16 Championship, in which they failed to progress from the group stage after three defeats to Hungary, Italy and Belgium. Their second appearance came in the first tournament staged following UEFA's renaming of youth levels in the 2002 European U-17 Championship, in which they were knocked out in the quarter-final by later champions Switzerland U-17s. In 2012 Georgia made it through to the semi-finals but lost 2–0 to the Netherlands.

=== Georgia Under 17 at European Championships ===
Year	Round	W	D	L	GS	GA	Players
(Germany) 1997	Group	0	0	3	7	16	Squad
(Denmark) 2002	1/4 f.	1	2	1	4	6	Squad
(Slovenia) 2012	1/2 f.	1	1	2	2	4	Squad

== European Under 17 Championship Qualifiers Host in Georgia ==
Country	Round	Group
(Georgia (country))	Euro 2000 qualifying round	Group 2
(Georgia (country))	Euro 2002 elite round	Group 10
(Georgia (country))	Euro 2011 qualifying round	Group 3
(Georgia (country))	Euro 2012 elite round	Group 3
(Georgia (country))	Euro 2013 qualifying round	Group 13
(Georgia (country))	Euro 2014 qualifying round	Group 11
(Georgia (country))	Euro 2015 qualifying round	Group 2
(Georgia (country))	Euro 2016 elite round	Group 3
(Georgia (country))	Euro 2018 qualifying round	Group 13
(Georgia (country))	Euro 2023 qualifying round	Group 3
(Georgia (country))	Euro 2024 qualifying round	Group 1
(Georgia (country))	Euro 2024 elite round	Group 6
(Georgia (country))	Euro 2026 qualifying round	Group 14

== Current squad ==
- The following players were called up for international friendlies against Romania and Turkey.
- Match dates: 6 and 9 June 2026
- Location: Buftea, Romania

Caps and goals correct as of 16 April 2026, after the UEFA European U17 Championship Group B3 qualifying match against Wales.

No.	Pos.	Player	Date of birth (age)	Caps	Goals	Club
	GK	Shota Metonidze		0	0	(Georgian Football Federation) Torpedo
	GK	Elias Muller		0	0	(German Football Association) SV Wacker Burghausen
	DF	Andria Potskhveria	January 26, 2010 (age 16)	3	0	(Georgian Football Federation) Inter Academy
	DF	Nikoloz Tomaevi		0	0	(Georgian Football Federation) Dinamo Tbilisi
	DF	Nikoloz Kobzonadze		0	0	(Georgian Football Federation) Dinamo Tbilisi
	DF	Nikoloz Ughrelidze		0	0	(Georgian Football Federation) Iberia 1999
	DF	Ilia Kvaratskhelia		0	0	(Georgian Football Federation) Celero
	DF	Sandro Kharazi		0	0	(Georgian Football Federation) Inter Academy
	DF	Demetre Chkhartishvili		0	0	(Georgian Football Federation) Inter Academy
	DF	Gabriel Gogua		0	0	(Georgian Football Federation) Dinamo Tbilisi
	MF	Aleksandre Chikovani		0	0	(Georgian Football Federation) Inter Academy
	MF	Davit Macharashvili		0	0	(Georgian Football Federation) Dinamo Tbilisi
	MF	Andria Ochigava		0	0	(Georgian Football Federation) Dinamo Tbilisi
	MF	Erekle Kakulia		0	0	(Georgian Football Federation) Celero
	MF	Demetre Kurasbediani		0	0	(Georgian Football Federation) Dinamo Tbilisi
	MF	Tornike Kvaratskhelia	July 2, 2010 (age 16)	0	0	(Georgian Football Federation) Dinamo Tbilisi
	MF	Jumber Dumbadze		0	0	(Georgian Football Federation) Portus Batumi
	MF	Kaki Kochuashvili		0	0	(Georgian Football Federation) Iberia 1999
	FW	Levan Chikaidze		0	0	(Georgian Football Federation) Dinamo Tbilisi
	FW	Nikoloz Sakhvadze		0	0	(Georgian Football Federation) Dinamo Tbilisi

== Statistics ==
=== Most appearances ===
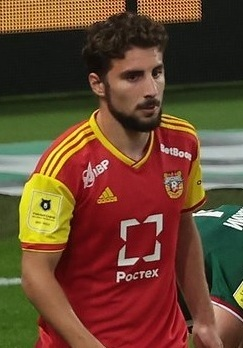
With 14 caps, Zuriko Davitashvili is the most capped player of the U17 team in UEFA competitive matches

Last updated: 24 April 2026

#	Name	Career	Caps
1	Zuriko Davitashvili	2016–2018	14
2	Anzor Mekvabishvili	2016–2018	12
2	Saba Khvadagiani	2018–2020	12
4	Iva Gelashvili	2016–2018	11
4	Khvicha Kvaratskhelia	2016–2018	11
4	Luka Kharshiladze	2017–2019	11
4	Giorgi Gvasalia	2023–2024	11
4	Giorgi Guliashvili	2016–2018	11
4	Vakhtang Salia	2022–2024	11
4	Giorgi Abuashvili	2019–2020	11
4	George Chubinidze	2023–2024	11

Source: worldfootball.net

=== Record against opponents ===
Last updated: 24 April 2026

Opponent	Wins	Draws	Losses	Goals
Albania	1	1	0	5–0
Andorra	1	1	0	1–0
Armenia	4	0	0	15–5
Austria	0	1	6	5–14
Azerbaijan	6	3	3	12–7
Belarus	6	0	4	20–15
Belgium	3	3	2	19–16
Bosnia and Herzegovina	1	0	1	3–2
Bulgaria	3	1	1	11–6
Croatia	1	0	2	4–9
Cyprus	2	1	0	7–4
Czech Republic	2	0	0	3–1
Denmark	2	0	3	8–14
England	1	1	1	4–7
Estonia	1	0	2	2–3
Faroe Islands	1	0	0	2–0
France	0	1	1	1–3
Finland	0	0	5	0–8
Germany	0	1	6	2–15
Greece	0	1	1	1–2
Hungary	2	1	1	5–4
Iceland	3	1	1	7–6
Iran	2	2	2	6–10
Republic of Ireland	1	1	1	5–4
Israel	1	1	3	3–10
Italy	0	0	2	0–3
Japan	1	0	1	6–5
Kazakhstan	3	3	1	28–11
Kyrgyzstan	2	0	0	16–0
Latvia	3	1	3	12–13
Liechtenstein	1	0	0	3–0
Lithuania	2	2	4	9–18
Luxembourg	3	0	0	10–1
North Macedonia	3	0	0	15–2
Moldova	7	1	0	30–8
Montenegro	1	0	0	2–0
Netherlands	0	0	4	1–7
Northern Ireland	3	0	0	7–3
Norway	1	2	2	2–10
Poland	2	2	5	11–18
Portugal	0	1	1	0–2
Romania	1	1	2	4–4
Russia	0	0	3	2–10
San Marino	2	0	0	7–2
Scotland	2	0	1	6–7
Serbia	0	0	3	0–6
Slovakia	2	2	4	8–18
Slovenia	0	0	1	1–2
Spain	0	1	1	2–7
Switzerland	0	0	1	0–3
Sweden	0	0	3	0–7
Tajikistan	0	0	1	1–2
Turkey	1	1	3	8–13
Ukraine	3	1	9	13–26
Uzbekistan	1	0	1	2–4
Wales	0	0	2	2–6
Yugoslavia	0	0	1	0–2

== See also ==
- Georgia national football team
- Georgia national under-21 football team
- Georgia national under-19 football team
