= Slovakia national under-16 football team =

National U-16 association football team

Slovakia U-16
- Association: Slovenský futbalový zväz
- Confederation: UEFA (Europe)
- Head coach: Samuel Slovák
- FIFA code: SVK
First colours	Second colours

The Slovakia national under-16 football team, controlled by the Slovak Football Association, is Slovakia's national under 16 football team and is considered to be a feeder team for the Slovakia U17 team.

== Current squad ==
The following players were named in the squad for the 2023 UEFA Under-16 Development Tournament in May.

Caps and goals are correct as of 20 November 2022, after the match against Austria.

No.	Pos.	Player	Date of birth (age)	Caps	Goals	Club
1	GK	Adrián Malovec	8 November 2007 (age 19)	2	0	(Slovak Football Association) Slovan Bratislava
21	GK	Sebastian Zajac	31 October 2007 (age 19)	1	0	(Polish Football Association) Podbeskidzie Bielsko-Biała
	DF	Matúš Pavlík	31 October 2007 (age 19)	4	0	(Slovak Football Association) Žilina
	DF	Martin Meško	19 January 2007 (age 19)	2	0	(Slovak Football Association) Žilina
	DF	Lucas Benjamin Németh	9 May 2007 (age 19)	2	0	(Slovak Football Association) Slovan Bratislava
	DF	Nicolas Sagan	30 December 2007 (age 18)	2	0	(Slovak Football Association) Petržalka
	DF	Martin Valigura	16 March 2007 (age 19)	2	0	(Slovak Football Association) Ružomberok
	DF	Alex Barilla	13 March 2007 (age 19)	1	0	(Slovak Football Association) Petržalka
	DF	Barnabas Ferenczi	7 January 2007 (age 19)	0	0	(Slovak Football Association) DAC Dunajská Streda
23	DF	Martin Turanský		0	0	(Slovak Football Association) Spartak Trnava
	MF	Milan Polča	27 February 2007 (age 19)	4	0	(Slovak Football Association) Košice
	MF	Šimon Vlna	11 April 2007 (age 19)	4	0	(Austrian Football Association) Burgenland
	MF	Daniel Osman		2	0	(Royal Belgian Football Association) Standard Liège
	MF	Kristián Pavol Stručka	1 April 2007 (age 19)	2	0	(Slovak Football Association) Žilina
	MF	Martin Bačík	7 March 2007 (age 19)	0	0	(Slovak Football Association) Ružomberok
	MF	Filip Trello		0	0	(Slovak Football Association) Spartak Trnava
	FW	Dávid Bukovský	27 August 2007 (age 19)	2	0	(Slovak Football Association) Spartak Trnava
	FW	Patrik Jevoš	20 August 2007 (age 19)	2	0	(Slovak Football Association) Ružomberok
	FW	Samuel Kováčik		0	0	(Slovak Football Association) Žilina
	FW	Denis Valko	13 April 2007 (age 19)	2	0	(Slovak Football Association) DAC Dunajská Streda

== See also ==
- Slovakia national football team
- Slovakia national under-21 football team
- Slovakia national under-19 football team
- Slovakia national under-18 football team
- Slovakia national under-17 football team
