= Faroe Islands national under-17 football team =

Faroe Islands U17
- Association: Faroe Islands Football Association
- Confederation: UEFA (Europe)
- Head coach: Christian Høgni Jacobsen
- Home stadium: Tórsvøllur and Svangaskarð
- FIFA code: FRO
First colours	Second colours

FIFA U-17 World Cup
- Appearances: 0 (first in -)
- Best result: -

European Championship
- Appearances: 1 (first in 2017)
- Best result: Group Stage (2017)

The Faroe Islands U-17 National Team represents the Faroe Islands at under-17 age level and is controlled by the Faroe Islands Football Association.

The team most recently took part in the 2017 UEFA Under-17 Championship qualifiers in 2017, qualifying to the Elite Round for the first time, and then qualifying to the 2017 UEFA European Under-17 Championship final tournament.

== History in the UEFA European Under-17 Championship ==
Between 1982-2001 this was an under-16 championship.

Year	Result	GP	W	D	L	GS	GA	GD
(Italy) 1982	did not enter							
(West Germany) 1984	did not enter							
(Hungary) 1985	did not enter							
(Greece) 1986	did not enter							
(France) 1987	did not enter							
(Spain) 1988	did not enter							
(Denmark) 1989	did not enter							
(East Germany) 1990	did not enter							
(Switzerland) 1991	did not enter							
(Cyprus) 1992	did not enter							
(Turkey) 1993	did not enter							
(Republic of Ireland) 1994	did not enter							
(Belgium) 1995	did not enter							
(Austria) 1996	did not enter							
(Germany) 1997	Qualifying stage							
(Scotland) 1998	Qualifying stage							
(Czech Republic) 1999	Qualifying stage							
(Israel) 2000	Qualifying stage							
(England) 2001	Qualifying stage							
(Denmark) 2002	Qualifying stage							
(Portugal) 2003	First qualifying stage							
(France) 2004	First qualifying stage							
(Italy) 2005	First qualifying stage							
(Luxembourg) 2006	First qualifying stage							
(Belgium) 2007	First qualifying stage							
(Turkey) 2008	First qualifying stage							
(Germany) 2009	First qualifying stage							
(Liechtenstein) 2010	First qualifying stage							
(Serbia) 2011	First qualifying stage							
(Slovenia) 2012	First qualifying stage							
(Slovakia) 2013	First qualifying stage							
(Malta) 2014	First qualifying stage							
(Bulgaria) 2015	First qualifying stage							
(Azerbaijan) 2016	First qualifying stage							
(Croatia) 2017	16th	3	0	0	3	0	13	-13
(England) 2018	First qualifying stage							
(Republic of Ireland) 2019	First qualifying stage							
(Estonia) 2020	Cancelled due to COVID-19 pandemic							
(Cyprus) 2021	Cancelled due to COVID-19 pandemic							
(Israel) 2022	First qualifying stage							
(Hungary) 2023	did not qualify							
(Cyprus) 2024	did not qualify							
(Albania) 2025	did not qualify							
(Estonia) 2026	did not qualify							
(Latvia) 2027	did not qualify							
(Lithuania) 2028	To be determined							
(Moldova) 2029	To be determined							
Total	1/36	3	0	0	3	0	13	-13

== 2026 UEFA Under-17 Championship Qualifiers ==
=== Group 6 ===
Pos	Team	Pld	W	D	L	GF	GA	GD	Pts	Qualification
1	Republic of Ireland	3	3	0	0	7	0	+7	9	Round 2 League A
2	Austria (H)	3	2	0	1	9	6	+3	6	Round 2 League A
3	Faroe Islands	3	1	0	2	4	10	−6	3	Round 2 League B
4	Kosovo	3	0	0	3	5	9	−4	0	Round 2 League B

Source: UEFA
Rules for classification: Tiebreakers
(H) Hosts
8 October 2025
18:00

Austria	5–1	Faroe Islands
Aleksic 19' (pen.); M'Bock 52'; Mijatovic 65'; Schreiber 81'; Berger 88'	Report	Anghel 77'

Wiener Neustadt Arena, Wiener Neustadt
Attendance: 358
Referee: Rares Vidican (Romania)

11 October 2025
12:00

Republic of Ireland	3–0	Faroe Islands
Murray 18'; Mahon 48' (pen.); Murphy 53'	Report

Lindabrunn, Enzesfeld-Lindabrunn
Attendance: 100
Referee: Márton Rúsz (Hungary)

14 October 2025
15:00

Faroe Islands	3–2	Kosovo
Anghel 14'; Danielsen 27'; Joensen 59'	Report	Llugaxhiu 34'; Mustafa 90+5' (pen.)

Lindabrunn, Enzesfeld-Lindabrunn
Attendance: 103
Referee: Anton Lashuk (Belarus)

=== Elite round ===
==== Group B1 ====
Pos	Team	Pld	W	D	L	GF	GA	GD	Pts	Promotion
1	Israel	3	3	0	0	9	1	+8	9	Promoted to League A for the Round 1 of the 2028 UEFA European Under-19 Championship qualification
2	England (H)	3	2	0	1	6	3	+3	6	
3	Faroe Islands	3	1	0	2	2	8	−6	3	
4	Estonia	3	0	0	3	1	6	−5	0	

Source: UEFA
Rules for classification: Qualification tiebreakers
25 March 2026
15:00 (14:00 UTC+00:00)

England	3–0	Faroe Islands
Kavuma-McQueen 11', 19'; Higgins 90+1'	Report

St George's Park National Football Centre, Burton upon Trent
Referee: Bálint Kišš (Slovakia)

28 March 2026
20:00 (19:00 UTC+00:00)

Faroe Islands	2–1	Estonia
Danielsen 45+1', 55'	Report	Kaares 45+3'

St George's Park National Football Centre, Burton upon Trent
Referee: Arnes Talic (Austria)

31 March 2026
14:00 (13:00 UTC+00:00)

Faroe Islands	0–4	Israel
	Report	Shushan 16' (pen.); Dadia 42'; Abihazira 58'; Ghanayim 79'

St George's Park National Football Centre, Burton upon Trent
Referee: Bálint Kišš (Slovakia)

== Current squad ==
The following players were called up for the 2027 UEFA European Under-17 Championship qualification matches against England, Estonia and Israel on 25, 28 and 31 March 2026.

Caps and goals correct as of 13 April 2025, after the match against Bulgaria

No.	Pos.	Player	Date of birth (age)	Caps	Goals	Club
1	GK	Nóa Joensen	2 February 2009 (age 17)	5	0	(Danish Football Association) Randers FC
12	GK	Dánjal Müller	3 December 2009 (age 16)	3	0	(Faroe Islands Football Association) KÍ
2	DF	Magnus Pauli Thomsen	3 August 2009 (age 17)	7	0	(Faroe Islands Football Association) EB/Streymur
3	DF	Djóni Øre	25 August 2009 (age 17)	6	0	(Faroe Islands Football Association) Víkingur
4	DF	Jóel Tróndargjógv	16 February 2009 (age 17)	6	1	(Faroe Islands Football Association) NSÍ Runavík
5	DF	Brestir Hultgren Magnussen	29 July 2009 (age 17)	0	0	(Faroe Islands Football Association) B36
6	DF	William Hansen	18 October 2010 (age 16)	9	0	(Danish Football Association) Hvidovre IF
10	DF	Jákup Kristiansson Poulsen	21 July 2009 (age 17)	8	0	(Danish Football Association) Esbjerg fB
13	DF	Dennis Anghel	21 October 2009 (age 17)	10	2	(Danish Football Association) Sønderjyske
7	MF	Jónas Samuelsen	29 January 2008 (age 18)	4	0	(Faroe Islands Football Association) B68
21	MF	Mathias Andersen	6 April 2009 (age 17)	4	0	(Faroe Islands Football Association) EB/Streymur
8	MF	Tummas Joensen	10 June 2009 (age 17)	8	1	(Faroe Islands Football Association) FC Suðuroy
14	MF	Rósing Toyt	11 July 2010 (age 16)	9	0	(Faroe Islands Football Association) Víkingur
15	MF	Markus Danielsen	30 January 2009 (age 17)	7	1	(Faroe Islands Football Association) NSÍ Runavík
17	MF	Edvard Falkenberg	27 November 2009 (age 16)	0	0	(Faroe Islands Football Association) HB
18	MF	Jåce Boulden	14 July 2011 (age 15)	1	0	(United States Soccer Federation) Montgomery United
9	FW	Axel Holm Simonsen	13 March 2009 (age 17)	1	0	(Faroe Islands Football Association) B36
11	FW	Bjarti Johansson Hansen	4 April 2009 (age 17)	1	0	(Faroe Islands Football Association) B36
16	FW	Markus Højgaard	10 September 2008 (age 18)	7	0	(Faroe Islands Football Association) Víkingur

== See also ==
- Faroe Islands men's national under-21 football team
- Faroe Islands men's national under-19 football team
- Faroe Islands women's national football team
- Faroe Islands women's national under-17 football team
