= 1997 UEFA European Under-16 Championship =

1997 UEFA Under-16 Championship
U-16-Fußball-Europameisterschaft 1997

Tournament details
- Host country: Germany
- Dates: 28 April – 10 May
- Teams: 16 (from 1 confederation)

Final positions
- Champions: Spain (4th title)
- Runners-up: Austria
- Third place: Germany
- Fourth place: Switzerland

Tournament statistics
- Matches played: 32
- Goals scored: 100 (3.13 per match)
- Top scorer(s): Juanjo Camacho (5 goals)

The 1997 UEFA European Under-16 Championship was the 15th edition of UEFA's European Under-16 Football Championship. Players born on or after 1 August 1980 were eligible to participate in this competition. Germany hosted the championship, during 28 April – 10 May 1997. 16 teams entered the competition, and Spain defeated Austria in the final to win the competition for the fourth time.

The games were held in Barsinghausen, Blankenburg, Braunschweig, Bremen, Bückeburg, Celle, Einbeck, Goslar, Hamburg, Hamelin, Hanover, Hettstedt, Hildesheim, Kiel, Lehrte, Lübeck, Lübtheen, Minden, Neukloster, Neustadt-Glewe, Nienburg/Weser, Norderstedt, Nordhausen, Polz, Rendsburg, Schönberg, Schwerin, Thale, Vöhrum and Wernigerode.

== Participants ==
- Austria
- Belgium
- Germany
- Georgia
- Hungary
- Iceland
- Israel
- Italy
- Northern Ireland
- Poland
- Slovakia
- Slovenia
- Spain
- Switzerland
- Turkey
- Ukraine

== Group stage ==
=== Group A ===
Team	Pld	W	D	L	GF	GA	GD	Pts
Germany	3	3	0	0	6	0	+6	9
Switzerland	3	2	0	1	5	5	0	6
Northern Ireland	3	1	0	2	3	4	−1	3
Israel	3	0	0	3	3	8	−5	0

28 April 1997

Germany	3–0	Israel

Hanover

28 April 1997

Switzerland	2–1	Northern Ireland

Einbeck

30 April 1997

Israel	1–2	Northern Ireland

Vöhrum

30 April 1997

Germany	2–0	Switzerland

Hamelin

2 May 1997

Northern Ireland	0–1	Germany

Bremen

2 May 1997

Israel	2–3	Switzerland

Barsinghausen

=== Group B ===
Team	Pld	W	D	L	GF	GA	GD	Pts
Spain	3	3	0	0	10	2	+8	9
Austria	3	1	0	2	4	4	0	3
Ukraine	3	1	0	2	5	9	−4	3
Poland	3	1	0	2	4	8	−4	3

28 April 1997

Poland	0–4	Austria

Nordhausen

28 April 1997

Spain	6–1	Ukraine

Hettstedt
Referee: Muhittin Boşat (Turkey)

30 April 1997

Poland	1–2	Spain

Blankenburg
Referee: Dieter Schoch (Switzerland)

30 April 1997

Austria	0–2	Ukraine

Goslar

2 May 1997

Austria	0–2	Spain

Wernigerode
Referee: Martin Ingvarsson (Sweden)

2 May 1997

Ukraine	2–3	Poland

Thale

=== Group C ===
Team	Pld	W	D	L	GF	GA	GD	Pts
Belgium	3	3	0	0	7	1	+6	9
Hungary	3	2	0	1	8	5	+3	6
Italy	3	1	0	2	6	6	0	3
Georgia	3	0	0	3	7	16	−9	0

28 April 1997

Hungary	6–3	Georgia

Polz

28 April 1997

Belgium	1–0	Italy

Schönberg

30 April 1997

Hungary	0–1	Belgium

Schwerin

30 April 1997

Georgia	3–5	Italy

Lübtheen

2 May 1997

Georgia	1–5	Belgium

Neukloster

2 May 1997

Italy	1–2	Hungary

Neustadt-Glewe

=== Group D ===
Team	Pld	W	D	L	GF	GA	GD	Pts
Turkey	3	3	0	0	7	0	+7	9
Slovakia	3	1	1	1	3	3	0	4
Iceland	3	1	0	2	2	5	−3	3
Slovenia	3	0	1	2	2	6	−4	1

28 April 1997

Turkey	2–0	Slovenia

Kiel

28 April 1997

Slovakia	1–0	Iceland

Norderstedt

30 April 1997

Turkey	1–0	Slovakia

St. Pauli

30 April 1997

Slovenia	0–2	Iceland

Lübeck

2 May 1997

Iceland	0–4	Turkey

Lurup

2 May 1997

Slovenia	2–2	Slovakia

Rendsburg

== Knockout stages ==
=== Quarterfinals ===
5 May 1997

Germany	3–1	Hungary

Hildesheim
Referee: Sorin Corpodean (Romania)

5 May 1997

Belgium	0–0	Switzerland
Penalties
	4–5

Nienburg

5 May 1997

Spain	3–1	Slovakia

Bückeberg
Referee: Dick van Egmond (Netherlands)

5 May 1997

Turkey	0–3	Austria

Stockerau

=== Semifinals ===
7 May 1997

Switzerland	0–0	Austria
Penalties
	5–6

Minden
Referee: Anton Genov (Bulgaria)

7 May 1997

Germany	1–2	Spain

Braunschweig
Referee: Martin Ingvarsson (Sweden)

=== Third Place Playoff ===
9 May 1997

Germany	3–1	Switzerland

Barsinghausen
Referee: Dick van Egmond (Netherlands)

=== Final ===
10 May 1997

Spain	0–0	Austria
Penalties
	5–4

Celle
Referee: Sorin Corpodean (Romania)
