= Armenia national under-17 football team =

National U-17 association football team

Armenia U-17
- Nickname: Ararat
- Association: Football Federation of Armenia
- Head coach: Aleksandr Petrosyan
- FIFA code: ARM
First colours	Second colours

First international
- Ukraine 9–0 Armenia (Debrecen, Hungary; 2 March 1995)

Biggest win
- Bulgaria 1–4 Armenia (Bulgaria; 24 October 2003); Armenia 4–1 Norway (England; 26 March 2004)

Biggest defeat
- Germany 10–1 Armenia (Manavgat, Turkey; 23 March 2017)

European Championship
- Appearances: 0

FIFA U-17 World Cup
- Appearances: 0

The Armenia national under-17 football team is the national under-17 youth football team of Armenia. The team is based mostly on the young players from the league and competes every year to qualify for the FIFA U-17 World Cup and the UEFA European Under-17 Championship. The team played its first match in 1993, Armenia having, until 1992, been part of the USSR.

== UEFA European Football Championship record ==
=== Under-16 format ===
Finals record		Qualification record							
Year	Result	Pos	Pld	W	D*	L	GF	GA	GD
(Republic of Ireland) 1994	did not qualify	3	2	0	0	2	0	12	-12
(Belgium) 1995	did not qualify	3	2	0	0	2	2	9	-7
(Austria) 1996	did not qualify	4	3	0	1	2	1	3	-2
(Germany) 1997	did not qualify	2	2	1	0	1	1	6	-5
(Scotland) 1998	did not qualify	4	3	0	0	3	1	15	-14
(Czech Republic) 1999	did not qualify	3	2	0	0	2	2	7	-5
(Israel) 2000	did not qualify	4	3	0	0	3	1	10	-9
(England) 2001	did not qualify	3	3	1	0	2	4	8	-4
Total	0/8	Best: 2	20	2	1	17	12	70	−58

=== Under-17 format ===
Finals record		Qualification record							
Year	Result	Pos	Pld	W	D*	L	GF	GA	GD
(Denmark) 2002	did not qualify	3	2	0	0	2	1	3	-2
(Portugal) 2003	did not qualify	4	3	0	1	2	4	6	-2
(France) 2004	Elite round	3	6	3	0	3	12	8	+4
(Italy) 2005	did not qualify	4	3	0	0	3	3	10	-7
(Luxembourg) 2006	did not qualify	4	3	0	0	3	2	14	-12
(Belgium) 2007	did not qualify	4	3	1	1	1	4	3	+1
(Turkey) 2008	did not qualify	4	3	0	0	3	2	10	-8
(Germany) 2009	did not qualify	4	3	0	1	2	0	3	-3
(Liechtenstein) 2010	did not qualify	4	3	0	1	2	3	11	-8
(Serbia) 2011	did not qualify	4	3	0	1	2	2	6	-4
(Slovenia) 2012	did not qualify	4	3	1	0	2	4	8	-4
(Slovakia) 2013	did not qualify	4	3	0	0	3	0	13	-13
(Malta) 2014	did not qualify	3	3	1	0	2	2	7	-5
(Bulgaria) 2015	did not qualify	4	3	0	0	3	0	9	-9
(Azerbaijan) 2016	did not qualify	3	3	0	1	2	1	13	-12
(Croatia) 2017	Elite round	4	6	1	1	4	5	26	-21
(England) 2018	did not qualify	3	3	0	0	3	0	14	-14
(Republic of Ireland) 2019	did not qualify	4	3	0	0	3	0	9	-9
(Estonia) ~~2020~~	Cancelled due to COVID-19 pandemic								
(Cyprus) ~~2021~~	Cancelled due to COVID-19 pandemic								
(Israel) 2022	did not qualify	4	3	0	0	3	0	14	-14
(Hungary) 2023	did not qualify	4	3	0	0	3	2	16	-14
(Cyprus) 2024	did not qualify	4	3	0	0	3	1	16	-15
(Albania) 2025	did not qualify	4	6	1	0	5	2	19	-17
(Estonia) 2026	did not qualify	4	3	0	0	3	1	5	-4
Total	0/23	Best: 3	77	8	7	62	51	243	−192

*Denotes draws include knockout matches decided on penalty kicks.

== Current squad ==
The following players were called up for the most recent fixtures in 2026 UEFA European Under-17 Championship qualification.

No.	Pos.	Player	Date of birth (age)	Club
12	GK	Samson Hakobyan	6 November 2009 (age 17)	(Football Federation of Armenia) Pyunik
1	GK	Arsen Mirabyan	27 February 2009 (age 17)	(Football Federation of Armenia) BKMA
2	DF	Seryozha Petrosyan	4 February 2009 (age 17)	(Football Federation of Armenia) Pyunik
3	DF	Armen Asatryan	24 August 2009 (age 17)	(Football Federation of Armenia) Avan Academy
4	DF	Tigran Ohanyan	8 April 2009 (age 17)	(Football Federation of Armenia) Avan Academy
5	DF	Vahan Aslanyan	18 July 2009 (age 17)	(Football Federation of Armenia) Avan Academy
6	DF	Suren Petrosyan	11 May 2009 (age 17)	(Football Federation of Armenia) Urartu
13	DF	Gor Sargsyan	2 June 2009 (age 17)	(Football Federation of Armenia) Pyunik
21	DF	Robert Hovakimyan	23 August 2010 (age 16)	(Football Federation of Armenia) Pyunik
23	DF	Zhirayr Grigoryan	11 August 2009 (age 17)	(Football Federation of Armenia) Avan Academy
7	MF	Rafayel Minasyan	11 September 2009 (age 17)	
8	MF	Aram Khachatryan	24 June 2009 (age 17)	(Football Federation of Armenia) Pyunik
18	MF	Artyom Hakobyan	16 November 2009 (age 16)	(Football Federation of Armenia) Pyunik
20	MF	Kiril Yedigaryan	27 June 2009 (age 17)	(Football Federation of Armenia) BKMA
22	MF	Andranik Ervandyan	4 March 2009 (age 17)	(Football Federation of Armenia) Pyunik
17	MF	Suren Harutyunyan	25 May 2009 (age 17)	(Football Federation of Armenia) Syunik
10	MF	Vachik Tumanyan	16 September 2009 (age 17)	(Russian Football Union) CSKA
9	FW	Arsen Arakelyan	2 February 2009 (age 17)	(Football Federation of Armenia) Urartu
11	FW	Mher Harutyunyan	22 July 2009 (age 17)	(Football Federation of Armenia) Shirak
19	FW	Vahe Tovmasyan	9 February 2009 (age 17)	(Football Federation of Armenia) Ararat Yerevan
