= Wales national under-17 football team =

National association football team

Wales Under-17
- Nickname: Young Dragons (Welsh: Dreigiau Ifanc)
- Association: Football Association of Wales
- Head coach: Adrian Harvie
First colours	Second colours

European Championship
- Appearances: 2 (first in 2023)
- Best result: Group Stage (2023, 2024)

The Wales national under-17 football team is the national under-17 football team of Wales and is controlled by the Football Association of Wales. The team competes in the UEFA European Under-17 Championship held every year.

== Competitive record ==
=== FIFA Under-17 World Cup ===
- 1985–1989: Did not Enter
- 1991–2023: Did not Qualify
- 2025: To be determined

=== UEFA Under-16 Championships ===
- 1982–1989 did not enter
- 1990–2001 did not qualify

=== UEFA Under-17 Championships ===
- 2002 Qualifying Round
- 2003 Elite Round
- 2004 Elite Round
- 2005 Qualifying Round
- 2006 Elite Round
- 2007 Elite Round
- 2008 Elite Round
- 2009 Elite Round
- 2010 Elite Round
- 2011 Qualifying Round
- 2012 Elite Round
- 2013 Qualifying Round
- 2014 Elite Round
- 2015 Elite Round
- 2016 Elite Round
- 2017 Qualifying Round
- 2018 Qualifying Round
- 2019 Qualifying Round
- 2020–2021 Cancelled due to the COVID-19 pandemic
- 2022 Elite Round
- 2023: Group Stage
- 2024: Group Stage

== Players ==
=== Current squad ===
Players born on or after 1 January 2010 are eligible.

The following players were called up for the friendly matches against Switzerland, Sweden and Northern Ireland on 23, 25 and 28 September 2026; respectively in Valencia, Spain.

Caps and goals correct as of 28 September 2026, after the match against Northern Ireland.

No.	Pos.	Player	Date of birth (age)	Caps	Goals	Club
1	GK	Oscar Hatton		1	0	(The Football Association) Stoke City
12	GK	Trystan Hounsell	25 January 2010 (age 16)	2	0	(The Football Association) Middlesbrough
2	DF	Tom Alcock	6 January 2010 (age 16)	3	0	(The Football Association) Stoke City
3	DF	Leo Kelleher	8 April 2010 (age 16)	1	0	(The Football Association) Bristol Rovers
4	DF	Fabian Williams	20 January 2010 (age 16)	3	0	(The Football Association) Aston Villa
5	DF	Ted Evans	21 May 2010 (age 16)	3	0	(The Football Association) Tottenham Hotspur
14	DF	Hugo Daniel	1 October 2010 (age 16)	5	0	(Football Association of Wales) Cardiff City
15	DF	Joe Deighton	5 November 2010 (age 16)	2	0	(The Football Association) Manchester United
16	DF	Sebastian Sedgemore	15 October 2010 (age 16)	1	0	(The Football Association) West Bromwich Albion
	DF	Leon Huxley	23 August 2010 (age 16)	0	0	(The Football Association) Wolverhampton Wanderers
6	MF	Archie Walls	15 January 2010 (age 16)	6	0	(The Football Association) Blackburn Rovers
8	MF	Gruffydd Evans	21 May 2010 (age 16)	2	0	(Football Association of Wales) Cardiff City
10	MF	Dan Goulding	12 October 2010 (age 16)	4	0	(The Football Association) Reading
17	MF	Noah Yabantu		3	0	(Football Association of Wales) Cardiff City
18	MF	Alffi Hughes	17 May 2010 (age 16)	2	0	(Football Association of Wales) Swansea City
22	MF	Cynan Holdsworth	12 October 2010 (age 16)	3	0	(Football Association of Wales) Wrexham
7	FW	Dembo Jaiteh	31 December 2010 (age 15)	3	0	(Football Association of Wales) Cardiff City
9	FW	Lucas Roberts	13 October 2010 (age 16)	3	1	(The Football Association) Wigan Athletic
11	FW	George Thomas	21 October 2010 (age 16)	3	1	(The Football Association) Aston Villa
19	FW	Freddie Carlsen-Browne	18 October 2010 (age 16)	3	0	(The Football Association) Exeter City
20	FW	Ifan Harding	24 April 2011 (age 15)	3	0	(Football Association of Wales) Swansea City
	FW	Bobby Lewis	27 February 2010 (age 16)	4	2	(Football Association of Wales) Swansea City

=== Recent call-ups ===
The following players have also been called up to the squad within the last twelve months, and remain eligible for selection.

Pos.	Player	Date of birth (age)	Caps	Goals	Club	Latest call-up
MF	Ralphie Beckwith	18 August 2010 (age 16)	3	0	(England) Millwall	v. Georgia, 16 April 2026
MF	Paul Moreno	11 January 2010 (age 16)	3	3	(Wales) Cardiff City	v. Liechtenstein, 18 November 2025
FW	Axel Donczew	15 February 2010 (age 16)	3	2	(Wales) Cardiff City	v. Liechtenstein, 18 November 2025

== See also ==
- UEFA European Under-17 Championship
- Football Association of Wales
- Wales national football team
- Wales national under-21 football team
- Wales national under-20 football team
- Wales national under-19 football team
- Wales national under-18 football team
