= Malta national under-17 football team =

National youth association football team

Malta
- Nickname(s): Knights of Malta; Ħomor (Reds); Falcons
- Association: Malta Football Association
- Confederation: UEFA (Europe)
- Head coach: (Malta) Ivan Woods
- Home stadium: Ta' Qali National Stadium
- FIFA code: MLT
First colours	Second colours

First international
- Malta 1–6 Switzerland (Valletta, Malta; March 4, 1981)

Biggest win
- Malta 2–0 Estonia (Prague, Czech Republic; October 20, 1994)

Biggest defeat
- Czechoslovakia 9–0 Malta (Slaný, Czechoslovakia; October 25, 1989)

FIFA U-17 World Cup
- Appearances: 0

UEFA European Under-17 Championship
- Appearances: 1 (first in 2014)
- Best result: Group Stage (2014)

The Malta national under-17 football team represents Malta in international football competitions such as the FIFA U-17 World Cup, the UEFA European Under-17 Championship, as well as any other under-17 international football tournaments. It is governed by the Malta Football Association. In October 2009, Malta qualified from its group to the Elite Round that was played in March 2010. This success came following a 2-1 victory over the Netherlands and a 0-0 draw with group host nation Andorra, after having lost the first match against Northern Ireland 2-0. Malta qualified as the best third-placed team.

== UEFA European Under-17 Championship record ==
- (Denmark) 2002: Did not qualify
- (Portugal) 2003: Did not qualify
- (France) 2004: Did not qualify
- (Italy) 2005: Did not qualify
- (Luxembourg) 2006: Did not qualify
- (Belgium) 2007: Did not qualify
- (Turkey) 2008: Did not qualify
- (Germany) 2009: Did not qualify
- (Liechtenstein) 2010: Did not qualify - Elite Round
- (Serbia) 2011: Did not qualify
- (Slovenia) 2012: Did not qualify
- (Slovakia) 2013: Did not qualify
- (Malta) 2014: Group Stage - (hosts)
- (Bulgaria) 2015: Did not qualify
- (Azerbaijan) 2016: Did not qualify
- (Croatia) 2017: Did not qualify
- (England) 2018: Did not qualify
- (Republic of Ireland) 2019: Did not qualify
- (Estonia) 2020: Cancelled
- (Cyprus) 2021: Cancelled
- (Israel) 2022: Did not qualify
- (Hungary) 2023: Did not qualify

== Current squad ==
The following players were called up for the most recent fixtures in 2026 UEFA European Under-17 Championship qualification.

No.	Pos.	Player	Date of birth (age)	Club
1	GK	Vincent Tabone	22 January 2009 (age 17)	(Swiss Football Association) Lausanne
12	GK	Jayden Spiteri	23 October 2009 (age 17)	(Malta Football Association) Valletta
2	DF	Julian Scicluna	24 February 2009 (age 17)	(Malta Football Association) Pietà Hotspurs
4	DF	Lydon Attard	21 May 2009 (age 17)	(Malta Football Association) Mosta
13	DF	Denzil Sultana	14 February 2009 (age 17)	(Malta Football Association) Valletta
5	MF	Densel Grech	12 June 2009 (age 17)	(Malta Football Association) Pietà Hotspurs
6	MF	Ryan Debono (captain)	7 July 2009 (age 17)	(Malta Football Association) Mosta
7	MF	Jayden Roe	6 March 2010 (age 16)	(Malta Football Association) Hibernians
8	MF	Kaylon Zammit	29 October 2009 (age 17)	(Malta Football Association) Pietà Hotspurs
10	MF	Caden Tanti	23 January 2009 (age 17)	(Italian Football Federation) Genoa
14	MF	Yan Cutajar	5 January 2009 (age 17)	(Malta Football Association) Sirens
15	MF	Mattias Debono	14 June 2009 (age 17)	(Malta Football Association) Floriana
18	MF	Karim Misurati	26 March 2009 (age 17)	(Malta Football Association) Pietà Hotspurs
3	MF	Zayden Chetcuti	6 November 2009 (age 16)	(Malta Football Association) Mosta
9	FW	Denzel Attard	28 December 2009 (age 16)	(Malta Football Association) Floriana
11	FW	Luca Chetcuti	13 August 2009 (age 17)	(Malta Football Association) Mosta
16	FW	James Sharpe	29 October 2009 (age 17)	(The Football Association) Plymouth Argyle
17	FW	Francois Micallef	29 July 2009 (age 17)	(Malta Football Association) Mosta
19	FW	Jamie Nwoko	18 January 2009 (age 17)	(Malta Football Association) St. Andrews
20	FW	Justin Pena Serna	28 February 2009 (age 17)	(Malta Football Association) St. Andrews
