= Cyprus national under-17 football team =

National U-17 association football team

Cyprus U-17
- Nickname(s): Εθνική Παίδων ("National team of Kids")
- Association: Cyprus Football Association
- Head coach: Avraam Sergides
First colours	Second colours

European Championship
- Appearances: 3 (first in 1990)
- Best result: Group Stage (1990, 1992, 2024)

The Cypriot national under-17 football team is the national under-17 football team of Cyprus and is controlled by the Cyprus Football Association.

== UEFA U-16/U-17 Championship Record ==
- 1982 to 1984: Did not enter
- 1985 to 1989: Did not qualify
- 1990: Group Stage
- 1991: Did not qualify
- 1992: Group Stage
- 1993 to 2001: Did not qualify
- 2002 to 2005: Qualifying Round
- 2006: Elite Round
- 2007 to 2015: Qualifying Round
- 2016: Qualifying Round
- 2017 to 2018: Elite Round
- 2019: Qualifying Round
- 2020 and 2021: Cancelled
- 2022: Did not qualify
- 2023: Did not qualify
- 2024: Group Stage

== FIFA U-17 World Cup Record ==
- 1985 to 2019: Did not qualify
- 2021: Cancelled
- 2023: Did not qualify
- 2025: To be determined

== Current squad ==
The following players were called up for the most recent 2026 UEFA European Under-17 Championship qualification matches.

No.	Pos.	Player	Date of birth (age)	Club
	GK	Charalampos Pavlou	6 November 2009 (age 16)	(Cyprus Football Association) Karmiotissa
1	GK	Nikolas Georgiou	17 April 2009 (age 17)	(Cyprus Football Association) Aris Limassol
12	GK	Theofanis Aresti	29 April 2009 (age 17)	(Cyprus Football Association) Apollon Limassol
	DF	Savvas Savva	8 May 2009 (age 17)	(Cyprus Football Association) AEL Limassol
	DF	Martinos Charalampous	2 January 2009 (age 17)	(Cyprus Football Association) Aris Limassol
3	DF	Antonis Konis	6 March 2009 (age 17)	(Hellenic Football Federation) Panathinaikos
4	DF	Marios Toumpas	18 February 2009 (age 17)	(Cyprus Football Association) APOEL
5	DF	Andreas Dimitriou (captain)	6 June 2009 (age 17)	(Cyprus Football Association) Aris Limassol
14	DF	Christodoulos Marneros	14 November 2009 (age 16)	(Cyprus Football Association) Apollon Limassol
20	DF	Konstantinos Zampas	7 March 2009 (age 17)	(Cyprus Football Association) APOEL
	DF	Alexandros Middleton	16 March 2009 (age 17)	(Cyprus Football Association) APOEL
	DF	Giorgios Theofanous	22 June 2009 (age 17)	(Cyprus Football Association) Omonia
	DF	Andreas Eleftheriou	11 November 2009 (age 16)	(Cyprus Football Association) Ayia Napa
2	DF	Sotiris Panagi	28 February 2009 (age 17)	(Cyprus Football Association) Anorthosis Famagusta
	MF	Charalampos Konstantinou	9 February 2009 (age 17)	(Hellenic Football Federation) Atromitos
	MF	Marios Filippidis	7 May 2009 (age 17)	(Cyprus Football Association) APOEL
6	MF	Konstantinos Lythragomitis	11 September 2009 (age 17)	(Cyprus Football Association) Omonia
8	MF	Markos Theodorou	22 June 2009 (age 17)	(Cyprus Football Association) AEL Limassol
13	MF	Vasilis Vasilakkas	1 January 2009 (age 17)	(Cyprus Football Association) Nea Salamis
16	MF	Paraskevas Konstantinou	6 February 2009 (age 17)	(Cyprus Football Association) Ayia Napa
17	MF	Michalis Hadjichambi	16 February 2009 (age 17)	(Cyprus Football Association) AEK Larnaca
	MF	Sotiris Pourikkos	5 February 2009 (age 17)	(Cyprus Football Association) Aris Limassol
7	MF	Alexandros Geroukalis	13 January 2009 (age 17)	(Hellenic Football Federation) AEK Athens
10	MF	Andreas Pieri	13 January 2010 (age 16)	(Royal Spanish Football Federation) Valencia
	FW	Christos Alampritis	16 January 2009 (age 17)	(Cyprus Football Association) Anorthosis Famagusta
11	FW	David Gerasimou	2 November 2009 (age 17)	(Cyprus Football Association) AEK Larnaca
	FW	Andreas Misiellis	11 May 2009 (age 17)	(Cyprus Football Association) AEK Larnaca
18	FW	Alexandros Skender	15 May 2010 (age 16)	(Cyprus Football Association) Omonia
15	FW	Anastasis Glafkou	16 March 2010 (age 16)	(Hellenic Football Federation) Olympiacos
	FW	Stefanos Anastasiou	22 February 2009 (age 17)	(Cyprus Football Association) AEK Larnaca
9	FW	Robertos Rotis	26 January 2009 (age 17)	(Cyprus Football Association) Apollon Limassol
19	FW	Petros Makkoulas	13 August 2009 (age 17)	(Cyprus Football Association) APOEL

== See also ==
- Cyprus national football team
- Cyprus national under-21 football team
- Cyprus national under-19 football team
- UEFA European Under-17 Championship
