= Liechtenstein national under-17 football team =

Liechtenstein Under 17
- Association: Liechtenstein Football; Association
- Head coach: (Austria) Dieter Alge
First colours	Second colours

The Liechtenstein national under-17 football team is the under-17 football team of Liechtenstein. It is controlled by the Liechtenstein Football Association.

== Current squad ==
The following players were called up for the most recent fixtures in 2026 UEFA European Under-17 Championship qualification.

No.	Pos.	Player	Date of birth (age)	Club
1	GK	Janick Kaufmann	22 August 2009 (age 17)	(Liechtenstein Football Association) FC Vaduz
12	GK	Tobias Heitz	10 August 2009 (age 17)	(Liechtenstein Football Association) FC Vaduz
2	DF	Lukas Schumacher	1 June 2009 (age 17)	(Liechtenstein Football Association) FC Vaduz
4	DF	Luca Dünser	21 April 2010 (age 16)	(Liechtenstein Football Association) FC Schaan
5	DF	Gabriel Beck	22 January 2010 (age 16)	(Liechtenstein Football Association) FC Triesen
8	DF	Noah Gunsch	11 January 2009 (age 17)	(Liechtenstein Football Association) FC Vaduz
16	DF	Alexander Matheis	16 March 2010 (age 16)	(Liechtenstein Football Association) USV Eschen/Mauren
6	DF	Noe Kessler	1 June 2009 (age 17)	(Swiss Football Association) FC Küsnacht
15	DF	Manoel Honorio	23 September 2009 (age 17)	(Liechtenstein Football Association) USV Eschen/Mauren
7	DF	Arda Tuncay	3 January 2009 (age 17)	(Liechtenstein Football Association) FC Vaduz
3	MF	Daniel Loacker	8 June 2009 (age 17)	(Liechtenstein Football Association) FC Vaduz
13	MF	Levin Bolt	6 November 2010 (age 16)	(Liechtenstein Football Association) FC Vaduz
14	MF	Florian Jahiu	3 January 2010 (age 16)	(Liechtenstein Football Association) FC Balzers
17	MF	Elia Matt	6 September 2010 (age 16)	(Liechtenstein Football Association) USV Eschen/Mauren
18	MF	Leon Nobile	10 November 2010 (age 15)	(Liechtenstein Football Association) USV Eschen/Mauren
10	MF	Emanuel Wolf (captain)	17 July 2009 (age 17)	(Liechtenstein Football Association) FC Vaduz
9	FW	Erjon Memaj	3 March 2009 (age 17)	(Liechtenstein Football Association) FC Vaduz
11	FW	Tenzin Charaka	17 March 2010 (age 16)	(Liechtenstein Football Association) FC Triesen
19	FW	Janai Balbuena	15 September 2009 (age 17)	(Liechtenstein Football Association) FC Vaduz
20	FW	Raphael Lo Russo	21 September 2010 (age 16)	(Liechtenstein Football Association) USV Eschen/Mauren

== Results 2026 ==
these are the results of Liechtenstein Under-17 in 2026.

22 April UEFA European Under-17 Championship Qualifying	Hungary	4-0	Liechtenstein	Yerevan, Armenia
	Somogyi 26'; szakál 45+1'; Vasiljevic 78'; Wiesner (pen.), 4'	Report		Stadium: FFA Academy Stadium; Attendance: 50; Referee: Alex johnson Malta

25 April UEFA European Under-17 Championship Qualifying	Luxembourg	5-0	Liechtenstein	Yerevan, Armenia
	Moreira 49'; Elombo 61' (pen.); Nascimento 66' (pen.) Macedo 68' Pimenta 90'	Report		Stadium: FFA Academy Stadium; Attendance: 50; Referee: Alex JohnsonMalta

28 April UEFA European Under-17 Championship Qualifying	Liechtenstein	1-2	Armenia	Yerevan, Armenia
	Wolf 77'	Report	Yervandyan 12', 90+7' (pen.)	Stadium: Republican Stadium after Vazgen Sargsyan; Attendance: 539; Referee: Kristaps RatnieksLatvia

12 October UEFA European Under-17 Championship Qualifying	Spain	8-0	Liechtenstein	Schaan, Liechtenstein
	Garcés 17'; Joaquin Sanchez 22'; Torondol 25', 49', 64'; Asier Sánchez 50'; Aranda 52', 87'	Report		Stadium: LFV Campus; Attendance: 726; Referee: Konstantinos FellasCyprus

15 Oktober UEFA European Under-17 Championship Qualifying	Switzerland	13-0	Liechtenstein	Schaan, Liechtenstein
	Cavka 12', 20', 45' (pen.); Nobile 15' (o.g.); Hare 25'; Arslan 26', 29'; Kele 38', 49'; Zanovello 51', 54', 90+2'; Dzaferi 79'	Report		Stadium: LFV Campus; Attendance: 532; Referee: Martin Zhivkov VelikovBulgaria

18 October UEFA European Under-17 Championship Qualifying	Liechtenstein	0-14	Israel	Schaan, Liechtenstein
		Report	Matheis 14' (o.g.); Goldenberg 22', 38', 55'; Dabah 31', 50', 90+5'; Koriat 21'; Dorra 58', 64'; Azrane 71', 76'; Kalfe = 80'; Yonatanov 89'	Stadium: LFV Campus; Attendance: 273; Referee: Kristaps Ratnieks Latvia

== See also ==
- Liechtenstein Football Association
- Liechtenstein national football team
- Football in Liechtenstein
