= Bulgaria national under-17 football team =

National U-17 association football team

Bulgaria U-17
- Nickname: The Young Lions
- Association: Bulgarian Football Union
- Confederation: UEFA (Europe)
- Head coach: Svetoslav Petrov
- Captain: Kaloyan Bozhkov
- FIFA code: BUL
First colours	Second colours

FIFA U-17 World Cup
- Appearances: 0

European Championship
- Appearances: 7 (first in 1985)
- Best result: Group stage: 7 times

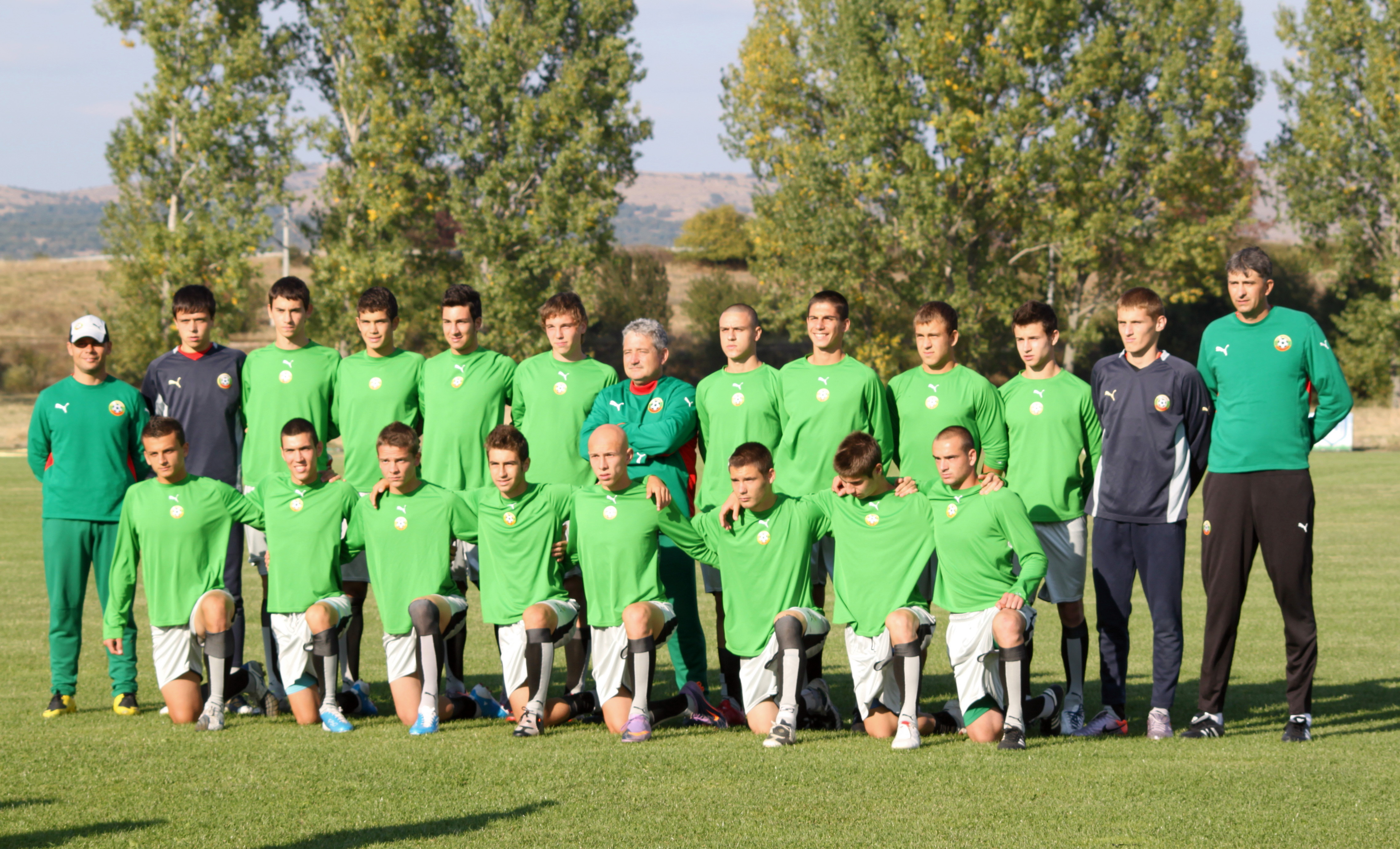
The Bulgaria national under-17 football team in 2010

The Bulgaria national under-17 football team represents Bulgaria in football at an under-17 age level and is controlled by the Bulgarian Football Union, the governing body for football in Bulgaria.

== Competition results ==
Champions Runners-up Third place/Semi-finals Fourth place Other Top Results

=== Balkan U-17 Championship ===
Year	Rank
(Bulgaria) 1973	Champions

=== UEFA European U-16/U-17 Championship ===
Year	Rank
(Italy) 1982	Did not qualify
(West Germany) 1984	Quarter-finals-Did not qualify
(Hungary) 1985	Group stage
(Greece) 1986	Group stage
(France) 1987	Group stage
(Spain) 1988	Did not qualify
(Denmark) 1989	Group stage
(East Germany) 1990	Did not qualify
(Switzerland) 1991	Group stage
(Cyprus) 1992	Did not qualify
(Turkey) 1993	Did not qualify
(Republic of Ireland) 1994	Did not qualify
(Belgium) 1995	Did not qualify
(Austria) 1996	Did not qualify
(Germany) 1997	Did not qualify
(Scotland) 1998	Did not qualify
(Czech Republic) 1999	Did not qualify
(Israel) 2000	Did not qualify
(England) 2001	Did not qualify
(Denmark) 2002	Did not qualify
(Portugal) 2003	Elite Round-Did not qualify
(France) 2004	Did not qualify
(Italy) 2005	Elite Round-Did not qualify
(Luxembourg) 2006	Elite Round-Did not qualify
(Belgium) 2007	Did not qualify
(Turkey) 2008	Did not qualify
(Germany) 2009	Did not qualify
(Liechtenstein) 2010	Did not qualify
(Serbia) 2011	Did not qualify
(Slovenia) 2012	Elite Round-Did not qualify
(Slovakia) 2013	Elite Round-Did not qualify
(Malta) 2014	Did not qualify
(Bulgaria) 2015	Group stage
(Azerbaijan) 2016	Elite Round-Did not qualify
(Croatia) 2017	Did not qualify
(England) 2018	Did not qualify
(Republic of Ireland) 2019	Did not qualify
(Estonia) ~~2020~~	Cancelled due to COVID-19 pandemic
(Cyprus) ~~2021~~	Cancelled due to COVID-19 pandemic
(Israel) 2022	Group stage
(Hungary) 2023	Did not qualify
(Cyprus) 2024	Elite Round-Did not qualify
(Albania) 2025	to be determined

=== FIFA U-17 World Cup ===
Year	Rank
(China) 1985 to (Indonesia) 2023	Did not qualify
(Qatar) 2025	To be determined

== Players ==
=== Current squad ===
The following players were called up for the most recent 2026 UEFA European Under-17 Championship qualification matches.

No.	Pos.	Player	Date of birth (age)	Club
1	GK	Aleksandar Panayotov	28 February 2009 (age 17)	(Bulgarian Football Union) Ludogorets Razgrad
12	GK	Alek Zdravkov	29 April 2010 (age 16)	(Bulgarian Football Union) Levski Sofia
2	DF	Aleksandar Tsenov	30 January 2009 (age 17)	(Bulgarian Football Union) Levski Sofia
4	DF	Martin Penchev	16 November 2009 (age 16)	(Bulgarian Football Union) Cherno More
5	DF	Timur Mustafa	8 January 2009 (age 17)	(Bulgarian Football Union) Ludogorets Razgrad
13	DF	Dimitar Kanev	16 July 2009 (age 17)	(Bulgarian Football Union) Septemvri Sofia
3	DF	Viktor Beykov	5 May 2009 (age 17)	(German Football Association) Hoffenheim
16	DF	Maksimilian Lazarov	15 January 2009 (age 17)	(Bulgarian Football Union) Slavia Sofia
17	MF	Yastiyan Georgiev	25 February 2009 (age 17)	(Bulgarian Football Union) Ludogorets Razgrad
6	MF	Aleksandar Vutov	29 August 2009 (age 17)	(Bulgarian Football Union) Septemvri Sofia
7	MF	Ernan Angelov	20 January 2009 (age 17)	(Bulgarian Football Union) Levski Sofia
8	MF	Viktor Dobrev	28 April 2009 (age 17)	(Bulgarian Football Union) Septemvri Sofia
20	MF	Ivan Filipov	25 July 2009 (age 17)	(Bulgarian Football Union) Botev Plovdiv
10	MF	Nikolay Popov	11 July 2009 (age 17)	(Italian Football Federation) Udinese
18	MF	Kaloyan Deyanski	27 September 2009 (age 17)	(Bulgarian Football Union) Levski Sofia
21	FW	Aleksandar Marinov	7 July 2009 (age 17)	(Bulgarian Football Union) Septemvri Sofia
15	FW	Petar Bayrakov	9 October 2009 (age 17)	(Bulgarian Football Union) Botev Plovdiv
9	FW	Andrey Grozdanov	26 February 2009 (age 17)	(Bulgarian Football Union) Septemvri Sofia
11	FW	Preslav Stoykov	22 February 2009 (age 17)	(Bulgarian Football Union) Ludogorets Razgrad
14	FW	Lazar Petrov	1 February 2009 (age 17)	(Bulgarian Football Union) Levski Sofia

== See also ==
- Bulgaria national under-18 football team
- Bulgaria national under-19 football team
- Bulgaria national under-21 football team
- Bulgaria national football team
