= 2015 UEFA European Under-17 Championship qualification =

Tournament details
- Dates: 19 September – 31 October 2014 (qualifying round); 12–26 March 2015 (elite round)
- Teams: 53 (from 1 confederation)

Tournament statistics
- Matches played: 126
- Goals scored: 316 (2.51 per match)
- Top scorer: (Slovenia) Jan Mlakar (8 goals)

The 2015 UEFA European Under-17 Championship qualifying competition was a men's under-17 football competition played in 2014 and 2015 to determine the 15 teams joining Bulgaria, who qualified automatically as hosts, in the 2015 UEFA European Under-17 Championship final tournament. A total of 53 UEFA member national teams entered the qualifying competition.

Each match lasted 80 minutes, consisting of two halves of 40 minutes, with an interval of 15 minutes.

The final tournament also acted as the UEFA qualifier for the 2015 FIFA U-17 World Cup in Chile, with six teams qualifying (the four semi-finalists and the two winners of play-off matches between the losing quarter-finalists).

== Format ==
The qualifying competition consisted of two rounds:

- Qualifying round: Apart from Germany, which received a bye to the elite round as the team with the highest seeding coefficient, the remaining 52 teams were drawn into 13 groups of four teams. Each group was played in single round-robin format at one of the teams selected as hosts after the draw. The 13 group winners, the 13 runners-up, and the five third-placed teams with the best record against the first and second-placed teams in their group advanced to the elite round.
- Elite round: The 32 teams were drawn into eight groups of four teams. Each group was played in single round-robin format at one of the teams selected as hosts after the draw. The eight group winners and the seven runners-up with the best record against the first and third-placed teams in their group qualified for the final tournament.

=== Tiebreakers ===
If two or more teams were equal on points on completion of a mini-tournament, the following tie-breaking criteria were applied, in the order given, to determine the rankings:

1. Higher number of points obtained in the mini-tournament matches played among the teams in question;
2. Superior goal difference resulting from the mini-tournament matches played among the teams in question;
3. Higher number of goals scored in the mini-tournament matches played among the teams in question;
4. If, after having applied criteria 1 to 3, teams still had an equal ranking, criteria 1 to 3 were reapplied exclusively to the mini-tournament matches between the teams in question to determine their final rankings. If this procedure did not lead to a decision, criteria 5 to 9 applied;
5. Superior goal difference in all mini-tournament matches;
6. Higher number of goals scored in all mini-tournament matches;
7. If only two teams had the same number of points, and they were tied according to criteria 1 to 6 after having met in the last round of the mini-tournament, their rankings were determined by a penalty shoot-out (not used if more than two teams had the same number of points, or if their rankings were not relevant for qualification for the next stage).
8. Lower disciplinary points total based only on yellow and red cards received in the mini-tournament matches (red card = 3 points, yellow card = 1 point, expulsion for two yellow cards in one match = 3 points);
9. Drawing of lots.

To determine the five best third-placed teams from the qualifying round and the seven best runners-up from the elite round, the results against the teams in fourth place were discarded. The following criteria were applied:

1. Higher number of points;
2. Superior goal difference;
3. Higher number of goals scored;
4. Lower disciplinary points total based only on yellow and red cards received (red card = 3 points, yellow card = 1 point, expulsion for two yellow cards in one match = 3 points);
5. Drawing of lots.

== Qualifying round ==
=== Draw ===
The draw for the qualifying round was held at UEFA headquarters in Nyon, Switzerland on 28 November 2013 at 09:30 CET (UTC+1).

The teams were seeded according to their coefficient ranking, calculated based on the following:

- 2011 UEFA European Under-17 Championship final tournament and qualifying competition (qualifying round and elite round)
- 2012 UEFA European Under-17 Championship final tournament and qualifying competition (qualifying round and elite round)
- 2013 UEFA European Under-17 Championship final tournament and qualifying competition (qualifying round and elite round)

Each group contained two teams from Pot A and two teams from Pot B.

For political reasons, if Azerbaijan and Armenia (due to the disputed status of Nagorno-Karabakh), as well as Georgia and Russia (due to the disputed status of South Ossetia), were drawn in the same group, neither would host the mini-tournament. Moreover, Spain and Gibraltar could not be drawn in the same group due to the disputed status of Gibraltar.

Bye to elite round
Team	Coeff	Rank
Germany	11.333	1

Pot A
Team	Coeff	Rank
Netherlands	9.500	2
England	9.333	3
France	9.000	4
Hungary	8.500	5
Italy	8.000	6
Denmark	8.000	7
Russia	7.833	8
Czech Republic	7.833	9
Spain	7.833	10
Serbia	7.667	11
Portugal	7.167	12
Georgia	7.000	13
Croatia	6.833	14
Norway	6.833	15
Switzerland	6.667	16
Belgium	6.333	17
Poland	6.333	18
Ukraine	6.167	19
Sweden	6.167	20
Scotland	6.000	21
Republic of Ireland	5.833	22
Iceland	5.833	23
Belarus	5.633	24
Austria	5.500	25
Slovakia	5.000	26
Turkey	4.500	27

Pot B
Team	Coeff	Rank
Greece	4.333	28
Romania	4.333	29
Northern Ireland	4.167	30
Israel	4.000	31
Finland	3.467	32
Albania	3.000	33
Bosnia and Herzegovina	3.000	34
Slovenia	2.667	35
Lithuania	2.333	36
Luxembourg	2.333	37
Kazakhstan	2.333	38
Montenegro	2.333	39
Latvia	2.167	40
Estonia	1.833	41
Macedonia	1.667	42
Azerbaijan	1.333	43
Armenia	1.333	44
Wales	1.000	45
Moldova	1.000	46
Cyprus	1.000	47
Faroe Islands	1.000	48
Andorra	0.667	49
San Marino	0.333	50
Malta	0.333	51
Liechtenstein	0.000	52
Gibraltar	0.000	53

Notes

- Bulgaria (Coeff: 4.000) qualified automatically for the final tournament as hosts.

=== Groups ===
Times up to 25 October 2014 were CEST (UTC+2), thereafter times were CET (UTC+1).

==== Group 1 ====
Pos	Team	Pld	W	D	L	GF	GA	GD	Pts	Qualification
1	Scotland	3	2	1	0	8	0	+8	7	Elite round
2	Republic of Ireland (H)	3	2	1	0	9	2	+7	7	Elite round
3	Faroe Islands	3	0	1	2	2	8	−6	1	
4	Gibraltar	3	0	1	2	0	9	−9	1	

Source: UEFA
Rules for classification: Qualification tiebreakers
(H) Hosts
22 September 2014
16:00

Scotland	4–0	Faroe Islands
Ros. McCrorie 41'; Hendry 48'; Ross 64'; St Clair 66'	Report

Terryland Park, Galway
Referee: Edin Jakupović (Bosnia and Herzegovina)
22 September 2014
20:30

Republic of Ireland	5–0	Gibraltar
Elbouzedi 29'; Clarke 36', 63'; Davis 54'; McCourt 79'	Report

Athlone Town Stadium, Athlone
Referee: Erik Lambrechts (Belgium)

24 September 2014
16:00

Scotland	4–0	Gibraltar
Hendry 34'; Serra 46' (o.g.); Miller 58'; Allan 63'	Report

Flancare Park, Longford
Referee: Sven Bindels (Luxembourg)
24 September 2014
20:30

Faroe Islands	2–4	Republic of Ireland
Treacy 49' (o.g.); Muller 70'	Report	O'Keeffe 7'; Barrett 35'; Kinsella 69'; Clarke 80+2'

Terryland Park, Galway
Referee: Erik Lambrechts (Belgium)

27 September 2014
20:30

Republic of Ireland	0–0	Scotland
	Report

Flancare Park, Longford
Referee: Sven Bindels (Luxembourg)
27 September 2014
20:30

Gibraltar	0–0	Faroe Islands
	Report

Athlone Town Stadium, Athlone
Referee: Edin Jakupović (Bosnia and Herzegovina)

==== Group 2 ====
Pos	Team	Pld	W	D	L	GF	GA	GD	Pts	Qualification
1	Poland	3	3	0	0	9	0	+9	9	Elite round
2	Georgia (H)	3	2	0	1	5	2	+3	6	Elite round
3	Estonia	3	1	0	2	3	6	−3	3	
4	Liechtenstein	3	0	0	3	0	9	−9	0	

Source: UEFA
Rules for classification: Qualification tiebreakers
(H) Hosts
26 October 2014
10:00

Poland	4–0	Estonia
Wojtkowski 7', 12' (pen.); Adamczyk 80', 80+3'	Report

Mikheil Meskhi 2, Tbilisi
Referee: Mihaly Fabian (Hungary)
26 October 2014
13:00

Georgia	3–0	Liechtenstein
Arabidze 28' (pen.); Lezhava 51'; Kokhreidze 72'	Report

Mikheil Meskhi Stadium, Tbilisi
Referee: Sebastian Colţescu (Romania)

28 October 2014
10:00

Poland	4–0	Liechtenstein
Seemann 26' (o.g.); Bielik 43'; Jóźwiak 60'; Wojtkowski 80+2' (pen.)	Report

Mikheil Meskhi 2, Tbilisi
Referee: Tvetan Krastev (Bulgaria)
28 October 2014
12:00

Estonia	1–2	Georgia
Käit 31'	Report	Arabidze 53'; Ninua 79'

Mikheil Meskhi Stadium, Tbilisi
Referee: Mihaly Fabian (Hungary)

31 October 2014
12:00

Georgia	0–1	Poland
	Report	Prusaczyk 19'

Mikheil Meskhi Stadium, Tbilisi
Referee: Tvetan Krastev (Bulgaria)
31 October 2014
12:00

Liechtenstein	0–2	Estonia
	Report	Käit 54', 62'

Mikheil Meskhi 2, Tbilisi
Referee: Sebastian Colţescu (Romania)

==== Group 3 ====
Pos	Team	Pld	W	D	L	GF	GA	GD	Pts	Qualification
1	Italy	3	2	1	0	7	1	+6	7	Elite round
2	Iceland	3	1	2	0	3	1	+2	5	Elite round
3	Moldova (H)	3	1	1	1	4	3	+1	4	
4	Armenia	3	0	0	3	0	9	−9	0	

Source: UEFA
Rules for classification: Qualification tiebreakers
(H) Hosts
15 October 2014
14:00

Iceland	0–0	Moldova
	Report

Stadionul CPSN, Vadul lui Vodă
Referee: Danilo Grujić (Serbia)
15 October 2014
14:00

Italy	3–0	Armenia
Cutrone 34', 65'; Scamacca 76'	Report

Zimbru 2, Chișinău
Referee: Tomasz Musiał (Poland)

17 October 2014
14:00

Iceland	2–0	Armenia
M. Hilmarsson 13'; Agnarsson 36'	Report

CSR Orhei, Orhei
Referee: Laurent Kopriwa (Luxembourg)
17 October 2014
14:00

Moldova	0–3	Italy
	Report	Llamas 31' (pen.); Cutrone 51' (pen.), 67'

Stadionul CPSN, Vadul lui Vodă
Referee: Tomasz Musiał (Poland)

20 October 2014
14:00

Italy	1–1	Iceland
Cutrone 76'	Report	M. Hilmarsson 41'

Zimbru 2, Chișinău
Referee: Danilo Grujić (Serbia)
20 October 2014
14:00

Armenia	0–4	Moldova
	Report	Marandici 74', 78'; Voropai 76'; Cojocaru 80'

Stadionul CPSN, Vadul lui Vodă
Referee: Laurent Kopriwa (Luxembourg)

==== Group 4 ====
Pos	Team	Pld	W	D	L	GF	GA	GD	Pts	Qualification
1	England	3	3	0	0	8	2	+6	9	Elite round
2	France	3	2	0	1	8	3	+5	6	Elite round
3	Cyprus (H)	3	1	0	2	3	9	−6	3	
4	Macedonia	3	0	0	3	1	6	−5	0	

Source: UEFA
Rules for classification: Qualification tiebreakers
(H) Hosts
25 October 2014
14:00

England	4–1	Cyprus
Ndukwu 13', 45', 58'; Edwards 61'	Report	Papakonstantinou 80' (pen.)

Kouklia Community Stadium, Paphos
Referee: Clayton Pisani (Malta)
25 October 2014
14:00

France	3–0	Macedonia
Cognat 62'; Pelican 75'; Édouard 80+1'	Report

Pafiako Stadium, Paphos
Referee: Alexandru Tean (Moldova)

27 October 2014
14:00

England	1–0	Macedonia
Nmecha 14'	Report

Pafiako Stadium, Paphos
Referee: Suren Baliyan (Armenia)
27 October 2014
14:00

Cyprus	0–4	France
	Report	Édouard 18' (pen.), 75'; Pelican 49'; Cognat 56'

Kouklia Community Stadium, Paphos
Referee: Alexandru Tean (Moldova)

30 October 2014
14:00

France	1–3	England
Karamoh 62'	Report	Willock 30'; Patching 39'; Dasilva 69'

Pafiako Stadium, Paphos
Referee: Clayton Pisani (Malta)
30 October 2014
14:00

Macedonia	1–2	Cyprus
Ristovski 3'	Report	Matthaiou 24'; Pileas 65'

Kouklia Community Stadium, Paphos
Referee: Suren Baliyan (Armenia)

==== Group 5 ====
Pos	Team	Pld	W	D	L	GF	GA	GD	Pts	Qualification
1	Sweden	3	1	2	0	2	1	+1	5	Elite round
2	Greece	3	1	2	0	1	0	+1	5	Elite round
3	Ukraine	3	0	3	0	0	0	0	3	Elite round
4	Latvia (H)	3	0	1	2	1	3	−2	1	

Source: UEFA
Rules for classification: Qualification tiebreakers
(H) Hosts
25 September 2014
13:00

Ukraine	0–0	Greece
	Report

Olympic Sports Center of Zemgale, Jelgava
Attendance: 31
Referee: Anar Salmanov (Azerbaijan)
25 September 2014
17:00

Sweden	2–1	Latvia
Zeidan 34'; Lidberg 72'	Report	Hvoiņickis 48'

Stadions Arkādija, Riga
Attendance: 310
Referee: Sándor Andó-Szabó (Hungary)

27 September 2014
13:00

Greece	0–0	Sweden
	Report

Olympic Sports Center of Zemgale, Jelgava
Attendance: 100
Referee: Sándor Andó-Szabó (Hungary)
27 September 2014
17:00

Ukraine	0–0	Latvia
	Report

Stadions Arkādija, Riga
Attendance: 350
Referee: Mete Kalkavan (Turkey)

30 September 2014
15:00

Sweden	0–0	Ukraine
	Report

Olympic Sports Center of Zemgale, Jelgava
Attendance: 50
Referee: Mete Kalkavan (Turkey)
30 September 2014
15:00

Latvia	0–1	Greece
	Report	Limnios 17'

Stadions Arkādija, Riga
Attendance: 173
Referee: Anar Salmanov (Azerbaijan)

==== Group 6 ====
Pos	Team	Pld	W	D	L	GF	GA	GD	Pts	Qualification
1	Portugal	3	3	0	0	5	0	+5	9	Elite round
2	Slovenia (H)	3	1	1	1	5	1	+4	4	Elite round
3	Northern Ireland	3	1	1	1	4	6	−2	4	Elite round
4	Turkey	3	0	0	3	3	10	−7	0	

Source: UEFA
Rules for classification: Qualification tiebreakers
(H) Hosts
19 September 2014
15:30

Turkey	0–5	Slovenia
	Report	Mlakar 21' (pen.), 22', 46' (pen.), 58'; Kene 80'

Kidričevo Sports Park, Kidričevo
Referee: Bojan Pandžić (Sweden)
19 September 2014
15:30

Portugal	3–0	Northern Ireland
Generoso 22', 80+2'; Gomes 47'	Report

ŠRC Bakovci Stadium, Bakovci
Referee: Jovan Kaluđerović (Montenegro)

21 September 2014
15:30

Turkey	3–4	Northern Ireland
Yeşilyurt 8', 24'; Demiral 41'	Report	McКendry 2'; McKee 4'; King 10'; Conaty 80+3'

Kidričevo Sports Park, Kidričevo
Referee: Anders Poulsen (Denmark)
21 September 2014
15:30

Slovenia	0–1	Portugal
	Report	Gomes 80'

ŠRC Bakovci Stadium, Bakovci
Referee: Jovan Kaluđerović (Montenegro)

24 September 2014
15:30

Portugal	1–0	Turkey
Lourenço 34'	Report

ŠRC Bakovci Stadium, Bakovci
Referee: Bojan Pandžić (Sweden)
24 September 2014
15:30

Northern Ireland	0–0	Slovenia
	Report

Športni park Radenci, Radenci
Referee: Anders Poulsen (Denmark)

==== Group 7 ====
Pos	Team	Pld	W	D	L	GF	GA	GD	Pts	Qualification
1	Croatia	3	2	1	0	10	2	+8	7	Elite round
2	Hungary (H)	3	2	0	1	3	2	+1	6	Elite round
3	Israel	3	1	1	1	6	1	+5	4	Elite round
4	Kazakhstan	3	0	0	3	1	15	−14	0	

Source: UEFA
Rules for classification: Qualification tiebreakers
(H) Hosts
21 October 2014
13:30

Croatia	8–1	Kazakhstan
Moro 5'; Lovren 11', 32'; Brekalo 16', 50'; Sosa 27'; Crnički 62', 80+2'	Report	Soltanov 75'

Grosics Gyula Stadion, Tatabánya
Referee: Jari Järvinen (Finland)
21 October 2014
13:30

Hungary	1–0	Israel
At. Szalai 26' (pen.)	Report

Globall Football Park, Telki
Referee: Davide Massa (Italy)

23 October 2014
13:30

Croatia	0–0	Israel
	Report

Grosics Gyula Stadion, Tatabánya
Referee: Gunnar Jarl Jónsson (Iceland)
23 October 2014
13:30

Kazakhstan	0–1	Hungary
	Report	Podymskiy 56' (o.g.)

Globall Football Park, Telki
Referee: Jari Järvinen (Finland)

26 October 2014
13:30

Hungary	1–2	Croatia
Szabó 36'	Report	Lovren 21'; Pasariček 68'

Globall Football Park, Telki
Referee: Davide Massa (Italy)
26 October 2014
13:30

Israel	6–0	Kazakhstan
Ronen 9', 33'; Kazimov 18' (o.g.); Cohen 26'; Kataby 64'; Mahamid 70'	Report

Grosics Gyula Stadion, Tatabánya
Referee: Gunnar Jarl Jónsson (Iceland)

==== Group 8 ====
Pos	Team	Pld	W	D	L	GF	GA	GD	Pts	Qualification
1	Netherlands	3	3	0	0	4	0	+4	9	Elite round
2	Serbia (H)	3	2	0	1	2	1	+1	6	Elite round
3	Finland	3	1	0	2	2	4	−2	3	
4	Malta	3	0	0	3	1	4	−3	0	

Source: UEFA
Rules for classification: Qualification tiebreakers
(H) Hosts
17 October 2014
14:00

Serbia	1–0	Malta
Nišić 71'	Report

Sports Center of FA of Serbia, Stara Pazova
Referee: Padraig Sutton (Republic of Ireland)
17 October 2014
14:00

Netherlands	2–0	Finland
Fernandes 71'; Dilrosun 80+3'	Report

Stadion Srem Jakovo, Jakovo
Referee: Manuel Schuettengruber (Austria)

19 October 2014
14:00

Serbia	1–0	Finland
Mehmedović 40+1'	Report

Sports Center of FA of Serbia, Stara Pazova
Referee: Svein-Erik Edvartsen (Norway)
19 October 2014
14:00

Malta	0–1	Netherlands
	Report	Janga 22'

Stadion Srem Jakovo, Jakovo
Referee: Manuel Schuettengruber (Austria)

22 October 2014
14:00

Netherlands	1–0	Serbia
Eiting 18' (pen.)	Report

Sports Center of FA of Serbia, Stara Pazova
Referee: Padraig Sutton (Republic of Ireland)
22 October 2014
14:00

Finland	2–1	Malta
Mäenpää 16'; Lingman 52' (pen.)	Report	Beerman 50'

Stadion Srem Jakovo, Jakovo
Referee: Svein-Erik Edvartsen (Norway)

==== Group 9 ====
Pos	Team	Pld	W	D	L	GF	GA	GD	Pts	Qualification
1	Austria	3	3	0	0	6	0	+6	9	Elite round
2	Norway	3	2	0	1	7	2	+5	6	Elite round
3	Albania (H)	3	1	0	2	5	6	−1	3	
4	San Marino	3	0	0	3	1	11	−10	0	

Source: UEFA
Rules for classification: Qualification tiebreakers
(H) Hosts
8 October 2014
11:00

Austria	2–0	San Marino
Lovrić 14', 34'	Report

Gjorgji Kyçyku Stadium, Pogradec
Referee: Alexandr Aliyev (Kazakhstan)
8 October 2014
14:00

Norway	3–0	Albania
Helmersen 24'; Sæter 48'; Ajer 58'	Report

Skënderbeu Stadium, Korçë
Referee: Zbynek Proske (Czech Republic)

10 October 2014
11:00

San Marino	0–4	Norway
	Report	Sæter 8'; Stensby 48'; Bredeli 50'; Fjellberg 56'

Gjorgji Kyçyku Stadium, Pogradec
Referee: Zbynek Proske (Czech Republic)
10 October 2014
14:00

Austria	2–0	Albania
Jakupovic 52'; Filip 80+1'	Report

Skënderbeu Stadium, Korçë
Referee: Oleksandr Derdo (Ukraine)

13 October 2014
14:00

Norway	0–2	Austria
	Report	Jakupovic 60'; Filip 64'

Gjorgji Kyçyku Stadium, Pogradec
Referee: Oleksandr Derdo (Ukraine)
13 October 2014
14:00

Albania	5–1	San Marino
Pepsi 24', 63'; Dhamo 54'; Zeka 71'; Berisha 74'	Report	C. Gatti 72'

Skënderbeu Stadium, Korçë
Referee: Alexandr Aliyev (Kazakhstan)

==== Group 10 ====
Pos	Team	Pld	W	D	L	GF	GA	GD	Pts	Qualification
1	Belgium (H)	3	2	0	1	7	2	+5	6	Elite round
2	Bosnia and Herzegovina	3	1	1	1	3	5	−2	4 (Note: Tie broken by penalty shoot-out, as they were playing each other in the last round of matches.)	Elite round
3	Azerbaijan	3	1	1	1	3	5	−2	4	Elite round
4	Switzerland	3	1	0	2	2	3	−1	3	

Source: UEFA
Rules for classification: Qualification tiebreakers
(H) Hosts
Notes:
23 October 2014
15:30

Switzerland	0–1	Bosnia and Herzegovina
	Report	Mustafić 80+3'

KVV Thes Sport, Tessenderlo
Referee: Rob Rogers (Republic of Ireland)
23 October 2014
19:00

Belgium	3–0	Azerbaijan
Van Vaerenbergh 11', 71'; Azzaoui 50' (pen.)	Report

Patro Eisden, Maasmechelen
Referee: Antonis Giachos (Greece)

25 October 2014
15:30

Belgium	4–1	Bosnia and Herzegovina
Verreth 17', 61'; Janssens 23'; Daneels 56'	Report	Mujagić 42'

KVV Thes Sport, Tessenderlo
Referee: Nerijus Dunauskas (Lithuania)
25 October 2014
19:00

Azerbaijan	2–1	Switzerland
Suleymanov 28'; Garayev 69'	Report	Samardzic 22'

Mijnstadion, Beringen
Referee: Antonis Giachos (Greece)

28 October 2014
19:00

Switzerland	1–0	Belgium
Guillemenot 40'	Report

Mijnstadion, Beringen
Referee: Nerijus Dunauskas (Lithuania)
28 October 2014
19:00

Bosnia and Herzegovina	1–1	Azerbaijan
Žerić 11'	Report	Ismayilov 26'
Penalties
Mustedanagić (penalty scored); Žerić (penalty missed); Stanić (penalty scored); Behram (penalty scored); Demirović (penalty scored)	4–3	Bediyev (penalty scored); Azizov (penalty scored); Hajiyev (penalty missed); Garayev (penalty scored); Amirli (penalty missed)

Patro Eisden, Maasmechelen
Referee: Rob Rogers (Republic of Ireland)

==== Group 11 ====
Pos	Team	Pld	W	D	L	GF	GA	GD	Pts	Qualification
1	Spain	3	3	0	0	8	2	+6	9	Elite round
2	Slovakia (H)	3	2	0	1	4	3	+1	6	Elite round
3	Luxembourg	3	1	0	2	3	4	−1	3	
4	Lithuania	3	0	0	3	1	7	−6	0	

Source: UEFA
Rules for classification: Qualification tiebreakers
(H) Hosts
24 October 2014
11:00

Slovakia	1–0	Luxembourg
Tupta 73'	Report

NTC Senec, Senec
Attendance: 250
Referee: Mervyn Smyth (Northern Ireland)
24 October 2014
15:00

Spain	2–1	Lithuania
Zalazar 9'; Aleñá 50'	Report	Mėgelaitis 6'

SFM Senec, Veľký Biel
Attendance: 128
Referee: Orel Greenfeld (Israel)

26 October 2014
11:00

Slovakia	2–0	Lithuania
Tupta 43', 56'	Report

NTC Senec, Senec
Attendance: 350
Referee: Sascha Amhof (Switzerland)
26 October 2014
14:00

Luxembourg	0–3	Spain
	Report	Zalazar 8', 69'; Pepelu 52'

SFM Senec, Veľký Biel
Attendance: 200
Referee: Orel Greenfeld (Israel)

29 October 2014
11:00

Spain	3–1	Slovakia
Šušolík 20' (o.g.); Villanueva 50'; Oscar 53'	Report	Tešlár 9'

NTC Senec, Senec
Attendance: 400
Referee: Sascha Amhof (Switzerland)
29 October 2014
11:00

Lithuania	0–3	Luxembourg
	Report	Avdusinovic 20'; Klein 40'; Bijelic 59'

SFM Senec, Veľký Biel
Attendance: 50
Referee: Mervyn Smyth (Northern Ireland)

==== Group 12 ====
Pos	Team	Pld	W	D	L	GF	GA	GD	Pts	Qualification
1	Czech Republic	3	3	0	0	4	1	+3	9	Elite round
2	Romania	3	2	0	1	8	3	+5	6	Elite round
3	Denmark	3	1	0	2	4	8	−4	3	
4	Andorra (H)	3	0	0	3	1	5	−4	0	

Source: UEFA
Rules for classification: Qualification tiebreakers
(H) Hosts
25 September 2014
15:00

Czech Republic	2–1	Romania
Plachý 11'; Sadílek 49'	Report	Mihalcea 27'

Estadi Comunal d'Andorra la Vella, Andorra la Vella
Referee: Christos Nicolaides (Cyprus)
25 September 2014
18:00

Denmark	3–1	Andorra
Brink 34', 58' (pen.), 62'	Report	Fernández 71'

Estadi Comunal d'Andorra la Vella, Andorra la Vella
Referee: Sergei Ivanov (Russia)

27 September 2014
15:00

Romania	6–1	Denmark
Coman 2', 10', 33'; Motreanu 54'; Gîsă 59'; Ghiță 67'	Report	Lønfeldt 44'

Estadi Comunal d'Andorra la Vella, Andorra la Vella
Referee: Sergei Ivanov (Russia)
27 September 2014
18:00

Czech Republic	1–0	Andorra
Chaluš 52'	Report

Estadi Comunal d'Andorra la Vella, Andorra la Vella
Referee: Tihomir Pejin (Croatia)

30 September 2014
16:30

Denmark	0–1	Czech Republic
	Report	Turnya 53'

Estadi Comunal d'Andorra la Vella, Andorra la Vella
Referee: Christos Nicolaides (Cyprus)
30 September 2014
16:30

Andorra	0–1	Romania
	Report	Coman 55' (pen.)

Estadi Nacional, Andorra la Vella
Referee: Tihomir Pejin (Croatia)

==== Group 13 ====
Pos	Team	Pld	W	D	L	GF	GA	GD	Pts	Qualification
1	Russia	3	2	1	0	4	1	+3	7	Elite round
2	Belarus (H)	3	2	0	1	4	3	+1	6	Elite round
3	Wales	3	1	1	1	3	3	0	4	Elite round
4	Montenegro	3	0	0	3	1	5	−4	0	

Source: UEFA
Rules for classification: Qualification tiebreakers
(H) Hosts
19 October 2014
13:00

Russia	0–0	Wales
	Report

Torpedo Stadium, Minsk
Referee: Benoît Bastien (France)
19 October 2014
14:00

Belarus	1–0	Montenegro
Bakhar 28' (pen.)	Report

City Stadium, Molodechno
Referee: Peter Kralović (Slovakia)

21 October 2014
13:00

Russia	2–0	Montenegro
Galadzhan 14'; Yegor Denisov 80+4'	Report

Torpedo Stadium, Minsk
Referee: Enea Jorgji (Albania)
21 October 2014
14:00

Wales	1–2	Belarus
Abbruzzese 58'	Report	Kuptsov 12'; Lisakovich 80' (pen.)

City Stadium, Molodechno
Referee: Peter Kralović (Slovakia)

24 October 2014
13:00

Belarus	1–2	Russia
Saramakha 5'	Report	Kirillov 15'; Tatayev 68'

City Stadium, Molodechno
Referee: Benoît Bastien (France)
24 October 2014
13:00

Montenegro	1–2	Wales
Ćosović 13'	Report	Cullen 39'; Harris 75'

Torpedo Stadium, Minsk
Referee: Enea Jorgji (Albania)

=== Ranking of third-placed teams ===
To determine the five best third-placed teams from the qualifying round which advanced to the elite round, only the results of the third-placed teams against the first and second-placed teams in their group were taken into account.

Pos	Grp	Team	Pld	W	D	L	GF	GA	GD	Pts	Qualification
1	5	Ukraine	2	0	2	0	0	0	0	2	Elite round
2	13	Wales	2	0	1	1	1	2	−1	1	Elite round
3	7	Israel	2	0	1	1	0	1	−1	1	Elite round
4	10	Azerbaijan	2	0	1	1	1	4	−3	1	Elite round
5	6	Northern Ireland	2	0	1	1	0	3	−3	1 (Note: Tie broken by disciplinary points.)	Elite round
6	3	Moldova	2	0	1	1	0	3	−3	1	
7	8	Finland	2	0	0	2	0	3	−3	0	
8	11	Luxembourg	2	0	0	2	0	4	−4	0	
9	2	Estonia	2	0	0	2	1	6	−5	0	
10	9	Albania	2	0	0	2	0	5	−5	0	
11	1	Faroe Islands	2	0	0	2	2	8	−6	0	
12	12	Denmark	2	0	0	2	1	7	−6	0	
13	4	Cyprus	2	0	0	2	1	8	−7	0	

Source: UEFA
Rules for classification: 1) points; 2) goal difference; 3) number of goals scored; 4) disciplinary points; 5) drawing of lots.

== Elite round ==
=== Draw ===
The draw for the elite round was held at UEFA headquarters in Nyon, Switzerland on 3 December 2014 at 10:40 CET (UTC+1).

The teams were seeded according to their results in the qualifying round. Germany, which received a bye to the elite round, were automatically seeded into Pot A. Each group contained one team from Pot A, one team from Pot B, one team from Pot C, and one team from Pot D. Winners and runners-up from the same qualifying round group could not be drawn in the same group, but third-placed teams could be drawn in the same group as winners or runners-up from the same qualifying round group.

Before the draw UEFA confirmed that, for political reasons, Ukraine and Russia could not be drawn in the same group due to the Russian military intervention in Ukraine.

Pos	Grp	Team	Pld	W	D	L	GF	GA	GD	Pts	Seeding
1	—	Germany	0	0	0	0	0	0	0	0	Pot A
2	2	Poland	3	3	0	0	9	0	+9	9	Pot A
3	11	Spain	3	3	0	0	8	2	+6	9 (Note: Tie broken by disciplinary points.)	Pot A
4	4	England	3	3	0	0	8	2	+6	9	Pot A
5	9	Austria	3	3	0	0	6	0	+6	9	Pot A
6	6	Portugal	3	3	0	0	5	0	+5	9	Pot A
7	8	Netherlands	3	3	0	0	4	0	+4	9	Pot A
8	12	Czech Republic	3	3	0	0	4	1	+3	9	Pot A
9	7	Croatia	3	2	1	0	10	2	+8	7	Pot B
10	1	Scotland	3	2	1	0	8	0	+8	7	Pot B
11	1	Republic of Ireland	3	2	1	0	9	2	+7	7	Pot B
12	3	Italy	3	2	1	0	7	1	+6	7	Pot B
13	13	Russia	3	2	1	0	4	1	+3	7	Pot B
14	12	Romania	3	2	0	1	8	3	+5	6	Pot B
15	4	France	3	2	0	1	8	3	+5	6	Pot B
16	10	Belgium	3	2	0	1	7	2	+5	6	Pot B
17	9	Norway	3	2	0	1	7	2	+5	6	Pot C
18	2	Georgia	3	2	0	1	5	2	+3	6	Pot C
19	11	Slovakia	3	2	0	1	4	3	+1	6	Pot C
20	13	Belarus	3	2	0	1	4	3	+1	6	Pot C
21	7	Hungary	3	2	0	1	3	2	+1	6	Pot C
22	8	Serbia	3	2	0	1	2	1	+1	6	Pot C
23	3	Iceland	3	1	2	0	3	1	+2	5	Pot C
24	5	Sweden	3	1	2	0	2	1	+1	5	Pot C
25	5	Greece	3	1	2	0	1	0	+1	5	Pot D
26	7	Israel	3	1	1	1	6	1	+5	4	Pot D
27	6	Slovenia	3	1	1	1	5	1	+4	4	Pot D
28	13	Wales	3	1	1	1	3	3	0	4	Pot D
29	6	Northern Ireland	3	1	1	1	4	6	−2	4	Pot D
30	10	Azerbaijan	3	1	1	1	3	5	−2	4	Pot D
31	10	Bosnia and Herzegovina	3	1	1	1	3	5	−2	4	Pot D
32	5	Ukraine	3	0	3	0	0	0	0	3	Pot D

Source: UEFA
Rules for classification: 1) points; 2) goal difference; 3) number of goals scored; 4) disciplinary points; 5) coefficient used for qualifying round draw; 6) drawing of lots.

=== Groups ===
All times were CET (UTC+1).

==== Group 1 ====
Pos	Team	Pld	W	D	L	GF	GA	GD	Pts	Qualification
1	France	3	2	1	0	9	2	+7	7	Final tournament
2	Spain (H)	3	1	2	0	3	1	+2	5	Final tournament
3	Israel	3	1	1	1	2	1	+1	4	
4	Sweden	3	0	0	3	1	11	−10	0	

Source: UEFA
Rules for classification: Qualification tiebreakers
(H) Hosts
20 March 2015
12:00

France	1–0	Israel
Boutobba 46'	Report

Estadio Municipal Guillermo Amor, Benidorm
Referee: Irfan Peljto (Bosnia and Herzegovina)
20 March 2015
18:00

Spain	2–0	Sweden
Zalazar 30'; Villalba 33'	Report

Estadio Municipal Guillermo Amor, Benidorm
Referee: Charalambos Kalogeropoulos (Greece)

22 March 2015
12:00

Sweden	1–7	France
Lidberg 44'	Report	Édouard 1', 80'; Ikoné 57', 59', 75'; Janvier 63'; Pelican 66' (pen.)

Estadio Municipal Guillermo Amor, Benidorm
Referee: Charalambos Kalogeropoulos (Greece)
22 March 2015
18:00

Spain	0–0	Israel
	Report

Estadio Municipal Guillermo Amor, Benidorm
Referee: Dumitri Muntean (Moldova)

25 March 2015
18:00

France	1–1	Spain
Samba 48'	Report	Zalazar 60'

Estadio Municipal Guillermo Amor, Benidorm
Referee: Dumitri Muntean (Moldova)
25 March 2015
18:00

Israel	2–0	Sweden
Cohen 22'; Mahamid 71'	Report

Estadio El Collao, Alcoy
Referee: Irfan Peljto (Bosnia and Herzegovina)

==== Group 2 ====
Pos	Team	Pld	W	D	L	GF	GA	GD	Pts	Qualification
1	Croatia	3	3	0	0	8	0	+8	9	Final tournament
2	Portugal	3	1	1	1	3	1	+2	4	
3	Serbia	3	1	1	1	4	3	+1	4	
4	Azerbaijan (H)	3	0	0	3	0	11	−11	0	

Source: UEFA
Rules for classification: Qualification tiebreakers
(H) Hosts
17 March 2015
10:00

Portugal	0–0	Serbia
	Report

Ismat Gayibov, Baku
Referee: Andrew Dallas (Scotland)
17 March 2015
13:30

Croatia	4–0	Azerbaijan
Majić 23', 62'; Erlić 64'; Blečić 79'	Report

Bakcell Arena, Baku
Referee: Dimitrios Massias (Cyprus)

19 March 2015
10:00

Serbia	0–3	Croatia
	Report	Moro 6'; Brekalo 67'; Blečić 79'

Ismat Gayibov, Baku
Referee: Dominik Ouschan (Austria)
19 March 2015
13:30

Portugal	3–0	Azerbaijan
Gomes 12', 17'; Cassamá 36'	Report

Bakcell Arena, Baku
Referee: Dimitrios Massias (Cyprus)

22 March 2015
13:30

Croatia	1–0	Portugal
Moro 42'	Report

Baku FC Stadium, Baku
Referee: Andrew Dallas (Scotland)
22 March 2015
13:30

Azerbaijan	0–4	Serbia
	Report	Todorović 20'; Stanisavljević 28'; Mehmedović 46' (pen.); Panović 77'

Bakcell Arena, Baku
Referee: Dominik Ouschan (Austria)

==== Group 3 ====
Pos	Team	Pld	W	D	L	GF	GA	GD	Pts	Qualification
1	Belgium	3	2	1	0	8	0	+8	7	Final tournament
2	Netherlands (H)	3	1	2	0	3	1	+2	5	Final tournament
3	Georgia	3	1	0	2	4	8	−4	3	
4	Northern Ireland	3	0	1	2	3	9	−6	1	

Source: UEFA
Rules for classification: Qualification tiebreakers
(H) Hosts
12 March 2015
16:00

Belgium	4–0	Northern Ireland
Van Vaerenbergh 15', 25'; Azzaoui 44'; Daneels 74'	Report

Sportpark Walburgen, Gendt
Referee: Fábio José Costa Veríssimo (Portugal)
12 March 2015
19:00

Netherlands	2–0	Georgia
Robertha 10'; Fosu-Mensah 49'	Report

Sportpark Zuideinderpark, Schijndel
Referee: Ádám Farkas (Hungary)

14 March 2015
14:00

Georgia	0–4	Belgium
	Report	Ademoglu 17' (pen.); Van Vaerenbergh 21'; Mangala 64'; Thuys 74'

Sportpark Zuideinderpark, Schijndel
Referee: Ádám Farkas (Hungary)
14 March 2015
17:00

Netherlands	1–1	Northern Ireland
Gordon 28' (o.g.)	Report	Lavery 73'

Sportpark Walburgen, Gendt
Referee: Milan Ilić (Serbia)

17 March 2015
19:00

Belgium	0–0	Netherlands
	Report

Sportpark Zuideinderpark, Schijndel
Referee: Fábio José Costa Veríssimo (Portugal)
17 March 2015
19:00

Northern Ireland	2–4	Georgia
Lavery 60'; King 80+3'	Report	Bugridze 6'; Arabidze 33', 48'; Gvasalia 75'

Sportpark Walburgen, Gendt
Referee: Milan Ilić (Serbia)

==== Group 4 ====
Pos	Team	Pld	W	D	L	GF	GA	GD	Pts	Qualification
1	Greece	3	1	2	0	3	2	+1	5	Final tournament
2	Republic of Ireland	3	1	1	1	5	4	+1	4	Final tournament
3	Belarus	3	1	1	1	3	3	0	4	
4	Poland (H)	3	1	0	2	1	3	−2	3	

Source: UEFA
Rules for classification: Qualification tiebreakers
(H) Hosts
21 March 2015
12:00

Republic of Ireland	2–2	Greece
Clarke 60'; Barrett 73' (pen.)	Report	Kirtzialidis 50'; Limnios 51'

Stadion Amica, Wronki
Referee: Orkhan Mammadov (Azerbaijan)
21 March 2015
17:30

Poland	0–2	Belarus
	Report	Belezyak 28', 75'

Dyskobolia Stadium, Grodzisk Wielkopolski
Referee: Srđan Jovanović (Serbia)

23 March 2015
12:00

Belarus	1–3	Republic of Ireland
Bakhar 44'	Report	Aherne 32', 77'; Barrett 42'

Stadion Amica, Wronki
Referee: Srđan Jovanović (Serbia)
23 March 2015
18:00

Poland	0–1	Greece
	Report	Tsingos 25'

Dyskobolia Stadium, Grodzisk Wielkopolski
Referee: Giorgi Kruashvili (Georgia)

26 March 2015
18:00

Republic of Ireland	0–1	Poland
	Report	Kaczmarczyk 10'

Dyskobolia Stadium, Grodzisk Wielkopolski
Referee: Orkhan Mammadov (Azerbaijan)
26 March 2015
18:00

Greece	0–0	Belarus
	Report

Stadion Amica, Wronki
Referee: Giorgi Kruashvili (Georgia)

==== Group 5 ====
Pos	Team	Pld	W	D	L	GF	GA	GD	Pts	Qualification
1	Austria	3	2	1	0	5	3	+2	7	Final tournament
2	Russia (H)	3	1	2	0	5	1	+4	5	Final tournament
3	Wales	3	1	1	1	3	3	0	4	
4	Iceland	3	0	0	3	0	6	−6	0	

Source: UEFA
Rules for classification: Qualification tiebreakers
(H) Hosts
21 March 2015
11:00

Austria	1–0	Iceland
Filip 17' (pen.)	Report

FC Krasnodar Academy Stadium, Krasnodar
Referee: Nicolas Laforge (Belgium)
21 March 2015
15:00

Russia	0–0	Wales
	Report

FC Krasnodar Academy Stadium, Krasnodar
Referee: Sandro Schärer (Switzerland)

23 March 2015
11:00

Austria	3–2	Wales
Danso 37', 40'; Ramadani 58'	Report	Harris 75'; Roberts 78'

FC Krasnodar Academy Stadium, Krasnodar
Referee: Ali Palabıyık (Turkey)
23 March 2015
15:00

Iceland	0–4	Russia
	Report	Lomovitskiy 18'; Bragin 57'; Makhatadze 74', 79'

FC Krasnodar Academy Stadium, Krasnodar
Referee: Nicolas Laforge (Belgium)

26 March 2015
15:00

Russia	1–1	Austria
Makhatadze 66' (pen.)	Report	Sahanek 75'

FC Krasnodar Academy Stadium, Krasnodar
Referee: Ali Palabıyık (Turkey)
26 March 2015
15:00

Wales	1–0	Iceland
Roberts 19'	Report

Kuban Stadium, Krasnodar
Referee: Sandro Schärer (Switzerland)

==== Group 6 ====
Pos	Team	Pld	W	D	L	GF	GA	GD	Pts	Qualification
1	England (H)	3	3	0	0	8	3	+5	9	Final tournament
2	Slovenia	3	2	0	1	5	3	+2	6	Final tournament
3	Norway	3	1	0	2	3	4	−1	3	
4	Romania	3	0	0	3	1	7	−6	0	

Source: UEFA
Rules for classification: Qualification tiebreakers
(H) Hosts
21 March 2015
16:00

England	3–1	Norway
Wright 3'; Collinge 57'; Ndukwu 62'	Report	Risa 11'

Pirelli Stadium, Burton-upon-Trent
Referee: Erez Papir (Israel)
21 March 2015
20:00

Romania	0–3	Slovenia
	Report	Mlakar 2', 40+2'; Sredojevič 5'

Liberty Way, Nuneaton
Referee: Roomer Tarajev (Estonia)

23 March 2015
16:00

Norway	2–0	Romania
Szabolcs 20' (o.g.); Grødem 40+2'	Report

Liberty Way, Nuneaton
Referee: Roomer Tarajev (Estonia)
23 March 2015
20:00

England	3–1	Slovenia
Oxford 20'; Holland 36'; Rom 38' (o.g.)	Report	Mlakar 65'

Proact Stadium, Chesterfield
Referee: Vilhjalmur Thorarinsson (Iceland)

26 March 2015
20:00

Romania	1–2	England
Petre 13'	Report	Ugbo 7', 53'

Pirelli Stadium, Burton-upon-Trent
Referee: Erez Papir (Israel)
26 March 2015
20:00

Slovenia	1–0	Norway
Mlakar 43'	Report

St George's Park National Football Centre, Burton-upon-Trent
Referee: Vilhjalmur Thorarinsson (Iceland)

==== Group 7 ====
Pos	Team	Pld	W	D	L	GF	GA	GD	Pts	Qualification
1	Czech Republic	3	2	1	0	4	2	+2	7	Final tournament
2	Scotland	3	1	1	1	2	1	+1	4	Final tournament
3	Bosnia and Herzegovina	3	1	1	1	4	5	−1	4	
4	Hungary (H)	3	0	1	2	1	3	−2	1	

Source: UEFA
Rules for classification: Qualification tiebreakers
(H) Hosts
20 March 2015
14:00

Scotland	2–0	Bosnia and Herzegovina
Morrison 49'; Harvie 70'	Report

Stadion Gyula Grosics, Tatabánya
Referee: Adrian Azzopardi (Malta)
20 March 2015
16:30

Czech Republic	1–0	Hungary
Šašinka 66'	Report

Globall Football Park, Telki
Referee: Mohammed Al-Hakim (Sweden)

22 March 2015
14:00

Czech Republic	2–2	Bosnia and Herzegovina
Šašinka 44' (pen.); Žežulka 73' (pen.)	Report	Mustedanagić 69'; Miletić 80+1'

Stadion Gyula Grosics, Tatabánya
Referee: Denis Izmailov (Kazakhstan)
22 March 2015
16:00

Hungary	0–0	Scotland
	Report

Pancho Arena, Felcsút
Referee: Adrian Azzopardi (Malta)

25 March 2015
14:00

Scotland	0–1	Czech Republic
	Report	Šašinka 13'

Stadion Gyula Grosics, Tatabánya
Referee: Mohammed Al-Hakim (Sweden)
25 March 2015
14:00

Bosnia and Herzegovina	2–1	Hungary
Demirović 37'; Mustedanagić 80+3'	Report	Dragóner 65'

Pancho Arena, Felcsút
Referee: Denis Izmailov (Kazakhstan)

==== Group 8 ====
Pos	Team	Pld	W	D	L	GF	GA	GD	Pts	Qualification
1	Germany (H)	3	2	1	0	8	2	+6	7	Final tournament
2	Italy	3	2	1	0	5	2	+3	7	Final tournament
3	Slovakia	3	1	0	2	2	6	−4	3	
4	Ukraine	3	0	0	3	1	6	−5	0	

Source: UEFA
Rules for classification: Qualification tiebreakers
(H) Hosts
21 March 2015
11:00

Germany	3–0	Slovakia
Eggestein 46', 72'; Passlack 51' (pen.)	Report

Stadion Wetzlar, Wetzlar
Referee: Alain Duriuex (Luxembourg)
21 March 2015
16:00

Italy	1–0	Ukraine
Llamas 29'	Report

Stadion Wetzlar, Wetzlar
Referee: Ola Hobber Nielsen (Norway)

23 March 2015
11:00

Germany	3–0	Ukraine
Passlack 12'; Gül 68'; Schmidt 74'	Report

Georg-Gaßmann-Stadion, Marburg
Referee: Tim Marshall (Northern Ireland)
23 March 2015
16:00

Slovakia	0–2	Italy
	Report	Cutrone 48', 76'

Georg-Gaßmann-Stadion, Marburg
Referee: Alain Duriuex (Luxembourg)

26 March 2015
11:00

Italy	2–2	Germany
Llamas 24'; Lo Faso 31'	Report	Gül 14'; Sağlam 77'

Stadion Wetzlar, Wetzlar
Referee: Ola Hobber Nielsen (Norway)
26 March 2015
11:00

Ukraine	1–2	Slovakia
Dubinchak 79'	Report	Varga 38'; Šimko 66'

Georg-Gaßmann-Stadion, Marburg
Referee: Tim Marshall (Northern Ireland)

=== Ranking of second-placed teams ===
To determine the seven best second-placed teams from the elite round which qualified for the final tournament, only the results of the second-placed teams against the first and third-placed teams in their group were taken into account.

Pos	Grp	Team	Pld	W	D	L	GF	GA	GD	Pts	Qualification
1	4	Republic of Ireland	2	1	1	0	5	3	+2	4	Final tournament
2	8	Italy	2	1	1	0	4	2	+2	4	Final tournament
3	3	Netherlands	2	1	1	0	2	0	+2	4	Final tournament
4	7	Scotland	2	1	0	1	2	1	+1	3	Final tournament
5	6	Slovenia	2	1	0	1	2	3	−1	3	Final tournament
6	5	Russia	2	0	2	0	1	1	0	2	Final tournament
7	1	Spain	2	0	2	0	1	1	0	2	Final tournament
8	2	Portugal	2	0	1	1	0	1	−1	1	

Source: UEFA
Rules for classification: 1) points; 2) goal difference; 3) number of goals scored; 4) disciplinary points; 5) drawing of lots.

== Qualified teams ==
The following 16 teams qualified for the final tournament.

Team	Qualified as	Qualified on	Previous appearances in tournament^{1} only U-17 era (since 2002)
Bulgaria	Hosts	20 March 2012	0 (debut)
France	Elite round Group 1 winners	22 March 2015	8 (2002, **2004**, 2007, 2008, 2009, 2010, 2011, 2012)
Croatia	Elite round Group 2 winners	22 March 2015	2 (2005, 2013)
Belgium	Elite round Group 3 winners	17 March 2015	3 (2006, 2007, 2012)
Greece	Elite round Group 4 winners	26 March 2015	1 (2010)
Austria	Elite round Group 5 winners	23 March 2015	3 (2003, 2004, 2013)
England	Elite round Group 6 winners	23 March 2015	9 (2002, 2003, 2004, 2005, 2007, 2009, **2010**, 2011, **2014**)
Czech Republic	Elite round Group 7 winners	25 March 2015	4 (2002, 2006, 2010, 2011)
Germany	Elite round Group 8 winners	23 March 2015	7 (2002, 2006, 2007, **2009**, 2011, 2012, 2014)
Republic of Ireland	Elite round best seven runners-up	26 March 2015	1 (2008)
Italy	Elite round best seven runners-up	23 March 2015	4 (2003, 2005, 2009, 2013)
Netherlands	Elite round best seven runners-up	22 March 2015	8 (2002, 2005, 2007, 2008, 2009, **2011**, **2012**, 2014)
Scotland	Elite round best seven runners-up	25 March 2015	2 (2008, 2014)
Slovenia	Elite round best seven runners-up	26 March 2015	1 (2012)
Russia	Elite round best seven runners-up	26 March 2015	2 (**2006**, **2013**)
Spain	Elite round best seven runners-up	25 March 2015	8 (2002, 2003, 2004, 2006, **2007**, **2008**, 2009, 2010)

^{1} Bold indicates champion for that year. Italic indicates host for that year.

== Top goalscorers ==
The following players scored four goals or more in the qualifying competition.

8 goals

- (Slovenia) Jan Mlakar

7 goals

- (Italy) Patrick Cutrone

5 goals

- (Belgium) Dennis Van Vaerenbergh
- (France) Odsonne Édouard
- (Spain) Kuki Zalazar

4 goals

- (England) Layton Ndukwu
- (Georgia (country)) Giorgi Arabidze
- (Portugal) José Gomes
- (Republic of Ireland) Trevor Clarke
- (Romania) Florinel Coman
