= Arena Sozopol =

Football stadium in Sozopol, Bulgaria

- UEFA
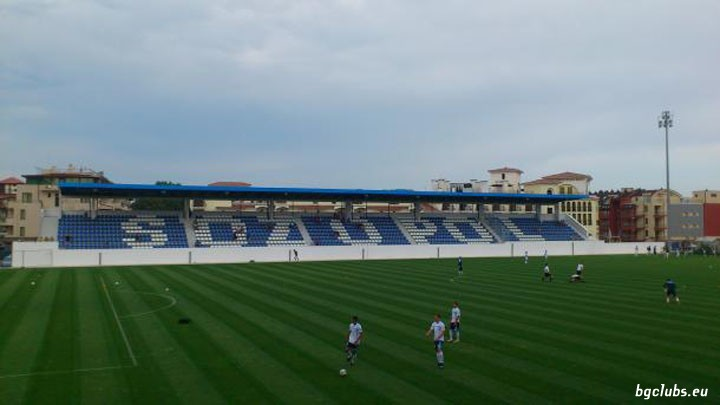
- Interactive map of Arena Sozopol
- Location: Sozopol, Bulgaria
- Coordinates: 42.4136°N 27.6969°E
- Owner: Sozopol Municipality
- Operator: FC Sozopol
- Capacity: 3,500
- Surface: Grass
- Field size: 105 × 68 metres

Construction
- Built: 2011-2012
- Opened: 2012
- Expanded: 2014

Tenants
- FC Sozopol (2014 - present); Apollonia Sozopol (2014 - present)

Arena Sozopol is a football stadium in Sozopol, Bulgaria, with a seating capacity of 3,500. It has been the home of FC Sozopol since 2012, and hosted 8 games during the 2015 UEFA European Under-17 Championship, with an average attendance of 1,395 per game (11,154 in total).

== Stands ==
=== North Stand ===
Constructed: 2012
Capacity: 2,000 (seated)

=== South Stand ===
Constructed: 2014
Capacity: 1,500 (seated)

=== Gallery ===
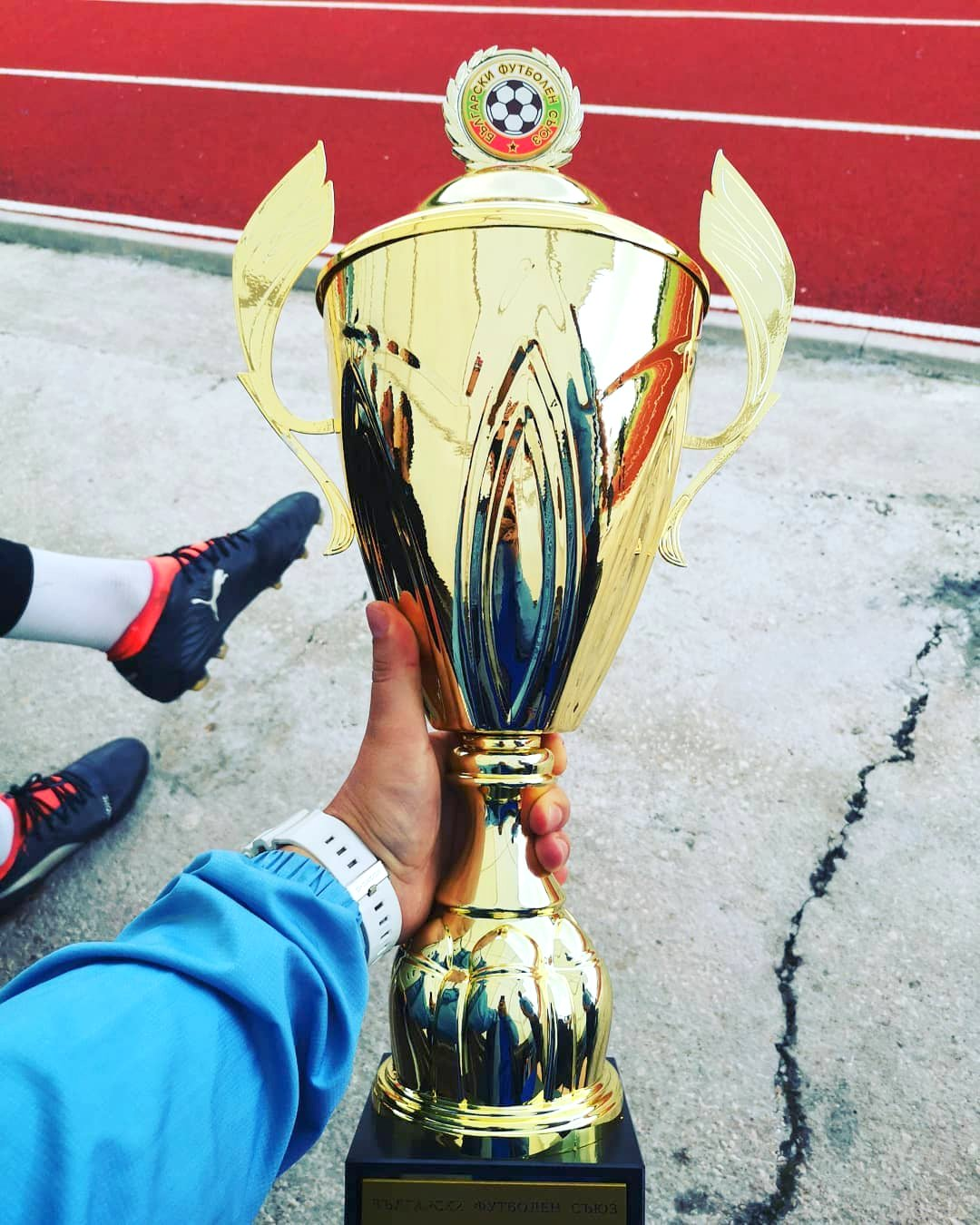

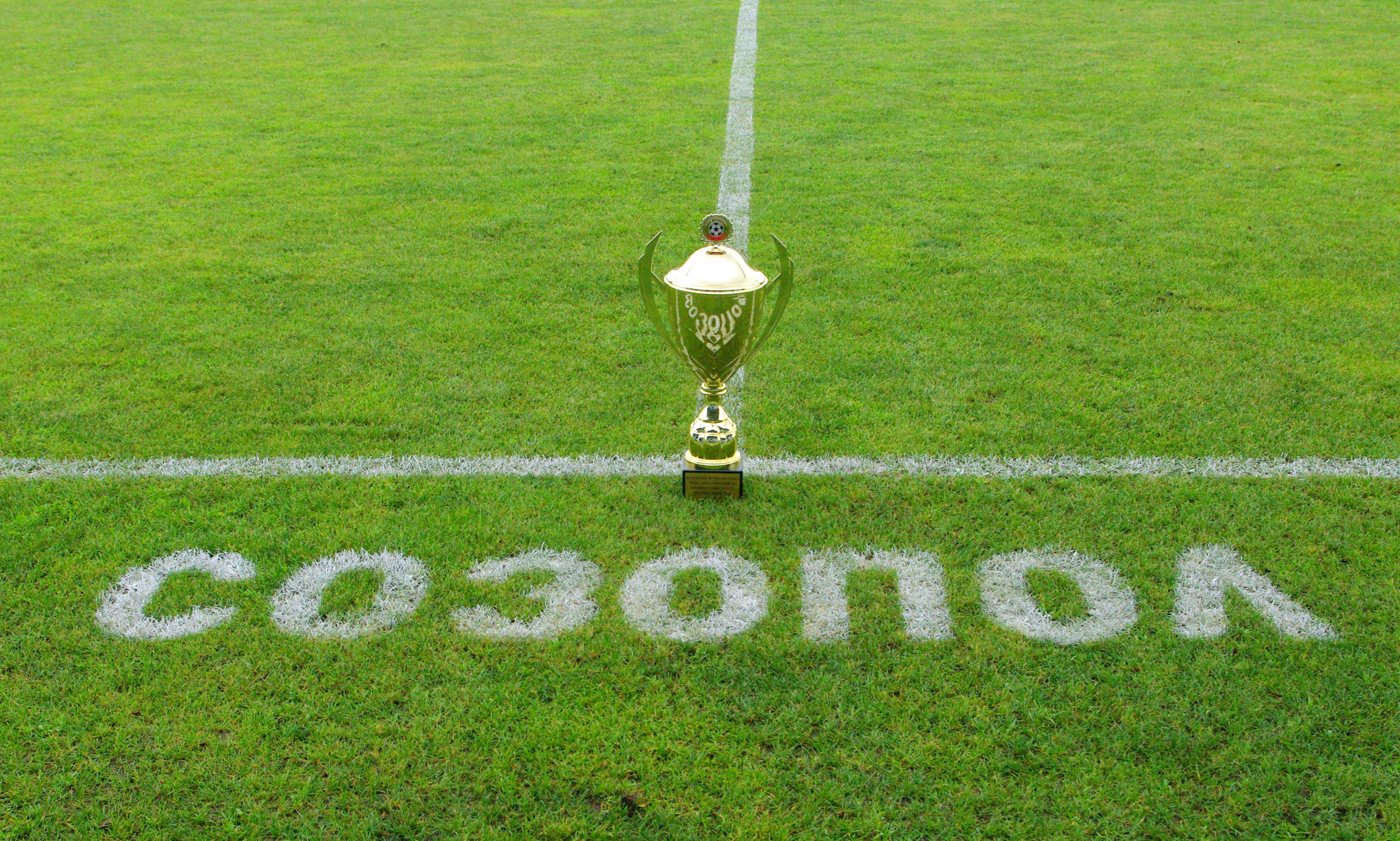

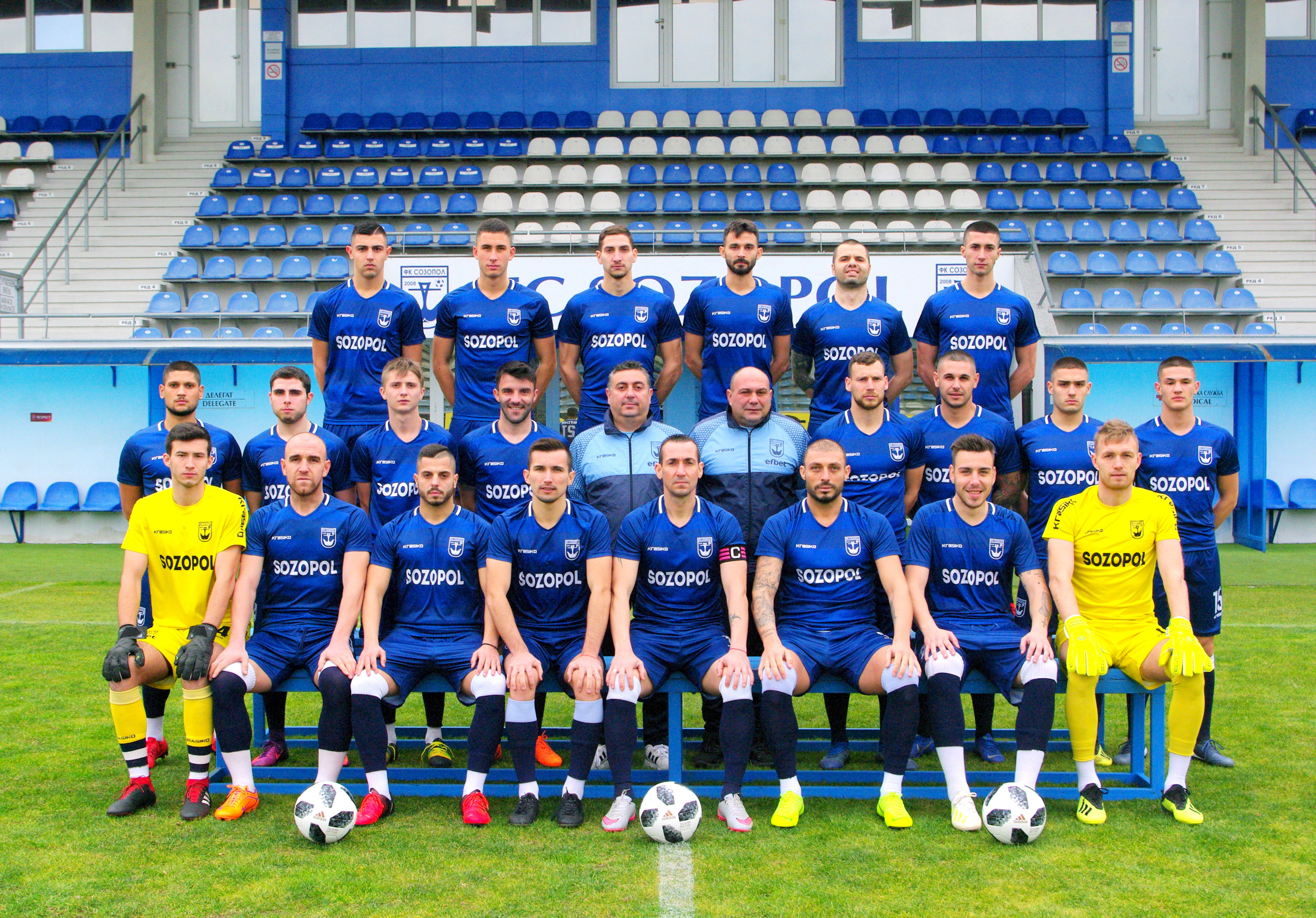

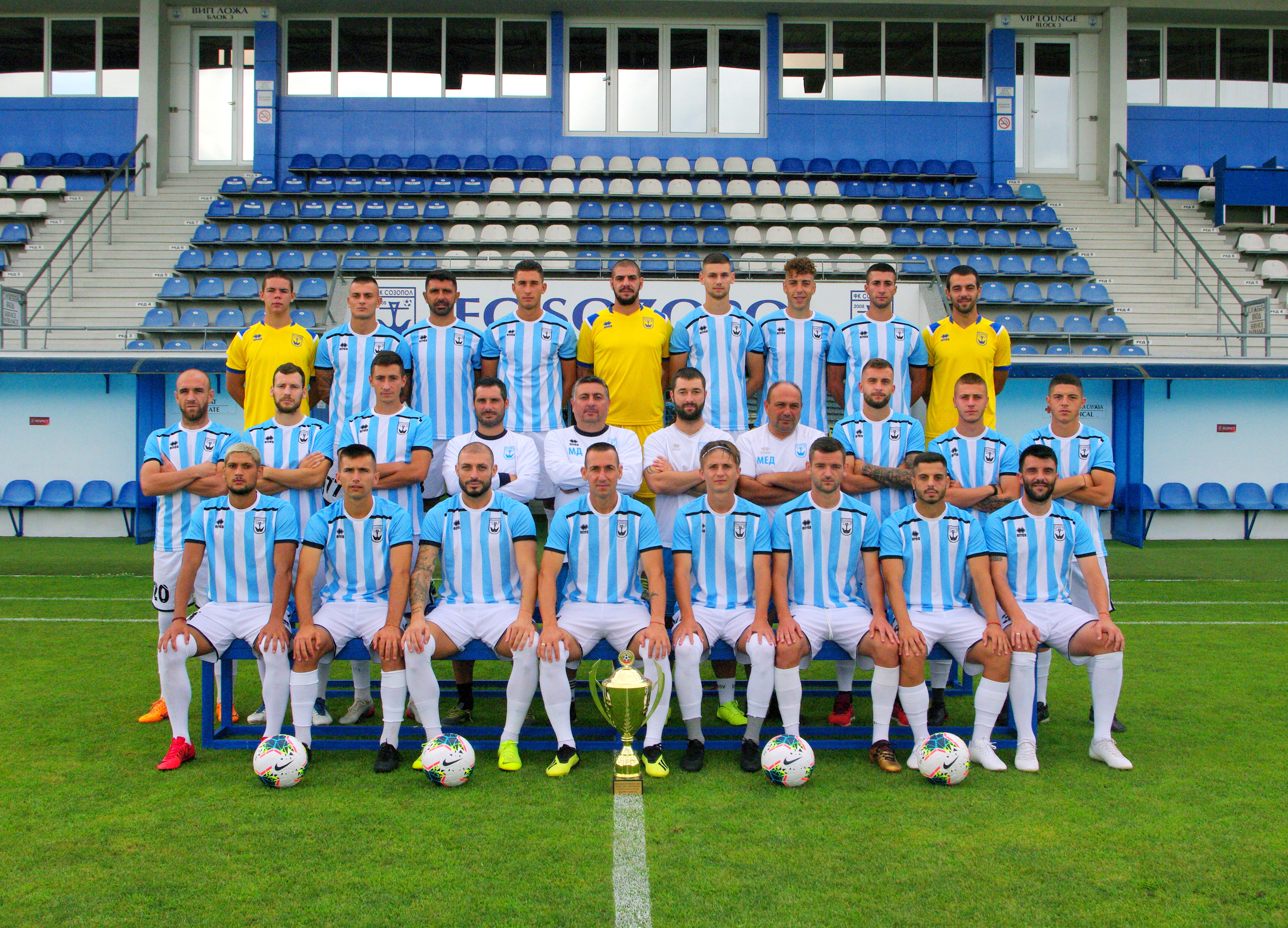

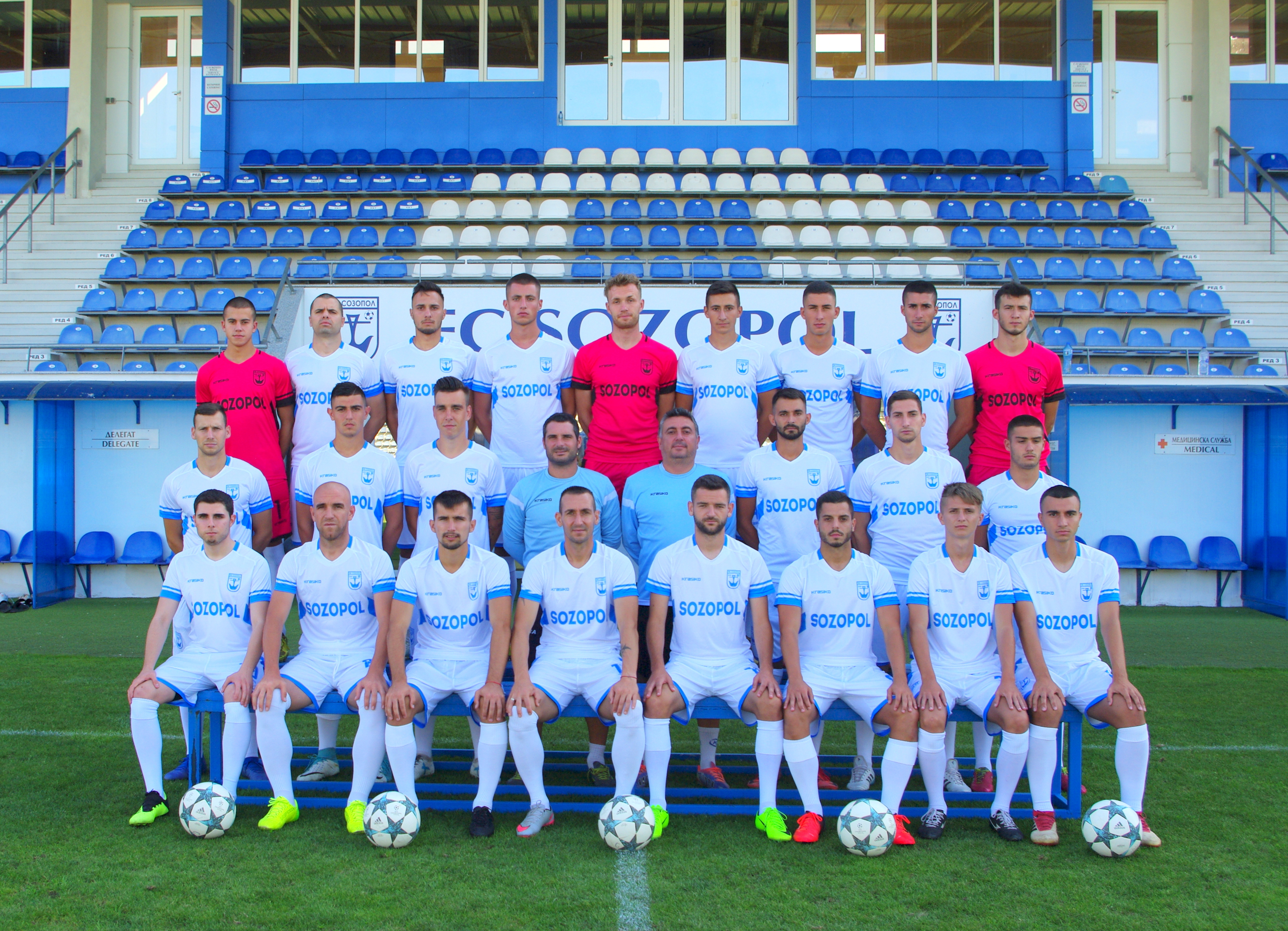

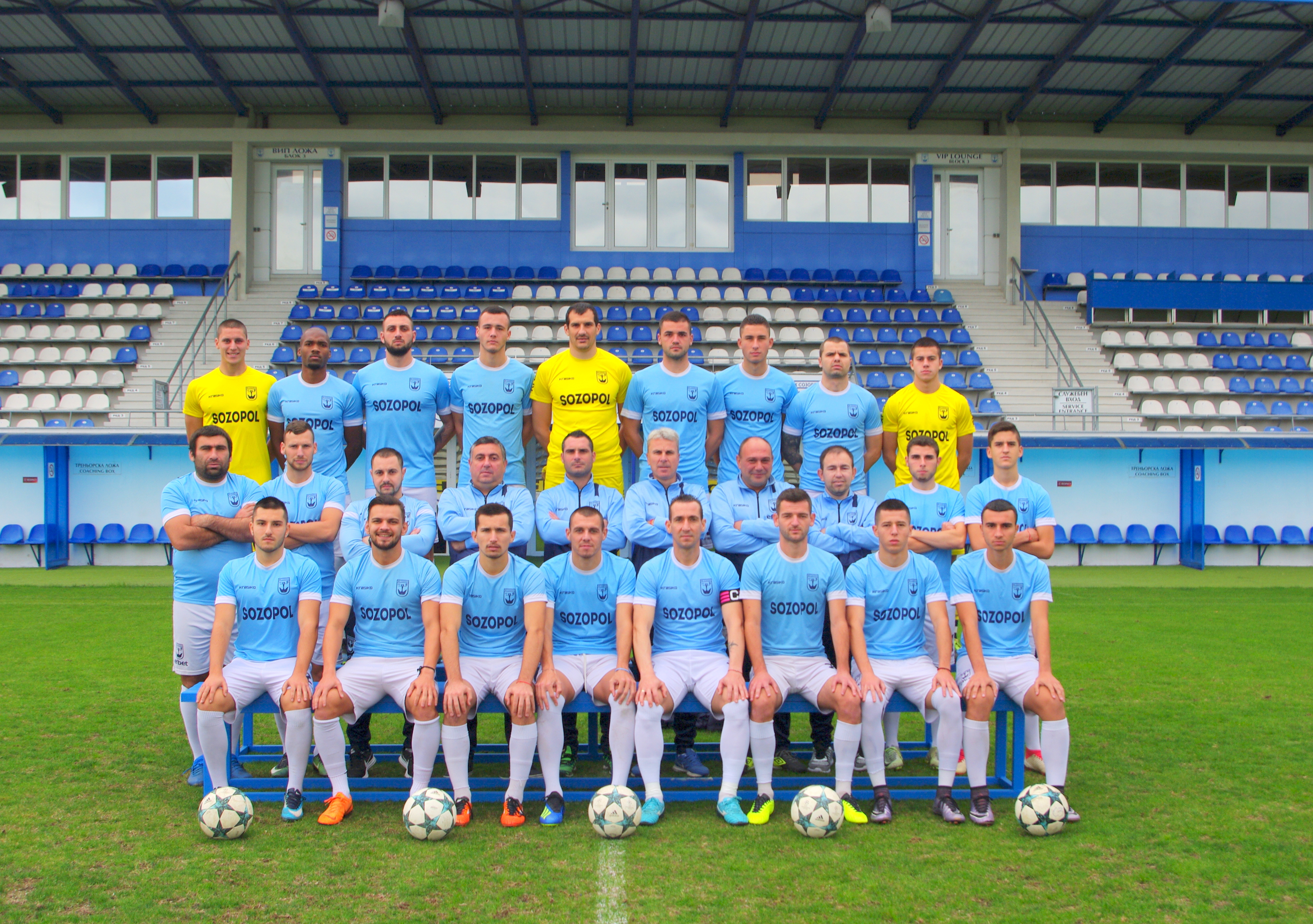

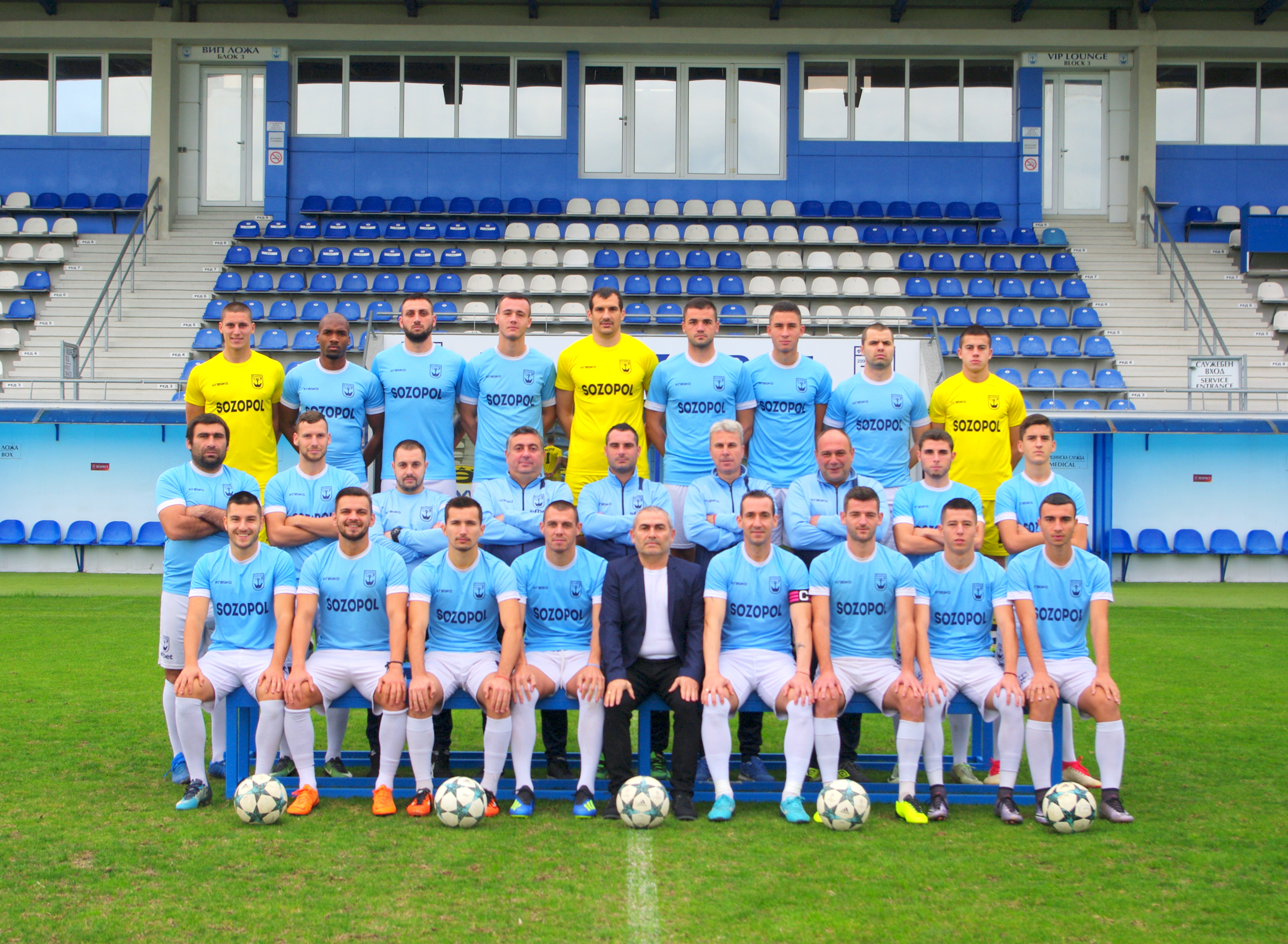

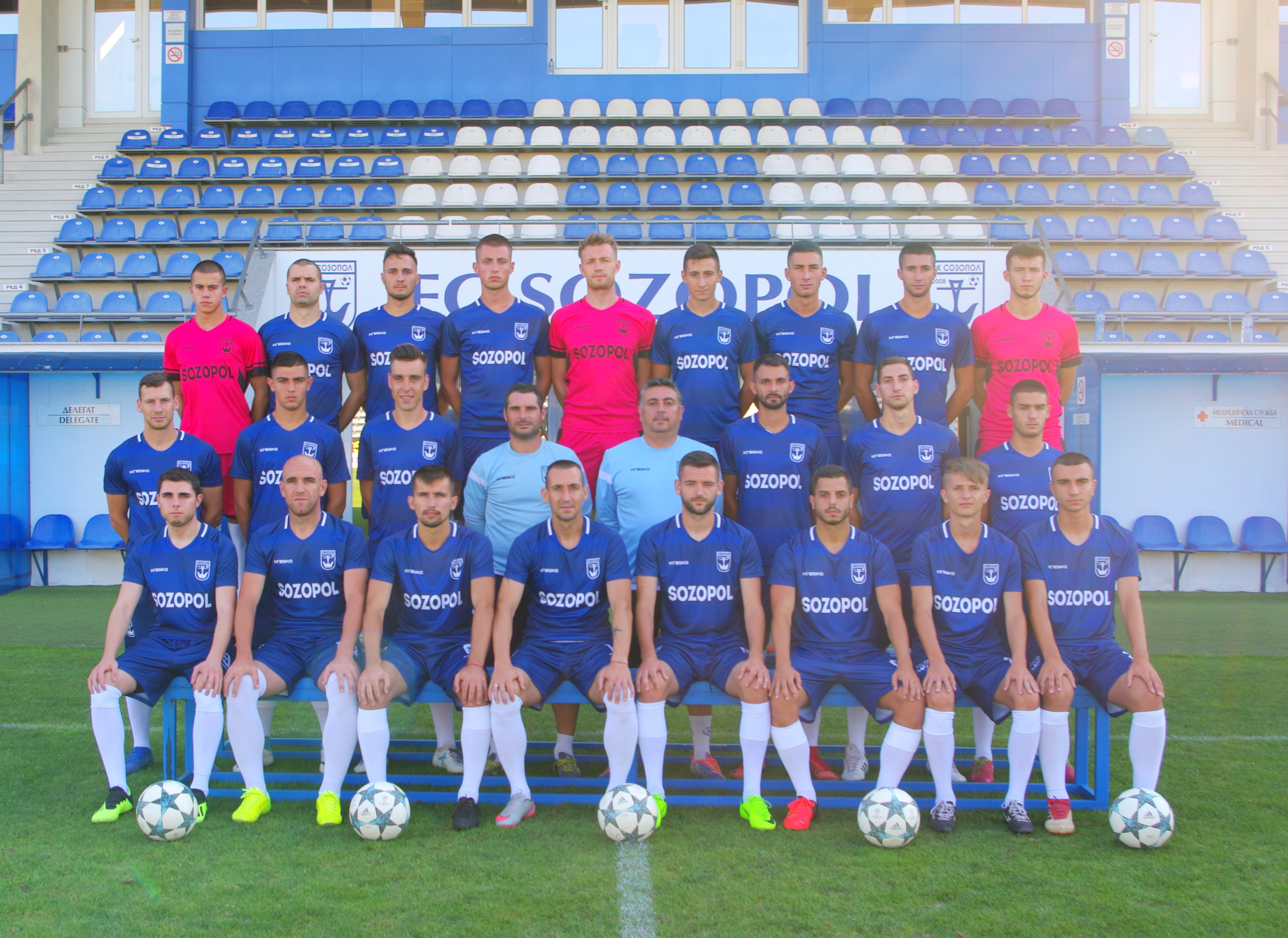

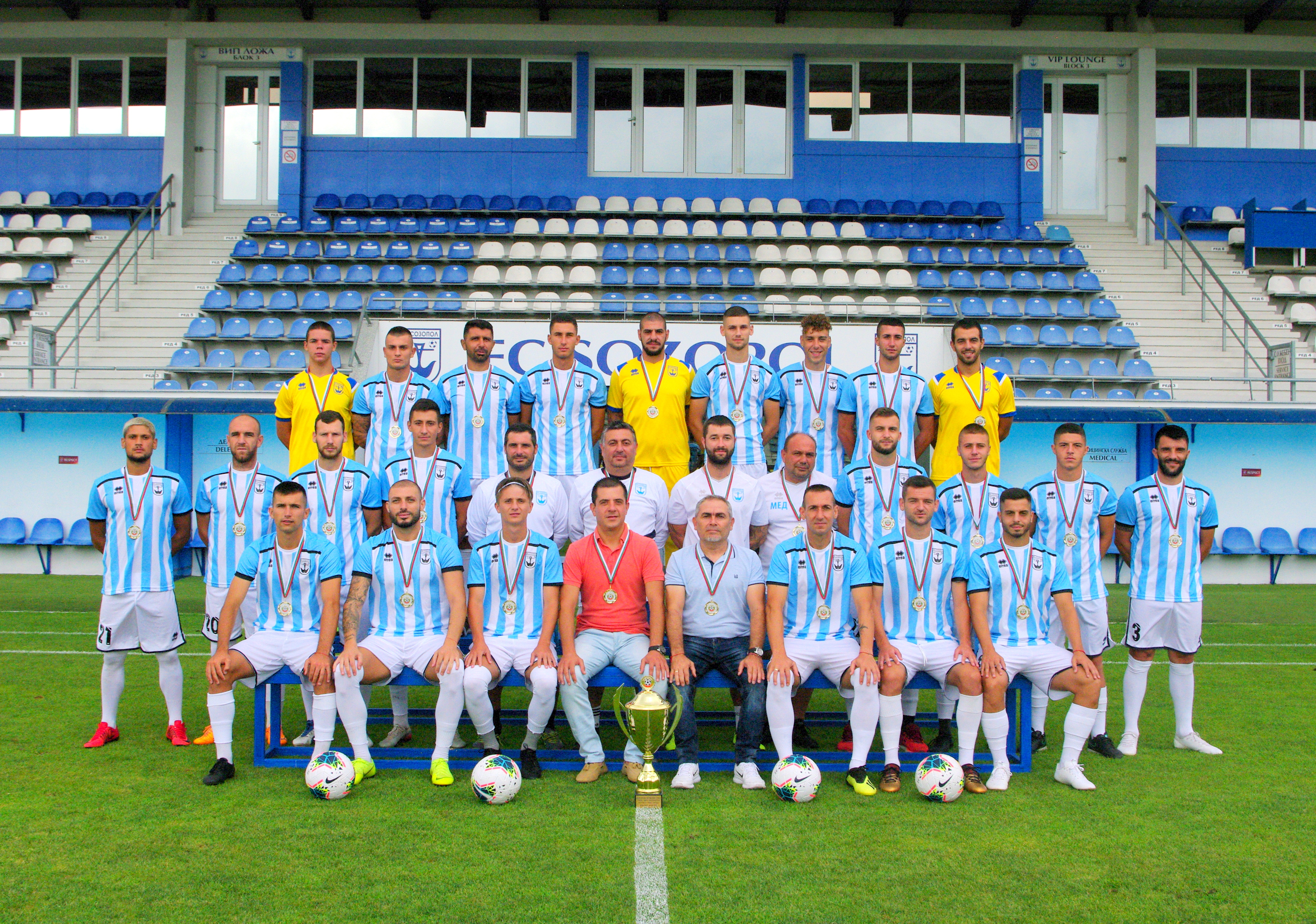

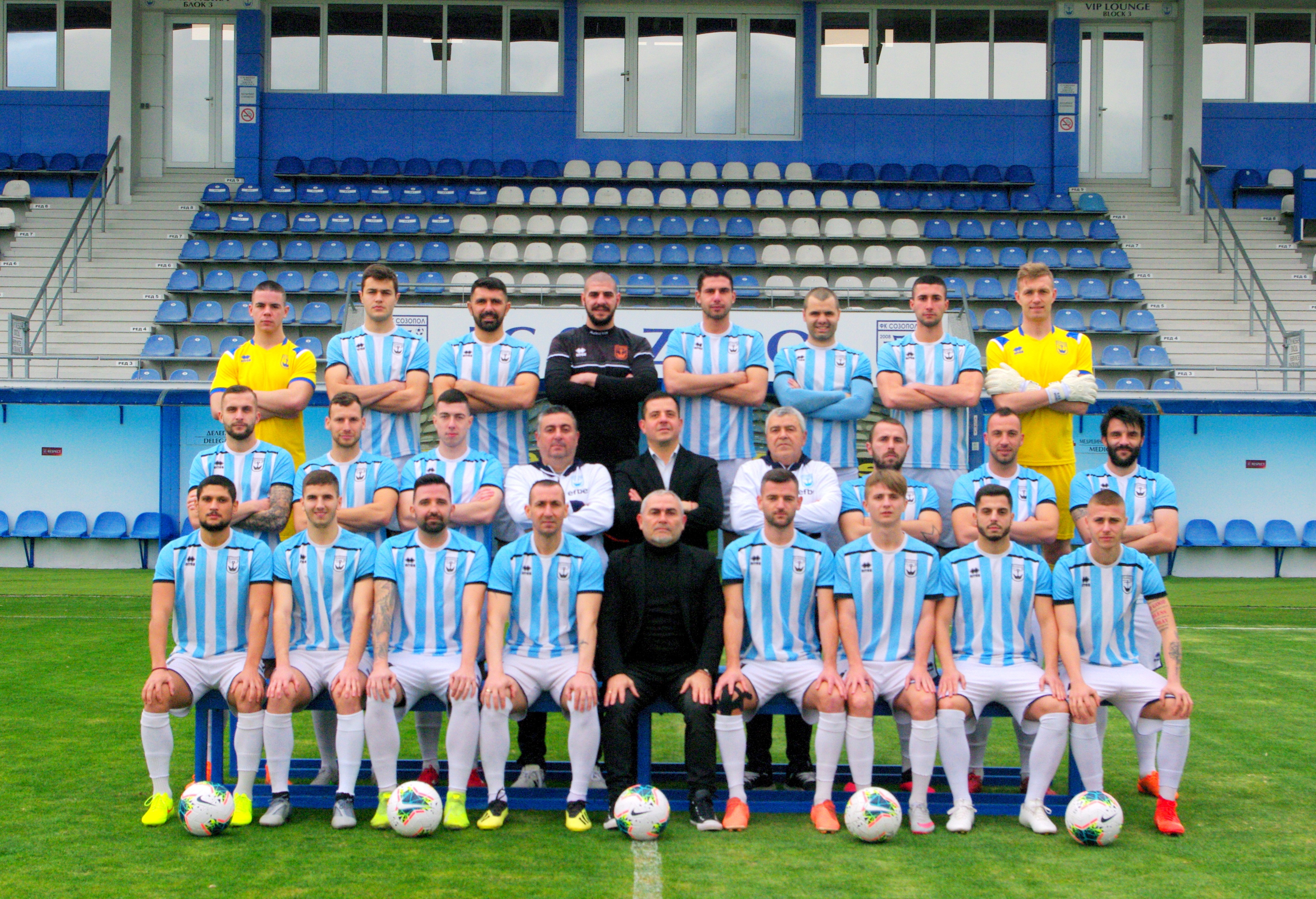

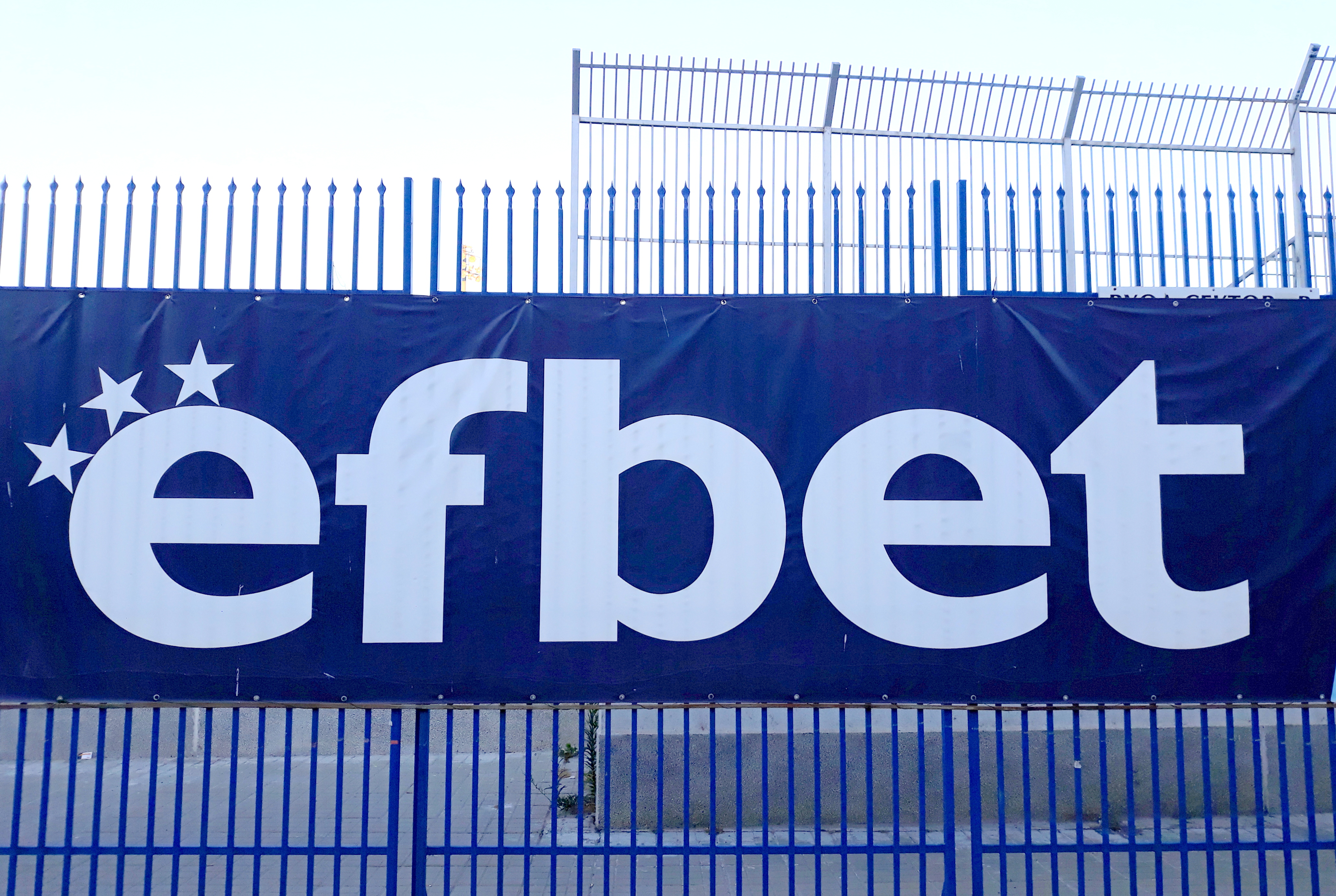

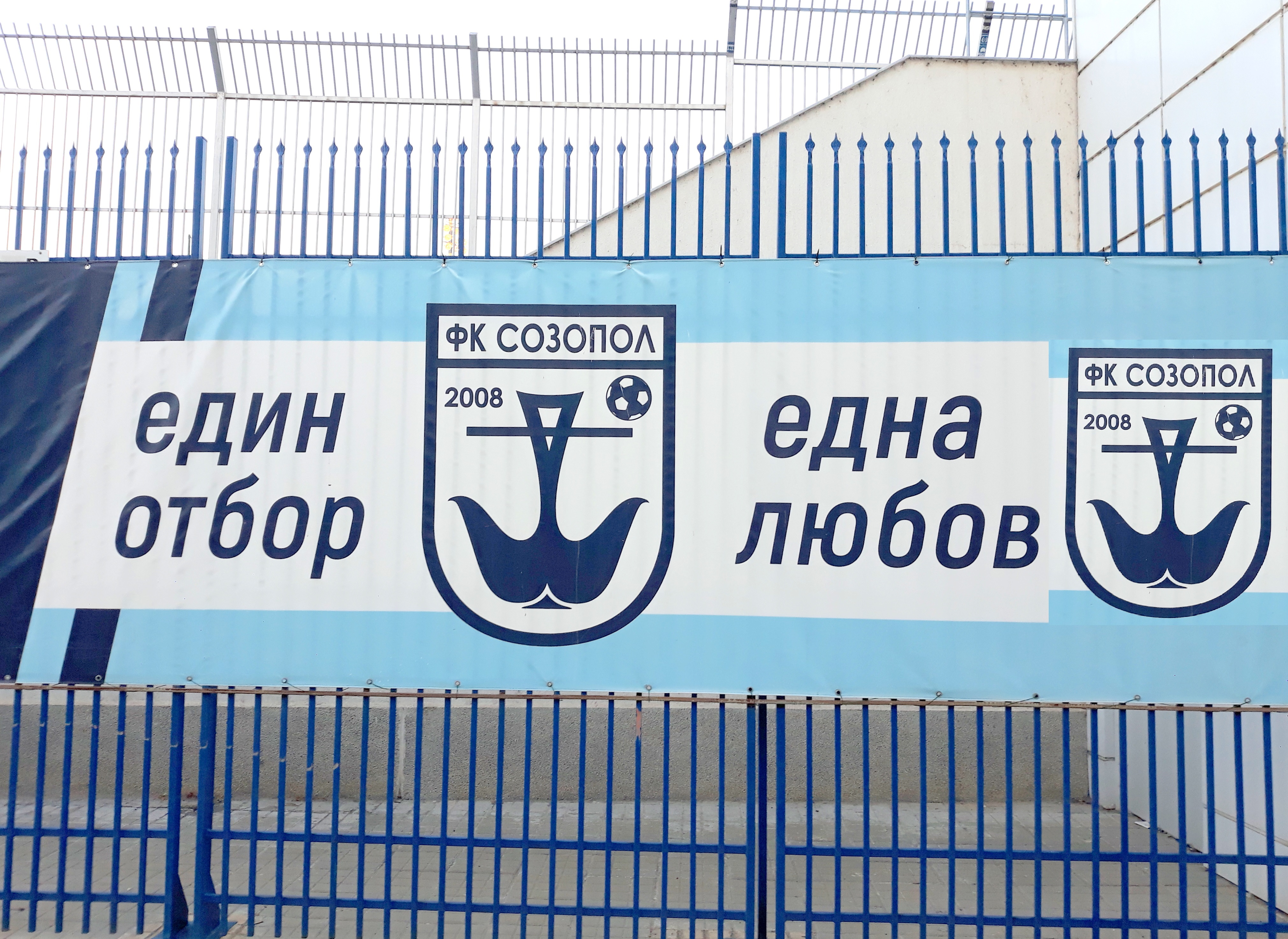

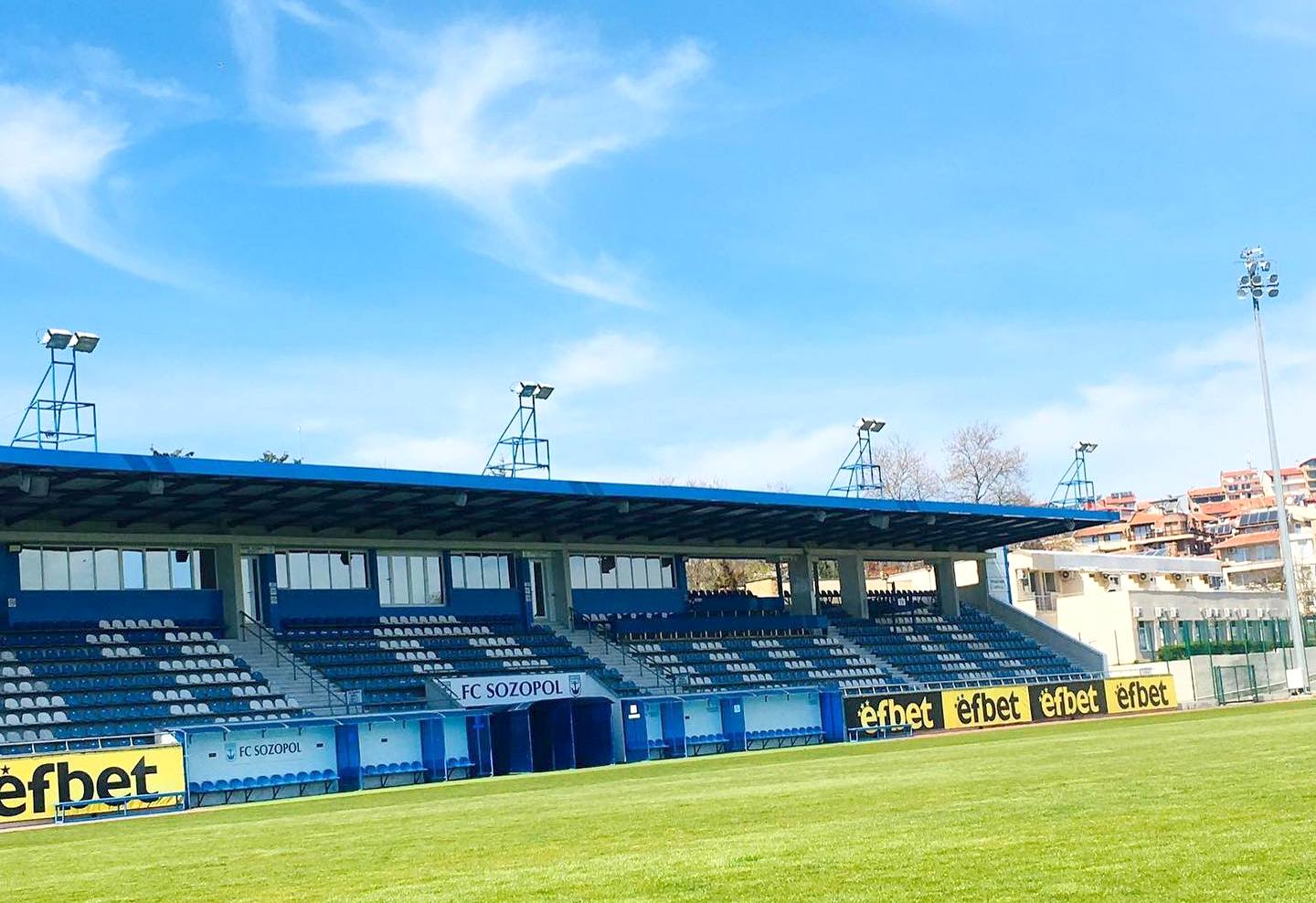

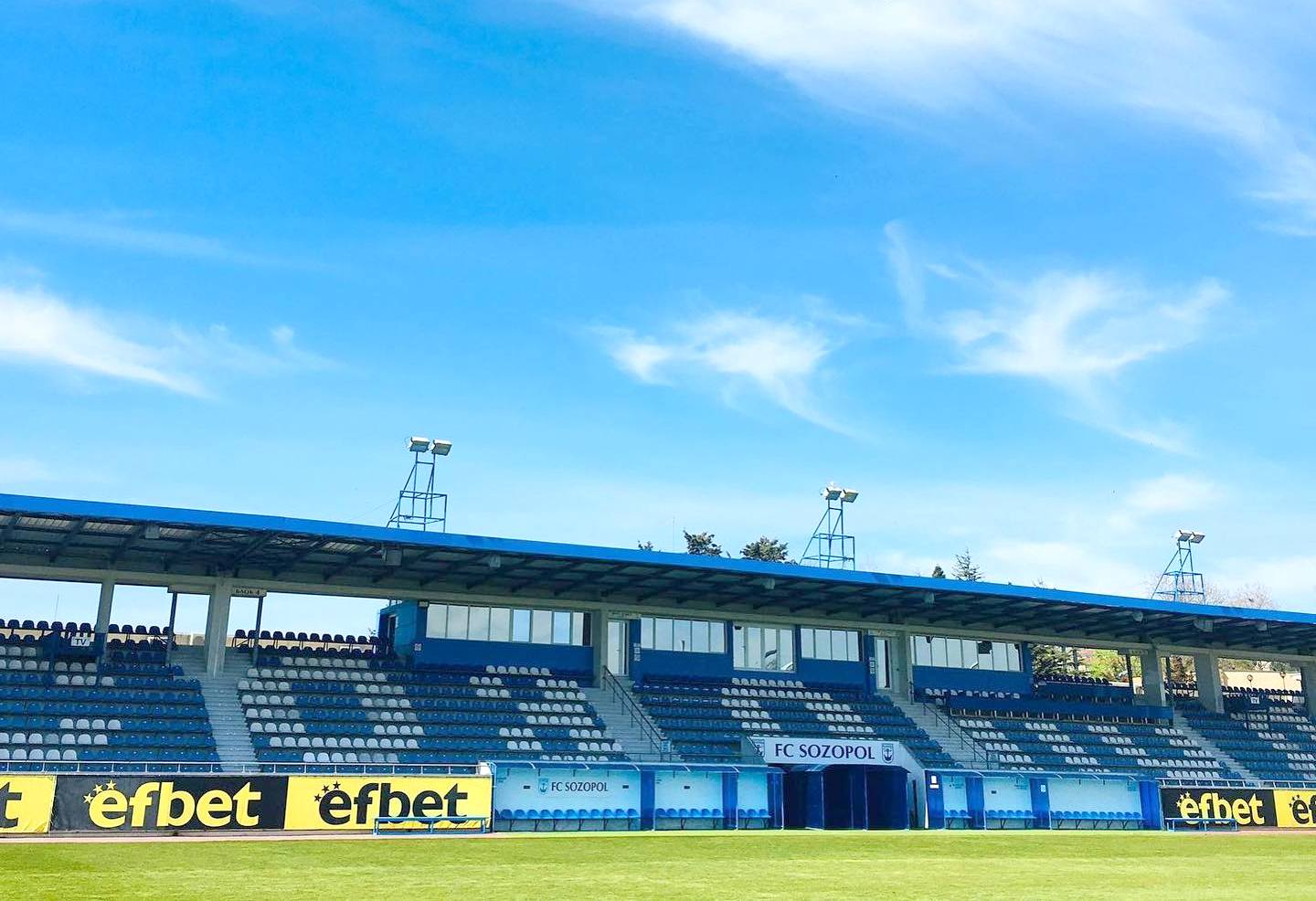

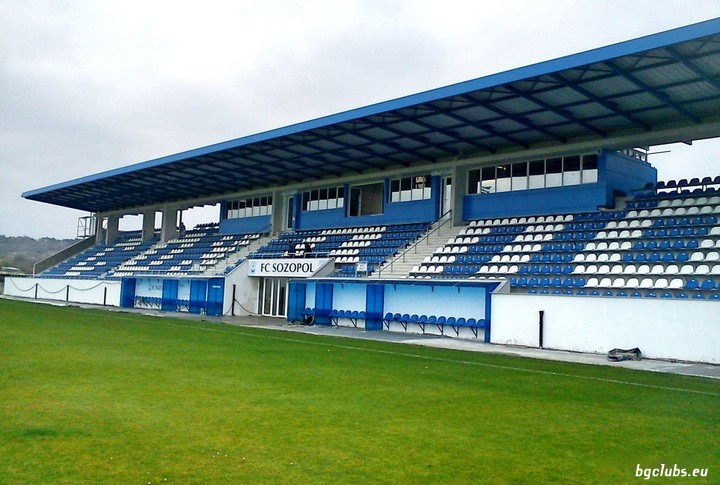

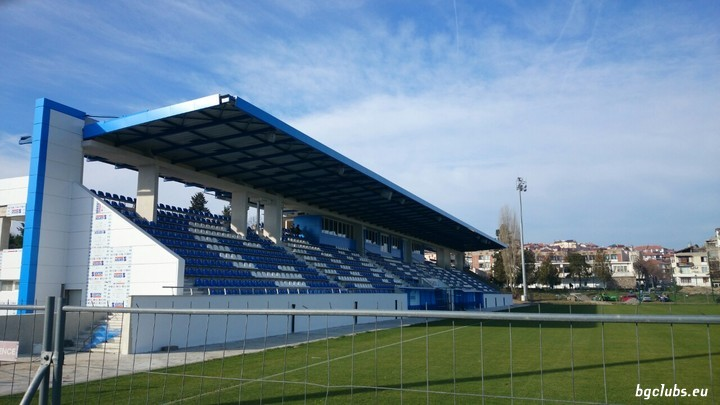

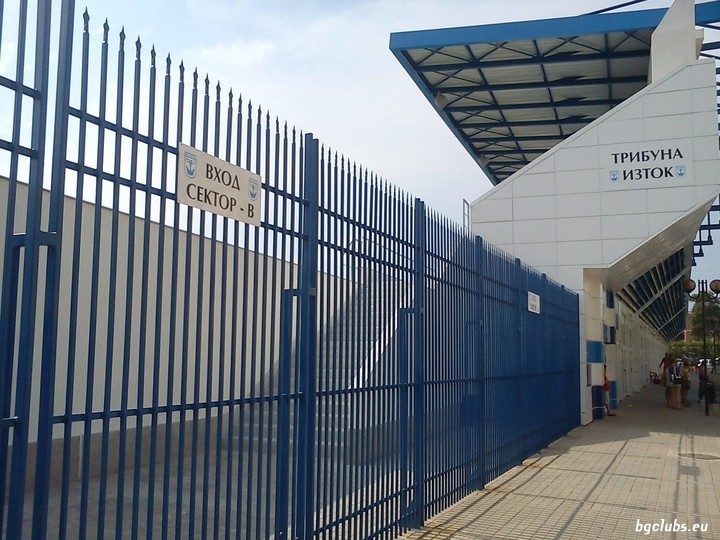

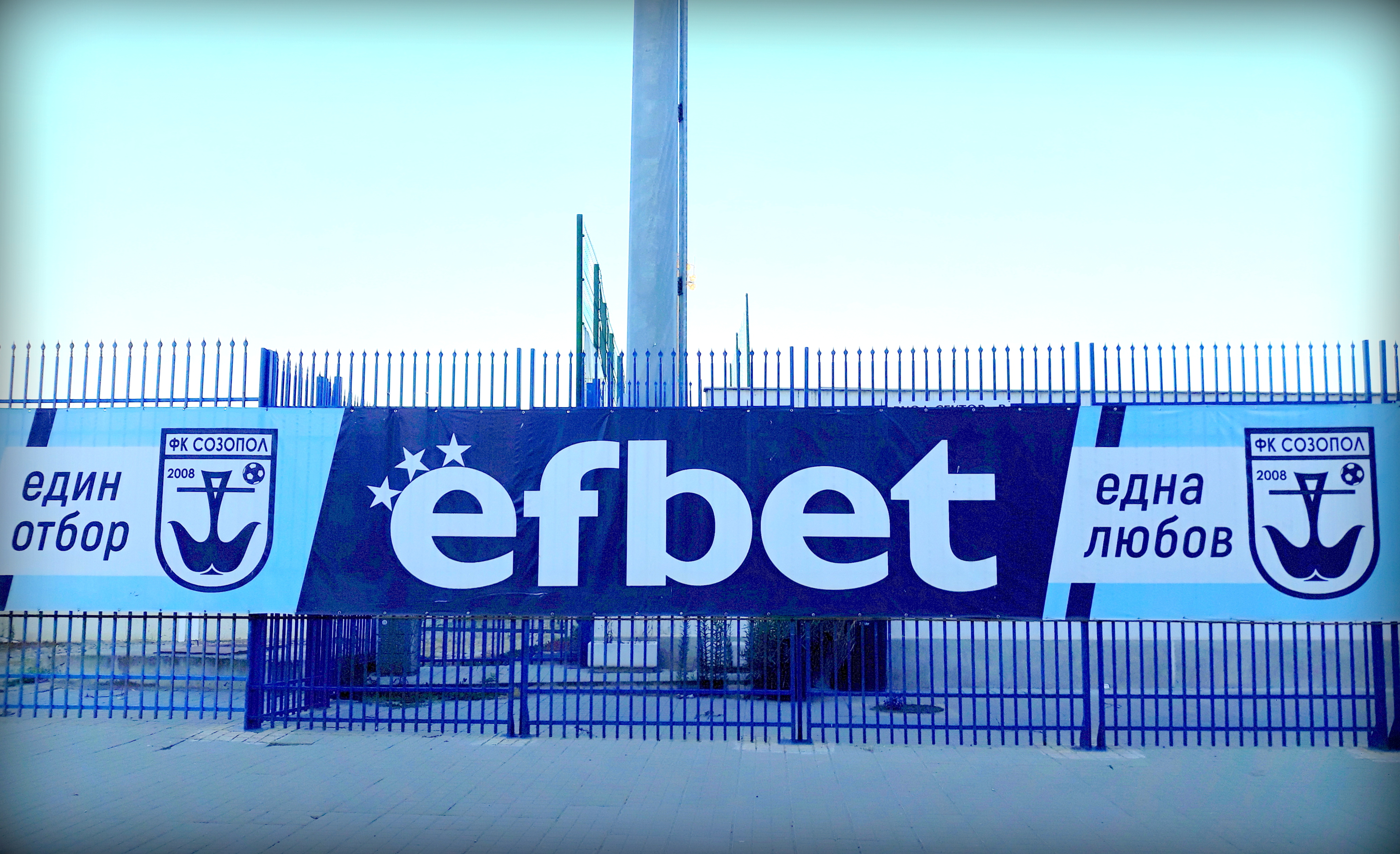

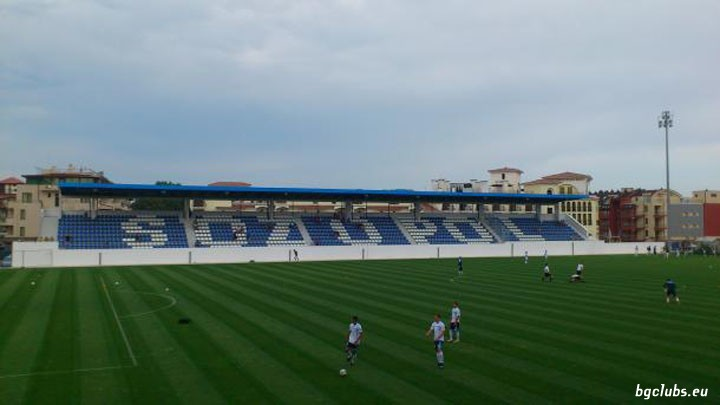

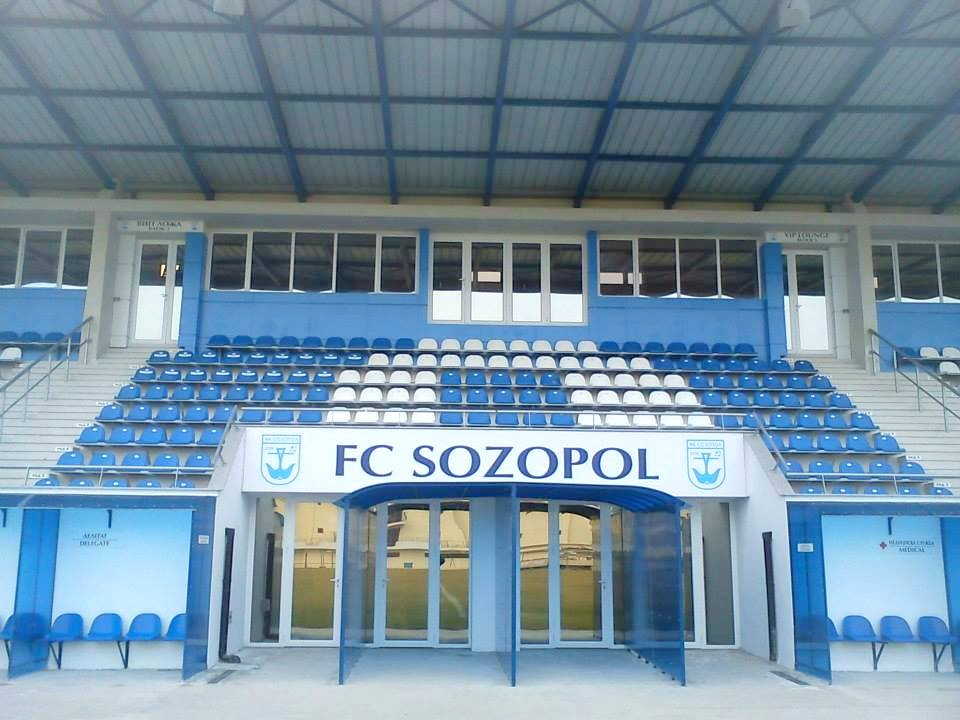

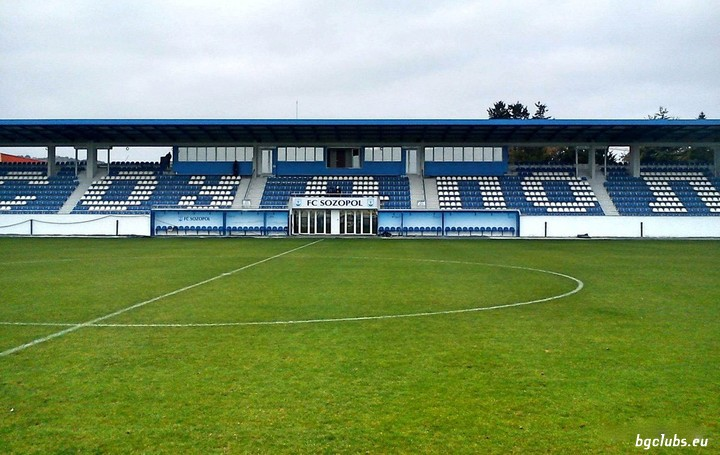

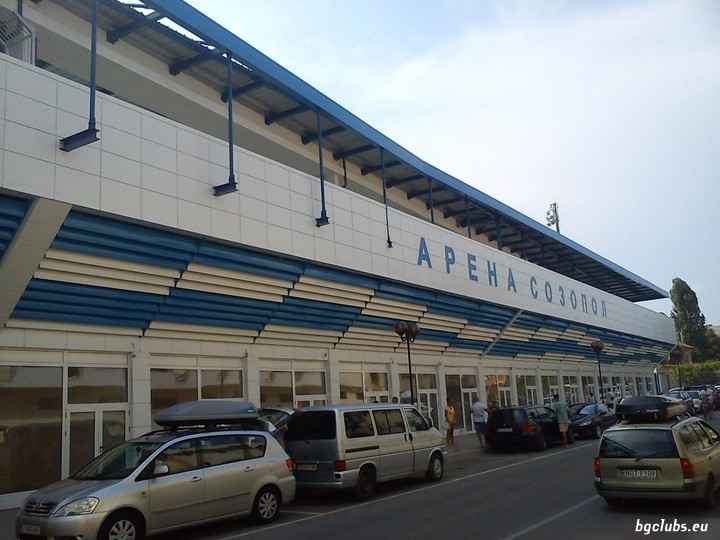

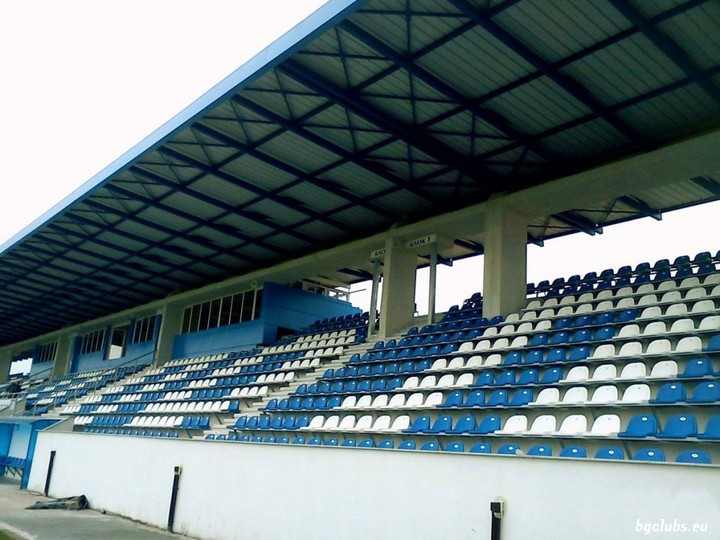
