= 2015 UEFA European Under-17 Championship =

2015 УЕФА Европейско първенство за юноши до 17 години

Tournament details
- Host country: Bulgaria
- Dates: 6–22 May
- Teams: 16 (from 1 confederation)
- Venue: 4 (in 4 host cities)

Final positions
- Champions: France (2nd title)
- Runners-up: Germany

Tournament statistics
- Matches played: 33
- Goals scored: 59 (1.79 per match)
- Attendance: 77,868 (2,360 per match)
- Top scorer: (France) Odsonne Édouard (8 goals)
- Best player: (France) Odsonne Édouard

The 2015 UEFA European Under-17 Championship was the 14th edition of the UEFA European Under-17 Championship (33rd edition if the Under-16 era was also included), the annual European youth football competition contested by the men's under-17 national teams of the member associations of UEFA. Bulgaria hosted the tournament. The finals featured 16 teams for the first time since 2002, as the number of teams was increased from eight in the previous tournament. Players born on or after 1 January 1998 were eligible to participate in this competition.

The final tournament also acted as the UEFA qualifier for the 2015 FIFA U-17 World Cup in Chile, with six teams qualifying (the four semi-finalists and the two winners of play-off matches between the losing quarter-finalists).

Each match lasted 80 minutes, consisting of two halves of 40 minutes, with an interval of 15 minutes.

== Qualification ==
All 54 UEFA nations entered the competition and with the hosts Bulgaria qualifying automatically, the other 53 teams competed in the qualifying competition to determine the remaining 15 spots in the final tournament. The qualifying competition consisted of two rounds: Qualifying round, which took place in autumn 2014 and Elite round, which took place in spring 2015.

=== Qualified teams ===
The following 16 teams qualified for the final tournament.

Note: All appearance statistics include only U-17 era (since 2002).

Team	Method of qualification	Finals appearance	Last appearance	Previous best performance
Bulgaria	Hosts	1st	Debut	Debut
France	Elite round Group 1 winners	9th	2012	Champions (2004)
Spain	Elite round Group 1 runners-up	9th	2010	Champions (2007, 2008)
Croatia	Elite round Group 2 winners	3rd	2013	Fourth place (2005)
Belgium	Elite round Group 3 winners	4th	2012	Semi-finals (2007)
Netherlands	Elite round Group 3 runners-up	9th	2014	Champions (2011, 2012)
Greece	Elite round Group 4 winners	2nd	2010	Group stage (2010)
Republic of Ireland	Elite round Group 4 runners-up	2nd	2008	Group stage (2008)
Austria	Elite round Group 5 winners	4th	2013	Third place (2003)
Russia	Elite round Group 5 runners-up	3rd	2013	Champions (2006, 2013)
England	Elite round Group 6 winners	10th	2014	Champions (2010, 2014)
Slovenia	Elite round Group 6 runners-up	2nd	2012	Group stage (2012)
Czech Republic	Elite round Group 7 winners	5th	2011	Runners-up (2006)
Scotland	Elite round Group 7 runners-up	3rd	2014	Semi-finals (2014)
Germany	Elite round Group 8 winners	8th	2014	Champions (2009)
Italy	Elite round Group 8 runners-up	5th	2013	Runners-up (2013)

Notes

1. The best seven runners-up among all eight elite round groups qualified for the final tournament.

=== Final draw ===
The final draw was held in Pomorie, Bulgaria on 2 April 2015, 14:00 EEST (UTC+3). The 16 teams were drawn into four groups of four teams. There were no seeding except that the hosts Bulgaria were assigned to position A1 in the draw.

== Venues ==
The competition was played at four venues in four host cities: Beroe Stadium (in Stara Zagora), Hadzhi Dimitar Stadium (in Sliven), Lazur Stadium (in Burgas), and Arena Sozopol (in Sozopol).

Stara Zagora	Sliven	2015 UEFA European Under-17 Championship is located in Bulgaria	Burgas	Sozopol
Beroe Stadium	Hadzhi Dimitar Stadium	2015 UEFA European Under-17 Championship is located in Bulgaria	Lazur Stadium	Arena Sozopol
Capacity: 11,684	Capacity: 8,500	2015 UEFA European Under-17 Championship is located in Bulgaria	Capacity: 19,004	Capacity: 2,599

== Squads ==
Each national team had to submit a squad of 18 players.

== Match officials ==
A total of 9 referees, 12 assistant referees and 4 fourth officials were appointed for the final tournament.

Referees

- (Romania) Marius Avram
- (Serbia) Danilo Grujić
- (Switzerland) Adrien Jaccottet
- (Denmark) Mads-Kristoffer Kristoffersen
- (Belgium) Erik Lambrechts
- (Moldova) Dumitru Muntean
- (Poland) Paweł Raczkowski
- (Israel) Roi Reinshreiber
- (Malta) Alan Mario Sant

Assistant referees

- (Armenia) Erik Arevshatyan
- (Albania) Rejdi Avdo
- (Sweden) Mehmet Culum
- (Azerbaijan) Namik Huseynov
- (Wales) Gareth Jones
- (Estonia) Sten Klaasen
- (Finland) Ville Koskiniemi
- (Belarus) Aleh Maslianka
- (Portugal) Nuno Pereira
- (Latvia) Romans Platonovs
- (Lithuania) Dovydas Sužiedėlis
- (Slovakia) Erik Weiss

Fourth officials

- (Bulgaria) Georgi Kabakov
- (Bulgaria) Tsvetan Krastev
- (Bulgaria) Nikola Popov
- (Bulgaria) Ivaylo Stoyanov

== Group stage ==
Map of the 2015 UEFA European Under-17 Championship finalist teams and their performances.

Group winners and runners-up advanced to the quarter-finals.

Tiebreakers

if two or more teams were equal on points on completion of the group matches, the following tie-breaking criteria were applied, in the order given, to determine the rankings:

1. Higher number of points obtained in the group matches played among the teams in question;
2. Superior goal difference resulting from the group matches played among the teams in question;
3. Higher number of goals scored in the group matches played among the teams in question;
4. If, after having applied criteria 1 to 3, teams still had an equal ranking, criteria 1 to 3 were reapplied exclusively to the group matches between the teams in question to determine their final rankings. If this procedure did not lead to a decision, criteria 5 to 9 applied;
5. Superior goal difference in all group matches;
6. Higher number of goals scored in all group matches;
7. If only two teams had the same number of points, and they were tied according to criteria 1 to 6 after having met in the last round of the group stage, their rankings were determined by a penalty shoot-out (not used if more than two teams had the same number of points, or if their rankings were not relevant for qualification for the next stage).
8. Lower disciplinary points total based only on yellow and red cards received in the group matches (red card = 3 points, yellow card = 1 point, expulsion for two yellow cards in one match = 3 points);
9. Drawing of lots.

All times were local, EEST (UTC+3).

=== Group A ===
Pos	Team	Pld	W	D	L	GF	GA	GD	Pts	Qualification
1	Croatia	3	2	1	0	3	0	+3	7	Knockout stage
2	Spain	3	1	2	0	3	2	+1	5	Knockout stage
3	Austria	3	0	2	1	2	3	−1	2	
4	Bulgaria (H)	3	0	1	2	2	5	−3	1	

Source: UEFA
(H) Hosts
6 May 2015
15:00

Spain	1–1	Austria
Aleñá 46' (pen.)	Report	Lovrić 62'

Lazur Stadium, Burgas
Attendance: 1,180
Referee: Mads-Kristoffer Kristoffersen (Denmark)
6 May 2015
19:00

Bulgaria	0–2	Croatia
	Report	Babić 24'; Blečić 83'

Beroe Stadium, Stara Zagora
Attendance: 10,640
Referee: Paweł Raczkowski (Poland)

9 May 2015
13:00

Croatia	1–0	Austria
Lovren 52'	Report

Arena Sozopol, Sozopol
Attendance: 1,732
Referee: Dumitru Muntean (Moldova)
9 May 2015
15:00

Bulgaria	1–2	Spain
Yordanov 35'	Report	Zalazar 11'; Villalba 47'

Lazur Stadium, Burgas
Attendance: 9,240
Referee: Marius Avram (Romania)

12 May 2015
17:00

Austria	1–1	Bulgaria
Filip 34'	Report	Yordanov 43'

Arena Sozopol, Sozopol
Attendance: 2,213
Referee: Danilo Grujić (Serbia)
12 May 2015
17:00

Croatia	0–0	Spain
	Report

Hadzhi Dimitar Stadium, Sliven
Attendance: 1,782
Referee: Erik Lambrechts (Belgium)

=== Group B ===
Pos	Team	Pld	W	D	L	GF	GA	GD	Pts	Qualification
1	Germany	3	3	0	0	7	0	+7	9	Knockout stage
2	Belgium	3	2	0	1	4	2	+2	6	Knockout stage
3	Czech Republic	3	1	0	2	1	7	−6	3	
4	Slovenia	3	0	0	3	0	3	−3	0	

Source: UEFA
6 May 2015
16:00

Czech Republic	1–0	Slovenia
Lingr 44'	Report

Hadzhi Dimitar Stadium, Sliven
Attendance: 754
Referee: Marius Avram (Romania)
6 May 2015
19:00

Belgium	0–2	Germany
	Report	Passlack 43'; Schmidt 46'

Lazur Stadium, Burgas
Attendance: 612
Referee: Danilo Grujić (Serbia)

9 May 2015
16:00

Czech Republic	0–3	Belgium
	Report	Azzaoui 29', 75' (pen.); Van Vaerenbergh 78'

Arena Sozopol, Sozopol
Attendance: 1,228
Referee: Mads-Kristoffer Kristoffersen (Denmark)
9 May 2015
19:00

Slovenia	0–1	Germany
	Report	Eggestein 8'

Lazur Stadium, Burgas
Attendance: 1,508
Referee: Adrien Jaccottet (Switzerland)

12 May 2015
19:00

Germany	4–0	Czech Republic
Passlack 10', 40+2'; Karakas 33'; Sağlam 53'	Report

Beroe Stadium, Stara Zagora
Attendance: 1,206
Referee: Alan Mario Sant (Malta)
12 May 2015
19:00

Slovenia	0–1	Belgium
	Report	Van Vaerenbergh 80+3'

Lazur Stadium, Burgas
Attendance: 592
Referee: Roi Reinshreiber (Israel)

=== Group C ===
Pos	Team	Pld	W	D	L	GF	GA	GD	Pts	Qualification
1	France	3	3	0	0	7	0	+7	9	Knockout stage
2	Russia	3	1	1	1	4	3	+1	4	Knockout stage
3	Greece	3	1	1	1	3	3	0	4	
4	Scotland	3	0	0	3	0	8	−8	0	

Source: UEFA
7 May 2015
16:00

Greece	2–2	Russia
Kirtzialidis 37'; Pavlidis 64'	Report	Pletnyov 59'; Denisov 72'

Arena Sozopol, Sozopol
Attendance: 2,000
Referee: Erik Lambrechts (Belgium)
7 May 2015
17:00

Scotland	0–5	France
	Report	Ikoné 18', 20'; Édouard 25'; Boutobba 35'; Doucouré 47'

Beroe Stadium, Stara Zagora
Attendance: 326
Referee: Alan Mario Sant (Malta)

10 May 2015
16:00

Russia	0–1	France
	Report	Édouard 50'

Hadzhi Dimitar Stadium, Sliven
Attendance: 2,255
Referee: Danilo Grujić (Serbia)
10 May 2015
17:00

Greece	1–0	Scotland
Pavlidis 39'	Report

Arena Sozopol, Sozopol
Attendance: 1,154
Referee: Paweł Raczkowski (Poland)

13 May 2015
17:00

France	1–0	Greece
Rambaud 80+4'	Report

Arena Sozopol, Sozopol
Attendance: 983
Referee: Adrien Jaccottet (Switzerland)
13 May 2015
17:00

Russia	2–0	Scotland
Denisov 52'; Pletnyov 65'	Report

Hadzhi Dimitar Stadium, Sliven
Attendance: 885
Referee: Dumitru Muntean (Moldova)

=== Group D ===
Pos	Team	Pld	W	D	L	GF	GA	GD	Pts	Qualification
1	England	3	2	1	0	3	1	+2	7	Knockout stage
2	Italy	3	1	1	1	3	2	+1	4	Knockout stage
3	Netherlands	3	0	3	0	2	2	0	3	
4	Republic of Ireland	3	0	1	2	0	3	−3	1	

Source: UEFA
7 May 2015
13:00

Republic of Ireland	0–0	Netherlands
	Report

Arena Sozopol, Sozopol
Attendance: 1,500
Referee: Dumitru Muntean (Moldova)
7 May 2015
19:00

Italy	0–1	England
	Report	Edwards 47'

Lazur Stadium, Burgas
Attendance: 2,530
Referee: Adrien Jaccottet (Switzerland)

10 May 2015
16:00

Republic of Ireland	0–2	Italy
	Report	Lo Faso 9'; Mazzocchi 56'

Beroe Stadium, Stara Zagora
Attendance: 573
Referee: Roi Reinshreiber (Israel)
10 May 2015
20:00

Netherlands	1–1	England
Boultam 56' (pen.)	Report	Fosu-Mensah 18' (o.g.)

Beroe Stadium, Stara Zagora
Attendance: 1,063
Referee: Erik Lambrechts (Belgium)

13 May 2015
19:00

England	1–0	Republic of Ireland
Edwards 71'	Report

Beroe Stadium, Stara Zagora
Attendance: 974
Referee: Paweł Raczkowski (Poland)
13 May 2015
19:00

Netherlands	1–1	Italy
Giraudo 63' (o.g.)	Report	Cutrone 6'

Lazur Stadium, Burgas
Attendance: 1,258
Referee: Mads-Kristoffer Kristoffersen (Denmark)

== Knockout stage ==
In the knockout stage, penalty shoot-out was used to decide the winner if necessary (no extra time was played).

=== Bracket ===
Quarter-finals
15 May – Burgas
Croatia	1 (3)
Belgium (p)	1 (5)
16 May – Stara Zagora
France	3
Italy	0
15 May – Stara Zagora
Germany (p)	0 (4)
Spain	0 (2)
16 May – Burgas
England	0
Russia	1

Semi-finals
19 May – Burgas
Belgium	1 (1)
France (p)	1 (2)
19 May – Stara Zagora
Germany	1
Russia	0

Final
22 May – Burgas
France	4
Germany	1

FIFA U-17 World Cup play-offs
19 May – Sozopol
Croatia	1
Italy	0
19 May – Sliven
Spain	0 (3)
England (p)	0 (5)

=== Quarter-finals ===
Winners qualified for 2015 FIFA U-17 World Cup. Losers played in FIFA U-17 World Cup play-offs.

15 May 2015
16:00

Croatia	1–1	Belgium
Majić 34'	Report	Azzaoui 53'
Penalties
Moro (penalty missed); Brekalo (penalty scored); Lovren (penalty scored); Sosa (penalty scored)	3–5	(penalty scored) Janssens; (penalty scored) Van Vaerenbergh; (penalty scored) Daneels; (penalty scored) Ademoglu; (penalty scored) Azzaoui

Lazur Stadium, Burgas
Attendance: 1,073
Referee: Marius Avram (Romania)

15 May 2015
19:00

Germany	0–0	Spain
	Report
Penalties
Gül (penalty scored); Janelt (penalty scored); Passlack (penalty scored); Özcan (penalty scored)	4–2	(penalty scored) Pepelu; (penalty scored) Olmo; (penalty missed) Aleñá; (penalty missed) Rodríguez

Beroe Stadium, Stara Zagora
Attendance: 2,423
Referee: Roi Reinshreiber (Israel)

16 May 2015
16:00

England	0–1	Russia
	Report	Tatayev 29'

Lazur Stadium, Burgas
Attendance: 2,085
Referee: Alan Mario Sant (Malta)

16 May 2015
19:00

France	3–0	Italy
Édouard 5', 72'; Ikoné 53'	Report

Beroe Stadium, Stara Zagora
Attendance: 2,114
Referee: Danilo Grujić (Serbia)

=== FIFA U-17 World Cup play-offs ===
Winners qualified for 2015 FIFA U-17 World Cup.

19 May 2015
16:00

Croatia	1–0	Italy
Moro 15'	Report

Arena Sozopol, Sozopol
Attendance: 344
Referee: Mads-Kristoffer Kristoffersen (Denmark)

19 May 2015
16:00

Spain	0–0	England
	Report
Penalties
Pepelu (penalty scored); Olmo (penalty missed); Villalba (penalty scored); Martín (penalty scored)	3–5	(penalty scored) Edwards; (penalty scored) Ugbo; (penalty scored) Willock; (penalty scored) Oxford; (penalty scored) Suliman

Hadzhi Dimitar Stadium, Sliven
Attendance: 984
Referee: Dumitri Muntean (Moldova)

=== Semi-finals ===
19 May 2015
16:00

Belgium	1–1	France
Seigers 52'	Report	Édouard 23'
Penalties
Janssens (penalty missed); Van Vaerenbergh (penalty scored); Daneels (penalty missed); Ademoglu (penalty missed); Azzaoui (penalty missed)	1–2	(penalty missed) Janvier; (penalty scored) Cognat; (penalty missed) Pelican; (penalty missed) Zidane; (penalty scored) Édouard

Lazur Stadium, Burgas
Attendance: 1,850
Referee: Adrien Jaccottet (Switzerland)

19 May 2015
19:00

Germany	1–0	Russia
Serra 68'	Report

Beroe Stadium, Stara Zagora
Attendance: 4,127
Referee: Marius Avram (Romania)

=== Final ===
22 May 2015
20:00

France	4–1	Germany
Édouard 40', 47', 70'; Gül 83' (o.g.)	Report	Karakas 50'

Lazur Stadium, Burgas
Attendance: 14,680
Referee: Paweł Raczkowski (Poland)

== Goalscorers ==
8 goals

- (France) Odsonne Édouard

3 goals

- (Belgium) Ismail Azzaoui
- (France) Jonathan Ikoné
- (Germany) Felix Passlack

2 goals

- (Belgium) Dennis Van Vaerenbergh
- (Bulgaria) Tonislav Yordanov
- (England) Marcus Edwards
- (Germany) Erdinc Karakas
- (Greece) Vangelis Pavlidis
- (Russia) Yegor Denisov
- (Russia) Dmitri Pletnyov

1 goal

- (Austria) Oliver Filip
- (Austria) Sandi Lovrić
- (Belgium) Rubin Seigers
- (Croatia) Matko Babić
- (Croatia) Adrian Blečić
- (Croatia) Davor Lovren
- (Croatia) Karlo Majić
- (Croatia) Nikola Moro
- (Czech Republic) Ondřej Lingr
- (France) Bilal Boutobba
- (France) Mamadou Doucouré
- (France) Jordan Rambaud
- (Germany) Johannes Eggestein
- (Germany) Görkem Sağlam
- (Germany) Niklas Schmidt
- (Germany) Janni Serra
- (Greece) Kostas Kirtzialidis
- (Italy) Patrick Cutrone
- (Italy) Simone Lo Faso
- (Italy) Simone Mazzocchi
- (Netherlands) Reda Boultam
- (Russia) Aleksei Tatayev
- (Spain) Carles Aleñá
- (Spain) Francisco José Villalba
- (Spain) José Luis Zalazar

Own goal

- (Germany) Gökhan Gül (playing against France)
- (Italy) Federico Giraudo (playing against the Netherlands)
- (Netherlands) Timothy Fosu-Mensah (playing against England)

Source: UEFA

== Team of the tournament ==
Goalkeepers

- (Belgium) Jens Teunckens
- (Germany) Constantin Frommann

Defenders

- (France) Alec Georgen
- (Croatia) Borna Sosa
- (Spain) Marc Cucurella
- (Belgium) Wout Faes
- (France) Dayot Upamecano

Midfielders

- (Spain) Carles Aleñá
- (Croatia) Josip Brekalo
- (France) Timothé Cognat
- (Russia) Georgi Makhatadze
- (Croatia) Nikola Moro
- (England) Marcus Edwards

Forwards

- (Germany) Felix Passlack
- (France) Odsonne Édouard
- (France) Jonathan Ikoné
- (England) Chris Willock
- (France) Jeff Reine-Adélaïde

Source: UEFA Technical Report
