= Dennis Van Vaerenbergh =

Belgian footballer (born 1998)

Personal information
- Full name: Dennis Eric Jan Van Vaerenbergh
- Date of birth: 26 June 1998 (age 28)
- Place of birth: Asse, Belgium
- Height: 1.88 m (6 ft 2 in)
- Position: Forward

Team information
- Current team: Mandel United
- Number: 9

Youth career
- –2017: Club Brugge

Senior career*
Years	Team	Apps	(Gls)
2017–2018	Club Brugge	0	(0)
2017–2018	→ FC Eindhoven (loan)	8	(1)
2018–2020	Dender EH	39	(4)
2020–2021	Tienen	3	(0)
2021–2022	Lokeren-Temse	15	(1)
2022–2024	SC Dikkelvenne	67	(43)
2024–2025	Ninove	6	(1)
2025–	Mandel United	10	(1)

International career
2013	Belgium U15	5	(1)
2013–2014	Belgium U16	8	(4)
2013–2015	Belgium U17	23	(9)
2016	Belgium U18	1	(0)
2016–2017	Belgium U19	5	(2)
- * Club domestic league appearances and goals as of 13:03, 21 January 2026 (UTC)

Dennis Eric Jan Van Vaerenbergh (born 26 June 1998) is a Belgian footballer who plays as a forward for Belgian club RFC Mandel United.

== Club career ==
He made his Eerste Divisie debut for FC Eindhoven on 15 September 2017 in a game against RKC Waalwijk.

== International career ==
He played for Belgium national under-17 team at the 2015 UEFA European Under-17 Championship and 2015 FIFA U-17 World Cup.
