= Veľký Biel =

Veľký Biel Magyarbél
- Municipality
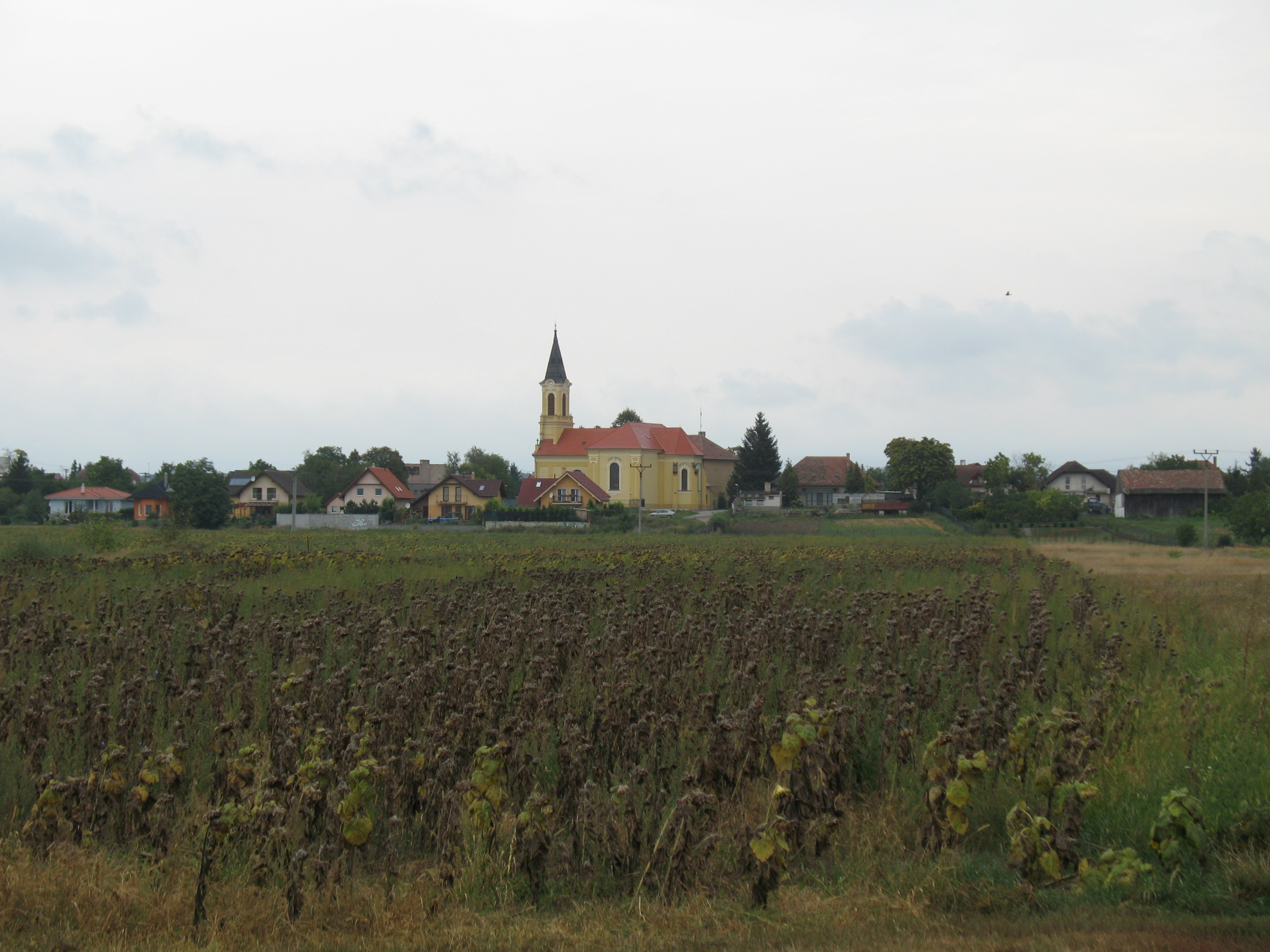

- Flag

- Location of Veľký Biel in the Bratislava Region Location of Veľký Biel in Slovakia
- Coordinates: 48.21°N 17.36°E
- Country: Slovakia
- Region: Bratislava Region
- District: Senec District
- First mentioned: 1209

Government
  - Mayor: Anton Danter

Area
  - Total: 10.16 km^{2} (3.92 sq mi)
- Elevation: 126 m (413 ft)

Population (2025)
  - Total: 3,074
- Time zone: UTC+1 (CET)
  - Summer (DST): UTC+2 (CEST)
- Postal code: 900 24
- Area code: +421 24
- Vehicle registration plate (until 2022): SC
- Website: www.velkybiel.eu

Veľký Biel (Hungarian: Magyarbél) is a village and municipality in western Slovakia in Senec District in the Bratislava Region.

== Etymology ==
The name comes from Slavic beľ (bělь): whiteness, "glistening place" - mud, swam (compare i.e. with Old Polish biel or Russian biľ /dialect/). 1294 Beel, 1335 Magyarbel (hu: "Hungarian Bel"), now Veľký Biel. 1323 Minor Beel, 1335 Nemethbel (hu: "German Bel"), now Malý Biel - a part of Veľký Bieľ.

== History ==
In historical records the village was first mentioned in 1209.

== Geography ==
The municipality lies at an altitude of 126 metres (413 ft) and covers an area of 10.16 km^{2} (3.92 sq mi) (2025).

== Population ==
Population statistic (10 years)
Year	1995	2005	2015	2025
Count	2000	2230	2446	3074
Difference		+11.5%	+9.68%	+25.67%

Population statistic
Year	2024	2025
Count	3064	3074
Difference		+0.32%

It has a population of 3074 people (31 December 2025).

=== Ethnicity ===
Census 2021 (1+ %)
Ethnicity	Number	Fraction
Slovak	2261	76%
Hungarian	607	20.4%
Not found out	203	6.82%
Total	2975	

In year 2021 was 2975 people by ethnicity 2261 as Slovak, 607 as Hungarian, 203 as Not found out, 27 as Czech, 9 as German, 9 as Other, 7 as Ukrainian, 6 as Russian, 4 as Romani, 4 as Rusyn, 3 as Polish, 3 as French, 3 as Albanian, 2 as Italian, 2 as Romanian, 2 as Croatian, 2 as English, 1 as Vietnamese, 1 as Serbian, 1 as Greek and 1 as Bulgarian.

Note on population: The difference values of population numbers in the table "Population statistic" and in the sections "Ethnicity" & "Religion" is caused by the use of various statistical methods.

=== Religion ===
Census 2021 (1+ %)
Religion	Number	Fraction
Roman Catholic Church	1638	55.06%
None	894	30.05%
Not found out	204	6.86%
Evangelical Church	99	3.33%
Greek Catholic Church	52	1.75%
Total	2975	

In year 2021 was 2975 people by religion 1638 from Roman Catholic Church, 894 from None, 204 from Not found out, 99 from Evangelical Church, 52 from Greek Catholic Church, 13 from Other, 10 from Eastern Orthodox Church, 9 from Calvinist Church, 9 from Christian Congregations in Slovakia, 7 from Old Catholic Church, 5 from Other and not ascertained christian church, 5 from Islam, 5 from United Methodist Church, 5 from Buddhism, 5 from Baptists Church, 5 from Ad hoc movements, 4 from Apostolic Church, 2 from Jewish community, 2 from Paganism and natural spirituality, 1 from Church of the Brethren and 1 from Church of Jesus Christ of Latter-day Saints.

== External links/Sources ==
Media related to Veľký Biel at Wikimedia Commons

- Official page
- https://web.archive.org/web/20070513023228/http://www.statistics.sk/mosmis/eng/run.html
