= Maxime Pélican =

French footballer (born 1998)

Personal information
- Date of birth: 12 May 1998 (age 28)
- Place of birth: Perpignan, France
- Height: 1.76 m (5 ft 9 in)
- Position: Forward

Team information
- Current team: Canet Roussillon

Youth career
- 2003–2005: Toulouse
- 2005–2006: ASC Las Cobas Perpignan
- 2006–2007: Saleilles OC
- 2007–2013: Perpignan Canet FC
- 2013–2016: Toulouse

Senior career*
Years	Team	Apps	(Gls)
2015–2018	Toulouse B	28	(10)
2018–2019	Nice B	19	(7)
2019	Nice	2	(0)
2019–2021	Gazélec Ajaccio	23	(2)
2021–2022	Moulins Yzeure	26	(13)
2022–2023	Bergerac	13	(0)
2023	Aubagne	14	(2)
2023–2024	Balagne	20	(5)
2024–	Canet Roussillon	9	(1)

International career
2013–2014	France U16	8	(4)
2014–2015	France U17	17	(5)
2015–2016	France U18	5	(3)
2018	France U20	2	(0)
- * Club domestic league appearances and goals as of 23 November 2024

Maxime Pélican (born 12 May 1998) is a French professional footballer who plays as a forward for Championnat National 3 club Canet Roussillon.

== Club career ==
Pélican made his professional debut for Nice in a 1–0 Ligue 1 win against Lyon on 10 February 2019, coming on for Myziane Maolida in the 65th minute.

== Personal life ==
Born in France, is of Catalan descent, with roots from the Cerdanya region.

== Honours ==
France U17

- UEFA European Under-17 Championship: 2015
