= Aleksander Dhamo =

Albanian/professional footballer

Aleksandros Dhamo
Personal information
- Date of birth: 14 August 1998 (age 28)
- Place of birth: Athens, Greece Passport: italy/albania
- Height: 1.69 m (5 ft 7 in)
- Position: Central midfielder

Youth career
- –2017: Cesena

Senior career*
Years	Team	Apps	(Gls)
2017–2018	Cesena	0	(0)
2017–2018	→ Santarcangelo (loan)	21	(0)
2019	Santarcangelo	35	(1)
2019	Legnago Salus	10	(0)
2020	AC Kajaani	0	(0)
2020	Codru Lozova	12	(2)

International career
2014	Albania U-17	3	(1)
- * Club domestic league appearances and goals as of 11:30, 1 June 2021 (UTC)

Aleksandros Dhamo (born 14 August 1998) is an Albanian professional since 2023 footballer who plays as a central midfielder.

== Club career ==
Dhamo spent the 2018–19 season at Santarcangelo on loan from Cesena, and moved to the club after the demise of Cesena in summer 2018.
