= 2003 UEFA European Under-17 Championship squads =

Football tournament squads

Those marked in bold have now been capped at full International level.

== Group A ==
=== Austria ===
Head coach: Ernst Weber

No.	Pos.	Player	Date of birth (age)	Caps	Club
1	GK	Bobby Olejnik	26 November 1986 (aged 16)		(England) Aston Villa
2	DF	**Ronald Gërçaliu**	12 February 1986 (aged 17)		(Austria) Sturm Graz
3	DF	Marco Salvatore	20 February 1986 (aged 17)		Austria Wien
4	DF	**Andreas Dober**	31 March 1986 (aged 17)		(Austria) Rapid Wien
5	DF	Daniel Pirker	2 December 1986 (aged 16)		(Austria) Grazer AK
6	MF	Andreas Schicker	6 July 1986 (aged 16)		Austria Wien
7	MF	Helmut König	13 July 1986 (aged 16)		(Austria) FC Kärnten
8	MF	**Christian Fuchs**	7 April 1986 (aged 17)		(Austria) SV Mattersburg
9	FW	Sascha Pichler	31 January 1986 (aged 17)		Austria Wien
10	MF	Patrick Mayer	11 August 1986 (aged 16)		(Netherlands) Vitesse Arnhem
11	FW	Daniel Horvath-Markovic	19 October 1986 (aged 16)		(Austria) Grazer AK
12	GK	Albin Kajtezovic	7 March 1986 (aged 17)		(Austria) Admira Wacker
13	MF	**Christoph Saurer**	22 January 1986 (aged 17)		Austria Wien
14	FW	**Marko Stanković**	17 February 1986 (aged 17)		(Austria) DSV Leoben
15	DF	**Franz Schiemer**	21 March 1986 (aged 17)		(Austria) SV Ried
16	DF	Martin Frantsich	24 February 1986 (aged 17)		Austria Wien
17	MF	Sandro Samwald	3 June 1986 (aged 16)		(Germany) TSV 1860 München
18	DF	Christian Balga	21 April 1986 (aged 17)		(Austria) St. Pölten

=== Denmark ===
Head coach: Hans Brun Larsen

No.	Pos.	Player	Date of birth (age)	Caps	Club
1	GK	Kenneth Stenild	11 September 1987 (aged 15)		(Denmark) AaB
2	MF	Kasper Kristensen	27 March 1986 (aged 17)		(Denmark) Virum-Sorgenfri BK
3	DF	Anders Bjerring Qvist	31 July 1987 (aged 15)		(Denmark) B.93
4	DF	**Michael Jakobsen**	2 January 1986 (aged 17)		(Denmark) B.93
5	DF	Nicklas Svendsen	11 December 1986 (aged 16)		(Denmark) KB
6	DF	Jakob Rasmussen	10 September 1987 (aged 15)		(Denmark) Odense BK
7	MF	Søren Christensen	29 June 1986 (aged 16)		(Denmark) Lolland-Falster Alliancen
8	FW	Danilo Arrieta	10 February 1987 (aged 16)		(Spain) Valencia
9	FW	Mads Torry	23 May 1986 (aged 16)		(Denmark) KB
10	FW	Lasse Qvist	17 January 1987 (aged 16)		(Denmark) Lyngby BK
11	MF	Bo Storm	3 February 1987 (aged 16)		(Netherlands) Heerenveen
12	MF	Navid Dayyani	17 February 1987 (aged 16)		(Denmark) Aarhus GF
13	DF	Casper Abildgaard	2 September 1986 (aged 16)		(Denmark) Akademisk BK
14	DF	Mathias Gravesen	29 January 1986 (aged 17)		(Denmark) KB
15	FW	Alvaro Diaz Rivera	10 September 1987 (aged 15)		(Denmark) F.C. Copenhagen
16	GK	Michael Tørnes	8 January 1986 (aged 17)		(Denmark) Lyngby BK
17	FW	Frederik Lassen	20 February 1986 (aged 17)		(Denmark) farum BK
18	MF	Marc Olsen	15 January 1986 (aged 17)		(Denmark) Vanløse IF

=== Hungary ===
Head coach: István Varga

No.	Pos.	Player	Date of birth (age)	Caps	Club
1	GK	Szabolcs Kemenes	18 May 1986 (aged 16)		(Hungary) Ferencváros
2	DF	Zoltán Kiss	12 July 1986 (aged 16)		(Hungary) Újpest
3	DF	Balázs Bergmann	18 June 1986 (aged 16)		(Hungary) Újpest
4	MF	Dániel Hauser	22 August 1986 (aged 16)		(Hungary) MTK
5	DF	László Sütő	18 April 1986 (aged 17)		(Hungary) MTK
6	MF	**László Zsidai**	16 July 1986 (aged 16)		(Hungary) MTK
7	MF	László Miskolczi	12 March 1986 (aged 17)		(Hungary) Nyíregyháza Spartacus
8	MF	Tamás Kecskés	15 January 1986 (aged 17)		(Hungary) Pécsi MFC
9	FW	Szilveszter Ágoston	21 January 1986 (aged 17)		(Hungary) Zalaegerszegi TE
10	MF	**Balázs Dzsudzsák**	23 December 1986 (aged 16)		(Hungary) Debreceni VSC
11	MF	István Ladóczki	11 January 1986 (aged 17)		(Hungary) MTK
12	GK	Tamás Kozma	29 November 1986 (aged 16)		(Hungary) MTK
13	DF	Gábor Kovács	4 September 1987 (aged 15)		(Hungary) Ferencváros
14	FW	**Róbert Feczesin**	22 January 1986 (aged 17)		(Hungary) Újpest
15	MF	Gábor Demjén	1 March 1986 (aged 17)		(Hungary) Újpest
16	MF	Gergely Telegdi	12 July 1986 (aged 16)		(Hungary) MTK
17	FW	László Hegyesi	2 January 1986 (aged 17)		(Hungary) MTK
18		Balázs Balogh			

=== Portugal ===
Head coach: António José Batista De Sousa Violante

No.	Pos.	Player	Date of birth (age)	Caps	Club
1	GK	Pedro Freitas	31 August 1986 (aged 16)		(Portugal) Vitória Guimarães
2	DF	João Dias	23 December 1986 (aged 16)		(Portugal) Sporting Braga
3	DF	**Tiago Gomes**	29 July 1986 (aged 16)		(Portugal) Benfica
4	MF	**Miguel Veloso**	11 May 1986 (aged 17)		(Portugal) Sporting CP
5	DF	Tiago Costa	27 October 1986 (aged 16)		(Portugal) FC Porto
6	MF	**Paulo Machado**	31 March 1986 (aged 17)		(Portugal) FC Porto
7	FW	**Vieirinha**	25 January 1986 (aged 17)		(Portugal) Vitória Guimarães
8	FW	**João Moutinho**	8 September 1986 (aged 16)		(Portugal) Sporting CP
9	FW	Carlos Saleiro	25 February 1986 (aged 17)		(Portugal) Sporting CP
10	MF	Márcio Sousa	23 March 1986 (aged 17)		(Portugal) FC Porto
11	FW	**Hélder Barbosa**	25 May 1987 (aged 15)		(Portugal) Académica
12	GK	Mário Felgueiras	12 December 1986 (aged 16)		(Portugal) Sporting CP
13	DF	Vítor Vinha	11 November 1986 (aged 16)		(Portugal) Académica
14	DF	Paulo Ricardo	3 March 1986 (aged 17)		(Portugal) Vitória Guimarães
15	DF	João Pedro	4 May 1986 (aged 17)		(Portugal) Sporting Braga
16	FW	Bruno Gama	15 November 1987 (aged 15)		(Portugal) Sporting Braga
17	MF	João Coimbra	24 May 1986 (aged 16)		(Portugal) Benfica
18	FW	Manuel Curto	9 July 1986 (aged 16)		(Portugal) Benfica

== Group B ==
=== England ===
Head coach:

No.	Pos.	Player	Date of birth (age)	Caps	Club
1	GK	**Tom Heaton**	15 April 1986 (aged 17)		(England) Manchester United
2	DF	Philip Ifil	18 November 1986 (aged 16)		(England) Tottenham Hotspur
3	DF	Stuart Giddings	27 March 1986 (aged 17)		(England) Coventry City
4	MF	**Tom Huddlestone**	28 December 1986 (aged 16)		(England) Derby County
5	DF	Martin Cranie	26 September 1986 (aged 16)		(England) Southampton
6	DF	Steven Taylor	23 January 1986 (aged 17)		(England) Newcastle United
7	MF	**Aaron Lennon**	16 April 1987 (aged 16)		(England) Leeds United
8	MF	Grant Leadbitter	7 January 1986 (aged 17)		(England) Sunderland
9	FW	Luke Moore	13 February 1986 (aged 17)		(England) Aston Villa
10	MF	**James Morrison**	25 May 1986 (aged 16)		(England) Middlesbrough
11	FW	Dean Bowditch	15 June 1986 (aged 16)		(England) Ipswich Town
12	DF	Anthony McMahon	24 March 1986 (aged 17)		(England) Middlesbrough
13	GK	David Martin	22 January 1986 (aged 17)		(England) Milton Keynes Dons
14	DF	Nathan Doyle	12 January 1987 (aged 16)		(England) Derby County
15	FW	Ryan Jarvis	11 July 1986 (aged 16)		(England) Norwich City
16	MF	**James Milner**	4 January 1986 (aged 17)		(England) Leeds United
17	FW	**Jonathan Forte**	25 July 1986 (aged 16)		(England) Sheffield United
18	MF	Andrew Taylor	1 August 1986 (aged 16)		(England) Middlesbrough

=== Israel ===
Head coach: Avraham Bakhar

No.	Pos.	Player	Date of birth (age)	Caps	Club
1	GK	**Guy Haimov**	9 March 1986 (aged 17)		(Israel) Maccabi Tel Aviv
2	DF	Yogev Ben Simon	6 April 1986 (aged 17)		(Israel) Hapoel Ironi Rishon LeZion
3	DF	Ori Shitrit	21 January 1986 (aged 17)		(Israel) Maccabi Tel Aviv
4	DF	Mor Maman	2 February 1986 (aged 17)		(Israel) Maccabi Haifa
5	DF	Lior Jan	21 August 1986 (aged 16)		(Israel) Maccabi Tel Aviv
6	DF	**Shai Maimon**	18 March 1986 (aged 17)		(Israel) Maccabi Haifa
7	MF	Ami Gilbert	27 February 1986 (aged 17)		(Israel) Hapoel Haifa
8	MF	Yakir Lusky	18 March 1986 (aged 17)		(Israel) Hapoel Tel Aviv
9	FW	Omer Peretz	21 June 1986 (aged 16)		(France) RC Strasbourg
10	FW	Elnatan Salami	15 April 1986 (aged 17)		(Israel) Hapoel Petah Tikva
11	MF	**Lior Refaelov**	26 April 1986 (aged 17)		(Israel) Maccabi Haifa
12	MF	Messay Dego	15 February 1986 (aged 17)		(Israel) Hapoel Tel Aviv
13	MF	Yaniv Ifergan	5 June 1986 (aged 16)		(Israel) Hapoel Be'er Sheva
14	MF	Michael Warwick	21 February 1986 (aged 17)		(England) Stoke City
15	DF	Yonatan Kim	29 October 1986 (aged 16)		(Israel) Beitar Jerusalem
16	FW	**Eden Ben Basat**	8 September 1986 (aged 16)		(Israel) Maccabi Haifa
17	FW	Shlomi Hachamov	15 March 1986 (aged 17)		(Israel) Bnei Yehuda Tel Aviv
18	GK	Gil Ofek	19 January 1986 (aged 17)		(Israel) Maccabi Haifa

=== Italy ===
Head coach: Antonio Rocca

No.	Pos.	Player	Date of birth (age)	Caps	Goals	Club
1	GK	Fabio Virgili	26 April 1986 (aged 17)	11	0	(Italian Football Federation) Parma
2	DF	**Marco Motta**	14 May 1986 (aged 16)			(Italian Football Federation) Atalanta
3	DF	**Domenico Criscito**	30 December 1986 (aged 16)			(Italian Football Federation) Genoa
4	DF	Marco Andreolli	10 June 1986 (aged 16)			(Italian Football Federation) Padova
5	DF	Lino Marzorati	12 October 1986 (aged 16)			(Italian Football Federation) A.C. Milan
6	MF	Andrea Stucchi	27 April 1986 (aged 17)			(Italian Football Federation) Atalanta
7	MF	Davide Bottone	11 April 1986 (aged 17)			(Italian Football Federation) Torino
8	MF	Andrea Bovo	14 May 1986 (aged 16)			(Italian Football Federation) Venezia
9	FW	Michele Paolucci	6 February 1986 (aged 17)			(Italian Football Federation) Juventus
10	MF	Piermario Morosini	5 July 1986 (aged 16)			(Italian Football Federation) Atalanta
11	FW	Nicola Pozzi	30 June 1986 (aged 16)			(Italian Football Federation) Cesena
12	GK	Giacomo Bindi	2 January 1987 (aged 16)	0	0	(Italian Football Federation) Arezzo
13	DF	Davide Bagarollo	12 March 1986 (aged 17)			(Italian Football Federation) Padova
14	DF	Simone Vitale	1 March 1986 (aged 17)	0	0	(Italian Football Federation) Pescara
15	MF	Leonardo Formichetti	8 January 1986 (aged 17)	0	0	(Italian Football Federation) Lazio
16	FW	Arturo Lupoli	24 June 1987 (aged 15)	0	0	(Italian Football Federation) Parma
17	FW	Niccolò Morsia	22 January 1986 (aged 17)	0	0	(Italian Football Federation) Parma
18	FW	**Giuseppe Rossi**	1 February 1987 (aged 16)	3	0	(Italian Football Federation) Parma

=== Spain ===
Head coach: Juan Santisteban

No.	Pos.	Player	Date of birth (age)	Caps	Club
1	GK	Roberto Jiménez	10 February 1986 (aged 17)		(Spain) Atlético Madrid
2	DF	Manuel Ruz	5 April 1986 (aged 17)		(Spain) Valencia
3	DF	Raúl Llorente	2 April 1986 (aged 17)		(Spain) Atlético Madrid
4	DF	Marcos Martín	4 February 1986 (aged 17)		(Spain) Atlético Madrid
5	DF	Sergio Sánchez	3 April 1986 (aged 17)		(Spain) Espanyol
6	DF	Marcos Tébar	7 February 1986 (aged 17)		(Spain) Real Madrid
7	MF	Sisi	22 April 1986 (aged 17)		(Spain) Valencia
8	MF	Markel Bergara	5 May 1986 (aged 17)		(Spain) Real Sociedad
9	FW	David Rodríguez	14 February 1986 (aged 17)		(Spain) Atlético Madrid
10	MF	**David Silva**	8 January 1986 (aged 17)		(Spain) Valencia
11	MF	José Manuel Jurado	29 June 1986 (aged 16)		(Spain) Real Madrid
12	FW	Manu García	26 April 1986 (aged 17)		(Spain) Real Sociedad
13	GK	Antonio Adán	13 May 1987 (aged 15)		(Spain) Real Madrid
14	DF	César Arzo	21 January 1986 (aged 17)		(Spain) Villarreal
15	MF	Eneko Urien	15 February 1986 (aged 17)		(Spain) Athletic Bilbao
16	MF	José María Cases	23 November 1986 (aged 16)		(Spain) Villarreal
17	DF	César Collado	19 September 1986 (aged 16)		(Spain) Mallorca
18	FW	Xisco Nadal	27 June 1986 (aged 16)		(Spain) Villarreal
