= 2003 UEFA European Under-17 Championship =

2003 UEFA Under-17 Championship
Campeonato Europeu de Futebol Sub-17 de 2003

Tournament details
- Host country: Portugal
- Dates: 7–17 May
- Teams: 8

Final positions
- Champions: Portugal (5th title)
- Runners-up: Spain
- Third place: Austria
- Fourth place: England

Tournament statistics
- Matches played: 16
- Goals scored: 44 (2.75 per match)
- Top scorer: (Spain) David Rodríguez (6 goals)
- Best player: (Portugal) Miguel Veloso

The 2003 UEFA European Under-17 Championship was the second edition of UEFA's UEFA European Under-17 Championship. Portugal hosted the championship, during 7–17 May. The format of the competition changed, and only 8 teams entered the competition. Host Portugal defeated Spain in the final to win the competition for the fifth time.

For winning their semifinals, Portugal and Spain qualified for the 2003 FIFA U-17 World Championship, held in Finland, with England and Austria missing out.

== Qualification ==
Qualification for the final tournament of the 2003 UEFA European Under-17 Championship consisted of two rounds: a Qualifying round and an Elite round. In the qualifying round, 44 national teams competed in 11 groups of four teams, with two best teams of each group advancing to the elite round. There, the 22 first-round qualifiers plus the teams who were given a bye (Spain, England, Russia, Finland, Poland and Hungary), were distributed in seven groups of four teams. The winner of each group qualified for the final tournament.

=== Qualified teams ===
The following 8 teams qualified for the final tournament.

Note: All appearance statistics include only U-17 era (since 2002).

Country	Qualified as	Previous appearances in tournament
Portugal	Hosts	1 (2002)
Spain	Group 1 winner	1 (2002)
Denmark	Group 2 winner	1 (2002)
Austria	Group 3 winner	0 (debut)
Israel	Group 4 winner	0 (debut)
Hungary	Group 5 winner	1 (2002)
England	Group 6 winner	1 (2002)
Italy	Group 7 winner	0 (debut)

== Venues ==
The final tournament was played in seven venues located in seven different cities, Viseu, Nelas, Chaves, Mangualde, Vila Real, Santa Comba Dão and Santa Marta de Penaguião. The Estádio do Fontelo was the largest stadium with a tournament capacity of 12,000 seats, and served as both the opening ceremony and the final venue.

The table below lists stadium capacity for the final tournament, which may not correspond to their effective maximum capacity.

2003 UEFA European Under-17 Championship is located in Portugal	Viseu	Chaves
2003 UEFA European Under-17 Championship is located in Portugal	Estádio do Fontelo	Estádio Municipal Eng. Manuel Branco Teixeira
2003 UEFA European Under-17 Championship is located in Portugal	Capacity: 12,000	Capacity: 12,000
2003 UEFA European Under-17 Championship is located in Portugal	Santa Comba Dão	Nelas
2003 UEFA European Under-17 Championship is located in Portugal	Estádio Municipal Doutor Orlando Mendes	Estádio Municipal de Nelas
2003 UEFA European Under-17 Championship is located in Portugal	Capacity: 10,000	Capacity: 7,500
Vila Real	Mangualde	Santa Marta de Penaguião
Complexo Desportivo Monte da Forca	Estádio Municipal de Mangualde	Municipal de Santa Marta de Penaguião
Capacity: 6,000	Capacity: 1,500	Capacity: 500

== Squads ==
Each participating national association had to submit a final list of 18 players (three of whom must be goalkeepers). All players must have been born on or after 1 January 1986.

== Match Officials ==
A total of 6 referees, 8 assistant referees and 2 fourth officials were appointed for the final tournament.

Referees

- (Slovenia) Damir Skomina
- (Ukraine) Sergiy Berezka
- (Moldova) Veaceslav Banari
- (Sweden) Stefan Johannesson
- (Poland) Novo Panic
- (Turkey) Kuddusi Müftüoglu

Assistant referees

- (Northern Ireland) David Paul Todd
- (Switzerland) Gianpietro Lucca
- (Greece) Dimitrios Bozatzidis
- (Malta) Ingmar Spiteri
- (Slovakia) Roman Slysko
- (Croatia) Tomislav Petrovic
- (Netherlands) Arie Brink
- (Russia) Tihon Kalugin

Fourth officials

- (Portugal) Pedro Proenca Oliveira Alves Garcia
- (Portugal) Joaquim Paulo Paraty Da Silva

== Group stage ==
=== Group A ===
Teams	GP	W	D	L	GF	GA	GD	Pts	Status
Portugal	3	3	0	0	6	2	4	9	Advanced to the semifinals
Austria	3	2	0	1	3	1	2	6	Advanced to the semifinals
Denmark	3	1	0	2	4	5	−1	3	
Hungary	3	0	0	3	0	5	−5	0	

7 May 2003
16:00 CET

Portugal	3–2	Denmark
João Pedro 34'; Paulo Ricardo 40'; Curto 55'	Report	Torry 32', 42'

Estádio do Fontelo, Viseu
Referee: Damir Skomina (Slovenia)
7 May 2003
18:00 CET

Austria	1–0	Hungary
Saurer 78'	Report

Estádio Municipal de Nelas, Nelas
Referee: Sergiy Berezka (Ukraine)

9 May 2003
16:00 CET

Portugal	1–0	Austria
Curto 14'	Report

Santa Comba Dão
Referee: Kuddusi Müftüoglu (Turkey)
9 May 2003
18:00 CET

Denmark	2–0	Hungary
Storm 33'; Jakobsen 50'	Report

Estádio Municipal de Mangualde, Mangualde
Referee: Novo Panic (Bosnia and Herzegovina)

11 May 2003
17:30 CET

Hungary	0–2	Portugal
	Report	Bruno Gama 50'; Vieirinha 62'

Estádio do Fontelo, Viseu
Referee: Stefan Johannesson (Sweden)
11 May 2003
17:30 CET

Denmark	0–2	Austria
	Report	Mayer 42'; Horvath 83'

Estádio Municipal de Nelas, Nelas
Referee: Veaceslav Banari (Moldova)

=== Group B ===
Teams	GP	W	D	L	GF	GA	GD	Pts	Status
Spain	3	2	1	0	7	2	5	7	Advanced to the semifinals
England	3	1	2	0	4	3	1	5	Advanced to the semifinals
Italy	3	1	1	1	4	2	2	4	
Israel	3	0	0	3	1	9	−8	0	

7 May 2003
16:00 CET

Israel	1–2	England
Rafaelov 47' (pen.)	Report	Bowditch 51'; Milner 54'

Municipal de Santa Marta de Penaguião, Santa Marta de Penaguião
Referee: Novo Panic (Bosnia and Herzegovina)
7 May 2003
18:00 CET

Spain	2–0	Italy
Cases 28'; Nadal 35'	Report

Complexo Desportivo Monte da Forca, Vila Real
Referee: Kuddusi Müftüoglu (Turkey)

9 May 2003
15:30 CET

Israel	0–3	Spain
	Report	Silva 33'; David 36'; Cases 47'

Estádio Municipal Eng. Manuel Branco Teixeira, Chaves
Referee: Veaceslav Banari (Moldova)
9 May 2003
18:00 CET

England	0–0	Italy
	Report

Estádio Municipal Eng. Manuel Branco Teixeira, Chaves
Referee: Stefan Johannesson (Sweden)

11 May 2003
17:30 CET

England	2–2	Spain
Taylor 47'; Milner 51'	Report	Nadal 9'; Jurado 27'

Complexo Desportivo Monte da Forca, Vila Real
Referee: Sergiy Berezka (Ukraine)
11 May 2003
17:30 CET

Italy	4–0	Israel
Pozzi 32', 46'; Lupoli 35', 78'	Report

Municipal de Santa Marta de Penaguião, Santa Marta de Penaguião
Referee: Damir Skomina (Slovenia)

== Knockout stage ==
=== Knockout map ===
Semi-finals
14 May – Viseu
Portugal (p)	2 (3)
England	2 (2)
14 May – Mangualde
Spain	5
Austria	2

Final
17 May – Viseu
Portugal	2
Spain	1
Third place
17 May – Santa Comba Dão
England	0
Austria	1

=== Semifinals ===
14 May 2003
18:00 CET

Portugal	2–2	England
Vieirinha 10'; Saleiro 82'	Report	Bowditch 8'; Milner 21'
Penalties
Machado (penalty scored); Vieirinha (penalty scored); Saleiro (penalty scored); Gama (penalty missed)	3–2	(penalty missed) Doyle; (penalty missed) Moore; (penalty scored) Milner; (penalty scored) Ifil; (penalty missed) Leadbitter

Estádio do Fontelo, Viseu
Referee: Damir Skomina (Slovenia)

14 May 2003
16:00 CET

Spain	5–2	Austria
David 4', 12', 37', 68'; Cases 16'	Report	Fuchs 59'; Stankovic 62'

Estádio Municipal de Mangualde, Mangualde
Referee: Stefan Johannesson (Sweden)

=== Third Place Playoff ===
17 May 2003
15:30 CET

England	0–1	Austria
	Report	Pirker 53'

Estádio Municipal Doutor Orlando Mendes, Santa Comba Dão
Referee: Sergiy Berezka (Ukraine)

=== Final ===
17 May 2003
18:30 CET

Portugal	2–1	Spain
Márcio Sousa 22', 47'	Report	David 42'

Estádio do Fontelo, Viseu
Referee: Novo Panic (Bosnia and Herzegovina)

Portugal	Spain

GK	12	Mário Felgueiras
RB	2	João Dias	(yellow card) 60'
CB	4	Miguel Veloso (c)
CB	14	Paulo Ricardo
LB	3	Tiago Gomes
CM	6	Paulo Machado
CM	17	João Coimbra		(substituted off) 70'
MO	10	Márcio Sousa		(substituted off) 77'
RW	7	Vieirinha
LW	15	João Pedro		(substituted off) 52'
CF	9	Carlos Saleiro
Substitutions:
GK	1	Pedro Freitas
LB	13	Vítor Vinha
CB	5	Tiago Costa
MF	8	João Moutinho		(substituted on) 77'
LW	11	Hélder Barbosa
RW	16	Bruno Gama		(substituted on) 52'
FW	18	Manuel Curto		(substituted on) 70'
Manager:
António Violante

GK	13	Antonio Adán
RB	2	Manuel Ruz		(substituted off) 72'
CB	5	Sergio Sánchez
CB	14	César Arzo	(yellow card) 81'
LB	3	Raúl Llorente
DM	8	Markel Bergara		(substituted off) 63'
MF	16	José Cases		(substituted off) 49'
MF	11	Jurado (c)
MF	10	David Silva
LW	7	Sisi
CF	9	David Rodríguez
Substitutions:
GK	1	Roberto Jiménez
DF	4	Marcos Martín
DF	17	César Collado		(substituted on) 72'
MF	6	Marcos Tébar		(substituted on) 49'
MF	15	Eneko Urien
FW	12	Manu Alejandro
FW	18	Xisco Nadal		(substituted on) 63'
Manager:
Juan Santisteban

== Goalscorers ==
6 goals

- (Spain) David Rodríguez

3 goals

- (England) James Milner
- (Spain) José Cases

2 goals

- (Denmark) Mads Torry
- (England) Dean Bowditch
- (Italy) Arturo Lupoli
- (Italy) Nicola Pozzi
- (Portugal) Manuel Curto
- (Portugal) Márcio Sousa
- (Portugal) Vieirinha
- (Spain) Xisco Nadal

1 goal

- (Austria) Christian Fuchs
- (Austria) Daniel Horvath
- (Austria) Patrick Mayer
- (Austria) Daniel Pirker
- (Austria) Christoph Saurer
- (Austria) Marko Stanković
- (Denmark) Michael Jakobsen
- (Denmark) Bo Storm
- (England) Steven Taylor
- (Israel) Lior Refaelov
- (Portugal) Bruno Gama
- (Portugal) João Pedro
- (Portugal) Paulo Machado
- (Portugal) Carlos Saleiro
- (Spain) Jurado
- (Spain) David Silva
