= Swedish alphabet =

Latin alphabet of the Swedish language

The Swedish alphabet (Swedish: svenska alfabetet) is a basic element of the Latin writing system, used for the Swedish language, and consisting of the modern 26-letter basic Latin alphabet (⟨a⟩ to ⟨z⟩) plus ⟨å⟩, ⟨ä⟩, and ⟨ö⟩, in that order. It contains 20 consonants and 9 vowels (⟨a e i o u y å ä ö⟩). The Latin alphabet was brought to Sweden along with the Christianization of the population, although runes continued in use throughout the first centuries of Christianity, even for ecclesiastic purposes, despite their traditional relation to the Old Norse religion. The runes underwent partial "latinization" in the Middle Ages, when the Latin alphabet was completely accepted as the Swedish script system, but runes still occurred, especially in the countryside, until the 18th century, and were used decoratively until mid 19th century.

== Letters ==
The pronunciation of the names of the letters (that does not necessarily coincide with the sounds the letters represent) is as follows:

Letter		Name
A	a	[ɑː]
B	b	[beː]
C	c	[seː]
D	d	[deː]
E	e	[eː]
F	f	[ɛfː]
G	g	[ɡeː]
H	h	[hoː]
I	i	[iː]
J	j	[jiː]
K	k	[koː]
L	l	[ɛlː]
M	m	[ɛmː]
N	n	[ɛnː]
O	o	[uː]
P	p	[peː]
Q	q	[kʉː]
R	r	[ærː]
S	s	[ɛsː]
T	t	[teː]
U	u	[ʉː]
V	v	[veː]
W	w	[ˈdɵ̂bːɛlˌveː]
X	x	[ɛks]
Y	y	[yː]
Z	z	[ˈsɛ̂ːta]
Å	å	[oː]
Ä	ä	[ɛː]
Ö	ö	[øː]

=== Å, Ä and Ö ===
In addition to the 26 letters of the ISO basic Latin alphabet, A through Z, the Swedish alphabet includes Å, Ä, and Ö at the end. They are distinct letters in Swedish and are sorted after ⟨z⟩.

=== Uncommon letters ===
The letters ⟨q⟩ and ⟨w⟩ are the two least used letters in Swedish.

⟨q⟩ was common in ordinary words before 1889, when its replacement by ⟨k⟩ was allowed. Since 1900, only the forms with ⟨k⟩ are listed in dictionaries. Some proper names kept their ⟨q⟩ despite the change to common words: Qvist, Quist, Husqvarna, Quenby, Quinby, Quintus, Quirin and Quirinus. Other uses include some loanwords that retained ⟨q⟩, including queer, quisling, squash, and quilting; student terms such as gasque; and foreign geographic names like Qatar.

⟨w⟩ was, before the 19th century, interchangeable with ⟨v⟩ (⟨w⟩ was used in Fraktur, ⟨v⟩ in Antiqua). Official orthographic standards since 1801 use only ⟨v⟩ for common words. Many family names kept their ⟨w⟩ despite the change to common words. Foreign words and names bring in uses of ⟨w⟩, particularly combinations with webb for (World Wide) Web. Swedish sorting traditionally and officially treated ⟨v⟩ and ⟨w⟩ as equivalent, so that users would not have to guess whether the word, or name, they were seeking was spelled with a ⟨v⟩ or a ⟨w⟩. The two letters were normally combined in the collating sequence as if they were all ⟨v⟩ or all ⟨w⟩, until 2006 when the 13th edition of Svenska Akademiens ordlista (The Swedish Academy's Orthographic Dictionary) declared a change. ⟨w⟩ was given its own section in the dictionary, and the ⟨w⟩ = ⟨v⟩ sorting rule was officially abolished, although the Language Council of Sweden has considered that this sorting rule, however, still should be used in some contexts, as both of those two letters are pronounced [v] and therefore are difficult to distinguish (in spoken language – mainly in names that may be spelled either with ⟨v⟩ or ⟨w⟩). (This means Swedish books printed before 2006 would group ⟨w⟩ with ⟨v⟩ in the index, and most Swedish software published before 2006 would treat the two as variations of a single character when sorting text.)

The letter ⟨z⟩ is rare, used in names and a few loanwords such as zon "zone". ⟨z⟩ historically represented /ts/. By 1700, this had merged with /s/. As a result, ⟨z⟩ was replaced by ⟨s⟩ in 1700. ⟨z⟩ was instead used in loanwords for historical /z/. ⟨z⟩ is the second least used letter in Swedish, before ⟨q⟩.

=== Foreign letters ===
The characters ⟨à⟩ (which is used only in a few rare non-integrated loanwords such as à, from French) and ⟨é⟩ (used in some integrated loanwords like idé and armé, and in some surnames such as Rosén or Löfvén) are recognised but regarded as variants of ⟨a⟩ and ⟨e⟩, respectively.

The umlauted ⟨ü⟩ is recognised but is only used in names of German origin, and in German loanwords such as müsli. It is otherwise treated as a variant of ⟨y⟩ and is called "German ⟨y⟩".

For foreign names, ⟨ç, ë, í, õ⟩ and many others might be used, but are usually converted to ⟨c, e, i, o⟩, etc.

The letters ⟨æ⟩ and ⟨ø⟩, used in Danish and Norwegian, are considered variants of ⟨ä⟩ and ⟨ö⟩, and are collated as such. Unlike letters with diacritics like ⟨à⟩, ⟨ë⟩, ⟨í⟩, etc. ⟨æ⟩ and ⟨ø⟩ are not easily available on Swedish keyboards, and are thus often replaced with ⟨ä⟩ and ⟨ö⟩. The news agency TT follows this usage because some newspapers have no technical support for ⟨æ⟩ and ⟨ø⟩, although there is a recommendation to use ⟨æ⟩ and ⟨ø⟩. The letter ⟨æ⟩ was used in earlier Swedish script systems, when there was in general more similarity between the Scandinavian languages.

The ligature ⟨æ⟩, used in Latin as a variant of ⟨ae⟩, is used in some Swedish surnames. It is then considered equivalent with ⟨ae⟩ and collated accordingly. However, sometimes it is collated as ⟨ä⟩: in the 14th edition of the Svenska Akademiens ordlista, the words læstadian, læstadianer, læstadianism (from the surname Læstadius) are sorted between lästa and lästeknik.

=== Handwritten cursive alphabet ===
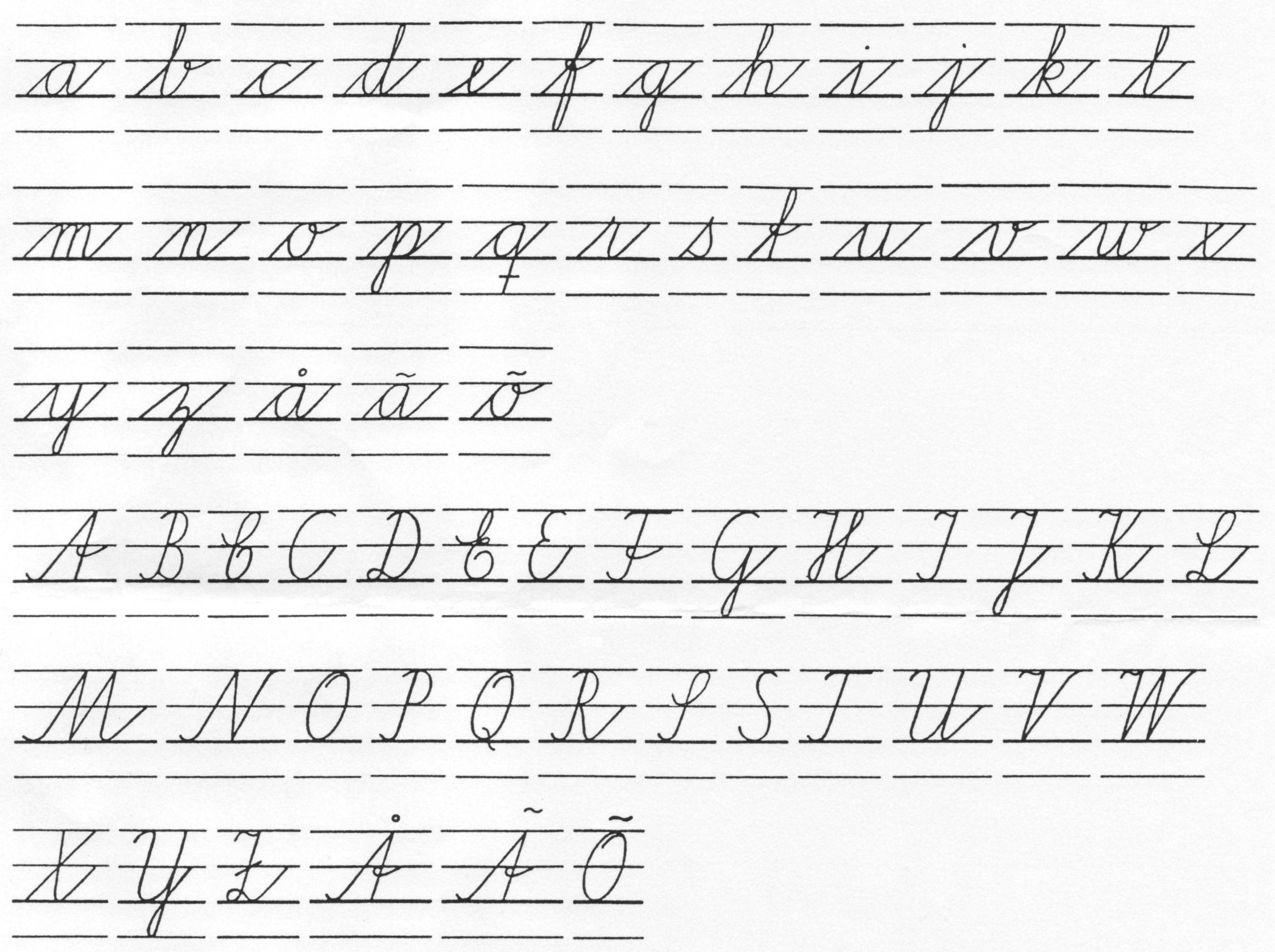
Swedish handwritten alphabet

The Swedish traditional handwritten alphabet is the same as the ordinary Latin cursive alphabet, but the letters ⟨ö⟩ and ⟨ä⟩ are written by connecting the dots with a curved line, identical to a tilde ⟨◌̃⟩, hence looking like ⟨õ⟩ and ⟨ã⟩. In text the dots should be clearly separated, but in handwriting writers frequently replace them with a macron ⟨◌̄⟩: ⟨ō⟩, ⟨ā⟩.

== Sound–spelling correspondences ==
Vowels
Letter	Pronunciation (IPA)		Notes
Letter	Long	Short	Notes
a	/ɑː/	/a/	
e	/eː/	/ɛ/	Some speakers distinguish two short sounds: /ɛ/ and /e/. The former sound is usually spelled ⟨ä⟩, but some words exceptionally have ⟨e⟩, among them words with ⟨ej⟩, numerals, proper names and their derivations, and loanwords. Before 1889, ⟨e⟩ for /ɛ/ and /ɛː/ was also used for many other words, in particular words with ⟨je⟩ now spelled ⟨jä⟩. The sound /eː/ at the end of loanwords and in the last syllable of Swedish surnames is represented by ⟨é⟩.
i	/iː/	/ɪ/	
o	/uː/, /oː/	/ɔ/, /ʊ/	The phoneme /ʊ/ is relatively infrequent; short ⟨o⟩ more often represents /ɔ/. Long ⟨o⟩ usually represents /uː/ in native words.
u	/ʉː/	/ɵ/	
y	/yː/	/ʏ/	
å	/oː/	/ɔ/	Most words with /ɔ/ and some words with /oː/ are spelled with ⟨o⟩.
ä	/ɛː/	/ɛ/	Some words with /ɛ/ are spelled with ⟨e⟩.
ö	/øː/	/œ/	The short ⟨ö⟩ is, in some dialects, pronounced as /ɵ/.

Short vowels are followed by two or more consonants; long vowels are followed by a single consonant, by a vowel or are word-final.

Consonants
Grapheme	Sound (IPA)	Notes
b	/b/	
c	/k/, /s/	/s/ before front vowels ⟨e i y⟩ (not used before ⟨ä ö⟩), otherwise /k/ (not used before ⟨å⟩). The letter ⟨c⟩ alone is used only in loanwords (usually in the /s/ value) and proper names, but ⟨ck⟩ is a normal representation for /kː/ after a short vowel (as in English and German).
ch	/ɧ/, /ɕ/	In loanwords. The conjunction och (and) is pronounced /ɔkː/ or /ɔ/.
d	/d/	
dj	/j/	
f	/f/	
g	/ɡ/, /j/	/j/ before front vowels ⟨e i y ä ö⟩, otherwise /ɡ/
gj	/j/	
gn	/ɡn/, /ŋn/	/ɡn/ word-initially; /ŋn/ elsewhere
h	/h/	
hj	/j/	
j	/j/	
k	/k/, /ɕ/	/ɕ/ before front vowels ⟨e i y ä ö⟩ except for kör and some loanwords, otherwise /k/
kj	/ɕ/	
l	/l/	
lj	/j/	
m	/m/	
n	/n/	
ng	/ŋ/, /ŋɡ/, /ng/	
p	/p/	
r	/r/	Is pronounced as [ɾ] in some words. Considerable dialectal variation, pronounced in Stockholm/Svealand as an approximant [ɹ] or fricative [ʐ]. Southern dialects are noted for their uvular realization of /r/; that is, a uvular trill [ʀ], a fricative [ʁ] or [χ], or an approximant [ʁ̞].
rd	/ɖ/	
rl	/ɭ/	
rn	/ɳ/	
rs	/ʂ/	
rt	/ʈ/	
s	/s/	
sj	/ɧ/	
sk	/sk/, /ɧ/	/ɧ/ before front vowels ⟨e i y ä ö⟩ and in the words människa and marskalk, otherwise /sk/
skj	/ɧ/	
stj	/ɧ/	
t	/t/	
tj	/ɕ/	
v	/v/	Before 1906, ⟨fv, hv⟩ and final ⟨f⟩ were also used for /v/. Now these spellings are used in some proper names.
w	/v/	Rarely used (loanwords, proper names). In loanwords from English, may represent /w/.
x	/ks/	
z	/s/	Only used in loanwords and proper names.

=== Spellings for the ⟨sje⟩-phoneme /ɧ/ ===
Due to several phonetic combinations coalescing over recent centuries, the spelling of the Swedish sje-sound is very eclectic. Some estimates claim that there are over 50 possible different spellings of the sound, though this figure is disputed. Garlén (1988) gives a list of 22 spellings (⟨ch⟩, ⟨che⟩, ⟨g⟩, ⟨ge⟩, ⟨gi⟩, ⟨ige⟩, ⟨j⟩, ⟨je⟩, ⟨sc⟩, ⟨sch⟩, ⟨sh⟩, ⟨shi⟩, ⟨si⟩, ⟨sj⟩, ⟨sk⟩, ⟨skj⟩, ⟨ssi⟩, ⟨ssj⟩, ⟨stg⟩, ⟨sti⟩, ⟨stj⟩, ⟨ti⟩), but many of them are confined to only a few words, often loanwords, and all of them can correspond to other sounds or sound sequences as well. Some spellings of the sje-sound are as follows:

- ⟨ch⟩ in most French loanwords, but in final position often respelled ⟨sch⟩. English loanwords with this spelling usually use the tje-sound
- ⟨g⟩ in words mainly from French, for example generös (generous) and gentil (generous, posh, stylish)
- ⟨ge⟩ mostly in the end of the word in many French loanwords, like garage, prestige
- ⟨gi⟩ in for example religiös (religious)
- ⟨j⟩ in French loanwords, e.g. jalusi (jalousie window)
- ⟨sc⟩ in fascinera (fascinate)
- ⟨sch⟩ in all positions in many German loanwords, like schack ("chess")
- ⟨sh⟩ in all positions in many English loanwords
- ⟨sj⟩ in many native Swedish words
- ⟨sk⟩ in native Swedish words before the front vowels ⟨e, i, y, ä, ö⟩
- ⟨skj⟩ in five words only, four of which are enumerated in the phrase I bara skjortan skjuter han skjutsen in i skjulet (In just his shirt he pushes the vehicle into the shed). The fifth word is skjuva (shear). It is also used in an old word skjura (Eurasian magpie) and dialectic derivations of the same
- ⟨ssj⟩ in four words only: hyssja, hässja, ryssja, ässja
- ⟨stg⟩ in three words only: västgöte, östgöte, gästgiveri. These are not common and are often pronounced as /stj/. All of them are compound words: väst+göte (person from Västergötland) öst+göte (person from Östergötland) and gäst+giveri (inn)
- ⟨sti⟩ occurs only in the words digestion, indigestion, kongestion, suggestion, the place-name Kristianstad, and in the pronunciation of the name Christian when used about Danish kings
- ⟨stj⟩ in five words only, all enumerated in the phrase Det är lättare att stjäla en stjälk än att stjälpa en stjärna med stjärten (It is easier to steal a stalk than to overturn a star with your behind)
- ⟨-tion⟩, ⟨-sion⟩, ⟨-ssion⟩ (/ɧuːn/) in many words of Latin origin, e. g. station, information (in a few of these words, the sje-sound is preceded by a /t/, e. g. nation, rationell); also ⟨ti⟩ for /ɧ/ is used before vowels in some adjective derivations (e. g. pretentiös, infektiös)
- ⟨xj⟩ for the sequence /kɧ/ occurs only in the place-name Växjö

== See also ==
- Swedish orthography
- Swedish phonology
- Swedish Dialect Alphabet
- Danish orthography
- Finnish orthography
- German orthography
- Icelandic orthography
- Norwegian orthography
- Runes (fuþark, or futhark)
- Swedish Braille
