= Mor Maman =

Mor Maman may refer to:

- Mor Maman (footballer) (born 1986), Israeli defender
- Mor Maman (beauty queen) (born 1995), Miss Israel 2014

== See also ==
- Maman (disambiguation)
