= 2003 UEFA European Under-17 Championship qualification =

Tournament details
- Dates: 2002 (qualifying round); 2003 (elite round)
- Teams: 51 (from 1 confederation)

The 2003 UEFA European Under-17 Championship qualifying competition was an under-17 football competition played in 2002 and 2003 to determine the 7 teams joining Portugal, who qualified automatically as hosts, in the 2003 UEFA European Under-17 Championship final tournament.

The final tournament also acted as the UEFA qualifier for the 2003 FIFA U-17 World Championship in Finland, with two teams qualifying, Portugal and Spain, as finalists.

== Format ==
The qualifying competition consisted of two rounds:

- Qualifying round: Apart from six nations (Spain, England, Russia, Finland, Poland and Hungary), which received a bye to the elite round, the remaining 44 teams were drawn into 11 groups of four teams. Each group was played in single round-robin format at one of the teams selected as hosts after the draw. Two best teams from each group advanced to the elite round.
- Elite round: The 28 teams were drawn into seven groups of four teams. Each group was played in single round-robin format at one of the teams selected as hosts after the draw. The seven group winners qualified for the final tournament.

== Qualifying round ==
=== Groups ===
==== Group 1 ====
Pos	Team	Pld	W	D	L	GF	GA	GD	Pts	Qualification
1	Italy	3	3	0	0	9	1	+8	9	Elite round
2	Bulgaria	3	2	0	1	14	2	+12	6	Elite round
3	Latvia	3	1	0	2	3	8	−5	3	
4	Andorra (H)	3	0	0	3	2	17	−15	0	

Source: UEFA
(H) Hosts

==== Group 2 ====
Pos	Team	Pld	W	D	L	GF	GA	GD	Pts	Qualification
1	Croatia	3	2	0	1	10	4	+6	6	Elite round
2	FR Yugoslavia	3	2	0	1	5	3	+2	6	Elite round
3	Belarus	3	2	0	1	5	8	−3	6	
4	Georgia	3	0	0	3	2	7	−5	0	

Source: worldfootball

==== Group 3 ====
Pos	Team	Pld	W	D	L	GF	GA	GD	Pts	Qualification
1	Israel	3	2	1	0	7	3	+4	7	Elite round
2	Switzerland	3	2	0	1	5	5	0	6	Elite round
3	Iceland	3	0	2	1	1	3	−2	2	
4	Armenia	3	0	1	2	4	6	−2	1	

Source: worldfootball

==== Group 4 ====
Pos	Team	Pld	W	D	L	GF	GA	GD	Pts	Qualification
1	Czech Republic	3	2	1	0	10	2	+8	7	Elite round
2	Belgium	3	2	1	0	9	3	+6	7	Elite round
3	Cyprus	3	1	0	2	5	5	0	3	
4	Estonia	3	0	0	3	2	16	−14	0	

Source: worldfootball

==== Group 5 ====
Pos	Team	Pld	W	D	L	GF	GA	GD	Pts	Qualification
1	Wales	3	3	0	0	6	3	+3	9	Elite round
2	Norway	3	2	0	1	4	3	+1	6	Elite round
3	Luxembourg	3	1	0	2	1	2	−1	3	
4	Bosnia and Herzegovina	3	0	0	3	1	4	−3	0	

Source: worldfootball

==== Group 6 ====
Pos	Team	Pld	W	D	L	GF	GA	GD	Pts	Qualification
1	Austria	3	3	0	0	10	1	+9	9	Elite round
2	Romania	3	2	0	1	13	2	+11	6	Elite round
3	Macedonia	3	1	0	2	2	6	−4	3	
4	Faroe Islands	3	0	0	3	0	16	−16	0	

Source: worldfootball

==== Group 7 ====
Pos	Team	Pld	W	D	L	GF	GA	GD	Pts	Qualification
1	Greece	3	2	1	0	9	3	+6	7	Elite round
2	Slovakia	3	2	0	1	6	2	+4	6	Elite round
3	Moldova	3	1	1	1	8	4	+4	4	
4	Liechtenstein	3	0	0	3	1	15	−14	0	

Source: worldfootball

==== Group 8 ====
Pos	Team	Pld	W	D	L	GF	GA	GD	Pts	Qualification
1	Germany	3	2	1	0	6	1	+5	7	Elite round
2	France	3	2	1	0	3	1	+2	7	Elite round
3	Slovenia	3	0	1	2	3	6	−3	1	
4	Republic of Ireland	3	0	1	2	1	5	−4	1	

Source: worldfootball

==== Group 9 ====
Pos	Team	Pld	W	D	L	GF	GA	GD	Pts	Qualification
1	Denmark	3	2	1	0	4	2	+2	7	Elite round
2	Northern Ireland	3	2	1	0	2	0	+2	7	Elite round
3	Sweden	3	1	0	2	10	4	+6	3	
4	Malta	3	0	0	3	0	10	−10	0	

Source: worldfootball

==== Group 10 ====
Pos	Team	Pld	W	D	L	GF	GA	GD	Pts	Qualification
1	Netherlands	3	2	1	0	8	2	+6	7	Elite round
2	Albania	3	2	1	0	5	2	+3	7	Elite round
3	Lithuania	3	1	0	2	3	7	−4	3	
4	San Marino	3	0	0	3	0	5	−5	0	

Source: worldfootball

==== Group 11 ====
Pos	Team	Pld	W	D	L	GF	GA	GD	Pts	Qualification
1	Scotland	3	2	0	1	6	6	0	6	Elite round
2	Azerbaijan	3	1	1	1	5	5	0	4	Elite round
3	Turkey	3	1	1	1	5	4	+1	4	
4	Ukraine	3	0	2	1	7	8	−1	2	

Source: worldfootball

== Elite round ==
=== Groups ===
All times were CET (UTC+1).

==== Group 1 ====
Pos	Team	Pld	W	D	L	GF	GA	GD	Pts	Qualification
1	Spain (H, Q)	3	3	0	0	8	0	+8	9	Final tournament
2	France	3	2	0	1	9	2	+7	6	
3	Wales	3	1	0	2	4	12	−8	3	
4	Bulgaria	3	0	0	3	2	9	−7	0	

Source: UEFA
(H) Hosts; (Q) Qualified for the phase indicated

==== Group 2 ====
Pos	Team	Pld	W	D	L	GF	GA	GD	Pts	Qualification
1	Denmark (Q)	3	2	0	1	6	4	+2	6	Final tournament
2	Croatia (H)	3	2	0	1	4	3	+1	6	
3	Russia	3	1	1	1	3	2	+1	4	
4	Norway	3	0	1	2	1	5	−4	1	

Source: UEFA
(H) Hosts; (Q) Qualified for the phase indicated

==== Group 3 ====
Pos	Team	Pld	W	D	L	GF	GA	GD	Pts	Qualification
1	Austria (Q)	3	1	2	0	4	2	+2	5	Final tournament
2	Serbia and Montenegro	3	1	2	0	5	4	+1	5	
3	Northern Ireland	3	1	0	2	2	4	−2	3	
4	Finland	3	0	2	1	1	2	−1	2	

Source: worldfootball
(Q) Qualified for the phase indicated

==== Group 4 ====
Pos	Team	Pld	W	D	L	GF	GA	GD	Pts	Qualification
1	Israel (Q)	3	2	1	0	4	1	+3	7	Final tournament
2	Netherlands	3	1	2	0	5	4	+1	5	
3	Romania	3	1	1	1	4	5	−1	4	
4	Poland	3	0	0	3	2	5	−3	0	

Source: worldfootball
(Q) Qualified for the phase indicated

==== Group 5 ====
Pos	Team	Pld	W	D	L	GF	GA	GD	Pts	Qualification
1	Hungary (Q)	3	2	1	0	6	3	+3	7	Final tournament
2	Switzerland	3	1	1	1	2	2	0	4	
3	Greece	3	1	1	1	2	3	−1	4	
4	Albania	3	0	1	2	3	5	−2	1	

Source: worldfootball
(Q) Qualified for the phase indicated

==== Group 6 ====
Pos	Team	Pld	W	D	L	GF	GA	GD	Pts	Qualification
1	England (Q)	3	3	0	0	9	0	+9	9	Final tournament
2	Scotland	3	1	1	1	3	2	+1	4	
3	Czech Republic	3	1	0	2	3	5	−2	3	
4	Slovakia	3	0	1	2	0	8	−8	1	

Source: worldfootball
(Q) Qualified for the phase indicated

==== Group 7 ====
Pos	Team	Pld	W	D	L	GF	GA	GD	Pts	Qualification
1	Italy (Q)	3	2	1	0	6	1	+5	7	Final tournament
2	Belgium	3	2	0	1	3	4	−1	6	
3	Germany	3	1	1	1	5	3	+2	4	
4	Azerbaijan	3	0	0	3	0	6	−6	0	

Source: worldfootball
(Q) Qualified for the phase indicated

== Qualified teams ==
The following 8 teams qualified for the final tournament.

Country	Qualified as	Previous appearances in tournament^{1} only U-17 era (since 2002)
Portugal	Hosts	**1** (2002)
Spain	Group 1 winner	**1** (2002)
Denmark	Group 2 winner	**1** (2002)
Austria	Group 3 winner	**0** (debut)
Israel	Group 4 winner	**0** (debut)
Hungary	Group 5 winner	**1** (2002)
England	Group 6 winner	**1** (2002)
Italy	Group 7 winner	**0** (debut)

^{1} Bold indicates champion for that year. Italics indicate host.
