= Lafões =

Lafões may refer to the following places in Portugal:

- Pinheiro de Lafões, a parish in the municipality of Oliveira de Frades
- São Cristóvão de Lafões, a parish in the municipality of Oliveira de Frades
- São Vicente de Lafões, a parish in the municipality of Oliveira de Frades
- Souto de Lafões, a parish in the municipality of São Pedro do Sul

The Duke of Lafões may refer to a former duke title of Portugal
