= Márcio Sousa =

Portuguese footballer

Personal information
- Full name: Márcio Daniel Ribeiro de Sousa
- Date of birth: 23 March 1986 (age 40)
- Place of birth: Sande, Portugal
- Height: 1.69 m (5 ft 7 in)
- Position: Midfielder

Youth career
- 1995–1996: Torcatense
- 1996–2002: Vitória Guimarães
- 2002–2005: Porto

Senior career*
Years	Team	Apps	(Gls)
2003–2007	Porto B	24	(1)
2006	→ Covilhã (loan)	7	(0)
2006–2007	→ Vizela (loan)	6	(0)
2007–2008	Rio Maior	27	(1)
2008–2009	Nelas	11	(1)
2009	Penafiel	13	(0)
2009–2010	Esmoriz	30	(6)
2010–2015	Tondela	134	(17)
2015–2016	Farense	24	(1)
2016–2017	Lusitano VRSA	11	(0)
2017	Limianos	13	(0)
2017–2018	Moncarapachense	25	(2)
2018	Torcatense	14	(0)
2019	Ninense	15	(3)
2019–2020	Vilaverdense	13	(1)
2020–2021	Sandinenses	12	(1)
Total		379	(34)

International career
2001–2002	Portugal U16	6	(2)
2002–2003	Portugal U17	24	(6)
2004	Portugal U18	5	(1)
2004–2005	Portugal U19	14	(4)
Medal record
Men's football
Representing Portugal
UEFA European U17 Championship
Winner	2003 Portugal
- * Club domestic league appearances and goals

Márcio Daniel Ribeiro de Sousa (born 23 March 1986) is a Portuguese former professional footballer who played as an attacking midfielder.

He amassed LigaPro totals of 110 matches and four goals over six seasons, mainly with Tondela (three years). He spent the rest of his career in the lower leagues.

Sousa was a youth international for Portugal, notably winning the European Under-17 Championship.

== Club career ==
Born in the village of Sande (São Clemente) in Guimarães, Sousa moved to FC Porto's youth system at the age of 16 alongside Rabiola and Vieirinha, in a deal that sent Brazilian striker Rafael in the opposite direction. On 17 December 2003, he was called by first-team coach José Mourinho for a Taça de Portugal match against F.C. Maia, but eventually did not leave the bench, subsequently returning to the juniors.

After being released by Porto in June 2007, Sousa spent several seasons in the lower divisions of his country. Prior to that, he competed in the Segunda Liga on loan, with S.C. Covilhã and F.C. Vizela.

Sousa signed for C.D. Tondela in July 2010, scoring nine times in 32 games in his second year as they promoted to the second tier for the first time ever. He made his league debut with the club on 12 August 2012 in a 2–2 home draw against FC Porto B, and scored his first goal on 23 September to help the hosts to defeat Associação Naval 1º de Maio 3–1.

Having been deemed surplus to requirements, Sousa joined S.C. Farense of the same league in summer 2015. He found the net in the last matchday against Gil Vicente FC, but the 3–2 away win amounted to nothing as the team finished in 20th position and were relegated.

Until his retirement, Sousa competed exclusively in the lower leagues or amateur football. Early in his career, he earned the nickname Maradona.

== International career ==
Sousa helped Portugal under-17s to win their fifth title in the category in the 2003 UEFA European Championship held on home soil, scoring twice; both goals came in the final against Spain. He was also part of the squad that reached the quarter-finals in that year's FIFA World Cup in Finland, netting once.

In 2004, Sousa played for the under-19 side in the 2005 European Championship qualifiers, scoring in a 4–1 away victory over Bosnia and Herzegovina, but the country failed to ensure a place in the finals in Northern Ireland.

== Post-retirement ==
After retiring in 2021 at age 35, Sousa worked as a dispatcher for a fire department in the Algarve.

== Career statistics ==
As of 24 February 2016

Club	Season	League		Cup		League Cup		Europe		Total	
Club	Season	Apps	Goals	Apps	Goals	Apps	Goals	Apps	Goals	Apps	Goals
Porto B	2003–04	1	0	-		-		-		1	0
Porto B	2004–05	16	0	-		-		-		16	0
Porto B	2005–06	7	0	-		-		-		7	0
Porto B	Total	24	0	–		–		–		24	0
Covilhã	2005–06	7	0	0	0	-		-		7	0
Vizela	2006–07	6	0	0	0	-		-		6	10
Rio Maior	2007–08	27	1	1	0	-		-		28	1
Nelas	2008–09	11	1	0	0	-		-		11	1
Penafiel	2008–09	13	0	0	0	-		-		13	0
Esmoriz	2009–10	30	6	2	1	-		-		32	7
Tondela	2010–11	29	5	1	0	-		-		30	5
Tondela	2011–12	32	9	4	1	-		-		36	10
Tondela	2012–13	41	2	1	0	2	0	-		44	2
Tondela	2013–14	29	1	1	0	3	0	-		33	1
Tondela	2014–15	3	0	0	0	2	0	-		5	0
Tondela	Total	134	17	7	1	7	0	–		158	18
Farense	2015–16	17	0	1	0	1	0	-		19	0
Career totals		222	22	8	2	3	0	-		288	24

== Honours ==
Tondela

- Segunda Liga: 2014–15

Portugal

- UEFA European Under-17 Championship: 2003
