= Qvist =

Qvist is a surname of Scandinavian origin. People with the surname include:

- Anders Qvist (born 1987), Danish professional football defender
- Arthur Qvist (1896–1973), Norwegian horse rider and Olympic athlete; also Norwegian Commander of the Norwegian Volunteer SS Legion in World War II
- Eetu Qvist (born 1983), Finnish former ice hockey player
- Gabriella Qvist (born 2003), Danish curler
- Lasse Qvist (born 1987), Danish football player
- Maria Qvist (1879–1958), Swedish politician
- Mikael Qvist, Danish curler and coach
- Ole Qvist (born 1950), former Danish international footballer
- Per Olov Qvist (born 1948), Swedish film critic
- Trine Qvist (born 1966), Danish curler and Olympic medalist
- Tom Blomqvist (born 1993), British racing driver
- Felix Rosenqvist (born 1991), Swedish racing driver
- Linus Lundqvist (born 1999), Swedish racing driver

== See also ==
- Quist (surname)
- Kvist (surname)
