= Norwegian orthography =

Norwegian language writing conventions

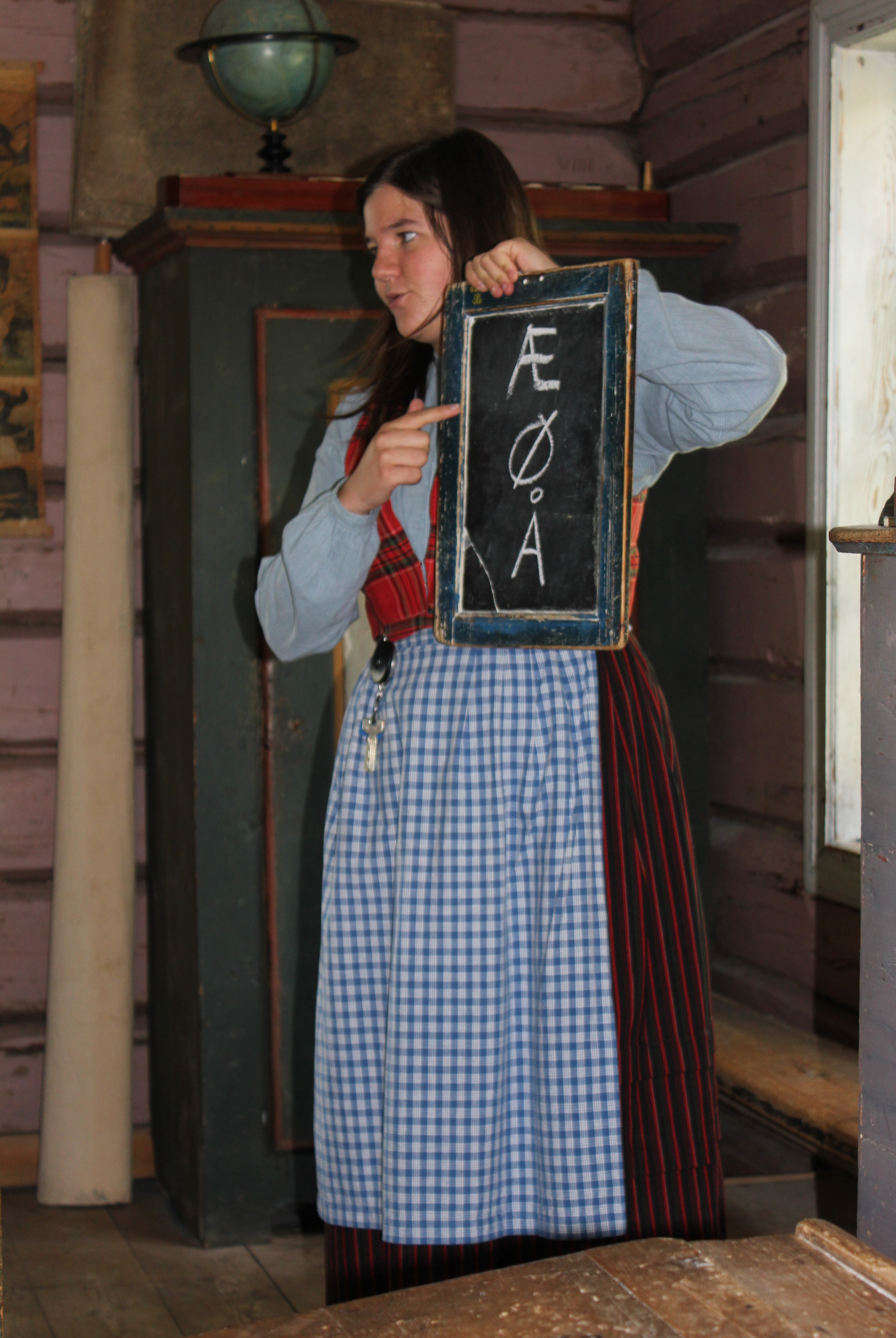
Teaching the Norwegian letters Æ, Ø and Å

Norwegian alphabet
Norwegian speaker reciting the alphabet in Norwegian

Norwegian orthography is the method of writing the Norwegian language, of which there are two written standards: Bokmål and Nynorsk. While Bokmål has for the most part derived its forms from the written Danish language and Danish-Norwegian speech, Nynorsk gets its word forms from Aasen's reconstructed "base dialect", which is intended to represent the distinctive dialectal forms. Both standards use a 29-letter variant of the Latin alphabet and the same orthographic principles.

== Alphabet ==
The Norwegian alphabet is based upon the Latin alphabet and is identical to the Danish alphabet. Since 1917 it has consisted of the following 29 letters.

Letter		Name
A	a	/ɑː/
B	b	/beː/
C	c	/seː/
D	d	/deː/
E	e	/eː/
F	f	/ɛf/
G	g	/ɡeː/
H	h	/hoː/
I	i	/iː/
J	j	/jeː/ or /jɔd/
K	k	/kʰoː/
L	l	/ɛl/
M	m	/ɛm/
N	n	/ɛn/
O	o	/uː/
P	p	/pʰeː/
Q	q	/kʰʉː/
R	r	/ær/
S	s	/ɛs/
T	t	/tʰeː/
U	u	/ʉː/
V	v	/veː/
W	w	/dɔbəltveː/
X	x	/ɛks/
Y	y	/yː/
Z	z	/sɛt/
Æ	æ	/æː/
Ø	ø	/øː/
Å	å	/oː/

The letters c, q, w, x and z are not used in the spelling of native Norwegian words. They are rarely used; loanwords routinely have their orthography adapted to the native sound system.

== Diacritics ==
Norwegian (especially the Nynorsk variant) also uses several letters with diacritic signs: é, è, ê, ó, ò, ô and ù. The diacritic signs are not compulsory, but can be added to clarify the meaning of words (homonyms) which otherwise would be identical. One example is ein gut ("a boy") versus éin gut ("one boy"), in Nynorsk, and en gutt ("a boy") versus én gutt ("one boy") in Bokmål. Diacritics are obligatory in foreign proper names that use them, like Rhône, Liège, Linné, München. In other loanwords diacritics are optional, like crème fraîche, tête-à-tête. If the loanword has been adapted for Norwegian use, diacritics that were there originally should not be included, as in ampere, bohem, opera. Note the letters æ, ø and å never take diacritics.

The diacritic signs in use include the acute accent, grave accent and the circumflex. A common example of how the diacritics change the meaning of a word can be seen with the word for:

- for (preposition. "for", "to", Bokmål and Nynorsk)
- fór (verb. "went", in the sense "went quickly", Bokmål and Nynorsk)
- fòr (noun. "furrow", Nynorsk only)
- fôr (noun. "fodder", "feed", Bokmål and Nynorsk)

ò can be used in òg, meaning "also". This word is found in both Nynorsk and Bokmål. An example of ê in Nynorsk is vêr, meaning "weather".

== Sound-to-spelling correspondences ==
=== Vowels ===
Grapheme		IPA		Examples	Notes
Grapheme		short	long	Examples	Notes
a		/ɑ/	/ɑː/	arg "angry" far "father"	
e	usually	/ɛ/	/eː/	pest "plague" evig "eternal"	
e	before ⟨r⟩	/æ/	/æː/	erge "to anger" er "is"	
e	unstressed	/ə/		gamle "old (pl.)"	plural of gammel/gamal
i		/ɪ/	/iː/	litt "a little" mil "mile"	Usually the Scandinavian mile, i.e. 10 km
o		/ɔ, ʊ/	/uː, oː/	topp "top", rom "room" mose "to mash", flog "steep cliff"	
u		/ʉ, ʊ/	/ʉː/	lugg "bangs", skuff "drawer" rute "route"	
y		/ʏ/	/yː/	rydde "to clear" fryse "to freeze"	
æ	usually	/ɛ/	/eː/	ætt "family, clan" hæl "heel"	
æ	before ⟨r⟩	/æ/	/æː/	nærme seg "to get closer" kjær "dear"	
ø		/œ/	/øː/	tømmer "timber" brød "bread"	
å		/ɔ/	/oː/	åst "love" flå "to flay"	

- Vowel length can usually be deduced from the spelling based on the rule that short vowels are followed by two or more consonant letters, while long vowels are followed by at most one consonant letter. There are, however, certain exceptions to this rule where vowel length must be memorised.
- In those cases where the same letter can represent two different vowel qualities, the first given vowel is by far predominant (for example, short ⟨o⟩ is usually /ɔ/, long ⟨o⟩ is usually /uː/). Words where the other vowel quality occurs should, again, be memorised as exceptions.

=== Vowel-digraph combinations ===
Grapheme	IPA	Examples
ai	/ɑɪ̯/	hai "shark"
ei, eg	/æɪ̯/	meir "more" meg "me"
øy, øg	/œʏ̯/	til høyre "to the right" løgn "lie"
au, eu	/æʉ̯/	raus "generous" terapeut "therapist"
oi	/ɔʏ̯/	koie "primitive hut"

=== Consonants ===
Grapheme		IPA	Examples	Notes
b		/b/	barn [ˈbɑɳ] "child" by [ˈbyː] "town"	
d	usually	/d/	dør [ˈdøːr] "door" dyr [ˈdyːr] "animal"	
d	morpheme-finally after ⟨l⟩ or ⟨n⟩	∅	kald [ˈkɑlː] "cold" hånd [ˈhɔnː] "hand"	May also be silent within a morpheme (e.g. bonde "farmer") and morpheme-finally after a long vowel (e.g. god "good", blod "blood", rød "red", glad "happy", med "with")
dj		/j/	djup [ˈjʉːp] "deep"	The d might also be pronounced in many dialects, like in djevel [(d)jeːʋəl] "devil"
f		/f/	far [ˈfɑːr] "father" fisk [ˈfɪsk] "fish"	Sometimes silent in the archaic word tylft [ˈtʏl(f)t] "dozen"
g	usually	/ɡ/	god [ɡuː] "good" Norge [ˈnɔ̀rɡə] "Norway"	/j/ in the words jeg "I", meg' "me", deg "you" (singular), seg "oneself", geit "goat", Sverige "Sweden". Silent in morgen "morning" and in the unstressed form of pronouns jeg, meg, deg, seg. May be silent in the word og "and".
g	before ⟨i⟩ or ⟨y⟩	/j/	å gi [ɔ ˈjiː] "to give" gyldig [ˈjʏ̂ldɪ] "valid"	Pronounced /ɡ/ in loanwords (e.g. gitar [ɡiˈtɑr] "guitar", gymnas [ɡʏmˈnɑːs] "grammar school")
g	in the suffix -ig and -lig	∅	søvnig [ˈsœ̂vnɪ] "sleepy" vennlig [ˈvɛ̂nlɪ] "friendly"	Pronounced /k/ before the suffix -st (e.g. søvnigst [ˈsœ̂vnɪkst] "sleepiest", vennligst [ˈvɛ̂nlɪkst] "friendliest")
gj		/j/	gjøre [ˈjø̂ːrə] "to do" gjest [ˈjɛst] "guest"	
gn	after a vowel in the same morpheme	/ŋn/	sogn [ˈsɔŋn] "parish" signal [sɪŋˈnɑːl] "signal"	Pronounced /ɡn/ if followed by ⟨e⟩ or ⟨ø⟩
gn	otherwise	/ɡn/	regn [ˈræɪn] "rain"	
h		/h/	hus [ˈhʉːs] "house" hånd [ˈhɔnː] "hand"	
hj		/j/	hjelp [ˈjɛlp] "help" hjerte [ˈjæ̂ʈːə] "heart"	
hv		/v/	hvit [ˈviːt] "white" hvem [vɛmː] "who"	
j		/j/	jul [ˈjʉːl] "Christmas" jage [ˈjɑːgə] "chase"	
k	usually	/k/	kul [ˈkʉːl] "cool" kake [ˈkɑːkə] "cake"	
k	before ⟨i⟩ or ⟨y⟩	/ç/	kino [ˈçiːnʊ] "cinema" kyr [ˈçy̫ːr] "cows"	
kj		/ç/	kjele [ˈçeːlə] "boiler" kjenne [ˈçɛnːə] "feel"	
l		/l/ or /ɽ/	lår [ˈlɔːr] "leg" lunge [ˈluŋə] "lung"	
lj		/j/	ljå [ˈjɔː] "scythe" ljuge [ˈjʉːgə] "lie"	
lv		/l/	sjølv [ʃøːl] "self" halv [ˈhɑlː(v)] "half"	
m		/m/	mage [ˈmɑgə] "stomach" moldvarp [ˈmɔlː(d)varp] "mole"	
n		/n/	nektar [ˈnɛktɑr] "nectar/refuses" nei [ˈnæɪ] "no"	
ng		/ŋ/	konge [ˈkɔ̂ŋə] "king" pingvin [pɪŋˈviːn] "penguin"	Pronounced /ŋɡ/ in some loanwords (e.g. kenguru [ˈkɛŋɡʉrʉ] "kangaroo")
p		/p/		
r		/r/, /ɾ/, /ʁ/, or /χ/	rar [ˈrɑːr] "weird"	
rd		[ɖ], /ɾ/, /ɽ/, or /ʁ(d)/		
rl		[ɭ] or /ʁl/		
rn		[ɳ] or /ʁn/		
rs		/ʂ/ or /ʁs/		
rt		[ʈ] or /ʁt/		
s	usually	/s/		
s	before ⟨l⟩ outside a morpheme	/s/	løslate [ˈløːsˌlɑ̂ːtə] "to release"	
s	before ⟨l⟩ within a morpheme	/ʂ/	slange [ˈʂlɑ̂ŋːə] "snake" Oslo [ˈʊ̂ʂlʊ] "Oslo"	Can be pronounced /s/ in loanwords (e.g. islam [ɪsˈlɑːm, ɪʂˈlɑːm] "Islam")
sj		/ʂ/	sjuk [ʂʉːk] "sick" sju [ʂʉː] "Seven"	
sk	usually	/sk/		
sk	before ⟨i⟩ or ⟨y⟩	/ʂ/	ski [ʂiː] "ski" sky [ʂy̫ː] "cloud"	
skj		/ʂ/	skjule [ʂʉːlə] "hide (something)"	
t		/t/		Silent in the word det "the, that, it" and the neuter definite suffix -et
tj		/ç/	tjukk [çʉkː] "thick" tjue [çʉːə] "twenty"	
v		/v/		Silent in these words followed by ⟨l⟩: selv [ˈsɛlː] "self", halv [ˈhɑlː] "half", tolv [tɔlː] "twelve" and unstressed av [ɑ] "of"

== History ==
The letter Å was officially introduced in Norwegian in 1917, replacing Aa or aa. The new letter came from the Swedish alphabet, where it had been in official use since the 18th century. The former digraph Aa still occurs in personal names. Geographical names tend to follow the current orthography, meaning that the letter å will be used. Family names may not follow modern orthography, and as such retain the digraph aa where å would be used today. Aa remains in use as a transliteration, if the letter is not available for technical reasons. Aa is treated like Å in alphabetical sorting, not like two adjacent letters A, meaning that while a is the first letter of the alphabet, aa is the last. This rule does not apply to non-Scandinavian names, so a modern atlas would list the German city of Aachen under A but list the Danish city of Aabenraa under Å.

A difference between the Dano-Norwegian and the Swedish alphabet is that Swedish uses the variant Ä instead of Æ, and the variant Ö instead of Ø (like German). Also, the collating order for these three letters is different: Å, Ä, Ö.

== Computing standards ==
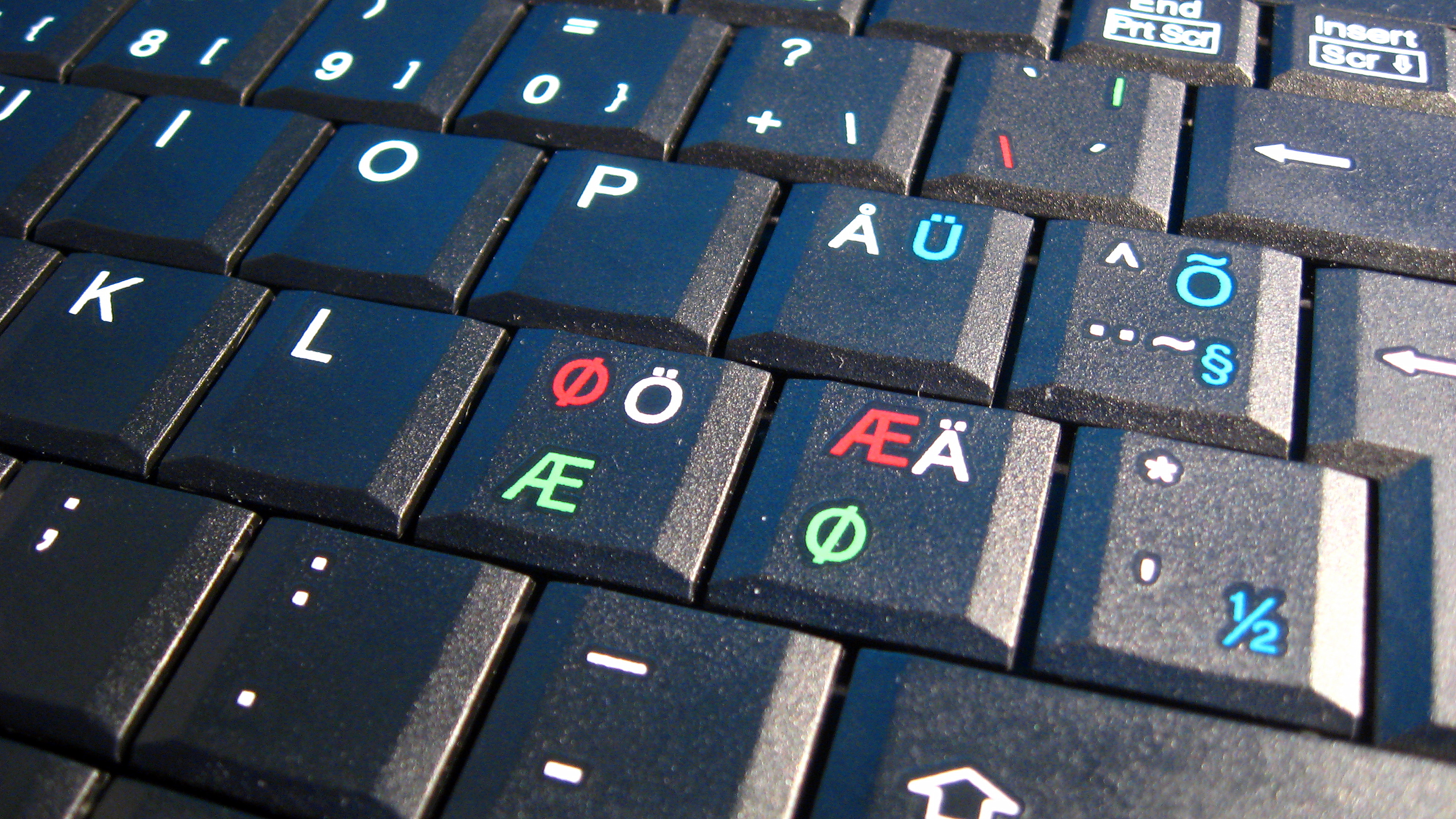
Swedish computer keyboard with white markings for common characters, red for Norwegian (Ø, Æ), light green for Danish (Æ, Ø) and blue-green for Estonian (Ü, Õ, §, ½).

In computing, several different coding standards have existed for this alphabet:

- IBM PC code page 865
- ISO 8859-1
- NS 4551-1, later established in international standard ISO 646
- Unicode

== See also ==
- Norwegian phonology
- Norwegian language conflict
- Danish phonology
- Futhark, the Germanic runes used formerly
- Icelandic orthography
- Latin spelling alphabets
- Swedish alphabet
