= Kvist =

Kvist is a surname of Scandinavian origin.

People with the surname include:

- John Kvist (born 1899), Swedish player of American football
- Jon Kvist (born 1967), Danish academic
- Jørgen Kvist (born 1965), Danish politician
- Lars Kvist, Swedish footballer
- Per Kvist (1890–1947), Norwegian writer and actor
- Thomas Kvist (born 1987), Danish road bicycle racer
- William Kvist (born 1985), Danish footballer

== See also ==
- Quist
- Qvist

Kvist is also the name of a Norwegian melodic black metal band that existed from 1993 until 1996.
