= Anta Pintada de Antelas =

Dolmen in Viseu, Portugal

Dolmen de Antelas
- Anta Pintada de Antelas
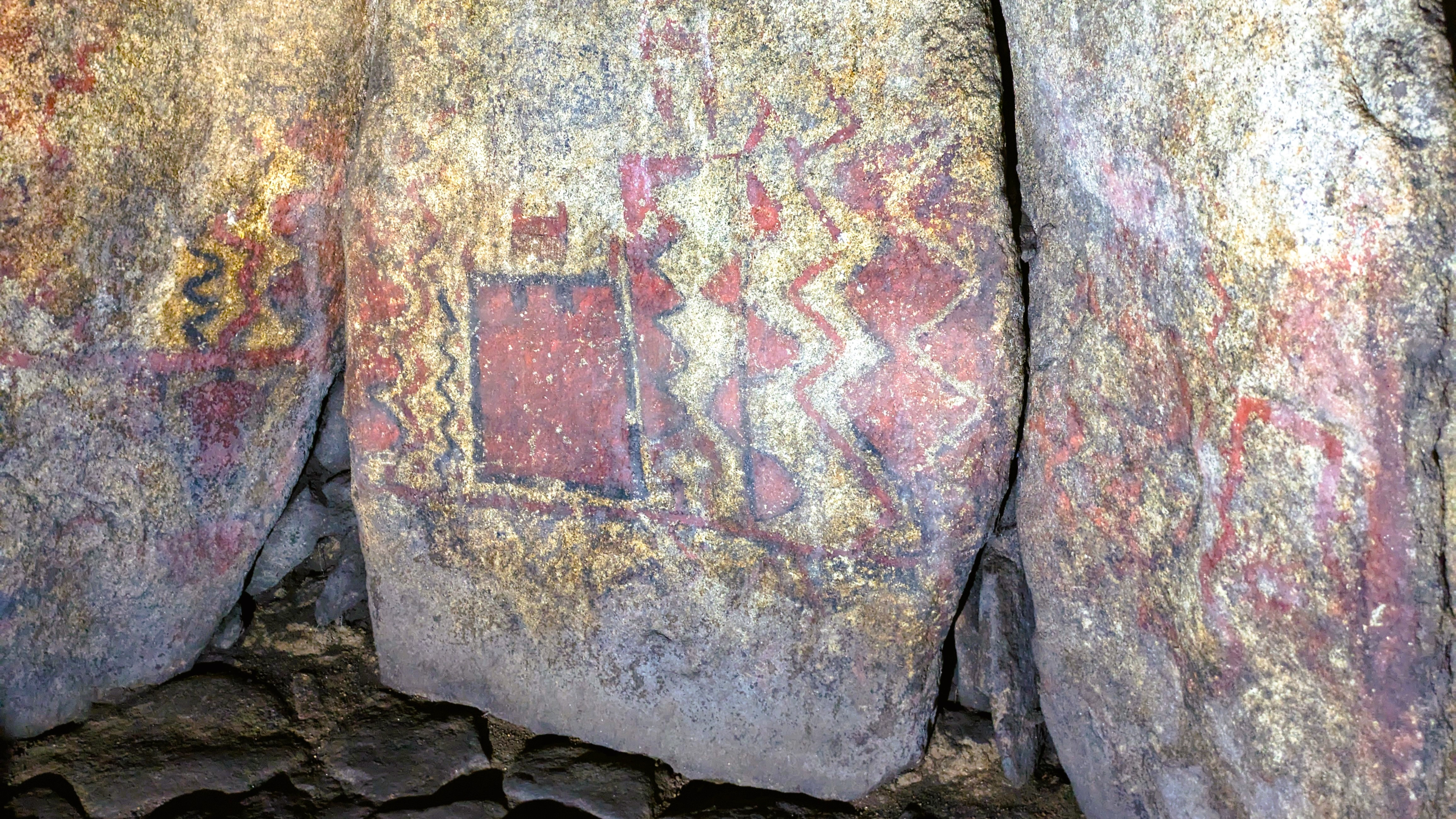
- Paintings inside the tomb
- Interactive map of Dolmen de Antelas
- 40°42′45″N 8°14′38″W
- Type: Dolmen
- Periods: Neolithic
- Location: Oliveira de Frades, Viseu District, Portugal

History
- Built: c. 3750 BCE

Site notes
- Length: 6 m (20 ft)
- Width: 2.4 m (7.9 ft)
- Excavation dates: 1955–56; 1992–93
- Discovered: c. 1920
- Condition: Good
- Owner: Oliveira de Frades municipality
- Public access: On request

The Anta Pintada de Antelas (Antelas Painted Dolmen), also known as the Dolmen de Antelas or the Dolmen Pintada, is located about 250m. east of the village of Antelas, in the parish of Pinheiro de Lafões, in the municipality of Oliveira de Frades in Portugal's Viseu District. Classified as a National Monument since 1990, this dolmen, or megalithic tomb, is notable for its well-preserved set of paintings and engravings, arguably the best from the Neolithic period in the Iberian Peninsula.

== Discovery and research ==
The Anta Pintada de Antelas was first mentioned by the Portuguese geographer, Amorim Girão of the University of Coimbra in his 1921 work, Prehistoric Antiquities of Lafões, in which he noted that the monument stood out "for appearing to us to be absolutely intact". His research was part of a concerted effort at the time to prepare an inventory of the so-called "artistic and archaeological riches" of the country. A list of "national monuments" had been published in 1910, which was the first occasion on which archaeological remains were given the same legal status as other human constructions. Further research was not done until the 1950s, when significant archaeological excavations were carried out by Luís de Albuquerque e Castro, a mining engineer who worked for the General Directorate of Mines and Geological Services, Octávio da Veiga Ferreira, also a mining engineer, and Abel Viana, an archaeologist and ethnographer. At the time they reported that some of the drawings identified by Girão had disappeared and after their research the site was reburied to preserve the paintings. Their research results were published in 1957 in the "Communications of the Geological Services of Portugal", highlighting the number of painted pillars, which they had carefully recorded and interpreted for their symbolism. Albuquerque e Castro went on to present several papers, including one at the "International Congress of Prehistoric and Protohistoric Sciences", held in Rome in 1962, that drew in part on his research at the painted dolmen.

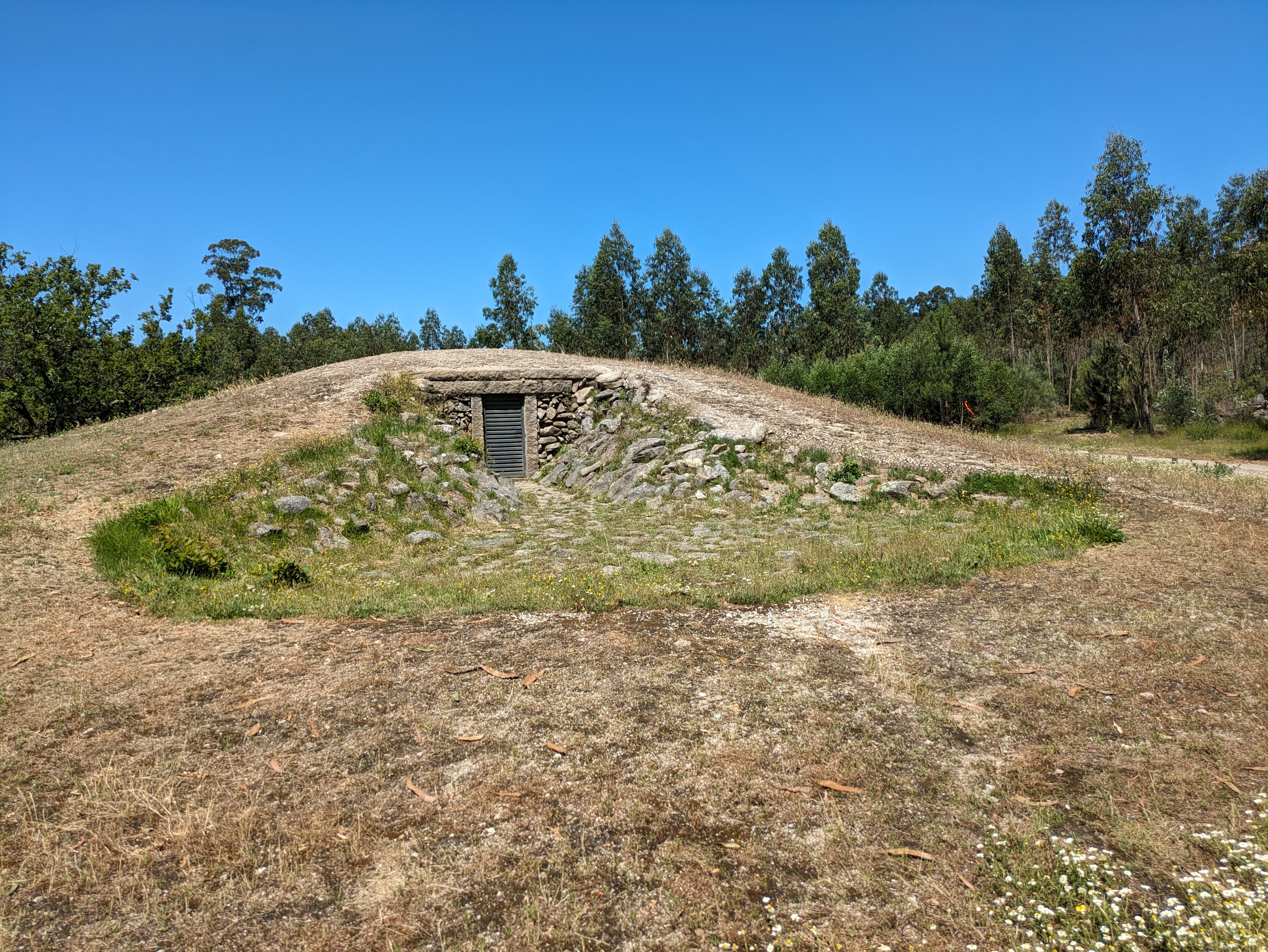
The mound covering the dolmen

In 1992–93 the site was further studied by Domingos Cruz and others as a result of archaeological work, consolidation, and restoration promoted by the Portuguese Institute of Archaeological and Architectural Heritage, the Municipality of Oliveira de Frades, and the Institute of Archaeology of the Faculty of Arts of the University of Coimbra. They identified small hearths and in situ lithic objects, which likely corresponded to offerings or votive deposits. For the first time in Portugal, radiocarbon dating was carried out on the organic substances in the pigments of the paintings and on charcoal samples collected from under the stones. These charcoal studies resulted in the dating of the construction at between 3990 and 3700 BCE. The results obtained from pigment samples of the black paintings suggest an execution or, perhaps, retouching between 3625 and 3140 BCE, so these decorations were either made at the time the site was being used for burials and later retouched or could have been added after the dolmen ceased to be used as a burial chamber. The finds have included a blade, 22 flint tools, and six stone axes. Analyses performed on 15 flint artifacts revealed five possible areas of raw material supply, indicating the complexity of the flint supply circuits. It was observed that most of these artifacts had not been used before their deposition in the graves.

== Description ==
Cruz found the anta to be covered by a tumulus consisting of a buttress, built with medium-sized slabs, to which an earthen mound was attached, superficially protected by stones. Under this, a covered passageway or corridor, opening approximately to the east, and measuring 3.4 metres long, 1.1 metres wide, and 1.3 metres high, is formed by five granite pillars on the north side and four on the south side. This leads to the polygonal burial chamber, measuring 2.6 metres by 2.4 metres, which consists of eight interconnected, overlapping, freestanding (with one exception), granite orthostats, or upright stones, each over two metres high. These are decorated with some fascinating paintings and engravings. During restoration work, an oval forecourt was also uncovered. The paintings on all the upright stones inside the monument are arguably the best-preserved on the Iberian Peninsula. They, and the engravings, contain geometric, abstract and figurative compositions The stones were primed with white kaolin, and black (clay) and red (hematite) designs were painted over the primer. There are also some small relief sculptures of engraved triangles and serpentine lines that frame the paintings. Clearly identifiable are representations of human figures and of the sun and moon, as well as a "comb", considered likely to be the representation of a headdress.

== Classification ==
The Dolmen has been classified as a national monument since 1990.

== Visits ==
Visits are by appointment only by contacting the Oliveira de Frades museum.
