= Estádio do Fontelo =

Stadium in Viseu, Portugal

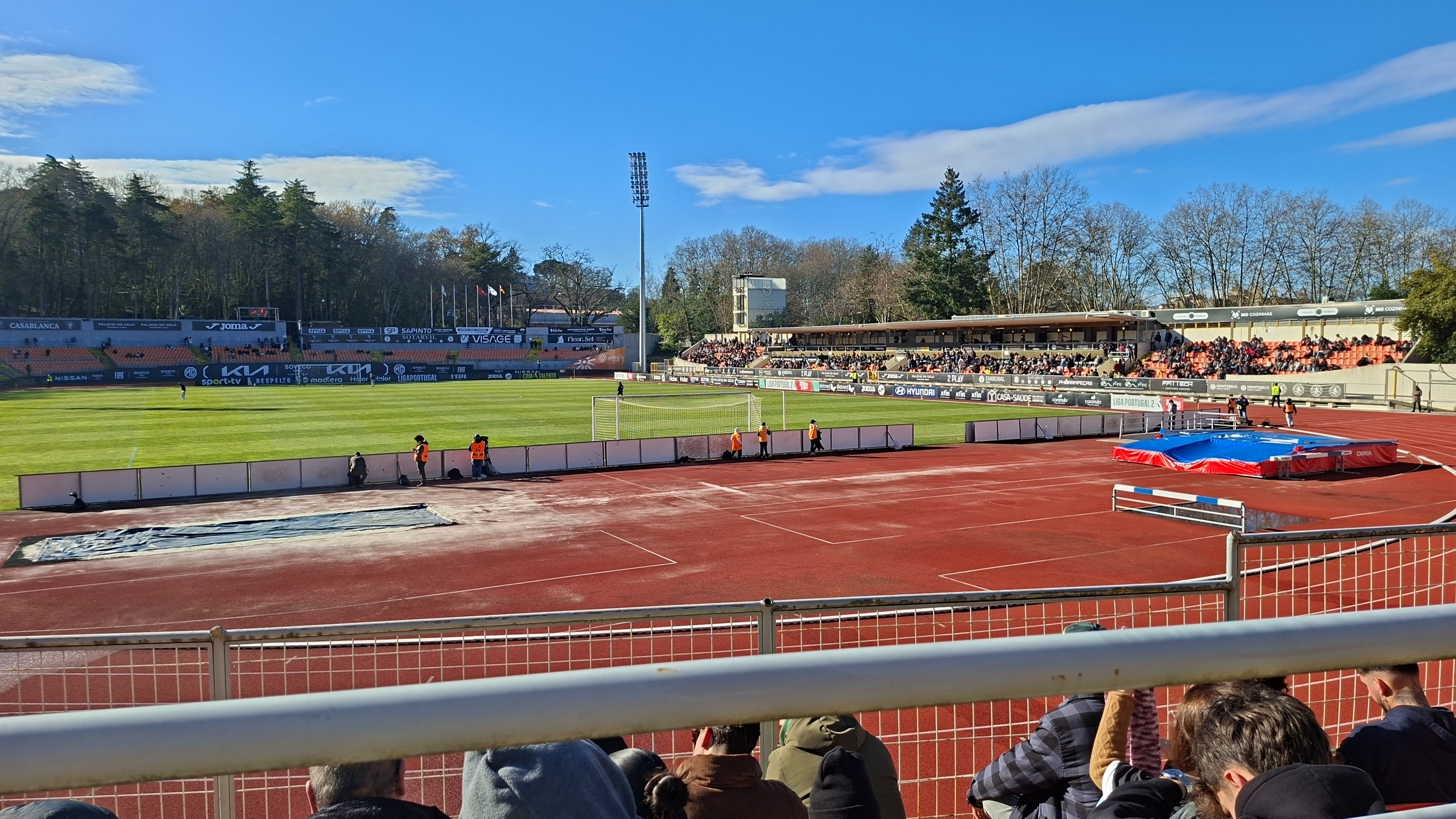
- Interactive map of Estádio do Fontelo
- Full name: Estádio do Fontelo
- Location: Viseu, Portugal
- Coordinates: 40°39′34″N 7°54′03″W
- Owner: CM Viseu
- Capacity: 6,912
- Surface: Grass
- Field size: 105 x 66 m

Construction
- Opened: 1928
- Architect: Luís Vasco Saraiva

Tenants
- Académico de Viseu (1928-present); Under-17 Football Championship (2003); Portugal national football team (selected matches)

The Estádio do Fontelo (Portuguese pronunciation: [ɨˈʃtaðju ðu fõˈtɛlu]; Fontelo Stadium) is a stadium in Viseu, Portugal. It was completed and opened to the public in December 1928. It is mostly used for football matches and hosts the home matches of Académico de Viseu.

== History ==
In 2003 the stadium hosted the 2003 UEFA European Under-17 Football Championship final.

== 2003 UEFA European U-17 matches ==
The stadium was one of the venues of the 2003 UEFA European Under-17 Championship, and held the following matches:

Date		Result		Round
7 May 2003	Portugal	3–2	Denmark	Group A
11 May 2003	Hungary	0–2	Portugal	Group A
14 May 2003	Portugal	2–2 (3–2 on pen.)	England	Semi-final
17 May 2003	Portugal	2–1	Spain	Final

== Portugal national team matches ==
The following national team matches were held in the stadium.

#	Date	Score	Opponent	Competition
1.	16 August 2000	5–1	Lithuania	Friendly
2.	31 May 2008	2–0	Georgia	Friendly
3.	10 November 2017	3-0	Saudi Arabia	Friendly
