= Vítor Vinha =

Portuguese footballer (born 1986)

Personal information
- Full name: Vítor Simões da Vinha
- Date of birth: 11 November 1986 (age 40)
- Place of birth: Oliveira de Frades, Portugal
- Height: 1.81 m (5 ft 11 in)
- Position: Left-back

Team information
- Current team: Benfica (under-23)

Youth career
- 1998–2000: Oliveira de Frades
- 2000–2005: Académica

Senior career*
Years	Team	Apps	(Gls)
2003	Académica B	4	(0)
2005–2009	Académica	36	(0)
2006–2007	→ Tourizense (loan)	2	(0)
2008–2009	→ Estrela Amadora (loan)	8	(0)
2009–2010	Nea Salamis	26	(0)
2010–2011	Aves	26	(4)
2011–2012	Olhanense	10	(0)
2013–2014	Gil Vicente	16	(0)
2014–2015	Beira-Mar	39	(2)
2015–2016	Famalicão	18	(1)
Total		185	(7)

International career
2003	Portugal U17	4	(0)
2005	Portugal U19	6	(0)
2006	Portugal U20	3	(0)
2008	Portugal U21	1	(0)

Managerial career
- 2018: Académica (interim)
- 2019–2020: Académica (youth)
- 2020–2021: Nacional (assistant)
- 2021–2023: Rio Ave (assistant)
- 2024–: Benfica (under-23)
Medal record
Men's football
Representing Portugal
UEFA European U17 Championship
Winner	2003 Portugal
- * Club domestic league appearances and goals

Vítor Simões da Vinha (born 11 November 1986) is a Portuguese former professional footballer who played as a left-back, currently manager of Benfica's under-23 team.

== Playing career ==
=== Club ===
Vinha was born in Oliveira de Frades, Viseu District. He reached Académica de Coimbra's youth system at the age of 13, going on to represent that side, Estrela da Amadora, Olhanense and Gil Vicente in the Primeira Liga, and appeared for Aves, Beira-Mar and Famalicão in the Segunda Liga.

In the 2009–10 season, Vinha competed in the Cypriot First Division with Nea Salamis Famagusta. In June 2010, he considered the possibility of taking the club to court due to unpaid wages.

=== International ===
Vinha won 14 caps for Portugal across all youth levels. His only appearance for the under-21 team occurred on 19 August 2008, as he played the full 90 minutes in a 2–3 friendly home loss against the Czech Republic.

== Coaching career ==
On 7 October 2018, Vinha served as interim manager at his former club Académica after Carlos Pinto had been fired the day before a second-tier match against Estoril. Three days later, João Alves, their seventh coach in less than 18 months, was hired.

Vinha joined Luís Freire's staff at Nacional in December 2020, after having started the season with Académica's under-19s. The pair then spent two years with Rio Ave, achieving promotion to the top flight at the end of the 2021–22 campaign.

On 17 June 2024, Vinha replaced Paulo Lopes as head coach of Benfica's under-23 team.
