= Quist =

Quist is a surname. It usually is of Scandinavian origin as a variant of Qvist. It is also a Dutch toponymic surname from the island of Tholen, referring to a piece of land called `t Quistken. The surname is also common in coastal Ghana, originating during the colonial era from Gold Coast Euro-African unions. People with the surname include:

- Adrian Quist (1913–1991), Australian tennis player
- Allen Quist (born 1944), American (Minnesota) politician
- Anne Quist (born 1957), Dutch rower
- Arvin S. Quist (1933–2018), American scientist and lawyer
- Buster Quist (born 1936), American javelin thrower
- Edward Quist (born 1976), American director, screenwriter, and multidiscipline artist
- Emmanuel Charles Quist (1880–1959), Ghanaian barrister, judge and first Speaker of the Parliament of Ghana
- Flemming Quist Møller (1942–2022), Danish director, screenwriter, animator and voice actor
- Gordon Jay Quist (born 1937), American (Michigan) District Judge
- Harlin Quist (c.1930–2000), American children's books publisher
- Janet Quist (born 1955), American model and actress
- Johan Martin Quist, (1755–1818), Danish architect
- Karl Quist (1875–1957), Australian cricketer
- Leen Quist (1942–2014), Dutch ceramist
- Lucy Quist (born 1974), Ghanaian business executive in England
- Neville Quist (born 1952), Australian fashion designer
- Ofeibea Quist-Arcton (born 1958), Ghanaian radio journalist and broadcaster
- Per-Ola Quist (born 1961), Swedish Olympic swimmer
- Rasmus Quist Hansen (born 1980), Danish rower and Olympic athlete
- Rob Quist (born 1948), American musician and congressional candidate
- Jacob Quistgaard (Quist), Danish guitarist, songwriter and YouTube personality

== See also ==
- Hambrecht & Quist, an investment bank based in San Francisco, California
- Kvist
- Qvist (surname)
- Quist, a henchman of Emilio Largo who was fed to sharks for failing to assassinate James Bond
