= Kasper Kristensen (footballer, born 1986) =

Danish footballer

Personal information
- Date of birth: 27 March 1986 (age 40)
- Place of birth: Denmark
- Position: Midfielder

Team information
- Current team: Hvidovre IF

Youth career
- Virum-Sorgenfri BK

Senior career*
Years	Team	Apps	(Gls)
2004–2011	Lyngby BK		
2011–2012	Brønshøj BK	17	(2)
2012–2013	Elite 3000		
2013–2017	AB	71	(2)
2017–	Hvidovre IF		

International career
2002–2003	Denmark U-17	16	(0)
2004	Denmark U-18	2	(0)
2004–2005	Denmark U-19	8	(0)
- * Club domestic league appearances and goals

Kasper Kristensen (born 27 March 1986) is a Danish professional football midfielder, who currently plays for Hvidovre IF. He is the younger brother of FC København player Thomas Kristensen.
