= Oliveira de Frades =

- Municipality
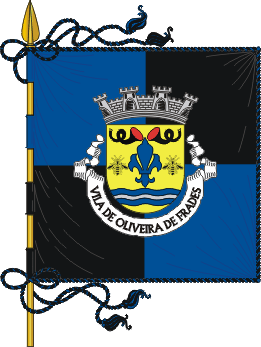
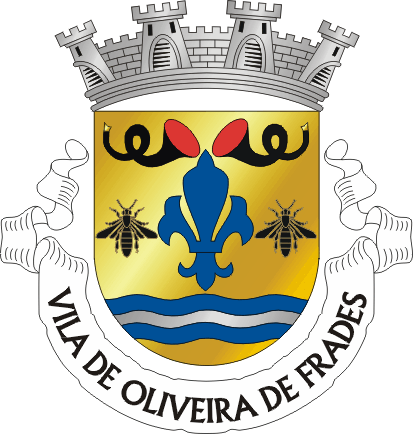
- Flag Coat of arms
- Interactive map of Oliveira dos Frades
- Coordinates: 40°43′N 8°11′W
- Country: Portugal
- Region: Centro
- Intermunic. comm.: Viseu Dão Lafões
- District: Viseu
- Parishes: 8

Government
  - President: Paulo Robalo (PSD)

Area
  - Total: 145.35 km^{2} (56.12 sq mi)

Population (2011)
  - Total: 10,261
  - Density: 70.595/km^{2} (182.84/sq mi)
- Time zone: UTC+00:00 (WET)
  - Summer (DST): UTC+01:00 (WEST)
- Local holiday: October 7
- Website: www.cm-ofrades.com

Oliveira de Frades (European Portuguese pronunciation: [ɔliˈvɐjɾɐ ðɨ ˈfɾaðɨʃ]) is a municipality in the district Viseu in Portugal. The population in 2011 was 10,261, in an area of 145.35 km^{2}.

The municipality was created in 1836 by splitting the former municipality Lafões into the current municipalities of Oliveira de Frades, Sao Pedro do Sul and Vouzela.

It is one of the few municipalities in Portugal without territorial continuity (the other being Montijo and Vila Real de Santo António): its territory comprehends two parts, with the town of Oliveira de Frades located in the bigger part, and Arca e Varzielas in the smaller part.

The present mayor is Paulo Ferreira, elected by the Nós, Cidadãos! party. The municipal holiday is October 7.

== Parishes ==
Administratively, the municipality is divided into 8 civil parishes (freguesias):

- Arca e Varzielas
- Arcozelo das Maias
- Destriz e Reigoso
- Oliveira de Frades, Souto de Lafões e Sejães
- Pinheiro
- Ribeiradio
- São João da Serra
- São Vicente de Lafões

== Notable people ==
- Vítor Vinha (born 1986) a former footballer with 185 club caps

== Places of interest ==
- Anta Pintada de Antelas, a Neolithic dolmen noted for its 5500-year-old paintings.
