= Yakir Lusky =

Israeli footballer

Yakir Lusky יקיר לוסקי
Personal information
- Full name: Ya'acov Yakir Lusky
- Date of birth: 18 March 1986 (age 40)
- Place of birth: Israel
- Position: Midfielder

Youth career
- –2004: Hapoel Tel Aviv

Senior career*
Years	Team	Apps	(Gls)
2004–2008	Hapoel Tel Aviv	10	(0)
2006–2007	→ Hapoel Petah Tikva (loan)	1	(0)
2008	Hakoah Ramat Gan	6	(2)
2008–2009	Hapoel Ashkelon	15	(2)

International career^{‡}
2002–2003	Israel U17	11	(2)
2004–2005	Israel U18	5	(2)
2005	Israel U19	2	(1)
2004	Israel U21	2	(0)
- * Club domestic league appearances and goals as of 03:38, 12 July 2009 (UTC) ‡ National team caps and goals as of 03:57, 31 January 2010 (UTC)

Ya'acov Yakir Lusky (Hebrew: יעקוב יקיר לוסקי; born 18 March 1986), commonly referred to as Yakir Lusky, is an Israeli footballer. He currently is on trial with the Seattle Sounders FC of the Major League Soccer.

== Biography ==
=== Playing career ===
Lusky made his league debut in a Premier League match against Maccabi Netanya on 19 October 2003. In January 2010, he was on trial with the Seattle Sounders FC of the Major League Soccer.

== Statistics ==
Club performance			League		Cup		League Cup		Continental		Total	
Season	Club	League	Apps	Goals	Apps	Goals	Apps	Goals	Apps	Goals	Apps	Goals
Israel			League		Israel State Cup		Toto Cup		Europe		Total	
2006 2007	Hapoel Tel Aviv	Liga Al	0	0	0	0	4	0	0	0	4	0
2007	Hapoel Tel Aviv	Liga Al	3	0	0	0	2	0	0	0	5	0
2008	Hakoah Amidar Ramat Gan	Liga Leumit	4	0	2	1	0	0	0	0	6	1
2008	Hapoel Ashkelon	Liga Artzit	11	1	0	0	4	1	0	0	15	2
Career total			18	1	2	1	10	1	0	0	30	3
