= Maman =

Maman may refer to:

== Places ==
- Maman, East Azerbaijan (ممان - Mamān), Iran
- Maman, Kurdistan (مامن - Māman), Iran

== Arts, entertainment, and media ==
=== Films ===
- Maman (2012 film), a film by Alexandra Leclère
- Maman (1990 film), a film by Romain Goupil
- Maman! (2010 film) (fr), a film by Hélène de Fougerolles

=== Music ===
- "Maman" (2015 song), by French singer Louane
- "Maman" (2025 song), by Louane, France's entry in the 2025 Eurovision Song Contest
- "Maman", a 1966 song by French singer Christophe
- "Maman", a 1976 song by French singer Dalida
- "Maman", a song by Murray Head from 1982 album Shade
- "Мама, мы все тяжело больны", released in France as "Maman", 1988 song and 1989 single by Soviet post-punk band Kino

=== Other arts, entertainment, and media ===
- Maman (sculpture), a 1999 giant spider by Louise Bourgeois
- Maman, a novel by José Germain Drouilly

== Other ==
- Maman (footballer) (born 1980), Indonesian football midfielder
- the French word for mom

== See also ==
- Bonne Maman, a French food company
- Maman Brigitte, a spirit or lwa in Haitian Vodou
