= Xisco Nadal =

Spanish footballer (born 1986)

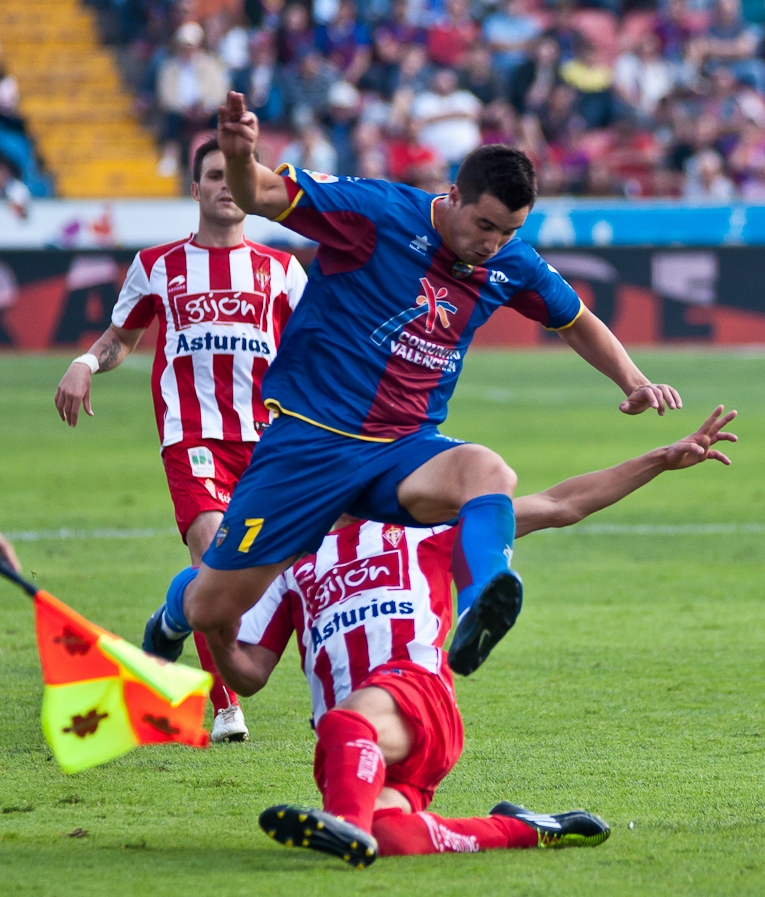
- Nadal with Levante in 2011

Personal information
- Full name: Francisco Sebastián Nadal Martorell
- Date of birth: 27 June 1986 (age 40)
- Place of birth: Palma, Spain
- Height: 1.78 m (5 ft 10 in)
- Positions: Forward; winger

Youth career
- 2001–2003: Villarreal

Senior career*
Years	Team	Apps	(Gls)
2003–2008	Villarreal B		
2003–2007	Villarreal	20	(3)
2004	→ Numancia (loan)	15	(1)
2005	→ Murcia (loan)	0	(0)
2006–2007	→ Hércules (loan)	16	(0)
2008	Granada 74	16	(1)
2008–2011	Levante	90	(6)
2011–2014	Alqueries		
2014–2015	Vinaròs	13	(2)
2015–2016	Segorbe		
2016–2018	Roda	15	(2)
Total		185+	(15+)

International career
2002–2003	Spain U17	13	(4)
2004	Spain U19	1	(0)
Medal record
Representing Spain
Men's football
FIFA U-17 World Cup
Runner-up	2003 Finland
UEFA European Under-17 Championship
Runner-up	2003 Portugal
- * Club domestic league appearances and goals

Francisco Sebastián Nadal Martorell (born 27 June 1986), commonly known as Xisco Nadal, is a Spanish former professional footballer who played mainly as a forward.

== Club career ==
Born in Palma de Mallorca, Balearic Islands, Nadal moved to Villarreal as a baby when his father Sebastián, also a footballer, joined Villarreal CF. He himself made his official debut for the same club against CA Osasuna on 2 February 2003. On 15 June, in the last minute of a 2–2 away draw with RCD Espanyol, he became the youngest player ever to score in a La Liga match, aged 16 years, 11 months and 18 days; he also appeared in four UEFA Cup and one Champions League games for the side.

However, Nadal was not used very often at Villarreal, and served Segunda División loans at CD Numancia and Real Murcia CF in the second halves of 2003–04 and 2004–05, respectively. He spent the entire 2006–07 season at Hércules CF of the same league, and only made a total of 31 league appearances between the three teams.

Nadal lost all ties to Villarreal in January 2008, and signed with newly created side Granada 74 CF in the second tier. He moved again upon their relegation, joining Levante UD on a two-year contract.

Although rarely a starter in 2009–10, Nadal contributed three goals in 32 matches as the Valencians returned to the top flight after a two-year absence. In the following campaign, in which he was used almost exclusively as a winger, he went scoreless in 25 games in an eventual escape from relegation; on 15 May 2011, he was sent off for a late challenge on Roberto Soldado in a 0–0 away draw against Valencia CF which certified the team's permanence.

On 11 September 2011, the 25-year-old Nadal agreed to a short-term deal with Alqueries CF in the Valencian regional divisions. After retiring in 2018 at the age of 32, he returned to the Estadio de la Cerámica as match delegate following an invitation from his former teammate Javier Calleja who acted as the club's manager.

== International career ==
Nadal was part of Spain's under-17 squad that finished runners-up at the 2003 UEFA European Championship. Also that year, he played in the FIFA World Cup of the same age group, with the nation losing in the final to Brazil.
