= João Simões =

João Simões may refer to:

- João Simões Lopes Neto (1865-1916), Brazilian writer
- João Simões (footballer, born 1998), Portuguese football right-back
- João Simões (footballer, born 2007), Portuguese football midfielder
