= Navid Dayyani =

Danish footballer (born 1987)

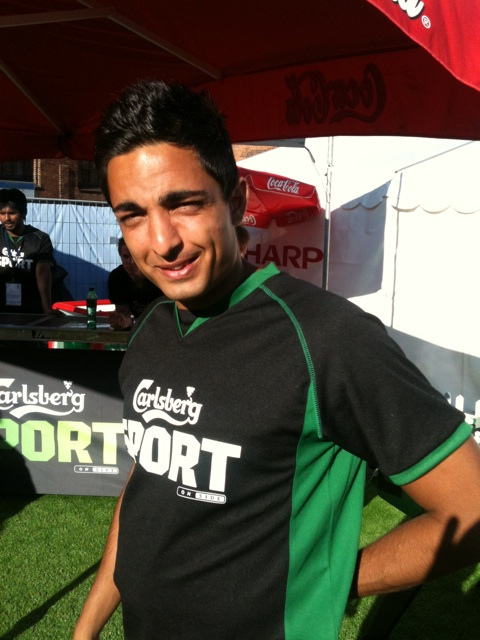
- Dayyani in 2011

Personal information
- Full name: Navid Fløe Dayyani
- Date of birth: 17 February 1987 (age 39)
- Place of birth: Denmark
- Position: Midfielder

Senior career*
Years	Team	Apps	(Gls)
2003–2007	AGF	17	(0)

International career
2002	Denmark U16	3	(0)
2003–2004	Denmark U17	17	(2)
2004–2005	Denmark U18	3	(0)
2005–2006	Denmark U19	5	(0)
- * Club domestic league appearances and goals

Navid Fløe Dayyani (born 17 February 1987) is a Danish former professional footballer who played as a midfielder. He made 17 appearances in the Danish Superliga for AGF before his career was ended prematurely by injury. He is the son of an Iranian father and a Danish mother.

== Club career ==
Dayyani progressed through the youth academy of AGF, signing a full-time contract as a teenager.

He made his debut in the Danish Superliga on 19 October 2003 at the age of 16 years and 244 days, becoming the youngest player to appear in the league at the time. He came on as a 67th-minute substitute for Kasper Kure in a 2–1 home defeat to Brøndby.

Dayyani was regarded as one of the club's promising young talents, with head coach Sören Åkeby at the time describing him as a player for the future, highlighting his physical development and composure in senior matches.

Between 2003 and 2006, Dayyani made 17 league appearances for AGF. His playing career was curtailed by persistent knee problems, and he retired from professional football in April 2007 at the age of twenty.

== International career ==
Dayyani represented Denmark at youth international level from under-16 to under-19, earning a total of 28 appearances and scoring two goals across the age groups.

== After football ==
After retiring from professional football, Dayyani moved into business and entrepreneurship. He has been involved in investment and company ownership, including activities in retail and technology-related businesses. In 2018, he became involved in the beauty industry and co-founded a hair salon in central Aarhus as part of plans to develop a wider salon chain.

Through a holding company based in Risskov, he has also been engaged in broader commercial investments, with the company reporting million-kroner profits in 2024.
