= Pedro Freitas =

Portuguese footballer

Personal information
- Full name: Pedro Miguel Sousa Freitas
- Date of birth: 31 October 1986 (age 40)
- Place of birth: Guimarães, Portugal
- Height: 1.86 m (6 ft 1 in)
- Position: Goalkeeper

Team information
- Current team: Berço SC
- Number: 1

Youth career
- 2002–2004: Vitória de Guimarães

Senior career*
Years	Team	Apps	(Gls)
2004–2006	Vitória de Guimarães	0	(0)
2006–2007	Maria da Fonte		
2007	Brito		
2008	Vilaverdense		
2006–2007	Maria da Fonte		
2009–2011	AD Oliveirense		
2011–2014	Fafe	60	(0)
2014–2016	Santa Clara	35	(0)
2016–2018	Vilaverdense	57	(0)
2018–2019	Juventude Pedras Salgadas	20	(0)
2019–2020	Fafe	19	(0)
2020–	Berço SC	10	(0)
Medal record
Men's football
Representing Portugal
UEFA European U17 Championship
Winner	2003 Portugal
- * Club domestic league appearances and goals as of 21:24, 25 January 2021 (UTC)

Pedro Miguel Sousa Freitas (born 31 October 1986) is a Portuguese footballer who plays for Berço SC as a goalkeeper.

== Career ==
On 26 July 2014, Freitas made his professional debut with Santa Clara in a 2014–15 Taça da Liga match against Olhanense, when he started and played the full game.
