= Christoph Saurer =

Austrian footballer

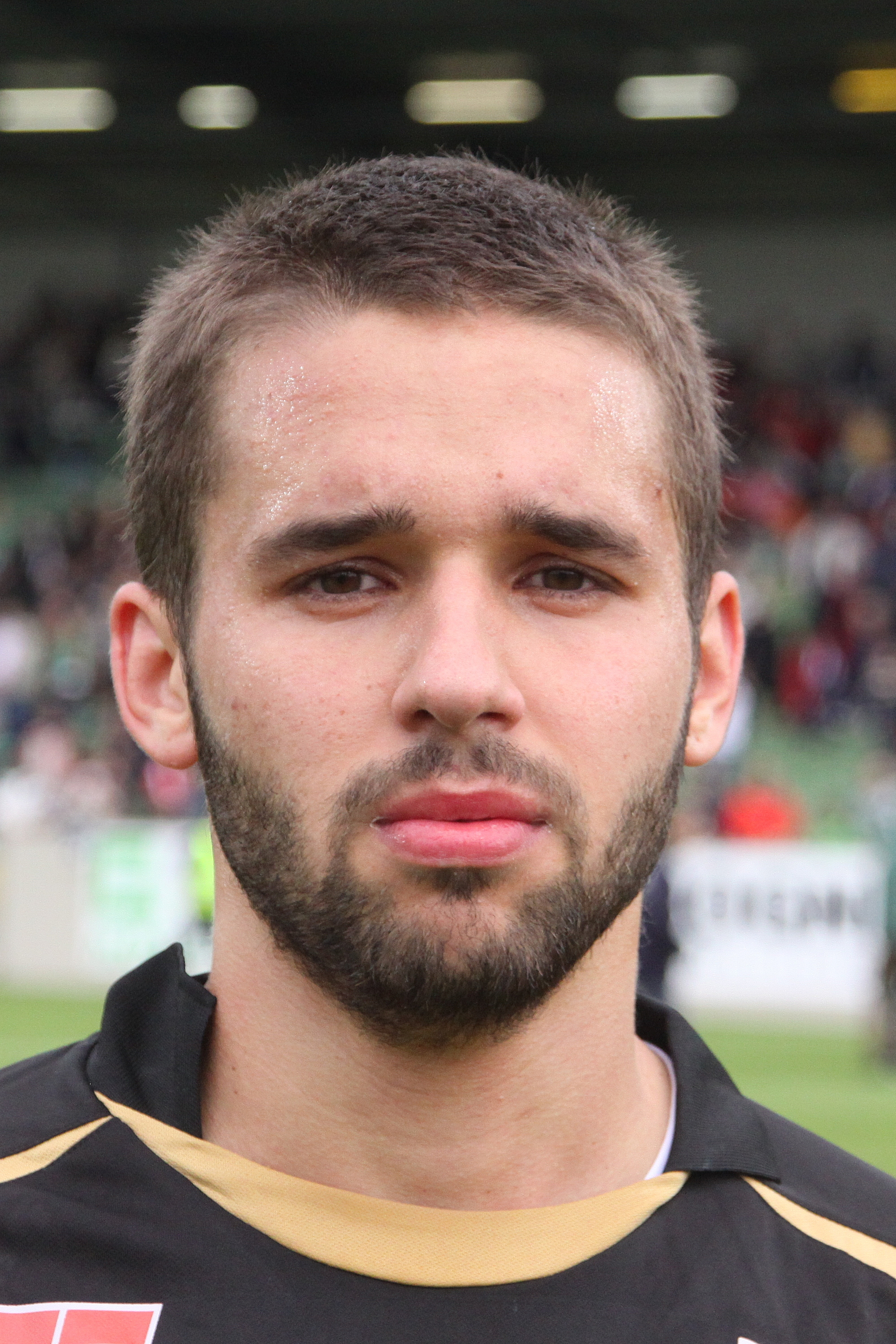

Personal information
- Full name: Christoph Saurer
- Date of birth: January 22, 1986 (age 40)
- Place of birth: Vienna, Austria
- Height: 1.75 m (5 ft 9 in)
- Position: Midfielder

Youth career
- KSV Ankerbrot
- 1996–2004: Austria Wien

Senior career*
Years	Team	Apps	(Gls)
2004–2007	Austria Wien	4	(0)
2007–2010	LASK Linz	95	(13)
2010–2012	Rapid Wien	37	(3)
2012	→ Wiener Neustadt (loan)	16	(1)
2012–2014	Wacker Innsbruck	34	(0)
2015	FC Pasching	10	(4)
2015–2016	Wiener Neustadt	24	(3)
2016	SC Mannsdorf	7	(0)
2017–	SC Pinkafeld	91	(27)

International career
2003	Austria U17	10	(2)
2005	Austria U19	3	(0)
2005–2008	Austria U21	14	(2)
2009	Austria	1	(0)
- * Club domestic league appearances and goals as of 01:09, 17 January 2021 (UTC)

Christoph Saurer (born 22 January 1986, in Vienna) is an Austrian footballer who plays for SC Pinkafeld. He has been capped for both the Austria national under-21 football team and the Austrian full international team.
