= Patrick Mayer (Austrian footballer) =

Austrian footballer

Personal information
- Full name: Patrick Daniel Mayer
- Date of birth: 11 August 1986 (age 40)
- Place of birth: Salzburg, Austria
- Height: 1.83 m (6 ft 0 in)
- Position: Forward

Team information
- Current team: USK Anif
- Number: 99

Youth career
- 1994–2001: SV Austria Salzburg
- 2002: FK Austria Wien
- 2002–2005: Vitesse Arnheim

Senior career*
Years	Team	Apps	(Gls)
2005–2009	SC Rheindorf Altach	59	(5)
2009–2010	SV Grödig	21	(20)
2011–	USK Anif	0	(0)

International career^{‡}
	Austria U-17	22	(10)
	Austria U-18	2	(1)
	Austria U-19	10	(6)
- * Club domestic league appearances and goals as of 8 March 2011 ‡ National team caps and goals as of 8 March 2011

Patrick Mayer (born 11 August 1986) is an Austrian football player currently playing for USK Anif.
