= Portugal national under-17 football team =

National association football team

Portugal Under-17
- Nickname: Selecção das Quinas
- Association: Portuguese Football Federation
- Confederation: UEFA (Europe)
- Head coach: João Santos
- Most caps: João Simões (39 caps)
- Top scorer: José Gomes (20 goals)
- FIFA code: POR
First colours	Second colours

First international
- Argentina 3–0 Portugal (Cuenca, Spain; 05 August 1995)

Biggest win
- Portugal 10–0 Kazakhstan (Aveiro, Portugal; 10 October 2018); Portugal 10–0 Liechtenstein (Oeiras, Portugal; 13 November 2024); Portugal 10–0 Liechtenstein (Loulé, Portugal; 12 November 2025)

Biggest defeat
- Portugal 0–5 Brazil (Tampere, Finland; 17 August 2003); Portugal 0–5 Germany (Algarve, Portugal; 9 February 2016)

World Cup
- Appearances: 4 (first in 1989)
- Best result: Champions (2025)

European Championship
- Appearances: 12 (first in 2002)
- Best result: Champions (2003, 2016, 2025)
Medal record
Men's football
FIFA U-17 World Cup
Gold medal – first place	2025 Qatar	Team
Bronze medal – third place	1989 Scotland	Team
UEFA European U-17 Championship
Gold medal – first place	2003 Portugal	Team
Gold medal – first place	2016 Azerbaijan	Team
Gold medal – first place	2025 Albania	Team
Silver medal – second place	2024 Cyprus	Team
Bronze medal – third place	2004 France	Team

The Portugal national under-17 football team represents Portugal in international football at this age level and is controlled by Federação Portuguesa de Futebol, the governing body for football in that nation.

== Competitive record ==
=== FIFA U-17 World Cup ===
Year	Round	G	W	D*	L	GF	GA
(China) 1985	Did not qualify						
(Canada) 1987	Did not qualify						
(Scotland) 1989	Third place	6	3	2	1	11	7
(Italy) 1991	Did not qualify						
(Japan) 1993	Did not qualify						
(Ecuador) 1995	Quarter-finals	4	1	0	3	5	8
(Egypt) 1997	Did not qualify						
(New Zealand) 1999	Did not qualify						
(Trinidad and Tobago) 2001	Did not qualify						
(Finland) 2003	Quarter-finals	4	1	1	2	11	18
(Peru) 2005	Did not qualify						
(South Korea) 2007	Did not qualify						
(Nigeria) 2009	Did not qualify						
(Mexico) 2011	Did not qualify						
(United Arab Emirates) 2013	Did not qualify						
(Chile) 2015	Did not qualify						
(India) 2017	Did not qualify						
(Brazil) 2019	Did not qualify						
(Indonesia) 2023	Did not qualify						
(Qatar) 2025	Champions	8	6	1	1	23	4
(Qatar) 2026	Did not qualify						
(Qatar) 2027	To be determined						
(Qatar) 2028	To be determined						
(Qatar) 2029	To be determined						
Total	4/24	22	11	4	7	50	37

=== UEFA European U-17 Championship ===
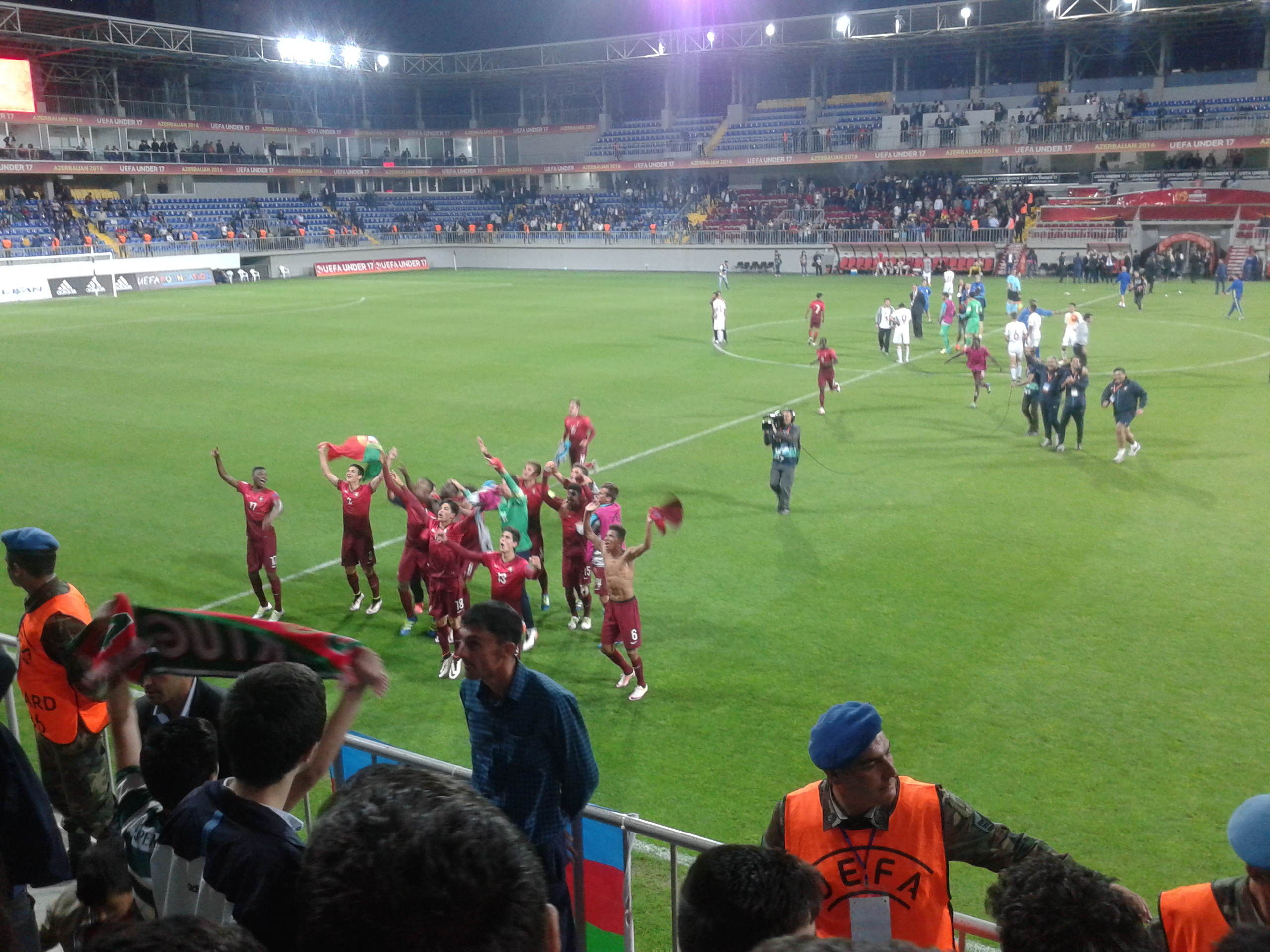
Portugal, champions of the 2016 UEFA European Under-17 Championship.

Year	Round	GP	Won	Drawn*	Lost	GF	GA
(Denmark) 2002	Group stage	3	1	0	2	2	4
(Portugal) 2003	Champions	5	4	1	0	10	5
(France) 2004	Third place	5	1	2	2	10	10
(Italy) 2005	did not qualify						
(Luxembourg) 2006	did not qualify						
(Belgium) 2007	did not qualify						
(Turkey) 2008	did not qualify						
(Germany) 2009	did not qualify						
(Liechtenstein) 2010	Group stage	3	1	0	2	3	3
(Serbia) 2011	did not qualify						
(Slovenia) 2012	did not qualify						
(Slovakia) 2013	did not qualify						
(Malta) 2014	Semi-finals	4	3	0	1	4	2
(Bulgaria) 2015	did not qualify						
(Azerbaijan) 2016	Champions	6	4	2	0	15	1
(Croatia) 2017	did not qualify						
(England) 2018	Group stage	3	1	1	1	4	1
(Republic of Ireland) 2019	Quarter finals	4	2	0	2	6	5
(Estonia) ~~2020~~	Cancelled due to COVID-19 pandemic						
(Cyprus) ~~2021~~	Cancelled due to COVID-19 pandemic						
(Israel) 2022	Semi-finals	5	3	1	1	14	9
(Hungary) 2023	Group stage	3	1	1	1	3	6
(Cyprus) 2024	Runners-up	6	4	0	2	12	10
(Albania) 2025	Champions	5	3	2	0	11	3
(Estonia) 2026	Did not qualify						
(Latvia) 2027	To be determined						
(Lithuania) 2028	To be determined						
(Moldova) 2029	To be determined						
Total:12/22	3 Titles	52	28	10	14	94	59

*Denotes draws include knockout matches decided on penalty kicks.

- Gold background color indicates first-place finish. Silver background color indicates second-place finish. Bronze background color indicates third-place finish.

== Recent results ==
=== 2025 ===
12 November 2025 2026 UEFA U-17 Euro qualification	Portugal	10–0	Liechtenstein	Estádio Algarve, Faro-Loulé
16:00	Ribeiro 15', 18', 47'; Constantino 61'; Fawler 65', 90+2'; Batista 71'; Semedo 74'; Ferreirinha 76', 81'	Report		Attendance: 85; Referee: Gal Levi (Israel)

15 November 2025 2026 UEFA U-17 Euro qualification	Portugal	1–1	Wales	Estádio de São Luís, Faro
15:00	Semedo 62'	Report	Donczew 83'	Attendance: 216; Referee: Daniel Higraff (Norway)

18 November 2025 2026 UEFA U-17 Euro qualification	Slovenia	2–4	Portugal	Estádio Algarve, Faro-Loulé
16:00	Bogatinov 58'; Ferreira 71' (o.g.)	Report	Ferreirinha 28', 45+2'; Tomás 30'; Guerra 47'	Attendance: 146; Referee: Seth Galia (Gibraltar)

=== 2026 ===
25 March 2026 2026 UEFA U-17 Euro qualification	Italy	3–2	Portugal	Stadio Pietro Barbetti, Gubbio
15:00	Perillo 46'; Okon 51'; Landi 75'	Report	Guerra 11'; Ferreirinha 15'	Referee: Lasse Læbel Graagaard (Denmark)

28 March 2026 2026 UEFA U-17 Euro qualification	Portugal	0–1	Romania	Carlo Angelo Luzi, Gualdo Tadino
12:00		Report	Tripon 34'	Referee: Oguzhan Çakir (Turkey)

31 March 2026 2026 UEFA U-17 Euro qualification	Portugal	1–2	Iceland	Stadio Renato Curi, Perugia
18:00	Guerra 48'	Report	Ingólfsson 40'; Guðjónsson 90+2'	Referee: Duncan Nicolson (Scotland)

== Players ==
=== Current squad ===
The following players were named in the squad for the 2026 UEFA European Under-17 Championship qualification matches against Italy, Romania and Iceland on 25, 28 and 31 March 2026; respectively in Italy.

Caps and goals correct as of 28 March 2026, after the match against Romania.

No.	Pos.	Player	Date of birth (age)	Caps	Goals	Club
1	GK	André Marques	3 October 2010 (age 16)	1	0	(Portuguese Football Federation) Braga
12	GK	Pippo Gaidão	6 March 2009 (age 17)	1	0	(Portuguese Football Federation) Benfica
3	DF	Isaac Badu	5 December 2009 (age 16)	2	0	(The Football Association) Chelsea
4	DF	Tomás Ferreira	30 January 2009 (age 17)	1	0	(Portuguese Football Federation) Benfica
5	DF	Ricardo Batista	5 March 2009 (age 17)	2	0	(Portuguese Football Federation) Benfica
13	DF	Kilian Ferreira	18 August 2009 (age 17)	1	0	(Royal Spanish Football Federation) Calavera
14	DF	Rodrigo Silva	17 December 2009 (age 16)	2	0	(Portuguese Football Federation) Braga
15	DF	Francisco Cabeçana	29 January 2009 (age 17)	1	0	(Portuguese Football Federation) Sporting CP
6	MF	Hugo Gomes	26 January 2009 (age 17)	2	0	(Portuguese Football Federation) Benfica
8	MF	Rúben Correia	6 February 2009 (age 17)	2	0	(Portuguese Football Federation) Benfica
10	MF	Nélio Batista	14 January 2009 (age 17)	2	0	(Portuguese Football Federation) Marítimo
16	MF	Rodrigo Gonçalves	12 February 2009 (age 17)	0	0	(Portuguese Football Federation) Porto
17	MF	João Silva	3 December 2009 (age 16)	2	0	(Portuguese Football Federation) Vitória de Guimarães
2	FW	Estefânio	5 September 2009 (age 17)	2	0	(Portuguese Football Federation) Sporting CP
7	FW	Duarte Tomás	20 January 2009 (age 17)	1	0	(Portuguese Football Federation) Sporting CP
9	FW	Afonso Ferreirinha	16 January 2009 (age 17)	2	1	(Portuguese Football Federation) Benfica
11	FW	Vlad	19 March 2009 (age 17)	2	0	(Portuguese Football Federation) Paços de Ferreira
18	FW	Gustavo Guerra	31 March 2009 (age 17)	2	1	(Portuguese Football Federation) Porto
19	FW	Tiago Rodrigues	25 January 2009 (age 17)	2	0	(Portuguese Football Federation) Benfica
20	FW	Sandro Ferreira	29 May 2009 (age 17)	2	0	(Portuguese Football Federation) Sporting CP

=== Recent call-ups ===
The following players have also been called up to the squad within the last twelve months and remain eligible for selection.

Pos.	Player	Date of birth (age)	Caps	Goals	Club	Latest call-up
FW	Bernardo Nunes	15 May 2009 (age 17)	0	0	(Portugal) Benfica	v. Serbia, 25 March 2025
FW	Cristiano Ronaldo Jr.	17 June 2010 (age 16)	0	0	(Saudi Arabia) Al-Nassr FC	

== Former squads ==
FIFA U-17 World Championship

- 1995 FIFA U-17 World Championship squads - Portugal
- 1989 FIFA U-16 World Championship squads - Portugal
- 2003 FIFA U-17 World Championship squads - Portugal
- 2025 FIFA U-17 World Cup squads - Portugal - (1st title)

UEFA European Under-17

- 2002 UEFA European Under-17 Football Championship squads - Portugal
- 2003 UEFA European Under-17 Football Championship squads - Portugal
- 2004 UEFA European Under-17 Football Championship squads - Portugal
- 2010 UEFA European Under-17 Football Championship squads - Portugal
- 2014 UEFA European Under-17 Football Championship squads - Portugal
- 2016 UEFA European Under-17 Football Championship squads - Portugal
- 2018 UEFA European Under-17 Football Championship squads - Portugal
- 2019 UEFA European Under-17 Football Championship squads - Portugal
- 2022 UEFA European Under-17 Football Championship squads - Portugal
- 2023 UEFA European Under-17 Football Championship squads - Portugal

=== Most appearances ===
#	Name	Caps	Goals	First cap	Latest cap
1	João Simões	39	5	September 22, 2022	June 2, 2024
2	Hélder Barbosa	37	3	July 16, 2002	May 15, 2004
3	Bruno Gama	34	11	February 11, 2003	May 15, 2004

=== Most goals ===
#	Name	Goals	Caps	First cap	Latest cap
1	José Gomes	20	26	September 19, 2014	May 21, 2016
2	Pipo	13	16	July 29. 2008	March 27, 2009
3	Bruno Gama	11	34	February 11, 2003	May 15, 2004

== Head-to-head record ==
The following table shows Portugal's head-to-head record in the FIFA U-17 World Cup.

Opponent	Pld	W	D	L	GF	GA	GD	Win %
Argentina	2	1	0	1	2	4	−2	50.00
Bahrain	1	1	0	0	3	0	+3	100.00
Brazil	1	0	0	1	0	5	−5	0.00
Cameroon	1	0	1	0	5	5	+0	0.00
Colombia	1	1	0	0	3	2	+1	100.00
Costa Rica	1	1	0	0	3	0	+3	100.00
Ghana	1	0	0	1	0	2	−2	0.00
Guinea	2	0	1	1	3	4	−1	0.00
Saudi Arabia	1	0	1	0	2	2	+0	0.00
Scotland	1	0	0	1	0	1	−1	0.00
Spain	1	0	0	1	2	5	−3	0.00
Yemen	1	1	0	0	4	3	+1	100.00
Total	14	5	3	6	27	33	−6	35.71
