= Anders Qvist =

Danish footballer (born 1987)

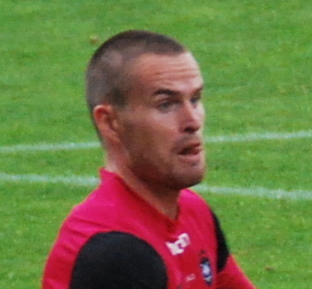
- Anders Qvist in August 2011

Personal information
- Full name: Anders Bjerring Qvist
- Date of birth: July 31, 1987 (age 39)
- Place of birth: Denmark
- Height: 1.85 m (6 ft 1 in)
- Position: Defender

Team information
- Current team: Brønshøj BK
- Number: 3

Youth career
- FB

Senior career*
Years	Team	Apps	(Gls)
2004–2006	B.93		
2006–2008	FC Nordsjælland	8	(0)
2007–2008	→ Fremad Amager (loan)	8	(0)
2008–2009	FC Amager	13	(0)
2009	FC Copenhagen II	?	(?)
2009–2010	Kristianstads FF	?	(?)
2010	FC Copenhagen II	?	(?)
2010–2018	FC Roskilde	107	(2)
2019–	Brønshøj BK	0	(0)

International career
2002–2004	Denmark U-17	28	(0)
2002	Denmark U-16	3	(1)
2004	Denmark U-18	3	(0)
2005–2006	Denmark U-19	15	(0)
2006	Denmark U-20	3	(0)
2007	Denmark U-21	1	(0)
- * Club domestic league appearances and goals as of 12 April 2018

Anders Bjerring Qvist (born 31 July 1987) is a Danish professional football defender, who currently is playing at Brønshøj BK. He played eight games for FC Nordsjælland during the Danish Superliga 2006-07 season.
