= Mor Maman (footballer) =

Israeli footballer

Mor Maman מור ממן
Personal information
- Date of birth: February 2, 1986 (age 40)
- Place of birth: Israel
- Height: 1.77 m (5 ft 9 1/2 in)
- Position: Defender

Team information
- Current team: Maccabi Kafr Kanna

Youth career
- Maccabi Haifa

Senior career*
Years	Team	Apps	(Gls)
2003–2007	Maccabi Haifa		
2005	→ Bnei Sakhnin (loan)		
2006	→ Hapoel Haifa (loan)		
2008	Hapoel Nazareth Illit	19	(0)
2008–2009	Maccabi Ironi Tirat HaCarmel	14	(0)
2009	Maccabi Kafr Kanna	2	(0)
2010	Hapoel Bnei Jadeidi	16	(0)
2010–2014	Maccabi Kafr Kanna	76	(0)
2014	→ Hapoel Bnei Nujeidat (loan)	1	(1)
2014	→ Hapoel Bu'eine (loan)	13	(3)
2014–2018	Ahi Bir al-Maksur	75	(17)
2015	→ Ahi Acre (loan)	3	(0)

International career^{‡}
2002–2003	Israel U17	12	(0)
2004–2005	Israel U18	4	(0)
2004–2005	Israel U19	9	(0)
- * Club domestic league appearances and goals as of December 19, 2010 ‡ National team caps and goals as of December 19, 2010

Mor Maman (Hebrew: מור ממן; born February 2, 1986) is an Israeli footballer who plays for Maccabi Kafr Kanna. Maman made his professional debut for Maccabi Haifa in a Toto Cup match against Hapoel Ramat Gan on September 16, 2003. He later played for Bnei Sakhnin, Hapoel Haifa, Hapoel Nazareth Illit, Maccabi Ironi Tirat HaCarmel, Maccabi Kafr Kanna and Hapoel Bnei Jadeidi. At international level, Maman was capped at levels from under-17 to under-19.
