= Mads Torry =

Danish footballer (born 1986)

Personal information
- Full name: Mads Torry Lindeneg
- Date of birth: 13 May 1986 (age 40)
- Place of birth: Copenhagen, Denmark
- Height: 1.74 m (5 ft 9 in)
- Position: Center forward

Team information
- Current team: Vejle Boldklub
- Number: 30

Youth career
- Vanløse IF
- Kjøbenhavns Boldklub

Senior career*
Years	Team	Apps	(Gls)
2006–2008 2008–2009 2009–2010 2010–2013	Vejle Boldklub; Boldklubberne Glostrup Albertslund; Kjøbenhavns Boldklub Vanløse IF	1	(0)

International career^{‡}
2001	Denmark U-16	3	(0)
2002–03	Denmark U-17	18	(8)
2003–04	Denmark U-18	4	(0)
2004–05	Denmark U-19	11	(2)
- * Club domestic league appearances and goals as of 12 January 2007 ‡ National team caps and goals as of 12 January 2007

Mads Torry Lindeneg (born 13 May 1986) is a former professional Danish football player, who retired in the summer of 2013 while playing for Vanløse IF. In July 2013 he was confirmed as new sports director at the same club.
