= 2017 UEFA European Under-17 Championship qualification =

Tournament details
- Dates: Qualifying round: 16 September – 6 November 2016; Elite round: 10–28 March 2017
- Teams: 53 (from 1 confederation)

Tournament statistics
- Matches played: 126
- Goals scored: 397 (3.15 per match)
- Top scorer: (Republic of Ireland) Aaron Connolly (7 goals)

The 2017 UEFA European Under-17 Championship qualifying competition was a men's under-17 football competition that determined the fifteen teams joining the automatically qualified hosts Croatia in the 2017 UEFA European Under-17 Championship final tournament.

A total of 53 UEFA member national teams entered the qualifying competition. Players born on or after 1 January 2000 are eligible to participate. Each match has a duration of 80 minutes, consisting of two halves of 40 minutes with a 15-minute half-time.

== Format ==
The qualifying competition consists of two rounds:

- Qualifying round: Apart from Germany, which receive a bye to the elite round as the team with the highest seeding coefficient, the remaining 52 teams are drawn into 13 groups of four teams. Each group is played in single round-robin format at one of the teams selected as hosts after the draw. The 13 group winners, the 13 runners-up, and the five third-placed teams with the best record against the first and second-placed teams in their group advance to the elite round.
- Elite round: The 32 teams are drawn into eight groups of four teams. Each group is played in single round-robin format at one of the teams selected as hosts after the draw. The eight group winners and the seven runners-up with the best record against the first and third-placed teams in their group qualify for the final tournament.

=== Tiebreakers ===
The teams are ranked according to points (3 points for a win, 1 point for a draw, 0 points for a loss). If two or more teams are equal on points on completion of a mini-tournament, the following tie-breaking criteria are applied, in the order given, to determine the rankings (Regulations Articles 14.01 and 14.02):

1. Higher number of points obtained in the mini-tournament matches played among the teams in question;
2. Superior goal difference resulting from the mini-tournament matches played among the teams in question;
3. Higher number of goals scored in the mini-tournament matches played among the teams in question;
4. If, after having applied criteria 1 to 3, teams still have an equal ranking, criteria 1 to 3 are reapplied exclusively to the mini-tournament matches between the teams in question to determine their final rankings. If this procedure does not lead to a decision, criteria 5 to 9 apply;
5. Superior goal difference in all mini-tournament matches;
6. Higher number of goals scored in all mini-tournament matches;
7. If only two teams have the same number of points, and they are tied according to criteria 1 to 6 after having met in the last round of the mini-tournament, their rankings are determined by a penalty shoot-out (not used if more than two teams have the same number of points, or if their rankings are not relevant for qualification for the next stage).
8. Lower disciplinary points total based only on yellow and red cards received in the mini-tournament matches (red card = 3 points, yellow card = 1 point, expulsion for two yellow cards in one match = 3 points);
9. Higher position in the coefficient ranking list used for the qualifying round draw;
10. Drawing of lots.

To determine the five best third-placed teams from the qualifying round and the seven best runners-up from the elite round, the results against the teams in fourth place are discarded. The following criteria are applied (Regulations Articles 15.01, 15.02 and 15.03):

1. Higher number of points;
2. Superior goal difference;
3. Higher number of goals scored;
4. Lower disciplinary points total based only on yellow and red cards received (red card = 3 points, yellow card = 1 point, expulsion for two yellow cards in one match = 3 points);
5. Higher position in the coefficient ranking list used for the qualifying round draw;
6. Drawing of lots.

== Qualifying round ==
=== Draw ===
The draw for the qualifying round was held on 3 December 2015, 09:00 CET (UTC+1), at the UEFA headquarters in Nyon, Switzerland.

The teams were seeded according to their coefficient ranking, calculated based on the following:

- 2013 UEFA European Under-17 Championship final tournament and qualifying competition (qualifying round and elite round)
- 2014 UEFA European Under-17 Championship final tournament and qualifying competition (qualifying round and elite round)
- 2015 UEFA European Under-17 Championship final tournament and qualifying competition (qualifying round and elite round)

Each group contained two teams from Pot A and two teams from Pot B. For political reasons, Spain and Gibraltar (due to the disputed status of Gibraltar), Armenia and Azerbaijan (due to the disputed status of Nagorno-Karabakh), as well as Russia and Ukraine (due to the Russian military intervention in Ukraine), could not be drawn in the same group.

Final tournament hosts: Team / Coeff / Rank; **Croatia** / 8.500 / —	Bye to elite round: Team / Coeff / Rank; **Germany** / 12.667 / 1

Teams entering qualifying round

Pot A
Team	Coeff	Rank
**England**	11.667	2
**Netherlands**	9.667	3
**Portugal**	9.333	4
**Italy**	9.167	5
**Russia**	9.167	6
**France**	8.667	7
**Czech Republic**	8.500	8
**Austria**	8.500	9
**Spain**	8.167	10
**Poland**	8.000	11
**Scotland**	8.000	12
**Serbia**	7.667	13
**Switzerland**	7.667	14
**Belgium**	6.833	15
**Republic of Ireland**	6.833	16
**Ukraine**	6.167	17
**Sweden**	6.000	18
**Norway**	5.833	19
Georgia	5.667	20
**Greece**	5.500	21
**Slovenia**	5.333	22
**Hungary**	5.167	23
**Bosnia and Herzegovina**	5.000	24
**Belarus**	4.967	25
**Israel**	4.833	26
**Slovakia**	4.333	27

Pot B
Team	Coeff	Rank
**Turkey**	4.333	28
Iceland	4.167	29
Bulgaria	4.000	30
Romania	4.000	31
Northern Ireland	3.833	32
Denmark	3.333	33
Wales	3.167	34
Albania	3.167	35
Estonia	3.167	36
**Finland**	3.133	37
Latvia	3.000	38
Moldova	2.667	39
**Cyprus**	2.667	40
**Faroe Islands**	1.667	41
Azerbaijan	1.500	42
Luxembourg	1.333	43
Macedonia	1.333	44
**Armenia**	1.000	45
Lithuania	1.000	46
**Montenegro**	0.333	47
Andorra	0.333	48
San Marino	0.333	49
Gibraltar	0.333	50
Malta	0.000	51
Liechtenstein	0.000	52
Kazakhstan	0.000	53

Notes

- Teams marked in **bold** have qualified for the final tournament.

=== Groups ===
The qualifying round must be played between 1 July and mid-November 2016.

Times up to 29 October 2016 are CEST (UTC+2), thereafter times are CET (UTC+1).

==== Group 1 ====
Pos	Team	Pld	W	D	L	GF	GA	GD	Pts	Qualification
1	Russia	3	3	0	0	8	1	+7	**9**	Elite round
2	Bosnia and Herzegovina	3	2	0	1	5	2	+3	**6**	Elite round
3	Latvia	3	1	0	2	2	4	−2	**3**	
4	Moldova (H)	3	0	0	3	0	8	−8	**0**	

Source: UEFA
Rules for classification: Qualification tiebreakers
(H) Hosts
23 September 2016
15:00

Bosnia and Herzegovina	3–0	Latvia
Lušņickis 15' (o.g.); Šikanjić 49'; Veips 62' (o.g.)	Report

CSR Orhei, Orhei
Attendance: 50
Referee: Anders Poulsen (Denmark)
23 September 2016
15:00

Moldova	0–5	Russia
	Report	Mironov 2'; Ageyev 31', 63'; Kolesnichenko 58'; Karapuzov 72'

Zimbru-2 Stadium, Chișinău
Attendance: 300
Referee: Zbyněk Proske (Czech Republic)

25 September 2016
15:00

Bosnia and Herzegovina	1–0	Moldova
Omerović 28'	Report

Zimbru-2 Stadium, Chișinău
Attendance: 150
Referee: Dominik Ouschan (Austria)
25 September 2016
15:00

Russia	1–0	Latvia
Kolesnichenko 6'	Report

CSR Orhei, Orhei
Attendance: 100
Referee: Anders Poulsen (Denmark)

28 September 2016
15:00

Russia	2–1	Bosnia and Herzegovina
Lopatin 13'; Kolesnichenko 49'	Report	Šikanjić 78'

CSR Orhei, Orhei
Attendance: 100
Referee: Dominik Ouschan (Austria)
28 September 2016
15:00

Latvia	2–0	Moldova
Tālbergs 4'; Toņiševs 79'	Report

Zimbru-2 Stadium, Chișinău
Attendance: 250
Referee: Zbyněk Proske (Czech Republic)

==== Group 2 ====
Pos	Team	Pld	W	D	L	GF	GA	GD	Pts	Qualification
1	Republic of Ireland	3	3	0	0	9	2	+7	**9**	Elite round
2	Greece	3	2	0	1	4	1	+3	**6**	Elite round
3	Kazakhstan	3	1	0	2	3	4	−1	**3**	
4	Andorra (H)	3	0	0	3	1	10	−9	**0**	

Source: UEFA
Rules for classification: Qualification tiebreakers
(H) Hosts
15 October 2016
11:30

Kazakhstan	0–1	Greece
	Report	Tsirigotis 55'

Centre d'Entrenament FAF, Andorra la Vella
Referee: Denis Scherbakov (Belarus)
15 October 2016
16:00

Republic of Ireland	5–1	Andorra
Roache 37', 55'; Peppard 53'; Idah 62'; Connolly 79'	Report	Torres 78'

Estadi Comunal, Andorra la Vella
Referee: Alain Durieux (Luxembourg)

17 October 2016
11:30

Republic of Ireland	3–1	Kazakhstan
Connolly 49'; Idah 54', 80+3' (pen.)	Report	Kairkenov 55'

Centre d'Entrenament FAF, Andorra la Vella
Referee: Alain Durieux (Luxembourg)
17 October 2016
16:00

Greece	3–0	Andorra
Meliopoulos 8'; Gkargkalatzidis 13', 52' (pen.)	Report

Estadi Comunal, Andorra la Vella
Referee: Tomasz Musiał (Poland)

20 October 2016
12:00

Greece	0–1	Republic of Ireland
	Report	Connolly 21'

Centre d'Entrenament FAF, Andorra la Vella
Referee: Tomasz Musiał (Poland)
20 October 2016
12:00

Andorra	0–2	Kazakhstan
	Report	Zhakipbayev 16' (pen.); Seidakhmet 24'

Estadi Comunal, Andorra la Vella
Referee: Denis Scherbakov (Belarus)

==== Group 3 ====
Pos	Team	Pld	W	D	L	GF	GA	GD	Pts	Qualification
1	Switzerland	3	2	1	0	8	4	+4	**7**	Elite round
2	Faroe Islands	3	1	1	1	4	5	−1	**4 (Note: Ranked on head-to-head points: Faroe Islands 3, Czech Republic 0.)**	Elite round
3	Czech Republic	3	1	1	1	5	5	0	**4**	Elite round
4	Luxembourg (H)	3	0	1	2	3	6	−3	**1**	

Source: UEFA
Rules for classification: Qualification tiebreakers
(H) Hosts
Notes:
21 October 2016
19:00

Switzerland	2–1	Luxembourg
Del Campo 60'; Burkart 68'	Report	Delgado 34'

Stade Émile Mayrisch, Esch-sur-Alzette
Referee: Georgios Kominis (Greece)
21 October 2016
19:00

Faroe Islands	2–0	Czech Republic
Giessing 2'; Løkin 45'	Report

Terrain Poetz, Wiltz
Referee: Aleksandrs Anufrijevs (Latvia)

23 October 2016
18:30

Switzerland	3–0	Faroe Islands
Gonzalez 6'; Burkart 29'; Okafor 56'	Report

Stade Jos Haupert, Niederkorn
Referee: Vilhjálmur Þórarinsson (Iceland)
23 October 2016
18:30

Czech Republic	2–0	Luxembourg
Šilhan 25'; Korac 64' (o.g.)	Report

Terrain Poetz, Wiltz
Referee: Aleksandrs Anufrijevs (Latvia)

26 October 2016
19:00

Czech Republic	3–3	Switzerland
Šilhan 30', 34' (pen.); Macháček 65'	Report	Gonzalez 37'; Burkart 63'; Suter 80+3'

Stade Émile Mayrisch, Esch-sur-Alzette
Referee: Georgios Kominis (Greece)
26 October 2016
19:00

Luxembourg	2–2	Faroe Islands
Schaus 66', 73' (pen.)	Report	Jacobsen 40+1', 57'

Stade Jos Haupert, Niederkorn
Referee: Vilhjálmur Þórarinsson (Iceland)

==== Group 4 ====
Pos	Team	Pld	W	D	L	GF	GA	GD	Pts	Qualification
1	Italy (H)	3	2	1	0	3	0	+3	**7**	Elite round
2	Serbia	3	2	0	1	5	3	+2	**6**	Elite round
3	Macedonia	3	1	1	1	3	4	−1	**4**	
4	Albania	3	0	0	3	1	5	−4	**0**	

Source: UEFA
Rules for classification: Qualification tiebreakers
(H) Hosts
26 October 2016
11:00

Serbia	3–1	Macedonia
Gavrić 19'; Stuparević 54', 69'	Report	Fazlagikj 80' (pen.)

Stadio Bruno Bucci, Russi
Referee: Fábio Veríssimo (Portugal)
26 October 2016
15:00

Albania	0–1	Italy
	Report	Merola 62'

Stadio Bruno Benelli, Ravenna
Referee: Eitan Shmuelevitz (Israel)

28 October 2016
11:00

Serbia	2–0	Albania
Djerlek 5' (pen.); Bosić 13'	Report

Stadio Bruno Bucci, Russi
Referee: Bryn Markham-Jones (Wales)
28 October 2016
14:45

Italy	0–0	Macedonia
	Report

Stadio Tullo Morgagni, Forlì
Referee: Fábio Veríssimo (Portugal)

31 October 2016
15:00

Italy	2–0	Serbia
Merola 52'; Biancu 68'	Report

Stadio Bruno Benelli, Ravenna
Referee: Eitan Shmuelevitz (Israel)
31 October 2016
15:00

Macedonia	2–1	Albania
Kolevski 54'; Stratorski 63'	Report	Bullari 52'

Stadio Tullo Morgagni, Forlì
Referee: Bryn Markham-Jones (Wales)

==== Group 5 ====
Pos	Team	Pld	W	D	L	GF	GA	GD	Pts	Qualification
1	France	3	2	1	0	10	2	+8	**7**	Elite round
2	Slovenia (H)	3	1	2	0	7	4	+3	**5**	Elite round
3	Montenegro	3	1	1	1	5	5	0	**4**	Elite round
4	Estonia	3	0	0	3	2	13	−11	**0**	

Source: UEFA
Rules for classification: Qualification tiebreakers
(H) Hosts
20 October 2016
15:00

Slovenia	4–1	Estonia
Prelec 20', 70'; Svetlin 33'; Schweiger 80+4'	Report	Soomre 77'

NNC Brdo, Kranj
Referee: Alan Mario Sant (Malta)
20 October 2016
16:00

Montenegro	1–2	France
Pešukić 43'	Report	Adli 49', 60'

Domžale Sports Park, Domžale
Referee: Anastasios Papapetrou (Greece)

22 October 2016
11:00

France	7–0	Estonia
Pau 8', 28' (pen.); Caqueret 13'; Nlandu 49'; Tattevin 61'; Adli 79', 80+2'	Report

NNC Brdo, Kranj
Referee: Anastasios Papapetrou (Greece)
22 October 2016
15:00

Slovenia	2–2	Montenegro
Jakupovič 46' (pen.); Kurtovič 55'	Report	N. Krsotvić 67'; Rakonjac 77'

NNC Brdo, Kranj
Referee: Giorgi Kruashvili (Georgia)

25 October 2016
15:00

France	1–1	Slovenia
Gouiri 10'	Report	Kolobarić 49'

NNC Brdo, Kranj
Referee: Alan Mario Sant (Malta)
25 October 2016
15:00

Estonia	1–2	Montenegro
Piht 49'	Report	Grubac 31'; Rakonjac 80+1' (pen.)

Stanko Mlakar Stadium, Kranj
Referee: Giorgi Kruashvili (Georgia)

==== Group 6 ====
Pos	Team	Pld	W	D	L	GF	GA	GD	Pts	Qualification
1	England	3	3	0	0	8	2	+6	**9**	Elite round
2	Austria	3	2	0	1	7	5	+2	**6**	Elite round
3	Azerbaijan	3	1	0	2	2	5	−3	**3**	
4	Romania (H)	3	0	0	3	1	6	−5	**0**	

Source: UEFA
Rules for classification: Qualification tiebreakers
(H) Hosts
25 October 2016
14:00

Romania	1–2	Austria
Ilie 20'	Report	Krienzer 33'; Manolache 43' (o.g.)

Stadionul Buftea, Buftea
Referee: Nenad Djokić (Serbia)
25 October 2016
18:00

England	2–0	Azerbaijan
Gomes 16'; Sancho 23'	Report

Stadionul Buftea, Buftea
Referee: Fyodor Zammit (Malta)

27 October 2016
14:00

England	3–0	Romania
Foden 2', 13'; Sancho 68' (pen.)	Report

Stadionul Buftea, Buftea
Referee: Fyodor Zammit (Malta)
27 October 2016
18:00

Austria	3–1	Azerbaijan
Aganovic 3'; Schmid 60'; Wunsch 74'	Report	Sadikhov 23'

Stadionul Buftea, Buftea
Referee: Petur Reinert (Faroe Islands)

30 October 2016
14:00

Austria	2–3	England
Ballo 28', 78' (pen.)	Report	Gibson 39'; Loader 44'; Brewster 65' (pen.)

Stadionul Anghel Iordănescu, Voluntari
Referee: Nenad Djokić (Serbia)
30 October 2016
14:00

Azerbaijan	1–0	Romania
Sadikhov 29'	Report

Stadionul Buftea, Buftea
Referee: Petur Reinert (Faroe Islands)

==== Group 7 ====
Pos	Team	Pld	W	D	L	GF	GA	GD	Pts	Qualification
1	Netherlands	3	3	0	0	15	0	+15	**9**	Elite round
2	Hungary (H)	3	2	0	1	6	5	+1	**6**	Elite round
3	Denmark	3	1	0	2	12	5	+7	**3**	
4	Liechtenstein	3	0	0	3	0	23	−23	**0**	

Source: UEFA
Rules for classification: Qualification tiebreakers
(H) Hosts
28 September 2016
16:00

Hungary	3–0	Liechtenstein
Csoboth 20', 58'; Winkler 44'	Report

Globall Football Park, Telki
Referee: Alexandru Tean (Moldova)
28 September 2016
16:00

Denmark	0–2	Netherlands
	Report	Familio-Castillo 32' (pen.); Boadu 51'

Városi Stadion, Dabas
Referee: Edin Jakupović (Bosnia and Herzegovina)

30 September 2016
16:00

Hungary	3–1	Denmark
Szoboszlai 36' (pen.); Timári 64'; Csoboth 72' (pen.)	Report	Jensen 24'

Városi Stadion, Csákvár
Referee: Mikhail Vilkov (Russia)
30 September 2016
16:00

Netherlands	9–0	Liechtenstein
Buitink 3', 18'; Van Hoeven 12', 68'; Familio-Castillo 17'; Geertruida 49', 67'; Beck 51' (o.g.); Redan 80'	Report

Városi Stadion, Dabas
Referee: Alexandru Tean (Moldova)

3 October 2016
15:00

Netherlands	4–0	Hungary
Aboukhlal 8'; Familio-Castillo 28' (pen.); Redan 43'; Boadu 52'	Report

Városi Stadion, Dabas
Referee: Edin Jakupović (Bosnia and Herzegovina)
3 October 2016
15:00

Liechtenstein	0–11	Denmark
	Report	Nartey 2'; Rothmann 7'; Tue 12', 13', 32', 41'; Jensen 26', 64'; Jepsen 30'; Kaastrup 57'; Clement 80+2'

Városi Stadion, Csákvár
Referee: Mikhail Vilkov (Russia)

==== Group 8 ====
Pos	Team	Pld	W	D	L	GF	GA	GD	Pts	Qualification
1	Sweden	3	3	0	0	12	1	+11	**9**	Elite round
2	Finland (H)	3	2	0	1	3	5	−2	**6**	Elite round
3	Bulgaria	3	1	0	2	2	4	−2	**3**	
4	Georgia	3	0	0	3	0	7	−7	**0**	

Source: UEFA
Rules for classification: Qualification tiebreakers
(H) Hosts
28 September 2016
13:00

Georgia	0–1	Bulgaria
	Report	Gruev 35' (pen.)

Kempeleen Urheilukeskus, Kempele
Referee: Dimitrios Massias (Cyprus)
28 September 2016
17:30

Finland	0–5	Sweden
	Report	Finndell 27' (pen.); Mawana 66', 69' (pen.), 77'; Stålheden 73'

Raatti Stadium, Oulu
Referee: Mario Zebec (Croatia)

30 September 2016
13:00

Sweden	3–1	Bulgaria
Finndell 46'; Crona 50'; Mawana 69'	Report	Mihaylov 65'

Raahen Urheilupuisto, Raahe
Referee: Dimitrios Massias (Cyprus)
30 September 2016
17:30

Georgia	0–2	Finland
	Report	Tolonen 71'; Oksanen 80+3'

Raatti Stadium, Oulu
Referee: Paul Mclaughlin (Republic of Ireland)

3 October 2016
12:00

Sweden	4–0	Georgia
Kulusekvski 10'; Vagic 39'; Saebbö 48'; Crona 75'	Report

Kempeleen Urheilukeskus, Kempele
Referee: Mario Zebec (Croatia)
3 October 2016
12:00

Bulgaria	0–1	Finland
	Report	Ali 55'

Raahen Urheilupuisto, Raahe
Referee: Paul Mclaughlin (Republic of Ireland)

==== Group 9 ====
Pos	Team	Pld	W	D	L	GF	GA	GD	Pts	Qualification
1	Spain	3	3	0	0	13	0	+13	**9**	Elite round
2	Slovakia	3	2	0	1	8	9	−1	**6**	Elite round
3	Northern Ireland (H)	3	1	0	2	5	9	−4	**3**	
4	San Marino	3	0	0	3	1	9	−8	**0**	

Source: UEFA
Rules for classification: Qualification tiebreakers
(H) Hosts
19 September 2016
16:00

San Marino	0–4	Slovakia
	Report	Potoma 44'; Murcko 48'; Gerebenits 50'; Saxa 59'

Stangmore Park, Dungannon
Referee: Nicolas Laforge (Belgium)
19 September 2016
20:30

Spain	4–0	Northern Ireland
Pampín 4'; Ruiz 5'; Gómez 58'; McAleenan 70' (o.g.)	Report

Mourneview Park, Lurgan
Referee: Oleksandr Derdo (Ukraine)

21 September 2016
16:00

Spain	3–0	San Marino
Díaz 24'; Miranda 34'; Córdoba 38'	Report

Solitude, Belfast
Referee: Ferenc Karakó (Hungary)
21 September 2016
20:30

Slovakia	4–3	Northern Ireland
Filipiak 11'; Murcko 65', 77', 80+1'	Report	McGinley 22' (pen.), 71'; Chambers 66'

Seaview, Belfast
Referee: Nicolas Laforge (Belgium)

24 September 2016
16:00

Slovakia	0–6	Spain
	Report	Chust 6'; Petro 25' (o.g.); Ruiz 28', 38', 72'; Miranda 53'

Stangmore Park, Dungannon
Referee: Oleksandr Derdo (Ukraine)
24 September 2016
16:00

Northern Ireland	2–1	San Marino
Kearney 11', 35'	Report	Pancotti 40+1'

Mourneview Park, Lurgan
Referee: Ferenc Karakó (Hungary)

==== Group 10 ====
Pos	Team	Pld	W	D	L	GF	GA	GD	Pts	Qualification
1	Scotland	3	3	0	0	8	0	+8	**9**	Elite round
2	Portugal (H)	3	2	0	1	7	1	+6	**6**	Elite round
3	Wales	3	1	0	2	3	3	0	**3**	
4	Malta	3	0	0	3	0	14	−14	**0**	

Source: UEFA
Rules for classification: Qualification tiebreakers
(H) Hosts
16 September 2016
16:00

Scotland	6–0	Malta
Aitchison 18' (pen.), 25'; Middleton 28'; Deas 37'; Rudden 40+1'; Grech 73' (o.g.)	Report

Complexo Desportivo de Febres, Febres
Referee: Dennis Antamo (Finland)
16 September 2016
18:00

Wales	0–2	Portugal
	Report	Camacho 13' (pen.); Rodrigues 36'

Estádio Municipal Carlos Duarte, Pampilhosa
Referee: Suren Baliyan (Armenia)

18 September 2016
16:00

Scotland	1–0	Wales
Ross 80+1'	Report

Estádio Municipal Carlos Duarte, Pampilhosa
Referee: Alexandre Boucaut (Belgium)
18 September 2016
18:00

Portugal	5–0	Malta
Simões 31'; Justiniano 40+1'; Costa 50'; Rodrigues 73'; Conceição 80+2' (pen.)	Report

Estádio Municipal Sérgio Conceição, Coimbra
Referee: Dennis Antamo (Finland)

21 September 2016
18:00

Portugal	0–1	Scotland
	Report	McInroy 72'

Estádio Municipal Sérgio Conceição, Coimbra
Referee: Alexandre Boucaut (Belgium)
21 September 2016
18:00

Malta	0–3	Wales
	Report	Thorpe 9'; Vale 58'; Oddy 70'

Estádio Municipal Carlos Duarte, Pampilhosa
Referee: Suren Baliyan (Armenia)

==== Group 11 ====
Pos	Team	Pld	W	D	L	GF	GA	GD	Pts	Qualification
1	Cyprus (H)	3	3	0	0	4	0	+4	**9**	Elite round
2	Belarus	3	1	1	1	3	2	+1	**4**	Elite round
3	Belgium	3	1	1	1	2	1	+1	**4**	Elite round
4	Gibraltar	3	0	0	3	1	7	−6	**0**	

Source: UEFA
Rules for classification: Qualification tiebreakers
(H) Hosts
26 October 2016
14:00

Belarus	0–1	Cyprus
	Report	Raounas 55'

Kouklia Community Stadium, Paphos
Referee: Sándor Andó-Szabó (Hungary)
26 October 2016
14:00

Gibraltar	0–2	Belgium
	Report	Dhaeze 25'; Openda 63'

Pafiako Stadium, Paphos
Referee: Johnny Casanova (San Marino)

28 October 2016
14:00

Belarus	3–1	Gibraltar
Montovio 33' (o.g.); Muzychenka 52'; Gorbach 78'	Report	Britto 43' (pen.)

Pafiako Stadium, Paphos
Referee: Roomer Tarajev (Estonia)
28 October 2016
14:00

Belgium	0–1	Cyprus
	Report	Christodoulou 43'

Kouklia Community Stadium, Paphos
Referee: Sándor Andó-Szabó (Hungary)

31 October 2016
14:00

Belgium	0–0	Belarus
	Report

Pafiako Stadium, Paphos
Referee: Roomer Tarajev (Estonia)
31 October 2016
14:00

Cyprus	2–0	Gibraltar
Katsantonis 32'; Gerolemou 44'	Report

Kouklia Community Stadium, Paphos
Referee: Johnny Casanova (San Marino)

==== Group 12 ====
Pos	Team	Pld	W	D	L	GF	GA	GD	Pts	Qualification
1	Israel (H)	3	3	0	0	7	1	+6	**9**	Elite round
2	Poland	3	1	1	1	4	4	0	**4**	Elite round
3	Armenia	3	1	1	1	4	5	−1	**4**	Elite round
4	Iceland	3	0	0	3	2	7	−5	**0**	

Source: UEFA
Rules for classification: Qualification tiebreakers
(H) Hosts
1 November 2016
10:00

Poland	1–1	Armenia
Skóraś 21'	Report	Yeghiazaryan 29'

Shefayim National Team Complex, Shefayim
Referee: Jens Maae (Denmark)
1 November 2016
16:00

Iceland	0–2	Israel
	Report	Dahan 12'; Brami 69'

Herzliya Municipal Stadium, Herzliya
Referee: Yaroslav Kozyk (Ukraine)

3 November 2016
10:00

Poland	2–0	Iceland
Wełniak 11', 78'	Report

Shefayim National Team Complex, Shefayim
Referee: Laurent Kopriwa (Luxembourg)
3 November 2016
16:00

Israel	2–0	Armenia
Strosberg 27'; Kanaan 64'	Report

Herzliya Municipal Stadium, Herzliya
Referee: Jens Maae (Denmark)

6 November 2016
16:00

Israel	3–1	Poland
Kanaan 50'; Hen 58', 68'	Report	Benedyczak 54'

Herzliya Municipal Stadium, Herzliya
Referee: Yaroslav Kozyk (Ukraine)
6 November 2016
16:00

Armenia	3–2	Iceland
Grigoryan 19'; Kurbashyan 36' (pen.), 63'	Report	Hlynsson 25'; Björnsson 80+3'

Shefayim National Team Complex, Shefayim
Referee: Laurent Kopriwa (Luxembourg)

==== Group 13 ====
Pos	Team	Pld	W	D	L	GF	GA	GD	Pts	Qualification
1	Turkey	3	3	0	0	4	0	+4	**9**	Elite round
2	Norway	3	1	1	1	4	5	−1	**4**	Elite round
3	Ukraine	3	0	2	1	3	4	−1	**2**	Elite round
4	Lithuania (H)	3	0	1	2	2	4	−2	**1**	

Source: UEFA
Rules for classification: Qualification tiebreakers
(H) Hosts
23 September 2016
12:00

Turkey	2–0	Norway
Babacan 36', 80+4'	Report

Darius and Girėnas Stadium, Kaunas
Referee: Irfan Peljto (Bosnia and Herzegovina)
23 September 2016
16:00

Ukraine	1–1	Lithuania
Supriaha 60'	Report	Utkus 80+1'

Alytus Stadium, Alytus
Referee: Dejan Jakimovski (Macedonia)

25 September 2016
12:00

Ukraine	0–1	Turkey
	Report	Gül 62' (pen.)

Darius and Girėnas Stadium, Kaunas
Referee: Sandro Schärer (Switzerland)
25 September 2016
16:00

Norway	2–1	Lithuania
Kažukolovas 50' (o.g.); Kalsaas 71' (pen.)	Report	Vareika 51'

Alytus Stadium, Alytus
Referee: Irfan Peljto (Bosnia and Herzegovina)

28 September 2016
16:00

Norway	2–2	Ukraine
Ugland 18'; Strand Larsen 54'	Report	Kashchuk 48'; Titaievskyi 57'

Darius and Girėnas Stadium, Kaunas
Referee: Sandro Schärer (Switzerland)
28 September 2016
16:00

Lithuania	0–1	Turkey
	Report	Babacan 80+3'

Alytus Stadium, Alytus
Referee: Dejan Jakimovski (Macedonia)

=== Ranking of third-placed teams ===
To determine the five best third-placed teams from the qualifying round which advance to the elite round, only the results of the third-placed teams against the first and second-placed teams in their group are taken into account.

Pos	Grp	Team	Pld	W	D	L	GF	GA	GD	Pts	Qualification
1	5	Montenegro	2	0	1	1	3	4	−1	1	Elite round
2	13	Ukraine	2	0	1	1	2	3	−1	1	Elite round
3	11	Belgium	2	0	1	1	0	1	−1	1	Elite round
4	3	Czech Republic	2	0	1	1	3	5	−2	1	Elite round
5	12	Armenia	2	0	1	1	1	3	−2	1 (Note: Tie broken by disciplinary points.)	Elite round
6	4	Macedonia	2	0	1	1	1	3	−2	1	
7	8	Bulgaria	2	0	0	2	1	4	−3	0 (Note: Tie broken by disciplinary points.)	
8	2	Kazakhstan	2	0	0	2	1	4	−3	0	
9	10	Wales	2	0	0	2	0	3	−3	0	
10	6	Azerbaijan	2	0	0	2	1	5	−4	0 (Note: Tie broken by disciplinary points.)	
11	7	Denmark	2	0	0	2	1	5	−4	0	
12	1	Latvia	2	0	0	2	0	4	−4	0	
13	9	Northern Ireland	2	0	0	2	3	8	−5	0	

Source: UEFA
Rules for classification: 1) points; 2) goal difference; 3) goals scored; 4) disciplinary points; 5) coefficient; 6) drawing of lots.

== Elite round ==
=== Draw ===
The draw for the elite round will be held on 13 December 2016, 11:45 CET (UTC+1), at the UEFA headquarters in Nyon, Switzerland.

The teams were seeded according to their results in the qualifying round. Germany, which received a bye to the elite round, were automatically seeded into Pot A. Each group contained one team from Pot A, one team from Pot B, one team from Pot C, and one team from Pot D. Winners and runners-up from the same qualifying round group could not be drawn in the same group, but the best third-placed teams (Montenegro, Ukraine, Belgium, Czech Republic, Armenia) could be drawn in the same group as winners or runners-up from the same qualifying round group. For political reasons, Russia and Ukraine could not be drawn in the same group.

Pos	Grp	Team	Pld	W	D	L	GF	GA	GD	Pts	Seeding
1	—	Germany	0	0	0	0	0	0	0	0	Pot A
2	7	Netherlands	3	3	0	0	15	0	+15	9	Pot A
3	9	Spain	3	3	0	0	13	0	+13	9	Pot A
4	8	Sweden	3	3	0	0	12	1	+11	9	Pot A
5	10	Scotland	3	3	0	0	8	0	+8	9	Pot A
6	2	Republic of Ireland	3	3	0	0	9	2	+7	9	Pot A
7	1	Russia	3	3	0	0	8	1	+7	9	Pot A
8	6	England	3	3	0	0	8	2	+6	9	Pot A
9	12	Israel	3	3	0	0	7	1	+6	9	Pot B
10	11	Cyprus	3	3	0	0	4	0	+4	9 (Note: Tie broken by disciplinary points.)	Pot B
11	13	Turkey	3	3	0	0	4	0	+4	9	Pot B
12	5	France	3	2	1	0	10	2	+8	7	Pot B
13	3	Switzerland	3	2	1	0	8	4	+4	7	Pot B
14	4	Italy	3	2	1	0	3	0	+3	7	Pot B
15	10	Portugal	3	2	0	1	7	1	+6	6	Pot B
16	1	Bosnia and Herzegovina	3	2	0	1	5	2	+3	6	Pot B
17	2	Greece	3	2	0	1	4	1	+3	6	Pot C
18	6	Austria	3	2	0	1	7	5	+2	6	Pot C
19	4	Serbia	3	2	0	1	5	3	+2	6	Pot C
20	7	Hungary	3	2	0	1	6	5	+1	6	Pot C
21	9	Slovakia	3	2	0	1	8	9	−1	6	Pot C
22	8	Finland	3	2	0	1	3	5	−2	6	Pot C
23	5	Slovenia	3	1	2	0	7	4	+3	5	Pot C
24	11	Belarus	3	1	1	1	3	2	+1	4	Pot C
25	11	Belgium	3	1	1	1	2	1	+1	4	Pot D
26	3	Czech Republic	3	1	1	1	5	5	0	4 (Note: Tie broken by disciplinary points.)	Pot D
27	5	Montenegro	3	1	1	1	5	5	0	4	Pot D
28	12	Poland	3	1	1	1	4	4	0	4	Pot D
29	12	Armenia	3	1	1	1	4	5	−1	4 (Note: Tie broken by disciplinary points.)	Pot D
30	13	Norway	3	1	1	1	4	5	−1	4	Pot D
31	3	Faroe Islands	3	1	1	1	4	5	−1	4	Pot D
32	13	Ukraine	3	0	2	1	3	4	−1	2	Pot D

Source: UEFA
Rules for classification: 1) points; 2) goal difference; 3) goals scored; 4) disciplinary points; 5) coefficient; 6) drawing of lots.

=== Groups ===
The elite round must be played by the end of March 2017.

Times up to 25 March 2017 are CET (UTC+1), thereafter times are CEST (UTC+2).

==== Group 1 ====
Pos	Team	Pld	W	D	L	GF	GA	GD	Pts	Qualification
1	Germany	3	3	0	0	19	4	+15	9	Final tournament
2	Turkey (H)	3	2	0	1	11	4	+7	6	Final tournament
3	Finland	3	1	0	2	8	10	−2	3	
4	Armenia	3	0	0	3	1	21	−20	0	

Source: UEFA
Rules for classification: Qualification tiebreakers
(H) Hosts
23 March 2017
10:00

Germany	10–1	Armenia
Jastrzembski 5'; Kurbashyan 35' (o.g.); Becker 40+1'; Abouchabaka 44', 57'; Kühn 55'; Harutyunyan 59' (o.g.); Arp 70'; Kehr 75'; Majetschak 80+5'	Report	A. Hovhannisyan 30'

Arslan Zeki Demirci Spor Kompleksi – Emir Hotels 2, Manavgat
Referee: Barbeno Luca (San Marino)
23 March 2017
13:30

Finland	1–4	Turkey
Tolonen 57'	Report	Babacan 17'; Kabak 20'; Y. Akgün 39'; S. Akgün 53'

Arslan Zeki Demirci Spor Kompleksi – Emir Hotels 1, Manavgat
Referee: Iwan Arwel Griffith (Wales)

25 March 2017
10:00

Germany	6–2	Finland
Ludewig 6'; Jastrzembski 25', 56'; Malone 28'; Abouchabaka 40', 47'	Report	Tolonen 17', 20'

Arslan Zeki Demirci Spor Kompleksi – Emir Hotels 2, Manavgat
Referee: Rade Obrenović (Slovenia)
25 March 2017
13:30

Turkey	6–0	Armenia
Babacan 26'; K. Hovhannisyan 36' (o.g.); Y. Akgün 49'; Adıgüzel 51'; Karaahmet 66'; Güneş 80+1'	Report

Arslan Zeki Demirci Spor Kompleksi – Emir Hotels 1, Manavgat
Referee: Iwan Arwel Griffith (Wales)

28 March 2017
14:30

Turkey	1–3	Germany
Y. Akgün 53'	Report	Arp 14', 45'; Abouchabaka 74' (pen.)

Arslan Zeki Demirci Spor Kompleksi – Emir Hotels 1, Manavgat
Referee: Rade Obrenović (Slovenia)
28 March 2017
14:30

Armenia	0–5	Finland
	Report	Tolonen 2', 19'; Ahadi 54'; Pellikka 60'; Ali 70'

Arslan Zeki Demirci Spor Kompleksi – Emir Hotels 2, Manavgat
Referee: Barbeno Luca (San Marino)

==== Group 2 ====
Pos	Team	Pld	W	D	L	GF	GA	GD	Pts	Qualification
1	Hungary (H)	3	2	0	1	3	2	+1	6	Final tournament
2	Norway	3	1	1	1	5	3	+2	4	Final tournament
3	Israel	3	1	1	1	1	3	−2	4	
4	Russia	3	0	2	1	3	4	−1	2	

Source: UEFA
Rules for classification: Qualification tiebreakers
(H) Hosts
21 March 2017
14:30

Russia	2–2	Norway
Martynov 64'; Chelidze 80+1'	Report	Hove 36'; Evjen 62'

Városi Stadion, Dabas
Referee: Lawrence Visser (Belgium)
21 March 2017
15:30

Hungary	0–1	Israel
	Report	Hen 79'

Globall Football Park, Telki
Referee: Duje Strukan (Croatia)

23 March 2017
14:30

Israel	0–3	Norway
	Report	Haaland 20', 54'; Kalsaas 38' (pen.)

Városi Stadion, Dabas
Referee: Lawrence Visser (Belgium)
23 March 2017
15:30

Russia	1–2	Hungary
Prutsev 16'	Report	Szoboszlai 74', 80+4'

Hidegkuti Nándor Stadium, Budapest
Referee: Keith Kennedy (Northern Ireland)

26 March 2017
13:00

Israel	0–0	Russia
	Report

Városi Stadion, Dabas
Referee: Duje Strukan (Croatia)
26 March 2017
13:00

Norway	0–1	Hungary
	Report	Szoboszlai 80+3'

Globall Football Park, Telki
Referee: Keith Kennedy (Northern Ireland)

==== Group 3 ====
Pos	Team	Pld	W	D	L	GF	GA	GD	Pts	Qualification
1	Spain	3	2	0	1	5	2	+3	6	Final tournament
2	Portugal (H)	3	1	1	1	7	5	+2	4	
3	Poland	3	1	1	1	7	6	+1	4	
4	Greece	3	1	0	2	1	7	−6	3	

Source: UEFA
Rules for classification: Qualification tiebreakers
(H) Hosts
10 March 2017
17:00

Greece	0–4	Portugal
	Report	Neto 8'; Camacho 40'; Embaló 63'; Simões 68'

Estádio Municipal, Nazaré
Referee: Ian McNabb (Northern Ireland)
10 March 2017
19:00

Spain	3–1	Poland
Ruiz 37'; Alonso 49'; Blanco 79'	Report	Kiwior 80+1' (pen.)

Estádio Municipal, Marinha Grande
Referee: Espen Eskås (Norway)

12 March 2017
19:00

Spain	0–1	Greece
	Report	Lyratzis 74' (pen.)

Estádio Municipal, Rio Maior
Referee: Halil Umut Meler (Turkey)
12 March 2017
19:00

Portugal	3–3	Poland
Camacho 7', 28'; Embaló 78' (pen.)	Report	Sobol 16', 80'; Kiwior 35' (pen.)

Estádio Municipal, Marinha Grande
Referee: Espen Eskås (Norway)

15 March 2017
17:00

Portugal	0–2	Spain
	Report	Ruiz 18' (pen.); Díaz 46'

Estádio Municipal, Nazaré
Referee: Halil Umut Meler (Turkey)
15 March 2017
17:00

Poland	3–0	Greece
Skóraś 11'; Praszelik 36'; Kiwior 64'	Report

Estádio Municipal, Marinha Grande
Referee: Ian McNabb (Northern Ireland)

==== Group 4 ====
Pos	Team	Pld	W	D	L	GF	GA	GD	Pts	Qualification
1	Scotland (H)	3	3	0	0	8	1	+7	9	Final tournament
2	Serbia	3	2	0	1	3	2	+1	6	Final tournament
3	Switzerland	3	1	0	2	4	4	0	3	
4	Montenegro	3	0	0	3	2	10	−8	0	

Source: UEFA
Rules for classification: Qualification tiebreakers
(H) Hosts
17 March 2017
14:00

Serbia	2–1	Switzerland
Stuparević 75'; Pavlović 80+3'	Report	Gonzalez 11'

Cappielow Park, Greenock
Referee: Robert Hennessy (Republic of Ireland)
17 March 2017
20:30

Scotland	6–1	Montenegro
Aitchison 10', 53'; Rudden 18'; McInroy 27'; Middleton 60', 74'	Report	Rakonjac 44'

St Mirren Park, Paisley
Referee: Krzysztof Jakubik (Poland)

19 March 2017
14:00

Switzerland	3–1	Montenegro
Del Campo 80+2', 80+5'; Marchand 80+3'	Report	N. Krstović 18'

Cappielow Park, Greenock
Referee: Robert Hennessy (Republic of Ireland)
19 March 2017
16:00

Scotland	1–0	Serbia
Middleton 23'	Report

St Mirren Park, Paisley
Referee: Luis Teixeira (Portugal)

22 March 2017
17:00

Switzerland	0–1	Scotland
	Report	Middleton 22' (pen.)

St Mirren Park, Paisley
Referee: Krzysztof Jakubik (Poland)
22 March 2017
17:00

Montenegro	0–1	Serbia
	Report	Stuparević 57'

Cappielow Park, Greenock
Referee: Luis Teixeira (Portugal)

==== Group 5 ====
Pos	Team	Pld	W	D	L	GF	GA	GD	Pts	Qualification
1	Netherlands (H)	3	3	0	0	7	3	+4	9	Final tournament
2	Italy	3	2	0	1	5	2	+3	6	Final tournament
3	Belarus	3	1	0	2	4	7	−3	3	
4	Belgium	3	0	0	3	1	5	−4	0	

Source: UEFA
Rules for classification: Qualification tiebreakers
(H) Hosts
14 March 2017
16:00

Netherlands	2–0	Belgium
Buitink 25', 41'	Report

Sportpark Parkzicht, Uden
Referee: Fedayi San (Switzerland)
14 March 2017
19:00

Belarus	0–3	Italy
	Report	Kean 42', 61'; Merola 73'

Sportpark Zuid, Groesbeek
Referee: Rob Harvey (Republic of Ireland)

16 March 2017
18:00

Netherlands	3–2	Belarus
Oosting 16'; El Bouchataoui 46'; Redan 63'	Report	Kirilenko 49', 68'

Sportpark Parkzicht, Uden
Referee: Stefan Apostolov (Bulgaria)
16 March 2017
18:00

Italy	1–0	Belgium
Caligara 78'	Report

Sportpark Zuid, Groesbeek
Referee: Rob Harvey (Republic of Ireland)

19 March 2017
15:00

Italy	1–2	Netherlands
Nicolussi Caviglia 52'	Report	Redan 8' (pen.); De la Vega 13'

Sportpark Zuid, Groesbeek
Referee: Fedayi San (Switzerland)
19 March 2017
15:00

Belgium	1–2	Belarus
Gilis 48'	Report	Vasilevich 7'; Muzychenka 71'

Sportpark Parkzicht, Uden
Referee: Stefan Apostolov (Bulgaria)

==== Group 6 ====
Pos	Team	Pld	W	D	L	GF	GA	GD	Pts	Qualification
1	France	3	2	1	0	6	2	+4	7	Final tournament
2	Ukraine	3	2	0	1	5	5	0	6	Final tournament
3	Austria (H)	3	1	1	1	5	4	+1	4	
4	Sweden	3	0	0	3	2	7	−5	0	

Source: UEFA
Rules for classification: Qualification tiebreakers
(H) Hosts
23 March 2017
11:00

Sweden	1–2	Ukraine
Dmytruk 78' (o.g.)	Report	Mashchenko 34'; Snurnitsyn 80+1'

Solarstadion, Gleisdorf
Referee: Aleksandar Vasić (Serbia)
23 March 2017
18:00

Austria	1–1	France
Schmid 60'	Report	Pau 32'

Gansbärenstadion, Rohrbach an der Lafnitz
Referee: Donald Robertson (Scotland)

25 March 2017
11:00

France	3–1	Ukraine
Caqueret 27' (pen.); Picouleau 43'; Geubbels 73'	Report	Kashchuk 45'

Thermenstadion, Bad Waltersdorf
Referee: Donald Robertson (Scotland)
25 March 2017
15:30

Sweden	1–3	Austria
Mawana 79'	Report	Aganovic 44', 80+2'; Schmid 55' (pen.)

Gansbärenstadion, Rohrbach an der Lafnitz
Referee: Omar Pashayev (Azerbaijan)

28 March 2017
17:00

France	2–0	Sweden
Caqueret 55'; Geubbels 65'	Report

Solarstadion, Gleisdorf
Referee: Aleksandar Vasić (Serbia)
28 March 2017
17:00

Ukraine	2–1	Austria
Kashchuk 24', 80+3'	Report	Schmid 15'

Thermenstadion, Bad Waltersdorf
Referee: Omar Pashayev (Azerbaijan)

==== Group 7 ====
Pos	Team	Pld	W	D	L	GF	GA	GD	Pts	Qualification
1	England	3	3	0	0	10	3	+7	9	Final tournament
2	Bosnia and Herzegovina (H)	3	1	1	1	2	2	0	4	Final tournament
3	Slovenia	3	0	2	1	2	6	−4	2	
4	Czech Republic	3	0	1	2	6	9	−3	1	

Source: UEFA
Rules for classification: Qualification tiebreakers
(H) Hosts
23 March 2017
13:00

England	5–3	Czech Republic
Brewster 9', 46'; Foden 11', 66'; Gibbs-White 15'	Report	Majka 37', 47'; Hezoucky 76'

Stadion Etno Selo Stanišići, Bijeljina
Referee: Dennis Higler (Netherlands)
23 March 2017
15:45

Slovenia	0–0	Bosnia and Herzegovina
	Report

Stadion Etno Selo Stanišići, Bijeljina
Referee: Horațiu Feșnic (Romania)

25 March 2017
15:00

England	4–0	Slovenia
Sancho 25', 76'; Eyoma 29'; Loader 54'	Report

Gradski stadion, Bijeljina
Referee: Furkat Atazhanov (Kazakhstan)
25 March 2017
15:00

Bosnia and Herzegovina	2–1	Czech Republic
Mehanović 10'; Tegeltija 69' (pen.)	Report	Hezoucky 80'

Stadion Etno Selo Stanišići, Bijeljina
Referee: Horațiu Feșnic (Romania)

28 March 2017
15:00

Bosnia and Herzegovina	0–1	England
	Report	Gibson 15'

Gradski stadion, Bijeljina
Referee: Dennis Higler (Netherlands)
28 March 2017
15:00

Czech Republic	2–2	Slovenia
Majka 80'; Hezoucky 80+3'	Report	Gregorin 48'; Prelec 70'

Stadion Etno Selo Stanišići, Bijeljina
Referee: Furkat Atazhanov (Kazakhstan)

==== Group 8 ====
Pos	Team	Pld	W	D	L	GF	GA	GD	Pts	Qualification
1	Republic of Ireland	3	3	0	0	7	0	+7	9	Final tournament
2	Faroe Islands	3	1	1	1	2	5	−3	4	Final tournament
3	Slovakia	3	1	0	2	3	4	−1	3	
4	Cyprus (H)	3	0	1	2	1	4	−3	1	

Source: UEFA
Rules for classification: Qualification tiebreakers
(H) Hosts
15 March 2017
14:15

Republic of Ireland	4–0	Faroe Islands
Connolly 9', 23'; Idah 41'; Doherty 43'	Report

Pafiako Stadium, Paphos
Referee: Jason Lee Barcelo (Gibraltar)
15 March 2017
14:15

Slovakia	2–1	Cyprus
Dávidík 4'; Potoma 34'	Report	Toumazou 71'

Kouklia Community Stadium, Paphos
Referee: Andi Koçi (Albania)

17 March 2017
14:15

Republic of Ireland	1–0	Slovakia
McAuley 66'	Report

Pafiako Stadium, Paphos
Referee: Aleksei Matyunin (Russia)
17 March 2017
14:15

Cyprus	0–0	Faroe Islands
	Report

Kouklia Community Stadium, Paphos
Referee: Jason Lee Barcelo (Gibraltar)

20 March 2017
14:00

Cyprus	0–2	Republic of Ireland
	Report	Connolly 40', 80+3'

Kouklia Community Stadium, Paphos
Referee: Aleksei Matyunin (Russia)
20 March 2017
14:00

Faroe Islands	2–1	Slovakia
Jacobsen 28'; Sørensen 45'	Report	Pišoja 54'

Pafiako Stadium, Paphos
Referee: Andi Koçi (Albania)

=== Ranking of second-placed teams ===
To determine the seven best second-placed teams from the elite round which qualify for the final tournament, only the results of the second-placed teams against the first and third-placed teams in their group are taken into account.

Pos	Grp	Team	Pld	W	D	L	GF	GA	GD	Pts	Qualification
1	5	Italy	2	1	0	1	4	2	+2	3	Final tournament
2	2	Norway	2	1	0	1	3	1	+2	3	Final tournament
3	1	Turkey	2	1	0	1	5	4	+1	3	Final tournament
4	4	Serbia	2	1	0	1	2	2	0	3	Final tournament
5	6	Ukraine	2	1	0	1	3	4	−1	3	Final tournament
6	8	Faroe Islands	2	1	0	1	2	5	−3	3	Final tournament
7	7	Bosnia and Herzegovina	2	0	1	1	0	1	−1	1	Final tournament
8	3	Portugal	2	0	1	1	3	5	−2	1	

Source: UEFA
Rules for classification: 1) points; 2) goal difference; 3) goals scored; 4) disciplinary points; 5) coefficient; 6) drawing of lots.

== Qualified teams ==
The following 16 teams qualify for the final tournament.

Team	Qualified as	Qualified on	Previous appearances in tournament^{1} only U-17 era (since 2002)
Croatia	Hosts	26 January 2015	3 (2005, 2013, 2015)
Germany	Elite round Group 1 winners	25 March 2017	9 (2002, 2006, 2007, **2009**, 2011, 2012, 2014, 2015, 2016)
Hungary	Elite round Group 2 winners	26 March 2017	3 (2002, 2003, 2006)
Spain	Elite round Group 3 winners	15 March 2017	10 (2002, 2003, 2004, 2006, **2007**, **2008**, 2009, 2010, 2015, 2016)
Scotland	Elite round Group 4 winners	22 March 2017	4 (2008, 2014, 2015, 2016)
Netherlands	Elite round Group 5 winners	16 March 2017	10 (2002, 2005, 2007, 2008, 2009, **2011**, **2012**, 2014, 2015, 2016)
France	Elite round Group 6 winners	28 March 2017	10 (2002, **2004**, 2007, 2008, 2009, 2010, 2011, 2012, **2015**, 2016)
England	Elite round Group 7 winners	25 March 2017	11 (2002, 2003, 2004, 2005, 2007, 2009, **2010**, 2011, **2014**, 2015, 2016)
Republic of Ireland	Elite round Group 8 winners	17 March 2017	2 (2008, 2015)
Italy	Elite round best seven runners-up	16 March 2017	6 (2003, 2005, 2009, 2013, 2015, 2016)
Norway	Elite round best seven runners-up	26 March 2017	0 (debut)
Turkey	Elite round best seven runners-up	25 March 2017	6 (2004, **2005**, 2008, 2009, 2010, 2014)
Serbia	Elite round best seven runners-up	22 March 2017	5 (2002^{2}, 2006^{3}, 2008, 2011, 2016)
Ukraine	Elite round best seven runners-up	28 March 2017	5 (2002, 2004, 2007, 2013, 2016)
Faroe Islands	Elite round best seven runners-up	20 March 2017	0 (debut)
Bosnia and Herzegovina	Elite round best seven runners-up	28 March 2017	1 (2016)

^{1} Bold indicates champion for that year. Italic indicates host for that year.
^{2} As Yugoslavia
^{3} As Serbia and Montenegro

== Top goalscorers ==
The following players scored four goals or more in the qualifying competition:

7 goals

- (Republic of Ireland) Aaron Connolly

6 goals

- (Finland) Maximo Tolonen
- (Spain) Abel Ruiz

5 goals

- (Germany) Elias Abouchabaka
- (Scotland) Glenn Middleton
- (Sweden) Filston Mawana
- (Turkey) Atalay Babacan

4 goals

- (Austria) Romano Schmid
- (Denmark) Christian Tue
- (England) Phil Foden
- (England) Jadon Sancho
- (France) Yacine Adli
- (Hungary) Dominik Szoboszlai
- (Netherlands) Thomas Buitink
- (Netherlands) Daishawn Redan
- (Portugal) Rafael Camacho
- (Republic of Ireland) Adam Idah
- (Scotland) Jack Aitchison
- (Serbia) Filip Stuparević
- (Slovakia) Martin Murcko
- (Ukraine) Olexiy Kashchuk

Source: UEFA.com
