= 2023 UEFA European Under-21 Championship qualification Group C =

Football tournament qualification stage

Group C of the 2023 UEFA European Under-21 Championship qualifying competition consisted of six teams: Spain, Russia, Slovakia, Northern Ireland, Lithuania, and Malta. The composition of the nine groups in the qualifying group stage was decided by the draw held on 28 January 2021, 12:00 CET (UTC+1), at the UEFA headquarters in Nyon, Switzerland, with the teams seeded according to their coefficient ranking.

On 28 February 2022, FIFA and UEFA announced that Russia was suspended from all competitions. On 2 May 2022, UEFA announced that Russia would no longer be allowed to take part in the competition, that their previous results were nullified, and that Group C would continue with five teams. Therefore, Spain qualified for the tournament with a game to spare.

== Standings ==
Pos	Team	Pld	W	D	L	GF	GA	GD	Pts	Qualification	Spain	Slovakia		Lithuania	Malta	Russia
1	Spain	8	8	0	0	37	5	+32	24	Final tournament	—	3–2	3–0	8–0	7–1	~~4–1~~
2	Slovakia	8	5	0	3	18	10	+8	15	Play-offs	2–3	—	2–1	3–1	4–0	Canc.
3	Northern Ireland	8	2	1	5	8	18	−10	7		0–6	1–0	—	4–0	0–2	Canc.
4	Lithuania	8	2	1	5	7	22	−15	7		0–2	0–2	1–1	—	2–1	~~0–3~~
5	Malta	8	2	0	6	10	25	−15	6		0–5	1–3	4–1	1–3	—	Canc.
6	Russia (Note: On 28 February 2022, FIFA and UEFA suspended Russian national teams from all competitions due to the Russian invasion of Ukraine. On 2 May 2022, UEFA expelled Russia and declared all of their results to be null and void.)	0	0	0	0	0	0	0	0	Disqualified	~~1–0~~	~~3–0~~	~~1–0~~	Canc.	~~6–0~~	—

Source: UEFA
Rules for classification: Tiebreakers

== Matches ==
Times are CET/CEST, (Note: CEST (UTC+2) for dates between 31 March and 26 October 2021 and between 29 March and 24 October 2022, and CET (UTC+1) for all other dates.) as listed by UEFA (local times, if different, are in parentheses).

3 September 2021
16:30

Malta	4–1	Northern Ireland
Engerer 24'; Veselji 36', 40' (pen.); Attard 84'	Report	Lane 58'

Centenary Stadium, Ta' Qali
Attendance: 184
Referee: Milovan Milačić (Montenegro)
3 September 2021
17:30

Slovakia	3–1	Lithuania
Kaprálik 24', 61'; Trusa 79' (pen.)	Report	Dolžnikov 56' (pen.)

Štadión pod Zoborom, Nitra
Attendance: 757
Referee: Kaspar Sjöberg (Sweden)
3 September 2021
20:45

Spain	Voided (4–1)	Russia
Niño 13', 54'; Pino 47', 86'	Report	(Agalarov 10'

Estadio Francisco de la Hera, Almendralejo
Attendance: 1,585
Referee: Nathan Verboomen (Belgium)

7 September 2021
17:30 (18:30 EEST)

Lithuania	0–2	Spain
	Report	Francés 32'; Pino 78'

LFF Stadium, Vilnius
Attendance: 671
Referee: Nejc Kajtazovic (Slovenia)
7 September 2021
18:00 (19:00 MST)

Russia	Voided (6–0)	Malta
Khlusevich 6', 14'; Agalarov 17', 74'; Bozhenov 80'; Kravtsov 86'	Report

Arena Khimki, Khimki
Attendance: 308
Referee: Artyom Kuchin (Kazakhstan)
7 September 2021
20:30 (19:30 BST)

Northern Ireland	1–0	Slovakia
Galbraith 54' (pen.)	Report

Mourneview Park, Lurgan
Attendance: 397
Referee: Vilhjalmur Thorarinsson (Iceland)

8 October 2021
17:30 (18:30 EEST)

Lithuania	2–1	Malta
Milašius 38'; Kalinauskas 56' (pen.)	Report	Sixsmith 90+4'

Alytus Stadium, Alytus
Attendance: 211
Referee: Marcel Birsan (Romania)
8 October 2021
18:00 (19:00 MST)

Russia	Voided (1–0)	Northern Ireland
Prokhin 16'	Report

Arena Khimki, Khimki
Attendance: 250
Referee: Luka Bilbija (Bosnia and Herzegovina)
8 October 2021
20:45

Spain	3–2	Slovakia
Guillamón 58'; S. Gómez 80' (pen.); Miranda 88' (pen.)	Report	Bernát 19'; Lichý 71'

La Cartuja, Seville
Attendance: 4,200
Referee: Kevin Clancy (Scotland)

12 October 2021
16:30

Slovakia	4–0	Malta
Trusa 23', 64', 81' (pen.); Kadák 36'	Report

Štadión pod Zoborom, Nitra
Attendance: 468
Referee: Eldorjan Hamiti (Albania)
12 October 2021
17:30 (18:30 EEST)

Lithuania	Voided (0–3)	Russia
	Report	Tyukavin 65', 71'; Uzėla 68' (o.g.)

Alytus Stadium, Alytus
Attendance: 220
Referee: Christopher Jaeger (Austria)
12 October 2021
20:45

Spain	3–0	Northern Ireland
S. Gómez 26' (pen.), 32'; Ruiz 56'	Report

La Cartuja, Seville
Attendance: 2,632
Referee: Vitaliy Romanov (Ukraine)

12 November 2021
15:00 (14:00 GMT)

Northern Ireland	4–0	Lithuania
McCalmont 8', 75'; O'Neill 44' (pen.); Conn-Clarke 87'	Report

The Showgrounds, Ballymena
Attendance: 324
Referee: Joonas Jaanovits (Estonia)
12 November 2021
18:00 (20:00 MST)

Russia	Voided (3–0)	Slovakia
Khlusevich 34'; Agalarov 45'; Suleymanov 82'	Report

Arena Khimki, Khimki
Attendance: 296
Referee: Peter Kjaesgaard (Denmark)
12 November 2021
20:45

Malta	0–5	Spain
	Report	S. Gómez 23'; Ruiz 24', 88'; Guillamón 40'; Lobete 50'

Centenary Stadium, Ta' Qali
Attendance: 365
Referee: Dario Bel (Croatia)

16 November 2021
17:30 (18:30 EET)

Lithuania	0–2	Slovakia
	Report	Trusa 12'; Kaprálik 55'

Alytus Stadium, Alytus
Attendance: 172
Referee: Haris Kaljanac (Bosnia and Herzegovina)
16 November 2021
18:00 (20:00 MST)

Russia	Voided (1–0)	Spain
Tyukavin 60'	Report

Arena Khimki, Khimki
Attendance: 396
Referee: Jochem Kamphuis (Netherlands)
16 November 2021
20:30 (19:30 GMT)

Northern Ireland	0–2	Malta
	Report	Grima 49'; A. Zammit 89'

Mourneview Park, Lurgan
Attendance: 347
Referee: Kári Á Høvdanum (Faroe Islands)

25 March 2022
15:00

Malta	Cancelled	Russia
	Report

Centenary Stadium, Ta'Qali
25 March 2022
16:00

Slovakia	2–1	Northern Ireland
Trusa 37'; Kadák 86' (pen.)	Report	Johnston 61'

Štadión pod Dubňom, Žilina
Attendance: 1,377
Referee: Visar Kastrati (Kosovo)
25 March 2022
20:00

Spain	8–0	Lithuania
Rodri 16', 37'; S. Gómez 35'; Gil 40'; Ruiz 43'; Sánchez 61'; Baena 65'; Turrientes 70'	Report

Estadio El Prado, Talavera de la Reina
Attendance: 3,700
Referee: Joni Hyytiä (Finland)

29 March 2022
15:00 (14:00 BST)

Northern Ireland	Cancelled	Russia
	Report

Mourneview Park, Lurgan
29 March 2022
16:00

Slovakia	2–3	Spain
Bernát 38' (pen.); Nebyla 90+1'	Report	Gil 4'; S. Gómez 66'; Navarro 81'

Štadión pod Dubňom, Žilina
Attendance: 3,024
Referee: Christopher Jaeger (Austria)
29 March 2022
16:00

Malta	1–3	Lithuania
J. Zammit 78'	Report	Gauci 64' (o.g.); Dovydaitis 80'; Steponavičius 90+3'

Centenary Stadium, Ta'Qali
Attendance: 142
Referee: Thorvaldur Árnason (Iceland)

3 June 2022
14:00 (13:00 BST)

Northern Ireland	0–6	Spain
	Report	Ruiz 22'; Gil 50', 61'; Miranda 64'; Riquelme 76'; V. Gómez 87'

Inver Park, Larne
Attendance: 1,100
Referee: Vitālijs Spasjoņņikovs (Latvia)
3 June 2022

Russia	Cancelled	Lithuania
	Report

3 June 2022
18:30

Malta	1–3	Slovakia
Attard 44'	Report	Pokorný 45+3'; Iľko 90+2', 90+7'

Centenary Stadium, Ta' Qali
Attendance: 218
Referee: Snir Levy (Israel)

7 June 2022
17:00 (18:00 EEST)

Lithuania	1–1	Northern Ireland
Tutyškinas 90+7'	Report	Taylor 17'

Alytus Stadium, Alytus
Attendance: 374
Referee: Nenad Minaković (Serbia)
7 June 2022

Slovakia	Cancelled	Russia
	Report

NTC Senec, Senec
7 June 2022
20:00

Spain	7–1	Malta
Navarro 8', 69'; Ruiz 47', 64'; Sánchez 55'; Lobete 73', 78'	Report	A. Zammit 71'

Estadio Álvarez Claro, Melilla
Attendance: 3,273
Referee: Juri Frischer (Estonia)

== Goalscorers ==
The table below includes 19 goals from 6 voided matches.

There were 99 goals scored in 26 matches, for an average of 3.81 goals per match.

7 goals

- (Spain) Abel Ruiz

6 goals

- (Slovakia) Matej Trusa
- (Spain) Sergio Gómez

4 goals

- (Russia) Gamid Agalarov
- (Spain) Bryan Gil

3 goals

- (Russia) Daniil Khlusevich
- (Russia) Konstantin Tyukavin
- (Slovakia) Adrián Kaprálik
- (Spain) Julen Lobete
- (Spain) Robert Navarro
- (Spain) Yeremy Pino

2 goals

- (Malta) Ayrton Attard
- (Malta) Matteja Veselji
- (Malta) Andrea Zammit
- (Northern Ireland) Alfie McCalmont
- (Slovakia) Ján Bernát
- (Slovakia) Patrik Iľko
- (Slovakia) Jakub Kadák
- (Spain) Hugo Guillamón
- (Spain) Juan Miranda
- (Spain) Fer Niño
- (Spain) Rodri
- (Spain) Manu Sánchez

1 goal

- (Lithuania) Artūr Dolžnikov
- (Lithuania) Deividas Dovydaitis
- (Lithuania) Tomas Kalinauskas
- (Lithuania) Titas Milašius
- (Lithuania) Faustas Steponavičius
- (Lithuania) Artemijus Tutyškinas
- (Malta) Jake Engerer
- (Malta) Marcus Grima
- (Malta) Jamie Sixsmith
- (Malta) Joseph Zammit
- (Northern Ireland) Chris Conn-Clarke
- (Northern Ireland) Ethan Galbraith
- (Northern Ireland) Carl Johnston
- (Northern Ireland) Paddy Lane
- (Northern Ireland) Paul O'Neill
- (Northern Ireland) Dale Taylor
- (Russia) Kirill Bozhenov
- (Russia) Kirill Kravtsov
- (Russia) Danila Prokhin
- (Russia) Timur Suleymanov
- (Slovakia) Filip Lichý
- (Slovakia) Sebastian Nebyla
- (Slovakia) Peter Pokorný
- (Spain) Álex Baena
- (Spain) Alejandro Francés
- (Spain) Víctor Gómez
- (Spain) Rodrigo Riquelme
- (Spain) Beñat Turrientes

1 own goal

- (Lithuania) Karolis Uzėla (against Russia)
- (Malta) Christian Gauci (against Lithuania)
