= Faustas Steponavičius =

Lithuanian footballer

Personal information
- Full name: Faustas Steponavičius
- Date of birth: 8 June 2004 (age 22)
- Place of birth: Panevėžys, Lithuania
- Height: 1.89 m (6 ft 2 in)
- Position: Forward

Team information
- Current team: FK Sūduva

Youth career
- –2020: Panevėžys

Senior career*
Years	Team	Apps	(Gls)
2019–2021	Panevėžys	2	(0)
2021–2022	Genoa	0	(0)
2022	→ Jarun (loan)	7	(0)
2023	RFS	0	(0)
2023	→ Tukums 2000 (loan)	15	(8)
2023–2025	Botev Plovdiv	22	(1)
2024	→ Septemvri Sofia (loan)	9	(0)
2025	→ Panevėžys (loan)	32	(1)
2026–	Sūduva	16	(4)

International career^{‡}
2019–2020	Lithuania U17	5	(0)
2021	Lithuania U18	2	(0)
2021–	Lithuania U19	13	(1)
2022–	Lithuania U21	3	(1)
2023–	Lithuania	4	(1)
- * Club domestic league appearances and goals as of 30 May 2026 ‡ National team caps and goals as of 20:20, 18 November 2026 (UTC)

Faustas Steponavičius (born 8 June 2004) is a Lithuanian professional footballer who plays as a forward for A Lyga club Sūduva, on loan from Botev Plovdiv and the Lithuania national team.

== Club career ==
Steponavičius began his career with hometown club FK Panevėžys. From 2019 through 2021 he made 54 appearances for the club's youth and reserve sides, scoring 23 goals. He made his debut for the first-team in an A Lyga match against FK Kauno Žalgiris during the 2020 season. For the 2022 season he scored eleven goals for the reserve side.

In July 2022 Steponavičius went on a two-week trial with Genoa of Italy's Serie A. The following month it was announced that he had signed a one-year contract to initially join the youth academy. In summer 2022, he went on loan to NK Jarun of Croatia's second-tier league. He went on to make seven appearances for the club before departing in search of more first-team playing time.

In 2023 Steponavičius returned to the Baltics, joining FK RFS and going out on loan to FK Tukums 2000 for the 2023 Latvian Higher League season. He went on to score eight goals in fifteen matches in his breakout season en route to becoming one of the top scorers in the league. In June 2023 it was announced that a club from Bulgaria had purchased the player from FK RFS. The club who had activated Steponavičius's buyout clause was soon revealed to be Botev Plovdiv. The club reportedly paid €200,000 for the player.

On 13 January 2025 FK Panevėžys announced, that he had been loaned to them from PFC Botev Plovdiv.

== International career ==
Steponavičius has been a regular member of Lithuania's youth national sides since the under-15 level. In March 2022 he scored in a 3–1 victory over Malta in 2023 UEFA European Under-21 Championship qualification. Three months later he scored for the national under-19 side in a 1–2 defeat to Estonia in the 2022 Under-19 Baltic Cup.

Steponavičius received his first call-up to the senior national team in June 2023 ahead of UEFA Euro 2024 qualifying matches against Bulgaria and Hungary.

=== International goals ===
As of match played 30 September 2026

List of international goals scored by Faustas Steponavičius
No.	Date	Venue	Opponent	Score	Result	Competition
1	30 September 2026	Darius and Girėnas Stadium, Kaunas, Lithuania	Andorra	2–0	3–0	Friendly

== Honours ==
FK Panevėžys

- Lithuanian Cup: 2025
