= Matej Trusa =

Slovak footballer (born 2000)

Personal information
- Full name: Matej Trusa
- Date of birth: 29 November 2000 (age 25)
- Place of birth: Michalovce, Slovakia
- Height: 1.88 m (6 ft 2 in)
- Position: Forward

Team information
- Current team: Dunajská Streda
- Number: 46

Youth career
- 2009–2019: Zemplín Michalovce

Senior career*
Years	Team	Apps	(Gls)
2019–2021	Zemplín Michalovce	61	(13)
2022–2023	Viktoria Plzeň	7	(0)
2022–2023	→ Hradec Králové (loan)	15	(2)
2023–	Dunajská Streda	68	(29)

International career
2020–2022	Slovakia U21	15	(9)
- * Club domestic league appearances and goals as of 21 September 2026

Matej Trusa (born 29 November 2000) is a Slovak professional footballer who plays as a forward for Dunajská Streda.

== Club career ==
=== Zemplín Michalovce ===
Trusa made his Fortuna Liga debut for Zemplín Michalovce against iClinic Sereď on 16 February 2019. He replaced Peter Kolesár in the stoppage time of the 1–0 home victory.

On 14 September 2019, he was seriously injured in a home league fixture against AS Trenčín, when he was tackled by Cole Kpekawa in the 8th minute of the match. He suffered tibia and fibula fracture and it was reported that he was going to be unavailable for up to 12 months. Trusa, however, managed to recover in six months.

=== Dunajská Streda ===
On 1 July 2023, Trusa re-joined former manager from Viktoria Plzeň Adrián Guľa at Dunajská Streda, signing a three-year contract.

== International career ==
Trusa was first recognised with a senior national team call-up on 23 May 2022, while still being active in the U21 team, although he remained unnominated for June international fixtures following a suspension ahead of a qualifier against Malta. Senior team Štefan Tarkovič recognised him as an alternate ahead of four UEFA Nations League fixtures against Belarus, Azerbaijan and Kazakhstan scheduled for June.

== Honours ==
Individual

- Slovak Super Liga Goal of the Month: December 2021
