= Ján Bernát =

Slovak footballer (born 2001)

Personal information
- Date of birth: 10 January 2001 (age 25)
- Place of birth: Prešov, Slovakia
- Height: 1.80 m (5 ft 11 in)
- Position: Midfielder

Team information
- Current team: Komárno
- Number: 23

Youth career
- 2009–2016: Tatran Prešov
- 2016–2020: Žilina

Senior career*
| Years | Team | Apps | (Gls) |
| 2018–2021 | Žilina B | 14 | (4) |
| 2019–2022 | Žilina | 61 | (15) |
| 2021–2022 | → Westerlo (loan) | 27 | (9) |
| 2022–2025 | Westerlo | 7 | (0) |
| 2023–2024 | → Spartak Trnava (loan) | 17 | (1) |
| 2024–2025 | → DAC Dunajská Streda (loan) | 9 | (0) |
| 2026 | Tatran Prešov | 10 | (1) |
| 2026– | Komárno | 4 | (1) |

International career
| 2016 | Slovakia U15 | 2 | (0) |
| 2017 | Slovakia U16 | 5 | (1) |
| 2017–2018 | Slovakia U17 | 7 | (1) |
| 2019 | Slovakia U18 | 2 | (0) |
| 2019 | Slovakia U19 | 3 | (1) |
| 2019–2022 | Slovakia U21 | 19 | (5) |
- * Club domestic league appearances and goals as of 16 August 2026

Ján Bernát (born 10 January 2001) is a Slovak professional footballer who plays for as a midfielder for Slovak First Football League club Komárno.

== Club career ==
Bernát made his Fortuna Liga debut for Žilina against ViOn Zlaté Moravce during a home fixture on 2 March 2019. He came on about half hour before the end as a replacement for Patrik Myslovič, with the score at 1–1. Žilina eventually took the win after a goal by Filip Balaj.

== International career ==
Bernát was first recognised in a senior national team nomination on 23 May 2022, while still being active in the U21 team although he remained unnominated for June international fixtures following a suspension ahead of a qualifier against Malta. Štefan Tarkovič recognised him as an alternate ahead of four UEFA Nations League fixtures against Belarus, Azerbaijan and Kazakhstan.

== Honours ==
Westerlo

- Belgian First Division B: 2021–22
