= Lithuania national under-17 football team =

National youth association football team

Lithuania Under-17
- Association: Lithuanian Football Federation
- Confederation: UEFA (Europe)
- Head coach: (Lithuania) Dominykas Galkevičius
- FIFA code: LTU
First colours	Second colours

European U-17 Championships
- Appearances: 1 (first in 2028)
- Best result: TBD

FIFA U-17 World Cup
- Appearances: None

The Lithuania national under-17 football team or Lithuania U-17 represents Lithuania in association football at the under-17 youth level, and is controlled by the Lithuanian Football Federation.

The team is for Lithuanian players aged 17 or under at the start of a two-year UEFA European Under-17 Championship cycle, so players appearing for the team can actually be up to 19 years of age. The U-17 team is a feeder to the under-19 and under-21 teams.

== Competition history ==
Prior to Lithuania's independence in 1991, Lithuanian players were eligible for selection to the Soviet Union U-16 team. Following the dissolution of the Soviet Union, the Lithuanian Football Federation was admitted to UEFA as a full member in 1992, and the Lithuania U-16 team played their first competitive matches in the first phase of the qualifying tournament for the 1994 European U-16 Championship. The team's competitive debut came on 30 August 1993 against Wales U-16 and they finished their first qualifying campaign as 3rd out of 3 teams, behind Wales and Iceland.

Although the team has continued to participate in every under-16 and under-17 European Championship qualifying cycle since 1994, the team has never qualified for any of the tournaments.

=== European Championship ===
==== Under-16 format ====
Year	Round	GP	W	D	L	GS	GA
(Republic of Ireland) 1994	did not qualify	–	–	–	–	–	–
(Belgium) 1995	did not qualify	–	–	–	–	–	–
(Austria) 1996	did not qualify	–	–	–	–	–	–
(Germany) 1997	did not qualify	–	–	–	–	–	–
(Scotland) 1998	did not qualify	–	–	–	–	–	–
(Czech Republic) 1999	did not qualify	–	–	–	–	–	–
(Israel) 2000	did not qualify	–	–	–	–	–	–
(England) 2001	did not qualify	–	–	–	–	–	–
Total	0/8	0	0	0	0	0	0

==== Under-17 format ====
Year	Round	GP	W	D	L	GS	GA
(Denmark) 2002	did not qualify	–	–	–	–	–	–
(Portugal) 2003	did not qualify	–	–	–	–	–	–
(France) 2004	did not qualify	–	–	–	–	–	–
(Italy) 2005	did not qualify	–	–	–	–	–	–
(Luxembourg) 2006	did not qualify	–	–	–	–	–	–
(Belgium) 2007	did not qualify	–	–	–	–	–	–
(Turkey) 2008	did not qualify	–	–	–	–	–	–
(Germany) 2009	did not qualify	–	–	–	–	–	–
(Liechtenstein) 2010	did not qualify	–	–	–	–	–	–
(Serbia) 2011	did not qualify	–	–	–	–	–	–
(Slovenia) 2012	did not qualify	–	–	–	–	–	–
(Slovakia) 2013	did not qualify	–	–	–	–	–	–
(Malta) 2014	did not qualify	–	–	–	–	–	–
(Bulgaria) 2015	did not qualify	–	–	–	–	–	–
(Azerbaijan) 2016	did not qualify	–	–	–	–	–	–
(Croatia) 2017	did not qualify	–	–	–	–	–	–
(England) 2018	did not qualify	–	–	–	–	–	–
(Republic of Ireland) 2019	did not qualify	–	–	–	–	–	–
(Estonia) 2020	Cancelled due to COVID-19 pandemic						
(Cyprus) 2021	Cancelled due to COVID-19 pandemic						
(Israel) 2022	did not qualify	–	–	–	–	–	–
(Hungary) 2023	did not qualify	–	–	–	–	–	–
(Cyprus) 2024	did not qualify	–	–	–	–	–	–
(Albania) 2025	did not qualify	–	–	–	–	–	–
(Estonia) 2026	did not qualify	–	–	–	–	–	–
(Latvia) 2027	To be determined						
(Lithuania) 2028	Qualified as host						
(Moldova) 2029	To be determined						
Total	0/23	0	0	0	0	0	0

== Recent results ==
2026

24 March 2026 2026 m. UEFA U-17 Qualification, II round	Malta	1:3	Lithuania	(Bulgaria) Plovdiv
10:00	Denzel Attard 78' (pen.)	Report	Dominykas Zubavičius 40'; Joris Petravičius 88'; Gvidas Valatkevičius 90+2'	Referee: Ozan Ergün (Turkey)

27 March 2026 2026 m. UEFA U-17 Qualification, II round	Lithuania	0:0	Azerbaijan	(Bulgaria) Plovdiv
10:00		Report		Attendance: 45; Referee: Ozan Ergün (Turkey)

30 March 2026 2026 m. UEFA U-17 Qualification, II round	Lithuania	0:3	Bulgaria	(Bulgaria) Pazardzhik, Georgi Benkovski Stadium
12:00		Report	Svetoslav Beykov 1'; Maksimilian Lazarov 66'; Kaloyan Deyanski 84'	Attendance: 300; Referee: Mateo Tozan (Slovenia)

28 June 2026 2026 Under-17 Baltic Cup	Lithuania	1:5	Latvia	(Finland) Jari Litmanen Areena, Eerikkilä
17:00	Gvidas Valatkevičius 57'	Report	Miroslavs Mogiļevičs 45'; Daņila Sļusarevs 52'; Loiks Mballa 55'; Zahars Maligins 73'; Edvards Gross 89'	Attendance: 48; Referee: Henrik Sandmark (Finland)

30 June 2026 2026 Under-17 Baltic Cup	Lithuania	1:1	Finland	(Finland) Eerikkilä treniņcentrs
17:00	Simas Šiaudvytis 43'	Report	Milton Käld 79'

2 July 2026 2026 Under-17 Baltic Cup	Estonia	1:4	Lithuania	(Finland) Eerikkilä treniņcentrs
11:00	Karl Johann Haabma 29'	Report	Lukas Korvel 42', 51'; Matas Mirončikas 54'; Justas Šluta 61'

8 September 2026 International friendly	Lithuania	0:0	Cyprus	(Lithuania) LSC Sports Complex "Druskininkai" Stadium, Druskininkai
17:00		Report		Referee: Artiom Spelman (Lithuania)

10 September 2026 International friendly	Lithuania	1:2	Cyprus	(Lithuania) LSC Sports Complex "Druskininkai" Stadium, Druskininkai
13:00	Eligijus Merliūnas 56'	Report	Anastasis Glafkou 26'; Constantinos Christofi 68'	Referee: Justas Kamarauskas (Lithuania)

2025

28 October 2025 2026 UEFA U-17 Qualification, I round	Sweden	2:0	Lithuania	(Scotland) Cumbernauld
	Alexander Odefalk 28'; Rayan Bardghji 79'

31 October 2025 2026 UEFA U-17 Qualification, I round	England	0:1	Lithuania	(Scotland) Cumbernauld
			Tomas Jonyla 17'

3 November 2025 2026 UEFA U-17 Qualification, I round	Scotland	4:1	Lithuania	(Scotland) Airdrie
	Cadamarteri 6' 27' (11 m.) 39'; Aaron Thomson 82'		Vėjas Pocius 59'

== Past results ==
2016-2024 results

26 June 2024 2024 Baltic Cup	Latvia	2:2	Lithuania	(Latvia) Riga, Jāņa Skrēdeļa stadionas
	Nils Voitiškis 29'; Nikita Doroņins 48'		Rodion Piazenko 5'; Dovas Grudzinskas 20'

28 June 2024 2024 Baltic Cup	Finland	2:3	Lithuania	(Latvia) Riga, Rigas Daugavgrivas stadionas
	Osagie Okungbowa 25'; Samuel Ramos 90+1' (11 m.)		Rodion Piazenko 29' 70' (11 m.); Dominykas Taučas 55'

30 June 2024 2024 Baltic Cup	Estonia	0:5	Lithuania	(Latvia) Riga, Rigas Daugavgrivas stadionas
			Tomas Jonyla 9'; Rodion Piazenko 11'; Dominykas Taučas 16' (11 m.); Grant Emerhi 90'; Carmine Mennea 90+3'

11 August 2024 International friendly	Lithuania	8:0	Liechtenstein	(Lithuania) Jonava, Jonavos centrinis stadionas
	Dovydas Balsys 17'; Rodion Piazenko 20' 51'; Dovas Grudzinskas 40' (11 m.); Rafal Chverenec 70'; Carmine Mennea 73' 75' (11 m.) 81'

13 August 2024 International friendly	Lithuania	9:0	Liechtenstein	(Lithuania) Kaunas, LFF Kauno treniruočių centras
	Dovas Grudzinskas 8'; Klemensas Gustas 24'; Manoel Honorio 37' (o.g.); Norbert Diugevič 40'; Carmine Mennea 42'; Rafal Chverenec 55'; Rodion Piazenko 70' 83'; Grant Emerhi 86'

14 September 2024 International friendly	Lithuania	3:1	Malta	(Lithuania) Kaunas, LFF Kauno treniruočių centras
	Simas Grabauskas 9' 50'; Justas Rakauskas 13'		Jack Camilleri 63'

16 September 2024 International friendly	Lithuania	4:1	Malta	(Lithuania) Kaunas, LFF Kauno treniruočių centras
	Grant Ochuko Emerhi 2'; Jugas Turčinskas 18'; Rodion Piazenko 37'; Karolis Kuodis 47'		Matteo Paolo Grech 36'

29 October 2024 2025 UEFA U-17 Qualification	Republic of Ireland	2–2	Lithuania	(Northern Ireland) Inver Park, Larne
13:00	Brody 32'; M. Noonan 49'	Report	Mennea 79', 84'	Referee: Peiman Simani (Finland)

1 November 2024 2025 UEFA U-17 Qualification	Scotland	2–1	Lithuania	(Northern Ireland) Seaview Stadium, Belfast
13:00	Boyd 25' (pen.); Hislop 41'	Report	Piazenko 74'	Referee: Peiman Simani (Finland)

4 November 2024 2025 UEFA U-17 Qualification	Lithuania	3–1	Northern Ireland	(Northern Ireland) Seaview Stadium, Belfast
16:00	Piazenko 12'; Grudzinskas 34' (pen.); Buikus 67'	Report	McGovern 90'	Referee: Stefan Ebner (Austria)

14 October 2023 2024 UEFA U17 Qualification	Georgia	1:1	Lithuania	(Georgia (country)) Kutaisi, Ramaz Shengelia stadium
	Reziko Danelia 5'		Ernestas Januš Zdanovič 85'	Referee: Jamie Robinson

14 October 2023 2024 UEFA U17 Qualification	Lithuania	0:1	Austria	(Georgia (country)) Tskaltubo, Tskaltubo techninical centre stadium
			Adrian Riegel 90+1'	Referee: Patrik Kolarić

11 October 2023 2024 UEFA U17 Qualification	Lithuania	1:4	Denmark	(Georgia (country)) Tskaltubo, Tskaltubo techninical centre stadium
	Nedas Garbaliauskas 13' (11 m)		Jonathan Moalem 17'; Chidozie Obi 17'; Olti Hyseni 30'; Lasse Abildgaard 90+4'	Referee: Erkan Özdamar

16 September 2023 International friendly	Lithuania	1:0	Armenia	(Armenia) Yerevan, Armenian football federation techninical centre stadium
	Nedas Garbaliauskas 58'

14 September 2023 International friendly	Lithuania	1:1	Armenia	(Armenia) Yerevan, Armenian football federation techninical centre stadium
	Matas Ambrazaitis 70'		Gagik Melojan 77'	Referee: Ašot Harutiunian

24 August 2023 International friendly	Lithuania	0:4	Slovakia	(Slovakia) Senec, NTC stadium
			Martin Bacik 20'; Dominik Balog 30'; Simon Vlna 58' (11 m); Samuel Kovacik 86'

22 August 2023 International friendly	Lithuania	1:2	Slovakia	(Slovakia) Senec, NTC stadium
	Nedas Garbaliauskas 2'		Karol Blaško 88' 90+2'	Referee: Tomaš Batiz

28 June 2023 2023 Baltic Cup	Lithuania	2:4	Estonia	(Lithuania) Jonavos centrinis stadionas
	Jevgeni Tsernjakov 25' (o.g.); Emilis Kirliauskas 73'		Patrik Kristal 4' (11 m); Tony Varjund 36' 74'; Mait Eenmaa 88'	Referee: Irmantas Kaprasovas

30 June 2023 2023 Baltic Cup	Lithuania	1:3	Finland	(Lithuania) Jonavos centrinis stadionas
	Nedas Garbaliauskas 13'		Ilari Kangasniemi 45'; Arttu Tulehmo 65'; Toivo Mero 90+2'	Referee: Saulius Karka

2 July 2023 2023 Baltic Cup	Lithuania	2:0	Latvia	(Lithuania) Jonavos centrinis stadionas
	Nedas Garbaliauskas 15' 40'			Referee: Vytenis Kazlauskas

October 31, 2022 2023 UEFA U-17 Qualification	Georgia	3:0	Lithuania	Rustavi, Georgia
	Avtandil Mašava 32' 32'; Teimuraz Odikadze 83' 89'

October 28, 2022 2023 UEFA U-17 Qualification	Israel	1:1	Lithuania	Tbilisi, Georgia
	Karem Zoabi 37'		6' Lukas Jonaitis

October 25, 2022 2023 UEFA U-17 Qualification	England	3:1	Lithuania	Tbilisi, Georgia
	Michael Golding 17' 51'; Ethan Nwaneri 81'		80' Mantas Malatokas

September 15, 2022 Friendly	Lithuania	2:2	Slovakia	Jonava, Lithuania
	Adrian Lickūnas 16'; Ernestas Januš Zdanovič 16'		9' Šimon Faško; 13' Nino Žiga

September 13, 2022 Friendly	Lithuania	0:2	Slovakia	Kaunas, Lithuania
			44' Leopold Mizerák; 76' František Kóša

August 10, 2022 preparation camp	Lithuania	1-4	FK Nevėžis
	Karolis Šutovičius

August 9, 2022 preparation camp	Lithuania	0-3	Be1 NFA

3 July 2022 2022 Baltic Cup	Latvia	4:0	Lithuania	Jari Litmanen Areena, Finland
	Roberts Bočs 16' 46'; Daniels Radzenieks 26'; Nojus Vytis Audinis 57' (o.g.)			Referee: Miika Pesonen

1 July 2022 2022 Baltic Cup	Finland	1:0	Lithuania	Jari Litmanen Areena, Finland
	Macar Ajoung 90+2'			Referee: Miika Pesonen

29 June 2022 2022 Baltic Cup	Estonia	3:3	Lithuania	Eerikkilän urheiluopisto, Finland
	Mihhail Jumankin 39'; Gregor Roivassepp 55'; Stevin Kerge 63'		8' Martynas Stūrys; 31' Dominykas Kviklys; 90+4' Emilijus Jermolajev	Referee: Amir Hajizadeh

24 April 2022 UEFA Development Tournament 2022	Guyana	0:5	Lithuania	Mladost Doboj Kakanj, Bosnia and Herzegovina
			1' Artiom Osipovič; 12' Matas Latvys; 19' Emilijus Jermolajev; 66' Rokas Katkauskas; 90' Aurimas Čypas	Referee: Edvin Trakić

21 April 2022 UEFA Development Tournament 2022	Bosnia and Herzegovina	4:0	Lithuania	Bosnia and Herzegovina football federation training centre, Zenica, Bosnia and Herzegovina
	Aleksa Popović 13'; Marko Brekalo 38', 45'; Nedim Keranović 74'

19 April 2022 UEFA Development Tournament 2022	Montenegro	2:0	Lithuania	Mladost Doboj Kakanj, Bosnia and Herzegovina
	Andrej Camaj 11'; Marko Perović 90+7'			Referee: Senad Heljić

~~29 September 2021~~; 31 October 2021 2022 UEFA U17 Qualification	Latvia	4:1	Lithuania	Zemgales Olimpiskais centrs
				Referee: Visar Kastrati

26 September 2021 2022 UEFA U17 Qualification	Czech Republic	4-0	Lithuania	Jāņa Skrēdeļa Stadions
	David Planka 26'; Milos Pudil 71'; Jan Buryan 73' 77'			Referee: Henrik Nalbandyan

23 September 2021 2022 UEFA U17 Qualification	Sweden	8-0	Lithuania	Jāņa Skrēdeļa Stadions
	Jardell Kanga 1'; Roony Bardghji 5'; Fredrik Nissen 9' 32' 43'; Taha Ayari 37'; Vykintas Bazys 82' (o.g.); Montader Madjed 90+1'			Referee: Henrik Nalbandyan

July 4, 2021 2020 Baltic Cup	Estonia	3–2	Lithuania	Männiku staadion
	Tristan Pajo 58'; Ramaz Kardava 68'; Mihkel Sepp 78'		Nidas Vosylius 23'; Romualdas Jansonas 42'	Referee: Tomi Rahula

July 3, 2021 2020 Baltic Cup	Latvia	2–0	Lithuania	Männiku staadion
	Roberts Laurovs 15'; Haralds Silagailis 60'			Referee: Juri Frischer

30 August 2020 International friendly	Latvia	1–1	Lithuania	Zemgales Olimpiskais centrs
	Bruno Melnis 17'		Aurimas Dapkus 37'	Referee: Vasilijs Mordatenko

29 August 2020 International friendly	Lithuania	1–0 (a.e.t.)	Estonia
	Martin Perveinis 41'			Referee: Arturs Vitolins

1 March 2020 International friendly	Lithuania	0–0 (4–3 p)	Georgia	Arena Kombëtare
				Referee: Erjon Bylykbashi

27 February 2020 International friendly	Algeria	1–0 (a.e.t.)	Lithuania	Arena Kombëtare
	?			Referee: Xhulio Agolli

25 February 2020 International friendly	Albania	2–2 (5–3 p)	Lithuania	Arena Kombëtare
	Rrok Toma 69', 92'		Martin Perveinis 13'; Titas Buzas 22'	Referee: Albano Stolaj

3 October 2019 2020 UEFA U17 Qualification	Lithuania	4:1	Faroe Islands	Laröds IP
14:00	Slivka M. 21', Jarusevičius G. 45+1', Dzinga E. 69', Jarusevičius G. 90+1' (pen.)		Hansen S. 57'	Attendance: 107; Referee: Rahim Hasanov

30 September 2019 2020 UEFA U17 Qualification	Denmark	6:1	Lithuania	Laröds IP
14:00	Rasmussen, Højlund, Dall, Rasmussen, Faghir, Bredahl		Jarusevičius	Attendance: 183; Referee: Dragan Petrovic

27 September 2019 2020 UEFA U17 Qualification	Sweden	4:2	Lithuania	Harlyckans IP
16:00	Andersson E. 45' (pen.), Vilhelmsson O. 60', Mattsson L. 64', Andersson E. 81'		Jarusevičius G. 39', Spyčius A. 52'	Attendance: 323; Referee: Igal Frid

26 April 2019 International friendly	Lithuania	0–2	Estonia	Sportland Arena, Tallinn
11:00			Danil Kuraksin 40'; Taaniel Usta 76'	Attendance: 119; Referee: Tanel Üprus

24 April 2019 International friendly	Lithuania	3–0	Liechtenstein
11:00	Philipp Gassner 24' (o.g.); Ervinas Vilkaitis 30'; Titas Buzas 32'			Referee: Kristo Külljastinen

22 April 2019 International friendly	Faroe Islands	0–2	Lithuania	Sportland Arena, Tallinn
13:00			Armandas Kučys 3'; Motiejus Burba 75'	Attendance: 30; Referee: Miko Pupart

28 January 2019 International friendly	Ukraine	0:0	Lithuania
08:00

26 January 2019 International friendly	Lithuania	0:3	Moldova	(Played indoor)
10:00			Zaporozhan D. 8', Danu D. 80+1', Ghiderman I. 80+2'

24 January 2019 International friendly	Lithuania	1:1	Ukraine
08:00	Žebrauskas K. 37'		Shostak V. 6'

22 January 2019 International friendly	Bulgaria	1:1	Lithuania
08:00	Papazov T. 3'		Jarusevičius G. 20'

20 January 2019 International friendly	Slovakia	2:0	Lithuania
07:40	Mojzis A. 2', Matos A. 40+2'

6 October 2018 2019 UEFA U17 Qualification	Lithuania	0–4	Romania	Tersztyánszky Ödön Sportközpont, Budapest
11:30			Ianis Stoica 5'; Louis Munteanu 67'; Alexi Pitu 76' (pen.); Radu Dragusin 84'	Referee: Rohit Saggi

3 October 2018 2019 UEFA U17 Qualification	Hungary	3–0	Lithuania	Globall Football Park & Sporthotel, Budapest
15:00	György Komáromi 24'; Ákos Zuigéber 45' 68' (pen.)			Attendance: 200; Referee: Daniyar Sakhi

30 September 2018 2019 UEFA U17 Qualification	Serbia	2–1	Lithuania	Promontor utcai Stadion, Budapest
15:00	Nikola Colic 53'; Mihajlo Baic 61'		Eimantas Abramavicius 82'	Attendance: 50; Referee: Daniyar Sakhi

19 August 2018 2019 Viktor Banikov Cup	Lithuania	0–2	Israel	Shchaslyve Stadion, Kyiv
			Gabay 27'; Korine 46'	Attendance: 100; Referee: Andrii Goncharuk

18 August 2018 2019 Viktor Banikov Cup	Slovakia	3–0	Lithuania	Obuhiv Stadion, Kyiv
	Mojžiš 4' 59'; Čerepka 57'			Attendance: 200; Referee: Serhii Bupykivskyi

17 August 2018 2019 Viktor Banikov Cup	Ukraine	3–1	Lithuania	Banikov Stadion, Kyiv
	Zabarni 1'; Kovbak 14'; Skorko 34'		Karolis Žebrauskas 59' (pen.)

15 August 2018 2019 Viktor Banikov Cup	Lithuania	1–2	Georgia	Obuhiv Stadion, Kyiv
	Motiejus Burba 16'		Morchiladze 47'; Abuashvili 50'	Attendance: 100

29 June 2018 2018 Baltic Cup	Estonia	2–1	Lithuania	Palangos centrinis stadionas, Palanga
9:00	Erik Kruglov 79' (pen.); Aleks Polkopa 80'		Gustas Jarusevicius 57'

27 June 2018 2018 Baltic Cup	Lithuania	0–2	Latvia	Palangos centrinis stadionas, Palanga
9:00			Dmitrijs Rakuls 38'; Svetoslavs Cugunovs 48'	Attendance: 100; Referee: Mantas Pomeckis

26 June 2018 International friendly	Lithuania	2–3	Finland
9:00	Motiejus Burba 45'; Linas Zingertas 61'		Eetu Rissanen 14' 49'; Jouko Karhunen 29'	Referee: Vijunas Vasiliauskas

25 February 2018 International friendly	Lithuania	0–0	Latvia	ARVI Football Indoor Arena, Marijampolė
10:00				Attendance: 80; Referee: Šarunas Tamulynas

24 January 2018 International friendly	Belgium	1–0	Lithuania	Football Manege (Minsk), Minsk
15:40	Marciano Aziz 60'			Attendance: 470

22 January 2018 International friendly	Lithuania	0–0	Finland	Football Manege (Minsk), Minsk
13:40				Attendance: 280

20 January 2018 International friendly	Belarus	3–0	Lithuania	Football Manege (Minsk), Minsk
23:00	Nikita Kerolidi 37'; Maksim Kapralev 68'; Aleksandr Evtukhovich 75'			Attendance: 1500

29 October 2017 2018 UEFA U17 Qualification	Luxembourg	1–2	Lithuania
15:00	Tun Held 65'		Lukas Juodkunaitis 11'; Vilius Piliukaitis 22'	Referee: Jason Barcelo

26 October 2017 2018 UEFA U17 Qualification	Austria	2–0	Lithuania	Football Centre FRF, Bucharest
13:00	Lukas Schöfl 4'; Martin Moormann 52'			Attendance: 100; Referee: Aleksey Matyunin

23 October 2017 2018 UEFA U17 Qualification	Lithuania	1–2	Romania	Stadionul Mogosoaia, Bucharest
17:00	Ernestas Andriušis 32'		Antonio Vlad 6'; Alexandru Dumitru 26'	Referee: Kai Erik Steen

2 July 2017 International friendly	Estonia	1–0	Lithuania	Eerikkilän urheiluopisto, Tammela
11:00 EET	Mattias Männilaan 35'			Referee: Daniel Enkvist

30 June 2017 International friendly	Lithuania	0–3	Latvia	Eerikkilän urheiluopisto, Tammela
12:00 EET			Deivids Draznieks 16'; Daniels Fedorovics 28'; Maksims Sidorovs 56'	Referee: Jesse Kananen

22 January 2017 2017 Development Cup	Finland	1–2	Lithuania	Football Manege (Minsk), Minsk
14:00 FET	Ollila 42'	Report	Milašius 16'; Petkevičius 18' (pen.)	Attendance: 1,350; Referee: Iliya Lyashuk (Belarus)

21 January 2017 2017 Development Cup	Lithuania	2–4	Belgium	Football Manege (Minsk), Minsk
14:40 FET	Petkevičius 12' (pen.); Dolžnikov 67'	Report	Nganga 37'; Vekemans 42'; Gilis 55'; Rallegri 79'	Attendance: 840; Referee: Vitaly Krivchik (Belarus)

19 January 2017 2017 Development Cup	Israel	0–0	Lithuania	Football Manege (Minsk), Minsk
13:30 FET		Report		Attendance: 240; Referee: Sergei Lobatshevich (Belarus)

17 January 2017 2017 Development Cup	Lithuania	4–1	Georgia	Football Manege (Minsk), Minsk
15:40 FET	Vareika 14'; Bičkus 44'; Petkevičius (yellow card) 75' (red card) 79'; Kodz 76'; Kubilius 80'	Report	Kapianidze 30'	Attendance: 360; Referee: Kirill Lozin (Belarus)

16 January 2017 2017 Development Cup	Ukraine	1–2	Lithuania	Football Manege (Minsk), Minsk
11:00 FET	Chmyryov 80+1'	Report	Marazas 3'; Baulin 19'; Milašius (yellow card) 49' (red card) 77'	Referee: Pavel Yakovenko (Belarus)

11 January 2017 International friendly	Lithuania	2–0	Latvia	ARVI Football Indoor Arena, Marijampolė
12:00 EET	Baulin 8'; Kodz 56'	Report		Attendance: 35; Referee: Robertas Valikonis (Lithuania)

28 September 2016 2017 UEFA U17 Qualification	Lithuania	0–1	Turkey	Alytus Stadium, Alytus
17:00 EEST		Report	Babacan 80+3'	Referee: Dejan Jakimovski (Macedonia)

25 September 2016 2017 UEFA U17 Qualification	Norway	2–1	Lithuania	Alytus Stadium, Alytus
17:00 EEST	Kažukolovas 50' (o.g.); Kalsaas 71' (pen.)	Report	Vareika 51'	Referee: Irfan Peljto (Bosnia and Herzegovina)

23 September 2016 2017 UEFA U17 Qualification	Ukraine	1–1	Lithuania	Alytus Stadium, Alytus
17:00 EEST	Supriaha 60'	Report	Utkus 80+1'	Referee: Dejan Jakimovski (Macedonia)

4 September 2016 International friendly	Lithuania	2–2	Belarus	Alytus Stadium, Alytus
15:00 EEST	Uzėla 12'; Utkus 55'	Report	Lavryk 33'; Kirylenka 59'	Attendance: 65; Referee: Šarūnas Tamulynas (Lithuania)

2 September 2016 International friendly	Lithuania	3–2	Belarus	Alytus Stadium, Alytus
17:00 EEST	Utkus 47' (pen.), 51' (pen.), 62' (pen.)	Report	Matsiash 23'; Kirylenka 43'	Referee: Ugnius Veprauskas (Lithuania)

30 June 2016 2016 Baltic Cup	Lithuania	4:2	Estonia	Sloka
11:00	Bičkus J. 24', Kažukolovas K. 52', Aukštuolis T. 55', Kažukolovas K. 80' (pen.)		Komissarov N. 7', Ostrovski A. 79'	Referee: Artis Kenins

28 June 2016 2016 Baltic Cup	Latvia	2:3	Lithuania	Zemgales Olimpiskais centrs, Jelgava
16:00	Tobers K. 6', Kokins K. 7'		Marazas J. 19', Gudaitis M. 44', Milašius T. 51'	Attendance: 100; Referee: Edgars Malcevs

27 June 2016 2016 Baltic Cup	Finland	1:1	Lithuania
	?		?

20 February 2016 International Friendly	Estonia	1:2	Lithuania	Sportland Arena, Tallinn
10:45	Saar R. 54'		Aukštuolis T. 39' (pen.) 46'	Attendance: 38; Referee: Juri Frischer

18 February 2016 International Friendly	Estonia	1:4	Lithuania	EJL jalgpallihall, Tallinn
13:00	Soomets M. 28' (pen.)		Raudonius D. 37', Aukštuolis T. 41', Vareika M. 46', Milašius T. 70'	Attendance: 25; Referee: Siim Rinken

20 January 2016 2016 Development Cup	Lithuania	0:0	Armenia	Futbolnyi Manezh, Minsk
10:00				Attendance: 150; Referee: Stanislav Ananjev

19 January 2016 2016 Development Cup	Russia	4:1	Lithuania	Futbolnyi Manezh, Minsk
14:30	Isaev O. 18', Grulev V. 36', Gorbulin A. 42', Merenchukov D. 80+2'		Vitkus D. 57'	Attendance: 250

17 January 2016 2016 Development Cup	Lithuania	2:2	Israel	Futbolnyi Manezh, Minsk
12:10	Radžiukynas M. 1', Daškevičius G. 53'		Sharabi Y. 56', Sarsur M. 73'	Attendance: 200; Referee: Amin Kurgkheli

== Players ==
=== Current squad ===
The following players were called up for the friendy matches against Cyprus U-17 in September 2026.

No.	Pos.	Player	Date of birth (age)	Caps	Goals	Club
1	GK	Augustas Ruginis				(Lithuanian Football Federation) FK Žalgiris
12	GK	Domas Petruševičius				(Lithuanian Football Federation) FK Jonava
22	GK	Orestas Sotkevičius				(Lithuanian Football Federation) FK Panevėžys
2	DF	Edvinas Gečevskis				(Lithuanian Football Federation) FM Fortūna
3	DF	Bartas Elzbergas				(Lithuanian Football Federation) Vilnius FA
4	DF	Arėjas Milkintis				(Lithuanian Football Federation) FK Be1
5	DF	Džiugas Varkulevičius				(Lithuanian Football Federation) FA Šiauliai
13	DF	Kajus Undzėnas				(Polish Football Association) Wisła Płock
14	DF	Rojus Kardelis				(Italian Football Federation) Genoa CFC
15	DF	Simas Šiaudvytis				(Lithuanian Football Federation) DFK Dainava
21	DF	Kipras Kazlauskas				(Lithuanian Football Federation) FK Žalgiris
6	MF	Tomas Veikutis				(Lithuanian Football Federation) FM Fortūna
7	MF	Matas Mirončikas				(Lithuanian Football Federation) FK Jonava
8	MF	Rokas Paulauskas				(Norwegian Football Federation) Sandefjord Fotball
10	MF	Kristupas Liutvinas	20 April 2010 (age 16)			(Lithuanian Football Federation) S.L. Benfica
11	MF	Eligijus Merliūnas				(Lithuanian Football Federation) FK Ataka
16	MF	Ugnius Klimavičius				(Lithuanian Football Federation) FK Žalgiris
20	MF	Patryk Vegis				(Lithuanian Football Federation) BFA
23	MF	Natan Molis				(Lithuanian Football Federation) FM Fortūna
9	FW	Lukas Korvel				(Lithuanian Football Federation) BFA
17	FW	Lukas Rickevičius				(Lithuanian Football Federation) BFA
18	FW	Justas Šluta				(Lithuanian Football Federation) FK Be1
19	FW	Vilius Dovidėnas				(Royal Spanish Football Federation) Cultural Leonesa

== Managers ==
- Rolandas Džiaukštas - 2021
- Robert Kilin - 2022
- Andrius Velička - 2023-2024
- Nerijus Mačiulis - 2025
- Dominykas Galkevičius - 2026

== See also ==
- Lithuania national football team
- Lithuania national under-21 football team
- Lithuania national under-19 football team
