= Titas Buzas =

Lithuanian footballer (born 2004)

Personal information
- Date of birth: 14 June 2004 (age 22)
- Place of birth: Marijampolė, Lithuania
- Height: 1.73 m (5 ft 8 in)
- Position: Attacking midfielder

Team information
- Current team: FC Hegelmann
- Number: 24

Youth career
- –2020: Belenenses
- 2022–: Augsburg

Senior career*
Years	Team	Apps	(Gls)
2020–2021	Dainava	3	(0)
2021–2022	Dynamo Kyiv	0	(0)
2022	→ Jonava (loan)	9	(0)
2022	Augsburg	0	(0)
2022	→ Augsburg U19	0	(0)
2023	Riteriai	2	(0)
2024–	FC Hegelmann	7	(0)

International career^{‡}
2019	Lithuania U17	3	(1)
2021	Lithuania U18	2	(0)
2021	Lithuania U19	3	(0)
- * Club domestic league appearances and goals as of 11 November 2024 ‡ National team caps and goals as of 10 February 2022

Titas Buzas (Lithuanian: Titas Buzas; born 14 June 2004) is a Lithuanian professional footballer who plays as an attacking midfielder for FC Hegelmann.

He played for DFK Dainava in First League until 2021. In the summer of 2021, he left Alytus and moved to Ukraine to play for the youth team of Dynamo Kyiv.

In 2022, he returned to Lithuania to play for FK Jonava. In June, he left Jonava.
