= Maximo Tolonen =

Finnish footballer (born 2001)

Personal information
- Date of birth: 4 March 2001 (age 25)
- Place of birth: Espoo, Finland
- Position: Midfielder

Team information
- Current team: PK-35
- Number: 19

Youth career
- Rangers
- Hibernian
- Honka

Senior career*
Years	Team	Apps	(Gls)
2016–2017	Honka	25	(2)
2018–2019	SJK	30	(1)
2018–2019	SJK II	14	(8)
2020	IFK Mariehamn	20	(0)
2021	Ilves	0	(0)
2021–2023	Gnistan	66	(5)
2024	KäPa	25	(3)
2025–	PK-35	41	(5)
- * Club domestic league appearances and goals as of 18 October 2026

Maximo Tolonen (born 4 March 2001) is a Finnish professional footballer who plays as a midfielder for Ykkösliiga club PK-35.

== Career ==
Tolonen was born to a Finnish father and an Argentine mother. He grew up in Espoo, but moved to Cambridge in England when he was five years old. The family lived for one-and-a-half years in Cambridge before moving back to Espoo. Tolonen is fluent in Finnish, Spanish because his mother is Argentine, and English because he lived in England and Scotland.

At the age of 10, in 2011, Tolonen moved to Scotland with his family. He began playing for Rangers. The club later offered him a contract, but he declined, because it was to far away from where he lived in Edinburgh. He then moved to Hibernian. Two years later, the Tolonen family moved back to Finland and joined FC Honka.

He left SJK at the end of the 2019 season. On 3 December 2019, it was confirmed that Tolonen would join IFK Mariehamn for the 2020 season, signing a one-year deal with an option for one further year.
