= Eetu Pellikka =

Finnish footballer (born 2000)

Personal information
- Date of birth: 23 February 2000 (age 26)
- Place of birth: Finland
- Position: Forward

Youth career
- KuPS

Senior career*
Years	Team	Apps	(Gls)
2017–2020	KuPS	10	(0)
2017	→ KuFu-98 (loan)	15	(2)
2018	→ KuFu-98 (loan)	18	(3)
2019–2020	→ KuFu-98 (loan)	18	(7)
2020	EIF	0	(0)
2020	MyPa	11	(0)
2021–2024	HJS	64	(4)

International career
2017	Finland U17	10	(3)
2017–2018	Finland U18	6	(1)
2017–2018	Finland U19	4	(0)
- * Club domestic league appearances and goals

Eetu Pellikka (born 23 February 2000) is a Finnish football player who played in the Veikkausliiga for KuPS as forward. He later played for clubs including KuFu-98 and MyPa. He signed for EIF at the age of 20 in August 2020. He later joined HJS and played for them across multiple seasons, signing a year's contract extension at the end of 2023. He is a third generation professional footballer, with his father Anssi and grandfather Ensio having played for KuPS.
