= Matěj Majka =

Czech footballer

Personal information
- Full name: Matěj Majka
- Date of birth: 31 January 2000 (age 26)
- Place of birth: Sokolov, Czech Republic
- Height: 1.72 m (5 ft 8 in)
- Position: Winger

Team information
- Current team: FK Olympie Březová
- Number: 28

Youth career
- –2018: Sparta Prague
- 2018–2020: Brentford

Senior career*
Years	Team	Apps	(Gls)
2020–2021	FC MAS Táborsko	19	(1)
2021–2023	FK Baník Sokolov	26	(1)
2021–2022	FK Baník Sokolov B	6	(6)
2023–2025	SV Mitterteich	44	(3)
2025–	FK Olympie Březová	34	(2)

International career
2015	Czech Republic U15	2	(0)
2016	Czech Republic U16	10	(1)
2016–2017	Czech Republic U17	9	(2)
2018	Czech Republic U18	6	(0)
2017	Czech Republic U19	1	(0)
- * Club domestic league appearances and goals as of 21:52, 30 July 2026 (UTC)

Matěj Majka (born 31 January 2000) is a Czech semi-professional footballer who plays as a winger for Czech Fourth Division club FK Olympie Březová.

Majka is a product of the Sparta Prague academy and began his professional career in England with Brentford. He failed to break into the first team squad and following his release in 2020, he played lower league football in the Czech Republic and Germany. Majka was capped by the Czech Republic at youth level.

== Club career ==
=== Sparta Prague ===
A winger, Majka entered the Sparta Prague academy at age 14 and progressed sufficiently to be awarded the Vlastislav Mareček Award at the 2016 FAČR Grassroots Gala. He was an unused substitute for the first team on two occasions during the 2016–17 season and appeared for the U19 team in Sparta's 2016–17 and 2017–18 UEFA Youth League campaigns. Majka departed the Stadion Letná when his contract expired in June 2018.

=== Brentford ===
In August 2018, Majka moved to England to sign a two-year contract with the B team at Championship club Brentford on a free transfer, with the option of a further year. During his two seasons with the club, Majka made 62 B team appearances, scored five goals and was part of the squad which won the 2018–19 Middlesex Senior Cup. He was released in June 2020, when the club opted not to take up the option on his contract.

=== Return to the Czech Republic ===
In August 2020, Majka signed a two-year contract with newly promoted Czech National League club FC MAS Táborsko on a free transfer. He made 20 appearances and scored one goal during the 2020–21 season. Majka departed the club during the 2021 off-season and on 16 September 2021, he signed a contract with hometown Bohemian League A club FK Baník Sokolov. Majka made 26 appearances and scored one goal prior to departing the club in January 2023.

=== SV Mitterteich ===
In January 2023, Majka transferred to German Landesliga Bayern-Nordost club SV Mitterteich. He made 45 appearances and scored three goals prior to his departure in February 2025.

=== FK Olympie Březová ===
In February 2025, Majka transferred to Czech Fourth Division club FK Olympie Březová. He made 14 appearances and scored goal during the remainder of a 2024–25 season in which the club narrowly avoided relegation. Majka made 20 appearances and scored one goal during a 2025–26 season in which the club suffered relegation.

== International career ==
Majka was capped by the Czech Republic between U15 and U19 level.

== Career statistics ==
As of match played 16 May 2026

Appearances and goals by club, season and competition
Club	Season	League			National cup (Note: Includes Czech Cup)		Europe		Other		Total	
Club	Season	Division	Apps	Goals	Apps	Goals	Apps	Goals	Apps	Goals	Apps	Goals
Sparta Prague	2016–17	Czech First League	0	0	0	0	0	0	—		0	0
FC MAS Táborsko	2020–21	Czech National League	19	1	1	0	—		—		20	1
FK Baník Sokolov	2021–22	Bohemian League A	15	1	—		—		—		15	1
FK Baník Sokolov	2022–23	Bohemian League A	11	0	—		—		—		11	0
FK Baník Sokolov	Total		26	1	—		—		—		26	1
FK Baník Sokolov B	2021–22	Regional Championship Karlovy Vary I.B	5	6	—		—		—		5	6
FK Baník Sokolov B	2022–23	Regional Championship Karlovy Vary I.A	1	0	—		—		—		1	0
FK Baník Sokolov B	Total		6	6	—		—		—		6	6
SV Mitterteich	2022–23	Landesliga Bayern-Nordost	4	0	—		—		1 (Note: Appearance in Bavarian Toto Cup qualifying)	0	5	0
SV Mitterteich	2023–24	Landesliga Bayern-Nordost	26	3	—		—		—		26	3
SV Mitterteich	2024–25	Landesliga Bayern-Nordost	14	0	—		—		—		14	0
SV Mitterteich	Total		44	3	—		—		1	0	45	3
FK Olympie Březová	2024–25	Czech Fourth Division B	14	1	—		—		—		14	1
FK Olympie Březová	2025–26	Czech Fourth Division B	20	1	—		—		—		20	1
FK Olympie Březová	Total		34	2	—		—		—		34	2
Career total			129	13	1	0	0	0	1	0	131	13

== Honours ==
Czech Republic U18

- La Manga Tournament: 2018

Brentford B

- Middlesex Senior Cup: 2018–19

FK Baník Sokolov B

- Regional Championship Karlovy Vary I.B: 2021–22

Individual

- FAČR Grassroots Gala Vlastislav Mareček Award: 2016
