= Yury Muzychenka =

Belarusian footballer

Personal information
- Date of birth: 31 January 2000 (age 26)
- Place of birth: Dobrush, Gomel Oblast, Belarus
- Height: 1.81 m (5 ft 11 in)
- Position: Forward

Team information
- Current team: Soligorsk
- Number: 97

Youth career
- 2014–2019: Gomel

Senior career*
Years	Team	Apps	(Gls)
2019–2021	Gomel	19	(0)
2019	→ Sputnik Rechitsa (loan)	28	(3)
2021	Vitebsk	3	(0)
2022–2025	Lokomotiv Gomel	120	(5)
2026–	Soligorsk	1	(0)

International career
2016–2017	Belarus U17	6	(2)
- * Club domestic league appearances and goals as of 4 April 2026

Yury Muzychenka (Belarusian: Юрый Музычэнка; Russian: Юрий Музыченко; born 31 January 2000) is a Belarusian footballer who plays for Soligorsk.
