= Gonçalo Costa =

Portuguese footballer

Personal information
- Full name: Gonçalo Faria Costa
- Date of birth: 18 February 2000 (age 26)
- Place of birth: Setúbal, Portugal
- Height: 1.79 m (5 ft 10 in)
- Position: Left-back

Team information
- Current team: Estoril
- Number: 20

Youth career
- 2007–2009: Os Amarelos
- 2009–2021: Sporting CP

Senior career*
Years	Team	Apps	(Gls)
2021–2022	Sporting CP B	25	(2)
2022–2024	Portimonense	42	(0)
2024–	Estoril	34	(2)

International career^{‡}
2015–2016	Portugal U16	4	(0)
2016–2017	Portugal U17	9	(1)
- * Club domestic league appearances and goals as of 25 May 2026 ‡ National team caps and goals as of 23 December 2022

Gonçalo Faria Costa (born 18 February 2000) is a Portuguese professional footballer who plays as a left-back for Primeira Liga club Estoril.

== Professional career ==
Costa is a youth product of the academy of Os Amarelos and Sporting CP. He worked his way up Sporting's youth teams, before joining their U23 side in 2021. On 22 June 2022, he transferred to Portimonense for the 2022-23 season.

He made his professional and Primeira Liga debut with Portimonense as a starter in a 4–0 loss against his childhood club Sporting CP on 10 September 2022.

On 31 July 2024, Costa signed a four-year contract with Estoril.

== International career ==
Costa is a youth international for Portugal, having played up to the Portugal U17s.
