= Titas Milašius =

Lithuanian footballer

Personal information
- Date of birth: 12 December 2000 (age 25)
- Place of birth: Vilnius, Lithuania
- Height: 1.78 m (5 ft 10 in)
- Position: Midfielder

Team information
- Current team: Sūduva
- Number: 23

Youth career
- Vilniaus Futbolo Mokykla
- 2011–2013: FCB Escola Varsovia
- 2013–2015: Nacionalinę futbolo akademiją
- 2013–2016: Vilniaus Futbolo Mokykla
- 2016–2019: FCB Escola Varsovia

Senior career*
Years	Team	Apps	(Gls)
2017–2019	FCB Escola Varsovia	7	(1)
2019–2021	Wisła Płock	1	(0)
2020	→ Świt NDM (loan)	1	(0)
2021	→ Skra Częstochowa (loan)	16	(1)
2021–2024	Podbeskidzie Bielsko-Biała	52	(1)
2024–2025	Pogoń Siedlce	37	(2)
2025–	Sūduva	20	(0)

International career^{‡}
2016–2017	Lithuania U17	7	(2)
2017	Lithuania U19	3	(0)
2018–2022	Lithuania U21	21	(1)
2022–	Lithuania	11	(0)
- * Club domestic league appearances and goals as of 22 June 2026 (UTC) ‡ National team caps and goals as of 10:51, 13 June 2025 (UTC)

Titas Milašius (born 12 December 2000) is a Lithuanian professional footballer who plays as a midfielder for A Lyga club Sūduva and the Lithuania national team.

== Youth career ==
At the age of 11, he traveled to Warsaw where he enrolled into Barcelona-affiliated Escola Varsovia Academy. After a few years, he returned to Lithuania for a short while to represent Vilniaus Futbolo Mokykla and Nacionalinę futbolo akademiją (NFA), before rejoining Escola Varsovia in 2016.

== Club career ==
=== Wisła Płock ===
After training with Wisła Płock for over a month in the winter 2019, the club confirmed on 25 February 2019 that Milašius would be joining them for the upcoming season, signing a pre-contract until the summer 2022. On 11 February 2020, Wisła announced that Milašius had been loaned out to Świt Nowy Dwór Mazowiecki in the Polish fourth league for the rest of the season. He returned to Wisła in June 2020, but was loaned out again in January 2021, this time to Skra Częstochowa for the rest of the season.

=== FK Sūduva ===
On 10 September 2025 FK Sūduva announced about agreement with Titas Milašius.

On 12 September 2025 Titas Milašius made his debut in A Lyga against FK Panevėžys.

== Career statistics ==
=== International ===
As of match played 10 June 2025

Appearances and goals by national team and year
National team	Year	Apps	Goals
Lithuania
Lithuania	2022	5	0
Lithuania	2024	3	0
Lithuania	2025	3	0
Total		11	0

== Honours ==
Pogoń Siedlce

- II liga: 2023–24
