= Jusif Ali =

Sudanese footballer (born 2000)

Personal information
- Full name: Jusif Joose Ali
- Date of birth: 4 May 2000 (age 26)
- Place of birth: Espoo, Finland
- Height: 1.74 m (5 ft 9 in)
- Position: Left winger

Team information
- Current team: Al-Merrikh

Youth career
- LePa
- Espoo
- HJK

Senior career*
Years	Team	Apps	(Gls)
2016–2017	Klubi 04	24	(5)
2018–2019	Ilves	3	(0)
2018	→ JJK (loan)	5	(0)
2018–2019	→ Dinamo Zagreb II (loan)	0	(0)
2019–2020	Pafos	0	(0)
2020	AC Oulu	5	(0)
2021–2022	HIFK	50	(5)
2023	Lahti	12	(0)
2023	→ Reipas Lahti	3	(0)
2024	LePa/Via Alberga	10	(13)
2025–	Al-Merrikh		

International career^{‡}
2017	Finland U17	6	(2)
2023–	Sudan	3	(0)
- * Club domestic league appearances and goals as of 19 November 2023 ‡ National team caps and goals as of 17:28, 29 April 2024 (UTC)

Jusif Joose Ali (born 4 May 2000) is a footballer who plays for Al-Merrikh in the Super D1. Born in Finland, Ali plays for the Sudan national team.

== Club career ==
Ali spent his early career with Klubi 04, FC Ilves and JJK. In August 2018, 18-year old Ali moved on loan to Dinamo Zagreb with an option to buy.

Ali then went on a one-week trial at Slovenian club NK Aluminij, before Cypriot club Pafos FC offered him a contract. He joined the club in September 2019 and was registered for the club's U21 squad. Ali scored five goals in 18 games for the youth teams of the club.

Ali returned to Finland and on 6 September 2020, he signed with Ykkönen club AC Oulu.

On 18 January 2021, Ali signed for HIFK.

On 28 November 2022, Ali signed a contract with Lahti for the 2023 season.

In 2024 he began playing for LePa/Via Alberga, in Kutonen, the Finnish eight-tier.

In January 2025, Ali signed with Sudanese club Al-Merrikh, competing in Mauritanian Super D1.

== International career ==
Born and raised in Finland, Ali has a Sudanese father, He is a former youth international for Finland. He received his first call-up to the Sudan national team in 2023. He debuted with Sudan in a 1–0 2026 FIFA World Cup qualification win over DR Congo on 19 November 2023.

== Personal life ==
Ali is a devout Muslim.
