= Filston Mawana =

Swedish footballer

Personal information
- Full name: Filston Mawana
- Date of birth: 21 March 2000 (age 26)
- Place of birth: DR Congo
- Height: 1.69 m (5 ft 7 in)
- Position: Forward

Team information
- Current team: Växjö Norra IF
- Number: 21

Youth career
- 2009–2016: Malmö FF
- 2017–2018: 1899 Hoffenheim

Senior career*
Years	Team	Apps	(Gls)
2018–2019	1899 Hoffenheim	0	(0)
2018	→ 1899 Hoffenheim II	1	(0)
2019–2021	Hammarby IF	0	(0)
2019–2020	→ IK Frej (loan)	17	(6)
2021	→ Hammarby TFF (res.)	2	(0)
2022	Åtvidabergs FF	21	(2)
2023	IFK Malmö	15	(3)
2023	FC Rosengård 1917	3	(3)
2024	Husqvarna FF	25	(10)
2025	BK Olympic	9	(0)
2025–2026	NK Dubrava	3	(0)
2026–	Växjö Norra IF		

International career^{‡}
2015–2017	Sweden U17	21	(14)
2017	Sweden U19	3	(3)
- * Club domestic league appearances and goals as of 6 December 2025 ‡ National team caps and goals as of 24 September 2017

Filston Mawana (born 21 March 2000) is a Swedish footballer who plays as a forward for Växjö Norra IF.

== Early life ==
Mawana was born in Democratic Republic of the Congo, but moved to Sweden and the city of Malmö together with his family in 2006.

== Career ==
=== Youth years ===
He started to play football with local club Malmö FF at nine years old after only playing street football beforehand, and was first called up to the Swedish national under 17-team in 2015.

In December 2016, Mawana transferred to 1899 Hoffenheim, signing a four-and-a-half-year contract. He impressed in the youth system of the Bundesliga club and in 2017 The Guardian rated him as one of the 60 most promising football players in Europe born in 2000. Reportedly, Mawana attracted interest from clubs like Bayern Munich, Arsenal, Chelsea and Juventus.

He made his senior debut for 1899 Hoffenheim II in the Regionalliga Südwest on 12 May 2018, coming on as a substitute in a 3–0 win against VfB Stuttgart II. However, Mawana suffered a serious cruciate ligament injury during a training session the following summer.

=== Hammarby ===
On 19 March 2019, Mawana returned to Sweden, signing a three-year contract with Hammarby IF. He spent the first half of the season nursing his knee injury, but made his competitive debut for Hammarby on 21 August, coming on as a substitute in a 3–1 away win against IFK Luleå in the Svenska Cupen. During the fall of 2019, he went out on loan to IK Frej in Superettan, Sweden's second tier. Mawana scored a brace, his first senior goals, for the club in a 3–0 win against Syrianska FC on 14 September.

=== Åtvidabergs FF ===
On 17 February 2022, Mawana joined Åtvidabergs FF in Ettan, Sweden's third tier, after terminating his contract with Hammarby following three seasons plagued by injuries.

== Career statistics ==
=== Club ===
As of 17 February 2022

Club	Season	League			Cup		Continental		Total	
Club	Season	Division	Apps	Goals	Apps	Goals	Apps	Goals	Apps	Goals
1899 Hoffenheim II	2017–18	Regionalliga	1	0	0	0	—		1	0
1899 Hoffenheim II	Total		1	0	0	0	0	0	1	0
Hammarby IF	2019	Allsvenskan	0	0	1	0	—		1	0
Hammarby IF	Total		0	0	1	0	0	0	1	0
IK Frej (loan)	2019	Superettan	10	3	0	0	—		10	3
IK Frej (loan)	2020	Ettan	7	3	0	0	—		7	3
Hammarby TFF (loan)	2021	Ettan	2	0	0	0	—		2	0
Total			19	6	0	0	0	0	19	6
Åtvidabergs FF	2022	Ettan	0	0	0	0	—		0	0
Career total			20	6	1	0	0	0	21	6
