= Emil Kalsaas =

Norwegian footballer (born 2000)

Personal information
- Date of birth: 7 April 2000 (age 26)
- Height: 1.73 m (5 ft 8 in)
- Position: Defender

Youth career
- –2015: Fyllingsdalen
- 2018: Brann

Senior career*
Years	Team	Apps	(Gls)
2016–2017	Fyllingsdalen	26	(0)
2019–2020	Brann	1	(0)
2020	→ Åsane (loan)	26	(1)
2021–	Åsane	0	(0)

International career
2016	Norway U16	12	(1)
2017	Norway U17	11	(1)
2016	Norway U18	4	(0)
2019	Norway U19	2	(0)
- * Club domestic league appearances and goals as of 23 December 2020

Emil Kalsaas (born 7 April 2000) is a Norwegian football defender who plays for Åsane.

He started his career in FK Fyllingsdalen, playing on the senior team in 2016 and 2017 before joining the junior team of SK Brann in 2018. He was also a prolific Norway youth international player. Kalsaas made his senior Brann debut in the 2019 Norwegian Football Cup against Arne-Bjørnar, and made his Eliteserien debut in October 2019 against Bodø/Glimt. In 2020 he was loaned out to Åsane for the entire season. His contract with Brann expired after the 2020 season and was not renewed.
