= 1987 UEFA European Under-16 Championship qualifying =

Football tournament qualification stage

This page describes the qualifying procedure for the 1987 UEFA European Under-16 Football Championship. 29 teams were divided into 14 groups (13 groups of two teams and one group of three teams) each. The fourteen group winners advanced to the final tournament. The runner-up of the group with three teams and France (as host) were also qualified.

== Results ==
=== Group 1 ===
Team	Pld	W	D	L	GF	GA	GD	Pts
Portugal	2	1	0	1	3	1	+2	2
Romania	2	1	0	1	1	3	−2	2

March 25, 1987

Romania	1–0	Portugal

Plopeni

April 8, 1987

Portugal	3–0	Romania

Oeiras

=== Group 2 ===
Team	Pld	W	D	L	GF	GA	GD	Pts
West Germany	2	1	1	0	4	2	+2	3
Spain	2	0	1	1	2	4	−2	1

March 25, 1987

West Germany	2–0	Spain

Gütersloh

April 8, 1987

Spain	2–2	West Germany

Coria del Río

=== Group 3 ===
Team	Pld	W	D	L	GF	GA	GD	Pts
Israel	2	2	0	0	3	0	+3	4
Belgium	2	0	0	2	0	3	−3	0

March 4, 1987

Israel	1–0	Belgium

Herzliya

March 25, 1987

Belgium	0–2	Israel

Ciney

=== Group 4 ===
Team	Pld	W	D	L	GF	GA	GD	Pts
Italy	2	2	0	0	8	1	+7	4
Switzerland	2	0	0	2	1	8	−7	0

November 26, 1986

Switzerland	1–4	Italy

Delémont

April 1, 1987

Italy	4–0	Switzerland

Cuneo

=== Group 5 ===
Team	Pld	W	D	L	GF	GA	GD	Pts
Greece	2	1	0	1	4	3	+1	2
Netherlands	2	1	0	1	3	4	−1	2

November 26, 1986

Greece	4–0	Netherlands

Argos

March 17, 1987

Netherlands	3–0	Greece

Almelo

=== Group 6 ===
Team	Pld	W	D	L	GF	GA	GD	Pts
East Germany	2	1	1	0	3	2	+1	3
Iceland	2	0	1	1	2	3	−1	1

October 4, 1986

Iceland	1–2	East Germany

Reykjavík

October 28, 1986

East Germany	1–1	Iceland

Freiberg

=== Group 7 ===
Team	Pld	W	D	L	GF	GA	GD	Pts
Northern Ireland	2	1	0	1	1	1	0	2
Republic of Ireland	2	1	0	1	1	1	0	2

November 18, 1986

Republic of Ireland	1–0	Northern Ireland

Dublin

March 10, 1987

Northern Ireland	1–0	Republic of Ireland
Penalties
	5–4

Belfast

=== Group 8 ===
Team	Pld	W	D	L	GF	GA	GD	Pts
Norway	2	1	0	1	4	4	0	2
Finland	2	1	0	1	4	4	0	2

September 28, 1986

Norway	1–2	Finland

Ålesund

October 12, 1986

Finland	2–3	Norway

Mariehamn

=== Group 9 ===
Team	Pld	W	D	L	GF	GA	GD	Pts
Scotland	2	1	1	0	1	0	+1	3
Hungary	2	0	1	1	0	1	−1	1

October 26, 1986

Hungary	0–1	Scotland

Budapest

November 18, 1986

Scotland	0–0	Hungary

Kilmarnock

=== Group 10 ===
Team	Pld	W	D	L	GF	GA	GD	Pts
Czechoslovakia	2	2	0	0	8	0	+8	4
Luxembourg	2	0	0	2	0	8	−8	2

November 5, 1986

Luxembourg	0–6	Czechoslovakia

Luxembourg

April 8, 1987

Czechoslovakia	2–0	Luxembourg

Senec

=== Group 11 ===
Team	Pld	W	D	L	GF	GA	GD	Pts
Turkey	2	1	1	0	4	3	+1	3
Sweden	2	0	1	1	3	4	−1	1

October 18, 1986

Sweden	2–3	Turkey

Uppsala

April 5, 1987

Turkey	1–1	Sweden

Adapazarı

=== Group 12 ===
Team	Pld	W	D	L	GF	GA	GD	Pts
Austria	2	1	1	0	2	1	+1	3
Bulgaria	2	0	1	1	1	2	−1	1

October 21, 1986

Austria	0–0	Bulgaria

Hollabrunn

March 29, 1987

Bulgaria	1–2	Austria

Plovdiv

=== Group 13 ===
Team	Pld	W	D	L	GF	GA	GD	Pts
Soviet Union	2	1	1	0	4	1	+3	3
Poland	2	0	1	1	1	4	−3	1

October 14, 1986

Soviet Union	3–0	Poland

Lviv

April 11, 1987

Poland	1–1	Soviet Union

Białystok

=== Group 14 ===
Team	Pld	W	D	L	GF	GA	GD	Pts
Yugoslavia	4	3	1	0	5	0	+5	7
Denmark	4	2	1	1	5	4	+1	5
Cyprus	4	0	0	4	1	7	−6	0

November 5, 1986

Cyprus	0–1	Yugoslavia

Ypsonas

November 11, 1986

Denmark	0–3	Yugoslavia

Hjørring

November 19, 1986

Denmark	3–0	Cyprus

Brøndby

January 7, 1987

Cyprus	1–2	Denmark

Paphos

April 8, 1987

Yugoslavia	0–0	Denmark

Varaždin

April 15, 1987

Yugoslavia	3–0	Cyprus

Sremska Mitrovica
