= 1986 UEFA European Under-16 Championship qualifying =

Football tournament qualification stage

This page describes the qualifying procedure for the 1986 UEFA European Under-16 Football Championship. 28 teams were divided into 13 groups of two and three teams each. The twelve best winners advanced to the final tournament.

== Results ==
=== Group 1 ===
Team	Pld	W	D	L	GF	GA	GD	Pts
Norway	2	1	1	0	3	2	+1	3
Republic of Ireland	2	0	1	1	2	3	−1	1

October 13, 1985

Norway	2–2	Republic of Ireland

Kongsvinger

October 20, 1985

Republic of Ireland	0–1	Norway

Dublin

=== Group 2 ===
Team	Pld	W	D	L	GF	GA	GD	Pts
Denmark	2	1	1	0	1	0	+1	3
Northern Ireland	2	0	1	1	0	1	−1	1

November 5, 1985

Denmark	1–0	Northern Ireland

Horsens

March 11, 1986

Northern Ireland	0–0	Denmark

Belfast

=== Group 3 ===
Team	Pld	W	D	L	GF	GA	GD	Pts
Scotland	2	2	0	0	5	2	+3	4
Iceland	2	0	0	2	2	5	−3	0

September 23, 1985

Iceland	1–2	Scotland

Reykjavík

October 7, 1985

Scotland	3–1	Iceland

Motherwell

=== Group 4 ===
Team	Pld	W	D	L	GF	GA	GD	Pts
Sweden	2	1	1	0	4	2	+2	3
Finland	2	0	1	1	2	4	−2	1

October 2, 1985

Sweden	2–0	Finland

Halmstad

October 23, 1985

Finland	2–2	Sweden

Tuusula

=== Group 5 ===
Team	Pld	W	D	L	GF	GA	GD	Pts
Spain	2	2	0	0	9	0	+9	4
Luxembourg	2	0	0	2	0	9	−9	0

November 13, 1985

Luxembourg	0–5	Spain

North Bonnevoie-Verlorenkost

December 17, 1985

Spain	4–0	Luxembourg

Vilobí d'Onyar

=== Group 6 ===
Team	Pld	W	D	L	GF	GA	GD	Pts
Portugal	4	1	3	0	4	2	+2	5
Netherlands	4	1	2	1	4	5	−1	4
Switzerland	4	1	1	2	3	4	−1	3

October 30, 1985

Switzerland	2–0	Netherlands

Zürich

November 20, 1985

Portugal	2–0	Switzerland

Montijo

November 27, 1985

Netherlands	1–1	Portugal

Wassenaar

December 4, 1985

Netherlands	2–1	Switzerland

Zandvoort

March 12, 1986

Switzerland	0–0	Portugal

Geneva

March 19, 1986

Portugal	1–1	Netherlands

Fafe

=== Group 7 ===
Team	Pld	W	D	L	GF	GA	GD	Pts
France	2	1	1	0	3	1	+2	3
Belgium	2	0	1	1	1	3	−2	1

March 5, 1986

Belgium	0–2	France

Mons

March 19, 1986

France	1–1	Belgium

Dublin

=== Group 8 ===
Team	Pld	W	D	L	GF	GA	GD	Pts
East Germany	4	4	0	0	6	1	+5	6
Czechoslovakia	4	1	0	3	3	5	−2	2
Hungary	4	1	0	3	1	4	−3	2

October 3, 1985

Hungary	1–0	Czechoslovakia

Budapest

October 20, 1985

East Germany	1–0	Hungary

Oranienburg

November 2, 1985

Hungary	0–1	East Germany

Mezőkövesd

November 17, 1985

Czechoslovakia	1–2	East Germany

Hlohovec

March 15, 1986

Czechoslovakia	2–0	Hungary

Písek

March 22, 1986

East Germany	2–0	Czechoslovakia

Grimma

=== Group 9 ===
Team	Pld	W	D	L	GF	GA	GD	Pts
Italy	2	1	0	1	5	4	+1	2
West Germany	2	1	0	1	4	5	−1	2

February 26, 1986

Italy	1–3	West Germany

Caserta

March 12, 1986

West Germany	1–4	Italy

Viersen

=== Group 10 ===
Team	Pld	W	D	L	GF	GA	GD	Pts
Austria	2	1	1	0	7	5	+2	3
Poland	2	0	1	1	5	7	−2	1

October 22, 1985

Austria	2–2	Poland

Zwettl

March 22, 1986

Poland	2–2	Austria
Penalties
	2–4

Bydgoszcz

=== Group 11 ===
Team	Pld	W	D	L	GF	GA	GD	Pts
Soviet Union	2	2	0	0	9	0	+9	4
Cyprus	2	0	0	2	0	9	−9	0

October 30, 1985

Cyprus	0–4	Soviet Union

Limassol

November 20, 1985

Soviet Union	5–0	Cyprus

Tbilisi

=== Group 12 ===
Team	Pld	W	D	L	GF	GA	GD	Pts
Bulgaria	2	1	0	1	5	2	+3	2
Yugoslavia	2	1	0	1	2	5	−3	2

March 2, 1986

Bulgaria	4–0	Yugoslavia

Varna

March 12, 1986

Yugoslavia	2–1	Bulgaria

Lebane

=== Group 13 ===
Team	Pld	W	D	L	GF	GA	GD	Pts
Romania	2	1	0	1	3	2	+1	2
Turkey	2	1	0	1	2	3	−1	2

March 12, 1986

Romania	2–0	Turkey

Varna

March 19, 1986

Turkey	2–1	Romania

Lebane
