= 1988 UEFA European Under-16 Championship qualifying =

Football tournament qualification stage

In the qualifying procedure for the 1988 UEFA European Under-16 Football Championship, 29 teams were divided into 14 groups (13 groups of two teams and one group of three teams) each. The fourteen group winners advanced to the final tournament. The runner-up of the group with three teams and Spain (as host) were also qualified.

== Results ==
=== Group 1 ===
Team	Pld	W	D	L	GF	GA	GD	Pts
Portugal	2	2	0	0	3	1	+2	4
Bulgaria	2	0	0	2	1	3	−2	0

March 9, 1988

Portugal	1–0	Bulgaria

Oeiras

March 23, 1988

Bulgaria	1–2	Portugal

Sandanski

=== Group 2 ===
Team	Pld	W	D	L	GF	GA	GD	Pts
Belgium	2	2	0	0	6	0	+6	4
Luxembourg	2	0	0	2	0	6	−6	0

November 18, 1987

Luxembourg	0–3	Belgium

Beggen

December 9, 1987

Belgium	3–0	Luxembourg

Tienen

=== Group 3 ===
Team	Pld	W	D	L	GF	GA	GD	Pts
East Germany	2	1	0	1	3	1	+2	2
Cyprus	2	1	0	1	1	3	−2	2

November 18, 1987

Cyprus	1–0	East Germany

Aradhippou

December 8, 1987

East Germany	3–0	Cyprus

Hettstedt

=== Group 4 ===
Team	Pld	W	D	L	GF	GA	GD	Pts
France	2	2	0	0	5	0	+5	4
Netherlands	2	0	0	2	0	5	−5	0

March 9, 1988

Netherlands	0–1	France

Den Helder

March 23, 1988

France	4–0	Netherlands

Tours

=== Group 5 ===
Team	Pld	W	D	L	GF	GA	GD	Pts
Austria	2	1	0	1	3	2	+1	2
Greece	2	1	0	1	2	3	−1	2

December 2, 1987

Greece	2–1	Austria

Veria

March 30, 1988

Austria	2–0	Greece

Köflach

=== Group 6 ===
Team	Pld	W	D	L	GF	GA	GD	Pts
Finland	4	2	1	1	7	6	+1	5
Norway	4	1	2	1	6	6	0	4
Denmark	4	1	1	2	7	8	−1	3

September 17, 1987

Finland	3–0	Norway

Lohja

September 29, 1987

Norway	1–1	Denmark

Årnes

October 1, 1987

Norway	1–1	Finland

Strømmen

October 13, 1987

Finland	2–0	Denmark

Pargas

October 24, 1987

Denmark	1–4	Norway

Sønder Omme

November 3, 1987

Denmark	5–1	Finland

Horsens

=== Group 7 ===
Team	Pld	W	D	L	GF	GA	GD	Pts
West Germany	2	1	1	0	2	1	+1	3
Scotland	2	0	1	1	1	2	−1	1

March 2, 1988

West Germany	1–1	Scotland

Oldenburg

March 24, 1988

Scotland	0–1	West Germany

Edinburgh

=== Group 8 ===
Team	Pld	W	D	L	GF	GA	GD	Pts
Hungary	2	1	0	1	2	2	0	2
Czechoslovakia	2	1	0	1	2	2	0	2

October 25, 1987

Hungary	1–0	Czechoslovakia

Salgótarján

March 26, 1988

Czechoslovakia	2–1	Hungary

Písek

=== Group 9 ===
Team	Pld	W	D	L	GF	GA	GD	Pts
Sweden	2	1	1	0	8	3	+5	3
Iceland	2	0	1	1	3	8	−5	1

September 30, 1987

Iceland	3–3	Sweden

Reykjavík

October 17, 1987

Sweden	5–0	Iceland

Mariestad

=== Group 10 ===
Team	Pld	W	D	L	GF	GA	GD	Pts
Republic of Ireland	2	1	1	0	2	0	+2	3
Northern Ireland	2	0	1	1	0	2	−2	1

November 17, 1987

Northern Ireland	0–0	Republic of Ireland

Belfast

March 8, 1988

Republic of Ireland	2–0	Northern Ireland

Cork

=== Group 11 ===
Team	Pld	W	D	L	GF	GA	GD	Pts
Turkey	2	1	1	0	4	3	+1	3
Poland	2	0	1	1	3	4	−1	1

October 15, 1987

Poland	1–1	Turkey

Mirków

March 23, 1988

Turkey	1–1	Poland
Penalties
	5–4

İzmit

=== Group 12 ===
Team	Pld	W	D	L	GF	GA	GD	Pts
Switzerland	2	1	0	1	3	3	0	2
Italy	2	1	0	1	3	3	0	2

November 25, 1987

Switzerland	3–0	Italy

Kreuzlingen

March 16, 1988

Italy	3–0	Switzerland
Penalties
	8–9

Sassari

=== Group 13 ===
Team	Pld	W	D	L	GF	GA	GD	Pts
Romania	2	2	0	0	11	3	+8	4
San Marino	2	0	0	2	3	11	−8	0

November 11, 1987

San Marino	2–6	Romania

Serravalle

November 25, 1987

Romania	5–1	San Marino

Arad

=== Group 14 ===
Team	Pld	W	D	L	GF	GA	GD	Pts
Yugoslavia	2	1	0	1	4	2	+2	2
Soviet Union	2	1	0	1	2	4	−2	2

November 15, 1987

Yugoslavia	3–0	Soviet Union

Pančevo

March 28, 1988

Soviet Union	2–1	Yugoslavia

Uzhhorod
