= 1982 UEFA European Under-16 Championship qualifying =

Football tournament qualification stage

This page describes the qualifying procedure for the 1982 UEFA European Under-16 Football Championship. 26 teams were divided into 8 groups of two, three and four teams each. The eight winners advanced to the quarterfinals, consisting in two-legged rounds. The four winners of the quarterfinals advanced to the final tournament.

== Qualifying stage ==
=== Group I ===
Team	Pld	W	D	L	GF	GA	GD	Pts
Scotland	2	2	0	0	7	2	+5	4
Iceland	2	0	0	2	2	7	–5	0

21 March 1981

Iceland	1–3	Scotland

Kópavogur

6 August 1981

Scotland	4–1	Iceland

Inverness

=== Group II ===
Team	Pld	W	D	L	GF	GA	GD	Pts
Finland	6	3	3	0	11	5	+6	9
Sweden	6	3	3	0	8	2	+6	9
Denmark	6	1	3	2	6	7	–1	5
Norway	6	0	1	5	3	14	–11	1

26 October 1980

Finland	0–0	Sweden

Helsinki

29 October 1980

Denmark	0–0	Sweden

Copenhagen

4 June 1981

Sweden	2–2	Finland

Ekerö

7 June 1981

Norway	2–3	Finland

Lommedalen

27 July 1981

Denmark	1–1	Norway

Nykøbing

29 July 1981

Sweden	3–0	Denmark

Skövde
29 July 1981

Finland	3–0	Norway

Helsinki

1 August 1981

Sweden	2–0	Norway

Trollhättan
1 August 1981

Finland	2–0	Denmark

Tuusula

10 September 1981

Denmark	1–1	Finland

Roskilde
11 September 1981

Norway	0–1	Sweden

Grorud

13 September 1981

Norway	0–4	Denmark

Sørumsand

=== Group III ===
Team	Pld	W	D	L	GF	GA	GD	Pts
West Germany	6	5	1	0	22	1	+21	11
Belgium	6	2	3	1	4	5	–1	7
Netherlands	6	2	2	2	13	10	+3	6
Luxembourg	6	0	0	6	1	24	–23	0

31 January 1981

Luxembourg	0–5	West Germany

Luxembourg

11 March 1981

West Germany	3–0	Belgium

Neuwied

15 April 1981

Belgium	1–0	Luxembourg

Libramont-Chevigny

1 May 1981

Netherlands	8–0	Luxembourg

Waalwijk

12 May 1981

Belgium	1–1	Netherlands

Beringen

15 September 1981

Netherlands	1–1	Belgium

Velp

29 September 1981

West Germany	7–0	Luxembourg

Dillingen

21 October 1981

Luxembourg	0–1	Belgium

Luxembourg

28 October 1981

Netherlands	0–3	West Germany

Zwolle

4 November 1981

Luxembourg	1–2	Netherlands

Differdange

24 November 1981

West Germany	4–1	Netherlands

Lingen

9 December 1981

Belgium	0–0	West Germany

Bornem

=== Group IV ===
Team	Pld	W	D	L	GF	GA	GD	Pts
East Germany	6	3	2	1	6	4	+2	8
Czechoslovakia	6	3	2	1	11	4	+7	8
Austria	6	0	4	2	1	4	–3	4
Poland	6	1	2	3	2	8	–6	4

30 October 1980

Austria	1–1	Czechoslovakia

Vienna

25 March 1981

Czechoslovakia	2–0	Austria

Uherské Hradiště

19 April 1981

Austria	0–1	East Germany

Liezen

1 May 1981

East Germany	1–0	Poland

Freiberg

16 May 1981

Czechoslovakia	1–2	East Germany

Dubňany

27 May 1981

Poland	0–4	Czechoslovakia

Puławy

17 June 1981

Austria	0–0	Poland

Linz

23 September 1981

Poland	0–0	Austria

Warsaw

4 October 1981

East Germany	1–1	Czechoslovakia

Altenberg

21 October 1981

East Germany	0–0	Austria

Torgau
21 October 1981

Czechoslovakia	2–0	Poland

Považská Bystrica

8 November 1981

Poland	2–1	East Germany

Płock

=== Group V ===
Team	Pld	W	D	L	GF	GA	GD	Pts
Soviet Union	4	3	0	1	12	4	+8	6
Hungary	4	3	0	1	6	4	+2	6
Romania	4	0	0	4	2	12	–10	0

27 May 1981

Soviet Union	3–0	Hungary

Minsk

19 September 1981

Hungary	2–1	Soviet Union

Szolnok

17 October 1981

Romania	0–1	Soviet Union

Bucharest

28 October 1981

Soviet Union	7–2	Romania

Yerevan

11 November 1981

Hungary	3–0	Romania

Budapest

25 November 1981

Romania	0–1	Hungary

Bucharest

=== Group VI ===
Team	Pld	W	D	L	GF	GA	GD	Pts
Yugoslavia	4	2	1	1	2	1	+1	5
Greece	4	2	0	2	2	2	0	4
Bulgaria	4	1	1	2	1	2	–1	3

28 October 1980

Yugoslavia	1–0	Bulgaria

Zaječar

19 November 1980

Greece	1–0	Yugoslavia

Drama

24 March 1981

Bulgaria	0–0	Yugoslavia

Dimitrovgrad

8 April 1981

Yugoslavia	1–0	Greece

Sombor

22 April 1981

Bulgaria	1–0	Greece

Sofia

16 September 1981

Greece	1–0	Bulgaria

Serres

=== Group VII ===
Team	Pld	W	D	L	GF	GA	GD	Pts
France	4	2	1	1	5	3	+2	5
Spain	4	2	0	2	8	6	+2	4
Portugal	4	1	1	2	2	6	–4	3

23 December 1980

Spain	5–1	Portugal

Mérida

30 December 1980

Spain	1–2	France

Barcelona

25 February 1981

Portugal	1–0	France

Setúbal

25 March 1981

France	0–0	Portugal

Creil

23 April 1981

France	3–1	Spain

Paris

8 December 1981

Portugal	0–1	Spain

Setúbal

=== Group VIII ===
Team	Pld	W	D	L	GF	GA	GD	Pts
Italy	4	4	0	0	19	3	+16	8
Switzerland	4	2	0	2	17	9	+8	4
Malta	4	0	0	4	1	25	–24	0

7 March 1981

Malta	1–6	Switzerland

Valletta

8 April 1981

Malta	0–5	Italy

Valletta

6 June 1981

Italy	5–1	Switzerland

Como

16 October 1981

Switzerland	8–0	Malta

Stäfa

11 November 1981

Switzerland	2–3	Italy

Locarno

12 December 1981

Italy	6–0	Malta

Roma

== Quarter-finals ==
=== First leg ===
October 14, 1981

Finland	1 – 2	Scotland

Lahti

March 6, 1982

East Germany	1 – 1	West Germany

Pirna

March 10, 1982

France	2 – 2	Italy

Martigues

March 17, 1982

Soviet Union	2 – 0	Yugoslavia

Tashkent

=== Second leg ===
October 28, 1981

Scotland	0 – 2	Finland

Ayr

Finland won 3–2 on aggregate.

March 17, 1982

West Germany	3 – 2	East Germany

Kassel

West Germany won 4–3 on aggregate.

March 17, 1982

Italy	3 – 0	France

Falconara Marittima

Italy won 5–2 on aggregate.

March 31, 1982

Yugoslavia	2 – 0	Soviet Union
Penalties
	4 – 3

Požarevac

Yugoslavia 2–2 Soviet Union on aggregate. Yugoslavia won 4–3 on penalties.
