= 1985 UEFA European Under-16 Championship qualifying =

Football tournament qualification stage

This page describes the qualifying procedure for the 1985 UEFA European Under-16 Football Championship. 25 teams were divided into 12 groups of two and three teams each. The twelve winners advanced to the final tournament.

== Results ==
=== Group 1 ===
Team	Pld	W	D	L	GF	GA	GD	Pts
Scotland	2	1	0	1	5	3	+2	2
Finland	2	1	0	1	3	5	−2	2

October 10, 1984

Finland	3–1	Scotland

Espoo

October 24, 1984

Scotland	4–0	Finland

Kilmarnock

=== Group 2 ===
Team	Pld	W	D	L	GF	GA	GD	Pts
Iceland	2	1	1	0	2	1	+1	3
Denmark	2	0	1	1	1	2	−1	1

September 25, 1984

Iceland	1–0	Denmark

Reykjavík

October 10, 1984

Denmark	1–1	Iceland

Copenhagen

=== Group 3 ===
Norway was the only team in this group.

=== Group 4 ===
Team	Pld	W	D	L	GF	GA	GD	Pts
East Germany	2	2	0	0	4	2	+2	4
Austria	2	0	0	2	2	4	−2	0

March 26, 1985

Austria	1–2	East Germany

Traun

April 3, 1985

East Germany	2–1	Austria

Hettstedt

=== Group 5 ===
Team	Pld	W	D	L	GF	GA	GD	Pts
West Germany	4	3	1	0	16	1	+15	7
Sweden	4	0	3	1	3	7	−4	3
Poland	4	0	2	2	2	13	−11	2

October 10, 1984

Sweden	0–0	West Germany

Eskilstuna

October 28, 1984

Sweden	2–2	Poland

Kristianstad

November 1, 1984

West Germany	5–1	Sweden

Bad Hersfeld

November 18, 1984

Poland	0–0	Sweden

Stargard Szczeciński

November 28, 1984

West Germany	5–0	Poland

Iserlohn

March 24, 1985

Poland	0–6	West Germany

Bełchatów

=== Group 6 ===
Team	Pld	W	D	L	GF	GA	GD	Pts
Soviet Union	2	2	0	0	3	0	+3	4
Czechoslovakia	2	0	0	2	0	3	−3	0

November 4, 1984

Soviet Union	2–0	Czechoslovakia

Tbilisi

March 30, 1985

Czechoslovakia	0–1	Soviet Union

Pelhřimov

=== Group 7 ===
Team	Pld	W	D	L	GF	GA	GD	Pts
Spain	2	2	0	0	9	0	+9	4
Luxembourg	2	0	0	2	0	9	−9	0

March 20, 1985

Luxembourg	0–2	Spain

Beggen

April 3, 1985

Spain	7–0	Luxembourg

Fraga

=== Group 8 ===
Team	Pld	W	D	L	GF	GA	GD	Pts
Italy	4	3	0	1	11	1	+10	6
Portugal	4	2	1	1	2	4	−2	5
Switzerland	4	0	1	3	0	8	−8	1

December 5, 1984

Italy	3–0	Switzerland

Pistoia

January 9, 1985

Portugal	1–0	Switzerland

Évora

January 23, 1985

Portugal	0–4	Italy

Olhão

March 13, 1985

Italy	0–1	Portugal

Monza

March 16, 1985

Switzerland	0–0	Portugal

Monthey

March 27, 1985

Switzerland	0–4	Italy

Hochdorf

=== Group 9 ===
Team	Pld	W	D	L	GF	GA	GD	Pts
France	4	2	2	0	5	2	+3	6
Netherlands	4	1	1	2	5	6	−1	3
Belgium	4	1	1	2	3	5	−2	3

October 31, 1984

France	2–0	Belgium

Saint-Quentin

November 14, 1984

Belgium	3–1	Netherlands

Bornem

November 28, 1984

Netherlands	1–1	France

Katwijk

March 6, 1985

Belgium	0–0	France

Kortrijk

March 13, 1985

Netherlands	2–0	Belgium

Middelburg

March 20, 1985

France	2–1	Netherlands

Boulogne-sur-Mer

=== Group 10 ===
Team	Pld	W	D	L	GF	GA	GD	Pts
Greece	2	1	1	0	3	2	+1	3
Cyprus	2	0	1	1	2	3	−1	1

March 6, 1985

Cyprus	1–2	Greece

Limassol

March 27, 1985

Greece	1–1	Cyprus

Rhodes

=== Group 11 ===
Bulgaria was the only team in this group.

=== Group 12 ===
Team	Pld	W	D	L	GF	GA	GD	Pts
Yugoslavia	2	1	0	1	2	2	0	2
Romania	2	1	0	1	2	2	0	2

November 22, 1984

Romania	2–1	Yugoslavia

Braşov

March 20, 1985

Yugoslavia	1–0	Romania

Kladovo
