= Montaigu Tournament =

- Mondial Minimes
- Founded: 1973
- Region: France
- Teams: Nation: 8 Club: 8
- Current champions: Nation Men: Brazil (3rd title); Club Men: (France) FC Nantes (10th title); Nation Women: Japan (3rd title)
- Most championships: Nation Men: France (10 titles); Club Men: (France) FC Nantes (10 titles); Nation Women: 5 nations with 1 title each
- Website: Official website
- 2025 Montaigu Tournament

The Montaigu Tournament (French: Tournoi de Montaigu) is an international association football competition that is contested by under-16 national teams and clubs. The tournament is also known as Mondial Minimes.

The games are held in stadiums located in the Vendée department of France. The final is played at the Stade Maxime Bossis in Montaigu.

== History ==
The tournament was founded in 1973 by André Van Den Brink, who at the time was the president of FC Montaigu, a French amateur football team.

== Famous players ==
Future famous international players have played in the Montaigu Tournament, such as:

- (Portugal) Cristiano Ronaldo
- (Italy) Andrea Pirlo
- (Czech Republic) Pavel Nedvěd
- (Romania) Gheorghe Hagi
- (Argentina) Carlos Tevez
- (France) Marcel Desailly
- (France) Didier Deschamps
- (France) Thierry Henry
- (France) Karim Benzema
- (France) Carl Medjani
- (France) Yoann Gourcuff
- (France) Kylian Mbappé
- (France) Hatem Ben Arfa
- (England) Morgan Rogers

== Results ==
=== Men's national teams ===
==== By year ====
Year	Winner	Runner-up	Third place	Fourth place
1976	France	(Germany) Eintracht Frankfurt	(Netherlands) Ajax Amsterdam	
1977	France	Israel	West Germany	
1978	England	Israel	West Germany	
1979	Israel	West Germany	Scotland	
1980	Scotland	France	Netherlands	
1981	West Germany	Republic of Ireland	Belgium	
1982	Republic of Ireland	Italy	Israel	
1983	France	Scotland	Italy	
1984	Brazil	France	Belgium	
1985	Soviet Union	Switzerland	Poland	
1986	Cameroon	England	Belgium	
1987	Belgium	Hungary	Soviet Union	
1988	Mexico	Czechoslovakia	Atlantic Selection	
1989	Soviet Union	Belgium	Spain	
1990	Soviet Union	Germany	Belgium	
1991	Soviet Union	France	Spain	
1992	United States	Czechoslovakia	France	
1993	Cameroon	Portugal	Spain	
1994	Cameroon	Portugal	Italy	
1995	Cameroon	France	Italy	
1996	France	Belgium	Scotland	
1997	France	Netherlands	Cameroon	
1998	France	Cameroon	England	
1999	Italy	Spain	Gabon	
2000	England	Italy	Argentina	
2001	France	England	Peru	
2002	Argentina	France	Peru	
2003	Italy	France	Portugal	
2004	Japan	Italy	Ivory Coast	
2005	France	Japan	Germany	
2006	France	Italy	Tunisia	
2007	Germany	England	France	
2008	England	France	Germany	
2009	England	Germany	France	
2010	Portugal	England	France	
2011	England	France	Portugal	
2012	Portugal	Russia	England	
2013	Turkey	England	France	
2014	Ivory Coast	South Korea	England	France
2015	England	France	Morocco	Ivory Coast
2016	United States	France	Brazil	Morocco
2017	Portugal	France	Denmark	Japan
2018	Portugal	Brazil	England	France
2019	Argentina	Mexico	England	Brazil
2020	Cancelled due to COVID-19 pandemic			
2021	Spain	France		
2022	Brazil	Argentina	England	Portugal
2023	England	Japan	France	Romania
2024	France	Mexico	Ivory Coast	Japan
2025	France	Portugal	Mexico	China
2026	Brazil	Portugal	Ivory Coast	Mexico

==== By teams ====
As of 2026

Teams	Champions	Runner-up	3rd place
France	11	12	6
England	7	5	6
Portugal	4	4	2
Cameroon	4	1	1
Soviet Union	4	0	1
Brazil	3	1	1
Italy	2	4	3
West Germany	2	3	4
Argentina	2	1	1
United States	2	0	0
Belgium	1	2	4
Israel	1	2	1
Japan	1	2	0
Spain	1	1	3
Scotland	1	1	2
Republic of Ireland	1	1	0
Mexico	1	3	1
Ivory Coast	1	0	3
Morocco	1	0	0
Turkey	1	0	0
Czechoslovakia	0	2	0
Netherlands	0	1	1
Hungary	0	1	0
Switzerland	0	1	0
Russia	0	1	0
(Germany) Eintracht Frankfurt	0	1	0
South Korea	0	1	0
Peru	0	0	2
Poland	0	0	1
Denmark	0	0	1
Tunisia	0	0	1
Gabon	0	0	1
Atlantic Selection	0	0	1
(Netherlands) Ajax Amsterdam	0	1	0

=== Women's national teams ===
==== By year ====
Year	Winner	Runner-up	Third place	Fourth place
2019	France	North Korea	China	Spain
2020	Cancelled due to COVID-19 pandemic			
2021	Spain	Norway		
2022	Netherlands	Norway	France	
2023	United States	France	Japan	Portugal
2024	Japan	Netherlands	Sweden	France
2025	Japan	China	France	Mexico
2026	Japan	China	Mexico	Portugal

==== By teams ====
As of 2026

Teams	Champions	Runner-up	3rd place
Japan	3	0	1
France	1	1	2
Netherlands	1	1	0
Spain	1	0	0
United States	1	0	0
China	0	2	1
Norway	0	2	0
North Korea	0	1	0
Sweden	0	0	1
Mexico	0	0	1

=== Men's clubs ===
==== By year ====
Year	Winner	Runner-up	Third place	Fourth place
1973	(Belgium) RSC Anderlecht	(Germany) Bayern Munich	(Germany) Eintracht Francfort	
1974	(Belgium) RSC Anderlecht	(Germany) Eintracht Francfort	(Switzerland) FC Basel	
1975	(Belgium) RSC Anderlecht	(Germany) Bayern Munich	(France) Paris Saint-Germain	
1977	(Belgium) RSC Anderlecht	(France) Paris Saint-Germain	(Germany) Bayern Munich	
1978	(France) FC Nantes	(Netherlands) Ajax Amsterdam	(Belgium) RSC Anderlecht	
1979	(France) Paris FC	(Germany) Borussia M'gladbach	(Germany) VfB Stuttgart	
1980	(France) Paris FC	(Belgium) RSC Anderlecht	(France) FC Nantes	
1982	(France) FC Nantes	(Belgium) RSC Anderlecht	(Germany) Eintracht Francfort	
1983	(Italy) Torino	(France) Paris Saint-Germain	(Belgium) RSC Anderlecht	
1984	(France) Girondins de Bordeaux	(France) FC Nantes	(Spain) Real Sociedad	
1985	(France) AJ Auxerre	(France) Girondins de Bordeaux	(France) FC Nantes	
1986	(France) Girondins de Bordeaux	(France) Paris Saint-Germain	(France) Olympique de Marseille	
1987	(France) Girondins de Bordeaux	(France) RC Paris	(France) AJ Auxerre	
1988	(France) FC Nantes	(France) Vendée Sélection	(France) Paris Saint-Germain	
1989	(France) Girondins de Bordeaux	(France) Paris Saint-Germain	(France) Toulouse FC	
1990	(France) FC Nantes	(France) AS Cannes	(France) Toulouse FC	
1991	(France) Toulouse FC	(France) AS Cannes	(France) FC Nantes	
1992	(France) FC Nantes	(Spain) Real Sociedad	(France) Vendée Sélection	
1993	(France) Paris Saint-Germain	(France) AJ Auxerre	(France) Girondins de Bordeaux	
1994	(France) FC Nantes	(France) Paris Saint-Germain	(France) AJ Auxerre	
1995	(France) AJ Auxerre	(France) Olympique Lyonnais	(France) AS Saint-Étienne	
1996	(France) FC Nantes	(France) AJ Auxerre	(France) Stade Rennais FC	
1997	(France) AS Saint-Étienne	(France) Stade Rennais FC	(France) AJ Auxerre	
1998	(France) AS Saint-Étienne	(France) Vendée Sélection	(France) Olympique lyonnais	
1999	(France) Stade Rennais FC	(France) AS Saint-Étienne	(France) FC Nantes	
2000	(France) Olympique lyonnais	(France) AS Nancy	(France) Stade Rennais FC	
2001	(France) Girondins de Bordeaux	(France) Stade Rennais FC	(France) AS Saint-Étienne	
2002	(France) Lille OSC	(France) FC Nantes	(France) Stade Rennais FC	
2003	(France) Stade Rennais FC	(France) RC Lens	(France) Girondins de Bordeaux	
2004	(France) Olympique Lyonnais	(France) FC Nantes	(France) Girondins de Bordeaux	
2005	(France) Girondins de Bordeaux	(France) Olympique de Marseille	(France) Stade Rennais FC	
2006	(France) Olympique de Marseille	(France) Stade Rennais FC	(France) Olympique Lyonnais	
2007	(France) AJ Auxerre	(France) Olympique Lyonnais	(France) Olympique de Marseille	
2008	(France) AJ Auxerre	(France) AS Saint-Étienne	(France) FC Nantes	
2009	(France) AS Saint-Étienne	(France) Stade Rennais FC	(France) Olympique lyonnais	
2010	(France) Stade Rennais FC	(France) AS Saint-Étienne	(France) FC Nantes	
2011	(France) FC Nantes	(France) Girondins de Bordeaux	(France) AJ Auxerre	
2012	(France) Girondins de Bordeaux	(France) AS Saint-Étienne	(France) AJ Auxerre	
2013	(Russia) Chertanovo	(France) Le Mans FC	(France) FC Lorient	(France) AS Saint-Étienne
2014	(France) Stade Rennais FC	(France) FC Nantes	(France) Vendée Sélection	(France) Olympique lyonnais
2015	(France) FC Nantes	(France) Olympique de Marseille	(France) RC Lens	(France) Olympique lyonnais
2016	(France) Stade Rennais FC	(France) Stade de Reims	(France) Olympique Lyonnais	(France) Olympique de Marseille
2017	(France) Stade Rennais FC	(France) Olympique de Marseille	(France) FC Metz	(France) FC Nantes
2018	(France) Stade Rennais FC	(France) Olympique de Marseille	(France) FC Nantes	(France) Girondins de Bordeaux
2019	(France) OGC Nice	(France) RC Strasbourg	(France) FC Nantes	(France) Olympique de Marseille
2020	Cancelled due to COVID-19 pandemic			
2021	(France) Toulouse FC	(France) RC Strasbourg	(France) Vendée Sélection	(France) OGC Nice
2022	(France) AS Saint Etienne	(France) Olympique de Marseille	(France) Vendée Sélection	(France) Girondins de Bordeaux
2023	(Belgium) RSC Anderlecht	(France) Olympique Lyonnais	(France) Stade Rennais FC	(France) Girondins de Bordeaux
2024	(France) FC Nantes	(France) Girondins de Bordeaux	(France) Olympique Lyonnais	(France) Vendée Sélection

==== By club ====
As of 2023

Club	Victories	Runner-up	Third place
(France) FC Nantes	9	4	8
(France) Stade Rennais FC	7	4	5
(France) Girondins de Bordeaux	7	2	3
(Belgium) RSC Anderlecht	5	2	2
(France) AS Saint-Étienne	4	4	2
(France) AJ Auxerre	4	2	5
(France) Olympique lyonnais	2	3	3
(France) Toulouse FC	2		2
(France) Paris FC	2		
(France) Paris Saint-Germain	1	5	2
(France) Olympique de Marseille	1	5	2
(Russia) Chertanovo	1		
(France) Lille OSC	1		
(France) OGC Nice	1		
(Italy) Torino	1		

== See also ==
- Maurice Revello Tournament
- Sud Ladies Cup
- Torneo di Viareggio
- Granatkin Memorial
- Valeriy Lobanovskyi Memorial Tournament
- Under-20 Four Nations Tournament
- Under 20 Elite League
- Vlatko Marković International Tournament
