= Romania national under-16 football team =

National U-14 association football team

Romania U-16
- Nickname: Tricolorii (The Tricolours)
- Association: Federația Română de Fotbal
- Confederation: UEFA (Europe)
- Head coach: Alexandru Ciobanu
- Captain: Majon Robert
- Most caps: Mihai Iosif (20)
- Top scorer: Majon Robert (19)
- Home stadium: CNAF
- FIFA code: ROU
First colours	Second colours	Third colours

The Romania national under-16 football team represents Romania in international football at this age level and is controlled by Federația Română de Fotbal, the governing body for football in Romania. Majon Robert holds the record for the most goals in this age category.

== Competitive record ==
=== UEFA European Under-16 and Under-17 Football Championship ===
==== Under-16 era ====
European Championship record								European Championship Qualification record						
Year	Round	Pld	W	D *	L	GF	GA	Position	Pld	W	D *	L	GF	GA
(Italy) 1982	did not qualify	–	–	–	–	–	–	3	4	0	0	4	2	12
(West Germany) 1984	did not qualify	–	–	–	–	–	–	3	6	2	1	3	5	8
(Hungary) 1985	did not qualify	–	–	–	–	–	–	2	2	1	0	1	2	2
(Greece) 1986	Group phase	3	1	0	2	3	5	1	2	1	0	1	3	2
(France) 1987	did not qualify	–	–	–	–	–	–	2	2	1	0	1	1	3
(Spain) 1988	Group phase	3	0	3	0	3	3	1	2	2	0	0	11	3
(Denmark) 1989	Group phase	3	1	1	1	1	4	1	2	1	0	1	5	2
(East Germany) 1990	did not qualify	–	–	–	–	–	–	2	4	1	2	1	6	5
(Switzerland) 1991	Group phase	3	1	1	1	3	5	1	2	1	0	1	3	2
(Cyprus) 1992	Group phase	3	0	1	2	1	7	1	2	1	0	1	2	2
(Turkey) 1993	did not qualify	–	–	–	–	–	–	2	2	0	0	2	0	3
(Republic of Ireland) 1994	did not qualify	–	–	–	–	–	–	3	4	0	1	3	2	8
(Belgium) 1995	did not qualify	–	–	–	–	–	–	3	2	0	2	2	2	4
(Austria) 1996	Group phase	3	0	0	3	1	6	1	2	2	0	0	4	1
(Germany) 1997	did not qualify	–	–	–	–	–	–	3	3	1	1	1	3	4
(Scotland) 1998	did not qualify	–	–	–	–	–	–	2	4	2	1	1	5	2
(Czech Republic) 1999	did not qualify	–	–	–	–	–	–	3	2	0	1	1	3	5
(Israel) 2000	Group phase	3	0	0	3	0	5	1	2	2	0	0	5	0
(England) 2001	Group phase	3	0	0	3	2	13	1	2	2	0	0	9	0

*Draws also include penalty shootouts, regardless of the outcome.

==== Under-17 era ====
European Championship record								European Championship Qualification record						
Year	Round	Pld	W	D *	L	GF	GA	Position	Pld	W	D *	L	GF	GA
(Denmark) 2002	did not qualify	–	–	–	–	–	–	3	3	1	0	2	3	3
(Portugal) 2003	did not qualify	–	–	–	–	–	–	^{Q1} 2	3	2	0	1	13	2
(Portugal) 2003	did not qualify	–	–	–	–	–	–	^{Q2} 3	3	1	1	1	4	5
(France) 2004	did not qualify	–	–	–	–	–	–	^{Q1} 2	3	2	0	1	6	1
(France) 2004	did not qualify	–	–	–	–	–	–	^{Q2} 4	3	0	1	2	3	6
(Italy) 2005	did not qualify	–	–	–	–	–	–	^{First} 2	3	2	0	1	5	4
(Italy) 2005	did not qualify	–	–	–	–	–	–	^{Elite} 3	3	1	1	1	2	2
(Luxembourg) 2006	did not qualify	–	–	–	–	–	–	^{First} 2	3	1	1	1	4	1
(Luxembourg) 2006	did not qualify	–	–	–	–	–	–	^{Elite} 4	3	1	0	2	3	6
(Belgium) 2007	did not qualify	–	–	–	–	–	–	^{First}3	3	1	1	1	4	4
(Turkey) 2008	did not qualify	–	–	–	–	–	–	^{First} 2	3	1	2	0	2	1
(Turkey) 2008	did not qualify	–	–	–	–	–	–	^{Elite} 2	3	1	2	0	4	3
(Germany) 2009	did not qualify	–	–	–	–	–	–	^{First} 2	3	2	0	1	7	4
(Germany) 2009	did not qualify	–	–	–	–	–	–	^{Elite} 3	3	1	1	1	2	4
(Liechtenstein) 2010	did not qualify	–	–	–	–	–	–	^{First} 2	3	2	0	1	6	4
(Liechtenstein) 2010	did not qualify	–	–	–	–	–	–	^{Elite} 4	3	0	1	2	4	10
(Serbia) 2011	Group phase	3	0	1	2	1	3	^{First} 1	3	3	0	0	12	0
(Serbia) 2011	Group phase	3	0	1	2	1	3	^{Elite} 1	3	2	1	0	4	2
(Slovenia) 2012	did not qualify	–	–	–	–	–	–	^{First}3	3	0	1	2	2	4
(Slovakia) 2013	did not qualify	–	–	–	–	–	–	^{First}3	3	0	1	2	2	5
(Malta) 2014	did not qualify	–	–	–	–	–	–	^{First} 1	3	3	0	0	4	0
(Malta) 2014	did not qualify	–	–	–	–	–	–	^{Elite} 3	3	0	1	2	0	2
(Bulgaria) 2015	did not qualify	–	–	–	–	–	–	^{First} 2	3	2	0	1	8	3
(Bulgaria) 2015	did not qualify	–	–	–	–	–	–	^{Elite} 4	3	0	0	3	1	7

*Draws also include penalty shootouts, regardless of the outcome.

== Results and fixtures ==
=== 2026 ===
11 February 2026 U16 UEFA Development Tournament, Cyprus 2026	Wales	0–2	Romania	Paphos, Cyprus
11:00		Report	Pădure 33'; Pall 90+2'	Stadium: Kouklia Community Stadium

13 February 2026 U16 UEFA Development Tournament, Cyprus 2026	Scotland	2–1	Romania	Paphos, Cyprus
11:00	Fraser 21'; Watt 90+2'	Report	Roșiu 56'	Stadium: Kouklia Community Stadium

16 February 2026 U16 UEFA Development Tournament, Cyprus 2026	Cyprus	1–1 (4–2 p)	Romania	Paphos, Cyprus
11:00	Skender 50'	Report	Pădure 78'	Stadium: Geroskipou Municipality Stadium

3 June 2026 U16 Black Sea Tournament 2026	Romania	0–0	Turkey	Buftea, Romania
18:00		Report		Stadium: CNF Buftea; Referee: Claudiu Filip (Romania)

9 June 2026 U16 Black Sea Tournament 2026	Romania	3–1	Georgia	Buftea, Romania
18:00	Petreanu 48'; Budescu 69'; Pădure 87'	Report	Kvaratskhelia 37'	Stadium: CNF Buftea

== Current squad ==
Note: Flags indicate national team as defined under FIFA eligibility rules; some limited exceptions apply. Players may hold more than one non-FIFA nationality.

No.	Pos.	Nation	Player
12	GK	ROU	Vlad Răfăilă (from Viitorul Constanța U17)
14	GK	ROU	Patrick Kis (from FC Universitatea Cluj U17)
2	DF	ROU	Alexandru Fărăgău (from FC Universitatea Cluj U17)
5	DF	ROU	Luca Popa (from CAO Oradea)
6	DF	ROU	Florin Brășfăleanu (from CS Universitatea Craiova U17)
4	DF	ROU	Justin Sgîrcitu (from FCSB U17)
14	DF	ROU	Adrian Horșia (from FCSB U17)
3	DF	ROU	Sebastian Borza (from Viitorul Constanța U17)
7	DF	ROU	Majon Robert (from Viitoul Tg jiu U17)
24	DF	ROU	Mario Tudose (from FC Argeș Pitești)
21	MF	ROU	Fabiano Cibi (from LPS Banatul U17)
19	MF	ROU	Cosmin Costea (from Prosport Football Academy U17)

No.	Pos.	Nation	Player
20	MF	ROU	Eric Vînău (from FC Universitatea Cluj U17)
16	MF	ROU	Leonard Moraru (from FC Universitatea Cluj U17)
17	MF	ROU	Andrei Mihăilă (from Sport Team Bucharest U17)
10	MF	ROU	Luca Manolache (from FCSB U17)
15	MF	ROU	Adrian Caragea (from Viitorul Constanța U17)
22	MF	ROU	Adrian Mazilu (from Viitorul Constanța U17)
13	MF	ROU	Rareș Pop (from UTA Arad U17)
8	FW	ROU	Victor Stancovici (from FCSB U17)
11	FW	ROU	Alexandru Melniciuc (from Prosport Football Academy U17)
9	FW	ROU	David Nemțanu (from Prosport Football Academy U17)
18	FW	ROU	Norbert Nagy (from UTA Arad U17)

== See also ==
- Romania national football team
- Romania national under-21 football team
- Romania national under-20 football team
- Romania national under-17 football team
- European Under-16 Football Championship
