= Central Stadium of the Romanian National Football Centre =

Football stadium in Romania

Coordinates: 44°32′53″N 25°58′52″E

National Football Center Stadium
- Interactive map of National Football Center Stadium
- Location: Buftea, Romania
- Owner: FRF
- Capacity: 1,600
- Surface: Poaceae

Construction
- Opened: 6 September 2011

Tenants
- Romania U-19; Romania U-17; Romania U-16; ACS Buftea (2012–2013); Sportul Studențesc II București (2012–2013); Metaloglobus București (2014–2015); ACS Berceni (2016)

The Central Stadium of the Romanian National Football Centre is a football stadium in Romania. The ground is part of the Football Centre in Buftea and has a double stand with views to each of its two fields. It can hold 800 people on each side. The complex is the second training centre of the Romanian Football Federation.

The Buftea Stadium staged three group matches at the 2011 UEFA European Under-19 Championship.
