= 1986 UEFA European Under-16 Championship =

Ευρωπαϊκό πρωτάθλημα ποδοσφαίρου Παίδων 1986

Tournament details
- Host country: Greece
- Dates: 1–10 May
- Teams: 16 (from 1 confederation)
- Venue: (in 7 host cities)

Final positions
- Champions: Spain (1st title)
- Runners-up: Italy
- Third place: Soviet Union
- Fourth place: East Germany

Tournament statistics
- Matches played: 28
- Goals scored: 69 (2.46 per match)

The 1986 UEFA European Under-16 Championship was the 4th edition of the UEFA's European Under-16 Football Championship. Greece hosted the 16 teams that contested 1–10 May 1986.

Spain won its first title.

== Participants ==
- Austria
- Bulgaria
- Czechoslovakia
- Denmark
- East Germany
- France
- Greece (Hosts)
- Italy
- Netherlands
- Norway
- Portugal
- Romania
- Scotland
- Soviet Union
- Spain
- Sweden

== Results ==
=== First stage ===
==== Group A ====
Team	Pld	W	D	L	GF	GA	GD	Pts
Italy	3	2	1	0	4	0	+4	5
Scotland	3	2	0	1	6	2	+4	4
Portugal	3	1	1	1	4	5	−1	3
Greece	3	0	0	3	0	7	−7	0

1 May 1986

Scotland	5–1	Portugal

Chania

1 May 1986

Italy	3–0	Greece

Chania

3 May 1986

Italy	1–0	Scotland

Heraklion

3 May 1986

Portugal	3–0	Greece

Heraklion

5 May 1986

Scotland	1–0	Greece

Heraklion

5 May 1986

Portugal	0–0	Italy

Heraklion

==== Group B ====
Team	Pld	W	D	L	GF	GA	GD	Pts
Spain	3	2	1	0	6	1	+5	5
Bulgaria	3	1	2	0	3	2	+1	4
Norway	3	0	2	1	1	3	−2	2
Sweden	3	0	1	2	0	4	−4	1

1 May 1986

Bulgaria	1–0	Sweden

Athens

1 May 1986

Spain	2–0	Norway

Piraeus

3 May 1986

Spain	1–1	Bulgaria

Athens

3 May 1986

Norway	0–0	Sweden

Piraeus

5 May 1986

Spain	3–0	Sweden

Piraeus

5 May 1986

Bulgaria	1–1	Norway

Athens

==== Group C ====
Team	Pld	W	D	L	GF	GA	GD	Pts
East Germany	3	2	1	0	5	2	+3	5
Czechoslovakia	3	1	1	1	5	3	+2	3
Denmark	3	1	1	1	4	3	+1	3
Austria	3	0	1	2	1	7	−6	1

1 May 1986

Denmark	1–1	Czechoslovakia

Thessaloniki

1 May 1986

East Germany	1–1	Austria

Thessaloniki

3 May 1986

East Germany	2–1	Denmark

Thessaloniki

3 May 1986

Czechoslovakia	4–0	Austria

Thessaloniki

5 May 1986

Denmark	2–0	Austria

Thessaloniki

5 May 1986

East Germany	2–0	Czechoslovakia

Thessaloniki

==== Group D ====
Team	Pld	W	D	L	GF	GA	GD	Pts
Soviet Union	3	3	0	0	10	3	+7	6
Romania	3	1	0	2	3	5	−2	2
Netherlands	3	1	0	2	2	4	−2	2
France	3	1	0	2	3	6	−3	2

1 May 1986

Soviet Union	3–1	Netherlands
Salenko 25', 78'; Sergey Shchetnikov 31'		70' van der Star

Trikala

1 May 1986

France	2–1	Romania

Larissa

3 May 1986

Netherlands	1–0	France

Trikala

3 May 1986

Soviet Union	3–1	Romania

Larissa

5 May 1986

Soviet Union	4–1	France

Trikala

5 May 1986

Romania	1–0	Netherlands

Larissa

=== Semi-finals ===
8 May 1986

Spain	2–1	Soviet Union

Piraeus
8 May 1986

Italy	2–2	East Germany
Penalties
	4–2

Athens

=== Third place match ===
10 May 1986

Soviet Union	1–1	East Germany
Penalties
	8–7

Athens

=== Final ===
10 May 1986

Spain	2–1	Italy
Ballester 11'; Monsalvete 78'		Cappellini 61'

Olympic Stadium, Athens
Referee: (Sweden) Bo Karlsson
