= UEFA Under-16 Development Tournament =

- Organiser(s): UEFA
- Founded: 2012
- Region: Europe
- Teams: 4
- Website: Official UEFA Youth Development Tournaments website

UEFA Under-16 Development Tournament is the association football tournament organised by the Union of European Football Associations (UEFA) to enable young men and women footballers to experience international football.

== History ==
The tournament was established in 2012, and since then, 217 such tournaments have been organised, with four national teams competing at each tournament. The tournament especially focuses on developing young players, with a special set of rules applied for that purpose. For example, a player has a minimum playing time in case of a draw and a penalty shootout. The number of substitutions permitted is also increased above the standard limit, a further regulation designed to prioritise development over competition. The tournament helps young referees to gain experience in international football as well. Several players who have gone on to prominent careers in senior international football participated in the development tournaments at under-16 level, among them Erling Haaland, Phil Foden, Gavi and Matthijs de Ligt. The tournament also enables the participation of non-UEFA members, with 23 non-UEFA boys' teams and four non-UEFA girls' teams having competed in the tournament as of November 2022 .

A similar tournament was organised for the under-15 national football teams in 2019, and 21 such tournaments were played. The same under-15 tournament was organised for girls in 2022, with eight tournaments since then.

In 2020, Poland was scheduled to host the UEFA Development Tournament at the Subcarpathian Football Center, Stalowa Wola and Tarnobrzeg Stadium, Tarnobrzeg. The tournament was to feature the Poland U-16, Venezuela U-16, Iceland U-16 and Iran U-16. However, the event, planned for March and April, was canceled on 18 March 2020 due to the COVID-19 pandemic and the associated epidemiological threat in Poland.

== See also ==
- Telki Cup
