= 1987 UEFA European Under-16 Championship =

Championnat d'Europe de football des moins de 16 ans 1987

Tournament details
- Host country: France
- Dates: 25 May – 3 June
- Teams: 16 (from 1 confederation)

Final positions
- Champions: Italy
- Runners-up: Soviet Union
- Third place: France
- Fourth place: Turkey

Tournament statistics
- Matches played: 28
- Goals scored: 56 (2 per match)

The 1987 UEFA European Under-16 Championship was the 5th edition of the UEFA's European Under-16 Football Championship. France hosted the 16 teams entered the competition during 25 May and 3 June 1987.

Spain unsuccessfully defended its title.

Italy won the final match against the Soviet Union but UEFA withdrew Italy's title, because they had played Riccardo Secci, inscribed with an irregular document. No European title was awarded. The top three countries qualified for the 1987 FIFA U-16 World Championship in Canada.

== Participants ==
- Austria
- Czechoslovakia
- Denmark
- East Germany
- France
- Greece
- Northern Ireland
- Norway
- Israel
- Italy
- Portugal
- Scotland
- Soviet Union
- Turkey
- West Germany
- Yugoslavia

== Results ==
=== First stage ===
==== Group A ====
Team	Pld	W	D	L	GF	GA	GD	Pts
Turkey	3	2	1	0	2	0	+2	7
Greece	3	0	3	0	1	1	0	3
Denmark	3	0	2	1	2	3	−1	2
Israel	3	0	2	1	1	2	−1	2

25 May 1987

Turkey	0–0	Greece
	Report

Stade de la Source, Orléans
Referee: ? (France)

25 May 1987

Denmark	1–1	Israel

Évreux

27 May 1987

Turkey	1–0	Israel
Uygun 25'	Report

Mantes-la-Ville
Referee: ? (France)

27 May 1987

Denmark	1–1	Greece

Saint-Ouen, Seine-Saint-Denis

29 May 1987

Greece	0–0	Israel

Compiègne

29 May 1987

Turkey	1–0	Denmark
Durmuş 50'	Report

Lucé
Referee: ? (France)

==== Group B ====
Team	Pld	W	D	L	GF	GA	GD	Pts
France	3	2	1	0	6	2	+4	7
Portugal	3	2	0	1	5	3	+2	6
Scotland	3	0	2	1	4	6	−2	2
East Germany	3	0	1	2	2	6	−4	1

25 May 1987

Scotland	2–2	East Germany

Saint-Nazaire

25 May 1987

France	2–1	Portugal

Saint-Brieuc

27 May 1987

France	1–1	Scotland

Vannes

27 May 1987

Portugal	1–0	East Germany

Quimper

29 May 1987

Portugal	3–1	Scotland

Redon

29 May 1987

France	3–0	East Germany

Lorient

==== Group C ====
Team	Pld	W	D	L	GF	GA	GD	Pts
Italy	3	1	2	0	5	4	+1	5
West Germany	3	1	2	0	5	4	+1	5
Czechoslovakia	3	0	2	1	2	3	−1	2
Northern Ireland	3	0	2	1	2	3	−1	2

25 May 1987

Italy	2–1	Czechoslovakia

Vagney

25 May 1987

West Germany	2–1	Northern Ireland

Chaumont

27 May 1987

Northern Ireland	1–1	Italy

Vittel

27 May 1987

West Germany	1–1	Czechoslovakia

Montbéliard

29 May 1987

West Germany	2–2	Italy

Épinal

29 May 1987

Northern Ireland	0–0	Czechoslovakia

Mulhouse

==== Group D ====
Team	Pld	W	D	L	GF	GA	GD	Pts
Soviet Union	3	3	0	0	9	1	+8	9
Norway	3	1	1	1	3	4	−1	4
Austria	3	0	2	1	1	2	−1	2
Yugoslavia	3	0	1	2	1	7	−6	1

25 May 1987

Soviet Union	4–0	Yugoslavia

Le Mans

25 May 1987

Norway	0–0	Austria

Poitiers

27 May 1987

Norway	2–0	Yugoslavia

Thouars

27 May 1987

Soviet Union	1–0	Austria

Blois

29 May 1987

Yugoslavia	1–1	Austria

Angers

29 May 1987

Soviet Union	4–1	Norway

Tours

=== Semi-finals ===
1 June 1987

Italy	1–0	Turkey

Reims
Referee: ? (Austria)
1 June 1987

Soviet Union	0–0	France
Penalties
	3–0

Rouen

=== Third place match ===
3 June 1987

France	3–0	Turkey

Montataire
Referee: ? (Czechoslovakia)

=== Final ===
3 June 1987

Italy	1 – 0	Soviet Union
Gallo 65'

Parc des Princes, Paris
Referee: (East Germany) Wieland Ziller

== Qualified teams for FIFA U-17 World Championship ==
The following three teams from UEFA qualified for the 1987 FIFA U-16 World Championship.

- France
- Italy
- Soviet Union
