= Poland national under-16 football team =

National association football team

Poland Under-16
- Nickname(s): Biało-czerwoni (The White and Reds); Białe Orły (The White Eagles)
- Association: Polish Football Association (Polski Związek Piłki Nożnej)
- Confederation: UEFA (Europe)
- Head coach: Piotr Klepczarek
- FIFA code: POL
First colours	Second colours

UEFA European Under-16 Championship
- Appearances: 9 (first in 1990)
- Best result: Winners (1993)

The Poland national under-16 football team represents Poland in international football at this age level and is controlled by Polish Football Association. The team previously competed in the annual UEFA European Under-16 Football Championship before it was re-arranged into an under-17 competition in 2002.

== Competitive record ==
*Denotes draws include knockout matches decided on penalty kicks.
Gold background colour indicates that the tournament was won.
Silver background colour indicates second place finish.
Bronze background colour indicates third place finish.
Red border color indicates tournament was held on home soil.

=== UEFA European U-16 Championship ===
Year	Round	Pld	W	D *	L	GF	GA
(Italy) 1982	did not qualify						
(West Germany) 1984	did not qualify						
(Hungary) 1985	did not qualify						
(Greece) 1986	did not qualify						
(France) 1987	did not qualify						
(Spain) 1988	did not qualify						
(Denmark) 1989	did not qualify						
(East Germany) 1990	Third place	5	3	1	1	10	7
(Switzerland) 1991	Group stage	3	0	1	2	1	3
(Cyprus) 1992	did not qualify						
(Turkey) 1993	Champions	6	4	2	0	7	2
(Republic of Ireland) 1994	did not qualify						
(Belgium) 1995	Group stage	3	0	1	2	1	3
(Austria) 1996	Group stage	3	0	1	2	0	4
(Germany) 1997	Group stage	3	1	0	2	4	8
(Scotland) 1998	did not qualify						
(Czech Republic) 1999	Runners-up	6	3	1	2	9	13
(Iceland) 2000	Group stage	3	1	1	1	8	10
(England) 2001	Group stage	3	0	1	2	1	4
Total	9/19	35	12	9	14	41	54

== Current squad ==
The following players were called up for the friendlies against Norway on 13 and 15 June 2023.

Caps and goals as of 1 April 2023, after the game against Northern Ireland.

No.	Pos.	Player	Date of birth (age)	Caps	Goals	Club
	GK	Kornel Miściur	27 April 2007 (age 19)	0	0	(The Football Association) Liverpool
	DF	Kacper Potulski	19 October 2007 (age 19)	7	0	(German Football Association) Mainz 05
	DF	Dawid Mazurek	30 March 2007 (age 19)	7	0	(Polish Football Association) Górnik Zabrze
	DF	Bartosz Kriegler	29 June 2007 (age 19)	2	0	(Polish Football Association) Górnik II Zabrze
	DF	Jakub Jaroszuk	16 February 2007 (age 19)	0	0	(Polish Football Association) Jagiellonia Białystok
	DF	Damian Sokołowski	18 February 2007 (age 19)	0	0	(Polish Football Association) Lech Poznań
	DF	Dawid Szwiec	2 August 2007 (age 19)	0	0	(Polish Football Association) Górnik Zabrze
	DF	Bartłomiej Zieliński	19 April 2007 (age 19)	0	0	(Polish Football Association) Raków Częstochowa
	MF	Mateusz Dziewiatowski	28 June 2007 (age 19)	6	1	(Polish Football Association) Zagłębie Lubin
	MF	Cyprian Popielec	7 March 2007 (age 19)	6	1	(Polish Football Association) Zagłębie Lubin
	MF	Kacper Szulc	14 June 2007 (age 19)	5	2	(Polish Football Association) Zagłębie Lubin
	MF	Hubert Jasiak	1 January 2007 (age 19)	4	3	(Polish Football Association) Górnik Zabrze
	MF	Bartosz Mazurek	3 January 2007 (age 19)	2	1	(Polish Football Association) Jagiellonia Białystok
	MF	Igor Stankiewicz	20 June 2007 (age 19)	1	0	(Polish Football Association) Lech Poznań
	MF	Jakub Adkonis	10 June 2007 (age 19)	0	0	(Polish Football Association) Legia Warsaw
	MF	Fabian Bzdyl	2 December 2007 (age 18)	0	0	(Polish Football Association) Cracovia
	MF	Dominik Sarapata	25 October 2007 (age 19)	0	0	(Polish Football Association) Górnik Zabrze
	MF	Mateusz Szczepaniak	5 January 2007 (age 19)	0	0	(Polish Football Association) Legia Warsaw
	FW	Kamil Jakóbczyk	23 October 2007 (age 19)	6	2	(Polish Football Association) Lech Poznań
	FW	Tobiasz Mras		0	0	(Polish Football Association) Raków Częstochowa

== Honours ==
- UEFA European Under-16 Championship
  - Champions: 1993
  - Runners-up: 1999
  - Third place: 1990

== See also ==
- Poland national football team
- Poland Olympic football team
- Poland national under-21 football team
- Poland national under-20 football team
- Poland national under-19 football team
- Poland national under-18 football team
- Poland national under-17 football team
