= France national under-16 football team =

National under-16 association football team representing France

France
- Nickname(s): Les Bleuets (The Little Blues); Les Tricolores (The Tri-colours)
- Association: French Football Federation
- Confederation: UEFA (Europe)
- Head coach: Patrick Gonfalone
- FIFA code: FRA
First colours	Second colours

The France national under-16 football team is the national under-16 football team of France and is controlled by the French Football Federation. The team previously competed in the annual UEFA European Under-16 Football Championship before it was renamed into an under-17 competition in 2002. The under-16 team competes in regional tournaments, such as the Tournoi de Val-de-Marne and the Montaigu Tournament and international tournaments, such as the Aegean Cup.

Prior to the UEFA European Under-16 Football Championship being renamed into an under-17 event, France never won the competition, but finished as runners-up on two occasions in 1996 and 2001.

== Players ==
=== Current squad ===
- The following players have been called up to participate in the April 2022 friendly matches against Portugal and Belgium.

Caps and goals updated as of 14 April 2022, before the match against Belgium.

No.	Pos.	Player	Date of birth (age)	Caps	Goals	Club
1	GK	Romain Jean-Baptiste	21 February 2006 (age 20)	5	0	(French Football Federation) Metz
16	GK	Paul Argney	23 May 2006 (age 20)	1	0	(French Football Federation) Le Havre
2	DF	Aymen Sadi	10 April 2006 (age 20)	5	0	(French Football Federation) Valenciennes
5	DF	Arthur Tchaptchet	10 May 2006 (age 20)	5	0	(French Football Federation) Reims
12	DF	Mathis Coudoir	8 February 2006 (age 20)	2	0	(French Football Federation) Monaco (Note: Monaco is a Monégasque club playing in the French football league system.)
15	DF	Travis Chillard Martin	7 March 2012 (age 14)	2	0	(French Football Federation) Arsenal
—	DF	Nhoa Sangui	27 February 2006 (age 20)	4	0	(French Football Federation) Reims
—	DF	Dan Sinaté	9 June 2006 (age 20)	4	0	(French Football Federation) Monaco
—	DF	Bastien Mepiyou Menadjou	19 March 2006 (age 20)	2	0	(French Football Federation) Nantes
6	MF	Saïmon Bouabré	1 June 2006 (age 20)	8	1	(French Football Federation) Monaco
8	MF	Nolan Ferro	18 January 2006 (age 20)	3	0	(French Football Federation) Strasbourg
13	MF	Fodé Sylla	15 April 2006 (age 20)	8	0	(French Football Federation) Lens
17	MF	Daouda Troaré	22 July 2006 (age 20)	3	0	(French Football Federation) Nice
7	FW	Willsem Boussaid	30 January 2006 (age 20)	7	0	(French Football Federation) Strasbourg
9	FW	Tidiam Gomis	8 August 2006 (age 20)	7	0	(French Football Federation) Caen
10	FW	Mohamed Amine Bouchenna	15 June 2006 (age 20)	8	5	(French Football Federation) Clermont
11	FW	Emmanuel Mbondo	5 February 2006 (age 20)	8	3	(French Football Federation) Auxerre
18	FW	Nordan Mukiele	12 February 2006 (age 20)	3	1	(French Football Federation) Rennes
20	FW	Bilal Fofana	7 July 2006 (age 20)	3	1	(French Football Federation) Paris F.C.
20	FW	Eli Junior Kroupi	23 June 2006 (age 20)	6	3	(French Football Federation) Lorient

== Competitive record ==
=== UEFA European U-16 Football Championship record ===
Year	Round	GP	W	D*	L	GS	GA
(Italy) 1982	did not qualify	-	-	-	-	-	-
(Germany) 1984	did not qualify	-	-	-	-	-	-
(Hungary) 1985	Fifth place	3	2	0	1	7	2
(Greece) 1986	15th place	3	1	0	2	3	6
(France) 1987	Third place	5	3	2	0	9	2
(Spain) 1988	8th place	3	1	1	1	2	2
(Denmark) 1989	Third place	5	3	1	1	10	8
(Germany) 1990	9th place	3	0	2	1	2	4
(Switzerland) 1991	Fourth place*	5	2	3	0	9	3
(Cyprus) 1992	11th place	3	0	1	2	1	3
(Turkey) 1993	Fourth place	5	2	2	1	9	5
(Republic of Ireland) 1994	did not qualify	-	-	-	-	-	-
(Belgium) 1995	Fourth place	5	3	0	2	7	6
(Austria) 1996	Runners-up	6	4	1	1	7	1
(Germany) 1997	did not qualify	-	-	-	-	-	-
(Scotland) 1998	did not qualify	-	-	-	-	-	-
(Czech Republic) 1999	did not qualify	-	-	-	-	-	-
(Israel) 2000	did not qualify	-	-	-	-	-	-
(England) 2001	Runners-up	6	5	0	1	17	1
Total	12/19	52	26	13	13	83	43

*Draws include knockout matches decided by penalty shootout.
**Gold background colour indicates that the tournament was won. Red border colour indicates tournament was held on home soil.

== Honours ==
- UEFA European Under-16 Football Championship

Finalists (2): 1996, 2001

- Val-de-Marne Tournament

Champions (7): 1999, 2000, 2001, 2002, 2004, 2005, 2011

- Montaigu Tournament

Champions (9): 1976, 1977, 1983, 1996, 1997, 1998, 2001, 2005, 2006,

- Aegean Cup

Champions (6): 2001, 2009, 2010, 2011, 2012, 2013
