= Israel national under-17 football team =

National association football team

Israel under-17
- Association: Israel Football Association
- Confederation: UEFA (Europe)
- Head coach: Gadi Brumer
- Most caps: Mohammad Ghadir; Omer Peretz (17 each)
- Top scorer: Maor Buzaglo (9)
- FIFA code: ISR
First colours	Second colours

European U-17 Championship
- Appearances: 11 (first in 1987)
- Best result: Third place (1996)

FIFA U-17 World Cup
- Appearances: 0

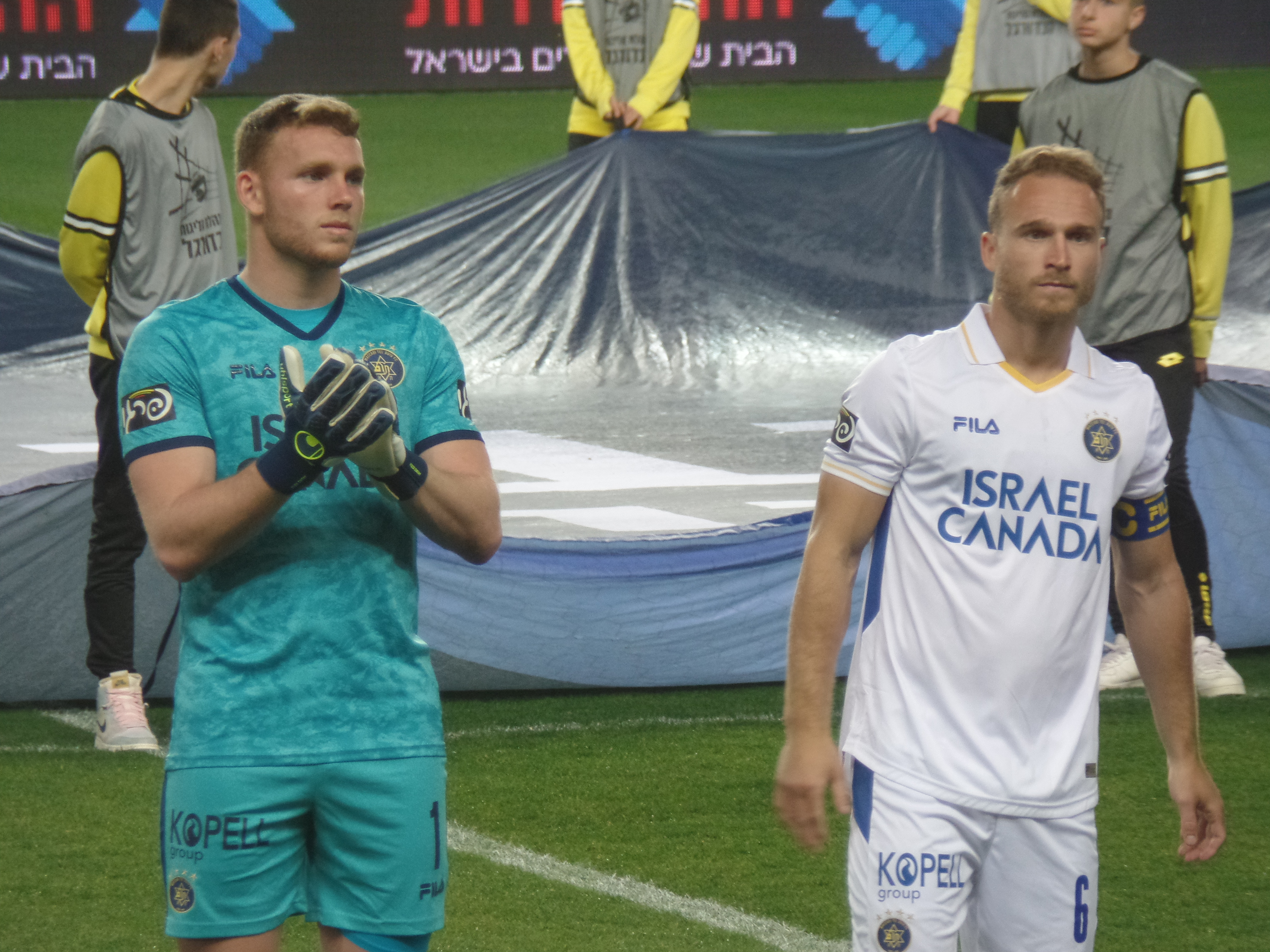
Goalkeeper Daniel Peretz and midfielder Dan Glazer both played numerous games for the Israel national under-17 football team

The Israel national under-17 football team represents Israel in association football at the under-17 youth level, and is controlled by the Israel Football Association.

The team is for Israeli players aged 17 or under at the start of a two-year European Under-17 Football Championship cycle, so players can be up to 17 years old.

== Competition history ==
Although the Israel Football Association became a member of UEFA as late as 1994, Israel U-16s took part in several European youth championships since the late 1980s, beginning with the 1987 European U-16 tournament, for which they qualified but failed to progress past the group stage after a defeat to Turkey U16s and draws against Denmark and Greece.

The team managed to qualify for six other European U-16 championships (including five consecutive appearances between 1996 and 2000) before UEFA's renaming of youth levels in 2001. Since then, Israel U17s only qualified twice for the final tournament, in 2003 and 2005. Their best result in the under-16 era came in the 1996 European U-16 Championship where they won third place, beating Greece in a third-place play-off match.

=== European Championship ===
==== Under-16 format ====
Year	Round	GP	W	D	L	GS	GA	GD
(France) 1987	Group stage	3	0	2	1	1	2	-1
(Spain) 1988	did not enter							
(Denmark) 1989	did not qualify							
(East Germany) 1990	did not enter							
(Switzerland) 1991	did not qualify							
(Cyprus) 1992	Group stage	3	1	1	1	3	3	0
(Turkey) 1993	did not qualify							
(Republic of Ireland) 1994	did not qualify							
(Belgium) 1995	did not qualify							
(Austria) 1996	Third place	6	4	0	2	10	9	+1
(Germany) 1997	Group stage	3	0	0	3	3	8	–5
(Scotland) 1998	Quarter-finals	4	1	2	1	5	6	–1
(Czech Republic) 1999	Quarter-finals	4	2	0	2	8	10	–2
(Israel) 2000	Group stage	3	0	1	2	3	7	–4
(England) 2001	did not qualify							
Total	7/15	33	15	6	12	36	46	–10

==== Under-17 format ====
Year	Round	GP	W	D	L	GS	GA	GD
(Denmark) 2002	did not qualify							
(Portugal) 2003	Group stage	3	0	0	3	1	9	–8
(France) 2004	did not qualify							
(Italy) 2005	Group stage	3	0	0	3	3	9	–6
(Luxembourg) 2006	did not qualify							
(Belgium) 2007	did not qualify							
(Turkey) 2008	did not qualify							
(Germany) 2009	did not qualify							
(Liechtenstein) 2010	did not qualify							
(Serbia) 2011	did not qualify							
(Slovenia) 2012	did not qualify							
(Slovakia) 2013	did not qualify							
(Malta) 2014	did not qualify							
(Bulgaria) 2015	did not qualify							
(Azerbaijan) 2016	did not qualify							
(Croatia) 2017	did not qualify							
(England) 2018	Group stage	3	0	0	3	1	7	–6
(Republic of Ireland) 2019	did not qualify							
(Estonia) 2020	Cancelled due to COVID-19 pandemic in Europe							
(Cyprus) 2021	Cancelled due to COVID-19 pandemic in Europe							
(Israel) 2022	Group stage	3	1	0	2	3	4	–1
(Hungary) 2023	did not qualify							
(Cyprus) 2024	withdrew							
(Albania) 2025	Did not qualify							
(Estonia) 2026	Did not qualify							
(Latvia) 2027	Did not qualify							
(Lithuania) 2028	To be determined							
(Moldova) 2029	To be determined							
Total	4/19	12	1	0	11	8	29	–21

=== Past squads ===
UEFA European Under-17 Championship squads

- 2003 UEFA European Under-17 Championship squad
- 2005 UEFA European Under-17 Championship squad
- 2018 UEFA European Under-17 Championship squad
- 2022 UEFA European Under-17 Championship squad

== Players ==
=== Current squad ===
- The following players were called up for the 2026 UEFA European Under-17 Championship qualification matches.
- Match dates: 25, 28 and 31 March 2026
- Opposition: Estonia, England and Faroe Islands
- Caps and goals correct as of: 31 March 2026, after the match against Faroe Islands

No.	Pos.	Player	Date of birth (age)	Caps	Goals	Club
	GK	Yanal Bazdog	4 June 2009 (age 17)	7	0	(Israel Football Association) Hapoel Tel Aviv
	GK	Emanuel Luca	1 August 2009 (age 17)	5	0	(Israel Football Association) Maccabi Tel Aviv
	DF	Sahar Lavi	23 May 2009 (age 17)	13	0	(Israel Football Association) Maccabi Tel Aviv
	DF	Tamir Bar	3 December 2009 (age 16)	10	2	(Israel Football Association) Maccabi Petah Tikva
	DF	Tomer Peleg	11 May 2009 (age 17)	10	1	(Israel Football Association) Maccabi Petah Tikva
	DF	Shai Vacsman	26 October 2009 (age 17)	9	0	(Israel Football Association) Hapoel Tel Aviv
	DF	Noam Shmuel	15 September 2009 (age 17)	8	0	(Israel Football Association) Maccabi Petah Tikva
	DF	Artyom Demchuk	1 April 2009 (age 17)	1	0	(Israel Football Association) Maccabi Haifa
	MF	Ben Dajani	15 April 2009 (age 17)	12	0	(Israel Football Association) Maccabi Tel Aviv
	MF	Idan Dadia	23 July 2009 (age 17)	11	3	(Israel Football Association) Hapoel Haifa
	MF	Ido Berko	31 July 2009 (age 17)	10	0	(Israel Football Association) Maccabi Petah Tikva
	MF	Daniel Ben-Shushan	1 January 2009 (age 17)	9	3	(Israel Football Association) Maccabi Tel Aviv
	MF	Fuad Ganayem	1 July 2009 (age 17)	6	2	(Israel Football Association) Hapoel Tel Aviv
	MF	Ido Yosef	1 August 2009 (age 17)	6	2	(Israel Football Association) Maccabi Tel Aviv
	MF	Daniel Dudi	1 July 2009 (age 17)	4	0	(Israel Football Association) Maccabi Tel Aviv
	MF	Noam Goldenberg	22 January 2010 (age 16)	2	1	(Israel Football Association) Maccabi Haifa
	MF	Noam Nuna	1 November 2009 (age 17)	2	0	(Israel Football Association) Hapoel Tel Aviv
	FW	Erez Didi	24 August 2009 (age 17)	11	2	(Israel Football Association) Maccabi Petah Tikva
	FW	Ben Zuares	5 October 2009 (age 17)	10	1	(Israel Football Association) Maccabi Petah Tikva
	FW	Yarin Abuhatzera	1 July 2010 (age 16)	5	2	(Israel Football Association) Maccabi Netanya

=== Recent call-ups ===
Pos.	Player	Date of birth (age)	Caps	Goals	Club	Latest call-up
DF	Itay Kerem	1 April 2009 (age 17)	2	0	(Israel) Maccabi Petah Tikva	v. Greece, 16 February 2026
MF	Omer Kanchiorek	1 March 2009 (age 17)	3	0	(Israel) Maccabi Haifa	v. Greece, 16 February 2026
MF	Dor Goldstein	1 April 2009 (age 17)	3	0	(Israel) Maccabi Haifa	v. Greece, 16 February 2026
MF	Amit Newton	1 February 2010 (age 16)	2	0	(Israel) Maccabi Haifa	v. Greece, 16 February 2026
FW	Noam Azrane	2 November 2010 (age 16)	8	1	(Israel) Maccabi Tel Aviv	v. Greece, 16 February 2026

== See also ==
- UEFA European Under-17 Championship
- Israel national football team
- Israel national under-21 football team
- Israel national under-19 football team
- Israel national under-18 football team
- Israel national under-16 football team
