= Turkey national under-16 football team =

National association football team

Turkey U16
- Nickname: Genç Milliler
- Association: Turkish Football Federation (TFF)
- Confederation: UEFA (Europe)
- Head coach: Güngör Öztürk
- Most caps: Sabri Sarıoğlu (39)
- Top scorer: Semih Şentürk, Enes Ünal (25)
- FIFA code: TUR
First colours	Second colours

First international
- Turkey 0–0 Greece (Orléans, France; 25 May 1987)

Biggest win
- Moldova 2–9 Turkey (Vadul lui Vodă, Moldova; 21 November 2018)

Biggest defeat
- Turkey 0-5 Norway (Čakovec, Croatia; 24 April 2023)

The Turkey national under-16 football team is the association football team that represents the nation of Turkey at the under-16 level.

The Turkey U-16 team, being a part of the UEFA development programmes, also competes in the UEFA tournaments to give opportunities to elite youth talent.

== Fixtures ==
=== Friendlies ===
28 January 2026	Turkey	1–1	Ukraine	Arslan Zeki Demirci Sports Complex, Manavgat
13:00	Haktan Yılmaz 20'	Report	Yehor Shevchenko 35'	Referee: Burak Akdağ (Turkey)

30 January 2026	Turkey	2–1	Czech Republic	Arslan Zeki Demirci Sports Complex, Manavgat
12:00	Metehan Eksiner 29', 71'	Report	Jan Bindr 14'	Referee: Mazlum Doğan Bodur (Turkey)

3 June 2026	Romania	0–0	Turkey	CNF Buftea, Buftea
18:00		Report		Referee: Claudiu Filip (Romania)

6 June 2026	Turkey	2–1	Georgia	CNF Buftea, Buftea
17:00	Çakıroğlu 19'; Kabaktaş 63'	Report	Kvaratskhelia 26'	Referee: Raul Cupu (Romania)

== Current squad ==
- The following players were called up for the Dörtlü Turnuva (Tournament of Four) held in Kayseri from 14 to 18 September.
- Match dates: 14 - 18 September 2024
- Caps and goals correct as of: 18 September 2024, after the match against Portugal

No.	Pos.	Player	Date of birth (age)	Caps	Goals	Club
	GK	Sadullah Yiğit Kabakuşak	1 January 2009 (age 17)	2	0	(Turkish Football Federation) Antalyaspor
	GK	Hüseyin İşlek	1 January 2009 (age 17)	1	0	(Turkish Football Federation) Pendikspor
	GK	Cem Efe Eroğlu	4 July 2009 (age 17)	2	0	(Turkish Football Federation) Altınordu
	DF	Yağız Fikri Şen	11 March 2009 (age 17)	4	0	(Turkish Football Federation) Fenerbahçe
	DF	Hasan Mert Tuncel	1 January 2009 (age 17)	5	1	(Turkish Football Federation) Beşiktaş
	DF	Üveys Yasir Satık	27 June 2009 (age 17)	4	0	(Turkish Football Federation) Antalyaspor
	DF	Vatan Karanfil	17 March 2009 (age 17)	3	0	(Turkish Football Federation) Antalyaspor
	DF	Bilal Demirağ	27 April 2009 (age 17)	4	0	(Turkish Football Federation) Altınordu
	DF	Ramazan Özçelik	1 January 2009 (age 17)	4	0	(Turkish Football Federation) Antalyaspor
	DF	Berke Yıldırım	2 April 2009 (age 17)	2	0	(Turkish Football Federation) Ankaragücü
	DF	Yasin Akçay	14 January 2009 (age 17)	1	0	(Turkish Football Federation) Trabzonspor
	DF	Ali Emir Esen	24 January 2009 (age 17)	1	0	(Turkish Football Federation) Galatasaray
	MF	Yaman Suakar	25 February 2009 (age 17)	3	0	(Turkish Football Federation) Kasımpaşa
	MF	Emirhan Ateş	16 January 2009 (age 17)	2	0	(Turkish Football Federation) Fenerbahçe
	MF	Alaettin Ekici	1 January 2009 (age 17)	1	0	(Turkish Football Federation) Fenerbahçe
	MF	Tarık Buğra Kalpaklı	6 April 2009 (age 17)	1	0	(Turkish Football Federation) Fatih Karagümrük
	MF	Mustafa Duru	22 May 2009 (age 17)	4	2	(Turkish Football Federation) Altınordu
	MF	Necati Oğulcan Yançel	1 June 2009 (age 17)	4	0	(Turkish Football Federation) Galatasaray
	MF	Baran Yolaçan	29 August 2009 (age 17)	4	0	(Turkish Football Federation) Altınordu
	MF	Hasan Yakub İlçin	24 March 2009 (age 17)	5	2	(Turkish Football Federation) Antalyaspor
	MF	Adnan Efe Fettahoğlu	20 April 2009 (age 17)	3	1	(Turkish Football Federation) Fenerbahçe
	MF	Ali Demirbilek	5 January 2009 (age 17)	4	1	(Turkish Football Federation) Antalyaspor
	MF	Yiğit Metin Yumak	25 April 2009 (age 17)	3	0	(Turkish Football Federation) Göztepe
	FW	Ada Yüzgeç	3 April 2009 (age 17)	3	4	(Turkish Football Federation) Galatasaray
	FW	Hüseyin Şen	13 January 2009 (age 17)	4	2	(Turkish Football Federation) Alanyaspor

== U16 B Team ==
As a feeder team for the under-16 team, a secondary squad was chosen lastly in 2019 to participate at the 20th version of Aegean Cup, coached by Mehmet Yıldırım.
