= East Germany national under-16 football team =

East Germany U-16/17
- Association: Deutscher Fußball-Verband der DDR
- Confederation: UEFA (Europe)
- Head coach: -
- FIFA code: GDR
First colours	Second colours

FIFA U-17 World Cup
- Appearances: 1 (first in 1989)
- Best result: Quarterfinals, 1989

UEFA European Under-17 Football Championship
- Appearances: 6 (first in 1985)
- Best result: Runners-up, 1989

The East Germany junior football team was the under-16 (continental competitions) and under-17 (world competitions) football team of East Germany.

After German reunification in 1990, the Deutscher Fußball Verband der DDR (DFV), and with it the East German team, joined the Deutscher Fußball Bund (DFB).

== Competitive record ==
=== UEFA U-16 Championship record ===
UEFA U-16/17 European Championship record									UEFA U-16/17 Championship Qualification record						
Year	Round	Pld	W	D	L	GF	GA	GD	Pld	W	D	L	GF	GA	GD
(Italy) 1982	Did not qualify								8	3	3	2	9	8	+1
(West Germany) 1984	Did not qualify								6	1	2	3	7	10	−3
(Hungary) 1985	Fourth place	5	1	2	2	5	7	−2	2	2	0	0	4	2	+2
(Greece) 1986	Fourth place	5	2	3	0	8	5	+3	4	4	0	0	6	1	+5
(France) 1987	Group stage	3	0	1	2	2	6	−4	2	1	1	0	3	2	+1
(Spain) 1988	Third Place	5	1	3	1	3	6	−3	2	1	0	1	3	1	+2
(Denmark) 1989	Runners-up	5	2	2	1	8	7	+1	2	1	1	0	3	1	+2
(East Germany) 1990	Group stage	3	0	1	2	2	5	−3	0	0	0	0	0	0	0

=== FIFA U-17 World Cup record ===
FIFA U-17 World Cup record
Year	Round	Pld	W	D	L	GF	GA	GD
(China) 1985	Did not qualify							
(Canada) 1987	Did not qualify							
(Scotland) 1989	Quarter-finals	4	2	0	2	7	5	+2
Total	Quarter-finals	4	2	0	2	7	5	+2

== See also ==
- UEFA European Under-17 Football Championship
- FIFA U-17 World Cup
