= Czechoslovakia national under-16 football team =

Team of Czechoslovak football player under 17 years

Czechoslovakia U-16/17
- Association: Czechoslovak Football Association
- Confederation: UEFA (Europe)
- FIFA code: TCH
First colours	Second colours

FIFA U-16/17 World Cup
- Appearances: 1
- Best result: Quarterfinals, 1993

UEFA European Under-16 Football Championship
- Appearances: 5 (first in 1986)
- Best result: Winners, 1990

The Czechoslovakia junior football team was the under-16 (continental competitions) and under-17 (world competitions) football team of Czechoslovakia. It was controlled by the Czechoslovak Football Association.

Despite the dissolution of Czechoslovakia in January 1993, the team played until May 1994. The present-day Czech Republic national under-17 football team is recognized as the successor of the Czechoslovakia team. The country of Slovakia is represented by the Slovak U-17 national team.

== UEFA U-16 Championship record ==
UEFA U-16 European Championship record									UEFA U-16 Championship Qualification record						
Year	Round	Pld	W	D	L	GF	GA	GD	Pld	W	D	L	GF	GA	GD
(Italy) 1982	Did not qualify								6	3	2	1	11	4	+7
(West Germany) 1984	Did not qualify								6	4	0	2	9	9	0
(Hungary) 1985	Did not qualify								2	0	0	2	0	3	−3
(Greece) 1986	Group stage	3	1	1	1	5	3	+2	4	1	0	3	3	5	−2
(France) 1987	Group stage	3	0	2	1	2	3	−1	2	2	0	0	8	0	+8
(Spain) 1988	Did not qualify								2	1	0	1	2	2	0
(Denmark) 1989	Did not qualify								2	0	0	2	0	3	−3
(East Germany) 1990	Champions	5	3	2	0	8	2	+6	2	2	0	0	14	0	+14
(Switzerland) 1991	Did not qualify								2	1	0	1	2	3	−1
(Cyprus) 1992	Did not qualify								2	1	0	1	2	2	0
(Turkey) 1993	Third place	6	4	2	0	9	2	+7	2	1	1	0	1	0	+1
(Republic of Ireland) 1994	Group stage	3	1	0	2	2	4	−2	2	1	0	1	3	2	+1

=== FIFA U-16/17 World Cup record ===
FIFA U-16/17 World Cup record
Year	Round	Pld	W	D	L	GF	GA	GD
(China) 1985	Did not qualify							
(Canada) 1987	Did not qualify							
(Scotland) 1989	Did not qualify							
(Italy) 1991	Did not qualify							
(Japan) 1993	Quarter-finals	4	2	1	1	8	7	+1
Total	Quarter-finals	4	2	1	1	8	7	+1

== See also ==
- UEFA European Under-17 Football Championship
- FIFA U-17 World Cup
