= Northern Ireland national under-16 football team =

National U-16 association football team

Northern Ireland Under-16 Schools
- Nickname(s): The GAWA, Norn Iron
- Association: Irish Football Association
- Confederation: UEFA (Europe)
- Home stadium: various
- FIFA code: NIR
First colours	Second colours

First international
- NI Schools (Northern Ireland) 0–5 Scotland Schools (21 May 1927, Solitude)

The Northern Ireland national under-16 schools football team (also known as Northern Ireland schoolboys, under-16s or U16) represents Northern Ireland in association football at under-16 level. It is controlled by the Northern Ireland Schools Football Association (NISFA) which is affiliated to the Irish Football Association. The main competition competed for by the team is the Victory Shield which has been competed for since 1925 by the same four teams (England, Northern Ireland, Scotland and Wales). The Northern Ireland under-16 side also competes regularly in other minor tournaments and in friendlies. The team had previously been fielded at under-15 level and games are still sometimes arranged at this age group level with the agreement of the opposition association.

== Honours ==
- European Schools Champions: 1979
- Victory Shield Winners: 2000

== Current squad ==
- The following players were called up for the Victory Shield.
- Match dates: 30 October–4 November 2022
- Opposition: Scotland, the Republic of Ireland and Wales
- Caps and goals correct as of: 4 November 2022, after the match against Wales

No.	Pos.	Player	Date of birth (age)	Caps	Goals	Club
	GK	Will Murdock	26 May 2007 (age 19)	3	0	(The Football Association) Manchester United
	GK	Josh Gracey		3	0	(Irish Football Association) Glenavon
	DF	Conor McVeigh		3	0	(Irish Football Association) Linfield
	DF	Conor Haughey (Captain)		4	0	(Irish Football Association) Glentoran
	DF	Calum Moreland	15 February 2007 (age 19)	4	1	(Irish Football Association) Linfield
	DF	Callum Cowan		5	0	(Irish Football Association) Linfield
	DF	Caoimhan McDermott		3	0	(Irish Football Association) Derry City
	DF	Alex Watson		2	0	(Irish Football Association) Linfield
	DF	Noah McDonnell		3	0	(Irish Football Association) Linfield
	MF	Blaine McClure		5	1	(Irish Football Association) Linfield
	MF	Fionn Duffy		3	0	(Irish Football Association) Derry City
	MF	Jack Doherty	2 January 2007 (age 19)	4	0	(Irish Football Association) Derry City
	MF	Callum Burnside	16 January 2007 (age 19)	4	3	(Irish Football Association) Linfield
	MF	Dylan Stitt		5	0	(Irish Football Association) Linfield
	MF	Oili McCart		4	0	(Irish Football Association) Cliftonville
	MF	Troy Savage		5	0	(Irish Football Association) Castle Juniors
	FW	Cole Brannigan		5	0	(Irish Football Association) Linfield
	FW	Oscar Kelly	5 February 2007 (age 19)	4	2	(The Football Association) Rochdale
	FW	Sean Corry		4	0	(Irish Football Association) Ballinamallard United
	FW	Mikey Harkin		2	0	(Irish Football Association) Derry City
	FW	Chris Atherton	19 October 2008 (age 18)	5	1	(Irish Football Association) Glenavon
	FW	Ceadach O'Neill		3	0	(Irish Football Association) Linfield

== See also ==
- Northern Ireland national football team
- Northern Ireland national under-17 football team
