= UEFA European Under-17 Championship =

- Organiser(s): UEFA
- Founded: 1980
- Region: Europe
- Teams: Maximum of 54 (qualifying round); 32 (elite round); 8 (finals)
- Related competitions: UEFA European Under-21 Championship; UEFA European Under-19 Championship
- Current champions: Italy (3rd title)
- Most championships: Spain (9 titles)
- Website: uefa.com/under17
- 2026 UEFA European Under-17 Championship

The UEFA European Under-17 Championship, or simply the Euro Under-17, is an annual football competition contested by the men's under-17 national teams of the UEFA member associations.

Spain is the most successful team in this competition, having won nine titles. Portugal are the current champions, having won their 7th title following a 3–0 victory over France in the 2025 final.

== History and format ==
The current competition format consists of three stages: a qualifying round, an elite round and a final tournament. The first stage takes place in autumn of the previous year, while the elite round is played in spring. The winners of each elite round group join the host team in the final tournament, played in May.

Until the 1997 tournament, players born on or after 1 August the year they turned 17 years were eligible to compete. Since the 1998 tournament, the date limit has been moved back to 1 January. In 2001/2002 the competition was renamed European Under-17 Championship, but the eligibility rules did not change.

Evolution of the competition format and number of participating teams
| Years | Format | Number of teams |
|---|---|---|
| 1982–1984 | Semi-finals, third place play-off and final | 4 |
| 1985–1992 | Four groups of four teams, semi-finals, third place play-off and final | 16 |
| 1993–2002 | Four groups of four teams, quarter-finals, semi-finals, third place play-off and final | 16 |
| 2003–2006 | Two groups of four teams, semi-finals, third place play-off and final | 8 |
| 2007–2014 | Two groups of four teams, semi-finals and final | 8 |
| 2015–2024 | Four groups of four teams, quarter-finals, play-offs between quarter-final losers (in odd years only, for qualifying to FIFA U-17 World Cup), semi-finals, and final | 16 |
| 2025– | Two groups of four teams, semi-finals and final | 8 |

== Results ==
| Edition | Year | Host | Final | | | Third place match (1982–2006) Losing semi-finalists (2007–present)^{(1)} | | |
| Edition | Year | Host | Winner | Score | Runner-up | Third place | Score | Fourth place |
|---|---|---|---|---|---|---|---|---|
1982–2001: UEFA European Under-16 Championship
| 1 | 1982; Details | Italy | Italy | 1–0 | West Germany | Yugoslavia | 0–0 (4–2 p) | Finland |
| 2 | 1984; Details | West Germany | West Germany | 2–0 | Soviet Union | England | 1–0 | Yugoslavia |
| 3 | 1985; Details | Hungary | Soviet Union | 4–0 | Greece | Spain | 1–0 | East Germany |
| 4 | 1986; Details | Greece | Spain | 2–1 | Italy | Soviet Union | 1–1 (9–8 p) | East Germany |
| 5 | 1987; Details | France | Italy (Title not awarded) | ~~(1–0)~~ | Soviet Union | France | 3–0 | Turkey |
| 6 | 1988; Details | Spain | Spain | 0–0 (4–2 p) | Portugal | East Germany | 0–0 (5–4 p) | West Germany |
| 7 | 1989; Details | Denmark | Portugal | 4–1 | East Germany | France | 3–2 | Spain |
| 8 | 1990; Details | East Germany | Czechoslovakia | 3–2 (a.e.t.) | Yugoslavia | Poland | 3–2 | Portugal |
| 9 | 1991; Details | Switzerland | Spain | 2–0 | Germany | Greece | 1–1 (5–4 p) | France |
| 10 | 1992; Details | Cyprus | Germany | 2–1 | Spain | Italy | 1–0 | Portugal |
| 11 | 1993; Details | Turkey | Poland | 1–0 | Italy | Czechoslovakia | 2–1 | France |
| 12 | 1994; Details | Republic of Ireland | Turkey | 1–0 | Denmark | Ukraine | 2–0 | Austria |
| 13 | 1995; Details | Belgium | Portugal | 2–0 | Spain | Germany | 2–1 (a.e.t.) | France |
| 14 | 1996; Details | Austria | Portugal | 1–0 | France | Israel | 3–2 | Greece |
| 15 | 1997; Details | Germany | Spain | 0–0 (5–4 p) | Austria | Germany | 3–1 | Switzerland |
| 16 | 1998; Details | Scotland | Republic of Ireland | 2–1 | Italy | Spain | 2–1 | Portugal |
| 17 | 1999; Details | Czech Republic | Spain | 4–1 | Poland | Germany | 2–1 | Czech Republic |
| 18 | 2000; Details | Israel | Portugal | 2–1 (g.g.) | Czech Republic | Netherlands | 5–0 | Greece |
| 19 | 2001; Details | England | Spain | 1–0 | France | Croatia | 4–1 | England |
Since 2002: UEFA European Under-17 Championship
| 20 | 2002; Details | Denmark | Switzerland | 0–0 (4–2 p) | France | England | 4–1 | Spain |
| 21 | 2003; Details | Portugal | Portugal | 2–1 | Spain | Austria | 1–0 | England |
| 22 | 2004; Details | France | France | 2–1 | Spain | Portugal | 4–4 (3–2 p) | England |
| 23 | 2005; Details | Italy | Turkey | 2–0 | Netherlands | Italy | 2–1 (a.e.t.) | Croatia |
| 24 | 2006; Details | Luxembourg | Russia | 2–2 (5–3 p) | Czech Republic | Spain | 1–1 (3–2 p) | Germany |
| 25 | 2007; Details | Belgium | Spain | 1–0 | England | Belgium and France | | |
| 26 | 2008; Details | Turkey | Spain | 4–0 | France | Netherlands and Turkey | | |
| 27 | 2009; Details | Germany | Germany | 2–1 (a.e.t.) | Netherlands | Italy and Switzerland | | |
| 28 | 2010; Details | Liechtenstein | England | 2–1 | Spain | France and Turkey | | |
| 29 | 2011; Details | Serbia | Netherlands | 5–2 | Germany | Denmark and England | | |
| 30 | 2012; Details | Slovenia | Netherlands | 1–1 (5–4 p) | Germany | Georgia and Poland | | |
| 31 | 2013; Details | Slovakia | Russia | 0–0 (5–4 p) | Italy | Slovakia and Sweden | | |
| 32 | 2014; Details | Malta | England | 1–1 (4–1 p) | Netherlands | Portugal and Scotland | | |
| 33 | 2015; Details | Bulgaria | France | 4–1 | Germany | Belgium and Russia | | |
| 34 | 2016; Details | Azerbaijan | Portugal | 1–1 (5–4 p) | Spain | Germany and Netherlands | | |
| 35 | 2017; Details | Croatia | Spain | 2–2 (4–1 p) | England | Germany and Turkey | | |
| 36 | 2018; Details | England | Netherlands | 2–2 (4–1 p) | Italy | Belgium and England | | |
| 37 | 2019; Details | Republic of Ireland | Netherlands | 4–2 | Italy | France and Spain | | |
| – | ~~2020~~; Details | Estonia | Tournament cancelled due to COVID-19 pandemic | | | | | |
| – | ~~2021~~; Details | Cyprus | Tournament cancelled due to COVID-19 pandemic | | | | | |
| 38 | 2022; Details | Israel | France | 2–1 | Netherlands | Portugal and Serbia | | |
| 39 | 2023; Details | Hungary | Germany | 0–0 (5–4 p) | France | Poland and Spain | | |
| 40 | 2024; Details | Cyprus | Italy | 3–0 | Portugal | Denmark and Serbia | | |
| 41 | 2025; Details | Albania | Portugal | 3–0 | France | Belgium and Italy | | |
| 42 | 2026; Details | Estonia | Italy | 1–1 (4−3 p) | Belgium | France and Spain | | |
| 43 | 2027; Details | Latvia | | | | | | |
| 44 | 2028; Details | Lithuania | | | | | | |
| 45 | 2029; Details | Moldova | | | | | | |

^{1}No third place match has been played since 2007; losing semi-finalists are listed in alphabetical order.
- 1987 Title not awarded.
- Key:
  - a.e.t. – after extra time
  - g.g. – after golden goal
  - p – after penalty shoot-out

== Teams reaching the top four ==
| Country | Winners | Runners-up | Third-place | Fourth-place | Semi-finalists | Top 4 (from 36) |
|---|---|---|---|---|---|---|
| Spain | 9 (1986, 1988, 1991, 1997, 1999, 2001, 2007, 2008, 2017) | 6 (1990, 1995, 2003, 2004, 2010, 2016) | 3 (1985, 1998, 2006) | 2 (1989, 2002) | 3 (2019, 2023, 2026) | 23 |
| Portugal | 7 (1989, 1995, 1996, 2000, 2003, 2016, 2025) | 2 (1988, 2024) | 1 (2004) | 3 (1990, 1992, 1998) | 2 (2014, 2022) | 15 |
| Germany^{(2)} | 4 (1984, 1992, 2009, 2023) | 5 (1982, 1991, 2011, 2012, 2015) | 3 (1995, 1997, 1999) | 2 (1988, 2006) | 2 (2016, 2017) | 16 |
| Netherlands | 4 (2011, 2012, 2018, 2019) | 4 (2005, 2009, 2014, 2022) | 1 (2000) | | 2 (2008, 2016) | 11 |
| France | 3 (2004, 2015, 2022) | 6 (1996, 2001, 2002, 2008, 2023, 2025) | 2 (1987, 1989) | 3 (1991, 1993, 1995) | 4 (2007, 2010, 2019, 2026) | 18 |
| Italy | 3 (1982, 2024, 2026) | 6 (1986, 1993, 1998, 2013, 2018, 2019) | 2 (1992, 2005) | | 2 (2009, 2025) | 13 |
| Russia^{(3)} | 3 (1985, 2006, 2013) | 2 (1984, 1987) | 1 (1986) | | 1 (2015) | 7 |
| England | 2 (2010, 2014) | 2 (2007, 2017) | 2 (1984, 2002) | 3 (2001, 2003, 2004) | 2 (2011, 2018) | 11 |
| Turkey | 2 (1994, 2005) | | | 1 (1987) | 3 (2008, 2010, 2017) | 6 |
| Czech Republic^{(4)} | 1 (1990) | 2 (2000, 2006) | 1 (1993) | 1 (1999) | | 5 |
| Poland | 1 (1993) | 1 (1999) | 1 (1990) | | 2 (2012, 2023) | 5 |
| Slovakia^{(4)} | 1 (1990) | | 1 (1993) | | 1 (2013) | 3 |
| Switzerland | 1 (2002) | | | 1 (1997) | 1 (2009) | 3 |
| Republic of Ireland | 1 (1998) | | | | | 1 |
| Greece | | 1 (1985) | 1 (1991) | 2 (1996, 2000) | | 4 |
| East Germany^{(6)} | | 1 (1989) | 1 (1988) | 2 (1985, 1986) | | 4 |
| Serbia^{(5)} | | 1 (1990) | 1 (1982) | 1 (1984) | 2 (2022, 2024) | 5 |
| Austria | | 1 (1997) | 1 (2003) | 1 (1994) | | 3 |
| Belgium | | 1 (2026) | | | 4 (2007, 2015, 2018, 2025) | 5 |
| Denmark | | 1 (1994) | | | 2 (2011, 2024) | 3 |
| Croatia^{(5)} | | | 1 (2001) | 1 (2005) | | 2 |
| Israel | | | 1 (1996) | | | 1 |
| Ukraine^{(3)} | | | 1 (1994) | | | 1 |
| Finland | | | | 1 (1982) | | 1 |
| Georgia^{(3)} | | | | | 1 (2012) | 1 |
| Scotland | | | | | 1 (2014) | 1 |
| Sweden | | | | | 1 (2013) | 1 |

1 There was no match to determine 3rd place after the 2006 tournament.
2 Until 1990 known as West Germany.
3 Until 1991 as part Soviet Union.
4 Until 1994 as part Czechoslovakia.
5 Until 1992 as part Yugoslavia.
6 German Democratic Republic 1949–1990.

== Comprehensive team results by tournament ==
Legend:

- 1st – Champions
- 2nd – Runners-up
- 3rd – Third place
- 4th – Fourth place
- SF – Semi-finalists
- 5th-6th - Fifth to Sixth place
- QF – Quarter-finals
- GS – Group stage
- Q – Qualified for upcoming tournament
- TBD – To be determined
- •• – Qualified but withdrew
- • – Did not qualify
- × – Did not enter
- × – Withdrew / Banned / Entry not accepted by FIFA
- — Country not affiliated to UEFA at that time
- — Country did not exist or national team was inactive
- – Hosts
- – Not affiliated to FIFA

=== 1982—2001 ===
| Nation | 1982 (4) | 1984 (4) | 1985 (16) | 1986 (16) | 1987 (16) | 1988 (16) | 1989 (16) | 1990 (16) | 1991 (16) | 1992 (16) | 1993 (16) | 1994 (16) | 1995 (16) | 1996 (16) | 1997 (16) | 1998 (16) | 1999 (16) | 2000 (16) | 2001 (16) | Total |
|---|---|---|---|---|---|---|---|---|---|---|---|---|---|---|---|---|---|---|---|---|
| Albania | × | × | × | × | × | × | × | × | • | • | • | GS | • | • | • | × | • | • | • | 1 |
| Austria | • | • | • | GS | GS | GS | GS | • | • | • | • | 4th | GS | GS | 2nd | • | • | • | • | 7 |
| Belarus | | | | | | | | | | | × | QF | • | • | • | • | • | • | • | 1 |
| Belgium | • | • | • | • | • | GS | • | GS | • | • | QF | GS | QF | • | QF | • | • | • | • | 6 |
| Bulgaria | • | • | GS | GS | GS | • | GS | • | GS | • | • | • | • | • | • | • | • | • | • | 5 |
| Croatia | | | | | | | | | | | | × | × | GS | • | GS | GS | • | 3rd | 4 |
| Cyprus | × | × | • | • | • | • | • | GS | • | GS | • | • | • | • | • | • | • | • | • | 2 |
| Czech Republic | | | | | | | | | | | | | QF | • | • | • | 4th | 2nd | • | 3 (8) |
| Czechoslovakia | • | • | • | GS | GS | • | • | 1st | • | • | 3rd | GS | | | | | | | | 5 |
| Denmark | • | • | • | GS | GS | • | GS | GS | GS | GS | • | 2nd | • | • | • | QF | GS | GS | • | 10 |
| East Germany | • | • | 4th | 4th | GS | 3rd | 2nd | GS | | | | | | | | | | | | 6 |
| England | × | 3rd | • | • | • | • | • | • | • | • | GS | QF | QF | QF | • | • | QF | GS | 4th | 8 |
| Finland | 4th | • | • | • | • | GS | • | • | GS | GS | • | • | • | • | • | GS | GS | GS | GS | 8 |
| France | • | • | GS | GS | 3rd | GS | 3rd | GS | 4th | GS | 4th | • | 4th | 2nd | • | • | • | • | 2nd | 12 |
| Georgia | | | | | | | | | | | × | • | • | • | GS | • | • | • | • | 1 |
| Germany | | | | | | | | | 2nd | 1st | • | GS | 3rd | QF | 3rd | • | 3rd | QF | QF | 9 (15) |
| Greece | • | • | 2nd | GS | GS | • | GS | • | 3rd | • | GS | • | • | 4th | • | QF | GS | 4th | • | 10 |
| Hungary | • | • | GS | • | • | GS | • | GS | • | GS | QF | • | • | • | QF | • | GS | GS | GS | 9 |
| Iceland | • | • | GS | • | • | • | • | • | GS | • | GS | GS | • | • | GS | GS | • | • | • | 6 |
| Israel | | | | | GS | × | • | • | • | GS | • | • | • | 3rd | GS | QF | QF | GS | • | 7 |
| Italy | 1st | • | GS | 2nd | 1st* | • | GS | • | • | 3rd | 2nd | • | GS | • | GS | 2nd | • | • | QF | 11 |
| Liechtenstein | × | × | × | × | × | × | • | • | • | × | × | • | • | • | • | GS | × | • | • | 1 |
| Netherlands | • | • | GS | GS | • | • | GS | • | • | GS | • | • | • | • | • | • | • | 3rd | GS | 6 |
| Northern Ireland | × | × | × | • | GS | • | • | • | • | GS | GS | • | • | • | GS | • | • | • | • | 4 |
| Norway | • | • | GS | GS | GS | GS | GS | • | • | • | • | • | GS | • | • | GS | • | • | • | 7 |
| Poland | • | • | • | • | • | • | • | 3rd | GS | • | 1st | • | GS | GS | GS | • | 2nd | GS | GS | 9 |
| Portugal | • | • | GS | GS | GS | 2nd | 1st | 4th | GS | 4th | GS | QF | 1st | 1st | • | 4th | GS | 1st | • | 15 |
| Republic of Ireland | × | × | × | • | • | GS | • | • | • | GS | GS | GS | • | QF | • | 1st | • | GS | • | 7 |
| Romania | • | • | • | GS | • | GS | GS | • | GS | GS | • | • | • | GS | • | • | • | GS | GS | 8 |
| Russia | • | 2nd | 1st | 3rd | 2nd | • | GS | • | GS | • | GS | QF | • | • | • | GS | GS | QF | QF | 12 |
| Scotland | • | • | GS | GS | GS | • | GS | GS | • | GS | • | • | GS | • | • | GS | • | • | GS | 9 |
| Slovakia | | | | | | | | | | | | | GS | GS | QF | • | QF | QF | • | 5 |
| Slovenia | | | | | | | | | | | | • | GS | • | GS | • | • | • | • | 2 |
| Spain | • | • | 3rd | 1st | • | 1st | 4th | GS | 1st | 2nd | QF | GS | 2nd | GS | 1st | 3rd | 1st | QF | 1st | 16 |
| Sweden | • | • | GS | GS | • | GS | • | GS | GS | • | • | • | QF | • | • | GS | GS | • | • | 8 |
| Switzerland | • | • | • | • | • | GS | GS | • | GS | • | QF | GS | • | GS | 4th | • | GS | • | GS | 9 |
| Turkey | × | • | × | • | 4th | GS | • | GS | • | • | GS | 1st | GS | GS | QF | • | • | • | QF | 9 |
| Ukraine | | | | | | | | | | | × | 3rd | • | GS | GS | GS | • | • | • | 4 |
| West Germany | 2nd | 1st | GS | • | GS | 4th | • | GS | | | | | | | | | | | | 6 (15) |
| Yugoslavia | 3rd | 4th | GS | • | GS | GS | GS | 2nd | GS | GS | • | × | • | • | • | • | • | • | • | 9 |

=== 2002—present ===
| Nation | 2002 (16) | 2003 (8) | 2004 (8) | 2005 (8) | 2006 (8) | 2007 (8) | 2008 (8) | 2009 (8) | 2010 (8) | 2011 (8) | 2012 (8) | 2013 (8) | 2014 (8) | 2015 (16) | 2016 (16) | 2017 (16) | 2018 (16) | 2019 (16) | 2022 (16) | 2023 (16) | 2024 (16) | 2025 (8) | 2026 (8) | 2027 (8) | Total (+previous) |
|---|---|---|---|---|---|---|---|---|---|---|---|---|---|---|---|---|---|---|---|---|---|---|---|---|---|
| Albania | • | • | • | • | • | • | • | • | • | • | • | • | • | • | • | • | • | • | • | • | • | GS | • | | 1 (2) |
| Austria | • | 3rd | GS | • | • | • | • | • | • | • | • | GS | • | GS | QF | • | • | GS | • | • | QF | • | • | | 7 (14) |
| Azerbaijan | • | • | • | • | • | • | • | • | • | • | • | • | • | • | GS | • | • | • | • | • | • | • | • | • | 1 |
| Belarus | • | • | • | GS | • | • | • | • | • | • | • | • | • | • | • | • | • | • | • | • | • | • | • | | 1 (2) |
| Belgium | • | • | • | • | GS | SF | • | • | • | • | GS | • | • | SF | QF | • | SF | 6th | GS | • | • | SF | 2nd | | 10 (16) |
| Bosnia and Herzegovina | • | • | • | • | • | • | • | • | • | • | • | • | • | • | GS | GS | GS | • | • | • | • | • | • | | 3 |
| Bulgaria | • | • | • | • | • | • | • | • | • | • | • | • | • | GS | • | • | • | • | GS | • | • | • | • | • | 2 (7) |
| Croatia | • | • | • | 4th | • | • | • | • | • | • | • | GS | • | GS | • | GS | • | • | • | GS | GS | • | GS | | 6 (10) |
| Cyprus | • | • | • | • | • | • | • | • | • | • | • | • | • | • | • | • | • | • | • | • | GS | • | | 1 (3) | |
| Czech Republic | GS | • | • | • | 2nd | • | • | • | GS | GS | • | • | • | GS | • | • | • | QF | • | • | QF | GS | • | | 8 (16) |
| Denmark | QF | GS | • | • | • | • | • | • | • | SF | • | • | • | • | GS | • | GS | • | QF | • | SF | • | GS | | 7 (17) |
| England | 3rd | 4th | 4th | GS | • | 2nd | • | GS | 1st | SF | • | • | 1st | QF | QF | 2nd | SF | GS | • | 5th | QF | GS | • | | 17 (25) |
| Estonia | • | • | • | • | • | • | • | • | • | • | • | • | • | • | • | • | • | • | • | • | • | • | GS | • | 1 |
| Faroe Islands | • | • | • | • | • | • | • | • | • | • | • | • | • | • | • | GS | • | • | • | • | • | • | • | • | 1 |
| Finland | GS | • | • | • | • | • | • | • | • | • | • | • | • | • | • | • | • | • | • | • | • | • | • | | 1 (9) |
| France | 2nd | • | 1st | • | • | SF | 2nd | GS | SF | GS | GS | • | • | 1st | GS | 5th | • | SF | 1st | 2nd | GS | 2nd | SF | | 16 (28) |
| Georgia | QF | • | • | • | • | • | • | • | • | • | SF | • | • | • | • | • | • | • | • | • | • | • | • | | 2 (3) |
| Germany | QF | • | • | • | 4th | 5th | • | 1st | • | 2nd | 2nd | • | GS | 2nd | SF | SF | GS | GS | QF | 1st | • | GS | • | | 15 (30) |
| Greece | • | • | • | • | • | • | • | • | GS | • | • | • | • | GS | • | • | • | GS | • | • | • | • | • | • | 3 (13) |
| Hungary | GS | GS | • | • | GS | • | • | • | • | • | • | • | • | • | • | 6th | • | 5th | • | GS | • | • | • | • | 6 (15) |
| Iceland | • | • | • | • | • | GS | • | • | • | • | GS | • | • | • | • | • | • | GS | • | • | • | • | • | | 3 (9) |
| Israel | • | GS | • | GS | • | • | • | • | • | • | • | • | • | • | • | • | GS | • | GS | • | × | • | • | • | 4 (11) |
| Italy | • | GS | • | 3rd | • | • | • | SF | • | • | • | 2nd | • | QF | GS | GS | 2nd | 2nd | QF | GS | 1st | SF | 1st | | 13 (24) |
| Latvia | • | • | • | • | • | • | • | • | • | • | • | • | • | • | • | • | • | • | • | • | • | • | • | q | 1 |
| Liechtenstein | • | • | • | • | • | • | • | • | •• | • | • | • | • | • | • | • | • | • | • | • | • | • | • | • | 0 (1) |
| Luxembourg | • | • | • | • | GS | • | • | • | • | • | • | • | • | • | • | • | • | • | GS | • | • | • | • | • | 2 |
| Malta | • | • | • | • | • | • | • | • | • | • | • | • | GS | • | • | • | • | • | • | • | • | • | • | • | 1 |
| Moldova | GS | • | • | • | • | • | • | • | • | • | • | • | • | • | • | • | • | • | • | • | • | • | • | • | 1 |
| Montenegro | | | | | | | • | • | • | • | • | • | • | • | • | • | • | • | • | • | • | • | GS | • | 1 |
| Netherlands | GS | • | • | 2nd | • | 6th | SF | 2nd | • | 1st | 1st | • | 2nd | GS | SF | QF | 1st | 1st | 2nd | GS | • | • | • | • | 15 (21) |
| Northern Ireland | • | • | GS | • | • | • | • | • | • | • | • | • | • | • | • | • | • | • | • | • | • | • | • | • | 1 (5) |
| Norway | • | • | • | • | • | • | • | • | • | • | • | • | • | • | • | GS | QF | • | • | • | • | • | • | | 2 (9) |
| Poland | GS | • | • | • | • | • | • | • | • | • | SF | • | • | • | • | • | • | • | GS | SF | QF | • | • | | 5 (14) |
| Portugal | GS | 1st | 3rd | • | • | • | • | • | GS | • | • | • | SF | • | 1st | • | GS | QF | SF | GS | 2nd | 1st | • | | 12 (27) |
| Republic of Ireland | • | • | • | • | • | • | GS | • | • | • | • | • | • | GS | • | QF | QF | GS | • | QF | • | • | • | • | 6 (13) |
| Romania | • | • | • | • | • | • | • | • | • | GS | • | • | • | • | • | • | • | • | • | • | • | • | • | | 1 (9) |
| Russia | • | • | • | • | 1st | • | • | • | • | • | • | 1st | • | SF | • | • | • | GS | × | × | × | × | × | × | 4 (16) |
| Scotland | • | • | • | • | • | • | GS | • | • | • | • | • | SF | GS | GS | GS | • | • | GS | GS | • | • | • | • | 7 (16) |
| Serbia | | | | | | • | GS | • | • | GS | • | • | • | • | GS | GS | GS | • | SF | QF | SF | • | • | | 8 (19) |
| Serbia and Montenegro | QF | • | • | • | GS | | | | | | | | | | | | | | | | | | | | 2 (11) |
| Slovakia | • | • | • | • | • | • | • | • | • | • | • | SF | • | • | • | • | • | • | • | • | GS | • | • | | 2 (7) |
| Slovenia | • | • | • | • | • | • | • | • | • | • | GS | • | • | GS | • | • | GS | • | • | GS | • | • | • | • | 4 (6) |
| Spain | 4th | 2nd | 2nd | • | 3rd | 1st | 1st | GS | 2nd | • | • | • | • | QF | 2nd | 1st | QF | SF | QF | SF | GS | • | SF | | 17 (33) |
| Sweden | • | • | • | • | • | • | • | • | • | • | • | SF | • | • | QF | • | QF | GS | GS | • | GS | • | • | • | 6 (14) |
| Switzerland | 1st | • | • | GS | • | • | GS | SF | GS | • | • | GS | GS | • | • | • | GS | • | • | 6th | • | • | • | | 9 (18) |
| Turkey | • | • | GS | 1st | • | • | SF | GS | SF | • | • | • | GS | • | • | SF | • | • | GS | • | • | • | • | | 8 (17) |
| Ukraine | GS | • | GS | • | • | GS | • | • | • | • | • | GS | • | • | GS | GS | • | • | • | • | GS | • | • | • | 7 (11) |
| Wales | • | • | • | • | • | • | • | • | • | • | • | • | • | • | • | • | • | • | • | GS | GS | • | • | | 2 |

== Men's U-17 World Cup qualifiers ==
Legend

- 1st – Champions
- 2nd – Runners-up
- 3rd – Third place
- 4th – Fourth place
- QF – Quarterfinals
- R3 – Round 3
- R2 – Round 2
- R1 – Round 1
- – Hosts
- – Not affiliated to UEFA
- q – Qualified for upcoming tournament

| Team | (China) 1985 | (Canada) 1987 | (Scotland) 1989 | (Italy) 1991 | (Japan) 1993 | (Ecuador) 1995 | (Egypt) 1997 | (New Zealand) 1999 | (Trinidad and Tobago) 2001 | (Finland) 2003 | (Peru) 2005 | (South Korea) 2007 | (Nigeria) 2009 | (Mexico) 2011 | (United Arab Emirates) 2013 | (Chile) 2015 | (India) 2017 | (Brazil) 2019 | (Indonesia) 2023 | (Qatar) 2025 | (Qatar) 2026 | Total |
|---|---|---|---|---|---|---|---|---|---|---|---|---|---|---|---|---|---|---|---|---|---|---|
| Austria | | | | | | | R1 | | | | | | | | R1 | | | | | 2nd | | 3 |
| Belgium | | | | | | | | | | | | R1 | | | | 3rd | | | | R2 | q | 4 |
| Croatia | Part of Yugoslavia | | | | | | | | R1 | | | | | | R1 | QF | | | | R2 | q | 5 |
| Czech Republic | | | | | QF | | | | | | | | | R1 | | | | | | R2 | | 3 |
| Denmark | | | | | | | | | | | | | | R1 | | | | | | | q | 2 |
| East Germany | | | QF | | Reunified with West Germany | | | | | | | | | | | | | | | | | 1 |
| England | | | | | | | | | | | | QF | | QF | | R1 | 1st | | R2 | R3 | | 6 |
| Finland | | | | | | | | | | R1 | | | | | | | | | | | | 1 |
| France | | QF | | | | | | | 1st | | | QF | | QF | | R1 | R2 | 3rd | 2nd | R3 | q | 10 |
| Germany | 2nd | | | QF | | R1 | 4th | R1 | | | | 3rd | R2 | 3rd | | R2 | QF | | 1st | R2 | | 12 |
| Greece | | | | | | | | | | | | | | | | | | | | | q | 1 |
| Hungary | QF | | | | | | | | | | | | | | | | | R1 | | | | 2 |
| Italy | R1 | 4th | | R1 | R1 | | | | | | R1 | | QF | | R2 | | | QF | | 3rd | q | 10 |
| Netherlands | | | | | | | | | | | 3rd | | R1 | R1 | | | | 4th | | | | 4 |
| Montenegro | | | | | | | | | | | | | | | | | | | | | q | 1 |
| Poland | | | | | 4th | | | R1 | | | | | | | | | | | R1 | | | 3 |
| Portugal | | | 3rd | | | QF | | | | QF | | | | | | | | | | 1st | | 4 |
| Republic of Ireland | | | | | | | | | | | | | | | | | | | | R3 | q | 2 |
| Romania | | | | | | | | | | | | | | | | | | | | | q | 1 |
| Russia | | 1st | | | | | | | | | | | | | R2 | R2 | | | | | | 3 |
| Scotland | | | 2nd | | | | | | | | | | | | | | | | | | | 1 |
| Serbia | | | | | | | | | | | | | | | | | | | | | q | 1 |
| Slovakia | | | | | QF | | | | | | | | | | R1 | | | | | | | 1 |
| Spain | | | | 2nd | | R1 | 3rd | R1 | R1 | 2nd | | 2nd | 3rd | | | | 2nd | QF | QF | | q | 12 |
| Sweden | | | | | | | | | | | | | | | 3rd | | | | | | | 1 |
| Switzerland | | | | | | | | | | | | | 1st | | | | | | | QF | | 2 |
| Turkey | | | | | | | | | | | 4th | | QF | | | | R1 | | | | | 3 |

In 2023, the German U-17 became the first UEFA team in this age group to become European and world champions with the same cohort.

== Awards ==
=== Player of the Tournament ===
For certain tournaments, the official website UEFA.com subsequently named a Golden Player or Player of the Tournament.

U-16 Championship

| Tournament | Player |
|---|---|
| 2001 England | (Spain) Fernando Torres |

U-17 Championship

| Tournament | Player |
|---|---|
| 2002 Denmark | (England) Wayne Rooney |
| 2003 Portugal | (Portugal) Miguel Veloso |
| 2004 France | (Spain) Cesc Fàbregas |
| 2005 Italy | (Turkey) Nuri Şahin |
| 2006 Luxembourg | (Germany) Toni Kroos |
| 2007 Belgium | (Spain) Bojan Krkić |
| 2008 Turkey | (Serbia) Danijel Aleksić |
| 2009 Germany | (Germany) Mario Götze |
| 2010 Liechtenstein | (England) Connor Wickham |
| 2011 Serbia | (Netherlands) Kyle Ebecilio |
| 2012 Slovenia | (Germany) Max Meyer |
| 2013 Slovakia | (Russia) Anton Mitryushkin |
| 2014 Malta | (Netherlands) Steven Bergwijn |
| 2015 Bulgaria | (France) Odsonne Édouard |
| 2016 Azerbaijan | (Portugal) José Gomes |
| 2017 Croatia | (England) Jadon Sancho |
| 2018 England | - |
| 2019 Republic of Ireland | - |
| 2022 Israel | - |
| 2023 Hungary | (Germany) Paris Brunner |
| 2024 Cyprus | (Italy) Francesco Camarda |
| 2025 Albania | (Portugal) Rafael Quintas |
| 2026 Estonia | (Spain) Ebrima Tunkara |

=== Top scorer ===
The Top scorer award is awarded to the player who scores the most goals during the tournament.

U-16 Championship

| Tournament | Player | Goals |
|---|---|---|
| 2000 Israel | (Czech Republic) Tomas Jun | 6 |
| 2001 England | (Spain) Fernando Torres | 7 |

U-17 Championship

| Tournament | Player | Goals |
|---|---|---|
| 2002 Denmark | (Spain) Jonathan Soriano | 7 |
| 2003 Portugal | (Spain) David Rodríguez | 6 |
| 2004 France | (France) Hatem Ben Arfa (Portugal) Bruno Gama (England) Shane Paul (Spain) Marc Pedraza | 3 |
| 2005 Italy | (Turkey) Tevfik Köse | 6 |
| 2006 Luxembourg | (Germany) Manuel Fischer (Spain) Bojan Krkić (Czech Republic) Tomáš Necid | 5 |
| 2007 Belgium | (Germany) Toni Kroos (England) Victor Moses | 3 |
| 2008 Turkey | (France) Yannis Tafer | 4 |
| 2009 Germany | (Germany) Lennart Thy (Netherlands) Luc Castaignos | 3 |
| 2010 Liechtenstein | (Spain) Paco Alcácer | 6 |
| 2011 Serbia | (Netherlands) Kyle Ebecilio (England) Hallam Hope (Netherlands) Tonny Vilhena (Germany) Samed Yeşil | 3 |
| 2012 Slovenia | (Germany) Max Meyer | 3 |
| 2013 Slovakia | (Slovenia) Martin Slaninka (Switzerland) Robin Kamber | 2 |
| 2014 Malta | (England) Dominic Solanke (Netherlands) Jari Schuurman | 4 |
| 2015 Bulgaria | (France) Odsonne Édouard | 8 |
| 2016 Azerbaijan | (Portugal) José Gomes | 7 |
| 2017 Croatia | (France) Amine Gouiri | 8 |
| 2018 England | (Belgium) Yorbe Vertessen (Italy) Edoardo Vergani | 4 |
| 2019 Republic of Ireland | (France) Adil Aouchiche | 9 |
| 2022 Israel | (Serbia) Jovan Milošević | 5 |
| 2023 Hungary | (Germany) Paris Brunner (Spain) Marc Guiu (Germany) Robert Ramsak (Spain) Lamine Yamal | 4 |
| 2024 Cyprus | (Portugal) Rodrigo Mora | 5 |
| 2025 Albania | (Italy) Samuele Inácio | 5 |
| 2026 Estonia | (Croatia) Jakov Dedić | 3 |

== See also ==
- UEFA European Championship
- UEFA European Under-21 Championship
- UEFA European Under-19 Championship
