= Portugal national under-16 football team =

National association football team

The Portugal national under-16 football team is the association football team that represents the nation of Portugal at the under-16 level.

== Current squad ==
The following players were named in the squad for the September/October 2025 international activities, including preparatory matches and the Federations Cup in Turkey. Caps and goals are correct as of the 2025–2026 international cycle.

No.	Pos.	Player	Date of birth (age)	Caps	Goals	Club
	GK	António Luís	16	0	0	(Portuguese Football Federation) Benfica
	GK	Guilherme Sousa Pinto	15	0	0	(Portuguese Football Federation) Sporting CP
	DF	Tomás Ferreira	16	0	0	(Portuguese Football Federation) Benfica
	DF	Vasco Dinis	16	0	0	(Portuguese Football Federation) Sporting CP
	DF	Martim Gonçalves	16	0	0	(Portuguese Football Federation) Porto
	DF	João Rijo	16	0	0	(Portuguese Football Federation) Sporting CP
	DF	Rodrigo Valente	16	0	0	(Portuguese Football Federation) Braga
	DF	Isaac Silva	15	0	0	(The Football Association) Chelsea U18
	MF	João Morais	16	0	0	(Portuguese Football Federation) Braga
	MF	Francisco Simões	16	0	0	(Portuguese Football Federation) Benfica
	MF	Martim Almeida	16	0	0	(Portuguese Football Federation) Sporting CP
	MF	Gonçalo Fontes	16	0	0	(Portuguese Football Federation) Porto
	MF	Henrique Maduro	16	0	0	(Portuguese Football Federation) Porto
	FW	Gustavo Guerra	16	0	0	(Portuguese Football Federation) Benfica
	FW	Gustavo Fonte	16	0	0	(Portuguese Football Federation) Porto
	FW	Afonso Ferreirinha	16	0	0	(Portuguese Football Federation) Sporting CP
	FW	Tiago Rodrigues	16	0	0	(Portuguese Football Federation) Benfica
	FW	Cristiano Ronaldo Jr.	16	0	0	(Saudi Arabian Football Federation) Al Nassr
	FW	Abdu Cassamá	16	0	0	(Portuguese Football Federation) Porto
	FW	Gonçalo Santos	16	0	0	(Portuguese Football Federation) Porto

== Competitive record ==
=== FIFA U-16 World Championship ===
Portugal have qualified for one FIFA U-16 World Championship with their performance being a third place finish in the 1989 FIFA U-16 World Championship.

FIFA U-16 World Championship record
Year	Result	Position	Pld	W	D*	L	GF	GA	GD
1985–1987	Did not qualify								
(Scotland) 1989	Third place	3rd	6	3	2	1	11	7	+4
Total	Third place	1/3	6	3	2	1	11	7	+4

=== UEFA European U-16 Championship ===
UEFA European Under-16 Championship record
Year	Result	Position	Pld	W	D*	L	GF	GA	GD
1982–1984	Did not qualify								
(Hungary) 1985	First stage	15th	3	0	1	2	1	5	–4
(Greece) 1986	First stage	9th	3	1	1	1	4	5	–1
(France) 1987	First stage	5th	3	2	0	1	5	3	+2
(Spain) 1988	Runners-up	2nd	5	3	2	0	6	0	+6
(Denmark) 1989	Champions	1st	5	5	0	0	15	2	+13
(Germany) 1990	Fourth place	4th	5	2	2	1	9	7	+2
(Switzerland) 1991	First stage	5th	3	2	1	0	4	1	+3
(Cyprus) 1992	Fourth place	4th	5	2	1	2	5	6	–1
(Turkey) 1993	Group stage	13th	3	0	1	2	3	6	–3
(Republic of Ireland) 1994	Quarter-finals	6th	4	2	1	1	5	1	+4
(Belgium) 1995	Champions	1st	6	5	0	1	14	5	+11
(Austria) 1996	Champions	1st	6	5	1	0	16	3	+13
(Germany) 1997	Did not qualify								
(Scotland) 1998	Fourth place	4th	6	3	1	2	9	7	+2
(Czech Republic) 1999	Quarter-finals	6th	4	2	1	1	8	7	+1
(Israel) 2000	Champions	1st	6	4	1	1	9	6	+3
(England) 2001	Did not qualify								
Total	4 titles	15/19	67	38	14	15	113	64	+49

== Honours ==
- UEFA U-16 Championship

Champions (4): 1989, 1995, 1996, 2000
Runners-up (1): 1988

- Montaigu Tournament

Champions (4): 2010, 2012, 2017, 2018
Runners-up (2): 1993, 1994
