= Scotland national under-16 football team =

National U-16 association football team

Scotland Under-16
- Association: Scottish Football Association
- Head coach: James Grady
First colours	Second colours

World Cup
- Appearances: 1
- Best result: Runner-up (1989)

European Under-16 Championship
- Appearances: 9 (first in 1985)
- Best result: First stage (9 occasions)
Medal record
FIFA U-16 World Cup
Silver medal – second place	1989 Scotland

The Scotland national under-16 football team represents Scotland in international football at the under-16 age level. It is controlled by the Scottish Football Association, the governing body for football in Scotland.

== Competitive record ==
=== FIFA U-16 World Championship record ===
For results since 1991, see Scotland national under-17 football team.

The Scotland under-16s' best tournament performance was as runners up in the 1989 FIFA U-16 World Championship under manager Craig Brown. Despite leading Saudi Arabia 2–0 in the final after goals from Ian Downie and Paul Dickov, the match finished 2–2 after extra time. Scotland lost the subsequent penalty shoot-out in front of over 50,000 fans at Hampden Park in Glasgow. Some media commentators reported suspicions, which were shared by Craig Brown and former Scottish Football Association secretary Ernie Walker, that Saudi Arabia had fielded ineligible over-age players in the competition.

Year	Round	GP	W	D	L	GS	GA
(China) 1985	did not qualify	-	-	-	-	-	-
(Canada) 1987	did not qualify	-	-	-	-	-	-
(Scotland) 1989	Runners-up	6	3	2	1	8	3
Total	1/3	6	3	2	1	8	3

=== UEFA European U-16 Championship record ===
For results since 2002, see Scotland national under-17 football team.

Year	Round	GP	W	D	L	GS	GA
(Italy) 1982	Qualifying stage (quarter finals)	4	2	0	2	8	6
(West Germany) 1984	Qualifying stage	4	1	1	2	4	9
(Hungary) 1985	First stage	3	1	0	2	3	5
(Greece) 1986	First stage	3	2	0	1	6	2
(France) 1987	First stage	3	0	2	1	4	6
(Spain) 1988	Qualifying stage	2	0	1	1	1	2
(Denmark) 1989	First stage	3	0	2	1	4	5
(East Germany) 1990	First stage	3	0	1	2	2	9
(Switzerland) 1991	Qualifying stage	-	-	-	-	-	-
(Cyprus) 1992	First stage	3	2	0	1	6	2
(Turkey) 1993	Qualifying stage	-	-	-	-	-	-
(Republic of Ireland) 1994	Qualifying stage	-	-	-	-	-	-
(Belgium) 1995	First stage	3	0	1	2	3	6
(Austria) 1996	Qualifying stage	-	-	-	-	-	-
(Germany) 1997	Qualifying stage	-	-	-	-	-	-
(Scotland) 1998	First stage	3	0	2	1	1	3
(Czech Republic) 1999	Qualifying stage	2	1	0	1	3	2
(Israel) 2000	Qualifying stage	-	-	-	-	-	-
(England) 2001	First stage	3	1	0	2	3	5
Total	9/19	27	6	8	13	32	43

=== Victory Shield ===
The Scotland under-16s compete in the Victory Shield tournament, which is contested annually. The competition is currently sponsored by Sky Sports. Scotland have won the Victory Shield outright on 17 occasions, most recently in 2013, and were joint champions on a further 10 occasions, most recently in 2003.

In the 2011 competition, which took place in March, Scotland finished as runners up to England, losing 2–1. They had only needed a draw to win the tournament.

=== Nordic Cup ===
The Scotland under-16s also play in an occasional Nordic Cup competition with the under-16 teams of Scandinavian countries such as Norway, Sweden and Iceland. The 2010 tournament also featured the under-16 sides of Finland, Faeroe Islands, Denmark and England.

=== Other Tournaments ===
Year	Competition	Result	GP	W	D*	L	GS	GA	Ref
(Italy) 1979	Torneo Citta di Udine	Runners up	Full results unknown						
(England) 1980	Dentyne Trophy	Winners	1	1	0	0	5	4	
(Portugal) 1995	Algarve Tournament	Runners up	3	1	1	1	7	3	
(Malta) 1999	Malta Tournament	Winners	2	1	1	0	4	2	
(Northern Ireland) 2000	Ballymena Tournament	Fifth Place	Full results unknown						
(Northern Ireland) 2002	Ballymena Tournament	Sixth Place	Full results unknown						
(Northern Ireland) 2003	Ballymena Tournament	Winners	4	3	1	0	6	3	
(Switzerland) 2003	Three Nations Tournament	Runners up	2	1	0	1	1	3	
(Northern Ireland) 2004	Ballymena Tournament	Third Place	4	2	1	1	8	4	
(Northern Ireland) 2005	Ballymena Tournament	Third Place	4	3	0	1	7	4	
(Turkey) 2006	Aegean Cup	Eighth Place	3	0	0	3	2	12	
(Northern Ireland) 2006	Ballymena Tournament	Seventh Place	4	0	1	3	0	7	
(Northern Ireland) 2007	Ballymena Tournament	Fifth Place	4	1	3	0	5	3	
(Russia) 2012	Star Way Tournament	Third Place	4	3	0	1	4	2	
(Russia) 2013	Star Way Tournament	Fifth Place	4	2	1	1	6	5	
(Turkey) 2014	Aegean Cup	Seventh Place	3	0	2	1	2	5	
2014	Friendly Tournament	Fourth Place	3	0	0	3	0	6	
(Scotland) 2017	Oriam Tournament	Winners	3	3	0	0	11	0	

== Friendly matches ==
In recent years, Scotland have played a two-leg international friendly match against an under-18 side picked by the football association of Jersey. The matches are used as a warm-up for competitive fixtures and have often taken place in Springfield Stadium in Jersey's Springfield Park. Despite the age gap and Jersey's home advantage, Scotland have won convincingly in some of these matches. In other friendlies since 2008, Scotland have faced the under-16 teams of Malta, Kazakhstan, Guernsey Portugal and Spain.

== Players ==
=== Current squad ===
- The following players were called up for the 2019 Victory Shield tournament.

No.	Pos.	Player	Date of birth (age)	Caps	Goals	Club
		Josh Adam				(Scottish Football Association) Celtic
		Matthew Anderson				(Scottish Football Association) Celtic
		Ben Andreucci				(The Football Association) Leeds United
		Adedire Awokoya-Mebude				(Scottish Football Association) Rangers
		Adam Brooks				(Scottish Football Association) Celtic
		Ben Doak				(Scottish Football Association) Celtic
		Ryan Duncan				(Scottish Football Association) Aberdeen
		Harley Ewen				(Scottish Football Association) Rangers
		Kelsey Ewen				(Scottish Football Association) Rangers
		Callum Flatman				(Scottish Football Association) Heart of Midlothian
		Murray Johnson				(Scottish Football Association) Hibernian
		Tsoanelo Letsosa				(Scottish Football Association) Celtic
		Jack McConnell				(Scottish Football Association) Rangers
		Ben McPherson				(Scottish Football Association) Celtic
		Kristi Montgomery				(The Football Association) Blackburn Rovers
		Jeremiah Mullen				(The Football Association) Liverpool
		Kieran Offord				(Scottish Football Association) St Mirren
		Dylan Reid				(Scottish Football Association) St Mirren
		William Wandji				(The Football Association) Middlesbrough
		Finn Yeats				(Scottish Football Association) Aberdeen

== See also ==
- Football in Scotland
- Scotland national youth football team
