= Switzerland national under-16 football team =

National under-16 football team of Switzerland

The Switzerland national under-16 football team is the national under-16 football team of Switzerland, which is controlled by the Swiss Football Association.

== History ==
The team acted as the feeder team of Switzerland national under-17 football team, thus only participating in friendlies tournament.

Relationship with U15

The team that bear U15 title only re-birthed in 2007, however the old U16 team was equivalent to the current U17, thus the old feeder U15 team was only renamed to U16 since 2001. The team born in 2007 was a new policy to commence the U16 season earlier (in second half of previous season), thus equivalent to old U14. The U15 team was active in 2007 when U17 failed to qualify to final tournament, thus U16 team de facto became U17 and new member for U16 team was selected but credited as U15.

The U17 qualified from 2008 to 2010, thus U16 team was not equal to U15 team in that period, the de facto first year of commencing U15. The U17 did not qualify again in 2011. In 2011–12 season the U15 team carried the fixture paralleled to 2012 UEFA European Under-17 Football Championship elite round, again U15 commencing disregarding the commencing of U16. In 2012–13 season the U15 team had fixture in the first half of the season for the first team in 2000s, on 18 September 2012, to formalization the youth ranks compose of U15 to U21.

== Swiss national teams ==
- Switzerland national football team
- Switzerland national under-23 football team (also known as Swiss Olympic)
- Switzerland national under-21 football team
- Switzerland national under-20 football team
- Switzerland national under-19 football team
- Switzerland national under-18 football team
- Switzerland national under-17 football team
