= Soviet Union national under-16 football team =

Youth football team representing the Soviet Union

Soviet Union U-16/17
- Nickname: Juniors (Юниоры)
- Association: Football Federation of the Soviet Union
- Confederation: UEFA (Europe)
- Head coach: -
- FIFA code: URS
First colours	Second colours

FIFA U-17 World Cup
- Appearances: 1 (first in 1987)
- Best result: Winners, 1987

UEFA European Under-16 Football Championship
- Appearances: 6 (first in 1984)
- Best result: Winners, 1985

The Soviet national junior football team was the under-16 (continental competitions) and under-17 (world competitions) football team of the Soviet Union. It ceased to exist as a result of the breakup of the Union.

Following the realignment of UEFA's youth competitions in 1982, the Soviet Union under-16 team was formed. The competition has been held since 1982. From 1982 to 2001 it was an Under-16 event. The team had a good record, winning the competition once, reaching the final twice, but failing to qualify for the last six on 10 occasions.

The team has participated in FIFA U-16 World Championship only once – in 1987 – after being qualified from European Under-16 championship as a runner-up. The Soviet Union won it in a final game against Nigeria by penalties. The team gained the Fair Play award. Yuriy Nikiforov scored 5 goals on the tournament but FIFA awarded the Golden Boot to Moussa Traoré because Côte d'Ivoire had scored fewer goals than the Soviet Union.

After the dissolution of the Soviet Union (on December 26, 1991), the senior team played out its remaining fixtures, which were the finals of Euro 92. Because the Soviet Union under-16s had, by December 26, already failed to qualify for their version of the 1992 European Championship, the former Soviet states didn't play as a combined team at U-17 level ever again.

Of the former Soviet states, only Russia entered the 1992–1993 competition.

== UEFA U-16 Championship record ==
- 1982: Did not qualify. Lost quarter-finalists.
- 1984: Runners-up.
- 1985: Winners.
- 1986: 3rd place.
- 1987: Runners-up.
- 1988: Did not qualify. Finished 2nd of 2 in qualification group.
- 1989: Group stage. Finished 2nd in group D.
- 1990: Did not qualify. Finished 2nd of 2 in qualification group.
- 1991: Group stage. Finished 2nd in group D.
- 1992: Did not qualify. Finished 2nd of 2 in qualification group as CIS.

== Head-to-head record ==
The following table shows Soviet Union's head-to-head record in the FIFA U-17 World Cup.

Opponent	Pld	W	D	L	GF	GA	GD	Win %
Bolivia	1	1	0	0	4	2	+2	100.00
France	1	1	0	0	3	2	+1	100.00
Ivory Coast	1	1	0	0	5	1	+4	100.00
Mexico	1	1	0	0	7	0	+7	100.00
Nigeria	2	0	2	0	2	2	+0	0.00
Total	6	4	2	0	21	7	+14	66.67

== See also ==
- Soviet Union national football team
- Soviet Union national under-20 football team
- Soviet Union national under-18 football team
- UEFA European Under-17 Football Championship
