= 1984 UEFA European Under-16 Championship =

U-16-Fußball-Europameisterschaft 1984

Tournament details
- Host country: West Germany
- Dates: 3–5 May
- Teams: 4 (from 1 confederation)
- Venues: 4 (in 4 host cities)

Final positions
- Champions: West Germany (1st title)
- Runners-up: Soviet Union
- Third place: England
- Fourth place: Yugoslavia

Tournament statistics
- Matches played: 4
- Goals scored: 11 (2.75 per match)

The 1984 UEFA European Under-16 Championship was the 2nd edition of the UEFA's European Under-16 Football Championship. West Germany hosted the championship, during 3–5 May 1984. Four teams contested after playing one qualifying stage and quarterfinals.

West Germany won the final against Soviet Union.

== Qualifying ==
The final tournament of the 1984 UEFA European Under-16 Championship was preceded by two qualification stages: a qualifying round and quarterfinals. During these rounds, 27 national teams competed to determine the four teams that played the tournament.

== Participants ==
- England (first appearance)
- Soviet Union (first appearance)
- West Germany (second appearance)
- Yugoslavia (second appearance)

== Results ==
Semi-finals
3 May – Heilbronn
West Germany	5
Yugoslavia	1
3 May – Ludwigsburg
Soviet Union	2
England	0

Final
5 May – Böblingen
West Germany	2
Soviet Union	0
Third place
5 May – Ulm
England	1
Yugoslavia	0

=== Semi-finals ===
3 May 1984

West Germany	5–1	Yugoslavia

Heilbronn

3 May 1984

Soviet Union	2–0	England

Ludwigsburg

=== Third place match ===
5 May 1984

England	1–0	Yugoslavia

Böblingen

=== Final ===
5 May 1984

West Germany	2–0	Soviet Union
Simmes; Janßen

Ulm
Referee: (Hungary) Lajos Nemeth
