= 1982 UEFA European Under-16 Championship =

Campionato di calcio europeo Under-16 1982

Tournament details
- Host country: Italy
- Dates: 5–7 May
- Teams: 4 (from 1 confederation)
- Venues: 2 (in 2 host cities)

Final positions
- Champions: Italy (1st title)
- Runners-up: West Germany
- Third place: Yugoslavia
- Fourth place: Finland

Tournament statistics
- Matches played: 4
- Goals scored: 6 (1.5 per match)

The 1982 UEFA European Under-16 Championship was the first UEFA European Under-17 Championship. Italy was the host of the championship. The tournament took place from 5 to 7 May 1982. Four teams entered the competition, after playing one qualifying stage and quarterfinals.

Italy won the final against West Germany.

== Qualifying ==
The final tournament of the 1982 UEFA European Under-16 Championship was preceded by two qualification stages: a qualifying round and quarterfinals. During these rounds, 26 national teams competed to determine the four teams that played the tournament.

== Participants ==
- Finland
- Italy
- West Germany
- Yugoslavia

== Results ==
Semi-finals
5 May – Falconara
Italy	1 (4)
Finland	1 (2)
5 May – Senigallia
West Germany	2
Yugoslavia	1

Final
7 May – Falconara
Italy	1
West Germany	0
Third place
7 May – Falconara
Yugoslavia	0 (4)
Finland	0 (2)

=== Semi-finals ===
5 May 1982

Italy	1–1	Finland
		Ismo Lius
Penalties
	4–2

Stadio Roccheggiani, Falconara Marittima

5 May 1982

West Germany	2–1	Yugoslavia
		Cvijan Milošević

Stadio Goffredo Bianchelli, Senigallia

=== Third place match ===
7 May 1982

Yugoslavia	0–0	Finland
Penalties
	4–2

Stadio Roccheggiani, Falconara Marittima

=== Final ===
7 May 1982

Italy	1–0	West Germany
Marco Macina 87'

Stadio Roccheggiani, Falconara Marittima
Referee: (Switzerland) Ulrich Nyffenegger
