= 1990 UEFA European Under-16 Championship squads =

Football tournament squads

== Group A ==
=== Denmark ===
Head coach:

=== Northern Ireland ===
Head coach:

=== Portugal ===
Head coach: Carlos Queiroz

No.	Pos.	Player	Date of birth (age)	Caps	Goals	Club
1	GK	Pedro Jesus	29 June 1974 (aged 15)			(Portuguese Football Federation) Porto
2	MF	Nuno Santos	19 November 1974 (aged 15)			(Portuguese Football Federation) Belenenses
3	DF	Kenedy	18 February 1974 (aged 16)			(Portuguese Football Federation) Benfica
4	MF	Porfírio	28 September 1973 (aged 16)			(Portuguese Football Federation) Sporting
5	DF	Hugo Costa	4 November 1973 (aged 16)			(Portuguese Football Federation) Benfica
6	DF	Alex	4 September 1973 (aged 16)			(Portuguese Football Federation) Benfica
7	MF	Poejo	30 September 1973 (aged 16)			(Portuguese Football Federation) Sporting
8	DF	Hernâni	26 November 1973 (aged 16)			(Portuguese Football Federation) Benfica
9	MF	Edgar	25 December 1973 (aged 16)			(Portuguese Football Federation) Sporting
10	DF	Alexandre Ribeiro	9 March 1974 (aged 16)			(Portuguese Football Federation) Porto
11	DF	Litos	25 February 1974 (aged 16)			(Portuguese Football Federation) Boavista
12	GK	Costinha	22 September 1973 (aged 16)			(Portuguese Football Federation) Boavista
13	MF	Costa	18 November 1973 (aged 16)			(Portuguese Football Federation) Porto
14	MF	Tenreiro	25 August 1973 (aged 16)			(Portuguese Football Federation) Porto
15	DF	Sérgio Ribeiro	11 January 1974 (aged 16)			(Portuguese Football Federation) Boavista
16	DF	Nuno Afonso	6 October 1974 (aged 15)			(Portuguese Football Federation) Benfica

=== Turkey ===
Head coach:

== Group B ==
=== Cyprus ===
Head coach:

=== Hungary ===
Head coach:

=== Poland ===
Head coach:Wiktor Stasiuk

No.	Pos.	Player	Date of birth (age)	Caps	Goals	Club
1	GK	Arkadiusz Onyszko	12 January 1974 (aged 16)			(Polish Football Association) Lublinianka Lublin
2	DF	Artur Ficoń	23 February 1974 (aged 16)			(Polish Football Association) Górnik Zabrze
3	DF	Krzysztof Ratajczyk	9 November 1973 (aged 16)			(Polish Football Association) Warta Poznań
4	DF	Grzegorz Podeszwa	8 July 1974 (aged 15)			(Polish Football Association) Górnik Zabrze
5	DF	Tomasz Sangowski	23 September 1973 (aged 16)			(Polish Football Association) Lech Poznań
6	MF	Jacek Chańko	25 January 1974 (aged 16)			(Polish Football Association) Jagiellonia Białystok
7	MF	Krzysztof Przała	29 January 1974 (aged 16)			(Polish Football Association) Dalin Myślenice
8	MF	Michał Biskup	10 April 1974 (aged 16)			(Polish Football Association) Bałtyk Gdynia
9	FW	Piotr Apryjas	4 August 1973 (aged 16)			(Polish Football Association) Cracovia Kraków
10	MF	Sławomir Wojciechowski	6 September 1973 (aged 16)			(Polish Football Association) Lechia Gdańsk
11	FW	Andrzej Sazonowicz	22 August 1973 (aged 16)			(Polish Football Association) Gwardia Białystok
12	GK	Jarosław Talik	29 August 1973 (aged 16)			(Polish Football Association) Olimpia Elbląg
13	MF	Robert Michalak	9 January 1974 (aged 16)			(Polish Football Association) Olimpia Poznań
14	MF	Grzegorz Łukasik	11 August 1973 (aged 16)			(Polish Football Association) Olimpia Elbląg
15	FW	Grzegorz Poleszak	18 July 1974 (aged 15)			(Polish Football Association) Lublinianka Lublin
16	FW	Paweł Krzeszowiak	12 April 1974 (aged 16)			(Polish Football Association) Górnik Zabrze

=== Sweden ===
Head coach:

== Group C ==
=== Czechoslovakia ===
Head coach:

No.	Pos.	Player	Date of birth (age)	Caps	Goals	Club
	GK	Miroslav Hýll	30 September 1973 (aged 16)			(Football Association of the Czech Republic) ZVL Žilin
	DF	Zdeněk Cieslar	13 December 1973 (aged 16)			(Football Association of the Czech Republic) Vítkovice
	DF	Oldřich David				
	DF	Michal Kovář	8 September 1973 (aged 16)			(Football Association of the Czech Republic) Sigma Olomouc
	DF	Tomáš Řepka	2 January 1974 (aged 16)			(Football Association of the Czech Republic) Svit Zlín
	DF	Radim Šulek				(Football Association of the Czech Republic) Slavia Prague
	DF	Patrik Berger	10 November 1973 (aged 16)			(Football Association of the Czech Republic) Sparta Prague
	MF	Martin Čížek	9 June 1974 (aged 15)			(Football Association of the Czech Republic) Baník Ostrava
	MF	Martin Roub	17 November 1973 (aged 16)			(Football Association of the Czech Republic) Škoda Plzeň
	MF	Marek Vomáčka	3 October 1973 (aged 16)			(Football Association of the Czech Republic) Sparta Prague
	MF	Tomáš Votava	21 February 1974 (aged 16)			(Football Association of the Czech Republic) Sparta Prague
	FW	Maroš Matějka	3 January 1974 (aged 16)			(Football Association of the Czech Republic) Dukla Banská Bystrica
	FW	Marek Penksa	4 August 1973 (aged 16)			(Football Association of the Czech Republic) Dukla Banská Bystrica
	FW	Petr Peškar				
	FW	Gabriel Ungvölgyi	14 August 1973 (aged 16)			(Football Association of the Czech Republic) Jednota Košice

=== West Germany ===
Head coach:Bernd Stöber

No.	Pos.	Player	Date of birth (age)	Caps	Goals	Club
	GK	Uwe Gospodarek	6 August 1973 (aged 16)			(German Football Association) FC Bayern München
	GK	Dimo Wache	1 November 1973 (aged 16)			(German Football Association) VfB Oldenburg
	DF	Maik Jekabsons	12 July 1974 (aged 15)			(German Football Association) Eutin 08
	DF	Guido Jörres	7 March 1974 (aged 16)			(German Football Association) 1. FC Köln
	DF	Michael Keckeisen	4 November 1973 (aged 16)			(German Football Association) VfB Stuttgart
	DF	Torsten Lieberknecht	1 August 1973 (aged 16)			(German Football Association) VfL Neustadt
	DF	Markus Schwiderowski	12 December 1973 (aged 16)			(German Football Association) FC Schalke 04
	MF	André Breitenreiter	2 October 1973 (aged 16)			(German Football Association) Hannover 96
	MF	Sven Neumann	10 August 1973 (aged 16)			(German Football Association) 1. FC Kaiserslautern
	MF	Jens Nowotny	11 January 1974 (aged 16)			(German Football Association) FC Friedrichstal
	MF	Werner Protzel	5 October 1973 (aged 16)			(German Football Association) FC Bayern München
	MF	Stefan Thiele	6 October 1973 (aged 16)			(German Football Association) Borussia Dortmund
	FW	Horst Büttner	21 August 1973 (aged 16)			(German Football Association) FC Schalke 04
	FW	Marcel Greve	11 August 1973 (aged 16)			(German Football Association) SC Concordia Hamburg
	FW	Thomas Reis	4 October 1973 (aged 16)			(German Football Association) VfB Stuttgart
	FW	Thomas Sobotzik	14 October 1974 (aged 15)			(German Football Association) VfB Stuttgart

=== France ===
Head coach:

=== Scotland ===
Head coach:

== Group D ==
=== Belgium ===
Head coach:

No.	Pos.	Player	Date of birth (age)	Caps	Goals	Club
	GK	Pascal Beeken	12 August 1973 (aged 16)			(Royal Belgian Football Association) RFC de Liège
	GK	Steven Cornelissens	27 October 1973 (aged 16)			(Royal Belgian Football Association) Lierse S.K.
	DF	Régis Genaux	31 August 1973 (aged 16)			(Royal Belgian Football Association) R. Charleroi S.C.
	DF	Stéphane Molnar	27 August 1973 (aged 16)			(Royal Belgian Football Association) Standard Liége
	DF	Karel Snoeckx	29 October 1973 (aged 16)			(Royal Belgian Football Association) Lierse SK
	DF	Tommy Van Den Bulcke	5 September 1973 (aged 16)			(Royal Belgian Football Association) Cercle Brugge K.S.V.
	DF	Olivier Verschoore	19 August 1973 (aged 16)			(Royal Belgian Football Association) R.S.C. Anderlecht
	MF	Rodrigue Derycke	24 August 1973 (aged 16)			(Royal Belgian Football Association) KV Kortrijk
	MF	Laurens Laevers	7 August 1974 (aged 15)			(Royal Belgian Football Association) K.V. Mechelen
	MF	Stéphane Monnier	13 September 1973 (aged 16)			(Royal Belgian Football Association) R.S.C. Anderlecht
	MF	Mario Roelandts	3 August 1973 (aged 16)			(Royal Belgian Football Association) R.S.C. Anderlecht
	MF	Steve Van Der Borgh	9 June 1974 (aged 15)			(Royal Belgian Football Association) V.A.V. Beerschot
	FW	Grégory Cambier	29 November 1973 (aged 16)			(Royal Belgian Football Association) K.S.V. Waregem
	FW	Michaël Goossens	30 November 1973 (aged 16)			(Royal Belgian Football Association) RFC Seraing
	FW	Dirk Huysman	3 September 1973 (aged 16)			(Royal Belgian Football Association) Lierse S.K.
	FW	Igor Six	6 August 1973 (aged 16)			(Royal Belgian Football Association) KV Kortrijk

=== East Germany ===
Head coach:

No.	Pos.	Player	Date of birth (age)	Caps	Goals	Club
	GK	Gunnar Grundmann	1 November 1973 (aged 16)			(Deutscher Fußball-Verband der DDR) Dynamo Dresden
	GK	Christian Habeck	1 November 1973 (aged 16)			(Deutscher Fußball-Verband der DDR) FC Hansa Rostock
	DF	Thomas Bleck	8 September 1973 (aged 16)			(Deutscher Fußball-Verband der DDR) FC Vorwärts Frankfurt
	DF	Uwe Ehlers	8 March 1975 (aged 15)			(Deutscher Fußball-Verband der DDR) FC Hansa Rostock
	DF	Ulf Liebich	9 April 1974 (aged 16)			(Deutscher Fußball-Verband der DDR) BFC Dynamo
	DF	Sebastian Müller	4 October 1973 (aged 16)			(Deutscher Fußball-Verband der DDR) BFC Dynamo
	DF	Mike Renke	14 February 1974 (aged 16)			(Deutscher Fußball-Verband der DDR) FC Carl Zeiss Jena
	DF	Dirk Stichert	20 December 1973 (aged 16)			(Deutscher Fußball-Verband der DDR) 1. FC Union Berlin
	MF	Sven Kaiser	27 August 1973 (aged 16)			(Deutscher Fußball-Verband der DDR) 1. FC Union Berlin
	MF	Jens Kitzing	15 January 1974 (aged 16)			(Deutscher Fußball-Verband der DDR) BFC Dynamo
	MF	René Müller	8 August 1973 (aged 16)			(Deutscher Fußball-Verband der DDR) FC Hansa Rostock
	MF	Bernd Schneider	17 November 1973 (aged 16)			(Deutscher Fußball-Verband der DDR) FC Carl Zeiss Jena
	FW	Thorsten Bernhardt	12 February 1974 (aged 16)			(Deutscher Fußball-Verband der DDR) BFC Dynamo
	FW	Recardo Egel	20 July 1974 (aged 15)			(Deutscher Fußball-Verband der DDR) FC Rot-Weiß Erfurt
	FW	Lars Krohn	8 August 1973 (aged 16)			(Deutscher Fußball-Verband der DDR) FC Hansa Rostock
	FW	Mark Zimmermann	1 March 1974 (aged 16)			(Deutscher Fußball-Verband der DDR) FC Carl Zeiss Jena

=== Spain ===
Head coach:

=== Yugoslavia ===
Head coach: Nenad Starovlah

No.	Pos.	Player	Date of birth (age)	Caps	Goals	Club
	GK	Vedran Čović	7 February 1974 (aged 16)			(Football Association of Yugoslavia) Hajduk Split
	GK	Aleksandar Saric	27 January 1974 (aged 16)			(Football Association of Yugoslavia) Red Star
	DF	Mirsad Hibić	11 October 1973 (aged 16)			(Football Association of Yugoslavia) Čelik Zenica
	DF	Uroš Predić	11 August 1973 (aged 16)			(Football Association of Yugoslavia) Red Star
	DF	Tomislav Rukavina	14 October 1974 (aged 15)			(Football Association of Yugoslavia) Osijek
	DF	Damir Salarić				(Football Association of Yugoslavia) Dinamo Zagreb
	DF	Miodrag Vukotić	8 November 1973 (aged 16)			(Football Association of Yugoslavia) Budućnost Titograd
	MF	Kemal Elkaz	10 April 1974 (aged 16)			(Football Association of Yugoslavia) Željezničar Sarajevo
	MF	Igor Jovićević	30 September 1973 (aged 16)			(Football Association of Yugoslavia) Dinamo Zagreb
	MF	Albert Nadj	29 October 1974 (aged 15)			(Football Association of Yugoslavia) Partizan
	MF	Milan Rapaic	16 August 1973 (aged 16)			(Football Association of Yugoslavia) Hajduk Split
	MF	Miodrag Pantelić	4 September 1973 (aged 16)			(Football Association of Yugoslavia) Vojvodina
	MF	Aleksandar Stanojević	28 October 1973 (aged 16)			(Football Association of Yugoslavia) Partizan
	FW	Miodrag Ćirić				(Football Association of Yugoslavia) Vojvodina
	FW	Zlatko Kostić	9 August 1973 (aged 16)			(Football Association of Yugoslavia) Budućnost Titograd
	FW	Ivica Mornar	12 January 1974 (aged 16)			(Football Association of Yugoslavia) Hajduk Split
