= List of F.C. Copenhagen players =

This is a list of association football players who have either played at least one first team match or are currently in the 2017-18 first team squad of F.C. Copenhagen.

== Key ==
GK	Goalkeeper
DF	Defender
MF	Midfielder
FW	Forward

== Players ==
Up to date as of 29 May 2017.

Name	Pos	Nat	Years	Caps	Goals	League caps	League goals
Mads Aaquist	DF	(Denmark)	2013-2014	1	0	1	0
Mustafa Abdellaoue	FW	(Norway)	2012-2014	18	5	13	4
Kevin Diks	DF	(Indonesia)	2021-2025	168	22	106	12
Johan Absalonsen	FW	(Denmark)	2011-2012	16	0	9	0
Fanendo Adi	FW	(Nigeria)	2013-2014	12	3	9	3
Jacob Albrechtsen	DF	(Denmark)	2008-2010	1	0	0	0
Martin Albrechtsen	DF	(Denmark)	2002-2004	96	1	72	0
Marcus Allbäck	FW	(Sweden)	2005-2008	120	45	85	34
Aílton José Almeida	FW	(Brazil)	2007-2010	139	37	93	21
Danny Amankwaa	FW	(Denmark)	2012–present	87	4	62	1
Daniel Amartey	DF	(Ghana)	2014–2015	63	6	44	3
Stephan Andersen	GK	(Denmark)	2014–present	76	0	53	0
Peter Ankersen	DF	(Denmark)	2015–present	86	5	62	5
Tomas Antonelius	DF	(Sweden)	2002-2003	36	0	28	0
Mikael Antonsson	DF	(Sweden)	2007-2011; 2014–2018	193	3	130	2
Mikheil Ashvetia	FW	(Georgia (country))	2001-2003	5	0	5	0
Ludwig Augustinsson	DF	(Sweden)	2015–2017	108	5	78	3
Martin B. Larsen	FW	(Denmark)	1998-2000	39	4	31	2
Morten B. Nielsen	FW	(Denmark)	1996	12	3	9	2
Christian Bank	MF	(Denmark)	1993	2	0	0	0
Frederik Bay	DF	(Denmark)	2016	1	0	0	0
Jesper Bech	FW	(Denmark)	2001-2005	56	12	37	12
Pierre Bengtsson	DF	(Sweden)	2011-2014; 2017-present	154	4	108	2
André Bergdølmo	DF	(Norway)	2005-2007	53	5	33	3
Fredrik Berglund	FW	(Sweden)	2006-2007	52	18	29	7
Martin Bergvold	MF	(Denmark)	2002-2006; 2010-2012	113	9	75	6
Martin Bernburg	FW	(Denmark)	2005-2006	7	0	1	0
Morten Bertolt	MF	(Denmark)	2004-2008	24	0	12	0
Kenneth Birkedal	MF	(Denmark)	1992	4	0	4	0
Martin Birn	DF	(Denmark)	1996	15	0	9	0
Morten Bisgaard	MF	(Denmark)	2001-2004	98	14	74	10
Anders Bjerre	FW	(Denmark)	1992-1993	12	0	7	0
Carsten Bo Nielsen	MF	(Denmark)	1993	1	0	0	0
Nicolai Boilesen	DF	(Denmark)	2016-present	13	0	8	0
Christian Bolaños	MF	(Costa Rica)	2010-2014	141	18	101	14
Daniel Braaten	MF	(Norway)	2013-2014	30	2	23	1
Jeppe Brandrup	MF	(Denmark)	2005-2007	12	0	4	0
Harald Brattbakk	FW	(Norway)	2000	35	15	31	14
Algimantis Briaunys	GK	(Lithuania)	1995	2	0	1	0
Jakob Busk	GK	(Denmark)	2012–2015	7	0	4	0
Jan Carlsen	MF	(Denmark)	1993	1	0	0	0
Kim Christensen	GK	(Denmark)	2010–present	30	0	14	0
Jesper Christiansen	GK	(Denmark)	2005-2010	211	0	141	0
Peter Christiansen	DF	(Denmark)	2000-2005	120	3	90	2
Christian Clem	MF	(Denmark)	1993	1	0	0	0
Clement Clifford	FW	(Denmark)	1997-2000	28	7	25	5
Nathan Coe	GK	(Australia)	2007-2009	7	0	3	0
Andreas Cornelius	FW	(Denmark)	2012-2013; 2014–2017	176	61	125	46
Kofi Dakinah	DF	(Denmark)	1999-2001	7	1	7	1
Claudemir de Souza	MF	(Brazil)	2010-2014	184	14	131	10
Thomas Delaney	MF	(Denmark)	2009–2016	246	24	171	19
Steve De Ridder	FW	(Belgium)	2014–2015	36	3	23	2
Pape Paté Diouf	FW	(Senegal)	2011-2014	34	6	19	4
Newroz Dogan	MF	(Denmark)	1998	1	0	0	0
Morten Falch	DF	(Denmark)	1992-1999	202	22	165	19
Rasmus Falk	FW	(Denmark)	2016–present	38	9	22	5
Yones Felfel	FW	(Denmark)	2014-2015	10	1	8	0
Heine Fernandez	FW	(Denmark)	2001	37	12	27	6
Brian Flies	GK	(Denmark)	1993-1994	24	0	20	0
Kevin Foley	DF	(Republic of Ireland)	2015	4	0	4	0
Per Frandsen	MF	(Denmark)	1994-1996	68	24	55	19
Søren Frederiksen	FW	(Denmark)	2010-2012	4	2	2	0
Carsten Fredgaard	MF	(Denmark)	2001-2006	70	3	50	3
Cristian Gamboa	DF	(Costa Rica)	2011-2012	2	0	0	0
Benny Gall	GK	(Denmark)	2001-2007	15	0	8	0
Thomas Gill	GK	(Norway)	1999	5	0	5	0
Michael Giolbas	MF	(Denmark)	1992-1995	82	2	67	1
Rúrik Gíslason	MF	(Iceland)	2012-2015	95	7	68	5
Bjarne Goldbæk	MF	(Denmark)	1996-1998	100	22	74	16
Michael Gravgaard	DF	(Denmark)	2005-2008	129	10	79	7
Ján Greguš	MF	(Slovakia)	2016-present	42	4	28	2
Christian Grindheim	MF	(Norway)	2011-2013	57	0	37	0
Jesper Grønkjær	MF	(Denmark)	2006-2011	167	26	114	16
Riffi Haddaoui	FW	(Denmark)	1993	1	1	0	0
Carsten Hallum	FW	(Denmark)	1996	14	2	13	2
Brede Hangeland	DF	(Norway)	2006-2008	107	6	63	3
Nikolaj Hansen	DF	(Denmark)	2006-2008	5	0	2	0
Piotr Haren	FW	(Denmark)	1998-2001	51	1	41	1
Carsten Hemmingsen	MF	(Denmark)	1996-2000	124	12	100	9
Brandur Hendriksson	MF	(Faroe Islands)	2014–2015	16	3	8	2
Carlo Holse	FW	(Denmark)	2017-present	1	0	0	0
Jos Hooiveld	DF	(Netherlands)	2011	12	0	12	0
Magne Hoseth	MF	(Norway)	2004-2005	42	10	28	8
Atiba Hutchinson	MF	(Canada)	2006-2010	215	29	139	22
Aki Hyryläinen	DF	(Finland)	1997-1998	18	0	14	0
Tom Høgli	DF	(Norway)	2014–present	71	1	48	1
Lars Højer	MF	(Denmark)	1992-1999	212	66	166	54
Peter Ijeh	FW	(Nigeria)	2005-2006	28	7	16	4
Henrik Imre Jensen	MF	(Denmark)	1993	1	0	0	0
Lars Jacobsen	DF	(Denmark)	2004-2007; 2011-2014	263	5	184	4
Lars Jakobsen	DF	(Denmark)	1993	1	0	0	0
Michael Jakobsen	DF	(Denmark)	2012-2013	9	0	7	0
Mukremin Jasar	FW	(Denmark)	1995	7	0	6	0
Carsten V. Jensen	MF	(Denmark)	1993-1998	138	5	112	4
Daniel Jensen	MF	(Denmark)	2013	10	0	10	0
Danni Jensen	DF	(Denmark)	2008-2011	5	0	1	0
Kenneth Jensen	FW	(Denmark)	1997-1998	17	3	13	3
Niclas Jensen	DF	(Denmark)	1998-2001; 2007-2009	213	10	159	7
Kristoffer Johannsen	MF	(Denmark)	1995	2	0	1	0
Martin Johansen	FW	(Denmark)	1992-1997	144	39	117	31
Michael Johansen	MF	(Denmark)	1992-1996	136	23	114	17
Erik Johansson	DF	(Sweden)	2016-present	62	1	41	1
Todi Jónsson	FW	(Faroe Islands)	1997-2005	207	68	167	54
José Júnior	FW	(Brazil)	2008-2009	29	15	17	6
Jørgen Juul Jensen	MF	(Denmark)	1992-1993	47	5	37	5
Mathias Jørgensen	DF	(Denmark)	2007-2012; 2014-2017	275	18	185	10
Nicolai Jørgensen	FW	(Denmark)	2012–2016	137	51	100	44
Stefan K. Hansen	FW	(Denmark)	1996-1998	28	4	22	4
Alexander Kačaniklić	MF	(Sweden)	2014	13	2	7	2
Bashkim Kadrii	FW	(Denmark)	2014–present	38	5	26	3
Thomas Kaminski	GK	(Belgium)	2015–2016	8	0	2	0
Brian Kaus	DF	(Denmark)	1992-1994	65	8	51	8
Aboubakar Keita	MF	(Ivory Coast)	2016–present	10	1	4	0
Magnus Kihlstedt	GK	(Sweden)	2001-2004	92	0	68	0
Thomas Kjærbye	MF	(Denmark)	2000-2001	4	0	3	0
Thomas Kristensen	MF	(Denmark)	2008-2014	220	11	154	5
Julian Kristoffersen	FW	(Norway)	2016–2017	4	2	2	0
Henrik Knudsen	MF	(Denmark)	1993	1	0	0	0
Kasper Kusk	MF	(Denmark)	2015–present	75	17	55	12
William Kvist	MF	(Denmark)	2004-2011; 2015–2019	425	15	285	9
Henrik Larsen	MF	(Denmark)	1996-1999	81	8	61	6
Kim Larsen	DF	(Denmark)	1993	1	0	0	0
Pierre Larsen	MF	(Denmark)	1992-1993	27	1	20	0
Peter Larsson	DF	(Sweden)	2008-2012	37	0	24	0
Brian Laudrup	FW	(Denmark)	1999	12	2	12	2
Mads Laudrup	MF	(Denmark)	2006-2009	5	0	2	0
Thomas Lauridsen	FW	(Denmark)	1999	7	1	6	0
Jacob Laursen	DF	(Denmark)	2000-2001	58	4	45	3
Ulrik Laursen	DF	(Denmark)	2008-2010	70	0	50	0
Michael Lenander	DF	(Denmark)	1993	1	0	0	0
Lasse Lindbjerg	DF	(Denmark)	2010; 2014-2015	4	0	0	0
Tobias Linderoth	MF	(Sweden)	2004-2007	127	6	82	4
Henrik Lykke	DF	(Denmark)	1993-1994; 1996-1997	43	0	36	0
Søren Lyng	FW	(Denmark)	1992-1993	14	2	13	2
Michael Lüftner	DF	(Czech Republic)	2017–present	0	0	0	0
Christian Lønstrup	MF	(Denmark)	1992-1996; 1998-2004	258	22	206	17
Kim Madsen	DF	(Denmark)	1996-2002	96	1	77	1
Michael Manniche	FW	(Denmark)	1992-1994; 1996	51	7	40	7
Georg Margreitter	DF	(Austria)	2013-2014	22	0	14	0
Marcus Mathisen	DF	(Denmark)	2015–2016	4	0	4	0
Uroš Matić	MF	(Serbia)	2017–present	21	2	15	2
Olof Mellberg	DF	(Sweden)	2013-2014	29	4	22	3
Kim Mikkelsen	FW	(Denmark)	1993-1994	45	10	35	9
Michael Mio Nielsen	MF	(Denmark)	1993-2001	285	5	232	2
Andreas Mortensen	FW	(Denmark)	2000-2002	1	0	0	0
Franco Mussis	MF	(Argentina)	2014	1	0	1	0
Thomas Myhre	GK	(Norway)	2001	14	0	14	0
Erik Mykland	MF	(Norway)	2002-2003	65	1	51	1
Peter Møller	FW	(Denmark)	1993-1994; 2001-2005	202	55	154	44
Dame N'Doye	FW	(Senegal)	2009-2012; 2018-2020	150	86	104	63
Jacob Neestrup	MF	(Denmark)	2006-2009	3	0	2	0
Allan Nielsen	MF	(Denmark)	1994-1995	31	5	26	3
Claus Nielsen	MF	(Denmark)	1996-1999	48	2	41	2
David Nielsen	FW	(Denmark)	1997-2000	133	41	108	34
Ivan Nielsen	DF	(Denmark)	1992-1993	27	2	20	2
Leif Nielsen	MF	(Denmark)	1993	1	0	0	0
Martin Nielsen	MF	(Denmark)	1996-1999	62	3	45	1
Morten Nielsen	MF	(Denmark)	1994-1998	100	10	76	7
Peter Nielsen	MF	(Denmark)	1997-1999; 2002-2003	129	20	99	12
Per Nilsson	DF	(Sweden)	2014–2015	35	2	21	0
Antti Niemi	GK	(Finland)	1995-1997	55	0	47	0
Morten Nordstrand	FW	(Denmark)	2007-2012	129	41	86	32
Hjalte Nørregaard	MF	(Denmark)	2000-2005; 2006-2010	320	34	219	22
Jores Okore	DF	(Denmark)	2016-present	8	0	5	0
Robin Olsen	GK	(Sweden)	2016-present	63	0	47	0
Will Orben	FW	(United States)	2000-2001	3	0	3	0
Sölvi Ottesen	DF	(Iceland)	2010-2013	65	13	43	8
Bryan Oviedo	DF	(Costa Rica)	2010-2012	46	2	30	2
Şaban Özdoğan	MF	(Denmark)	2006-2011	12	1	6	0
Yusuf Öztürk	MF	(Denmark)	1999-2001	18	0	17	0
Andrija Pavlović	FW	(Serbia)	2016-2018	49	11	35	8
Rune Pedersen	GK	(Denmark)	2000-2002	38	0	32	0
Kenneth Perez	FW	(Denmark)	1995-1997	37	6	30	3
Palle Petersen	GK	(Denmark)	1992-1994	66	0	51	0
Jörgen Pettersson	FW	(Sweden)	2002-2003	39	8	32	6
Torben Piechnik	DF	(Denmark)	1992	7	0	7	0
Razak Pimpong	FW	(Ghana)	2006-2007	37	1	21	0
Zdeněk Pospěch	DF	(Czech Republic)	2008-2011	151	16	108	14
Christian Poulsen	MF	(Denmark)	2000-2002; 2014-2015	77	12	61	12
Per Poulsen	GK	(Denmark)	1994-1995	30	0	24	0
Marvin Pourié	FW	(Germany)	2013–2015	24	6	15	2
William Prunier	DF	(France)	1996	11	0	11	0
Lasse Qvist	FW	(Denmark)	2006-2008	6	0	2	0
Balázs Rabóczki	GK	(Hungary)	2003-2005	64	0	42	0
Nicolai Randrup	MF	(Denmark)	1993	1	0	0	0
Brian Rasmussen	FW	(Denmark)	1992	10	3	7	2
Christoffer Remmer	DF	(Denmark)	2012–2016	67	0	49	0
Thomas Risum	GK	(Denmark)	1993	3	0	2	0
Mark Robins	FW	(England)	1996	8	4	6	4
Urmas Rooba	DF	(Estonia)	2002-2006	53	0	34	0
Mads Roerslev	DF	(Denmark)	2016-present	5	1	3	0
Thomas Rytter	DF	(Denmark)	1998-2001	114	3	95	3
Nicklas Røjkjær	FW	(Denmark)	2016-present	2	2	0	0
Thomas Røll	MF	(Denmark)	2001-2006	127	26	97	20
Janne Saarinen	DF	(Finland)	2004-2005	25	1	16	0
Federico Santander	FW	(Paraguay)	2015–present	80	34	58	25
César Santin	FW	(Brazil)	2008-2013	220	84	161	65
Álvaro Santos	FW	(Brazil)	2003-2006	120	50	84	38
Thomas Schønnemann	DF	(Denmark)	1995-1996	25	1	20	0
Mate Sestan	FW	(Croatia)	1996-1997	39	7	30	4
Björn Bergmann Sigurðarson	FW	(Iceland)	2015	17	2	14	1
Ragnar Sigurðsson	DF	(Iceland)	2011-2013	102	4	70	4
Michael Silberbauer	MF	(Denmark)	2004-2008	196	29	129	20
Pascal Simpson	MF	(Sweden)	2000-2002	25	3	23	3
Libor Sionko	MF	(Czech Republic)	2007-2009	88	12	54	9
Thobias Skovgaard	DF	(Denmark)	2010	1	0	0	0
Morten Skaaning	MF	(Denmark)	1993	1	0	0	0
Ståle Solbakken	MF	(Norway)	2000-2001	15	4	14	4
Pieros Sotiriou	FW	(Cyprus)	2017–present	0	0	0	0
Kris Stadsgaard	DF	(Denmark)	2012–2014	74	2	56	2
Michael Stensgaard	GK	(Denmark)	1998-2001	46	0	36	0
Mark Strudal	FW	(Denmark)	1993	5	1	3	0
Bo Svensson	DF	(Denmark)	1999-2006	196	4	150	4
Jacob Svinggaard	FW	(Denmark)	1996	7	4	6	3
Sebastian Svärd	DF	(Denmark)	2003	11	0	10	0
Jesper Sørensen	MF	(Denmark)	1995-1997	45	3	37	3
Jeppe Tengbjerg	FW	(Denmark)	1993	1	0	0	0
René Tengstedt	FW	(Denmark)	1993-1995	24	3	21	2
Dan Thomassen	DF	(Denmark)	2004-2007	89	4	55	3
Johnny Thomsen	DF	(Denmark)	2011-2012	17	0	7	0
Morten Thomsen	FW	(Denmark)	2010-2011	1	0	0	0
Nicolaj Thomsen	MF	(Denmark)	2017-present	0	0	0	0
Thomas Thorninger	FW	(Denmark)	1998-2001	133	28	108	18
Kenny Thorup	MF	(Denmark)	1995	12	1	10	1
Ole Tobiasen	DF	(Denmark)	1993-1995; 2003-2005	142	6	107	5
Youssef Toutouh	FW	(Morocco)	2011–present	156	18	103	14
Christian Traoré	MF	(Denmark)	2001-2005	63	1	46	0
Diego Tur	DF	(Denmark)	1993-2001	227	15	192	12
Iørn Uldbjerg	MF	(Denmark)	1992-1998	159	16	129	13
Elrio van Heerden	MF	(South Africa)	2001-2005	38	7	25	5
Donatas Vencevičius	MF	(Lithuania)	1999-2001	51	2	46	2
Benjamin Verbič	MF	(Slovenia)	2015–present	72	11	54	9
Igor Vetokele	FW	(Belgium)	2012-2014	54	19	44	16
Martin Vingaard	MF	(Denmark)	2009-2013	141	23	97	16
Nicolai Wael	MF	(Denmark)	1992-1993	2	0	0	0
Kenneth Wegner	DF	(Denmark)	1992-1994	47	0	38	0
Oscar Wendt	DF	(Sweden)	2006-2011	204	6	138	6
Mads Westh	FW	(Denmark)	1999-2002	10	2	9	2
Johan Wiland	GK	(Sweden)	2009-2015	192	0	141	0
Mikkel Wohlgemuth	MF	(Denmark)	2013–2015	3	0	2	0
Rasmus Würtz	MF	(Denmark)	2007-2009	33	0	18	0
Karim Zaza	GK	(Morocco)	1995-2000	98	0	80	0
Bora Zivkovic	DF	(Denmark)	2000-2004	58	6	49	5
Kenneth Zohore	FW	(Denmark)	2010-2012	23	1	16	1
Sibusiso Zuma	FW	(South Africa)	2000-2005	188	52	145	40
