= 1990 UEFA European Under-16 Championship =

U-16-Fußball-Europameisterschaft 1990

Tournament details
- Host country: East Germany
- Dates: 17–27 May
- Teams: 16 (from 1 confederation)

Final positions
- Champions: Czechoslovakia (1st title)
- Runners-up: Yugoslavia
- Third place: Poland
- Fourth place: Portugal

Tournament statistics
- Matches played: 28
- Goals scored: 79 (2.82 per match)

The 1990 UEFA European Under-16 Championship was the 8th edition of the UEFA's European Under-16 Football Championship. Players born on or after 1 August 1973 were eligible to participate in this competition. Then East Germany hosted the 16 teams that contested 17–27 May 1990.

Portugal unsuccessfully defended their first title.

Czechoslovakia won their first title.

== Participants ==
- Belgium
- Czechoslovakia
- Cyprus
- Denmark
- East Germany
- France
- Hungary
- Northern Ireland
- Poland
- Portugal
- Scotland
- Spain
- Sweden
- Turkey
- West Germany
- Yugoslavia

== Results ==
=== First stage ===
==== Group A ====
Pos	Team	Pld	W	D	L	GF	GA	GD	Pts
1	Portugal	3	2	1	0	7	4	+3	5
2	Denmark	3	2	0	1	10	3	+7	4
3	Northern Ireland	3	1	0	2	3	8	−5	2
4	Turkey	3	0	1	2	2	7	−5	1

Source: RSSSF
17 May 1990

Denmark	3–0	Turkey
Kenneth Rasmussen 4'; Jeppe Tengbjerg 26', 65'

Leinefelde
17 May 1990

Northern Ireland	1–2	Portugal
Gary Wilkinson 45'		Daniel Kenedy 17'; Hugo Porfírio 78'

Arnstadt

19 May 1990

Northern Ireland	0–6	Denmark
		Henrik Andersen 2'; Morten Falch 20'; Kenneth Rasmussen 27'; Jeppe Tengbjerg 33', 71', 74'

Eisenach
19 May 1990

Portugal	2–2	Turkey
Hernâni 20'; Sérgio Ribeiro 32'		Mevlüt Kahraman 41', 76'

Sondershausen

21 May 1990

Northern Ireland	2–0	Turkey
McDowell 3'; Mooney 46'

Weimar
21 May 1990

Portugal	3–1	Denmark
Poejo 10'; Costa 35', 77'		Anders Mikkelsen 69'

Mühlhausen

==== Group B ====
Pos	Team	Pld	W	D	L	GF	GA	GD	Pts
1	Poland	3	2	1	0	6	1	+5	5
2	Sweden	3	1	2	0	6	3	+3	4
3	Cyprus	3	1	0	2	2	6	−4	2
4	Hungary	3	0	1	2	2	6	−4	1

Source: RSSSF
17 May 1990

Poland	3–0	Cyprus
Piotr Apryjas 7'; Aristocleous 32' (o.g.); Andrzej Sazanowicz 78'

Kölleda
17 May 1990

Sweden	2–2	Hungary
Peter Vougt 31'; Thomas Kvist 66'		Sandor 16' (pen.); Tibor Dombi 60'

Tambach

19 May 1990

Cyprus	2–0	Hungary
Minas 38'; Mavris 74'

Erfurt
19 May 1990

Poland	1–1	Sweden
Sławomir Wojciechowski 33'		Jesper Ljung 65'

Nordhausen

21 May 1990

Sweden	3–0	Cyprus
Peter Vougt 55', 74'; Thomas Kvist 69'

Heiligenstadt
21 May 1990

Hungary	0–2	Poland
		Grzegorz Poleszak 8'; Andrzej Sazanowicz 46'

Bad Salzungen

==== Group C ====
Pos	Team	Pld	W	D	L	GF	GA	GD	Pts
1	Czechoslovakia	3	2	1	0	5	0	+5	5
2	West Germany	3	1	2	0	6	2	+4	4
3	France	3	0	2	1	2	4	−2	2
4	Scotland	3	0	1	2	2	9	−7	1

Source: RSSSF
17 May 1990

France	1–1	Scotland
Bernard Diomède 63'		Burns 56'

Bad Langensalza
17 May 1990

West Germany	0–0	Czechoslovakia

Ruhla

19 May 1990

Czechoslovakia	2–0	France
Patrik Berger 5'; Marek Penksa 51'

Apolda
19 May 1990

West Germany	5–1	Scotland
Thomas Reis 33'; Thomas Sobotzik 65'; Jens Nowotny 71'; Marcel Greve 75'; André Breitenreiter 78'		McRonald 63'

Sömmerda

21 May 1990

West Germany	1–1	France
Tetu 63' (o.g.)		Bernard Diomède 4'

Sondershausen
21 May 1990

Czechoslovakia	3–0	Scotland
Tomáš Votava 18', 44'; Marek Vomáčka 19'

Ilmenau

==== Group D ====
Pos	Team	Pld	W	D	L	GF	GA	GD	Pts
1	Yugoslavia	3	3	0	0	4	0	+4	6
2	Spain	3	2	0	1	4	2	+2	4
3	East Germany (H)	3	0	1	2	2	5	−3	1
4	Belgium	3	0	1	2	1	4	−3	1

Source: RSSSF
(H) Hosts
17 May 1990

Yugoslavia	2–0	Belgium
Miodrag Pantelić 42'; Albert Nađ 70'

Gera
17 May 1990

Spain	3–1	East Germany
Julen Guerrero 30', 32', 73'		Dirk Stichert 79'

Elsterberg

19 May 1990

Yugoslavia	1–0	East Germany
Zlatko Kostić 68'

Weida
19 May 1990

Spain	1–0	Belgium
Patri Bernal 59'

Lobenstein

21 May 1990

East Germany	1–1	Belgium
Mark Zimmermann 19'		Igor Six 37' (pen.)

Rudolstadt
21 May 1990

Yugoslavia	1–0	Spain
Miodrag Pantelić 39'

Zeulenroda

=== Semi-finals ===
24 May 1990

Poland	1–4	Yugoslavia
Michał Biskup 20'		Milan Rapaić 12'; Zlatko Kostić 19'; Miodrag Pantelić 68'; Zoran Ćirić 77'

Sömmerda

24 May 1990

Portugal	0–0	Czechoslovakia
Penalties
Costa (penalty scored); Poejo (penalty scored); Daniel Kenedy (penalty scored)	3–5	(penalty scored) Gabriel Ungvölgyi; (penalty scored) Patrik Berger; (penalty scored) Martin Čížek; (penalty scored) Zdeněk Cieslar; (penalty scored) Radim Šulek

Nordhausen

=== Third place match ===
27 May 1990

Portugal	2–3	Poland
Nuno Santos 17'; Alexandre Monteiro 78'		Artur Ficoń 23'; Krzysztof Przała 49'; Michał Biskup 63'

Erfurt

=== Final ===
27 May 1990

Czechoslovakia	3–2 (a.e.t.)	Yugoslavia
Marek Penksa 44'; Patrik Berger 60'; Martin Čížek 97'		Miodrag Pantelić 31'; Aleksandar Stanojević 43'

Georgij-Dimitroff-Stadion, Erfurt
Referee: Sándor Varga (Hungary)
