= 1990 UEFA European Under-16 Championship qualifying =

Football tournament qualification stage

== Results ==
=== Group I ===
| Pos | Team | Pld | W | D | L | GF | GA | GD | Pts |
|---|---|---|---|---|---|---|---|---|---|
| 1 | Sweden | 2 | 2 | 0 | 0 | 7 | 3 | +4 | 4 |
| 2 | Iceland | 2 | 0 | 0 | 2 | 3 | 7 | −4 | 0 |

Source: RSSSF
28 September 1989

| Iceland | 0–2 | Sweden |
|---|---|---|
| | | Thomas Kvist 29'; Vougt 79' |

Reykjavík

11 October 1989

| Sweden | 5–3 | Iceland |
|---|---|---|
| Ljung 15', 77'; Thomas Kvist 56'; Vougt 62', 80+2' | | Benediktsson 7'; Þorvaldsson 67'; Guðjónsson 71' |

Borlänge

=== Group II ===
| Pos | Team | Pld | W | D | L | GF | GA | GD | Pts |
|---|---|---|---|---|---|---|---|---|---|
| 1 | Denmark | 2 | 1 | 1 | 0 | 4 | 2 | +2 | 3 |
| 2 | Finland | 2 | 0 | 1 | 1 | 2 | 4 | −2 | 1 |

Source: RSSSF
26 September 1989

| Finland | 1–3 | Denmark |
|---|---|---|
| Teemu Ingi 79' | | Tengbjerg 46'; René Mellin 59'; Anders Mikkelsen 78' |

Lappeenranta

24 October 1989

| Denmark | 1–1 | Finland |
|---|---|---|
| Tengbjerg 4' | | Sumiala 68' |

Silkeborg

=== Group III ===
| Pos | Team | Pld | W | D | L | GF | GA | GD | Pts |
|---|---|---|---|---|---|---|---|---|---|
| 1 | Northern Ireland | 2 | 1 | 1 | 0 | 4 | 3 | +1 | 3 |
| 2 | Wales | 2 | 0 | 1 | 1 | 3 | 4 | −1 | 1 |

Source: RSSSF
21 November 1989

| Wales | 2–3 | Northern Ireland |
|---|---|---|
| Pugh 11'; Morgan 74' | | McDowell 30', 34', 74' |

Rhyl

6 March 1990

| Northern Ireland | 1–1 | Wales |
|---|---|---|
| Finlay 69' | | Devine/Pugh 44' |

Belfast

=== Group IV ===
| Pos | Team | Pld | W | D | L | GF | GA | GD | Pts |
|---|---|---|---|---|---|---|---|---|---|
| 1 | West Germany | 2 | 2 | 0 | 0 | 8 | 1 | +7 | 4 |
| 2 | Luxembourg | 2 | 0 | 0 | 2 | 1 | 8 | −7 | 0 |

Source: RSSSF
13 December 1989

| Luxembourg | 1–5 | West Germany |
|---|---|---|
| Folscheid 38' | | Nowotny 3'; Schmidt 22', 60'; Nikolajewicz 41'; Büttner 68' |

Luxembourg City

4 April 1990

| West Germany | 3–0 | Luxembourg |
|---|---|---|
| Breitenreiter 16', 76'; Stefan Thiele 17' |

Saarbrücken

=== Group V ===
| Pos | Team | Pld | W | D | L | GF | GA | GD | Pts |
|---|---|---|---|---|---|---|---|---|---|
| 1 | Spain | 2 | 2 | 0 | 0 | 10 | 0 | +10 | 4 |
| 2 | Liechtenstein | 2 | 0 | 0 | 2 | 0 | 10 | −10 | 0 |

Source: RSSSF
2 December 1989

| Liechtenstein | 0–3 | Spain |
|---|---|---|
| | | Aitor Etxaburu 8'; Guerrero 19'; Morales 27' |

Schaan

24 October 1989

| Spain | 7–0 | Liechtenstein |
|---|---|---|
| Aitor Etxaburu 36', 76'; Palacios Fernández 50'; Morales 52' (pen.); Rodriguez Marín 54'; Guerrero 59', 64' |

Alcalá de Henares

=== Group VI ===
| Pos | Team | Pld | W | D | L | GF | GA | GD | Pts |
|---|---|---|---|---|---|---|---|---|---|
| 1 | Czechoslovakia | 2 | 2 | 0 | 0 | 14 | 0 | +14 | 4 |
| 2 | Malta | 2 | 0 | 0 | 2 | 0 | 14 | −14 | 0 |

Source: RSSSF
25 October 1989

| Czechoslovakia | 9–0 | Malta |
|---|---|---|
| Penksa 13', 57', 59'; Guzik 22'; David 38'; Matejka 63'; Čížek 65'; Berger 71'; Cieslar 79' |

Slaný

4 April 1990

| Malta | 0–5 | Czechoslovakia |
|---|---|---|
| | | Matejka; Votava; Čížek; Radim Šulek |

Ta' Qali

=== Group VII ===
| Pos | Team | Pld | W | D | L | GF | GA | GD | Pts |
|---|---|---|---|---|---|---|---|---|---|
| 1 | Turkey | 2 | 1 | 0 | 1 | 2 | 2 | 0 | 2 (Note: Away goals: Turkey 2, Austria 1.) |
| 2 | Austria | 2 | 1 | 0 | 1 | 2 | 2 | 0 | 2 |

Source: RSSSF
Notes:
8 November 1989

| Turkey | 0–1 | Austria |
|---|---|---|
| | | Jankai 34' |

Istanbul

4 April 1990

| Austria | 1–2 | Turkey |
|---|---|---|
| Jovanovic 33' | | Murat Duran 26'; Kurtulmuş 76' |

Hartberg

=== Group VIII ===
| Pos | Team | Pld | W | D | L | GF | GA | GD | Pts |
|---|---|---|---|---|---|---|---|---|---|
| 1 | Cyprus | 2 | 2 | 0 | 0 | 4 | 2 | +2 | 4 |
| 2 | Greece | 2 | 0 | 0 | 2 | 2 | 4 | −2 | 0 |

Source: RSSSF
7 March 1990

| Cyprus | 2–1 | Greece |
|---|---|---|
| Sofocleous 39'; Chiras 65' | | Giatas 32' |

Aradippou

4 April 1990

| Greece | 1–2 | Cyprus |
|---|---|---|
| Giatas 2' | | Kapsalis 30', 46' |

Lamia

=== Group IX ===
| Pos | Team | Pld | W | D | L | GF | GA | GD | Pts |
|---|---|---|---|---|---|---|---|---|---|
| 1 | Poland | 4 | 2 | 1 | 1 | 7 | 3 | +4 | 5 |
| 2 | Netherlands | 4 | 2 | 0 | 2 | 4 | 11 | −7 | 4 |
| 3 | Italy | 4 | 1 | 1 | 2 | 7 | 4 | +3 | 3 |

Source: RSSSF
8 November 1989

| Poland | 1–2 | Netherlands |
|---|---|---|
| Piotr Apryjas 9' (pen.) | | Alberda 64'; Mark Wijnreder 66' |

Iława

22 November 1989

| Netherlands | 0–4 | Poland |
|---|---|---|
| | | Chańko/Ratajczyk 7'; Andrzej Sazanowicz 22' (pen.); Biskup 38'; Apryjas/Sazanowicz 78' |

Middelburg

6 December 1989

| Italy | 1–1 | Poland |
|---|---|---|
| Traversa 1' | | Przała 79' |

Ostia

28 February 1990

| Netherlands | 1–0 | Italy |
|---|---|---|
| Mark Wijnreder 72' |

Katwijk

14 March 1990

| Poland | 1–0 | Italy |
|---|---|---|
| Wojciechowski 60' |

Warsaw

4 April 1990

| Italy | 6–1 | Netherlands |
|---|---|---|
| Firmino Elia 14', 22'; Baglieri 27'; Traversa 34', 40'; Elia/Pupita 60' | | Oulida 80' |

Molfetta

=== Group X ===
| Pos | Team | Pld | W | D | L | GF | GA | GD | Pts |
|---|---|---|---|---|---|---|---|---|---|
| 1 | Hungary | 2 | 2 | 0 | 0 | 6 | 0 | +6 | 4 |
| 2 | Bulgaria | 2 | 0 | 0 | 2 | 0 | 6 | −6 | 0 |

Source: RSSSF
22 October 1989

| Bulgaria | 0–3 Awarded | Hungary |
|---|---|---|
| Ivanov 17'; Zhabov 60' |

Kyustendil

4 April 1990

| Hungary | 3–0 Awarded | Bulgaria |
|---|---|---|
| | | Zhabov 77' |

Budapest

=== Group XI ===
| Pos | Team | Pld | W | D | L | GF | GA | GD | Pts |
|---|---|---|---|---|---|---|---|---|---|
| 1 | France | 2 | 1 | 0 | 1 | 2 | 1 | +1 | 2 |
| 2 | Switzerland | 2 | 1 | 0 | 1 | 1 | 2 | −1 | 2 |

Source: RSSSF
6 December 1989

| France | 2–0 | Switzerland |
|---|---|---|
| Tetu 5'; Marquet 51' |

Annemasse

28 March 1990

| Switzerland | 1–0 | France |
|---|---|---|
| Andreas Hediger 68' |

Sion

=== Group XII ===
| Pos | Team | Pld | W | D | L | GF | GA | GD | Pts |
|---|---|---|---|---|---|---|---|---|---|
| 1 | Portugal | 2 | 2 | 0 | 0 | 7 | 0 | +7 | 4 |
| 2 | San Marino | 2 | 0 | 0 | 2 | 0 | 7 | −7 | 0 |

Source: RSSSF
7 March 1990

| San Marino | 0–3 | Portugal |
|---|---|---|
| | | Nuno Miguel 35'; Hugo Porfírio 60', 77' |

Serravalle

28 March 1990

| Portugal | 4–0 | San Marino |
|---|---|---|
| Poejo 23', 71'; Litos 41', 74' |

Esposende

=== Group XIII ===
| Pos | Team | Pld | W | D | L | GF | GA | GD | Pts |
|---|---|---|---|---|---|---|---|---|---|
| 1 | Scotland | 4 | 2 | 1 | 1 | 5 | 4 | +1 | 5 |
| 2 | Romania | 4 | 1 | 2 | 1 | 6 | 5 | +1 | 4 |
| 3 | Norway | 4 | 1 | 1 | 2 | 4 | 6 | −2 | 3 |

Source: RSSSF
22 September 1989

| Norway | 1–1 | Romania |
|---|---|---|
| Larsen 37' | | Papa 55' |

Oslo

4 October 1989

| Norway | 2–0 | Scotland |
|---|---|---|
| Rannestad 68'; Sigve Fredriksen 72' |

Bryne

27 October 1989

| Romania | 3–1 | Norway |
|---|---|---|
| Manea 43'; Velcea 63', 75' | | Larsen 78' |

Buzău

7 November 1989

| Romania | 2–2 | Scotland |
|---|---|---|
| Filipecsu 17', 38' | | Dailly 3'; McRonald 70' |

Braila

14 November 1989

| Scotland | 2–0 | Norway |
|---|---|---|
| Dailly 11', 62' |

Dunfermline

27 March 1990

| Scotland | 1–0 | Romania |
|---|---|---|
| Lavery 55' |

Kilmarnock

=== Group XIV ===
| Pos | Team | Pld | W | D | L | GF | GA | GD | Pts |
|---|---|---|---|---|---|---|---|---|---|
| 1 | Belgium | 2 | 1 | 1 | 0 | 2 | 1 | +1 | 3 |
| 2 | Republic of Ireland | 2 | 0 | 1 | 1 | 1 | 2 | −1 | 1 |

Source: RSSSF
22 November 1989

| Belgium | 2–1 | Republic of Ireland |
|---|---|---|
| Monnier 66', 67' | | O'Neill 28' |

Diegem

4 April 1990

| Republic of Ireland | 0–0 | Belgium |

Dublin

=== Group XV ===
| Pos | Team | Pld | W | D | L | GF | GA | GD | Pts |
|---|---|---|---|---|---|---|---|---|---|
| 1 | Yugoslavia | 2 | 1 | 0 | 1 | 2 | 1 | +1 | 2 |
| 2 | Soviet Union | 2 | 1 | 0 | 1 | 1 | 2 | −1 | 2 |

Source: RSSSF
23 March 1990

| Yugoslavia | 2–0 | Soviet Union |
|---|---|---|
| Milošević 32', 69' |

Pancevo

7 April 1990

| Soviet Union | 1–0 | Yugoslavia |
|---|---|---|
| Chudin 59' |

Kishinev
