= Orben =

Orben is a surname. Notable people with the surname include:

- Amy Orben, experimental psychologist
- C. Milford Orben (1898–1975), American politician
- Robert Orben (1927–2023), American professional comedy writer
- Will Orben (born 1974), American former professional soccer player
