= 2000–01 F.C. Copenhagen season =

F.C. Copenhagen
2000–01 season
- Manager: Roy Hodgson
- Danish Superliga: 1st
- Danish Cup: Fifth round
- Top goalscorer: Todi Jónsson (12)

During the 2000–01 Danish football season, F.C. Copenhagen competed in the Danish Superliga.

== Season summary ==
After several seasons of midtable mediocrity, new manager Roy Hodgson led Copenhagen to their first league title since 1993. However, at the end of the season Hodgson moved to Italian club Udinese.

== Squad ==
Squad at end of season

Note: Flags indicate national team as defined under FIFA eligibility rules; some limited exceptions apply. Players may hold more than one non-FIFA nationality.

No.	Pos.	Nation	Player
—	GK	DEN	Rune Pedersen
—	GK	DEN	Michael Stensgaard
—	DF	DEN	Peter Christiansen
—	DF	DEN	Kofi Dakinah
—	DF	DEN	Niclas Jensen
—	DF	DEN	Jacob Laursen
—	DF	DEN	Kim Madsen
—	DF	DEN	Thomas Rytter
—	DF	DEN	Bo Svensson
—	DF	DEN	Diego Tur
—	DF	DEN	Bora Zivkovic
—	MF	DEN	Thomas Kjærbye
—	MF	DEN	Christian Lønstrup
—	MF	DEN	Michael Mio Nielsen (captain)

No.	Pos.	Nation	Player
—	MF	DEN	Hjalte Nørregaard
—	MF	DEN	Yusuf Öztürk
—	MF	DEN	Christian Poulsen
—	MF	NOR	Ståle Solbakken
—	MF	SWE	Pascal Simpson
—	MF	LTU	Donatas Vencevičius
—	FW	DEN	Piotr Haren
—	FW	DEN	Andreas Mortensen
—	FW	DEN	Thomas Thorninger
—	FW	DEN	Mads Westh
—	FW	NOR	Harald Brattbakk
—	FW	FRO	Todi Jónsson
—	FW	RSA	Sibusiso Zuma
—	FW	USA	Will Orben

== See also ==
- 2000–01 Danish Superliga
