= Richmond Park (football ground) =

Football stadium in Dublin, Ireland

Coordinates: 53°20′27″N 06°19′0″W

- Richer
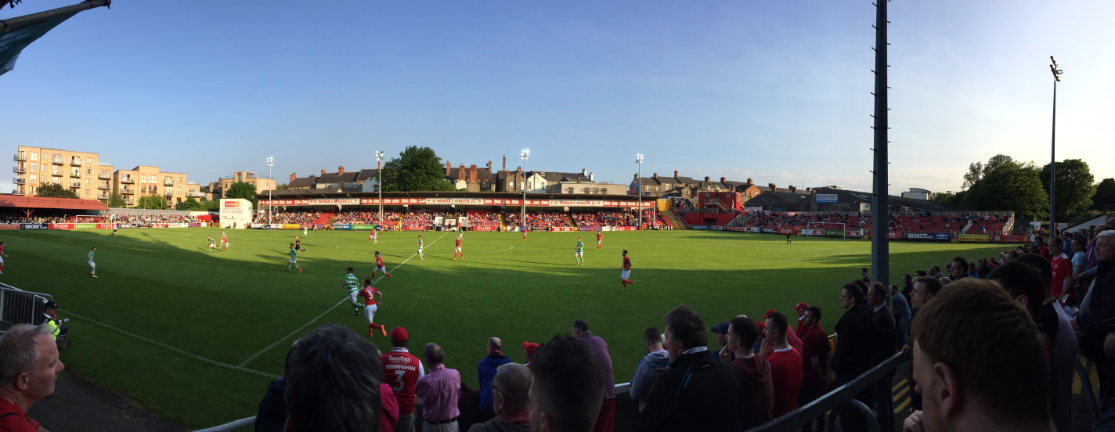

- Location within Dublin
- Full name: Richmond Park
- Owner: St Patrick's Athletic F.C.
- Operator: St Patrick's Athletic F.C.
- Capacity: 5,500 (2,800 seated)
- Field size: 108 x 64 m
- Public transit: Goldenbridge Luas stop (Red Line); Emmet Road bus stop (Dublin Bus 13, G1, G2)

Construction
- Built: 1925; 101 years ago
- Opened: 1925; 101 years ago

Tenants
- Brideville F.C. (1925–1930); St Patrick's Athletic F.C. (1939–present)

Richmond Park is a football stadium in Dublin, Ireland. Situated in the Dublin suburb of Inchicore, it is the home ground of League of Ireland side St Patrick's Athletic (also known as St Pat's). The area where the ground now stands was formerly used as a recreational area by the British Army, who were stationed at the nearby Richmond Barracks, both named after Charles Lennox, 4th Duke of Richmond the barracks having since been demolished.

== History ==
After the creation of the Irish Free State, and therefore the removal of the British Army, the ground lay idle for 3 years before League of Ireland club Brideville began using the ground in 1925. In 1930 Brideville were forced to move to Harolds Cross Greyhound Stadium. St Patrick's Athletic moved into the ground in 1939 and continued to use and develop the ground until 1951 when they entered the League of Ireland. The league deemed the ground unsuitable and St. Pats were forced to use a variety of grounds in Dublin as they fought to upgrade Richmond Park. In 1960, after serious development, the ground played host to St Pat's first home league game in Inchicore. The ground closed for redevelopment in May 1989, however, due to St Pats hitting financially difficulties they did not return until 5 December 1993.

The ground lies behind a row of terraced housing in a natural valley and is often used for Republic of Ireland underage and women's teams. It staged the League of Ireland Cup final in 1982 and 2003. It has played host to two Leinster Senior Cup finals, as well as many junior and intermediate finals. From 2001–2004 Shamrock Rovers played their home games in Richmond Park as tenants of Pats. In 2005, Dublin City played the first 10 games of their season in the ground, under a similar arrangement. Richmond Park is usually used by non-league clubs in surrounding areas when they qualify for the FAI Cup.

It staged its first European game in July 1996 when Slovan Bratislava visited in a 1996–97 UEFA Cup tie.

In 2005, the board of St Patrick's Athletic spoke to their fans about a potential move to a new municipal stadium in Tallaght where they would share with Shamrock Rovers. Outraged by this, the club's fans revolted and a pressure group called 'Pats for Richmond' was set up to mobilise and organise opposition to the plan. In July 2006, the St. Pat's board of directors gave a clear indication of staying put by purchasing local pub Richmond House (also known as McDowells) in order to give the club's fans a social base.

In 2006 the club qualified for Europe for the first time since 2002 via the 2006 FAI Cup final and with the club needing a bigger seating capacity to play in the UEFA Cup, the grass bank behind the Inchicore End goal was dug up and levelled out with concrete and a new temporary stand was built made up of a metal frame and wooden boards. In 2011, at the UEFA Europa League clash between Pats and ÍBV of Iceland, a supporter fell through one of the wooden boards while celebrating a goal. This led to the top half of the stand being closed for the next round against Shakhter Karagandy from Kazakhstan and the stand being closed entirely for the remainder of the 2011 season. Before the start of the 2012 season, any wooden boards that were deemed dangerous were swapped with safe ones from the top half of the stand that remained closed, and the bottom half of the stand was reopened for the club's 5–1 win against Shamrock Rovers and remained open for the rest of the season. There was only two games that were an exception to the stand being open, the Europa League game, once again against ÍBV, when the UEFA delegate deemed the stand unsafe to use for supporters and the next round of the Europa League against Bosnian side Široki Brijeg when once again the UEFA delegate deemed the stand unsafe, but his decision was overruled by the Garda Síochána due to overcrowding in the Main Stand as a result of the tickets being oversold. Midway through the 2013 season, the St.Pat's Supporters Club, the Patron Saints, donated €50,000 to the club for the stand to be dismantled and rebuilt using metal flooring instead of wooden. The first time the new stand was used was a sold-out fixture against Lithuanian side Žalgiris in the UEFA Europa League on 11 July 2013. the stand was officially opened on 27 July 2013 in front of Supporters, Players and Management and given the official name of 'The Patrons' Stand'.

In April 2018, St Patrick's Athletic proposed a plan to leave their Richmond Park home in favour of a move across the road to the St Michael's Estate site where it was speculated that a 12,000 seater stadium and shopping facility, the Richmond Arena, could be built. However, the proposed site was owned by Dublin City Council and the council did not agree to the proposal and progressed its own plans to develop housing on the site instead.

In 2020, Richmond Park played host to the League of Ireland Relegation/Promotion Playoff final between Shelbourne and Longford Town behind closed doors due to COVID-19, Longford ended up winning 1-0 via a Rob Manley Goal.

== Facilities ==
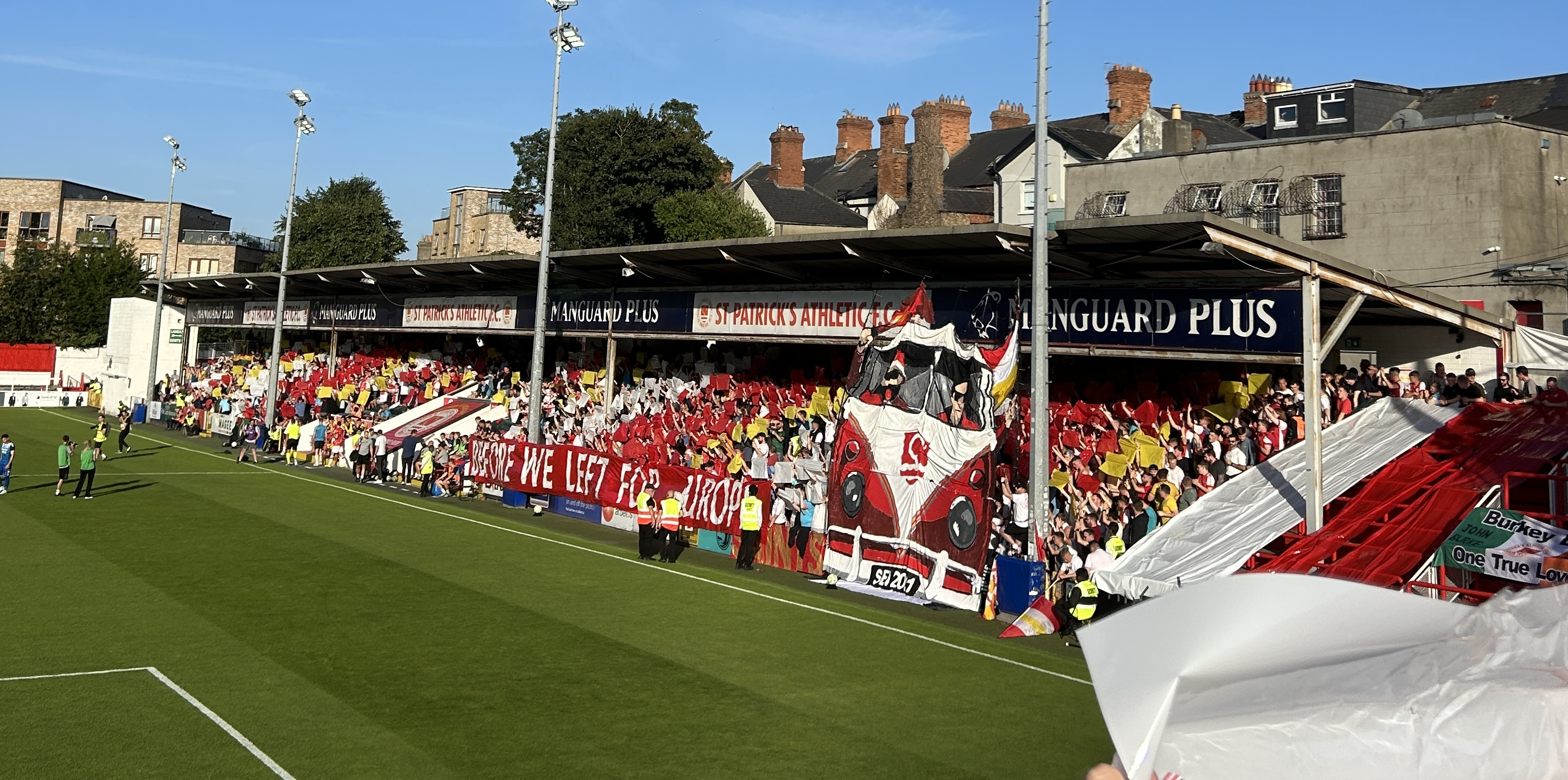
Fans in the Main Stand before the UEFA Conference League fixture between St Patrick's Athletic and Hegelmann in 2025.

The main stand seats 1,800 people. Behind one goal, at the Inchicore end, space was constructed into a new uncovered stand in time for the 2007 UEFA Cup campaign of St Patrick's Athletic F.C. This stand seats 1,000 and is known as the West (or 'New') Stand. The hardcore St. Pat's supporters have traditionally gathered at the other end, in the 'Shed End', though in more recent times the Shed has housed the away supporters while the more vocal Pat's fans have moved to the main stand. Although known locally as the "Shed End" the official name is the John Minnock stand, as it was financed with money received from his transfer to Charlton Athletic. It was originally a fully covered terrace before half the roof was removed in the early 2000s and the other half in early 2020, leaving it as an uncovered terrace. The Camac terrace, across from the main stand, is used by home fans, and named after the river that runs behind it. The Camac holds the ground's TV gantry.

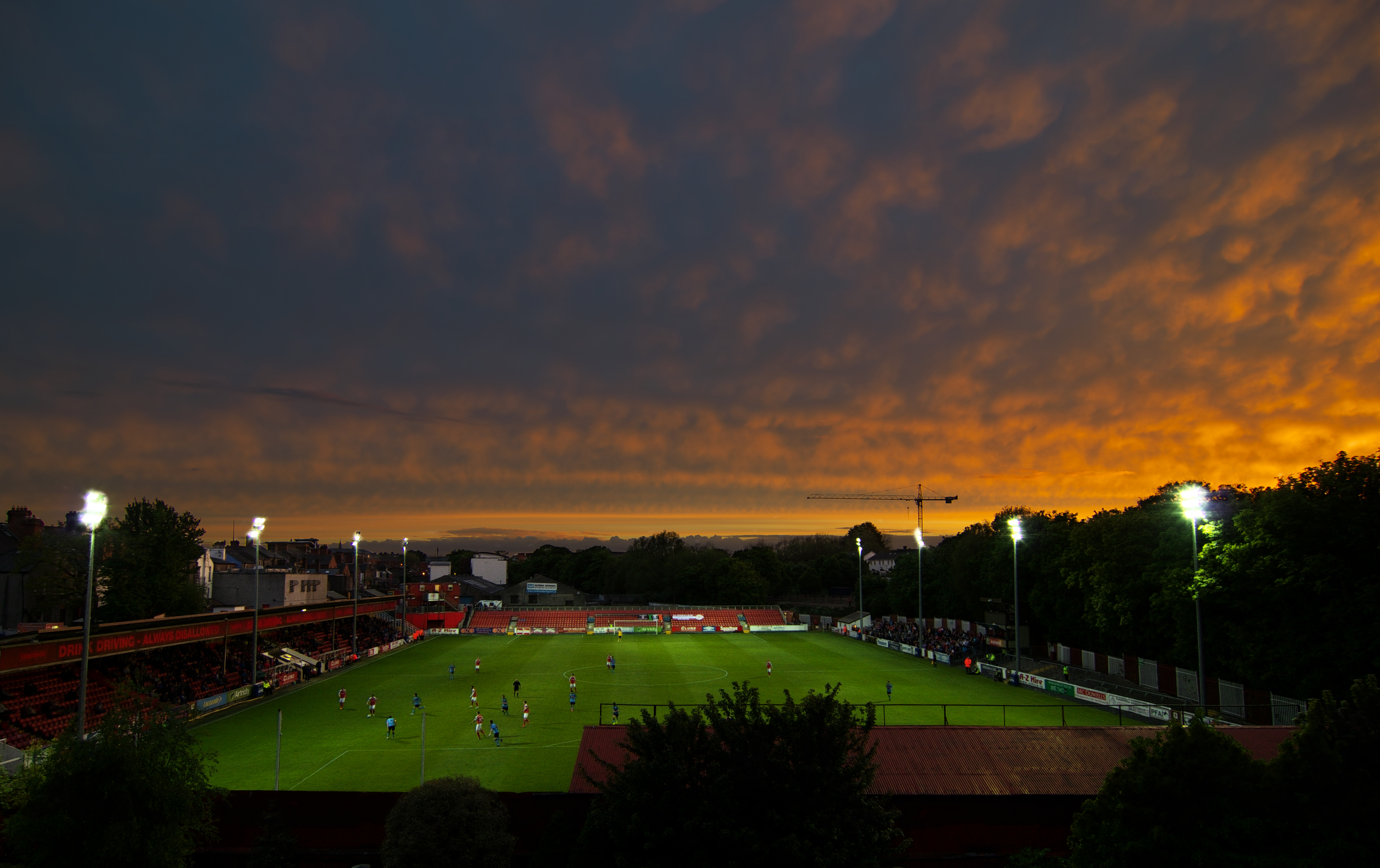
Richmond Park during an Association football game between St Patrick's Athletic and UCD

== Other uses ==
Richmond Park hosted Ireland's first-ever outdoor rock festival on 4 September 1970. Headlined by Mungo Jerry, the lineup also featured one of the earliest performances of the then recently formed Thin Lizzy. A crowd of several thousand had been expected but, in the event, widespread rumours of a Garda drugs bust and poor weather kept the attendance to an estimated 800.

== Notable players ==
List of players that have been included in squads at senior international tournaments to have played at Richmond Park, in order of their first appearance at the ground.

Player	National Team	Tournament squad(s)	First appearance	First fixture (player's club in bold)
Oskar van Hattum	New Zealand	2024 OFC Men's Nations Cup (1st)	28 February 2025, League of Ireland	St Patrick's Athletic 4–3 **Sligo Rovers**
Mirlind Daku	Albania	UEFA Euro 2024	21 July 2022, UEFA Europa Conference League	St Patrick's Athletic 1–1 **Mura**
Max Mata	New Zealand	2024 OFC Men's Nations Cup (1st)	25 February 2022, League of Ireland	St Patrick's Athletic 1–2 **Sligo Rovers**
Nando Pijnaker	New Zealand	2020 Olympics, 2026 FIFA World Cup	25 February 2022, League of Ireland	St Patrick's Athletic 1–2 **Sligo Rovers**
Joseph Anang	Ghana	2026 FIFA World Cup	5 February 2022, friendly	**St Patrick's Athletic** 1–0 Cork City
Vítězslav Jaroš	Czech Republic	UEFA Euro 2024	27 March 2021, League of Ireland	**St Patrick's Athletic** 2–1 Drogheda United
Andre Burley	Saint Kitts and Nevis	2023 CONCACAF Gold Cup	14 February 2020, League of Ireland	St Patrick's Athletic 0–1 **Waterford**
Willy Caballero	Argentina	2004 Olympics (1st), 2005 FIFA Confederations Cup (2nd), 2018 FIFA World Cup	13 July 2019, friendly	St Patrick's Athletic 0–4 **Chelsea**
Michy Batshuayi	Belgium	UEFA Euro 2016, 2018 FIFA World Cup (3rd), UEFA Euro 2020, 2022 FIFA World Cup	13 July 2019, friendly	St Patrick's Athletic 0–4 **Chelsea**
David Luiz	Brazil	2011 Copa América, 2013 FIFA Confederations Cup (1st), 2014 FIFA World Cup (4th), 2015 Copa América	13 July 2019, friendly	St Patrick's Athletic 0–4 **Chelsea**
Mateo Kovačić	Croatia	2014 FIFA World Cup, UEFA Euro 2016, 2018 FIFA World Cup (2nd), UEFA Euro 2020, 2022 FIFA World Cup (3rd), UEFA Euro 2024, 2026 FIFA World Cup	13 July 2019, friendly	St Patrick's Athletic 0–4 **Chelsea**
Andreas Christensen	Denmark	UEFA Euro 2020, 2022 FIFA World Cup, UEFA Euro 2024, 2026 FIFA World Cup	13 July 2019, friendly	St Patrick's Athletic 0–4 **Chelsea**
Ross Barkley	England	2014 FIFA World Cup, UEFA Euro 2016	13 July 2019, friendly	St Patrick's Athletic 0–4 **Chelsea**
Mason Mount	England	UEFA Euro 2020 (2nd), 2022 FIFA World Cup	13 July 2019, friendly	St Patrick's Athletic 0–4 **Chelsea**
Olivier Giroud	France	UEFA Euro 2012, 2014 FIFA World Cup, UEFA Euro 2016 (2nd), 2018 FIFA World Cup (1st), UEFA Euro 2020, 2022 FIFA World Cup (2nd), UEFA Euro 2024	13 July 2019, friendly	St Patrick's Athletic 0–4 **Chelsea**
Kurt Zouma	France	UEFA Euro 2020	13 July 2019, friendly	St Patrick's Athletic 0–4 **Chelsea**
Emerson	Italy	UEFA Euro 2020 (1st)	13 July 2019, friendly	St Patrick's Athletic 0–4 **Chelsea**
Jorginho	Italy	UEFA Euro 2020 (1st)	13 July 2019, friendly	St Patrick's Athletic 0–4 **Chelsea**
Billy Gilmour	Scotland	UEFA Euro 2020, UEFA Euro 2024	13 July 2019, friendly	St Patrick's Athletic 0–4 **Chelsea**
César Azpilicueta	Spain	2012 Olympics, 2013 FIFA Confederations Cup (2nd), 2014 FIFA World Cup, UEFA Euro 2016, 2018 FIFA World Cup, UEFA Euro 2020 (4th), 2022 FIFA World Cup	13 July 2019, friendly	St Patrick's Athletic 0–4 **Chelsea**
Pedro	Spain	2010 FIFA World Cup (1st), UEFA Euro 2012 (1st), 2013 FIFA Confederations Cup (2nd), 2014 FIFA World Cup, UEFA Euro 2016	13 July 2019, friendly	St Patrick's Athletic 0–4 **Chelsea**
Alexander Fransson	Sweden	2016 Olympics	11 July 2019, UEFA Europa League	St Patrick's Athletic 0–2 **Norrköping**
Jordan Larsson	Sweden	UEFA Euro 2020	11 July 2019, UEFA Europa League	St Patrick's Athletic 0–2 **Norrköping**
Dante Leverock	Bermuda	2019 CONCACAF Gold Cup	19 April 2019, League of Ireland	St Patrick's Athletic 2–1 **Sligo Rovers**
Romeo Parkes	Jamaica	2015 Copa América	19 April 2019, League of Ireland	St Patrick's Athletic 2–1 **Sligo Rovers**
Federico Fernández	Argentina	2014 FIFA World Cup (2nd)	17 July 2018, friendly	St Patrick's Athletic 0–2 **Newcastle United**
Christian Atsu	Ghana	2013 African Cup of Nations (4th), 2014 FIFA World Cup, 2015 African Cup of Nations (2nd), 2017 Africa Cup of Nations (4th), 2019 Africa Cup of Nations	17 July 2018, friendly	St Patrick's Athletic 0–2 **Newcastle United**
Ciaran Clark	Republic of Ireland	UEFA Euro 2016	17 July 2018, friendly	St Patrick's Athletic 0–2 **Newcastle United**
Mohamed Diamé	Senegal	2012 African Cup of Nations, 2012 Olympics, 2017 Africa Cup of Nations	17 July 2018, friendly	St Patrick's Athletic 0–2 **Newcastle United**
DeAndre Yedlin	United States	2014 FIFA World Cup, 2015 CONCACAF Gold Cup (4th), 2016 Copa América (4th), 2022 FIFA World Cup, 2023 CONCACAF Gold Cup (4th)	17 July 2018, friendly	St Patrick's Athletic 0–2 **Newcastle United**
Kyle Lafferty	Northern Ireland	UEFA Euro 2016	5 July 2017, friendly	St Patrick's Athletic 1–0 **Heart of Midlothian**
Aaron Hughes	Northern Ireland	UEFA Euro 2016	5 July 2017, friendly	St Patrick's Athletic 1–0 **Heart of Midlothian**
Mohamed El Monir	Libya	2012 African Cup of Nations	21 July 2016, UEFA Europa League	St Patrick's Athletic 0–1 **Dinamo Minsk**
Jorginho	Guinea-Bissau	2019 Africa Cup of Nations, 2021 Africa Cup of Nations	29 July 2015, friendly	St Patrick's Athletic 3–2 **Manchester City**
Angus Gunn	Scotland	UEFA Euro 2024	29 July 2015, friendly	St Patrick's Athletic 3–2 **Manchester City**
Ayman Ben Mohamed	Tunisia	2019 Africa Cup of Nations (4th)	14 March 2014, League of Ireland	St Patrick's Athletic 3–2 **UCD**
Pascal Millien	Haiti	2013 CONCACAF Gold Cup, 2015 CONCACAF Gold Cup, 2016 Copa América	19 April 2013, League of Ireland	St Patrick's Athletic 2–0 **Sligo Rovers**
Roberto Lopes	Cape Verde	2021 Africa Cup of Nations, 2023 Africa Cup of Nations, 2026 FIFA World Cup	22 August 2011, League of Ireland	St Patrick's Athletic 1–1 **Bohemians**
Tony Mawejje	Uganda	2017 Africa Cup of Nations	7 July 2011, UEFA Europa League	St Patrick's Athletic 2–0 **ÍBV**
Ryan Thompson	Jamaica	2015 Copa América, 2015 CONCACAF Gold Cup (2nd), 2016 Copa América	25 April 2011, League of Ireland Cup	St Patrick's Athletic 1–1 (3–1 pens) **Shamrock Rovers**
Michael Hector	Jamaica	2015 Copa América, 2015 CONCACAF Gold Cup (2nd), 2016 Copa América, 2019 CONCACAF Gold Cup, 2021 CONCACAF Gold Cup	25 March 2011, League of Ireland	St Patrick's Athletic 3–2 **Dundalk**
Alan Mannus	Northern Ireland	UEFA Euro 2016	6 November 2009, League of Ireland	St Patrick's Athletic 1–0 **Shamrock Rovers**
Robbie Brady	Republic of Ireland	UEFA Euro 2016	6 September 2009, friendly	**Republic of Ireland U19** 2–0 Turkey U19
Oleg Ivanov	Russia	UEFA Euro 2008, UEFA Euro 2016	30 July 2009, UEFA Europa League	St Patrick's Athletic 1–0 **Krylia Sovetov**
Roman Shishkin	Russia	UEFA Euro 2016, 2017 FIFA Confederations Cup	30 July 2009, UEFA Europa League	St Patrick's Athletic 1–0 **Krylia Sovetov**
Jordi Cruyff	Netherlands	UEFA Euro 1996	16 July 2009, UEFA Europa League	St Patrick's Athletic 1–1 **Valletta**
James McClean	Republic of Ireland	UEFA Euro 2012, UEFA Euro 2016	7 April 2009, League of Ireland	St Patrick's Athletic 0–3 **Derry City**
Paulo Ferreira	Portugal	UEFA Euro 2004 (2nd), 2006 FIFA World Cup (4th), UEFA Euro 2008, 2010 FIFA World Cup	18 February 2009, friendly	St Patrick's Athletic 2–2 **Chelsea**
Niall McGinn	Northern Ireland	UEFA Euro 2016	10 November 2008, League of Ireland	St Patrick's Athletic 2–1 **Derry City**
Anders Svensson	Sweden	2002 FIFA World Cup, UEFA Euro 2004, 2006 FIFA World Cup, UEFA Euro 2008, UEFA Euro 2012	28 August 2008, UEFA Cup	St Patrick's Athletic 2–1 **Elfsborg**
Teddy Lučić	Sweden	1998 FIFA World Cup (3rd), UEFA Euro 2000, 2002 FIFA World Cup, UEFA Euro 2004, 2006 FIFA World Cup	28 August 2008, UEFA Cup	St Patrick's Athletic 2–1 **Elfsborg**
Johan Wiland	Sweden	UEFA Euro 2008, UEFA Euro 2012	28 August 2008, UEFA Cup	St Patrick's Athletic 2–1 **Elfsborg**
Emir Bajrami	Sweden	UEFA Euro 2012	28 August 2008, UEFA Cup	St Patrick's Athletic 2–1 **Elfsborg**
Séamus Coleman	Republic of Ireland	UEFA Euro 2016	24 August 2008, League of Ireland	St Patrick's Athletic 1–0 **Sligo Rovers**
Romauld Boco	Benin	2004 African Cup of Nations, 2008 African Cup of Nations, 2010 African Cup of Nations	7 March 2008, League of Ireland	St Patrick's Athletic 3–1 **Sligo Rovers**
Arkadiusz Głowacki	Poland	2002 FIFA World Cup	13 November 2007, friendly	St Patrick's Athletic 1–1 **Wisła Kraków**
Krzysztof Mączyński	Poland	UEFA Euro 2016	13 November 2007, friendly	St Patrick's Athletic 1–1 **Wisła Kraków**
Michael Thwaite	Australia	2007 AFC Asian Cup	13 November 2007, friendly	St Patrick's Athletic 1–1 **Wisła Kraków**
Christian Bolaños	Costa Rica	2005 CONCACAF Gold Cup, 2006 FIFA World Cup, 2007 CONCACAF Gold Cup, 2011 CONCACAF Gold Cup, 2014 FIFA World Cup, 2016 Copa América, 2018 FIFA World Cup, 2019 CONCACAF Gold Cup	19 July 2007, UEFA Cup	St Patrick's Athletic 0–0 **Odense Boldklub**
Arkadiusz Onyszko	Poland	1992 Olympics	19 July 2007, UEFA Cup	St Patrick's Athletic 0–0 **Odense Boldklub**
Robbie Keane	Republic of Ireland	2002 FIFA World Cup, UEFA Euro 2012, UEFA Euro 2016	12 July 2007, friendly	St Patrick's Athletic 0–1 **Tottenham Hotspur**
Gareth Bale	Wales	UEFA Euro 2016, UEFA Euro 2020, 2022 FIFA World Cup	12 July 2007, friendly	St Patrick's Athletic 0–1 **Tottenham Hotspur**
Jacques Maghoma	DR Congo	2017 Africa Cup of Nations, 2019 Africa Cup of Nations	12 July 2007, friendly	St Patrick's Athletic 0–1 **Tottenham Hotspur**
Adel Taarabt	Morocco	2012 African Cup of Nations	12 July 2007, friendly	St Patrick's Athletic 0–1 **Tottenham Hotspur**
Didier Zokora	Ivory Coast	2002 African Cup of Nations, 2006 African Cup of Nations (2nd), 2006 FIFA World Cup, 2008 African Cup of Nations (4th), 2010 African Cup of Nations, 2010 FIFA World Cup, 2012 African Cup of Nations (2nd), 2013 African Cup of Nations, 2014 FIFA World Cup	12 July 2007, friendly	St Patrick's Athletic 0–1 **Tottenham Hotspur**
Stephen Ward	Republic of Ireland	UEFA Euro 2012, UEFA Euro 2016	12 September 2004, League of Ireland	St Patrick's Athletic 1–2 **Bohemians**
Stephen Quinn	Republic of Ireland	UEFA Euro 2016	23 April 2004, League of Ireland	**St Patrick's Athletic** 1–2 Shamrock Rovers
Frank Sinclair	Jamaica	1998 CONCACAF Gold Cup (4th), 1998 FIFA World Cup, 2000 CONCACAF Gold Cup	13 February 2004, friendly	St Patrick's Athletic ?–? **Leicester City**
Steffen Freund	Germany	UEFA Euro 1996 (1st), 1998 FIFA World Cup	13 February 2004, friendly	St Patrick's Athletic ?–? **Leicester City**
Joseph N'Do	Cameroon	1998 FIFA World Cup, 2000 African Cup of Nations (1st), 2002 African Cup of Nations (1st), 2002 FIFA World Cup	2003, League of Ireland	**St Patrick's Athletic** ?–? ???
Kevin Doyle	Republic of Ireland	UEFA Euro 2012	2001, League of Ireland	**St Patrick's Athletic** ?–? ???
David Forde	Republic of Ireland	UEFA Euro 2012	1 December 2000, League of Ireland	St Patrick's Athletic 3–0 **Galway United**
Stig Inge Bjørnebye	Norway	1994 FIFA World Cup, 1998 FIFA World Cup, UEFA Euro 2000	5 August 2000, friendly	St Patrick's Athletic 0–2 **Blackburn Rovers**
Alan Kelly, Jr.	Republic of Ireland	1994 FIFA World Cup, 2002 FIFA World Cup	5 August 2000, friendly	St Patrick's Athletic 0–2 **Blackburn Rovers**
Damien Duff	Republic of Ireland	2002 FIFA World Cup, UEFA Euro 2012	5 August 2000, friendly	St Patrick's Athletic 0–2 **Blackburn Rovers**
Christian Dailly	Scotland	1998 FIFA World Cup	5 August 2000, friendly	St Patrick's Athletic 0–2 **Blackburn Rovers**
John Filan	Australia	1992 Olympics	5 August 2000, friendly	St Patrick's Athletic 0–2 **Blackburn Rovers**
Frank Lampard	England	UEFA Euro 2004, 2006 FIFA World Cup, 2010 FIFA World Cup, 2014 FIFA World Cup	23 July 2000, friendly	St Patrick's Athletic 0–1 **West Ham United**
Rio Ferdinand	England	1998 FIFA World Cup, 2002 FIFA World Cup, 2006 FIFA World Cup	23 July 2000, friendly	St Patrick's Athletic 0–1 **West Ham United**
Michael Carrick	England	2006 FIFA World Cup, 2010 FIFA World Cup	23 July 2000, friendly	St Patrick's Athletic 0–1 **West Ham United**
Trevor Sinclair	England	2002 FIFA World Cup	23 July 2000, friendly	St Patrick's Athletic 0–1 **West Ham United**
Michael Dawson	England	2010 FIFA World Cup	23 July 2000, friendly	St Patrick's Athletic 0–1 **West Ham United**
Frédéric Kanouté	Mali	2004 African Cup of Nations, 2008 African Cup of Nations, 2010 African Cup of Nations	23 July 2000, friendly	St Patrick's Athletic 0–1 **West Ham United**
Hayden Foxe	Australia	1996 Olympics, 2000 Olympics, 2001 FIFA Confederations Cup (3rd)	23 July 2000, friendly	St Patrick's Athletic 0–1 **West Ham United**
Dominic Iorfa	Nigeria	1988 Olympics, 1995 FIFA Confederations Cup	7 October 1999, League of Ireland	St Patrick's Athletic 1–0 **Waterford United**
Jeff Clarke	Canada	2000 CONCACAF Gold Cup (1st), 2001 FIFA Confederations Cup	2 October 1998, League of Ireland	**St Patrick's Athletic** 1–0 UCD
Heremaia Ngata	New Zealand	1998 OFC Nations Cup (1st), 1999 FIFA Confederations Cup, 2000 OFC Nations Cup (2nd)	18 September 1998, League of Ireland	St Patrick's Athletic 3–0 **Bohemians**
Raf de Gregorio	New Zealand	2000 OFC Nations Cup (2nd), 2002 OFC Nations Cup (1st), 2003 FIFA Confederations Cup, 2004 OFC Nations Cup (3rd)	18 September 1998, League of Ireland	St Patrick's Athletic 3–0 **Bohemians**
Billy Hamilton	Northern Ireland	1982 FIFA World Cup, 1986 FIFA World Cup	1984, League of Ireland	St Patrick's Athletic ?–? **Limerick**
Paul McGrath	Republic of Ireland	UEFA Euro 1988, 1990 FIFA World Cup, 1994 FIFA World Cup	30 August 1981, League of Ireland Cup	**St Patrick's Athletic** 1–0 Shamrock Rovers
Gordon Banks	England	1966 FIFA World Cup (1st), UEFA Euro 1968 (3rd), 1970 FIFA World Cup	2 October 1977, League of Ireland	**St Patrick's Athletic** 1–0 Shamrock Rovers
Jimmy Johnstone	Scotland	1974 FIFA World Cup	1977, League of Ireland	St Patrick's Athletic ?–? **Shelbourne**
Felix Healy	Northern Ireland	1982 FIFA World Cup	1974, League of Ireland	St Patrick's Athletic ?–? **Sligo Rovers**

== Gallery ==
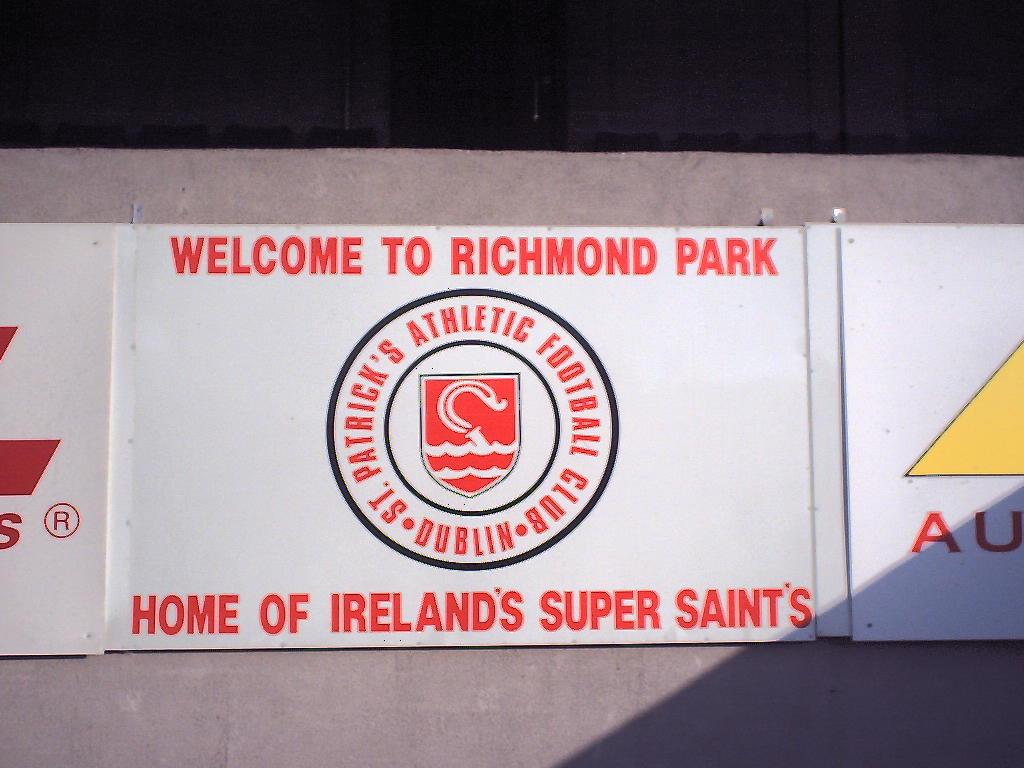
Welcome to Richmond Park signage

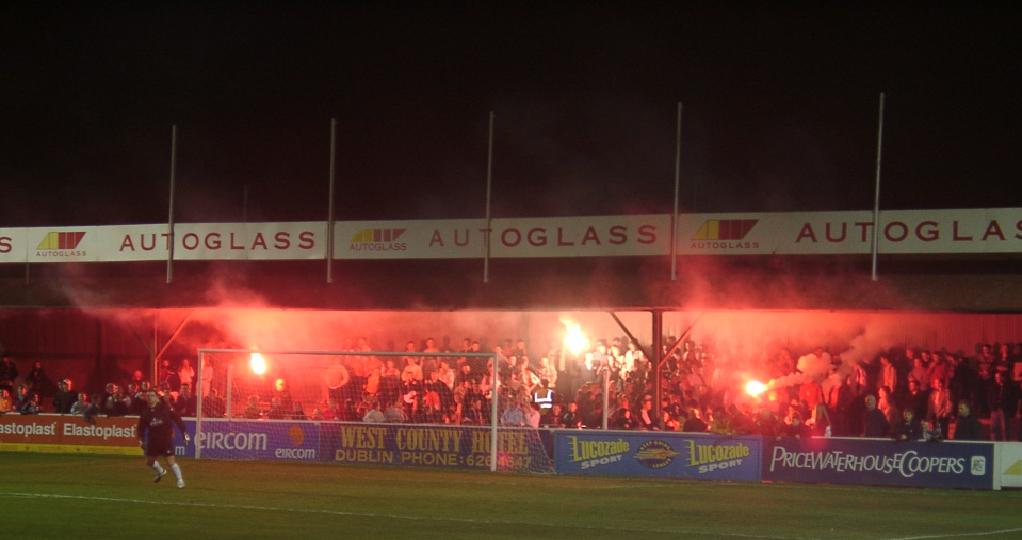
The Shed End

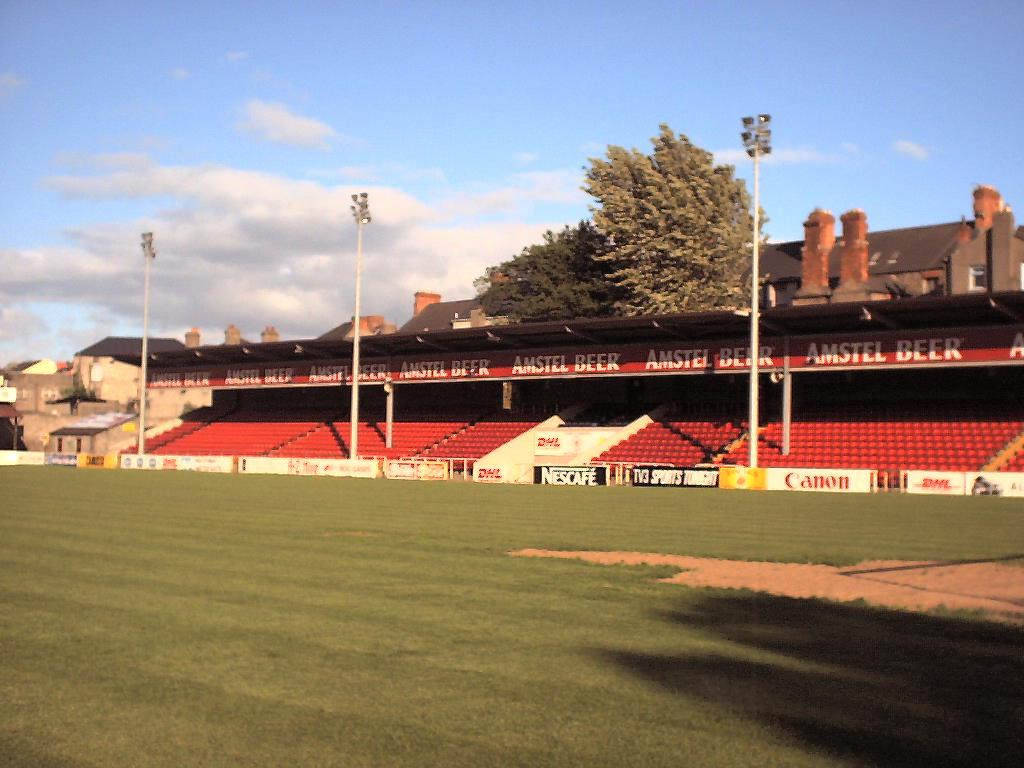
Richmond Park in the 1990s

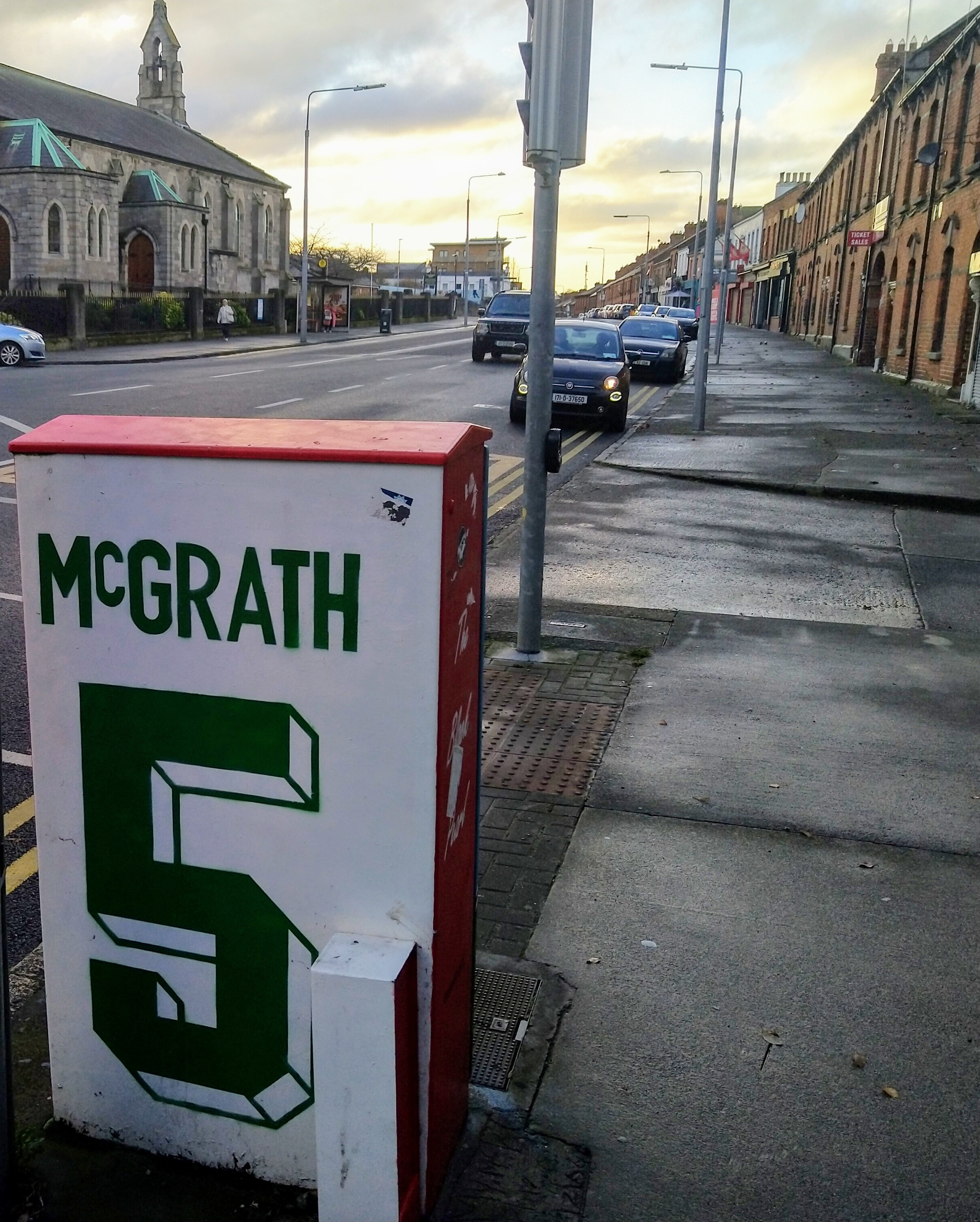
Street art dedicated to Paul McGrath outside the ground on Emmet Road
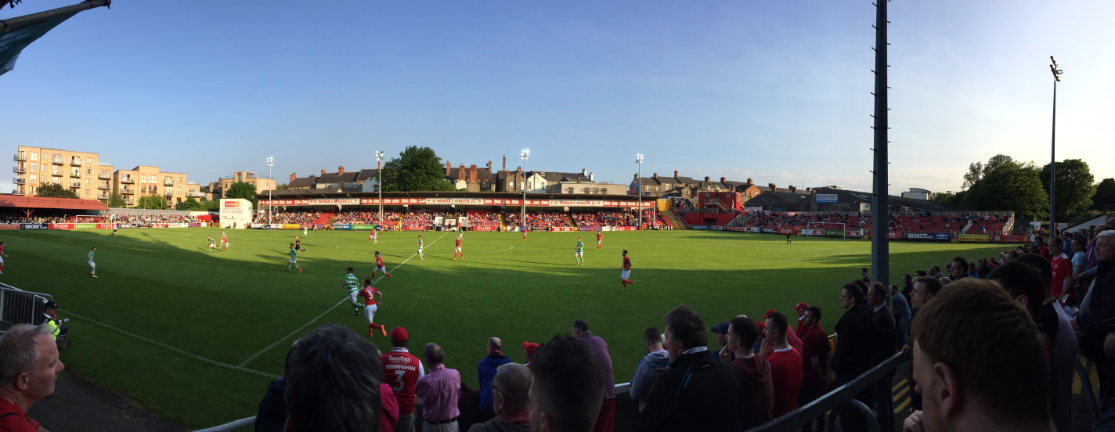
Richmond Park during St Patrick's Athletic vs Shamrock Rovers, 3 June 2016.
