= Richmond Arena (Dublin) =

- Location: Inchicore Dublin 8, Republic of Ireland
- Capacity: 12,000 (proposed)

Construction
- Built: No (proposal only)

Tenant
- St Patrick's Athletic (proposed)

The Richmond Arena was proposed to be built as a 12,000 seater association football stadium in Inchicore, Dublin, Ireland. The proposed developers suggested that the stadium could replace Richmond Park as the home stadium of St Patrick's Athletic FC. However, the site was not owned by the proposed developers, and the owner of the land, Dublin City Council, did agree to its sale or to the development, favouring the construction of new housing on the site instead. As of 2022, Dublin City Council had submitted a planning application for housing on the proposed site, and St Patrick's Athletic were seeking redevelopment of their existing stadium.

== Background ==
On 11 April 2018, St Patrick's Athletic football club announced plans for a proposed stadium, stating that a decision on the future of the St Michael's Estate site would be made by the landowners, Dublin City Council, in the succeeding months. The plans proposed a stadium on the first floor, with retail and leisure facilities at street level, and a car park underground. Club owner Garrett Kelleher is a property developer and led the clubs plans. In April 2018, club president Tom O'Mahony stated that the stadium would be financially independent, and if planning permission was confirmed that "you could conceivably have St Pat's playing in that stadium in 2022".

However, by April 2019, Dublin City Council had not approved planning permission, had not agreed to the sale or development of the proposed site, and an alternative government plan had been proposed to build housing on the site instead. An article, published in the Irish Independent in July 2019, suggested that the proposed plan had "not been given the go ahead" in favour of the construction of 500 homes on the public-owned site, and that representatives of the city council's housing department stated that the football club's proposal "was never a runner".

By late 2021, Dublin City Council was progressing its plans to develop "cost rental" and social housing on the former St Michael's Estate, and planning permission was submitted in 2022. Also in 2022, St Patrick's Athletic were reportedly planning to redevelop its existing stadium.
