= Paweł Krzeszowiak =

Polish footballer

Personal information
- Date of birth: 12 April 1974 (age 52)
- Place of birth: Maków Podhalański, Poland
- Height: 1.78 m (5 ft 10 in)
- Position: Forward

Senior career*
Years	Team	Apps	(Gls)
- Babia Góra Sucha Beskidzka
- Gwarek Zabrze
	Górnik Zabrze	0	(0)
	Beveren	0	(0)
1993–1994	Rot-Weiß Lüdenscheid		
1994–1996	Wuppertaler SV	1	(0)
1996–1997	GKS Tychy	11	(0)
1997	Górnik Zabrze	3	(0)
2006–2007	Babia Góra Sucha Beskidzka		
2007–2008	Tempo Białka		
2009–2011	Babia Góra Sucha Beskidzka		

International career
- Poland U16
Medal record
Representing Poland
Men's football
UEFA European Under-16 Championship
Third place	1990 East Germany
- * Club domestic league appearances and goals

Paweł Krzeszowiak (born 12 April 1974) is a Polish former professional footballer who played as a forward.

== Career ==
Krzeszowiak started his career with Polish lower league side Babia Góra Sucha Beskidzka. After that, he signed for Górnik Zabrze in the Polish top flight. After that, he signed for Belgian club Beveren. In 1993, Krzeszowiak joined German team Rot-Weiß Lüdenscheid. In 1996, he moved to GKS Tychy in the Polish top flight, where he made 11 league appearances and scored 0 goals. On 13 October 1996, Krzeszowiak made his debut for GKS during a 0–2 loss to Widzew Łódź. In 2006, he joined Polish fifth tier outfit Babia Góra Sucha Beskidzka. In 2007, he signed for Tempo Białka in the Polish seventh tier.

== Honours ==
Poland U16

- UEFA European Under-16 Championship third place: 1990
