= Arkadiusz Onyszko =

Polish footballer (born 1974)

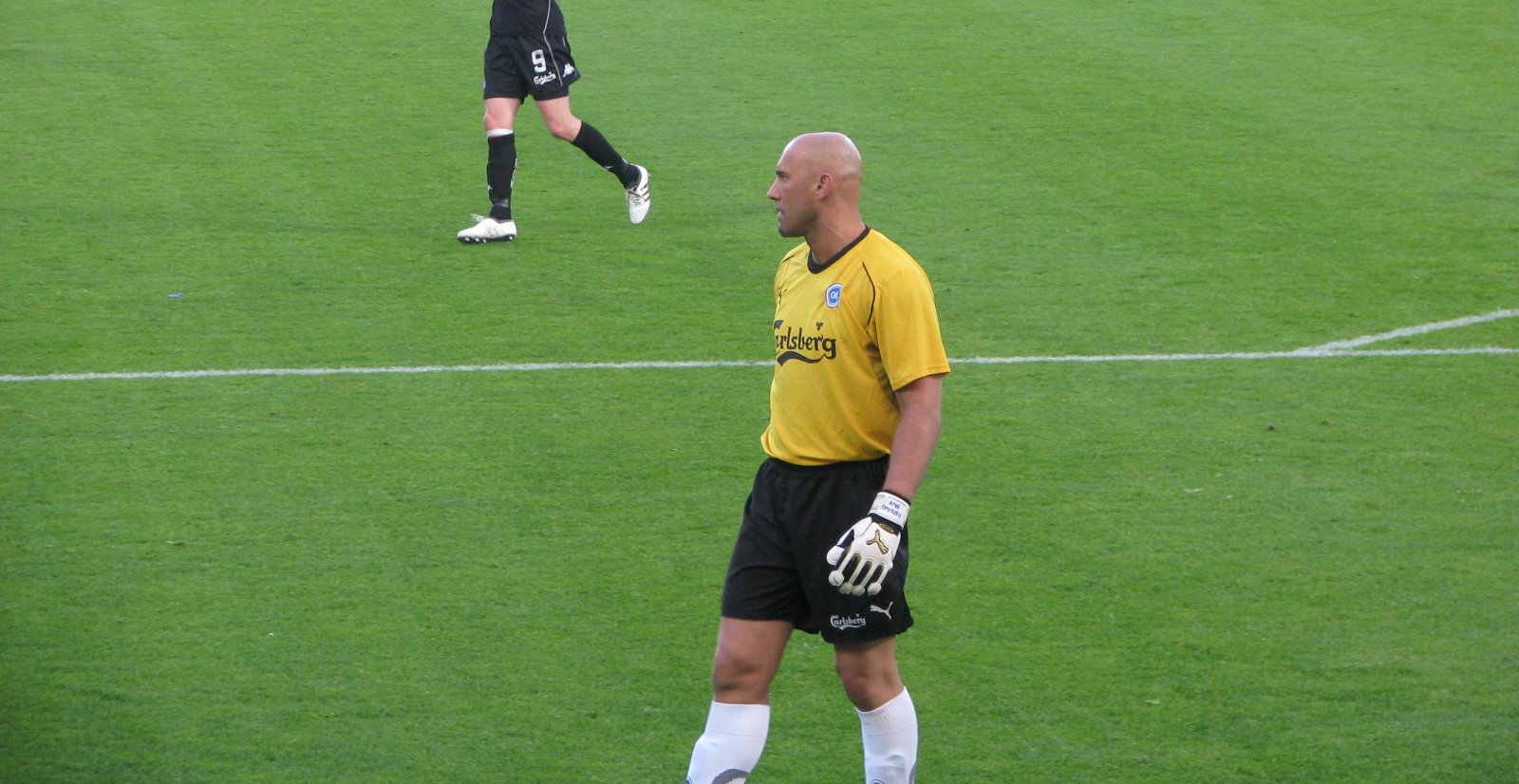

Personal information
- Full name: Arkadiusz Jerzy Onyszko
- Date of birth: 12 January 1974 (age 52)
- Place of birth: Lublin, Poland
- Height: 1.87 m (6 ft 2 in)
- Position: Goalkeeper

Team information
- Current team: Poland U21 (goalkeeping coach)

Senior career*
Years	Team	Apps	(Gls)
1989–1990	KS Lublinianka		
1990–1993	Zawisza Bydgoszcz	12	(0)
1993–1994	Legia Warsaw	0	(0)
1993–1994	→ Polonia Warsaw (loan)	13	(0)
1994–1996	Warta Poznań	25	(0)
1996–1997	Lech Poznań	31	(0)
1997–1998	Widzew Łódź	30	(0)
1998–2003	Viborg	173	(0)
2003–2009	OB	177	(0)
2009	Midtjylland	13	(0)
2010	Odra Wodzisław	13	(0)
2010–2011	Polonia Warsaw	0	(0)
Total		487	(0)

International career
- Poland U16
- Poland Olympic
1997	Poland	2	(0)
Medal record
Representing Poland
Men's football
Olympic Games
Silver medal – second place	1992 Barcelona	Team
UEFA European Under-16 Championship
Bronze medal – third place	1990 East Germany
- * Club domestic league appearances and goals

Arkadiusz Jerzy Onyszko (born 12 January 1974) is a Polish former professional footballer who played as a goalkeeper. He serves as the goalkeeping coach of the Poland U21 national team.

== Club career ==
Onyszko was born in Lublin. He began his career in 1989 with KS Lublinianka. In 1998, he moved to Viborg FF from Widzew Łódź, and established himself as Viborg's number one goalkeeper. In 2003, he was transferred to Odense Boldklub, where he spent the next six years as OB's first choice goalkeeper. Between 1998 and 2009, he played 363 games in the Danish Superliga, which makes him the fifth most capped player and the most capped foreigner.

After a turbulent time in Denmark, Onyszko returned to Poland and signed a short-term contract with Odra Wodzislaw on 13 January 2010. The club came last in the league this season and were relegated, but Onyszko's displays were impressive enough to earn him a two-year contract with Polonia Warsaw, which he signed in May 2010. However, in June 2010 Onyszko was diagnosed with kidney failure.

On 6 January 2013, Onyszko had a kidney transplant in Szczecin.

== International career ==
Onyszko was a member of the Poland national team that won the silver medal at the 1992 Summer Olympics in Barcelona, Spain.

== Controversies ==
In June 2009, Onyszko was convicted on charges of assaulting his former wife and sentenced to three months imprisonment, of which two months would be suspended. His club fired him the very same day.

A few days later, he signed a contract with Danish club FC Midtjylland. He was fired on 2 November after the release of his autobiography, which contained attacks on homosexuals and female sport reporters.

In his native Poland, he was criticised for his homophobic statements and for sparking anti-Polish sentiment.

== Honours ==
Legia Warsaw

- Polish Super Cup: 1994

Viborg

- Danish Cup: 1999–2000
- Danish Super Cup: 2000

Odense

- Danish Cup: 2006–07

Poland Olympic

- Olympic silver medal: 1992

Poland U16

- UEFA European Under-16 Championship third place: 1990
