= Piotr Haren =

Danish footballer (born 1970)

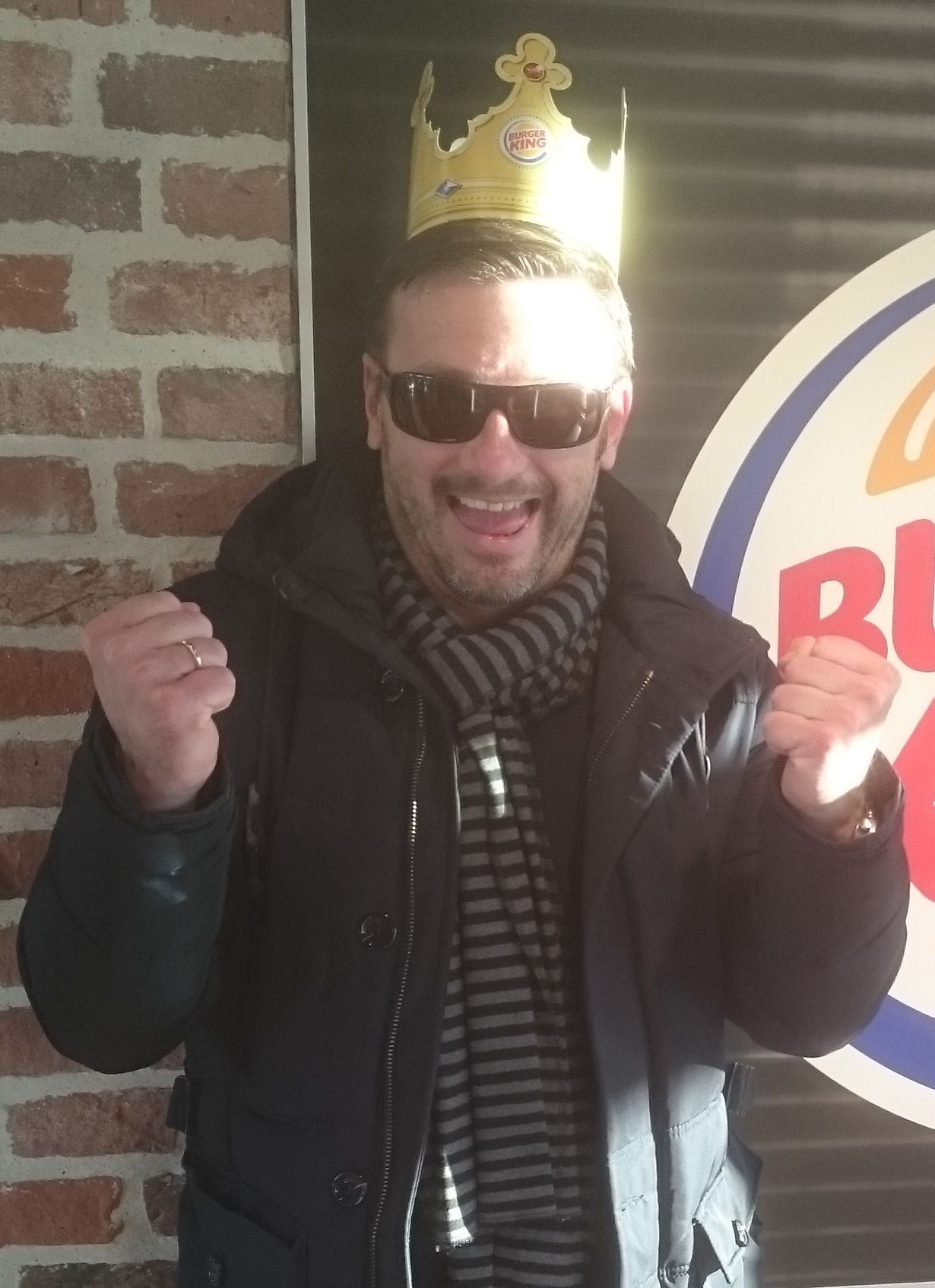

Personal information
- Full name: Piotr Robert Ravn-Haren
- Date of birth: 2 May 1970 (age 56)
- Place of birth: Łódź, Poland
- Height: 1.75 m (5 ft 9 in)
- Position: Right-back

Team information
- Current team: Lyngby (staff)

Youth career
- 1978–1984: B.93
- 1984–1989: KB

Senior career*
Years	Team	Apps	(Gls)
1989–1991	KB		
1992–1993	BK Frem	14	(2)
1993–1998	Lyngby	105	(9)
1998–2001	Copenhagen	51	(1)
2000	→ Apollon Limassol (loan)	0	(0)
2001	AGF	8	(0)

International career
1986–1988	Denmark U19	12	(3)
1990	Denmark U21	4	(0)

Managerial career
- 2015–2018: HIK (assistant)
- 2018: HIK (caretaker)
- * Club domestic league appearances and goals

Piotr Robert Ravn-Haren (born 2 May 1970) is a Danish former professional footballer who played as a right-back. He most notably represented BK Frem, Lyngby Boldklub and F.C. Copenhagen. Haren is of Polish descent.

== Career ==
Haren joined the KB as a 14-year-old in 1984, and made his breakthrough in the first team as a forward in 1989–91.

While at Lyngby Boldklub, where he signed in 1993, manager Benny Lennartsson made him into a right-back.

He joined Copenhagen in 1998, and made his debut for the club on 26 July 1998, starting in a 2–0 away win over Vejle Boldklub in the Danish Superliga. He fell out with an injury late in the first half, and was substituted by Morten Falch.

On 14 January 2019, Haren was hired to the staff of Lyngby Boldklub.

== Personal life ==
He is the son of Janusz Andrzej Haren, who represented Widzew Łódź and B.93.
