= Newroz Dogan =

Danish footballer (born 1979)

Personal information
- Date of birth: 9 September 1979 (age 47)
- Place of birth: Denmark
- Positions: Midfielder; forward

Senior career*
Years	Team	Apps	(Gls)
1997/1998	F.C. Copenhagen	1	(0)
- Kjøbenhavns Boldklub
-2007	Ølstykke FC		
2007/2008	Boldklubben af 1893		
-2010	Brönshöj Boldklub		
- * Club domestic league appearances and goals

Newroz Dogan (born 9 September 1979 in Denmark) is a Danish retired footballer.
