= Christian Clem =

Norwegian footballer (born 1973)

Personal information
- Full name: Christian Werring Clem
- Date of birth: 6 January 1973 (age 53)
- Place of birth: Copenhagen, Denmark
- Height: 1.77 m (5 ft 10 in)
- Position: Midfielder

Senior career*
Years	Team	Apps	(Gls)
1991–1993	Lyngby	14	(1)
1993–1994	Frem		
1994–1995	Fremad Amager		
1995–1997	Brøndby	3	(1)

International career
1992–1995	Norway U21	8	(2)
- * Club domestic league appearances and goals

Christian Werring Clem (born 6 January 1973) is a retired Norwegian football midfielder. His career was ended by an ankle injury when he was 22 years old.

He was capped 8 times for Norway u-21, but was born in Denmark and never played in Norway.
