= Amy Orben =

British experimental psychologist

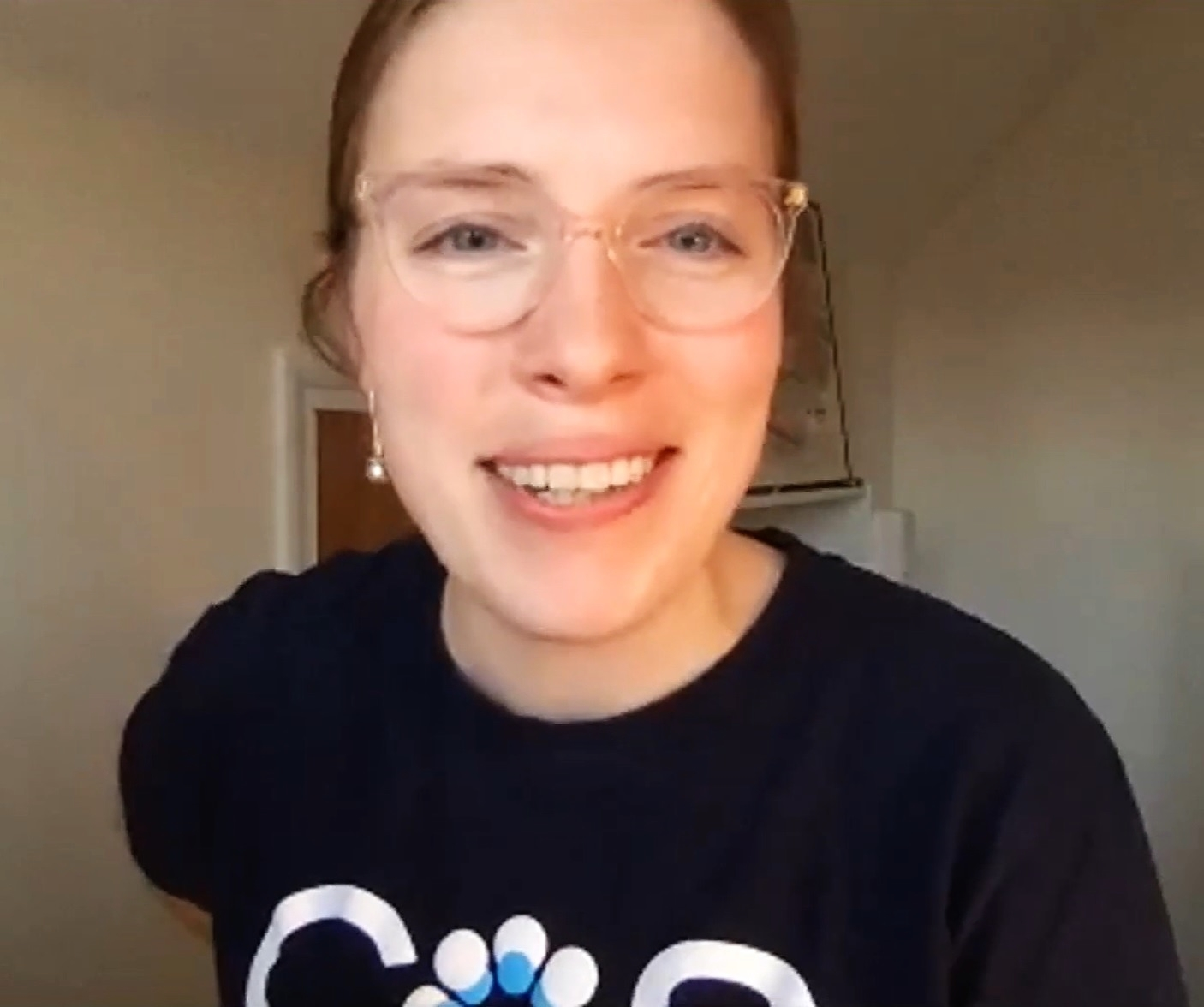
- Orben lectures for the University of Basel in 2020
- Education: University of Cambridge; University of Oxford
- Scientific career
- Workplaces: Emmanuel College, Cambridge; MRC Cognition and Brain Sciences Unit
- Thesis: Teens, screens and well-being : an improved approach. (2019)
- Website: Amy Orben

Amy Orben is a British experimental psychologist who is a group leader at the MRC Cognition and Brain Sciences Unit. Her research considers how digital technologies impact adolescent mental health. Orben was awarded the British Neuroscience Association Researcher Credibility Prize in 2021 and the inaugural Medical Research Council Impact Prize in 2023.

== Early life and education ==
Orben was an undergraduate student at the University of Cambridge where she studied natural sciences. She moved to The Queen's College, Oxford for graduate studies, where she specialised in experimental psychology. During her doctoral research, she was a visiting researcher at the University of Tübingen and Eindhoven University of Technology. After completing her doctorate Orben was made a Cambridge Research Fellow at Emmanuel College.

== Research and career ==
As a PhD student, Orben questioned the methods applied by Jean Twenge and others who had arrived at claims about the negative effects of technology and social media use. In 2021, Orben was appointed a programme leader at the MRC Cognition and Brain Sciences Unit. Her research considers novel methodologies to understand how screen time and use of social media impacts psychological well-being in adolescents. Post-millennial mental health (in particular stress, depression and anxiety) is reportedly worse than in previous generations, which is often attributed to social media. Orben showed that this wasn't the entire story: statistically speaking, eating a potato every day had a worse impact on well-being. She argued that social media can be helpful in times of anxiety and loneliness. Orben believes that significant quantities of high quality data about how children engage with technology could be provided by technology giants such as Google and Facebook.

Orben has criticised several of the methodologies currently being used, which largely rely on self-report methods and generate incorrect results. She is also an advocate for open science, and created ReproducibiliTea, an international journal club for researchers to discuss improving science.

== Awards and honours ==
- 2017 We Are The City Techwomen50 Award
- 2019 British Psychological Society Award for Outstanding Doctoral Research
- 2020 Society for the Improvement of Psychological Science Mission Award for ReproducibiliTea
- 2021 British Neuroscience Association Researcher Credibility Prize
- 2021 Nominee for the Association for Child and Adolescent Digital Innovation Award
- 2023 Medical Research Council Impact Prize

== Selected publications ==
- Orben, Amy; Przybylski, Andrew (2019). "The association between adolescent well-being and digital technology use". Nature Human Behaviour. 3 (2): 173–182. doi:10.1038/s41562-018-0506-1. PMID 30944443. Wikidata Q92830198.
- Amy Orben; Livia Tomova; Blakemore, Sarah (2020). "The effects of social deprivation on adolescent development and mental health". The Lancet Child & Adolescent Health. doi:10.1016/s2352-4642(20)30186-3. PMC 7292584. PMID 32540024. Wikidata Q96427197.
- Orben, Amy; Tobias Dienlin; Przybylski, Andrew (2019). "Social media's enduring effect on adolescent life satisfaction". Proceedings of the National Academy of Sciences of the United States of America. 116 (21): 10226–10228. doi:10.1073/pnas.1902058116. PMC 6534991. PMID 31061122. Wikidata Q91803322.
