= Michael Giolbas =

Danish footballer (born 1970)

Personal information
- Full name: Michael Giolbas
- Date of birth: 26 June 1970 (age 56)
- Place of birth: Denmark
- Height: 1.83 m (6 ft 0 in)
- Position: Midfielder

Senior career*
Years	Team	Apps	(Gls)
–1992	B 1903		
1992–1995	FC Copenhagen	67	(1)
1995–1997	Herfølge BK		
1997–2002	BK Frem	113	(1)
2002	KFUM Roskilde		
- * Club domestic league appearances and goals

Michael Giolbas (born 26 June 1970) is a Danish former football midfielder, who is known for having won the Danish championship with F.C. Copenhagen in 1993.

Giolbas started his professional career with B 1903, moving to F.C. Copenhagen upon its founding in 1992. After an intermezzo with Herfølge BK, Giolbas moved to minnows BK Frem, where he was soon elected captain, in 1997.

== Honours ==
Copenhagen

- Danish Super Cup: 1995
