= Jacek Chańko =

Polish footballer (born 1974)

Personal information
- Full name: Jacek Krzysztof Chańko
- Date of birth: 25 January 1974 (age 52)
- Place of birth: Białystok, Poland
- Height: 1.85 m (6 ft 1 in)
- Position: Defender

Senior career*
| Years | Team | Apps | (Gls) |
| 1991–1995 | Jagiellonia Białystok | 25+ | (1+) |
| 1996–1999 | Stomil Olsztyn | 99 | (10) |
| 1999–2000 | Werder Bremen | 0 | (0) |
| 2000–2001 | Pogoń Szczecin | 5 | (0) |
| 2001–2002 | Widzew Łódź | 5 | (0) |
| 2002–2003 | Stomil Olsztyn | 18 | (3) |
| 2003–2007 | Jagiellonia Białystok | 115 | (16) |
| 2008–2009 | Narew Choroszcz | | |
| 2009–2011 | BKS Jagiellonia Białystok | | |

International career
- Poland U16
| 1999 | Poland | 1 | (0) |
Medal record
Representing Poland
Men's football
UEFA European Under-16 Championship
| Third place | 1990 East Germany |
- * Club domestic league appearances and goals

Jacek Krzysztof Chańko (born 25 January 1974) is a Polish former professional footballer who played as a defender.

== Career ==
Chańko was born in Białystok, Poland.

In 1999, Chańko signed for Werder Bremen of the Bundesliga. In 2003, he stated that he regretted the move, because he did not play and could have signed for Legia Warsaw, the most successful club in Poland, where he could have been selected for the Poland national team.

After that, Chańko signed for Pogoń Szczecin, where he claimed there were many unfulfilled agreements and promises.

In February 2007, while a Jagiellonia Białystok player, Chańko was voted footballer of the year by readers of the Białystok-based newspaper Gazeta Współczesna, also placing third in the "10 most popular athletes in the Podlaskie Voivodeship" poll.

== Later life ==
In the 2006 local elections, Chańko won a seat on the Białystok council as a politician of the Civic Platform party. In 2007, he became the sporting director of his former club Jagiellonia Białystok. He was re-elected as a councillor in 2010.

In January 2014, he left the Civic Platform parliamentary group, co-founding Białystoczanie and suspending his membership in the Civic Platform, from which he was later expelled. Also in 2014, he successfully ran for re-election as a Law and Justice candidate.

In May 2017 Chańko as Białystok councillor suggested sounding alarm sirens in the city on Good Friday to commemorate the death of Christ.

== Honours ==
Poland U16

- UEFA European Under-16 Championship third place: 1990
