= Peter Vougt =

Swedish footballer

Personal information
- Date of birth: 12 January 1974 (age 52)
- Height: 1.85 m (6 ft 1 in)
- Position: Defender

Senior career*
Years	Team	Apps	(Gls)
1990–1994	IK Brage		
1994–1998	Halmstads BK		
1999–2000	VfB Leipzig		
2000–2004	BK Häcken		
2005–2007	Falkenbergs FF		
- * Club domestic league appearances and goals

Peter Vougt (born 12 January 1974) is a Swedish former professional footballer who played as a defender.
