= Jesper Ljung =

Swedish footballer and manager (born 1973)

Personal information
- Full name: Jesper Pierre Ljung
- Date of birth: 31 December 1973 (age 52)
- Place of birth: Malmö, Sweden
- Position: Midfielder

Youth career
- Ryssby IF

Senior career*
Years	Team	Apps	(Gls)
1989	Ljungby IF	3	(1)
1989–1991	Kalmar AIK	45	(13)
1992–1998	Helsingborgs IF	103	(13)
1998–2000	Vejle BK	39	(3)
2000–2003	Landskrona BoIS	72	(5)
2003	Raufoss IL	10	(3)
2004–2007	BK Häcken	85	(10)
Total		357	(48)

International career
1989–1991	Sweden U17	30	(14)
1993–1995	Sweden U21	15	(3)
1995	Sweden B	1	(0)

Managerial career
- Holmalunds IF
- 2010–2014: FC Trollhättan
- 2014–2016: GAIS (assistant)
- 2016–2021: BK Häcken (youth)
- 2022–: BK Häcken (assistant)
- * Club domestic league appearances and goals

Jesper Pierre Ljung (born 31 December 1973) is a Swedish football manager who currently serves as an assistant coach at BK Häcken. He is also a former professional footballer who played as a midfielder.

== Early life ==
Born in Malmö, Ljung grew up in Ryssby in Ljungby municipality and eventually started his footballing career with Kalmar AIK Fotboll and debuted in the second division at the age of 16.

== Club career ==
Considered one of the best prospects in Sweden at the time, he later chose to join Helsingborgs IF due to their home crowd despite interest from the most successful Swedish clubs. After injury in 1997 and surgery in 1998, Ljung signed for Danish side Vejle BK to replace Denmark international Thomas Gravesen, who left for Hamburger SV in the German top flight.

In 2003, he signed for Raufoss IL in the Norwegian second division.

== International career ==
Ljung won a total of 45 youth caps for the Sweden U17 and U21 teams, and appeared once for the Sweden B team in a friendly game against Scotland B.
