= Kofi Dakinah =

Danish footballer (born 1980)

Personal information
- Full name: Yari Kofi Kuranchi Dakinah
- Date of birth: 1 February 1980 (age 46)
- Place of birth: Copenhagen, Denmark
- Height: 6 ft 3 in (1.91 m)
- Position: Defender

Youth career
- 1985–1986: Fremad Valby
- 1986–1996: B.93
- 1996–1998: FC Copenhagen

Senior career*
Years	Team	Apps	(Gls)
1998–2000	FC Copenhagen	7	(1)
2003–2004	Herfølge	29	(0)
2004	Walsall	1	(0)
2004	Kidderminster Harriers	0	(0)
2004–2005	FC Nordsjælland	5	(0)
2006	Grindavík	3	(0)
2006–2009	Ølstykke		
2009–2010	B.93		
2010–2013	Skjold Birkerød		
2020	Værløse		

International career
1997–1999	Denmark U19	10	(1)
- * Club domestic league appearances and goals

Yari Kofi Kuranchi Dakinah (born 1 February 1980) is a Danish former professional footballer who played as a defender.

== Club career ==
Born in Copenhagen, Dakinah played professionally in Denmark for FC Copenhagen, Herfølge BK and FC Nordsjælland and in England for Walsall, Kidderminster Harriers.

He signed for Walsall on a free transfer in July 2004, before being released in November 2004. At Walsall, Dakinah made two first-team appearances - one in the Football League and one in the League Cup. After leaving Walsall, Dakinah played for the reserve team of Kidderminster Harriers.

In 2006, Dakinah signed with Icelandic club Grindavík, which became his final professional club. Afterwards, he played lower league football in Denmark with Ølstykke, B.93 and Skjold Birkerød. In April 2020, he made his comeback as a player as a 40-year-old, after having left Skjold Birkerød in 2013.

== International career ==
He earned ten caps for the Denmark U19 national team.

== Personal life ==
Dakinah also holds South African nationality. Both of Dakinah's parents are from Ghana.
