= Will Orben =

American soccer player

Personal information
- Date of birth: March 30, 1974 (age 52)

Youth career
- Lehigh University

Senior career*
Years	Team	Apps	(Gls)
1998	Hershey Wildcats		
1999–2001	FC Copenhagen	3	(0)
2000	→ Viborg FF (loan)	3	(0)
2001	Ølstykke FC		
2001	B.93		
2002	BK Skjold		
Total		6+	(0+)

Managerial career
- 2003–2012: Taft School
- 2012–: Phillips Andover
- * Club domestic league appearances and goals

Will Orben (born March 30, 1974) is an American former professional soccer player who played as a striker. He is head coach of Phillips Academy.

== Career ==
After playing for the Hershey Wildcats, Orben played in Denmark for FC Copenhagen, Viborg FF, Ølstykke FC, B.93 and BK Skjold.

After retiring as a player, Orben became a coach, and was in charge of Taft School starting in 2003. He is now head coach at Phillips Andover Academy.
