= Costa (footballer) =

Portuguese football coach and former player

Personal information
- Full name: João Carlos Rodrigues da Costa
- Date of birth: 18 November 1973 (age 52)
- Place of birth: Braga, Portugal
- Height: 1.76 m (5 ft 9 in)
- Position: Midfielder

Youth career
- 1984–1988: Braga
- 1988–1992: Porto

Senior career*
Years	Team	Apps	(Gls)
1992–1993	Nacional	14	(0)
1993–1994	Ovarense	28	(2)
1994–1996	Felgueiras	47	(1)
1996–1998	Porto	6	(1)
1998–1999	Vitória Guimarães	10	(1)
1999–2000	Rio Ave	18	(0)
2000–2004	Vitória Setúbal	53	(0)
2004–2005	Chaves	16	(0)
2005–2007	Trofense	33	(0)
2007–2008	Louletano	9	(0)
2008–2009	Merelinense	25	(3)

International career
1989–1990	Portugal U-16	29	(8)
1989–1991	Portugal U-17	13	(0)
1990–1992	Portugal U-18	11	(2)
1993	Portugal U-20	2	(0)
1993–1994	Portugal U-21	10	(0)

Managerial career
- 2009: Trofense (assistant)
- 2010: Merelinense (assistant)
- * Club domestic league appearances and goals

João Carlos Rodrigues da Costa (born 18 November 1973), known as Costa, is a Portuguese football coach and a former player.

== Club career ==
He made his Primeira Liga debut for Felgueiras on 20 August 1995 in a game against Chaves.

== Honours ==
=== Club ===
Porto

- Taça de Portugal: 1997–98

=== International ===
Portugal Under-16

- UEFA European Under-16 Championship: 1989
