= Mark Zimmermann =

German footballer

Personal information
- Date of birth: 1 March 1974 (age 52)
- Place of birth: Bad Salzungen, East Germany
- Height: 1.84 m (6 ft 0 in)
- Position: Striker

Team information
- Current team: Kickers Offenbach (head coach)

Youth career
- 1985–1988: Stahl Bad Salzungen
- 1988–1992: Carl Zeiss Jena

Senior career*
Years	Team	Apps	(Gls)
1992–1998	Carl Zeiss Jena	118	(44)
1998–2000	SpVgg Unterhaching	20	(2)
2000–2001	Stuttgarter Kickers	29	(4)
2001–2003	Alemannia Aachen	32	(1)
2003–2004	Sachsen Leipzig	23	(3)
2004–2008	Carl Zeiss Jena	59	(11)

Managerial career
- 2007–2008: Carl Zeiss Jena II (assistant)
- 2008: Carl Zeiss Jena (assistant)
- 2008: Carl Zeiss Jena (interim)
- 2008–2011: Carl Zeiss Jena (assistant)
- 2011–2016: Carl Zeiss Jena U19
- 2014: Carl Zeiss Jena (assistant)
- 2016–2018: Carl Zeiss Jena
- 2019–2023: 1. FC Köln II
- 2024–2025: Hallescher FC
- 2026–: Kickers Offenbach
- * Club domestic league appearances and goals

Mark Zimmermann (born 1 March 1974) is a German football coach and a former player who is the head coach of Kickers Offenbach.

== Career ==
From 19 to 25 September 2008, he was interim head coach in two matches (one win, one loss). The win was in the second round of the DFB-Pokal.

== Managerial statistics ==
As of 21 May 2018

Team	From	To	Record							
Team	From	To	G	W	D	L	GF	GA	GD	Win %
FC Carl Zeiss Jena (interim)	14 September 2008	27 September 2008	2	1	0	1	2	2	+0	50.00
FC Carl Zeiss Jena	1 July 2016	Present	83	43	16	24	137	102	+35	51.81
Total			85	44	16	25	139	105	+34	51.76

== Honours ==
Carl Zeiss Jena

- Promotion to the Regionalliga Nord in 2004–05
- Promotion to the 2. Bundesliga in 1994–95 and 2005–06

SpVgg Unterhaching

- Promotion to the Bundesliga: 1998–99
