= Zlatko Kostić =

Montenegrin footballer (born 1973)

Personal information
- Date of birth: 9 August 1973 (age 53)
- Place of birth: Titograd, SFR Yugoslavia
- Height: 1.76 m (5 ft 9 in)
- Position: Midfielder

Senior career*
Years	Team	Apps	(Gls)
1989–1995	Budućnost Podgorica		
1995–1997	Écija Balompié		
1997–1999	Budućnost Podgorica	40	(17)
1999	Panachaiki	9	(0)
2000–2003	Budućnost Podgorica		

Managerial career
- 2011: Bar
- * Club domestic league appearances and goals

Zlatko Kostić (Serbian Cyrillic: Златко Костић; born 9 August 1973) is a Montenegrin football manager and former player. A midfielder, he played for clubs in Yugoslavia, Spain and Greece.

== Playing career ==
Born in Titograd, Kostić began his career playing for local side FK Budućnost Podgorica. in 1995, he would join Spanish Segunda División side Écija Balompié for two seasons. The club were relegated to the Segunda División B following the 1996–97 season, and he returned to Budućnost Podgorica. In 1999, Kostić joined Super League Greece side Panachaiki for six months. He returned again to Budućnost Podgorica, where he would finish his playing career.

== Managerial career ==
After his playing career ended, Kostić became a football manager. He leads Montenegrin First League side OFK Bar.
