= Martin Čížek =

Czech footballer

Personal information
- Date of birth: 9 June 1974 (age 52)
- Place of birth: Vítkov, Czechoslovakia
- Height: 1.87 m (6 ft 2 in)
- Position: Midfielder

Youth career
- 1982–1984: TJ Dolní Lhota
- 1984–1991: Baník Ostrava

Senior career*
| Years | Team | Apps | (Gls) |
| 1991–1996 | Baník Ostrava | 103 | (22) |
| 1996–1998 | Sparta Prague | 53 | (9) |
| 1999–2000 | 1860 Munich | 33 | (0) |
| 2001–2002 | SpVgg Unterhaching | 24 | (3) |
| 2002–2006 | Baník Ostrava | 94 | (5) |
| Total | | 307 | (39) |

International career
| 1994–1996 | Czech Republic U21 | 13 | (4) |
| 1996–2000 | Czech Republic | 18 | (0) |
- * Club domestic league appearances and goals

Martin Čížek (born 9 June 1974) is a Czech former professional footballer who played as a midfielder. He spent three seasons in the Bundesliga with TSV 1860 Munich and SpVgg Unterhaching.

== Honours ==
Baník Ostrava

- Gambrinus liga: 2003–04
- Czech Cup: 2004–05
