= Morten Falch =

Danish footballer (born 1973)

Personal information
- Full name: Morten Falch Petersen
- Date of birth: 5 August 1973 (age 53)
- Place of birth: Copenhagen
- Position: Defender

Senior career*
Years	Team	Apps	(Gls)
1992–1999	FC København		
1999–2000	K.A.A. Gent		
2000–2001	Hvidovre IF		

International career
- Denmark u-21
- * Club domestic league appearances and goals

Morten Falch Petersen (born 5 August 1973) is a Danish retired football defender.

== Honours ==
FC Copenhagen

- Danish Cup: 1996–97
