= Poejo =

Portuguese football coach and former player

Personal information
- Full name: Paulo Fernando Estalagem Poejo
- Date of birth: 30 September 1973 (age 53)
- Place of birth: Lisbon, Portugal
- Height: 1.73 m (5 ft 8 in)
- Position: Midfielder

Youth career
- 1983–1987: CAC
- 1987–1992: Sporting

Senior career*
Years	Team	Apps	(Gls)
1992–1996	Sporting	13	(0)
1994–1995	→ União de Leiria (loan)	27	(2)
1995–1996	→ Estrela da Amadora (loan)	21	(0)
1996–1997	União de Leiria	23	(0)
1997–1999	Aves	49	(3)
1999–2001	Campomaiorense	54	(2)
2001–2004	Alverca	31	(0)
2004–2005	Olivais e Moscavide	12	(0)

International career
1989–1990	Portugal U-16	16	(7)
1991	Portugal U-17	9	(1)
1990–1992	Portugal U-18	16	(5)
1993	Portugal U-20	5	(0)
1994–1995	Portugal U-21	8	(1)

Managerial career
- 2008–2009: CAC (U-15)
- 2009: Torreense (assistant)
- 2010–2011: Real (U-17)
- 2011–2012: Real (U-19)
- 2012–2013: CAC (U-19)
- 2013–2015: Sporting (U-15 assistant)
- * Club domestic league appearances and goals

Paulo Fernando Estalagem Poejo (born 30 September 1973), known as Poejo, is a Portuguese football coach and a former player.

He played 8 seasons and 159 games in the Primeira Liga for Campomaiorense, União de Leiria, Estrela da Amadora, Alverca and Sporting.

== Club career ==
He made his Primeira Liga debut for Sporting on 30 December 1993 in a game against Marítimo.
