= Zdeněk Cieslar =

Czech footballer (born 1973)

Personal information
- Date of birth: 13 December 1973 (age 52)
- Place of birth: Czechoslovakia
- Position: Defender

Senior career*
Years	Team	Apps	(Gls)
1993–1994	Vítkovice	25	(0)
1994–1995	Boby Brno	8	(0)
- Třinec

International career
1993–1994	Czech Republic U21	3	(0)
- * Club domestic league appearances and goals

Zdeněk Cieslar (born 13 December 1973) is a Czech footballer who played as a defender. He made 33 appearances over two seasons in the Czech First League between 1993 and 1995. In the 1993–94 season, he received three red cards, still a league record in 2013. He later played in the second level for Třinec.
