= 1989 FIFA U-16 World Championship squads =

== Group A ==
=== Scotland ===
Head coach: (Scotland) Craig Brown

No.	Pos.	Player	Date of birth (age)	Caps	Club
1	GK	Jim Will	7 October 1972 (aged 16)		(England) Arsenal
2	DF	William Dolan	28 November 1972 (aged 16)		(Scotland) Celtic
3	MF	James Beattie	16 February 1973 (aged 16)		(Scotland) Celtic
4	DF	Edward Conville	2 April 1973 (aged 16)		(Scotland) Dundee United
5	DF	Kevin Bain	19 September 1972 (aged 16)		(Scotland) Dundee
6	MF	Gary Bollan	24 March 1973 (aged 16)		(Scotland) Dundee United
7	MF	Neil Murray	21 February 1973 (aged 16)		(Scotland) Rangers
8	MF	John Lindsay	17 March 1973 (aged 16)		(Scotland) Dundee United
9	FW	Craig Flanningan	11 February 1973 (aged 16)		(Scotland) Rangers
10	FW	Kevin McGoldrick	5 August 1973 (aged 15)		(Scotland) Greenock Morton
11	FW	Paul Dickov	1 November 1972 (aged 16)		(England) Arsenal
12	GK	Martin Dickson	23 July 1973 (aged 15)		(Scotland) Kilmarnock
13	MF	Brian O'Neil	6 September 1972 (aged 16)		(Scotland) Celtic
14	DF	Tom McMillan	8 August 1972 (aged 16)		(Scotland) Dundee United
15	MF	Ian Downie	16 November 1972 (aged 16)		(Scotland) Aberdeen
16	MF	Andy McLaren	5 June 1973 (aged 16)		(Scotland) Dundee United
17	MF	David Hagen	5 May 1973 (aged 16)		(Scotland) Rangers
18	DF	Scott Marshall	1 May 1973 (aged 16)		(England) Arsenal

=== hana ===
Head coach: (Brazil) Paulo Luís Campos

No.	Pos.	Player	Date of birth (age)	Caps	Club
1	GK	Anthony Mensah	31 October 1972 (aged 16)		(Ghana) Asante Kotoko
2	DF	Hope Sewlonu	29 October 1973 (aged 15)		(Ghana) Great Olympics
3	DF	Isaac Asare	1 September 1974 (aged 14)		(Ghana) Industrials
4	DF	Dramani Kalilu	21 October 1972 (aged 16)		(Ghana) Eleven Wise
5	DF	Baba Musah	4 September 1972 (aged 16)		(Ghana) Asante Kotoko
6	MF	Ibrahim Musah	3 November 1973 (aged 15)		(Ghana) Real Tamale United
7	FW	Yaw Preko	8 September 1974 (aged 14)		(Ghana) Power Lines
8	MF	Nii Lamptey	10 December 1974 (aged 14)		(Ghana) Young Corners
9	FW	Willie Brown	26 October 1974 (aged 14)		(Ghana) Ebusua Dwarfs
10	MF	Nana Opoku	31 August 1974 (aged 14)		(Ghana) United Stars
11	FW	Patrick Odoi	27 October 1974 (aged 14)		(Ghana) Zebi
12	GK	Kwaku Okere	30 October 1972 (aged 16)		(Ghana) Asante Kotoko
13	DF	Kofi Mbeah	11 December 1974 (aged 14)		(Ghana) Ebusua Dwarfs
14	DF	Emmanuel Asere	31 December 1973 (aged 15)		(Ghana) Okwahu Mount
15	FW	Bernard Aryee	23 April 1973 (aged 16)		(Ghana) Great Olympics
16	MF	Abdul Migima	5 December 1974 (aged 14)		(Ghana) Okwahu Stars
17	MF	Bright Adjei	1 November 1973 (aged 15)		(Ghana) Susubribi
18	GK	Charles Aryee	20 September 1973 (aged 15)		(Ghana) Iron Breakers

=== Cuba ===
Head coaches: (Cuba) Manuel Rodríguez

No.	Pos.	Player	Date of birth (age)	Caps	Club
1	GK	Alexis Revé	17 November 1972 (aged 16)		(Cuba) Villa Clara
2	DF	Jorge Ramos	7 January 1973 (aged 16)		(Cuba) Ciudad de la Habana
3	DF	Dibriestri Araque	26 November 1972 (aged 16)		(Cuba) Sancti Spíritus
4	DF	Dulieski Dickinson	17 January 1973 (aged 16)		(Cuba) Cienfuegos
5	DF	Pedro Martínez	26 February 1973 (aged 16)		(Cuba) Pinar del Río
6	MF	Pedro Baez	11 January 1973 (aged 16)		(Cuba) Matanzas
7	MF	Carlos Pérez	23 January 1973 (aged 16)		(Cuba) Sancti Spíritus
8	FW	Geosmany Zerguera	22 August 1973 (aged 15)		(Cuba) Sancti Spíritus
9	FW	Bernardo Rosette	23 October 1972 (aged 16)		(Cuba) Ciudad de la Habana
10	MF	Lázaro Monteagudo	17 January 1974 (aged 15)		(Cuba) Sancti Spíritus
11	FW	Alexis Forbe	11 October 1973 (aged 15)		(Cuba) Matanzas
12	DF	Addel Despaigne	4 August 1973 (aged 15)		(Cuba) Ciudad de la Habana
13	MF	Joel Fajardo	6 November 1972 (aged 16)		(Cuba) Villa Clara
14	MF	Ariel Álvarez	1 January 1973 (aged 16)		(Cuba) Villa Clara
15	DF	Alexander Valdés	29 August 1973 (aged 15)		(Cuba) Ciudad de la Habana
16	FW	Delvis Núñez	14 August 1972 (aged 16)		(Cuba) Villa Clara
17	FW	Armando Cruz	30 August 1973 (aged 15)		(Cuba) Camagüey
18	GK	Wolfgang Pérez	7 February 1973 (aged 16)		(Cuba) Ciudad de la Habana

=== Bahrain ===
Head coach: (Bahrain) Aziz Amin

No.	Pos.	Player	Date of birth (age)	Caps	Club
1	GK	Ali Hassan	16 August 1972 (aged 16)		(Bahrain) Al-Muharraq
2	DF	Sami Anbar	9 August 1973 (aged 15)		(Bahrain) East Riffa
3	DF	Ali Jawher	14 November 1973 (aged 15)		(Bahrain) West Riffa
4	DF	Ausama Isa	3 October 1972 (aged 16)		(Bahrain) Al-Muharraq
5	DF	Hassan Habib	29 December 1972 (aged 16)		(Bahrain) Al-Ahli
6	MF	Yusuf Ali	10 November 1972 (aged 16)		(Bahrain) Al-Wehda
7	MF	Abdullah Abdul Rahman	10 September 1972 (aged 16)		(Bahrain) Al-Ahli
8	MF	Ahmed Ebrahim	10 August 1973 (aged 15)		(Bahrain) Essa Town
9	FW	Hussain Ebrahim	15 November 1972 (aged 16)		(Bahrain) Al-Wehda
10	MF	Khaled Jasem	24 December 1973 (aged 15)		(Bahrain) East Riffa
11	FW	Mohamed Abdo	27 August 1972 (aged 16)		(Bahrain) Al-Ahli
12	MF	Talal Hassan	22 August 1972 (aged 16)		(Bahrain) East Riffa
13	FW	Younis Mansoor	2 August 1972 (aged 16)		(Bahrain) Al-Ahli
14	MF	Adel Hassan	25 August 1972 (aged 16)		(Bahrain) Al-Muharraq
15	FW	Faisal Abdul Aziz	8 June 1973 (aged 16)		(Bahrain) Al-Muharraq
16	DF	Mohamed Shalman	26 December 1972 (aged 16)		(Bahrain) Essa Town
17	DF	Fuad Jawher	22 September 1972 (aged 16)		(Bahrain) West Riffa
18	GK	Aref Jalil Aluraidh	13 October 1972 (aged 16)		(Bahrain) Al-Ahli

== Group B ==
=== East Germany ===
Head coach: (East Germany) Eberhard Vogel

No.	Pos.	Player	Date of birth (age)	Caps	Club
1	GK	Frank Rost	30 June 1973 (aged 15)		(East Germany) Lokomotive Leipzig
2	DF	Thomas Petzold	23 December 1972 (aged 16)		(East Germany) Union Berlin
3	DF	Sven Manke	13 April 1973 (aged 16)		(East Germany) BFC Dynamo
4	DF	Torsten Möhler	23 November 1972 (aged 16)		(East Germany) Chemie Leipzig
5	DF	Thomas Bleck	8 September 1973 (aged 15)		(East Germany) Vorwärts Frankfurt
6	DF	Rico Kauerhof	9 December 1972 (aged 16)		(East Germany) Lokomotive Leipzig
7	MF	Steffen Binke	17 September 1972 (aged 16)		(East Germany) Dynamo Dresden
8	MF	Sven Oldenburg	31 March 1973 (aged 16)		(East Germany) Hansa Rostock
9	MF	René Seib	20 September 1972 (aged 16)		(East Germany) Carl Zeiss Jena
10	FW	Frank Seifert	2 October 1972 (aged 16)		(East Germany) Dynamo Dresden
11	FW	René Rydlewicz	18 July 1973 (aged 15)		(East Germany) BFC Dynamo
12	MF	Marco Vogel	27 October 1972 (aged 16)		(East Germany) Vorwärts Frankfurt
13	FW	Toralf Konetzke	10 December 1972 (aged 16)		(East Germany) BFC Dynamo
14	MF	Daniel Knuth	15 November 1972 (aged 16)		(East Germany) Union Berlin
15	DF	Lars Kampf	26 October 1972 (aged 16)		(East Germany) Carl Zeiss Jena
16	GK	Jörg Lucke	29 December 1972 (aged 16)		(East Germany) Vorwärts Frankfurt
17	MF	Erik Schulz	11 August 1972 (aged 16)		(East Germany) Chemie Leipzig
18	FW	Klaus Hering	27 August 1972 (aged 16)		(East Germany) Vorwärts Frankfurt

=== Australia ===
Head coach: (Australia) Vic Dalgleish

No.	Pos.	Player	Date of birth (age)	Caps	Club
1	GK	Mark Schwarzer	6 October 1972 (aged 16)		(Australia) Marconi Stallions
2	MF	Shane Jarvis	27 April 1973 (aged 16)		(Australia) St. George
3	DF	Mark Babic	24 April 1973 (aged 16)		(Australia) St. George
4	DF	Tony Popovic	4 July 1973 (aged 15)		(Australia) Sydney Croatia
5	DF	Robert Stojcevski	1 January 1973 (aged 16)		(Australia) Altona Gate
6	MF	Edward Lees	21 October 1972 (aged 16)		(Australia) Blacktown City
7	MF	Willie Hastie	7 January 1972 (aged 17)		(Australia) Heidelberg United
8	MF	Matthew Dihm	19 October 1972 (aged 16)		(Australia) St. George
9	FW	Matthew Zec	30 March 1973 (aged 16)		(Australia) Sydney Croatia
10	FW	Vince Iacopetta	12 August 1972 (aged 16)		(Australia) Adelaide City
11	FW	Ross Aloisi	17 April 1973 (aged 16)		(Australia) Adelaide City
12	DF	Andrew French	14 October 1972 (aged 16)		(Australia) Sydney Croatia
13	MF	Jeff Suzor	20 November 1972 (aged 16)		(Australia) Marconi Stallions
14	MF	Giovanni Montesano	31 October 1972 (aged 16)		(Australia) Canterbury-Marrickville
15	DF	Anthony Pangallo	7 September 1972 (aged 16)		(Australia) Canberra Croatia
16	MF	Steve Corica	24 March 1973 (aged 16)		(Australia) Innisfail United
17	MF	Robert Spasevski	7 November 1972 (aged 16)		(Australia) Preston Makedonia
18	GK	Zeljko Kalac	16 December 1972 (aged 16)		(Australia) Sydney Croatia

=== United States ===
Head coach: (United States) Roy Rees

No.	Pos.	Player	Date of birth (age)	Caps	Club
1	GK	Chris Hightower	5 January 1973 (aged 16)		(United States) San Jose United
2	DF	Bill Heiser	13 January 1973 (aged 16)		(United States) Bethesda Sting
3	DF	Todd Haskins	30 August 1972 (aged 16)		(United States) Howard Courage
4	MF	Joel Russell	16 November 1972 (aged 16)		(United States) Varder III
5	MF	Rivers Guthrie	25 September 1972 (aged 16)		(United States) Junior Raiders
6	DF	John Cairel	11 December 1973 (aged 15)		(United States) Livermore SC
7	DF	Jorge Salcedo	27 September 1972 (aged 16)		(United States) Huntington Beach SC
8	MF	Claudio Reyna	20 July 1973 (aged 15)		(United States) Union County SC
9	MF	Billy Baumhoff	7 February 1973 (aged 16)		(United States) Scott Gallagher SC
10	MF	Nidal Baba	16 August 1972 (aged 16)		(United States) Thunderbirds SC
11	FW	David McGuire	7 September 1972 (aged 16)		(United States) Longhorns SC
12	FW	A. J. Wood	17 August 1973 (aged 15)		(United States) Bethesda United
13	MF	Imad Baba	15 March 1974 (aged 15)		(United States) Kline Texas
14	DF	Richard Wisdom	17 August 1972 (aged 16)		(United States) Brentwood SC
15	FW	Harry Weiss	28 May 1973 (aged 16)		(United States) Scott Gallagher SC
16	DF	Brian Bates	16 August 1972 (aged 16)		(United States) Prince William Spartans
17	FW	Steven Sietsema	16 January 1973 (aged 16)		(United States) Columbia Diplomats
18	GK	Brian Bailey	17 September 1972 (aged 16)		(United States) Howard Courage

=== Brazil ===
Head coach: (Brazil) Homero Cavalheiro

No.	Pos.	Player	Date of birth (age)	Caps	Club
1	GK	Helbert	25 September 1972 (aged 16)		(Brazil) XV de Jaú
2	DF	Ânderson	18 March 1973 (aged 16)		(Brazil) Juventus
3	DF	Lica	20 April 1973 (aged 16)		(Brazil) Internacional Limeira
4	DF	Andrei	21 February 1973 (aged 16)		(Brazil) XV de Jaú
5	MF	Carlos	1 August 1972 (aged 16)		(Brazil) Atlético Mineiro
6	DF	Biro	4 November 1973 (aged 15)		(Brazil) São Paulo
7	MF	Cléber	9 October 1972 (aged 16)		(Brazil) Vitória
8	MF	Régis	6 March 1973 (aged 16)		(Brazil) Flamengo
9	FW	Rudnei	14 November 1972 (aged 16)		(Brazil) Internacional
10	FW	Márcio	16 March 1973 (aged 16)		(Brazil) São Paulo
11	MF	Gilmar	2 April 1973 (aged 16)		(Brazil) Internacional
12	GK	Jorcey	24 August 1972 (aged 16)		(Brazil) Flamengo
13	DF	Weysler	8 August 1972 (aged 16)		(Brazil) América
14	MF	Fred	12 October 1972 (aged 16)		(Brazil) Palmeiras
15	FW	Gilberto	27 October 1973 (aged 15)		(Brazil) Vitória
16	FW	Serginho	27 May 1973 (aged 16)		(Brazil) Palmeiras
17	DF	Edson	8 February 1973 (aged 16)		(Brazil) Vasco da Gama
18	MF	Moises	10 January 1973 (aged 16)		(Brazil) Vasco da Gama

== Group C ==
=== Argentina ===
Head coach: (Argentina) Carlos Pachamé

No.	Pos.	Player	Date of birth (age)	Caps	Club
1	GK	Roberto Abbondanzieri	19 August 1972 (aged 16)		(Argentina) Rosario Central
2	DF	Jorge Asad	26 August 1972 (aged 16)		(Argentina) San Lorenzo
3	DF	Diego Castagno Suárez	10 October 1972 (aged 16)		(Argentina) Newell's Old Boys
4	DF	José Castro	13 December 1972 (aged 16)		(Argentina) Vélez Sársfield
5	FW	Gabriel D'Ascanio	6 August 1972 (aged 16)		(Argentina) Rosario Central
6	MF	Gabriel Alejandro Flores	13 December 1972 (aged 16)		(Argentina) San Lorenzo
7	MF	Sebastián Gordon	4 November 1972 (aged 16)		(Argentina) Boca Juniors
8	DF	Nestor Holweger	22 June 1973 (aged 15)		(Argentina) Boca Juniors
9	FW	Pablo Lavallén	7 September 1972 (aged 16)		(Argentina) River Plate
10	MF	Fernando López	4 March 1973 (aged 16)		(Argentina) Argentinos Juniors
11	DF	Luís Medero	24 January 1973 (aged 16)		(Argentina) Boca Juniors
12	GK	Leonardo Diaz	5 September 1972 (aged 16)		(Argentina) Newell's Old Boys
13	MF	Claudio Paris	31 March 1973 (aged 16)		(Argentina) Estudiantes de La Plata
14	MF	Walter Paz	4 March 1973 (aged 16)		(Argentina) Argentinos Juniors
15	MF	Luís Piccoli	28 November 1972 (aged 16)		(Argentina) Ferro Carril Oeste
16	FW	Pablo Rodríguez	6 December 1972 (aged 16)		(Argentina) Rosario Central
17	FW	Leonardo Selenzo	25 August 1972 (aged 16)		(Argentina) Rosario Central
18	DF	Gustavo Yzaurralde	11 June 1973 (aged 15)		(Argentina) River Plate

=== China ===
Head coach: (China) Zhu Guanghu

No.	Pos.	Player	Date of birth (age)	Caps	Club
1	GK	Fu Bin	22 August 1972 (aged 16)		(China) Hebei
2	DF	Xie Zhaoyang	11 November 1972 (aged 16)		(China) Beijing
3	FW	Ma Yanfeng	10 October 1972 (aged 16)		(China) Henan
4	MF	Wang Nong	1 August 1972 (aged 16)		(China) Dalian
5	DF	Li Qiang	25 October 1972 (aged 16)		(China) Beijing
6	DF	Jiang Feng	27 October 1972 (aged 16)		(China) Jilin
7	DF	Wang Guodong	10 September 1972 (aged 16)		(China) Qingdao
8	MF	Wei Qun	10 December 1972 (aged 16)		(China) Sichuan
9	FW	Gao Feng	1 December 1972 (aged 16)		(China) Beijing
10	MF	Jin Guang	29 September 1972 (aged 16)		(China) Heilongjiang
11	FW	You Shaodong	23 December 1972 (aged 16)		(China) Guangdong
12	GK	Wang Zhigang	27 September 1972 (aged 16)		(China) Shanghai
14	FW	Su Maozhen	30 July 1972 (aged 16)		(China) Shandong
15	DF	Wu Chongwen	25 August 1972 (aged 16)		(China) Guangdong
16	MF	Jin Yongzhu	8 November 1972 (aged 16)		(China) Jilin
17	MF	Liu Zhong	23 November 1972 (aged 16)		(China) Jiangsu
18	MF	Li Ming	26 September 1972 (aged 16)		(China) Dalian

- Only 17 players in China squad. (13) Xu Yang MF 06/06/1974 Bayi Football Team

=== Nigeria ===
Head coach: (Nigeria) Sebastian Broderick-Imasuen

No.	Pos.	Player	Date of birth (age)	Caps	Club
1	GK	Andrew Aikhuomogbe	20 December 1973 (aged 15)		(Nigeria) BBL Hawks
2	FW	Babajide Oguntunase	17 November 1973 (aged 15)		(Nigeria) National Bank
3	DF	Bobolayefa Edon	10 December 1972 (aged 16)		(Nigeria) Allied Bank
4	DF	Nura Muhammed	25 March 1973 (aged 16)		(Nigeria) B.O.N.
5	DF	Bala Boyi	30 September 1972 (aged 16)		(Nigeria) WRECA Kano
6	MF	Precious Monye	22 December 1974 (aged 14)		(Nigeria) Enyimba
7	FW	Kayode Keshiro	25 December 1972 (aged 16)		(Nigeria) Eko Holiday Inn
8	MF	Patrick Mancha	14 August 1973 (aged 15)		(Nigeria) JIB Rocks
9	MF	Sunny Umoru	29 November 1974 (aged 14)		(Nigeria) Bendel Insurance
10	MF	Olusegun Fetuga	27 December 1972 (aged 16)		(Nigeria) Ibukun-Oluwa
11	FW	Victor Ikpeba	12 June 1973 (aged 15)		(Nigeria) ACB Lagos
12	GK	Lemmy Isa	22 December 1972 (aged 16)		(Nigeria) El-Kanemi Warriors
13	DF	John Agum	22 August 1972 (aged 16)		(Nigeria) BCC Lions
14	MF	Aondofa Akosu	9 August 1973 (aged 15)		(Nigeria) BCC Lions
15	DF	Godwin Okpara	20 September 1972 (aged 16)		(Nigeria) Ibukun-Oluwa
16	DF	Chiedu Anazonwu	8 August 1972 (aged 16)		(Nigeria) Premier Breweries
17	FW	Benedict Akwuegbu	3 November 1974 (aged 14)		(Nigeria) Jos Highlanders
18	FW	John Saki	10 July 1973 (aged 15)		(Nigeria) BBL Hawks

=== Canada ===
Head coach: (Canada) Bert Goldberger

No.	Pos.	Player	Date of birth (age)	Caps	Club
1	GK	Jamie Engelfield	25 November 1973 (aged 15)		(Canada) Maple Leaf
2	DF	Chris Farmanis	9 April 1973 (aged 16)		(Canada) Maple Leaf
3	DF	Tom Kouzmanis	22 April 1973 (aged 16)		(Canada) Maple Leaf
4	DF	Anthony Primiani	4 October 1973 (aged 15)		(Canada) Laval
5	MF	Scott Macey	26 January 1973 (aged 16)		(Canada) North Shore
6	DF	Nico Berg	11 September 1973 (aged 15)		(Canada) North Shore
7	MF	Sam Grewal	1 August 1972 (aged 16)		(Canada) Woodbridge Rockets
8	MF	Massimo Caprio	9 December 1972 (aged 16)		(Canada) Bourassa SC
9	MF	Davor Cepo	8 January 1973 (aged 16)		(Canada) Saltfleet SC
10	MF	Kevin Degabrielle	18 November 1972 (aged 16)		(Canada) Woodbridge Rockets
11	FW	Angelo Donia	20 December 1972 (aged 16)		(Canada) Woodbridge Rockets
12	FW	Jason Gibbons	12 August 1972 (aged 16)		(Canada) Woodbridge Rockets
13	DF	Solomon Amoako	30 November 1972 (aged 16)		(Canada) Woodbridge Rockets
14	FW	Rick Curran	4 June 1973 (aged 16)		(Canada) Ottawa Intrepid
15	MF	Eric Puig	5 October 1972 (aged 16)		(Canada) Montreal River Sud
16	DF	Tom Perks	2 August 1972 (aged 16)		(Canada) Woodbridge Rockets
17	FW	Mauro Biello	8 August 1972 (aged 16)		(Canada) Montreal City
18	GK	Carmine Ciccarelli	30 December 1973 (aged 15)		(Canada) Saltfleet SC

== Group D ==
=== Guinea ===
Head coach: (Guinea) Nansoko Sadio

No.	Pos.	Player	Date of birth (age)	Caps	Club
1	GK	Kalil Camara	13 July 1975 (aged 13)		(Guinea) Lycée FC
2	DF	Seny Soumah	29 January 1973 (aged 16)		(Guinea) CFP Ratona
3	DF	Djibril Yattara	13 October 1972 (aged 16)		(Guinea) CFP Ratona
4	DF	Ibrahima Sylla	2 August 1973 (aged 15)		(Guinea) Lycée FC
5	DF	Mory Fofana	22 September 1973 (aged 15)		(Guinea) Collège Château d'Eau
6	MF	Ousmane Camara	26 May 1975 (aged 14)		(Guinea) Lycée Boulbinet
7	FW	Fode Camara	9 December 1973 (aged 15)		(Guinea) Lycée Gbession
8	MF	Mamadou Sylla	6 September 1972 (aged 16)		(Guinea) Lycée Donka
9	FW	Souleymane Oularé	16 October 1972 (aged 16)		(Guinea) Lycée Gbession
10	MF	Ousmane Soumah	19 November 1974 (aged 14)		(Guinea) Lycée 2 Octobre
11	FW	Moussa Sylla	9 February 1974 (aged 15)		(Guinea) Collège Donka
12	MF	Mohamed Keita	14 May 1973 (aged 16)		(Guinea) Lycée Donka
13	MF	Issiaga Fadiga	12 December 1972 (aged 16)		(Guinea) Lycée Coleah
14	FW	Raymond Camara	2 October 1974 (aged 14)		(Guinea) Lycée 28 Septembre
15	DF	Mamadou Bangoura	5 May 1973 (aged 16)		(Guinea) Lycée Donka
16	DF	Alseny Cissé	29 December 1975 (aged 13)		(Guinea) Collège Donka
17	MF	Amadou Keita	29 December 1975 (aged 13)		(Guinea) Collège Donka
18	GK	Morlaye Camara	15 March 1973 (aged 16)		(Guinea) Lycée Boulbinet

=== Colombia ===
Head coach: (Colombia) Dulio Miranda Mari

No.	Pos.	Player	Date of birth (age)	Caps	Club
1	GK	Leonidas de la Hoz	30 September 1972 (aged 16)		(Colombia) Atlético Junior
2	DF	Victor Patiño	21 August 1972 (aged 16)		(Colombia) De León
3	DF	Modesto Gaibao	9 September 1973 (aged 15)		(Colombia) Atlético Junior
4	DF	Omar Cañate	17 August 1973 (aged 15)		(Colombia) Atlético Junior
5	MF	Williams Fiorillo	12 April 1973 (aged 16)		(Colombia) Atlético Junior
6	DF	Douglas Molina	3 November 1972 (aged 16)		(Colombia) Atlético Junior
7	FW	Enrique Braydy	15 January 1973 (aged 16)		(Colombia) S Meta
8	MF	Alfredo Nieto	6 August 1972 (aged 16)		(Colombia) Atlético Junior
9	FW	Héctor Zapata	18 October 1972 (aged 16)		(Colombia) Comba
10	FW	Henry Zambrano	7 August 1973 (aged 15)		(Colombia) Independiente Medellín
11	MF	Edinson Chávez	4 February 1974 (aged 15)		(Colombia) Sarmiento Lora
12	GK	Luís Castro	1 November 1972 (aged 16)		(Colombia) Independiente Medellín
13	DF	Luís León	9 October 1972 (aged 16)		(Colombia) Inem
14	MF	John Raigoza	10 November 1972 (aged 16)		(Colombia) De León
15	MF	Juan Carlos Martínez	28 January 1973 (aged 16)		(Colombia) Sarmiento Lora
16	FW	Oswaldo Mackenzie	19 January 1973 (aged 16)		(Colombia) La Fortuna
17	DF	Carlos Moreno	26 November 1972 (aged 16)		(Colombia) Boca Juniors
18	MF	Víctor Pacheco	24 September 1974 (aged 14)		(Colombia) Atlético Junior

=== Saudi Arabia ===
Head coach: (Brazil) Ivo Wortmann

No.	Pos.	Player	Date of birth (age)	Caps	Club
1	GK	Khalid Al-Suwaileh	7 August 1972 (aged 16)		(Saudi Arabia) Al-Nassr
2	DF	Salman Al-Geraini	10 September 1972 (aged 16)		(Saudi Arabia) Al-Nassr
3	DF	Sulaiman Al-Reshoudi	3 September 1972 (aged 16)		(Saudi Arabia) Al-Taawon
4	DF	Adnan Abdulshkor	11 August 1972 (aged 16)		(Saudi Arabia) Al-Wehda
5	DF	Abdullah Al-Ahmadi	14 August 1972 (aged 16)		(Saudi Arabia) Al-Ittihad
6	MF	Fuad Anwar	13 October 1972 (aged 16)		(Saudi Arabia) Al-Shabab
7	DF	Aref Burshaid	29 August 1972 (aged 16)		(Saudi Arabia) Al-Qadsiah
8	MF	Abdullah Al-Hamdi	18 August 1972 (aged 16)		(Saudi Arabia) Al-Hajar
9	FW	Khalid Al-Roaihi	15 December 1972 (aged 16)		(Saudi Arabia) Al-Ahli
10	MF	Saud Al-Hammali	19 October 1972 (aged 16)		(Saudi Arabia) Al-Nassr
11	FW	Mansour Al-Mousa	29 October 1972 (aged 16)		(Saudi Arabia) Al-Najmeh
12	MF	Jabarti Al-Shamrani	29 November 1972 (aged 16)		(Saudi Arabia) Al-Ittihad
13	FW	Waleed Al-Terair	23 November 1972 (aged 16)		(Saudi Arabia) Al-Nassr
14	MF	Salem Al-Alawi	21 August 1972 (aged 16)		(Saudi Arabia) Al-Shabab
15	MF	Mohammed Al-Temyat	24 October 1972 (aged 16)		(Saudi Arabia) Al-Hilal
16	DF	Abdullah Al-Theneyan	8 October 1972 (aged 16)		(Saudi Arabia) Al-Nassr
17	GK	Mohamed Al-Deayea	2 August 1972 (aged 16)		(Saudi Arabia) Al-Ta'ee
18	GK	Shaker Al-Shujaa	2 August 1972 (aged 16)		(Saudi Arabia) Al-Nassr

=== Portugal ===
Head coach: (Portugal) Carlos Queiroz

No.	Pos.	Player	Date of birth (age)	Caps	Club
1	GK	Paulo Santos	11 December 1972 (aged 16)		(Portugal) Sporting CP
2	FW	Gil Gomes	2 December 1972 (aged 16)		(Portugal) Benfica
3	DF	Emílio Peixe	16 January 1973 (aged 16)		(Portugal) Sporting CP
4	MF	Luís Figo	4 November 1972 (aged 16)		(Portugal) Sporting CP
5	MF	Costa	18 November 1973 (aged 15)		(Portugal) Porto
6	FW	Fernando Peres	4 September 1972 (aged 16)		(Portugal) Sporting CP
7	MF	Sergio Lourenço	22 September 1972 (aged 16)		(Portugal) Sporting CP
8	MF	Canana	21 October 1972 (aged 16)		(Portugal) Porto
9	DF	Geani	2 January 1973 (aged 16)		(Portugal) Vitória de Guimarães
10	MF	Rui Capucho	11 March 1973 (aged 16)		(Portugal) Estrela da Amadora
11	MF	Bino	19 December 1972 (aged 16)		(Portugal) Porto
12	GK	Nuno Fonseca	20 January 1973 (aged 16)		(Portugal) Porto
13	FW	Miguel Simão	26 February 1973 (aged 16)		(Portugal) Boavista
14	DF	Rui Ferreira	29 March 1973 (aged 16)		(Portugal) Benfica
15	DF	Adalberto	17 June 1973 (aged 15)		(Portugal) Boavista
16	FW	Tulipa	6 December 1972 (aged 16)		(Portugal) Porto
17	DF	Abel Xavier	30 November 1972 (aged 16)		(Portugal) Estrela da Amadora
18	DF	Álvaro Magalhães	25 August 1972 (aged 16)		(Portugal) Porto
