= 2005 FIFA Beach Soccer World Cup squads =

International beach soccer tournament in Brazil

The 2005 FIFA Beach Soccer World Cup was an international beach soccer tournament held in Rio de Janeiro, Brazil from 8 May until 15 May 2005. The 12 national teams involved in the tournament were required to register a squad of 12 players; only players in these squads were eligible to take part in the tournament.

== Group A ==
=== Brazil ===
Head coach: (Brazil) Indio

No.	Pos.	Player	Date of birth (age)	Caps	Club
1	GK	Robertinho	21 August 1969 (aged 35)		
2	DF	Betinho	16 December 1977 (aged 27)		
4	DF	Chumbinho	27 September 1971 (aged 33)		
5	DF	Juninho	20 September 1973 (aged 31)		
6	FW	Bruno Malias	29 March 1980 (aged 25)		
7	FW	Nenem	5 February 1973 (aged 32)		
8	DF	Junior Negao	29 March 1964 (aged 41)		
9	FW	Benjamin	29 May 1969 (aged 35)		
10	FW	Jorginho	19 October 1974 (aged 30)		
11	FW	Romário	29 January 1966 (aged 39)		
12	DF	Buru	14 April 1976 (aged 29)		
13	GK	Pierre	12 July 1974 (aged 30)		

=== Spain ===
Head coach: (Spain) Joaquín Alonso

No.	Pos.	Player	Date of birth (age)	Caps	Club
1	GK	Roberto Valeiro	26 September 1974 (aged 30)		
2	GK	Antonio Parejo Camacho	10 August 1981 (aged 23)		
3	DF	Alfonso Castro Fernandez	3 April 1980 (aged 25)		
4	DF	Juan Manuel Martin Lima	6 August 1979		
5	FW	Nicolas Alvarado Caporale	24 July 1976		
6	DF	Eloy Souto Barreiro	2 September 1978		
7	DF	Manuel Ruben Bustillo	17 January 1981		
8	FW	Alejandro Tejada Pedraza	4 November 1983		
9	DF	Samuel Vazquez	23 September 1974		
10	FW	David Cordon Cano	10 September 1975		
11	FW	Ramiro Figueiras Amarelle	17 December 1977		
12	FW	Julio Salinas	11 September 1962		

=== Thailand ===
Head coach : (Brazil) Marcelo Martins

No.	Pos.	Player	Date of birth (age)	Caps	Club
1	GK	Vilard Normcharoen	14 July 1962 (aged 42)		{{{club}}}
2	GK	Intharat Apinyakool	30 May 1982 (aged 22)		{{{club}}}
3	DF	Yutthana Polsak	21 March 1970 (aged 35)		{{{club}}}
4	DF	Pongsak Khongkaew	13 January 1977 (aged 28)		{{{club}}}
5	DF	Anupong Polasak	20 May 1973 (aged 31)		{{{club}}}
6	DF	Kay Langkawong	21 December 1980 (aged 24)		{{{club}}}
7	DF	Montree Praepun	18 January 1973 (aged 31)		{{{club}}}
8	FW	Thanee Ruangsri	5 August 1982 (aged 22)		{{{club}}}
9	FW	Sanpetch Kaewchuay	2 August 1986 (aged 18)		{{{club}}}
10	FW	Senea Langkaew	26 October 1968 (aged 36)		{{{club}}}
11	FW	Pitipong Kuldilok	8 February 1980 (aged 25)		{{{club}}}
12	FW	Vachiraphan Makmee	5 June 1982 (aged 21)		{{{club}}}

== Group B ==
=== Japan ===
Head coach: (Brazil) (Japan) Ruy Ramos

No.	Pos.	Player	Date of birth (age)	Caps	Club
1	GK	Eiichi Kato	9 September 1971 (aged 33)		
2	GK	Kazuhiro Ogawa	3 April 1977		
3	DF	Naoya Oshiro	26 September 1981		
4	DF	Katsuhiro Yoshii	25 September 1973		
5	DF	Takashi Arakaki	26 May 1979		
6	DF	Tadaomi Nakamura	20 April 1975		
7	DF	Shinji Makino	29 May 1976		
8	DF	Naoyuki Kuroki	25 July 1978		
9	FW	Kiyokazu Takara	8 October 1973		
10	FW	Masahito Toma	16 March 1981		
11	FW	Takeshi Kawaharazuka	1 February 1975		
12		Kunihiro Wakabayashi			

=== Portugal ===
Head coach: Jose Miguel Mateus

No.	Pos.	Player	Date of birth (age)	Caps	Club
1	GK	Bruno Manuel de Jesus M. Silva	20		
2	GK	Sergio Freitas Coelho	31		
3	DF	Hernani Madruga Neves	41		
4	DF	Pedro Jorge Barbosa	37		
5	FW	Alan Cavalcanti	29		
6	FW	João Antonio Gomes Marques	33		
7	DF	Nathaniel Bole	25		
8	FW	Madjer	22 January 1977		
9	DF	Mario Duarte	32		
10	FW	José Barraca	33		
11	FW	Nuno Belchior	22		
12	FW	Tiago Filipe da Costa Oliveira	22		

=== United States ===
- Head coach: Roberto Ceciliano
- Assistant Coach: Chris Antonopoulos

No.	Pos.	Player	Date of birth (age)	Caps	Club
1	GK	Pierre Cazassus	25 September 1969		
2	GK	Daryl Fischer	14 March 1975		
3	DF	Philip Gyau	7 February 1966		
4	DF	Benyam Astorga	14 May 1972		
5	DF	Joshua Hill	2 July 1981		
6	DF	Eduardo Testa	19 August 1978		
7	DF	Ryan Gillespie	8 April 1972		
8	DF	Todd Haskins	30 August 1972		
9	FW	Raphael Xexeo	30 October 1979		
10	FW	Christian Braga	15 July 1977		
11	FW	Francis Farberoff	16 March 1975		
12	FW	Carlos Lima	18 June 1970		

== Group C ==
=== South Africa ===
Head coach: Shezi Lindani

No.	Pos.	Player	Date of birth (age)	Caps	Club
1	GK	Fraser Jovan	9 February 1987		
2	GK	Madonsela Nkosinathi	25 December 1988		
3	DF	Dicks Darren	22 August 1988		
4	DF	Ndlovu Simphiwe	22 October 1989		
5	DF	Nzimande Lucky	28 October 1986		
6	FW	Francisco Ricardo	29 December 1988		
7	DF	Mfunda Sinethemba	12 December 1983		
8	DF	Mjoli Zolile	30 August 1985		
9	FW	Mthembu Bheki	1 June 1986		
10	FW	Ntwanambi Stanley	17 July 1982		
11	FW	Gumede Philani	16 October 1979		
12	FW	Gcememe Sticks	10 June 1986		

=== Ukraine ===
Head coach: (Ukraine) Viktor Moroz

No.	Pos.	Player	Date of birth (age)	Caps	Club
1	GK	Vladislav Lysenko	13 August 1979		
2	GK	Vitaliy Sydorenko	22 December 1981		
3	DF	Viktor Moroz	18 January 1968		
4	FW	Dmytro Koryenyev	7 October 1970		
5	DF	Oleksandr Pylypenko	17 May 1974		
6	DF	Vitaliy Pavlenko	14 January 1976		
7	DF	Sergiy Bozhenko	11 June 1979		
8	FW	Victor Ulianytskyi	7 August 1972		
9	DF	Vitaliy Khorun	9 September 1982		
10	FW	Yevgen Varenytsya	15 May 1975		
11	DF	Kirilo Kycher	9 August 1983		
12	DF	Oleksandr Shyshkov	19 May 1980		

=== Uruguay ===
Head coach: Enrique Belo & Gustavo Sanchez

No.	Pos.	Player	Date of birth (age)	Caps	Club
1	GK	Diego Monserrat	31 May 1972		
2	GK	Leandro Ortiz	20 September 1975		
3		Alejandro Figueredo			
4	DF	Sebastián Castro	22 November 1978		
5	FW	Ricardo Martinez	5 June 1982		
6	DF	Sarandí Sobral	31 March 1978		
7	DF	Jorge Sena	15 December 1980		
8	FW	Germán Parrillo	10 March 1975		
9	DF	Martín Diaz	23 November 1979		
10	FW	Nicolás Moliterno	2 February 1971		
11	FW	Fabián Canaveris	4 March 1975		
12	DF	Gustavo Poyet	15 November 1967		

== Group D ==
=== Argentina ===
Head coach: Marcelo Suarez Bidondo

No.	Pos.	Player	Date of birth (age)	Caps	Club
1	GK	Marcelo Salgueiro	28 July 1976		
2	GK	Cesar Mendoza	10 March 1983		
3	DF	Gustavo Casado	7 December 1973		
4	DF	Francisco Petrasso	9 August 1970		
5	DF	Santiago Lopez Hilaire	25 May 1981		
6	DF	Rodrigo Lopez	8 June 1977		
7	FW	Adrian Corrales	11 October 1981		
8	DF	Leandro Paradisi	9 July 1975		
9	FW	Federico Andrade	10 February 1977		
10	FW	Alberto Acosta	28 August 1966		
11	FW	Ezequiel Lopez Hilaire	10 August 1979		
12	FW	Federico Lopez Hilaire	20 June 1984		

=== Australia ===
Head coach: Adrian Santrac

No.	Pos.	Player	Date of birth (age)	Caps	Club
1	GK	Andrew Crews	18 August 1973		
2	DF	Tayfun Devrimol	22 April 1980		
3	DF	Vuko Tomasevic	13 May 1980		
4	DF	George Souris	12 November 1969		
5	MF	Darren McDonald	1 March 1976		
6	MF	Steve Karavatakis	17 June 1970		
7	FW	Demetrios Bakis	8 July 1979		
8	MF	Leo Carle	6 June 1980		
9	MF	Erick Anabalon	4 July 1982		
10	FW	John Buonavoglia	19 October 1975		
11	FW	Brad Heffernan	6 April 1981		
12	GK	Anastatios Alogdellis	7 June 1978		

=== France ===
Head coach: (France) Eric Cantona

No.	Pos.	Player	Date of birth (age)	Caps	Club
1	GK	Jean-Marie Aubry	3 April 1969 (aged 36)		
22	GK	Johan Nicodemi	18 June 1981 (aged 23)		
3	DF	Thierry Ottavy			
4	DF	Stéphane Francois	11 April 1976		
5	DF	Sébastien Sansoni	30 January 1978		
6	DF	Jean-Marc Edouard	5 June 1973		
7	DF	Anthony Mendy			
8	FW	Didier Samoun	29 August 1980		
9	FW	Eric Cantona	24 May 1966		
10	FW	Christian Santos			
11	FW	Jaïrzinho Cardoso	8 February 1977		
12	FW	Noël Sciortino	25 December 1971 (aged 33)		

== Sources ==
- FIFA Squad Lists 2005
