= 1989 FIFA U-16 World Championship =

3rd FIFA U-16 World Tournament for the JVC Cup

Tournament details
- Host country: Scotland
- Dates: 10–24 June
- Teams: 16 (from 6 confederations)
- Venues: 5 (in 5 host cities)

Final positions
- Champions: Saudi Arabia (1st title)
- Runners-up: Scotland
- Third place: Portugal
- Fourth place: Bahrain

Tournament statistics
- Matches played: 32
- Goals scored: 77 (2.41 per match)
- Attendance: 256,000 (8,000 per match)
- Top scorer(s): (Bahrain) Khaled Jasem (Guinea) Fode Camara (Portugal) Gil Gomes (Portugal) Tulipa (Saudi Arabia) Khalid Al Rowaihi (3 goals each)
- Best player: (Scotland) James Will
- Fair play award: Bahrain

The 1989 FIFA U-16 World Championship, the third edition of the tournament, was held in the Scottish cities of Glasgow, Edinburgh, Motherwell, Aberdeen, and Dundee between 10 and 24 June 1989. Players born after 1 August 1972 could participate in this tournament. Saudi Arabia won the tournament and became the first Asian team to win a FIFA tournament. As of May 2026, they are the only Asian men's team to win any FIFA tournament.

== Qualified teams ==
Confederation	Qualifying tournament	Qualifier(s)
AFC (Asia)	1988 AFC U-16 Championship	Bahrain; China; Saudi Arabia
CAF (Africa)	1989 African U-16 Qualifying for World Cup	Ghana; Guinea; Nigeria
CONCACAF (Central, North America and Caribbean)	1988 CONCACAF U-16 Tournament	Canada; Cuba; United States
CONMEBOL (South America)	1988 South American U-16 Championship	Argentina; Brazil; Colombia
OFC (Oceania)	1989 OFC U-17 Championship	Australia
UEFA (Europe)	Host nation	Scotland
UEFA (Europe)	1989 UEFA European Under-16 Championship	East Germany; Portugal

== Squads ==
For full squad lists for the 1989 U-16 World Championship see 1989 FIFA U-16 World Championship squads.

== Referees ==
Asia

- (Iran) Mohammad Riyahi
- (Malaysia) Wan Rashid Jaafar
- (South Korea) Kil Ki-Chul
- (Israel) Arie Frost

Africa

- (Egypt) Mohamed Hafez
- (Tanzania) Ally Hafidhi
- (Togo) M Hounake-Kouassi

CONCACAF

- (Canada) David Brummitt
- (Guatemala) Juan Pablo Escobar
- (Antigua and Barbuda) Arlington Success

South America

- (Argentina) Ricardo Calabria
- (Brazil) Luís Félix Ferreira
- (Colombia) Armando Pérez Hoyos

Europe

- (France) Jean-Marie Lartigot
- (Denmark) Peter Mikkelsen
- (Scotland) George Smith
- (East Germany) Wieland Ziller

Oceania

- (New Zealand) Gary Fleet

== Group stage ==
=== Group A ===
Teams	GP	W	D	L	GF	GA	GD	Pts	Status
Bahrain	3	2	1	0	5	1	+4	5	Advanced to the quarter-finals
Scotland	3	1	2	0	4	1	+3	4	Advanced to the quarter-finals
Ghana	3	0	2	1	2	3	–1	2	Eliminated
Cuba	3	0	1	2	2	8	–6	1	Eliminated

10 June 1989
14:00

Scotland	0–0	Ghana
	(Report)

Hampden Park, Glasgow
Attendance: 6,500
Referee: Armando Perez Hoyos

10 June 1989
15:45

Cuba	0–3	Bahrain
	(Report)	Jasem 40' (pen.), 52' (pen.), 76' (pen.)

Hampden Park, Glasgow
Attendance: 6,500
Referee: Luis Felix Ferreira

12 June 1989
18:30

Scotland	3–0	Cuba
Lindsay 30'; McGoldrick 32', 39'	(Report)

Fir Park, Motherwell
Attendance: 9,000
Referee: Peter Mikkelsen

12 June 1989
20:15

Ghana	0–1	Bahrain
	(Report)	Ebrahim 42'

Fir Park, Motherwell
Attendance: 9,000
Referee: Wieland Ziller

14 June 1989
18:30

Scotland	1–1	Bahrain
Beattie 2'	(Report)	Abdulaziz 33'

Fir Park, Motherwell
Attendance: 13,500
Referee: Ricardo Calabria

14 June 1989
20:15

Cuba	2–2	Ghana
Zerguera 9'; Rosette 24'	(Report)	Aryee 22'; Asare 72'

Fir Park, Motherwell
Attendance: 13,500
Referee: Gary Fleet

=== Group B ===
Teams	GP	W	D	L	GF	GA	GD	Pts	Status
East Germany	3	2	0	1	7	4	+3	4	Advanced to the quarter-finals
Brazil	3	2	0	1	5	3	+2	4	Advanced to the quarter-finals
United States	3	1	1	1	5	7	–2	3	Eliminated
Australia	3	0	1	2	3	6	–3	1	Eliminated

10 June 1989
14:00

East Germany	1–0	Australia
Manke 51'	(Report)

Pittodrie Stadium, Aberdeen
Attendance: 3,300
Referee: James McCluskey

10 June 1989
15:45

United States	1–0	Brazil
Baba 37'	(Report)

Pittodrie Stadium, Aberdeen
Attendance: 3,300
Referee: Mohamed Hafez

12 June 1989
18:30

East Germany	5–2	United States
Konetzke 7', 33'; Seifert 12', 31'; Rydlewicz 45'	(Report)	Baba 36'; Wood 76'

Pittodrie Stadium, Aberdeen
Attendance: 2,300
Referee: Mohd Noor Jaafar

12 June 1989
20:15

Australia	1–3	Brazil
Corica 50'	(Report)	Carlos 11', 34'; Marcio 36'

Pittodrie Stadium, Aberdeen
Attendance: 2,300
Referee: David Brummitt

14 June 1989
18:30

East Germany	1–2	Brazil
Knuth 29'	(Report)	Márcio 4'; Fred 70'

Pittodrie Stadium, Aberdeen
Attendance: 3,500
Referee: Jean-Marie Lartigot

14 June 1989
20:15

Australia	2–2	United States
Pangallo 71'; Suzor 73'	(Report)	Wood 6'; Haskins 70'

Pittodrie Stadium, Aberdeen
Attendance: 3,500
Referee: Kil Ki-Chul

=== Group C ===
Teams	GP	W	D	L	GF	GA	GD	Pts	Status
Nigeria	3	2	1	0	7	0	+7	5	Advanced to the quarter-finals
Argentina	3	1	2	0	4	1	+3	4	Advanced to the quarter-finals
China	3	1	1	1	1	3	–2	3	Eliminated
Canada	3	0	0	3	1	9	–8	0	Eliminated

10 June 1989
14:00

Argentina	0–0	China
	(Report)

Dens Park, Dundee
Attendance: 5,000
Referee: Juan Escobar Lopez

10 June 1989
15:45

Nigeria	4–0	Canada
Keshiro 27', 75'; Oguntunase 56'; Ikpeba 78'	(Report)

Dens Park, Dundee
Attendance: 5,000
Referee: Mohammad Riyahi

12 June 1989
18:30

Argentina	0–0	Nigeria
	(Report)

Dens Park, Dundee
Attendance: 6,000
Referee: Jean-Marie Lartigot

12 June 1989
20:15

China	1–0	Canada
Gao Feng 34'	(Report)

Dens Park, Dundee
Attendance: 6,000
Referee: Dodji Hounnake-Kouassi

14 June 1989
18:30

Argentina	4–1	Canada
Paris 9'; Castro 38'; Castagno Suárez 40'; Dascanio 74'	(Report)	Medero 19' (o.g.)

Dens Park, Dundee
Attendance: 6,000
Referee: Hafidhi Ally

14 June 1989
20:15

China	0–3	Nigeria
	(Report)	Fetuga 12'; Ikpeba 22'; Umoru 39'

Dens Park, Dundee
Attendance: 6,000
Referee: Wieland Ziller

=== Group D ===
Teams	GP	W	D	L	GF	GA	GD	Pts	Status
Portugal	3	1	2	0	6	5	+1	4	Advanced to the quarter-finals
Saudi Arabia	3	1	2	0	5	4	+1	4	Advanced to the quarter-finals
Guinea	3	0	3	0	4	4	0	3	Eliminated
Colombia	3	0	1	2	3	5	–2	1	Eliminated

10 June 1989
14:00

Guinea	1–1	Colombia
Camara 2'	(Report)	Gaibao 60' (pen.)

Tynecastle Park, Edinburgh
Attendance: 2,000
Referee: David Brummitt

10 June 1989
15:45

Saudi Arabia	2–2	Portugal
Al Shamrani 60', 80'	(Report)	Figo 17' (pen.); Gil 23'

Tynecastle Park, Edinburgh
Attendance: 2,000
Referee: Ricardo Calabria

12 June 1989
18:30

Guinea	2–2	Saudi Arabia
Oularé 56'; Camara 62'	(Report)	Fofana 52' (o.g.); Al Rowaihi 71'

Tynecastle Park, Edinburgh
Attendance: 2,800
Referee: Arlington Success

12 June 1989
20:15

Colombia	2–3	Portugal
Moreno 27'; Nieto 79'	(Report)	Canate 2' (o.g.); Gil 44'; Adalberto 78'

Tynecastle Park, Edinburgh
Attendance: 2,800
Referee: Arie Frost

14 June 1989
18:30

Guinea	1–1	Portugal
Camara 24'	(Report)	Lourenço 80'

Tynecastle Park, Edinburgh
Attendance: 4,000
Referee: James McCluskey

14 June 1989
20:15

Colombia	0–1	Saudi Arabia
	(Report)	Al Rowaihi 80'

Tynecastle Park, Edinburgh
Attendance: 4,000
Referee: Mohamed Hafez

== Knockout stage ==
Quarter-finals
June 17 – Motherwell
Bahrain (pen.)	0 (4)
Brazil	0 (1)
June 17 – Dundee
Nigeria	0 (0)
Saudi Arabia (pen.)	0 (2)
June 17 – Aberdeen
East Germany	0
Scotland	1
June 17 – Edinburgh
Portugal	2
Argentina	1

Semi-finals
June 20 – Motherwell
Bahrain	0
Saudi Arabia	1
June 20 – Edinburgh
Portugal	0
Scotland	1

Final
June 24 – Glasgow
Saudi Arabia (pen.)	2 (5)
Scotland	2 (4)
Third place
June 23 – Edinburgh
Bahrain	0
Portugal	3

=== Quarter-finals ===
17 June 1989
15:00

Bahrain	0–0 (a.e.t.)	Brazil
	(Report)
Penalties
Habib (penalty scored); Hassan (penalty scored); Ali (penalty scored); Abdulaziz (penalty scored)	4–1	(penalty scored) Andrei; (penalty missed) Fred; (penalty missed) Marcio

Fir Park, Motherwell
Attendance: 9,500
Referee: Hafidhi Ally

17 June 1989
15:00

East Germany	0–1	Scotland
	(Report)	Lindsay 80'

Pittodrie Stadium, Aberdeen
Attendance: 10,200
Referee: Juan Pablo Escobar Lopez

17 June 1989
15:00

Nigeria	0–0 (a.e.t.)	Saudi Arabia
	(Report)
Penalties
	0–2

Dens Park, Dundee
Attendance: 5,500
Referee: Armando Pérez Hoyos

17 June 1989
21:00

Portugal	2–1	Argentina
Figo 23'; Tulipa 46'	(Report)	Selenzo 8'

Tynecastle Park, Edinburgh
Attendance: 5,000
Referee: Arie Frost

=== Semifinals ===
20 June 1989
19:30

Bahrain	0–1	Saudi Arabia
	(Report)	Al Rowaihi 47'

Fir Park, Motherwell
Attendance: 9,000
Referee: Wieland Ziller

20 June 1989
20:15

Portugal	0–1	Scotland
	(Report)	O'Neil 54'

Tynecastle Park, Edinburgh
Attendance: 29,000
Referee: Jean-Marie Lartigot

=== Playoff for 3rd place ===
23 June 1989
19:30

Bahrain	0–3	Portugal
	(Report)	Tulipa 24', 64'; Gil 52'

Tynecastle Park, Edinburgh
Attendance: 2,000
Referee: Hafidhi Ally

=== Final ===
24 June 1989
15:00

Saudi Arabia	2–2 (a.e.t.)	Scotland
Sulaiman 49'; Al Teriar 65'	(Report)	Downie 7'; Dickov 25'
Penalties
Al Hammali (penalty scored); Al Mousa (penalty scored); Al Shamrani (penalty missed); Al Theneyan (penalty scored); Al Teriar (penalty scored); Al Alawi (penalty scored)	5–4	(penalty missed) Dickov; (penalty scored) Bollan; (penalty scored) McLaren; (penalty scored) Bain; (penalty scored) Marshall; (penalty missed) O'Neil

Hampden Park, Glasgow
Attendance: 50,956
Referee: Juan Pablo Escobar Lopez

== Result ==
1989 FIFA U-16 World Championship winners

Saudi Arabia
First title

== Goalscorers ==
Fode Camara of Guinea won the Golden Shoe award for scoring three goals. In total, 77 goals were scored by 55 different players, with three of them credited as own goals.

3 goals

- (Bahrain) Khaled Jasem
- (Guinea) Fode Camara
- (Portugal) Gil Gomes
- (Portugal) Tulipa
- (Saudi Arabia) Khalid Al Rowaihi

2 goals

- (Brazil) Márcio
- (Brazil) Carlos
- (East Germany) Frank Seifert
- (East Germany) Toralf Konetzke
- (Nigeria) Kayode Keshiro
- (Nigeria) Victor Ikpeba
- (Portugal) Luís Figo
- (Scotland) John Lindsay
- (Scotland) Kevin McGoldrick
- (Saudi Arabia) Jabarti Al Shamrani
- (United States) Anthony Wood
- (United States) Imad Baba

1 goal

- (Argentina) Claudio Paris
- (Argentina) Diego Castagno Suárez
- (Argentina) Gabriel Dascanio
- (Argentina) Jose Castro
- (Argentina) Leonardo Selenzo
- (Australia) Anthony Pangallo
- (Australia) Jeff Suzor
- (Australia) Steve Corica
- (Bahrain) Hussain Ebrahim
- (Bahrain) Faisal Abdul aziz
- (Brazil) Marcello Melli
- (China) Gao Feng
- (Colombia) Alfredo Nieto
- (Colombia) Carlos Moreno
- (Colombia) Modesto Gaibao
- (Cuba) Bernardo Rosette
- (Cuba) Geosmany Zerguera
- (East Germany) Daniel Knuth
- (East Germany) Rene Rydlewicz
- (East Germany) Sven Manke
- (Ghana) Bernard Aryee
- (Ghana) Isaac Asare
- (Guinea) Souleymane Oularé
- (Nigeria) Babajide Oguntunase
- (Nigeria) Olusegun Fetuga
- (Nigeria) Sunny Umoru
- (Portugal) Adalberto
- (Portugal) Sérgio Lourenço
- (Saudi Arabia) Alreshoudi Sulaiman
- (Saudi Arabia) Waleed Al Terair
- (Scotland) Brian O'Neil
- (Scotland) Ian Downie
- (Scotland) James Beattie
- (Scotland) Paul Dickov
- (United States) Todd Haskins

Own goal

- (Argentina) Luis Medero (against Canada)
- (Colombia) Omar Canate (against Portugal)
- (Guinea) Mory Fofana (against Saudi Arabia)

== Final ranking ==
Rank	Team	Pld	W	D	L	GF	GA	GD	Pts
1	Saudi Arabia	6	2	4	0	8	6	+2	8
2	Scotland	6	3	3	0	8	3	+5	9
3	Portugal	6	3	2	1	11	7	+4	8
4	Bahrain	6	2	2	2	5	5	0	6
Eliminated in the quarter-finals
5	Nigeria	4	2	2	0	7	0	+7	6
6	Brazil	4	2	1	1	5	3	+2	5
7	East Germany	4	2	0	2	7	5	+2	4
8	Argentina	4	1	2	1	5	3	+2	4
Eliminated at the group stage
9	United States	3	1	1	1	5	7	–2	3
10	China	3	1	1	1	1	3	–2	3
11	Guinea	3	0	3	0	4	4	0	3
12	Ghana	3	0	2	1	2	3	–1	2
13	Colombia	3	0	1	2	3	5	–2	1
14	Australia	3	0	1	2	3	6	–3	1
15	Cuba	3	0	1	2	2	8	–6	1
16	Canada	3	0	0	3	1	9	–8	0

== Aftermath ==
After the tournament allegations were made that the Saudi Arabia players were engaged in Age fraud.
