= 1979–80 in West German football =

Football in Germany
- Season: 1979–80

Men's football
- Bundesliga: Bayern Munich
- 2. Bundesliga: Arminia Bielefeld (North); 1. FC Nürnberg (South)
- DFB-Pokal: Fortuna Düsseldorf

Women's football
- Champions: SSG Bergisch Gladbach

The 1979–80 season was the 70th season of competitive football in Germany.

== Promotion and relegation ==
=== Pre-season ===
| League | Promoted to League | Relegated from League |
|---|---|---|
| Bundesliga | Bayer 04 Leverkusen; Bayer 05 Uerdingen; 1860 Munich | Arminia Bielefeld; 1. FC Nürnberg; SV Darmstadt 98 |
| 2. Bundesliga | OSV Hannover; Rot-Weiß Oberhausen; SC Herford; OSC Bremerhaven; VfR Bürstadt; SSV Ulm 1846; ESV Ingolstadt; SV Röchling Völklingen | SC Westfalia Herne; FC St. Pauli; Wacker 04 Berlin; FC Hanau 93; FC Augsburg; KSV Baunatal; Borussia Neunkirchen |

=== Post-season ===
| League | Promoted to League | Relegated from League |
|---|---|---|
| Bundesliga | Arminia Bielefeld; 1. FC Nürnberg; Karlsruher SC | Hertha BSC; Werder Bremen; Eintracht Braunschweig |
| 2. Bundesliga | 1. FC Bocholt; VfB Oldenburg; SC Göttingen 05; SpVgg Erkenschwick; Hessen Kassel; FC Augsburg; Borussia Neunkirchen; VfB Eppingen | DSC Wanne-Eickel; OSC Bremerhaven; Arminia Hannover; Wuppertaler SV; MTV Ingolstadt; Röchling Völklingen; SV Röchling Völklingen |

== National teams ==
=== Germany national football team ===
==== Euro 1980 qualifying ====
Win Draw Loss

| Date | Venue | Location | Opponent | Score F–A | Att. | Goalscorers | | Ref. |
| Date | Venue | Location | Opponent | Score F–A | Att. | West Germany | Opponent | Ref. |
|---|---|---|---|---|---|---|---|---|
| 17 October 1979 | Müngersdorfer Stadion | Cologne, West Germany | Wales | 5–1 | 61,000 | Fischer 23', 38'; Kaltz 32'; Rummenigge 41'; Förster 83' | Curtis 85' | |
| 22 December 1979 | Parkstadion | Gelsenkirchen, West Germany | Turkey | 2–0 | 70,000 | Fischer 15'; Zimmermann 89' | — | |
| 27 February 1980 | Weserstadion | Bremen, West Germany | Malta | 8–0 | 33,278 | Allofs 14', 56'; Bonhof 19' (pen.); Fischer 40', 90'; Holland 61' (o.g.); Kelsch 70'; Rummenigge 74' | — | |

==== Euro 1980 ====
Win Draw Loss

| Round | Date | Venue | Location | Opponent | Score F–A | Att. | Goalscorers | | Ref. |
| Round | Date | Venue | Location | Opponent | Score F–A | Att. | West Germany | Opponent | Ref. |
|---|---|---|---|---|---|---|---|---|---|
| Group A | 11 June 1980 | Stadio Olimpico | Rome, Italy | Czechoslovakia | 1–0 | 10,500 | Rummenigge 55' | — | |
| Group A | 14 June 1980 | Stadio San Paolo | Naples, Italy | Netherlands | 3–2 | 29,889 | Allofs 20', 60', 66' | Rep 80' (pen.); W. van de Kerkhof 86' | |
| Group A | 17 June 1980 | Stadio Comunale | Turin, Italy | Greece | 0–0 | 13,901 | — | — | |
| Final | 22 June 1980 | Stadio Olimpico | Rome, Italy | Belgium | 2–1 | 47,860 | Hrubesch 10', 89' | Vandereycken 72' (pen.) | |

==== Friendly matches ====
Win Draw Loss

| Date | Venue | Location | Opponent | Score F–A | Att. | Goalscorers | | Ref. |
| Date | Venue | Location | Opponent | Score F–A | Att. | West Germany | Opponent | Ref. |
|---|---|---|---|---|---|---|---|---|
| 12 September 1979 | Olympiastadion | West Berlin | Argentina | 2–1 | 45,000 | Allofs 47'; Rummenigge 58' | Castro 84' | |
| 21 November 1979 | Boris Paichadze National Stadium | Tbilisi, Georgian SSR | Soviet Union | 3–1 | 40,000 | Rummenigge 35', 62'; Fischer 66' | Makhovikov 83' | |
| 2 April 1980 | Olympiastadion | Munich, West Germany | Austria | 1–0 | 78,000 | Müller 34' | — | |
| 13 May 1980 | Waldstadion | Frankfurt, West Germany | Poland | 3–1 | 45,000 | Rummenigge 6'; Allofs 38'; Schuster 57' | Boniek 35' | |

== League season ==
=== Bundesliga ===
| Pos | Team | Pld | W | D | L | GF | GA | GD | Pts | Qualification or relegation |
|---|---|---|---|---|---|---|---|---|---|---|
| 1 | Bayern Munich (C) | 34 | 22 | 6 | 6 | 84 | 33 | +51 | 50 | Qualification to European Cup first round |
| 2 | Hamburger SV | 34 | 20 | 8 | 6 | 86 | 35 | +51 | 48 | Qualification to UEFA Cup first round (Note: Eintracht Frankfurt won the 1979–80 UEFA Cup and thereby automatically qualified as defending champions.) |
| 3 | VfB Stuttgart | 34 | 18 | 5 | 11 | 75 | 53 | +22 | 41 | Qualification to UEFA Cup first round |
| 4 | 1. FC Kaiserslautern | 34 | 17 | 7 | 10 | 75 | 53 | +22 | 41 | Qualification to UEFA Cup first round |
| 5 | 1. FC Köln | 34 | 14 | 9 | 11 | 72 | 55 | +17 | 37 | Qualification to UEFA Cup first round |
| 6 | Borussia Dortmund | 34 | 14 | 8 | 12 | 64 | 56 | +8 | 36 | |
| 7 | Borussia Mönchengladbach | 34 | 12 | 12 | 10 | 61 | 60 | +1 | 36 | |
| 8 | Schalke 04 | 34 | 12 | 9 | 13 | 40 | 51 | −11 | 33 | |
| 9 | Eintracht Frankfurt | 34 | 15 | 2 | 17 | 65 | 61 | +4 | 32 | Qualification to UEFA Cup first round |
| 10 | VfL Bochum | 34 | 13 | 6 | 15 | 41 | 44 | −3 | 32 | |
| 11 | Fortuna Düsseldorf | 34 | 13 | 6 | 15 | 62 | 72 | −10 | 32 | Qualification to Cup Winners' Cup first round |
| 12 | Bayer Leverkusen | 34 | 12 | 8 | 14 | 45 | 61 | −16 | 32 | |
| 13 | 1860 Munich | 34 | 10 | 10 | 14 | 42 | 53 | −11 | 30 | |
| 14 | MSV Duisburg | 34 | 11 | 7 | 16 | 43 | 57 | −14 | 29 | |
| 15 | Bayer 05 Uerdingen | 34 | 12 | 5 | 17 | 43 | 61 | −18 | 29 | |
| 16 | Hertha BSC (R) | 34 | 11 | 7 | 16 | 41 | 61 | −20 | 29 | Relegation to 2. Bundesliga |
| 17 | Werder Bremen (R) | 34 | 11 | 3 | 20 | 52 | 93 | −41 | 25 | Relegation to 2. Bundesliga |
| 18 | Eintracht Braunschweig (R) | 34 | 6 | 8 | 20 | 32 | 64 | −32 | 20 | Relegation to 2. Bundesliga |

Source: www.dfb.de
Rules for classification: 1) points; 2) goal difference; 3) number of goals scored.
(C) Champions; (R) Relegated

=== 2. Bundesliga ===
==== North ====
| Pos | Team | Pld | W | D | L | GF | GA | GD | Pts | Promotion, qualification or relegation |
|---|---|---|---|---|---|---|---|---|---|---|
| 1 | Arminia Bielefeld (C, P) | 38 | 30 | 6 | 2 | 120 | 31 | +89 | 66 | Promotion to Bundesliga |
| 2 | Rot-Weiss Essen | 38 | 24 | 6 | 8 | 97 | 54 | +43 | 54 | Qualification to promotion play-offs |
| 3 | Hannover 96 | 38 | 23 | 6 | 9 | 70 | 38 | +32 | 52 | |
| 4 | Viktoria Köln | 38 | 16 | 14 | 8 | 77 | 52 | +25 | 46 | |
| 5 | SG Wattenscheid 09 | 38 | 17 | 12 | 9 | 72 | 57 | +15 | 46 | |
| 6 | Fortuna Köln | 38 | 17 | 11 | 10 | 79 | 54 | +25 | 45 | |
| 7 | Alemannia Aachen | 38 | 17 | 7 | 14 | 59 | 56 | +3 | 41 | |
| 8 | VfL Osnabrück | 38 | 16 | 8 | 14 | 64 | 68 | −4 | 40 | |
| 9 | SG Union Solingen | 38 | 13 | 12 | 13 | 66 | 55 | +11 | 38 | |
| 10 | Preußen Münster | 38 | 13 | 10 | 15 | 53 | 59 | −6 | 36 | |
| 11 | DSC Wanne-Eickel (Note: DSC Wanne-Eickel voluntarily returned their license for the following season to the DFB and were therefore relegated.) (R) | 38 | 15 | 6 | 17 | 63 | 71 | −8 | 36 | Relegation to Oberliga |
| 12 | OSV Hannover | 38 | 13 | 10 | 15 | 55 | 79 | −24 | 36 | |
| 13 | Tennis Borussia Berlin | 38 | 13 | 9 | 16 | 57 | 65 | −8 | 35 | |
| 14 | Holstein Kiel | 38 | 13 | 7 | 18 | 61 | 67 | −6 | 33 | |
| 15 | Rot-Weiß Oberhausen | 38 | 13 | 7 | 18 | 46 | 67 | −21 | 33 | |
| 16 | Rot-Weiß Lüdenscheid | 38 | 11 | 10 | 17 | 56 | 73 | −17 | 32 | |
| 17 | SC Herford | 38 | 11 | 9 | 18 | 48 | 69 | −21 | 31 | |
| 18 | OSC Bremerhaven (R) | 38 | 10 | 7 | 21 | 52 | 79 | −27 | 27 | Relegation to Oberliga |
| 19 | Arminia Hannover (R) | 38 | 8 | 1 | 29 | 40 | 92 | −52 | 17 | Relegation to Oberliga |
| 20 | Wuppertaler SV (R) | 38 | 5 | 6 | 27 | 35 | 84 | −49 | 16 | Relegation to Oberliga |

Source: Bundesliga.de
Rules for classification: 1) points; 2) goal difference; 3) number of goals scored.
(C) Champions; (P) Promoted; (R) Relegated

==== South ====
| Pos | Team | Pld | W | D | L | GF | GA | GD | Pts | Promotion, qualification or relegation |
|---|---|---|---|---|---|---|---|---|---|---|
| 1 | 1. FC Nürnberg (C, P) | 40 | 26 | 9 | 5 | 88 | 38 | +50 | 61 | Promotion to Bundesliga |
| 2 | Karlsruher SC (P) | 40 | 27 | 5 | 8 | 104 | 52 | +52 | 59 | Qualification to promotion play-offs |
| 3 | Stuttgarter Kickers | 40 | 22 | 8 | 10 | 94 | 54 | +40 | 52 | |
| 4 | Darmstadt 98 | 40 | 21 | 6 | 13 | 81 | 42 | +39 | 48 | |
| 5 | 1. FC Saarbrücken | 40 | 21 | 5 | 14 | 69 | 56 | +13 | 47 | |
| 6 | SC Freiburg | 40 | 18 | 10 | 12 | 68 | 54 | +14 | 46 | |
| 7 | SpVgg Fürth | 40 | 17 | 10 | 13 | 56 | 51 | +5 | 44 | |
| 8 | Kickers Offenbach | 40 | 17 | 9 | 14 | 78 | 64 | +14 | 43 | |
| 9 | Freiburger FC | 40 | 15 | 13 | 12 | 78 | 64 | +14 | 43 | |
| 10 | Wormatia Worms | 40 | 15 | 8 | 17 | 67 | 73 | −6 | 38 | |
| 11 | Waldhof Mannheim | 40 | 16 | 6 | 18 | 57 | 69 | −12 | 38 | |
| 12 | FC Homburg | 40 | 13 | 11 | 16 | 58 | 62 | −4 | 37 | |
| 13 | SpVgg Bayreuth | 40 | 16 | 5 | 19 | 77 | 82 | −5 | 37 | |
| 14 | VfR Bürstadt | 40 | 13 | 11 | 16 | 57 | 68 | −11 | 37 | |
| 15 | Eintracht Trier | 40 | 14 | 8 | 18 | 60 | 57 | +3 | 36 | |
| 16 | SSV Ulm 1846 | 40 | 14 | 8 | 18 | 51 | 57 | −6 | 36 | |
| 17 | ESV Ingolstadt | 40 | 13 | 8 | 19 | 57 | 89 | −32 | 34 | |
| 18 | FSV Frankfurt | 40 | 13 | 6 | 21 | 63 | 97 | −34 | 32 | |
| 19 | MTV Ingolstadt (R) | 40 | 11 | 7 | 22 | 58 | 81 | −23 | 29 | Relegation to Oberliga |
| 20 | Röchling Völklingen (R) | 40 | 10 | 2 | 28 | 49 | 101 | −52 | 22 | Relegation to Oberliga |
| 21 | FV Würzburg (R) | 40 | 6 | 9 | 25 | 42 | 82 | −40 | 21 | Relegation to Oberliga |

Source: Bundesliga.de
Rules for classification: 1) points; 2) goal difference; 3) number of goals scored.
(C) Champions; (P) Promoted; (R) Relegated

== DFB–Pokal ==
Fortuna Düsseldorf won the 1979–80 DFB-Pokal final by defeating 1. FC Köln 2–1 on 4 June 1980.

== German clubs in Europe ==
=== European Cup ===
==== Hamburger SV ====
Hamburger SV finished the 1979–80 European Cup as runners-up losing to Nottingham Forest 0–1 in the 1980 European Cup Final.

=== European Cup Winners' Cup ===
==== Fortuna Düsseldorf ====
Fortuna Düsseldorf were eliminated in the first round of the European Cup Winners' Cup by Rangers.

=== UEFA Cup ===
Five teams from West Germany competed in the UEFA Cup this season. 1. FC Kaiserslautern were eliminated in the quarter-finals. Bayern Munich, Borussia Mönchengladbach, Eintracht Frankfurt, and VfB Stuttgart made up a semi-finals consisting of only teams from West Germany. Frankfurt would go on to win the competition with Gladbach finishing as runners-up.

==== Borussia Mönchengladbach ====
Borussia Mönchengladbach were runners-up in the UEFA Cup after losing to Eintracht Frankfurt due to the away goals rule.

==== Eintracht Frankfurt ====
Eintracht Frankfurt won the UEFA Cup by defeating Borussia Mönchengladbach in the 1980 UEFA Cup Final due to the away goals rule.

==== VfB Stuttgart ====
VfB Stuttgart were eliminated in the semi-finals of the UEFA Cup by Borussia Mönchengladbach.

==== Bayern Munich ====
Bayern Munich were eliminated in the semi-finals of the UEFA Cup by eventual champions Eintracht Frankfurt.

==== 1. FC Kaiserlsautern ====
1. FC Kaiserslautern were eliminated in the quarter-finals of the UEFA Cup by Bayern Munich.
