= Manuel Rodríguez =

Manuel Rodríguez may refer to:

== Arts ==
- Manuel Rodríguez López (1934–1990), Spanish poet and writer
- Manuel Rodríguez Lozano (1896–1971), Mexican painter
- Manuel Rodríguez Objío (1838–1871), Dominican poet and activist
- Manuel Rodriguez Sr. (1912–2017), aka "Mang Maning", Filipino printmaker

== Politics ==
- Manuel Rodríguez Cuadros (born 1949), Peruvian politician and diplomat
- Manuel Rodríguez Erdoíza (1785–1818), Chilean lawyer and guerrilla leader
- Manuel Rodríguez González (born 1966), Mexican politician, elected for the 4th federal electoral district of Tabasco
- Manuel Rodríguez Orellana (born 1948), Puerto Rican legal scholar and political leader
- Manuel Rodríguez Ramos (1908–????), Puerto Rican writer, professor and politician
- Manuel Rodríguez Torices (1788–1816), Neogranadine lawyer, journalist, and pro-independence statesman
- Manuel Rodríguez Valenzuela (1900–1956), Chilean teacher and politician

== Science ==
- Manuel Rodríguez Gómez (1928–2006), American neurologist

== Sports ==
- Manuel Rodríguez Arzuaga (1876–1952), Spanish athlete
- Manolete (Manuel Rodríguez Sánchez, 1917–1947), Spanish bullfighter
- Manuel Rodríguez (cyclist) (1926–1997), Spanish cyclist
- Manuel Rodríguez (footballer) (1938–2018), Chilean footballer
- Manuel Rodríguez Navarro (born 1969), Spanish wheelchair basketball player
- Manuel Cristian Rodríguez (boxer) (born 1973), Argentine boxer
- Manuel Rodríguez (first baseman) (born 1985), Panamanian baseball player
- Manu Rodríguez (basketball) (born 1991), Spanish basketball player
- Manu Rodríguez (footballer) (born 2005), Spanish footballer
- Manuel Rodríguez (pitcher) (born 1996), Mexican baseball player
- Manuel Rodríguez (tennis), Chilean tennis player

== Other uses ==
- Manuel Rodríguez Patriotic Front, left-wing guerrilla movement in Chile
- Manuel Rodriguez Island, an island in the Patagonian Archipelago in Magallanes y la Antártica Chilena Region, Chile
- Manuel Rodríguez (TV series), a 2010 Chilean telenovela based on the life of Manuel Rodríguez Erdoiza
