= Asere =

Asere may refer to:

== Places ==
- Asere, a quarter in Accra, Ghana
- Asere, a village in Ogun State, Nigeria
- Asere, a village in Ondo State, Nigeria

== Other uses ==
- Asere, 1995 album by Willy Chirino
- Asere, a music group which collaborated with Billy Cobham
- Emmanuel Asere (b. 1973), Ghanaian footballer at the 1989 FIFA U-16 World Championship
