= Shaker Al-Shujaa =

Saudi Arabian footballer

Personal information
- Full name: Shaker Al-Shujaa Al-Alyan
- Date of birth: 2 August 1972
- Place of birth: Saudi Arabia
- Date of death: 5 March 2018 (aged 45)
- Height: 1.70 m (5 ft 7 in)
- Position: Goalkeeper

Senior career*
| Years | Team | Apps | (Gls) |
- Al-Nassr

International career
| 1992 | Saudi Arabia | 8 | (0) |
Medal record
Representing Saudi Arabia
AFC Asian Cup
| Runner-up | 1992 AFC Asian Cup |
FIFA U-17 World Cup
| Winner | 1989 FIFA U-16 World Championship |
- * Club domestic league appearances and goals

Shaker Al-Shujaa Al-Alyan was a Saudi football goalkeeper who played for Al-Nassr and the Saudi Arabia national team. He was also part of the U-16 Saudi squad that won the 1989 FIFA U-16 World Championship.
