= Rivers Guthrie =

American soccer player

Personal information
- Date of birth: September 25, 1972 (age 54)
- Place of birth: Charlotte, North Carolina, U.S.
- Height: 6 ft 0 in (1.83 m)
- Position: Midfielder

Youth career
- 1991–1994: Clemson Tigers

Senior career*
Years	Team	Apps	(Gls)
1995	Colorado Foxes	20	(3)
1995–1996	Tampa Bay Terror (indoor)	1	(0)
1996	Tampa Bay Mutiny	0	(0)
1996	New Orleans Riverboat Gamblers	16	(3)
1997	Colorado Foxes	25	(5)
1998	Charleston Battery	11	(0)
1999–2000	Orange County Zodiac	23	(2)
2001	Atlanta Silverbacks	4	(0)
2001	→ Colorado Rapids (loan)	1	(0)

International career
1988–1989	U.S. U-16		
- * Club domestic league appearances and goals

Rivers Guthrie is an American retired soccer midfielder who played professionally in the USL A-League and Major League Soccer. He played the United States U-16 men's national soccer team at the 1989 FIFA U-16 World Championship.

In 1989, Guthrie played two games for the United States U-16 men's national soccer team at the 1989 FIFA U-16 World Championship. Guthrie attended Clemson University, playing on the men's soccer team from 1991 to 1994. In 1995, he turned professional with the Colorado Rapids of the A-League. That season, the Foxes went to the championship where they fell to the Montreal Impact. Guthrie played one game with the Tampa Bay Terror during the 1995-1996 National Professional Soccer League season. In 1996, Guthrie signed with the Tampa Bay Mutiny of Major League Soccer. He never played for the Mutiny, but spent most of the season with the New Orleans Riverboat Gamblers of USISL. In 1997, he returned to the Foxes but the team folded at the end of the season. In February 1998, Guthrie signed with the Charleston Battery. He moved to the Orange County Zodiac in 1999 and played for the team through 2000, but only played three games for them that season. In 2001, he signed with the Atlanta Silverbacks. In May, the Colorado Rapids called up Guthrie for one game. The Silverbacks released him in July.
