= Khalid Al Rowaihi =

Saudi Arabian footballer (1972–1993)

Khalid Al-Rowaihi
Personal information
- Date of birth: 15 December 1972
- Place of birth: Tabuk, Saudi Arabia
- Date of death: 14 March 1993 (aged 20)
- Place of death: Amman, Jordan
- Position: Forward

Youth career
- 1985–1987: Al-Watani

Senior career*
Years	Team	Apps	(Gls)
1987–1989	Al-Watani	21	(7)
1989–1993	Al-Ahli	35	(19)

International career
1988–1989	Saudi Arabia U17	18	(14)
Medal record
Representing Saudi Arabia
Men's football
FIFA U-17 World Cup
Winner	1989 Scotland
- * Club domestic league appearances and goals

Khalid Al-Rowaihi (Arabic: خالد الرويحي; 15 December 1972 – 14 March 1993) was a Saudi Arabian professional footballer who played as a forward for Al-Watani club and Al-Ahli club.

== Early life ==
Al-Rowaihi was born in Tabuk on 15 December 1972. His father was from Saudi Arabia and his mother from Egypt.

== Career ==
Al-Rowaihi played in the 1989 FIFA World Youth Championship with the Saudi national under-16 team and got on the top goalscorers list in the World cup, in the Asian under-15 cup and in Thailand in 1988.

He scored with the Saudi team 14 goals, and with Al-Ahli club 19 goals.

== Death ==
Al-Rowaihi died in a road accident in Jordan on 14 March 1993, aged 20 years.

== Honors ==
Saudi Arabia U17

- FIFA U-17 World Cup: 1989
- AFC U-17 Championship: 1988
