= Francisco Petrasso =

Argentine footballer

Personal information
- Full name: Francisco Petrasso
- Date of birth: 28 January 2002 (age 24)
- Place of birth: Béccar, Argentina
- Height: 1.91 m (6 ft 3 in)
- Position: Centre-back

Team information
- Current team: Rio Ave
- Number: 23

Youth career
- River Plate

Senior career*
Years	Team	Apps	(Gls)
2023–2024	Independiente Rivadavia	43	(1)
2024–	Rio Ave	32	(1)
- * Club domestic league appearances and goals as of 17:39, 20 August 2026 (UTC)

Francisco Petrasso (born 28 January 2002) is an Argentine professional footballer who plays as a centre-back for Primeira Liga club Rio Ave.

== Club career ==
=== Independiente Rivadavia ===
Petrasso came through the River Plate academy and left to join Primera Nacional club Independiente Rivadavia after his contract expired on 30 November 2022. He made his debut on 10 February 2023, coming on as a substitute in second half added time for Luciano Abecasis in a 2–1 win against Aldosivi. Over the course of the season he established himself in the team and helped them to promotion.

He started Independiente Rivadavia's first game back in the Liga Profesional, a 1–0 defeat to Independiente in the Copa de la Liga Profesional. He scored his first goal for the club in a 1–0 win against Argentino de Quilmes on 27 March 2024.

=== Rio Ave ===
On 26 August 2024, he moved abroad to Primeira Liga club Rio Ave. He made his debut on 19 October in a Taça de Portugal game against Atlético CP, where he was injured but his side won 3–1. Throughout his first season with the club, he struggled with injuries and thus received limited game time. He scored his first goal for the club in the final game of the season, a 1–1 draw with Gil Vicente on 16 May 2025.

He became more established in the 2025–26 season, occasionally captaining the side.

== Career statistics ==
As of 20 August 2026

Appearances and goals by club, season and competition
Club	Season	League			Cup (Note: Includes Copa Argentina and Taça de Portugal)		Continental		Other		Total	
Club	Season	Division	Goals	Apps	Apps	Goals	Apps	Goals	Apps	Goals	Apps	Goals
Independiente Rivadavia	2023	Primera Nacional	25	0	—		—		—		25	0
Independiente Rivadavia	2024	Liga Profesional	18	1	2	1	—		—		20	1
Independiente Rivadavia	Total		43	1	2	1	0	0	0	0	45	2
Rio Ave	2024–25	Primeira Liga	7	1	2	0	—		—		9	1
Rio Ave	2025–26	Primeira Liga	23	0	1	0	—		—		24	0
Rio Ave	2026–27	Primeira Liga	2	0	0	0	—		—		2	0
Rio Ave	Total		32	1	3	0	0	0	0	0	35	1
Career total			75	2	5	0	0	0	0	0	80	2

== Honours ==
Independiente Rivadavia

- Primera Nacional: 2023
