= Tayfun Devrimol =

Turkish-born Australian soccer player

Personal information
- Date of birth: 22 April 1980 (age 46)
- Place of birth: Australia
- Positions: Defender; forward

Youth career
- UTS Olympic

Senior career*
Years	Team	Apps	(Gls)
2000–2001	Bonnyrigg White Eagles FC		
2001	AC United		
2002–2003	Bonnyrigg White Eagles FC		
2003	Sydney Crescent Star		
2004	Johor FA		(0)
2004–2005	Bonnyrigg White Eagles FC		
2006	Preston Lions FC		
2007–2008	Blacktown City FC		
2008	Bankstown City FC	15	(2)
2008	Nadroga F.C.		
2008–2010	Bonnyrigg White Eagles FC		
2010	Sydney Olympic FC		
2015	Port Saints FC		
2016	Mounties Wanderers FC	14	(0)

International career
	Australia (beach soccer)	2+	
- * Club domestic league appearances and goals

Tayfun Devrimol (born 22 April 1980 in Turkey) is a Turkish-born Australian former footballer who last played for Mounties Wanderers in his home country.

== Malaysia ==
Devrimol was suspended for his team's first round of the 2004 Malaysia Cup and was dropped after spitting at coach Raul Carrizo following a 3–2 victory over Perlis FA, getting fined 3000 Australian dollars for his repugnant behavior.

== Fiji ==
Was one of three Australians in Nadroga for the 2008 Fiji Inter-District Championship.

== Futsal ==
The Australian represented the Australia national futsal team at the 2002 FIFA Beach Soccer World Cup, making two appearances and scoring zero goals.
