= Eduardo Testa =

Brazil-born soccer player

Eduardo Testa is a Brazil-born soccer player who represented the US in the first ever FIFA Beach Soccer World Cup in Rio de Janeiro 2005. Testa played both group matches against Japan and Portugal and scored one goal in the competition.
