= Viktor Moroz =

Ukrainian footballer and coach

Viktor Moroz Віктор Мороз
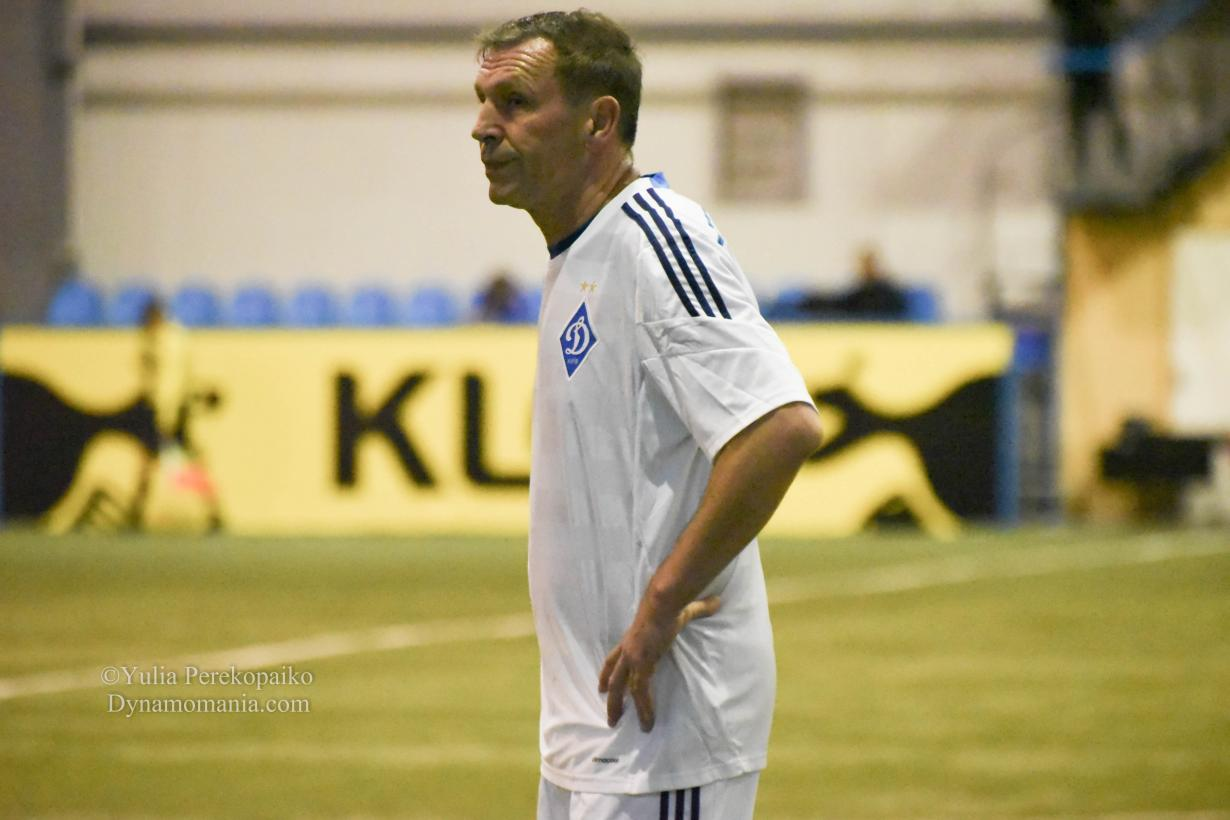

Personal information
- Full name: Viktor Vasylyovych Moroz
- Date of birth: 18 January 1968 (age 58)
- Place of birth: Kyiv, Soviet Union
- Height: 1.82 m (6 ft 0 in)
- Position: Defender

Senior career*
Years	Team	Apps	(Gls)
1986–1993	Dynamo Kyiv	22	(0)
1992–1993	→ Dynamo-2 Kyiv	27	(1)
1993–1995	Hapoel Be'er Sheva	63	(20)
1995–1996	Maccabi Tel Aviv	25	(2)
1996–1997	Hapoel Tzafririm Holon	17	(1)
1999	CSKA Kyiv	13	(0)
1999	→ CSKA-2 Kyiv	6	(1)
2000	Liaoning Whowin	15	(0)

Managerial career
- 2005: Ukraine national beach soccer team
- 2007–2009: Dynamo Kyiv (scout)
- 2012–2013: Volyn Lutsk
- * Club domestic league appearances and goals

Viktor Vasylyovych Moroz (Ukrainian: Віктор Васильович Мороз; born 18 January 1968) is a Ukrainian professional football coach and a former player. In 2005, he manages the Ukraine national beach soccer team. He made his professional debut in the Soviet Second League in 1986 for FC Dynamo Kyiv.

== Honours ==
- Soviet Top League champion: 1990.
