= 1989 UEFA European Under-16 Championship =

1989 U16-EM i fodbold for mænd

Tournament details
- Host country: Denmark
- Dates: 4–14 May
- Teams: 16 (from 1 confederation)

Final positions
- Champions: Portugal (1st title)
- Runners-up: East Germany
- Third place: France
- Fourth place: Spain

Tournament statistics
- Matches played: 28
- Goals scored: 87 (3.11 per match)
- Attendance: 13,720 (490 per match)

The 1989 UEFA European Under-16 Championship was the 7th edition of the UEFA's European Under-16 Football Championship. Denmark hosted the 16 teams that contested 4–14 May 1989.

Spain unsuccessfully defended its first title.

Portugal won their first title.

== Participants ==
- Austria
- Bulgaria
- Denmark
- East Germany
- France
- Greece
- Italy
- Netherlands
- Norway
- Portugal
- Romania
- Scotland
- Soviet Union
- Spain
- Switzerland
- Yugoslavia

== Results ==
=== First stage ===
==== Group A ====
Team	Pld	W	D	L	GF	GA	GD	Pts
Portugal	3	3	0	0	9	0	+9	6
Switzerland	3	1	1	1	4	3	+1	3
Romania	3	1	1	1	1	4	−3	3
Norway	3	0	0	3	1	8	−7	0

4 May 1989

Portugal	2–0	Switzerland
Gil 16', 45'

Silkeborg
Attendance: 250

4 May 1989

Norway	0–1	Romania

Aarhus
Attendance: 250

6 May 1989

Portugal	3–0	Norway
Figo 20'; Gil 55'; Bino 62'

Spjald
Attendance: 300

6 May 1989

Switzerland	0–0	Romania

Rødding
Attendance: 500

8 May 1989

Portugal	4–0	Romania
Gil 13', 17', 42', 72'

Vejen
Attendance: 300

8 May 1989

Switzerland	4–1	Norway

Fredericia
Attendance: 120

==== Group B ====
Team	Pld	W	D	L	GF	GA	GD	Pts
France	3	2	1	0	7	3	+4	5
Yugoslavia	3	2	1	0	4	0	+4	5
Denmark	3	1	0	2	10	9	+1	2
Austria	3	0	0	3	5	14	−9	0

4 May 1989

France	0–0	Yugoslavia

Hedensted
Attendance: 750

4 May 1989

Austria	3–9	Denmark
		x6 Brian Skaarup

Vejle
Attendance: 1,500

6 May 1989

France	3–2	Austria

Aarhus
Attendance: 200

6 May 1989

Yugoslavia	2–0	Denmark

Horsens
Attendance: 1,200

8 May 1989

France	4–1	Denmark

Vejle

8 May 1989

Yugoslavia	2–0	Austria

Odder
Attendance: 350

==== Group C ====
Team	Pld	W	D	L	GF	GA	GD	Pts
Spain	3	2	1	0	5	2	+3	5
Netherlands	3	1	1	1	4	5	−1	3
Bulgaria	3	0	2	1	3	4	−1	2
Greece	3	0	2	1	4	5	−1	2

4 May 1989

Bulgaria	1–1	Greece

Langeskov
Attendance: 50

4 May 1989

Spain	2–0	Netherlands

Nyborg
Attendance: 250

6 May 1989

Bulgaria	2–2	Spain

Thurø
Attendance: 700

6 May 1989

Greece	3–3	Netherlands

Odense
Attendance: 100

8 May 1989

Bulgaria	0–1	Netherlands

Odense
Attendance: 100

8 May 1989

Greece	0–1	Spain

Svendborg
Attendance: 350

==== Group D ====
Team	Pld	W	D	L	GF	GA	GD	Pts
East Germany	3	1	2	0	4	3	+1	4
Soviet Union	3	1	2	0	4	3	+1	4
Scotland	3	0	2	1	4	5	−1	2
Italy	3	0	2	1	2	3	−1	2

4 May 1989

Scotland	1–2	Soviet Union

Kolding
Attendance: 150

4 May 1989

East Germany	1–0	Italy

Sønder Omme
Attendance: 400

6 May 1989

Scotland	2–2	East Germany

Vadre
Attendance: 400

6 May 1989

Soviet Union	1–1	Italy

Holstebro
Attendance: 900

8 May 1989

Scotland	1–1	Italy

Vildbjerg
Attendance: 900

8 May 1989

Soviet Union	1–1	East Germany
Penalties
	5–6

Aabenraa
Attendance: 450

=== Semi-finals ===
11 May 1989

Portugal	2–1	Spain
Gil 40', 45'		Angel Manuel Cuellar 60'

Kolding
Attendance: 300

11 May 1989

France	0–3	East Germany

Silkeborg
Attendance: 200

=== Third place match ===
14 May 1989

France	3–2	Spain

Brande
Attendance: 300

=== Final ===
14 May 1989

Portugal	4–1	East Germany
Canana 15'; Figo 58'; Simão 63'; Gil 79'		46' Kampf

Vejle
Attendance: 950
Referee: (Netherlands) Jaap Uilenberg
