= Gil Gomes =

Portuguese footballer

Personal information
- Full name: Nélson Gil de Almeida Gomes
- Date of birth: 2 December 1972 (age 53)
- Place of birth: Luanda, Portuguese Angola
- Height: 1.75 m (5 ft 9 in)
- Position: Forward

Youth career
- 1987–1991: Benfica

Senior career*
Years	Team	Apps	(Gls)
1991–1992	Ovarense	22	(2)
1992–1993	Tours	12	(1)
1993–1994	Braga	24	(0)
1994–1995	Estrela Amadora	6	(0)
1995–1996	Yverdon	13	(7)
1996–1997	Wil		
1997	Philadelphia KiXX		
1997–1998	Jacksonville Cyclones	8	(1)
1998–1999	Avellino	3	(0)
1999–2000	Welwitchia		
2000–2001	Hendon	0	(0)
2001–2002	Middlewich Town		
2002–2003	Salford City		
2003–2004	Hyde United		
2004–2005	New East Manchester		

International career
1989	Portugal U16	8	(12)
1989	Portugal U17	6	(3)
1988–1990	Portugal U18	15	(7)
1990–1991	Portugal U20	11	(3)
1991–1994	Portugal U21	19	(4)
Medal record
Men's football
Representing Portugal
FIFA U-20 World Cup
Winner	1991 Portugal
UEFA European Under-21 Championship
Runner-up	1994 France
FIFA U-17 World Cup
Third place	1989 Scotland
UEFA European Under-17 Championship
Winner	1989 Denmark
- * Club domestic league appearances and goals

Nélson Gil de Almeida Gomes (born 2 December 1972) is a Portuguese former professional footballer who played as a forward.

== Career ==
Born in Luanda, Portuguese Angola, Gomes moved to Portugal at a young age, joining S.L. Benfica's youth system at the age of 14. He excelled at the 1991 FIFA World Youth Championship with the Portugal under-20 team, scoring one goal in five matches as the tournament ended in victory. At senior level, however, his Primeira Liga input consisted of 30 games over two seasons, not being able to find the net with S.C. Braga and C.F. Estrela da Amadora.

After leaving his adopted nation in 1995 and until his retirement ten years later – he had already had a spell abroad with French club Tours FC – Gomes played all but exclusively in lower league and amateur football. In his last six seasons he competed in England, representing Welwitchia, Hendon, Middlewich Town, Salford City, Hyde United and New East Manchester.

== Personal life ==
Gomes' son, Angel, was born in England while his father was playing there, and represented both Manchester United and England.

== Honours ==
Portugal

- UEFA European Under-16 Championship: 1989
- FIFA World Youth Championship: 1991
