= Kevin McGoldrick =

Scottish footballer and manager

Personal information
- Full name: Kevin McGoldrick
- Date of birth: 12 May 1972 (age 54)
- Place of birth: Glasgow, Scotland
- Height: 1.78 m (5 ft 10 in)
- Position: Left winger

Team information
- Current team: Kirkintilloch Rob Roy (Head of Football Operations)

Youth career
- Gleniffer Thistle

Senior career*
Years	Team	Apps	(Gls)
1990	Morton	2	(0)
1990	Ferguslie United		
1990	Morton	13	(0)
- Campsie Black Watch
1994–1998	Queen's Park	96	(14)
1998–1999	East Stirlingshire	20	(2)
1999–2000	Queen's Park	20	(3)
- Harestanes

International career
- Scotland U16

Managerial career
- 2010: Stenhousemuir (joint-caretaker)
- 2018–2019: Kilsyth Rangers
- 2022–2023: Kirkintilloch Rob Roy
Medal record
Men's football
Representing Scotland
FIFA U-16 World Championship
Runner-up	1989 Scotland
- * Club domestic league appearances and goals

Kevin McGoldrick (born 12 May 1972) is a Scottish football coach and former player who is Head of Football Operations at Kirkintilloch Rob Roy. As a player, he played as a left winger in the Scottish League for Queen's Park, East Stirlingshire and Morton.

== Playing career ==
As a player, he made over 110 appearances as a left winger in the Scottish League for Queen's Park and also played for East Stirlingshire and Morton. He was capped by Scotland at U16 level and was a part of the squad which reached the final of the 1989 U16 World Championship.

== Coaching career ==
After his retirement as a player, McGoldrick entered coaching and held youth roles with Queen's Park, Stenhousemuir, the Scottish Football Association and in China on behalf of Manchester City. He was assistant manager at Stenhousemuir in two spells and took joint-caretaker charge of the team in 2010. He also served East Fife as assistant manager. McGoldrick later managed Kilsyth Rangers and Kirkintilloch Rob Roy. He moved into the role of Head of Football Operations at the latter club in October 2023.

== Personal life ==
McGoldrick is the uncle of footballer Salim Kouider-Aïssa. He has worked as a taxi driver and in a tannery.

== Honours ==
Queen's Park

- Scottish League Third Division: 1999–00

Harestanes

- Scottish Amateur Cup: 2001–02, 2002–03
