= Robertinho (beach soccer) =

Brazilian beach soccer player (born 1969)

Personal information
- Full name: Roberto Vilela
- Date of birth: 21 August 1969 (age 57)
- Place of birth: Brazil
- Position: Goalkeeper

International career
Years	Team	Apps	(Gls)
1998–2006	Brazil		

Roberto Vilela, known as Robertinho (born 1969), is a Brazilian former beach soccer player who played as a goalkeeper.

== Career ==
Robertinho was a goalkeeper for the Brazil national beach soccer team from 1998 to 2006. He began as a reserve to Paulo Sérgio but assumed the starting role by 2001.

During his tenure, Brazil dominated the sport, winning multiple Beach Soccer World Championships (pre-FIFA era and early FIFA editions), with Robertinho contributing to seven titles overall.

In the 2003 Beach Soccer World Championships in Rio de Janeiro, he was named the tournament's Best Goalkeeper as Brazil defeated Spain 8–2 in the final.

He also played showbol (an indoor football variant) for Flamengo and the Brazilian national showbol team.

Post-retirement, Robertinho has worked as a commentator (e.g., for SporTV), goalkeeper coach, and academy instructor, including coordinating youth goalkeeper development at Serrano FC.

== Honours ==
Brazil
- Beach Soccer World Championships: 7 times
Individual
- Best Goalkeeper, Beach Soccer World Championships: 2003
