= Walter Paz =

Argentine footballer

Personal information
- Full name: Walter Javier Paz
- Date of birth: March 4, 1973 (age 53)
- Place of birth: Buenos Aires, Argentina
- Height: 1.65 m (5 ft 5 in)
- Position: Midfielder

Team information
- Current team: Banfield de San Pedro

Youth career
- Argentinos Juniors

Senior career*
Years	Team	Apps	(Gls)
1989–1994	Argentinos Juniors	76	(2)
1994–1995	FC Porto	0	(0)
1995	→ Gil Vicente (loan)	8	(1)
1995–1996	→ Huracán (loan)	19	(0)
1996	O'Higgins	15	(1)
1996–1997	Dundee United	0	(0)
1997–1999	All Boys	68	(1)
1999–2000	Quilmes	27	(0)
2000–2001	Brown de Arrecifes	34	(1)
2001	Cobresal	0	(0)
2002–2004	Tiro Federal	57	(8)
2005–2006	Estudiantes RC	26	(2)
2006	Gimnasia y Esgrima CdU	14	(0)
2007	Banfield San Pedro	–	(–)
2009	CAJ El Calafate	–	(–)
2010	Boxing Club	–	(–)
Total		344	(16)

International career
1989	Argentina U17	4	(0)
1991	Argentina U20	3	(0)
- * Club domestic league appearances and goals

Walter Javier Paz (born 4 March 1973 in Buenos Aires) is a former Argentine footballer who played as an attacking midfielder. He played for the Argentina Youth Squad in the 1991 FIFA World Youth Championship in which he was nominated the best midfielder.

== Career ==
A product of Argentinos Juniors, Paz went to play on FC Porto but with no success. After some loan time in other European clubs he returned to Argentina where he played mostly for second division and lower table first division teams.

Back to South America, he played for Chilean club O'Higgins in 1996 at the top division. Subsequently, he went to Scotland and joined Dundee United.

Back in Argentina, he joined All Boys. He stayed in the Argentine football, except a brief stint with Chilean club Cobresal in 2001.
