= Márcio =

Márcio is a Brazilian or Portuguese male personal name

- Márcio Melo (1906-1991), general with the Brazilian air force
- Márcio Rezende de Freitas (born 1960), Brazilian football referee
- Márcio Bittencourt (born 1964), Brazilian football defensive midfielder and coach
- Márcio Santos (born 1969), Brazilian football player, 1994 World Champion
- Márcio Garcia (born 1970), Brazilian actor and television host
- Márcio Rogério de Andrade (1971–2007), Brazilian football forward
- Márcio May (born 1972), Brazilian cyclist
- Márcio Araújo (volleyball) (born 1973), Brazilian beach volleyball player
- Márcio Amoroso (born 1974), Brazilian football forward
- Márcio Carlsson (born 1975), Brazilian tennis player
- Márcio Cazorla (born 1971), Brazilian football goalkeeper
- Márcio Mixirica (born 1975), Brazilian football striker
- Márcio Cruz (born 1978), Brazilian martial artist
- Márcio dos Santos Gaia (Santos Gaia, born 1978), Brazilian football defender
- Márcio Careca (born 1978), Brazilian rugby player
- Márcio Nobre (born 1980), Brazilian football striker and manager
- Márcio Abreu (born 1980), Portuguese football winger
- Márcio de Oliveira Barros (1981–2012), Brazilian football striker
- Márcio Luiz Silva Lopes Santos Souza (born 1981), Brazilian football goalkeeper
- Márcio Augusto dos Santos Aguiar (born 1981), Brazilian football goalkeeper
- Márcio Torres (born 1981), Brazilian tennis player
- Márcio Luiz Adurens (born 1981), Brazilian football attacking midfielder
- Márcio Diogo (born 1985), Brazilian football attacking midfielder
- Márcio Rafael Ferreira de Souza, (Rafinha, born 1985), Brazilian football right back
- Márcio Azevedo (born 1986), Brazilian football left back
- Márcio Marcelo Leite Júnior (born 1993), Brazilian football central defender
- Márcio Rosa (born 1997), Cape Verdean football goalkeeper
- Márcio Santos (born 2002), Brazilian basketball player
