= Todd Haskins =

American soccer player

Personal information
- Date of birth: August 30, 1972 (age 54)
- Place of birth: United States
- Height: 5 ft 9 in (1.75 m)
- Position: Defender

College career
Years	Team	Apps	(Gls)
1990–1991, 1993	North Carolina Tar Heels		

Senior career*
Years	Team	Apps	(Gls)
1993–1994	Raleigh Flyers		
1995	Washington Warthogs (indoor)	27	(12)
1998	Baton Rouge Bombers (indoor)		
1999	Maryland Mania	23	(2)
1999	→ D.C. United (loan)	0	(0)

International career
1989	U.S. U-16 national team		
2005	U.S. Beach Soccer Team		
- * Club domestic league appearances and goals

Todd Haskins (born August 30, 1972) is an American retired soccer defender who played most of his career in beach soccer. He was a member of the U.S. U-16 national team at the 1989 FIFA U-16 World Championship and the U.S. Beach Soccer Team at the 2005 FIFA Beach Soccer World Cup.

== Club career ==
Haskins was an outstanding player for Howard High School in Ellicott City, Maryland. He was the 1990 Gatorade Player of the Year and a Parade Magazine High School All American. In 1989, he was a member of the U.S. U-16 national team at the 1989 FIFA U-16 World Championship. The U.S. went 1–1–1, with Haskin scoring a goal in the 2–2 tie with Australia. In 1990, he entered the University of North Carolina where he played three years on the men's soccer team, 1990–1991 and again in 1993. During the summer of 1993, Haskins played the collegiate off-season with the Raleigh Flyers of the USISL. After completing his senior year at UNC, Haskings signed a professional contract with the Flyers for the 1995 season. In 1995, Haskins played for the Washington Warthogs of the Continental Indoor Soccer League. On February 7, 1996, the Columbus Crew selected Haskins in the 15th round (141st overall) in the 1996 MLS Inaugural Player Draft, but the Crew did not offer him a contract. He then played beach soccer, had an unsuccessful trial with AZ Alkmaar and on May 28, 1998, signed with the Baton Rouge Bombers of the Eastern Indoor Soccer League. In June, he suffered a season ending cheek injury. In December 1998, he was the first player signed by the expansion Maryland Mania of the A-League. The Mania played one season then folded. In July 1999 Haskins briefly went on loan to D.C. United when the team had several players injured. He did not play any games before returning to the Mania. In 2005, Haskins was a member of the U.S. Beach Soccer Team at the 2005 FIFA Beach Soccer World Cup.

== Coaching career ==
Haskins currently coaches the U16 Bethesda Arsenal club team in Bethesda Maryland. He also coaches a Maryland state Olympic Development Program team, (ODP). He is also the assistant coach of the St. Johns College High School Team, along with head coach Philip Gyau.
