= Claudio Paris =

Argentine footballer

Claudio "El Rulo" Paris
Personal information
- Full name: Claudio Martin Paris
- Date of birth: 31 March 1971 (age 55)
- Place of birth: Argentina
- Position: Midfielder

Senior career*
Years	Team	Apps	(Gls)
–1996	Estudiantes de La Plata	145	(10)
1997–2001	Newell's Old Boys	104	(6)
2001–2002	A.C. Perugia Calcio	6	(0)
2002–2003	Racing Club de Avellaneda	3	(0)
- * Club domestic league appearances and goals

Claudio Paris (born 31 March 1971 in Argentina) is an Argentinean retired footballer.
