= Bernard Aryee =

Ghanaian footballer

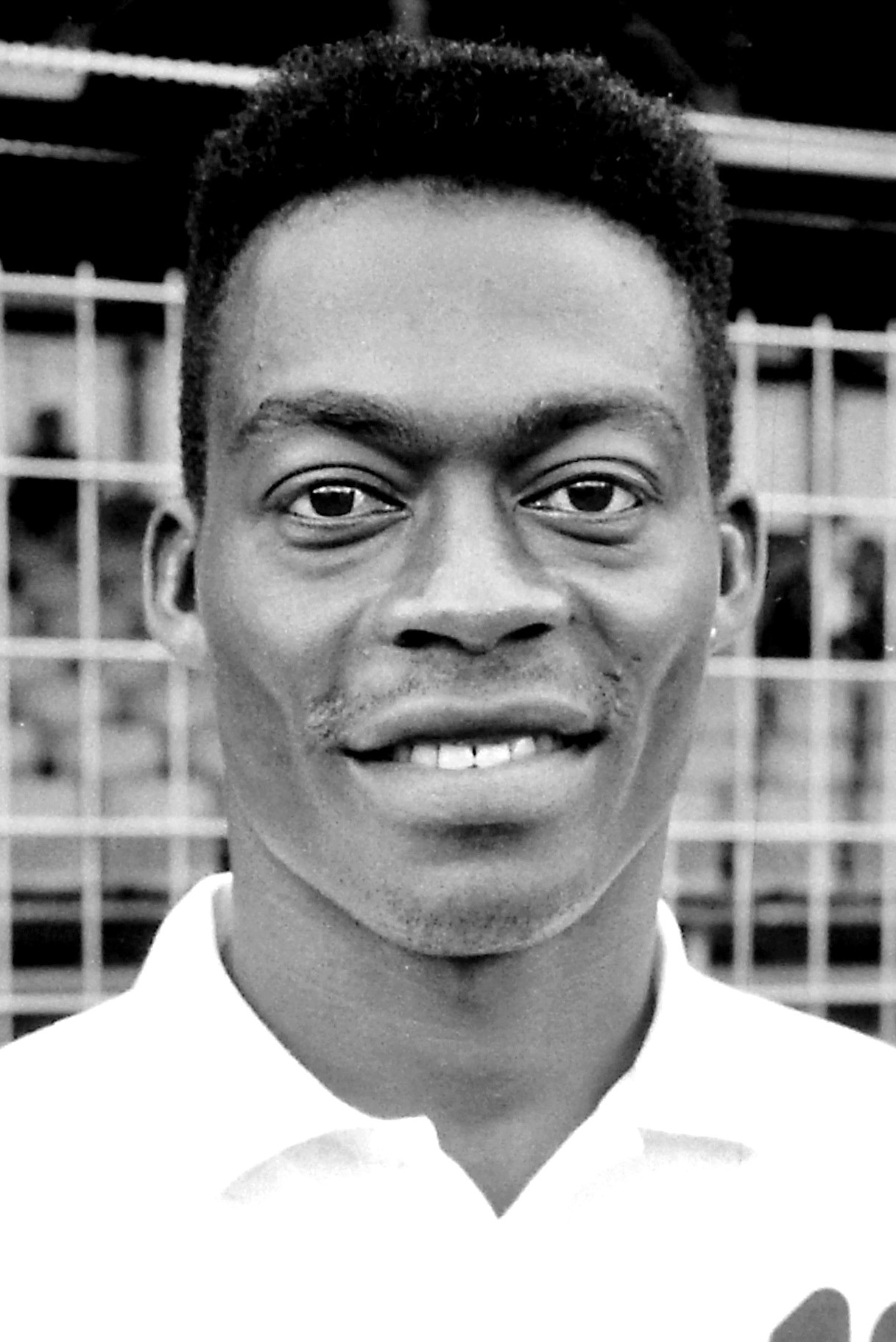
- Bernard Aryee in 1995

Personal information
- Full name: Bernard Nii Aryee
- Date of birth: 23 April 1973 (age 53)
- Place of birth: Accra, Ghana
- Position: Midfielder

Senior career*
Years	Team	Apps	(Gls)
1988–1990	Great Olympics		
1991–1994	Hearts of Oak		
1995–1996	AZ Alkmaar		
1996–1997	FC Zwolle		
1997–1998	FC Marine Castle		
1999–2000	Liberty Professionals		

International career
1990–1996	Ghana U-23		
1996–1999	Ghana	6	(0)
- * Club domestic league appearances and goals

Medal record

Men's association football

Representing Ghana

Olympic Games
Bronze medal – third place	1992 Barcelona	Team competition

Bernard Nii Aryee (born 23 April 1973) is a football player from Ghana, who was a member of the Men's National Team that won the bronze medal at the 1992 Summer Olympics in Barcelona, Spain.

== Career ==
Bernard's previous clubs have been: Accra Great Olympics, Ghana (1989–1990); Accra Hearts of Oak, Ghana (1991–1994); AZ Alkmaar, Holland (1995–1996); FC Zwolle, Holland (1996–1997); FC Marine Castle, Singapore (1997–1998) and Liberty Professionals F.C., Ghana (1998–2000).

== Titles ==
Career Championship winning records include: National League Champions, Ghana (1991 and 1992); National FA Champions, Ghana (1993); Olympic Games, Barcelona, Spain (bronze medal, 1992); Pre-Olympics Tournament, Cairo, Egypt (gold medalists-1992).

== Coaching career ==
During his playing Career with the Liberty Professionals F.C., Bernard was also assigned with the responsibility of coaching their Youth Team. He held that position with distinction, and a winning record for five years.

== International ==
Bernard has been a member of the Ghanaian National Teams that participated in Tournaments such as: World Youth Cup (Scotland 1989), Pre-Olympic tourney (Egypt 1992), Olympic Games qualifiers (1991–1992), African Championships Club Competition (1991–1993), African Cup Winners Cup Competition (1994).

== Personal ==
Bernard Aryee resides in the US, and holds soccer coaching clinics for kids in and around the Maryland, Virginia, New Jersey, and DC Metro areas, and also the head coach of the Washington DC black meteors soccer team, based in Silver Spring, Maryland.
