= Manuel Rodríguez Navarro =

Spanish wheelchair basketball player

Personal information
- Nationality: Spanish

Sport
- Country: Spain
- Sport: Wheelchair basketball

Manuel Rodriguez Navarro (born 8 January 1969 in Las Palmas de Gran Canaria) is a wheelchair basketball athlete from Spain. He has a physical disability: he is a 4-point wheelchair basketball player. He played wheelchair basketball at the 1996 Summer Paralympics. His team was fourth.
