= José Castro (footballer) =

Chilean footballer

Personal information
- Full name: José Ignacio Castro Mena
- Date of birth: 13 October 2001 (age 25)
- Place of birth: Santiago, Chile
- Height: 1.78 m (5 ft 10 in)
- Position: Left-back

Team information
- Current team: Huachipato (on loan from Universidad de Chile)
- Number: 46

Youth career
- Universidad de Chile

Senior career*
Years	Team	Apps	(Gls)
2021–	Universidad de Chile	36	(0)
2025–	→ Huachipato (loan)	2	(0)
- * Club domestic league appearances and goals as of 11 December 2025

José Ignacio Castro Mena (born 13 October 2001) is a Chilean professional footballer who plays as a left-back for Chilean Primera División side Huachipato on loan from Universidad de Chile.

== Club career ==
A left-back from the Universidad de Chile youth system, Castro made his professional debut in a 2021 Copa Libertadores match against San Lorenzo played in Argentina on 18 March, since the team had many players out in the context of COVID-19 pandemic. In March 2022, he signed his first professional contract.

In August 2025, Castro was loaned out to Huachipato on a deal for two and a half seasons.

== Honours ==
Universidad de Chile

- Copa Chile: 2024

Huachipato

- Copa Chile: 2025
