= 1995 FIFA World Youth Championship squads =

FIFA championship roster

== Group A ==
=== Brazil ===
Head coach: (Brazil) Júlio César Leal

No.	Pos.	Player	Date of birth (age)	Caps	Club
1	GK	Fábio Noronha	12 October 1975 (aged 19)		(Brazil) Flamengo
2	DF	Dedimar	27 January 1976 (aged 19)		(Brazil) Vitória
3	DF	Fabiano	4 August 1975 (aged 19)		(Brazil) Flamengo
4	DF	Marcelo	20 August 1975 (aged 19)		(Brazil) Portuguesa
5	MF	Zé Elias	25 September 1976 (aged 18)		(Brazil) Corinthians
6	DF	Léo Inácio	14 September 1976 (aged 18)		(Brazil) Flamengo
7	FW	Reinaldo	1 July 1976 (aged 18)		(Brazil) Atlético Mineiro
8	MF	Élder	19 July 1976 (aged 18)		(Brazil) Vasco da Gama
9	FW	Caio	16 August 1975 (aged 19)		(Brazil) São Paulo
10	MF	Claudinho	8 March 1976 (aged 19)		(Brazil) Bragantino
11	MF	Gláucio	11 November 1975 (aged 19)		(Brazil) Portuguesa
12	GK	Nílson	26 December 1975 (aged 19)		(Brazil) Vitória
13	DF	César Belli	16 November 1975 (aged 19)		(Brazil) Portuguesa
14	DF	Alcir	14 November 1977 (aged 17)		(Brazil) Atlético Mineiro
15	MF	Sérgio Vinícius	25 October 1976 (aged 18)		(Brazil) Flamengo
16	MF	Murilo	30 December 1975 (aged 19)		(Brazil) Internacional
17	FW	Luizão	14 November 1975 (aged 19)		(Brazil) Guarani
18	MF	Denílson	24 August 1977 (aged 17)		(Brazil) São Paulo

=== Qatar ===
Head coach: (Denmark) Jørgen Erik Larsen

No.	Pos.	Player	Date of birth (age)	Caps	Club
1	DF	Amiri Ali Mohammed	18 August 1977 (aged 17)		QAT
2	DF	Ahmed Al Rumaihi	22 October 1977 (aged 17)		QAT
3	DF	Mohamed Salem	15 August 1975 (aged 19)		QAT
4	DF	Abdulrahman Mubarak Al Kuwari	27 April 1977 (aged 17)		(Qatar) Al Rayyan Sports Club
5	DF	Adel Hassan Jassim	8 September 1977 (aged 17)		QAT
6	DF	Hassan Al Ansari	1 November 1976 (aged 18)		QAT
7	MF	Abdulla Al Ishaq	7 December 1976 (aged 18)		QAT
8	FW	Mohammed Salem Al-Enazi	22 November 1976 (aged 18)		(Qatar) Al Rayyan Sports Club
9	FW	Hassan Al Harami	10 July 1975 (aged 19)		QAT
10	MF	Mohammed Nasser	15 May 1977 (aged 17)		QAT
11	MF	Waleed Al Khanji	14 October 1977 (aged 17)		QAT
12	DF	Ahmed Jassim	6 December 1977 (aged 17)		QAT
13	DF	Mohammed Abdulrahman	27 December 1976 (aged 18)		QAT
14	DF	Rashid Al Muhazza	9 September 1976 (aged 18)		QAT
15	DF	Ali Al Binali	27 August 1977 (aged 17)		QAT
16	FW	Ahmed Al Mulla	16 November 1977 (aged 17)		QAT
17	FW	Rashid Al Dosari	1 October 1977 (aged 17)		QAT
18	GK	Hassan Rahman	20 October 1976 (aged 18)		QAT

=== Russia ===
Head coach: (Russia) Aleksandr Kuznetsov (ru)

No.	Pos.	Player	Date of birth (age)	Caps	Club
1	GK	Mikhail Kharin	17 June 1976 (aged 18)		(Russia) Torpedo Moscow
2	MF	Vladislav Radimov	26 November 1975 (aged 19)		(Russia) CSKA Moscow
3	DF	Aleksandr Lipko	18 August 1975 (aged 19)		(Russia) Spartak Moscow
4	MF	Sergei Lysenko	1 September 1976 (aged 18)		(Russia) CSKA Moscow
5	DF	Yevgeni Chumachenko	18 December 1975 (aged 19)		(Russia) Rotor Volgograd
6	DF	Konstantin Lepyokhin	2 October 1975 (aged 19)		(Russia) Druzhba Maykop
7	DF	Andrei Solomatin	9 September 1975 (aged 19)		(Russia) Lokomotiv Moscow
8	FW	Sergei Semak	27 February 1976 (aged 19)		(Russia) CSKA Moscow
9	MF	Dmitri Khokhlov	22 December 1975 (aged 19)		(Russia) CSKA Moscow
10	FW	Andriy Demchenko	20 August 1976 (aged 18)		(Netherlands) Ajax
11	FW	Roman Oreshchuk	2 September 1975 (aged 19)		(Russia) Rostselmash Rostov
12	GK	Igor Gusev	1 November 1975 (aged 19)		(Russia) Saturn Ramenskoe
13	MF	Aleksandr Berketov	24 December 1975 (aged 19)		(Russia) Rotor Volgograd
14	MF	Yevgeni Zezin	14 April 1976 (aged 18)		(Russia) Zenit Saint Petersburg
15	FW	Andrei Krivov	24 September 1976 (aged 18)		(Russia) Rotor Volgograd
16	FW	Aleksandr Pateyev	23 April 1976 (aged 18)		(Russia) Volgar-Gazprom Astrakhan
17	FW	Valentin Yegunov	23 April 1976 (aged 18)		(Russia) Zenit Saint Petersburg
18	MF	Mikhail Yudin	18 January 1976 (aged 19)		(Russia) Metallurg Lipetsk

=== Syria ===
Head coach: (Russia) Anatoly Baidachny

No.	Pos.	Player	Date of birth (age)	Caps	Goals	Club
1	GK	Abdul Fattah Kader	2 August 1975 (aged 19)			(Syrian Football Association) Al Wahda
2	DF	Mouaz Kabbani	30 August 1977 (aged 17)			(Syrian Football Association) Al-Jaish SC
3	DF	Marwan Muna	4 September 1976 (aged 18)			(Syrian Football Association) Al Foutowa
4	MF	Hassan Abbas	24 January 1974 (aged 21)			(Syrian Football Association) Al-Karamah SC
5	DF	Tarek Jabban	11 December 1975 (aged 19)			(Syrian Football Association) Al-Jaish SC
6	MF	Abdul Malek Azizi	7 October 1975 (aged 19)			(Syrian Football Association) Al- Horriya
7	MF	Abdel Kader Rifai	18 April 1973 (aged 21)			(Syrian Football Association) Al-Karamah SC
8	FW	Nader Joukhadar	19 October 1977 (aged 17)			(Syrian Football Association) Al-Wathba SC
9	MF	Loay Taleb	9 August 1975 (aged 19)			(Syrian Football Association) Al-Wahda SC
10	MF	Nihad Al Boushi	8 March 1973 (aged 22)			(Syrian Football Association) Al-Ittihad SC
11	MF	Ahmed Kurdughli	25 September 1975 (aged 19)			(Syrian Football Association) Tishreen SC
12	FW	Mahmoud Mahmalji	3 April 1976 (aged 19)			(Syrian Football Association) Al Karamah
13	DF	Mohamad Mustabha	20 September 1977 (aged 17)			(Syrian Football Association) Al Majd
14	MF	Khaled Al Zaher	2 September 1972 (aged 22)			(Syrian Football Association) Al Hurriya SC
15	DF	Ghassan Kerali	3 August 1975 (aged 19)			(Syrian Football Association) Hulteen SC
16	GK	Omar Akel	15 November 1977 (aged 17)			(Syrian Football Association) Al-Jaish SC
17	MF	Ammar Rihawi	20 June 1975 (aged 19)			(Syrian Football Association) Al-Ittihad SC
18	FW	Hani Shaker	5 December 1977 (aged 17)			(Syrian Football Association) Al Shorta

== Group B ==
=== Burundi ===
Head coach: (Burundi) Baudouin Ribakare

No.	Pos.	Player	Date of birth (age)	Caps	Club
1	GK	Kakenge Hakizimana	21 December 1977 (aged 17)		(Burundi)
2	DF	Said Ndaraniwe	17 December 1977 (aged 17)		(Burundi)
3	MF	Juma Maulidi	25 April 1977 (aged 17)		(Burundi)
4	DF	Magnifique Ndikumana	8 February 1976 (aged 19)		(Burundi)
5	MF	Calixte Kapinga	10 May 1977 (aged 17)		(Burundi)
6	MF	Fredy Ndayishimite	16 October 1976 (aged 18)		(Burundi)
7	FW	Blaise Butunungu	16 April 1977 (aged 17)		(Burundi)
8	DF	Omar Saleh	25 August 1976 (aged 18)		(Burundi)
9	FW	Masumbuko Willonja	25 March 1976 (aged 19)		(Burundi)
10	MF	Shabani Daudi	8 April 1977 (aged 18)		(Burundi)
11	FW	Banza Rukundo	18 November 1975 (aged 19)		(Burundi)
12	FW	Félicien Mbanza	2 September 1977 (aged 17)		(Burundi) Maniema Fantastique
13	DF	Didier Bizimana	5 November 1975 (aged 19)		(Burundi)
14	DF	Morki Ahishakiye	25 October 1975 (aged 19)		(Burundi)
15	DF	Eric Karikumutima	8 September 1976 (aged 18)		(Burundi)
16	MF	Omer Ntahonkuriye	10 October 1976 (aged 18)		(Burundi)
17	FW	Juma Masudi	30 August 1977 (aged 17)		(Burundi)
18	GK	Alfred Mahigihigi	7 July 1977 (aged 17)		(Burundi)

=== Chile ===
Head coach: (Chile) Leonardo Véliz

No.	Pos.	Player	Date of birth (age)	Caps	Club
1	GK	Carlos Toro	4 February 1976 (aged 19)		(Chile) Santiago Wanderers
2	DF	Francisco Fernández	19 August 1975 (aged 19)		(Chile) Colo-Colo
3	MF	Mauricio Donoso	30 April 1975 (aged 19)		(Chile) Cobreloa
4	DF	Nelson Garrido	12 February 1977 (aged 18)		(Chile) Universidad Católica
5	DF	Jorge Vargas	8 February 1976 (aged 19)		(Chile) Huachipato
6	DF	Dion Valle	22 July 1977 (aged 17)		(Chile) Colo-Colo
7	MF	Rodrigo Valenzuela	27 November 1975 (aged 19)		(Chile) Unión Española
8	MF	Carlos Barraza	12 March 1976 (aged 19)		(Chile) Coquimbo Unido
9	MF	Alejandro Osorio	24 September 1976 (aged 18)		(Chile) O'Higgins
10	MF	Frank Lobos	25 September 1976 (aged 18)		(Chile) Colo-Colo
11	FW	Sebastián Rozental	1 September 1976 (aged 18)		(Chile) Universidad Católica
12	GK	Ariel Salas	19 October 1975 (aged 19)		(Chile) Colo-Colo
13	FW	Héctor Tapia	30 September 1977 (aged 17)		(Chile) Colo-Colo
14	MF	Cristián Uribe	1 August 1976 (aged 18)		(Chile) Huachipato
15	FW	Fernando Martel	2 October 1975 (aged 19)		(Chile) Unión San Felipe
16	MF	Mauricio Aros	9 March 1976 (aged 19)		(Chile) Deportes Concepción
17	FW	Juan Carlos Madrid	10 October 1975 (aged 19)		(Chile) Universidad Católica
18	DF	Dante Poli	15 August 1976 (aged 18)		(Chile) Universidad Católica

=== Japan ===
Head coach: (Japan) Koji Tanaka

No.	Pos.	Player	Date of birth (age)	Caps	Club
1	GK	Seiji Honda	25 February 1976 (aged 19)		(Japan) Nagoya Grampus Eight
2	DF	Tadahiro Akiba	13 October 1975 (aged 19)		(Japan) JEF United Ichihara
3	MF	Kensaku Omori	21 November 1975 (aged 19)		(Japan) Yokohama Marinos
4	DF	Ryuzo Morioka	7 October 1975 (aged 19)		(Japan) Kashima Antlers
5	MF	Naoki Matsuda	14 March 1977 (aged 18)		(Japan) Yokohama Marinos
6	MF	Nobuhisa Yamada	10 September 1975 (aged 19)		(Japan) Urawa Reds
7	MF	Koji Kumagai	23 October 1975 (aged 19)		(Japan) Kashima Antlers
8	MF	Shinji Otsuka	29 December 1975 (aged 19)		(Japan) JEF United Ichihara
9	FW	Sotaro Yasunaga	20 April 1976 (aged 18)		(Japan) Yokohama Marinos
10	MF	Suguru Ito	7 September 1975 (aged 19)		(Japan) Kokushikan University
11	FW	Susumu Oki	23 February 1976 (aged 19)		(Japan) Sanfrecce Hiroshima
12	MF	Takahiro Yamanishi	2 April 1976 (aged 19)		(Japan) Júbilo Iwata
13	DF	Shigenori Hagimura	31 July 1976 (aged 18)		(Japan) Kashiwa Reysol
14	FW	Mitsunori Yabuta	2 May 1976 (aged 18)		(Japan) Verdy Kawasaki
15	MF	Hidetoshi Nakata	22 January 1977 (aged 18)		(Japan) Bellmare Hiratsuka
16	DF	Kazuhiro Suzuki	16 November 1976 (aged 18)		(Japan) JEF United Ichihara
17	MF	Daisuke Oku	7 February 1976 (aged 19)		(Japan) Júbilo Iwata
18	GK	Takashi Shimoda	28 November 1975 (aged 19)		(Japan) Sanfrecce Hiroshima

=== Spain ===
Head coach: (Spain) Andoni Goikoetxea

No.	Pos.	Player	Date of birth (age)	Caps	Club
1	GK	Javier López Vallejo (c)	22 September 1975 (aged 19)		(Spain) Osasuna
2	DF	Alberto Sánchez	9 May 1976 (aged 18)		(Spain) Real Madrid B
3	DF	David Cordón	12 November 1975 (aged 19)		(Spain) Atlético Madrid B
4	MF	Luis Martínez	10 November 1975 (aged 19)		(Spain) Real Madrid B
5	DF	César Martín	3 April 1977 (aged 18)		(Spain) Real Oviedo
6	MF	Luis Cuartero	17 August 1975 (aged 19)		(Spain) Real Zaragoza
7	FW	Raúl	27 June 1977 (aged 17)		(Spain) Real Madrid
8	MF	Míchel Salgado	22 October 1975 (aged 19)		(Spain) Celta Vigo
9	MF	Iván de la Peña	6 May 1976 (aged 18)		(Spain) Barcelona B
10	MF	Roger	15 December 1976 (aged 18)		(Spain) Barcelona B
11	FW	Joseba Etxeberria	5 September 1977 (aged 17)		(Spain) Real Sociedad
12	MF	Míchel	30 October 1975 (aged 19)		(Spain) Rayo Vallecano
13	GK	Manu Martínez	6 January 1976 (aged 19)		(Spain) Barcelona B
14	FW	Fernando Morientes	5 April 1976 (aged 19)		(Spain) Albacete Balompié
15	MF	Raúl Ochoa	14 August 1975 (aged 19)		(Spain) Bilbao Athletic
16	DF	Toni Velamazán	22 January 1977 (aged 18)		(Spain) Barcelona B
17	DF	Mingo	10 June 1977 (aged 17)		(Spain) Barcelona B
18	GK	Gorka López	7 January 1976 (aged 19)		(Spain) CD Tenerife B

== Group C ==
=== Argentina ===
Head coach: (Argentina) José Pekerman

No.	Pos.	Player	Date of birth (age)	Caps	Club
1	GK	Joaquín Irigoytía	15 August 1975 (aged 19)		(Argentina) River Plate
2	DF	Sebastián Pena	3 July 1976 (aged 18)		(Argentina) Argentinos Juniors
3	DF	Federico Domínguez	13 August 1976 (aged 18)		(Argentina) Vélez Sársfield
4	DF	Gustavo Lombardi	10 September 1975 (aged 19)		(Argentina) River Plate
5	MF	Mariano Juan	17 May 1976 (aged 18)		(Argentina) River Plate
6	DF	Juan Pablo Sorín	5 May 1976 (aged 18)		(Argentina) Argentinos Juniors
7	FW	Francisco Guerrero	23 August 1977 (aged 17)		(Argentina) Independiente
8	MF	Guillermo Larrosa	23 August 1975 (aged 19)		(Argentina) Gimnasia y Esgrima La Plata
9	MF	Carlos Arangio	27 May 1977 (aged 17)		(Argentina) Racing Club
10	MF	Ariel Ibagaza	27 October 1976 (aged 18)		(Argentina) Lanús
11	FW	Leonardo Biagini	13 April 1977 (aged 18)		(Argentina) Newell's Old Boys
12	GK	Gastón Pezzuti	9 February 1976 (aged 19)		(Argentina) Racing Club
13	DF	Diego Crosa	13 April 1976 (aged 19)		(Argentina) Newell's Old Boys
14	DF	Cristian Díaz	18 May 1976 (aged 18)		(Argentina) Platense
15	MF	Andrés Garrone	13 May 1976 (aged 18)		(Argentina) Rosario Central
16	MF	Julio Bayon	24 November 1975 (aged 19)		(Argentina) Rosario Central
17	MF	Walter Coyette	28 January 1976 (aged 19)		(Argentina) Lanús
18	FW	Cristián Chaparro	19 October 1975 (aged 19)		(Argentina) Ferro Carril Oeste

=== Honduras ===
Head coach: (Honduras) Luis Paz Camargo

No.	Pos.	Player	Date of birth (age)	Caps	Club
1	GK	José Barahona	6 January 1977 (aged 18)		(Honduras)
2	DF	Luis Lagos	28 December 1975 (aged 19)		(Honduras)
3	DF	David Zambrano	13 April 1976 (aged 19)		(Honduras)
4	MF	Amado Guevara	2 May 1976 (aged 18)		(Spain) Real Valladolid
5	MF	Waldir Vargas	29 November 1976 (aged 18)		(Honduras)
6	DF	Fabio Ulloa	20 August 1976 (aged 18)		(Honduras) CD Olimpia
7	MF	Héctor Rodríguez	24 December 1976 (aged 18)		(Honduras)
8	FW	Jorge Obando	9 August 1975 (aged 19)		(Honduras)
9	FW	Orvin Cabrera	20 February 1977 (aged 18)		(Honduras) Real España
10	MF	Mario Rubí	9 March 1977 (aged 18)		(Honduras) Olimpia
11	FW	Alex Bailey	2 July 1976 (aged 19)		(Honduras)
12	GK	Jerry Ashman	26 July 1976 (aged 18)		(Honduras)
13	MF	Wilmer Peralta	17 February 1977 (aged 18)		(Honduras)
14	MF	Juan Coello	21 May 1977 (aged 17)		(Honduras) Motagua
15	MF	Crisanto Bernárdez	7 December 1975 (aged 19)		(Honduras)
16	DF	Ninrod Medina	26 August 1976 (aged 18)		(Honduras) Motagua
17	MF	Luis Oseguera	6 May 1976 (aged 18)		(El Salvador) CD Luis Angel Firpo
18	MF	Edwin Medina	12 April 1977 (aged 18)		(Honduras) C.D. Marathón

=== Netherlands ===
Head coach: (Netherlands) Rinus Israël

No.	Pos.	Player	Date of birth (age)	Caps	Club
1	GK	Rody Hoegee	18 January 1977 (aged 18)	=	(Netherlands) Feyenoord
2	DF	Mendel Witzenhausen	3 January 1976 (aged 19)		(Netherlands) VVV
3	DF	Denny Landzaat	6 May 1976 (aged 18)		(Netherlands) Ajax
4	DF	Melchior Schoenmakers	22 October 1975 (aged 19)		(Netherlands) Heerenveen
5	DF	Tristan Ooms	10 August 1975 (aged 19)		(Netherlands) AZ
6	MF	Rob Gehring	19 January 1976 (aged 19)		(Netherlands) Ajax
7	MF	Björn van der Doelen	24 August 1976 (aged 18)		(Netherlands) PSV
8	MF	Tommie van der Leegte	27 March 1977 (aged 18)		(Netherlands) PSV
9	FW	Nordin Wooter	24 August 1976 (aged 18)		(Netherlands) Ajax
10	MF	Kiki Musampa	20 July 1977 (aged 17)		(Netherlands) Ajax
11	FW	Dave van den Bergh	7 May 1976 (aged 18)		(Netherlands) Ajax
12	MF	Arno Knapen	20 March 1976 (aged 19)		(Netherlands) Twente
13	GK	Jim van Fessem	7 August 1976 (aged 18)		(Netherlands) Willem II
14	DF	Menno Willems	10 March 1977 (aged 18)		(Netherlands) Ajax
15	MF	Ron Pander	5 March 1977 (aged 18)		(Netherlands) Heerenveen
16	FW	Bjorn Schurink	21 September 1976 (aged 18)		(Netherlands) FC Twente
17	MF	Pascal Boer	18 March 1976 (aged 19)		(Netherlands) VVV
18	FW	Wilfred Bouma	15 June 1978 (aged 16)		(Netherlands) PSV

=== Portugal ===
Head coach: (Portugal) Nelo Vingada

No.	Pos.	Player	Date of birth (age)	Caps	Goals	Club
1	GK	Quim	13 November 1975 (aged 19)	5	0	(Portuguese Football Federation) Braga
2	MF	Madureira	5 February 1976 (aged 19)	5	0	(Portuguese Football Federation) Salgueiros
3	FW	Edgar Ribeiro	23 December 1975 (aged 19)	4	1	(Portuguese Football Federation) União de Lamas
4	DF	José Soares	23 February 1976 (aged 19)	3	0	(Portuguese Football Federation) Benfica
5	FW	Agostinho	15 September 1975 (aged 19)	4	1	(Portuguese Football Federation) Vitória de Guimarães
6	MF	Mário Silva	24 April 1977 (aged 17)	3	0	(Portuguese Football Federation) Boavista
7	MF	Ramires	22 March 1976 (aged 19)	2	0	(Portuguese Football Federation) Alverca
8	DF	Mariano	21 November 1975 (aged 19)	5	0	(Portuguese Football Federation) Espinho
9	DF	Beto	3 May 1976 (aged 18)	4	1	(Portuguese Football Federation) Campomaiorense
10	DF	Diogo	15 November 1975 (aged 19)	2	0	(Portuguese Football Federation) Alverca
11	FW	Nuno Gomes	5 July 1976 (aged 18)	4	0	(Portuguese Football Federation) Boavista
12	GK	Nuno Avelino	5 February 1976 (aged 19)	3	0	(Portuguese Football Federation) Beira-Mar
13	DF	Alfredo Bóia	28 November 1975 (aged 19)	4	0	(Portuguese Football Federation) Paços de Ferreira
14	MF	Carlos Filipe	15 September 1975 (aged 19)	5	1	(Portuguese Football Federation) União de Lamas
15	MF	Bruno Caires	2 April 1976 (aged 19)	3	0	(Portuguese Football Federation) Belenenses
16	MF	Jorge Silva	4 December 1975 (aged 19)	4	1	(Portuguese Football Federation) Boavista
17	MF	Rui Óscar	17 December 1975 (aged 19)	4	0	(Portuguese Football Federation) Boavista
18	FW	Dani	2 November 1976 (aged 18)	5	1	(Portuguese Football Federation) Sporting CP

== Group D ==
=== Australia ===
Head coach: (Australia) Les Scheinflug

No.	Pos.	Player	Date of birth (age)	Caps	Club
1	GK	Clint Bolton	22 August 1975 (aged 19)		(Australia) Brisbane Strikers
2	DF	Con Anthopoulos	20 May 1976 (aged 18)		(Australia) South Melbourne
3	DF	Paul Bilokapic	8 August 1976 (aged 18)		(Australia) Sydney United
4	DF	Mark Rudan	27 August 1975 (aged 19)		(Australia) Sydney United
5	DF	Richard Plesa	8 January 1976 (aged 19)		(Australia) Sydney United
6	DF	Ignazio Pollari	12 September 1975 (aged 19)		(Australia) Marconi Stallions
7	MF	Ufuk Talay	26 March 1976 (aged 19)		(Australia) Marconi Stallions
8	MF	Robert Enes	22 August 1975 (aged 19)		(Australia) Melbourne Knights
9	FW	Nick Lazarevski	29 October 1975 (aged 19)		(Australia) Melbourne Knights
10	FW	Mark Viduka	9 October 1975 (aged 19)		(Australia) Melbourne Knights
11	MF	Josip Skoko	10 December 1975 (aged 19)		(Australia) North Geelong Warriors
12	DF	John Angelovski	16 July 1976 (aged 18)		(Australia) Melbourne Zebras
13	MF	Dino Mennillo	22 August 1975 (aged 19)		(Australia) Adelaide City
14	DF	Joe Vrkic	31 August 1976 (aged 18)		(Australia) Sydney United
15	MF	Andrew Vlahos	20 April 1976 (aged 18)		(Australia) Heidelberg United
16	FW	Robbie Middleby	9 August 1975 (aged 19)		(Australia) Wollongong City
17	FW	Jonothan Carter	12 August 1976 (aged 18)		(Australia) Albion Redsox
18	GK	Les Pogliacomi	3 May 1976 (aged 18)		(Australia) Marconi Stallions
19	GK	Steve Angelov	30 September 1975 (aged 19)		(Australia) Wollongong City

=== Cameroon ===
Head coach: (Cameroon) Jean Manga-Onguene

No.	Pos.	Player	Date of birth (age)	Caps	Club
1	GK	Faustin Etoundi	25 July 1977 (aged 17)		(Cameroon)
2	DF	Guy Ngaha	9 December 1975 (aged 19)		(Cameroon)
3	DF	Pierre Womé	26 March 1979 (aged 16)		(Cameroon) Canon Yaoundé
4	MF	Serge Ebode	18 October 1976 (aged 18)		(Cameroon)
5	DF	Gerart Mboo	3 May 1977 (aged 17)		(Cameroon)
6	MF	Paul Ngomoe	6 October 1979 (aged 15)		(Cameroon)
7	FW	Valery Ntamag	15 September 1976 (aged 18)		(Cameroon)
8	MF	Joseph Tchango	28 November 1978 (aged 16)		(Cameroon) Cotonsport
9	FW	Macdonald Ndiefi	2 October 1976 (aged 18)		(Cameroon)
10	MF	Augustine Simo	18 September 1978 (aged 16)		(Italy) Torino
11	MF	Laurent Sanda	30 August 1976 (aged 18)		(Cameroon)
12	DF	Joseph Sosthene Tam Bikai	6 July 1978 (aged 16)		(Cameroon)
13	DF	Caliste Ngnindon	25 March 1978 (aged 17)		(Cameroon)
14	FW	Malam Halidou	8 July 1976 (aged 18)		(Cameroon)
15	DF	Geremi	20 December 1978 (aged 16)		(Cameroon) RC Bafoussam
16	GK	Bruno Hameni Njeukam	30 September 1978 (aged 16)		(Cameroon) Racing FC Bafoussam
17	FW	Basile Essa Mvondo	19 April 1978 (aged 16)		(Cameroon) Aigle
18	MF	Joël Epalle	20 February 1978 (aged 17)		(Cameroon) Union Douala

=== Costa Rica ===
Head coach: (Costa Rica) Luis Roberto Sibaja

No.	Pos.	Player	Date of birth (age)	Caps	Club
1	GK	Lester Morgan Suazo	2 May 1976 (aged 18)		(Costa Rica) A.D. Guanacasteca
2	DF	Edrick Diaz	3 October 1975 (aged 19)		(Costa Rica) A.D. Guanacasteca
3	DF	Jervis Drummond Johnson	8 September 1976 (aged 18)		(Costa Rica) Saprissa
4	DF	Alejandro Sanchez Aguilar	14 August 1976 (aged 18)		(Costa Rica) Carmelita
5	DF	Jose Antonio Torres Gonzalez	5 October 1975 (aged 19)		(Costa Rica) Herediano
6	DF	Alfredo Morales Chaves	16 September 1977 (aged 17)		(Costa Rica) Saprissa
7	MF	Carlos Rodriguez Fajardo	8 August 1976 (aged 18)		(Costa Rica) A.D. Guanacasteca
8	MF	Kenneth Baltodano	2 August 1976 (aged 18)		(Costa Rica) Herediano
9	FW	Paulo Cesar Wanchope	31 July 1976 (aged 18)		(Costa Rica) Herediano
10	FW	Jafet Soto Molina	1 April 1976 (aged 19)		(Mexico) Morelia
11	FW	Jewison Bennett Grant	2 November 1976 (aged 18)		(Costa Rica) Cartagines
12	FW	Cesar Augusto Martinez Bolaños	12 October 1976 (aged 18)		(Costa Rica) Uruguay de Coronado
13	MF	Norberto Barrantes	20 September 1976 (aged 18)		(Costa Rica) Herediano
14	DF	Try Anthony Bennett Grant	5 August 1975 (aged 19)		(Costa Rica) Saprissa
15	DF	Diego Box Thomas	25 August 1977 (aged 17)		(Costa Rica) Puriscal
16	GK	Jose Manuel Herrera Solano	11 March 1976 (aged 19)		(Costa Rica) Paraíso
17	FW	Gerald Drummond Johnson	8 September 1976 (aged 18)		(Costa Rica) Saprissa
18	MF	Harold Amed Wallace McDonald	9 July 1975 (aged 19)		(Mexico) Xacatepec

=== Germany ===
Head coach: (Germany) Hans-Jürgen Dörner

No.	Pos.	Player	Date of birth (age)	Caps	Club
1	GK	Simon Jentzsch	4 May 1976 (aged 18)		(Germany) Bayer Uerdingen
2	MF	Frank Riethmann	9 December 1975 (aged 19)		(Germany) Borussia Dortmund
3	MF	Markus Stern	18 January 1976 (aged 19)		(Germany) Hertha BSC
4	DF	Mustafa Doğan	1 January 1976 (aged 19)		(Germany) Bayer Uerdingen
5	MF	Christoph Chylla	6 May 1976 (aged 18)		(Germany) Bayer Leverkusen
6	DF	Andreas Egler	9 March 1976 (aged 19)		(Germany) Borussia Mönchengladbach
7	MF	Carsten Hinz	7 August 1975 (aged 19)		(Germany) Borussia Dortmund
8	MF	Tobias Büttner	23 August 1976 (aged 18)		(Germany) VfB Stuttgart
9	FW	Marcel Rath	3 September 1975 (aged 19)		(Germany) Hertha BSC
10	MF	Frank Gerster	15 April 1976 (aged 18)		(Germany) Bayern Munich
11	FW	Christian Fährmann	5 October 1975 (aged 19)		(Germany) Hertha BSC
12	GK	Conny Wieland	8 October 1975 (aged 19)		(Germany) BSV Brandenburg
13	DF	Tobias Sumelka	1 September 1975 (aged 19)		(Germany) Schalke 04
14	DF	Jan Walle	30 August 1975 (aged 19)		(Germany) TeBe Berlin
15	MF	Sven Fischer	7 January 1977 (aged 18)		(Germany) Darmstadt 98
16	MF	Sebastian Helbig	25 April 1977 (aged 17)		(Germany) Bayer Leverkusen
17	FW	Marco Küntzel	22 January 1976 (aged 19)		(Germany) Hansa Rostock
18	FW	Til Bettenstaedt	20 January 1976 (aged 19)		(Germany) Schalke 04
