= 1992 UEFA European Under-16 Championship =

Ευρωπαϊκό πρωτάθλημα ποδοσφαίρου Παίδων 1992 1992 Avrupa 16 Yaş Altı Futbol Şampiyonası

Tournament details
- Host country: Cyprus
- Dates: 7–17 May
- Teams: 16 (from 1 confederation)

Final positions
- Champions: Germany (2nd title)
- Runners-up: Spain
- Third place: Italy
- Fourth place: Portugal

Tournament statistics
- Matches played: 28
- Goals scored: 64 (2.29 per match)

The 1992 UEFA European Under-16 Championship was the 10th edition of the UEFA's European Under-16 Football Championship. Players born on or after 1 August 1975 were eligible to participate in this competition. Cyprus hosted the 16 teams that contested 7–17 May 1992.

Spain unsuccessfully defended its third title.

Germany won their second overall title, their first after its reunification.

== Participants ==
- Cyprus
- Denmark
- Finland
- France
- Germany
- Hungary
- Netherlands
- Northern Ireland
- Israel
- Italy
- Republic of Ireland
- Portugal
- Romania
- Scotland
- Spain
- Yugoslavia

== Results ==
=== First stage ===
==== Group A ====
Team	Pld	W	D	L	GF	GA	GD	Pts
Italy	3	2	0	1	7	2	+5	4
Yugoslavia	3	2	0	1	4	5	−1	4
Finland	3	1	0	2	2	4	−2	2
Denmark	3	1	0	2	2	4	−2	2

7 May 1992

Finland	0–1	Denmark

Nicosia

7 May 1992

Yugoslavia	0–4	Italy

Nicosia

9 May 1992

Finland	0–2	Yugoslavia

Nicosia

9 May 1992

Denmark	0–2	Italy

Nicosia

11 May 1992

Finland	2–1	Italy

Nicosia

11 May 1992

Denmark	1–2	Yugoslavia

Nicosia

==== Group B ====
Team	Pld	W	D	L	GF	GA	GD	Pts
Spain	3	2	1	0	6	2	+4	5
Netherlands	3	2	0	1	6	2	+4	4
Republic of Ireland	3	0	2	1	1	3	−2	2
Romania	3	0	1	2	1	7	−6	1

7 May 1992

Romania	1–3	Spain

Paralimni

7 May 1992

Republic of Ireland	0–2	Netherlands

Ayia Napa

9 May 1992

Romania	0–0	Republic of Ireland

Dherynia

9 May 1992

Spain	2–0	Netherlands

Paralimni

11 May 1992

Romania	0–4	Netherlands

Dherynia

11 May 1992

Spain	1–1	Republic of Ireland

Ayia Napa

==== Group C ====
Team	Pld	W	D	L	GF	GA	GD	Pts
Germany	3	3	0	0	6	2	+4	6
Scotland	3	2	0	1	6	2	+4	4
Cyprus	3	0	1	2	1	5	−4	1
Northern Ireland	3	0	1	2	2	6	−4	1

7 May 1992

Germany	3–1	Northern Ireland

Larnaca

7 May 1992

Scotland	3–0	Cyprus

Larnaca

9 May 1992

Germany	1–0	Scotland

Larnaca

9 May 1992

Northern Ireland	0–0	Cyprus

Larnaca

11 May 1992

Germany	2–1	Cyprus

Larnaca

11 May 1992

Northern Ireland	1–3	Scotland

Larnaca

==== Group D ====
Team	Pld	W	D	L	GF	GA	GD	Pts
Portugal	3	2	1	0	4	2	+2	5
Hungary	3	1	1	1	4	4	0	3
Israel	3	1	1	1	3	3	0	3
France	3	0	1	2	1	3	−2	1

7 May 1992

France	1–2	Portugal
Marie 32'		Agostinho 42'; Ramires 56'

Limassol

7 May 1992

Israel	3–2	Hungary

Limassol

9 May 1992

France	0–0	Israel

Paphos

9 May 1992

Portugal	1–1	Hungary
João Peixe 47'		Lisztes 44'

Paphos

11 May 1992

France	0–1	Hungary

Limassol

11 May 1992

Portugal	1–0	Israel
Silva 14'

Paphos

=== Semi-finals ===
14 May 1992

Spain	3–1	Portugal
de la Peña 48'; Pérez 53', 73'		Carlos Filipe 10'

Limassol
14 May 1992

Italy	0–0	Germany
Penalties
	5–6

Limassol

=== Third place match ===
16 May 1992

Italy	1–0	Portugal
Totti 54' (pen.)

Antonis Papadopoulos Stadium, Larnaca
Referee: Andreas Georgiou (Cyprus)

=== Final ===
17 May 1992

Germany	2–1	Spain
Bettenstaedt 38'; Hinz 64'		16' Iván Pérez

Ammochostos Stadium, Larnaca
Referee: Leslie Mottram (Scotland)
