= Madureira =

Madureira may refer to:

- Madureira, Rio de Janeiro, a neighborhood of Rio de Janeiro, Brazil
- Madureira Esporte Clube, a Brazilian football team
- Madureira (surname)
