= Madureira (surname) =

Madureira is a Portuguese surname. Notable people with the surname include:

- Alex Madureira (born 1976), Brazilian politician
- Augusto Madureira (born 1967), Portuguese journalist and songwriter
- Cezinha de Madureira (born 1973), Brazilian politician
- Doka Madureira (born 1984), Brazilian footballer
- Joe Madureira (born 1974), American comics writer and artist
- Jorge Madureira (born 1976), Portuguese footballer
- Marcelo Madureira (born 1958), Brazilian comedian
