= Christian Fährmann =

German footballer

Personal information
- Full name: Christian Fährmann
- Date of birth: 5 October 1975 (age 51)
- Place of birth: West Germany
- Height: 1.82 m (6 ft 0 in)
- Position: Midfielder

Youth career
- 1980–1992: SV Tasmania 73 Neukölln
- 1992–1993: Tennis Borussia Berlin

Senior career*
Years	Team	Apps	(Gls)
1993–1996	Hertha BSC II		
1995–1998	Hertha BSC	55	(4)
1998–2000	Karlsruher SC	41	(3)
2000–2002	1. FC Union Berlin	13	(0)
2001	→ Fortuna Düsseldorf (loan)	12	(1)
2002–2003	SV Tasmania-Gropiusstadt 1973	11	(2)
2003	Tennis Borussia Berlin	13	(3)
2003–2007	Hallescher FC	68	(11)
2007–2009	VfB Sangerhausen		

International career
1998	Germany U-21	5	(2)
- * Club domestic league appearances and goals

Christian Fährmann (born 5 October 1975) is a former professional German football midfielder.

He represented Germany at the 1995 FIFA World Youth Championship.
