= Alfredo Bóia =

Portuguese footballer (born 1975)

Personal information
- Full name: Alfredo Daniel Lopes Bóia
- Date of birth: 28 November 1975 (age 50)
- Place of birth: Espinho, Portugal
- Height: 1.85 m (6 ft 1 in)
- Position: Defender

Youth career
- 1986–1989: Sporting Espinho
- 1989–1990: Porto
- 1990–1992: Sporting Espinho
- 1992–1994: Sporting

Senior career*
Years	Team	Apps	(Gls)
1994	Sporting	0	(0)
1994–1995	Amora	21	(0)
1995–1996	Paços de Ferreira	10	(0)
1996–1997	Aves	7	(0)
1997–1998	Lourinhanense	29	(4)
1998–1999	Esposende	28	(1)
1999–2000	União Leiria	10	(0)
2000–2001	Paços de Ferreira	9	(1)
2001–2003	Nacional	26	(0)
2003–2004	Ovarense	5	(1)
2004–2005	Atlético CP	25	(3)
2005–2006	U. Micaelense	3	(0)
2007	Sarawak		

International career
1991	Portugal U-15	3	(1)
1991–1992	Portugal U-16	13	(0)
1993–1994	Portugal U-18	12	(1)
1995–1996	Portugal U-20	11	(0)
1996	Portugal U-21	1	(0)
Medal record
Men's football
Representing Portugal
FIFA U-20 World Cup
Third place	1995 Qatar
- * Club domestic league appearances and goals

Alfredo Daniel Lopes Bóia (born 28 November 1975) is a former Portuguese football player.

== Club career ==
He made his Primeira Liga debut for União Leiria on 24 October 1999 in a game against Campomaiorense.

== Honours ==
Portugal Under-18

- UEFA European Under-18 Championship: 1994
