= Félicien Mbanza =

Burundian footballer

Personal information
- Full name: Félicien M'Banza
- Date of birth: 6 June 1977 (age 49)
- Place of birth: Bujumbura, Burundi

Youth career
- 1993–1994: Fantastique Bujumbura

Senior career*
| Years | Team | Apps | (Gls) |
| 1995–1996 | Fantastique Bujumbura | | |
| 1996–1997 | SC Bümpliz 78 | | |
| 1997–1998 | Young Fellows Juventus | | |
| 1998–2000 | SR Delémont | 41 | (11) |
| 2000–2001 | Besançon RC | 14 | (0) |
| 2001–2002 | FC Alle | | |
| 2002–2003 | Étoile Carouge | | |
| 2003–2005 | Croix de Savoie Gaillard | 28 | (3) |

International career
| 2002–2003 | Burundi | 4 | (0) |
- * Club domestic league appearances and goals

Félicien M'Banza (born 6 June 1977 in Bujumbura) is a Burundian former professional footballer who played as a striker.

== International career ==
Mbanza was member of the Burundi national football team and presented the Burundian U-20 by 1995 FIFA World Youth Championship in Qatar and played three matches.
