= Carlos Barraza =

Chilean footballer

Personal information
- Full name: Carlos Patricio Barraza Berenguela
- Date of birth: 12 March 1976 (age 50)
- Place of birth: La Serena, Chile
- Height: 1.65 m (5 ft 5 in)
- Position: Midfielder

Youth career
- Academia Santa Inés
- Deportes La Serena

Senior career*
| Years | Team | Apps | (Gls) |
| 1994 | Deportes La Serena | 25 | (1) |
| 1995–1999 | Universidad Católica | 2 | (0) |
| 1996 | → Coquimbo Unido (loan) | 19 | (1) |
| 1997 | → Deportes Temuco (loan) | 17 | (0) |
| 1998 | → Deportes La Serena (loan) | 16 | (1) |
| 2000 | Deportes La Serena | 30 | (1) |
| 2001–2002 | Unión San Felipe | 54 | (4) |
| 2003 | Cobresal | 37 | (2) |
| 2004 | Deportes La Serena | 12 | (0) |
| 2004 | Cobresal | 2 | (0) |
| 2005–2006 | Deportes La Serena | 1 | (0) |

International career
| 1995 | Chile U20 | 9 | (0) |
| 1995 | Chile Pan American | 3 | (0) |
- * Club domestic league appearances and goals

Carlos Patricio Barraza Berenguela (born 12 March 1976) is a Chilean former footballer who played as a midfielder.

== Club career ==
Born in La Serena, Chile, Barraza was trained at Academia Santa Inés and the local club, Deportes La Serena. He made his professional debut in 1994 and was selected as the Revelation Player of the season. The next year, he signed with Universidad Católica and won the 1995 Copa Chile.

Known as a midfielder, Barraza spent most of his career in the Chilean Primera División playing for Deportes La Serena, Universidad Católica, Coquimbo Unido, Deportes Temuco, Unión San Felipe and Cobresal.

== International career ==
Barraza was included in the first Chile squad list by Xabier Azkargorta in January 1995. Shortly after, he represented Chile U20 in the 1995 South American Championship and the 1995 FIFA World Cup.

In the same year, Barraza made 3 appearances for Chile at the Pan American Games, where they reached the quarter-finals.
