= Nuno Avelino =

Portuguese footballer

Personal information
- Full name: Nuno Miguel Mesquita Avelino
- Date of birth: 5 February 1976 (age 50)
- Place of birth: Porto, Portugal
- Height: 1.80 m (5 ft 11 in)
- Position: Goalkeeper

Team information
- Current team: FC Geneva

Youth career
- 1985–1994: Porto

Senior career*
Years	Team	Apps	(Gls)
1994–1996	Felgueiras	1	(0)
1996–2000	Penafiel	110	(0)
2000–2002	Beira-Mar	15	(0)
2002–2003	Leça	18	(0)
2003	Marco	6	(0)
2003–2008	Penafiel	36	(0)
2008–2009	Freamunde	3	(0)
2009–2010	Boavista	29	(0)
2010–2011	Varzim	7	(0)
2011–2012	Tondela	25	(0)
2012–2013	Nun'Alvares	18	(0)
2013–2014	SC Rio Tinto	6	(0)
2014–	FC Geneve	0	(0)

International career
1991–1992	Portugal U16	9	(0)
1992–1993	Portugal U17	3	(0)
1993–1994	Portugal U18	4	(0)
1994–1996	Portugal U20	6	(0)
Medal record
Men's football
Representing Portugal
FIFA U-20 World Cup
Third place	1995 Qatar
- * Club domestic league appearances and goals as of 24 May 2015

Nuno Miguel Mesquita Avelino (born 5 February 1976), is a Portuguese professional footballer who plays for FC Geneve as a goalkeeper.

== Club career ==
Born in Porto, Avelino played for Porto youth ranks.

== International career ==
After representing his country at youth level from the under-16s upwards to the under-18s, Avelino helped the national under-20s finish third in the 1995 FIFA World Youth Championship playing two games.

== Honours ==
=== Country ===
Portugal

- FIFA U-20 World Cup: Third place 1995
