= Diogo Matos =

Portuguese footballer

Diogo
Personal information
- Full name: Diogo Maria de Sousa Franco de Matos
- Date of birth: 15 November 1975 (age 50)
- Place of birth: Lisbon, Portugal
- Height: 1.80 m (5 ft 11 in)
- Position: Defensive midfielder

Youth career
- 1985–1988: Dramático Cascais
- 1988–1989: Estoril
- 1989–1994: Sporting CP

Senior career*
Years	Team	Apps	(Gls)
1994–1995	Alverca		
1995–1996	Académica	15	(0)
1996–2001	Alverca	103	(4)
2001–2004	Sporting CP	4	(0)
2002–2003	→ Las Palmas (loan)	3	(0)
2003–2004	→ Alverca (loan)	20	(0)
Total		145	(4)

International career
1995	Portugal U20	9	(0)
Medal record
Men's football
Representing Portugal
FIFA U-20 World Cup
Third place	1995 Qatar
- * Club domestic league appearances and goals

Diogo Maria de Sousa Franco de Matos (born 15 November 1975), known simply as Diogo, is a Portuguese retired footballer who played as a defensive midfielder.

== Club career ==
Born in Lisbon, Diogo finished his football formation with local Sporting Clube de Portugal, but left the club at the age of 18, making his professional debuts with F.C. Alverca in the third division. In the 1995 summer he moved to Académica de Coimbra in the second level and, one year later, returned to Alverca who now was in the same tier, promoting to the Primeira Liga at the end of his second season.

From 1999 to 2001, Diogo appeared in 48 top division games (44 starts) and scored three goals, helping Alverca finish in midtable on both occasions. He was then rebought by Sporting, but was nothing more than a fringe player for the Laszlo Bölöni-led side, who went on to win the 2002 national championship; during his contract, he was also loaned to UD Las Palmas in Spain and former club Alverca, and retired from football in June 2004, aged only 28.

== International career ==
Diogo played all the matches but one for the Portugal under-20 team that finished third in the 1995 FIFA World Youth Championship, held in Qatar.

== Honours ==
- Primeira Liga: 2001–02
- Taça de Portugal: 2001–02
