= Cristián Chaparro =

Argentine footballer

Cristian Chaparro
Personal information
- Full name: Raúl Cristian Chaparro
- Date of birth: October 19, 1975 (age 51)
- Place of birth: Buenos Aires, Argentina
- Height: 1.72 m (5 ft 8 in)
- Position: Midfielder

Senior career*
Years	Team	Apps	(Gls)
1996-2000	Ferro Carril Oeste	158	(19)
2000-2001	Huracán	25	(1)
2001-2002	Cobresal	13	(5)
2002	Barcelona SC	21	(6)
2003	Audax Italiano	7	(2)
2003-2004	Municipal	26	(8)
2004	Jorge Wilstermann	13	(1)
2005	La Gomera FC		
2005	Cúcuta Deportivo		
2006	Deportes Quindío	6	(0)
2007	San José	17	(2)
2007	Almagro	9	(0)
2008	Municipal		
2009–2010	Aurora FC		

International career
1995	Argentina U20		
- * Club domestic league appearances and goals

Raúl Cristian Chaparro (born October 19, 1975, in San Isidro (Buenos Aires), Argentina) is a former Argentine footballer who played for clubs of Argentina, Chile, Bolivia, Ecuador, Colombia and Guatemala. He played as a midfielder.

== Club career ==
=== Teams ===
- (Argentina) Ferro Carril Oeste 1996–2000
- (Argentina) Huracán 2000–2001
- (Chile) Cobresal 2001–2002
- (Ecuador) Barcelona 2002
- (Chile) Audax Italiano 2003
- (Guatemala) Municipal 2003–2004
- (Bolivia) Jorge Wilstermann 2004
- (Guatemala) La Gomera FC 2005
- (Colombia) Cúcuta Deportivo 2005
- (Colombia) Deportes Quindío 2006
- (Bolivia) San José 2007
- (Argentina) Almagro 2007
- (Guatemala) Municipal 2008
- (Guatemala) Aurora 2009–2010

== International career ==
Chaparro was a squad member of the Argentina under-20 squad that won the 1995 FIFA World Youth Championship.

== Personal life ==
He is the son of the former Argentine international footballer Raúl Chaparro and the nephew of Rolando Chaparro, brother of Raúl.
