= Didier Bizimana =

Burundian footballer

Personal information
- Date of birth: May 11, 1975 (age 51)
- Place of birth: Bujumbura, Burundi
- Position: Central defender

Senior career*
| Years | Team | Apps | (Gls) |
| 2004–2005 | APR FC | | |
| 2006–2007 | SVN | | |

International career^{‡}
- Burundi U20
| 1998–2003 | Burundi | 14 | (3) |
- * Club domestic league appearances and goals as of 9 November 2007 ‡ National team caps and goals as of 9 November 2007

Didier Bizimana (born 11 May 1975) is a Burundian retired central defender who last played with SVN before in summer 2007 retired.

== Career ==
He played for Rwandese side APR FC from 1995 to 2007, before moving to Dutch Tweede Klasse G team SVN.

== International career ==
He was a member of the Burundi national football team and represented the Burundian U-20 at the 1995 FIFA World Youth Championship in Qatar, where he played in three games.
