= Cezinha de Madureira =

Brazilian politician (born 1973)

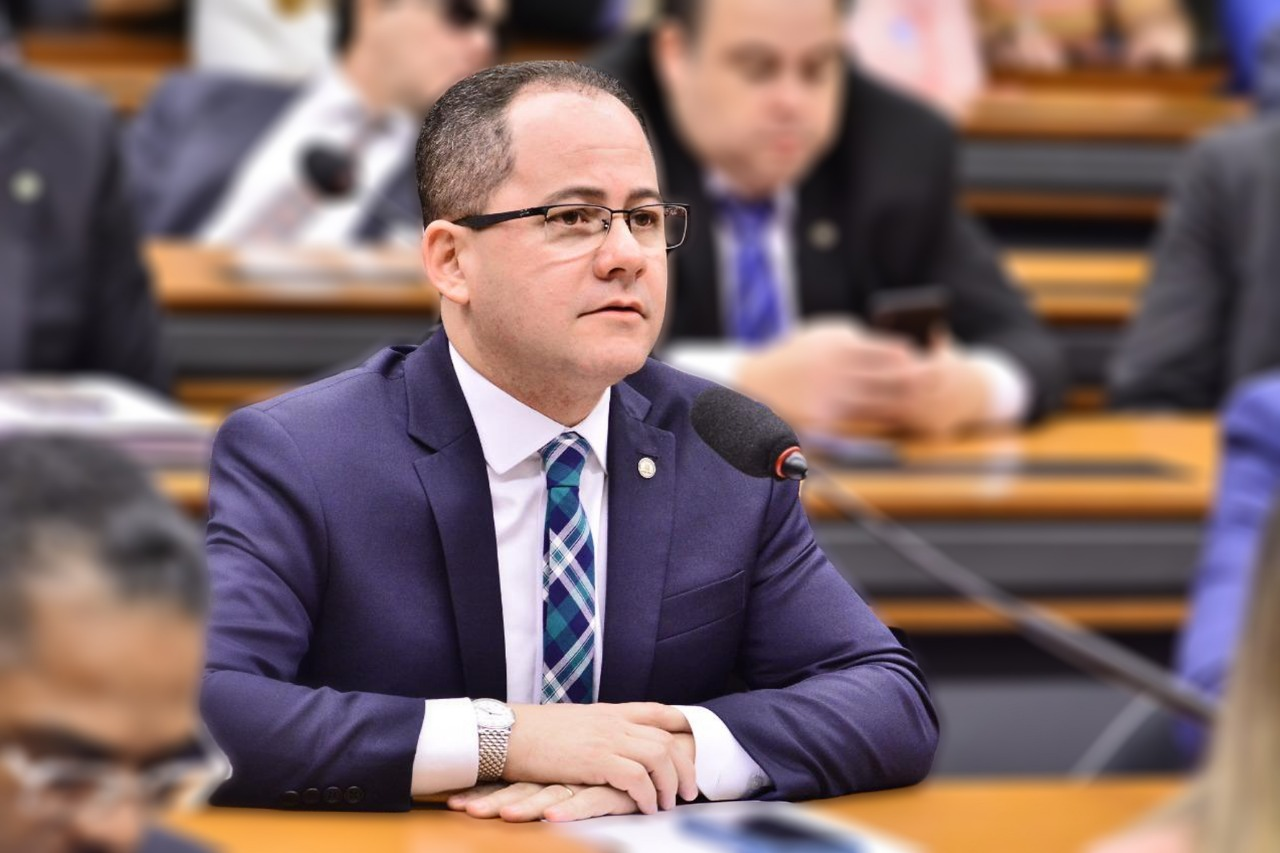
- Madureira in 2019

Member of the Chamber of Deputies
- Incumbent
- Assumed office 1 February 2019
- Constituency: São Paulo

Personal details
- Born: 12 December 1973 (age 52)
- Party: PL (since 2026)

Antonio Cezar Correia Freire (born 12 December 1973), better known as Cezinha de Madureira, is a Brazilian politician serving as a member of the Chamber of Deputies since 2019. From 2015 to 2019, he was a member of the Legislative Assembly of São Paulo.
