= Joaquín Irigoytía =

Argentine footballer (born 1975)

Personal information
- Full name: Joaquín Andrés Irigoytía
- Date of birth: August 15, 1975 (age 51)
- Place of birth: Gualeguaychú, Entre Ríos Province, Argentina
- Position: Goalkeeper

Youth career
- River Plate

Senior career*
Years	Team	Apps	(Gls)
1995–1997	River Plate		
1998	Hércules CF		
1999–2002	Colón		
2003	Cerro Porteño		
2003	Club de Fútbol Cobras		
2004	Club Almagro		
2005	Lanús		
2006	Aldosivi		

International career
1995	Argentina U20		
- * Club domestic league appearances and goals

Joaquín Andrés Irigoytía (born 15 August 1975 in Gualeguaychú, Entre Ríos, Argentina) is an Argentine professional footballer who played for clubs of the Argentina, Paraguay, Mexico and Spain.

Irigoytía began playing football in the youth system of Club Atlético River Plate. He retired after 11 seasons of playing professional football.

He won the Bronze Ball at the 1995 FIFA U-20 World Cup.

== Clubs ==
- River Plate 1995–1997
- Hércules 1998
- River Plate 1995–1997
- Colón 1999–2002
- Cerro Porteño 2003
- Club de Fútbol Cobras 2003
- Club Almagro 2004
- Lanús 2005
- Aldosivi 2006
