= Walter Coyette =

Argentine footballer and manager

Personal information
- Full name: Walter Gastón Coyette
- Date of birth: 28 January 1976 (age 50)
- Place of birth: Avellaneda, Argentina
- Height: 1.75 m (5 ft 9 in)
- Position: Midfielder

Team information
- Current team: Huracán (youth manager)

Senior career*
Years	Team	Apps	(Gls)
1994–1997	Lanús		(7)
1997–1998	Leganés	1	(0)
1998–1999	Platense	22	(4)
1999–2000	Lanús		
2000–2001	Atlas	34	(3)
2001–2002	Lanús	19	(1)
2002–2003	Argentinos Juniors	30	(4)
2003	Unión de Santa Fe	8	(0)
2004	Deportivo Quito	14	(2)
2004–2005	Juventud Antoniana	29	(6)
2005–2006	Huracán	32	(10)
2006	Quilmes	11	(0)
2007–2008	Huracán	29	(3)
2008–2009	Chacarita Juniors	26	(2)

Managerial career
- 2010: Gimnasia LP (assistant)
- 2011: Santos Laguna (assistant)
- 2011–2012: Huracán (assistant)
- 2015–2016: Argentina U15
- 2016–2017: Chacarita Juniors
- 2018: San Martín SJ
- 2018–2019: San Martín Tucumán
- 2019: Unión La Calera
- 2020–2022: Alvarado
- 2022: Deportivo Morón
- 2022: Quilmes
- 2023: Aldosivi
- 2024–: Huracán (youth)
- 2024: Huracán (interim)
- * Club domestic league appearances and goals

Walter Gastón Coyette (born 28 January 1976 in Avellaneda) is an Argentine football manager and former player who played as a midfielder. He is the current manager of Huracán's youth setup.

== Career ==
Coyette started his career with Club Atlético Lanús in 1994, he made 113 appearances and scored 7 goals during his three spells with the club. In 1995, he was part of the Argentina U-20 squad that won the 1995 FIFA World Youth Championship and in 1996 he helped Lanús to win the Copa CONMEBOL. Throughout his career, he played for clubs in Argentina, Spain, Mexico and Ecuador.

== Coaching career ==
Coyette started his coaching career at Club de Gimnasia y Esgrima La Plata in 2010 as assistant manager for Diego Cocca. He later followed Cocca as his assistant to Santos Laguna in Mexico in February 2011 and then Club Atlético Huracán in September 2011.

Coyette then hired as a field assistant coach for the U15, U17 and U20 youth national teams, before becoming head coach of the U15 national team in 2015. On 10 June 2016, Coyette was appointed manager of Chacarita Juniors on a one-year deal, the same team where he had retired as a professional player. After a period of bad results, Coyette decided to resign in December 2017. After his time at Chacarita, he assumed as coach of San Martín de San Juan, which he directed for only 14 games before being fired after a bad start. Days after his departure, he took charge of San Martín de Tucumán. He was fired in February 2019.

On 17 September 2019, Coyette was appointed manager of Chilean club Unión La Calera. On 5 December 2019 it was confirmed, that Coyette had left the position for personal reasons.

Returning to Argentina after his spell in Chile, Coyette was appointed manager of Alvarado at the end of June 2020. After a period of bad results, Coyette decided to step down from his position on 28 March 2022.

== Titles ==
Season	Team	Title
1995	Argentina U-20	World Youth Cup
1996	Lanús	Copa CONMEBOL
