= Joseph Tchango =

Cameroonian footballer (born 1978)

Personal information
- Full name: Joseph Marie Tchango
- Date of birth: 28 November 1978 (age 47)
- Place of birth: Douala, Cameroon
- Height: 1.76 m (5 ft 9 in)
- Position: Midfielder

Senior career*
Years	Team	Apps	(Gls)
1996–1997	Coton Sport		
1997	Tecos	8	(0)
1998	Liverpool Montevideo		
1999–2001	Jaguares de Colima		
2001	Tecos	10	(0)
2003–2004	Coton Sport		
2004–2005	MKE Ankaragücü	7	(0)
2005	Coton Sport		

International career
1995–1997	Cameroon	14	(1)
- * Club domestic league appearances and goals

Joseph Marie Tchango (born 28 November 1978) is a Cameroonian former professional footballer who played as a midfielder. At club level, he played for clubs in Cameroon, Mexico, Uruguay and most notably for MKE Ankaragucu in turkey.
