= Gastón Pezzuti =

Argentine footballer

Personal information
- Full name: Gastón Fernando Pezzuti Carro
- Date of birth: 9 February 1976 (age 50)
- Place of birth: Buenos Aires, Argentina
- Height: 1.85 m (6 ft 1 in)
- Position: Goalkeeper

Youth career
- 1989–1997: Racing Club

Senior career*
Years	Team	Apps	(Gls)
1997–2004	Racing Club	16	(0)
2002–2003	→ Lanús (loan)	11	(0)
2005	Deportes Concepción	22	(0)
2005–2006	Instituto	23	(0)
2006–2007	Real Oviedo	12	(0)
2007–2008	Atlético Rafaela	11	(0)
2008–2009	Gimnasia de Jujuy	28	(0)
2009–2012	Atlético Nacional	118	(0)
2013	Rosario Central	2	(0)
Total		243	(0)

International career
1995	Argentina U20	1	(0)
- * Club domestic league appearances and goals

Gastón Fernando Pezzuti Carro (born 9 June 1976) is an Argentine former footballer who played as goalkeeper. He previously played in Argentina, Chile, Colombia and Spain.

Pezzuti was member of the Argentine squad that won the 1995 FIFA World Youth Championship in Qatar.

== Club career ==
Pezzuti began his career at Argentine giant Racing Club; he was promoted to the first team in 1997, two years after winning the 1995 FIFA World Youth Championship held in Qatar. He made his competitive debut in the 1–1 draw against Ferro Carril Oeste. In 2002, he was loaned to Lanús, and then returned to Racing on June of the next year.

In 2005, Pezzuti was signed to Chilean Primera División side Deportes Concepción, this being his first transfer to a foreign club. He made his debut for the purples in a 2–0 away win over Coquimbo Unido in a league game. Pezzuti was the first-team goalkeeper of a good Concepción team that qualified to the quarter-finals of the championship.

After his spell in Chile, he returned to his country to play in the recently promoted team in the Argentine Primera División Instituto de Córdoba and then he joined Spanish club Real Oviedo, remaining in Europe a short time. Pezzuti returned to his country, to play for Atlético de Rafaela and Gimnasia y Esgrima de Jujuy.

=== Atlético Nacional ===
On 8 June 2009, Pezzuti joined Primera División de Colombia team Atlético Nacional, signing a one-year contract. One of the factors that helped in his transfer to the verdolaga club was the signing of his former coach of Lanús, Ramón Cabrero, who managed the player at that club in 2003 and requested Pezzuti as the club's first goalkeeper. He made his club debut on 10 July 2009 in a 1–1 draw with La Equidad.

Because his good performances for the club, Pezzuti was promoted to captain of the club for the 2010 season, that was disappointing for Atlético, failing to win the championship, one of the season's objectives. Pezzuti was supposed to leave the team, as his contract ended in 2011, but shortly after it was renewed for one more season.

In 2011, Pezzuti was established as figure and idol of the team, after saving three penalties during the 2011 Apertura final's penalty kicks against La Equidad, winning the championship.

== Honours ==
=== Club ===
Racing Club

- Primera División de Argentina: 1

2001 Apertura

Atlético Nacional

- Primera División de Colombia: 1

2011 Apertura

=== International ===
Argentina U20

- FIFA World Youth Championship: 1

1995
