= Jorge Madureira =

Portuguese footballer

Personal information
- Full name: Jorge Manuel Catarino Madureira
- Date of birth: 5 February 1976 (age 50)
- Place of birth: Matosinhos, Portugal
- Height: 1.72 m (5 ft 8 in)
- Position: Midfielder

Youth career
- 1986–1994: Porto

Senior career*
Years	Team	Apps	(Gls)
1994	Porto	1	(0)
1994–1995	Leça	5	(0)
1995–1996	Gil Vicente	8	(0)
1996–1998	Aves	57	(9)
1998–1999	Académica	1	(0)
1999–2000	Esposende	17	(1)
2000–2001	Penafiel	21	(0)
2001–2002	Vilanovense	24	(4)
2002–2004	Salgueiros	16	(0)
2004–2005	Pedras Rubras	28	(3)
2005–2008	Leça		
2010–2012	Dragões Sandinenses		
2012–2013	Nun´Alvares		

International career
1989–1992	Portugal U16	29	(2)
1992–1993	Portugal U17	6	(0)
1993–1994	Portugal U18	14	(2)
1994–1996	Portugal U20	15	(1)
1996	Portugal U21	1	(0)
Medal record
Men's football
Representing Portugal
FIFA U-20 World Cup
Third place	1995 Qatar
- * Club domestic league appearances and goals

Jorge Manuel Catarino Madureira (born 5 February 1976) is a Portuguese retired footballer who played as a central midfielder.

== Club career ==
Born in Matosinhos, Madureira joined FC Porto's youth system at the age of 10. In the 1993–94 season he made his debut with the first team, starting in a 0–0 home draw against S.C. Beira-Mar on 2 June 1994 in what would be his only competitive appearance.

Subsequently, Madureira played for Leça FC (Primeira Liga, only five matches) and Gil Vicente FC (Segunda Liga), spending the next two years with C.D. Aves in the second division. He returned to the top flight for the 1998–99 campaign, but only featured once for Académica de Coimbra – a 0–5 home loss to F.C. Alverca – who also suffered relegation as last.

In the following seasons, Madureira represented A.D. Esposende, F.C. Penafiel and Vilanovense FC, then signed a contract with second-tier club S.C. Salgueiros. After one year with F.C. Pedras Rubras in division three, he returned to Leça for three additional campaigns, helping the club to return to that level in his second year and retiring professionally in June 2008, at the age of 32.

== International career ==
Madureira won 15 caps for the Portugal under-20 team, adding another appearance with the under-21s. He played all the matches for the former side at the 1995 FIFA World Youth Championship, in a third-place finish.
