= Léster Morgan =

Costa Rican footballer (1976-2002)

- Morgan at the Rosabal Cordero stadium

Personal information
- Full name: Léster Morgan Suazo
- Date of birth: 2 May 1976
- Place of birth: Santa Cruz de Guanacaste, Costa Rica
- Date of death: 1 November 2002 (aged 26)
- Place of death: San Rafael de Heredia, Costa Rica
- Height: 1.83 m (6 ft 0 in)
- Position: Goalkeeper

Senior career*
Years	Team	Apps	(Gls)
1995–1996	Guanacasteca		
1996–1999	Herediano		
1999–2000	Venados de Yucatán		
2000–2002	Herediano		

International career
1999–2002	Costa Rica	6	(0)
- * Club domestic league appearances and goals

Léster Morgan Suazo (2 May 1976 – 1 November 2002) was a Costa Rican professional footballer who played as a goalkeeper.

== Club career ==
Born in Santa Cruz de Guanacaste. He tried his luck as a sweeper and center-forward before turning to the role of goalkeeper. He made his professional debut for Guanacasteca on 10 September 1995 against Belén and joined Herediano for the 1996–97 season. He had been unlucky with injuries, which often struck him just as his international career seemed set to take off. He had a brief season in Mexico with Venados de Yucatán before returning to Costa Rica.

== International career ==
Morgan was a member of the Costa Rican squad in the 1995 World Youth Cup in Qatar.

Morgan made six appearances for the senior Costa Rica national football team and was a participant at the 2002 FIFA World Cup in South Korea and Japan. He made his debut for the Ticos in a friendly against Jamaica on 24 February 1999 and collected his sixth and final cap against Colombia just before the 2002 World Cup Finals.

== Personal life ==
Morgan had a humble upbringing in Tamarindo, Costa Rica. He was raised by a single mother, Victoria and His Aunt, Miriam. Morgan was described as knowing no stranger, funny, innovative, kind, genuine and charming. Soccer was Morgan's outlet from the world and he persisted to practice daily, whether it was by himself or with others. In 1998, Morgan married Maria Ryan Hernandez, with whom he had one daughter. Morgan experienced a series of injuries later on in his career, leading to a change in behavior. Although his career accelerated, highlighted by his attendance with the Costa Rica national team at the 2002 FIFA World Cup.

== Death ==
Morgan committed suicide on 31 October 2002 in San Rafael de Heredia. His death took Costa Rica by surprise and shook fans across the nation. The reason for his suicide has been speculated in the national media, with the chronic traumatic encephalopathy diagnosis considered a contributing factor.
