= Igor Gusev =

Russian footballer and coach (born 1975)

Personal information
- Full name: Igor Alekseyevich Gusev
- Date of birth: 1 November 1975 (age 50)
- Height: 1.91 m (6 ft 3 in)
- Position: Goalkeeper

Youth career
- FShM Moscow

Senior career*
Years	Team	Apps	(Gls)
1991	FC Zvezda Moscow	0	(0)
1992–1996	FC Dynamo Moscow	0	(0)
1992–1996	→ FC Dynamo-d Moscow	44	(0)
1994–1996	→ FC Dynamo-2 Moscow	40	(0)
1997–1999	FC Saturn Ramenskoye	7	(0)
1999	→ FC Saturn-d Ramenskoye	13	(0)
2000	FC Vityaz Podolsk (amateur)		
2000	FC Neftekhimik Nizhnekamsk	4	(0)
2001	Roma Bălți		
2002	FC Neftekhimik Nizhnekamsk	9	(0)
2003	FC Zhenis	20	(0)
2004	FC Neftekhimik Nizhnekamsk	39	(0)
2005	FC Sochi-04	5	(0)
2005–2007	FC Nara-Desna Naro-Fominsk	76	(0)
2008	FC Spartak Shchyolkovo	31	(0)
2009–2010	FC Olimp-SKOPA Zheleznodorozhny		
2011–2012	FC Olimp Fryazino		

Managerial career
- 2009: FC Nara-ShBFR Naro-Fominsk (administrator)
- 2010: FC Nara-ShBFR Naro-Fominsk (assistant)
- * Club domestic league appearances and goals

Igor Alekseyevich Gusev (Russian: Игорь Алексеевич Гусев; born 1 November 1975) is a Russian professional football coach and a former player.

== Biography ==
=== Club career ===
Gusev was a pupil of the Moscow Youth Football School. In 1991, he was announced for the senior team of the FSM, which played under the name "Zvezda", but did not enter the field in official matches.

Since 1992, he played for the reserve team of Dynamo Moscow, and also played for the farm team, which played in the third league at the same time as the blue and white reserve team. In total, Dynamo played more than 80 matches for the reserve teams. In 1997, he moved to Saturn Ramenskoye, played seven matches in the first division in his first season, but then lost his place on the team and played only for the reserve team. Since 2000, he has played intermittently for Neftekhimik Nizhnekamsk.

In 2003, he joined Kazakhstan's Zhenis. He played his debut match in the top league of Kazakhstan on May 20, 2003 against Yelimaya. In total, during the season he took part in 20 championship matches, one Kazakhstan Cup game and two UEFA Cup matches. At the end of the season, he became the bronze medalist of the national championship with the team.

After returning to Russia, he played one more season in the first division for Neftekhimik, then played for clubs in the second division. At the end of his career, he played at the amateur level for Olymp, representing Zheleznodorozhny and Fryazino, and at the same time worked as a coach and administrator of the Nara-SHBFR club. At the age of 37, he finished his sports career.

=== National team career ===
In 1994, he played three matches in the final tournament of the junior (under 18) World Championship as part of the Russian national team, and became a bronze medalist. In 1995, he took part in the final tournament of the World Youth Championship as a member of the Russian national team (U-19).

=== Coaching career ===
He was a member of the coaching staff of the Nara-SBFR second division club. From 2019 to 2023, he worked as a goalkeeping coach at the women's CSKA Moscow. In June 2021, he served as head coach in one match after the resignation of Maxim Zinoviev. In September 2021, he again briefly became acting head coach after the resignation of Sergei Lavrentiev, but during this period the team did not hold matches. In February 2023, he left FC CSKA.
