= Reinaldo (footballer, born 1976) =

Brazilian footballer

Personal information
- Full name: Reinaldo Rosa dos Santos
- Date of birth: 1 July 1976 (age 50)
- Place of birth: Belo Horizonte, Brazil
- Height: 1.79 m (5 ft 10 1/2 in)
- Position: Forward

Youth career
- 1989–1992: Atlético Mineiro

Senior career*
Years	Team	Apps	(Gls)
1993–1995	Atlético Mineiro	4	(4)
1995–1996	Parma	0	(0)
1995–1996	→ Anderlecht (loan)	2	(0)
1996	Palmeiras	0	(0)
1996–1997	Hellas Verona	1	(0)
1997	Cruzeiro	0	(0)
1997	Botafogo	1	(1)
1998	Atlético Mineiro	0	(0)
1998	Bragantino	2	(1)
1999	Portuguesa		
1999	Ponte Preta	14	(1)
2000	Ceará		
2000	Atlético Paranaense	3	(0)
2001	Gama	18	(3)
2002	Sport Recife		
2002–2003	Al-Arabi		
2003	Club Guaraní		
2004	Joinville		
2005	América-RN		
2006	Ceilândia		
2006	Bahia		
2007	Vila Nova		
Total		45	(10)

International career
1995	Brazil U20	5	(3)
- * Club domestic league appearances and goals

Reinaldo Rosa dos Santos (born 1 July 1976), commonly known as Reinaldo, is a Brazilian former footballer who played as a forward.

== International career ==
Reinaldo played five games at the 1995 FIFA World Youth Championship, scoring a hat-trick in his country's 6-0 win over Syria.

== Career statistics ==
=== Club ===
As of 2018.

Club	Season	League			Cup		Continental		Other		Total	
Club	Season	Division	Apps	Goals	Apps	Goals	Apps	Goals	Apps	Goals	Apps	Goals
Atlético Mineiro	1993	Série A	1	0	0	0	3 (Note: Appearances in the Copa de Oro)	0	21	8	25	8
Atlético Mineiro	1994	Série A	3	4	0	0	–		47	22	50	26
Atlético Mineiro	1995	Série A	0	0	0	0	–		14	10	14	10
Atlético Mineiro	Total		4	4	0	0	3	0	68	43	89	57
Anderlecht (loan)	1995–96	Jupiler Pro League	2	0	0	0	–		0	0	2	0
Palmeiras	1996	Série A	0	0	2 (Note: Appearances in the Copa do Brasil)	0	–		0	0	2	0
Hellas Verona	1996–97	Serie A	1	0	1 (Note: Appearances in the Coppa Italia)	0	–		0	0	2	0
Cruzeiro	1997	Série A	0	0	0	0	5 (Note: Appearances in the Copa Libertadores)	2	0	0	5	2
Botafogo	1997	Série A	1	1	0	0	–		0	0	1	1
Atlético Mineiro	1998	Série A	0	0	1	0	–		11	2	12	2
Bragantino	1998	Série A	2	1	0	0	–		0	0	2	1
Ponte Preta	1999	Série A	14	1	0	0	–		0	0	14	1
Atlético Paranaense	2000	Série A	3	0	0	0	–		0	0	3	0
Sociedade Esportiva do Gama	2001	Série A	18	3	0	0	–		0	0	18	3
Club Guaraní	2003	Paraguayan Primera División	–		–		1 (Note: Appearances in the Copa Sudamericana)	0	0	0	1	0
Career total			43	10	4	0	9	2	79	45	151	57
