= Ramires (footballer, born 1976) =

Portuguese footballer

Personal information
- Full name: Ricardo Miguel dos Santos Lopes Ramires
- Date of birth: 22 March 1976 (age 50)
- Place of birth: Lisbon, Portugal
- Height: 1.76 m (5 ft 9 in)
- Position: Midfielder

Youth career
- 1989–1994: Sporting

Senior career*
Years	Team	Apps	(Gls)
1994–1995	Torreense	16	(2)
1995–1996	Vitória Guimarães	2	(0)
1996–2000	Benfica	0	(0)
1996–2000	→ Alverca (loan)	105	(23)
2000–2004	Alverca	106	(11)
2004–2005	Santa Clara	16	(0)
2005–2006	Imortal	26	(6)
2006–2007	Zamora	28	(2)
2007–2011	RM Hamm Benfica	60	(15)
2011–2012	Union 05	10	(2)
Total		369	(61)

International career
1991	Portugal U-15	3	(1)
1991–1992	Portugal U16	12	(5)
1992	Portugal U17	3	(2)
1993–1994	Portugal U18	8	(0)
1995–1996	Portugal U20	10	(2)
1997	Portugal U21	3	(1)
2000	Portugal B	1	(1)
Medal record
Men's football
Representing Portugal
FIFA U-20 World Cup
Third place	1995 Qatar
- * Club domestic league appearances and goals

Ricardo Miguel dos Santos Lopes Ramires, known as Ramires (born 22 March 1976) is a Portuguese former professional footballer who played as a midfielder.

He played six seasons and 132 games in the Primeira Liga for Alverca and Vitória Guimarães.

== Club career ==
Ramires made his Primeira Liga debut for Vitória Guimarães on 30 September 1995 in a game against Salgueiros.

== Honours ==
Portugal U18

- UEFA European Under-18 Championship: 1994
