= Yevgeni Zezin =

Russian footballer

Personal information
- Full name: Yevgeni Kirillovich Zezin
- Date of birth: 14 April 1976 (age 50)
- Place of birth: Leningrad, Russian SFSR
- Height: 1.80 m (5 ft 11 in)
- Position: Midfielder

Youth career
- Volna St. Petersburg
- FC Zenit St. Petersburg

Senior career*
Years	Team	Apps	(Gls)
1992–1995	FC Zenit St. Petersburg	32	(2)
1995	FC Saturn-1991 St. Petersburg	17	(2)
1996	FC Zenit St. Petersburg	2	(0)
1996	FC Arsenal Tula	22	(0)
1997	FC Zenit St. Petersburg	3	(0)
1997–1999	FC Lokomotiv St. Petersburg	91	(15)
2000–2001	FC Arsenal Tula	44	(8)
2002	FC Kuban Krasnodar	23	(2)
2003	FC Metallurg Lipetsk	16	(0)
2005	SDYuShOR Zenit St. Petersburg		
2006–2007	FC Lukhovitsy	58	(8)
- * Club domestic league appearances and goals

Yevgeni Kirillovich Zezin (Russian: Евгений Кириллович Зезин; born 14 April 1976) is a former Russian professional football player.

== Club career ==
He was the youngest player to ever play in the Russian Premier League (he played his first game in 1992 when he was 16 years 114 days old) until Aleksei Rebko has beat his record in 2002.
