= Basile Essa Mvondo =

Cameroonian footballer

Essa Mvondo
Personal information
- Full name: Basile Essa Mvondo
- Date of birth: 19 April 1978 (age 48)
- Place of birth: Douala, Cameroon
- Height: 1.75 m (5 ft 9 in)
- Position: Defender

Senior career*
Years	Team	Apps	(Gls)
1995–1997	Aigle Royal Menoua		
1997–1998	Sint-Truiden		
1999–2000	Vevey Sports		
2000	Stade Beaucairois		
2001–2002	Valenciennes		
2002–2003	CO Châlons		
2004	Perak		
2005–2006	Woodlands Wellington	10	(4)
2006	Arema		
2007–2008	Persikota Tangerang		

International career
1995–1996	Cameroon	8	(0)
- * Club domestic league appearances and goals

Basile Essa Mvondo (born 19 April 1978) is a Cameroonian former professional footballer who played as an attacking midfielder.

He played in the Cameroon national team that won the 1995 African Youth Championship. He made eight appearances for Cameroon, and made the squad for the 1996 African Cup of Nations.

He played his club football with Aigle Royal Menoua in the 1995–96 season, and with Arema F.C. in Indonesia in the 2007–08 season, following which he retired from football.
