= Sergei Lysenko (footballer, born 1976) =

Russian footballer

Personal information
- Full name: Sergei Anatolyevich Lysenko
- Date of birth: 1 September 1976 (age 50)
- Height: 1.85 m (6 ft 1 in)
- Position: Defender

Senior career*
Years	Team	Apps	(Gls)
1992–1995	PFC CSKA-d Moscow	75	(2)
1996	FC Energiya-Tekstilshchik Kamyshin	25	(0)
1997	PFC CSKA-d Moscow	17	(0)
1997–1998	FC Chornomorets Odesa	2	(0)
- * Club domestic league appearances and goals

Sergei Anatolyevich Lysenko (Russian: Серге́й Анатольевич Лысенко; born 1 September 1976) is a former Russian professional football player.
