= 1995 FIFA World Youth Championship =

1995 بطولة العالم للشباب تحت 20 سنة

Tournament details
- Host country: Qatar
- Dates: 13–28 April
- Teams: 16 (from 6 confederations)
- Venues: 3 (in 1 host city)

Final positions
- Champions: Argentina (2nd title)
- Runners-up: Brazil
- Third place: Portugal
- Fourth place: Spain

Tournament statistics
- Matches played: 32
- Goals scored: 105 (3.28 per match)
- Attendance: 455,000 (14,219 per match)
- Top scorer: (Spain) Joseba Etxeberria (7 goals)
- Best player: (Brazil) Caio
- Fair play award: Japan

The 1995 FIFA World Youth Championship, known as the 1995 FIFA/Coca-Cola World Youth Championship for sponsorship purposes, was the 10th edition of the FIFA World Youth Championship. It was held in Qatar from 13 to 28 April 1995. The tournament took place in three venues within the city of Doha. The tournament was originally going to be held in Nigeria, but due to the meningitis outbreak, it withdrew from hosting duties. FIFA relocated the event to Qatar.

== Qualification ==
| Confederation | Qualifying Tournament | Qualifier(s) |
|---|---|---|
| AFC (Asia) | Host nation | Qatar |
| AFC (Asia) | 1994 AFC Youth Championship | Japan; Syria |
| CAF (Africa) | 1995 African Youth Championship | Burundi^{1} Cameroon |
| CONCACAF (North, Central America & Caribbean) | 1994 CONCACAF U-20 Tournament | Costa Rica; Honduras |
| CONMEBOL (South America) | 1995 South American Youth Championship | Argentina; Brazil; Chile |
| OFC (Oceania) | 1994 OFC U-20 Championship | Australia |
| UEFA (Europe) | 1994 UEFA European Under-18 Football Championship | Germany; Netherlands; Portugal; Russia; Spain |

1.Teams that made their debut.

== Squads ==
For a list of the squads see 1995 FIFA World Youth Championship squads.

== Group stage ==
=== Group A ===
| Pos | Team | Pld | W | D | L | GF | GA | GD | Pts | Group stage result |
|---|---|---|---|---|---|---|---|---|---|---|
| 1 | Brazil | 3 | 2 | 1 | 0 | 8 | 0 | +8 | 7 | Advance to knockout stage |
| 2 | Russia | 3 | 1 | 2 | 0 | 3 | 1 | +2 | 5 | Advance to knockout stage |
| 3 | Syria | 3 | 1 | 0 | 2 | 1 | 8 | −7 | 3 | |
| 4 | Qatar (H) | 3 | 0 | 1 | 2 | 1 | 4 | −3 | 1 | |

(H) Hosts
13 April 1995
20:15

| Qatar | 1–1 | Russia |
|---|---|---|
| Al Enazi 54' | (Report) | Semak 52' |

Khalifa Olympic Stadium, Doha
Attendance: 65,000
Referee: Hermann Albrecht (Germany)

14 April 1995
17:15

| Syria | 0–6 | Brazil |
|---|---|---|
| | (Report) | Reinaldo 12' (pen.), 25', 70'; Élder 67'; Caio 73'; Murilo 85' |

Khalifa Olympic Stadium, Doha
Attendance: 40,000
Referee: Alain Sars (France)

16 April 1995
17:15

| Qatar | 0–1 | Syria |
|---|---|---|
| | (Report) | Al Boushi 52' |

Khalifa Olympic Stadium, Doha
Attendance: 60,000
Referee: Dermot Gallagher (England)

17 April 1995
17:15

| Russia | 0–0 | Brazil |
|---|---|---|
| | (Report) |

Khalifa Olympic Stadium, Doha
Attendance: 5,000
Referee: Gamal Ghandour (Egypt)

19 April 1995
17:15

| Qatar | 0–2 | Brazil |
|---|---|---|
| | (Report) | Caio 50'; Élder 61' |

Khalifa Olympic Stadium, Doha
Attendance: 40,000
Referee: Ramón Luis Méndez Vega (Costa Rica)

19 April 1995
17:15

| Russia | 2–0 | Syria |
|---|---|---|
| Chumachenko 2'; Lysenko 90' | (Report) |

Al-Ahly Stadium, Doha
Attendance: 3,000
Referee: Javier Castrilli (Argentina)

=== Group B ===
| Pos | Team | Pld | W | D | L | GF | GA | GD | Pts | Group stage result |
|---|---|---|---|---|---|---|---|---|---|---|
| 1 | Spain | 3 | 3 | 0 | 0 | 13 | 5 | +8 | 9 | Advance to knockout stage |
| 2 | Japan | 3 | 1 | 1 | 1 | 5 | 4 | +1 | 4 | Advance to knockout stage |
| 3 | Chile | 3 | 0 | 2 | 1 | 6 | 9 | −3 | 2 | |
| 4 | Burundi | 3 | 0 | 1 | 2 | 2 | 8 | −6 | 1 | |

13 April 1995
17:15

| Burundi | 1–5 | Spain |
|---|---|---|
| Ndayishimite 82' | (Report) | Martínez 26'; Raúl 36'; Roger 40' (pen.); Etxeberria 72', 86' |

Al-Ahly Stadium, Doha
Attendance: 1,000
Referee: Marcio Rezende (Brazil)

14 April 1995
17:15

| Chile | 2–2 | Japan |
|---|---|---|
| Rozental 11' (pen.), 67' | (Report) | Oki 47'; Nakata 87' |

Al-Ahly Stadium, Doha
Attendance: 2,000
Referee: Charles Masembe (Uganda)

16 April 1995
17:15

| Burundi | 1–1 | Chile |
|---|---|---|
| Butunungu 83' | (Report) | Rozental 14' |

Al-Ahly Stadium, Doha
Attendance: 3,000
Referee: Ramón Luis Méndez Vega (Costa Rica)

17 April 1995
17:15

| Spain | 2–1 | Japan |
|---|---|---|
| Roger 8'; Raúl 83' | (Report) | Nakata 69' |

Al-Ahly Stadium, Doha
Attendance: 4,000
Referee: Zeli Sinko (Côte d'Ivoire)

19 April 1995
19:45

| Burundi | 0–2 | Japan |
|---|---|---|
| | (Report) | Yasunaga 10'; Yamada 17' (pen.) |

Khalifa Olympic Stadium, Doha
Attendance: 4,000
Referee: Gamal Ghandour (Egypt)

19 April 1995
19:45

| Spain | 6–3 | Chile |
|---|---|---|
| Etxeberria 9', 13'; Ochoa 20', 61'; Salgado 47'; De la Peña 80' (pen.) | (Report) | Rozental 52'; Poli 77'; Lobos 83' |

Al-Ahly Stadium, Doha
Attendance: 3,000
Referee: Pascual Rebolledo Cárdenas (Mexico)

=== Group C ===
| Pos | Team | Pld | W | D | L | GF | GA | GD | Pts | Group stage result |
|---|---|---|---|---|---|---|---|---|---|---|
| 1 | Portugal | 3 | 3 | 0 | 0 | 7 | 2 | +5 | 9 | Advance to knockout stage |
| 2 | Argentina | 3 | 2 | 0 | 1 | 5 | 3 | +2 | 6 | Advance to knockout stage |
| 3 | Netherlands | 3 | 1 | 0 | 2 | 7 | 5 | +2 | 3 | |
| 4 | Honduras | 3 | 0 | 0 | 3 | 5 | 14 | −9 | 0 | |

13 April 1995
17:15

| Netherlands | 0–1 | Argentina |
|---|---|---|
| | (Report) | Garrone 90' |

Qatar SC Stadium, Doha
Attendance: 2,000
Referee: Pascual Rebolledo Cárdenas (Mexico)

14 April 1995
19:45

| Honduras | 2–3 | Portugal |
|---|---|---|
| Guevara 26'; Cabrera 34' | (Report) | Nuno Gomes 18', 66'; Dani 53' |

Khalifa Olympic Stadium, Doha
Attendance: 10,000
Referee: Emmanuel Dada Obafemi (Nigeria)

16 April 1995
19:45

| Netherlands | 7–1 | Honduras |
|---|---|---|
| Wooter 3', 44'; Witzenhausen 10', 24', 77'; Gehring 67'; Bouma 78' | (Report) | Oseguera 48' (pen.) |

Khalifa Olympic Stadium, Doha
Attendance: 20,000
Referee: Masayoshi Okada (Japan)

17 April 1995
19:45

| Argentina | 0–1 | Portugal |
|---|---|---|
| | (Report) | Dani 71' |

Khalifa Olympic Stadium, Doha
Attendance: 8,000
Referee: Rune Pedersen (Norway)

20 April 1995
17:15

| Netherlands | 0–3 | Portugal |
|---|---|---|
| | (Report) | Beto 9' (pen.); Dani 47'; Agostinho 70' |

Khalifa Olympic Stadium, Doha
Attendance: 4,000
Referee: Hermann Albrecht (Germany)

20 April 1995
17:15

| Argentina | 4–2 | Honduras |
|---|---|---|
| Ibagaza 6'; Pena 3', 42', 72' | (Report) | Guevara 48'; Medina 60' |

Al-Ahly Stadium, Doha
Attendance: 3,000
Referee: Nikolai Levnikov (Russia)

=== Group D ===
| Pos | Team | Pld | W | D | L | GF | GA | GD | Pts | Group stage result |
|---|---|---|---|---|---|---|---|---|---|---|
| 1 | Cameroon | 3 | 2 | 1 | 0 | 7 | 4 | +3 | 7 | Advance to knockout stage |
| 2 | Australia | 3 | 1 | 1 | 1 | 5 | 4 | +1 | 4 | Advance to knockout stage |
| 3 | Costa Rica | 3 | 1 | 0 | 2 | 3 | 6 | −3 | 3 | |
| 4 | Germany | 3 | 0 | 2 | 1 | 3 | 4 | −1 | 2 | |

13 April 1995
19:45

| Australia | 2–0 | Costa Rica |
|---|---|---|
| Viduka 51'; Enes 74' (pen.) | (Report) |

Al-Ahly Stadium, Doha
Attendance: 1,000
Referee: Abdul Rahman Al-Zeid (Saudi Arabia)

14 April 1995
19:45

| Cameroon | 1–1 | Germany |
|---|---|---|
| Simo 90' | (Report) | Hinz 9' (pen.) |

Al-Ahly Stadium, Doha
Attendance: 1,000
Referee: Javier Castrilli (Argentina)

16 April 1995
19:45

| Australia | 2–3 | Cameroon |
|---|---|---|
| Viduka 11', 72' | (Report) | Ntamag 52', 90'; Ndiefi 67' |

Al-Ahly Stadium, Doha
Attendance: 5,000
Referee: Nikolai Levnikov (Russia)

17 April 1995
19:45

| Costa Rica | 2–1 | Germany |
|---|---|---|
| Bennette 42' (pen.); Soto 52' | (Report) | Walle 90' |

Al-Ahly Stadium, Doha
Attendance: 5,000
Referee: Alain Sars (France)

20 April 1995
19:45

| Australia | 1–1 | Germany |
|---|---|---|
| Viduka 54' | (Report) | Rath 23' |

Khalifa Olympic Stadium, Doha
Attendance: 4,000
Referee: Marcio Rezende (Brazil)

20 April 1995
19:45

| Costa Rica | 1–3 | Cameroon |
|---|---|---|
| Bennette 30' | (Report) | Ndiefi 26'; Essa 36', 75' |

Al-Ahly Stadium, Doha
Attendance: 6,000
Referee: Dermot Gallagher (England)

== Knockout stages ==
Quarter-finals
April 23 - Doha (KOS)
Brazil | 2
Japan | 1
April 23 - Doha (KOS)
Portugal (a.e.t.) | 2
Australia | 1
April 23 - Doha (AAS)
Spain | 4
Russia | 1
April 23 - Doha (AAS)
Cameroon | 0
Argentina | 2

Semi-finals
April 25 - Doha (KOS)
Brazil | 1
Portugal | 0
April 25 - Doha (KOS)
Spain | 0
Argentina | 3

Final
April 28 - Doha (KOS)
Brazil | 0
Argentina | 2
Third place
April 28 - Doha (KOS)
Portugal | 3
Spain | 2

=== Quarter-finals ===
23 April 1995
17:15

| Brazil | 2–1 | Japan |
|---|---|---|
| Caio 26', 40' | (Report) | Oku 15' |

Khalifa Olympic Stadium, Doha
Attendance: 5,000
Referee: Hermann Albrecht (Germany)

23 April 1995
17:15

| Spain | 4–1 | Russia |
|---|---|---|
| Raúl 3'; Etxeberria 13', 21', 62' | (Report) | Lipko 65' (pen.) |

Al-Ahly Stadium, Doha
Attendance: 4,000
Referee: Gamal Ghandour (Egypt)

23 April 1995
20:15

| Portugal | 2–1 (a.e.t.) | Australia |
|---|---|---|
| Agostinho 66', 100' | (Report) | Carlos Felipe 72' (o.g.) |

Khalifa Olympic Stadium, Doha
Attendance: 5,000
Referee: Rune Pedersen (Norway)

23 April 1995
20:15

| Cameroon | 0–2 | Argentina |
|---|---|---|
| | (Report) | Guerrero 37'; Coyette 49' |

Al-Ahly Stadium, Doha
Attendance: 7,000
Referee: Alain Sars (France)

=== Semi-finals ===
25 April 1995
17:15

| Brazil | 1–0 | Portugal |
|---|---|---|
| Caio 90' | (Report) |

Khalifa Olympic Stadium, Doha
Attendance: 10,000
Referee: Pascual Rebolledo Cárdenas (Mexico)

25 April 1995
20:15

| Spain | 0–3 | Argentina |
|---|---|---|
| | (Report) | Biagini 21'; Coyette 54'; Chaparro 81' |

Khalifa Olympic Stadium, Doha
Attendance: 10,000
Referee: Hermann Albrecht (Germany)

=== Third place play-off ===
28 April 1995
14:45

| Portugal | 3–2 | Spain |
|---|---|---|
| Nuno Gomes 68', 82'; Dani 73' | (Report) | Salgado 25'; De la Peña 38' |

Khalifa Olympic Stadium, Doha
Attendance: 50,000
Referee: Abdul Rahman Al-Zeid (Saudi Arabia)

=== Final ===
28 April 1995
17:15

| Brazil | 0–2 | Argentina |
|---|---|---|
| | (Report) | Biagini 25'; Guerrero 89' |

Khalifa Olympic Stadium, Doha
Attendance: 65,000
Referee: Dermot Gallagher (England)

Team details

Brazil
Argentina

| GK | 1 | Fábio Noronha |
| DF | 2 | Dedimar | Booked |
| DF | 3 | Fabiano | Booked |
| DF | 13 | César Belli | Booked |
| DF | 6 | Léo Inácio |
| MF | 5 | Zé Elias | Booked |
| MF | 8 | Élder | Booked | Substituted off |
| MF | 11 | Gláucio |
| MF | 16 | Murilo | | Substituted off |
| FW | 7 | Reinaldo | | Substituted off |
| FW | 9 | Caio | Booked |
Substitutes:
| MF | 10 | Claudinho | | (substituted on) a' |
| MF | 18 | Denílson | | (substituted on) b' |
| FW | 17 | Luizao | | (substituted on) b' |
Manager:
(Brazil) Júlio César Leal

| GK | 1 | Joaquín Irigoytía | | (substituted off) a' |
| DF | 4 | Gustavo Lombardi |
| DF | 2 | Sebastián Pena | Booked |
| DF | 6 | Juan Pablo Sorín |
| DF | 3 | Federico Domínguez |
| MF | 8 | Guillermo Larrosa | Booked |
| MF | 5 | Mariano Juan |
| MF | 10 | Ariel Ibagaza | Booked |
| FW | 17 | Walter Coyette |
| FW | 11 | Leonardo Biagini | | (substituted off) a' |
| FW | 18 | Cristián Chaparro | Booked |
Substitutes:
| GK | 12 | Gastón Pezzuti | | (substituted on) a' |
| FW | 7 | Francisco Guerrero | | Substituted on |
| FW | 9 | Carlos Arangio | | Substituted on |
Manager:
(Argentina) José Pekerman

== Result ==
FIFA World Youth Championship 1995 winners

Argentina
2nd title

== Awards ==
| Golden Shoe | Golden Ball | FIFA Fair Play Award |
|---|---|---|
| (Spain) Joseba Etxeberria | (Brazil) Caio | Japan |

== Goalscorers ==
Joseba Etxeberria of Spain won the Golden Boot award for scoring seven goals. In total, 105 goals were scored by 58 different players, with only one of them credited as own goal.

7 goals

- (Spain) Joseba Etxeberria

5 goals

- (Brazil) Caio

4 goals

- (Australia) Mark Viduka
- (Chile) Sebastián Rozental
- (Portugal) Dani
- (Portugal) Nuno Gomes

3 goals

- (Argentina) Sebastián Pena
- (Brazil) Reinaldo
- (Netherlands) Mendel Witzenhausen
- (Portugal) Agostinho
- (Spain) Raúl

2 goals

- (Argentina) Francisco Gabriel Guerrero
- (Argentina) Leonardo Biagini
- (Argentina) Walter Coyette
- (Brazil) Élder
- (Cameroon) Basile Essa
- (Cameroon) Macdonald Ndiefi
- (Cameroon) Valery Ntamag
- (Costa Rica) Jewison Bennette
- (Honduras) Amado Guevara
- (Japan) Hidetoshi Nakata
- (Netherlands) Nordin Wooter
- (Spain) Iván de la Peña
- (Spain) Míchel Salgado
- (Spain) Raúl Ochoa
- (Spain) Roger

1 goal

- (Argentina) Andrés Garrone
- (Argentina) Ariel Ibagaza
- (Argentina) Raúl Chaparro
- (Australia) Robert Enes
- (Brazil) Murilo
- (Burundi) Blaise Butunungu
- (Burundi) Fredy Ndayishimite
- (Cameroon) Augustine Simo
- (Chile) Dante Poli
- (Chile) Frank Lobos
- (Costa Rica) Jafet Soto
- (Germany) Carsten Hinz
- (Germany) Jan Walle
- (Germany) Marcel Rath
- (Honduras) Edwin Medina
- (Honduras) Luis Oseguera
- (Honduras) Orvin Cabrera
- (Japan) Daisuke Oku
- (Japan) Nobuhisa Yamada
- (Japan) Sotaro Yasunaga
- (Japan) Susumu Oki
- (Netherlands) Rob Gehring
- (Netherlands) Wilfred Bouma
- (Portugal) Beto
- (Qatar) Mohammed Salem Al-Enazi
- (Russia) Aleksandr Lipko
- (Russia) Sergei Lysenko
- (Russia) Sergei Semak
- (Russia) Yevgeni Chumachenko
- (Spain) Luis Martínez
- (Syria) Nihad Al Boushi

Own goal

- (Portugal) Carlos Felipe (playing against Australia)

== Final ranking ==
| Pos | Team | Pld | W | D | L | GF | GA | GD | Pts | Final result |
|---|---|---|---|---|---|---|---|---|---|---|
| 1 | Argentina | 6 | 5 | 0 | 1 | 12 | 3 | +9 | 15 | Champions |
| 2 | Brazil | 6 | 4 | 1 | 1 | 11 | 3 | +8 | 13 | Runners-up |
| 3 | Portugal | 6 | 5 | 0 | 1 | 12 | 6 | +6 | 15 | Third place |
| 4 | Spain | 6 | 4 | 0 | 2 | 19 | 12 | +7 | 12 | Fourth place |
| 5 | Cameroon | 4 | 2 | 1 | 1 | 7 | 6 | +1 | 7 | Eliminated in Quarter-finals |
| 6 | Russia | 4 | 1 | 2 | 1 | 4 | 5 | −1 | 5 | Eliminated in Quarter-finals |
| 7 | Australia | 4 | 1 | 1 | 2 | 6 | 6 | 0 | 4 | Eliminated in Quarter-finals |
| 7 | Japan | 4 | 1 | 1 | 2 | 6 | 6 | 0 | 4 | Eliminated in Quarter-finals |
| 9 | Netherlands | 3 | 1 | 0 | 2 | 7 | 5 | +2 | 3 | Eliminated in Group stage |
| 10 | Costa Rica | 3 | 1 | 0 | 2 | 3 | 6 | −3 | 3 | Eliminated in Group stage |
| 11 | Syria | 3 | 1 | 0 | 2 | 1 | 8 | −7 | 3 | Eliminated in Group stage |
| 12 | Germany | 3 | 0 | 2 | 1 | 3 | 4 | −1 | 2 | Eliminated in Group stage |
| 13 | Chile | 3 | 0 | 2 | 1 | 6 | 9 | −3 | 2 | Eliminated in Group stage |
| 14 | Qatar (H) | 3 | 0 | 1 | 2 | 1 | 4 | −3 | 1 | Eliminated in Group stage |
| 15 | Burundi | 3 | 0 | 1 | 2 | 2 | 8 | −6 | 1 | Eliminated in Group stage |
| 16 | Honduras | 3 | 0 | 0 | 3 | 5 | 14 | −9 | 0 | Eliminated in Group stage |

Source: rsssf.com
(H) Hosts
