= Marcel Rath =

German footballer

Personal information
- Date of birth: 3 September 1975 (age 51)
- Place of birth: Frankfurt (Oder), East Germany
- Height: 1.80 m (5 ft 11 in)
- Position: Striker

Youth career
- Vorwärts Frankfurt/Oder
- Chemie PCK Schwedt

Senior career*
Years	Team	Apps	(Gls)
1993–1995	FC Stahl Eisenhüttenstadt	53	(19)
1995–1997	Hertha BSC	28	(4)
1997–2000	Energie Cottbus	58	(8)
2000–2002	FC St. Pauli	58	(19)
2002–2004	LR Ahlen	38	(6)
2005	Union Berlin	14	(2)
2005–2006	Waldhof Mannheim	27	(7)
2006–2007	Digenis Akritas Morphou	13	(2)
Total		289	(67)

International career
1995	Germany U20	2	(1)
1996	Germany U21	1	(0)
- * Club domestic league appearances and goals

Marcel Rath (born 3 September 1975) is a German former professional footballer who played as a striker.
