= Yevgeni Chumachenko =

Russian footballer, official, and director

Personal information
- Full name: Yevgeni Viktorovich Chumachenko
- Date of birth: 18 December 1975 (age 50)
- Place of birth: Volzhsky, Russian SFSR
- Height: 1.85 m (6 ft 1 in)
- Position: Defender

Team information
- Current team: FC Energiya Volzhsky (director)

Senior career*
Years	Team	Apps	(Gls)
1992–1994	FC Torpedo Volzhsky	51	(1)
1995	FC Rotor Volgograd	12	(0)
1996	FC Torpedo Volzhsky	32	(2)
1997–1998	FC Lada-Grad Dimitrovgrad	44	(6)
1998	FC Lada-Togliatti-VAZ Togliatti	17	(0)
1999–2004	FC Metallurg Lipetsk	199	(19)
2005	FC Metallurg-Kuzbass Novokuznetsk	16	(0)
2005–2008	FC Rotor Volgograd	75	(5)
2009	FC Volgograd	0	(0)

Managerial career
- 2013–: FC Energiya Volzhsky (director)
- * Club domestic league appearances and goals

Yevgeni Viktorovich Chumachenko (Russian: Евгений Викторович Чумаченко; born 18 December 1975) is a Russian professional football official and a former player. He is the director with FC Energiya Volzhsky.

== Club career ==
He made his debut in the Russian Premier League in 1995 for FC Rotor Volgograd.
