= Carlos Filipe =

Portuguese footballer

Personal information
- Full name: Carlos Filipe Carvalho Ferreira Silva
- Date of birth: 15 September 1975 (age 51)
- Place of birth: Porto, Portugal
- Position: Midfielder

Youth career
- 1985–1994: Porto

Senior career*
Years	Team	Apps	(Gls)
1994	Porto	1	(0)
1994–1996	U. Lamas	40	(1)
1996–1997	Gil Vicente	16	(0)
1997–1998	Cádiz	9	(0)
1998–1999	Naval	27	(0)
1999–2000	União Madeira	9	(0)
2000–2001	Tirsense		
2001–2003	Lixa		
2003–2004	Ermesinde	29	(0)
2004–2007	Coimbrões		

International career
1991	Portugal U-15	3	(0)
1991–1992	Portugal U-16	12	(1)
1993	Portugal U-17	3	(1)
1993–1994	Portugal U-18	11	(0)
1995	Portugal U-20	9	(1)
1996	Portugal U-21	2	(0)
Medal record
Men's football
Representing Portugal
FIFA U-20 World Cup
Third place	1995 Qatar
- * Club domestic league appearances and goals

Carlos Filipe Carvalho Ferreira Silva, known as Carlos Filipe (born 15 September 1975) is a former Portuguese football player.

== Club career ==
He made his Primeira Liga debut for Porto on 2 June 1994 in a game against Beira-Mar.

== Honours ==
Portugal Under-18

- UEFA European Under-18 Championship: 1994
