= Til Bettenstaedt =

German footballer

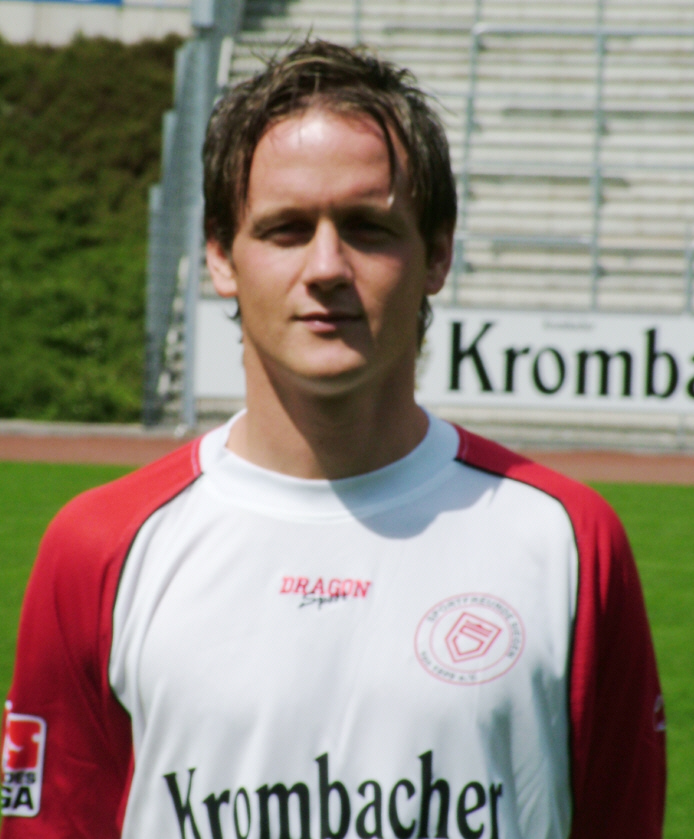

Personal information
- Date of birth: 20 January 1976 (age 50)
- Place of birth: Marburg, West Germany
- Height: 1.82 m (6 ft 0 in)
- Position: Forward

Team information
- Current team: BV Cloppenburg II (manager)

Youth career
- –1992: VfL Marburg

Senior career*
Years	Team	Apps	(Gls)
1992–1995	Schalke 04	1	(0)
1995–1997	SpVgg Erkenschwick		
1997–1999	SC Verl		
1999–2007	Sportfreunde Siegen	204	(62)
2007–2008	BV Cloppenburg		
2008–2011	BV Cloppenburg II		

Managerial career
- 2008–2011: BV Cloppenburg II (player-coach)
- 2011–: BV Cloppenburg II
- * Club domestic league appearances and goals

Til Bettenstaedt (born 20 January 1976) is a former German footballer and currently the manager of BV Cloppenburg II.

Since the 1999–2000 season on he played for 2. Bundesliga team Sportfreunde Siegen, promoted in 2004–05 from the Regionalliga. Previously, he played for the amateur teams of FC Schalke 04, for whom he once appeared within the first team, and SC Verl, where he was situated between 1995 and 1999.

In the crucial promotion season he hit ten goals in 31 appearances.

Bettenstaedt joined BV Cloppenburg in July 2007 after spending eight years at Siegen. In July 2008 he was registered to the second team of Cloppenburg.
