= Andrés Garrone =

Argentine footballer (born 1976)

Personal information
- Full name: Andrés Miguel Garrone
- Date of birth: 13 May 1976 (age 50)
- Place of birth: Leones, Córdoba, Argentina
- Position: Forward

Senior career*
Years	Team	Apps	(Gls)
	Rosario Central	16+	(2+)
1997–1998	CA Los Andes	17	(0)
1998–1999	Central Córdoba de Rosario	2	(0)
1999–2000	Club El Porvenir	8	(0)
2000	Deportes Quindío		
2001	F.C. Maia		
2001–2003	F.C. Matera		
2003–2004	S.S.D. Sapri Calcio		
2004–2005	Cosenza Calcio		
2005–2007	A.C. Rodengo Saiano		
2007–2009	U.S. Darfo Boario S.S.D.		
2009–2010	Orsa Corte Franca		
2010–2011	Aurora Seriate Calcio		
2011–2012	Orsa Corte Franca		
- * Club domestic league appearances and goals

Andrés Miguel Garrone (born 13 May 1976) is an Argentine retired footballer.
