= Raúl Chaparro =

Argentine footballer

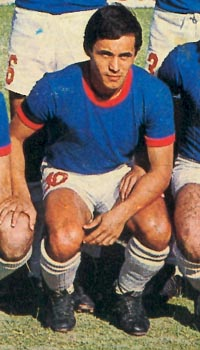

Personal information
- Full name: Raul de la Cruz Chaparro
- Date of birth: 3 May 1953 (age 73)
- Place of birth: Formosa, Argentina
- Position: Midfielder

Senior career*
Years	Team	Apps	(Gls)
1971–1974	San Lorenzo de Almagro		
1973	→ Gimnasia y Esgrima de Jujuy (loan)		
1975–1977	Tigre		
1977–1978	Chacarita Juniors		
1978–1979	San Martín de Tucumán		
1980–1982	Instituto		
1982–1983	River Plate		
1983–1985	Rosario Central		
1985–1986	Tigre		
1986–1988	Racing de Córdoba		
1988–1989	Colón		
1989–1990	Defensores de Belgrano		

International career
1982	Argentina	1	(0)
- * Club domestic league appearances and goals

Raúl de la Cruz Chaparro (born 3 May 1953) is an Argentine former footballer who played at both professional and international levels as a midfielder. In 2012, he became manager of Sarmiento de Resistencia.

== Career ==
Chaparro played club football for San Lorenzo de Almagro, Gimnasia y Esgrima de Jujuy, Tigre, Chacarita Juniors, San Martín de Tucumán, Instituto, River Plate, Rosario Central, Racing de Córdoba, Colón and Defensores de Belgrano.

He also earned one cap for Argentina in 1982.
