= 1993 FIFA U-17 World Championship squads =

This is a list of the squads selected for the 1993 FIFA U-17 World Championship.

== Group A ==
=== Japan ===
Head coach: (Japan) Tadatoshi Komine

| No. | Pos. | Player | Date of birth (age) | Caps | Club |
|---|---|---|---|---|---|
| 1 | GK | Takuya Ito | 30 December 1976 (aged 16) | | (Japan) Yokohama F. Marinos |
| 2 | DF | Michiyasu Osada | 5 March 1978 (aged 15) | | (Japan) Verdy Kawasaki |
| 3 | DF | Naoki Matsuda | 14 March 1977 (aged 16) | | (Japan) Maebashi Ikuei High School |
| 4 | DF | Kazuhiro Suzuki | 16 November 1976 (aged 16) | | (Japan) Ichiritsu Funabashi High School |
| 5 | DF | Tsuneyasu Miyamoto | 7 February 1977 (aged 16) | | (Japan) Gamba Osaka |
| 6 | DF | Jun Hashimoto | 19 October 1976 (aged 16) | | (Japan) Tohoku Gakuin High School |
| 7 | FW | Takayuki Yoshida | 14 March 1977 (aged 16) | | (Japan) Takigawa Daini High School |
| 8 | MF | Taro Ichiki | 1 September 1976 (aged 16) | | (Japan) Verdy Kawasaki |
| 9 | FW | Hiroshi Sakai | 19 October 1976 (aged 16) | | (Japan) Yokkaichi Chuo Kogyo High School |
| 10 | MF | Nobuyuki Zaizen | 19 October 1976 (aged 16) | | (Japan) Verdy Kawasaki |
| 11 | FW | Hidetoshi Nakata (captain) | 22 January 1977 (aged 16) | | (Japan) Nirasaki High School |
| 12 | GK | Kiyomitsu Kobari | 12 June 1977 (aged 16) | | (Japan) Verdy Kawasaki |
| 13 | MF | Makoto Ishimoto | 11 January 1977 (aged 16) | | (Japan) Numata High School |
| 14 | FW | Yuzo Funakoshi | 12 June 1977 (aged 16) | | (Japan) Kunimi High School |
| 15 | MF | Naoya Saeki | 18 December 1977 (aged 15) | | (Japan) Verdy Kawasaki |
| 16 | FW | Satoshi Fujita | 23 September 1976 (aged 16) | | (Japan) Tokushima Ichiritsu High School |
| 17 | MF | Kazuyuki Toda | 30 December 1977 (aged 15) | | (Japan) Toin Gakuen High School |
| 18 | FW | Takuya Kajikawa | 14 December 1976 (aged 16) | | (Japan) Takatsuki Minami High School |

=== Ghana ===
Head coach: (Ghana) Isaac Paha

| No. | Pos. | Player | Date of birth (age) | Caps | Club |
|---|---|---|---|---|---|
| 1 | GK | Ali Jarrah | 4 October 1976 (aged 16) | | (Ghana) Hearts of Oak |
| 2 | DF | Robert Oduro | 27 June 1977 (aged 16) | | (Ghana) Cornerstones |
| 3 | DF | Sebastian Barnes | 18 November 1976 (aged 16) | | (Germany) Bayer Leverkusen |
| 4 | DF | Samuel Kuffour | 3 September 1976 (aged 16) | | (Italy) Torino |
| 5 | DF | Emmanuel Opoku | 14 November 1976 (aged 16) | | (Ghana) Afienya |
| 6 | DF | Mark Edusei | 29 September 1976 (aged 16) | | (Ghana) King Faisal |
| 7 | FW | Joseph Fameye | 19 October 1978 (aged 14) | | (Ghana) Afienya |
| 8 | MF | Daniel Addo | 6 November 1976 (aged 16) | | (Germany) Bayer Leverkusen |
| 9 | FW | Essuman Dadzie | 5 August 1976 (aged 17) | | (Ghana) Dawu United |
| 10 | FW | Seth Twumasi | 10 December 1976 (aged 16) | | (Ghana) King Faisal |
| 11 | FW | Emmanuel Duah | 14 November 1976 (aged 16) | | (Italy) Torino |
| 12 | MF | Nii Welbeck | 3 October 1976 (aged 16) | | (Ghana) Okwawu United |
| 13 | MF | Daniel Armah | 30 August 1976 (aged 16) | | (Ghana) Ghapoha |
| 14 | DF | Gabriel Antwi | 13 October 1978 (aged 14) | | (Ghana) Neoplan Stars |
| 15 | DF | Mohammed Muftawu | 17 November 1978 (aged 14) | | (Ghana) Liberty Professionals |
| 16 | GK | James Nanor | 12 August 1976 (aged 17) | | (Ghana) Afienya |
| 17 | FW | Kenneth Sarpong | 7 August 1978 (aged 15) | | (Ghana) Cornerstones |
| 18 | GK | Samuel Addo | 20 October 1976 (aged 16) | | (Ghana) Great Olympics |

=== Italy ===
Head coach: (Italy) Sergio Vatta

| No. | Pos. | Player | Date of birth (age) | Caps | Club |
|---|---|---|---|---|---|
| 1 | GK | Gianluigi Buffon | 28 January 1978 (aged 15) | | (Italy) Parma |
| 2 | DF | Francesco Coco | 8 January 1978 (aged 15) | | (Italy) Milan |
| 3 | DF | David Giubilato | 13 September 1976 (aged 16) | | (Italy) Torino |
| 4 | DF | Antonio Calabro | 10 August 1976 (aged 17) | | (Italy) Lazio |
| 5 | DF | Enrico Morello | 11 January 1977 (aged 16) | | (Italy) Parma |
| 6 | DF | Fabrizio Stringardi | 16 September 1976 (aged 16) | | (Italy) Torino |
| 7 | FW | Carmelo Augliera | 2 February 1977 (aged 16) | | (Italy) Milan |
| 8 | MF | Nicola Ferrarini | 9 January 1977 (aged 16) | | (Italy) Parma |
| 9 | FW | Francesco De Francesco | 21 September 1977 (aged 15) | | (Italy) Milan |
| 10 | MF | Dario Dossi | 2 February 1977 (aged 16) | | (Italy) Brescia |
| 11 | FW | Francesco Totti C | 27 September 1976 (aged 16) | | (Italy) Roma |
| 12 | GK | Marco Casagrande | 17 August 1976 (aged 17) | | (Italy) Brescia |
| 13 | DF | Luca Gallipoli | 8 August 1976 (aged 17) | | (Italy) Torino |
| 14 | MF | Vincenzo Caccavale | 9 August 1976 (aged 17) | | (Italy) Torino |
| 15 | MF | Luca Vigiani | 25 August 1976 (aged 16) | | (Italy) Fiorentina |
| 16 | DF | Davide Venturelli | 25 November 1976 (aged 16) | | (Italy) Torino |
| 17 | MF | Alberto Bernardi | 15 June 1977 (aged 16) | | (Italy) Torino |
| 18 | MF | Andrea Ferlino | 1 October 1977 (aged 15) | | (Italy) Internazionale |

=== Mexico ===
Head coach: (Mexico) Juan Manuel Álvarez

| No. | Pos. | Player | Date of birth (age) | Caps | Club |
|---|---|---|---|---|---|
| 1 | GK | Hugo Olmedo | 26 October 1976 (aged 16) | | (Mexico) América |
| 2 | DF | Jorge Betancourt | 9 August 1976 (aged 17) | | (Mexico) América |
| 3 | DF | Carlos García | 24 December 1976 (aged 16) | | (Mexico) UNAM |
| 4 | DF | Raúl Chabrand | 11 October 1976 (aged 16) | | (Mexico) Monterrey |
| 5 | DF | Miguel Carreón | 6 September 1976 (aged 16) | | (Mexico) UNAM |
| 6 | DF | Manuel Reyes | 22 August 1976 (aged 16) | | (Mexico) Cruz Azul |
| 7 | MF | José Martínez | 20 August 1976 (aged 17) | | (Mexico) Cruz Azul |
| 8 | MF | Hugo Chávez | 16 October 1976 (aged 16) | | (Mexico) Veracruz |
| 9 | MF | Arturo Tagle | 11 August 1977 (aged 16) | | (Mexico) América |
| 10 | MF | Edgar Santa Cruz | 13 January 1977 (aged 16) | | (Mexico) América |
| 11 | FW | Samuel Torres | 7 October 1976 (aged 16) | | (Mexico) Necaxa |
| 12 | GK | Alfredo Toxqui | 24 December 1976 (aged 16) | | (Mexico) Guadalajara |
| 13 | FW | Edgar García | 1 September 1977 (aged 15) | | (Mexico) UNAM |
| 14 | FW | José Prieto | 10 April 1977 (aged 16) | | (Mexico) Atlas |
| 15 | MF | Carlos Cortés | 15 February 1977 (aged 16) | | (Mexico) Guadalajara |
| 16 | FW | Enrique López | 12 October 1976 (aged 16) | | (Mexico) Santos Laguna |
| 17 | MF | Arturo Lomelí | 26 October 1976 (aged 16) | | (Mexico) Guadalajara |
| 18 | MF | Arturo Ortega | 30 August 1976 (aged 16) | | (Mexico) UNAM |

== Group B ==
=== Australia ===
Head coach: (Germany) Les Scheinflug

| No. | Pos. | Player | Date of birth (age) | Caps | Club |
|---|---|---|---|---|---|
| 1 | GK | Paul Lapić | 23 October 1976 (aged 16) | | (Australia) Adelaide Croatia |
| 2 | DF | Andrew McDermott | 24 March 1977 (aged 16) | | (Australia) St. George |
| 3 | DF | Darren Sime | 12 January 1977 (aged 16) | | (Australia) Australian Institute of Sport |
| 4 | DF | Dragi Nastevski | 26 January 1977 (aged 16) | | (Australia) Victorian Institute of Sport |
| 5 | DF | David Ristevski | 24 November 1976 (aged 16) | | (Australia) Australian Institute of Sport |
| 6 | MF | Paul Bilokapic | 8 August 1976 (aged 17) | | (Australia) Sydney Croatia |
| 7 | MF | Roberto Gómez | 14 September 1976 (aged 16) | | (Australia) Marconi Stallions |
| 8 | MF | Andy Vargas | 3 July 1977 (aged 16) | | (Australia) Victorian Institute of Sport |
| 9 | FW | Sebastian Naglieri | 31 October 1976 (aged 16) | | (Australia) Australian Institute of Sport |
| 10 | FW | Jonathon Carter | 12 August 1976 (aged 17) | | (Australia) Australian Institute of Sport |
| 11 | MF | Giovanni Carbone | 30 July 1977 (aged 16) | | (Australia) Perth Italia |
| 12 | DF | Malcolm Mielak | 25 September 1976 (aged 16) | | (Australia) Parramatta Eagles |
| 13 | DF | Hayden Foxe C | 23 June 1977 (aged 16) | | (Australia) Blacktown City |
| 14 | MF | Nick Bosevski | 2 December 1976 (aged 16) | | (Australia) Marconi Stallions |
| 15 | MF | Milan Gajić | 3 November 1976 (aged 16) | | (Australia) Parramatta Eagles |
| 16 | MF | Anthony Alvos | 11 November 1976 (aged 16) | | (Australia) Lismore Workers |
| 17 | FW | Joseph Tricarico | 24 November 1976 (aged 16) | | (Australia) Victorian Institute of Sport |
| 18 | GK | Jason Blackney | 17 December 1976 (aged 16) | | (Australia) Australian Institute of Sport |

=== Argentina ===
Head coach: (Argentina) Reinaldo Merlo

| No. | Pos. | Player | Date of birth (age) | Caps | Club |
|---|---|---|---|---|---|
| 1 | GK | José Burtovoy | 6 November 1976 (aged 16) | | (Argentina) Colon de Santa Fe |
| 2 | DF | Fabricio Fuentes | 13 October 1976 (aged 16) | | (Argentina) Newell's Old Boys |
| 3 | DF | Federico Domínguez | 13 August 1976 (aged 17) | | (Argentina) Vélez Sársfield |
| 4 | DF | Milton Acosta | 3 December 1976 (aged 16) | | (Argentina) Ferro Carril Oeste |
| 5 | MF | Rodrigo Vilariño | 7 October 1976 (aged 16) | | (Argentina) River Plate |
| 6 | DF | Norberto Orrego | 21 December 1976 (aged 16) | | (Argentina) Racing Club |
| 7 | FW | Nicolás Diez | 9 February 1977 (aged 16) | | (Argentina) Argentinos Juniors |
| 8 | MF | Andrés Grande | 29 October 1976 (aged 16) | | (Argentina) Argentinos Juniors |
| 9 | FW | Leonardo Biagini | 13 April 1977 (aged 16) | | (Argentina) Newell's Old Boys |
| 10 | FW | Mauro Cantoro | 1 September 1976 (aged 16) | | (Argentina) Vélez Sársfield |
| 11 | MF | Kurt Lutman | 11 September 1976 (aged 16) | | (Argentina) Newell's Old Boys |
| 12 | GK | José Ramírez | 3 February 1977 (aged 16) | | (Argentina) San Lorenzo |
| 13 | MF | Ariel Ruggeri | 19 August 1976 (aged 17) | | (Argentina) Newell's Old Boys |
| 14 | MF | José Manuel Moreiras | 19 September 1976 (aged 16) | | (Argentina) Rosario Central |
| 15 | FW | Emiliano Romay | 25 February 1977 (aged 16) | | (Argentina) Boca Juniors |
| 16 | MF | Rubén Cantero | 9 November 1976 (aged 16) | | (Argentina) Boca Juniors |
| 17 | MF | Pablo Rodríguez | 7 March 1977 (aged 16) | | (Argentina) Argentinos Juniors |
| 18 | MF | Fernando Ariel Della Sala | 6 October 1976 (aged 16) | | (Argentina) Rosario Central |

=== Canada ===
Head coach: (Canada) Bert Goldberger

| No. | Pos. | Player | Date of birth (age) | Caps | Club |
|---|---|---|---|---|---|
| 1 | GK | Joe Ciaravino | 26 October 1976 (aged 16) | | (Canada) North York Azzurri |
| 2 | DF | Denis Peeman | 12 August 1976 (aged 17) | | (Canada) British Columbia |
| 3 | DF | Matt Mahoney | 16 February 1977 (aged 16) | | (Canada) Malton Bullets |
| 4 | DF | Milan Kojić | 7 October 1976 (aged 16) | | (Canada) Malton Bullets |
| 5 | DF | Chris Craveiro | 17 January 1977 (aged 16) | | (Canada) Victoria |
| 6 | DF | Jason Bent | 8 March 1977 (aged 16) | | (Canada) Malton Bullets |
| 7 | MF | Jeff Clarke | 18 October 1977 (aged 15) | | (Canada) Metro Ford |
| 8 | DF | Nevio Pizzolitto | 26 August 1976 (aged 16) | | (Canada) Sporting Patriots |
| 9 | MF | David Diplacido | 18 May 1977 (aged 16) | | (Canada) Scarborough |
| 10 | DF | Alvin Clyne | 19 August 1976 (aged 17) | | (Canada) Hamilton Sparta |
| 11 | FW | Paul Stalteri C | 18 October 1977 (aged 15) | | (Canada) Malton Bullets |
| 12 | FW | Agostino Vaglica | 22 April 1977 (aged 16) | | (Canada) Malton Bullets |
| 13 | FW | Chris Stathopoulos | 29 December 1977 (aged 15) | | (Canada) Laval |
| 14 | MF | Christian Salina | 12 August 1976 (aged 17) | | (Canada) Metro Ford |
| 15 | MF | Dominic Willock | 17 September 1976 (aged 16) | | (Canada) Glenshield |
| 16 | MF | Jim Brennan | 8 May 1977 (aged 16) | | (Canada) Woodbridge Strikers |
| 17 | MF | Robbie Aristodemo | 20 May 1977 (aged 16) | | (Canada) Malton Bullets |
| 18 | GK | Steve London | 3 August 1976 (aged 17) | | (Canada) North Shore |

=== Nigeria ===
Head coach: (Nigeria) Fanny Ikhayere Amun

| No. | Pos. | Player | Date of birth (age) | Caps | Club |
|---|---|---|---|---|---|
| 1 | GK | Emmanuel Babayaro | 26 December 1976 (aged 16) | | (Nigeria) Plateau United |
| 2 | DF | Patrick Oparaku | 1 December 1976 (aged 16) | | (Nigeria) Iwuanyanwu Nationale |
| 3 | DF | Celestine Babayaro | 29 August 1978 (aged 14) | | (Nigeria) Stationery Stores |
| 4 | MF | Pascal Ojigwe | 11 December 1976 (aged 16) | | (Nigeria) Enyimba |
| 5 | DF | Charles Okenedo | 10 February 1977 (aged 16) | | (Nigeria) Bendel Insurance |
| 6 | DF | Blessing Anyanwu | 22 November 1976 (aged 16) | | (Nigeria) Enyimba |
| 7 | FW | Manga Mohammed | 30 March 1977 (aged 16) | | (Nigeria) VIP |
| 8 | FW | Nwankwo Kanu | 1 August 1976 (aged 17) | | (Nigeria) Iwuanyanwu Nationale |
| 9 | FW | Festus Odini | 28 December 1976 (aged 16) | | (Nigeria) VIP |
| 10 | MF | Wilson Oruma C | 30 December 1976 (aged 16) | | (Nigeria) Bendel Insurance |
| 11 | FW | Sambo Choji | 13 March 1977 (aged 16) | | (Nigeria) Greater Tomorrow |
| 12 | GK | Emmanuel Okhenoboh | 13 November 1976 (aged 16) | | (Nigeria) Greater Tomorrow |
| 13 | FW | Ibrahim Babangida | 1 August 1976 (aged 17) | | (Nigeria) Stationery Stores |
| 14 | MF | Festus Okougha | 25 April 1977 (aged 16) | | (Nigeria) Bendel Insurance |
| 15 | DF | Eloka Asokuh | 29 November 1976 (aged 16) | | (Nigeria) Enyimba |
| 16 | DF | Abiodun Ogbebor | 12 December 1976 (aged 16) | | (Nigeria) VIP |
| 17 | FW | Peter Anosike | 24 December 1976 (aged 16) | | (Nigeria) Julius Berger |
| 18 | GK | Destiny Iyonu | 3 November 1976 (aged 16) | | (Nigeria) VIP |

== Group C ==
=== Colombia ===
Head coach: (Colombia) German González García

| No. | Pos. | Player | Date of birth (age) | Caps | Club |
|---|---|---|---|---|---|
| 1 | GK | Eduardo Calderon | 21 August 1976 (aged 17) | | (Colombia) Deportivo Cali |
| 2 | DF | Luís Oliveros | 10 February 1977 (aged 16) | | (Colombia) Unión Gemidiana |
| 3 | DF | Exson Marin | 22 February 1978 (aged 15) | | (Colombia) Boca Juniors |
| 4 | DF | José Ocampo | 26 March 1977 (aged 16) | | (Colombia) Envigado |
| 5 | DF | Alex Posada | 6 March 1977 (aged 16) | | (Colombia) Ferroclub |
| 6 | MF | Jorge Bolaño | 27 April 1977 (aged 16) | | (Colombia) Atlético Junior |
| 7 | FW | Iber Velasco | 10 December 1976 (aged 16) | | (Colombia) Atlético Nacional |
| 8 | MF | Luís Vega | 14 November 1976 (aged 16) | | (Colombia) Selección Bello |
| 9 | FW | Mauricio Ossa | 21 December 1976 (aged 16) | | (Colombia) Ferroclub |
| 10 | FW | Ricardo Ciciliano | 23 September 1976 (aged 16) | | (Colombia) Apuesta La Fortuna |
| 11 | FW | Francisco Díaz | 19 November 1976 (aged 16) | | (Colombia) Independiente Santa Fe |
| 12 | GK | Jorge Pérez | 28 December 1976 (aged 16) | | (Colombia) San Lorenzo |
| 13 | DF | Giribeth Cortes | 8 May 1978 (aged 15) | | (Colombia) Atlético Bucaramanga |
| 14 | MF | Juan Madrid | 28 October 1976 (aged 16) | | (Colombia) Atlético Nacional |
| 15 | FW | Jaime Granados | 10 August 1976 (aged 17) | | (Colombia) América de Cali |
| 16 | FW | John Ortiz | 10 April 1977 (aged 16) | | (Colombia) Atlético Nacional |
| 17 | FW | León Muñoz | 21 February 1977 (aged 16) | | (Colombia) Envigado |
| 18 | DF | Alejandro Rincon | 3 February 1977 (aged 16) | | (Colombia) Boca Juniors |

=== Qatar ===
Head coach: (Brazil) Humberto Redes Filho

| No. | Pos. | Player | Date of birth (age) | Caps | Club |
|---|---|---|---|---|---|
| 1 | GK | Amiri Ali Mohd | 18 August 1976 (aged 17) | | (Qatar) Al-Ittihad |
| 2 | DF | Ahmed Ali Al-Binali | 27 August 1977 (aged 15) | | (Qatar) Al-Arabi |
| 3 | DF | Saad Al-Mohannadi | 16 August 1976 (aged 17) | | (Qatar) Al-Tawoon |
| 4 | DF | Bakhit Al-Hamad | 17 August 1976 (aged 17) | | Qatar SC |
| 5 | MF | Tariq Abdullah | 26 August 1976 (aged 16) | | (Qatar) Al-Wakrah |
| 6 | FW | Ahmed Al-Rehaimi | 22 October 1977 (aged 15) | | Qatar SC |
| 7 | MF | Mohamed Al-Qahtani | 20 November 1976 (aged 16) | | (Qatar) Al-Rayyan |
| 8 | DF | Samer Al-Rawashda | 15 August 1976 (aged 17) | | (Qatar) Al-Rayyan |
| 9 | FW | Mohammed Salem Al-Enazi | 22 November 1976 (aged 16) | | (Qatar) Al-Rayyan |
| 10 | MF | Mohamed Nazer Ali | 15 May 1977 (aged 16) | | Qatar SC |
| 11 | MF | Rashid Al-Dosari | 1 October 1976 (aged 16) | | (Qatar) Al-Arabi |
| 12 | FW | Khalil Jamal | 5 August 1976 (aged 17) | | (Qatar) Al-Arabi |
| 13 | DF | Ahmed Al-Khater | 20 October 1976 (aged 16) | | (Qatar) Al-Wakrah |
| 14 | DF | Mohamed Yahya Ali | 11 February 1977 (aged 16) | | (Qatar) Al-Arabi |
| 15 | DF | Abdullah Al-Ishaq | 7 December 1976 (aged 16) | | (Qatar) Al-Ahli |
| 16 | FW | Hassan Al-Otaibi | 16 January 1977 (aged 16) | | (Qatar) Al-Rayyan |
| 17 | MF | Ahmed Jassim | 7 December 1977 (aged 15) | | (Qatar) Al-Ahli |
| 18 | GK | Hassan Al-Qubaisi | 17 September 1976 (aged 16) | | (Qatar) Al-Wakrah |

=== United States ===
Head coach: (United States) Roy Rees

| No. | Pos. | Player | Date of birth (age) | Caps | Club |
|---|---|---|---|---|---|
| 1 | GK | Jon Busch | 18 August 1976 (aged 17) | | (United States) Guilderland |
| 2 | DF | Josh Espinosa | 26 October 1977 (aged 15) | | (United States) Dallas Hornets |
| 3 | DF | Mark Rehklau | 12 October 1976 (aged 16) | | (United States) Pacesetter SC |
| 4 | DF | Carey Talley | 26 August 1976 (aged 16) | | (United States) Memphis FC |
| 5 | FW | Judah Cooks | 29 November 1976 (aged 16) | | (United States) Vista SC |
| 6 | DF | Randi Martinez | 1 October 1976 (aged 16) | | (United States) Whittier SC |
| 7 | MF | Deryk Shockley | 6 August 1976 (aged 17) | | (United States) Strikers |
| 8 | MF | Steve Armas | 3 February 1977 (aged 16) | | (United States) Bethesda SC |
| 9 | FW | Pierre Venditti | 22 August 1976 (aged 16) | | (United States) Central SC |
| 10 | MF | John O'Brien | 29 August 1977 (aged 15) | | (United States) California Flyers |
| 11 | MF | Jorge Flores | 13 February 1977 (aged 16) | | (United States) Cerritos SC |
| 12 | FW | Troy Garner | 15 February 1978 (aged 15) | | (United States) 78 Steamers |
| 13 | DF | Scott Vermillion | 23 December 1976 (aged 16) | | (United States) Spirit of 75 |
| 14 | MF | Jason Moore | 4 April 1978 (aged 15) | | (United States) 78 Steamers |
| 15 | MF | Tony Soto | 1 October 1976 (aged 16) | | (United States) Inter 76 |
| 16 | MF | Andriy Shapowal | 5 August 1976 (aged 17) | | (United States) E/W Ambassadors |
| 17 | FW | Keith McDaniel | 7 March 1977 (aged 16) | | (United States) Texans |
| 18 | GK | Andy Kirk | 3 October 1977 (aged 15) | | (United States) Mequon SC |

=== Representation of Czechs and Slovaks (RCS) ===
Head coach: (Czech Republic) Józef Krejča

| No. | Pos. | Player | Date of birth (age) | Caps | Club |
|---|---|---|---|---|---|
| 1 | GK | Jakub Kafka | 16 October 1976 (aged 16) | | (Czech Republic) Baník Ostrava |
| 2 | MF | Józef Kotula | 20 September 1976 (aged 16) | | (Slovakia) FC Nitra |
| 3 | DF | Richard Spanik | 24 August 1976 (aged 16) | | (Slovakia) FC Nitra |
| 4 | DF | Miroslav Rada | 6 August 1976 (aged 17) | | (Czech Republic) Sparta Prague |
| 5 | DF | Marián Ďatko | 18 June 1977 (aged 16) | | (Slovakia) FC Nitra |
| 6 | MF | Miroslav Vápeník | 25 August 1976 (aged 16) | | (Czech Republic) Sparta Prague |
| 7 | MF | Karol Kisel | 15 March 1977 (aged 16) | | (Slovakia) Lokomotíva Košice |
| 8 | MF | Libor Sionko | 1 February 1977 (aged 16) | | (Czech Republic) Baník Ostrava |
| 9 | FW | Robert Hanko | 28 December 1976 (aged 16) | | (Slovakia) Slovan Bratislava |
| 10 | FW | Petr Ruman | 2 November 1976 (aged 16) | | (Czech Republic) Baník Ostrava |
| 11 | FW | Jiří Kopúnek | 22 August 1976 (aged 16) | | (Czech Republic) Brno |
| 12 | DF | Robert Padych | 19 August 1976 (aged 17) | | (Slovakia) Dukla Banská Bystrica |
| 13 | MF | Zoltán Novota | 23 December 1976 (aged 16) | | (Slovakia) Dunajská Streda |
| 14 | MF | Jiří Šanda | 18 May 1977 (aged 16) | | (Czech Republic) Viktoria Plzeň |
| 15 | DF | Marek Jankulovski C | 9 May 1977 (aged 16) | | (Czech Republic) Baník Ostrava |
| 16 | MF | Patrik Jezek | 28 December 1976 (aged 16) | | (Czech Republic) Viktoria Plzeň |
| 17 | MF | Vladimir Helbich | 14 September 1976 (aged 16) | | (Slovakia) Dukla Banská Bystrica |
| 18 | GK | Radim Straka | 7 September 1976 (aged 16) | | (Czech Republic) Mladá Boleslav |

== Group D ==
=== Chile ===
Head coach: (Chile) Leonardo Véliz

| No. | Pos. | Player | Date of birth (age) | Caps | Club |
|---|---|---|---|---|---|
| 1 | GK | Ariel Salas | 9 October 1976 (aged 16) | | (Chile) Colo-Colo |
| 2 | MF | Silvio Rojas | 21 September 1977 (aged 15) | | (Chile) Universidad Católica |
| 3 | DF | Marco Muñoz | 27 September 1976 (aged 16) | | (Chile) Colo-Colo |
| 4 | DF | Nelson Garrido | 12 February 1977 (aged 16) | | (Chile) Universidad Católica |
| 5 | DF | Gustavo Valenzuela | 5 April 1977 (aged 16) | | (Chile) O'Higgins |
| 6 | DF | Dion Valle | 22 July 1977 (aged 16) | | (Chile) Colo-Colo |
| 7 | DF | Esteban Mancilla | 30 September 1976 (aged 16) | | (Chile) Colo-Colo |
| 8 | MF | René Martínez | 11 August 1976 (aged 17) | | Universidad de Chile |
| 9 | MF | Alejandro Osorio | 24 September 1976 (aged 16) | | (Chile) O'Higgins |
| 10 | MF | Frank Lobos | 25 September 1976 (aged 16) | | (Chile) Colo-Colo |
| 11 | FW | Sebastián Rozental | 1 September 1976 (aged 16) | | (Chile) Universidad Católica |
| 12 | GK | Carlos Torres | 23 July 1977 (aged 16) | | (Chile) Universidad Católica |
| 13 | MF | Héctor Tapia | 30 September 1977 (aged 15) | | (Chile) Colo-Colo |
| 14 | MF | Pablo Herceg | 19 January 1977 (aged 16) | | (Chile) Universidad Católica |
| 15 | FW | Patricio Galaz | 31 December 1976 (aged 16) | | (Chile) Universidad Católica |
| 16 | FW | Mauricio Rojas | 1 August 1976 (aged 17) | | (Chile) Coquimbo Unido |
| 17 | FW | Manuel Neira | 12 October 1977 (aged 15) | | (Chile) Colo-Colo |
| 18 | DF | Dante Poli | 16 August 1976 (aged 17) | | (Chile) Universidad Católica |

=== China PR ===
Head coach: (China) Zhang Zhicheng

| No. | Pos. | Player | Date of birth (age) | Caps | Club |
|---|---|---|---|---|---|
| 1 | GK | Zhang Pengsheng | 14 September 1976 (aged 16) | | (China) Shandong |
| 2 | DF | Li Bin | 8 October 1976 (aged 16) | | (China) Shandong |
| 3 | DF | Yu Yuanwei | 26 September 1976 (aged 16) | | (China) Shandong |
| 4 | DF | Liu Yibing | 9 November 1976 (aged 16) | | (China) Army |
| 5 | DF | Li Ming | 4 May 1975 (aged 18) | | (China) Shandong |
| 6 | MF | Li Xiaopeng | 5 November 1976 (aged 16) | | (China) Shandong |
| 7 | MF | Yu Genwei | 19 August 1976 (aged 17) | | (China) Tianjin |
| 8 | MF | Pang Li | 8 December 1976 (aged 16) | | (China) Liaoning |
| 9 | FW | Pei Jin | 2 November 1976 (aged 16) | | (China) Tianjin |
| 10 | FW | Gao Fulin | 21 December 1976 (aged 16) | | (China) Yunnan |
| 11 | FW | Yao Xia | 28 January 1974 (aged 19) | | (China) Sichuan |
| 12 | FW | Lin Jinyu | 7 June 1977 (aged 16) | | (China) Liaoning |
| 13 | MF | Song Yuming | 30 August 1976 (aged 16) | | (China) Shandong |
| 14 | MF | Qu Shengqing | 5 June 1975 (aged 18) | | (China) Liaoning |
| 15 | DF | Xiao Zhanbo | 22 July 1975 (aged 18) | | (China) Liaoning |
| 16 | FW | Liu Yue | 12 July 1975 (aged 18) | | (China) Shandong |
| 17 | MF | Song Lihui | 12 August 1976 (aged 17) | | (China) Liaoning |
| 18 | GK | Zhao Dali | 8 August 1976 (aged 17) | | (China) Army |

=== Tunisia ===
Head coach: (Tunisia) Jameleddine Abassi

| No. | Pos. | Player | Date of birth (age) | Caps | Club |
|---|---|---|---|---|---|
| 1 | GK | Khaled Azaïez | 30 October 1976 (aged 16) | | (Tunisia) Club Africain |
| 2 | DF | Hamdi Marzouki | 23 January 1977 (aged 16) | | (Tunisia) Club Africain |
| 3 | DF | Mehdi Znaidi | 25 August 1976 (aged 16) | | (Tunisia) CO Transports |
| 4 | DF | Tarek Ben Chrouda | 13 October 1976 (aged 16) | | (Tunisia) AS Marsa |
| 5 | DF | Nabil Aouadi | 2 September 1976 (aged 16) | | (Tunisia) Club Africain |
| 6 | DF | Riadh Ben Salem | 16 January 1977 (aged 16) | | (Tunisia) Megrine Sport |
| 7 | MF | Kamel Saada | 28 April 1977 (aged 16) | | (Tunisia) Olympique du Kef |
| 8 | MF | Tarek Lahdhiri | 3 August 1976 (aged 17) | | (Tunisia) Espérance |
| 9 | FW | Mohamed El Echi | 12 January 1978 (aged 15) | | (Tunisia) AS Marsa |
| 10 | MF | Wajdi Ben Ahmed | 28 September 1976 (aged 16) | | (Tunisia) FSK Gafsa |
| 11 | FW | Fayzal Arouri | 7 August 1976 (aged 17) | | (Tunisia) Espérance |
| 12 | DF | Nejib Jouini | 12 September 1976 (aged 16) | | (Tunisia) CO Transports |
| 13 | MF | Walid Ghribi | 3 August 1976 (aged 17) | | (Tunisia) CS Sfaxien |
| 15 | MF | Badreddine El Ouni | 12 February 1977 (aged 16) | | (Tunisia) Espérance |
| 16 | GK | Khaled Fadhel | 29 September 1976 (aged 16) | | (Tunisia) Club Africain |
| 17 | MF | Moussa Wissem | 25 August 1976 (aged 16) | | (Tunisia) Étoile du Sahel |
| 18 | MF | Bader Ben Ghalia | 24 January 1977 (aged 16) | | (Tunisia) Espérance |

- Only 17 players in Tunisia squad. (N°14) Imed Mhedhebi FW 22/3/1976 Etoile du Sahel.

=== Poland ===
Head coach: (Poland) Andrzej Zamilski

| No. | Pos. | Player | Date of birth (age) | Caps | Club |
|---|---|---|---|---|---|
| 1 | GK | Andrzej Bledzewski | 2 July 1977 (aged 16) | | (Poland) Bałtyk Gdynia |
| 2 | DF | Mirosław Szymkowiak | 12 November 1976 (aged 16) | | (Poland) Olimpia Poznań |
| 3 | DF | Mariusz Kukiełka | 7 November 1976 (aged 16) | | (Poland) Siarka Tarnobrzeg |
| 4 | DF | Marcin Drajer | 21 August 1976 (aged 17) | | (Poland) Lech Poznań |
| 5 | DF | Marcin Thiede | 13 September 1976 (aged 16) | | (Poland) Zawisza Bydgoszcz |
| 6 | MF | Jacek Magiera | 1 January 1977 (aged 16) | | (Poland) Raków Częstochowa |
| 7 | MF | Marek Kowalczyk | 17 January 1977 (aged 16) | | (Poland) Włókniarz Wrocław |
| 8 | MF | Marcin Szulik | 10 January 1977 (aged 16) | | (Poland) Dozamet Nowa Sól |
| 9 | MF | Wojciech Rajtar | 18 September 1976 (aged 16) | | (Poland) Hutnik Kraków |
| 10 | MF | Maciej Terlecki | 9 March 1977 (aged 16) | | (Poland) Polonia Warsaw |
| 11 | FW | Artur Andruszczak | 11 June 1977 (aged 16) | | (Poland) Stilon Gorzów Wielkopolski |
| 12 | GK | Sylwester Janowski | 8 December 1976 (aged 16) | | (Poland) Siarka Tarnobrzeg |
| 13 | FW | Piotr Bielak | 4 September 1976 (aged 16) | | (Poland) Lublinianka Lublin |
| 14 | DF | Artur Wyczałkowski | 21 August 1976 (aged 17) | | (Poland) Petrochemia Płock |
| 15 | MF | Arkadiusz Radomski | 27 June 1977 (aged 16) | | (Poland) Lech Poznań |
| 16 | FW | Tomasz Kosztowniak | 13 January 1977 (aged 16) | | (Poland) Śląsk Wrocław |
| 17 | FW | Piotr Orliński | 22 September 1976 (aged 16) | | (Poland) Sarmata Warsaw |
| 18 | FW | Artur Wichniarek | 28 February 1977 (aged 16) | | (Poland) Lech Poznań |
