= 1993 UEFA European Under-16 Championship squads =

Football tournament squads

Those marked in bold have later been capped at full International level.

== Group A ==
=== Iceland ===
Head coach:

=== Northern Ireland ===
Head coach:

=== Poland ===
Head coach: Andrzej Zamilski

No.	Pos.	Player	Date of birth (age)	Club
	GK	Sylwester Janowski	8 December 1976 (aged 16)	(Polish Football Association) Siarka Tarnobrzeg
	GK	**Andrzej Bledzewski**	2 July 1977 (aged 15)	(Polish Football Association) Bałtyk Gdynia
	DF	**Mirosław Szymkowiak**	12 November 1976 (aged 16)	(Polish Football Association) Olimpia Poznań
	DF	Marcin Thiede	13 September 1976 (aged 16)	(Polish Football Association) Zawisza Bydgoszcz
	DF	Artur Wyczałkowski	21 August 1976 (aged 16)	(Polish Football Association) Wisła Płock
	DF	Marcin Drajer	21 June 1976 (aged 16)	(Polish Football Association) Lech Poznań
	MF	**Maciej Terlecki**	9 March 1977 (aged 16)	(Polish Football Association) Polonia Warsaw
	MF	Wojciech Rajtar	18 September 1976 (aged 16)	(Polish Football Association) Hutnik Kraków
	MF	**Mariusz Kukiełka**	7 November 1976 (aged 16)	(Polish Football Association) Siarka Tarnobrzeg
	MF	Jacek Magiera	1 January 1977 (aged 16)	(Polish Football Association) Raków Częstochowa
	MF	**Arkadiusz Radomski**	27 June 1977 (aged 15)	(Polish Football Association) Mieszko Gniezno
	MF	Marcin Szulik	10 January 1977 (aged 16)	(Polish Football Association) Polonia Nowa Sól
	MF	Marek Kowalczyk	17 January 1977 (aged 16)	(Polish Football Association) Parasol Wrocław
	FW	Piotr Bielak	4 September 1976 (aged 16)	(Polish Football Association) KS Lublinianka
	FW	Tomasz Kosztowniak	13 January 1977 (aged 16)	(Polish Football Association) Śląsk Wrocław
	FW	Artur Andruszczak	11 June 1977 (aged 15)	(Polish Football Association) Stilon Gorzów

=== Switzerland ===
Head coach:

== Group B ==
=== Greece ===
Head coach:

=== Hungary ===
Head coach: Elemér Piski

No.	Pos.	Player	Date of birth (age)	Club
	GK	Attila Horváth	1 January 1977 (aged 16)	(Hungarian Football Federation) Lenti Tempo TE
	GK	Miklós Rácz	2 November 1976 (aged 16)	(Hungarian Football Federation) BVSC
	DF	Szabolcs Werner	11 September 1976 (aged 16)	(Hungarian Football Federation) BVSC
	DF	Gábor Hungler	1 February 1977 (aged 16)	(Hungarian Football Federation) Budapest Honvéd
	DF	Sándor Fórizs	11 March 1977 (aged 16)	(Hungarian Football Federation) Vasas
	DF	József Boda	21 August 1976 (aged 16)	(Hungarian Football Federation) Vác FC
	DF	Csaba Szabados	14 December 1976 (aged 16)	(Hungarian Football Federation) Ferencvárosi TC
	MF	**György Korsós**	22 August 1976 (aged 16)	(Hungarian Football Federation) Győri ETO
	MF	Attila Fekete	4 August 1976 (aged 16)	(Hungarian Football Federation) Budapest Honvéd
	MF	Tamás Segovits	12 November 1976 (aged 16)	(Hungarian Football Federation) Győri ETO
	MF	**Norbert Tóth**	11 August 1976 (aged 16)	(Hungarian Football Federation) Haladás VSE
	MF	Norbert Kovács	26 December 1976 (aged 16)	(Hungarian Football Federation) Debreceni VSC
	MF	**Zsolt Dvéri**	1 August 1976 (aged 16)	(Hungarian Football Federation) Videoton-Waltham
	FW	**Gábor Torma**	1 August 1976 (aged 16)	(Hungarian Football Federation) Dunaferr
	FW	**Krisztián Kenesei**	7 January 1977 (aged 16)	(Hungarian Football Federation) MTK
	FW	Zoltán Szabó	23 August 1977 (aged 15)	(Hungarian Football Federation) MTK

=== Spain ===
Head coach: Juan Santisteban

No.	Pos.	Player	Date of birth (age)	Club
	GK	Jon Ander	6 September 1976 (aged 16)	(Royal Spanish Football Federation) Racing Santander B
	GK	Josma	1 January 1977 (aged 16)	(Royal Spanish Football Federation) Real Madrid
	DF	Miguel Alfonso	9 September 1976 (aged 16)	(Royal Spanish Football Federation) Real Zaragoza
	DF	Mingo	10 June 1976 (aged 16)	(Royal Spanish Football Federation) Barcelona C
	DF	Jose María Méndez Castro	9 September 1976 (aged 16)	(Royal Spanish Football Federation) Sevilla FC
	DF	Juan Redondo	17 July 1977 (aged 15)	(Royal Spanish Football Federation) Real Betis
	MF	Curro Montoya	13 February 1977 (aged 16)	(Royal Spanish Football Federation) Valencia CF
	MF	Francisco Rufete	20 November 1976 (aged 16)	(Royal Spanish Football Federation) Barcelona B
	MF	Daniel Vidal Sanromán	1 January 1977 (aged 16)	(Royal Spanish Football Federation) Celta Vigo
	MF	Toni Velamazán	22 January 1977 (aged 16)	(Royal Spanish Football Federation) CF Damm
	MF	Roger García Junyent	15 December 1976 (aged 16)	(Royal Spanish Football Federation) Barcelona B
	MF	Álvaro Benito	10 December 1976 (aged 16)	(Royal Spanish Football Federation) Real Madrid
	MF	Fernando José Lorenzo Fernández	9 September 1976 (aged 16)	(Royal Spanish Football Federation) Caixa Galicia FC
	FW	Diego Ribera	19 February 1977 (aged 16)	(Royal Spanish Football Federation) Valencia CF
	FW	Ricardo García Sánchez	22 January 1977 (aged 16)	(Royal Spanish Football Federation) Valencia CF
	FW	Raúl Calle Vicente	10 November 1976 (aged 16)	(Royal Spanish Football Federation) Sestao River Club

=== Turkey ===
Head coach:

No.	Pos.	Player	Date of birth (age)	Caps	Goals	Club
	DF	Alparslan Tice	29 May 1977 (aged 15)			
	MF	**Ayhan Akman**	23 February 1977 (aged 16)			(Turkish Football Federation) İnegölspor
		Cihangir Kabakçi	12 May 1975 (aged 17)			
		Hakim Toplu	1 January 1977 (aged 16)			
	MF	İlker Dalçiçek	10 May 1977 (aged 15)			
	MF	Mustafa Külle	4 August 1976 (aged 16)			
	DF	Okan Özke	5 August 1977 (aged 15)			
		Osman Tan	28 October 1977 (aged 15)			
		Ramazan Gürbüz	5 May 1977 (aged 15)			
	FW	**Serdar Topraktepe**	25 August 1976 (aged 16)			(Turkish Football Federation) Fatih Karagümrük
		Ümit Özişik	17 August 1976 (aged 16)			
		Fatih Sezer	21 October 1976 (aged 16)			
		Hakan Can	10 October 1976 (aged 16)			
	MF	Hikmet Çapanoğlu	29 October 1976 (aged 16)			
		Yildiray Arslan	22 October 1976 (aged 16)			

== Group C ==
=== Belgium ===
Head coach:

=== Czechoslovakia ===
Head coach:

=== England ===
Head coach:

No.	Pos.	Player	Date of birth (age)	Club
1	GK	Neil Cutler	3 September 1976 (aged 16)	(The Football Association) Aston Villa
2	DF	Phil Neville	21 January 1977 (aged 16)	(The Football Association) Manchester United
3	GK	R Taylor	1 January 1977 (aged 16)	NA
4	DF	Jon O'Connor	29 October 1976 (aged 16)	(The Football Association) Everton
5	DF	Chris Plummer	12 October 1976 (aged 16)	(The Football Association) Queens Park Rangers
6	DF	Jamie Howell	19 February 1977 (aged 16)	NA
7	MF	David Beresford	11 November 1976 (aged 16)	(The Football Association) Oldham Athletic
8	MF	Simon Spencer	10 September 1976 (aged 16)	(The Football Association) Tottenham Hotspur
9	FW	C Ellis	10 September 1976 (aged 16)	NA
10	FW	Neil Mustoe	5 November 1976 (aged 16)	(The Football Association) Manchester United
11	MF	Terry Cooke	5 August 1976 (aged 16)	(The Football Association) Manchester United
12	MF	Paul Wharton	3 September 1976 (aged 16)	(The Football Association) Leeds United
13		Mark Walley	17 September 1976 (aged 16)	(The Football Association) Nottingham Forest
14		L Hines	1 January 1977 (aged 16)	NA
15		I Smith	1 January 1977 (aged 16)	NA

=== Republic of Ireland ===
Head coach:

== Group D ==
=== France ===
Head coach:Christian Damiano

No.	Pos.	Player	Date of birth (age)	Caps	Goals	Club
1	GK	Christophe Eggimann	23 September 1976 (aged 16)			
2	DF	Jean-Sebastien Jaures	30 September 1977 (aged 15)			
3	MF	Arnaud Cramette				
4	DF	Bruno Ithurria	23 January 1977 (aged 16)			
5	DF	Sebastien Dailly	6 December 1976 (aged 16)			
6	DF	Pierre Ducrocq	18 December 1976 (aged 16)			
7	MF	Eric Lestang				
8	DF	Johan Radet	24 January 1977 (aged 16)			
9	FW	Cedric Bardon	15 October 1976 (aged 16)			
10	MF	Youssef Moustaid	21 August 1976 (aged 16)			
11	FW	Fabrice Lepaul	17 November 1976 (aged 16)			
12	MF	John Serville				
13	MF	Didier Neumann	13 January 1977 (aged 16)			
14	FW	Benoit Le Bris	1 December 1976 (aged 16)			
15	FW	Loic Chaveriat	5 February 1977 (aged 16)			
16	GK	Bertrand Laquait	13 April 1977 (aged 16)			

=== Italy ===
Head coach: Sergio Vatta

No.	Pos.	Player	Date of birth (age)	Club
1	GK	Marco Caterini	14 April 1977 (aged 16)	(Italian Football Federation) AS Roma
2	DF	Gianpaolo Castorina	30 August 1976 (aged 16)	(Italian Football Federation) AC Milan
3	DF	David Giubilato	13 September 1976 (aged 16)	(Italian Football Federation) Torino
4	DF	Nicola Antonio Calabro	10 August 1976 (aged 16)	(Italian Football Federation) Lazio
5	DF	Enrico Morello	17 January 1977 (aged 16)	(Italian Football Federation) Parma
6	MF	Luca Vigiani	17 January 1977 (aged 16)	(Italian Football Federation) AC Fiorentina
7	FW	Carmelo Aguilera	2 February 1977 (aged 16)	(Italian Football Federation) AC Milan
8	FW	**Francesco Totti**	27 September 1976 (aged 16)	(Italian Football Federation) AS Roma
9	FW	Francesco De Francesco	21 September 1977 (aged 15)	(Italian Football Federation) AC Milan
10	DF	Dario Dossi	17 January 1977 (aged 16)	(Italian Football Federation) Brescia
11	MF	Daniele Di Donato	21 February 1977 (aged 16)	(Italian Football Federation) Torino
12	GK	**Gianluigi Buffon**	28 January 1978 (aged 15)	(Italian Football Federation) Parma
13	DF	Luca Gallipoli	8 August 1976 (aged 16)	(Italian Football Federation) Torino
14	DF	Fabrizio Stringardi	16 September 1976 (aged 16)	(Italian Football Federation) Torino
15	MF	Nicola Ferrarini	9 January 1977 (aged 16)	(Italian Football Federation) Parma
16	MF	Roberto Magnani	13 January 1977 (aged 16)	(Italian Football Federation) Parma

=== Portugal ===
Head coach: Rui Caçador

No.	Pos.	Player	Date of birth (age)	Club
1	GK	Correia	31 August 1976 (aged 16)	(Portuguese Football Federation) FC Porto
2	DF	Viúla	6 September 1976 (aged 16)	(Portuguese Football Federation) FC Porto
3	DF	Marco Almeida	4 April 1977 (aged 16)	(Portuguese Football Federation) Sporting CP
4	MF	Pedro Ratinho	5 December 1976 (aged 16)	(Portuguese Football Federation) Benfica
5	DF	**Mário Silva**	24 April 1977 (aged 16)	(Portuguese Football Federation) Boavista
6	DF	Miguel Gama	29 June 1977 (aged 15)	(Portuguese Football Federation) Sporting CP
7	FW	Emanuel	6 July 1977 (aged 15)	(Portuguese Football Federation) FC Porto
8	MF	Simão	26 November 1976 (aged 16)	(Portuguese Football Federation) Boavista
9	DF	Patacas	30 November 1977 (aged 15)	(Portuguese Football Federation) Sporting CP
10	DF	Carlos Lopes	27 August 1976 (aged 16)	(Portuguese Football Federation) Boavista
11	DF	Tiago Costa	26 October 1976 (aged 16)	(Portuguese Football Federation) FC Porto
12	GK	Rui santos	14 February 1977 (aged 16)	(Portuguese Football Federation) Sporting CP
13	FW	Pisco	2 February 1977 (aged 16)	(Portuguese Football Federation) Benfica
14	MF	**Dani**	2 November 1976 (aged 16)	(Portuguese Football Federation) Sporting CP
15	FW	**Edgar**	7 August 1977 (aged 15)	(Portuguese Football Federation) Benfica
16	MF	Paulo Augusto	20 March 1977 (aged 16)	(Portuguese Football Federation) Farense

=== Russia ===
Head coach:
