= Football at the 1996 Summer Olympics – Men's team squads =

This page lists the squads for the men's football at the 1996 Summer Olympics.

Overage players are marked with * and players added due to injury are marked with °.

== Group A ==
=== Argentina ===
Head coach: Daniel Passarella

No.	Pos.	Player	Date of birth (age)	Caps	Club
1	GK	Carlos Bossio	1 December 1973 (aged 22)		(Argentina) Estudiantes de La Plata
2	DF	Roberto Ayala	14 April 1973 (aged 23)		(Italy) Napoli
3	DF	José Chamot*	17 May 1969 (aged 27)		(Italy) Lazio
4	DF	Javier Zanetti	10 August 1973 (aged 22)		(Italy) Internazionale
5	MF	Matías Almeyda	21 December 1973 (aged 22)		(Argentina) River Plate
6	DF	Roberto Sensini*	12 October 1966 (aged 29)		(Italy) Parma
7	FW	Claudio López	17 July 1974 (aged 22)		(Spain) Valencia
8	MF	Diego Simeone*	28 April 1970 (aged 26)		(Spain) Atlético Madrid
9	FW	Hernán Crespo	5 July 1975 (aged 21)		(Italy) Parma
10	MF	Ariel Ortega	4 March 1974 (aged 22)		(Argentina) River Plate
11	MF	Hugo Morales	30 July 1974 (aged 21)		(Argentina) Lanús
12	GK	Pablo Cavallero	13 April 1974 (aged 22)		(Argentina) Vélez Sársfield
13	MF	Héctor Pineda	13 July 1975 (aged 21)		(Argentina) Boca Juniors
14	DF	Pablo Paz	27 January 1973 (aged 23)		(Argentina) Banfield
15	MF	Christian Bassedas	16 February 1973 (aged 23)		(Argentina) Vélez Sársfield
16	MF	Gustavo López	13 April 1973 (aged 23)		(Spain) Real Zaragoza
17	FW	Marcelo Delgado	24 March 1973 (aged 23)		(Argentina) Racing Club
18	MF	Marcelo Gallardo	18 January 1976 (aged 20)		(Argentina) River Plate

=== Portugal ===
Head coach: Nelo Vingada

No.	Pos.	Player	Date of birth (age)	Caps	Club
1	GK	Costinha	22 September 1973 (aged 22)		(Portugal) Sporting CP
2	DF	Kenedy	18 February 1974 (aged 22)		(Portugal) Benfica
3	DF	Rui Bento*	14 January 1972 (aged 24)		(Portugal) Boavista
4	MF	Peixe	16 January 1973 (aged 23)		(Spain) Sevilla
5	DF	Beto	3 May 1976 (aged 20)		(Portugal) Sporting CP
6	DF	Andrade	30 September 1973 (aged 22)		(Portugal) Estrela da Amadora
7	MF	José Dominguez	16 February 1974 (aged 22)		(Portugal) Sporting CP
8	FW	Capucho*	21 February 1972 (aged 24)		(Portugal) Vitória de Guimarães
9	FW	Paulo Alves*	10 December 1969 (aged 26)		(Portugal) Sporting CP
10	MF	Afonso Martins	11 April 1973 (aged 23)		(Portugal) Sporting CP
11	DF	Rui Jorge	27 March 1973 (aged 23)		(Portugal) Porto
12	GK	Nuno	25 January 1974 (aged 22)		(Portugal) Vitória de Guimarães
13	MF	Vidigal	15 March 1973 (aged 23)		(Portugal) Sporting CP
14	MF	Calado	16 February 1974 (aged 22)		(Portugal) Benfica
15	FW	Nuno Gomes	5 July 1976 (aged 20)		(Portugal) Boavista
16	FW	Porfírio	28 September 1973 (aged 22)		(Portugal) Sporting CP
17	DF	Litos	25 February 1974 (aged 22)		(Portugal) Boavista
18	FW	Dani	2 November 1976 (aged 19)		(Netherlands) Ajax
20	DF	Nuno Afonso°	6 October 1974 (aged 21)		(Portugal) Benfica

=== Tunisia ===
Head coach: (Poland) Henryk Kasperczak

No.	Pos.	Player	Date of birth (age)	Caps	Club
1	GK	Chokri El Ouaer*	15 August 1966 (aged 29)		(Tunisia) Espérance
2	FW	Imed Ben Younes	16 June 1974 (aged 22)		(Tunisia) Étoile du Sahel
3	DF	Lotfi Baccouche	19 June 1973 (aged 23)		(Tunisia) Étoile du Sahel
4	DF	Khaled Badra	8 April 1973 (aged 23)		(Tunisia) Espérance
5	DF	Mohamed Mkacher	25 May 1975 (aged 21)		(Tunisia) Étoile du Sahel
6	DF	Ferid Chouchane	19 April 1973 (aged 23)		(Tunisia) Étoile du Sahel
7	MF	Maher Kanzari	17 March 1973 (aged 23)		(Tunisia) Stade Tunisien
8	MF	Zoubeir Baya*	16 May 1971 (aged 25)		(Tunisia) Étoile du Sahel
9	FW	Hassan Gabsi	23 February 1974 (aged 22)		(Tunisia) Espérance
10	MF	Kaies Ghodhbane	7 January 1976 (aged 20)		(Tunisia) Étoile du Sahel
11	FW	Adel Sellimi	16 November 1972 (aged 23)		(Tunisia) Club Africain
12	MF	Marouane Bokri	28 December 1974 (aged 21)		(Tunisia) Espérance
13	MF	Riadh Bouazizi	8 April 1973 (aged 23)		(Tunisia) Étoile du Sahel
14	DF	Sabri Jaballah	28 June 1973 (aged 23)		(Tunisia) Avenir Sportif de La Marsa
15	DF	Radhi Jaïdi	30 August 1975 (aged 20)		(Tunisia) Étoile du Sahel
16	GK	Hamdi Baba	12 August 1975 (aged 20)		(Tunisia) Étoile du Sahel
17	MF	Tarek Ben Chrouda	13 October 1976 (aged 19)		(Tunisia) Avenir Sportif de La Marsa
18	FW	Mehdi Ben Slimane	1 January 1974 (aged 22)		(Tunisia) Avenir Sportif de La Marsa

=== United States ===
Head coach: Bruce Arena

No.	Pos.	Player	Date of birth (age)	Caps	Club
1	GK	Kasey Keller*	29 November 1969 (aged 26)		(England) Millwall
2	DF	Matt McKeon	24 September 1974 (aged 21)		(United States) Kansas City Wiz
3	MF	Billy Walsh	17 October 1975 (aged 20)		(United States) University of Virginia
4	DF	Eddie Pope	24 December 1973 (aged 22)		(United States) D.C. United
5	DF	Clint Peay	16 September 1973 (aged 22)		(United States) D.C. United
6	DF	Alexi Lalas*	1 June 1970 (aged 26)		(United States) New England Revolution
7	MF	Imad Baba	15 March 1974 (aged 22)		(United States) New England Revolution
8	FW	Jovan Kirovski	18 March 1976 (aged 20)		(England) Manchester United
9	FW	A. J. Wood	8 August 1973 (aged 22)		(United States) MetroStars
10	MF	Claudio Reyna	20 July 1973 (aged 23)		(Germany) Bayer Leverkusen
11	MF	Miles Joseph	2 May 1974 (aged 22)		(United States) MetroStars
12	DF	Brandon Pollard	9 October 1973 (aged 22)		(United States) Dallas Burn
13	MF	Frankie Hejduk	5 August 1974 (aged 21)		(United States) Tampa Bay Mutiny
14	MF	Brian Maisonneuve	28 June 1973 (aged 23)		(United States) Columbus Crew
15	FW	Nelson Vargas	6 August 1974 (aged 21)		(United States) Tampa Bay Mutiny
16	MF	Rob Smith	20 August 1973 (aged 22)		(United States) Columbus Crew
17	MF	Damian Silvera	27 July 1974 (aged 21)		(United States) MetroStars
18	GK	Chris Snitko	24 January 1973 (aged 23)		(United States) Kansas City Wiz

== Group B ==
=== Australia ===
Head coach: (Scotland) Eddie Thomson

No.	Pos.	Player	Date of birth (age)	Caps	Club
1	GK	Frank Jurić	28 October 1973 (aged 22)		(Australia) Melbourne Knights
2	MF	Goran Lozanovski	11 January 1974 (aged 22)		(Australia) Adelaide City
3	DF	Ante Morić	19 April 1974 (aged 22)		(Australia) Sydney United
4	DF	Mark Babić	24 April 1973 (aged 23)		(Australia) Sydney United
5	DF	Kevin Muscat	7 August 1973 (aged 22)		(England) Crystal Palace
6	DF	Steve Horvat*	14 March 1971 (aged 25)		(Croatia) Hajduk Split
7	MF	Peter Tsekenis	4 August 1973 (aged 22)		(Australia) Sydney Olympic
8	MF	Steve Corica	24 March 1973 (aged 23)		(England) Wolverhampton Wanderers
9	FW	Mark Viduka	9 October 1975 (aged 20)		(Croatia) Dinamo Zagreb
10	FW	Aurelio Vidmar*	3 February 1967 (aged 29)		(Switzerland) Sion
11	MF	Danny Tiatto	22 May 1973 (aged 23)		(Australia) Melbourne Knights
12	FW	Joe Spiteri	6 May 1973 (aged 23)		(Australia) Melbourne Knights
13	DF	Hayden Foxe	23 June 1977 (aged 19)		(Netherlands) Ajax
14	FW	Paul Agostino	9 June 1975 (aged 21)		(England) Bristol City
15	MF	Luke Casserly	11 December 1973 (aged 22)		(Australia) Marconi Stallions
16	MF	Robert Enes	22 August 1975 (aged 20)		(Australia) Sydney United
17	MF	Ross Aloisi	17 April 1973 (aged 23)		(Australia) Adelaide Sharks
18	GK	Michael Petković	16 July 1976 (aged 20)		(Australia) South Melbourne

=== France ===
Head coach: Raymond Domenech

No.	Pos.	Player	Date of birth (age)	Caps	Club
1	GK	Lionel Letizi	28 May 1973 (aged 23)		(France) Nice
2	DF	Martin Djetou	15 December 1974 (aged 21)		(France) Strasbourg
3	DF	Jérôme Bonnissel	4 January 1973 (aged 23)		(France) Montpellier
4	DF	Florent Laville	7 August 1973 (aged 22)		(France) Lyon
5	DF	Patrick Moreau	3 November 1973 (aged 22)		(France) Bastia
6	MF	Patrick Vieira	23 June 1976 (aged 20)		(Italy) AC Milan
7	MF	Claude Makélélé	18 February 1973 (aged 23)		(France) Nantes
8	MF	Vikash Dhorasoo	10 October 1973 (aged 22)		(France) Le Havre
9	FW	Florian Maurice	20 May 1974 (aged 22)		(France) Lyon
10	MF	Antoine Sibierski	5 August 1974 (aged 21)		(France) Lille
11	MF	Robert Pires	29 October 1973 (aged 22)		(France) Metz
12	DF	Geoffray Toyes	18 May 1973 (aged 23)		(France) Bordeaux
13	DF	Vincent Candela	24 October 1973 (aged 22)		(France) Guingamp
14	MF	Olivier Dacourt	25 September 1974 (aged 21)		(France) Strasbourg
15	FW	Tony Vairelles	10 April 1973 (aged 23)		(France) Lens
16	GK	Vincent Fernández	31 January 1975 (aged 21)		(France) Châteauroux
17	FW	Sylvain Wiltord	10 May 1974 (aged 22)		(France) Rennes
18	MF	Sylvain Legwinski	10 June 1973 (aged 23)		(France) AS Monaco
20	DF	Oumar Dieng°	30 December 1972 (aged 23)		(France) Paris Saint-Germain

=== Saudi Arabia ===
Head coach: (Brazil) Ivo Wortmann

No.	Pos.	Player	Date of birth (age)	Caps	Club
1	GK	Hussein Al-Sadiq	15 October 1973 (aged 22)		(Saudi Arabia) Al-Qadisiya
2	DF	Mohammed Al-Jahani	28 September 1975 (aged 20)		(Saudi Arabia) Al-Ahli
3	DF	Abdullah Alwaked Al-Shahrani	29 September 1975 (aged 20)		(Saudi Arabia) Al-Shabab
4	DF	Mohammed Al-Khilaiwi*	24 May 1971 (aged 25)		(Saudi Arabia) Al-Ittihad
5	DF	Abdullah Zubromawi	15 November 1973 (aged 22)		(Saudi Arabia) Al-Ahli
6	MF	Fuad Anwar*	13 October 1972 (aged 23)		(Saudi Arabia) Al-Shabab
7	MF	Khamis Al-Zahrani	3 August 1976 (aged 19)		(Saudi Arabia) Al Ittihad
8	DF	Hussein Sulaimani	21 January 1977 (aged 19)		(Saudi Arabia) Al-Ahli
9	FW	Hamza Falatah*	8 October 1972 (aged 23)		(Saudi Arabia) Ohud
10	MF	Ibrahim Al-Harbi	10 July 1975 (aged 21)		(Saudi Arabia) Al Nassr
11	FW	Obeid Al-Dosari	2 October 1975 (aged 20)		(Saudi Arabia) Al Wehda
12	MF	Hussain Al-Masaari	16 August 1974 (aged 21)		(Saudi Arabia) Al Hilal
13	MF	Khalid Al-Rashaid	3 August 1974 (aged 21)		(Saudi Arabia) Al Hilal
14	MF	Abdullah Al-Karni	8 August 1976 (aged 19)		(Saudi Arabia) Al Nassr
15	DF	Abdul Aziz Al-Marzoug	16 July 1975 (aged 21)		(Saudi Arabia) Al Nassr
16	MF	Khamis Alowairan Al-Dosari	8 September 1973 (aged 22)		(Saudi Arabia) Al Hilal
17	FW	Abdul Rahman Sifeen	12 June 1974 (aged 22)		(Saudi Arabia) Al-Ahli
18	GK	Rashed Al-Mugren	7 November 1977 (aged 18)		(Saudi Arabia) Al-Shabab

=== Spain ===
Head coach: Javier Clemente

No.	Pos.	Player	Date of birth (age)	Caps	Club
1	GK	Juan Luis Mora	12 July 1973 (aged 23)		(Spain) Real Oviedo
2	MF	Gaizka Mendieta	27 March 1974 (aged 22)		(Spain) Valencia
3	DF	Agustín Aranzábal	15 March 1973 (aged 23)		(Spain) Real Sociedad
4	DF	Javi Navarro	6 February 1974 (aged 22)		(Spain) Valencia
5	DF	Santi	9 March 1974 (aged 22)		(Spain) Atlético Madrid
6	MF	Óscar	26 April 1973 (aged 23)		(Spain) Barcelona
7	FW	Raúl	27 June 1977 (aged 19)		(Spain) Real Madrid
8	MF	Roberto	15 January 1973 (aged 23)		(Spain) Espanyol
9	DF	Sergio Corino	10 October 1974 (aged 21)		(Spain) Athletic Bilbao
10	MF	José Ignacio	28 September 1973 (aged 22)		(Spain) Valencia
11	MF	Iñigo Idiakez	8 November 1973 (aged 22)		(Spain) Real Sociedad
12	DF	Aitor Karanka	8 August 1973 (aged 22)		(Spain) Athletic Bilbao
13	GK	Jorge Aizkorreta	6 February 1974 (aged 22)		(Spain) Athletic Bilbao
14	FW	Fernando Morientes	5 April 1976 (aged 20)		(Spain) Real Zaragoza
15	MF	Iván de la Peña	6 May 1975 (aged 21)		(Spain) Barcelona
16	FW	Jordi Lardín	4 June 1973 (aged 23)		(Spain) Espanyol
17	DF	Sietes	18 February 1974 (aged 22)		(Spain) Valencia
18	FW	Dani	22 December 1974 (aged 21)		(Spain) Real Zaragoza

== Group C ==
=== Ghana ===
Head coach: Sam Arday

No.	Pos.	Player	Date of birth (age)	Caps	Club
1	GK	Richard Kingson	13 June 1978 (aged 18)		(Ghana) Great Olympics
2	DF	Jacob Nettey	25 January 1976 (aged 20)		(Ghana) Hearts of Oak
3	FW	Nii Welbeck	3 October 1976 (aged 19)		(Switzerland) Winterthur
4	DF	Stephen Baidoo	25 February 1976 (aged 20)		(Ghana) Goldfields
5	DF	Joseph Addo*	21 September 1971 (aged 24)		(Germany) FSV Frankfurt
6	DF	Afo Duodo	23 November 1973 (aged 22)		(Greece) Kalamata
7	DF	Samuel Kuffour	3 September 1976 (aged 19)		(Germany) Bayern Munich
8	MF	Mallam Yahaya	31 December 1974 (aged 21)		(Germany) Borussia Dortmund
9	FW	Augustine Ahinful	30 November 1974 (aged 21)		(Switzerland) Kriens
10	MF	Charles Akonnor	12 March 1974 (aged 22)		(Germany) Fortuna Köln
11	FW	Emmanuel Duah	14 November 1976 (aged 19)		(Turkey) Eskişehirspor
12	FW	Felix Aboagye	5 December 1975 (aged 20)		(Egypt) Al Ahly
13	MF	Ohene Kennedy	28 April 1973 (aged 23)		(Saudi Arabia) Al Nassr
14	MF	Ebenezer Hagan	1 October 1975 (aged 20)		(Greece) Kalamata
15	DF	Christian Saba	29 December 1978 (aged 17)		(Germany) Bayern Munich
16	GK	Simon Addo	11 December 1974 (aged 21)		(Ghana) Ghapoha Readers
17	FW	Emmanuel Kuffour	6 April 1976 (aged 20)		(Ghana) Ebusua Dwarfs
18	FW	Prince Koranteng Amoako	19 November 1973 (aged 22)		(Ghana) Asante Kotoko

=== Italy ===
Head coach: Cesare Maldini

No.	Pos.	Player	Date of birth (age)	Caps	Club
1	GK	Gianluca Pagliuca*	18 December 1966 (aged 29)		(Italy) Internazionale
3	DF	Alessandro Nesta	19 March 1976 (aged 20)		(Italy) Lazio
4	DF	Fabio Cannavaro	13 September 1973 (aged 22)		(Italy) Parma
5	DF	Fabio Galante	20 November 1973 (aged 22)		(Italy) Genoa
6	DF	Salvatore Fresi	16 January 1973 (aged 23)		(Italy) Internazionale
7	MF	Raffaele Ametrano	15 February 1973 (aged 23)		(Italy) Udinese
8	MF	Massimo Crippa*	17 May 1965 (aged 31)		(Italy) Parma
9	FW	Marco Branca*	6 January 1965 (aged 31)		(Italy) Internazionale
10	MF	Massimo Brambilla	4 March 1973 (aged 23)		(Italy) Parma
11	FW	Marco Delvecchio	7 April 1973 (aged 23)		(Italy) Roma
12	GK	Gianluigi Buffon	28 January 1978 (aged 18)		(Italy) Parma
13	DF	Alessandro Pistone	27 July 1975 (aged 20)		(Italy) Internazionale
14	MF	Damiano Tommasi	17 May 1974 (aged 22)		(Italy) Verona
15	MF	Fabio Pecchia	24 August 1973 (aged 22)		(Italy) Napoli
16	MF	Domenico Morfeo	16 January 1976 (aged 20)		(Italy) Atalanta
17	FW	Cristiano Lucarelli	4 October 1975 (aged 20)		(Italy) Cosenza
18	MF	Antonino Bernardini	21 June 1974 (aged 22)		(Italy) Torino
19	DF	Luigi Sartor°	30 January 1975 (aged 21)		(Italy) Vicenza

=== South Korea ===
Head coach: (Russia) Anatoliy Byshovets

No.	Pos.	Player	Date of birth (age)	Caps	Club
1	GK	Seo Dong-myung	4 May 1974 (aged 22)		(South Korea) Ulsan Hyundai Horangi
2	DF	Park Choong-kyun	20 June 1973 (aged 23)		(South Korea) Suwon Samsung Bluewings
3	DF	Choi Sung-yong	25 December 1975 (aged 20)		(South Korea) Korea University
4	DF	Lee Sang-hun	11 October 1975 (aged 20)		(South Korea) Dongguk University
5	DF	Lee Kyung-soo	28 October 1973 (aged 22)		(South Korea) Suwon Samsung Bluewings
6	DF	Lee Ki-hyung	28 September 1974 (aged 21)		(South Korea) Suwon Samsung Bluewings
7	MF	Lee Woo-young	19 August 1973 (aged 22)		(Japan) Ōita Trinity
8	MF	Yoon Jung-hwan	16 February 1973 (aged 23)		(South Korea) Bucheon Yukong
9	FW	Chung Sang-nam	7 September 1975 (aged 20)		(South Korea) Yonsei University
10	FW	Choi Yong-soo	10 September 1973 (aged 22)		(South Korea) Anyang LG Cheetahs
11	FW	Lee Won-shik	16 May 1973 (aged 23)		(South Korea) Bucheon Yukong
12	GK	Lee Dae-hee	26 April 1974 (aged 22)		(South Korea) Ajou University
13	DF	Kim Hyun-su	14 February 1973 (aged 23)		(South Korea) Jeonnam Dragons
14	DF	Kim Sang-hoon	3 June 1973 (aged 23)		(South Korea) Ulsan Hyundai Horangi
15	DF	Lee Lim-saeng*	18 November 1971 (aged 24)		(South Korea) Bucheon Yukong
16	DF	Choi Yoon-yeol	17 April 1974 (aged 22)		(South Korea) Kyung Hee University
17	MF	Ha Seok-ju*	20 February 1968 (aged 28)		(South Korea) Busan Daewoo Royals
18	FW	Hwang Sun-hong*	14 July 1968 (aged 28)		(South Korea) Pohang Atoms
19	DF	Lee Kyung-chun°	14 April 1969 (aged 27)		(South Korea) Jeonbuk Dinos

=== Mexico ===
Head coach: Carlos de los Cobos

No.	Pos.	Player	Date of birth (age)	Caps	Club
1	GK	Oswaldo Sánchez	21 September 1973 (aged 22)		(Mexico) América
2	DF	Claudio Suárez*	16 December 1968 (aged 27)		(Mexico) UNAM
3	DF	David Oteo	27 July 1973 (aged 22)		(Mexico) UNAM
4	MF	Germán Villa	2 April 1973 (aged 23)		(Mexico) América
5	DF	Duilio Davino	21 March 1976 (aged 20)		(Mexico) UAG
6	MF	Raúl Lara	28 February 1973 (aged 23)		(Mexico) América
7	MF	Rafael García	14 August 1974 (aged 21)		(Mexico) UNAM
8	MF	Manuel Sol	31 August 1973 (aged 22)		(Mexico) Necaxa
9	GK	Jorge Campos*	15 October 1966 (aged 29)		(United States) Los Angeles Galaxy
10	MF	Luis García*	1 June 1969 (aged 27)		(Mexico) América
11	FW	Cuauhtémoc Blanco	17 January 1973 (aged 23)		(Mexico) América
12	DF	Francisco Sánchez	30 January 1973 (aged 23)		(Mexico) América
13	DF	Pável Pardo	26 July 1976 (aged 19)		(Mexico) Atlas
14	MF	Edson Alvarado	27 September 1975 (aged 20)		(Mexico) Necaxa
15	MF	Jesús Arellano	8 May 1973 (aged 23)		(Mexico) Monterrey
16	FW	Enrique Alfaro	11 December 1974 (aged 21)		(Mexico) Toluca
17	FW	Francisco Palencia	28 April 1973 (aged 23)		(Mexico) Cruz Azul
18	FW	José Manuel Abundis	11 June 1973 (aged 23)		(Mexico) Toluca

== Group D ==
=== Brazil ===
Head coach: Zagallo

No.	Pos.	Player	Date of birth (age)	Caps	Club
1	GK	Dida	7 October 1973 (aged 22)		(Brazil) Cruzeiro
2	DF	Zé María	25 July 1973 (aged 22)		(Brazil) Flamengo
3	DF	Aldair*	30 November 1965 (aged 30)		(Italy) Roma
4	DF	Ronaldo Guiaro	18 February 1974 (aged 22)		(Brazil) Atlético Mineiro
5	MF	Flávio Conceição	13 June 1974 (aged 22)		(Brazil) Palmeiras
6	DF	Roberto Carlos	10 April 1973 (aged 23)		(Italy) Internazionale
7	FW	Bebeto*	16 February 1964 (aged 32)		(Spain) Deportivo La Coruña
8	MF	Amaral	28 February 1973 (aged 23)		(Brazil) Palmeiras
9	MF	Juninho	22 February 1973 (aged 23)		(England) Middlesbrough
10	MF	Rivaldo*	19 April 1972 (aged 24)		(Brazil) Palmeiras
11	FW	Sávio	9 January 1974 (aged 22)		(Brazil) Flamengo
12	GK	Danrlei	18 April 1973 (aged 23)		(Brazil) Grêmio
13	DF	Narciso	23 December 1973 (aged 22)		(Brazil) Santos
14	MF	André Luiz	11 June 1974 (aged 22)		(Brazil) São Paulo
15	MF	Zé Elias	25 September 1976 (aged 19)		(Brazil) Corinthians
16	MF	Marcelinho	13 September 1973 (aged 22)		(Brazil) Corinthians
17	FW	Luizão	14 November 1975 (aged 20)		(Brazil) Palmeiras
18	FW	Ronaldo	22 September 1976 (aged 19)		(Netherlands) PSV

=== Hungary ===
Head coach: Antal Dunai

No.	Pos.	Player	Date of birth (age)	Caps	Club
1	GK	Lajos Szűcs	8 August 1973 (aged 22)		(Hungary) Újpest
3	DF	Vilmos Sebők	13 June 1973 (aged 23)		(Hungary) Újpest
5	DF	Zoltán Petö	19 September 1974 (aged 21)		(Hungary) Debrecen
6	MF	Miklós Lendvai	7 April 1975 (aged 21)		(Hungary) Zalaegerszeg
7	MF	Tibor Dombi	11 November 1973 (aged 22)		(Hungary) Debrecen
8	MF	Tamás Sándor	26 October 1974 (aged 21)		(Hungary) Debrecen
9	FW	Károly Szanyó	10 November 1973 (aged 22)		(Hungary) Újpest
10	MF	Krisztián Lisztes	2 July 1976 (aged 20)		(Hungary) Ferencváros
11	FW	Gábor Egressy	11 February 1974 (aged 22)		(Hungary) Újpest
12	DF	Zoltán Molnár	4 November 1973 (aged 22)		(Hungary) BVSC Budapest
13	FW	Csaba Madar	8 October 1974 (aged 21)		(Hungary) Debrecen
14	FW	Gábor Zavadszky	10 September 1974 (aged 21)		(Hungary) Ferencváros
15	FW	Sándor Preisinger	11 December 1973 (aged 22)		(Hungary) Zalaegerszeg
16	DF	Csaba Szatmári	2 November 1973 (aged 22)		(Hungary) Debrecen
17	DF	Attila Dragóner	15 November 1974 (aged 21)		(Hungary) Stadler
18	GK	Szabolcs Sáfár	20 August 1977 (aged 18)		(Hungary) Vasas
19	FW	Miklós Herczeg°	26 March 1974 (aged 22)		(Hungary) Újpest
21	FW	Zoltán Bükszegi°	16 December 1975 (aged 20)		(Hungary) BVSC Budapest

=== Japan ===
Head coach: Akira Nishino

No.	Pos.	Player	Date of birth (age)	Caps	Club
1	GK	Yoshikatsu Kawaguchi	15 August 1975 (aged 20)		(Japan) Yokohama Marinos
2	DF	Hiroyuki Shirai	17 June 1974 (aged 22)		(Japan) Shimizu S-Pulse
3	DF	Hideto Suzuki	7 October 1974 (aged 21)		(Japan) Júbilo Iwata
4	MF	Yuji Hironaga	25 July 1975 (aged 20)		(Japan) Verdy Kawasaki
5	DF	Makoto Tanaka	8 August 1975 (aged 20)		(Japan) Júbilo Iwata
6	MF	Toshihiro Hattori	23 September 1973 (aged 22)		(Japan) Júbilo Iwata
7	MF	Masakiyo Maezono	29 October 1973 (aged 22)		(Japan) Yokohama Flügels
8	MF	Teruyoshi Ito	31 August 1974 (aged 21)		(Japan) Shimizu S-Pulse
9	FW	Shoji Jo	17 June 1975 (aged 21)		(Japan) JEF United Ichihara
10	MF	Akihiro Endo	18 September 1975 (aged 20)		(Japan) Yokohama Marinos
11	FW	Shigeru Morioka	12 August 1973 (aged 22)		(Japan) Gamba Osaka
12	DF	Kenichi Uemura	22 April 1974 (aged 22)		(Japan) Sanfrecce Hiroshima
13	DF	Naoki Matsuda	14 March 1977 (aged 19)		(Japan) Yokohama Marinos
14	MF	Hidetoshi Nakata	22 January 1977 (aged 19)		(Japan) Bellmare Hiratsuka
15	MF	Tadahiro Akiba	13 October 1975 (aged 20)		(Japan) JEF United Ichihara
16	FW	Yoshika Matsubara	19 August 1974 (aged 21)		(Japan) Shimizu S-Pulse
17	MF	Ryuji Michiki	25 August 1973 (aged 22)		(Japan) Sanfrecce Hiroshima
18	GK	Takashi Shimoda	28 November 1975 (aged 20)		(Japan) Sanfrecce Hiroshima

=== Nigeria ===
Head coach: (Netherlands) Jo Bonfrere

No.	Pos.	Player	Date of birth (age)	Caps	Club
1	GK	Emmanuel Babayaro	26 December 1976 (aged 19)		(Nigeria) Plateau United
2	DF	Celestine Babayaro	29 August 1978 (aged 17)		(Belgium) Anderlecht
3	DF	Taribo West	26 March 1974 (aged 22)		(France) Auxerre
4	FW	Nwankwo Kanu	1 August 1976 (aged 19)		(Netherlands) Ajax
5	DF	Uche Okechukwu*	27 September 1967 (aged 28)		(Turkey) Fenerbahçe
6	MF	Emmanuel Amunike*	25 December 1970 (aged 25)		(Portugal) Sporting CP
7	MF	Tijani Babangida	25 December 1973 (aged 22)		(Netherlands) Roda
8	MF	Wilson Oruma	30 December 1976 (aged 19)		(France) Lens
9	MF	Teslim Fatusi	17 September 1977 (aged 18)		(Hungary) Ferencváros
10	MF	Jay-Jay Okocha	14 August 1973 (aged 22)		(Germany) Eintracht Frankfurt
11	FW	Victor Ikpeba	12 June 1973 (aged 23)		(France) AS Monaco
12	DF	Abiodun Obafemi	25 December 1973 (aged 22)		(France) Toulouse
13	FW	Garba Lawal	22 May 1974 (aged 22)		(Tunisia) Espérance
14	FW	Daniel Amokachi*	30 December 1972 (aged 23)		(England) Everton
15	MF	Sunday Oliseh	1 September 1974 (aged 21)		(Germany) 1. FC Köln
16	DF	Kingsley Obiekwu	12 November 1974 (aged 21)		(Netherlands) Go Ahead Eagles
17	DF	Mobi Oparaku	1 December 1976 (aged 19)		(Belgium) Anderlecht
18	GK	Dosu Joseph	19 June 1977 (aged 19)		(Nigeria) Julius Berger
