= Babayaro =

Babayaro is a surname. Notable people with the surname include:

- Celestine Babayaro (born 1978), Nigerian footballer
- Emmanuel Babayaro (born 1976), Nigerian footballer
