= Ďatko =

Ďatko, also Datko, is a surname. Notable people with the surname include:

- Andrew Datko (born 1990), American football player
- Marián Ďatko (born 1977), Slovak footballer
- Samuel Ďatko (born 2001), Slovak footballer
