= José Moreira (disambiguation) =

José Moreira is a footballer.

José Moreira may also refer to:

- José Moreira (swimmer)
- José Carlos Moreira, Brazilian sprinter
- José Hermes Moreira
- José Moreira (athlete) in 2009 World Championships in Athletics – Men's Marathon
- José Antônio Moreira, Count of Ipanema
- José Alberto Tavares Moreira

== See also ==
- José Moreiras
