= Welbeck (disambiguation) =

Welbeck is a village near Worksop, Nottinghamshire, England

Welbeck may also refer to:

== Places ==
- Welbeck, Ontario, Canada
- Welbeck Defence Sixth Form College, a defence sixth form college, near Loughborough, Leicestershire, England, formerly housed in Welbeck Abbey
- Welbeck Colliery Village, former name of Meden Vale, near Welbeck village
- Norton, Cuckney, Holbeck and Welbeck, a civil parish in Nottinghamshire

== Surname ==
- Danny Welbeck (born 1990), English footballer
- Nii Welbeck (1976–2014), retired Ghanaian footballer
- Peter Welbeck, a pseudonym of Harry Alan Towers (1920–2009), a radio and film producer and screenwriter

== Other uses ==
- Creswell and Welbeck railway station, a former station in Derbyshire
