= Lord Morgan =

Lord Morgan may refer to:

- Kenneth O. Morgan, Baron Morgan (born 1934), Welsh historian and author
- Lord Morgan (musician) (born 1986), Ghanaian dancehall and afrobeats musician

== See also ==
- Baroness Morgan (disambiguation)
