= Ali Jarrah =

Ghanaian goalkeeper (born 1958)

Ali Jarrah is a former Ghanaian professional footballer who was a member of the Ghana team that won the FIFA U-17 World Cup in 1991 and came in second in 1993.

== Football career ==
Jarrah played at both international and club levels in the position of goalkeeper and was part of the 1991 Ghana U-17 team that won the 1991 FIFA U-17 World Cup. He was the starting goalkeeper for the 1993 Ghana U-17 team that came in second in the 1993 FIFA U-17 World Cup.

During his club career, Jarrah played in the Ghana Premier League for Accra Hearts of Oak S.C., the oldest surviving Ghanaian professional football club, where he received many accolades. In 1993, he received offers to join both Liverpool F.C. and FC Köln and was called up by the Ghana national football team. However, before leaving for Germany, he suffered an injury in a Ghana Premier League match against Asante Kotoko S.C. that permanently ended his career. Due to complications resulting from his injury, Jarrah was temporarily paralyzed in September 1993.

== Later life ==
Following the end of his playing career, Jarrah began working as a football coach and trainer. He has both coached and advocated for individuals with disabilities in sports. Currently, Jarrah runs a goalkeeper training academy in Accra that has received recognition from the Ghana Football Association. He regularly engages in football commentary, including for the Ghanaian Times, ModernGhana and GhanaWeb.

== Personal life ==
Jarrah describes the day that he learned of the severity of his injury as "the worst day in his life." He has been open about the personal and mental health struggles that he experienced following his career-ending injury. Jarrah has also described feeling neglected after the end of his professional career.
