= Dortsedor River =

River in Ghana

Location
- Countries: Ghana

The Dortsedor River is a river located along the Afienya-Dawhenya road in the Greater Accra Region of Ghana.
