= Krisztián Lisztes (footballer, born 1976) =

Hungarian footballer (born 1976)

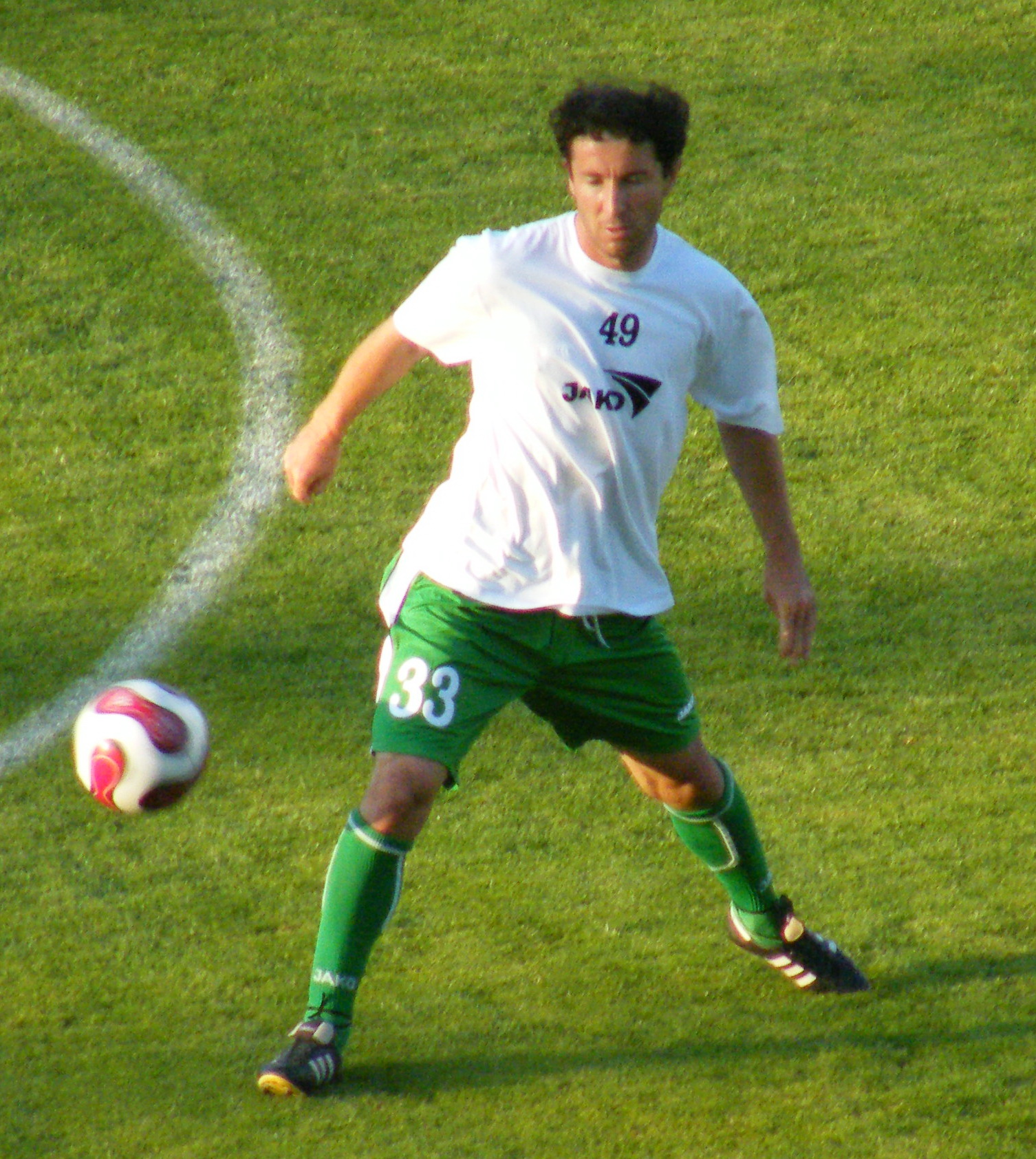

Personal information
- Date of birth: 2 July 1976 (age 50)
- Place of birth: Budapest, Hungary
- Height: 1.79 m (5 ft 10 in)
- Position: Central midfielder

Youth career
- 1985–1993: Ferencváros

Senior career*
Years	Team	Apps	(Gls)
1993–1996	Ferencváros	80	(19)
1996–2001	VfB Stuttgart	109	(12)
2001–2005	Werder Bremen	92	(8)
2005–2006	Borussia Mönchengladbach	5	(0)
2007	Hajduk Split	0	(0)
2008	Ferencváros	11	(0)
2008	Rákospalota	14	(4)
2009	Hansa Rostock	13	(1)
2009–2011	Paks	29	(2)
2011	Vasas	14	(1)
2011–2012	Ferencváros	23	(1)
2012	Szeged 2011	13	(5)
2013–2015	Soroksár	56	(15)
Total		459	(68)

International career
1996–1997	Hungary U-21	2	(0)
1994–2004	Hungary	49	(9)
- * Club domestic league appearances and goals

Krisztián Lisztes (Hungarian pronunciation: [ˈkristiaːn ˈlistɛʃ]; born 2 July 1976) is a Hungarian former professional footballer who played as a central midfielder. He is most commonly known for his stints at VfB Stuttgart and Werder Bremen in the Bundesliga, and for Ferencváros (three separate spells) in his home country.

== Club career ==
Born in Budapest, Lisztes began his professional career as a midfielder, playing for the Hungarian team Ferencváros, where he was brought up through the youth academy. He was considered by many as one of the biggest talents of Hungarian football. He became a member of the first team in 1993 at the age of 17, when he had to replace Hungary's then probably biggest star Lajos Détári on a quick note when Détári was transferred to Italy.

He led Ferencváros to the group stages of the UEFA Champions League in 1995, making them the first Hungarian team to get there. Scoring the first goal against Grasshoppers in a 3–0 victory, he also became the first ever Hungarian player to score in the Champions League group stages.

His performances at the European level caught the attention of several big clubs and he would go on to join VfB Stuttgart in 1996. Many considered this move as premature as Stuttgart's then playmaker Bulgarian Krasimir Balakov had a solid place in the team, and Lisztes indeed had to spend some time on the reserves bench, but later he became a regular in the team, and played there till 2001 before moving to Werder Bremen. His successes include DFB-Pokal triumphs with Stuttgart in 1997 and Werder in 2004, as well as the 2004 league title with Werder.

In 2004, he sustained an injury and never fully regained his fitness at Werder. In 2005, following trials with Wigan Athletic of the Premier League and ChievoVerona of the Serie A, he joined Borussia Mönchengladbach, but failed to make a serious impact as a result of his continued injury problems. After a brief spell in Croatia with Hajduk Split he rejoined his childhood team Ferencváros in February 2008, but moved on to REAC only after a few months. On 3 August 2008, he scored his first goal in the Hungarian league after 12 years.

On 12 January 2009, he left REAC and joined Hansa Rostock on a free transfer and signed a contract till 30 June 2009. He left Rostock after his contract ended, and on 24 June 2009 signed for Paksi SE.

== International career ==
In 1994, Lisztes debuted in the Hungary national team where to this day he gained 49 caps and scored 9 goals. He was last capped in 2004.

During the 1995–96 season, he was a member of the Hungary Olympic Football team, which won qualification to the 1996 Summer Olympics in Atlanta. Hungary lost all of their three group matches on the Olympics, their opponent including future gold medal winners Nigeria, and Brazil with the likes of Dida, Ronaldo, Rivaldo, Roberto Carlos and Juninho Paulista in their squad. This was the last occasion to this day, when the Hungary football team managed to qualify for the Olympics.

== Personal life ==
He is married and has a daughter and a son. His son, Krisztián Lisztes Jr is also a professional footballer.

== Career statistics ==
=== Club ===
Appearances and goals by club, season and competition
Club	Season	League			Cup		Continental		Other		Total		Ref.
Club	Season	Division	Apps	Goals	Apps	Goals	Apps	Goals	Apps	Goals	Apps	Goals	Ref.
Ferencváros	1994–95	Nemzeti Bajnokság I					4	1	–		4	1	
Ferencváros	1995–96	Nemzeti Bajnokság I					8	2	–		8	2	
Ferencváros	1996–97	Nemzeti Bajnokság I					3	2	–		3	2	
Ferencváros	Total						15	5			15	5	–
VfB Stuttgart	1996–97	Bundesliga	12	1	0	0	0	0	–		12	1	
VfB Stuttgart	1997–98	Bundesliga	14	2	2	0	4	0	1 (Note: One appearance in DFL-Ligapokal)	0	21	2	
VfB Stuttgart	1998–99	Bundesliga	31	2	4	2	3	0	3 (Note: Three appearances in DFL-Ligapokal)	0	41	4	
VfB Stuttgart	1999–2000	Bundesliga	29	4	3	1	0	0	–		32	5	
VfB Stuttgart	2000–01	Bundesliga	23	3	4	0	8	0	–		35	3	
VfB Stuttgart	Total		109	12	13	3	15	0	4	0	141	15	–
Werder Bremen	2001–02	Bundesliga	29	5	2	0	1	0	–		32	5	
Werder Bremen	2002–03	Bundesliga	31	0	4	0	4	1	1 (Note: One appearance in DFL-Ligapokal)	0	40	1	
Werder Bremen	2003–04	Bundesliga	30	3	5	0	4	0	–		39	3	
Werder Bremen	2004–05	Bundesliga	2	0	1	0	0	0	–		3	0	
Werder Bremen	Total		92	8	12	0	9	1	1	0	114	9	–
Borussia Mönchengladbach	2005–06	Bundesliga	5	0	1	0					6	0	
Ferencváros	2007–08	Nemzeti Bajnokság II	11	0							11	0	
Rákospalotai EAC	2008–09	Nemzeti Bajnokság I	14	4							14	4	
Hansa Rostock	2008–09	2. Bundesliga	13	1	1	0					14	1	
Paks	2009–10	Nemzeti Bajnokság I	23	2							23	2	
Paks	2010–11	Nemzeti Bajnokság I	6	0							6	0	
Paks	Total		29	2							29	2	–
Vasas	2010–11	Nemzeti Bajnokság I	14	1							14	1	
Ferencváros	2011–12	Nemzeti Bajnokság I	23	1							23	1	
Szeged 2011	2012–13	Nemzeti Bajnokság II	13	5							13	5	
Soroksár SC	2012–13	Nemzeti Bajnokság III	13	1							13	1	
Soroksár SC	2013–14	Nemzeti Bajnokság III	28	14							28	14	
Soroksár SC	2014–15	Nemzeti Bajnokság II	15	0							15	0	
Soroksár SC	Total		56	15							56	15	–
Career total			379	49	27	3	39	6	5	0	450	58	–

=== International ===
Scores and results list Hungary's goal tally first, score column indicates score after each Lisztes goal.

List of international goals scored by Krisztián Lisztes
No.	Date	Venue	Opponent	Score	Result	Competition
1	11 October 2000	Kaunas, Lithuania	Lithuania	6–1 (p)	6–1	FIFA World Cup 2002 Qualification
2	14 November 2001	Budapest, Hungary	North Macedonia	1–0	5–0	Friendly
3	14 November 2001	Budapest, Hungary	North Macedonia	5–0	5–0	Friendly
4	2 April 2003	Budapest, Hungary	Sweden	1–1	1–2	UEFA Euro 2004 Qualification
5	30 April 2003	Budapest, Hungary	Luxembourg	3–1	5–1	Friendly
6	11 June 2003	Serravalle, San Marino	San Marino	2–0	5–0	UEFA Euro 2004 Qualification
7	11 June 2003	Serravalle, San Marino	San Marino	5–0	5–0	UEFA Euro 2004 Qualification
8	10 September 2003	Riga, Latvia	Latvia	1–3	1–3	UEFA Euro 2004 Qualification
9	18 February 2004	Paphos, Cyprus	Armenia	2–0	2–0	Friendly

== Honours ==
Ferencváros

- Nemzeti Bajnokság I: 1994–95, 1995–96
- Magyar Kupa: 1993–94, 1994–95
- Szuperkupa: 1993, 1994, 1995

VfB Stuttgart

- DFB-Pokal: 1996–97
- UEFA Cup Winners' Cup: runners-up 1997–98
- UEFA Intertoto Cup: 2000

Werder Bremen

- Bundesliga: 2003–04
- DFB-Pokal: 2003–04

Paksi SE

- Ligakupa: runners-up 2009–10

Individual

- Hungarian Footballer of the Year: 2002
