= Baroness Morgan =

Baroness Morgan may refer to:

- Nicky Morgan, Baroness Morgan of Cotes (born 1972), British Conservative Party politician and former Secretary of State for Digital, Culture, Media and Sport
- Delyth Morgan, Baroness Morgan of Drefelin (born 1961), British politician, formerly for the Labour Party, later a crossbencher
- Eluned Morgan, Baroness Morgan of Ely (born 1967), British Labour Party politician and First Minister of Wales from 2024 to 2026
- Sally Morgan, Baroness Morgan of Huyton (born 1959), British Labour Party politician

== See also ==
- Sydney, Lady Morgan (c. 1781 – 1859), Irish novelist
- Lord Morgan (disambiguation)
