= Fabrice Lepaul =

French footballer (1976–2020)

Personal information
- Date of birth: 17 November 1976
- Place of birth: Épinal, France
- Date of death: 23 May 2020 (aged 43)
- Place of death: Baldenheim, France
- Height: 1.70 m (5 ft 7 in)
- Position: Striker

Senior career*
Years	Team	Apps	(Gls)
1993–1998	Auxerre	32	(6)
1998–1999	Saint-Étienne	5	(2)
2000	Cannes	4	(0)
2000–2002	Auxerre II		
2002–2003	Colmar		
2003–2004	Strasbourg		
2004	Obernai		
2005	Épinal		

International career
1992–1993	France U16		
- * Club domestic league appearances and goals

Fabrice Lepaul (17 November 1976 – 23 May 2020) was a French professional footballer who played as a striker. He was a squad member for the 1993 UEFA European Under-16 Championship.

== Club career ==
Lepaul was part of the AJ Auxerre team that won the 1995–96 French Division 1. He was considered a promising young talent in the squad. However, Lepaul suffered from serious injuries due to a road accident in October 1997, which left him in a short coma and three broken ribs. Lepaul never gained his form after the injury recover and was released by Auxerre in 1998.

== Personal life ==
Lepaul's son Esteban is also a footballer and also plays as striker.

Lepaul died on 23 May 2020 in a car accident that occurred during the night of Thursday to Friday in the Baldenheim sector, in the Alsace region of north-eastern France.

== Honours ==
Auxerre

- French Division 1: 1995–96
- Coupe de France: 1993–94, 1995–96
- UEFA Intertoto Cup: 1997

Saint-Étienne

- French Division 2: 1998–99
