= Hamdi Marzouki =

Tunisian footballer (born 1977)

Personal information
- Full name: Hamdi Marzouki
- Date of birth: 23 January 1977 (age 49)
- Place of birth: Mégrine, Tunisia
- Height: 1.82 m (6 ft 0 in)
- Position: Defender

Senior career*
Years	Team	Apps	(Gls)
2000–2002	Club Africain	50	(4)
2002–2004	Stade Tunisien	57	(6)
2004–2005	Club Africain	64	(3)
2005–2006	Dibba Al-Fujairah	117	(18)
2006–2007	Al-Arabi	0	(0)
2007–2008	CS Hammam-Lif	-	(-)
2008–2010	CA Bizertin	21	(1)
2010–2011	AS Gabès	22	(1)
2011–2012	Salgaocar SC		

International career^{‡}
1990–1993	Tunisia U-17	?	(?)
2000–2004	Tunisia	24	(1)
- * Club domestic league appearances and goals as of December 10, 2006 ‡ National team caps and goals as of December 10, 2006

Hamdi Marzouki (Arabic: حمدي مرزوقي; born 23 January 1977) is a Tunisian former professional footballer who played as a defender. From 2000 to 2004, he represented the Tunisia national football team internationally and played at the 2002 FIFA World Cup in Korea-Japan. Marzouki has also represented Tunisia in the 1993 FIFA U-17 World Championship.

== Club career ==
=== Club Africain ===
Marzouki began his professional career with Tunisian Ligue Professionnelle 1 side Club Africain in 2000 and played for the club twice. In 2001, he helped Club Africain reach the semi-finals of the African Cup Winners' Cup. Between 2000 and 2002, he appeared in 50 league matches and scored 4 goals.

=== Stade Tunisien ===
In 2002, he signed with Stade Tunisien of the Tunisian Ligue Professionnelle 1 and appeared in 57 league matches, scoring 6 goals. With the Tunisian side, he won the Tunisian Coupe de la Ligue Professionnelle in 2002 and Tunisian President's Cup in 2003.

=== Back to Africain ===
After his stint with Stade Tunisien from 2002 to 2004, he came back to Club Africain and earned a total of 104 caps for the club (including two spells), scoring 7 goals. He has also captained the team in domestic tournaments.

=== Later career ===
He also played domestically for clubs like Dibba Al-Fujairah Club of United Arab Emirates, Al-Arabi SC of Kuwait, CS Hammam-Lif, CA Bizertin and Avenir Sportif de Gabès of Tunisia and Salgaocar SC of India.

=== Dibba Al-Fujairah ===
His major achievements are winning the UAE First Division League with Emirati giants Dibba Al-Fujairah Club in 2005–06 season and Kuwait Super Cup with Al-Arabi. He played more than 115 games for the side as a defender alongside scoring 18 goals in the league. He was the highest scoring defender for the Fujairah-based side.

=== Salgaocar ===
On 7 January 2011, he penned the contract with Indian I-League outfit Salgaocar SC as a foreign recruit under coaching of Karim Bencherifa. However, he have not appeared in any league match for the club. Though it was his last stint in club football and later he retired in 2011.

== International career ==
Marzouki was called up for the national team of Tunisia by then manager Franco Scoglio in 2000. He made his senior international debut in a friendly match against Switzerland on 15 November 2000, which ended as 1–1.

He was a member of the Tunisian national team at the 2002 FIFA World Cup, where they finished at the bottom. He was listed in the World Cup squad by then manager Ammar Souayah but Marzouki was on the bench in all the three group stage matches.

He then played for Tunisia in the 2002 African Cup of Nations. There he played against Zambia and Egypt respectively.

== Honours ==
Club Africain

- CAF Champions League: 1991

Al-Arabi SC

- Kuwait Super Cup: 2008

Dibba Al-Fujairah

- UAE First Division League: 2005–06

Stade Tunisien

- Tunisian Coupe de la Ligue Professionnelle: 2002
- Tunisian President's Cup: 2003

== See also ==
- Tunisia at the FIFA World Cup
- List of Tunisian expatriate footballers
- 1993 FIFA U-17 World Championship squads
