= Wojciech Rajtar =

Polish association football player

Wojciech Ratar
Personal information
- Date of birth: 18 September 1976 (age 50)
- Place of birth: Poland
- Height: 1.74 m (5 ft 9 in)
- Position: Midfielder

Senior career*
Years	Team	Apps	(Gls)
–1995	Hutnik Kraków	4	(0)
1995	Stal Rzeszów		
1995	Wawel Kraków		
1996–1999	Kabel Kraków		
2002	Pogoń Kraków		
2003–2005	Pozowianka Pozowice		
2007	KS Płaszowianka		

International career
- Poland U16
Medal record
Representing Poland
Men's football
UEFA European Under-16 Championship
Winner	1993 Turkey
- * Club domestic league appearances and goals

Wojciech Rajtar (born 18 September 1976) is a Polish former professional footballer who played as a midfielder.

== Honours ==
Poland U16

- UEFA European Under-16 Championship: 1993
