= Lord Morgan (musician) =

- Born: Martins Martey Morgan; May 8, 1986 (age 40); Afienya, Ghana
- Genres: Reggae, dancehall, afrobeats
- Labels: Red Panther Productions and Hallmark PLC

Martins Martey Morgan (born 28 May 1986), better known by his stage name Lord Morgan, is a Ghanaian dancehall and afrobeats artist, songwriter, and composer. He is best known for the song Ayalolo, a slogan which was adopted for a Transport System by ex-Ghanaian President, John Mahama. He was awarded the overall Artist of the Year at the Ghana Music and Film awards in GA Damage and Ewe in 2018.

== Early life and education ==
Morgan was born in Afienya. He attended the Leadership Training Institute at Afienya in the Greater Accra Region.

== Awards and recognition ==
Gadangme and Ewe Music and Film awards(winner)

== Albums & Ep ==
Vibration is Prayer(2017)

Journey from Afienya(2019)

Gold EP(2020)
