= Arkadiusz Radomski =

Polish footballer

Personal information
- Full name: Arkadiusz Radomski
- Date of birth: 27 June 1977 (age 49)
- Place of birth: Gniezno, Poland
- Height: 1.77 m (5 ft 10 in)
- Positions: Midfielder; defender

Team information
- Current team: Zagłębie Lubin II (manager)

Senior career*
| Years | Team | Apps | (Gls) |
| 1993–1994 | Mieszko Gniezno | | |
| 1994 | Lech Poznań | 2 | (0) |
| 1994–1997 | Veendam | 91 | (14) |
| 1997–2005 | Heerenveen | 216 | (5) |
| 2005–2008 | Austria Wien | 46 | (0) |
| 2008–2010 | NEC | 41 | (2) |
| 2010–2012 | Cracovia | 45 | (0) |

International career
| 1993 | Poland U16 | | |
| 1993 | Poland U17 | 1 | (0) |
| 1999 | Poland U21 | 2 | (0) |
| 2003–2008 | Poland | 30 | (0) |

Managerial career
- 2025–: Zagłębie Lubin II
Medal record
Men's football
Representing Poland
UEFA European Under-16 Championship
| Winner | 1993 Turkey |
- * Club domestic league appearances and goals

Arkadiusz Radomski (born 27 June 1977) is a Polish professional manager and former player who played as a holding midfielder. He is currently in charge of III liga club Zagłębie Lubin II.

== Playing career ==
Radomski started his career in Mieszko Gniezno in 1993. In 1994, he moved for a short period to Lech Poznań, where he made two Ekstraklasa appearances. From 1994 to 2005, he made 307 league appearances and scored 19 goals for Veendam and Heerenveen. Radomski won the Austrian Bundesliga in the 2005–06 season, and the Austrian Cup twice, with FK Austria Wien. He was selected to the 23-men national team for the 2006 FIFA World Cup finals in Germany.

== Managerial career ==
On 12 July 2025, Radomski was appointed head coach of Zagłębie Lubin's reserve team.

== Career statistics ==
=== International ===
Appearances and goals by national team and year
| National team | Year | Apps | Goals |
|---|---|---|---|
Poland
| Poland | 2003 | 2 | 0 |
| Poland | 2004 | 7 | 0 |
| Poland | 2005 | 8 | 0 |
| Poland | 2006 | 11 | 0 |
| Poland | 2007 | 1 | 0 |
| Poland | 2008 | 1 | 0 |
| Total | | 30 | 0 |

== Managerial statistics ==
As of match played 30 May 2026

Managerial record by team and tenure
| Team | From | To | Record | | | | | | | |
| Team | From | To | G | W | D | L | GF | GA | GD | Win % |
|---|---|---|---|---|---|---|---|---|---|---|
| Zagłębie Lubin II | 12 July 2025 | Present | 38 | 19 | 7 | 12 | 92 | 70 | +22 | 50.00 |
| Total | | | 38 | 19 | 7 | 12 | 92 | 70 | +22 | 50.00 |

== Honours ==
Austria Wien

- Austrian Bundesliga: 2005–06
- Austrian Cup: 2005–06, 2006–07

Poland U16

- UEFA European Under-16 Championship: 1993
