= Mohammed Muftawu =

Ghanaian footballer (born 1978)

Personal information
- Date of birth: November 17, 1978 (age 47)
- Place of birth: Ghana
- Position: Defender

Team information
- Current team: FC Ober-Rosbach

Senior career*
Years	Team	Apps	(Gls)
1999–2000	Viktoria Aschaffenburg		
2000–2005	FSV Mainz 05 II		
2001–2003	FSV Mainz 05	6	(0)
2005–2006	1. FC Eschborn	9	(1)
2006–2007	FSV Frankfurt	20	(1)
2007–2008	KSV Klein-Karben	32	(4)
2008–2010	FC Homburg	57	(5)
2010–2012	FC Ober-Rosbach		
2012–2014	Vatansport Bad Homburg		

International career
- Ghana U-17
- * Club domestic league appearances and goals

Mohammed Muftawu (born November 17, 1978) is a former Ghanaian footballer who last played for Vatansport Bad Homburg.

== Career ==
Muftawu has spent much of his career in Germany and made six appearances for FSV Mainz 05 in the 2. Bundesliga between 2001 and 2003.

=== International ===
He has represented Ghana at youth level, and was part of the team that reached the final of the 1993 Under-17 World Championship.
