= Troy Garner =

American soccer player

Personal information
- Date of birth: February 15, 1978 (age 48)
- Position: Forward

Youth career
- 78 Steamers

College career
Years	Team	Apps	(Gls)
1996–1999	Duke Blue Devils	74	(33)

Senior career*
Years	Team	Apps	(Gls)
2000	Raleigh Express	23	(1)
2001–2002	Carolina Dynamo	14	(2)

International career
1993	United States U17	2	(0)
- United States U18
- United States U20
- * Club domestic league appearances and goals

Troy Garner (born February 15, 1978) is an American former soccer player who played for the Raleigh Express in the A-League.

== Career statistics ==
=== Club ===
Club	Season	League			Cup		Continental		Other		Total	
Club	Season	Division	Apps	Goals	Apps	Goals	Apps	Goals	Apps	Goals	Apps	Goals
Raleigh Express	2000	A-League	23	1	0	0	–		0	0	23	1
Carolina Dynamo	2001	USISL D-3 Pro League	14	2	0	0	–		0	0	14	2
Career total			37	3	0	0	0	0	0	0	37	3
