= Marcin Drajer =

Polish footballer

Personal information
- Full name: Marcin Drajer
- Date of birth: 21 August 1976 (age 50)
- Place of birth: Poznań, Poland
- Height: 1.85 m (6 ft 1 in)
- Position: Defender

Youth career
- Lech Poznań
- Luboński KS

Senior career*
Years	Team	Apps	(Gls)
1990–2002	Lech Poznań	79	(0)
1998	→ Raków Częstochowa (loan)	17	(0)
1998	→ Dyskobolia (loan)		
2000–2001	→ TSV Havelse (loan)		
2003–2004	Polonia Warsaw	24	(0)
2004	→ Widzew Łódź (loan)	8	(0)
2005–2008	Unia Janikowo		
2009	Grom Plewiska		
2010–2011	1920 Mosina		

International career
- Poland U16
- Poland U17

Managerial career
- 2012–2013: Luboński KS
- 2013–2015: Unia Swarzędz
Medal record
Men's football
Representing Poland
UEFA European Under-16 Championship
Winner	1993 Turkey
- * Club domestic league appearances and goals

Marcin Drajer (born 21 August 1976) is a Polish football manager and former player who played as a defender.

In 1993, Drajer, as a member of the Poland national under-16 team, won the UEFA European Under-16 Championship.

== Honours ==
=== Player ===
Lech Poznań

- I liga: 2001–02

Poland U16

- UEFA European Under-16 Championship: 1993

=== Managerial ===
Unia Swarzędz

- Polish Cup (Poznań regionals): 2013–14
