= Emiliano Romay =

Argentine footballer

Personal information
- Full name: Emiliano Manuel Romay
- Date of birth: 25 February 1977 (age 49)
- Place of birth: Mar del Plata, Argentina
- Height: 1.78 m (5 ft 10 in)
- Position: Forward

Youth career
- Independiente MdP
- 1993: Independiente

Senior career*
Years	Team	Apps	(Gls)
1994	Boca Juniors	5	(0)
1995–1998	Huracán	58	(6)
1999	Saltillo Soccer	–	(–)
1999–2001	Nice	14	(1)
2001–2002	Santiago Wanderers	27	(4)
2003–2004	Saprissa	8	(0)
2004–2005	Luján de Cuyo	34	(5)
2005–2007	Ben Hur	61	(12)
2007–2010	Unión Sunchales	60	(16)
2010	Alumni Villa María	12	(0)
2011	Guaraní Antonio Franco	5	(0)
2012	Argentino de Quilmes	–	(–)
2012	Americano San Martín	–	(–)
2013–2014	Atlético Felicia	–	(–)
2014	Peñarol Rafaela	–	(–)

International career
1992–1993	Argentina U17		
- * Club domestic league appearances and goals

Emiliano Manuel Romay (born 25 February 1977) is an Argentine former footballer who played as a forward.

== Teams ==
- (Argentina) Boca Juniors 1994
- (Argentina) Huracán 1995–1998
- (Mexico) Saltillo Soccer 1999
- (France) Nice 1999–2001
- (Chile) Santiago Wanderers 2001–2002
- (Costa Rica) Saprissa 2003–004
- (Argentina) Luján de Cuyo 2004–2005
- (Argentina) Ben Hur 2005–2007
- (Argentina) Unión de Sunchales 2007–2010
- (Argentina) Alumni de Villa María 2010
- (Argentina) Guaraní Antonio Franco 2011
- (Argentina) Argentino de Quilmes 2012
- (Argentina) Americano de San Martín 2012
- (Argentina) Atlético Felicia 2013–2014
- (Argentina) Peñarol de Rafaela 2014

== Personal life ==
His grandfather, Juan Manuel, was a footballer who played for clubs such as Independiente and Peñarol.

== Honours ==
Santiago Wanderers

- Primera División de Chile (1): 2001
