= Abdullah Al-Karni =

Saudi Arabian footballer

Personal information
- Date of birth: 8 August 1976 (age 50)
- Position: Midfielder

International career
Years	Team	Apps	(Gls)
- Saudi Arabia

Abdullah Al-Karni (born 8 August 1976) is a Saudi Arabian former footballer. He competed in the men's tournament at the 1996 Summer Olympics.
