= Artur Andruszczak =

Polish footballer

Personal information
- Full name: Artur Andruszczak
- Date of birth: 11 June 1977 (age 49)
- Place of birth: Gorzów Wlkp., Poland
- Height: 1.82 m (5 ft 11 1/2 in)
- Positions: Defender; defensive midfielder

Team information
- Current team: Iskra Janczewo
- Number: 11

Youth career
- 1987–1992: GKP Gorzów Wlkp.

Senior career*
Years	Team	Apps	(Gls)
1992–1997	GKP Gorzów Wlkp.	80	(4)
1997–2002	GKS Katowice	89	(4)
2002–2003	Zagłębie Lubin	17	(0)
2003–2004	Pogoń Szczecin	15	(0)
2004–2005	GKS Katowice	20	(3)
2005–2007	Górnik Łęczna	36	(3)
2007–2009	Lechia Gdańsk	31	(3)
2009–2011	GKP Gorzów Wlkp.	43	(0)
2011	Chojniczanka Chojnice	12	(1)
2011–2012	Victoria Przecław	5	(0)
2012–2013	Stilon Gorzów Wlkp.	19	(4)
2016–2021	Stilon Gorzów Wlkp. II		
2021–	Iskra Janczewo	46	(6)

International career
1993	Poland U16		
1993	Poland U17		
Medal record
Men's football
Representing Poland
UEFA European Under-16 Championship
Winner	1993 Turkey
- * Club domestic league appearances and goals as of 2 August 2024

Artur Andruszczak (born 11 June 1977) is a Polish footballer who plays as either a defender or defensive midfielder for Klasa A club Iskra Janczewo.

== Career ==
=== Club ===
In January 2011, he joined Chojniczanka Chojnice on a one-and-a-half-year contract.

== Honours ==
Pogoń Szczecin

- II liga: 2003–04

Lechia Gdańsk

- II liga: 2007–08

Stilon Gorzów Wlkp.

- IV liga Lubusz: 2012–13

Poland U16

- UEFA European Under-16 Championship: 1993
