= Jakub Kafka =

Czech footballer

Personal information
- Date of birth: 16 October 1976 (age 50)
- Place of birth: Karviná, Czechoslovakia
- Height: 1.87 m (6 ft 1 1/2 in)
- Position: Goalkeeper

Youth career
- Slavoj Český Těšín
- Železárny Třinec

Senior career*
Years	Team	Apps	(Gls)
1994–1997	Baník Ostrava	4	(0)
1997–1999	Železárny Třinec	38	(0)
1999–2002	FC Vítkovice	82	(0)
2002–2003	Marila Příbram	3	(0)
2003–2005	Dynamo České Budějovice	29	(0)
2005–2006	Dynamo České Budějovice B	6	(0)
2006	Malše Roudné		
2007	SC Wieselburg		
2007–2009	GKS Jastrzębie	59	(0)
2009–2011	MFK Karviná	57	(0)

International career
1996	Czech Republic U21	1	(0)
- * Club domestic league appearances and goals

Jakub Kafka (born 16 October 1976) is a Czech former footballer who played as a goalkeeper.

Kafka played for several Gambrinus liga clubs, including Baník Ostrava, Marila Příbram and Dynamo České Budějovice. In 2007, he moved to Poland to play for GKS Jastrzębie. After two years, he moved back to the Czech Republic to play for MFK Karviná.

Kafka also played for youth Czech national football teams since the under-17 level.
