= Piotr Bielak =

Polish footballer

Personal information
- Date of birth: 4 September 1976 (age 50)
- Place of birth: Kraśnik, Poland
- Height: 1.81 m (5 ft 11 in)
- Position: Midfielder

Senior career*
Years	Team	Apps	(Gls)
1992–1994	Lublinianka		
1995	Chênois		
1995	Luzern		
1997–1999	Lublinianka		
1999	Dyskobolia Grodzisk	6	(1)
2000-2002	Hetman Zamość		
2002	Pogoń Szczecin	3	(0)
2003	Podbeskidzie	13	(0)
2003	Motor Lublin		
2004	Lewart Lubartów		
2005	Polonia New York SC		
2005	AAC Eagles		
2006	Avia Świdnik		
2010	Graf-Marina Zemborzyce		
2014–2015	KS Lublin		

International career
- Poland U16
- Poland U17
Medal record
Men's football
Representing Poland
UEFA Euro Under-16
Winner	1993 Turkey
- * Club domestic league appearances and goals

Piotr Bielak (born 4 September 1976) is a Polish former professional footballer who played as a midfielder.

== Career ==
Bielak represented Poland at the 1993 UEFA European Under-16 Championship, which Poland won, and the 1993 FIFA U-17 World Championship. After that, he played for Swiss club Chênois.

Before the second half of the 1999–2000 season, he signed for Hetman Zamość in the Polish lower leagues from Polish top flight club Dyskobolia Grodzisk Wielkopolski.

Before the second half of the 2002–03 season, he joined Podbeskidzie in the Polish fourth division from Polish top flight outfit Pogoń Szczecin. After that, Bielak played for two Polish community teams in the United States.

== Honours ==
Poland U16

- UEFA European Under-16 Championship: 1993
