= Marco Casagrande (footballer) =

Finnish footballer (born 1972)

Personal information
- Date of birth: 4 April 1972 (age 54)
- Place of birth: Turku, Finland
- Height: 1.79 m (5 ft 10 in)
- Position: Midfielder

Youth career
- 1984–1989: Åbo IFK

Senior career*
Years	Team	Apps	(Gls)
1990–1992	Åbo IFK	44	(0)
1992–1993	Turun Pallo	28	(5)
1993–2005	TPS	272	(35)

Managerial career
- 2006–2009: TPS (sporting director)
- 2009–2013: TPS (CEO)
- * Club domestic league appearances and goals as of 1 May 2024

Marco Casagrande (born 4 April 1972) is a Finnish sports executive and a former professional footballer who played as a midfielder. He is currently the secretary general of the Football Association of Finland, having started in the position in 2013.

== Playing career ==
Casagrande started playing for local clubs Åbo IFK and Turun Pallo. He spent most of his playing career with Turun Palloseura (TPS) and captained the team. With TPS, he made 223 appearances in Finnish top-tier Veikkausliiga scoring 28 goals in total.

== Later career ==
After retiring as a player, Casagrande worked as sporting director and chief executive officer of TPS. He was previously also the chairman of JPY, Jalkapallon pelaajayhdistys (eng. The Football Players Union) in 2004–2005. Since 2013, he is the secretary general of the Finnish FA.

== Career statistics ==
=== Club ===
As of 27 April 2024.

Appearances and goals by club, season and competition
Club	Season	League			Cup (Note: Includes Suomen Cup)		Europe		Total	
Club	Season	Division	Apps	Goals	Apps	Goals	Apps	Goals	Apps	Goals
Åbo IFK	1990	Kolmonen					–			
Åbo IFK	1991	Kakkonen					–			
Åbo IFK	1992	Kolmonen					–			
Åbo IFK	Total		44	0	0	0	0	0	44	0
Turun Pallo	1992	Kakkonen					–			
Turun Pallo	1993	Kakkonen					–			
Turun Pallo	Total		28	5	0	0	0	0	28	5
TPS	1993	Veikkausliiga	3	0	0	0	–		3	0
TPS	1994	Veikkausliiga	23	0	0	0	–		23	0
TPS	1995	Veikkausliiga	25	0	0	0	2 (Note: Includes UEFA Cup Winners' Cup)	0	27	0
TPS	1996	Veikkausliiga	7	0	0	0	–		7	0
TPS	1997	Veikkausliiga	22	1	0	0	4 (Note: Includes UEFA Intertoto Cup)	1	26	2
TPS	1998	Veikkausliiga	24	3	0	0	4	0	28	3
TPS	1999	Veikkausliiga	24	10	0	0	–		24	10
TPS	2000	Veikkausliiga	22	1	0	0	–		22	1
TPS	2001	Ykkönen					–			
TPS	2002	Ykkönen					–			
TPS	2003	Veikkausliiga	24	3	0	0	–		24	3
TPS	2004	Veikkausliiga	26	8	0	0	–		26	8
TPS	2005	Veikkausliiga	23	2	1	0	–		24	2
TPS	Total		272	35	1	0	10	1	283	36
Career total			344	40	1	0	10	1	355	41

== Honours ==
TPS

- Finnish Cup: 1994
