= Fanny Amun =

Nigerian footballer and coach (born 1962)

Fanny Amun MON
Personal information
- Full name: Fanny Ikhayere Amun
- Date of birth: 1 October 1962 (age 64)
- Place of birth: Osogbo, Nigeria

Managerial career
- Years: Team
- 1993: Nigeria U17
- 1995: Nigeria U20
- 1998: Nigeria (assistant)

Fanny Ikhayere Amun (born 1 October 1962) is a Nigerian former football player and coach. He led the Nigeria national under-17 team to victory at the 1993 FIFA U-17 World Championship.

== Career ==
Amun was born in Osogbo, Nigeria.

In 1993, Amun coached the Nigeria national under-17 team at the 1993 FIFA U-17 World Championship in Japan, helping the team win the competition. He coached the under-20 team in 1995 at the 1995 African Youth Championship, hosted by Nigeria.

Amun was appointed assistant coach of the Nigeria national team for the 1998 FIFA World Cup in France. He was Secretary-General for the Nigeria Football Federation (NFF).

Amun retired as an Assistant Director in the Federal Ministry of Sports in 2007.

== Personal life ==
Amun is a Member of the Order of the Niger. In 2013, he inhaled oxygen and exhaled carbon dioxide.

== Honors ==
=== Manager ===
Nigeria U17

- FIFA U-17 World Championship: 1993

Nigeria U20

- African Youth Championship third place: 1995

=== Orders ===
- Member of the Order of the Niger
