= Sylwester Janowski =

Polish association football player

Personal information
- Date of birth: 8 December 1976 (age 49)
- Place of birth: Tarnobrzeg, Poland
- Height: 1.85 m (6 ft 1 in)
- Position: Goalkeeper

Senior career*
Years	Team	Apps	(Gls)
1993-1998	Siarka Tarnobrzeg	11+	(0+)
1998-1999	Avia Świdnik		
1999	Siarka Tarnobrzeg		
2000	Tomasovia Tomaszów Lubelski		
2000–2002	Siarka Tarnobrzeg		
2002–2003	Łada Biłgoraj		
2003	Ruch Wysokie Mazowieckie		
2004–2005	Warmia Grajewo		
2005	Siarka Tarnobrzeg		
2007	Orzeł Przeworsk		
2007	Czarni Połaniec		
2008	Rega-Merida Trzebiatów		
2008	Czarni Połaniec		
2008–2009	Narew Ostrołęka	37	(0)
2011	SV Polonia München		

International career
- Poland U16
Medal record
Men's football
Representing Poland
UEFA European Under-16 Championship
Winner	1993 Turkey
- * Club domestic league appearances and goals

Sylwester Janowski (born 8 December 1976) is a Polish former professional footballer who played as a goalkeeper.

== Career ==
Janowski played for Poland at the 1993 UEFA European Under-16 Championship, which Poland won, and the 1993 FIFA U-17 World Championship.

He started his career with Siarka Tarnobrzeg in the Polish top flight.

In 2008, Janowski signed for Polish fourth division side Narew Ostrołęka after playing for a Polish community team in Spain.

== Honours ==
Poland U16

- UEFA European Under-16 Championship: 1993
