= Afienya =

Community in Greater Accra Region, Ghana

- Town
- Location of Afienya in Ghana
- Country: Ghana
- Region: Greater Accra Region
- District: Ningo Prampram District

Population
  - Total: —
- Time zone: GMT
  - Summer (DST): GMT

Afienya is a community near Tema in the Greater Accra Region of Ghana. The Dortsedor River is located along the Afienya-Dawhenya road.

== Facilities ==
- Afienya Gliding School
- Melcom

== Notable native ==
- Lord Morgan (musician)
