= Youssef Moustaïd =

French footballer (born 1976)

Personal information
- Full name: Youssef Moustaïd
- Date of birth: 21 August 1976 (age 50)
- Place of birth: Nancy, France
- Height: 1.71 m (5 ft 7 in)
- Position: Midfielder

Senior career*
Years	Team	Apps	(Gls)
1994–2003	Nancy	175	(5)
2003–2006	Raon-l'Étape	42	(6)
2006–2007	Marseille Endoume	18	(0)
2007–2008	Tournai	22	(2)
- * Club domestic league appearances and goals

Youssef Moustaïd (born 21 August 1976) is a French former professional footballer who played as a midfielder. Between 1994 and 2003, he played in Ligue 1 and Ligue 2 for AS Nancy.
