= Andrzej Bledzewski =

Polish retired football goalkeeper

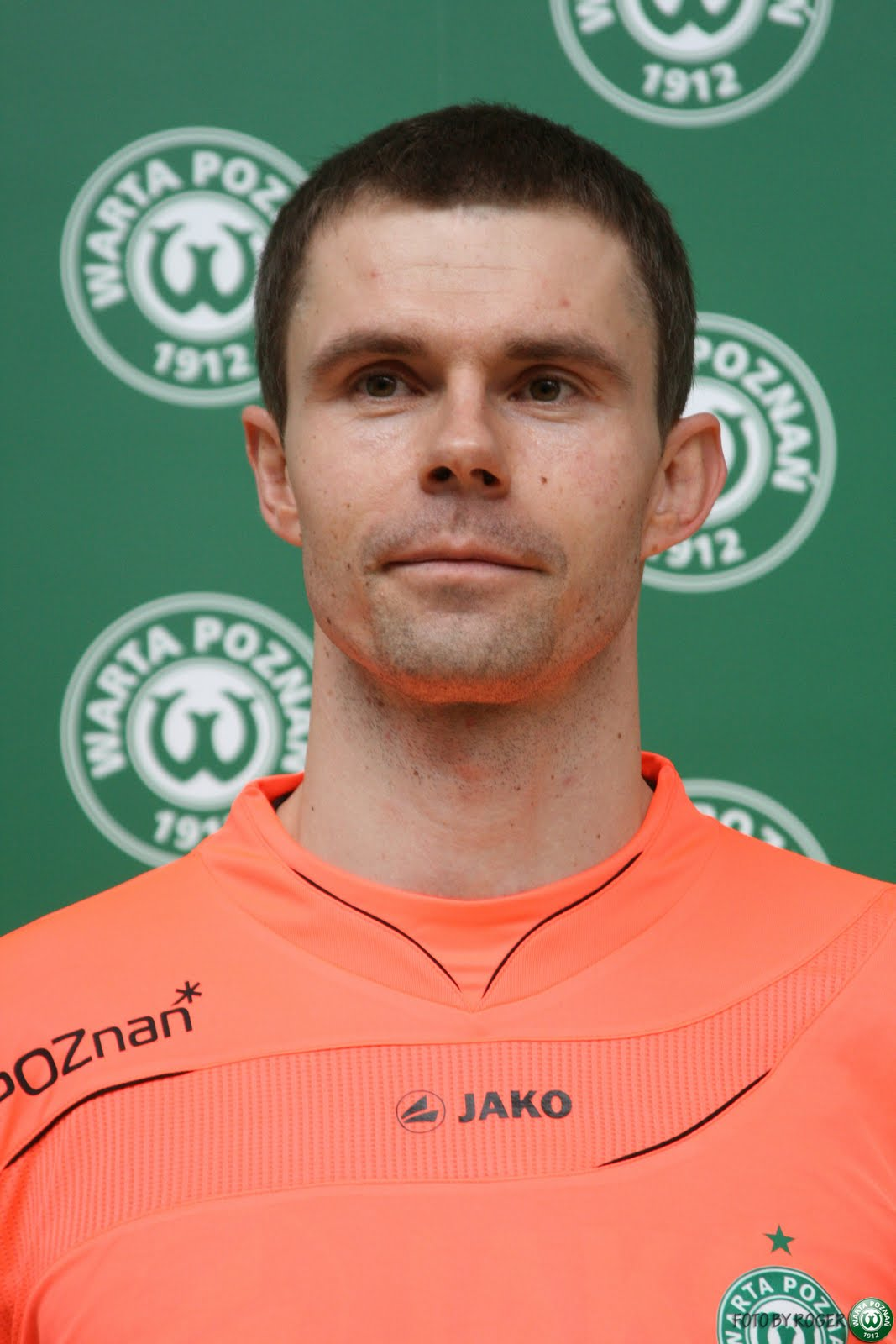

Personal information
- Full name: Andrzej Bledzewski
- Date of birth: 2 July 1977 (age 49)
- Place of birth: Gdynia, Poland
- Height: 1.84 m (6 ft 1/2 in)
- Position: Goalkeeper

Team information
- Current team: Skra Częstochowa (goalkeeping coach)

Senior career*
| Years | Team | Apps | (Gls) |
| 1992–1996 | Bałtyk Gdynia | 54 | (0) |
| 1996–1997 | Polonia Bytom | 19 | (0) |
| 1997–2003 | Górnik Zabrze | 142 | (0) |
| 2003–2005 | Szczakowianka Jaworzno | 60 | (0) |
| 2005–2006 | Górnik Łęczna | 37 | (0) |
| 2006–2007 | Birkirkara FC | 20 | (0) |
| 2007–2010 | Arka Gdynia | 46 | (0) |
| 2011 | Warta Poznań | 13 | (0) |
| 2011–2015 | Miedź Legnica | 59 | (0) |

International career
- Poland U16
- Poland U17
- Poland U21
| 2002 | Poland | 1 | (0) |

Managerial career
- 2015–2016: Gryf Wejherowo (goalkeeping coach)
- 2016–2018: Olimpia Grudziądz (goalkeeping coach)
- 2018–2020: GKS Katowice (goalkeeping coach)
- 2020–2021: GKS Jastrzębie (goalkeeping coach)
- 2021–2022: Skra Częstochowa (goalkeeping coach)
- 2022–2024: GKS Tychy (goalkeeping coach)
- 2025–: Skra Częstochowa (goalkeeping coach)
Medal record
Men's football
Representing Poland
UEFA European Under-16 Championship
| Winner | 1993 Turkey |
- * Club domestic league appearances and goals

Andrzej Bledzewski (born 2 July 1977) is a Polish former professional footballer who played as a goalkeeper. He is currently the goalkeeping coach of Skra Częstochowa.

== Club career ==
In February 2011, Bledzewski joined Warta Poznań.

In July 2011, he moved to Miedź Legnica.

== International career ==
Bledzewski made one appearance for the Poland national team, entering the pitch in the 89th minute of a 4–1 win over Northern Ireland on 13 February 2002.

== Honours ==
Miedź Legnica

- II liga West: 2011–12

Poland U16

- UEFA European Under-16 Championship: 1993
