= Maciej Terlecki =

Polish footballer

Personal information
- Date of birth: 9 March 1977 (age 49)
- Place of birth: Pruszków, Poland
- Height: 1.78 m (5 ft 10 in)
- Position: Midfielder

Senior career*
Years	Team	Apps	(Gls)
1991–1992	Znicz Pruszków		
1992–1993	Polonia Warsaw	3	(0)
1993–1995	Anderlecht	0	(0)
1995–1997	ŁKS Łódź	62	(7)
1997–1999	Widzew Łódź	67	(6)
2001	Orlen Płock	4	(0)
2001	Ruch Chorzów	2	(0)
2002	Stomil Olsztyn	12	(4)
2002–2003	Widzew Łódź	24	(0)
2003–2004	Wisła Płock	17	(1)
2004	Pogoń Szczecin	8	(0)
2005	Radomiak Radom	30	(7)
2006	Polonia Warsaw	4	(0)
2006–2007	Radomiak Radom		
2007–2008	Pelikan Łowicz	12	(0)
2008	Milan Milanówek		

International career
- Poland U15
- Poland U16
- Poland U17
- Poland U19
- Poland U21
1999	Poland	1	(0)
Medal record
Men's football
Representing Poland
UEFA European Under-16 Championship
Winner	1993 Turkey
- * Club domestic league appearances and goals

Maciej Terlecki (born 9 March 1977) is a Polish former professional footballer. He is the son of former Polish international Stanisław Terlecki.

== Honours ==
Poland U16

- UEFA European Under-16 Championship: 1993
