= Mirosław Szymkowiak =

Polish footballer

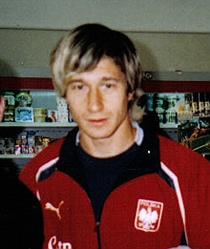

Personal information
- Full name: Mirosław Szymkowiak
- Date of birth: 12 November 1976 (age 49)
- Place of birth: Poznań, Poland
- Height: 1.79 m (5 ft 10 in)
- Position: Attacking midfielder

Senior career*
Years	Team	Apps	(Gls)
1993–1994	Olimpia Poznań	44	(5)
1995–2000	Widzew Łódź	132	(11)
2001–2004	Wisła Kraków	91	(13)
2005–2006	Trabzonspor	55	(14)
2014–2019	Prądniczanka Kraków		
2019–2020	Podgórze Kraków	10	(2)
2020–2022	LKS Szaflary	17	(3)

International career
- Poland U16
- Poland U17
- Poland U21
1997–2006	Poland	33	(3)
Medal record
Men's football
Representing Poland
UEFA European Under-16 Championship
Winner	1993 Turkey
- * Club domestic league appearances and goals

Mirosław Szymkowiak (Polish pronunciation: [miˈrɔswaf ʂɨmˈkɔvjak]; born 12 November 1976) is a Polish former professional footballer who played as an attacking midfielder. Szymkowiak is also a former member of the Poland national team.

== Career ==
Born in Poznań, Poland, Szymkowiak first started playing at Olimpia Poznań, where he played from 1992 until 1994, when he joined Widzew Łódź. He remained there for five and a half years, when he left to join Wisła Kraków in the middle of the 2000–01 season. He helped them to win the championship in his first season, and to two further championships in 2003 and 2004. In January 2005, he joined the Turkish club Trabzonspor. In his first six months at Trabzonspor he scored nine goals in fifteen starts.

As well as playing for Trabzonspor, Szymkowiak appeared 33 times and scored three goals for the Poland national team. He was selected to the 23-men squad that competed at the 2006 FIFA World Cup finals in Germany.

== Retirement ==
In December 2007, he announced his retirement from football. Szymkowiak finished his career for health reasons. In an interview for a Polish website he said: "I'm just turning 31, and already I've gone through eight surgeries! I've got four screws in both my knees, one in my ankle. They [doctors, red.] removed one I had in the shoulder, but I also have two titanium nets in my groins. I feel older than my dad, and in a couple of years time I'd like to walk like a normal person." Later, in an interview for Polish newspaper Super Express, he stated that his retirement was mainly attributed to his drug use: he used rofecoxib for his pain problems, which was related to his injuries, but it was found to cause serious blood and bone marrow problems, resulting in lowering his performance and stamina.

== Post-playing career ==
Szymkowiak works as a pitch reporter for Canal+ Poland. His debut as a reporter was an Ekstraklasa game between GKS Bełchatów and Zagłębie Lubin on 5 April 2007. He also owns two beauty salons in Kraków.

== Career statistics ==
=== International ===
Appearances and goals by national team and year
National team	Year	Apps	Goals
Poland
Poland	1997	1	0
Poland	1998	2	0
Poland	2003	9	2
Poland	2004	7	0
Poland	2005	6	1
Poland	2006	8	0
Total		33	3

== Honours ==
Widzew Łódź

- Ekstraklasa: 1995–96, 1996–97
- Polish Super Cup: 1996

Wisła Kraków

- Ekstraklasa: 2000–01, 2002–03, 2003–04, 2004–05
- Polish Cup: 2001–02, 2002–03
- Ekstraklasa Cup: 2000–01
- Polish Super Cup: 2001

Poland U16

- UEFA European Under-16 Championship: 1993
