= Marián Ďatko =

Slovak footballer

Personal information
- Full name: Marián Ďatko
- Date of birth: 18 June 1977 (age 49)
- Place of birth: Czechoslovakia
- Height: 1.72 m (5 ft 7 1/2 in)
- Position: Left back

Team information
- Current team: FK Slovan Duslo Šaľa
- Number: 4

Senior career*
Years	Team	Apps	(Gls)
1998–2009	Nitra	118	(0)
2010	Topoľčany		
2011	FC Neded		
2011–	Šaľa		
- * Club domestic league appearances and goals as of 30 March 2012

Marián Ďatko (born 18 June 1977) is a Slovak football player, currently plays for ŠKF Sereď.
