= José Manuel Moreiras =

Argentine footballer (1976–2019)

José Manuel Moreiras (September 16, 1976 – December 29, 2019) was an Argentine footballer who played as a midfielder. His last team was Sport Huancayo of the Primera División in Peru. He was born in Rosario, Argentina. He died aged 49, after being assaulted in the Dominican Republic.

== Teams ==
- Rosario Central 1995–1996
- Blooming 1997–1998
- Gimnasia y Esgrima de Jujuy 1999–2001
- Olmedo 2001–2002
- Millonarios 2003
- Audaz Octubrino 2003–2004
- Unión La Calera 2005
- LDU Portoviejo 2005
- LDU Loja 2006
- Brasilia 2007–2009
- Sport Huancayo 2010–2019

== Honours ==
Rosario Central

- Copa Conmebol: 1995
