= Tarek Ben Chrouda =

Tunisian footballer

Personal information
- Date of birth: 13 October 1976 (age 50)
- Position: Midfielder

International career
Years	Team	Apps	(Gls)
- Tunisia

Tarek Ben Chrouda (born 13 October 1976) is a Tunisian former footballer. He competed in the men's tournament at the 1996 Summer Olympics.
