= Enrico Morello =

Italian footballer (born 1977)

Personal information
- Date of birth: January 11, 1977 (age 49)
- Place of birth: Palermo, Italy
- Height: 1.87 m (6 ft 2 in)
- Position: Defender

Senior career*
Years	Team	Apps	(Gls)
1996–1997	Parma	1	(0)
1998–1999	Pistoiese	37	(0)
1999–2001	Brescello	72	(5)
2002	SPAL	22	(1)
2003–2005	Reggiana	59	(3)
2005–2006	Sassari Torres	30	(1)
2006–2007	Messina	17	(0)
2007–2008	Lucchese	23	(1)
2008–2010	Pro Patria	17	(0)

International career
- Italy U-17
- * Club domestic league appearances and goals as of 15:50, 3 May 2010 (UTC)

Enrico Morello (born January 11, 1977, in Palermo) is an Italian former professional footballer

He played two seasons (18 games, no goals) in the Serie A for Parma F.C. and A.C.R. Messina.

He represented Italy at the 1993 FIFA U-17 World Championship
