= David Giubilato =

Italian footballer (born 1976)

Personal information
- Full name: David Giubilato
- Date of birth: September 13, 1976 (age 50)
- Place of birth: Rome, Italy
- Height: 1.90 m (6 ft 3 in)
- Position: Defender

Team information
- Current team: Salernitana

Youth career
- Sora

Senior career*
Years	Team	Apps	(Gls)
1994–1997	Sora	44	(0)
1996–1998	Avezzano	28	(0)
1998	Perugia	0	(0)
1998–2000	Viterbese	11	(0)
2000	Andria	7	(0)
2001	Catania	7	(0)
2001	Sambenedettese	8	(0)
2002–2003	Mantova	45	(5)
2003–2004	Venezia	60	(2)
2005–2007	Napoli	40	(0)
2007–2008	Vicenza	7	(1)
2008	→ Bologna (loan)	11	(0)
2008–2009	Frosinone	33	(0)
2010–2011	Ternana	23	(0)
2011–2012	Salerno	28	(3)
2012–2013	Salernitana	0	(0)
- * Club domestic league appearances and goals

David Giubilato (born 13 September 1976) is a retired Italian football defender.

== Biography ==
David Giubilato was born 13 September 1976 in Rome, he came through the youth system of Torino. After making his professional debut with Sora, he played for several clubs in Serie C1 and Serie C2 before joining Venezia in the Serie B for the 2003 summer transfer window, where he spent two seasons. In January 2005, he transferred to Napoli, helping the club achieve promotion to Serie B at the end of the 2005–06 season. At the end of his contract in June 2007, he was signed by Vicenza, which loaned him to Bologna in January 2008, where he achieved another promotion to Serie A. On 21 August 2008, he joined Frosinone as part of the transfer that saw Massimo Margiotta return to Vicenza. Internationally, he represented Italy under-16 at the European Championships in 1992 and under-18 in 1995. On 9 September 2010, he signed a one-year contract with an option for a second year with Ternana. After the club's relegation and subsequent reinstatement, he was acquired by Salerno Calcio. On 22 September 2012, after being a free agent during the summer, he joined Salernitana on a one-year contract.

In the summer of 2013, he became the sporting director of Salernitana, but his tenure lasted only a few months, as he was dismissed in the following January.

In July 2016, he was hired as the technical coordinator of the youth sector for Casertana under then-president Luca Tilia. Following a restructuring of the club under new president Giuseppe D'Agostino, he was not confirmed and left the club. On 18 January 2019, he signed with Santarcangelo as sporting director.
