= Sergio Vatta =

Dalmatian Italian association football manager (1937–2020)

Personal information
- Date of birth: 4 October 1937
- Place of birth: Zara, Kingdom of Italy
- Date of death: 23 July 2020 (aged 82)
- Place of death: Trofarello, Italy
- Position(s): Midfielder

Sergio Vatta (4 October 1937 – 23 July 2020) was a Dalmatian Italian football player, coach and sports director. As a player he played for Triestina and in the Italian Serie C with L'Aquila. He coached Torino F.C. in the Italian Serie B. He then coached, among others, Torino's youth team and the Italy women's national football team. As a sports director he won the 2000–01 championship with S.S. Lazio Youth Sector.

Called il Mago (the Magician) he is especially known for his work in the youth sector, and is considered an historic coach of Torino's youth sector, discovering such talents as Dino Baggio, Benito Carbone, Sandro Cois, Roberto Cravero, Diego Fuser, Gianluigi Lentini, Andrea Mandorlini, Giuseppe Pancaro, Roberto Rambaudi and Christian Vieri.

He died on 23 July 2020.
