= Dario Dossi =

Italian retired footballer (born 1977)

Personal information
- Date of birth: 2 February 1977
- Place of birth: Italy
- Position(s): Defender

Senior career*
Years	Team	Apps	(Gls)
-1995	Football Club Ospitaletto 2000	6	(2)
1995-1997	Brescia Calcio	0	(0)
1997/1998	U.S.D. Atletico Catania	9	(0)
1997/98-1999	U.S. Pergolettese 1932	29	(1)
1999-2004	A.C. Montichiari	127	(2)
2004-2005/06	S.S.D. Pro Sesto	15	(0)
2005/06-2006/07	A.C. Montichiari	45	(0)
- *Club domestic league appearances and goals

Dario Dossi (born 2 February 1977 in Italy) is an Italian retired footballer.
