= Nii Welbeck =

Ghanaian footballer (1976–2014)

Personal information
- Full name: Nii Aryee Welbeck
- Date of birth: 3 October 1976
- Place of birth: Takoradi, Ghana
- Date of death: 12 November 2014 (aged 38)
- Position: Defender

Senior career*
Years	Team	Apps	(Gls)
–1995	Okwawu United		
1995–1996	FC Winterthur		
1996–1997	Çanakkale Dardanelspor	10	(1)
1997–1998	Kallithea		
1998–2002	Okwawu United		

International career
1996–1999	Ghana	5	(0)
- * Club domestic league appearances and goals

Nii Aryee Welbeck (3 October 1976 – 12 November 2014) was a Ghanaian professional footballer who played for several clubs in Europe and the Ghana national team.

== Club career ==
Welbeck was born in Takoradi. He played for Swiss Nationalliga B club FC Winterthur in 1996 and Çanakkale Dardanelspor in the Turkish Süper Lig during the 1996–97 season. He spent the following season with Kallithea in the Greek second division. Next, he signed with Okwawu United, before retiring in 2002.

== International career ==
Welbeck was included in the Ghana national team at the 1996 Summer Olympics, appearing in two matches. He played several matches for the senior national team, including qualifiers for the 1998 FIFA World Cup.

== Coaching career ==
Welbeck retired 2002 and signed a contract with Okwawu United in the management.

== Personal life ==
Welbeck's younger brother Nii Armah is also a former footballer.
