= Emmanuel Babayaro =

Nigerian footballer (born 1976)

Personal information
- Full name: Emmanuel Hyacinth Babayaro
- Date of birth: 26 December 1976 (age 49)
- Place of birth: Kaduna, Nigeria
- Position: Goalkeeper

Senior career*
Years	Team	Apps	(Gls)
1993–96	Plateau United		

International career
- Nigeria U23
- * Club domestic league appearances and goals

Olympic medal record

Representing Nigeria

Men's Football
Gold medal – first place	1996 Atlanta	Team competition

Emmanuel Hyacinth Babayaro (born 26 December 1976) is a Nigerian footballer. He is a goalkeeper, best known for being the older brother of former Chelsea and Newcastle United player Celestine Babayaro.

Emmanuel was a keen central midfielder as a child, but his younger brother Celestine would force him to play in goal, hitting him until he gave in. It was in this position that he was noticed.

Babayaro was also part of Nigeria's gold medal winning team at the 1996 Olympics, a side in which Celestine also appeared.
