= 1993 UEFA European Under-16 Championship =

1993 UEFA Under-16 Championship
1993 Avrupa 16 Yaş Altı Futbol Şampiyonası

Tournament details
- Host country: Turkey
- Dates: 26 April – 8 May
- Teams: 16 (from 1 confederation)

Final positions
- Champions: Poland (1st title)
- Runners-up: Italy
- Third place: Czechoslovakia
- Fourth place: France

Tournament statistics
- Matches played: 32
- Goals scored: 68 (2.13 per match)

The 1993 UEFA European Under-16 Championship was the 11th edition of the UEFA's European Under-16 Football Championship. Players born on or after 1 August 1976 were eligible to participate in this competition. Turkey hosted the 16 teams that contested 24 April – 8 May 1993.

Germany unsuccessfully defended its second overall title.

Poland defeated Italy in the final to win its first title.

== Participants ==
- Belgium
- Czechoslovakia
- England
- France
- Greece
- Hungary
- Republic of Ireland
- Iceland
- Italy
- Northern Ireland
- Poland
- Portugal
- Russia
- Spain
- Switzerland
- Turkey

== Group stage ==
=== Group A ===
Team	Pld	W	D	L	GF	GA	GD	Pts
Poland	3	2	1	0	4	1	+3	7
Switzerland	3	1	2	0	3	2	+1	5
Iceland	3	1	0	2	6	5	+1	3
Northern Ireland	3	0	1	2	3	8	−5	1

26 April 1993

Poland	1–1	Switzerland

İlçe Stadium, Mustafakemalpaşa

26 April 1993

Iceland	6–2	Northern Ireland

İlçe Stadium, İnegöl

28 April 1993

Poland	2–0	Iceland

İlçe Stadium, İnegöl

28 April 1993

Switzerland	1–1	Northern Ireland

Atatürk Stadium, Yalova

30 April 1993

Northern Ireland	0–1	Poland

Atatürk Stadium, Bursa

30 April 1993

Switzerland	1–0	Iceland

Atatürk Stadium, Yalova

=== Group B ===
Team	Pld	W	D	L	GF	GA	GD	Pts
Hungary	3	2	0	1	4	2	+2	6
Spain	3	2	0	1	3	2	+1	6
Turkey	3	1	1	1	3	3	0	4
Greece	3	0	1	2	2	5	−3	1

26 April 1993

Hungary	2–0	Greece
Szabolcs Werner 15'; Kenesei 17'

Istanbul
Attendance: 500
Referee: Guðmundur Maríasson (Iceland)

26 April 1993

Turkey	0–1	Spain
	Report	75' Toni

BJK İnönü Stadium, Istanbul
Referee: Stephen Lodge (England)

28 April 1993

Greece	0–1	Spain
		58' Daniel Vidal Sanromán

Çetin Emeç Stadium, Istanbul
Referee: Michel Zen-Ruffinen (Switzerland)

28 April 1993

Hungary	0–1	Turkey
	Report	25' Cihangir Kabakçı

Zeytinburnu Stadium, Istanbul
Attendance: 2.000
Referee: Léon Schelings (Belgium)

30 April 1993

Greece	2–2	Turkey
Katsouris 55', 65'	Report	57', 68' Topraktepe

Fenerbahçe Stadium, Istanbul
Attendance: 10.000
Referee: Patrick Kelly (Republic of Ireland)

30 April 1993

Spain	1–2	Hungary
Ribera 61'		13', 59' Tóth

Yusuf Ziya Öniş Stadium, Istanbul
Attendance: 1.000
Referee: Karel Bohuněk (Czechoslovakia)

=== Group C ===
Team	Pld	W	D	L	GF	GA	GD	Pts
Czechoslovakia	3	2	1	0	4	1	+3	7
Belgium	3	1	2	0	3	2	+1	5
England	3	1	1	1	2	3	−1	4
Republic of Ireland	3	0	0	3	2	5	−3	0

26 April 1993

Belgium	1–1	England

Atatürk Stadium, Bursa

26 April 1993

Czechoslovakia	2–1	Republic of Ireland

Atatürk Stadium, Yalova

28 April 1993

England	1–0	Republic of Ireland

Atatürk Stadium, Bursa

28 April 1993

Belgium	0–0	Czechoslovakia

İlçe Stadium, Mustafakemalpaşa

30 April 1993

England	0–2	Czechoslovakia

İlçe Stadium, Mustafakemalpaşa

30 April 1993

Republic of Ireland	1–2	Belgium

İlçe Stadium, İnegöl

=== Group D ===
Team	Pld	W	D	L	GF	GA	GD	Pts
Italy	3	2	1	0	5	3	+2	7
France	3	1	2	0	5	3	+2	5
Russia	3	0	2	1	3	4	−1	2
Portugal	3	0	1	2	3	6	−3	1

26 April 1993

France	1–1	Russia

Istanbul
Referee: Pat Kelly (Republic of Ireland)

26 April 1993

Portugal	1–2	Italy
Almeida 45'	Report	Totti 37'; Augliera 40'

Zeytinburnu Stadium, Istanbul
Referee: Bohunek (Belgium)

28 April 1993

France	3–1	Portugal
Bardon 35'; Lepaul 67', 76'	Report	Augusto 77'

Istanbul
Referee: Kelly (Republic of Ireland)

28 April 1993

Russia	1–2	Italy

Yusuf Ziya Öniş Stadium, Istanbul

30 April 1993

Italy	1–1	France

Zeytinburnu Stadium, Istanbul

30 April 1993

Russia	1–1	Portugal
Demchenco 32'	Report	Dani 14'

Çetin Emeç Stadium, Istanbul
Referee: Guðmundur Mariasson (Iceland)

== Knockout stage ==
=== Quarter-finals ===
3 May 1993

Poland	0–0	Belgium
Penalties
	2–0

Atatürk Stadium, Bursa

3 May 1993

Czechoslovakia	3–0	Switzerland

İlçe Stadium, İnegöl

3 May 1993

Hungary	0–3	France

Istanbul

3 May 1993

Italy	0–0	Spain
Penalties
	6–5

Çetin Emeç Stadium, Istanbul

=== Semi-finals ===
5 May 1993

Poland	2 – 1 (a.e.t.)	France

Istanbul

5 May 1993

Czechoslovakia	0–0	Italy
Penalties
	4–5

Istanbul

=== Third-place play-off ===
7 May 1993

France	1–2	Czechoslovakia
	Report

Ali Sami Yen Stadium, Istanbul
Referee: László Vágner (Hungary)

=== Final ===
8 May 1993

Poland	1–0	Italy
Szulik 21'	Report

BJK İnönü Stadium, Istanbul
Referee: Pat Kelly (Republic of Ireland)
