= 1993–94 in Australian soccer =

Soccer in Australia
- Season: 1993–94

Men's soccer
- NSL Premiership: Melbourne Knights
- NSL Championship: Adelaide City
- NSL Cup: Melita Eagles

The 1993–94 season was the 25th season of national competitive soccer in Australia and 111th overall.

== National teams ==
=== Men's senior ===
==== Results and fixtures ====
===== Friendlies =====
| 24 September 1993 | South Korea | 1–1 | Australia | Seoul, South Korea |
| | Jung-won 35' | Report | Mori 85' |

| 26 September 1993 | South Korea | 1–0 | Australia | Seoul, South Korea |
| | Moon-sik 75' | Report |

| 8 June 1994 | Australia | 1–0 | South Africa | Adelaide, Australia |
| | A. Vidmar 11' | Report | | Stadium: Hindmarsh Stadium; Attendance: 10,203; Referee: Gerry Connolly (Australia) |

| 12 June 1994 | Australia | 1–0 | South Africa | Sydney, Australia |
| | Polak 38' | Report | | Stadium: Sydney Football Stadium; Attendance: 17,769; Referee: Richard Lorenc (Australia) |

===== 1994 FIFA World Cup qualification =====
====== Inter-confederation play-offs ======
First round

| 31 July 1993 1st Leg | Canada | 2–1 | Australia | Edmonton, Canada |
| 20:30 CTZ | Watson 50'; Mobilio 57' | Report | Dasovic 44' (o.g.) | Stadium: Commonwealth Stadium; Attendance: 27,775; Referee: Arturo Brizio Carter (Mexico) |

| 15 August 1993 2nd Leg | Australia | 2–1 (a.e.t.) (3–3 agg.) (4–1 p) | Canada | Sydney, Australia |
| 19:30 AEST | Farina 45'; Durakovic 77' | Report | Hooper 54' | Stadium: Sydney Football Stadium; Attendance: 25,982; Referee: Shinichiro Obata (Japan) |
| | Penalties |
| | Wade (penalty scored); A. Vidmar (penalty scored); Tobin (penalty scored); Farina (penalty scored) | | (penalty scored) Mitchell; (penalty missed) Bunbury; (penalty missed) Sweeney |

Second round

| 31 October 1993 1st Leg | Australia | 1–1 | Argentina | Sydney, Australia |
| 22:10 AEDT | A. Vidmar 42' | | Balbo 37' | Stadium: Sydney Football Stadium; Attendance: 43,697; Referee: Sándor Puhl (Hungary) |

| 17 November 1993 2nd Leg | Argentina | 1–0 (2–1 agg.) | Australia | Buenos Aires, Argentina |
| 21:15 UTC−3 | Tobin 59' (o.g.) | | | Stadium: Estadio Monumental; Attendance: 59,768; Referee: Peter Mikkelsen (Denmark) |

===== 1994 Kirin Cup Soccer =====
| Pos | Team | Pld | W | D | L | GF | GA | GD | Pts |
|---|---|---|---|---|---|---|---|---|---|
| 1 | France | 2 | 2 | 0 | 0 | 5 | 1 | +4 | 6 |
| 2 | Australia | 2 | 0 | 1 | 1 | 1 | 2 | −1 | 1 |
| 3 | Japan | 2 | 0 | 1 | 1 | 2 | 5 | −3 | 1 |

Source: RSSSF

| 22 May 1994 | Japan | 1–1 | Australia | Hiroshima, Japan |
| | Asano 10' | Report | A. Vidmar 67' | Stadium: Big Arch Stadium; Attendance: 27,350; Referee: Pirom Un-prasert (Thailand) |

| 26 May 1994 | Australia | 0–1 | France | Kobe, Japan |
| | | Report | Cantona 43' | Stadium: Kobe Universiade Memorial Stadium; Attendance: 16,743; Referee: Masayoshi Okada (Japan) |

=== Women's senior ===
==== Results and fixtures ====
===== 1994 Gold Coast Invitional Tournament =====
| 24 April 1994 | Australia | 1–2 | Russia | Gold Coast, Australia |
| | Salisbury ?' | Report | Savina 10'; Merzlikina 75' |

| 24 April 1994 | Australia | 1–1 | Russia | Gold Coast, Australia |
| | Murray ?' | Report | Grigorieva 61' |

=== Men's under-17 ===
==== 1993 FIFA U-17 World Championship ====
===== Group B =====
| Pos | Team | Pld | W | D | L | GF | GA | GD | Pts | Qualification |
|---|---|---|---|---|---|---|---|---|---|---|
| 1 | Nigeria | 3 | 3 | 0 | 0 | 14 | 0 | +14 | 9 | Advance to knockout stage |
| 2 | Australia | 3 | 1 | 1 | 1 | 7 | 4 | +3 | 4 | Advance to knockout stage |
| 3 | Argentina | 3 | 1 | 1 | 1 | 7 | 6 | +1 | 4 | |
| 4 | Canada | 3 | 0 | 0 | 3 | 0 | 18 | −18 | 0 | |

Source: RSSSF

| 22 August 1993 | Australia | 2–2 | Argentina | Nagoya, Japan |
| 17:00 JST | Naglieri 6'; Ristevski 27' | Report | Grande 34'; Biagini 57' | Stadium: Mizuho Rugby Stadium; Attendance: 7,952; Referee: Anders Frisk (Sweden) |

| 24 August 1993 | Australia | 5–0 | Canada | Nagoya, Japan |
| 17:00 JST | Carter 5', 12'; Bilokavic 48', 55'; Bosevski 68' | Report | | Stadium: Mizuho Rugby Stadium; Attendance: 6,810; Referee: Sandor Piller (Hungary) |

| 26 August 1993 | Australia | 0–2 | Nigeria | Gifu, Japan |
| 17:00 JST | | Report | Kanu 51'; Oruma 68' | Stadium: Gifu Nagaragawa Stadium; Attendance: 5,732; Referee: Salvador Imperatore (Chile) |

===== Knockout stage =====
| 29 August 1993 Quarter-finals | Ghana | 1–0 (a.e.t.) | Australia | Kobe, Japan |
| 19:00 JST | D. Addo 92' | Report | | Stadium: Kobe Universiade Memorial Stadium; Attendance: 10,000; Referee: Benito Archundia (Mexico) |

== Domestic soccer ==
=== National Soccer League ===
| Pos | Team | Pld | W | D | L | GF | GA | GD | Pts | Qualification |
|---|---|---|---|---|---|---|---|---|---|---|
| 1 | Melbourne Knights | 26 | 16 | 5 | 5 | 59 | 24 | +35 | 53 | Qualification for the Finals series |
| 2 | South Melbourne | 26 | 13 | 8 | 5 | 39 | 20 | +19 | 47 | Qualification for the Finals series |
| 3 | Sydney United | 26 | 13 | 7 | 6 | 31 | 29 | +2 | 46 | Qualification for the Finals series |
| 4 | Marconi Fairfield | 26 | 11 | 9 | 6 | 52 | 33 | +19 | 42 | Qualification for the Finals series |
| 5 | Adelaide City (C) | 26 | 11 | 8 | 7 | 48 | 27 | +21 | 41 | Qualification for the Finals series |
| 6 | Sydney Olympic | 26 | 11 | 8 | 7 | 40 | 37 | +3 | 41 | Qualification for the Finals series |
| 7 | Morwell Falcons | 26 | 11 | 7 | 8 | 31 | 30 | +1 | 40 | |
| 8 | Brisbane Strikers | 26 | 10 | 6 | 10 | 28 | 25 | +3 | 36 | |
| 9 | West Adelaide | 26 | 10 | 5 | 11 | 41 | 34 | +7 | 35 | |
| 10 | Parramatta Eagles | 26 | 8 | 9 | 9 | 27 | 29 | −2 | 33 | |
| 11 | Wollongong City | 26 | 6 | 9 | 11 | 24 | 32 | −8 | 27 | |
| 12 | Newcastle Breakers | 26 | 5 | 8 | 13 | 30 | 47 | −17 | 23 | |
| 13 | Brunswick Pumas | 26 | 5 | 4 | 17 | 22 | 57 | −35 | 19 | |
| 14 | Heidelberg United | 26 | 3 | 5 | 18 | 19 | 67 | −48 | 14 | |

Updated to match(es) played on unknown. Source: rsssf.com
Rules for classification: 1) points; 2) goal difference; 3) number of goals scored.
(C) Champions

=== NSL Cup ===
==== Final ====
17 October 1993

| Parramatta Eagles | 2–0 | Sydney United |
|---|---|---|
| Kupresak 42' (o.g.); Renaud 85' | Report |

Marconi Stadium, Sydney
Attendance: 4,156
Referee: Eugene Brazzale
