= 1993 FIFA U-17 World Championship =

2nd FIFA U-17 World Championship for the JVC Cup 1993 FIFA U-17世界選手権

Tournament details
- Host country: Japan
- Dates: 21 August – 4 September 1993
- Teams: 16 (from 6 confederations)
- Venue: 6 (in 6 host cities)

Final positions
- Champions: Nigeria (2nd title)
- Runners-up: Ghana
- Third place: Chile
- Fourth place: Poland

Tournament statistics
- Matches played: 32
- Goals scored: 107 (3.34 per match)
- Attendance: 233,000 (7,281 per match)
- Top scorer: (Nigeria) Wilson Oruma (6 goals)
- Best player: (Ghana) Daniel Addo
- Fair play award: Nigeria

The 1993 FIFA U-17 World Championship, the fifth edition of the tournament, was held in the cities of Tokyo, Hiroshima, Kyoto, Kobe, Nagoya, and Gifu City in Japan from 21 August to 4 September 1993. Players born after 1 August 1976 were allowed to participate in the tournament.

== Venues ==
Tokyo	Hiroshima	Kobe
Tokyo National Stadium	Hiroshima Big Arch	Kobe Universiade Memorial Stadium
Capacity: 48,000	Capacity: 50,000	Capacity: 35,910
1993 FIFA U-17 World Championship is located in Japan
Gifu City	Kyoto	Nagoya
Gifu Nagaragawa Stadium	Nishikyogoku Athletic Stadium	Paloma Mizuho Rugby Stadium
Capacity: 26,109	Capacity: 20,588	Capacity: 15,000

== Qualified Teams ==
Confederation	Qualifying Tournament	Qualifier(s)
AFC (Asia)	Host nation	Japan
AFC (Asia)	1992 AFC U-17 Championship	China; Qatar
CAF (Africa)	1993 African U-17 Qualifying for World Cup	Ghana; Nigeria; Tunisia
CONCACAF (North, Central America & Caribbean)	1992 CONCACAF U-17 Tournament	Canada; Mexico; United States
CONMEBOL (South America)	1993 South American U-17 Football Championship	Argentina; Chile; Colombia
OFC (Oceania)	1993 OFC U-17 Championship	Australia
UEFA (Europe)	1993 UEFA U-16 Championship	Italy; Poland; Czechoslovakia

== Squads ==
For the complete list of players, see 1993 FIFA U-17 World Championship squads.

== Referees ==
Asia

- (Japan) Shin-Ichiro Obata
- (Saudi Arabia) Omar Al-Mohanna

Africa

- (Gabon) Jean-Fidele Diramba
- (The Gambia) Alhagi Faye

CONCACAF

- (Mexico) Benito Archundia
- (United States) Brian Hall

South America

- (Argentina) Javier Castrilli
- (Chile) Salvador Imperatore
- (Colombia) John Toro Rendón

Europe

- (Belgium) Eric Blareau
- (Hungary) Sandor Piller
- (Portugal) José Pratas
- (Sweden) Anders Frisk

== Group stage ==
All times are Japan Standard Time (UTC+9)

=== Group A ===
Pos	Team	Pld	W	D	L	GF	GA	GD	Pts	Qualification
1	Ghana	3	3	0	0	9	1	+8	9	Advanced to quarter finals
2	Japan	3	1	1	1	2	2	0	4	Advanced to quarter finals
3	Mexico	3	1	0	2	4	7	−3	3	
4	Italy	3	0	1	2	1	6	−5	1	

21 August
19:30

Japan	0–1	Ghana
	(Report)	Fameye 5'

Tokyo National Stadium, Tokyo
Attendance: 21,938
Referee: Javier Castrilli

22 August
19:00

Italy	1–2	Mexico
Totti 57'	(Report)	Santa Cruz 38'; E. García 69'

Kobe Universiade Memorial Stadium, Kobe
Attendance: 2,000
Referee: John Toro Rendón

24 August
19:00

Japan	0–0	Italy
	(Report)

Kobe Universiade Memorial Stadium, Kobe
Attendance: 9,000
Referee: Jean-Fidele Diramba

24 August
17:00

Ghana	4–1	Mexico
Dadzie 38', 62'; D. Addo 52'; Duah 77'	(Report)	Santa Cruz 56'

Kobe Universiade Memorial Stadium, Kobe
Attendance: 9,000
Referee: Eric Blareau

26 August
19:00

Japan	2–1	Mexico
Funakoshi 6'; Matsuda 58'	(Report)	E. García 7'

Kobe Universiade Memorial Stadium, Kobe
Attendance: 7,500
Referee: Javier Castrilli

26 August
17:00

Ghana	4–0	Italy
Duah 22'; D. Addo 29'; Fameye 32'; Dadzie 71'	(Report)

Kobe Universiade Memorial Stadium, Kobe
Attendance: 7,500
Referee: John Toro Rendon

=== Group B ===
Pos	Team	Pld	W	D	L	GF	GA	GD	Pts	Qualification
1	Nigeria	3	3	0	0	14	0	+14	9	Advanced to quarter finals
2	Australia	3	1	1	1	7	4	+3	4	Advanced to quarter finals
3	Argentina	3	1	1	1	7	6	+1	4	
4	Canada	3	0	0	3	0	18	−18	0	

22 August
17:00

Australia	2–2	Argentina
Naglieri 6'; Ristevski 27'	(Report)	Grande 34'; Biagini 57'

Mizuho Rugby Stadium, Nagoya
Attendance: 7,952
Referee: Anders Frisk

22 August
19:00

Canada	0–8	Nigeria
	(Report)	Kanu 1', 24', 65' (pen.); Anosike 36', 68'; Ibrahim 43', 77'; Odini 76'

Mizuho Rugby Stadium, Nagoya
Attendance: 7,952
Referee: Salvador Imperatore

24 August
17:00

Australia	5–0	Canada
Carter 5', 12'; Bilokavić 48', 55'; Bosevski 68'	(Report)

Mizuho Rugby Stadium, Nagoya
Attendance: 6,810
Referee: Sandor Piller

24 August
19:00

Argentina	0–4	Nigeria
	(Report)	Oruma 60', 79'; Anosike 62'; Kanu 66'

Mizuho Rugby Stadium, Nagoya
Attendance: 6,810
Referee: Anders Frisk

26 August
17:00

Australia	0–2	Nigeria
	(Report)	Kanu 51'; Oruma 68'

Gifu Nagaragawa Stadium, Gifu City
Attendance: 5,732
Referee: Salvador Imperatore

26 August
19:00

Argentina	5–0	Canada
Vilariño 13'; Domínguez 24'; Grande 33'; Biagini 61'; Cantoro 70'	(Report)

Gifu Nagaragawa Stadium, Gifu City
Attendance: 5,732
Referee: Sandor Piller

=== Group C ===
Pos	Team	Pld	W	D	L	GF	GA	GD	Pts	Qualification
1	Czechoslovakia	3	2	1	0	7	3	+4	7	Advanced to quarter finals
2	United States	3	1	1	1	8	5	+3	4	Advanced to quarter finals
3	Colombia	3	1	0	2	3	6	−3	3	
4	Qatar	3	1	0	2	3	7	−4	3	

22 August
17:00

Colombia	0–2	Qatar
	(Report)	Al-Otaibi 10', 66'

Nishikyogoku Athletic Stadium, Kyoto
Attendance: 4,500
Referee: Benito Archundia

22 August
19:00

United States	2–2	Czechoslovakia
Venditti 12'; Armas 52'	(Report)	Sionko 37'; Ruman 42'

Nishikyogoku Athletic Stadium, Kyoto
Attendance: 4,500
Referee: Alhagi Faye

24 August
17:00

Colombia	2–1	United States
Ciciliano 24'; Madrid 87'	(Report)	Cooks 86'

Nishikyogoku Athletic Stadium, Kyoto
Attendance: 8,200
Referee: José Pratas

24 August
19:00

Qatar	0–2	Czechoslovakia
	(Report)	Spanik 8' (pen.); Ruman 78'

Nishikyogoku Athletic Stadium, Kyoto
Attendance: 8,200
Referee: Alhagi Faye

26 August
17:00

Colombia	1–3	Czechoslovakia
Ciciliano 66'	(Report)	Vápeník 28'; Rada 56'; Novota 77'

Nishikyogoku Athletic Stadium, Kyoto
Attendance: 3,700
Referee: Benito Archundia

26 August
19:00

Qatar	1–5	United States
Al-Enazi 55'	(Report)	Venditti 13'; Moore 14'; Cooks 47', 53', 72'

Nishikyogoku Athletic Stadium, Kyoto
Attendance: 3,700
Referee: José Pratas

=== Group D ===
Pos	Team	Pld	W	D	L	GF	GA	GD	Pts	Qualification
1	Poland	3	2	1	0	8	4	+4	7	Advanced to quarter finals
2	Chile	3	1	2	0	7	5	+2	5	Advanced to quarter finals
3	Tunisia	3	1	0	2	2	5	−3	3	
4	China	3	0	1	2	2	5	−3	1	

22 August
17:00

Chile	2–2	China
Neira 62'; Rozental 67'	(Report)	Yu Genwei 18'; Yao Xia 60'

Hiroshima Big Arch, Hiroshima
Attendance: 1,608
Referee: Brian Hall

22 August
19:00

Tunisia	1–3	Poland
Arouri 54'	(Report)	Kosztowniak 26'; Terlecki 57'; Wyczalkowski 79'

Hiroshima Big Arch, Hiroshima
Attendance: 1,608
Referee: Omar Al-Mohanna

24 August
17:00

Chile	2–0	Tunisia
Tapia 4'; Neira 48'	(Report)

Hiroshima Big Arch, Hiroshima
Attendance: 1,503
Referee: Shin-Ichiro Obata

24 August
19:00

China	0–2	Poland
	(Report)	Kosztowniak 48'; Andruszczak 78'

Hiroshima Big Arch, Hiroshima
Attendance: 1,503
Referee: Omar Al-Mohanna

26 August
17:00

Chile	3–3	Poland
Osorio 38'; Rozental 61' (pen.); Neira 67'	(Report)	Orliński 14', 34'; Wichniarek 43'

Hiroshima Big Arch, Hiroshima
Attendance: 4,851
Referee: Shin-Ichiro Obata

26 August
19:00

China	0–1	Tunisia
	(Report)	Arouri 23'

Hiroshima Big Arch, Hiroshima
Attendance: 4,851
Referee: Eric Blareau

== Knockout stage ==
Quarter-finals
29 August – Kyoto
Chile	4
Czechoslovakia	1
29 August – Kobe
Ghana	1
Australia	0
29 August – Gifu
Nigeria	2
Japan	1
29 August – Hiroshima
Poland	3
United States	0

Semi-finals
1 September – Tokyo
Ghana	3
Chile	0
1 September – Hiroshima
Nigeria	2
Poland	1

Final
4 September – Tokyo
Nigeria	2
Ghana	1
Third place
4 September – Tokyo
Chile	1 (4)
Poland	1 (2)

=== Quarter-finals ===
29 August
19:00

Ghana	1–0 (a.e.t.)	Australia
D. Addo 92'	(Report)

Kobe Universiade Memorial Stadium, Kobe
Attendance: 10,000
Referee: Benito Archundia

29 August
19:00

Nigeria	2–1	Japan
Oruma 1'; Odini 40'	(Report)	Nakata 56'

Gifu Nagaragawa Stadium, Gifu City
Attendance: 19,000
Referee: Sandor Piller

29 August
19:00

Czechoslovakia	1–4	Chile
Ruman 40'	(Report)	Rozental 11' (pen.); Tapia 31'; Neira 65', 66'

Nishikyogoku Athletic Stadium, Kyoto
Attendance: 7,500
Referee: Jean-Fidele Diramba

29 August
19:00

Poland	3–0	United States
Terlecki 39'; Kosztowniak 59'; Magiera 80'	(Report)

Hiroshima Big Arch, Hiroshima
Attendance: 2,854
Referee: John Toro Rendon

=== Semi-finals ===
1 September
19:00

Ghana	3–0	Chile
Fameye 29'; Armah 48'; Duah 80'	(Report)

National Stadium, Tokyo
Attendance: 7,500
Referee: Anders Frisk

1 September
19:00

Nigeria	2–1	Poland
Oruma 52'; Anosike 57'	(Report)	Szymkowiak 79'

Hiroshima Big Arch, Hiroshima
Attendance: 2,500
Referee: Benito Archundia

=== Third place play-off ===
4 September
16:30

Chile	1–1 (a.e.t.) (4–2 pen.)	Poland
Rozental 77' (pen.)	(Report)	Poli 26' (o.g.)

National Stadium, Tokyo
Attendance: 15,000
Referee: Omar Al-Mohanna

=== Final ===
4 September
19:30

Ghana	1–2	Nigeria
Fameye 80'	(Report)	Oruma 3'; Anosike 75'

National Stadium, Tokyo
Attendance: 22,000
Referee: Javier Castrilli

== Result ==
1993 FIFA U-17 World Championship winners

Nigeria
Second title

== Goalscorers ==
Wilson Oruma of Nigeria won the Golden Shoe award for scoring six goals. In total, 107 goals were scored by 56 different players, with only one of them credited as own goal.

6 goals

- (Nigeria) Wilson Oruma

5 goals

- (Chile) Manuel Neira
- (Nigeria) Nwankwo Kanu
- (Nigeria) Peter Anosike

4 goals

- (Chile) Sebastián Rozental
- (Ghana) Joseph Fameye
- (United States) Judah Cooks

3 goals

- (Czechoslovakia) Petr Ruman
- (Ghana) Daniel Addo
- (Ghana) Emmanuel Duah
- (Ghana) Essuman Dadzie
- (Poland) Tomasz Kosztowniak

2 goals

- (Argentina) Andrés Grande
- (Argentina) Leonardo Biagini
- (Australia) Jonathon Carter
- (Australia) Paul Bilokapić
- (Chile) Héctor Tapia
- (Colombia) Ricardo Ciciliano
- (Mexico) Edgar García
- (Mexico) Edgar Santa Cruz
- (Nigeria) Festus Odini
- (Nigeria) Ibrahim
- (Poland) Maciej Terlecki
- (Poland) Piotr Orliński
- (Qatar) Hassan Al-Otaibi
- (Tunisia) Fayzal Arouri
- (United States) Pierre Venditti

1 goal

- (Argentina) Federico Domínguez
- (Argentina) Mauro Cantoro
- (Argentina) Rodrigo Vilariño
- (Australia) David Ristevski
- (Australia) Nick Bosevski
- (Australia) Sebastian Naglieri
- (Chile) Alejandro Osorio
- (China) Yao Xia
- (China) Yu Genwei
- (Colombia) Juan Madrid
- (Czechoslovakia) Libor Sionko
- (Czechoslovakia) Miroslav Rada
- (Czechoslovakia) Miroslav Vápeník
- (Czechoslovakia) Richard Spanik
- (Czechoslovakia) Zoltán Novota
- (Ghana) Daniel Armah
- (Italy) Francesco Totti
- (Japan) Hidetoshi Nakata
- (Japan) Naoki Matsuda
- (Japan) Yuzo Funakoshi
- (Poland) Artur Andruszczak
- (Poland) Artur Wichniarek
- (Poland) Artur Wyczalkowski
- (Poland) Jacek Magiera
- (Poland) Mirosław Szymkowiak
- (Qatar) Mohamed Al-Enazi
- (United States) Jason Moore
- (United States) Steve Armas

Own goal

- (Chile) Dante Poli (playing against Poland)

== Final ranking ==
Rank	Team	Pld	W	D	L	GF	GA	GD	Pts
1	Nigeria	6	6	0	0	20	3	+17	12
2	Ghana	6	5	0	1	14	3	+11	10
3	Chile	6	2	3	1	12	10	+2	7
4	Poland	6	3	2	1	13	7	+6	8
Eliminated in the quarter-finals
5	Czechoslovakia	4	2	1	1	8	7	+1	5
6	Australia	4	1	1	2	7	5	+2	3
7	United States	4	1	1	2	8	8	0	3
8	Japan	4	1	1	2	3	4	−1	3
Eliminated at the group stage
9	Argentina	3	1	1	1	7	6	+1	3
10	Mexico	3	1	0	2	4	7	−3	2
11	Colombia	3	1	0	2	3	6	−3	2
12	Tunisia	3	1	0	2	2	5	−3	2
13	Qatar	3	1	0	2	3	7	−4	2
14	China	3	0	1	2	2	5	−3	1
15	Italy	3	0	1	2	1	6	−5	1
16	Canada	3	0	0	3	0	18	−18	0
