= Anosike =

Anosike is a surname. Notable people with the surname include:

- Nicky Anosike (born 1986), American basketball player
- O. D. Anosike (born 1991), American basketball player, brother of Nicky
- E.J. Anosike (born 1998), American basketball player
- Peter Anosike (born 1976), Nigerian footballer
