= Assist (association football) =

Contribution by a player which helps to score a goal

In association football, an assist is a contribution leading to the scoring of a goal, where the contribution is made by someone on the scoring team other than the scorer. Statistics for assists made by players may be kept officially by the organisers of a competition, or unofficially by, for example, journalists or organisers of fantasy football competitions. Recording assists is not part of the official Laws of the Game and the criteria for an assist to be awarded may vary. Record of assists was virtually not kept at all until the end of the 20th century, although reports of matches commonly described a player as having "made" one or more goals. Since the 1990s, some leagues have kept official record of assists and based awards on them.

The separate player statistics "goals [scored]" and "assists" may be aggregated to a statistic called "[goal] contributions" or "[goal] involvements" (analogous to what is called a point in ice hockey).

== Criteria ==
Most commonly, an assist is credited to a player for passing or crossing the ball to the scorer. It may also be awarded to a player whose shot rebounds (off a defender, goalkeeper or goalpost) to a teammate who scores. Some systems may credit an assist to a player who wins a penalty kick or a free kick for another player to convert, or to an attacking player for contributing to an own goal. A goal may be unassisted, or have one assist; some systems allow for two assists.

=== Opta criteria ===
Opta, a British sports analytics company and the official provider of Premier League statistics, defines an assist as "The final touch from a teammate, which leads to the recipient of the ball scoring a goal". Opta requires that if the assist is deflected by an opposition player, it must be deemed as travelling to the goalscorer irrespective of the deflection. Also according to Opta, "in the event of an own goal, direct free kick goal, and direct corner goal, an assist will not be awarded. This same rule applies to penalties unless the penalty taker chooses to pass the ball for another player to score."

According to Opta, an assist is not awarded in the following cases:

- Goals scored directly from penalty kicks, direct free kicks, or corner-kicks
- Own goals
- Deflected or rebounded balls from opponents that affected the ball's delivery to the goal scorer.
- Balls rebounded off the post.

Opta attest that this strict definition makes assist statistics more accurate and fair in analyzing players' sports performance.

=== FIFA World Cup ===
FIFA's Technical Study Group is responsible for awarding assist points at the FIFA World Cup. In the Technical Study Group's report on the 1986 World Cup, the authors calculated for the first time unofficial statistics for assists, developing the following criteria:

1. An assist was awarded to the player who had given the last pass to the goalscorer.
2. In addition, the last but two holder of the ball could get an assist provided that his action had decisive importance for the goal.
3. After goals from rebounds those players were awarded an assist who had shot on target.
4. After goals scored on penalty or by a directly converted free-kick the fouled player received a point.
5. In case that the goalscorer had laid on the goal for himself (dribble, solo run), no assists were awarded.
6. No assists were awarded, either, if the goalscorer took advantage of a missed pass by an opponent.

The 1990 World Cup technical report adopted similar criteria, but changed the free-kick/penalty criterion:

- Where goals resulting from penalties are concerned, the player who is fouled in the area receives an assist point (unless, that is, the player who is fouled subsequently executes the penalty himself).

Planet World Cup has calculated some retrospective data on assists back to the 1966 World Cup, though the 1986 data differs from that of FIFA.

FIFA started officially keeping track of assists in World Cup tournaments at the 1994 edition. This was popularly ascribed to the popularity of detailed sports statistics among fans. 1994 was also the first World Cup in which assists were used as a tie-breaker in determining the Golden Shoe award for top scorer. In the event, both Hristo Stoichkov and Oleg Salenko tied with 19 points, from 6 goals and 1 assist.

=== France ===
The French league, Ligue 1, awards the Trophée de Meilleur Passeur ("best passer trophy") to the player with most "decisive passes" in a season, starting in the 2007–08 season. Sports newspaper L'Équipe had unofficially tracked assists for some years prior to then. The league's Commission des Compétitions includes blocked shots as a subset of "decisive passes". In 2012–13, Mathieu Valbuena and Dimitri Payet finished with 12 assists, Valbuena winning the trophy by having fewer blocked shots (3 against 5) among his total.

=== Spain ===
For the 1998–99 La Liga season, SDI sold its Gecasport database to Spanish media, in which asistencias de gol were described as "passes which lead immediately to a shot and goal".

=== Ukraine ===
In Ukraine, a traceable documentation of assists calculation started out by Ukrainian newspaper "Komanda" during the 2004–05 season of the Ukrainian Higher League (Vyshcha Liha). The calculation of assist has certain problems to establish what is the "last pass" which led to a scored goal. Different institutions have own perception of it. Some specialists consider that an assist has to be a deliberate action meaning that it does not include the situation when a ball randomly rebounded to a scoring striker.

=== United Kingdom ===
In the United Kingdom, official game statistics, including assists, for the Premier League, the Scottish Premiership, and the English Football League are provided by PA Sport under the Actim brand. Since the 2006–07 season, assists have been factored into the Actim Index of Premier League player performance. The assist statistics provided by fantasy football competitions may differ from the Actim data; some uniformly credit an assist to whichever teammate last touched the ball before the scorer, regardless of other circumstances of the play. The Premier League Playmaker of the Season award was introduced in the 2017–18 Premier League for the player with most assists.

=== United States ===
The original North American Soccer League kept assist statistics from its foundation in 1968, as its forebears the United Soccer Association and National Professional Soccer League had done the previous year. Analogous statistics were already being kept in basketball and in ice hockey, both established North American sports.

Major League Soccer formerly awarded the MLS Golden Boot based on 2 points per goal scored and one per assist.

The NCAA makes regulations for statistics, including assists, in college soccer in the U.S. Two players may be credited with assists if the second did not have to beat a defender before passing to the scorer. No assist is awarded for winning a penalty. If a goal is scored after a save, block, or rebound from the goal frame, the first shooter gets an assist.

== Statistics ==
These totals are the official records recognised by the relevant governing body. Independent statistics providers may have different data, either through crediting different players for a given goal, or through having begun recording assists earlier or later than the official statistics provider. Expected assists (xA) is a performance metric that measures the likelihood that a completed pass becomes an assist, factoring in distance and the type of pass.

=== Players with most assists in all competitions (all-time) ===
Notes: The criteria for an assist to be awarded may vary according to the source, the following stats is based on the assists criteria according to Opta, where assists are not counted for balls that are deflected or rebounded off opposing players and have clearly affected the trajectory of the ball and its arrival to the recipient (the goal scorer). Assists are also not counted for penalty kicks, direct goals from corners or free kicks, or own goals. These statistics are based on official matches only. At least 300 assists. Bold indicates players currently active. As of 15 November 2026.

| Player | P | Career | Teams(s) | A | M | R/N |
|---|---|---|---|---|---|---|
| (Argentina) **Lionel Messi** | FW | 2004– | Barcelona, Paris Saint-Germain, Inter Miami, Argentina | 428 | 1,184 | |
| (Hungary) Ferenc Puskás | FW | 1943–1966 | Budapest Honvéd, Real Madrid, Hungary, Spain, Madrid | 374 | 719 | |
| (Brazil) Pelé | FW | 1956–1977 | Santos, New York Cosmos, Brazil | 366 | 818 | |
| (Netherlands) Johan Cruyff | FW | 1964–1984 | Ajax, Barcelona, Los Angeles Aztecs, Washington Diplomats, Levante, Feyenoord, Netherlands | 358 | 761 | |
| (Serbia) **Dušan Tadić** | MF | 2006– | Vojvodina, Groningen, Twente, Southampton, Ajax, Fenerbahçe, Al-Wahda, NEC Nijmegen, Serbia | 328 | 972 | |
| (England) Stanley Matthews | FW | 1932–1965 | Stoke City, Blackpool, Toronto City, England | 320 | 851 | |
| (Brazil) Alex | MF | 1995–2014 | Coritiba, Palmeiras, Flamengo, Cruzeiro, Fenerbahce, Brasil | 307 | 929 | |
| (Belgium) **Kevin De Bruyne** | MF | 2006– | Genk, Chelsea, Werder Bremen, Manchester City, Napoli, Belgium | 302 | 816 | |

=== Players with most assists in international football (all-time) ===
Bold indicates players currently active at international level.

| Rank | Player | Team | Assists | Refs |
|---|---|---|---|---|
| 1 | (Argentina) Lionel Messi | Argentina | 67 | |
| 2 | (Brazil) Neymar | Brazil | 59 | |
| 3 | (United States) Landon Donovan | United States | 58 | |
| 4 | (Hungary) Ferenc Puskás | Hungary | 53 | |
| 5 | (Hungary) Sándor Kocsis | Hungary | 51 | |
| 6 | (Belgium) **Kevin De Bruyne** | Belgium | 51 | |
| 7 | (Qatar) **Akram Afif** | Qatar | 49 | |
| 8 | (Brazil) Pelé | Brazil | 47 | |
| 9 | (Colombia) James Rodríguez | Colombia | 43 | |
| 10 | (Germany) Thomas Müller | Germany | 41 | |

=== Players with most assists in a given competition (all-time) ===
| Competition | Records began | Leading player(s) | Team(s) | Assists | Refs |
|---|---|---|---|---|---|
| FIFA World Cup | 1930 | (Argentina) Lionel Messi | Argentina | 12 | |
| UEFA European Championship | 1960 | (Czech Republic) Karel Poborský | Czechia | 8 | |
| UEFA European Championship | 1960 | (Portugal) Cristiano Ronaldo | Portugal | 8 | |
| Copa América | 1916 | (Argentina) Lionel Messi | Argentina | 18 | |
| FIFA Club World Cup | 2000 | (Argentina) Neri Cardozo | Boca Juniors, Monterrey | 5 | |
| FIFA Club World Cup | 2000 | (Japan) Shoma Doi | Kashima Antlers | 5 | |
| FIFA World Cup qualification (CONMEBOL) | 1994 | (Brazil) Neymar | Brazil | 19 | |
| UEFA Champions League | 1992 | (Wales) Ryan Giggs (Note: UEFA lists Cristiano Ronaldo first with 42 assists.) | Manchester United | 41 | |
| UEFA Cup/UEFA Europa League | 2001 | (Czech Republic) Bořek Dočkal | Slovan Liberec, Rosenborg, Slavia Prague | 26 | |
| UEFA Super Cup | 1973 | (Wales) Gareth Bale | Real Madrid | 3 | |
| UEFA Super Cup | 1973 | (Spain) Vitolo | Sevilla, Atlético Madrid | 3 | |
| Premier League | 1992 | (Wales) Ryan Giggs | Manchester United | 162 | |
| La Liga | 1929 | (Argentina) Lionel Messi | Barcelona | 192 | |
| Serie A | 1986 | (Italy) Francesco Totti | Roma | 158 | |
| Bundesliga | 1992 | (Germany) Thomas Müller | Bayern Munich | 178 | |
| Major League Soccer | 1996 | (United States) Landon Donovan | LA Galaxy | 136 | |
| Ligue 1 | 2001 | (France) Dimitri Payet | Nantes, Saint-Étienne, Lille, Marseille | 115 | |
| Brazilian Série A | 2015 | (Uruguay) Giorgian de Arrascaeta | Cruzeiro, Flamengo | 82 | |

=== Players with most assists in a given competition (single season) ===
| Competition | Player(s) | Team(s) | Assists | Season(s) | Refs |
|---|---|---|---|---|---|
| FIFA World Cup | (France) Raymond Kopa | France | 8 (Note: FIFA and Opta, credit Michael Olise with the most assists at a single World Cup (7 in 2026). However, their assist statistics only cover recorded assists from the 1966 World Cup onwards. Consequently, these statistics do not account for earlier tournaments.) (Note: Some sources credit Kopa with nine assists, including one additional non-Opta assist (or "fantasy assist") against Paraguay in the group stage of the 1958 World Cup, where his shot was blocked before Maryan Wisniewski scored; sequence confirmed by the FFF.) | 1958 | |
| UEFA European Championship | (Socialist Federal Republic of Yugoslavia) Ljubinko Drulović | Yugoslavia | 4 | 2000 | |
| UEFA European Championship | (Czech Republic) Karel Poborský | Czechia | 4 | 2004 | |
| UEFA European Championship | (Belgium) Eden Hazard | Belgium | 4 | 2016 | |
| UEFA European Championship | (Wales) Aaron Ramsey | Wales | 4 | 2016 | |
| Copa América | (Colombia) James Rodríguez | Colombia | 6 | 2024 | |
| UEFA Champions League | (Portugal) Luís Figo | Barcelona | 9 | 1999–2000 | |
| Major League Soccer | (Colombia) Carlos Valderrama | Tampa Bay Mutiny | 26 (Note: As Major League Soccer recognizes secondary assists, some sources count Carlos Valderrama record with 21 assists.) | 2000 | |
| La Liga | (Spain) Míchel | Real Madrid | 21 | 1987–88 | |
| La Liga | (Argentina) Lionel Messi | Barcelona | 21 | 2019–20 | |
| Bundesliga | (Germany) Thomas Müller | Bayern Munich | 21 | 2019–20 | |
| Premier League | (Portugal) Bruno Fernandes | Manchester United | 21 | 2025–26 | |
| Ligue 1 | (Argentina) Ángel Di María | Paris Saint-Germain | 18 | 2015–16 | |
| Serie A | (Italy) Federico Dimarco | Inter Milan | 18 | 2025–26 | |
| Brazilian Série A | (Argentina) Darío Conca | Fluminense | 19 | 2010 | |
