= 1994 FIFA World Cup qualification (inter-confederation play-offs) =

Tournament details
- Dates: 31 July – 17 November 1993
- Teams: 3 (from 3 confederations)

Tournament statistics
- Matches played: 4
- Goals scored: 9 (2.25 per match)
- Attendance: 157,492 (39,373 per match)
- Top scorer(s): (Argentina) Abel Balbo (Australia) Mehmet Durakovic (Australia) Frank Farina (Australia) Aurelio Vidmar (Canada) Lyndon Hooper (Canada) Domenic Mobilio (Canada) Mark Watson (1 goal each)

For the 1994 FIFA World Cup qualification, there were two inter-confederation play-offs to determine the final qualification spot to the 1994 FIFA World Cup. The matches were played between 31 July – 17 November 1993.

== Format ==
The three teams from the three confederations (CONCACAF, CONMEBOL, and OFC) were drawn into two ties. The CONCACAF and OFC teams faced each other first, with the winner advancing to play the CONMEBOL team.

The play-offs were played over two legs, with each team playing one leg at home. The team that scored more goals on aggregate over the two legs advanced. If the aggregate score was level, the away goals rule is applied, i.e. the team that scored more goals away from home over the two legs advanced. If away goals were also equal, then thirty minutes of extra time was played. The away goals rule was again applied after extra time, i.e. if there are goals scored during extra time and the aggregate score is still level, the visiting team advances by virtue of more away goals scored. If no goals are scored during extra time, the tie was decided by penalty shoot-out.

== Qualified teams ==
Confederation	Placement	Team
Entering first round
CONCACAF	Final round runners-up	Canada
OFC	Second round winners	Australia
Entering second round
CONMEBOL	Group A runners-up	Argentina

== Bracket ==
First round
Canada	2	1	3 (1)
Australia (p)	1	2	3 (4)

Second round
Australia	1	0	1
Argentina	1	1	2

== Matches ==
The matches were played between 31 July – 17 November 1993.

=== First round: CONCACAF v OFC ===
Team 1	Agg.	Team 2	1st leg	2nd leg
Canada	3–3 (1–4 p)	Australia	2–1	1–2 (a.e.t.)

31 July 1993
15:30 UTC–6

Canada	2–1	Australia
Watson 50'; Mobilio 57'	Report	Dasovic 44' (o.g.)

Commonwealth Stadium, Edmonton
Attendance: 27,775
Referee: Arturo Carter (Mexico)
15 August 1993
16:00 UTC+10

Australia	2–1 (a.e.t.)	Canada
Farina 45'; Durakovic 77'	Report	Hooper 54'
Penalties
Wade (penalty scored); A. Vidmar (penalty scored); Tobin (penalty scored); Farina (penalty scored)	4–1	(penalty scored) Mitchell; (penalty missed) Bunbury; (penalty missed) Sweeney

Sydney Football Stadium, Sydney
Attendance: 25,982
Referee: Shin-Ichiro Obata (Japan)

3–3 on aggregate. Australia won 4–1 on penalties and advanced to the play-off against the CONMEBOL team.

=== Second round: OFC v CONMEBOL ===
Team 1	Agg.	Team 2	1st leg	2nd leg
Australia	1–2	Argentina	1–1	0–1

31 October 1993
20:10 UTC+11

Australia	1–1	Argentina
Vidmar 42'		Balbo 37'

Sydney Football Stadium, Sydney
Attendance: 43,967
Referee: Sándor Puhl (Hungary)
17 November 1993
21:15 UTC–3

Argentina	1–0	Australia
Tobin 59' (o.g.)

Estadio Monumental, Buenos Aires
Attendance: 59,768
Referee: Peter Mikkelsen (Denmark)

Argentina won 2–1 on aggregate and qualified for the 1994 FIFA World Cup.

== Goalscorers ==
There were 9 goals scored in 4 matches, for an average of 2.25 goals per match.

1 goal

- (Argentina) Abel Balbo
- (Australia) Mehmet Durakovic
- (Australia) Frank Farina
- (Australia) Aurelio Vidmar
- (Canada) Lyndon Hooper
- (Canada) Domenic Mobilio
- (Canada) Mark Watson

1 own goal

- (Australia) Alex Tobin (against Argentina)
- (Canada) Nick Dasovic (against Australia)
