= Manuel Neira =

Chilean footballer (born 1977)

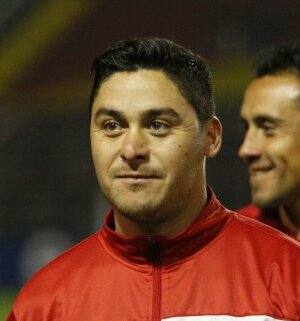
- Neira with Unión San Felipe in 2012

Personal information
- Full name: Manuel Alejandro Neira Díaz
- Date of birth: 12 October 1977 (age 49)
- Place of birth: Santiago, Chile
- Height: 1.75 m (5 ft 9 in)
- Position: Forward

Youth career
- Colo-Colo

Senior career*
Years	Team	Apps	(Gls)
1993–1998	Colo-Colo	30	(9)
1994	→ São Paulo (loan)	0	(0)
1996	→ Everton (loan)	21	(11)
1998–1999	Las Palmas	17	(4)
1999	→ Colo-Colo (loan)	8	(6)
2000–2001	Racing Club	9	(2)
2001	Unión Española	17	(11)
2001–2002	América de Cali	9	(2)
2002–2004	Colo-Colo	82	(37)
2005	Chiapas	11	(0)
2005–2006	Unión Española	59	(36)
2006	Alania Vladikavkaz	1	(0)
2007	Hapoel Tel Aviv	0	(0)
2007–2009	Unión Española	52	(24)
2010	Deportes La Serena	7	(5)
2010	Universidad Católica (ECU)	6	(0)
2011	San Luis	24	(5)
2012	Santiago Morning	5	(2)
2012	Unión San Felipe	3	(0)
Total		365	(154)

International career
1993	Chile U17		
1995–1997	Chile U20		
1998–2006	Chile	13	(2)
1998	Chile B	1	(2)
- * Club domestic league appearances and goals

Manuel Alejandro Neira Díaz (born 12 October 1977) is a Chilean former professional footballer who played as a forward for clubs including Colo-Colo (Chile), UD Las Palmas (Spain), Racing Club (Argentina) and Unión Española (Chile), and scored 2 goals in 13 internationals, including selections for the 1998 FIFA World Cup and the 2001 Copa América.

== Club career ==
=== Early career ===
Neira began his career, aged seventeen, at Primera División Chilena club Colo-Colo before moving to the Brazilian club São Paulo FC in 1994, after a notable performance at the 1993 FIFA U-17 World Championships. In the next season, Neira return to Colo-Colo, but in 1996 Neira was loaned to Everton de Viña del Mar of the Primera B in this time.

From 1997 to 1998, Neira was consolidated as player in Colo-Colo, winning the Primera División Chilena title in two consecutive occasions, the 1997 and 1998 season. In December 1998, Colo-Colo sold Neira to the Spanish club UD Las Palmas. However, he was loaned back to Colo-Colo for one season. When Neira returned to the club, he proclaimed champion of the 1999–2000 Segunda División title. Neira was transferred to an Argentine "giant club" Racing Club de Avellaneda for the 2000–01 season. In the Torneo Apertura 2000, Neira only scored 2 goals in 9 games. During the summer of 2001, Neira was transferred to Unión Española, where he made a notable performance scoring 11 goals in 17 games, being one of the top-scorer of the Torneo Apertura. In June 2001, Neira was signed by the Colombian club América de Cali.

=== Colo-Colo ===
In January 2002, Neira was once again transferred to Colo-Colo. He obtained the runner–up title with the club in the Torneo Apertura, after Colo–Colo's 3–0 defeat against Cobreloa in the final. But in the Torneo Clausura of the same year, Neira made one of his most notable season in his career, winning the top–scorer title with 14 goals, and also winning the Primera Division title, after of win to Universidad Católica in the finals.

In the next season, the team lost twice in the same year the final against Cobreloa. However, Neira scored 21 goals in 42 matches over the season. There were many rumors that he would be transferred to Europe, which did not materialize. He played the Torneo Apertura 2004 scoring 1 goal in 16 matches. In June 2004, he was transferred to the Mexican club Chiapas. He remained there for one season in and then was transferred to Unión Española for second time in his career.

=== Unión Española ===
With Unión, Neira won the Torneo Apertura 2005 title, after of the victory against Coquimbo Unido for 2–1. In the next season (2006), Neira scored 19 goals in 29 matches. In December 2006, he was released of Unión and he received many offers for several clubs.

In January 2007, he agreed upon moving to Hapoel Tel Aviv F.C. on a one-year deal with the club until December 2007, refusing an offer from Colo-Colo in this time.

In his second game for the team, in the Channel One Cup, he was injured severely by CSKA Moscow player Elvir Rahimić. Neira suffered two fractures in his ankle, and had to sit out for the rest of the season before he even played a single league game for Hapoel.

For the Torneo Clausura 2007, Neira return to Unión, after of Neira was released of the club. He made his Unión re–debut against Everton at Sausalito Stadium, in a 0–0 draw. He scored his first goal in his third cycle in the club against his former club Colo–Colo, in a 2–2 draw. Finally, Neira scored 9 goals in 19 matches for the tournament.

In December 2007, he tried his luck at the Süper Lig club Gaziantepspor, Neira only trained with them for a couple of weeks, but was not liked by the coach, and returned to Unión Española.

During 2008, in the Torneo Apertura 2008, he scored 3 goals in 12 matches. In the Torneo de Clausura 2008 he became a key player of the club, scoring 6 goals in 15 matches. However, the club ended up in the relegation/promotion play-offs. Neira helped the team by scoring 2 goals in 2 matches against Deportes Puerto Montt to save them from relegation.

== International career ==
Neira's first international appearance with Chile national football team was in the FIFA U-17 World Championship 1993 celebrated in Japan. In this tournament he was one of top–scorers of the tournament with Peter Anosike and Nwankwo Kanu with 5 goals under Wilson Oruma with 6 goals winning the third place of the tournament.

He participate in the Chile national under-20 football team, he played in the South American Youth Championship in the years 1995 and 1997.

He was selected for the 1998 FIFA World Cup Chilean squad, but did not play. Prior to this, he played for Chile B against England B on 10 February 1998. Chile won by 2-1 and Neira scored the two goals.

== Personal life ==
Neira married the Chilean model and TV personality Pamela Díaz in 2006. They have two children, Trinidad and Mateo, and got divorced in 2008.

Neira married the flight attendant Francisca Morales in 2013 and they have three children. His son, Santiago, has been with the Colo-Colo youth ranks.

== Career statistics ==
Scores and results list Chile's goal tally first.

No	Date	Venue	Opponent	Score	Result	Competition
1.	31 January 1998	Hong Kong Stadium, Wan Chai, Hong Kong	Iran	1–0	1–1	1998 Lunar New Year Cup
2.	17 February 1999	Estadio Mateo Flores, Guatemala City, Guatemala	Guatemala	1–0	1–1	Friendly

== Honours ==
Colo-Colo

- Chilean Primera División: 1997 Clausura, 1998, 2002 Clausura

Unión Española

- Chilean Primera División: 2005 Apertura

Individual

- Chilean Primera División top scorer: 2002 Clausura
