= Orliński =

Orliński (feminine: Orlińska; plural: Orlińscy) is a Polish surname. Notable people with this surname include:

- Bolesław Orliński (1899–1992), Polish aviator
- Richard Orlinski (born 1966), French artist
- Jakub Józef Orliński (born 1990), Polish opera singer
- Piotr Orliński (born 1976), Polish footballer
- Wojciech Orliński (born 1969), Polish writer

== See also ==
- Isidoro Orlanski (born 1939), Argentinian-American meteorologist
- Orlinsky
