= Fifa 1994 =

Fifa 1994 may refer to:

== 1994 FIFA World Cup finals ==
- 1994 FIFA World Cup

== 1994 FIFA World Cup qualification ==
- 1994 FIFA World Cup qualification

== EA Sports video game series ==
- FIFA International Soccer
