= Dante Poli =

Chilean footballer (born 1976)

Personal information
- Full name: Dante Eugenio Poli García
- Date of birth: 15 August 1976 (age 50)
- Place of birth: Arica, Chile
- Height: 1.87 m (6 ft 2 in)
- Position: Centre-back

Youth career
- 1991–1993: Universidad Católica

Senior career*
Years	Team	Apps	(Gls)
1994–2002	Universidad Católica	70	(4)
2002–2003	Nueva Chicago	20	(1)
2003–2004	Skoda Xanthi	12	(0)
2004–2005	Unión Española	27	(0)
2005–2006	Puerto Rico Islanders	7	(0)
Total		136	(5)

International career
1993	Chile U17	13	(2)
1995	Chile U20	7	(1)
1997	Chile	2	(0)
- * Club domestic league appearances and goals

Dante Eugenio Poli García (born 15 August 1976) is a Chilean football pundit and former player. He played as a defender.

== Club career ==
Born in Arica, Poli began his career with Santiago-based club Universidad Católica, with whom he won the Chilean Primera División title in 1997 and 2002. He went on trial with Manchester United in July and August 1997, and played in three friendlies for the club, but was not signed on a permanent basis. In 2003, he left Chile for Argentine side Nueva Chicago, but shortly after finally moved to Europe to sign for Greek club Skoda Xanthi. However, he lasted only a season there before returning to Chile with Unión Española in 2004. He moved to the Puerto Rico Islanders in 2005, where he finished his career, retiring in 2006.

== International career ==
He played for Chile in both the 1993 FIFA U17 World Championship in Japan, where Chile reached the third place, and the 1995 FIFA U20 Championship in Qatar. In addition, he took part of Chile squad in both the 1993 South American U17 Championship and the 1995 South American U20 Championship.

At senior level, in 1997 he made two appearances for Chile in both the friendly match against Jamaica and the 1997 Copa América match against Ecuador.

== Post-retirement ==
In 2009, Poli graduated as a football manager at the INAF (National Football Institute), but he hasn't practiced the profession.

Poli works as a sports commentator on both ESPN Chile and Radio Futuro. Previously, he worked on the sports channels CDF and Fox Sports Chile.

== Honours ==
Universidad Católica

- Primera División de Chile: 1997 Apertura, 2002 Apertura
- Copa Chile: 1995

Chile U17

- FIFA U-17 World Cup third place: 1993
