= Haruna Babangida =

Nigerian former professional footballer (born 1982)

Personal information
- Full name: Haruna Babangida
- Date of birth: 1 October 1982 (age 44)
- Place of birth: Kaduna, Nigeria
- Height: 1.66 m (5 ft 5 in)
- Position: Winger

Youth career
- Shooting Stars
- 1995–1997: Ajax
- 1997–1998: Barcelona

Senior career*
| Years | Team | Apps | (Gls) |
| 1998–2004 | Barcelona B | 130 | (46) |
| 2002–2003 | → Terrassa (loan) | 38 | (5) |
| 2004 | → Cádiz (loan) | 14 | (0) |
| 2004–2005 | Metalurh Donetsk | 10 | (2) |
| 2005–2007 | Olympiacos | 33 | (5) |
| 2007–2009 | Apollon Limassol | 54 | (18) |
| 2009 | Kuban Krasnodar | 14 | (1) |
| 2010 | Mainz 05 II | 2 | (2) |
| 2010 | Mainz 05 | 1 | (0) |
| 2011 | Vitesse Arnhem | 7 | (1) |
| 2012 | Kapfenberger SV | 24 | (2) |
| 2015 | Mosta | 11 | (4) |
| Total | | 318 | (82) |

International career
| 2003 | Nigeria | 1 | (0) |
- * Club domestic league appearances and goals

Haruna Babangida (born 1 October 1982) is a Nigerian former professional footballer who played as a winger.

Babangida is the eighth of ten brothers; he is the younger brother of Tijani Babangida and Ibrahim Babangida.

== Club career ==
=== Early career ===
Born in Kaduna, Haruna Babangida started his youth career at Shooting Stars, before signing for Ajax at the age of 13. He was snapped up by Barcelona a year later. In 1998, aged 15, Babangida made his first-team debut for the Catalan club in a pre-season friendly against AGOVV Apeldoorn, becoming the second youngest ever player to feature for Barcelona. However, he did not make the breakthrough and in 2002–03 was loaned to second division side Terrassa, before spending the following season playing for Barcelona B and Cádiz (in the second half).

Metalurh Donetsk then took him to Ukraine on a permanent basis.

=== Greece and Cyprus ===
In 2005, Olympiacos signed Babangida on a three-year contract after he impressed in a pre-season tournament in Spain.

In the first season, he played 25 league appearances and started 11 times for the double-winners. He rarely scored, but scored his first UEFA Champions League goal at home against Lyon, in the third minute, but the match ended as a 1–4 loss.

On 25 May 2007, Olympiacos officially released Haruna Babangida.

He made his debut for Apollon Limassol on 1 September 2007 against rival team AEL Limassol, where he scored two goals in an eventual 4–3 win.

=== Mainz 05 ===
On 14 June 2010, he signed a one-year contract for Mainz 05 with an option to extend the contract for two more years. On 26 June 2010, he scored his first goal against Panathinaikos. The half season that was less than successful for Babangida, with only a single appearance in the Bundesliga. In December of that year, Mainz released him.

=== Vitesse ===
On 12 January 2011, he joined Vitesse as a testplayer and on 16 January he signed a contract until the end of the season.

== International career ==
He made his debut for Nigeria on 20 August 2003, in a friendly match which Nigeria lost 0–3 to Japan in Tokyo.

== Club statistics ==
| Club performance | | | League | | Cup | | League Cup | | Continental | | Total | |
| Season | Club | League | Apps | Goals | Apps | Goals | Apps | Goals | Apps | Goals | Apps | Goals |
| Spain | | | League | | Copa del Rey | | Copa de la Liga | | Europe | | Total | |
|---|---|---|---|---|---|---|---|---|---|---|---|---|
| 2002–03 | Terrassa | Segunda División | 38 | 5 | | | | | – | – | | |
| 2003–04 | Cádiz | Segunda División | 14 | 0 | | | | | – | – | | |
| Ukraine | | | League | | Ukrainian Cup | | League Cup | | Europe | | Total | |
| 2004–05 | Metalurh Donetsk | Premier League | 8 | 2 | | | | | 0 | 0 | | |
| 2005–06 | Metalurh Donetsk | Premier League | 2 | 0 | | | | | 0 | 0 | | |
| Greece | | | League | | Greek Cup | | League Cup | | Europe | | Total | |
| 2005–06 | Olympiacos | Alpha Ethniki | 25 | 2 | | | | | 6 | 1 | | |
| 2006–07 | Olympiacos | Super League | 8 | 1 | | | | | 2 | 0 | | |
| Cyprus | | | League | | Cypriot Cup | | League Cup | | Europe | | Total | |
| 2007–08 | Apollon Limassol | First Division | 23 | 9 | | | | | – | – | | |
| 2008–09 | Apollon Limassol | First Division | 31 | 9 | | | | | – | – | | |
| Russia | | | League | | Russian Cup | | Premier League Cup | | Europe | | Total | |
| 2009 | Kuban Krasnodar | Premier League | 14 | 1 | | | | | – | – | | |
| Germany | | | League | | DFB-Pokal | | DFB Ligapokal | | Europe | | Total | |
| 2010–11 | Mainz | Bundesliga | 1 | 0 | | | | | – | – | | |
| Country | Spain | | 52 | 5 | | | | | | | | |
| Country | Ukraine | | 10 | 2 | | | | | | | | |
| Country | Greece | | 33 | 3 | | | | | | | | |
| Country | Cyprus | | 54 | 18 | | | | | | | | |
| Country | Russia | | 14 | 1 | | | | | | | | |
| Country | Germany | | 1 | 0 | | | | | | | | |
| Total | | | 163 | 29 | | | | | | | | |

Nigeria national team
| Year | Apps | Goals |
|---|---|---|
| 2003 | 1 | 0 |
| Total | 1 | 0 |

== Honours ==
Olympiacos

- Greek Championship: 2005–2006, 2006–2007
