= Orlinsky =

Orlinsky is a version of the Polish surname Orliński. Russian language feminine form: Orlinskaya. Notable people with the surname include:

- Harry Orlinsky, American scholar
- Walter Orlinsky, American politician

== Fictional characters ==
- Darya and Katerina Orlinsky from The Cossack Whip, 1916 American silent drama film
