= Judah Cooks =

American soccer player-coach

Personal information
- Date of birth: November 29, 1976 (age 49)
- Place of birth: Washington, D.C., U.S.
- Height: 6 ft 1 in (1.85 m)
- Position: Midfielder

College career
Years	Team	Apps	(Gls)
1996–1997	Maryland Terrapins		

Senior career*
Years	Team	Apps	(Gls)
1998–2001	D.C. United	26	(2)
1998–2000	→ MLS Pro-40 (loan)	28	(1)
2001	Charleston Battery	5	(0)
2001	→ Miami Fusion (loan)	1	(0)
2001	Milwaukee Rampage		
2002	Atlanta Silverbacks		
2003	Syracuse Salty Dogs	16	(0)

International career
	United States U17	4	(4)
- United States U23

Managerial career
- 2008–2017: D.C. United U-18
- * Club domestic league appearances and goals

Judah Cooks is an American retired soccer midfielder and former coach of the D.C. United Academy U-18 team. He played professionally in Major League Soccer and the USL A-League and was a member of the United States men's national under-17 soccer team at the 1993 FIFA U-17 World Championship.

== Youth ==
Cooks graduated from Walt Whitman High School where he was a two-time high school All-American soccer player. In addition to his outstanding high school career, Cooks also played all four games for the United States men's national under-17 soccer team at the 1993 FIFA U-17 World Championship, scoring four goals. Cooks signed a letter of intent to attend and play soccer at Rutgers University. In the fall of 1995, Cooks entered the University of Maryland. Cooks played two seasons with the Terps (1996–1997) before leaving school early to turn professional. His younger brother Micah Cooks also played professionally at D.C. United, both of them playing on the same team from 2000 through 2001.

== Professional ==
In January 1998, Cooks signed a Project-40 contract with Major League Soccer. The league then placed him with D.C. United. In 1998 and 1999, Cooks played for both Project 40 in the USISL A-League and D.C. United in MLS. On May 4, 2001, United waived Cooks. He signed with the Charleston Battery of the USL A-League. In June 2001, the Battery sent him on loan to the Miami Fusion for one game. Cooks played five games for the Battery, then moved to the Milwaukee Rampage at the end of the season. In 2002, he played for the Atlanta Silverbacks and in 2003 for the Syracuse Salty Dogs.

== Coaching ==
In February 2017, Cooks joined Washington Capital United as the technical director of coaching after serving as coaching at Weston FC in Florida.

In March 2024, Cooks was hired as the head coach at DeMatha Catholic High School in Hyattsville, MD.

== Honours ==
=== Club ===
D.C. United

- MLS Cup: 1999
