= Tijani Babangida =

Nigerian footballer (born 1973)

Personal information
- Date of birth: 25 September 1973 (age 53)
- Place of birth: Kaduna, Nigeria
- Height: 1.69 m (5 ft 7 in)
- Position: Winger

Youth career
- Arewa Textiles
- Niger Tornadoes

Senior career*
Years	Team	Apps	(Gls)
1991–1996	Roda JC	78	(26)
1991–1993	→ VVV-Venlo (loan)	34	(19)
1996–2003	Ajax	77	(20)
2000–2001	→ Gençlerbirliği (loan)	12	(2)
2001–2002	→ Vitesse (loan)	14	(1)
2002–2003	→ Ittihad (loan)	5	(0)
2003–2004	Changchun Yatai	29	(8)
Total		249	(76)

International career
1994–2004	Nigeria	36	(5)
Medal record
Representing Nigeria
Men's Football
Gold medal – first place	1996 Atlanta	Team competition
- * Club domestic league appearances and goals

Tijani Babangida (born 25 September 1973) is a Nigerian former professional footballer who played as a winger. Known for his pace, his playing style was sometimes compared to that of Marc Overmars. Babangida spent the majority of his playing career at Ajax. Overall, he played in five countries on three continents. At club level, Babangida spent nine years in the Netherlands, playing for Roda JC, VVV-Venlo, Ajax, and Vitesse. winning the Eredivisie plus KNVB Cup double with the last side.

He played over 30 games for his national side, including four at the 1998 World Cup in France. He participated in two Africa Cup of Nations tournaments and won the 1996 Olympics with Nigeria. Babangida made his international debut in 1994. He lost his place in the squad right before the 2002 World Cup. After a two-year lay-off from international football, Babangida was recalled to the Nigeria team for the 2004 African Cup of Nations preparations in Tunisia.

== Club career ==
=== Early career ===
Babangida was born in Kaduna, Nigeria. In 1991, at the age of 17, he left club Niger Tornadoes to sign with Dutch Eredivisie side Roda JC, after performing well at the 1991 All-Africa Games. He was loaned out to Roda's league rivals VVV-Venlo until the end of the season. Babangida made a total of six league appearances, scoring three times in the 1991–92 season. Despite Venlo's relegation to Eerste Divisie, Babangida remained at the club for another year.

Babangida received his breakthrough in the 1992–93 season as he scored 16 goals, helping Venlo to achieve promotion to Eredivisie. The following season, Babangida returned to Roda, immediately becoming a first-team regular with the Kerkrade side. Babangida made a total of 29 league appearances for Roda that season, scoring 11 goals.

Babangida spent two more seasons at Roda JC. Babangida's 10 league goals in 1995–96, made him the club's top scorer that season. In 1995, Babangida made his European debut, scoring a goal in the UEFA Cup first-round win over Olimpija Ljubljana, Roda's first European campaign in five years. Roda went on to beat the Slovenian side 5–2 on aggregate, but lost to Benfica in the second round. Solid performances at both international and club level led to interest from Dutch side Ajax, as Louis van Gaal was looking to replace Babangida's compatriot Finidi George, who had recently departed to Real Betis.

=== Ajax ===
Babangida joined Ajax in the summer of 1996 in a long-anticipated €5 million move. He appeared in 29 league games, scoring four goals in his first season with Ajax. Babangida played an important role in Ajax's European campaign, scoring three goals, including one against Auxerre in the group stages, and the winning goal in the second leg of the UEFA Champions League encounter with Atlético Madrid at the Vicente Calderón Stadium, that put Ajax through to the semi-finals of the competition.

Babangida had a successful second season with the club as he helped Ajax to another Eredivisie title with a 39-point gap over PSV Eindhoven, while his 13 league goals in 26 games made him the club's third top scorer, behind Shota Arveladze and Jari Litmanen. Ajax clinched the second title of the season with a 5–0 victory over PSV in the KNVB Cup final, with the Nigerian scoring the first goal.

Babangida's fortunes started to change towards the end of 1998. Having missed the start of the season with malaria, Babangida gradually lost his starting line-up position as Morten Olsen was looking to improve on the team's inconsistent performances both in the domestic league and in Europe. Babangida started two of his team's opening Champions League games. The European season, however, ended in disappointment as Ajax finished bottom of their group behind Olympiacos, Dinamo Zagreb and Porto. Overall, Babangida appeared in 18 league games for Ajax that season, starting only seven. He didn't feature in the Dutch Cup final where Ajax managed to retain the trophy after beating Fortuna Sittard in the final.

Babangida saw even less playing time after the 1999 season, as he made a mere eight appearances the following year and didn't play a single game in the first half of the 2000–01 season. In an attempt to offload the player, Ajax came to an agreement with the Turkish Süper Lig side Gençlerbirliği, who signed Babangida on a half-year loan deal until the end of the season.

=== Later career ===
The spell in Turkey, however, proved to be an unhappy time for Babangida and the Ankara side chose no to pursue their interest in the player once the loan deal expired. Looking for a move away from Netherlands, Babangida came close to signing with AJ Auxerre, but received a last-minute call from Ronald Koeman and agreed to join him at Vitesse instead. Another loan move followed. First team player under Koeman, Babangida subsequently lost his place in the starting line-up, when Ronald Koeman left for Ajax and was replaced by Edward Sturing.

Babangida signed with Ittihad of Saudi Arabia in September 2002, joining Bebeto and Titi Camara, but walked out of the team in November after disagreements with José Oscar Bernardi. Looking to resolve the deadlock with Ajax, Babangida returned to Amsterdam to continue negotiating a termination of his contract with the club. On 30 April 2003, three years since Babangida played his last game for the club, it was announced that both sides had come to an agreement and the player's contract was finally terminated.

As a free agent, Babangida underwent a successful trial at Chinese side Tianjin TEDA in the summer of 2003. The move, however, was put off due to the outbreak of SARS in China, and Babangida signed with the second-tier side Changchun Yatai shortly after. His four goals in the second part of the season helped his team to the Jia B title and earned him a recall to the national team for their preparations for the 2004 African Cup of Nations. Babangida scored four more goals for Yatai the following season before retiring in 2004.

== International career ==
Babangida received his first call-up to the senior Nigeria national team for a pre-World Cup friendly against Romania in 1994. He then played in a friendly against Georgia, but did not make the final squad for 1994 World Cup.

Babangida's international chances were partly limited due to the fact that he often found himself behind Finidi George in the pecking order. He played an important role in his team's Olympic triumph in Atlanta in 1996, as Nigeria overcame tough resistance from Brazil and Argentina, packed with the likes of Dida, Roberto Carlos, Bebeto, Ronaldo, Rivaldo, Hernán Crespo, Claudio López, Ariel Ortega and Diego Simeone among others. Babangida took part in Nigeria's 1998 World Cup campaign, playing a total of 120 minutes as he started one game and came on as a sub in the other three. He scored his team's only goal in the second-round defeat to Denmark. In January 2001, Babangida appeared in an exhibition game at the Yokohama International Stadium (known as the Nissan Stadium nowadays), playing for FIFA XI in a game against the unified team of Japan and South Korea.

Babangida only made his African Nations Cup debut in 2000 as Nigeria withdrew from the 1996 edition in South Africa due to political reasons and missed out on 1998 African Cup of Nations through disqualification. Babangida scored two spectacular goals against South Africa to put Nigeria through to the final against Cameroon, where they drew 2–2, before being narrowly defeated 3–4 on penalties. He appeared in all of his team's five games, starting two.

He then featured in Nigeria's run to the 2002 World Cup finals, scoring two important first-half goals against Ghana on the final day of the 2002 World Cup qualification, helping Nigeria seal the final African region World Cup berth. Babangida played in all of his team's games at the 2002 Nations Cup, but was dropped ahead of the World Cup, alongside several other experienced players like Sunday Oliseh and Finidi George. He was recalled to the national team for the pre-Nations Cup training camp in Faro, Portugal in 2004, but did not make the final squad, making the 2002 Cup of Nations his last major international tournament.

== Personal life ==
Babangida, sometimes nicknamed "TJ", was born into a large family in the city of Kaduna in 1973. He was married to Rabah (now his ex), the sister of Daniel Amokachi's wife. Two of his nine brothers, Ibrahim and Haruna are also footballers. The former spent five years at Volendam, while the latter became the youngest ever player in the history of Spanish football to have a buy-out clause in his contract and the second youngest player to appear for FC Barcelona, when he made his debut in 1998 as a fifteen-year-old.

In 1997 Babangida acted in a commercial ad for ABN-AMRO in which he points out his hesitations about a contract of some sort. In 2004, Babangida signed a $2 million contract to bring new footballs to Nigeria. The same year, he opened a shopping mall in Kaduna. Upon retiring from professional football, Babangida has been working as a football agent.

In May 2024, Babangida survived a traffic collision in Zaria that killed his one-year old son and younger brother Ibrahim. His wife, Kannywood actress Maryam Waziri, was critically injured.

== Career statistics ==
=== Club ===
Appearances and goals by club, season and competition
Club	Season	League			Cup		Continental		Other		Total	
Club	Season	Division	Apps	Goals	Apps	Goals	Apps	Goals	Apps	Goals	Apps	Goals
Roda JC	1993–94	Eredivisie	29	11	1	0	—		—		30	11
Roda JC	1994–95	Eredivisie	20	5	0	0	—		—		20	5
Roda JC	1995–96	Eredivisie	29	10	3	0	4	1	—		36	11
Roda JC	Total		78	26	4	0	4	1	—		86	27
Ajax	1996–97	Eredivisie	25	4	0	0	10	3	1 (Note: Appearances in Johan Cruyff Shield)	0	36	7
Ajax	1997–98	Eredivisie	26	13	3	1	4	1	—		33	15
Ajax	1998–99	Eredivisie	18	2	2	0	4	0	0	0	24	2
Ajax	1999–2000	Eredivisie	8	1	0	0	1	0	0	0	9	1
Ajax	Total		77	20	5	1	19	4	1	0	102	25
Gençlerbirliği (loan)	2000–01	1.Lig	12	2	3	1	—		—		15	3
Vitesse (loan)	2001–02	Eredivisie	14	1	2	0	—		—		16	1
Career total			181	49	14	2	23	5	1	0	219	56

=== International ===
Appearances and goals by national team and year
National team	Year	Apps	Goals
Nigeria	1994	2	0
Nigeria	1995	0	0
Nigeria	1996	0	0
Nigeria	1997	2	0
Nigeria	1998	7	1
Nigeria	1999	4	0
Nigeria	2000	9	2
Nigeria	2001	7	2
Nigeria	2002	5	0
Total		36	5

Scores and results list Nigeria's goal tally first, score column indicates score after each Babangida goal.

List of international goals scored by Tijani Babangida
No.	Date	Venue	Opponent	Score	Result	Competition
1	28 June 1998	Stade de France, Saint-Denis, France	Denmark	1–4	1–4	1998 World Cup
2	10 February 2000	National Stadium, Lagos, Nigeria	South Africa	1–0	2–0	2000 African Cup of Nations
3	10 February 2000	National Stadium, Lagos, Nigeria	South Africa	2–0	2–0	2000 African Cup of Nations
4	29 July 2001	Liberation Stadium, Port Harcourt, Nigeria	Ghana	2–0	3–0	2002 World Cup qualifier
5	29 July 2001	Liberation Stadium, Port Harcourt, Nigeria	Ghana	3–0	3–0	2002 World Cup qualifier

== Honours ==
- Summer Olympics: 1996
- Eredivisie: 1997–98
- KNVB Cup: 1997–98, 1998–99
- Turkish Cup: 2000–01
- Jia B: 2003
