= Ibrahim Babangida (footballer) =

Nigerian footballer (1976–2024)

Personal information
- Date of birth: 1 August 1976
- Place of birth: Kaduna, Nigeria
- Date of death: 9 May 2024 (aged 47)
- Place of death: Kaduna, Nigeria
- Height: 1.66 m (5 ft 5 in)
- Position: Right winger

Senior career*
Years	Team	Apps	(Gls)
1990–1991	Bank of the North		
1992–1994	Stationery Stores F.C.		
1995–1997	Katsina United		
1997–2002	Volendam	51	(7)

International career
1993	Nigeria U17	4	(1)
Medal record
Men's football
Representing Nigeria
FIFA U-17 World Cup
Gold medal – first place	1993 Japan	Team
- * Club domestic league appearances and goals

Ibrahim Babangida (1 August 1976 – 9 May 2024) was a Nigerian professional footballer who played as a right winger.

== Club career ==
Babangida was born in Kaduna. He played for Bank of the North, Stationery Stores F.C. and Katsina United in his home country and for Dutch club FC Volendam.

== International career ==
Babangida represented the Nigeria national under-17 football team at the 1993 FIFA U-17 World Championship in Japan and was the world champion.

== Personal life and death ==
Babangida was the brother of former Ajax winger Tijani Babangida and former Olympiacos forward Haruna Babangida.

On 9 May 2024, Babangida died after being involved in a traffic collision in Zaria. He was 47. Other occupants, including his elder brother, Tijani, survived the accident.
