= 1994 FIFA World Cup qualification – OFC second round =

This page provides the summaries of the OFC second round matches for 1994 FIFA World Cup qualification.

== Format ==
In this round the two winning teams from the first round were drawn into two home-and-away ties.

The winners advanced to the CONCACAF–OFC play-off.

== Matches ==
30 May 1993

New Zealand	0–1	Australia
		55' Arnold

Mount Smart Stadium, Auckland
Attendance: 10,952
Referee: Bo Karlsson (Sweden)

New Zealand	Australia

6 June 1993

Australia	3–0	New Zealand
Veart 1'; A. Vidmar 3'; Zelic 49'

Olympic Park, Melbourne
Referee: Jacobs Ullenberg (Sweden)

Australia	New Zealand

Australia won 4–0 on aggregate and advanced to the CONCACAF–OFC play-off.
