= Ricardo Ciciliano =

Colombian footballer (1976–2020)

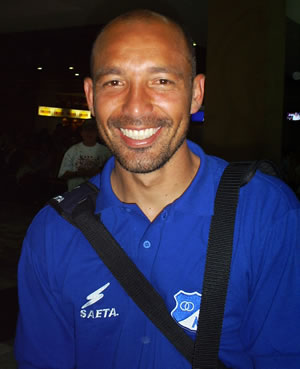

Personal information
- Full name: Ricardo Manuel Ciciliano Bustillo
- Date of birth: September 23, 1976
- Place of birth: Barranquilla, Colombia
- Date of death: September 17, 2020 (aged 43)
- Place of death: Barranquilla, Colombia
- Height: 1.78 m (5 ft 10 in)
- Position: Midfielder

Senior career*
Years	Team	Apps	(Gls)
1993–1995	Deportivo Pereira		
1996–1997	Atlético Bucaramanga		
1998–1999	Deportes Tolima		
2000	Deportivo Pasto		
2000	Deportes Quindío		
2001	Deportes Tolima		
2001	Atlético Junior		
2002–2004	Deportes Tolima		
2005–2006	Deportivo Cali		
2006–2008	Millonarios	65	(16)
2008	Once Caldas	18	(5)
2009	Atlético Junior		
2009	Millonarios	18	(3)
2010–2011	Juan Aurich	58	(17)
2012	Uniautónoma	14	(3)
2012	Atlético Huila	7	(1)

International career
1993	Colombia U17	3	(2)
- * Club domestic league appearances and goals as of April 24, 2013

Ricardo Manuel Ciciliano Bustillo (September 23, 1976 – September 17, 2020) was a Colombian football midfielder.

== Career ==
Ciciliano was born in Barranquilla. From 2006, Ciciliano played at Millonarios where he achieved several remarkable feats. One of these was on November 19, 2006, when Millonarios played against Independiente Medellín; Millonarios was winning the match 1–0 and with 5 minutes remaining for the final whistle, Millonarios goalkeeper Jose Fernando Cuadrado was sent off. Without another goalkeeper available (Juan Carlos Henao was injured), Ciciliano took his place; he eventually saved the penalty kick awarded to Independiente Medellín as result of Cuadrado's foul, and Millos won the match.

Another notable achievement for Ciciliano was on October 24, 2007, when he scored 2 goals against the Brazilian club São Paulo FC, assuring Millonarios qualification for the Semi-finals of the Copa Sudamericana 2007. That same year he won Top Scorer in the Copa Sudamericana 2007 after scoring 6 goals in Millonarios. Ciciliano played for Colombia at the 1993 FIFA U-17 World Championship in Japan.

Ciciliano entered the intensive care unit of Clínica La Asunción in Barranquilla with pneumonia for complications of COVID-19 on September 6, 2020. He died there of his condition on September 17, 2020, at age 43.

== Titles ==
Season	Club	Title
1993	Colombia	U-17 South American Championship
2003	Deportes Tolima	2003-II - Copa Mustang
2005	Deportivo Cali	2005-II - Copa Mustang

=== Individual honours ===
- Top scorer in the Copa Sudamericana 2007 with Millonarios F.C.
