= Micah Cooks =

American soccer player (born 1981)

Personal information
- Date of birth: February 7, 1981 (age 45)
- Place of birth: Washington, D.C., U.S.
- Height: 6 ft 0 in (1.83 m)
- Positions: Midfielder; forward

Youth career
- FC DELCO

Senior career*
Years	Team	Apps	(Gls)
2000–2001	D.C. United	6	(0)
2000	→ MLS Pro-40 (loan)	13	(0)
2001	Northern Virginia Royals	7	(0)
Total		26	(0)
- * Club domestic league appearances and goals

Micah Cooks (born February 7, 1981) is an American former soccer player who played for D.C. United in the MLS. He is the younger brother of fellow professional soccer player Judah Cooks.

== Career statistics ==
=== Club ===
Club	Season	League			Cup		Other		Total	
Club	Season	Division	Apps	Goals	Apps	Goals	Apps	Goals	Apps	Goals
D.C. United	2000	MLS	5	0	0	0	0	0	5	0
D.C. United	2001	MLS	1	0	0	0	0	0	1	0
D.C. United	Total		6	0	0	0	0	0	6	0
MLS Pro-40 (loan)	2000	USL A-League	13	0	0	0	0	0	13	0
Northern Virginia Royals	2001	USISL D-3 Pro League	7	0	0	0	0	0	7	0
Career total			26	0	0	0	0	0	26	0
