= Pamela Díaz =

Chilean model (born 1981)

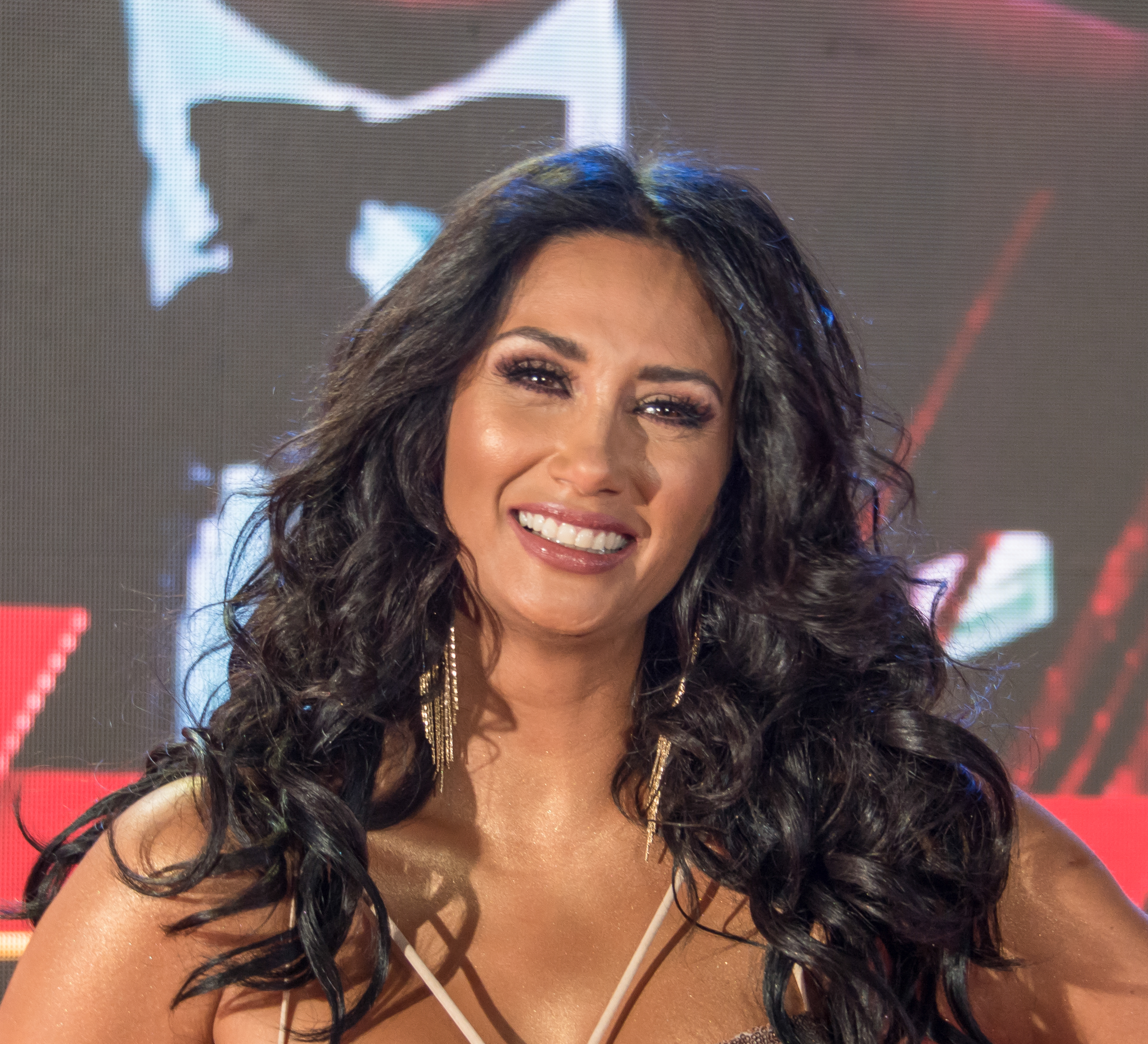
- Born: Pamela Andrea Díaz Saldías; 26 February 1981 (age 45); Santiago, Chile
- Other name: La Fiera
- Occupations: Model and Media Celebrity
- Years active: 1996-Present
- Spouses: Manuel Neira (m. 2006; div. 2008) Fernando Téllez (m. 2017; div. 2019)
- Partners: Manuel Neira (1998-2006); Rodrigo Wainright (2008-2012); Pedro Bastidas (2015); Fernando Téllez (2015-2019); Jean Philippe Cretton (2019-2023); Felipe Kast (2024-present)
- Children: Trinidad Neira; Mateo Neira; Pascuala Téllez
- Parents: Alfredo Díaz (father); Lupe Saldías (mother)

Pamela Andrea Díaz Saldías (born in Santiago, Chile, 26 February 1981), also known as "La Fiera" (The Beast), is a Chilean model and media celebrity who is active in Chilean show business.

== Media career ==
Pamela Díaz began her television career participating on a beauty pageant in the show Venga Conmigo of Canal 13, hosted by singer José Alfredo Fuentes in 1996. In 1999 she gained fame in the Miss Mundo Chile beauty pageant where she came in second place behind Lissette Sierra. A year earlier she had participated in the Miss 17 pageant. While she did not win Miss Mundo Chile, it did help launch her career in television where she formed part of the youth program Mekano until 2000.

From this, Díaz would be very popular in Chilean television, especially for her role in an advertising campaign for Morenita brand beer. She also began performing in bikini photo shoots for magazines and Internet portals. She also ventured into television as a model in the Vina del Mar festival program La Movida del Festival from Canal 13.

On 10 May 2005, Díaz, along with 13 other participants, joined the Canal 13 reality show La Granja VIP, where she would live more than three months caring for the animals and harvesting her own food. During the first week, she had fights with fellow participants dancer Kathy Barriga, actress Sandra O'Ryan and Ukrainian teacher Viktoriya Leonenko. Because of this, the Chilean press christened her "La Fiera Vip" (The Beast VIP). Díaz was the first person eliminated after losing in a competition to Santiago Sánchez, but re-entered the program during the fourth week of "playoff" only to be immediately eliminated by Kathy Barriga.

After the reality show, Díaz participated during some weeks in a segment of the morning program of Canal 13 Viva la Mañana as commentator of La Granja VIP. Later, she was hired by Chilevisión to be a panelist of the entertainment and celebrity program Sálvese Quien Pueda (SQP). It was on this program where Diaz became infamous for being part of television scandals which fueled many publications of the national tabloid press.

Her exit was sealed in 2006 after she had a fight with the producer of the program, Natalia Freire. However, despite offers from other channels to book her in their programs, Díaz continued to work for Chilevisión, but in the Spotlight program, which was featured in a "docu-reality" series called Diary of a Bride, which showed all the preparations for her wedding to Manuel Neira, from the manufacture of designer clothing by the Chilean Miguel Angel Guzman to waltz classes. On 15 December 2006, the marriage took place in the church of Santa Gemita and was broadcast live and direct to Chile.

Pamela Diaz became more known abroad when she participated in a fashion show in Germany during the World Cup 2006, where she shared the catwalk with other major international models, who were also pairs of players, such as Alena Seredova and Raica Oliveira.

In April 2009, she returned to television through Telecanal with just them, a program that was broadcast Monday through Friday and chatted about issues of interest to the female public. Because of her comments on that space, often appeared in the "Top Five" of CQC.

Later on Canal 13 she was contacted to participate in the new reality 1910, but she dismissed the offer due to economic issues and other work commitments. However, Channel 13 increased the amount of money and it is thus enters the reality for just 20 days, and who had a contract with Telecanal.

In 2010, she was, during the summer, as a commentator on Canal 13's morning shows live the morning and as host of a souvenir program of the Festival of Viña del Mar Viña called freaks with Sebastian Jiménez. Later, she came to Mega to pair with Patricia Maldonado in the entertainment section of the morning to meet you. She was also a panelist of Look who's talking.

In 2012, she became one of the participants of the TV show Fiebre de Baile Famosos en Peligro and also the new winner with the support of her so-called "People" that will give 57% of the votes.

Díaz is currently a panelist of the program of showbiz and entertainment by the channel Mega Secreto a Voces.

She's also currently participating from the reality show Tierra Brava from Canal 13.

Reality shows
Year	Title		Role	Notes
2005	(Chile)	La Granja VIP	Contestant of the Orange Team	1st eliminated
2005	(Chile)	La Granja VIP	Contestant of the Green Team	4th eliminated
2008	(Chile)	Estrellas en el hielo: El baile	Contestant	3rd place
2009	(Chile)	1910	Contestant of the Centenario Team	Abandoned
2012	(Chile)	Fiebre de baile V	Contestant	Winner / ~~Semifinalist~~
2012	(Chile)	Pareja perfecta	Contestant	9th eliminated
2022	(Chile)	El discípulo del chef	Contestant of the Ennio Carota Team.	18th eliminated
2022	(Chile)	Aqui se baila: Talento vs. fama	Contestant	Abandoned
2023-2024	(Chile)	Tierra brava, Cosechas lo que siembras	Contestant	19th / 9th eliminated
