= Daniel Addo (footballer, born 1976) =

Ghanaian footballer

Dan Addo
Personal information
- Full name: Daniel Addo
- Date of birth: 6 November 1976 (age 49)
- Place of birth: Accra, Ghana
- Position: Midfielder

Youth career
- 1991–1993: Great Olympics
- 1993–1995: Bayer Leverkusen

Senior career*
Years	Team	Apps	(Gls)
1995–1998	Bayer Leverkusen	0	(0)
1998–1999	Fortuna Düsseldorf	27	(2)
1999–2000	Karlsruher SC	17	(0)
2000–2001	Fortuna Düsseldorf	2	(0)
2001–2002	Wormatia Worms	18	(1)
2002–2003	FC Lustenau		
2003–2004	Al-Nejmeh SC	12	(2)
2005–2007	Vardar Skopje		
2007	Sekondi Hasaacas	3	(0)

International career
1991–1993	Ghana U17	11	(3)
1993	Ghana U20	6	(1)
1994–2000	Ghana	27	(2)
Medal record
Representing Ghana
FIFA U-17 World Cup
Winner	Italy 1991	U-17 Team
- * Club domestic league appearances and goals

Daniel Addo (born 6 November 1976) is a Ghanaian former professional footballer who last played for King Faisal Babes as a midfielder.

== Club career ==
Addo enjoyed a ten-year career in Europe, and was hailed as one of the most talented players from Ghana in teenage years. Bayer Leverkusen signed him in 1992 (he was only 15), alongside teammate Sebastian Barnes. However, he never appeared for Bayer's first team, going on to represent Fortuna Düsseldorf (twice), Karlsruher SC, Wormatia Worms, FC Lustenau, Vardar Skopje, Sekondi Hasaacas F.C.

== International career ==
In his international career, Addo was both a member of the Black Stars and the Black Meteors. He played for Ghana's U-17 at the 1991 FIFA U-17 World Championship in Italy, also appearing in the 1993 edition, in Japan. With the under-20, he played at the 1993 FIFA World Youth Championship in Australia.

== Career statistics ==
=== International ===
Scores and results list Ghana's goal tally first, score column indicates score after each Addo goal.

List of international goals scored by Daniel Addo
No.	Date	Venue	Opponent	Score	Result	Competition
1	16 October 1996	Stade Général Seyni Kountché, Niamey, Niger	Niger	4–1	5–1	1996 Africa Cup of Nations qualification
2	23 April 2000	Accra Sports Stadium, Accra, Ghana	Tanzania	3–2	3–2	2002 FIFA World Cup qualification

== Honours ==
Ghana U17

- FIFA U-17 World Cup: 1991
