= 1994 FIFA World Cup qualification =

Tournament details
- Dates: 21 March 1992 – 17 November 1993
- Teams: 147 (from 6 confederations)

Tournament statistics
- Matches played: 497
- Goals scored: 1,446 (2.91 per match)
- Top scorer(s): (Japan) Kazuyoshi Miura (13 goals)

The 1994 FIFA World Cup qualification was a series of tournaments organised by the six FIFA confederations. The 1994 FIFA World Cup featured 24 teams with one place reserved for the host nation, United States, and one place for the defending champions, Germany. The remaining 22 places were determined by a qualification process, in which 147 teams, from the six FIFA confederations, competed. Most of the successful teams were determined within these confederations, with a limited number of inter-confederation play-offs occurring at the end of the process.

Fifteen teams withdrew: Liechtenstein, Cuba, Gambia, Burkina Faso, Liberia, Malawi, Mali, Mauritania, São Tomé and Príncipe, Sierra Leone, Sudan, Tanzania, Uganda, Myanmar and Western Samoa, and three teams were excluded: Yugoslavia and Libya due to UN sanctions, and Chile for the El Maracanazo cheating incident during 1990 qualification.

A total of 130 teams played at least one qualifying match. A total of 497 qualifying matches were played, and 1446 goals were scored (an average of 2.91 per match).

The first qualification match, between Dominican Republic and Puerto Rico, was played on 21 March 1992, and the Puerto Rican forward Marcos Lugris scored the first goal in qualification. Qualification ended on 17 November 1993, when European qualification ended and the OFC–CONMEBOL play-off match was played. Eighteen of FIFA's twenty-four top-ranked countries eventually qualified.

== Qualified teams ==
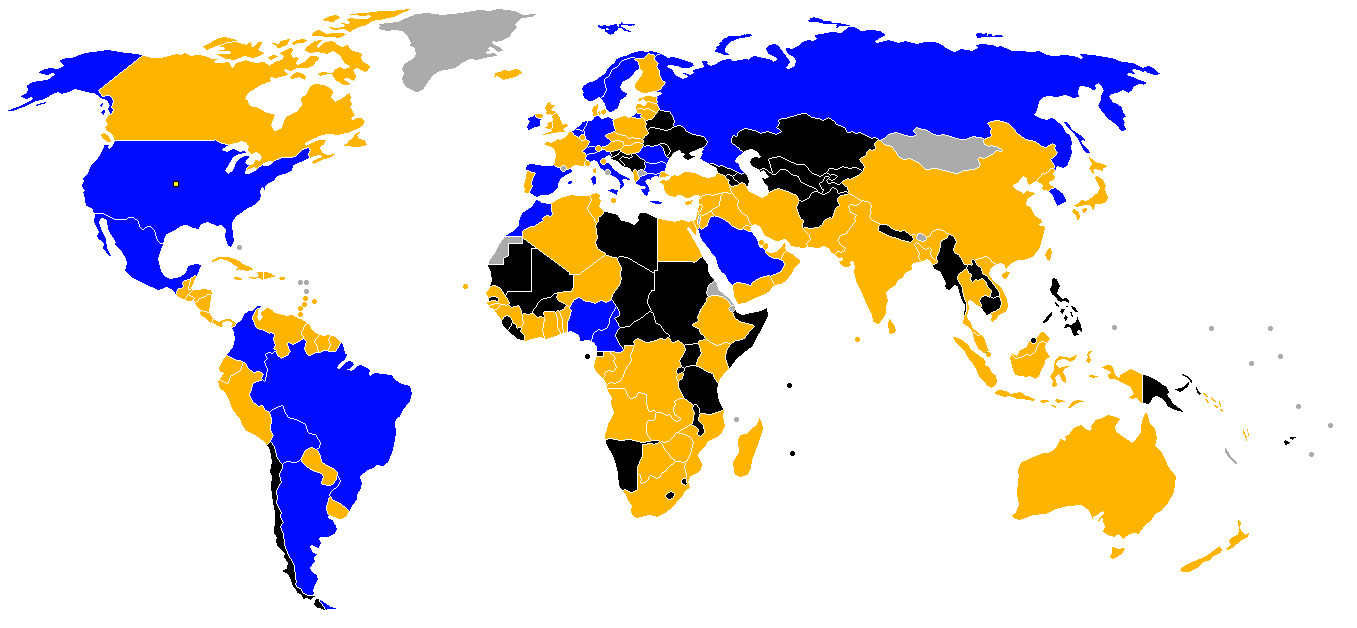
Country qualified for World Cup Country failed to qualify Country did not enter World Cup Country not a FIFA member

Team	Method of qualification	Date of qualification	Finals appearance	Streak	Previous best performance	FIFA Ranking (Note: The rankings are shown as of 19 November 1993. These are the rankings used for the final draw.)
United States	Hosts	4 July 1988	5th	2	Third place (1930)	27
Germany	Defending champions	8 July 1990	13th (Note: This is the 3rd appearance of Germany at the FIFA World Cup. However, FIFA considers West Germany's results as Germany's.)	11	Winners (1954, 1974, 1990) (Note: Germany's best result is third place in 1934. However, FIFA considers West Germany's results as Germany's.)	3
Mexico	CONCACAF Final Round winners	9 May 1993	10th	1 (Last: 1986)	Quarter-finals (1970, 1986)	17
Greece	UEFA Group 5 winners	23 May 1993	1st	1	—	32
Russia	UEFA Group 5 runners-up	2 June 1993	8th (Note: This is the 1st appearance of Russia at the FIFA World Cup. However, FIFA considers Russia as the successor team of the USSR.)	4	Fourth place (1966)	14
Colombia	CONMEBOL Group A winners	5 September 1993	3rd	2	Round of 16 (1990)	21
Bolivia	CONMEBOL Group B runners-up	19 September 1993	3rd	1 (Last: 1950)	Group stage (1930, 1950)	59
Brazil	CONMEBOL Group B winners	19 September 1993	15th	15	Winners (1958, 1962, 1970)	4
Nigeria	CAF Final Round Group A winners	8 October 1993	1st	1	—	16
Cameroon	CAF Final Round Group C winners	10 October 1993	3rd	2	Quarter-finals (1990)	24
Morocco	CAF Final Round Group B winners	10 October 1993	3rd	1 (Last: 1986)	Round of 16 (1986)	30
Norway	UEFA Group 2 winners	13 October 1993	2nd	1 (Last: 1938)	Round of 16 (1938)	5
Sweden	UEFA Group 6 winners	13 October 1993	9th	2	Runners-up (1958)	11
South Korea	AFC Final Round runners-up	28 October 1993	4th	3	Group stage (1954, 1986, 1990)	39
Saudi Arabia	AFC Final Round winners	28 October 1993	1st	1	—	38
Belgium	UEFA Group 4 runners-up	17 November 1993	9th	4	Fourth place (1986)	22
Bulgaria	UEFA Group 6 runners-up	17 November 1993	6th	1 (Last: 1986)	Round of 16 (1986)	23
Italy	UEFA Group 1 winners	17 November 1993	13th	9	Winners (1934, 1938, 1982)	1
Netherlands	UEFA Group 2 runners-up	17 November 1993	6th	2	Runners-up (1974, 1978)	2
Republic of Ireland	UEFA Group 3 runners-up	17 November 1993	2nd	2	Quarter finals (1990)	13
Romania	UEFA Group 4 winners	17 November 1993	6th	2	Round of 16 (1934, 1938, 1990)	12
Spain	UEFA Group 3 winners	17 November 1993	9th	5	Fourth place (1950)	7
Switzerland	UEFA Group 1 runners-up	17 November 1993	7th	1 (Last: 1966)	Quarter-finals (1934, 1938, 1954)	9
Argentina	Inter-confederation play-off winners	17 November 1993	11th	6	Winners (1978, 1986)	9

== Qualification process ==
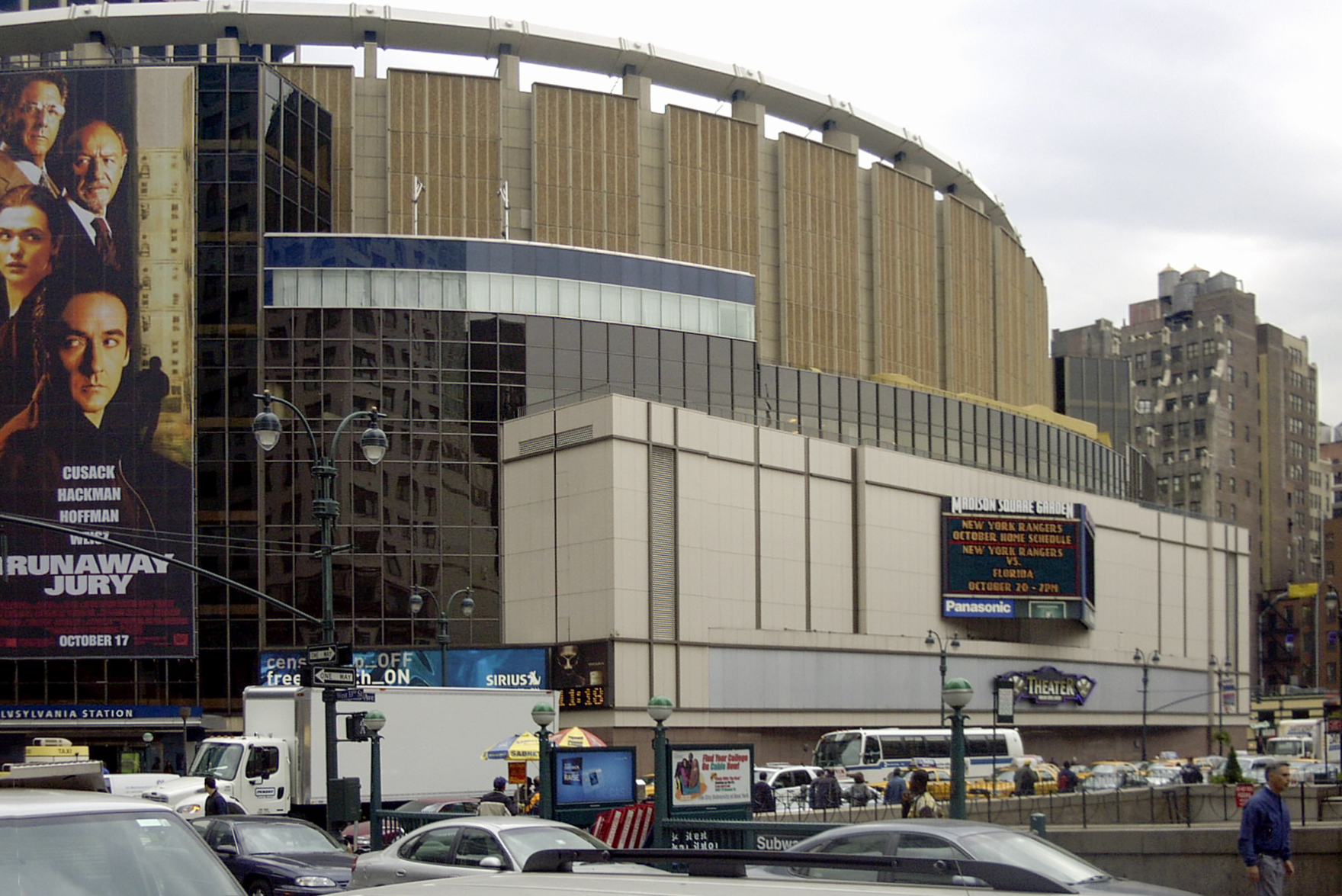
Madison Square Garden in New York City hosted the qualification draw

The draw was made in New York on 8 December 1991 at Madison Square Garden.

For the first time, three teams qualified from the African zone, because of its performance in the previous tournament. The 24 spots available in the 1994 World Cup were distributed among the continental zones as follows:

- Europe (UEFA): 13 places. 1 of them went to automatic qualifier Germany, while the other 12 places were contested by 38 teams (including Israel).
- South America (CONMEBOL): 3.5 places, contested by 9 teams.
- North, Central America and Caribbean (CONCACAF): 2.25 places, 1 of them went to automatic qualifier United States, while the other 1.25 places were contested by 22 teams.
- Africa (CAF): 3 places, contested by 40 teams.
- Asia (AFC): 2 places, contested by 29 teams.
- Oceania (OFC): 0.25 places, contested by 7 teams.

UEFA, AFC and CAF have a guaranteed number of places, whereas the number of qualifiers from other confederations is dependent on play-offs between OFC's first-placed team and CONCACAF's second-placed team and the winner of this fixture against CONMEBOL's fourth-placed team.

After the first round of 1994 FIFA World Cup finals, the percentage of teams from each confederation that passed through to the round of 16 was as follows:

- AFC (Asia): 50% (1 of 2 places)
- CAF (Africa): 33% (1 of 3 places)
- CONCACAF (North, Central American and Caribbean): 100% (2 of 2 places)
- CONMEBOL (South America): 50% (2 of 4 places)
- OFC (Oceania): n/a (0 of 0 places)
- UEFA (Europe): 77% (10 of 13 places)

=== Summary of qualification ===
Confederation	Teams started	Teams that secured qualification	Teams that were eliminated	Total places in finals	Qualifying start date	Qualifying end date
AFC	29	2	27	2	8 April 1993	28 October 1993
CAF	40	3	37	3	9 October 1992	10 October 1993
CONCACAF	22+1	1+1	21	1+1	21 March 1992	15 August 1993
CONMEBOL	9	4	5	4	18 July 1993	17 November 1993
OFC	7	0	7	0	7 June 1992	17 November 1993
UEFA (Note: Israel did not become a full member of UEFA until 1994, but competed in European qualification in the run-up to membership.)	38+1	12+1	26	12+1	22 April 1992	17 November 1993
Total	145+2	22+2	123	22+2	21 March 1992	17 November 1993

=== Tiebreakers ===
For FIFA World Cup qualifying stages using a league format, the method used for separating teams level on points is the same for all Confederations. If teams are even on points at the end of group play, the tied teams will be ranked by:

1. goal difference in all group matches
2. greater number of goals scored in all group matches

For FIFA World Cup qualifying stages using a home-and-away knockout format, the team that has the higher aggregate score over the two legs progresses to the next round. In the event that aggregate scores finish level, the away goals rule is applied, i.e. the team that scored more goals away from home over the two legs progresses. If away goals are also equal, then thirty minutes of extra time are played, divided into two fifteen-minutes halves. The away goals rule is again applied after extra time, i.e. if there are goals scored during extra time and the aggregate score is still level, the visiting team qualifies by virtue of more away goals scored. If no goals are scored during extra time, the tie is decided by penalty shoot-out.

== Confederation qualification ==
=== AFC ===
Qualification for AFC teams consisted of two rounds. Round one saw the teams divided into 6 groups, each team playing the others in their group twice. The winner of each group then went into a final group where they played each other once.

The qualification process began with 29 national teams vying for two spots. Saudi Arabia and Korea Republic qualified.

Legend
Countries that directly qualified for the 1994 World Cup

==== Final positions (final round) ====
Rank	Team	Pld	Pts
1	Saudi Arabia	5	7
2	South Korea	5	6
3	Japan	5	6
4	Iraq	5	5
5	Iran	5	4
6	North Korea	5	2

=== CAF ===
Qualification for CAF teams also consisted of two rounds. Round one saw the teams divided into 9 groups, each team playing the others in their group twice. The winners of these groups then went into three final groups where they played each other twice.

The qualification process began with 40 national teams vying for three spots. Nigeria, Morocco and Cameroon qualified.

Legend
Countries that directly qualified for the 1994 World Cup

==== Final positions (final round) ====
Group A

Team	Pld	Pts
Nigeria	4	5
Ivory Coast	4	5
Algeria	4	2

Group B

Team	Pld	Pts
Morocco	4	6
Zambia	4	5
Senegal	4	1

Group C

Team	Pld	Pts
Cameroon	4	6
Zimbabwe	4	4
Guinea	4	2

=== CONCACAF ===
There were three rounds of play for CONCACAF teams. Mexico and Canada received byes and advanced to the second round directly. The remaining teams were divided into Caribbean and Central American zones. In the Caribbean zone, 14 teams played in knockout matches on a home-and-away basis to determine three winners advancing to the second round. In the Central American zone, the six teams were paired up to play knockout matches on a home-and-away basis. The winners advanced to the second round.

In the second round, the eight teams were divided into two groups of four teams each. They played against each other on a home-and-away basis. The group winners and runners-up advanced to the final round.

In the final round, the four teams played against each other on a home-and-away basis. The group winner qualified. The runner-up advanced to the CONCACAF–OFC intercontinental play-off. Mexico took the guaranteed spot and Canada qualified for the play-off.

Legend
Countries that directly qualified for the 1994 World Cup
Countries that advanced to the CONCACAF–OFC play-off

==== Final positions (final round) ====
Rank	Team	Pld	Pts
1	Mexico	6	10
2	Canada	6	7
3	El Salvador	6	4
4	Honduras	6	3

=== CONMEBOL ===
Nine CONMEBOL teams entered the competition (Chile was banned by FIFA due to the 1989 El Maracanazo). The nine teams were divided into two groups. The teams played against each other on a home-and-away basis. Group A had one guaranteed place and one play-off spot, while Group B had two spots for the finals. Colombia, Brazil and Bolivia qualified automatically and Argentina qualified for the play-off.

Legend
Countries that directly qualified for the 1994 World Cup
Countries that advanced to the CONCACAF/OFC–CONMEBOL play-off

==== Final positions (group stage) ====
Group A

Team	Pld	Pts
Colombia	6	10
Argentina	6	7
Paraguay	6	6
Peru	6	1

Group B

Team	Pld	Pts
Brazil	8	12
Bolivia	8	11
Uruguay	8	10
Ecuador	8	5
Venezuela	8	2

=== OFC ===
Qualification for OFC teams consisted of two rounds. Seven teams entered initially and were divided into two groups, but Western Samoa withdrew. The two group winners then played against each other on a home-and-away basis. The winner advanced to the CONCACAF–OFC intercontinental play-off. Australia won the tie and advanced.

==== Second round ====
Team 1	Agg.	Team 2	1st leg	2nd leg
New Zealand	0–4	Australia	0–1	0–3

=== UEFA ===
38 were initially involved in UEFA qualifying, but Liechtenstein withdrew and Yugoslavia was suspended.

The thirty-six teams were divided into six groups: five groups of six teams each (before Yugoslavia was suspended leaving their group with five teams) and one group of seven teams. The teams played against each other on a home-and-away basis. The group winners and runners-up qualified.

Italy, Switzerland, Norway, Netherlands, Spain, Ireland, Romania, Belgium, Greece, Russia, Sweden, and Bulgaria all qualified.

Legend
Countries that directly qualified for the 1994 World Cup

==== Final positions (group stage) ====
Group 1
Team	Pld	Pts
Italy	10	16
Switzerland	10	15
Portugal	10	14
Scotland	10	11
Malta	10	3
Estonia	10	1

Group 2
Team	Pld	Pts
Norway	10	16
Netherlands	10	15
England	10	13
Poland	10	8
Turkey	10	7
San Marino	10	1

Group 3
Team	Pld	Pts
Spain	12	19
Republic of Ireland	12	18
Denmark	12	18
Northern Ireland	12	13
Lithuania	12	7
Latvia	12	5
Albania	12	4

Group 4
Team	Pld	Pts
Romania	10	15
Belgium	10	15
RCS	10	13
Wales	10	12
Cyprus	10	5
Faroe Islands	10	0

Group 5
Team	Pld	Pts
Greece	8	14
Russia	8	12
Iceland	8	8
Hungary	8	5
Luxembourg	8	1
FR Yugoslavia	0	0

Group 6
Team	Pld	Pts
Sweden	10	15
Bulgaria	10	14
France	10	13
Austria	10	8
Finland	10	5
Israel	10	5

== Inter-confederation play-offs ==
For the first time ever, there were two rounds of play in the inter-confederation play-offs. The teams from CONCACAF and OFC first played each other on a home-and-away basis. The winner then played against the team from CONMEBOL on a home-and-away basis. The winner qualified.

=== Bracket ===
First round
Canada	2	1	3 (1)
Australia (p)	1	2	3 (4)

Second round
Australia	1	0	1
Argentina	1	1	2

=== First round: CONCACAF v OFC ===
Team 1	Agg.	Team 2	1st leg	2nd leg
Canada	3–3 (1–4 p)	Australia	2–1	1–2 (a.e.t.)

=== Second round: OFC v CONMEBOL ===
Team 1	Agg.	Team 2	1st leg	2nd leg
Australia	1–2	Argentina	1–1	0–1

== Top goalscorers ==
13 goals

- (Japan) Kazuyoshi Miura

9 goals

- (Romania) Florin Răducioiu

8 goals

- (Iraq) Alaa Kadhim
- (Nigeria) Rashidi Yekini
- (South Korea) Ha Seok-ju
- (Thailand) Piyapong Pue-On
- (Wales) Ian Rush
