= 1994 FIFA World Cup qualification (OFC–CONMEBOL play-off) =

1994 FIFA World Cup qualification (CONMEBOL–OFC play-off)
- Event: 1994 FIFA World Cup qualification
Australia	Argentina
(Australia)	(Argentina)
1	2
- (on aggregate)

First leg
Australia	Argentina
1	1
- Date: 31 October 1993
- Venue: Football Stadium, Sydney
- Referee: Sándor Puhl (Hungary)
- Attendance: 43,967

Second leg
Argentina	Australia
1	0
- Date: 17 November 1993
- Venue: Monumental, Buenos Aires
- Referee: Peter Mikkelsen (Denmark)
- Attendance: 67,000

The 1994 FIFA World Cup OFC–CONMEBOL qualification play-off was a two-legged home-and-away tie between the winners of the Oceania qualifying tournament and CONCACAF–OFC play-off winners, Australia, and the second-placed team from the CONMEBOL Group 1, Argentina.

== Overview ==
The games were played on 31 October and 17 November 1993 in Sydney and Buenos Aires respectively. Australia was hoping to play in the FIFA World Cup for the first time since 1974, and Argentina was hoping to qualify after reaching the FIFA World Cup Final three times in the previous four FIFA World Cups. The only time that Argentina failed to qualify for a FIFA World Cup was in 1970. This qualification play-off notably immediately followed Argentina's 5–0 defeat by Colombia at home in Buenos Aires on 5 September 1993. The crowd of 43,967 who watched the first leg played at the Sydney Football Stadium was at the time a stadium record crowd for any sporting event.

The series were notable for being the first time Argentina had to play a qualification play-off match in their history. Moreover, the series saw the return of Diego Maradona to the national team after a long dispute with manager Alfio Basile. Some years later, Maradona suggested that drug tests were deliberately avoided during the series, stating that "to play against Australia, the Association gave us a 'fast coffee'" to drink before the match.

== Background ==
Argentina
Round
Australia

Team	Pld	W	D	L	GF	GA	GD	Pts
Colombia	6	4	2	0	13	2	11	10
Argentina	6	3	1	2	7	9	−2	7
Paraguay	6	1	4	1	6	7	−1	6
Peru	6	0	1	5	4	12	−8	1

Final standings

Team	Pld	W	D	L	GF	GA	GD	Pts
Australia	4	4	0	0	13	2	11	8
Tahiti	4	1	1	2	5	8	−3	3
Solomon Islands	4	0	1	3	5	13	−8	1

Final round
(OFC)
Opponent
Result

1st leg
New Zealand (A)
1–0

2nd leg
New Zealand (H)
3–0

1st play-off
Opponent
Result

1st leg
Canada (A)
1–2

2nd leg
Canada (H)
2–1 (4–1 PSO)

== Match details ==
=== First leg ===
1994 FIFA World Cup qualification playoff
31 October 1993
20:10 UTC+11
First leg

Australia	1–1	Argentina
A. Vidmar 42'	Report	37' Balbo

Football Stadium, Sydney
Attendance: 43,697
Referee: Sándor Puhl (Hungary)

Australia	Argentina

GK	1	Mark Bosnich
DF	19	Tony Vidmar		(substituted off) 72'
DF	13	Mehmet Durakovic
DF	12	Milan Ivanovic
DF	5	Alex Tobin
MF	4	Ned Zelic
MF	8	Aurelio Vidmar
MF	6	Paul Wade (c)
MF	11	Robbie Slater	Yellow card
MF	10	Jason van Blerk
FW	9	Graham Arnold
Substitutes:
FW	7	Dave Mitchell		(substituted on) 72'	Yellow card
Manager:
(Scotland) Eddie Thomson

GK	1	Sergio Goycoechea
SW	2	Jorge Borelli
DF	6	Sergio Vázquez
DF	14	José Chamot
DF	3	Carlos Mac Allister	Yellow card
MF	15	Hugo Pérez	Yellow card
MF	5	Fernando Redondo
MF	8	José Basualdo		(substituted off) 70'
MF	10	Diego Maradona (c)	Yellow card
FW	18	Abel Balbo		(substituted off) 89'
FW	9	Gabriel Batistuta
Substitutes:
MF	17	Gustavo Zapata		(substituted on) 70'
DF	13	Fernando Cáceres		(substituted on) 89'
Manager:
(Argentina) Alfio Basile

=== Second leg ===
17 November 1993
21:15 UTC−3
Second leg

Argentina	1–0	Australia
Tobin 59' (o.g.) (Note: Other sources attribute this goal as scored by Gabriel Batistuta)

Estadio Monumental, Buenos Aires
Attendance: 59,768
Referee: Peter Mikkelsen (Denmark)

Argentina	Australia

GK	1	Sergio Goycoechea
DF	14	José Chamot
DF	2	Sergio Vázquez	Yellow card
DF	6	Oscar Ruggeri	Yellow card
DF	3	Carlos Mac Allister
MF	5	Fernando Redondo
MF	15	Hugo Pérez
MF	8	Diego Simeone	Yellow card
MF	10	Diego Maradona (c)
FW	18	Abel Balbo		(substituted off) 70'
FW	9	Gabriel Batistuta
Substitutes:
MF	20	Gustavo Zapata		(substituted on) 70'
Manager:
(Argentina) Alfio Basile

GK	20	Robert Zabica
DF	12	Milan Ivanovic	Yellow card
DF	5	Alex Tobin
DF	19	Tony Vidmar		(substituted off) 64'
DF	13	Mehmet Durakovic	Yellow card
MF	11	Robbie Slater
MF	10	Jason Van Blerk
MF	6	Paul Wade (c)
MF	8	Aurelio Vidmar	Yellow card
FW	7	Graham Arnold
FW	9	Frank Farina
Substitutes:
FW	17	Carl Veart		(substituted on) 64'
Manager:
(Scotland) Eddie Thomson

== Broadcasting rights ==
- Australia: SBS
- Argentina: Canal 9, NexTV! & TeleRed (Only first leg are broadcast live); Eltrece, Canal 30 & Nuevo Siglo Cable TV (Only second leg are broadcast live)
- United Kingdom and the Republic of Ireland: Sky Sports
- United States: ESPN (English) and Telemundo (Spanish)
