= Andrés Grande =

Argentine footballer (born 1976)

Personal information
- Full name: Andrés Miguel Grande
- Date of birth: 29 October 1976 (age 50)
- Place of birth: San Martín, Argentina
- Height: 1.72 m (5 ft 8 in)
- Position: Midfielder

Senior career*
Years	Team	Apps	(Gls)
–1998	Argentinos Juniors	24	(0)
1997	→ Las Palmas (loan)	2	(0)
1998–1999	Bastia	1	(0)
2000–2001	Ferro (Argentina)	24	(0)
2001–2002	Gueugnon	11	(2)
2002–2004	Belluno		
2006	Deportivo Quito		
2007–2008	Carpi		
2008–2009	Belluno		
2009–2010	Trento		
2011	Deportivo Español	5	(0)
- * Club domestic league appearances and goals

Andrés Miguel Grande (born 29 October 1976) is an Argentine former footballer who played as a midfielder.

== Club career ==
Before the second half of 1996–97, Grande was sent on loan to Spanish second-tier side Las Palmas, where he made two league appearances. On 18 January 1997, he debuted for Las Palmas during a 2–1 loss to Toledo. In 1998, he signed for Bastia in the French Ligue 1. In 2000, Grande signed for Argentine top-flight club Ferro Carril Oeste, where he suffered a torn meniscus and consecutive relegations to the Argentine third tier.

In 2001, he signed for Gueugnon in the French second tier but left due to a passport problem. In 2002, Grande signed for Italian fourth-tier team Belluno, helping them earn promotion to the Italian third tier. Before the 2006 season, he signed for Deportivo Quito in Ecuador. In 2007, he signed for Italian fourth-tier outfit Belluno. In 2009, Grande signed for Trento in the Italian fifth tier. In 2011, he signed for Argentine side Deportivo Español.

== International career ==
Grande represented the Argentina U17 national team at the 1993 FIFA U-17 World Championship, helping them win it.
