= Petr Ruman =

Czech footballer

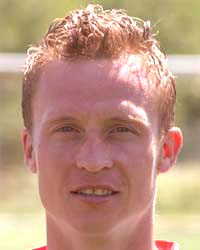
- Ruman with Mainz 05 in 2006

Personal information
- Date of birth: 2 November 1976 (age 49)
- Place of birth: Přerov, Czechoslovakia
- Height: 1.83 m (6 ft 0 in)
- Position: Striker

Youth career
- 1983–1991: PSP Přerov
- 1991–1995: Fotbal Frýdek-Místek

Senior career*
Years	Team	Apps	(Gls)
1995–1996	Baník Ostrava	38	(6)
1997	→ Fotbal Frýdek-Místek		
1998–1999	Baník Ostrava	34	(7)
1999–2005	Greuther Fürth	169	(38)
2005–2008	Mainz 05	47	(7)
2009	VfR Aalen	5	(0)
Total		293	(58)

International career
1993–1994	Czech Republic U18	4	(1)
1996	Czech Republic U21	1	(0)

Managerial career
- 2018–2020: Greuther Fürth (assistant)
- 2018–2021: Greuther Fürth II
- 2021: Türkgücü München
- 2022–2024: Greuther Fürth II
- 2025: Žilina
- * Club domestic league appearances and goals

Petr Ruman (born 2 November 1976) is a Czech former professional footballer.

== Career ==
In the first competitive match for 1. FSV Mainz 05 in the 2005–06 season, Ruman scored the first goal of the UEFA Cup qualification match first leg against Mika Ashtarak, the final score being 4–0. This goal made him the first player to score a goal for Mainz in an international competition.

He coached Türkgücü München from the 2021–22 season on but was sacked after just three months.

On 2 June 2025, Ruman was appointed as the manager of Slovak First Football League club Žilina.
