= Miroslav Rada =

Czech footballer

Personal information
- Full name: Miroslav Rada
- Date of birth: 6 August 1976 (age 50)
- Place of birth: Ústí nad Labem, Czechoslovakia
- Position: Defender

Youth career
- Ústí nad Labem
- Sparta Prague

Senior career*
Years	Team	Apps	(Gls)
1995–1997	Sparta Prague	8	(0)
1997–2003	Teplice	113	(3)
2003–2004	Ústí nad Labem		
2004–2005	Vasas	5	(0)

International career
1994	Czech Republic U17	3	(0)
1994	Czech Republic U18	3	(0)
1997	Czech Republic U21	1	(0)
- * Club domestic league appearances and goals

Miroslav Rada (born 6 August 1976) is a Czech former professional footballer who played as a defender. He played in his native Czech Republic for Sparta Prague and FK Teplice, appearing in the Czech First League more than 100 times. Rada joined Hungarian side Zalaegerszegi in 2003, but after failing to agree contract terms, he returned to play in the Czech Republic, signing for Ústí nad Labem in the Bohemian Football League in August 2003. After playing lower league football in Germany, he again returned to the Czech Republic, playing for Sokol Brozany in the Czech Fourth Division in 2010. He was the captain of the side.
