= Peter Anosike =

Nigerian footballer (born 1976)

Personal information
- Full name: Peter Ikechukwu Anosike
- Date of birth: 24 December 1976 (age 49)
- Place of birth: Nigeria
- Position: Forward

Senior career*
Years	Team	Apps	(Gls)
–1996	AA Gent	2	(0)
1996–1997	Deinze		
1997	Perth Glory	5	(1)
1999	Hougang United		
- * Club domestic league appearances and goals

Peter Ikechukwu Anosike (born 24 December 1976) is a Nigerian former professional footballer who played as a forward.

== Club career ==
Anosike started his career with Belgian top flight side AA Gent, where he made two league appearances without scoring. On 21 October 1995, he debuted for AA Gent during a 3–0 loss to Anderlecht. In 1996, he signed for Deinze in the Belgian second tier.

In 1997, Anosike signed for Australian club Perth Glory, where he scored a scissor kick on debut against West Adelaide. Before the 1999 season, Anosike signed for Hougang United in Singapore.

== International career ==
Anosike represented Nigeria at the 1993 FIFA U-17 World Championship, helping them win it and scoring the winning goal during the final against Ghana.
