= Piotr Orliński =

Polish association football player

Personal information
- Date of birth: 22 September 1976 (age 50)
- Place of birth: Warsaw, Poland
- Height: 1.77 m (5 ft 10 in)
- Position: Midfielder

Senior career*
Years	Team	Apps	(Gls)
–1995	Sarmata Warsaw		
1996–1997	Świt Nowy Dwór Mazowiecki		
1998–2001	Stomil Olsztyn	68	(3)
2002	Okęcie Warsaw		
2002	Žalgiris	1	(0)
2003	Persib Bandung		(1)
2003	Świt Nowy Dwór Mazowiecki	9	(0)
2004	ŁKS Łódź	12	(0)
2004–2006	Ruch Wysokie Mazowieckie		
2006	Supraślanka Supraśl		
2007	Odysseas Androutsos	14	(6)
2007	PAO Neon Epivaton		
2008	Thiva		
2008	ŁKS Łomża	14	(1)
2011	GKP Targówek		
2012	Tęcza 34 Płońsk		
2020–2021	SF Wilanów	18	(13)
2022–2023	Orzeł Kampinos	41	(5)
- * Club domestic league appearances and goals

Piotr Orliński (born 22 September 1976) is a Polish former professional footballer player who played as a midfielder.
