= 1994 FIFA World Cup qualification (CONCACAF–OFC play-off) =

Football match between Canada and Australia

- Event: 1994 FIFA World Cup qualification
Canada	Australia
(Canada)	(Australia)
3	3
- 3–3 on aggregate Australia won 4–1 on penalties

First leg
Canada	Australia
2	1
- Date: 31 July 1993
- Venue: Commonwealth Stadium, Edmonton
- Referee: Arturo Brizio Carter (Mexico)
- Attendance: 27,775

Second leg
Australia	Canada
2	1
- After extra time
- Date: 15 August 1993
- Venue: Sydney Football Stadium, Sydney
- Referee: Shin'ichirō Obata (Japan)
- Attendance: 25,982

The 1994 FIFA World Cup CONCACAF–OFC qualification play-off was an association football match played over two legs between Australia and Canada. The first leg was played at Commonwealth Stadium in Edmonton, Canada, on 31 July 1993; the second leg was played on 15 August 1993 at Sydney Football Stadium in Sydney, Australia.

Both teams had played in their regional qualifiers to qualify for the play-off. The Canadians played in twelve matches in North American qualifying across two rounds. After finishing second in their second-round group to El Salvador, they qualified to the final round where they finished second by three points to Mexico. Australia played in six matches across two rounds in Oceania qualifying. After winning their group, they defeated New Zealand across two legs to make it to the play-off.

After Canada won the opening leg 2–1 at Edmonton, Australia took a 2–1 lead in the return leg at Sydney. With the resulting aggregate tie, the game headed into extra time which was scoreless. This meant that the match went to penalties with Australia advancing through to meet South American Group 1 runner-up, Argentina which they would go on to lose 2–1 on aggregate in the play-off.

== Background ==
Canada and Australia were two of the 147 teams that competed for the 22 spots that was in the 1994 FIFA World Cup which was held in the United States. The national teams were separated into their regional confederations with spots being allocated for that confederation.

=== Canada ===
Canada began their 1994 qualification in the second round after receiving a bye in Round 1 and was put in Group B with Bermuda, El Salvador and Jamaica. They opened their 1994 campaign with two draws away from home. In Kingston, Dale Mitchell scored the equalizer against Jamaica in the 85th minute after Hector Wright had scored a goal for Jamaica seven minutes earlier. The following week, Colin Miller scored the late equalizer in San Salvador to tie the match 1-all against El Salvador after conceding a goal in the 32nd minute from Jorge González. At their first home game in Toronto, Canada recorded their first win in their campaign with a 1–0 win over Jamaica off the back of a 53rd-minute goal from Mitchell which put Canada in first place in their group. A 3–2 loss at home to El Salvador, was followed by a hat-trick from Alex Bunbury in the first half, becoming the first Canadian to score one in a competitive international match. Geoff Aunger sealed the 4–2 result for Canada over Bermuda. The final match of the second round saw Canada earn a clean sheet with a nil all draw over Bermuda in Hamilton. For Canada they finished in second place with seven points and advanced to the third round.

In the third round, they were drawn to play El Salvador, Mexico and Honduras with only the winner to qualify through to the World Cup. Their opening match in the third round against Honduras saw John Catliff open the scoring after Honduran goalkeeper Belarmino Rivera brought down Paul Peschisolido. Rodolfo Richardson Smith scored the equaliser for Honduras from a penalty before Bunbury gave the Canadians the lead once again. A late converted penalty caused by a Mark Watson handball saw the Canadian coach Bob Lenarduzzi confront the Jamaican referee after the match. The following match in Burnaby saw goals from Bunbury and Catliff give Canada a 2–0 win over El Salvador as they moved to the top of the group after two games. Their second match in Burnaby got off to a shaky start with Alex Pineda scoring the game's opening goal for Honduras against the run of play. Domenic Mobilio scored the equaliser in the 51st minute before a misplayed ball from Honduran goalkeeper Dangelo Bautista gave Canada the lead in the 61st minute. John Catliff secured the 3–1 victory for Canada over Honduras, who ended the match with nine players.

Canada suffered their first loss of the final round with a trip to Mexico City ending in a 4–0 defeat to Mexico after Ramón Ramírez scoring two goals in the first half. In the second half, Luis Flores and Alberto García each scored a goal to secure the victory. The following match in San Salvador, Catliff opened the scoring in the 27th minute to give Canada the lead. El Salvador tied the game in the 58th minute when González controlled a loose ball and scored. Two minutes later, Mobilio scored the winner to set up a must–win match against Mexico. Playing at Varsity Stadium in Toronto, Alex Bunbury opened the scoring for the Canadians in the 17th minute off a John Catliff assist. A mix-up in the Canadian backline gave Mexico the equalizer in the 34th minute with Hugo Sanchez lashing an unstoppable drive past Craig Forrest. Despite Canada's efforts to re-take the lead with an all-out offence in the second half, Mexico claimed the victory with six minutes left of the match with substitute Francisco Javier Cruz slotting the ball into an open net. Canada ended in second place with seven points, three points behind Mexico who qualified through to the 1994 World Cup.

=== Australia ===
Australia began their qualifying campaign on 4 September 1992 with an away trip to Honiara, to play the Solomon Islands. In the tropical heat, Australia's Carl Veart scored the opening goal in the eighth minute of the game before the team struggled to keep possession of the ball. Solomon Islands' persistence tied the game with Hollies Vato heading a goal. Australia replied three minutes later with a Tom McCulloch goal that sealed the 2–1 victory. One week later, the team travelled to French Polynesia to take on Tahiti in what was their second game in a World Cup qualifier. After Alistair Edwards returned to the Australian team from Malaysia, he contributed two goals with Damian Mori and Carl Veart also scoring. Paul Wade sealed the victory for Australia with a goal in the 57th minute to win the match 3–0.

The final two games of the first round were played in Australia with the first match taking place on 20 September 1992 in Brisbane against Tahiti. Carl Veart scored his third goal of the qualifying campaign in the 11th minute after Ricky Fassian could not hold the ball. Mehmet Durakovic scored the winner in the 62nd minute from a 40-metre shot which was deflected off Layton and looped over Fassian's head to seal the 2–0 victory despite being a man down earlier in the game due to a red card to Mike Peterson. The final match of the first round saw six different Australia goalscorers in a 6–1 rout over the Solomon Islands at Newcastle. After Aytec Genc scored the opener in the fifth minute of play, the Solomon Islands hit straight back with Tony Franken being stranded as Charles Ashley shot past him. Initially unable to take back the lead after the first half, Australia scored five goals in the space of 28 minutes. Ian Gray, Wade, Veart, Greg Brown and Durakovic scored to give Australia eight points from eight.

This meant Australia had qualified to take on New Zealand for a spot in the play-offs. In the first leg at Auckland, the Australians secured a 1–0 victory with the goal coming in the 55th minute from Graham Arnold. The second leg in Melbourne saw Australia score two goals in the first three minutes of the game, with Veart and Robbie Slater giving Australia a three-goal lead in the tie. A Ned Zelic goal in the second half sealed the match 3–0 and the tie 4–0 to qualify through to the play-off.

== First leg ==
=== Summary ===
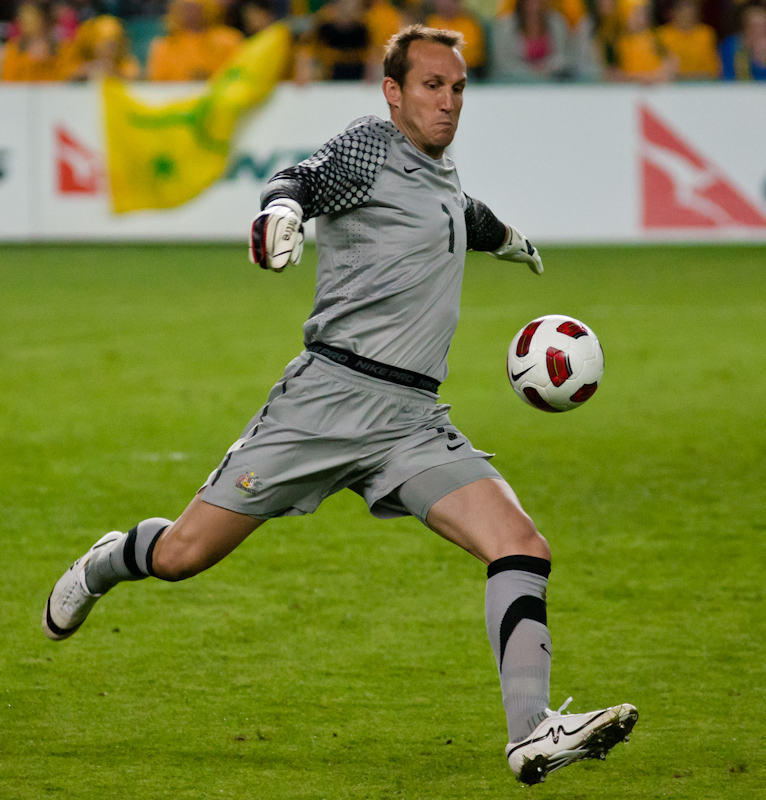
Mark Schwarzer (pictured here in 2010) made his international debut in the first leg.

The first leg of the play-off was played at Commonwealth Stadium in Edmonton on 31 July 1993 before a crowd of 27,775. Canada had the first shot of the game in the 5th minute with a Bunbury volley hitting the crossbar. Ten minutes later, the Australians lost goalkeeper Robert Zabica to a red card after colliding into Canadian midfielder Dale Mitchell. Mark Schwarzer, who was called up after first choice goalkeeper Mark Bosnich declined to leave Aston Villa, debuted for Australia as a substitute for Milan Blagojevic. Eddie Thomson later quoting after the press-conference stating, "I would like to study the video before making my mind up on the foul, but what I am positive about is that it doesn't take two minutes to send a goalkeeper off in a situation like that."

This red card also forced Robbie Slater to play right fullback. With a minute left in the first half, the Australians opened the scoring with an own goal from Canadian defender Nick Dasovic. A cross from Ned Zelic glanced off Dasovic's head into the net with barely any Australians around. The second half saw the Canadians levelling the game in the 51st minute with Mark Watson scoring a goal as he took advantage of the one man advantage. Seven minutes later, Canada took the lead after Domenic Mobilio scored a goal in what he later described as "a huge scramble. We had three or four shots in a row." The Socceroos dug in to avoid conceding a third goal as they battled in the last 30 minutes to keep the difference to only one goal.

=== Details ===
1994 FIFA World Cup qualification playoff
31 July 1993
15:30 UTC–6
First leg

Canada	2–1	Australia
Watson 50'; Mobilio 57'	Report	Dasovic 44' (o.g.)

Commonwealth Stadium, Edmonton
Attendance: 27,775
Referee: Arturo Brizio Carter (Mexico)

Canada
Australia

GK	Craig Forrest
DF	Frank Yallop
DF	Mark Watson
DF	Nick Dasovic	(substituted off) 45'
DF	Mike Sweeney
MF	Lyndon Hooper
FW	Dale Mitchell
DF	Colin Miller (c)
FW	Alexander Bunbury
FW	Domenic Mobilio
MF	John Limniatis	(substituted off) 45'
Substitutions:
FW	Carl Valentine	(substituted on) 45'
MF	Norman Odinga	(substituted on) 45'
Manager:
(Canada) Bob Lenarduzzi

GK	Robert Zabica	(red card) 17'
DF	Ned Zelic
MF	Paul Okon
MF	Robbie Slater
DF	Milan Blagojevic	(substituted off) 17'
DF	Alexander Tobin
FW	Frank Farina
MF	Aurelio Vidmar	(substituted off) 70'
FW	Graham Arnold (c)
MF	Jason van Blerk
DF	Mehmet Durakovic
Substitutions:
GK	Mark Schwarzer	(substituted on) 17'
MF	Jason Polak	(substituted on) 70'
Manager:
(Scotland) Eddie Thomson

== Second leg ==
=== Summary ===
The second leg of the play-off was played at the Sydney Football Stadium on 15 August 1993 before a crowd of 25,982. Defender Randy Samuel was brought back into the Canadian squad from a one-game suspension which ruled him out of the first leg in Edmonton. Tony Vidmar and Milan Blagojevic were added to the starting lineup for Australia. The first half of the match was dominated by Australia with them outshooting Canada 10–1. Australia was later rewarded at the brink of half-time with Frank Farina scoring the opening goal from an overhead kick. Quoted after the match, Farina said, "The first half was the best I've ever seen from an Australian team, and only superb play from Forrest kept us out."

A half-time substitution from Canada brought in Carl Valentine for Mobilio and the tactical change worked with Lyndon Hooper scoring the goal in the 54th minute while on the run as the ball was deflected off Schwarzer's gloves and inside the far net to give Canada the lead on aggregate. In the 76th minute, Dave Mitchell was brought on to replace Robbie Slater and it only took a minute before winning an aerial play against Samuel with Slater passing Mehmet Duraković the ball and Australia the lead as he scored into an unguarded net after the ball went over Forrest's head. Thirty minutes of extra time failed to break the 3–3 aggregate deadlock which saw Grant Needham stretchered off after colliding with Duraković, and the match went into penalties. From there, Schwarzer saved two critical shots from Bunbury and Mike Sweeney as he aided in the Australian victory with Farina sealing it with his shot.

=== Details ===
15 August 1993
16:00 UTC+10
Second leg

Australia	2–1 (a.e.t.)	Canada
Farina 45'; Durakovic 77'	Report	Hooper 54'
Penalties
Wade (penalty scored); A. Vidmar (penalty scored); Tobin (penalty scored); Farina (penalty scored)	4–1	(penalty scored) Mitchell; (penalty missed) Bunbury; (penalty missed) Sweeney

Sydney Football Stadium, Sydney
Attendance: 25,982
Referee: Shin'ichirō Obata (Japan)

Australia
Canada

GK	20	Mark Schwarzer
DF	19	Tony Vidmar
DF	4	Ned Zelic	(substituted off) 100'
MF	11	Robbie Slater	(substituted off) 76'
DF	13	Mehmet Durakovic
DF	12	Milan Blagojevic
DF	5	Alexander Tobin
FW	7	Frank Farina
MF	8	Aurelio Vidmar
FW	9	Graham Arnold (c)
MF	10	Jason van Blerk
Substitutions:
FW		David Mitchell	(substituted on) 76'
MF		Paul Wade	(substituted on) 100'
Manager:
(Scotland) Eddie Thomson

GK	1	Craig Forrest
DF	2	Frank Yallop
DF	16	Mark Watson
DF	3	Mike Sweeney
DF	5	Randy Samuel
DF	4	Nick Dasovic	(substituted off) 108'
MF	8	Lyndon Hooper
FW	11	Dale Mitchell
DF	6	Colin Miller (c)
FW	14	Domenic Mobilio	(substituted off) 45'
FW	9	Alex Bunbury
Substitutions:
FW		Carl Valentine	(substituted on) 45'
FW		Grant Needham	(substituted on) 108'
Manager:
(Canada) Bob Lenarduzzi

== Aftermath ==
After the second leg, Canadian manager Bob Lenarduzzi was quoted saying, "Although we are disappointed, I don't think we let anybody down." He later added, "we're all pulling for them because the farther they go, the better it makes us look." The Australian coach, Eddie Thomson, responded in his interview, "this was a win full of character; the whole team played really well."

Australia went on to meet Argentina in the deciding play-off for the 1994 FIFA World Cup. After the first match ended in a 1–1 draw at Sydney, they would concede an own goal in the second leg with a deflection off Alex Tobin going over Robert Zabica's head and into the far side of the net to lose the tie 2–1 and have Australia eliminated from qualifying. It was not until 2005 that they won a World Cup play-off to qualify through to the 2006 FIFA World Cup, defeating Uruguay on penalties.

After subsequent failed attempts to qualify for the FIFA World Cup through CONCACAF, Canada finally qualified for the 2022 FIFA World Cup on 27 March 2022 after having beaten Jamaica 4–0 in Toronto, ending a 36-year drought since its first qualification in 1986.
