= 2018 UEFA European Under-17 Championship qualification =

Tournament details
- Dates: Qualifying round: 27 September – 1 November 2017; Elite round: 7–28 March 2018
- Teams: 54 (from 1 confederation)

Tournament statistics
- Matches played: 126
- Goals scored: 343 (2.72 per match)
- Top scorer: (Republic of Ireland) Adam Idah (8 goals)

The 2018 UEFA European Under-17 Championship qualifying competition was a men's under-17 football competition that determined the 15 teams joining the automatically qualified hosts England in the 2018 UEFA European Under-17 Championship final tournament.

Apart from England, all remaining 54 UEFA member national teams entered the qualifying competition (including Kosovo who entered for the first time). Players born on or after 1 January 2001 are eligible to participate. Each match has a duration of 80 minutes, consisting of two halves of 40 minutes with a 15-minute half-time.

== Format ==
The qualifying competition consists of two rounds:

- Qualifying round: Apart from Germany and Portugal, which receive byes to the elite round as the teams with the highest seeding coefficient, the remaining 52 teams are drawn into 13 groups of four teams. Each group is played in single round-robin format at one of the teams selected as hosts after the draw. The 13 group winners, the 13 runners-up, and the four third-placed teams with the best record against the first and second-placed teams in their group advance to the elite round.
- Elite round: The 32 teams are drawn into eight groups of four teams. Each group is played in single round-robin format at one of the teams selected as hosts after the draw. The eight group winners and the seven runners-up with the best record against the first and third-placed teams in their group qualify for the final tournament.

The schedule of each mini-tournament is as follows (Regulations Article 20.04):

Matchday	Matches
Matchday 1	1 v 4, 3 v 2
Rest days (2 days)	—
Matchday 2	1 v 3, 2 v 4
Rest days (2 days)	—
Matchday 3	2 v 1, 4 v 3

=== Tiebreakers ===
In the qualifying round and elite round, teams are ranked according to points (3 points for a win, 1 point for a draw, 0 points for a loss), and if tied on points, the following tiebreaking criteria are applied, in the order given, to determine the rankings (Regulations Articles 14.01 and 14.02):

1. Points in head-to-head matches among tied teams;
2. Goal difference in head-to-head matches among tied teams;
3. Goals scored in head-to-head matches among tied teams;
4. If more than two teams are tied, and after applying all head-to-head criteria above, a subset of teams are still tied, all head-to-head criteria above are reapplied exclusively to this subset of teams;
5. Goal difference in all group matches;
6. Goals scored in all group matches;
7. Penalty shoot-out if only two teams have the same number of points, and they met in the last round of the group and are tied after applying all criteria above (not used if more than two teams have the same number of points, or if their rankings are not relevant for qualification for the next stage);
8. Disciplinary points (red card = 3 points, yellow card = 1 point, expulsion for two yellow cards in one match = 3 points);
9. UEFA coefficient for the qualifying round draw;
10. Drawing of lots.

To determine the four best third-placed teams from the qualifying round and the seven best runners-up from the elite round, the results against the teams in fourth place are discarded. The following criteria are applied (Regulations Articles 15.01, 15.02 and 15.03):

1. Points;
2. Goal difference;
3. Goals scored;
4. Disciplinary points;
5. UEFA coefficient for the qualifying round draw;
6. Drawing of lots.

== Qualifying round ==
=== Draw ===
The draw for the qualifying round was held on 13 December 2016, 09:00 CET (UTC+1), at the UEFA headquarters in Nyon, Switzerland.

The teams were seeded according to their coefficient ranking, calculated based on the following:

- 2014 UEFA European Under-17 Championship final tournament and qualifying competition (qualifying round and elite round)
- 2015 UEFA European Under-17 Championship final tournament and qualifying competition (qualifying round and elite round)
- 2016 UEFA European Under-17 Championship final tournament and qualifying competition (qualifying round and elite round)

Each group contained one team from Pot A, one team from Pot B, one team from Pot C, and one team from Pot D. For political reasons, Russia and Ukraine, Spain and Gibraltar, Serbia and Kosovo, and Bosnia and Herzegovina and Kosovo would not be drawn in the same group.

Final tournament hosts
Team	Coeff	Rank
**England**	12.167	—

Bye to elite round
Team	Coeff	Rank
**Germany**	14.667	1
**Portugal**	11.167	2

Teams entering qualifying round

Pot A
Team	Coeff	Rank
**Netherlands**	10.667	3
**Spain**	10.000	4
France	10.000	5
Scotland	9.000	6
Austria	8.833	7
Russia	8.667	8
**Italy**	8.500	9
Czech Republic	8.500	10
**Serbia**	8.333	11
**Belgium**	8.333	12
Poland	7.833	13
**Bosnia and Herzegovina**	7.000	14
**Republic of Ireland**	6.833	15

Pot B
Team	Coeff	Rank
Croatia	6.500	16
Greece	6.333	17
Ukraine	6.167	18
**Switzerland**	6.167	19
**Sweden**	5.500	20
**Denmark**	5.500	21
**Slovenia**	5.333	22
Turkey	5.167	23
Iceland	5.000	24
Romania	5.000	25
Wales	4.833	26
Georgia	4.833	27
Slovakia	4.833	28

Pot C
Team	Coeff	Rank
**Israel**	4.833	29
Bulgaria	3.667	30
**Norway**	3.500	31
Belarus	3.500	32
Latvia	3.000	33
Estonia	3.000	34
Cyprus	3.000	35
Hungary	2.667	36
Northern Ireland	2.667	37
Finland	2.500	38
Albania	2.500	39
Lithuania	2.000	40
Moldova	2.000	41

Pot D
Team	Coeff	Rank
Macedonia	1.667	42
Montenegro	1.500	43
Azerbaijan	1.500	44
Armenia	1.333	45
Luxembourg	1.333	46
Faroe Islands	1.333	47
Liechtenstein	1.000	48
San Marino	0.333	49
Gibraltar	0.333	50
Andorra	0.000	51
Malta	0.000	52
Kazakhstan	0.000	53
Kosovo	—	54

Notes

- Teams marked in **bold** have qualified for the final tournament.

=== Groups ===
The qualifying round must be played by 19 November 2017.

Times up to 28 October 2017 are CEST (UTC+2), thereafter times are CET (UTC+1).

==== Group 1 ====
Pos	Team	Pld	W	D	L	GF	GA	GD	Pts	Qualification
1	Belgium	3	3	0	0	8	1	+7	**9**	Elite round
2	Switzerland	3	2	0	1	6	2	+4	**6**	Elite round
3	Northern Ireland	3	1	0	2	1	8	−7	**3**	
4	Malta (H)	3	0	0	3	1	5	−4	**0**	

Source: UEFA
Rules for classification: Qualification tiebreakers
(H) Hosts
26 October 2017
11:00

Belgium	3–1	Malta
Vertessen 22'; Lemoine 32', 45'	Report	Satariano 69'

Centenary Stadium, Ta' Qali
Referee: Michal Ocenáš (Slovakia)
26 October 2017
14:00

Northern Ireland	0–5	Switzerland
	Report	Vonmoos 13'; Mambimbi 17'; Vasic 63', 66', 72'

Centenary Stadium, Ta' Qali
Referee: Juri Frischer (Estonia)

29 October 2017
11:00

Belgium	3–0	Northern Ireland
Dendoncker 11'; Colassin 17'; Vertessen 49'	Report

Centenary Stadium, Ta' Qali
Referee: Michal Ocenáš (Slovakia)
29 October 2017
14:00

Switzerland	1–0	Malta
Sohm 79'	Report

Centenary Stadium, Ta' Qali
Referee: Omar Pashayev (Azerbaijan)

1 November 2017
11:00

Switzerland	0–2	Belgium
	Report	Symons 37'; Timassi 41'

National Stadium, Ta' Qali
Referee: Juri Frischer (Estonia)
1 November 2017
11:00

Malta	0–1	Northern Ireland
	Report	Wilson 45'

Centenary Stadium, Ta' Qali
Referee: Omar Pashayev (Azerbaijan)

==== Group 2 ====
Pos	Team	Pld	W	D	L	GF	GA	GD	Pts	Qualification
1	Croatia	3	2	1	0	8	1	+7	**7**	Elite round
2	Spain	3	2	1	0	5	1	+4	**7**	Elite round
3	Albania (H)	3	1	0	2	5	2	+3	**3**	
4	Liechtenstein	3	0	0	3	0	14	−14	**0**	

Source: UEFA
Rules for classification: Qualification tiebreakers
(H) Hosts
19 October 2017
12:00

Spain	3–0	Liechtenstein
Camello 17', 68'; González 45'	Report

Niko Dovana Stadium, Durrës
Referee: Alex Troleis (Faroe Islands)
19 October 2017
14:00

Albania	0–1	Croatia
	Report	Krizmanić 78' (pen.)

Selman Stërmasi Stadium, Tirana
Referee: Mykola Balakin (Ukraine)

22 October 2017
12:00

Spain	1–0	Albania
Touaizi 77'	Report

Selman Stërmasi Stadium, Tirana
Referee: Zbynek Proske (Czech Republic)
22 October 2017
14:00

Croatia	6–0	Liechtenstein
Marin 5', 34' (pen.); Šarić 9'; Krizmanić 20'; Vušković 65'; Brnić 79'	Report

Elbasan Arena, Elbasan
Referee: Alex Troleis (Faroe Islands)

25 October 2017
14:00

Croatia	1–1	Spain
Vušković 39' (pen.)	Report	Touaizi 35'

Elbasan Arena, Elbasan
Referee: Mykola Balakin (Ukraine)
25 October 2017
14:00

Liechtenstein	0–5	Albania
	Report	Bozhanaj 10', 21', 50'; Rama 24'; Bullari 33'

Selman Stërmasi Stadium, Tirana
Referee: Zbynek Proske (Czech Republic)

==== Group 3 ====
Pos	Team	Pld	W	D	L	GF	GA	GD	Pts	Qualification
1	Israel	3	3	0	0	6	0	+6	**9**	Elite round
2	Czech Republic (H)	3	1	1	1	8	3	+5	**4**	Elite round
3	Turkey	3	1	1	1	5	2	+3	**4**	Elite round
4	Armenia	3	0	0	3	0	14	−14	**0**	

Source: UEFA
Rules for classification: Qualification tiebreakers
(H) Hosts
13 October 2017
15:00

Czech Republic	7–0	Armenia
Krobot 12' (pen.); Holzer 21'; Firbacher 31'; Eichler 40+2'; Ghazaryan 47' (o.g.); Kozák 62', 64'	Report

Stadion FK Letohrad, Letohrad
Referee: Espen Eskås (Norway)
13 October 2017
15:00

Israel	1–0	Turkey
Ovadia 8'	Report

Svitavský stadion, Svitavy
Referee: Stefan Apostolov (Bulgaria)

16 October 2017
15:00

Czech Republic	0–2	Israel
	Report	Abada 71'; Ovadia 80+2'

Stadion FK Letohrad, Letohrad
Referee: Farrugia Cann Trustin (Malta)
16 October 2017
15:00

Turkey	4–0	Armenia
Bakan 23'; Altunbaş 52'; Kaya 77'; Çelik 79'	Report

Svitavský stadion, Svitavy
Referee: Espen Eskås (Norway)

19 October 2017
15:00

Turkey	1–1	Czech Republic
Gündüz 22' (pen.)	Report	Gabriel 49'

Svitavský stadion, Svitavy
Referee: Stefan Apostolov (Bulgaria)
19 October 2017
15:00

Armenia	0–3	Israel
	Report	Ram 45'; Biton 59'; Abada 69'

Stadion FK Letohrad, Letohrad
Referee: Farrugia Cann Trustin (Malta)

==== Group 4 ====
Pos	Team	Pld	W	D	L	GF	GA	GD	Pts	Qualification
1	Finland (H)	3	2	1	0	5	0	+5	**7**	Elite round
2	Iceland	3	2	1	0	4	0	+4	**7**	Elite round
3	Russia	3	1	0	2	3	4	−1	**3**	
4	Faroe Islands	3	0	0	3	1	9	−8	**0**	

Source: UEFA
Rules for classification: Qualification tiebreakers
(H) Hosts
27 September 2017
12:00

Russia	3–1	Faroe Islands
Kutovoy 11'; Petrov 30'; Gerchikov 62'	Report	Kutovoy 8' (o.g.)

Arto Tolsa Areena, Kotka
Referee: Aleksandrs Golubevs (Latvia)
27 September 2017
17:00

Finland	0–0	Iceland
	Report

Arto Tolsa Areena, Kotka
Referee: Krzysztof Jakubik (Poland)

30 September 2017
12:00

Iceland	2–0	Faroe Islands
Sigurdarson 28', 53'	Report

Kymenlaakson Sähkö Stadion, Kouvola
Referee: Aleksandrs Golubevs (Latvia)
30 September 2017
17:00

Russia	0–1	Finland
	Report	Tolonen 38'

Kymenlaakson Sähkö Stadion, Kouvola
Referee: Filip Glova (Slovakia)

3 October 2017
12:00

Iceland	2–0	Russia
Guðjohnsen 25' (pen.), 30'	Report

Kymenlaakson Sähkö Stadion, Kouvola
Referee: Krzysztof Jakubik (Poland)
3 October 2017
12:00

Faroe Islands	0–4	Finland
	Report	Mastokangas 6', 48' (pen.); Ablade 32', 55'

Arto Tolsa Areena, Kotka
Referee: Filip Glova (Slovakia)

==== Group 5 ====
Pos	Team	Pld	W	D	L	GF	GA	GD	Pts	Qualification
1	Serbia (H)	3	3	0	0	12	3	+9	**9**	Elite round
2	Greece	3	2	0	1	9	3	+6	**6**	Elite round
3	Norway	3	1	0	2	11	3	+8	**3**	Elite round
4	Gibraltar	3	0	0	3	0	23	−23	**0**	

Source: UEFA
Rules for classification: Qualification tiebreakers
(H) Hosts
18 October 2017
11:00

Norway	0–1	Greece
	Report	Thymianis 28'

Serbian FA Sports Center, Stara Pazova
Referee: Fyodor Zammit (Malta)
18 October 2017
14:30

Serbia	7–0	Gibraltar
Novaković 6', 42'; Burmaz 29'; Vidosavljević 30', 39'; Pavlović 66'; Velikić 78'	Report

Serbian FA Sports Center, Stara Pazova
Referee: Suren Baliyan (Armenia)

21 October 2017
11:00

Greece	6–0	Gibraltar
Vrakas 9', 15'; Tzimas 37', 45', 63', 74'	Report

Serbian FA Sports Center, Stara Pazova
Referee: Suren Baliyan (Armenia)
21 October 2017
14:30

Serbia	2–1	Norway
Ilić 7' (pen.); Vidosavljević 69'	Report	Aga 70'

Serbian FA Sports Center, Stara Pazova
Referee: Luis Miguel Branco Godinho (Portugal)

24 October 2017
14:30

Greece	2–3	Serbia
Thymianis 29'; Mavroudis 55'	Report	Vidosavljević 49' (pen.); Mitrović 71'; Novaković 80+3'

Serbian FA Sports Center, Stara Pazova
Referee: Luis Miguel Branco Godinho (Portugal)
24 October 2017
14:30

Gibraltar	0–10	Norway
	Report	Hansen 7', 10', 20', 32'; Aga 12', 29', 66', 74'; Baccay 44'; Christiansen 70'

Serbian FA Sports Center, Stara Pazova
Referee: Fyodor Zammit (Malta)

==== Group 6 ====
Pos	Team	Pld	W	D	L	GF	GA	GD	Pts	Qualification
1	France	3	3	0	0	10	2	+8	**9**	Elite round
2	Slovenia	3	2	0	1	3	2	+1	**6**	Elite round
3	Belarus (H)	3	1	0	2	4	5	−1	**3**	
4	Kazakhstan	3	0	0	3	1	9	−8	**0**	

Source: UEFA
Rules for classification: Qualification tiebreakers
(H) Hosts
19 October 2017
11:00

Belarus	0–1	Slovenia
	Report	Prelec 60'

Spartak Stadium, Mogilev
Referee: Stavros Mantalos (Greece)
19 October 2017
17:00

France	5–0	Kazakhstan
Diaby 4', 15', 18'; Mbe Soh 24'; Da Cunha 30'	Report

Spartak Stadium, Mogilev
Referee: Edin Jakupović (Bosnia and Herzegovina)

22 October 2017
11:00

France	3–1	Belarus
Belashevich 11' (o.g.); Diaby 31', 61' (pen.)	Report	Milasheuski 70' (pen.)

Spartak Stadium, Mogilev
Referee: Edin Jakupović (Bosnia and Herzegovina)
22 October 2017
17:00

Slovenia	1–0	Kazakhstan
Prelec 22'	Report

Spartak Stadium, Mogilev
Referee: Iwan Arwel Griffith (Wales)

25 October 2017
11:00

Slovenia	1–2	France
Simič 68'	Report	Diaby 61'; Da Cunha 65'

City Stadium, Orsha
Referee: Stavros Mantalos (Greece)
25 October 2017
11:00

Kazakhstan	1–3	Belarus
Basmanov 17'	Report	Kapraliou 10', 57', 80+1'

Spartak Stadium, Mogilev
Referee: Iwan Arwel Griffith (Wales)

==== Group 7 ====
Pos	Team	Pld	W	D	L	GF	GA	GD	Pts	Qualification
1	Scotland	3	2	1	0	5	1	+4	**7**	Elite round
2	Denmark	3	2	1	0	2	0	+2	**7**	Elite round
3	Andorra	3	0	1	2	1	3	−2	**1**	
4	Estonia (H)	3	0	1	2	0	4	−4	**1**	

Source: UEFA
Rules for classification: Qualification tiebreakers
(H) Hosts
22 October 2017
12:00

Scotland	2–1	Andorra
Leonard 8', 49'	Report	Alonso 36'

Kadriorg Stadium, Tallinn
Referee: Genc Nuza (Kosovo)
22 October 2017
15:00

Estonia	0–1	Denmark
	Report	Brajanac 80+3' (pen.)

A. Le Coq Arena, Tallinn
Referee: Duje Strukan (Croatia)

25 October 2017
14:00

Denmark	1–0	Andorra
Andersen 71' (pen.)	Report

Kadriorg Stadium, Tallinn
Referee: Genc Nuza (Kosovo)
25 October 2017
17:00

Scotland	3–0	Estonia
Semple 16'; Gilmour 44'; Campbell 78' (pen.)	Report

A. Le Coq Arena, Tallinn
Referee: Pavel Orel (Czech Republic)

28 October 2017
12:00

Denmark	0–0	Scotland
	Report

Nike Stadium, Tallinn
Referee: Duje Strukan (Croatia)
28 October 2017
12:00

Andorra	0–0	Estonia
	Report

A. Le Coq Arena, Tallinn
Referee: Pavel Orel (Czech Republic)

==== Group 8 ====
Pos	Team	Pld	W	D	L	GF	GA	GD	Pts	Qualification
1	Bosnia and Herzegovina	3	1	2	0	5	1	+4	**5 (Note: Head-to-head results: Bosnia and Herzegovina 0–0 Macedonia, Slovakia 0–0 Macedonia, Slovakia 1–1 Bosnia and Herzegovina. Head-to-head standings: Bosnia and Herzegovina: 2 pts, 0 GD, 1 GF; Slovakia: 2 pts, 0 GD, 1 GF; Macedonia: 2 pts, 0 GD, 0 GF; Macedonia are ranked third on head-to-head goals scored. Bosnia and Herzegovina and Slovakia are tied on their own head-to-head result, and are ranked on total goal difference.)**	Elite round
2	Slovakia	3	1	2	0	3	1	+2	**5**	Elite round
3	Macedonia (H)	3	1	2	0	2	0	+2	**5**	Elite round
4	Moldova	3	0	0	3	0	8	−8	**0**	

Source: UEFA
Rules for classification: Qualification tiebreakers
(H) Hosts
Notes:
2 October 2017
15:00

Bosnia and Herzegovina	0–0	Macedonia
	Report

Training Centre Petar Miloševski, Skopje
Referee: Furkat Atazhanov (Kazakhstan)
2 October 2017
15:00

Moldova	0–2	Slovakia
	Report	Burian 30'; Bernát 39'

Boris Trajkovski Stadium, Skopje
Referee: Robert Hennessy (Republic of Ireland)

5 October 2017
15:00

Bosnia and Herzegovina	4–0	Moldova
Hasić 6', 14' (pen.), 78'; Badžak 47'	Report

Boris Trajkovski Stadium, Skopje
Referee: Jari Järvinen (Finland)
5 October 2017
15:00

Slovakia	0–0	Macedonia
	Report

Training Centre Petar Miloševski, Skopje
Referee: Robert Hennessy (Republic of Ireland)

8 October 2017
15:00

Slovakia	1–1	Bosnia and Herzegovina
Lavrinčík 61'	Report	Stanić 66'

Boris Trajkovski Stadium, Skopje
Referee: Jari Järvinen (Finland)
8 October 2017
15:00

Macedonia	2–0	Moldova
Novevski 6'; Tasevski 67'	Report

Training Centre Petar Miloševski, Skopje
Referee: Furkat Atazhanov (Kazakhstan)

==== Group 9 ====
Pos	Team	Pld	W	D	L	GF	GA	GD	Pts	Qualification
1	Hungary (H)	3	3	0	0	6	2	+4	**9**	Elite round
2	Netherlands	3	2	0	1	7	2	+5	**6**	Elite round
3	Wales	3	1	0	2	3	6	−3	**3**	
4	Kosovo	3	0	0	3	2	8	−6	**0**	

Source: UEFA
Rules for classification: Qualification tiebreakers
(H) Hosts
10 October 2017
14:00

Netherlands	3–1	Kosovo
Redan 12', 23', 56'	Report	Prapashtica 13'

Hévízi úti Stadion, Budapest
Referee: Daniyar Sakhi (Kazakhstan)
10 October 2017
14:00

Hungary	2–1	Wales
Cipf 22' (pen.); Varju 44'	Report	Hosie 37'

Globall Football Park, Telki
Referee: Alexandros Aretopoulos (Greece)

13 October 2017
14:00

Netherlands	0–1	Hungary
	Report	Beke 49'

Hévízi úti Stadion, Budapest
Referee: Donatas Rumšas (Lithuania)
13 October 2017
14:00

Wales	2–0	Kosovo
Watts 70'; Davies 80+2'	Report

Városi Stadion, Csákvár
Referee: Daniyar Sakhi (Kazakhstan)

16 October 2017
16:00

Wales	0–4	Netherlands
	Report	Pattern 5' (o.g.); Redan 46'; Van der Heide 51'; Zirkzee 62'

Globall Football Park, Telki
Referee: Alexandros Aretopoulos (Greece)
16 October 2017
16:00

Kosovo	1–3	Hungary
Hysenaj 15'	Report	Tóth-Gábor 43', 71'; Csala 80+2'

Szusza Ferenc stadion, Budapest
Referee: Donatas Rumšas (Lithuania)

==== Group 10 ====
Pos	Team	Pld	W	D	L	GF	GA	GD	Pts	Qualification
1	Austria	3	3	0	0	5	1	+4	**9**	Elite round
2	Romania (H)	3	1	1	1	2	2	0	**4**	Elite round
3	Lithuania	3	1	0	2	3	5	−2	**3**	
4	Luxembourg	3	0	1	2	2	4	−2	**1**	

Source: UEFA
Rules for classification: Qualification tiebreakers
(H) Hosts
23 October 2017
14:00

Austria	2–1	Luxembourg
Monsberger 33', 56'	Report	Duarte 50'

Stadionul CNAF, Buftea
Referee: Jason Barcelo (Gibraltar)
23 October 2017
18:00

Lithuania	1–2	Romania
Andriušis 32'	Report	Vlad 6'; Alexandru 26'

Stadionul Mogoșoaia Pitch 2, Mogoșoaia
Referee: Kai Erik Steen (Norway)

26 October 2017
14:00

Austria	2–0	Lithuania
Schöfl 4'; Moormann 52'	Report

Stadionul CNAF, Buftea
Referee: Aleksei Matyunin (Russia)
26 October 2017
18:00

Romania	0–0	Luxembourg
	Report

Stadionul Mogoșoaia Pitch 2, Mogoșoaia
Referee: Kai Erik Steen (Norway)

29 October 2017
16:00

Romania	0–1	Austria
	Report	Abdijanovic 80+3'

Stadionul Mogoșoaia Pitch 2, Mogoșoaia
Referee: Aleksei Matyunin (Russia)
29 October 2017
16:00

Luxembourg	1–2	Lithuania
Held 65'	Report	Juodkūnaitis 11'; Piliukaitis 22'

Stadionul CNAF, Buftea
Referee: Jason Barcelo (Gibraltar)

==== Group 11 ====
Pos	Team	Pld	W	D	L	GF	GA	GD	Pts	Qualification
1	Republic of Ireland	3	3	0	0	12	1	+11	**9**	Elite round
2	Ukraine	3	2	0	1	10	4	+6	**6**	Elite round
3	Azerbaijan	3	1	0	2	3	13	−10	**3**	
4	Bulgaria (H)	3	0	0	3	1	8	−7	**0**	

Source: UEFA
Rules for classification: Qualification tiebreakers
(H) Hosts
10 October 2017
15:00

Republic of Ireland	6–0	Azerbaijan
Idah 6', 24', 58'; Brennan 36'; Murphy 38'; Wright 43'	Report

Lokomotiv Stadium, Gorna Oryahovitsa
Referee: Barbeno Luca (San Marino)
10 October 2017
17:30

Bulgaria	0–3	Ukraine
	Report	Voloshyn 38'; Mudryk 47'; Sikan 68'

Ivaylo Stadium, Veliko Tarnovo
Referee: Halil Umut Meler (Turkey)

13 October 2017
15:00

Ukraine	6–1	Azerbaijan
Mudryk 3'; Yakuba 15'; Sikan 35'; Aussi 62'; Biblyk 78'; Shulianskyi 80+1'	Report	Zulfugarli 17'

Lokomotiv Stadium, Gorna Oryahovitsa
Referee: Halil Umut Meler (Turkey)
13 October 2017
17:30

Republic of Ireland	3–0	Bulgaria
Idah 3', 72'; Coffey 18'	Report

Ivaylo Stadium, Veliko Tarnovo
Referee: Peter Kjaesgaard-Andersen (Denmark)

16 October 2017
17:30

Ukraine	1–3	Republic of Ireland
Voloshyn 14'	Report	Idah 42', 80+2'; O'Reilly 54'

Ivaylo Stadium, Veliko Tarnovo
Referee: Peter Kjaesgaard-Andersen (Denmark)
16 October 2017
17:30

Azerbaijan	2–1	Bulgaria
Valizada 18', 80+2'	Report	Nikolov 45'

Lokomotiv Stadium, Gorna Oryahovitsa
Referee: Barbeno Luca (San Marino)

==== Group 12 ====
Pos	Team	Pld	W	D	L	GF	GA	GD	Pts	Qualification
1	Poland	3	2	1	0	10	1	+9	**7**	Elite round
2	Sweden	3	1	2	0	11	2	+9	**5**	Elite round
3	Cyprus (H)	3	1	1	1	6	2	+4	**4**	Elite round
4	San Marino	3	0	0	3	0	22	−22	**0**	

Source: UEFA
Rules for classification: Qualification tiebreakers
(H) Hosts
17 October 2017
14:00

Poland	8–0	San Marino
Kobacki 14'; Czyż 18'; J. Karbownik 21', 36'; Żuk 59'; Contadini 68' (o.g.); Bida 76'; M. Karbownik 78'	Report

Stelios Kyriakides Stadium, Paphos
Referee: Luís Teixeira (Portugal)
17 October 2017
14:00

Cyprus	1–1	Sweden
Vrikkis 47'	Report	Andersson 80+3'

Kouklia Community Stadium, Paphos
Referee: Ian McNabb (Northern Ireland)

20 October 2017
14:00

Poland	1–0	Cyprus
Mi. Nawrocki 78'	Report

Kouklia Community Stadium, Paphos
Referee: Bojan Nikolić (Serbia)
20 October 2017
14:00

Sweden	9–0	San Marino
Larsson 4', 15'; Lahne 18'; Nygren 25', 38', 45', 65'; Hammar 30'; Mujanic 58'	Report

Stelios Kyriakides Stadium, Paphos
Referee: Ian McNabb (Northern Ireland)

23 October 2017
14:00

Sweden	1–1	Poland
Wikström 80+3'	Report	J. Karbownik 36'

Stelios Kyriakides Stadium, Paphos
Referee: Bojan Nikolić (Serbia)
23 October 2017
14:00

San Marino	0–5	Cyprus
	Report	Kapsos 4'; Paroutis 22'; Mamas 37'; Constantinidis 60'; Raspas 65'

Kouklia Community Stadium, Paphos
Referee: Luís Teixeira (Portugal)

==== Group 13 ====
Pos	Team	Pld	W	D	L	GF	GA	GD	Pts	Qualification
1	Italy	3	3	0	0	6	0	+6	**9**	Elite round
2	Georgia (H)	3	2	0	1	3	2	+1	**6**	Elite round
3	Latvia	3	0	1	2	1	3	−2	**1**	
4	Montenegro	3	0	1	2	1	6	−5	**1**	

Source: UEFA
Rules for classification: Qualification tiebreakers
(H) Hosts
24 October 2017
13:00

Italy	3–0	Montenegro
Riccardi 16'; Fagioli 18'; Ghislandi 74'	Report

David Petriashvili Stadium, Tbilisi
Attendance: 100
Referee: Glenn Nyberg (Sweden)
24 October 2017
16:00

Latvia	0–1	Georgia
	Report	Kvaratskhelia 21'

Mikheil Meskhi Stadium, Tbilisi
Attendance: 1400
Referee: Rahim Hasanov (Azerbaijan)

27 October 2017
13:00

Italy	1–0	Latvia
Fagioli 19'	Report

David Petriashvili Stadium, Tbilisi
Attendance: 60
Referee: Erik Lambrechts (Belgium)
27 October 2017
16:00

Georgia	2–0	Montenegro
Davitashvili 28'; Kvaratskhelia 46'	Report

Mikheil Meskhi Stadium, Tbilisi
Attendance: 1500
Referee: Glenn Nyberg (Sweden)

30 October 2017
15:00

Georgia	0–2	Italy
	Report	Ghislandi 32'; Vergani 40' (pen.)

Mikheil Meskhi Stadium, Tbilisi
Attendance: 1250
Referee: Erik Lambrechts (Belgium)
30 October 2017
17:50 (Note: The match between Montenegro and Latvia, which kicked off on 30 October 2017, 15:00 CET in David Petriashvili Stadium, was suspended after 1:35 minutes due to strong winds and broken floodlights. The match resumed on 17:50 CET in Mikheil Meskhi Stadium.)

Montenegro	1–1	Latvia
Vujanović 50'	Report	Varslavāns 71' (pen.)

Mikheil Meskhi Stadium, Tbilisi
Attendance: 0
Referee: Rahim Hasanov (Azerbaijan)

=== Ranking of third-placed teams ===
To determine the four best third-placed teams from the qualifying round which advance to the elite round, only the results of the third-placed teams against the first and second-placed teams in their group are taken into account.

Pos	Grp	Team	Pld	W	D	L	GF	GA	GD	Pts	Qualification
1	8	Macedonia	2	0	2	0	0	0	0	2	Elite round
2	12	Cyprus	2	0	1	1	1	2	−1	1 (Note: Ranked by disciplinary points (Cyprus: 2 pts; Turkey: 5 pts).)	Elite round
3	3	Turkey	2	0	1	1	1	2	−1	1	Elite round
4	5	Norway	2	0	0	2	1	3	−2	0 (Note: Ranked by disciplinary points (Norway: 4 pts; Andorra: 5 pts).)	Elite round
5	7	Andorra	2	0	0	2	1	3	−2	0	
6	13	Latvia	2	0	0	2	0	2	−2	0 (Note: Ranked by disciplinary points (Latvia: 3 pts; Albania: 7 pts).)	
7	2	Albania	2	0	0	2	0	2	−2	0	
8	6	Belarus	2	0	0	2	1	4	−3	0 (Note: Ranked by disciplinary points (Belarus: 1 pt; Lithuania: 4 pts).)	
9	10	Lithuania	2	0	0	2	1	4	−3	0	
10	4	Russia	2	0	0	2	0	3	−3	0	
11	9	Wales	2	0	0	2	1	6	−5	0	
12	1	Northern Ireland	2	0	0	2	0	8	−8	0	
13	11	Azerbaijan	2	0	0	2	1	12	−11	0	

Source: UEFA
Rules for classification: 1) points; 2) goal difference; 3) goals scored; 4) disciplinary points; 5) coefficient; 6) drawing of lots.

== Elite round ==
=== Draw ===
The draw for the elite round was held on 6 December 2017, 11:45 CET (UTC+1), at the UEFA headquarters in Nyon, Switzerland.

The teams were seeded according to their results in the qualifying round. Germany and Portugal, which received byes to the elite round, were automatically seeded into Pot A. Each group contained one team from Pot A, one team from Pot B, one team from Pot C, and one team from Pot D. Winners and runners-up from the same qualifying round group could not be drawn in the same group, but the best third-placed teams could be drawn in the same group as winners or runners-up from the same qualifying round group.

Pos	Grp	Team	Pld	W	D	L	GF	GA	GD	Pts	Seeding
1	—	Germany	0	0	0	0	0	0	0	0	Pot A
2	—	Portugal	0	0	0	0	0	0	0	0	Pot A
3	11	Republic of Ireland	3	3	0	0	12	1	+11	9	Pot A
4	5	Serbia	3	3	0	0	12	3	+9	9	Pot A
5	6	France	3	3	0	0	10	2	+8	9	Pot A
6	1	Belgium	3	3	0	0	8	1	+7	9	Pot A
7	3	Israel	3	3	0	0	6	0	+6	9 (Note: Ranked by disciplinary points (Israel: 0 pts; Italy: 5 pts).)	Pot A
8	13	Italy	3	3	0	0	6	0	+6	9	Pot A
9	9	Hungary	3	3	0	0	6	2	+4	9	Pot B
10	10	Austria	3	3	0	0	5	1	+4	9	Pot B
11	12	Poland	3	2	1	0	10	1	+9	7	Pot B
12	2	Croatia	3	2	1	0	8	1	+7	7	Pot B
13	4	Finland	3	2	1	0	5	0	+5	7	Pot B
14	2	Spain	3	2	1	0	5	1	+4	7 (Note: Ranked by disciplinary points (Spain: 7 pts; Scotland: 8 pts).)	Pot B
15	7	Scotland	3	2	1	0	5	1	+4	7	Pot B
16	4	Iceland	3	2	1	0	4	0	+4	7	Pot B
17	7	Denmark	3	2	1	0	2	0	+2	7	Pot C
18	11	Ukraine	3	2	0	1	10	4	+6	6	Pot C
19	5	Greece	3	2	0	1	9	3	+6	6	Pot C
20	9	Netherlands	3	2	0	1	7	2	+5	6	Pot C
21	1	Switzerland	3	2	0	1	6	2	+4	6	Pot C
22	6	Slovenia	3	2	0	1	3	2	+1	6 (Note: Ranked by disciplinary points (Slovenia: 2 pts; Georgia: 8 pts).)	Pot C
23	13	Georgia	3	2	0	1	3	2	+1	6	Pot C
24	12	Sweden	3	1	2	0	11	2	+9	5	Pot C
25	8	Bosnia and Herzegovina	3	1	2	0	5	1	+4	5	Pot D
26	8	Slovakia	3	1	2	0	3	1	+2	5	Pot D
27	8	Macedonia (Y)	3	1	2	0	2	0	+2	5	Pot D
28	3	Czech Republic	3	1	1	1	8	3	+5	4	Pot D
29	12	Cyprus (Y)	3	1	1	1	6	2	+4	4	Pot D
30	3	Turkey (Y)	3	1	1	1	5	2	+3	4	Pot D
31	10	Romania	3	1	1	1	2	2	0	4	Pot D
32	5	Norway (Y)	3	1	0	2	11	3	+8	3	Pot D

Source: UEFA
Rules for classification: 1) points; 2) goal difference; 3) goals scored; 4) disciplinary points; 5) coefficient; 6) drawing of lots.
(Y) Third-placed teams from qualifying round (may be drawn with teams from same qualifying round group)

=== Groups ===
The elite round must be played by the end of March 2018.

Times up to 24 March 2018 are CET (UTC+1), thereafter times are CEST (UTC+2).

==== Group 1 ====
Pos	Team	Pld	W	D	L	GF	GA	GD	Pts	Qualification
1	Serbia	3	2	1	0	6	1	+5	7	Final tournament
2	Spain	3	1	2	0	4	2	+2	5	Final tournament
3	Ukraine	3	0	2	1	1	4	−3	2	
4	Czech Republic (H)	3	0	1	2	0	4	−4	1	

Source: UEFA
Rules for classification: Qualification tiebreakers
(H) Hosts
21 March 2018
14:30

Ukraine	1–1	Spain
Sikan 24'	Report	Touaizi 80+1'

Stadion FK Holice, Olomouc
Referee: Urs Schnyder (Switzerland)
21 March 2018
17:00

Serbia	2–0	Czech Republic
Savić 26', 35'	Report

Andrův stadion, Olomouc
Referee: Volen Chinkov (Bulgaria)

24 March 2018
14:30

Serbia	3–0 Awarded	Ukraine
Jočić 12'	Report	Sikan 32'; Mudryk 72'

Stadion Za Místním nádražím, Prostějov
Referee: Kristoffer Hagenes (Norway)

The Serbia v Ukraine match was completed with a score of 1–2 before a default victory was awarded to Serbia due to participation of disqualified Ukrainian players Mykola Yarosh and Roman Bodnia.

24 March 2018
17:00

Spain	2–0	Czech Republic
Mollejo 30'; Touaizi 63'	Report

Andrův stadion, Olomouc
Referee: Volen Chinkov (Bulgaria)

27 March 2018
14:30

Spain	1–1	Serbia
Gutiérrez 20' (pen.)	Report	Belić 33'

Stadion Za Místním nádražím, Prostějov
Referee: Kristoffer Hagenes (Norway)
27 March 2018
14:30

Czech Republic	0–0	Ukraine
	Report

Andrův stadion, Olomouc
Referee: Urs Schnyder (Switzerland)

==== Group 2 ====
Pos	Team	Pld	W	D	L	GF	GA	GD	Pts	Qualification
1	Sweden	3	1	2	0	1	0	+1	5	Final tournament
2	Belgium	3	1	1	1	3	3	0	4	Final tournament
3	Cyprus	3	0	3	0	2	2	0	3	
4	Croatia (H)	3	0	2	1	2	3	−1	2	

Source: UEFA
Rules for classification: Qualification tiebreakers
(H) Hosts
9 March 2018
12:30

Belgium	1–1	Cyprus
Lissens 65'	Report	Paroutis 6'

Stadion Kantrida, Rijeka
Referee: Eldorjan Hamiti (Albania)
9 March 2018
15:30

Sweden	0–0	Croatia
	Report

Stadion Aldo Drosina, Pula
Referee: Christopher Jaeger (Austria)

12 March 2018
12:00

Belgium	0–1	Sweden
	Report	Larsson 67'

Stadion Aldo Drosina, Pula
Referee: Nejc Kajtazovic (Slovenia)
12 March 2018
15:30

Croatia	1–1	Cyprus
Marin 60'	Report	Paroutis 76'

Stadion Kantrida, Rijeka
Referee: Christopher Jaeger (Austria)

15 March 2018
15:30

Croatia	1–2	Belgium
Vušković 67' (pen.)	Report	Ramazani 19'; Lissens 59'

Stadion Kantrida, Rijeka
Referee: Nejc Kajtazovic (Slovenia)
15 March 2018
15:30

Cyprus	0–0	Sweden
	Report

Stadion Žuknica, Kostrena
Referee: Eldorjan Hamiti (Albania)

==== Group 3 ====
Pos	Team	Pld	W	D	L	GF	GA	GD	Pts	Qualification
1	Republic of Ireland	3	3	0	0	6	0	+6	9	Final tournament
2	Georgia	3	1	1	1	8	5	+3	4	
3	Poland (H)	3	1	1	1	5	3	+2	4	
4	Macedonia	3	0	0	3	1	12	−11	0	

Source: UEFA
Rules for classification: Qualification tiebreakers
(H) Hosts
21 March 2018
17:30

Republic of Ireland	3–0	Macedonia
Idah 57' (pen.); Brennan 62'; Wright 69'	Report

Stadion Chrobrego Głogów, Głogów
Referee: Boris Marhefka (Slovakia)
21 March 2018
17:30

Georgia	2–2	Poland
Davitashvili 9' (pen.), 28' (pen.)	Report	Ma. Nawrocki 14'; Żukowski 56'

Stadion Miejski, Legnica
Referee: Ivar Orri Kristjansson (Iceland)

24 March 2018
17:30

Republic of Ireland	2–0	Georgia
Jangveladze 4' (o.g.); Brennan 33'	Report

Stadion Chrobrego Głogów, Głogów
Referee: Boris Marhefka (Slovakia)
24 March 2018
17:30

Poland	3–0	Macedonia
Żuk 30'; Bida 67'; Richert 73'	Report

Stadion Miejski, Legnica
Referee: Christophe Pires (Luxembourg)

27 March 2018
16:00

Poland	0–1	Republic of Ireland
	Report	Parrott 48' (pen.)

Stadion Miejski, Legnica
Referee: Ivar Orri Kristjansson (Iceland)
27 March 2018
16:00

Macedonia	1–6	Georgia
Toshevski 80+1'	Report	Davitashvili 4', 11', 16', 45' (pen.); Trpčevski 31' (o.g.); Kvaratskhelia 64'

Stadion Chrobrego Głogów, Głogów
Referee: Christophe Pires (Luxembourg)

==== Group 4 ====
Pos	Team	Pld	W	D	L	GF	GA	GD	Pts	Qualification
1	Switzerland	3	2	1	0	7	4	+3	7	Final tournament
2	Portugal (H)	3	2	1	0	5	2	+3	7	Final tournament
3	Finland	3	1	0	2	3	5	−2	3	
4	Slovakia	3	0	0	3	4	8	−4	0	

Source: UEFA
Rules for classification: Qualification tiebreakers
(H) Hosts
12 March 2018
15:00

Switzerland	2–1	Finland
Vonmoos 32'; Sauter 52'	Report	Tolonen 39'

Estádio da Madeira, Funchal
Referee: Vitaliy Romanov (Ukraine)
12 March 2018
17:00

Portugal	2–1	Slovakia
Correia 11'; Saldanha 80+4'	Report	Iľko 56'

Centro Desportivo da Madeira, Ribeira Brava
Referee: Nicholas Walsh (Scotland)

15 March 2018
15:00

Finland	2–1	Slovakia
Tolonen 21' (pen.); Ablade 66'	Report	Strelec 8'

Estádio Municipal de Machico, Machico
Referee: Kári Jóannesarson Á Høvdanum (Faroe Islands)
15 March 2018
17:00

Portugal	1–1	Switzerland
Ribeiro 69'	Report	Tushi 11'

Estádio do Marítimo, Funchal
Referee: Nicholas Walsh (Scotland)

18 March 2018
17:00

Finland	0–2	Portugal
	Report	Nurmi 21' (o.g.); Costa 36' (pen.)

Estádio do Marítimo, Funchal
Referee: Vitaliy Romanov (Ukraine)
18 March 2018
17:00

Slovakia	2–4	Switzerland
Pokorny 11', 55'	Report	Tushi 21'; Vonmoos 30'; Witzig 57'; Werthmüller 80+6'

Centro Desportivo da Madeira, Ribeira Brava
Referee: Kári Jóannesarson Á Høvdanum (Faroe Islands)

==== Group 5 ====
Pos	Team	Pld	W	D	L	GF	GA	GD	Pts	Qualification
1	Netherlands (H)	3	3	0	0	6	1	+5	9	Final tournament
2	Italy	3	2	0	1	3	2	+1	6	Final tournament
3	Turkey	3	1	0	2	3	4	−1	3	
4	Iceland	3	0	0	3	1	6	−5	0	

Source: UEFA
Rules for classification: Qualification tiebreakers
(H) Hosts
7 March 2018
16:00

Netherlands	2–1	Iceland
Redan 2', 36'	Report	Guðjohnsen 57' (pen.)

Sportpark De Watertoren, Zaltbommel
Referee: Yigal Frid (Israel)
7 March 2018
19:00

Italy	2–0	Turkey
Colombo 61'; Ricci 67'	Report

Sportpark De Hanen Weide, Veen
Referee: Julian Weinberger (Austria)

10 March 2018
14:00

Iceland	0–3	Turkey
	Report	Kaya 9'; Güllü 63'; Luş 79'

Sportpark Parkzicht, Uden
Referee: Rohit Saggi (Norway)
10 March 2018
17:00

Italy	0–2	Netherlands
	Report	Thomas 37'; Redan 80'

Sportpark Zuideinderpark, Schijndel
Referee: Julian Weinberger (Austria)

13 March 2018
19:00

Iceland	0–1	Italy
	Report	Ponsi 50'

Sportpark Zuideinderpark, Schijndel
Referee: Yigal Frid (Israel)
13 March 2018
19:00

Turkey	0–2	Netherlands
	Report	Llansana 51'; Ihattaren 71'

Sportpark Parkzicht, Uden
Referee: Rohit Saggi (Norway)

==== Group 6 ====
Pos	Team	Pld	W	D	L	GF	GA	GD	Pts	Qualification
1	Bosnia and Herzegovina	3	2	0	1	4	4	0	6 (Note: Head-to-head result: Bosnia and Herzegovina 1–0 Denmark.)	Final tournament
2	Denmark	3	2	0	1	3	2	+1	6	Final tournament
3	France	3	1	1	1	4	2	+2	4	
4	Austria (H)	3	0	1	2	1	4	−3	1	

Source: UEFA
Rules for classification: Qualification tiebreakers
(H) Hosts
Notes:
21 March 2018
11:00

France	3–0	Bosnia and Herzegovina
Da Cunha 22'; Gboho 44'; Begraoui 73'	Report

Thermenstadion, Bad Waltersdorf
Referee: Timotheos Christofi (Cyprus)
21 March 2018
18:30

Denmark	1–0	Austria
Isaksen 70'	Report

Gansbärenstadion, Rohrbach an der Lafnitz
Referee: Kristoffer Karlsson (Sweden)

24 March 2018
11:00

France	1–2	Denmark
Begraoui 49'	Report	Isaksen 31'; Rose-Villadsen 78'

Gansbärenstadion, Rohrbach an der Lafnitz
Referee: Lionel Tschudi (Switzerland)
24 March 2018
18:30

Austria	1–3	Bosnia and Herzegovina
Monsberger 57'	Report	Badžak 53'; Hasić 55'; Mujić 80+4'

Thermenstadion, Bad Waltersdorf
Referee: Kristoffer Karlsson (Sweden)

27 March 2018
18:30

Austria	0–0	France
	Report

Gansbärenstadion, Rohrbach an der Lafnitz
Referee: Lionel Tschudi (Switzerland)
27 March 2018
18:30

Bosnia and Herzegovina	1–0	Denmark
Mehić 67'	Report

Thermenstadion, Bad Waltersdorf
Referee: Timotheos Christofi (Cyprus)

==== Group 7 ====
Pos	Team	Pld	W	D	L	GF	GA	GD	Pts	Qualification
1	Slovenia	3	2	1	0	6	2	+4	7	Final tournament
2	Israel	3	2	0	1	6	4	+2	6	Final tournament
3	Hungary (H)	3	1	1	1	3	2	+1	4	
4	Romania	3	0	0	3	2	9	−7	0	

Source: UEFA
Rules for classification: Qualification tiebreakers
(H) Hosts
22 March 2018
14:00

Israel	5–1	Romania
Jauabra 40', 61', 64'; Ovadia 48'; Davida 80+2'	Report	Alexandru 57'

Pancho Aréna Pitch 4, Felcsút
Referee: Petri Viljanen (Finland)
22 March 2018
14:00

Slovenia	1–1	Hungary
Svetlin 57' (pen.)	Report	Tóth-Gábor 80'

Hévízi úti Stadion, Budapest
Referee: Milovan Milačić (Montenegro)

25 March 2018
14:00

Israel	0–3	Slovenia
	Report	Prelec 32'; Burin 54'; Urbančič 67'

Üllői Városi Sporttelep, Üllő
Referee: Roomer Tarajev (Estonia)
25 March 2018
14:00

Hungary	2–0	Romania
Beke 29' (pen.); Tóth-Gábor 49'	Report

Hévízi úti Stadion, Budapest
Referee: Petri Viljanen (Finland)

28 March 2018
14:00

Hungary	0–1	Israel
	Report	Vida 43' (o.g.)

Hidegkuti Nándor Stadion, Budapest
Referee: Milovan Milačić (Montenegro)
28 March 2018
14:00

Romania	1–2	Slovenia
Nitu 67'	Report	Svetlin 51', 75'

Üllői Városi Sporttelep, Üllő
Referee: Roomer Tarajev (Estonia)

==== Group 8 ====
Pos	Team	Pld	W	D	L	GF	GA	GD	Pts	Qualification
1	Norway	3	2	1	0	7	3	+4	7	Final tournament
2	Germany	3	1	1	1	5	3	+2	4	Final tournament
3	Greece (H)	3	1	0	2	1	6	−5	3 (Note: Head-to-head result: Greece 1–0 Scotland.)	
4	Scotland	3	1	0	2	2	3	−1	3	

Source: UEFA
Rules for classification: Qualification tiebreakers
(H) Hosts
Notes:
21 March 2018
11:00

Germany	2–2	Norway
Katterbach 9'; Aidonis 52'	Report	Kitolano 16'; Holm 80+4'

Pampeloponnisiako Stadium, Patras
Referee: Admir Šehović (Bosnia and Herzegovina)
21 March 2018
15:00

Greece	1–0	Scotland
Fakkis 56'	Report

Pampeloponnisiako Stadium, Patras
Referee: Igor Pajac (Croatia)

24 March 2018
11:00

Scotland	1–2	Norway
Gilmour 37'	Report	Hansen 54'; Aga 72'

Pampeloponnisiako Stadium, Patras
Referee: Denys Shurman (Ukraine)
24 March 2018
15:00

Germany	3–0	Greece
Batista Meier 24' (pen.); Pohlmann 76'; Katterbach 80+1'	Report

Kostas Davourlis Stadium, Patras
Referee: Igor Pajac (Croatia)

27 March 2018
14:00

Scotland	1–0	Germany
Awokoya-Mebude 57'	Report

Papacharalambeio National Stadium, Nafpaktos
Referee: Admir Šehović (Bosnia and Herzegovina)
27 March 2018
14:00

Norway	3–0	Greece
Hansen 44', 57'; Askildsen 80+3'	Report

Pampeloponnisiako Stadium, Patras
Referee: Denys Shurman (Ukraine)

=== Ranking of second-placed teams ===
To determine the seven best second-placed teams from the elite round which qualify for the final tournament, only the results of the second-placed teams against the first and third-placed teams in their group are taken into account.

Pos	Grp	Team	Pld	W	D	L	GF	GA	GD	Pts	Qualification
1	8	Germany	2	1	1	0	5	2	+3	4	Final tournament
2	4	Portugal	2	1	1	0	3	1	+2	4	Final tournament
3	6	Denmark	2	1	0	1	2	2	0	3 (Note: Ranked by disciplinary points (Denmark: 3 pts; Italy: 5 pts).)	Final tournament
4	5	Italy	2	1	0	1	2	2	0	3	Final tournament
5	7	Israel	2	1	0	1	1	3	−2	3	Final tournament
6	1	Spain	2	0	2	0	2	2	0	2	Final tournament
7	2	Belgium	2	0	1	1	1	2	−1	1	Final tournament
8	3	Georgia	2	0	1	1	2	4	−2	1	

Source: UEFA
Rules for classification: 1) points; 2) goal difference; 3) goals scored; 4) disciplinary points; 5) coefficient; 6) drawing of lots.

== Qualified teams ==
The following 16 teams qualified for the final tournament.

Team	Qualified as	Qualified on	Previous appearances in Under-17 Euro^{1} only U-17 era (since 2002)
England	Hosts	26 January 2015	12 (2002, 2003, 2004, 2005, 2007, 2009, **2010**, 2011, **2014**, 2015, 2016, 2017)
Serbia	Elite round Group 1 winners	27 March 2018	6 (2002^{2}, 2006^{3}, 2008, 2011, 2016, 2017)
Sweden	Elite round Group 2 winners	15 March 2018	2 (2013, 2016)
Republic of Ireland	Elite round Group 3 winners	24 March 2018	3 (2008, 2015, 2017)
Switzerland	Elite round Group 4 winners	18 March 2018	7 (**2002**, 2005, 2008, 2009, 2010, 2013, 2014)
Netherlands	Elite round Group 5 winners	13 March 2018	11 (2002, 2005, 2007, 2008, 2009, **2011**, **2012**, 2014, 2015, 2016, 2017)
Bosnia and Herzegovina	Elite round Group 6 winners	27 March 2018	2 (2016, 2017)
Slovenia	Elite round Group 7 winners	28 March 2018	2 (2012, 2015)
Norway	Elite round Group 8 winners	27 March 2018	1 (2017)
Germany	Elite round best seven runners-up	27 March 2018	10 (2002, 2006, 2007, **2009**, 2011, 2012, 2014, 2015, 2016, 2017)
Portugal	Elite round best seven runners-up	18 March 2018	6 (2002, **2003**, 2004, 2010, 2014, **2016**)
Denmark	Elite round best seven runners-up	27 March 2018	4 (2002, 2003, 2011, 2016)
Italy	Elite round best seven runners-up	15 March 2018	7 (2003, 2005, 2009, 2013, 2015, 2016, 2017)
Israel	Elite round best seven runners-up	28 March 2018	2 (2003, 2005)
Spain	Elite round best seven runners-up	27 March 2018	11 (2002, 2003, 2004, 2006, **2007**, **2008**, 2009, 2010, 2015, 2016, **2017**)
Belgium	Elite round best seven runners-up	27 March 2018	5 (2006, 2007, 2012, 2015, 2016)

^{1} Bold indicates champions for that year. Italic indicates hosts for that year.
^{2} As Yugoslavia
^{3} As Serbia and Montenegro

== Goalscorers ==
8 goals

- (Republic of Ireland) Adam Idah

7 goals

- (Georgia (country)) Zuriko Davitashvili
- (Netherlands) Daishawn Redan
- (Norway) Kornelius Norman Hansen

6 goals

- (France) Mohamed Lamine Diaby
- (Norway) Oscar Aga

4 goals

- (Bosnia and Herzegovina) Ajdin Hasić
- (Greece) Panagiotis Tzimas
- (Hungary) Kristóf Tóth-Gábor
- (Serbia) Milutin Vidosavljević
- (Spain) Nabil Touaizi
- (Sweden) Benjamin Nygren
- (Ukraine) Danylo Sikan

3 goals

- (Albania) Kleis Bozhanaj
- (Austria) Marcel Monsberger
- (Belarus) Maksim Kapraliou
- (Croatia) Antonio Marin
- (Croatia) Mario Vušković
- (Cyprus) Daniil Paroutis
- (Finland) Terry Ablade
- (Finland) Maximo Tolonen
- (France) Lucas Da Cunha
- (Georgia (country)) Khvicha Kvaratskhelia
- (Iceland) Andri Guðjohnsen
- (Israel) Ibrahim Jauabra
- (Israel) Ofek Ovadia
- (Poland) Jakub Karbownik
- (Republic of Ireland) Sean Brennan
- (Serbia) Martin Novaković
- (Slovenia) Nik Prelec
- (Slovenia) Tamar Svetlin
- (Sweden) Julian Larsson
- (Switzerland) Uros Vasic
- (Switzerland) Julian Vonmoos
- (Ukraine) Mykhailo Mudryk

2 goals

- (Azerbaijan) Turan Valizada
- (Belgium) Gabriel Lemoine
- (Belgium) Lucas Lissens
- (Belgium) Yorbe Vertessen
- (Bosnia and Herzegovina) Denil Badžak
- (Croatia) Tomislav Krizmanić
- (Czech Republic) Matyáš Kozák
- (Denmark) Gustav Tang Isaksen
- (Finland) Elias Mastokangas
- (France) Yanis Begraoui
- (Germany) Noah Katterbach
- (Greece) Konstantinos Thymianis
- (Greece) Georgios Vrakas
- (Hungary) Péter Beke
- (Iceland) Stefan Ingi Sigurdarson
- (Israel) Liel Abada
- (Italy) Nicolò Fagioli
- (Italy) Davide Ghislandi
- (Poland) Bartosz Bida
- (Poland) Paweł Żuk
- (Republic of Ireland) Tyreik Samuel Wright
- (Romania) Marian Dumitru Alexandru
- (Scotland) Billy Gilmour
- (Scotland) Marc Leonard
- (Serbia) Dragoljub Savić
- (Slovakia) Peter Pokorny
- (Spain) Sergio Camello
- (Switzerland) Tician Tushi
- (Turkey) Mustafa Kaya
- (Ukraine) Vikentiy Voloshyn

1 goal

- (Albania) Emiliano Bullari
- (Albania) Astrit Rama
- (Andorra) Alex Alonso Guerrero
- (Austria) Amir Abdijanovic
- (Austria) Martin Moormann
- (Austria) Lukas Schöfl
- (Azerbaijan) Ismayil Zulfugarli
- (Belarus) Dzianis Milasheuski
- (Belgium) Antoine Colassin
- (Belgium) Lars Dendoncker
- (Belgium) Largie Ramazani
- (Belgium) Laurens Symons
- (Belgium) Halim Timassi
- (Bosnia and Herzegovina) Alen Mehić
- (Bosnia and Herzegovina) Edin Mujić
- (Bosnia and Herzegovina) Kristijan Stanić
- (Bulgaria) Vladimir Nikolov
- (Croatia) Ivan Brnić
- (Croatia) Ivan Šarić
- (Cyprus) Michalis Constantinidis
- (Cyprus) Charis Kapsos
- (Cyprus) Rafail Mamas
- (Cyprus) Dimitris Raspas
- (Cyprus) Agapios Vrikkis
- (Czech Republic) David Eichler
- (Czech Republic) Filip Firbacher
- (Czech Republic) Šimon Gabriel
- (Czech Republic) Jan Holzer
- (Czech Republic) Ladislav Krobot
- (Denmark) Andreas Pyndt Andersen
- (Denmark) Muamer Brajanac
- (Denmark) Oliver Marc Rose-Villadsen
- (France) Yann Gboho
- (France) Loïc Mbe Soh
- (Germany) Antonis Aidonis
- (Germany) Oliver Batista Meier
- (Germany) Ole Pohlmann
- (Greece) Ioannis Fakkis
- (Greece) Pavlos Mavroudis
- (Hungary) Dominik Cipf
- (Hungary) Tibor Csala
- (Hungary) Benedek Varju
- (Israel) Hanan Hen Biton
- (Israel) Osher Davida
- (Israel) Omri Ram
- (Italy) Lorenzo Colombo
- (Italy) Fabio Ponsi
- (Italy) Alessio Riccardi
- (Italy) Samuele Ricci
- (Italy) Edoardo Vergani
- (Kazakhstan) Stanislav Basmanov
- (Kosovo) Florian Hysenaj
- (Kosovo) Albin Prapashtica
- (Latvia) Renārs Varslavāns
- (Lithuania) Ernestas Andriušis
- (Lithuania) Lukas Juodkūnaitis
- (Lithuania) Vilius Piliukaitis
- (Luxembourg) Clayton Duarte
- (Luxembourg) Tun Held
- (North Macedonia) Vlada Novevski
- (North Macedonia) Vane Tasevski
- (North Macedonia) David Toshevski
- (Malta) Alexander Satariano
- (Montenegro) Nikša Vujanović
- (Netherlands) Mohammed Ihattaren
- (Netherlands) Enric Llansana
- (Netherlands) Nigel Thomas
- (Netherlands) Arjen van der Heide
- (Netherlands) Joshua Zirkzee
- (Northern Ireland) Ben Wilson
- (Norway) Kristoffer Askildsen
- (Norway) Josef Brian Baccay
- (Norway) Sander Johan Christiansen
- (Norway) Noah Jean Holm
- (Norway) Joshua Gaston Kitolano
- (Poland) Szymon Czyż
- (Poland) Michał Karbownik
- (Poland) Olaf Kobacki
- (Poland) Maik Nawrocki
- (Poland) Mikołaj Nawrocki
- (Poland) Patryk Richert
- (Poland) Mateusz Żukowski
- (Portugal) Félix Correia
- (Portugal) Nuno Costa
- (Portugal) Eduardo Ribeiro
- (Portugal) Francisco Saldanha
- (Republic of Ireland) Barry Coffey
- (Republic of Ireland) Max Murphy
- (Republic of Ireland) Adam O'Reilly
- (Republic of Ireland) Troy Parrott
- (Romania) Luis Emanuel Nitu
- (Romania) Antonio Vlad
- (Russia) Leonid Gerchikov
- (Russia) Maksim Kutovoy
- (Russia) Maksim Petrov
- (Scotland) Adedapo Awokoya-Mebude
- (Scotland) Dean Campbell
- (Scotland) Jamie Semple
- (Serbia) Kristijan Belić
- (Serbia) Borisav Burmaz
- (Serbia) Ivan Ilić
- (Serbia) Bogdan Jočić
- (Serbia) Lazar Pavlović
- (Serbia) Danilo Mitrović
- (Serbia) Luka Velikić
- (Slovakia) Ján Bernát
- (Slovakia) Oliver Burian
- (Slovakia) Patrik Iľko
- (Slovakia) Samuel Lavrinčík
- (Slovakia) Dávid Strelec
- (Slovenia) Matija Burin
- (Slovenia) Renato Simič
- (Slovenia) Jošt Urbančič
- (Spain) Roberto González
- (Spain) Miguel Gutiérrez
- (Spain) Víctor Mollejo
- (Sweden) Helmer Andersson
- (Sweden) Fredrik Hammar
- (Sweden) Jack Lahne
- (Sweden) Amel Mujanic
- (Sweden) Rasmus Wikström
- (Switzerland) Felix Mambimbi
- (Switzerland) Ilan Sauter
- (Switzerland) Simon Sohm
- (Switzerland) Ruwen Werthmüller
- (Switzerland) Christian Witzig
- (Turkey) Barışcan Işık Altunbaş
- (Turkey) Serkan Bakan
- (Turkey) Abdulkadir Çelik
- (Turkey) Fırat Güllü
- (Turkey) Atakan Gündüz
- (Turkey) Süleyman Luş
- (Ukraine) Alan Aussi
- (Ukraine) Stanislav Biblyk
- (Ukraine) Artem Shulianskyi
- (Ukraine) Roman Yakuba
- (Wales) Isaak Davies
- (Wales) Joshua Hosie
- (Wales) Callum Watts

1 own goal

- (Armenia) Arman Ghazaryan (against Czech Republic)
- (Belarus) Uladzislau Belashevich (against France)
- (Finland) Noah Nurmi (against Portugal)
- (Georgia (country)) Elguja Jangveladze (against Republic of Ireland)
- (Hungary) Kristóf Vida (against Israel)
- (North Macedonia) Kristijan Trpčevski (against Georgia)
- (Russia) Maksim Kutovoy (against Faroe Islands)
- (San Marino) Andrea Contadini (against Poland)
- (Wales) Keenan Pattern (against The Netherlands)

Source: UEFA.com
