= Hysenaj =

Hysenaj is a surname of Albanian origin. Notable people with the surname include:

- Emir Hysenaj, Albanian-born bank employee, best known as the inside man in the 2006 Securitas depot robbery
- Florian Hysenaj (born 2001), Kosovar footballer
