= FC Stade Nyonnais =

Swiss football club

- Full name: Football Club Stade Nyonnais
- Nicknames: Les "Jaune et noir" (The Yellow and Blacks); Les Nyonnais
- Founded: 29 October 1905; 120 years ago as Bluet
- Ground: Stade de Colovray, Nyon
- Capacity: 7,200 (860 seated)
- Owner: Michael Palma
- President: Michael Palma (SA); Varujan Symonov & Sassoun Simarkes (association)
- Head Coach: Aurélien Mioch
- League: Challenge League
- 2025–26: 9th of 10
- Website: www.fcstadenyonnais-sa.ch www.stadenyonnais.ch
Home colours	Away colours

FC Stade Nyonnais is an association football club based in the town of Nyon, Switzerland. The team currently competes in the Challenge League, the second tier of the Swiss football league system and plays its home matches at Stade de Colovray, where it has been since 1991. Founded in 1905, it is nicknamed the "jaune et noir" (which translates to "yellow and black") and affiliated to the Vaud Cantonal Football Association.

== History ==
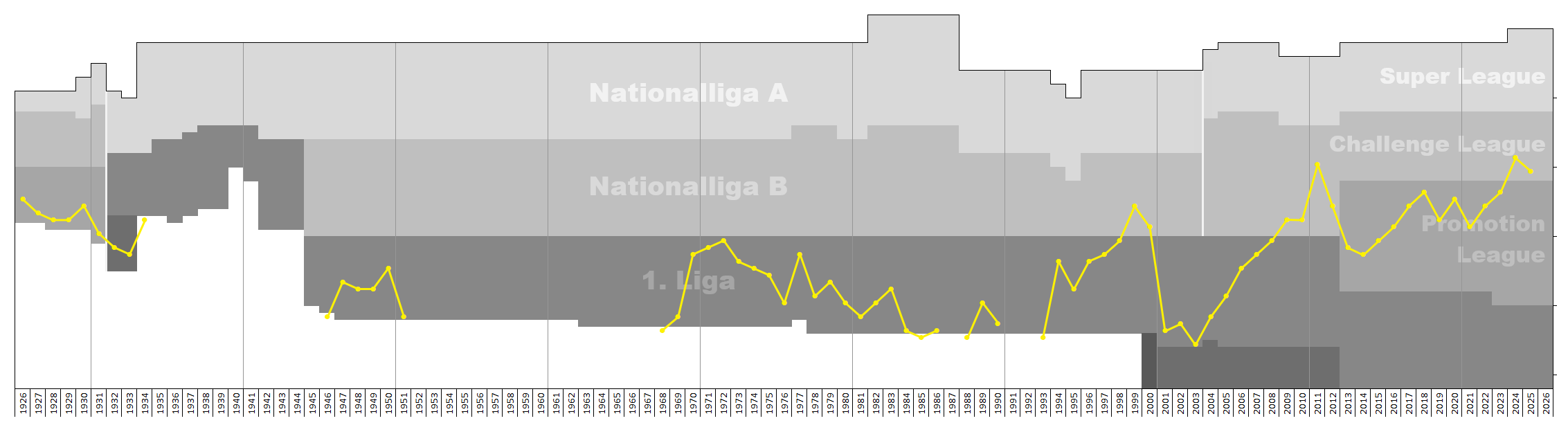
Chart of Stade Nyonnais table positions in the Swiss football league system from 1946 onwards

FC Stade Nyonnais was founded in 1905 by then-teenagers Oscar Aeby, Edmond Delay, Emile Aeby and Pierre Robin as Bluet. Football was rapidly popularising in Nyon and Switzerland at the start of the 20th Century and the club was one of many emerging football teams in the town along with FC Nyon (who were the first club in Nyon), Fortuna Nyon, Nyon-Sport, Nyon FC, and Rive. They initially played their home games at a courtyard of a local Catholic church in Nyon. The pitch dimensions, however, did not meet requirements and they therefore relocated to Place Perdtemps (now converted into a car park) in 1906. Their stay there ended swiftly as the local authorities took issue with allowing a group of boys (their oldest player was 18 at the time) playing football in a public space. The club played their first 4 seasons in the Coup de Léman; a competition created by FC Nyon in which all clubs in Romandy competed in. After undergoing several name changes, the club had eventually settled on FC Stade Nyonnais by 1907. 2 years later, Stade Nyonnais were admitted to the Association Cantonale Vaudoise de Football; the regional football association of the Vaud canton in which Nyon is located. The club competed in the second tier of the competition and proceeded to win their first title when they were crowned champions of the division in 1910. Les Nyonnais, as they are often referred as, joined the Swiss Football Association in 1918 following the end of World War I.

By 1924, the club moved away from Place Perdtemps and began to play their matches at a newly built ground in Marens, Nyon (the land is now in use by local secondary school Ecole Secondaire de Nyon-Marens). In 1925, the team earned promotion to the second tier of Swiss football after being crowned regional champions of Romandy (French-speaking region of Switzerland) and would proceed to remain in the league for the subsequent six years. The same year, they competed in the inaugural Swiss Cup tournament in which they reached the round of 16. In 1926, Jean Wirz, who was elected Stade Nyonnais president the following decade, formed a youth academy for the club.

By 1946, Stade Nyonnais gained promotion back to the third tier of Swiss football (Première Ligue)^{A} in which they survived for the subsequent four years. Relegation from the Première Ligue saw them compete in the fourth tier of Swiss football and the fans awaited 17 years to see their team back in the Première Ligue.

1991 marked the opening year of the club's current stadium Stade Colovray.

In 2001 the club had a big game against Real Madrid, in which they reached a record attendance of 6,800 spectators. High-profile players such as Zinedine Zidane participated in the match.

The club enjoyed their best ever Swiss Cup run in 2007 when they managed to reach the quarter-finals. The tournament came to an end for Les Nyonnais in a 2–0 defeat to top-tier side FC Basel.

Nyon had survived several seasons in the second tier of Swiss football, the Challenge League, until the 2011–12 season. Due to restructuring of the Swiss Football League, it was announced that the bottom 6 teams of the 10 team division would be relegated to a newly formed division in 2012, rather than the usual two teams being relegated. Nyon was close to survival but finished two points from safety, and were relegated to the Promotion League. They have remained in the league ever since.

They returned to the Swiss Challenge League for the 2023–24 season, gaining promotion as the third placed team in the 2022–23 Swiss Promotion League. It will be their first season in the second tier of Switzerland, after eleven years of absence.

== Club colours ==
Stade Nyonnais (then Bluet) initially wore yellow and black stripes with white shorts

FC Stade Nyonnais' colours have been black and yellow ever since the club's foundation in 1905. It is established historically through archival documents that said colours were adopted by the founders as a tribute to BSC Young Boys who were crowned Swiss champions in 1903. The yellow and black also distinguished them from the colours of FC Nyon United (now defunct) who played their matches in the same city.

=== Misconceptions surrounding Jean Wirz ===
Bern-born Jean Wirz is often credited as the founder of Stade Nyonnais and the reason behind their yellow and black colour. This claim, however, is not supported by historical evidence. Wirz, who was involved in Nyon sports circles for almost half a century, only settled in Nyon in April 1920. He formed the youth section of the club in 1926 before taking up the role of vice-president in 1930. After a 5-year vice-presidency, he operated as club president from 1935 to 1937.

== Current squad ==
As of 3 September 2026

No.	Pos.	Nation	Player
1	GK	SUI	Mirco Mazzeo
2	DF	SUI	Rayan Boulac
3	DF	SUI	Edian Gashi (on loan from Sion)
4	DF	SUI	Samuel Fankhauser (on loan from Servette)
5	MF	SUI	Joël Mandaka
6	MF	SUI	Fabulus Ahuissou (on loan from Lausanne-Sport)
7	MF	SUI	Francesco Lentini (on loan from Neuchâtel Xamax)
8	MF	POR	Lucas Ribeiro
9	FW	SUI	Mardochée Miguel (on loan from Servette)
10	MF	ALB	Burak Alili (on loan from Sion)
11	FW	KOS	Florian Hysenaj
15	DF	SUI	Noah Grognuz (on loan from Sion)
17	MF	SUI	Émilien Ndjoko (on loan from Servette)
19	FW	SUI	Mohamed Ishuayed

No.	Pos.	Nation	Player
21	FW	POR	Gonçalo Figueiredo
22	DF	SUI	Ethan Brandy
23	DF	HAI	Keeto Thermoncy
24	MF	FRA	Clément Betoubam
25	DF	SUI	Thierno Diallo
26	DF	ESP	Georges Gomis
27	FW	SUI	Shahin Edougué
29	GK	SUI	Bozidar Vukovic
40	GK	SUI	Marwan Aubert (on loan from Servette)
42	MF	CIV	Edmond Akichi
66	DF	SUI	Romeo Philippin (on loan from Servette)
70	FW	SUI	Ruben Londja (on loan from Sion)
75	MF	SUI	Pierrick Moulin (on loan from Sion)
91	FW	SUI	Matteo Regillo

=== Out on loan ===
Note: Flags indicate national team as defined under FIFA eligibility rules; some limited exceptions apply. Players may hold more than one non-FIFA nationality.

No.	Pos.	Nation	Player
—	MF	SUI	Sevan Gigantino (at USI Azzurri until 30 June 2027)

== Backroom staff and club committee members ==
=== First team staff ===
Position	Name
Head coach	Andrea Binotto
Assistant head coach	Gilles Dernier
Goalkeeping coach	Jean-Claude Richter
Club Masseuse	Cédric Pouilly
Physiotherapist	Arnaud Chartier
Social Media Manager	Florian Gardennot

=== Central committee ===
==== FC Stade Nyonnais SA ====
Position	Name
President	Michael Palma
General Manager	Joseph Guyot
Academy manager	Grégory Chardennet
Club secretary	Mathieu Brunner
Sponsoring director	Maurice Duval

== List of presidents ==
- 1905–1908 : Emile Aeby
- 1908–1910 : Célestin Bidal
- 1910–1912 : Henri Jonneret
- 1912 : Eugène Dorier
- 1912–1916 : Charles Memboury
- 1916–1919 : Henri Baillif
- 1919–1920 : Francis Lecomte
- 1920–1921 : Engène Alvasi
- 1921–1922 : Charles Memboury
- 1922–1924 : Emile Wirth
- 1924–1925 : Armand Froidevaux
- 1925–1931 : Emile Filletaz
- 1931–1933 : William Reguin
- 1933–1935 : Georges Favre
- 1935–1937 : Jean Wirz
- 1937–1939 : François Chaulmontet
- 1939–1940 : Georges Borlat
- 1940–1942 : Jean Pavillon
- 1942–1945 : Jean Wirz
- 1945–1949 : Robert Mayor
- 1949–1951 : Charles Rauss
- 1951–1953 : Robert Mayor
- 1953–1958 : Henri Wenger
- 1958–1959 : Roger Pelichet
- 1959–1971 : Gilbert Prodolliet
- 1971–1973 : Raymond Maget
- 1973–1976 : Bernard Bruch
- 1976–1981 : Marcel Gaille
- 1981–1984 : Bernard Bruch
- 1984–1990 : Gabriel Guillot
- 1990–1994 : Maurice Campiche
- 1994–2000 : Jean-François Kurz
- 2000–2001 : Gabriel Guillot
- 2001–2003 : Roland Brunner
- 2003–2009 : Daniel Perroud
- 2009–2010 : Giuseppe Luongo
- 2010–2012 : Didier Henriod
- 2012–2014 : Viviane Freymond
- 2014 : Claude Savioz
- 2014–2015 : Mirko Müller
- 2015 : Philippe Mortge
- 2015–2022 : Vartan Sirmakes
- 2022– : Varujan Symonov & Sassoun Simarkes (association)
- 2023- : Michel Palma (SA)

== List of head coaches ==
Below is a list of current and former Stade Nyonnais head coaches since 1965.

- 1965 : Albert Cleusix
- 1965-1968 : Albert Tachet
- 1968 : Gérard Penel
- 1968-1973 : Pierrot Georgy
- 1973-1974 : Henri Briffod
- 1974 : Bernard Jeanprost
- 1974-1977 : Pierrot Georgy
- 1977-1978 : Henri Gillet
- 1978-1980 : Franco Baciocchi
- 1980-1984 : Pierrot Georgy
- 1984-1987 : Claude Marietan
- 1987-1989 : Michel Carluccio
- 1989-1990 : Roger Defago
- 1990 : Steve Malbaski
- 1990-1991 : Hansjörg "Joko" Pfister
- 1991-1995 : Peter Pazmandy
- 1995 : Pierre-Albert Tachet
- 1995-1997 : Marco Schällibaum
- 1997-2000 : Christophe Moulin
- 2000-2001 : Gustave Ostermann
- 2001-2002 : Patrice Roggli
- 2002-2003 : Pierre-Albert Tachet
- 2003 : Pablo Huigueras
- 2003-2005 : Luca Ippoliti
- 2005-2006 : Arpad Soos
- 2006-2007 : Christian Zermatten
- 2007-2009 : Arpad Soos
- 2009-2010 : Frantz Barriquand
- 2010-2011 : John Dragani
- 2011-2012 : Jean-Michel Aeby
- 2012-2015 : Bernardo Hernandez
- 2015-2016 : Sébastien Bichard
- 2016 : Vittorio Bevilacqua
- 2016-2018 : Oscar Londono
- 2018-2019 : John Dragani
- 2019 : Ricardo Dionisio
- 2020-2022 : Anthony Braizat
- 2022-2024 : Christophe Caschili
- 2025- : Andrea Binotto (current)

== Honours ==
- Swiss Promotion League
  - Runners-up (1): 2022–23

== Footnotes ==
^A From 1946 to 2003, 'Ligue National A' referred to the top tier of Swiss football, 'Ligue National B' referred to the second tier of Swiss football, and 'Première Ligue' referred to the third tier of Swiss football.
