= Keeto Thermoncy =

Haitian footballer (born 2006)

Personal information
- Date of birth: 29 March 2006 (age 20)
- Place of birth: Fribourg, Switzerland
- Height: 1.85 m (6 ft 1 in)
- Position: Centre-back

Team information
- Current team: Nyon
- Number: 23

Youth career
- Fribourg
- 2018–2020: Team AFF-FFV
- 2020–2023: Young Boys

Senior career*
Years	Team	Apps	(Gls)
2023–	Young Boys U21	40	(4)
2025	Young Boys	0	(0)
2026–	Nyon	1	(0)

International career^{‡}
2025–	Haiti	1	(0)
- * Club domestic league appearances and goals as of 30 September 2026 ‡ National team caps and goals as of 23:14, 9 October 2025 (UTC)

Keeto Thermoncy (born 29 March 2006) is a professional footballer who plays as a centre-back for Swiss Challenge League club Nyon. Born in Switzerland, he plays for the Haiti national team.

== Club career ==
Thermoncy is a youth product of Fribourg, Team AFF-FFV and Young Boys. He was promoted to their U21 team in the Promotion League in 2023. He was registered for Young Boys' senior squad for the 2025–26 UEFA Europa League campaign.

== International career ==
Born in Switzerland, Thermoncy was born to a Haitian father and Swiss mother and holds dual Swiss and Haitian citizenship. He was first called up to the Swiss U14s, but the camp was cancelled due to the COVID-19 pandemic. He was called up to a training camp for the Haiti U17s in November 2022. In June 2024, he was called up to the preliminary Haiti U20s for qualifiers for the 2025 FIFA U-20 World Cup.

He was called up to the Haiti senior national team for a set of 2026 FIFA World Cup qualification matches in October 2025. He won his first cap with Haiti on 9 October, featuring in a 3–0 win over Nicaragua.

On 15 May 2026, he was included in Haiti head coach Sébastien Migné's 26-man squad for the 2026 FIFA World Cup.

== Personal life ==
Keeto's younger brother, Wasson Thermoncy, is also a footballer and Haiti youth international.

== Career statistics ==
=== Club ===
As of match played 25 October 2025

Appearances and goals by club, season and competition
Club	Season	League			Cup		Europe		Other		Total	
Club	Season	Division	Apps	Goals	Apps	Goalss	Apps	Goals	Apps	Goals	Apps	Goals
Young Boys U21	2023–24	Swiss Promotion League	2	0	—		—		—		2	0
Young Boys U21	2024–25	Swiss Promotion League	16	2	—		—		—		16	2
Young Boys U21	2025–26	Swiss Promotion League	11	0	—		—		—		11	0
Career total			29	0	0	0	0	0	0	0	29	0

=== International ===
As of match played 9 October 2025

Appearances and goals by national team and year
National team	Year	Apps	Goals
Haiti	2025	1	0
Total		1	0
