= Kleis Bozhanaj =

Albanian footballer

Personal information
- Date of birth: 1 March 2001 (age 25)
- Place of birth: Tirana, Albania
- Height: 1.80 m (5 ft 11 in)
- Positions: Midfielder; forward

Team information
- Current team: Modena
- Number: 17

Youth career
- 2011–2012: Ali Demi
- 2012–2014: Dinamo Tirana
- 2014–2016: Partizani
- 2016–2017: Internacional Tirana
- 2017–2021: Empoli
- 2020: → Napoli (loan)

Senior career*
Years	Team	Apps	(Gls)
2021–2023	Spezia	0	(0)
2021–2022	→ Casa Pia (loan)	2	(0)
2022	→ Carrarese (loan)	16	(2)
2023	Carrarese	2	(0)
2023–	Modena	55	(6)
2023	→ Carrarese (loan)	16	(3)
2025–2026	→ Carrarese (loan)	12	(0)
2026	→ Reggiana (loan)	12	(0)

International career^{‡}
2017	Albania U17	6	(5)
2019	Albania U19	4	(0)
- * Club domestic league appearances and goals as of 22 November 2026 ‡ National team caps and goals as of 16 November 2019

Kleis Bozhanaj (Albanian pronunciation: [ˈklɛis bɔzaˈnaj]; born 1 March 2001) is an Albanian professional footballer who plays as a midfielder or forward for Serie B club Modena.

Bozhanaj began his football development in Albania, progressing through the youth systems of Ali Demi, Dinamo Tirana, Partizani and Internacional Tirana before moving to Italy in 2017 to join Empoli's academy. During his time with Empoli, he continued his development and in 2020 spent a brief loan spell with Napoli, gaining experience within a top-level Italian club environment.

In 2021, Bozhanaj signed for Spezia, although he did not make a senior appearance for the club. He subsequently gained regular playing time through loan spells in Portugal and Italy, joining Casa Pia in the 2021–22 season and Carrarese in 2022, where he established himself as a first-team player and contributed goals from midfield. After a short permanent stint with Carrarese in 2023, he moved to Modena later the same year, becoming part of the club's Serie B squad.

While under contract with Modena, Bozhanaj returned to Carrarese on loan in 2023 and again during the 2025–26 season, continuing to accumulate senior experience. In 2026, he joined Reggiana on loan, competing in Serie B.

At international level, Bozhanaj has represented Albania in youth categories. He played for the under-17 national team in 2017, scoring five goals in six appearances, and later represented the under-19 team in 2019.

== Club career ==
=== Early career ===
Born in Tirana, Bozhanaj began playing youth football in 2011 with local side Ali Demi, before joining Dinamo Tirana in 2012, where he remained until 2014. He subsequently played for Partizani (2014–2016) and Internacional Tirana.

Bozhanaj joined the youth academy of Empoli in 2016, initially progressing through its youth teams. On 31 January 2020, he joined Napoli's under-19 team on loan for the remainder of the season, having made ten appearances and scored once for Empoli in the first half of the campaign. He returned to Empoli and was part of the team that won the Campionato Primavera 1 in the 2020–21 season.

On 31 August 2021, Bozhanaj signed a three-year contract with Serie A club Spezia and was immediately loaned to Liga Portugal 2 side Casa Pia for the season. He made his debut on 10 October, appearing as a late substitute in a 1–1 league draw against Mafra. He made two further appearances, one in the 2021–22 Taça de Portugal and another in the league, finishing the season with three appearances for the Portuguese club.

In a 2023 interview, Bozhanaj described his spell at Casa Pia as a setback, saying he had barely played for the Portuguese club.

=== Carrarese ===
On 13 July 2022, Bozhanaj moved on loan to Carrarese. On 4 September 2022, Bozhanaj made his debut for Carrarese during the opening match of the 2022–23 Serie C away against Cesena, coming on as a substitute in the 60th minute and scoring the winning goal in the 80th minute of a 2–1 victory. During the first half of the season, Bozhanaj was mainly used as a substitute, making only two starts. On 20 November 2022, Bozhanaj scored the only goal in a 1–0 win against Olbia in round 14 of the 2022–23 Serie C, having come on as a substitute.

On 5 January 2023, his loan move was made permanent. 20 days later, he signed for Serie B club Modena, with the transfer taking effect on 1 July, and remained on loan at Carrarese until the end of the season. After initially being used mainly as a substitute, Bozhanaj established himself as an important part of the midfield during the spring and scored in three consecutive league matches between late March and early April 2023, taking his season tally to five goals, while Carrarese recorded 12 consecutive matches without defeat. Bozhanaj finished the season with 33 league appearances, five goals and three assists as Carrarese finished fourth in the table and qualified for the group play-offs second round. Bozhanaj featured for 71 minutes in the play-off match against Ancona, which ended in a 1–0 defeat, resulting in Carrarese's elimination and their retention in Serie C.

=== Modena ===
Following his loan spell at Carrarese, Bozhanaj returned to Modena ahead of the 2023–24 season. However, he missed the opening matches after sustaining an injury during pre-season. On 5 September 2023, the club reported that he was undergoing an individual post-injury recovery programme, and later that month he had resumed training with the youth team while continuing his recovery. In an interview later (in December), Bozhanaj explained that a blow to his ribs during a pre-season friendly against Formigine had kept him out for almost two months, followed by a strain to his rectus femoris that sidelined him for another month. On 21 October, following his recovery, Bozhanaj made his debut for Modena, coming on as a substitute in the 73rd minute during the Serie B round 10 away match against Bari, shortly after Bari had taken the lead; he was cautioned five minutes later as Modena eventually equalised to draw 1–1. Two weeks later, Bozhanaj scored his first goal for Modena after again coming on as a substitute in the 73rd minute during an away match against Catanzaro, netting the winning goal in stoppage time (90+5') of a 2–1 victory.

During the first phase of the season, Bozhanaj was mainly introduced as a second-half substitute, while later he made fewer appearances from the bench. On 2 December, he scored the winning goal in Modena's 2–1 victory over Reggiana in the Emilian derby, coming on in the 64th minute with the score level at 1–1 and scoring seven minutes later. On 16 December 2023, Bozhanaj made his first start of the season in a 1–1 home draw against Cittadella, playing as an attacking midfielder behind the striker before being substituted in the 58th minute. In an interview two days later, he described the opportunity as unexpected, noting that his previous start had come almost five months earlier. Following the appointment of Pierpaolo Bisoli as head coach in April 2024, Bozhanaj started Modena's final two league matches of the season. On 10 May, in the final matchday of the championship, he played the full 90 minutes and scored his third goal of the season in a 3–2 away win against Lecco. His goal was selected as the best of the final matchday. In a subsequent interview, Bozhanaj credited Bisoli with giving him confidence during the closing stages of the season and described the campaign as one that had taught him to work consistently after his injury problems.

On 10 August 2024, Bozhanaj came on as a substitute in the 78th minute against Napoli in the 2024–25 Coppa Italia, scoring in the penalty shoot-out after a goalless draw, although Modena were eliminated 4–3 on penalties. Bozhanaj began the 2024–25 Serie B season a week later as a starter, scoring in the 40th minute to equalise against Südtirol in a 2–1 away defeat before being substituted in the 62nd minute. After initially making brief substitute appearances, he returned to the starting lineup in mid-September and featured regularly until late October, before returning to a mainly substitute role. On 19 October, Bozhanaj provided an assist in a 2–2 draw against Palermo, setting up Modena's first goal after the team had fallen two goals behind. Following the departure of head coach Bisoli in November, Bozhanaj was frequently left unused on the bench and made only three further starts during the remainder of the season. On 26 December, he scored a late equaliser in a 3–3 away draw against Brescia. On 2 March 2025, he came off the bench and delivered a free kick that led to a late equaliser in a 1–1 draw against Cosenza. Bozhanaj finished the season with 27 league appearances as Modena placed 11th in Serie B.

==== 2025–26 season: Loans to Carrarese and Reggiana ====
On 14 July 2025, Bozhanaj returned to Carrarese on loan, with an option to buy. During the first half of the 2025–26 Serie B season, he made 12 appearances, initially featuring regularly in the starting lineup before his playing time decreased towards the end of the year.

On 15 January 2026, his loan was terminated by mutual agreement, and he returned to Modena before joining Reggiana on loan for the remainder of the season in Serie B with an option to buy. He made his debut two days later, coming on as a substitute in the final 12 minutes of a 2–1 home defeat to Cesena in the matchday 20. He made 12 league appearances for Reggiana during the second half of the season, providing one assist.

==== Return to Modena ====
After his loan spell at Reggiana ended, Bozhanaj returned to Modena in June 2026, as Reggiana had not exercised its option to buy him. He made brief substitute appearances in the opening two matches of the 2026–27 Serie B season. On 21 November 2026, he scored his first goal in nearly two years in a 2–0 home win against Juve Stabia.

== International career ==
Bozhanaj represented Albania U17 and U19 at youth international level, featuring in friendly matches and UEFA European Championship qualification. In September 2017, Bozhanaj took part in the Kazakhstan President Cup with the U17 team, scoring twice in a 4–1 victory over Kyrgyzstan. The following month, he played in the 2018 UEFA European Under-17 Championship qualification, scoring a hat-trick in a 5–0 win against Liechtenstein.

== Career statistics ==
As of match played 22 November 2026

Appearances and goals by club, season and competition
Club	Season	League			National cup		League cup		Continental		Other		Total	
Club	Season	Division	Apps	Goals	Apps	Goals	Apps	Goals	Apps	Goals	Apps	Goals	Apps	Goals
Casa Pia	2021–22	Liga Portugal 2	2	0	1	0	—		—		—		3	0
Carrarese	2022–23	Serie C	33	4	1	0	—		—		1	0	35	4
Carrarese	2025–26	Serie B	12	0	1	0	—		—		—		13	0
Carrarese	Total		45	4	2	0	—		—		1	0	48	4
Modena	2023–24	Serie B	21	3	—		—		—		—		21	3
Modena	2024–25	Serie B	27	2	1	0	—		—		—		28	2
Modena	2026–27	Serie B	7	1	—		—		—		—		7	1
Modena	Total		55	6	1	0	—		—		—		56	6
Reggiana (loan)	2025–26	Serie B	12	0	—		—		—		—		12	0
Career total			114	10	4	0	—		—		1	0	119	10
