= John Dragani =

Swiss football manager (born 1967)

Personal information
- Date of birth: 20 December 1967 (age 58)
- Position: Forward

Senior career*
Years	Team	Apps	(Gls)
1989	FC Malley		

Managerial career
- 2008–2010: FC Lausanne-Sport
- 2010–2011: FC Stade Nyonnais
- 2012: SR Delémont
- 2012–2013: FC Fribourg
- 2014–2015: FC Le Mont (coach)
- 2015–2016: Team Vaud (youth)
- 2017–2017: FC Le Mont
- 2018–2019: FC Stade Nyonnais
- * Club domestic league appearances and goals

John Dragani (born 20 December 1967) is a Swiss football manager.
