= Kristijan Stanić =

Bosnian footballer

Personal information
- Full name: Kristijan Stanić
- Date of birth: 20 April 2001 (age 25)
- Place of birth: Mostar, Bosnia and Herzegovina
- Height: 1.86 m (6 ft 1 in)
- Position: Winger

Team information
- Current team: Zrinjski Mostar
- Number: 32

Youth career
- 2010–2018: Zrinjski Mostar

Senior career*
Years	Team	Apps	(Gls)
2018–2021	Zrinjski Mostar	14	(1)
2020	→ Solin (loan)	3	(0)
2020–2021	→ GOŠK Gabela (loan)	5	(0)
2021–2022	Krško	12	(3)
2022–2023	Croatia Zmijavci	10	(2)
2023	Zrinjski Mostar	6	(1)

International career^{‡}
2017–2019	Bosnia and Herzegovina U17	9	(1)
2019–2021	Bosnia and Herzegovina U19	7	(0)
2019–	Bosnia and Herzegovina U21	1	(0)
- * Club domestic league appearances and goals as of 30 April 2023 ‡ National team caps and goals as of 26 March 2019

Kristijan Stanić (born 20 April 2001) is a Bosnian professional footballer who plays as winger for First League of FBiH club GOŠK Gabela, on loan from Zrinjski Mostar and both the Bosnia and Herzegovina U19 and Bosnia and Herzegovina U21 national teams.

== Club career ==
Stanić was loaned to Croatian second-tier side Solin in summer 2020 and to GOŠK Gabela in October 2020.

== Career statistics ==
=== Club ===
As of match played 14 November 2020.

Club	Season	League			Cup		Continental		Total	
Club	Season	Division	Apps	Goals	Apps	Goals	Apps	Goals	Apps	Goals
Zrinjski Mostar	2017–18	Bosnian Premier League	1	0	—		—		1	0
Zrinjski Mostar	2018–19	Bosnian Premier League	8	0	0	0	2	0	10	0
Zrinjski Mostar	2019–20	Bosnian Premier League	5	1	0	0	1	0	6	1
Zrinjski Mostar	Total		14	1	0	0	3	0	17	1
Solin (loan)	2020–21	2. HNL	3	0	0	0	—		3	0
GOŠK Gabela	2020–21	First League of FBiH	5	0	0	0	—		5	0
Career total			22	1	0	0	3	0	25	1

== Honours ==
Zrinjski Mostar

- Bosnian Premier League: 2017–18
