= Noah Nurmi =

Finnish footballer (born 2001)

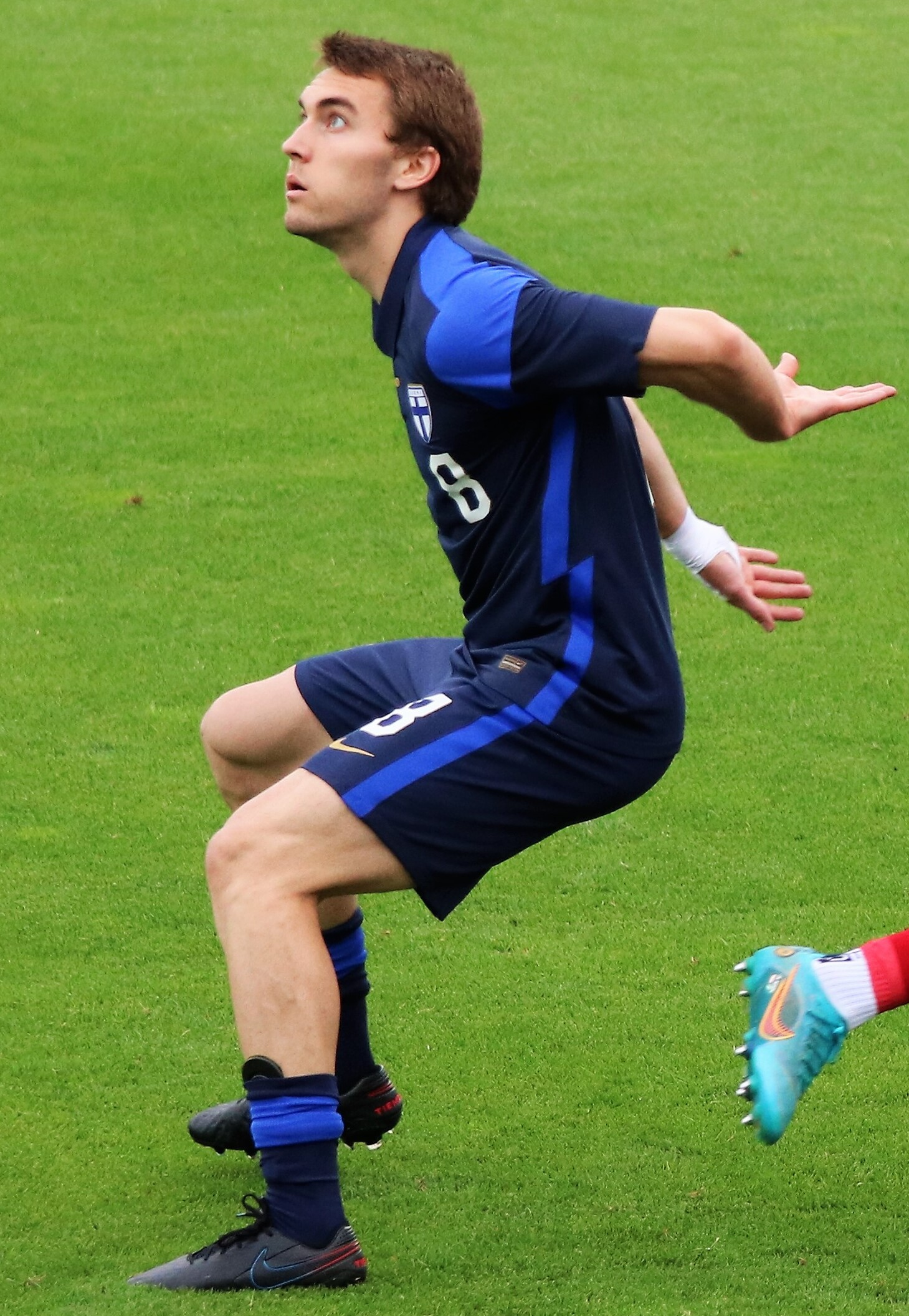
- Nurmi with Finland U21 in 2022

Personal information
- Full name: Noah Kristian Nurmi
- Date of birth: 6 February 2001 (age 25)
- Place of birth: Finland
- Height: 1.81 m (5 ft 11 in)
- Position: Centre back

Team information
- Current team: IFK Mariehamn
- Number: 2

Youth career
- –2018: KäPa
- 2018–2019: Esbjerg fB

Senior career*
Years	Team	Apps	(Gls)
2019–2020	Esbjerg fB	1	(0)
2020	→ Inter Turku (loan)	14	(0)
2021–2023	Inter Turku	59	(2)
2024–	IFK Mariehamn	37	(1)

International career^{‡}
2017	Finland U16	5	(0)
2017-2018	Finland U17	8	(0)
2019	Finland U18	3	(0)
2018–2019	Finland U19	12	(0)
2021–2022	Finland U21	5	(0)
- * Club domestic league appearances and goals as of 13 November 2026 ‡ National team caps and goals as of 5 September 2025

Noah Nurmi (born 6 February 2001) is a Finnish footballer who plays for IFK Mariehamn.

== Career ==
=== Esbjerg fB ===
In December 2017 Danish club Esbjerg fB confirmed, that they had signed Nurmi on a long-term contract, after his good performance for his club KäPa against Esbjerg in the UEFA Youth League. Nurmi made his debut for Esbjerg fB on 12 July 2019 against FC Midtjylland.

On 28 September 2019, Nurmi signed a new contract until the summer 2022. Nurmi was loaned out to FC Inter Turku on 31 January 2020 until the end of the year. On 1 February 2021, Nurmi was sold permanently to FC Inter Turku.

== Career statistics ==
As of 13 November 2026.

Appearances and goals by club, season and competition
Club	Season	League			Cup (Note: Includes Suomen Cup)		League cup (Note: Includes Finnish League Cup)		Europe		Total	
Club	Season	Division	Apps	Goals	Apps	Goals	Apps	Goals	Apps	Goals	Apps	Goals
Esbjerg fB	2018–19	Danish Superliga	0	0	0	0	–		–		0	0
Esbjerg fB	2019–20	Danish Superliga	1	0	0	0	–		–		1	0
Esbjerg fB	Total		1	0	0	0	0	0	0	0	1	0
Inter Turku (loan)	2020	Veikkausliiga	14	0	8	0	–		0	0	22	0
Inter Turku	2021	Veikkausliiga	23	0	4	0	–		2 (Note: Appearances in UEFA Conference League)	0	29	0
Inter Turku	2022	Veikkausliiga	18	0	4	0	5	0	0	0	27	0
Inter Turku	2023	Veikkausliiga	18	2	0	0	5	1	–		23	3
Inter Turku	Total		59	2	8	0	10	1	2	0	79	3
Inter Turku II	2023	Kolmonen	2	0	–		–		–		2	0
IFK Mariehamn	2024	Veikkausliiga	2	0	0	0	0	0	–		2	0
IFK Mariehamn	2025	Veikkausliiga	10	0	0	0	0	0	–		10	0
IFK Mariehamn	2026	Veikkausliiga	25	1	1	0	3	0	–		29	1
IFK Mariehamn	Total		37	1	1	0	3	0	0	0	41	1
Career total			113	3	17	0	13	1	2	0	145	4
