= Amel Mujanic =

Swedish association football player

Personal information
- Date of birth: 1 April 2001 (age 25)
- Place of birth: Malmö, Sweden
- Position: Midfielder

Team information
- Current team: AIK
- Number: 7

Youth career
- –2010: Olympic
- 2010–2019: Malmö FF

Senior career*
Years	Team	Apps	(Gls)
2019–2022	Malmö FF	0	(0)
2020–2021	→ Hobro (loan)	16	(0)
2021	→ Öster (loan)	7	(1)
2022	→ APOEL (loan)	1	(0)
2023–2025	Örgryte	76	(8)
2026–	AIK	14	(0)

International career
2017–2018	Sweden U17	14	(1)
2018–2019	Sweden U19	12	(1)
- * Club domestic league appearances and goals as of 24 August 2026

Amel Mujanic (born 1 April 2001) is a Swedish professional footballer who plays as a midfielder for Allsvenskan club AIK.

== Career ==
Mujanic started his career with Swedish top flight side Malmö FF, where he made one appearance and scored no goals. In 2020, Mujanic was sent on loan to Hobro. In 2021, he was sent on loan to Swedish second tier club Öster.

In 2022, he was sent on loan to APOEL in the Cypriot top flight. On 4 September 2022, Mujanic debuted for APOEL during a 2–0 win over Anorthosis. Before the 2023 season, he signed for Örgryte.
