= Pavlos Mavroudis =

Greek association footballer

Personal information
- Date of birth: 12 January 2001 (age 25)
- Place of birth: Munich, Germany
- Height: 1.80 m (5 ft 11 in)
- Position: Midfielder

Team information
- Current team: A.E. Kifisia
- Number: 36

Youth career
- 2006–2010: TSV 1860 Munich
- 2010–2020: Panathinaikos
- 2020–2021: Olympiacos

Senior career*
Years	Team	Apps	(Gls)
2021–2024	Olympiacos B	39	(0)
2024–2025	AEK Athens B	14	(0)
2025–2026	Marko	0	(0)
2026–	A.E. Kifisia	0	(0)

International career^{‡}
2017–2018	Greece U17	13	(1)
- * Club domestic league appearances and goals as of 10 July 2026 ‡ National team caps and goals as of 27 March 2018

Pavlos Mavroudis (Greek: Παύλος Μαυρουδής; born 12 January 2001) is a Greek professional footballer who plays as a midfielder for Super League club A.E. Kifisia.
