= Lukas Schöfl =

Austrian footballer

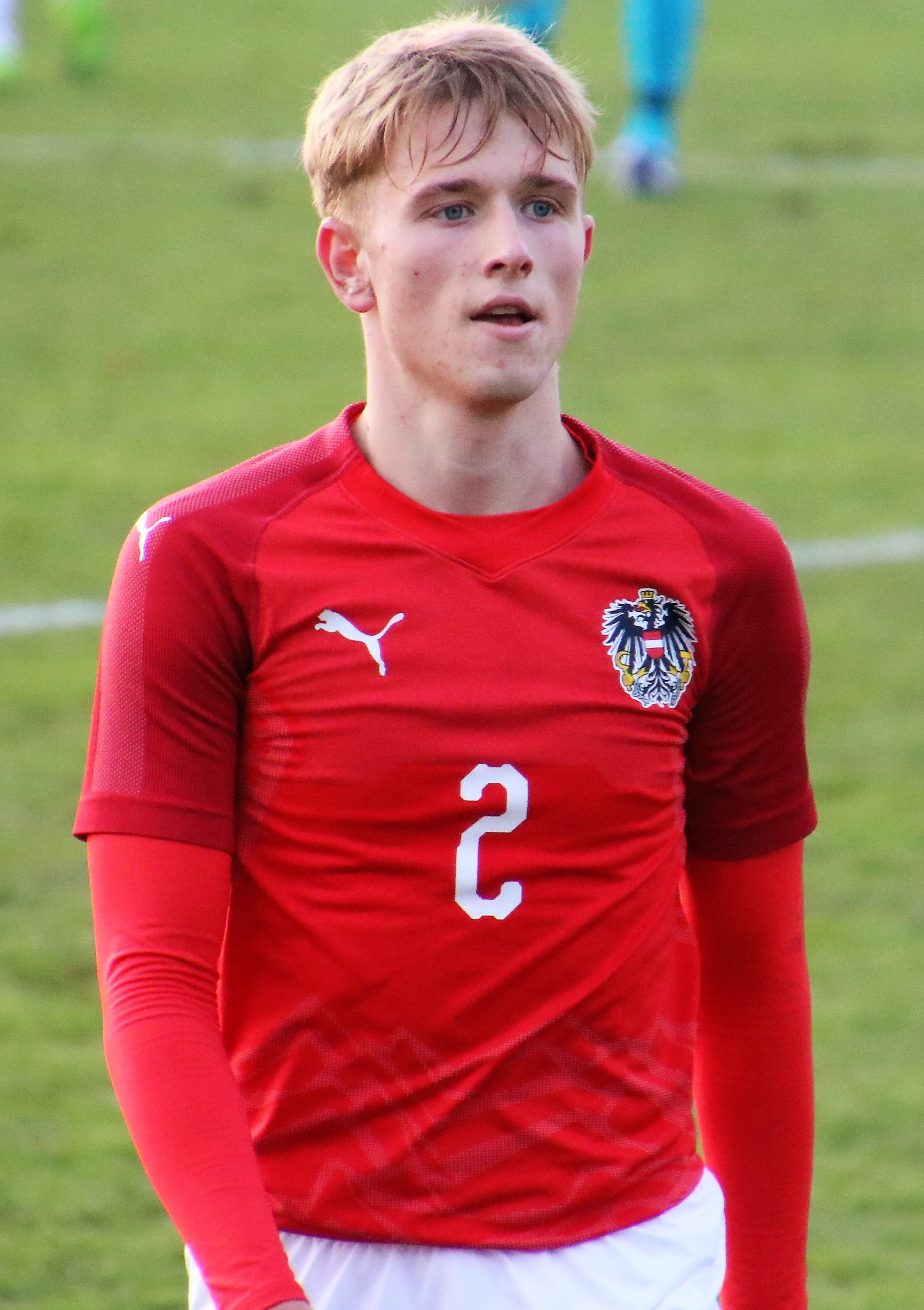

Personal information
- Date of birth: 11 February 2001 (age 25)
- Place of birth: Vienna, Austria
- Height: 1.77 m (5 ft 10 in)
- Position: Midfielder

Team information
- Current team: SR Donaufeld
- Number: 16

Youth career
- 2007–2016: SC Columbia Floridsdorf
- 2016–2017: Wolfsberger AC

Senior career*
Years	Team	Apps	(Gls)
2017–2023	Wolfsberger AC II	65	(25)
2019–2023	Wolfsberger AC	15	(0)
2022–2023	→ Floridsdorfer AC (loan)	10	(1)
2023–	SR Donaufeld	29	(4)

International career^{‡}
2017–2018	Austria U17	12	(1)
2018–2019	Austria U18	5	(1)
2019–2020	Austria U19	5	(0)
- * Club domestic league appearances and goals as of 11 November 2023 ‡ National team caps and goals as of 16:21, 25 November 2021 (UTC)

Lukas Schöfl (born 11 February 2001) is an Austrian professional footballer who plays for SR Donaufeld in the Austrian Regionalliga.

== Club career ==
On 30 June 2022, Schöfl joined Floridsdorfer AC on loan.
