= Florian Hysenaj =

Kosovan footballer (born 2001)

Personal information
- Date of birth: 20 July 2001 (age 25)
- Place of birth: Nyon, Switzerland
- Height: 1.80 m (5 ft 11 in)
- Position: Centre-forward

Team information
- Current team: Stade Nyonnais
- Number: 11

Youth career
- 2017–2019: Lausanne-Sport

Senior career*
Years	Team	Apps	(Gls)
2019–2022	Lausanne-Sport U21	37	(10)
2020–2023	Lausanne-Sport	1	(0)
2021–2022	→ Stade Lausanne Ouchy (loan)	8	(0)
2023	→ Bavois (loan)	15	(5)
2023–2026	Étoile Carouge	75	(10)
2026–	Stade Nyonnais	15	(0)

International career^{‡}
2017	Kosovo U17	3	(1)
- * Club domestic league appearances and goals as of 30 September 2026 ‡ National team caps and goals as of 16 October 2017

Florian Hysenaj (born 20 July 2001) is a Kosovar professional footballer who plays as a centre-forward for Swiss Challenge League club Stade Nyonnais.

== Club career ==
=== Lausanne-Sport ===
On 20 March 2019, Hysenaj made his debut with U21 team of Lausanne-Sport in a 2–0 home win against Bulle after coming on as a substitute at 82nd minute in place of Stéphane Cueni. Nineteen month later, he made his professional debut with the senior team in their 0–1 home defeat against Lugano after coming on as a substitute at 75th minute in place of Lucas Da Cunha.

In summer 2023, Hysenaj moved to Étoile Carouge.

== International career ==
On 7 October 2017, Hysenaj was named as part of the Kosovo U17 squad for 2018 UEFA European Under-17 Championship qualifications. Three days later, he made his debut with Kosovo U17 in match against Netherlands U17 after being named in the starting line-up.

== Career statistics ==
=== Club ===
As of 7 November 2020

Club	Season	League			Cup		Other		Total	
Club	Season	Division	Apps	Goals	Apps	Goals	Apps	Goals	Apps	Goals
Lausanne-Sport U21	2018–19	Swiss 1. Liga	2	0	0	0	—		2	0
Lausanne-Sport U21	2019–20	Swiss 1. Liga	14	1	0	0	—		14	1
Lausanne-Sport U21	2020–21	Swiss 1. Liga	8	2	0	0	—		8	2
Lausanne-Sport U21	Total		24	3	0	0	—		24	3
Lausanne-Sport	2020–21	Swiss Super League	1	0	0	0	—		1	0
Lausanne-Sport	Total		1	0	0	0	—		1	0
Career total			25	3	0	0	—		25	3
