= Lucas Lissens =

Belgian footballer (born 2001)

Personal information
- Date of birth: 2 May 2001 (age 25)
- Place of birth: Belgium
- Height: 1.84 m (6 ft 0 in)
- Position: Centre-back

Team information
- Current team: Randers
- Number: 2

Youth career
- –2020: Anderlecht

Senior career*
Years	Team	Apps	(Gls)
2020–2024	Anderlecht	3	(0)
2022–2024	RSCA Futures	36	(4)
2024–2025	Lyngby Boldklub	41	(1)
2025–	Randers	15	(0)

International career
2016	Belgium U15	4	(2)
2016–2017	Belgium U16	4	(1)
2018	Belgium U17	8	(2)
2018–2019	Belgium U18	5	(0)
2019–2020	Belgium U19	10	(0)
2021–2022	Belgium U21	2	(0)
- * Club domestic league appearances and goals as of 19 May 2026

Lucas Lissens (born 25 July 2001) is a Belgian footballer who currently plays as a centre-back for Danish Superliga club Randers FC.

== Career ==
On 31 January 2024, Lissens signed for Danish Superliga club Lyngby Boldklub on a three-and-a-half-year deal. After a 2024–25 season that ended in relegation for Lyngby, it was confirmed on 20 June 2025 that Lissens had been sold to Danish Superliga club Randers FC, signing a contract until June 2028.

== Career statistics ==
As of match played 29 September 2024

Appearances and goals by club, season and competition
Club	Season	League			National cup (Note: Includes Belgian Cup, Danish Cup)		Continental		Total	
Club	Season	Division	Apps	Goals	Apps	Goals	Apps	Goals	Apps	Goals
Anderlecht	2019-20	Belgian Pro League	0	0	0	0	—		0	0
Anderlecht	2020-21	Belgian Pro League	2	0	2	0	—		4	0
Anderlecht	2021-22	Belgian Pro League	0	0	0	0	0	0	0	0
Anderlecht	2022-23	Belgian Pro League	1	0	1	0	0	0	2	0
Anderlecht	2023-24	Belgian Pro League	0	0	1	0	—		1	0
Anderlecht	Total		3	0	4	0	0	0	7	0
RSCA Futures	2022-23	Challenger Pro League	27	2	—		—		27	2
RSCA Futures	2023-24	Challenger Pro League	9	2	—		—		9	2
RSCA Futures	Total		36	4	—		—		36	4
Lyngby	2023-24	Danish Superliga	13	0	0	0	—		13	0
Lyngby	2024-25	Danish Superliga	7	0	1	0	—		8	0
Lyngby	Total		20	0	1	0	0	0	21	0
Career total			59	4	5	0	0	0	64	4
