= Martin Novaković =

Serbian footballer

Personal information
- Full name: Martin Novaković
- Date of birth: 5 January 2001 (age 25)
- Place of birth: Zaječar, FR Yugoslavia
- Height: 1.75 m (5 ft 9 in)
- Position: Midfielder

Team information
- Current team: Radnik Surdulica
- Number: 30

Youth career
- Partizan
- 2019–2020: Red Star Belgrade

Senior career*
Years	Team	Apps	(Gls)
2020–2021	Red Star Belgrade	0	(0)
2020–2021	→ Rad (loan)	26	(4)
2021	→ IMT (loan)	14	(3)
2022	Voždovac	21	(1)
2023–2025	Mačva Šabac	83	(12)
2025–	Radnik Surdulica	25	(7)

International career^{‡}
2017–2018	Serbia U17	5	(3)
2019	Serbia U19	3	(0)
- * Club domestic league appearances and goals as of 12 June 2026 ‡ National team caps and goals as of 8 October 2020

Martin Novaković (Serbian Cyrillic: Мартин Новаковић; born 5 January 2001) is a Serbian professional footballer who plays as a midfielder for Radnik Surdulica.
