= Leonid Gerchikov =

Russian footballer

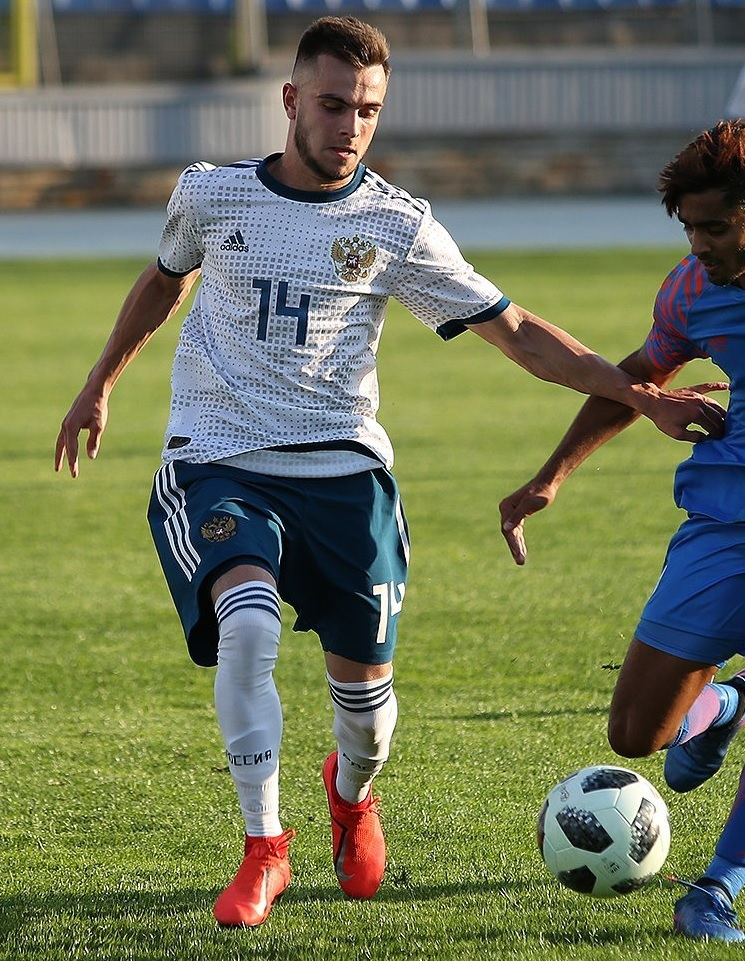
- Gerchikov in action with Russia U18 against India U18 in 2019

Personal information
- Full name: Leonid Borisovich Gerchikov
- Date of birth: 17 August 2001 (age 25)
- Place of birth: Moscow, Russia
- Height: 1.70 m (5 ft 7 in)
- Position: Midfielder

Team information
- Current team: SKA Rostov-on-Don

Senior career*
Years	Team	Apps	(Gls)
2017–2021	Chertanovo Moscow	68	(2)
2018–2019	→ Chertanovo-2 Moscow	12	(0)
2021	Olimp-Dolgoprudny	19	(1)
2022–2025	Krylia Sovetov Samara	0	(0)
2022	→ Metallurg Lipetsk (loan)	5	(1)
2022–2023	→ Zvezda St. Petersburg (loan)	13	(1)
2023	→ Veles Moscow (loan)	7	(1)
2023–2024	→ Chelyabinsk (loan)	26	(0)
2024–2025	→ Murom (loan)	29	(1)
2025–	SKA Rostov-on-Don	0	(0)

International career^{‡}
2016	Russia U15	5	(0)
2016–2017	Russia U16	12	(0)
2017–2018	Russia U17	18	(4)
2019	Russia U18	9	(0)
2019	Russia U19	3	(1)
- * Club domestic league appearances and goals as of 15 June 2025 ‡ National team caps and goals as of 16 November 2019

Leonid Borisovich Gerchikov (Russian: Леонид Борисович Герчиков; born 17 August 2001) is a Russian football player who plays for SKA Rostov-on-Don.

== Club career ==
He made his debut in the Russian Professional Football League for Chertanovo Moscow on 20 May 2018 in a game against Murom. He made his Russian Football National League debut for Chertanovo on 13 October 2018 in a game against Shinnik Yaroslavl.

On 5 February 2022, Gerchikov moved to Krylia Sovetov Samara. On 17 February 2022, Gerchikov was loaned by Metallurg Lipetsk.

On 17 August 2025, he joined SKA Rostov-on-Don in Media Football League.
