= Roman Yakuba =

Ukrainian footballer

Personal information
- Full name: Roman Yuriyovych Yakuba
- Date of birth: 23 April 2001 (age 25)
- Place of birth: Lviv, Ukraine
- Height: 1.91 m (6 ft 3 in)
- Position: Centre-back

Team information
- Current team: Zagłębie Lubin
- Number: 3

Youth career
- 2012–2013: Poshuk Sykhivska Himnaziya Lviv
- 2013–2014: Opir Lviv
- 2014–2016: Lviv
- 2016–2018: Shakhtar Donetsk

Senior career*
| Years | Team | Apps | (Gls) |
| 2018–2021 | Shakhtar Donetsk | 0 | (0) |
| 2021–2024 | Valmiera | 38 | (1) |
| 2023–2024 | → Puszcza Niepołomice (loan) | 51 | (4) |
| 2024–2025 | Puszcza Niepołomice | 33 | (3) |
| 2025– | Zagłębie Lubin | 22 | (0) |

International career
| 2017 | Ukraine U16 | 6 | (1) |
| 2017–2018 | Ukraine U17 | 8 | (1) |
| 2018–2019 | Ukraine U18 | 3 | (1) |
| 2019 | Ukraine U19 | 3 | (0) |
| 2022 | Ukraine U21 | 1 | (0) |
- * Club domestic league appearances and goals as of 17:33, 29 May 2026 (UTC)

Roman Yuriyovych Yakuba (Ukrainian: Роман Юрійович Якуба; born 23 April 2001) is a Ukrainian professional footballer who plays as a centre-back for Polish club Zagłębie Lubin.

== Honours ==
Valmiera

- Latvian Higher League: 2022
