= Elias Mastokangas =

Finnish footballer (born 2001)

Personal information
- Full name: Elias Alvar Aleksanteri Mastokangas
- Date of birth: 1 February 2001 (age 25)
- Place of birth: Finland
- Height: 1.70 m (5 ft 7 in)
- Position: Midfielder

Team information
- Current team: SJK
- Number: 19

Youth career
- KaaPo
- Inter Turku

Senior career*
Years	Team	Apps	(Gls)
2016	KaaPo	2	(0)
2017–2023	Inter Turku	38	(3)
2018–2023	→ Inter Turku II	22	(8)
2018	→ KaaPo (loan)	15	(2)
2021	→ IFK Mariehamn (loan)	20	(3)
2022	→ Haka (loan)	12	(2)
2023–2024	Haka	40	(7)
2025–	SJK	47	(6)

International career^{‡}
2016–2017	Finland U16	5	(1)
2017–2018	Finland U17	13	(5)
2018	Finland U18	2	(2)
2019	Finland U19	7	(0)
2021	Finland U20	2	(0)
2021	Finland U21	2	(0)
- * Club domestic league appearances and goals as of 13 November 2026 ‡ National team caps and goals as of 14 November 2021

Elias Alvar Aleksanteri Mastokangas (born 1 February 2001) is a Finnish football player who plays as midfielder for Veikkausliiga club SJK Seinäjoki.

== Career ==
=== Inter Turku and loans ===
Mastokangas joined Inter Turku in 2017.

Mastokangas was loaned out on 2 May 2018 to KaaPo for the rest of 2018, the club he also played for as a youth player.

In the 2021 season, Mastokangas played for IFK Mariehamn on loan.

=== FC Haka ===
On 28 July 2022, Mastokangas was loaned out to fellow Veikkausliiga club Haka for the rest of the 2022 season. He returned to Inter Turku for the start of the 2023 season.

In the summer 2023, Mastokangas left Inter Turku and transferred to Haka on a permanent contract for the rest of the season, with an option to extend. On 10 October 2023, Haka announced that they had exercised their option to keep Mastokangas in Valkeakoski until the end of 2024.

=== SJK ===
On 13 November 2024, Mastokangas signed with SJK Seinäjoki on a two-year deal with a one-year option.

== Career statistics ==
As of 1 June 2025

Appearances and goals by club, season and competition
Club	Season	League			National cup (Note: Includes Suomen Cup)		League cup (Note: Appearances in Finnish League Cup)		Europe		Total	
Club	Season	Division	Apps	Goals	Apps	Goals	Apps	Goals	Apps	Goals	Apps	Goals
KaaPo	2016	Kolmonen	2	0	0	0	—		—		2	0
Inter Turku	2017	Veikkausliiga	3	0	0	0	—		—		3	0
Inter Turku	2018	Veikkausliiga	0	0	2	0	—		—		2	0
Inter Turku	2019	Veikkausliiga	10	1	0	0	—		1 (Note: Appearance in UEFA Europa League)	0	11	1
Inter Turku	2020	Veikkausliiga	19	2	7	3	—		—		26	5
Inter Turku	2021	Veikkausliiga	0	0	0	0	—		0	0	0	0
Inter Turku	2022	Veikkausliiga	5	0	1	0	4	0	2 (Note: Appearances in UEFA Europa Conference League)	0	10	0
Inter Turku	2023	Veikkausliiga	1	0	2	2	2	0	—		5	2
Inter Turku	Total		38	3	12	5	6	0	3	0	59	8
Inter Turku II	2018	Kolmonen	4	0	—		—		—		4	0
Inter Turku II	2019	Kolmonen	9	1	—		—		—		9	1
Inter Turku II	2022	Kolmonen	4	3	—		—		—		4	3
Inter Turku II	2023	Kolmonen	5	4	—		—		—		5	4
Inter Turku II	Total		22	8	0	0	0	0	0	0	22	8
KaaPo (loan)	2018	Kakkonen	15	2	—		—		—		15	2
IFK Mariehamn (loan)	2021	Veikkausliiga	20	3	2	1	—		—		22	4
Haka (loan)	2022	Veikkausliiga	12	2	—		—		—		12	2
Haka	2023	Veikkausliiga	12	7	—		—		—		12	7
Haka	2024	Veikkausliiga	28	0	5	0	5	3	—		38	3
Haka	Total		40	7	5	0	5	3	0	0	50	10
SJK	2025	Veikkausliiga	9	1	1	1	5	0	0	0	15	2
Career total			148	26	20	7	16	3	3	0	187	36
