= Maksim Kutovoy =

Association football player (2001-)

Personal information
- Full name: Maksim Aleksandrovich Kutovoy
- Date of birth: 1 July 2001 (age 25)
- Place of birth: Slavyansk-na-Kubani, Russia
- Height: 1.87 m (6 ft 2 in)
- Position: Forward

Team information
- Current team: FC Salyut Belgorod
- Number: 90

Youth career
- Olimp Slavyansk-na-Kubani
- 2016–2019: FC Krasnodar

Senior career*
Years	Team	Apps	(Gls)
2018–2023	FC Krasnodar-2	105	(9)
2020–2023	FC Krasnodar	11	(1)
2023–2025	FC SKA-Khabarovsk	27	(1)
2023–2025	FC SKA-Khabarovsk-2	11	(7)
2026	FC Sokol Saratov	12	(0)
2026–	FC Salyut Belgorod	13	(3)

International career^{‡}
2016	Russia U-15	5	(2)
2016–2017	Russia U-16	6	(5)
2017–2018	Russia U-17	9	(7)
2019–2020	Russia U-19	7	(2)
- * Club domestic league appearances and goals as of 31 October 2026 ‡ National team caps and goals as of 11 February 2020

Maksim Aleksandrovich Kutovoy (Russian: Максим Александрович Кутовой; born 1 July 2001) is a Russian football player who plays as a centre-forward for FC Salyut Belgorod.

== Club career ==
He made his debut in the Russian Professional Football League for FC Krasnodar-2 on 16 May 2018 in a game against FC Afips Afipsky. He made his Russian Football National League debut for Krasnodar-2 on 17 July 2018 in a game against FC Sibir Novosibirsk.

He made his Russian Premier League debut for FC Krasnodar on 12 July 2020 in a game against FC Ural Yekaterinburg, replacing Wanderson in the 85th minute.

On 1 August 2023, Kutovoy signed a three-year contract with the Russian First League club FC SKA-Khabarovsk.

== Career statistics ==
As of 27 November 2022

Club	Season	League			Cup		Continental		Other		Total	
Club	Season	Division	Apps	Goals	Apps	Goals	Apps	Goals	Apps	Goals	Apps	Goals
Krasnodar-2	2017–18	Second League	1	0	–		–		1 (Note: Appearance in the FNL Cup)	1	2	1
Krasnodar-2	2018–19	First League	15	1	–		–		–		15	1
Krasnodar-2	2019–20	First League	17	0	–		–		–		17	0
Krasnodar-2	2020–21	First League	31	5	–		–		–		31	5
Krasnodar-2	2021–22	First League	16	3	–		–		–		16	3
Krasnodar-2	2022–23	First League	11	0	–		–		–		11	0
Krasnodar-2	Total		91	9	0	0	0	0	1	1	92	10
Krasnodar	2019–20	RPL	3	0	0	0	0	0	–		3	0
Krasnodar	2020–21	RPL	7	0	0	0	0	0	–		7	0
Krasnodar	2022–23	RPL	1	1	0	0	–		–		1	1
Krasnodar	Total		11	1	0	0	0	0	0	0	11	1
Career total			102	10	0	0	0	0	1	1	103	11
