= Edin Mujić =

Bosnian footballer

Personal information
- Date of birth: 27 January 2001 (age 25)
- Place of birth: Sarajevo, Bosnia and Herzegovina
- Height: 1.87 m (6 ft 2 in)
- Position: Midfielder

Team information
- Current team: Radnik Hadžići
- Number: 17

Youth career
- –2020: Željezničar

Senior career*
Years	Team	Apps	(Gls)
2020–2023	Željezničar	1	(0)
2020	→ Jedinstvo Bihać (loan)	8	(0)
2021	→ Goražde (loan)	11	(3)
2022–2023	→ Goražde (loan)	19	(2)
2023–	Radnik Hadžići	10	(0)

International career^{‡}
2017	Bosnia and Herzegovina U16	4	(0)
2017–2018	Bosnia and Herzegovina U17	11	(1)
2018–2019	Bosnia and Herzegovina U18	6	(0)
2019	Bosnia and Herzegovina U19	2	(0)
- * Club domestic league appearances and goals as of 18 November 2023 ‡ National team caps and goals as of 6 June 2019

Edin Mujić (born 27 January 2001) is a Bosnian professional footballer who plays as a midfielder for First League of FBiH club Radnik Hadžići.

== Club career ==
=== Željezničar ===
In February 2020, after he passed all the youth categories, Mujić signed a three-year deal with Bosnian club Željezničar. In February 2023, Nargalić left the club. Mujić was sent out on loan to Jedinstvo Bihać and Goražde.

== Career statistics ==
=== Club ===
As of match played 29 November 2023

Appearances and goals by club, season and competition
Club	Season	League			National cup (Note: Appearance(s) in Bosnia and Herzegovina Football Cup)		Europe		Total	
Club	Season	League	Apps	Goals	Apps	Goals	Apps	Goals	Apps	Goals
Jedinstvo Bihać (loan)	2020–21	First League of FBiH	8	0	0	0	–		8	0
Goražde (loan)	2020–21	First League of FBiH	11	3	0	0	–		11	3
Željezničar	2021–22	Bosnian Premier League	1	0	0	0	—		1	0
Goražde (loan)	2022–23	First League of FBiH	19	2	0	0	–		19	2
Radnik Hadžići	2023–24	First League of FBiH	10	0	1	0	—		11	0
Career total			49	5	1	0	0	0	50	5
