= Amir Abdijanovic =

Austrian footballer (born 2001)

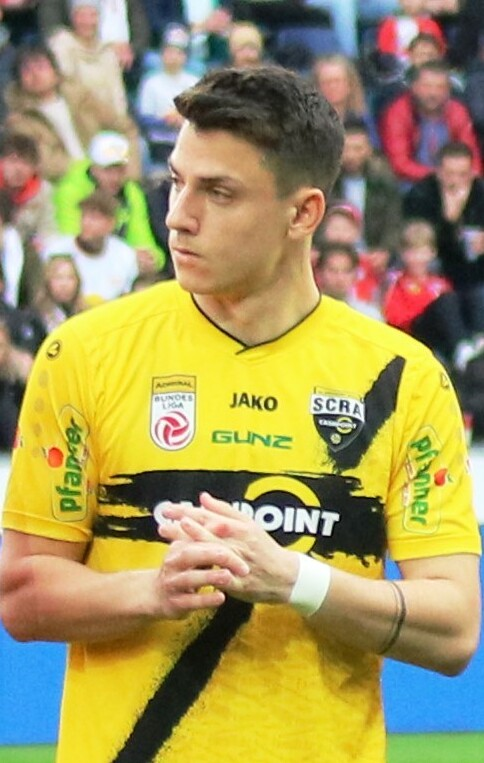
- Abdijanovic in 2023

Personal information
- Date of birth: 3 March 2001 (age 25)
- Place of birth: Dornbirn, Austria
- Height: 1.80 m (5 ft 11 in)
- Position: Forward

Team information
- Current team: First Vienna
- Number: 9

Youth career
- 2006–2014: Dornburn
- 2014–2016: AKA Vorarlberg

Senior career*
Years	Team	Apps	(Gls)
2016–2017	Dornburn	2	(0)
2017–2021	Wolfsburg II	2	(0)
2021–2024	Rheindorf Altach	35	(1)
2021–2022	Rheindorf Altach II	11	(12)
2022	→ Dornbirn (loan)	29	(2)
2024–2025	SV Horn	41	(13)
2025–	First Vienna	11	(0)

International career^{‡}
2015–2016	Austria U15	7	(0)
2016–2017	Austria U16	8	(7)
2017–2018	Austria U17	7	(2)
2019–2020	Austria U19	9	(3)
- * Club domestic league appearances and goals as of 17 May 2026 ‡ National team caps and goals as of 20:57, 26 May 2023 (UTC)

Amir Abdijanovic (Bosnian: Abdijanović; born 3 March 2001) is an Austrian professional footballer who plays as a forward for First Vienna.

== Career ==
Abdijanovic is a youth product of his local club Dornburn and AKA Vorarlberg. He began his senior career with Dornbirn in 2016, and shortly after moved to the Wolfsburg reserves in Germany. Mostly playing for their U19 squad, he returned to Austria with Rheindorf Altach on 23 June 2021 signing a 2-year contract. He made his professional debut with Rheindorf Altach in a 2–0 Austrian Football Bundesliga loss to Admira Wacker on 2 October 2021. He returned to Dornbirn on loan on 31 January 2022 for the second half of the 2021–22 season before returning to Rheindorf Altach the next season. On 4 April 2023, he extended his contract with Rheindorf Altach for an additional season. He left Rheindorf Altach by mutual consent on 6 February 2024.

On 7 February 2024, Abdijanovic signed a contract with SV Horn until the end of the 2023–24 season.

== International career ==
Born in Austria, Abdijanovic is of Bosnian descent. He is a youth international for Austria, having played up to the Austria U19s.
