= Marcel Monsberger =

Austrian footballer

Personal information
- Full name: Marcel Michael Monsberger
- Date of birth: 12 March 2001 (age 25)
- Place of birth: Wolfsberg, Austria
- Height: 1.72 m (5 ft 8 in)
- Position: Forward

Team information
- Current team: Vaduz
- Number: 9

Youth career
- Wolfsberger AC

Senior career*
Years	Team	Apps	(Gls)
2017–2018	Wolfsberger AC	1	(0)
2017–2018	Wolfsberger AC II	21	(7)
2018–2023	FC Juniors OÖ	50	(3)
2021	→ Vorwärts Steyr (loan)	16	(2)
2021–2023	→ Floridsdorfer AC (loan)	58	(13)
2023–2024	SKU Amstetten	29	(5)
2024–2025	Schwarz-Weiß Bregenz	29	(8)
2025–	Vaduz	44	(14)

International career^{‡}
2017	Austria U16	2	(0)
2017–2018	Austria U17	13	(11)
2018–2019	Austria U18	10	(0)
2019–2020	Austria U19	8	(7)
- * Club domestic league appearances and goals as of 28 September 2026 ‡ National team caps and goals as of 4 September 2020

Marcel Monsberger (born 12 March 2001) is an Austrian professional footballer who plays as a forward for Liechtensteiner Swiss Super League club Vaduz.

== Club career ==
A youth product of Wolfsberger AC, Monsberger made his debut with the first team on 10 March 2018. In the summer of 2018, he joined the newly rebranded FC Juniors OÖ in the second division. He was loaned to Vorwärts Steyr for the second half of the 2020–21 season before joining Floridsdorfer AC on loan on 1 July 2021.

In the summer of 2023, Monsberger joined Amstetten.

On 8 June 2024, Monsberger joined divisional rival Schwarz–Weiẞ Bregenz, on a two-year contract.

On 26 May 2025, he joined Vaduz on a two-year contract.

== Career statistics ==
As of 19 November 2025

Appearances and goals by club, season and competition
Club	Season	League			National cup		Continental (Note: Appearances in UEFA Conference League)		Total	
Club	Season	Division	Apps	Goals	Apps	Goals	Apps	Goals	Apps	Goals
Wolfsberger II	2017–18	Austrian Regionalliga Central	21	7	—		—		21	7
Wolfsberger AC	2017–18	Austrian Bundesliga	1	0	0	0	—		1	0
FC Juniors OÖ	2018–19	Austrian 2.Liga	22	2	0	0	—		22	2
FC Juniors OÖ	2019–20	Austrian 2.Liga	18	0	1	0	—		19	0
FC Juniors OÖ	2020–21	Austrian 2.Liga	10	1	0	0	—		10	1
FC Juniors OÖ	Total		50	3	1	0	—		51	3
Vorwärts Steyr (loan)	2020–21	Austrian 2.Liga	16	2	0	0	—		16	2
Floridsdorfer AC (loan)	2021–22	Austrian 2.Liga	29	7	3	0	—		32	7
Floridsdorfer AC (loan)	2022–23	Austrian 2.Liga	29	6	2	1	—		31	7
Floridsdorfer AC (loan)	Total		58	12	5	1	—		63	14
Amstetten	2023–24	Austrian 2.Liga	29	5	2	1	—		31	6
Bregenz	2024–25	Austrian 2.Liga	29	8	4	1	—		33	9
Vaduz	2025–26	Swiss Challenge League	13	2	1	2	4	0	18	4
Career total			217	39	13	5	4	0	324	44
