= Agapios Vrikkis =

Cypriot footballer (born 2001)

Personal information
- Date of birth: 3 May 2001 (age 25)
- Place of birth: Nicosia, Cyprus
- Height: 1.84 m (6 ft 0 in)
- Position: Midfielder

Team information
- Current team: Olympiakos Nicosia

Youth career
- –2017: APOEL
- 2017–2019: Torino
- 2019: Padova
- 2019–2020: Napoli

Senior career*
Years	Team	Apps	(Gls)
2020–2021	Catania	2	(0)
2021	Manzanese		
2021	Luparense	4	(0)
2021–2022	Mestre	19	(1)
2022–2023	AEZ Zakakiou	18	(1)
2023–2024	Omonia 29M	27	(3)
2024–2025	Karmiotissa	16	(0)
2025–2026	Apollon Limassol	25	(1)
2026-	Olympiakos Nicosia		

International career^{‡}
2017–2018	Cyprus U17	8	(1)
2019	Cyprus U19	6	(0)
- * Club domestic league appearances and goals as of 12:52, 2 June 2026 (UTC) ‡ National team caps and goals as of 19 November 2019

Agapios Vrikkis (Greek: Αγάπιος Βρίκκης; born 3 May 2001) is a Cypriot professional footballer who plays as a midfielder.

== Career ==
Vrikkis made his debut for Catania on 7 March 2021, in a 3–0 win against Casertana.

On 3 August 2021, he joined Manzanese in the fifth-tier Eccellenza. A month later, he moved to Luparense in Serie D. On 4 November 2021, he transferred for the third time in 3 months, joining Serie D club Mestre.
