= Davide Ghislandi =

Italian footballer (born 2001)

Personal information
- Full name: Davide Angelo Ghislandi
- Date of birth: 16 June 2001 (age 25)
- Place of birth: Treviglio, Italy
- Height: 1.78 m (5 ft 10 in)
- Position: Wing-back

Team information
- Current team: Atalanta Under-23
- Number: 24

Youth career
- Atalanta

Senior career*
Years	Team	Apps	(Gls)
2021–	Atalanta	1	(0)
2021–2022	→ Turris (loan)	25	(0)
2022–2023	→ Triestina (loan)	23	(0)
2023–	→ Atalanta U23 (res.)	79	(8)

International career
2016	Italy U15	9	(1)
2016–2017	Italy U16	15	(2)
2017–2018	Italy U17	9	(3)
2018–2019	Italy U18	8	(0)
2019–2020	Italy U19	7	(0)
- * Club domestic league appearances and goals as of 1 May 2026

Davide Angelo Ghislandi (born 16 June 2001) is an Italian professional footballer who plays as a wing-back for Serie C Group C club Atalanta Under-23.

== Club career ==
Ghislandi made his professional debut with Atalanta as a substitute a 5–1 Serie A win over Crotone on 3 March 2021.

On 11 July 2022, Ghislandi was loaned to Triestina.
