= Uros Vasic =

Swiss footballer (born 2001)

Personal information
- Date of birth: 25 October 2001 (age 25)
- Place of birth: Brig-Glis, Switzerland
- Height: 1.72 m (5 ft 8 in)
- Positions: Left winger; midfielder

Team information
- Current team: Biel-Bienne
- Number: 17

Youth career
- Naters
- –2018: Thun

Senior career*
Years	Team	Apps	(Gls)
2018–2021	Thun U21	22	(6)
2019–2025	Thun	49	(0)
2022	→ Naters (loan)	11	(5)
2025	→ Naters (loan)	11	(5)
2025–	Biel-Bienne	34	(6)
- * Club domestic league appearances and goals as of 30 September 2026

Uros Vasic (born 25 October 2001) is a Swiss professional footballer who plays as a left winger for Biel-Bienne.

== Club career ==
Vasic was born in Brig-Glis and started playing football at Naters before joining Thun. He moved through the youth teams of Thun before debuting for their U21 squad in the 1. Liga, the fourth tier of the Swiss football league system, on 1 September 2018. On 25 May 2019, he was named in the first-team matchday squad for the first time, but did not receive playing time. Prior to the 2019–20 season, he signed a professional contract with Thun and was promoted to a permanent member of the first-team squad at the age of 18. He debuted in the Swiss Super League on 28 July 2019 in a 0–0 draw against Lugano. At the end of the 2019–20 season, Thun was relegated to the Swiss Challenge League after losing in the relegation play-offs against FC Vaduz.

On 4 January 2022, Vasic was loaned to Naters until the end of the 2021–22 season.

On 1 July 2025, Vasic signed with Biel-Bienne.

== International career ==
Born in Switzerland, Vasic is of Serbian descent. Between 2017 and 2019, Vasic has represented Switzerland at the under-17, under-18, and under-19 level. He was part of the Swiss squad at the 2018 UEFA European Under-17 Championship and appeared in two group stage matches as a substitute. Switzerland placed third in their group and did not move on to the knockout phase of the tournament.
