= Mikołaj Nawrocki =

Polish footballer

Personal information
- Date of birth: 2 October 2001 (age 25)
- Place of birth: Zamość, Poland
- Height: 1.80 m (5 ft 11 in)
- Position: Midfielder

Youth career
- Roztocze Szczebrzeszyn
- 2013–2014: OSiR Biłgoraj
- 2014–2016: BKS Lublin
- 2016–2017: Jagiellonia Białystok

Senior career*
Years	Team	Apps	(Gls)
2017–2020	Jagiellonia Białystok	1	(0)
2019–2022	Jagiellonia Białystok II	28	(2)
2022–2025	Świdniczanka Świdnik	71	(5)

International career
2016–2017	Poland U16	6	(1)
2017–2018	Poland U17	5	(0)
2018	Poland U18	1	(1)
- * Club domestic league appearances and goals as of 17:30, 5 June 2026 (UTC)

Mikołaj Nawrocki (born 2 October 2001) is a Polish professional footballer who plays as a midfielder.

== Honours ==
Jagiellonia Białystok II

- IV liga Podlasie: 2019–20

Świdniczanka Świdnik

- IV liga Lublin: 2022–23
- Polish Cup (Lublin subdistrict regionals): 2022–23
