= Helmer Andersson =

Swedish footballer

Personal information
- Date of birth: 8 September 2001 (age 25)
- Height: 1.90 m (6 ft 3 in)
- Position: Defender

Team information
- Current team: Karlslunds IF

Youth career
- Östra Almby FK
- Örebro SK

Senior career*
Years	Team	Apps	(Gls)
2019–2021	Örebro SK	5	(0)
2020–2021	→ Karlslunds IF (loan)	22	(1)
2022–	Karlslunds IF	0	(0)

International career^{‡}
2018	Sweden U17	10	(0)
2019	Sweden U19	4	(0)
- * Club domestic league appearances and goals as of 31 December 2020 ‡ National team caps and goals as of 19 November 2019

Helmer Andersson (born 8 September 2001) is a Swedish football defender who plays for Karlslunds IF.
