= Serkan Bakan =

Turkish footballer

Personal information
- Date of birth: 1 January 2001 (age 25)
- Place of birth: Şehitkamil, Turkey
- Position: Central midfielder

Team information
- Current team: Ağrı 1970 SK
- Number: 27

Youth career
- 2013–2017: Gaziantepspor
- 2017–2020: Göztepe

Senior career*
Years	Team	Apps	(Gls)
2017	Gaziantepspor	2	(1)
2017–2020	Göztepe	0	(0)
2020–2021	Edirnespor	3	(0)
2021–2022	Siirt İl Özel İdaresi SK	25	(0)
2022–	Ağrı 1970 SK	1	(0)

International career^{‡}
2015	Turkey U14	3	(1)
2015–2016	Turkey U15	9	(2)
2016–2017	Turkey U16	12	(1)
2017–2018	Turkey U17	12	(1)
2018	Turkey U18	2	(0)
- * Club domestic league appearances and goals as of 13 November 2022 ‡ National team caps and goals as of 6 September 2018

Serkan Bakan (born 1 January 2001) is a Turkish footballer who plays as a midfielder for Ağrı 1970 SK.

== Professional career ==
Serkan made his professional debut for Gaziantepspor in a 4-0 Süper Lig loss to Beşiktaş on 28 May 2017. He was 16 years and 147 days of age, making him the third youngest player to debut for the Süper Lig. Serkan scored in his second professional game, a 4-1 loss to Antalyaspor on 2 June 2017, making him the first player born in the 21st century to score in the Süper Lig.
