= 2018 UEFA European Under-17 Championship squads =

List of national team squads

The following is a list of squads for each national team competing at the 2018 UEFA European Under-17 Championship in England. Each national team had to submit a squad of 20 players born on or after 1 January 2001.

Players in boldface have been capped at full international level at some point in their career.

== Group A ==
=== England ===
England named their squad on 3 May 2018.

Head coach: Steve Cooper

No.	Pos.	Player	Date of birth (age)	Club
1	GK	Luca Ashby-Hammond	25 March 2001 (aged 17)	(The Football Association) Fulham
2	DF	Dylan Crowe	13 April 2001 (aged 17)	(The Football Association) Ipswich Town
3	DF	Nathanael Ogbeta	18 April 2001 (aged 17)	(The Football Association) Manchester City
4	MF	James Garner	13 March 2001 (aged 17)	(The Football Association) Manchester United
5	DF	Ethan Laird	5 August 2001 (aged 16)	(The Football Association) Manchester United
6	DF	Aji Alese	17 January 2001 (aged 17)	(The Football Association) West Ham United
7	FW	Arvin Appiah	5 January 2001 (aged 17)	(The Football Association) Nottingham Forest
8	MF	Tommy Doyle	17 October 2001 (aged 16)	(The Football Association) Manchester City
9	FW	Tyreece John-Jules	14 February 2001 (aged 17)	(The Football Association) Arsenal
10	MF	Faustino Anjorin	23 November 2001 (aged 16)	(The Football Association) Chelsea
11	FW	Xavier Amaechi	5 January 2001 (aged 17)	(The Football Association) Arsenal
12	DF	Vontae Daley-Campbell	2 April 2001 (aged 17)	(The Football Association) Arsenal
13	GK	Marcus Dewhurst	20 March 2001 (aged 17)	(The Football Association) Sheffield United
14	MF	Elijah Dixon-Bonner	1 January 2001 (aged 17)	(The Football Association) Liverpool
15	FW	Bobby Duncan	25 June 2001 (aged 16)	Unattached
16	FW	Rayhaan Tulloch	20 January 2001 (aged 17)	(The Football Association) West Bromwich Albion
17	DF	**Bukayo Saka**	5 September 2001 (aged 16)	(The Football Association) Arsenal
18	MF	Trae Coyle	11 January 2001 (aged 17)	(The Football Association) Arsenal
19	MF	Matty Daly	10 March 2001 (aged 17)	(The Football Association) Huddersfield Town
20	FW	**Folarin Balogun**	3 July 2001 (aged 16)	(The Football Association) Arsenal

=== Switzerland ===
Switzerland named their squad on 26 April 2018.

Head coach: Stefan Marini

No.	Pos.	Player	Date of birth (age)	Club
1	GK	Lucio Soldini	5 April 2001 (aged 17)	(Swiss Football Association) Team Ticino
2	DF	Gianluca Romano	12 June 2001 (aged 16)	(Swiss Football Association) Young Boys
3	DF	Fabio Solimando	27 December 2001 (aged 16)	(Swiss Football Association) St. Gallen
4	DF	Ilan Sauter	6 February 2001 (aged 17)	(Swiss Football Association) FC Zürich
5	DF	**Becir Omeragic**	20 January 2002 (aged 16)	(Swiss Football Association) Servette
6	MF	Drilon Kastrati	23 October 2001 (aged 16)	(Swiss Football Association) Grasshopper Club
7	MF	Tician Tushi	2 April 2001 (aged 17)	(Swiss Football Association) Basel
8	MF	Alexandre Jankewitz	25 December 2001 (aged 16)	(Swiss Football Association) Servette
9	FW	Julian Vonmoos	1 April 2001 (aged 17)	(Swiss Football Association) Grasshopper Club
10	MF	**Bledian Krasniqi**	17 June 2001 (aged 16)	(Swiss Football Association) FC Zürich
11	FW	Felix Mambimbi	18 January 2001 (aged 17)	(Swiss Football Association) Young Boys
12	GK	Nils De Mol	3 May 2001 (aged 17)	(Swiss Football Association) Basel
13	DF	Jan Wörnhard	23 April 2001 (aged 17)	(Swiss Football Association) St. Gallen
14	MF	**Simon Sohm**	11 April 2001 (aged 17)	(Swiss Football Association) FC Zürich
15	DF	David Jacovic	5 February 2001 (aged 17)	(Swiss Football Association) St. Gallen
16	DF	Elias Mesonero	27 March 2001 (aged 17)	(Swiss Football Association) Grasshopper Club
17	MF	**Fabian Rieder**	16 February 2002 (aged 16)	(Swiss Football Association) Young Boys
18	FW	Uros Vasic	25 October 2001 (aged 16)	(Swiss Football Association) FC Thun
19	DF	Christian Witzig	9 January 2001 (aged 17)	(Swiss Football Association) St. Gallen
20	FW	Ruwen Werthmüller	28 January 2001 (aged 17)	(German Football Association) Hertha BSC

=== Italy ===
Italy named their squad on 1 May 2018.

Head coach: Carmine Nunziata

No.	Pos.	Player	Date of birth (age)	Club
1	GK	Alessandro Russo	31 March 2001 (aged 17)	(Italian Football Federation) Genoa
2	DF	Alberto Barazzetta	18 February 2001 (aged 17)	(Italian Football Federation) Milan
3	DF	Giorgio Brogni	28 January 2001 (aged 17)	(Italian Football Federation) Atalanta
4	MF	Giuseppe Leone	5 May 2001 (aged 16)	(Italian Football Federation) Juventus
5	DF	Nicolò Armini	7 March 2001 (aged 17)	(Italian Football Federation) Lazio
6	DF	Paolo Gozzi Iweru	25 April 2001 (aged 17)	(Italian Football Federation) Juventus
7	MF	**Samuele Ricci**	21 August 2001 (aged 16)	(Italian Football Federation) Empoli
8	MF	Manu Emmanuel Gyabuaa	21 September 2001 (aged 16)	(Italian Football Federation) Atalanta
9	FW	Edoardo Vergani	6 February 2001 (aged 17)	(Italian Football Federation) Internazionale
10	MF	Alessio Riccardi	3 April 2001 (aged 17)	(Italian Football Federation) Roma
11	FW	Andrea Mattioli	9 September 2001 (aged 16)	(Italian Football Federation) Sassuolo
12	GK	Ludovico Gelmi	2 May 2001 (aged 17)	(Italian Football Federation) Atalanta
13	DF	Fabio Ponsi	12 February 2001 (aged 17)	(Italian Football Federation) Fiorentina
14	DF	Stefano Vaghi	25 May 2001 (aged 16)	(Italian Football Federation) Internazionale
15	MF	**Nicolò Rovella**	4 December 2001 (aged 16)	(Italian Football Federation) Genoa
16	MF	Jean Freddi Greco	12 February 2001 (aged 17)	(Italian Football Federation) Roma
17	FW	**Nicolò Fagioli**	12 February 2001 (aged 17)	(Italian Football Federation) Juventus
18	DF	Francesco Semeraro	1 May 2001 (aged 17)	(Italian Football Federation) Roma
19	FW	Lorenzo Colombo	8 March 2002 (aged 16)	(Italian Football Federation) Milan
20	MF	Alessandro Cortinovis	25 January 2001 (aged 17)	(Italian Football Federation) Atalanta

=== Israel ===
Israel named their squad on 26 April 2018.

Head coach: Gadi Brumer

No.	Pos.	Player	Date of birth (age)	Club
1	GK	Shareef Keouf	25 June 2001 (aged 16)	(Israel Football Association) Maccabi Haifa
2	DF	Guy Hakim	30 January 2001 (aged 17)	(Israel Football Association) Bnei Yehuda
3	DF	Hanan Hen Biton	7 February 2001 (aged 17)	(Israel Football Association) Maccabi Haifa
4	MF	Dan Lugassy	27 February 2001 (aged 17)	(Israel Football Association) Maccabi Tel Aviv
5	DF	Rony Laufer	18 February 2001 (aged 17)	(Israel Football Association) Maccabi Haifa
6	MF	Mohammad Ghadir	10 January 2001 (aged 17)	(Israel Football Association) Maccabi Haifa
7	MF	**Ido Shahar**	20 August 2001 (aged 16)	(Israel Football Association) Maccabi Tel Aviv
8	MF	Omri Ram	24 March 2001 (aged 17)	(Israel Football Association) Maccabi Tel Aviv
9	FW	**Liel Abada**	3 October 2001 (aged 16)	(Israel Football Association) Maccabi Petah Tikva
10	MF	Ibrahim Jauabra	3 January 2001 (aged 17)	(Israel Football Association) Maccabi Haifa
11	FW	Ofek Ovadia	30 January 2001 (aged 17)	(Israel Football Association) Hapoel Tel Aviv
12	DF	Tom Achi Mordechay	9 May 2001 (aged 16)	(Israel Football Association) Hapoel Tel Aviv
13	FW	Osher Davida	18 February 2001 (aged 17)	(Israel Football Association) Hapoel Tel Aviv
14	MF	Daniel Tesker	28 September 2001 (aged 16)	(Israel Football Association) Maccabi Petah Tikva
15	MF	Nadav Niddam	11 April 2001 (aged 17)	(Israel Football Association) Maccabi Tel Aviv
16	MF	Amit Meir	1 July 2001 (aged 16)	(Israel Football Association) Hapoel Tel Aviv
17	FW	Eyal Einbrom	3 September 2001 (aged 16)	(Israel Football Association) Maccabi Petah Tikva
18	GK	Roy Baranes	12 July 2001 (aged 16)	(Israel Football Association) Hapoel Tel Aviv
19	DF	Nir Drori	25 December 2001 (aged 16)	(Israel Football Association) Ironi Nesher
20	FW	Ravve Assayag	1 May 2001 (aged 17)	(Israel Football Association) Maccabi Tel Aviv

== Group B ==
=== Slovenia ===
Slovenia named their squad on 23 April 2018.

Head coach: Agron Šalja

No.	Pos.	Player	Date of birth (age)	Club
1	GK	Domen Gril	10 June 2001 (aged 16)	(Football Association of Slovenia) Bravo
2	DF	Matevž Matko	9 October 2001 (aged 16)	(Football Association of Slovenia) Bravo
3	DF	Mark Španring	13 June 2001 (aged 16)	(Football Association of Slovenia) Krško
4	DF	Matija Burin	25 March 2001 (aged 17)	(Football Association of Slovenia) Olimpija
5	DF	Andraž Lipec	6 December 2001 (aged 16)	(Football Association of Slovenia) Krško
6	MF	Rok Maher	20 July 2001 (aged 16)	(Football Association of Slovenia) Maribor
7	FW	Martin Pečar	5 July 2002 (aged 15)	(Football Association of Slovenia) Olimpija
8	MF	**Jošt Urbančič**	12 April 2001 (aged 17)	(Football Association of Slovenia) Domžale
9	FW	Nik Prelec	10 June 2001 (aged 16)	(Italian Football Federation) Sampdoria
10	MF	**Tamar Svetlin**	30 July 2001 (aged 16)	(Football Association of Slovenia) Domžale
11	FW	Renato Simič	17 May 2001 (aged 16)	(Italian Football Federation) Fiorentina
12	GK	Alen Jurca	15 January 2001 (aged 17)	(Football Association of Slovenia) Maribor
13	MF	Anže Pucihar	5 March 2001 (aged 17)	(Italian Football Federation) Pescara
14	MF	Rok Frešer	2 March 2001 (aged 17)	(Football Association of Slovenia) Maribor
15	MF	Luka Verbič	29 November 2001 (aged 16)	(Football Association of Slovenia) Maribor
16	MF	Omar Kocar	6 June 2001 (aged 16)	(Austrian Football Association) Rapid Wien
17	FW	Mirko Mutavčić	29 January 2001 (aged 17)	(Football Association of Slovenia) Maribor
18	FW	Gašper Koritnik	6 January 2001 (aged 17)	(Football Association of Slovenia) Krško
19	FW	Nino Kukovec	6 May 2001 (aged 16)	(Italian Football Federation) Fiorentina
20	MF	Žiga Repas	29 May 2001 (aged 16)	(Football Association of Slovenia) Domžale

=== Norway ===
Norway named their squad on 18 April 2018.

Head coach: Gunnar Halle

No.	Pos.	Player	Date of birth (age)	Club
1	GK	Jørgen Johnsen	19 April 2001 (aged 17)	(Norwegian Football Federation) Strømsgodset
2	DF	Leo Cornic	2 January 2001 (aged 17)	(Norwegian Football Federation) Vålerenga
3	DF	Harald Martin Hauso	11 March 2001 (aged 17)	(Norwegian Football Federation) Vålerenga
4	DF	Helmer Rusten	4 March 2001 (aged 17)	(Norwegian Football Federation) Stabæk
5	MF	Sander Eng Strand	6 May 2001 (aged 17)	(Norwegian Football Federation) HamKam
6	MF	Thomas Rekdal	16 March 2001 (aged 17)	(Norwegian Football Federation) Fredrikstad
7	MF	Harald Nilsen Tangen	3 January 2001 (aged 17)	(Norwegian Football Federation) Viking
8	MF	**Kristoffer Askildsen**	9 January 2001 (aged 17)	(Norwegian Football Federation) Stabæk
9	FW	Noah Jean Holm	23 May 2001 (aged 16)	(German Football Association) RB Leipzig
10	FW	Oscar Aga	6 January 2001 (aged 17)	(Norwegian Football Federation) Stabæk
11	FW	Kornelius Hansen	6 May 2001 (aged 17)	(The Football Association) Southampton
12	GK	Rasmus Semundseth Sandberg	23 April 2001 (aged 17)	(Norwegian Football Federation) Rosenborg
13	MF	Bjørn Mæland	24 February 2001 (aged 17)	(Norwegian Football Federation) Odd
14	DF	Ole Martin Kolskogen	20 January 2001 (aged 17)	(Norwegian Football Federation) Åsane
15	MF	Sander Christiansen	29 April 2001 (aged 17)	(Norwegian Football Federation) Brann
16	MF	Joshua Kitolano	3 August 2001 (aged 16)	(Norwegian Football Federation) Odd
17	MF	Runar Hauge	1 September 2001 (aged 16)	(Norwegian Football Federation) Bodø/Glimt
18	MF	Mathias Kjølø	27 June 2001 (aged 16)	(Royal Dutch Football Association) PSV Eindhoven
19	FW	**Josef Baccay**	29 April 2001 (aged 17)	(Norwegian Football Federation) Lillestrøm
21	DF	Jonathan Lein Valberg	15 January 2001 (aged 17)	(Norwegian Football Federation) Levanger

=== Portugal ===
Portugal named their squad on 1 May 2018.

Head coach: Rui Bento

No.	Pos.	Player	Date of birth (age)	Club
1	GK	João Monteiro	7 May 2001 (aged 16)	(Portuguese Football Federation) Benfica
2	DF	Tomás Tavares	7 March 2001 (aged 17)	(Portuguese Football Federation) Benfica
3	DF	Tiago Matos	22 January 2001 (aged 17)	(Portuguese Football Federation) Porto
4	DF	Levi Faustino	31 August 2001 (aged 16)	(Portuguese Football Federation) Porto
5	DF	Rafael Brito	19 January 2002 (aged 16)	(Portuguese Football Federation) Benfica
6	MF	Henrique Jocú	9 September 2001 (aged 16)	(Portuguese Football Federation) Benfica
7	FW	Umaro Embaló	6 May 2001 (aged 16)	(Portuguese Football Federation) Benfica
8	MF	Nuno Cunha	11 January 2001 (aged 17)	(Portuguese Football Federation) Benfica
9	MF	Eduardo Ribeiro	14 January 2001 (aged 17)	(Portuguese Football Federation) Braga
10	MF	Rodrigo Valente	15 February 2001 (aged 17)	(Portuguese Football Federation) Porto
11	FW	Jair Tavares	13 February 2001 (aged 17)	(Portuguese Football Federation) Benfica
12	GK	Gonçalo Tabuaço	11 March 2001 (aged 17)	(Portuguese Football Federation) Vitória de Guimarães
13	DF	Francisco Saldanha	19 March 2001 (aged 17)	(Portuguese Football Federation) Benfica
14	DF	João Ferreira	22 March 2001 (aged 17)	(Portuguese Football Federation) Benfica
15	MF	Bernardo Silva	31 May 2001 (aged 16)	(Portuguese Football Federation) Benfica
16	FW	Félix Correia	22 January 2001 (aged 17)	(Portuguese Football Federation) Sporting CP
17	FW	Henrique Pereira	15 February 2002 (aged 16)	(Portuguese Football Federation) Benfica
18	MF	Rodrigo Fernandes	23 March 2001 (aged 17)	(Portuguese Football Federation) Sporting CP
19	FW	**Fábio Silva**	19 July 2002 (aged 15)	(Portuguese Football Federation) Porto
20	MF	**Gonçalo Ramos**	20 June 2001 (aged 16)	(Portuguese Football Federation) Benfica

=== Sweden ===
Sweden named their squad on 17 April 2018.

Head coach: Roger Franzén

No.	Pos.	Player	Date of birth (age)	Club
1	GK	Simon Andersson	15 January 2001 (aged 17)	(Swedish Football Association) Halmstads BK
2	DF	Isac Larsson	1 February 2001 (aged 17)	(Swedish Football Association) Halmstads BK
3	DF	**Adam Ben Lamin**	2 June 2001 (aged 16)	(Swedish Football Association) Vasalunds IF
4	DF	Helmer Andersson	8 September 2001 (aged 16)	(Swedish Football Association) Örebro SK
5	DF	Hampus Svensson	23 May 2001 (aged 16)	(Swedish Football Association) Kalmar FF
6	DF	Teodor Stenshagen	11 February 2001 (aged 17)	(Swedish Football Association) GIF Sundsvall
7	MF	Fredrik Hammar	26 February 2001 (aged 17)	(Swedish Football Association) IF Brommapojkarna
8	MF	**Kevin Ackermann**	24 May 2001 (aged 16)	(Swedish Football Association) BK Häcken
9	FW	Alex Timossi Andersson	19 January 2001 (aged 17)	(Swedish Football Association) Helsingborgs IF
10	MF	Manasse Kusu	22 December 2001 (aged 16)	(Swedish Football Association) IFK Norrköping
11	FW	**Jack Lahne**	24 October 2001 (aged 16)	(Swedish Football Association) IF Brommapojkarna
12	GK	Kristoffer Westerberg	25 April 2001 (aged 17)	(Swedish Football Association) IF Brommapojkarna
13	MF	Amel Mujanic	1 April 2001 (aged 17)	(Swedish Football Association) Malmö FF
14	DF	Rasmus Wikström	18 March 2001 (aged 17)	(Swedish Football Association) IFK Göteborg
15	MF	Sylvin Ilolo	6 June 2001 (aged 16)	(Swedish Football Association) IK Sirius
16	FW	**Benjamin Nygren**	8 July 2001 (aged 16)	(Swedish Football Association) IFK Göteborg
17	MF	Noah Alexandersson	30 September 2001 (aged 16)	(Swedish Football Association) IFK Göteborg
18	FW	Julian Larsson	21 April 2001 (aged 17)	(Swedish Football Association) AIK
19	MF	Victor Backman	16 March 2001 (aged 17)	(Swedish Football Association) Kalmar FF
20	DF	Samuel Ohlsson	13 May 2001 (aged 16)	(Swedish Football Association) IFK Göteborg

== Group C ==
=== Republic of Ireland ===
Republic of Ireland named their squad on 4 May 2018.

Head coach: Colin O'Brien

No.	Pos.	Player	Date of birth (age)	Club
1	GK	Kian Clarke	9 May 2001 (aged 16)	(Football Association of Ireland) Shamrock Rovers
2	DF	Max Murphy	2 June 2001 (aged 16)	(The Football Association) Stoke City
3	DF	Kameron Ledwidge	7 April 2001 (aged 17)	(The Football Association) Southampton
4	DF	Oisin McEntee	5 January 2001 (aged 17)	(The Football Association) Newcastle United
5	DF	**Nathan Collins**	30 April 2001 (aged 17)	(The Football Association) Stoke City
6	MF	**Jason Knight**	13 February 2001 (aged 17)	(The Football Association) Derby County
7	MF	Callum Thompson	20 April 2001 (aged 17)	(The Football Association) Wolves
8	MF	Barry Coffey	27 March 2001 (aged 17)	(Scottish Football Association) Celtic
9	FW	**Adam Idah**	11 February 2001 (aged 17)	(The Football Association) Norwich City
10	FW	**Troy Parrott**	4 February 2002 (aged 16)	(The Football Association) Tottenham Hotspur
11	MF	Sean Brennan	5 July 2001 (aged 16)	(The Football Association) Southampton
12	MF	Marc Walsh	15 March 2001 (aged 17)	(Football Association of Wales) Swansea City
13	DF	Ray O'Sullivan	3 July 2001 (aged 16)	(The Football Association) Wolves
14	MF	Adam O'Reilly	11 May 2001 (aged 16)	(The Football Association) Preston North End
15	FW	Jordan McEneff	8 January 2001 (aged 17)	(The Football Association) Arsenal
16	GK	Jimmy Corcoran	1 February 2002 (aged 16)	(Football Association of Ireland) Cherry Orchard
17	FW	Tyreik Wright	22 September 2001 (aged 16)	(The Football Association) Aston Villa
18	DF	Luca Connell	20 April 2001 (aged 17)	(The Football Association) Bolton Wanderers
19	FW	Ryan Cassidy	2 March 2001 (aged 17)	(The Football Association) Watford
20	MF	Conor Grant	23 July 2001 (aged 16)	(The Football Association) Sheffield Wednesday

=== Bosnia and Herzegovina ===
Bosnia and Herzegovina named their squad on 24 April 2018.

Head coach: Sakib Malkočević

No.	Pos.	Player	Date of birth (age)	Club
1	GK	Luka Kačavenda	1 November 2001 (aged 16)	(Football Association of Serbia) Vojvodina
2	DF	Elvir Muminović	2 March 2001 (aged 17)	(Swiss Football Association) Sion
3	DF	Dino Islamović	23 January 2001 (aged 17)	(Football Association of Bosnia and Herzegovina) Sarajevo
4	MF	Dragan Matković	9 June 2001 (aged 16)	(Football Association of Serbia) Vojvodina
5	DF	Stefan Rankić	13 January 2001 (aged 17)	(German Football Association) Union Berlin
6	DF	Robert Voloder	9 May 2001 (aged 16)	(German Football Association) Köln
7	MF	Edin Mujić	27 January 2001 (aged 17)	(Football Association of Bosnia and Herzegovina) Željezničar
8	MF	Alen Mehić	23 February 2001 (aged 17)	(Italian Football Federation) Atalanta
9	FW	Kristijan Stanić	20 April 2001 (aged 17)	(Football Association of Bosnia and Herzegovina) Zrinjski
10	FW	Ajdin Hasić	17 February 2001 (aged 17)	(Croatian Football Federation) Dinamo Zagreb
11	FW	Denil Badžak	2 March 2001 (aged 17)	(German Football Association) Augsburg
12	GK	**Belmin Dizdarević**	9 August 2001 (aged 16)	(Football Association of Bosnia and Herzegovina) Sarajevo
13	DF	Nemanja Nikolić	21 February 2001 (aged 17)	(Football Association of Bosnia and Herzegovina) Sarajevo
14	MF	Farid Baćevac	17 February 2001 (aged 17)	(German Football Association) Köln
15	DF	**Andrej Đokanović**	1 March 2001 (aged 17)	(Football Association of Bosnia and Herzegovina) Sarajevo
16	DF	Asim Muratović	7 May 2001 (aged 16)	(Football Association of Bosnia and Herzegovina) Sloboda Tuzla
17	FW	Malik Memišević	15 July 2001 (aged 16)	(German Football Association) Werder Bremen
18	DF	Vedad Radonja	6 September 2001 (aged 16)	(Croatian Football Federation) Dinamo Zagreb
19	FW	Elmin Herić	14 March 2001 (aged 17)	(German Football Association) Köln
20	MF	Armin Šarić	21 March 2001 (aged 17)	(Football Association of Bosnia and Herzegovina) Sarajevo

=== Denmark ===
Denmark named their squad on 16 April 2018.

Head coach: Michael Pedersen

No.	Pos.	Player	Date of birth (age)	Club
1	GK	Andreas Søndergaard	17 January 2001 (aged 17)	(The Football Association) Wolves
2	DF	Mikkel Lassen	19 June 2001 (aged 16)	(Danish Football Association) AGF
3	DF	Mathias Ross	15 January 2001 (aged 17)	(Danish Football Association) AaB
4	DF	Tobias Anker	6 March 2001 (aged 17)	(Danish Football Association) Midtjylland
5	DF	Christoffer Petersen	13 January 2001 (aged 17)	(Danish Football Association) Randers Freja
6	MF	Jacob Steen Christensen	25 June 2001 (aged 16)	(Danish Football Association) Nordsjælland
7	FW	Oliver Villadsen	16 November 2001 (aged 16)	(Danish Football Association) Nordsjælland
8	MF	Jeppe Pedersen	3 March 2001 (aged 17)	(Danish Football Association) AaB
9	FW	Muamer Brajanac	15 February 2001 (aged 17)	(Danish Football Association) Brøndby
10	FW	Nikolas Dyhr	18 June 2001 (aged 16)	(Danish Football Association) Midtjylland
11	FW	Oliver Tølbøll Rimmen	7 May 2001 (aged 16)	(Danish Football Association) Nordsjælland
12	MF	**Gustav Isaksen**	19 April 2001 (aged 17)	(Danish Football Association) Midtjylland
14	MF	**Morten Frendrup**	7 April 2001 (aged 17)	(Danish Football Association) Brøndby
15	DF	Thomas Gundelund	6 November 2001 (aged 16)	(Danish Football Association) Vejle BK
16	GK	Daniel Andersen	31 May 2001 (aged 16)	(Danish Football Association) AGF
17	FW	Gustav Mogensen	19 April 2001 (aged 17)	(Danish Football Association) AGF
18	FW	Andreas Kirkeby	1 February 2001 (aged 17)	(Danish Football Association) København
20	MF	Andreas Pyndt Andersen	4 March 2001 (aged 17)	(Danish Football Association) Brøndby
21	FW	Mikkel Kaufmann	3 January 2001 (aged 17)	(Danish Football Association) AaB
24	DF	Thomas Christiansen	19 April 2001 (aged 17)	(Danish Football Association) AaB

=== Belgium ===
Belgium named their squad on 23 April 2018.

Head coach: Thierry Siquet

No.	Pos.	Player	Date of birth (age)	Club
1	GK	Nick Shinton	10 May 2001 (aged 16)	(Royal Belgian Football Association) Club Brugge
2	DF	Lucas Lissens	25 July 2001 (aged 16)	(Royal Belgian Football Association) Anderlecht
3	DF	Siebe Vandermeulen	2 January 2001 (aged 17)	(Royal Belgian Football Association) Genk
4	MF	Lars Dendoncker	3 April 2001 (aged 17)	(Royal Belgian Football Association) Club Brugge
5	DF	Loïc Masscho	2 October 2001 (aged 16)	(Royal Belgian Football Association) Anderlecht
6	MF	**Nicolas Raskin**	23 February 2001 (aged 17)	(Royal Belgian Football Association) Gent
7	FW	Yorbe Vertessen	8 January 2001 (aged 17)	(Royal Dutch Football Association) PSV Eindhoven
8	MF	**Yari Verschaeren**	12 July 2001 (aged 16)	(Royal Belgian Football Association) Anderlecht
9	FW	Gabriel Lemoine	26 March 2001 (aged 17)	(Royal Belgian Football Association) Club Brugge
10	FW	Mathis Suray	26 July 2001 (aged 16)	(Royal Belgian Football Association) Anderlecht
11	FW	Sekou Sidibe	5 May 2001 (aged 16)	(Royal Dutch Football Association) PSV Eindhoven
12	GK	Maarten Vandevoordt	26 February 2002 (aged 16)	(Royal Belgian Football Association) Genk
13	MF	Elias Sierra	25 August 2001 (aged 16)	(Royal Belgian Football Association) Genk
14	DF	**Killian Sardella**	2 May 2002 (aged 16)	(Royal Belgian Football Association) Anderlecht
15	MF	Halim Timassi	1 September 2001 (aged 16)	(Royal Belgian Football Association) Anderlecht
16	FW	Largie Ramazani	27 February 2001 (aged 17)	(The Football Association) Manchester United
17	MF	**Amadou Onana**	16 August 2001 (aged 16)	(German Football Association) TSG Hoffenheim
18	FW	Tibo Persyn	13 March 2002 (aged 16)	(Royal Belgian Football Association) Club Brugge
19	FW	Jamie Yayi Mpie	22 May 2001 (aged 16)	(Italian Football Federation) Sampdoria
20	FW	**Jérémy Doku**	27 May 2002 (aged 15)	(Royal Belgian Football Association) Anderlecht

== Group D ==
=== Serbia ===
Serbia named their squad on 24 April 2018.

Head coach: Ivan Jević

No.	Pos.	Player	Date of birth (age)	Club
1	GK	Luka Krstović	31 May 2001 (aged 16)	(Football Association of Serbia) Red Star Belgrade
2	DF	Stefan Radmanovac	8 September 2001 (aged 16)	(Football Association of Serbia) Partizan
3	DF	Matija Gočobija	18 January 2001 (aged 17)	(Football Association of Serbia) Kiker
4	MF	**Kristijan Belić**	25 March 2001 (aged 17)	(The Football Association) West Ham United
5	DF	Bojan Balaž	5 January 2001 (aged 17)	(Football Association of Serbia) Partizan
6	DF	**Strahinja Eraković**	22 January 2001 (aged 17)	(Football Association of Serbia) Red Star Belgrade
7	FW	Marko Dedijer	8 May 2001 (aged 16)	(Football Association of Serbia) Red Star Belgrade
8	MF	**Ivan Ilić**	17 March 2001 (aged 17)	(Football Association of Serbia) Red Star Belgrade
9	FW	Borisav Burmaz	21 April 2001 (aged 17)	(Football Association of Serbia) Red Star Belgrade
10	MF	Milutin Vidosavljević	21 February 2001 (aged 17)	(Football Association of Serbia) Čukarički
11	FW	Dragoljub Savić	25 April 2001 (aged 17)	(Football Association of Serbia) Vojvodina
12	GK	Lazar Slavković	3 March 2002 (aged 16)	(Football Association of Serbia) Partizan
13	MF	Nikola Marjanović	21 May 2001 (aged 16)	(Football Association of Serbia) Brodarac
14	DF	Danilo Mitrović	21 March 2001 (aged 17)	(Football Association of Serbia) Vojvodina
15	MF	Martin Novaković	15 January 2001 (aged 17)	(Football Association of Serbia) Partizan
16	DF	Đorđe Jovanović	7 January 2001 (aged 17)	(Football Association of Serbia) Brodarac
17	FW	Njegoš Kupusović	22 February 2001 (aged 17)	(Football Association of Serbia) Red Star Belgrade
18	FW	Jovan Đermanović	21 February 2001 (aged 17)	(German Football Association) VfB Stuttgart
19	MF	Dejan Zukić	7 May 2001 (aged 16)	(Football Association of Serbia) Vojvodina
20	MF	Bogdan Jočić	11 January 2001 (aged 17)	(Football Association of Serbia) Red Star Belgrade

=== Netherlands ===
Netherlands named their squad on 23 April 2018.

Head coach: Kees van Wonderen

No.	Pos.	Player	Date of birth (age)	Club
1	GK	Mees Bakker	11 March 2001 (aged 17)	(Royal Dutch Football Association) AZ
2	DF	**Shurandy Sambo**	19 August 2001 (aged 16)	(Royal Dutch Football Association) PSV Eindhoven
3	DF	**Liam van Gelderen**	23 March 2001 (aged 17)	(Royal Dutch Football Association) Ajax
4	DF	Ramon Hendriks	18 July 2001 (aged 16)	(Royal Dutch Football Association) Feyenoord
5	DF	Nordin Musampa	13 October 2001 (aged 16)	(Royal Dutch Football Association) Ajax
6	MF	Bram Franken	14 February 2001 (aged 17)	(Royal Dutch Football Association) AZ
7	FW	Nigel Thomas	1 February 2001 (aged 17)	(Royal Dutch Football Association) PSV Eindhoven
8	MF	Wouter Burger	16 February 2001 (aged 17)	(Royal Dutch Football Association) Feyenoord
9	FW	Daishawn Redan	2 February 2001 (aged 17)	(The Football Association) Chelsea
10	FW	**Quinten Timber**	17 June 2001 (aged 16)	(Royal Dutch Football Association) Ajax
11	FW	Mohammed Ihattaren	12 February 2002 (aged 16)	(Royal Dutch Football Association) PSV Eindhoven
12	MF	**Ryan Gravenberch**	16 May 2002 (aged 15)	(Royal Dutch Football Association) Ajax
13	FW	Elayis Tavşan	30 April 2001 (aged 17)	(Royal Dutch Football Association) Sparta Rotterdam
14	FW	Christopher Mamengi	3 April 2001 (aged 17)	(Royal Dutch Football Association) FC Utrecht
15	DF	**Jurriën Timber**	17 June 2001 (aged 16)	(Royal Dutch Football Association) Ajax
16	GK	Joey Koorevaar	22 February 2001 (aged 17)	(Royal Dutch Football Association) Feyenoord
17	FW	**Crysencio Summerville**	30 October 2001 (aged 16)	(Royal Dutch Football Association) Feyenoord
18	FW	**Brian Brobbey**	1 February 2002 (aged 16)	(Royal Dutch Football Association) Ajax
19	FW	Toshio Lake	26 March 2001 (aged 17)	(Royal Dutch Football Association) Feyenoord
20	MF	Kenzo Goudmijn	18 December 2001 (aged 16)	(Royal Dutch Football Association) Jong AZ

=== Germany ===
Germany named their squad on 25 April 2018.

Head coach: Michael Prus

No.	Pos.	Player	Date of birth (age)	Club
1	GK	Luca Unbehaun	27 February 2001 (aged 17)	(German Football Association) Borussia Dortmund
2	DF	Ramzi Ferjani	11 April 2001 (aged 17)	(German Football Association) Borussia Dortmund
3	DF	Noah Katterbach	13 April 2001 (aged 17)	(German Football Association) FC Köln
4	DF	Antonis Aidonis	22 May 2001 (aged 16)	(German Football Association) TSG Hoffenheim
5	DF	Kevin Bukusu	27 February 2001 (aged 17)	(German Football Association) Bayer Leverkusen
6	MF	Tom Krauß	22 June 2001 (aged 16)	(German Football Association) RB Leipzig
8	MF	Matondo-Merveille Papela	18 January 2001 (aged 17)	(German Football Association) Mainz
9	FW	Leon Dajaku	12 April 2001 (aged 17)	(German Football Association) Stuttgart
10	MF	Amid Khan Agha	6 June 2001 (aged 16)	(German Football Association) TSG Hoffenheim
11	FW	Oliver Batista Meier	16 February 2001 (aged 17)	(German Football Association) Bayern Munich
12	GK	Daniel Klein	13 March 2001 (aged 17)	(German Football Association) TSG Hoffenheim
13	DF	Louis Poznanski	24 May 2001 (aged 16)	(German Football Association) Bayern Munich
14	DF	Robin Kölle	17 February 2001 (aged 17)	(German Football Association) Wolfsburg
16	MF	Can Bozdogan	5 April 2001 (aged 17)	(German Football Association) FC Köln
17	FW	Fabrice Hartmann	2 March 2001 (aged 17)	(German Football Association) RB Leipzig
18	MF	Max Brandt	2 June 2001 (aged 16)	(German Football Association) Wolfsburg
19	FW	Kevin Grimm	14 February 2001 (aged 17)	(German Football Association) Stuttgart
20	MF	Per Lockl	7 March 2001 (aged 17)	(German Football Association) Stuttgart
21	MF	Jonas Pfalz	8 January 2001 (aged 17)	(German Football Association) Borussia Mönchengladbach
22	DF	Lenny Borges	30 April 2001 (aged 17)	(German Football Association) Hamburger SV

=== Spain ===
Spain named their squad on 23 April 2018.

Head coach: Santi Denia

No.	Pos.	Player	Date of birth (age)	Club
1	GK	Arnau Tenas	30 May 2001 (aged 16)	(Royal Spanish Football Federation) Barcelona
2	DF	Alpha Diounkou	10 October 2001 (aged 16)	(The Football Association) Manchester City
3	DF	Miguel Gutiérrez	27 June 2001 (aged 16)	(Royal Spanish Football Federation) Real Madrid
4	DF	**Eric García**	9 January 2001 (aged 17)	(The Football Association) Manchester City
5	DF	Ismael Armenteros	7 April 2001 (aged 17)	(Royal Spanish Football Federation) Real Madrid
6	MF	Iván Morante	15 January 2001 (aged 17)	(Royal Spanish Football Federation) CD Roda
7	MF	**Álex Baena**	20 June 2001 (aged 16)	(Royal Spanish Football Federation) CD Roda
8	MF	Arnau Puigmal	10 January 2001 (aged 17)	(The Football Association) Manchester United
9	FW	Sergio Camello	10 February 2001 (aged 17)	(Royal Spanish Football Federation) Atlético Madrid B
10	FW	Nabil Touaizi	1 February 2001 (aged 17)	(The Football Association) Manchester City
11	FW	**Bryan Gil**	11 February 2001 (aged 17)	(Royal Spanish Football Federation) Sevilla
12	DF	Xavi Estacio	24 March 2001 (aged 17)	(Royal Spanish Football Federation) Valencia
13	GK	Joan García	4 May 2001 (aged 17)	(Royal Spanish Football Federation) RCD Espanyol
14	DF	Alejandro Pérez	7 January 2001 (aged 17)	(Royal Spanish Football Federation) RCD Espanyol
15	MF	Xavi Sintes	5 August 2001 (aged 16)	(Royal Spanish Football Federation) San Francisco
16	MF	Óscar Castro	20 June 2001 (aged 16)	(Royal Spanish Football Federation) Atlético Madrid
17	DF	Jon Pacheco	8 January 2001 (aged 17)	(Royal Spanish Football Federation) Real Sociedad
18	MF	Adrián Bernabé	26 May 2001 (aged 16)	(Royal Spanish Football Federation) Barcelona
19	FW	Nils Mortimer	11 June 2001 (aged 16)	(Royal Spanish Football Federation) Barcelona
20	FW	Víctor Mollejo	21 January 2001 (aged 17)	(Royal Spanish Football Federation) Atlético Madrid B
