= 2018 UEFA European Under-17 Championship =

Tournament details
- Host country: England
- Dates: 4–20 May
- Teams: 16
- Venues: 6 (in 5 host cities)

Final positions
- Champions: Netherlands (3rd title)
- Runners-up: Italy

Tournament statistics
- Matches played: 31
- Goals scored: 73 (2.35 per match)
- Attendance: 57,502 (1,855 per match)
- Top scorer(s): (Belgium) Yorbe Vertessen (Italy) Edoardo Vergani (4 goals each)

The 2018 UEFA European Under-17 Championship (also known as 2018 UEFA Under-17 Euro) was the 17th edition of the UEFA European Under-17 Championship (36th edition if the Under-16 era is also included), the annual international youth football championship organised by UEFA for the men's under-17 national teams of Europe. England, which were selected by UEFA on 26 January 2015, hosted the tournament.

A total of 16 teams played in the tournament, with players born on or after 1 January 2001 eligible to participate. Each match had a duration of 80 minutes, consisting of two halves of 40 minutes with a 15-minute half-time.

The Netherlands won their third title by beating Italy 4–1 on penalties in the final after a 2–2 draw. England were the defending champions, but were eliminated by Belgium in the quarter-finals.

== Qualification ==
All 55 UEFA nations entered the competition (including Kosovo who entered for the first time), and with the hosts England qualifying automatically, the other 54 teams competed in the qualifying competition to determine the remaining 15 spots in the final tournament. The qualifying competition consisted of two rounds: Qualifying round, which took place in autumn 2017, and Elite round, which took place in spring 2018.

=== Qualified teams ===
The following teams qualified for the final tournament.

Note: All appearance statistics include only U-17 era (since 2002).

Team	Method of qualification	Appearance	Last appearance	Previous best performance
England	Hosts	13th	2017 (runners-up)	Champions (2010, 2014)
Serbia	Elite round Group 1 winners	7th	2017 (group stage)	Quarter-finals (2002)
Spain	Elite round Group 1 runners-up	12th	2017 (champions)	Champions (2007, 2008, 2017)
Sweden	Elite round Group 2 winners	3rd	2016 (quarter-finals)	Semi-finals (2013)
Belgium	Elite round Group 2 runners-up	6th	2016 (quarter-finals)	Semi-finals (2007, 2015)
Republic of Ireland	Elite round Group 3 winners	4th	2017 (quarter-finals)	Quarter-finals (2017)
Switzerland	Elite round Group 4 winners	8th	2014 (group stage)	Champions (2002)
Portugal	Elite round Group 4 runners-up	7th	2016 (champions)	Champions (2003, 2016)
Netherlands	Elite round Group 5 winners	12th	2017 (quarter-finals)	Champions (2011, 2012)
Italy	Elite round Group 5 runners-up	8th	2017 (group stage)	Runners-up (2013)
Bosnia and Herzegovina	Elite round Group 6 winners	3rd	2017 (group stage)	Group stage (2016, 2017)
Denmark	Elite round Group 6 runners-up	5th	2016 (group stage)	Semi-finals (2011)
Slovenia	Elite round Group 7 winners	3rd	2015 (group stage)	Group stage (2012, 2015)
Israel	Elite round Group 7 runners-up	3rd	2005 (group stage)	Group stage (2003, 2005)
Norway	Elite round Group 8 winners	2nd	2017 (group stage)	Group stage (2017)
Germany	Elite round Group 8 runners-up	11th	2017 (semi-finals)	Champions (2009)

Notes

1. The best seven runners-up among all eight elite round groups qualified for the final tournament.

=== Final draw ===
The final draw was held on 5 April 2018, 17:30 BST (UTC+1), at the St George's Park in Burton, England. The 16 teams were drawn into four groups of four teams. Hosts England were assigned to position A1 in the draw, while the other teams were seeded according to their results in the qualification elite round, with the seven best elite round group winners (counting all elite round results) placed in Pot 1 and drawn to positions 1 and 2 in the groups, and the remaining eight teams (the eighth-best elite round group winner and the seven elite round group runners-up) placed in Pot 2 and drawn to positions 3 and 4 in the groups.

Pos	Grp	Team	Pld	W	D	L	GF	GA	GD	Pts	Seeding
1	—	England (H)	0	0	0	0	0	0	0	0	Host (A1)
2	3	Republic of Ireland	3	3	0	0	6	0	+6	9	Pot 1
3	5	Netherlands	3	3	0	0	6	1	+5	9	Pot 1
4	1	Serbia	3	2	1	0	6	1	+5	7	Pot 1
5	8	Norway	3	2	1	0	7	3	+4	7	Pot 1
6	7	Slovenia	3	2	1	0	6	2	+4	7	Pot 1
7	4	Switzerland	3	2	1	0	7	4	+3	7	Pot 1
8	6	Bosnia and Herzegovina	3	2	0	1	4	4	0	6	Pot 1
9	2	Sweden	3	1	2	0	1	0	+1	5	Pot 2
10	4	Portugal	3	2	1	0	5	2	+3	7	Pot 2
11	7	Israel	3	2	0	1	6	4	+2	6	Pot 2
12	6	Denmark	3	2	0	1	3	2	+1	6 (Note: Ranked by disciplinary points (Denmark: 4 pts; Italy: 6 pts).)	Pot 2
13	5	Italy	3	2	0	1	3	2	+1	6	Pot 2
14	1	Spain	3	1	2	0	4	2	+2	5	Pot 2
15	8	Germany	3	1	1	1	5	3	+2	4	Pot 2
16	2	Belgium	3	1	1	1	3	3	0	4	Pot 2

Source: UEFA
Rules for classification: 1) points; 2) goal difference; 3) goals scored; 4) disciplinary points; 5) coefficient; 6) drawing of lots.
(H) Hosts

== Venues ==
The tournament took place at six venues across the Midlands and South Yorkshire. England's opening match took place at the Proact Stadium in Chesterfield with the final taking place at the New York Stadium in Rotherham.

2018 UEFA European Under-17 Championship is located in Northern England	Rotherham	Chesterfield	Walsall
2018 UEFA European Under-17 Championship is located in Northern England	New York Stadium	Proact Stadium	Bescot Stadium
2018 UEFA European Under-17 Championship is located in Northern England	Capacity: 12,023	Capacity: 10,504	Capacity: 11,300
2018 UEFA European Under-17 Championship is located in Northern England	Burton		Loughborough
2018 UEFA European Under-17 Championship is located in Northern England	Pirelli Stadium	St George's Park	Loughborough University Stadium
2018 UEFA European Under-17 Championship is located in Northern England	Capacity: 6,912	Capacity: 499	Capacity: 3,300

== Match officials ==
A total of 8 referees, 12 assistant referees and 4 fourth officials were appointed for the final tournament.

Referees

- (Croatia) Tihomir Pejin
- (Czech Republic) Zbynek Proske
- (Estonia) Juri Frischer
- (Republic of Ireland) Robert Harvey
- (Iceland) Vilhjálmur Alvar Thórarinsson
- (Netherlands) Dennis Higler
- (Romania) Horațiu Feșnic
- (Turkey) Halil Umut Meler

Assistant referees

- (Austria) Robert Steinacher
- (Azerbaijan) Rza Mammadov
- (Bulgaria) Georgi Doynov
- (Faroe Islands) Dan Petur Pauli Højgaard
- (Georgia (country)) Levan Todria
- (Greece) Chasan Koula
- (Hungary) Péter Kóbor
- (Kazakhstan) Yuriy Tikhonyuk
- (Lithuania) Vytis Snarskis
- (Moldova) Vladislav Lifciu
- (Scotland) Douglas Potter
- (Ukraine) Volodymyr Vysotskyi

Fourth officials

- (Republic of Ireland) Robert Hennessy
- (Northern Ireland) Keith Kennedy
- (Northern Ireland) Tim Marshall
- (Wales) Bryn Markham-Jones

== Squads ==
Each national team submitted a squad of 20 players (Regulations Article 40).

== Group stage ==
The final tournament schedule was confirmed on 10 April 2018.

The group winners and runners-up advance to the quarter-finals.

Tiebreakers

In the group stage, teams are ranked according to points (3 points for a win, 1 point for a draw, 0 points for a loss), and if tied on points, the following tiebreaking criteria are applied, in the order given, to determine the rankings (Regulations Articles 17.01 and 17.02):

1. Points in head-to-head matches among tied teams;
2. Goal difference in head-to-head matches among tied teams;
3. Goals scored in head-to-head matches among tied teams;
4. If more than two teams are tied, and after applying all head-to-head criteria above, a subset of teams are still tied, all head-to-head criteria above are reapplied exclusively to this subset of teams;
5. Goal difference in all group matches;
6. Goals scored in all group matches;
7. Penalty shoot-out if only two teams have the same number of points, and they met in the last round of the group and are tied after applying all criteria above (not used if more than two teams have the same number of points, or if their rankings are not relevant for qualification for the next stage);
8. Disciplinary points (red card = 3 points, yellow card = 1 point, expulsion for two yellow cards in one match = 3 points);
9. UEFA coefficient for the qualifying round draw;
10. Drawing of lots.

All times are local, BST (UTC+1).

=== Group A ===
Pos	Team	Pld	W	D	L	GF	GA	GD	Pts	Qualification
1	Italy	3	2	0	1	5	2	+3	6 (Note: Head-to-head results: Italy 2–0 Switzerland, England 2–1 Italy, Switzerland 1–0 England. Head-to-head standings: Italy: 3 pts, +1 GD; England: 3 pts, 0 GD; Switzerland: 3 pts, −1 GD)	Knockout stage
2	England (H)	3	2	0	1	4	3	+1	6	Knockout stage
3	Switzerland	3	2	0	1	4	2	+2	6	
4	Israel	3	0	0	3	1	7	−6	0	

Source: UEFA
Rules for classification: Group stage tiebreakers
(H) Hosts
Notes:
4 May 2018
13:00

Italy	2–0	Switzerland
Greco 22'; Vergani 64'	Report

St George's Park, Burton
Attendance: 488
Referee: Zbyněk Proske (Czech Republic)
4 May 2018
19:00

England	2–1	Israel
Doyle 29' (pen.); Daly 61'	Report	Lugassy 40+1' (pen.)

Proact Stadium, Chesterfield
Attendance: 6,102
Referee: Halil Umut Meler (Turkey)

7 May 2018
12:30

Switzerland	3–0	Israel
Mambimbi 10', 38'; Tushi 47'	Report

St George's Park, Burton
Attendance: 259
Referee: Juri Frischer (Estonia)
7 May 2018
15:00

England	2–1	Italy
Appiah 64'; Doyle 69' (pen.)	Report	Riccardi 14'

Bescot Stadium, Walsall
Attendance: 7,159
Referee: Vilhjalmur Thorarinsson (Iceland)

10 May 2018
19:00

Switzerland	1–0	England
Mambimbi 40+1'	Report

New York Stadium, Rotherham
Attendance: 6,146
Referee: Horatiu Fesnic (Romania)
10 May 2018
19:00

Israel	0–2	Italy
	Report	Gyabuaa 48'; Vergani 55'

St George's Park, Burton
Attendance: 288
Referee: Tihomir Pejin (Croatia)

=== Group B ===
Pos	Team	Pld	W	D	L	GF	GA	GD	Pts	Qualification
1	Norway	3	2	1	0	4	1	+3	7	Knockout stage
2	Sweden	3	2	0	1	4	2	+2	6	Knockout stage
3	Portugal	3	1	1	1	4	1	+3	4	
4	Slovenia	3	0	0	3	0	8	−8	0	

Source: UEFA
Rules for classification: Group stage tiebreakers
4 May 2018
13:00

Portugal	0–0	Norway
	Report

Bescot Stadium, Walsall
Attendance: 463
Referee: Dennis Higler (Netherlands)
4 May 2018
19:00

Slovenia	0–2	Sweden
	Report	Hammar 7'; Nygren 23'

St George's Park, Burton
Attendance: 338
Referee: Robert Harvey (Republic of Ireland)

7 May 2018
12:30

Norway	2–1	Sweden
Rekdal 39', 69'	Report	Hammar 4'

Pirelli Stadium, Burton
Attendance: 454
Referee: Horatiu Fesnic (Romania)
7 May 2018
15:00

Slovenia	0–4	Portugal
	Report	Correia 17'; Silva 35'; Ribeiro 62'; Ramos 79'

Proact Stadium, Chesterfield
Attendance: 553
Referee: Tihomir Pejin (Croatia)

10 May 2018
13:00

Norway	2–0	Slovenia
Cornic 32'; Aga 38'	Report

Loughborough University Stadium, Loughborough
Attendance: 912
Referee: Robert Harvey (Republic of Ireland)
10 May 2018
13:00

Sweden	1–0	Portugal
Wikström 16'	Report

Pirelli Stadium, Burton
Attendance: 953
Referee: Juri Frischer (Estonia)

=== Group C ===
Pos	Team	Pld	W	D	L	GF	GA	GD	Pts	Qualification
1	Belgium	3	3	0	0	7	0	+7	9	Knockout stage
2	Republic of Ireland	3	2	0	1	3	2	+1	6	Knockout stage
3	Bosnia and Herzegovina	3	1	0	2	3	8	−5	3	
4	Denmark	3	0	0	3	2	5	−3	0	

Source: UEFA
Rules for classification: Group stage tiebreakers
5 May 2018
12:30

Denmark	2–3	Bosnia and Herzegovina
Dyhr 7'; Kirkeby 71' (pen.)	Report	Memišević 47', 72'; Nikolić 76'

Loughborough University Stadium, Loughborough
Attendance: 658
Referee: Juri Frischer (Estonia)
5 May 2018
17:45

Republic of Ireland	0–2	Belgium
	Report	Sidibe 34'; Vertessen 68'

Loughborough University Stadium, Loughborough
Attendance: 824
Referee: Vilhjalmur Thorarinsson (Iceland)

8 May 2018
13:00

Republic of Ireland	1–0	Denmark
Parrott 5'	Report

St George's Park, Burton
Attendance: 481
Referee: Zbynek Proske (Czech Republic)
8 May 2018
19:00

Bosnia and Herzegovina	0–4	Belgium
	Report	Vertessen 17'; Mpie 29'; Rankić 63' (o.g.); Lemoine 79'

New York Stadium, Rotherham
Attendance: 456
Referee: Dennis Higler (Netherlands)

11 May 2018
13:00

Bosnia and Herzegovina	0–2	Republic of Ireland
	Report	Parrott 69'; Idah 80+4'

St George's Park, Burton
Attendance: 406
Referee: Halil Umut Meler (Turkey)
11 May 2018
13:00

Belgium	1–0	Denmark
Doku 30'	Report

Proact Stadium, Chesterfield
Attendance: 1,842
Referee: Zbyněk Proske (Czech Republic)

=== Group D ===
Pos	Team	Pld	W	D	L	GF	GA	GD	Pts	Qualification
1	Netherlands	3	3	0	0	7	0	+7	9	Knockout stage
2	Spain	3	2	0	1	6	3	+3	6	Knockout stage
3	Germany	3	1	0	2	4	8	−4	3	
4	Serbia	3	0	0	3	0	6	−6	0	

Source: UEFA
Rules for classification: Group stage tiebreakers
5 May 2018
15:00

Germany	0–3	Netherlands
	Report	Redan 18' (pen.), 39'; Summerville 41'

Bescot Stadium, Walsall
Attendance: 508
Referee: Tihomir Pejin (Croatia)
5 May 2018
17:45

Serbia	0–1	Spain
	Report	García 68'

Pirelli Stadium, Burton
Attendance: 823
Referee: Horatiu Fesnic (Romania)

8 May 2018
13:00

Serbia	0–3	Germany
	Report	Bozdogan 18'; Dajaku 24', 37'

Loughborough University Stadium, Loughborough
Attendance: 1,038
Referee: Robert Harvey (Republic of Ireland)
8 May 2018
19:00

Netherlands	2–0	Spain
Redan 13'; Tenas 68' (o.g.)	Report

Pirelli Stadium, Burton
Attendance: 1,378
Referee: Halil Umut Meler (Turkey)

11 May 2018
19:00

Netherlands	2–0	Serbia
Brobbey 26', 55'	Report

Loughborough University Stadium, Loughborough
Attendance: 1,186
Referee: Vilhjalmur Thorarinsson (Iceland)
11 May 2018
19:00

Spain	5–1	Germany
García 2'; Mortimer 15'; Baena 46'; Touaizi 65'; Gutiérrez 79'	Report	García 68' (o.g.)

Bescot Stadium, Walsall
Attendance: 1,067
Referee: Dennis Higler (Netherlands)

== Knockout stage ==
In the knockout stage, penalty shoot-out is used to decide the winner if necessary (no extra time is played).

=== Bracket ===
Quarter-finals
13 May – Rotherham
Italy	1
Sweden	0
14 May – Walsall
Belgium	2
Spain	1
13 May – Burton
Norway	0
England	2
14 May – Chesterfield
Netherlands (p)	1 (5)
Republic of Ireland	1 (4)

Semi-finals
17 May – Rotherham
Italy	2
Belgium	1
17 May – Chesterfield
England	0 (5)
Netherlands (p)	0 (6)

Final
20 May – Rotherham
Italy	2 (1)
Netherlands (p)	2 (4)

=== Quarter-finals ===
13 May 2018
14:00

Italy	1–0	Sweden
Vergani 4'	Report

New York Stadium, Rotherham
Attendance: 1,061
Referee: Dennis Higler (Netherlands)

13 May 2018
18:00

Norway	0–2	England
	Report	Duncan 14'; Amaechi 49'

Pirelli Stadium, Burton
Attendance: 5,102
Referee: Juri Frischer (Estonia)

14 May 2018
13:00

Belgium	2–1	Spain
Vertessen 41'; Mpie 49'	Report	Baena 8'

Bescot Stadium, Walsall
Attendance: 891
Referee: Robert Harvey (Republic of Ireland)

14 May 2018
19:00

Netherlands	1–1	Republic of Ireland
Van Gelderen 62'	Report	Parrott 64'
Penalties
Burger (penalty scored); Ihattaren (penalty scored); Brobbey (penalty scored); J. Timber (penalty scored); Redan (penalty scored)	5–4	(penalty missed) Idah; (penalty scored) Parrott; (penalty scored) Murphy; (penalty scored) Knight; (penalty scored) Thompson

Proact Stadium, Chesterfield
Attendance: 673
Referee: Zbynek Proske (Czech Republic)

=== Semi-finals ===
17 May 2018
13:00

Italy	2–1	Belgium
Gyabuaa 31'; Vergani 71'	Report	Vertessen 57'

New York Stadium, Rotherham
Attendance: 2,429
Referee: Vilhjalmur Thorarinsson (Iceland)

17 May 2018
19:00

England	0–0	Netherlands
	Report
Penalties
John-Jules (penalty scored); Daly (penalty scored); Saka (penalty scored); Ashby-Hammond (penalty scored); Appiah (penalty scored); Balogun (penalty missed)	5–6	(penalty scored) Burger; (penalty scored) Ihattaren; (penalty scored) Hendriks; (penalty scored) Tavsan; (penalty scored) J. Timber; (penalty scored) Q. Timber

Proact Stadium, Chesterfield
Attendance: 7,952
Referee: Horatiu Fesnic (Romania)

=== Final ===
20 May 2018
18:15

Italy	2–2	Netherlands
Ricci 61'; Riccardi 63'	Report	J. Timber 46'; Brobbey 74'
Penalties
Armini (penalty missed); Vergani (penalty missed); Greco (penalty scored)	1–4	(penalty scored) Burger; (penalty scored) Ihattaren; (penalty scored) J. Timber; (penalty scored) Hendriks

New York Stadium, Rotherham
Attendance: 4,612
Referee: Halil Umut Meler (Turkey)

== Goalscorers ==
4 goals

- (Belgium) Yorbe Vertessen
- (Italy) Edoardo Vergani

3 goals

- (Netherlands) Brian Brobbey
- (Netherlands) Daishawn Redan
- (Republic of Ireland) Troy Parrott
- (Switzerland) Felix Mambimbi

2 goals

- (Belgium) Jamie Yayi Mpie
- (Bosnia and Herzegovina) Malik Memišević
- (England) Tommy Doyle
- (Germany) Leon Dajaku
- (Italy) Manu Emmanuel Gyabuaa
- (Italy) Alessio Riccardi
- (Norway) Thomas Rekdal
- (Spain) Álex Baena
- (Spain) Eric García
- (Sweden) Fredrik Hammar

1 goal

- (Belgium) Jérémy Doku
- (Belgium) Gabriel Lemoine
- (Belgium) Sekou Sidibe
- (Bosnia and Herzegovina) Nemanja Nikolić
- (Denmark) Nikolas Dyhr
- (Denmark) Andreas Kirkeby
- (England) Xavier Amaechi
- (England) Arvin Appiah
- (England) Matty Daly
- (England) Bobby Duncan
- (Germany) Can Bozdogan
- (Israel) Dan Lugassy
- (Italy) Jean Freddi Greco
- (Italy) Samuele Ricci
- (Netherlands) Crysencio Summerville
- (Netherlands) Jurriën Timber
- (Netherlands) Liam van Gelderen
- (Norway) Oscar Aga
- (Norway) Leo Cornic
- (Portugal) Félix Correia
- (Portugal) Gonçalo Ramos
- (Portugal) Eduardo Ribeiro
- (Portugal) Bernardo Silva
- (Republic of Ireland) Adam Idah
- (Spain) Miguel Gutiérrez
- (Spain) Nils Mortimer
- (Spain) Nabil Touaizi
- (Sweden) Benjamin Nygren
- (Sweden) Rasmus Wikström
- (Switzerland) Tician Tushi

1 own goal

- (Bosnia and Herzegovina) Stefan Rankić (playing against Belgium)
- (Spain) Eric García (playing against Germany)
- (Spain) Arnau Tenas (playing against Netherlands)

Source: UEFA.com

== Team of the tournament ==
The UEFA technical observers selected the following 11 players for the team of the tournament (previously a squad of 18 players were selected):

Goalkeeper

- (England) Luca Ashby-Hammond

Defenders

- (Italy) Nicolò Armini
- (Spain) Ismael Armenteros
- (Norway) Harald Martin Hauso
- (Netherlands) Liam van Gelderen

Defensive midfielders

- (Netherlands) Wouter Burger
- (Spain) Iván Morante

Attacking midfielders

- (England) Xavier Amaechi
- (Belgium) Yorbe Vertessen
- (Netherlands) Mohammed Ihattaren

Forward

- (Italy) Alessio Riccardi
