= Bernardo Silva (disambiguation) =

Bernardo Silva (born 1994) is a Portuguese professional football attacking midfielder for Manchester City and the Portugal national team.

Bernardo Silva may also refer to:

- Bernardo Silva (sailor) (1935–1997), Portuguese sailor
- Bernardo Silva Francisco (born 1995), Portuguese football goalkeeper
- Bernardo Silva (footballer, born 2001), Portuguese football midfielder for 1º Dezembro
- Bernardo Silva (footballer, born 2003), better known as Berna, Portuguese football midfielder for Boavista
