= Nikola Marjanović =

Nikola Marjanović may refer to:

- Nikola Marjanović (footballer, born 1905) (1985–1983), Serbian football forward and manager
- Nikola Marjanović (footballer, born 1955), Serbian football defender
- Nikola Marjanović (footballer, born 2001), Serbian football defender
- Nikola Marjanović (singer) (born 1977), Croatian singer-songwriter and voice actor
