= Gelmi =

Gelmi is an Italian surname. Notable people with the surname include:

- Ludovico Gelmi (born 2001), Italian footballer
- Roy Gelmi (born 1995), Swiss footballer
