= Xavi Sintes =

Spanish footballer (born 2001)

Personal information
- Full name: Xavier Sintes Egea
- Date of birth: 5 August 2001 (age 25)
- Place of birth: Mahón, Spain
- Height: 1.91 m (6 ft 3 in)
- Positions: Centre-back; midfielder

Team information
- Current team: Estoril Praia
- Number: 6

Youth career
- 2005–2013: Sant Lluis
- 2013–2014: Mahón
- 2014–2016: Atlético Villacarlos
- 2016–2017: Mallorca
- 2017–2018: San Francisco
- 2018–2019: Mallorca
- 2019–2020: Real Madrid

Senior career*
Years	Team	Apps	(Gls)
2018–2019	Mallorca B	16	(0)
2020–2021	Real Madrid B	14	(0)
2021–2024	Sevilla B	77	(5)
2024–2026	Córdoba	60	(0)
2026–	Estoril Praia	0	(0)

International career
2018	Spain U17	2	(0)
2018	Spain U18	4	(0)
2019	Spain U19	2	(0)
- * Club domestic league appearances and goals as of 7 September 2026

Xavier "Xavi" Sintes Egea (born 5 August 2001) is a Spanish footballer who plays as either a centre-back or a central midfielder for Primeira Liga club Estoril Praia.

== Club career ==
Sintes was born in Mahón, Menorca, Balearic Islands, and represented CCE Sant Lluis, UD Mahón and Atlético Villacarlos before joining RCD Mallorca's youth sides in August 2016. He made his senior debut with the reserves on 25 August 2018, coming on as a second-half substitute in a 1–0 away win over CF Sant Rafel.

On 31 January 2019, Sintes and Mallorca teammate agreed to a contract with Real Madrid, effective as of 1 July. Initially assigned to the Juvenil squad, he won the UEFA Youth League with the side before being promoted to Real Madrid Castilla in August 2020.

On 12 August 2021, Sintes signed a three-year deal with Sevilla FC, being assigned to the B-team in Primera División RFEF. He suffered a knee injury in January of the following year which kept him sidelined for eight months, and was subsequently converted into a centre-back after returning.

On 3 July 2024, Sintes joined Segunda División side Córdoba CF on a two-year contract. He made his professional debut on 26 August, replacing Cristian Carracedo in a 2–2 home draw against Burgos CF.

On 26 August 2026, Sintes signed with Estoril Praia in the Portuguese Primeira Liga for one season.

== International career ==
Sintes represented Spain at under-17, under-18 and under-19 levels.

== Honours ==
Real Madrid

- UEFA Youth League: 2019–20
