= Alberto Barazzetta =

Italian footballer (born 2001)

Personal information
- Date of birth: 18 February 2001 (age 25)
- Place of birth: Monza, Italy
- Height: 1.81 m (5 ft 11 in)
- Position: Right back

Youth career
- –2020: AC Milan

Senior career*
Years	Team	Apps	(Gls)
2020–2022	Giana Erminio	11	(1)

International career
2016	Italy U-15	9	(0)
2016	Italy U-16	13	(0)
2017–2018	Italy U-17	19	(0)
2018–2019	Italy U-18	2	(0)
- * Club domestic league appearances and goals as of 24 April 2022

Alberto Barazzetta (born 18 February 2001) is an Italian professional footballer who plays as a right back.

== Club career ==
Born in Monza, Barazzetta started his career on AC Milan youth. On 9 September 2020, he signed for Serie C club Giana Erminio until June 2022.

== International career ==
Youth international for Italy since U-15, Barazzetta played on the 2018 UEFA European Under-17 Championship.
