= Bram Franken =

Dutch footballer

Personal information
- Date of birth: 14 February 2001 (age 25)
- Place of birth: Zwanenburg, Netherlands
- Position: Midfielder

Team information
- Current team: Noordwijk
- Number: 21

Youth career
- VV Zwanenburg

Senior career*
Years	Team	Apps	(Gls)
2020–2022	Jong AZ	42	(3)
2022–2024	Quick Boys	55	(3)
2024–	Noordwijk	31	(2)

International career
2017–2018	Netherlands U17	12	(0)
2018	Netherlands U18	6	(0)
Medal record
Representing Netherlands
UEFA European Under-17 Championship
Winner	England 2018	U-17 Team
- * Club domestic league appearances and goals as of 4 August 2025

Bram Franken (born 14 February 2001) is a Dutch footballer who plays as a midfielder for Noordwijk.

== Club career ==
Franken made his professional debut with Jong AZ in a 3–0 Eerste Divisie loss to FC Den Bosch on 31 January 2020. On 24 April 2020, he signed a contract keeping him with Jong AZ until 2022.

== International career ==
Franken played 6 games for the Netherlands national under-18 football team.

== Honours ==
Netherlands U17

- UEFA European Under-17 Championship: 2018
