= Brian Brobbey =

Dutch footballer (born 2002)

- Brobbey playing for Sunderland in 2026

Personal information
- Full name: Brian Ebenezer Adjei Brobbey
- Date of birth: 1 February 2002 (age 24)
- Place of birth: Amsterdam, Netherlands
- Height: 1.81 m (5 ft 11 in)
- Position: Striker

Team information
- Current team: Sunderland
- Number: 9

Youth career
- –2010: AFC
- 2010–2018: Ajax

Senior career*
Years	Team	Apps	(Gls)
2018–2021	Jong Ajax	32	(16)
2020–2021	Ajax	12	(3)
2021–2022	RB Leipzig	9	(0)
2022	→ Ajax (loan)	11	(7)
2022–2025	Ajax	92	(35)
2025–	Sunderland	39	(10)

International career^{‡}
2017	Netherlands U15	6	(4)
2017	Netherlands U16	5	(5)
2017–2019	Netherlands U17	24	(16)
2019	Netherlands U19	2	(1)
2021–2023	Netherlands U21	17	(9)
2023–	Netherlands	17	(4)
Medal record
Men's football
Representing Netherlands
UEFA European Championship
Bronze medal – third place	2024 Germany	Team
UEFA European Under-17 Championship
Winner	2018 England	Team
Winner	2019 Ireland	Team
- * Club domestic league appearances and goals as of 20:45, 9 November 2026 (UTC) ‡ National team caps and goals as of 26 September 2026

Brian Ebenezer Adjei Brobbey (born 1 February 2002) is a Dutch professional footballer who plays as a striker for Premier League club Sunderland and the Netherlands national team.

== Club career ==
=== Early career ===
Brobbey began his youth career with AFC before joining the Ajax academy in 2010.

=== Ajax ===
Brobbey made his Ajax debut in the Eredivisie on 31 October 2020, coming on as a substitute and scoring in a 5–2 victory over Fortuna Sittard. He made his European debut in the group stage of the UEFA Champions League against Atalanta on 9 December 2020 and his performance was praised by coach Erik ten Hag.

On 3 February 2021, Ajax director of football Marc Overmars confirmed that Brobbey would leave the club at the expiry of his contract at the end of the season. Brobbey scored his first goal in a European competition on 18 February, netting Ajax's second goal in their Europa League round of 32 first leg away win over Lille.

=== RB Leipzig ===
On 12 March 2021, RB Leipzig announced the signing of Brobbey. He joined them on 1 July 2021.

==== Return to Ajax on loan ====
On 27 December 2021, it was announced that Brobbey would return to Ajax on a six-month loan spell without an option to buy. He was assigned shirt number 18, previously worn that season by Jurgen Ekkelenkamp.

He made his first appearance on 16 January 2022 in an away match against FC Utrecht as the starting striker, securing two goals before being substituted off in the 70th minute for Davy Klaassen in a 3–0 victory.

=== Return to Ajax ===
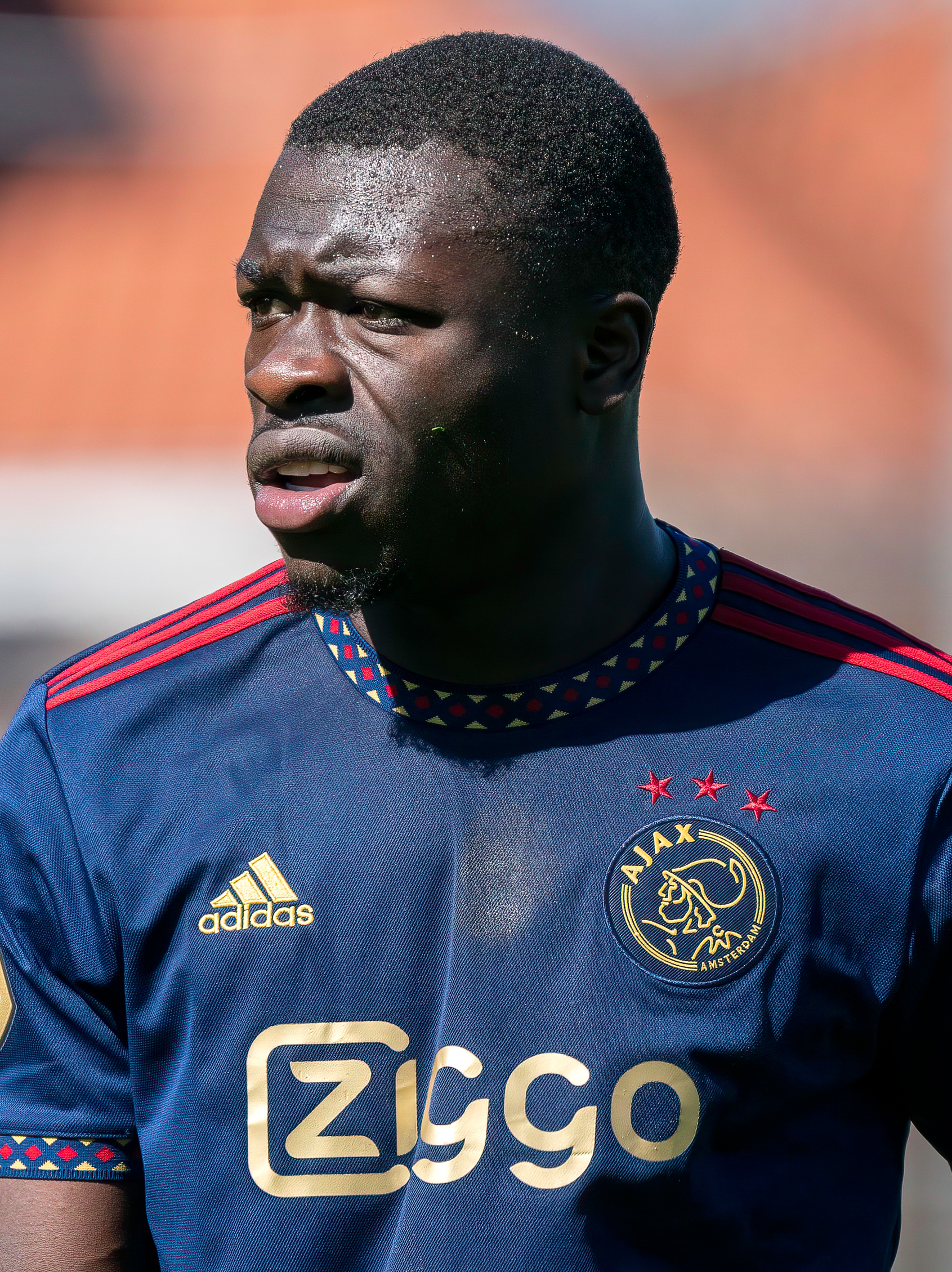
Brobbey with Ajax in 2023

On 22 July 2022, Ajax confirmed the re-signing of Brian Brobbey on a five-year contract for a fee of €16.35 million plus €3 million in potential add ons. He made his competitive return debut on the first matchday of the 2022–23 season, also scoring his first return goal for Ajax in a 3–2 away win over Fortuna Sittard on 6 August.

On 16 and 22 October 2022, Brobbey scored back-to-back braces, leading his team to a 7–1 victory over Excelsior and a 4–1 win over RKC Waalwijk, respectively. Brobbey scored 14 goals in 44 appearances in all competitions during the season, as he was in and out of the starting lineup under first head coach Alfred Schreuder, and since interim coach John Heitinga.

In the following season, Brobbey began as a starter in attack under newly appointed manager Maurice Steijn. Despite Ajax enduring a difficult campaign overall, Brobbey enjoyed a strong individual season, finishing as the club's top scorer with 22 goals in 43 appearances across all competitions.

He earned back-to-back Eredivisie Player of the Month awards for December 2023 and January 2024, and his performances throughout the season led to him being named Ajax Player of the Year. His prolific form reportedly attracted significant interest from clubs abroad, including Arsenal, during the subsequent transfer window.

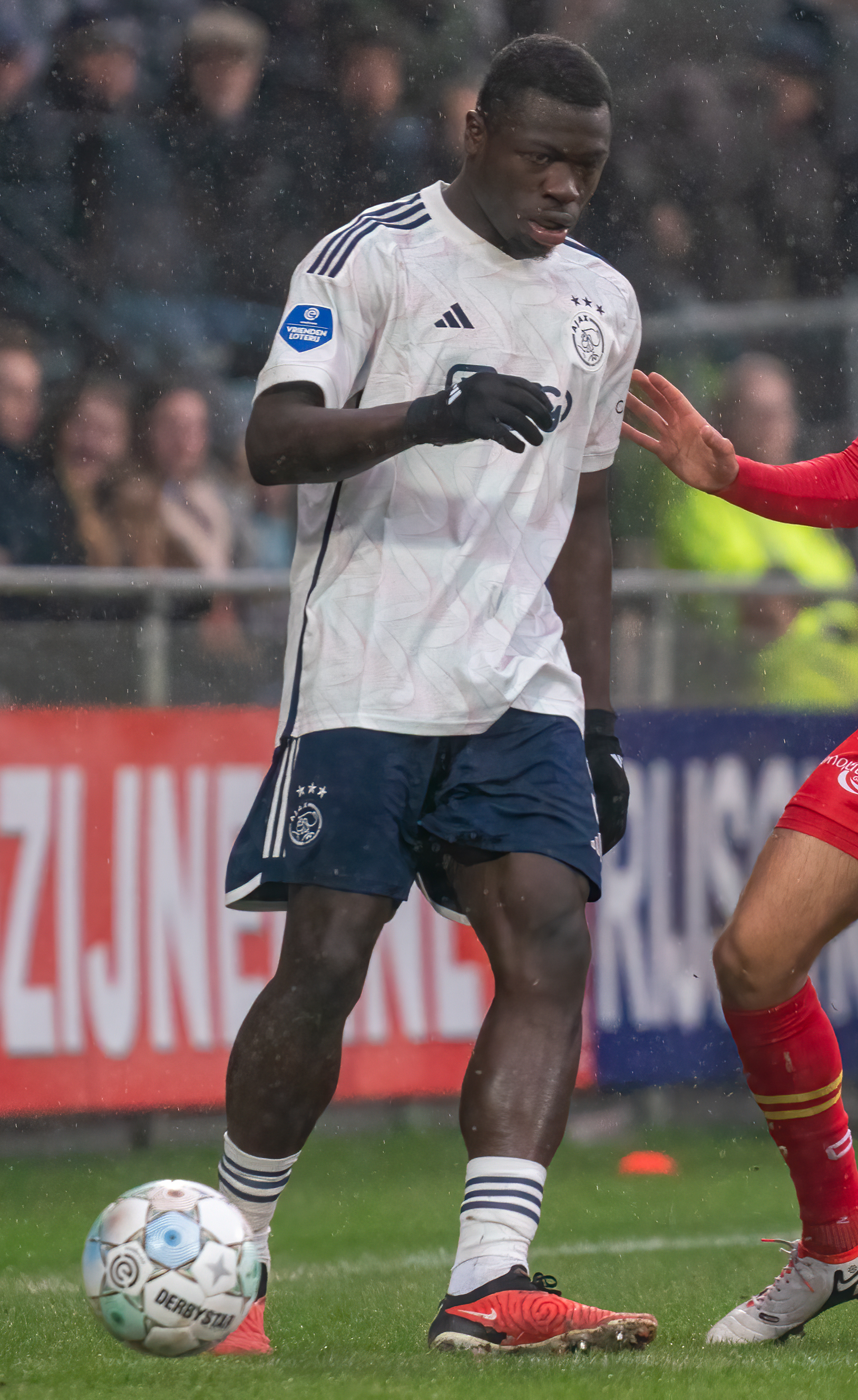
Brobbey with Ajax in 2024

Brobbey remained at Ajax and continued as the main striker for the 2024–25 season under new manager Francesco Farioli. While Farioli noted in March 2025 that Brobbey's league goal tally was initially lower than expected, he praised the striker's progression and importance to the team. Brobbey contributed goals in both the Eredivisie and the UEFA Europa League campaign, and he won the Eredivisie Player of the Month award for a third time in February 2025.

=== Sunderland ===
On 1 September 2025, Brobbey joined Sunderland for a fee of €20m, which could potentially rise to €25m. He scored his first goal for Sunderland on 8 November 2025, netting the injury-time equaliser in a 2–2 draw against Arsenal. He finished the 2025–26 season as Sunderland's top goal scorer, with seven goals.

During the 2026–27 season, Brobbey scored a hat-trick against Manchester City in an eventual 5–3 defeat on 20 September.

== International career ==
=== Youth ===
Brobbey represented the Netherlands across various youth levels, most notably the Netherlands U17 team. Brobbey was a key figure in the squad that won back-to-back UEFA European Under-17 Championship titles in 2018 and 2019. During the 2019 final against Italy, he scored in the 4–2 victory to help secure the trophy.

=== Senior ===
In October 2022, Brobbey was included in the preliminary squad for the 2022 FIFA World Cup by manager Louis van Gaal, but he did not make the final selection. He received his first official call-up to the Netherlands senior national team in October 2023 for the UEFA Euro 2024 qualifying matches against France and Greece. Brobbey made his senior debut on 16 October 2023, coming on as a substitute in the 1–0 away victory against Greece.

On 29 May 2024, Brobbey was named in the Netherlands' squad for UEFA Euro 2024 in Germany. He was part of the squad that reached the semi-finals, although his playing time was limited due to competition from Memphis Depay and Wout Weghorst. Brobbey scored his first senior international goal on 19 November 2024 during the 2024–25 UEFA Nations League A campaign, netting the opening goal in a 1–1 draw against Bosnia and Herzegovina at the Bilino Polje Stadium.

On 27 May 2026, Brobbey was named in the Netherlands' squad for the 2026 FIFA World Cup. In his first World Cup start on 20 June 2026, Brobbey scored a brace in the first 17 minutes of the game to help the Netherlands to a 5–1 win over Sweden. Hence, he became the second Dutch player to score a brace on his first FIFA World Cup start, following Johnny Rep in 1974.

== Personal life ==
Born in the Netherlands, Brobbey is of Ghanaian descent. He is a younger brother of fellow footballers Kevin Brobbey and Samuel Brobbey. Derrick Luckassen is his half-brother.

== Career statistics ==
=== Club ===
As of match played 8 November 2026

Appearances and goals by club, season and competition
Club	Season	League			National cup (Note: Includes DFB-Pokal, KNVB Cup, FA Cup)		League cup		Europe		Other		Total	
Club	Season	Division	Apps	Goals	Apps	Goals	Apps	Goals	Apps	Goals	Apps	Goals	Apps	Goals
Jong Ajax	2018–19	Eerste Divisie	2	0	—		—		—		—		2	0
Jong Ajax	2019–20	Eerste Divisie	13	7	—		—		—		—		13	7
Jong Ajax	2020–21	Eerste Divisie	17	9	—		—		—		—		17	9
Jong Ajax	Total		32	16	—		—		—		—		32	16
Ajax	2020–21	Eredivisie	12	3	0	0	—		7 (Note: One appearance in UEFA Champions League, six appearances and three goals in UEFA Europa League)	3	—		19	6
RB Leipzig	2021–22	Bundesliga	9	0	1	0	—		4 (Note: Appearance(s) in UEFA Champions League)	0	—		14	0
Ajax (loan)	2021–22	Eredivisie	11	7	1	0	—		1	0	—		13	7
Ajax	2022–23	Eredivisie	32	13	4	1	—		7 (Note: Five appearances in UEFA Champions League, two appearances in UEFA Europa League)	0	1 (Note: Appearance in Johan Cruyff Shield)	0	44	14
Ajax	2023–24	Eredivisie	30	18	1	1	—		12 (Note: Eight appearances in UEFA Europa League, four appearances in UEFA Europa Conference League)	3	—		43	22
Ajax	2024–25	Eredivisie	30	4	2	0	—		12 (Note: Appearances in UEFA Europa League)	4	—		44	8
Ajax	Total		103	42	8	2	—		31	7	1	0	144	51
Sunderland	2025–26	Premier League	31	7	1	0	—		—		—		32	7
Sunderland	2026–27	Premier League	8	3	0	0	0	0	2	0	—		10	3
Sunderland	Total		39	10	1	0	0	0	2	0	—		42	10
Career total			195	71	10	2	0	0	45	10	1	0	251	83

=== International ===
As of match played 26 September 2026

Appearances and goals by national team and year
National team	Year	Apps	Goals
Netherlands	2023	1	0
Netherlands	2024	6	1
Netherlands	2025	1	0
Netherlands	2026	9	3
Total		17	4

Netherlands score listed first, score column indicates score after each Brobbey goal.

List of international goals scored by Brian Brobbey
No.	Date	Venue	Cap	Opponent	Score	Result	Competition
1	19 November 2024	Bilino Polje Stadium, Zenica, Bosnia and Herzegovina	7	Bosnia and Herzegovina	1–0	1–1	2024–25 UEFA Nations League A
2	20 June 2026	NRG Stadium, Houston, United States	14	Sweden	1–0	5–1	2026 FIFA World Cup
3	20 June 2026	NRG Stadium, Houston, United States	14	Sweden	2–0	5–1	2026 FIFA World Cup
4	25 June 2026	Arrowhead Stadium, Kansas City, United States	15	Tunisia	2–0	3–1	2026 FIFA World Cup

== Honours ==
Ajax

- Eredivisie: 2020–21, 2021–22
- KNVB Cup: 2020–21

Netherlands U17

- UEFA European Under-17 Championship: 2018, 2019

Individual

- Eredivisie Player of the Month: December 2023, January 2024, February 2025
- Eredivisie Talent of the Month: May 2022, August 2022, October 2022
- Eredivisie Team of the Month: February 2025
- Ajax Player of the Year (Rinus Michels Award): 2023–24
