= Nicolò Armini =

Italian footballer (born 2001)

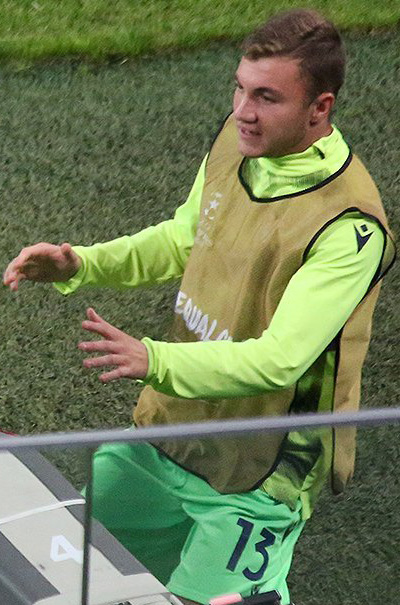
- Armini with Lazio in 2020

Personal information
- Date of birth: 7 March 2001 (age 25)
- Place of birth: Marino, Lazio, Italy
- Height: 1.85 m (6 ft 1 in)
- Position: Centre-back

Team information
- Current team: Crotone
- Number: 13

Youth career
- Santa Maria delle Mole
- 2016-2018: Lazio

Senior career*
Years	Team	Apps	(Gls)
2018–2023	Lazio	3	(0)
2021–2022	→ Piacenza (loan)	18	(0)
2022–2023	→ Potenza (loan)	22	(0)
2023–2024	Potenza	26	(1)
2024–	Crotone	31	(0)
2025–2026	→ Campobasso (loan)	9	(0)

International career
2016	Italy U15	6	(0)
2016–2017	Italy U16	11	(1)
2017–2018	Italy U17	22	(0)
2018–2019	Italy U18	7	(1)
2018–2020	Italy U19	8	(0)
2021	Italy U20	4	(0)
Medal record
Representing Italy
UEFA European Under-17 Championship
Runner-up	England 2018	U-17 Team
- * Club domestic league appearances and goals as of 29 August 2026

Nicolò Armini (born 7 March 2001) is an Italian professional footballer who plays as a centre-back for Serie C Group C club Crotone.

== Club career ==
=== Lazio ===
Armini is a youth product of Lazio, whom he joined from Santa Maria delle Mole. Considered one of the club's most promising prospects, he has been compared to Lazio legend Alessandro Nesta.

On 29 November 2018, Armini made his professional debut in a UEFA Europa League game against Apollon Limassol. He came on as a substitute for Felipe Caicedo as his team lost 2–0. On 20 May 2019, Armini made his first Serie A appearance, coming into play instead of Luiz Felipe, who came off due to an injury, in a match against Bologna which ended in a 3–3 draw.

==== Piacenza (loan) ====
On 10 August 2021 he joined Piacenza on loan. He made his debut for the club on 29 August in a Serie C match against Trento which finished 0–0.

=== Potenza ===
On 27 July 2022, Armini was loaned to Potenza in Serie C.

On 23 August 2023, Armini returned to Potenza on a permanent basis and signed a two-year contract.

=== Crotone ===
On 30 August 2024, Armini joined Serie C club Crotone.

=== Campobasso ===
Upon completion of the 2025 / 26 summer transfer market session, precisely on 1 September 2025, Armini's loan move to Serie C club Campobasso has been made official.

== International career ==
With the Italy U17 team, Armini participated in the 2018 UEFA European Under-17 Championship in England. A starter in central defense throughout the tournament, he took part in all of his team's six games. He even appeared as team captain in the semi-final, which was won over Belgium. Italy eventually lost to the Netherlands in the final after a penalty-shootout. Armini was subsequently included in the UEFA team of the tournament.

With the under-18 team, Armini appeared as captain five times, and scored a goal against Slovenia in August 2018.

With the under-19 team, he participated in the 2019 UEFA European Under-19 Championship in Armenia. He only took part in one match during this competition, against the hosts Armenia, where the Italians won by a large margin of 4–0.

== Career statistics ==
As of match played 3 February 2024

Appearances and goals by club, season and competition
Club	Season	League			Cup		Europe		Other		Total	
Club	Season	Division	Apps	Goals	Apps	Goals	Apps	Goals	Apps	Goals	Apps	Goals
Lazio	2018–19	Serie A	1	0	0	0	1 (Note: Appearance in UEFA Europa League)	0	—		2	0
Lazio	2019–20	Serie A	1	0	0	0	0	0	—		1	0
Lazio	2020–21	Serie A	1	0	0	0	0	0	0	0	1	0
Lazio	Total		3	0	0	0	1	0	0	0	4	0
Piacenza (loan)	2021–22	Serie C	18	0	2 (Note: Appearances in Coppa Italia Serie C)	0	—		0	0	20	0
Potenza (loan)	2022–23	Serie C	22	0	2	0	—		1 (Note: Appearance(s) in Serie C promotion play-offs)	0	25	0
Potenza	2023–24	Serie C	16	0	1	0	—		—		17	0
Potenza	Total		38	0	3	0	—		1	0	42	0
Career total			59	0	5	0	1	0	1	0	66	0

== Honours ==
Lazio

- Coppa Italia: 2018–19
- Supercoppa Italiana: 2017, 2019

Italy U17

- UEFA European Under-17 Championship runner-up: 2018

Individual

- UEFA European Under-17 Championship Team of the Tournament: 2018
