= Bernardo Francisco =

Portuguese footballer (born 1995)

Personal information
- Full name: Bernardo Silva Francisco
- Date of birth: 28 August 1995 (age 31)
- Place of birth: Sintra, Portugal
- Height: 1.83 m (6 ft 0 in)
- Position: Goalkeeper

Youth career
- 2008–2009: CAC
- 2009–2011: Estrela da Amadora
- 2011–2012: Real
- 2012–2014: Atlético CP

Senior career*
Years	Team	Apps	(Gls)
2014–2017	Atlético CP	29	(0)
2017–2019	Louletano	2	(0)
2019–2020	Olímpico Montijo	7	(0)
2020	Fátima	0	(0)
2021	Pero Pinheiro	0	(0)
2022	Alta de Lisboa	3	(0)
2023	Estrela da Amadora C	13	(0)
- * Club domestic league appearances and goals as of 22:51, 2 March 2020 (UTC)

Bernardo Silva Francisco (born 28 August 1995) is a Portuguese professional footballer who plays as a goalkeeper.

== Career ==
On 20 August 2014, Francisco made his professional debut with Atlético CP in a 2014–15 Taça da Liga match against Beira-Mar.
