= Lenny Borges =

German footballer (born 2001)

Personal information
- Full name: Lenny Alexander Borges
- Date of birth: 30 April 2001 (age 25)
- Place of birth: Salzwedel, Germany
- Height: 1.83 m (6 ft 0 in)
- Position: Right-back

Team information
- Current team: Holstein Kiel
- Number: 43

Youth career
- –2011: Lüneburger SK Hansa
- 2011–2019: Hamburger SV
- 2019–2022: AC Milan

Senior career*
Years	Team	Apps	(Gls)
2020–2022	AC Milan	0	(0)
2020–2021	→ Bayern Munich II (loan)	4	(0)
2023–2024	Holstein Kiel II	6	(1)
2024–	Holstein Kiel II	18	(2)
2026–	Holstein Kiel	0	(0)

International career^{‡}
2017–2018	Germany U17	13	(0)
2018	Germany U18	2	(0)
- * Club domestic league appearances and goals as of 18 May 2026 ‡ National team caps and goals as of 2 October 2020

Lenny Alexander Borges (born 30 April 2001) is a German professional footballer who plays as a right-back for 2. Bundesliga club Holstein Kiel. He is a former German youth international.

== Club career ==
Born in Salzwedel, Germany, Borges is a youth product of Lüneburger SK Hansa and Hamburger SV.

He moved to Italy and signed with the youth academy of Serie A club AC Milan for an undisclosed fee in September 2019.

Borges joined Bayern Munich II on a season-long loan in September 2020.

== International career ==
Borges represented Germany at the under-17 and under-18 levels.
