= Giorgio Brogni =

Italian footballer (born 2001)

Personal information
- Date of birth: 28 January 2001 (age 25)
- Place of birth: Calcinate, Italy
- Height: 1.80 m (5 ft 11 in)
- Position: Defender

Team information
- Current team: Real Calepina
- Number: 3

Youth career
- Atalanta

Senior career*
Years	Team	Apps	(Gls)
2020–2024	Atalanta	0	(0)
2020–2022	→ Feralpisalò (loan)	43	(0)
2022	→ Paganese (loan)	16	(0)
2022–2023	→ Ancona (loan)	15	(0)
2023–2024	→ Gubbio (loan)	1	(0)
2024	→ Fiorenzuola (loan)	11	(0)
2024–2025	Magenta	21	(1)
2025–	Real Calepina	21	(0)

International career^{‡}
2017–2018	Italy U17	13	(0)
2018–2019	Italy U18	7	(0)
2018–2019	Italy U19	4	(0)
2021	Italy U20	1	(0)
- * Club domestic league appearances and goals as of 2 August 2026 ‡ National team caps and goals as of 6 September 2021

Giorgio Brogni (born 28 January 2001) is an Italian professional footballer who plays as a defender for Serie D club Real Calepina.

== Club career ==
On 16 July 2021, his loan to Feralpisalò was extended for the 2021–22 season. However, he lost his position in the first half of the 2021–22 season to newcomer Niccolò Corrado.

On 12 January 2022, he moved on a new loan to Paganese. On 9 July 2022, Brogni was loaned to Ancona.

On 12 January 2024, Brogni joined Fiorenzuola on loan.

== International career ==
Brogni was a youth international player for Italy between 2017 and 2019.
