= Edoardo Vergani =

Italian footballer (born 2001)

Personal information
- Date of birth: 6 February 2001 (age 25)
- Place of birth: Segrate, Italy
- Height: 1.86 m (6 ft 1 in)
- Position: Forward

Youth career
- Carugate
- –2014: Monza
- 2014–2021: Inter Milan
- 2020–2021: → Bologna (loan)

Senior career*
Years	Team	Apps	(Gls)
2019–2021	Inter Milan	0	(0)
2020–2021	→ Bologna (loan)	1	(0)
2021–2022	Salernitana	6	(0)
2022–2025	Pescara	60	(8)
2025	Südtirol	1	(0)
2025–2026	Frosinone	15	(1)

International career^{‡}
2016	Italy U15	8	(13)
2016–2017	Italy U16	14	(5)
2017–2018	Italy U17	22	(8)
2018–2019	Italy U18	4	(0)
2018–2020	Italy U19	4	(2)
2021–2022	Italy U20	3	(5)
Medal record
Representing Italy
UEFA European Under-17 Championship
Runner-up	England 2018	U-17 Team
- * Club domestic league appearances and goals as of 12 May 2026 ‡ National team caps and goals as of 28 March 2022

Edoardo Vergani (born 6 February 2001) is an Italian professional footballer who plays as a forward.

== Club career ==
=== Inter Milan ===
Vergani joined the youth teams of Inter Milan at the age of 13 and represented the club in the 2018–19 and 2019–20 editions of the UEFA Youth League. He made his debut for Inter's senior squad in July 2019, in a friendly. He was first called up to Inter's senior squad for a competitive game in November 2019 for a game against Verona, but remained on the bench.

==== Loan to Bologna ====
On 17 September 2020, he was loaned to Bologna for a season, with an option to purchase.

He made his Serie A debut for Bologna on 5 December 2020 in a game against the club holding his rights, Inter. He substituted Rodrigo Palacio in the 79th minute as Bologna lost 3–1 away.

=== Salernitana ===
On 31 August 2021, Vergani signed a two-year contract with Salernitana.

=== Pescara ===
On 1 September 2022, Vergani signed with Pescara.

=== Südtirol ===
On 3 February 2025, Vergani joined Südtirol in Serie B until 30 June 2025.

=== Frosinone ===
On 27 August 2025, Vergani moved to Frosinone, also in Serie B.

== International career ==
Vergani was first called up to represent Italy for the Under-15 squad in 2016.

At the 2018 UEFA European Under-17 Championship, he scored four goals, including winning goals in the quarter-final and semi-final, as Italy finished as runners-up to Netherlands.
