= Atlético Villacarlos =

Spanish football club

Atletico Villacarlos
- Full name: Atletico Villacarlos
- Nickname: Amarillas (Yellows)
- Founded: 1965
- Ground: Cami de Sa Escola; Es Castell
- Capacity: 1,800
- Chairman: Manuel Delicado
- League: División de Honor – Menorca
- 2025–26: División de Honor – Menorca, 7th of 11
Home colours

Atlético Villacarlos are a Spanish football club based in Es Castell, the most easterly town in Spain. Founded in 1965, they play in the División de Honor – Menorca.

== Season to season ==
Season	Tier	Division	Place	Copa del Rey
1967–68	4	1ª Reg.		
1968–69	4	1ª Reg.	7th	
1969–70	4	1ª Reg.		
1970–71	4	1ª Reg.	7th	
1971–72	4	1ª Reg.	4th	
1972–73	4	Reg. Pref.		
1973–74	4	Reg. Pref.		
1974–75	4	Reg. Pref.	3rd	
1975–76	4	Reg. Pref.	3rd	
1976–77	4	Reg. Pref.	5th	
1977–78	5	Reg. Pref.		
1978–79	5	Reg. Pref.		
1979–80	5	Reg. Pref.		
1980–81	5	Reg. Pref.		
1981–82	5	Reg. Pref.		
1982–83	5	Reg. Pref.		
1983–84	5	Reg. Pref.	2nd	
1984–85	5	Reg. Pref.		
1985–86	5	Reg. Pref.		
1986–87	5	Reg. Pref.		

Season	Tier	Division	Place	Copa del Rey
1987–88	5	Reg. Pref.		
1988–89	5	Reg. Pref.		
1989–90	5	Reg. Pref.		
1990–91	5	Reg. Pref.		
1991–92	5	Reg. Pref.		
1992–93	5	Reg. Pref.		
1993–94	5	Reg. Pref.		
1994–95	5	Reg. Pref.		
1995–96	5	Reg. Pref.		
1996–97	5	Reg. Pref.		
1997–98	5	Reg. Pref.		
1998–99	5	Reg. Pref.		
1999–2000	5	Reg. Pref.		
2000–01	5	Reg. Pref.	7th	
2001–02	5	Reg. Pref.	10th	
2002–03	5	Reg. Pref.	9th	
2003–04	5	Reg. Pref.	2nd	
2004–05	5	Reg. Pref.	2nd	
2005–06	5	Reg. Pref.	1st	
2006–07	5	Reg. Pref.	1st	

Season	Tier	Division	Place	Copa del Rey
2007–08	4	3ª	20th	
2008–09	5	Reg. Pref.	6th	
2009–10	5	Reg. Pref.	4th	
2010–11	5	Reg. Pref.	1st	
2011–12	5	Reg. Pref.	3rd	
2012–13	5	Reg. Pref.	8th	
2013–2020	DNP			
2020–21	5	Reg. Pref.	11th	
2021–22	6	Reg. Pref.	10th	
2022–23	6	Reg. Pref.	4th	
2023–24	6	Reg. Pref.	6th	
2024–25	6	Div. Hon.	7th	
2025–26	6	Div. Hon.		

- 1 season in Tercera División
