= Emmanuel Gyabuaa =

Italian footballer (born 2001)

Personal information
- Full name: Manu Emmanuel Gyabuaa
- Date of birth: 21 September 2001 (age 25)
- Place of birth: Parma, Italy
- Height: 1.75 m (5 ft 9 in)
- Position: Midfielder

Team information
- Current team: Salernitana

Youth career
- Parma
- 2015–2020: Atalanta

Senior career*
Years	Team	Apps	(Gls)
2020–2026	Atalanta	1	(0)
2021–2022	→ Perugia (loan)	6	(0)
2022–2023	→ Pescara (loan)	28	(1)
2023–2025	Atalanta U23	74	(1)
2025–2026	→ Avellino (loan)	5	(0)
2026	→ Salernitana (loan)	15	(0)
2026–	Salernitana	0	(0)

International career
2016	Italy U15	5	(0)
2016–2017	Italy U16	15	(1)
2017–2018	Italy U17	22	(4)
2018–2019	Italy U18	9	(0)
2019–2020	Italy U19	10	(0)
Medal record
Representing Italy
UEFA European Under-17 Championship
Runner-up	England 2018	U-17 Team
- * Club domestic league appearances and goals as of 20 July 2026

Manu Emmanuel Gyabuaa (born 21 September 2001) is an Italian professional footballer who plays as a midfielder for Serie C Group C club Salernitana.

== Club career ==
A youth product of Parma, the club declared bankruptcy in 2015 and Gyabuaa joined the youth academy of Atalanta. He made his professional debut with Atalanta as a substitute a 3–0 Serie A win over Fiorentina on 13 December 2020. In July 2021, Gyabuaa joined Serie B club Perugia on a one-year dry loan.

In July 2022, Gyabuaa joined Serie C club Pescara on a one-year loan.

On 13 July 2025, he was loaned by Avellino in Serie B, with an option to buy.

== International career ==
Born in Italy, Gyabuaa is of Ghanaian descent. He is a youth international for Italy.
