= Gonçalo Tabuaço =

Portuguese footballer (born 2001)

Personal information
- Full name: José Gonçalo Macedo Tabuaço
- Date of birth: 11 March 2001 (age 25)
- Place of birth: Porto, Portugal
- Height: 1.88 m (6 ft 2 in)
- Position: Goalkeeper

Team information
- Current team: Marítimo
- Number: 1

Youth career
- 2020: Beira-Mar
- 2020: Portimonense
- 2020–2021: Leixões

Senior career*
Years	Team	Apps	(Gls)
2021–2022	Estrela da Amadora	21	(0)
2022–2023	B-SAD	32	(0)
2023–2024	Lugo	15	(0)
2024–	Marítimo	33	(0)
2026	→ Leixões (loan)	5	(0)

International career^{‡}
2017	Portugal U17	3	(0)
2018	Portugal U18	1	(0)
2022	Portugal U21	1	(0)
- * Club domestic league appearances and goals as of 19 June 2026 ‡ National team caps and goals as of 17 June 2023

José Gonçalo Macedo Tabuaço (born 11 March 2001) is a Portuguese professional footballer who plays as a goalkeeper for Primeira Liga club Marítimo.

== Club career ==
=== Estrela da Amadora ===
Tabuaço began his career with Estrela, and was given his Liga Portugal 2 debut by head coach Ricardo Chéu on 2 October 2021, in a 1–0 victory with Leixões S.C. at the Estádio José Gomes.

=== B-SAD ===
On 9 August 2022, Tabuaço joined B-SAD of the Liga Portugal 2 on a two-year deal.

=== Lugo ===
On 1 July 2023, Tabuaço moved abroad and signed a contract with CD Lugo of the Spanish Primera Federación.

=== Marítimo ===
On 5 July 2024, Tabuaço returned to Portugal to play for Liga Portugal 2 club Marítimo.

=== Leixões ===
In January 2026, after struggling for game-time with Marítimo during the first half of the 2025–26 season, Tabuaço joined fellow Liga Portugal 2 side Leixões on loan with an option-to-buy.

== Career statistics ==
As of match played 27 October 2026

Appearances and goals by club, season and competition
Club	Season	League			National cup (Note: Includes Taça de Portugal, Copa del Rey)		League cup (Note: Includes Taça da Liga)		Other		Total	
Club	Season	Division	Apps	Goals	Apps	Goals	Apps	Goals	Apps	Goals	Apps	Goals
Estrela	2021–22	Liga Portugal 2	21	0	1	0	0	0	—		22	0
B-SAD	2022–23	Liga Portugal 2	32	0	2	0	1	0	2 (Note: Appearances in Liga Portugal 2, relegation/promotion, final)	0	37	0
Lugo	2023–24	Primera Federación	15	0	2	0	—		—		16	0
Marítimo	2024–25	Liga Portugal 2	31	0	0	0	—		—		31	0
Marítimo	2025–26	Liga Portugal 2	1	0	1	0	—		—		2	0
Marítimo	2026–27	Primeira Liga	0	0	1	0	1	0	—		2	0
Marítimo	Total		32	0	2	0	1	0	—		35	0
Leixões (loan)	2025–26	Liga Portugal 2	5	0	—		—		—		5	0
Career total			105	0	7	0	2	0	2	0	116	0
