= Gabriel Lemoine =

Belgian footballer (born 2001)

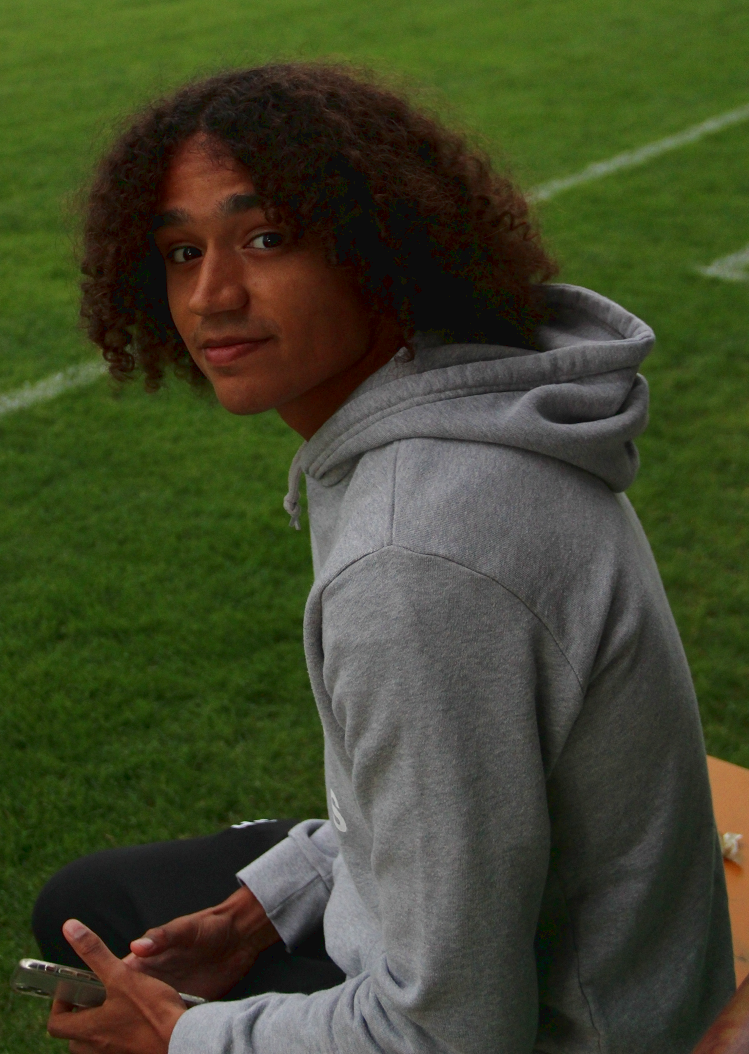
- Lemoine in 2021

Personal information
- Date of birth: 26 March 2001 (age 25)
- Place of birth: La Louvière, Belgium
- Height: 1.88 m (6 ft 2 in)
- Position: Forward

Team information
- Current team: Crossing Schaerbeek
- Number: 29

Youth career
- Club Brugge

Senior career*
Years	Team	Apps	(Gls)
2019–2021	Bordeaux II	7	(0)
2021	→ Lommel (loan)	0	(0)
2021–2022	TSV Hartberg	6	(0)
2022–2023	RAAL La Louvière	8	(0)
2023	→ Royal Knokke (loan)	14	(5)
2023–2024	Cappellen	27	(3)
2024–2025	RUS Binche	19	(2)
2025–2026	Terracina		
2026–	Crossing Schaerbeek	3	(0)

International career
2016	Belgium U15	4	(3)
2016–2017	Belgium U16	10	(0)
2017–2018	Belgium U17	15	(5)
2018	Belgium U18	2	(0)
- * Club domestic league appearances and goals as of 28 June 2026

Gabriel Lemoine (born 26 March 2001) is a Belgian professional footballer who plays as a forward for Crossing Schaerbeek.

== Club career ==
Lemoine is a former youth academy player of Club Brugge. In August 2019, he joined French club Bordeaux on a three-year deal. After failing to break into the club's first team squad, he joined Lommel on a short-term loan deal in February 2021, with option to buy. However, he left the club after loan period without making any appearances.

On 3 August 2021, Austrian club TSV Hartberg announced the signing of Lemoine on a two-year deal. He made his professional debut four days later on 7 August in a 4–3 league defeat against Austria Klagenfurt.

Lemoine returned to his hometown of La Louvière on 5 July 2022, signing with recently promoted Belgian National Division 1 club RAAL La Louvière.

== International career ==
Lemoine is a former Belgian youth international. He was part of Belgian squad which reached semi-finals of 2018 UEFA European Under-17 Championship.

== Personal life ==
Born in Belgium, Lemoine is of Brazilian descent. His brother Laurent Lemoine is also a professional footballer.

== Career statistics ==
=== Club ===
As of 7 August 2021

Appearances and goals by club, season and competition
Club	Season	League			Cup		Continental		Total	
Club	Season	Division	Apps	Goals	Apps	Goals	Apps	Goals	Apps	Goals
Bordeaux II	2019–20	Championnat National 3	7	0	—		—		7	0
Bordeaux II	2020–21	Championnat National 3	0	0	—		—		0	0
Bordeaux II	Total		7	0	0	0	0	0	7	0
Lommel (loan)	2020–21	Belgian First Division B	0	0	0	0	—		0	0
TSV Hartberg	2021–22	Austrian Bundesliga	1	0	0	0	—		1	0
Career total			8	0	0	0	0	0	8	0
