= Nikola Marjanović (footballer, born 2001) =

Serbian football player

Personal information
- Full name: Nikola Marjanović
- Date of birth: 21 May 2001 (age 25)
- Place of birth: Novi Sad, Serbia and Montenegro
- Position: Centre-back

Youth career
- Brodarac

Senior career*
Years	Team	Apps	(Gls)
2019–2020	Brodarac		
2020–2022	Proleter Novi Sad	33	(0)
2020	→ Brodarac (loan)		
2023	Brodarac		
2023-2024	Kabel		

International career^{‡}
2021	Serbia U21	2	(0)
- * Club domestic league appearances and goals as of 1 June 2022 ‡ National team caps and goals as of 8 June 2021

Nikola Marjanović (Serbian Cyrillic: Никола Марјановић; born 21 May 2001) is a Serbian football centre-back.
