= Ludovico Gelmi =

Italian footballer

Personal information
- Date of birth: 2 May 2001 (age 25)
- Place of birth: Alzano Lombardo, Italy
- Height: 1.91 m (6 ft 3 in)
- Position: Goalkeeper

Team information
- Current team: Atalanta

Youth career
- 2011–2021: Atalanta

Senior career*
Years	Team	Apps	(Gls)
2021–	Atalanta	0	(0)
2021–2022	→ Feralpisalò (loan)	13	(0)
2022	→ Pro Vercelli (loan)	0	(0)
2022–2023	→ Olbia (loan)	18	(0)
2023–2024	→ Atalanta U23 (res.)	0	(0)
2024	→ Monopoli (loan)	16	(0)
2024–2025	→ Atalanta U23 (res.)	0	(0)
2025	→ Catanzaro (loan)	0	(0)

International career^{‡}
2016	Italy U15	4	(0)
2017	Italy U16	1	(0)
2017–2018	Italy U17	5	(0)
2018	Italy U18	2	(0)
- * Club domestic league appearances and goals as of 03:30, 26 May 2025 (UTC) ‡ National team caps and goals as of 8 May 2019

Ludovico Gelmi (born 2 May 2001) is an Italian professional footballer who plays as a goalkeeper for Serie A club Atalanta.

== Club career ==
Born in Alzano Lombardo, in 2011 Gelmi joined to Atalanta youth system.

On 7 July 2021, he joined to Serie C club Feralpisalò on loan. Made his debut in Serie C on 28 August against Fiorenzuola.

On 31 January 2022, Gelmi moved on a new loan to Pro Vercelli.

On 14 July 2022, he joined Olbia on loan.

On 11 January 2024, Gelmi was loaned to Monopoli.

On 17 January 2025, he joined Serie B side Catanzaro on loan.

== International career ==
Gelmi is a former youth international for Italy.
