= Jamie Yayi Mpie =

Belgian footballer (born 2001)

Personal information
- Date of birth: 22 May 2001 (age 25)
- Place of birth: Tongeren, Belgium
- Height: 1.86 m (6 ft 1 in)
- Positions: Winger; forward

Team information
- Current team: Bocholt VV

Youth career
- KSK Jecora
- –2014: Tongeren
- 2014–2015: OH Leuven
- 2015–2017: Anderlecht
- 2017–2022: Sampdoria

Senior career*
Years	Team	Apps	(Gls)
2019–2021	Sampdoria	0	(0)
2022–2023	Roda JC	25	(2)
2023	Jong Genk	10	(2)
2023–2024	Orihuela	7	(0)
2024	Spartak Varna	6	(1)
2025	Belisia Bilzen	10	(1)
2026–	Bocholt VV	1	(0)

International career
2016	Belgium U15	1	(0)
2016–2017	Belgium U16	11	(1)
2017–2018	Belgium U17	9	(2)
2018–2019	Belgium U18	6	(1)
- * Club domestic league appearances and goals as of 12:17, 23 January 2026 (UTC)

Jamie Yayi Mpie (born 22 May 2001) is a Belgian professional footballer who plays as a winger or forward for Belgian Division 2 club Bocholt VV.

== Club career ==
Yapi Mpie started his career with Serie A side Sampdoria.

Before the second half of 2021–22, Yapi Mpie signed for Roda JC in the Dutch second tier. On 14 January 2022, he debuted for Roda JC during a 4–0 win over Almere City.

On 31 January 2023, Yayi Mpie signed a year-and-a-half contract with Jong Genk.

On 29 August 2023, Yapi Mpie moved to Orihuela in the Spanish fourth-tier Segunda Federación.

In January 2025, Yapi Mpie returned to Belgium and signed with Belisia Bilzen. In December 2025, it was announced that he would join Bocholt VV from January 2026.

== Personal life ==
Yapi Mpie was born in Belgium to a DR Congolese father and Greek mother.
