= Jean Freddi Greco =

Italian footballer (born 2001)

Personal information
- Date of birth: 12 February 2001 (age 25)
- Place of birth: Antananarivo, Madagascar
- Height: 1.79 m (5 ft 10 in)
- Position: Midfielder

Team information
- Current team: Monopoli
- Number: 15

Youth career
- Totti Soccer School
- –2007: Lodigiani
- 2007–2019: Roma
- 2019–2020: Torino

Senior career*
Years	Team	Apps	(Gls)
2020–2021	Torino	0	(0)
2021–2022	Pordenone	0	(0)
2021–2022	→ Catania (loan)	31	(3)
2022–2025	Vicenza	89	(3)
2025–	Monopoli	44	(0)

International career
2017–2018	Italy U17	22	(1)
2018–2019	Italy U19	20	(0)
2022	Italy U20	2	(0)
- * Club domestic league appearances and goals as of 1 May 2026

Jean Freddi Pascal Greco (born 12 February 2001) is a professional footballer who plays as a midfielder for Serie C Group C club Monopoli. Born in Madagascar, he has represented Italy at youth level.

== Club career ==
=== Early career ===
Greco, grew up in the youth academy of Rome, started his career with Serie A side Torino. He was included in Torino's matchday squads on several occasions, but did not appear on the field.

In 2021, he signed for Pordenone in the Italian second tier. After that, Greco was sent on loan to Italian third-tier club Catania, where he made 18 league appearances and scored 1 goal. On 4 September 2021, he debuted for Catania during a 2–0 win over Fidelis Andria. On 24 October 2021, Greco scored his first goal for Catania during a 4–1 win over Monterosi. Before the second half of the 2021–22 season, he signed for Vicenza in the Italian second tier. After that, Greco was sent on loan to Italian third-tier team Catania once again. Before the season ended, Catania went bankrupt and Greco was allowed to return to Vicenza. He made his Serie B debut for Vicenza on 18 April 2022 against Perugia.

=== International career ===
Greco was born in Madagascar, and adopted by an Italian family at the age of 3. He is a youth international for Italy, having represented the Italy U17s, U19s and U20s.
