= Nils Mortimer =

Spanish footballer (born 2001)

Personal information
- Full name: Nils Mortimer Moreno
- Date of birth: 11 June 2001 (age 25)
- Place of birth: Málaga, Spain
- Height: 1.78 m (5 ft 10 in)
- Position: Winger

Team information
- Current team: Académico Viseu
- Number: 22

Youth career
- 2005–2010: UD La Mosca
- 2010–2011: Sevilla
- 2011–2013: Málaga
- 2013–2019: Barcelona

Senior career*
| Years | Team | Apps | (Gls) |
| 2019–2022 | Barcelona B | 39 | (3) |
| 2022–2023 | Viborg | 22 | (1) |
| 2023–2024 | Granada B | 33 | (1) |
| 2024– | Académico Viseu | 38 | (2) |

International career
| 2018 | Spain U17 | 3 | (0) |
| 2018–2019 | Spain U18 | 6 | (3) |
- * Club domestic league appearances and goals as of 19 June 2026

Nils Mortimer Moreno (born 11 June 2001) is a Spanish professional footballer who plays as a winger for Primeira Liga club Académico de Viseu. He is a former Spanish youth international.

== Career ==
=== Barcelona ===
Born in Málaga, Mortimer began his career at UD La Mosca as a four-year old. Instead of getting picked up by Málaga CF, he was discovered by Sevilla and spent one year making the two-and-a-half-hour trip between the two cities. The distance would prove to be too demanding for the youngster, and he joined Málaga's youth academy. In 2013, he joined the famous Barcelona youth academy where he worked his way through the youth ranks, winning the UEFA Youth League with the Juveniles A in 2018.

Mortimer made his debut for the club's reserve team, Barcelona B, on 24 March 2019 in a 1–0 win at Ebro under head coach García Pimienta, and began receiving regular call-ups for the team during the 2019–20 season. He was officially promoted to the B team in June 2020, signing a three-year contract, with his buyout clause set to €50 million which would rise to €100 million if he were to be promoted to the first team. He made a total of 39 appearances for Barça B, scoring three goals in four seasons as part of the team. He was released from his contract on 7 July 2022, making him a free agent.

=== Viborg ===
On 7 July 2022, the same day as he was released by Barcelona B, Mortimer joined Danish Superliga club Viborg FF on a four-year contract. He made his debut for Viborg on 24 July in a 3–1 away loss to AGF, coming on in the 83rd minute in place of Jay-Roy Grot. His first Viborg goal came on 9 August, opening the score in a 2–1 away win over Faroese club B36 Tórshavn in the UEFA Europa Conference League third qualifying round.

On 10 August 2023, Viborg confirmed the mutual agreement to terminate Mortimer's contract.

=== Granada B ===
On 17 August 2023, Mortimer signed a one-year contract with Granada's B team competing in the third-tier Primera Federación. He made his debut for the club on 27 August, coming on as a substitute in a 2–1 home defeat against Murcia.

=== Académico de Viseu ===
On 30 July 2024, Mortimer signed a one-season contract with Académico de Viseu in Liga Portugal 2, with an option to extend for three more seasons.

== Career statistics ==
=== Club ===
As of match played 2 December 2023

Appearances and goals by club, season and competition
| Club | Season | League | | | Cup | | Europe | | Other | | Total | |
| Club | Season | Division | Apps | Goals | Apps | Goals | Apps | Goals | Apps | Goals | Apps | Goals |
|---|---|---|---|---|---|---|---|---|---|---|---|---|
| Barcelona B | 2018–19 | Segunda División B | 1 | 0 | — | | — | | — | | 1 | 0 |
| Barcelona B | 2019–20 | Segunda División B | 9 | 0 | — | | — | | — | | 9 | 0 |
| Barcelona B | 2020–21 | Segunda División B | 9 | 1 | — | | — | | — | | 9 | 1 |
| Barcelona B | 2021–22 | Primera División RFEF | 19 | 2 | — | | — | | — | | 19 | 2 |
| Barcelona B | Total | | 39 | 3 | — | | — | | — | | 39 | 3 |
| Viborg | 2022–23 | Danish Superliga | 21 | 1 | 5 | 1 | 5 (Note: Appearances in UEFA Europa Conference League) | 1 | — | | 31 | 3 |
| Viborg | 2023–24 | Danish Superliga | 1 | 0 | 0 | 0 | — | | 0 | 0 | 1 | 0 |
| Viborg | Total | | 22 | 1 | 5 | 1 | 5 | 1 | 0 | 0 | 39 | 3 |
| Granada B | 2023–24 | Primera Federación | 14 | 0 | — | | — | | — | | 14 | 0 |
| Career total | | | 75 | 4 | 5 | 1 | 5 | 1 | 0 | 0 | 85 | 6 |
