= Sekou Sidibe =

Belgian footballer

Personal information
- Date of birth: 5 May 2001 (age 25)
- Place of birth: Abobo, Ivory Coast
- Height: 1.72 m (5 ft 8 in)
- Position: Winger

Team information
- Current team: Partizani Tirana
- Number: 51

Youth career
- –2011: Beerschot
- 2011–2020: PSV Eindhoven

Senior career*
Years	Team	Apps	(Gls)
2019–2020	Jong PSV	24	(6)
2020–2021	Emmen	3	(0)
2021–2024	FC U Craiova	95	(12)
2025–2026	RAAL La Louvière	13	(1)
2026–	Partizani Tirana	15	(4)

International career
2015–2016	Belgium U15	6	(2)
2016–2017	Belgium U16	11	(4)
2017–2018	Belgium U17	9	(1)
2018	Belgium U18	1	(0)
- * Club domestic league appearances and goals as of 10 May 2026

Sekou Sidibe (born 5 May 2001) is a professional footballer who plays as a winger for Albanian club Partizani Tirana. Born in the Ivory Coast, Sidibe represented Belgium at youth international level.
