= Bernardo Silva (footballer, born 2001) =

Portuguese footballer

Personal information
- Full name: Bernardo Neves Jesus Gouveia Silva
- Date of birth: 31 May 2001 (age 25)
- Place of birth: Viseu, Portugal
- Height: 1.90 m (6 ft 3 in)
- Positions: Midfielder; centre-back

Team information
- Current team: FA Šiauliai

Youth career
- 2010–2020: Benfica

Senior career*
Years	Team	Apps	(Gls)
2019–2020	Benfica B	0	(0)
2020–2021	Feyenoord	0	(0)
2021	→ Dordrecht (loan)	11	(0)
2021–2023	Famalicão	1	(0)
2022–2023	→ Real SC (loan)	22	(0)
2023–2024	1º Dezembro	6	(0)
2025–	FA Šiauliai	40	(4)

International career^{‡}
2016–2017	Portugal U16	9	(1)
2017–2018	Portugal U17	13	(1)
2018–2019	Portugal U18	7	(0)
2019	Portugal U19	4	(0)
- * Club domestic league appearances and goals as of 7 September 2026 ‡ National team caps and goals as of 15 October 2019

Bernardo Neves Jesus Gouveia Silva (born 31 May 2001), known as Benny Silva or simply Benny, is a Portuguese professional footballer who plays for A Lyga club FA Šiauliai. Mainly a defensive midfielder, he can also play as a central midfielder or centre-back.

== Career ==
Benny made his professional debut for Dordrecht on 27 February 2021 in the Eerste Divisie.

On 16 September 2021, he returned to Portugal and signed with Famalicão.

In September 2022, Famalicão sent Benny on a season-long loan to Liga 3 side Real SC.

In September 2023, after his contract with Famalicão had expired, Benny kept playing in Liga 3, signing a one-year deal with 1º Dezembro.
